= List of Monogatari episodes =

Cover of the Bakemonogatari Blu-ray box set, released in 2011.

The Monogatari Japanese anime series is based on the light novel series written by Nisio Isin and illustrated by Vofan. The anime is directed by several directors and produced by the animation studio Shaft. The series debuted with Bakemonogatari and aired 12 episodes between July 3 and September 25, 2009, on the Tokyo MX television station. Three additional original net animation episodes were distributed on the anime's official website between November 3, 2009, and June 25, 2010. A sequel titled Nisemonogatari aired 11 episodes between January 7 and March 17, 2012. (Note: As Nisemonogatari aired in Tokyo MX's Saturday 24:00 (00:00 JST) time slot, the premiere technically occurred on Sunday, January 8, 2012.)

A prequel to the original series titled Nekomonogatari (Black) aired four episodes back-to-back on December 31, 2012. Six further sequels were later adapted under the common moniker of Monogatari Series Second Season: Nekomonogatari (White), Kabukimonogatari, Otorimonogatari, Onimonogatari, and Koimonogatari aired between July 6 and December 28, 2013, (Note: As Monogatari Series Second Season aired in Tokyo MX's Saturday 24:00 (00:00 JST) time slot, the premiere technically occurred on Sunday, July 7, 2013.) whereas Hanamonogatari, which was originally meant to air with the others in 2013, was postponed and eventually broadcast separately on August 16, 2014. The "final season" of the novels were adapted as Tsukimonogatari, Owarimonogatari, Koyomimonogatari, and Zoku Owarimonogatari which aired from December 31, 2014, through June 22, 2019. An adaptation of the prequel to Bakemonogatari, titled Kizumonogatari, was announced in 2010 but delayed for six years until finally being released as a film trilogy from January 8, 2016, to January 6, 2017. On January 18, 2024, Aniplex and Shaft announced production of anime adaptations of the "Off Season" and "Monster Season" novels.

== Series overview ==
Season	Episodes	Originally aired	
Season	Episodes	First aired	Last aired
Monogatari Series: First Season
Bakemonogatari	15	July 3, 2009	June 25, 2010
Kizumonogatari	3 films	January 8, 2016	January 6, 2017
Nisemonogatari	11	January 7, 2012	March 17, 2012
Nekomonogatari (Black)	4	December 31, 2012	
Monogatari Series: Second Season
Nekomonogatari (White)	5	July 6, 2013	August 3, 2013
Kabukimonogatari	4	August 17, 2013	September 7, 2013
Hanamonogatari	5	August 16, 2014	
Otorimonogatari	4	September 21, 2013	October 12, 2013
Onimonogatari	4	October 26, 2013	November 16, 2013
Koimonogatari	6	November 23, 2013	December 28, 2013
Monogatari Series: Final Season
Tsukimonogatari	4	December 31, 2014	
Koyomimonogatari	12	January 10, 2016	March 27, 2016
Owarimonogatari I	13	October 3, 2015	December 19, 2015
Owarimonogatari II	7	August 12, 2017	August 13, 2017
Zoku Owarimonogatari	6	May 18, 2019	June 22, 2019
Monogatari Series: Off Season (Note: As Monogatari Series: Off & Monster Season aired the arcs out of order and even split individual volumes, this graph displays the first and last episode of each novel without considering the anime's internal sequence. For the internal order, please refer to the corresponding section of this page.)
Orokamonogatari	TBA	July 6, 2024	TBA
Wazamonogatari	TBA	August 17, 2024	TBA
Nademonogatari	5	July 13, 2024	August 10, 2024
Monogatari Series: Monster Season
Shinobumonogatari	6	September 14, 2024	October 19, 2024

== Television series ==
=== Bakemonogatari ===
Bakemonogatari was directed by Akiyuki Shinbo and Tatsuya Oishi at Shaft, has animation character designs and chief animation direction (Note: Credited as Chief Animation Director (総作画監督) in the opening credits.) by Akio Watanabe, and features music composed by Satoru Kōsaki. The season's scripts were written by Yukito Kizawa (Hitagi Crab, Mayoi Mai Mai, Tsubasa Cat) and Muneo Nakamoto (Suruga Monkey, Nadeko Snake) of Seven Days War under the supervision of Shinbo and Shaft. Episodes 4, 6, and 9 were outsourced to other studios by Shaft: episode 4 to Mushi Production, and episodes 6 and 9 to Silver Link.

The season features six pieces of theme music: five opening themes, and one ending theme. "Kimi no Shiranai Monogatari" (君の知らない物語; lit. "The Story You Don't Know"), the ending theme, was produced by Supercell and was sung by Nagi Yanagi. Each of the opening themes was composed by Satoru Kōsaki and written by Meg Rock, featuring vocals from one of the main female characters. The first opening, "staple stable", was sung by Chiwa Saitō (Hitagi Senjougahara); the second opening, "Kaerimichi" (帰り道; lit. "On the Way Home"), was sung by Emiri Katō (Mayoi Hachikuji); the third opening, "Ambivalent World", was sung by Miyuki Sawashiro (Suruga Kanbaru); the fourth opening, "Renai Circulation" (恋愛サーキュレーション, Ren'ai Sākyurēshon; lit. "Love Circulation"), was sung by Kana Hanazawa (Nadeko Sengoku); and the fifth opening, "Sugar Sweet Nightmare", was sung by Yui Horie (Tsubasa Hanekawa).

Type (Note: All credits taken from the opening or ending credits under the Opening (オープニング) or Ending (エンディング) block credits. Directors are credited as either Opening Director (オープニングディレクター), Opening Animation (オープニングアニメーション), Ending Animation (エンディングアニメーション), Director (ディレクター), or Unit Director (演出), depending on the season and opening; storyboard artists are credited as Storyboard Artist (絵コンテ); and animation directors are credited as Animation Director (作画監督).)	Arc	Director	Animation director
Opening	Hitagi Crab	Tatsuya Oishi	Akio Watanabe
Opening	Mayoi Mai Mai	Shin Itagaki	Haruka Tanaka
Opening	Suruga Monkey	Toshimasa Suzuki	Akio Watanabe
Opening	Nadeko Snake	Shin Oonuma	Akio Watanabe
Opening	Tsubasa Cat	Tatsuya Oishi	Akio Watanabe
Ending	All arcs	Hajime Ueda	—N/a

No. overall	No. in season	Title	Directed by (Note: Credits taken from the series' ending credits under the role Episode Director (演出).)	Storyboard artist (Note: Credits taken from the series' ending credits under the role Storyboard Artist (絵コンテ).)	Original release date
1	1	"Hitagi Crab, Part One"; Transliteration: "Hitagi Kurabu Sono Ichi" (Japanese: ひたぎクラブ 其ノ壹)	Tatsuya Oishi; Yukihiro Miyamoto	Nobuyuki Takeuchi	July 3, 2009
Koyomi Araragi catches Hitagi Senjōgahara as she falls down from a great height, and he immediately notices that Hitagi weighs little to nothing; however he does not mention this to her. Later he asks Tsubasa Hanekawa, the class president, about her; he finds that she was sick and contemplates if that is actually the case. As he is leaving, Hitagi confronts him, as she threatens him she explains that a crab took her weight. When he agrees to keep quiet about her secret, she staples the inside of his mouth and proceeds to leave. Koyomi follows her and tells her that he may be able to help, to stop Hitagi attacking him he shows her that the wound in his mouth, inflicted a few minutes previous, had already healed. They go to see Meme Oshino, who after hearing her situation explains that it was the weight crab (おもし蟹, omoshi kani), a god, that took her weight.
2	2	"Hitagi Crab, Part Two"; Transliteration: "Hitagi Kurabu Sono Ni" (Japanese: ひたぎクラブ 其ノ貳)	Tomoyuki Itamura	Nobuyuki Takeuchi	July 10, 2009
At her home, Hitagi Senjōgahara contemplates her past as she showers, while Koyomi waits for her. Earlier Hitagi was told to wash and change her clothes by Meme Oshino, who arranges for all of them to meet at midnight. Back at Hitagi's home, Koyomi argues with Hitagi while she gets dressed in front of him. Later that evening they meet Oshino, he explains that they are not going to attack the crab god but instead pray to it. They go before an altar, Oshino instructs her to relax, he then asks her a series of questions. His final question results in Hitagi retelling about how her mother joined a cult when Hitagi was sick, and that one night her mother brought a higher up, from the cult, home. Hitagi injured him as he attempted to sexually assault her, her mother watching without aiding her. As a result her family was broken apart; Hitagi feels that she is responsible. She opens her eyes to find a crab facing her. Koyomi and Oshino are unable to see the glowing yellow eyed, red word-bound form of the giant crab. When Hitagi is then attacked by crab god, Oshino is forced to intervene - this allows her to beg the crab for her feeling and memories - and they are returned. In a flashback it is explained how her mother joined the cult, and how the attack on Hitagi resulted in a broken family; that she met a crab which took her feelings (思い, omoi) (weight (重み, omomi)) and memories of her mother. Hitagi now has her memories and feeling of her mother back, and even though she has forever lost her mother, she admits to be glad to have become Koyomi's friend. In the morning Koyomi finds that his weight has been increased as a result of the crab god's mistake.
3	3	"Mayoi Mai Mai, Part One"; Transliteration: "Mayoi Maimai Sono Ichi" (Japanese: まよいマイマイ 其ノ壹)	Tomoyuki Itamura	Nobuyuki Takeuchi	July 17, 2009
On Mother's Day Koyomi sits in the center of a vast playground, reminiscing about his family, and his mountain bike. He sees a young, lost girl, Mayoi Hachikuji, whom he does not know, who later leaves. Hitagi Senjōgahara arrives and they proceed to have a strained conversation while they use the playground equipment. She wants to pay him back for helping her, but he declines all her proposals. Later Koyomi spots the lost girl looking at the map again, leaving Hitagi behind he goes over to her to see if he can help her. After she refuses his help, and later ignores him, Koyomi surprises her by hitting her head into the sign. During a hostile exchange Mayoi introduces herself. They get into a brawl, ending with Koyomi as the winner. Koyomi proceeds to get aid from Hitagi, who used to live in the area, about helping Mayoi find her way. Mayoi mentions that she is actually a lost Mai Mai, but drops the subject immediately.
4	4	"Mayoi Mai Mai, Part Two"; Transliteration: "Mayoi Maimai Sono Ni" (Japanese: まよいマイマイ 其ノ貳)	Yoshinobu Tokumoto	Nobuyuki Takeuchi	July 24, 2009
After talking with Mayoi, Koyomi discovers that the young girl is trying to get to her mother's house. However, as he, Mayoi, and Hitagi try to make their way to the address, they keep getting inexplicably lost. Assuming Mayoi has fallen victim to an apparition, Koyomi decides to send Hitagi off to find Oshino while he stays behind with Mayoi. Mayoi mentions that she has always been trying to get to her mother's house, but can never seem to get there. She and Koyomi get into an argument and briefly fight. Tsubasa then arrives, saying that she was passing by. She asks Koyomi about his relationship with Hitagi, but he isn't able to give her a definite answer. After Tsubasa leaves, Koyomi receives a call from Oshino, who says that he has given Hitagi instructions on how to solve Mayoi's problem.
5	5	"Mayoi Mai Mai, Part Three"; Transliteration: "Mayoi Maimai Sono San" (Japanese: まよいマイマイ 其ノ參)	Yoshito Mikamo	Nobuyuki Takeuchi	July 31, 2009
While waiting for Hitagi to arrive, Koyomi begins to find out more about Mayoi's life. She is the only child of a couple that had undergone a bitter divorce. Mayoi was put under the custody of her father, and had any contact with her mother deliberately cut off to the point where Mayoi could barely recognize the face of her mother. Hitagi then arrives and apologizes to Koyomi. She reveals that Mayoi does not exist, as she is actually dead. As a ghost, a lost Mai Mai, she can only be seen by those who have a subconscious desire not to return home, and is meant to waylay people who do not really want to arrive at their destinations. As a result, Hitagi could not see Mayoi and didn't say anything because she feared that she might be "different" again. The information Oshino provides - as a ghost Mayoi cannot adapt to changes that occurred after her death, thus she cannot lead them astray if they only use roads built thereafter - helps them find Mayoi's mother's house, but it is a vacant lot. However, Mayoi is happy and disappears, saying she's finally home. Afterwards, Hitagi admits that she is in love with Koyomi, and she is deeply intrigued by his desire to help anyone in need. Koyomi responds to her feelings with the precondition that they would not hide things from each other. At the end of the episode, Koyomi runs into Mayoi again, who states that she has been "promoted" from a lost soul to a wandering spirit and that she'd like to visit Koyomi from time to time.
6	6	"Suruga Monkey, Part One"; Transliteration: "Suruga Monkī Sono Ichi" (Japanese: するがモンキー 其ノ壹)	Jun Fukuta	Tatsuya Oishi; Michio Fukuda	August 8, 2009
Koyomi needs to study for upcoming exams and is on his way to Hitagi's house for help. On the way there, Mayoi teases him about his one-on-one "study" session. Suruga Kanbaru, an underclassman, meets him as she is running, and she voices her admiration for him. Koyomi tries to get her to leave, however he is unable to until Hitagi is mentioned, at which point Suruga runs off. At the study session with Hitagi, the two discuss their future after high school, but things quickly deteriorate when Koyomi mentions Suruga. Hitagi and Suruga were friends in middle school and Suruga may have even had a crush on her, but they had a falling-out in high school. After studying, Koyomi calls Tsubasa for more details about them, but she warns him to mind his relationship with Hitagi and not to dig too deeply into her past too quickly. On his way to Oshino to drop Hitagi's payment off, Koyomi is viciously attacked by a person wearing a raincoat. During the fight he sees that the assailant has bandages dangling from its left arm. Koyomi is left bruised and bleeding on railroad tracks. Hitagi finds him lying there and tells him that he had forgotten the payment that he was supposed to be delivering.
7	7	"Suruga Monkey, Part Two"; Transliteration: "Suruga Monkī Sono Ni" (Japanese: するがモンキー 其ノ貳)	Toshimasa Suzuki	Tatsuya Oishi	August 21, 2009
Hitagi says she believes that Koyomi was hit by a car. He says he stumbled, which she seems to accept. Koyomi goes to Suruga's house, and finds that her room is filled with red books. She apologizes for beating him up the previous night. Koyomi asks about her unnatural strength, and she reveals that she literally has a monkey's paw. She also bluntly states that she is a lesbian, which is hard for Koyomi to swallow. Koyomi then takes Suruga to visit Oshino for help, where he determines that the arm is actually a lesser devil's, since a monkey's paw doesn't attach itself to its owner. As such, the arm will take Suruga's soul once three wishes are fulfilled.
8	8	"Suruga Monkey, Part Three"; Transliteration: "Suruga Monkī Sono San" (Japanese: するがモンキー 其ノ參)	Tatsuya Oishi	Tatsuya Oishi; Michio Fukuda	August 28, 2009
Inheriting a mummified hand from her mother, Suruga first wished on it to run quickly so that she could win a local race in 4th grade. Soon after, four of the competitors were hospitalized due to an assault from a monster dressed in a raincoat. Suruga suspected the hand may be acting like a monkey's paw, wherein a wish is granted in an unexpected way. She abstained from wishing upon the arm for many years, coming close once to wish for help with Hitagi's crab problem, but such a wish would probably not have been granted, as the arm only manifests negative wishes, especially the hidden intentions of them (such as the students being beat up, revenge for Suruga's being outcast). However, after seeing Koyomi and Hitagi in a relationship, she became insanely jealous, and wished upon the arm to be with Hitagi, without noticing that the hand had grown into an arm and attached itself to her. Oshino surmises that her first granted wish had already caused the devil to take a portion of her soul, leading to the hand's growth. He offers the solution of cutting off the arm, a suitable price in exchange for nearly killing Koyomi (a result of the hidden side of her second wish). Koyomi objects to this, and instead, opts to defeat the devil to dissolve its contract. To prepare for the fight, he gives some of his blood to Shinobu in order to boost his limited vampiric powers. Despite that, he still gets literally shredded apart by the devil, and is saved at the last moment by Oshino's intervention. He called for Hitagi, who notes that Koyomi had hidden the entire situation from her, against his precondition for their relationship. With her appearance, the devil is unable to continue the attack without invalidating either half of the wish, so the contract is dissolved. However, even though the devil is gone, her arm still has not fully recovered. In the end, she becomes good friends with both Koyomi and Hitagi.
9	9	"Nadeko Snake, Part One"; Transliteration: "Nadeko Suneiku Sono Ichi" (Japanese: なでこスネイク 其ノ壹)	Tatsuya Oishi; Toshimasa Suzuki; Shin Ōnuma	Nobuhiro Sugiyama	September 4, 2009
Koyomi and Suruga travel to an abandoned shrine to place a talisman at Oshino's request. As they climb the mountain the shrine is located on, they pass a girl running down the path, who exchanges only brief glances before continuing in the other direction. Once they reach the shrine, Koyomi and Suruga discover a number of dismembered snake corpses in what appears to be some sort of ritual. They both quickly decide to leave. The next day, Tsubasa accompanies Koyomi to a bookstore to help him pick some study guides. Tsubasa warns Koyomi that his being kind to everyone, and Suruga in particular, may well put his relationship with Hitagi at risk, if he doesn't begin to set boundaries. He is surprised to learn she intends to travel the world instead of attending college after graduating. She leaves after getting a sudden headache. Koyomi then meets the girl again, who he finally realizes is Nadeko Sengoku, a friend of his sisters whom he met as a child. He and Suruga intercept her at the shrine, and return to Koyomi's house. Once there, Nadeko takes off her clothes, revealing snake scale-like marks on her skin, and pleads for Koyomi to save her.
10	10	"Nadeko Snake, Part Two"; Transliteration: "Nadeko Suneiku Sono Ni" (Japanese: なでこスネイク 其ノ貳)	Yoshito Mikamo	Ei Aoki	September 11, 2009
Oshino informs Koyomi that Nadeko is under the effects of a Snake Constrictor, a snake spirit that slowly constricts the life out of its victim. Nadeko explains that it is a curse a classmate placed on her after Nadeko inadvertently rejected the confession of a boy the classmate liked. Normally, a curse placed by an amateur would be harmless, but Nadeko accidentally made the curse worse by performing her ritual at the shrine, which has been corrupted by Shinobu's presence. Koyomi obtains a special charm that will banish the Snake Constrictor and they return to the shrine. While the ritual is seemingly successful, Koyomi realizes that Nadeko is under the attack of two Snake Constrictors, the second being placed by the rejected boy. Once the first one is banished, Koyomi is forced to battle the second to keep it from killing Nadeko. He and Suruga manage to chase it off, but Koyomi feels guilty for not being able to destroy it, as the Snake Constrictor will return to the person who originally placed the curse.
11	11	"Tsubasa Cat, Part One"; Transliteration: "Tsubasa Kyatto Sono Ichi" (Japanese: つばさキャット 其ノ壹)	Tomoyuki Itamura	Tomoyuki Itamura	September 18, 2009
After a flashback to the events during Golden Week (episode 27-30: Tsubasa Family), Koyomi finds Nadeko waiting in front of his school and they talk about how Shinobu looked at her and Suruga with a different gaze than at Koyomi and Oshino. Tsubasa appears and Nadeko leaves abruptly; Tsubasa tells Koyomi that some classmates and teachers think he has become a bad influence to Hitagi in school. Tsubasa gets a headache again and Koyomi suspects it might be induced by stress as it was during Golden Week: Flashbacks show how Tsubasa turned into a white "cat-woman" and attacked people by absorbing their vitality. Oshino revealed the problem is caused by a huge amount of stress built up in Tsubasa over the years, due to her problematic family background. Koyomi acted as bait to attract the cat and Shinobu bit her, draining her energy until she turned back into Tsubasa.
12	12	"Tsubasa Cat, Part Two"; Transliteration: "Tsubasa Kyatto Sono Ni" (Japanese: つばさキャット 其ノ貳)	Tatsuya Oishi; Toshimasa Suzuki	Tomoyuki Itamura	September 25, 2009
Hitagi and Koyomi are having lunch. She teases him and "asks" him to go on a date in a very roundabout fashion. He comes late but Hitagi doesn't seem to mind. While Hitagi's father drives them, Koyomi is teased, much to his discomfort and Hitagi's amusement. She leaves him with her father, who tells Koyomi that he can't be there for her often and asks Koyomi to take care of her. Hitagi returns, taking him to an area where she has laid a blanket on the ground. They lay down and she tells him that the stars are all she has to give to him. She tells him that she loves him and Koyomi reciprocates. In the final exchange, she asks him to kiss her in the same manner she asked him out at the beginning of the episode.
13	13	"Tsubasa Cat, Part Three"; Transliteration: "Tsubasa Kyatto Sono San" (Japanese: つばさキャット 其ノ參)	Toshimasa Suzuki	Toshimasa Suzuki	November 3, 2009 (ONA)
On his way to school, Koyomi finds Mayoi in the middle of the street and assaults her in a teasing manner. Mayoi panics and breaks his finger. Later, Mayoi tells Koyomi that she saw Shinobu at the donut store. Koyomi goes to the school bike rack and gets a text from Tsubasa, asking him to ditch school and come to the playground. He finds her there still in her pajamas and wearing a hat. They talk about her recent headaches and Koyomi persuades her to take her hat off. He finds out that she had grown cat ears. They agree to go to Oshino's place. When they reach there, they find him crouching, burying something in the dirt. Oshino asks them to come in and hits the side of Tsubasa's head, knocking her out. Oshino tells Koyomi that at that point, she was already half cat. Tsubasa's hair turns white, and the cat is revealed.
14	14	"Tsubasa Cat, Part Four"; Transliteration: "Tsubasa Kyatto Sono Yon" (Japanese: つばさキャット 其ノ肆)	Tomoyuki Itamura	Tomoyuki Itamura	February 23, 2010 (ONA)
After suppressing the cat, Oshino explains Tsubasa's situation to Koyomi. Koyomi realizes that he may need Shinobu's powers to help him bottle up the oddity. The problem escalates when Koyomi learns that Shinobu has gone missing. Enlisting the help of his friends, he looks for Shinobu to no avail. The cat soon escapes from Oshino, then goes after Koyomi; this time, however, she sides with him and aids in searching for Shinobu. The two have conversations regarding Koyomi's interactions with oddities while they scour the city. The search proves to be difficult even with the cat's keen sense of smell and hearing. The conversation gradually switches over to Tsubasa's situation. The cat explains that there is a way to confine her without relying on a vampire, that she is the personification of Tsubasa's stress, and that she knows exactly what is causing it. She remarks that Koyomi can deal with it easily. The oddity then reveals that Tsubasa being possessed by the cat was because of the stress that she felt from her unrequited love for Koyomi, and that the oddity itself may be sealed away for good if Koyomi falls in love with Tsubasa.
15	15	"Tsubasa Cat, Part Five"; Transliteration: "Tsubasa Kyatto Sono Go" (Japanese: つばさキャット 其ノ伍)	Tatsuya Oishi	Tatsuya Oishi	June 25, 2010 (ONA)
Koyomi is confused after hearing from the cat that Tsubasa loved him. After arguing with the cat that "it was a mistake", the cat tells him that there is another way to suppress the stress for good, to kill him. Koyomi thinks that he could agree with this because he owes Tsubasa his life, but Hitagi and her vow to avenge him come to his mind and he decides he does not want to die. The cat tells him that no one would help him in this situation. Koyomi calls out Shinobu's name yelling for her help, and the vampire girl suddenly appears from Koyomi's shadow - apparently just as planned by the cat who had him move to a position where he would cast enough of a shadow before. Everything is settled after Shinobu bites the cat's neck and it reverts to Tsubasa. The next day before school starts, Koyomi goes to Oshino's place to bring Shinobu back to him. It seems that nothing is left in the ruined cram school that used to be Oshino's place. After school, Koyomi, Hitagi, Suruga and Tsubasa go back to Oshino's place searching for him, but to no avail. Koyomi concludes that Oshino believed he could handle the problems concerning Tsubasa and Shinobu by himself.

=== Nisemonogatari ===
Nisemonogatari was directed by Akiyuki Shinbo and Tomoyuki Itamura at Shaft, has animation character designs and chief animation direction by Akio Watanabe, Nobuhiro Sugiyama, and Hiroki Yamamura, and features music composed by Satoru Kōsaki. The series' scripts were written by Yukito Kizawa (Karen Bee) and Muneo Nakamoto (Tsukihi Phoenix) of Seven Days War under the supervision of Shinbo and Shaft. Episodes 5 and 6 were outsourced to other studios by Shaft: episode 5 to Digital Network Animation, and episode 6 to Doga Kobo. Openings 2 and 3 of the series were also animated with assistance from Point Pictures.

The season features four pieces of theme music: three opening themes, and one ending theme. "Naisho no Hanashi" (ナイショの話; lit. "Secret Story"), the ending theme, was sung by ClariS and written by Ryo of Supercell. Each of the opening themes was again composed by Satoru Kōsaki, written by Meg Rock, and sung by members of the female cast. The first opening, "Futakotome" (二言目, lit. "Second Word"), was sung by Chiwa Saitō (Hitagi Senjougahara); the second opening, "marshmallow justice", was sung by Eri Kitamura (Karen Araragi); and the third opening, "Platinum Disco" (白金ディスコ), was sung by Yuka Iguchi (Tsukihi Araragi).

Type	Arc	Director	Storyboard artist	Animation director
Opening	Karen Bee, eps 1 and 3	Naoyuki Tatsuwa	Naoyuki Tatsuwa	Akio Watanabe
Opening	Karen Bee, eps 2 and 5–6	Yukio Takatsu	Yukio Takatsu	Yukio Takatsu
Opening	Tsukihi Phoenix	Yukio Takatsu	Yukio Takatsu	Yukio Takatsu
Ending	All arcs	Hajime Ueda	—N/a	—N/a

No. overall	No. in season	Title	Directed by	Storyboard artist	Original release date
16	1	"Karen Bee, Part One"; Transliteration: "Karen Bī Sono Ichi" (Japanese: かれんビー 其ノ壹)	Tomoyuki Itamura	Tomoyuki Itamura	January 7, 2012
Koyomi wakes up just to find he is in an unknown location held captive. It happens to be Hitagi that captured and imprisoned him. She says she is doing so in order to protect him. Hitagi also takes this opportunity to tease Koyomi, which she takes great joy out of doing so. Going back to the morning of the day, Koyomi is involved in a short fix with Tsukihi after hearing that Karen is out, assuming she is making trouble. Koyomi then remembers Nadeko's invitation to her home in the past, so he decides to give Nadeko a call to see if she is free and wants to hang out with him. While on the way, Koyomi stumbles across Mayoi and decides to spend some time with her first. They talk for a long time while Mayoi gives Koyomi some friendly advice. Mayoi says that she will come back when she needs his help and that she will tell when she will leave for good. Koyomi remembers that Oshino said that same thing to him before leaving the town.
17	2	"Karen Bee, Part Two"; Transliteration: "Karen Bī Sono Ni" (Japanese: かれんビー 其ノ貳)	Yuki Yase	Yuki Yase	January 14, 2012
On the same day, only a while after parting ways with Mayoi, Koyomi arrives at Nadeko's to spend some time playing with her, despite learning that her parents are not home. Nadeko is seen styling a different hairstyle than what she previously had. They spend their time talking and playing games. Nadeko becomes frantic after hearing her mother come home because she did not tell her that Koyomi was coming over. Koyomi leaves Nadeko's house and then decides to call Suruga about her asking Koyomi for help in cleaning her room. On his way to Suruga's house, Koyomi meets his sister, Karen, who is in a rush doing some "community service" before leaving in a hurry after receiving a phone call. Koyomi then visits Suruga to find an unexpected sight.
18	3	"Karen Bee, Part Three"; Transliteration: "Karen Bī Sono San" (Japanese: かれんビー 其ノ參)	Yukihiro Miyamoto; Shunsuke Ishikawa	Tomoyuki Itamura	January 20, 2012
Koyomi stumbles on an intriguing figure who introduces himself as Deishū Kaiki, on his way back from Suruga's house. Koyomi then meets Hitagi coincidentally on the street. They start to walk with each other but when Koyomi mentions that he has met Kaiki, Hitagi knocks him out. Hitagi confesses that Kaiki was a con man who deceived her mother and is a dangerous person she wants him to avoid at all costs, which is her reason for imprisoning him. Koyomi then receives a text message from his younger sister asking for help. After seeing the text, Koyomi breaks free from the handcuffs with the help of his vampire strength. Hitagi still does not want Koyomi to leave and tells him that she is willing to fight if he does not comply with her. Hitagi answers the phone, abruptly frantic and seeming to be at the mercy of the speaker. After the phone call, Hitagi agrees to let Koyomi pass without a fight. When Koyomi asks who the caller was, Hitagi states that it was Tsubasa.
19	4	"Karen Bee, Part Four"; Transliteration: "Karen Bī Sono Yon" (Japanese: かれんビー 其ノ肆)	Yuki Yase	Yuki Yase	January 27, 2012
Back at his house, Koyomi meets Tsubasa who is helping Tsukihi tend to a feverish Karen. It turns out that Tsubasa has been helping Karen with her "mission". Koyomi gets angry at Karen for doing something dangerous and getting assistance from Tsubasa without his knowledge. Tsubasa and Koyomi then go to his room to talk about what happened. After talking with Tsubasa, Koyomi goes to take a bath. While taking his bath, Shinobu emerges from his shadow and joins him in the bath. Koyomi is shocked to find that Shinobu is actually very talkative. Shinobu then tells Koyomi that Karen was inflicted by a lethal, supernatural bee. The bee sting causes an extremely high fever and makes the inflicted person feel as if they are on fire.
20	5	"Karen Bee, Part Five"; Transliteration: "Karen Bī Sono Go" (Japanese: かれんビー 其ノ伍)	Yoshito Mikamo	Takashi Kawabata	February 4, 2012
Koyomi learns from Tsukihi and Tsubasa that Karen tried to confront Kaiki by herself. Karen is inflicted with the poison by Kaiki during their confrontation and Kaiki escapes, leaving Karen paralyzed on the floor from the poison. After walking Tsubasa home, Koyomi tends to Karen's fever. Karen tells Koyomi to leave her alone because she does not want to get him sick too. Koyomi then goes to the bathroom to ask Shinobu if there is any way to transfer Karen's fever to him. Shinobu says there is a way but she does not recommend it because it requires an unusual ritual.
21	6	"Karen Bee, Part Six"; Transliteration: "Karen Bī Sono Roku" (Japanese: かれんビー 其ノ陸)	Takashi Kawabata	Takashi Kawabata	February 11, 2012
Koyomi kisses his sister but manages to drain only half of the poison in Karen's body, so, although she is not completely healed, her fever has diminished. On his way to Hitagi's house, Koyomi stumbles on Mayoi again and confides to her about his sister's situation. Upon arriving at Hitagi's house he finds out that Hitagi managed to arrange a meeting with Kaiki and is preparing herself to enact revenge on him. Koyomi explains to her about Kaiki's encounter with Karen and convinces her to not confront him without his help. Back at home, Koyomi learns from Tsukihi that Karen is missing, and worried that she might have left to face Kaiki once more, he asks Shinobu's help to find her.
22	7	"Karen Bee, Part Seven"; Transliteration: "Karen Bī Sono Nana" (Japanese: かれんビー 其ノ漆)	Naoyuki Tatsuwa	Mitsuru Sasaki	February 18, 2012
Thanks to Shinobu, Koyomi manages to find Karen and after a serious fight between them, he convinces her to let him deal with Kaiki by himself. Later that day, he and Hitagi come face to face to Kaiki, but they hear from him, much to their surprise, that he is already leaving the city and Karen should recover in a few days. After letting off all anguish she harbored on him all that time, Hitagi lets Kaiki leave unharmed, and claiming she can finally move on with her life, she asks Koyomi to spend the night with her. In the next day, Koyomi returns home to find that Karen is already fully recovered. Both "Fire Sisters" leave in a hurry, claiming that there is still work for them to do, due to all the damage Kaiki left behind among their classmates.
23	8	"Tsukihi Phoenix, Part One"; Transliteration: "Tsukihi Fenikkusu, Sono Ichi" (Japanese: つきひフェニックス 其ノ壹)	Tomoyuki Itamura	Tomoyuki Itamura	February 25, 2012
Koyomi is concentrating on his studies when he is interrupted by Karen who, much to his surprise, is wearing her sister Tsukihi's clothes, displaying an air more feminine than usual. Karen asks Koyomi to introduce her to Suruga knowing that she is friends with him, but he refuses without giving a reason, fearing that she would make a move on his sister. Karen then challenges her brother to a contest, making him promise to comply with her request if he loses. Koyomi then chooses the contents of the challenge: she would let him brush her teeth for five minutes without resisting, which she accepts. Surprisingly, both start getting more and more aroused as Koyomi brushes Karen's teeth until Tsukihi barges in demanding an explanation. Despite fearing what punishment Tsukihi has in store for them after she leaves and Koyomi accepting defeat, Karen asks him to continue from where they stopped.
24	9	"Tsukihi Phoenix, Part Two"; Transliteration: "Tsukihi Fenikkusu, Sono Ni" (Japanese: つきひフェニックス 其ノ貳)	Yukihiro Miyamoto; Shunsuke Ishikawa	Hajime Ootani	March 3, 2012
Koyomi sets for Suruga's house to introduce Karen to her as he promised. On their way they meet a woman introducing herself as Yozuru Kagenui, asking for directions. Koyomi asks for Tsubasa's help on his phone and learns from her that she is asking for the location of the same building Oshino was living with Shinobu. Before leaving, Yozuru asks Koyomi to give the same information to a certain girl when he meets her, and Karen states that despite Yozuru's strange behavior, she had the look and feel of being a fighter much stronger than her. After leaving Karen at Suruga's, Koyomi meets Mayoi upon returning home and they are approached by a girl introducing herself as Yotsugi Ononoki, asking for the same directions, just like Yozuru had predicted, and much to his surprise Koyomi finds that not only Yotsugi can see Mayoi, but both Yotsugi and Yozuru know about his and his friends' circumstances.
25	10	"Tsukihi Phoenix, Part Three"; Transliteration: "Tsukihi Fenikkusu, Sono San" (Japanese: つきひフェニックス 其ノ參)	Takashi Kawabata	Yoshiharu Ashino	March 10, 2012
Shinobu asks Koyomi to take her to the donut shop. Before leaving, he notices that the scar on Tsukihi's chest has healed, and, after stripping her naked, finds that all other scars on her body disappeared too. At the shop, Koyomi asks Shinobu if she knew anything about Yotsugi or Yozuru; but, much to his surprise, he finds Kaiki sitting on a nearby table and pays him up for information about them. Kaiki reveals that Yozuru and her familiar Yotsugi are supernatural hunters specializing in immortal beings. Wondering if he or Shinobu may be targeted by them, Koyomi returns home just to find both in front of it. When Tsukihi opens the door for them, Yotsugi instantly attacks her, tearing her body apart. A furious Koyomi launches himself at her, but is easily subdued by Yozuru, who shows him that surprisingly, Tsukihi's body is already restored. She also explains that the Tsukihi in front of him is not his true sister but a phoenix assuming her identity. Shinobu threatens to attack the duo, and Yozuru, despite knowing that the vampire has not enough power to stop her, decides to leave, promising to return in the following day to slay Tsukihi, killing both Koyomi and Shinobu too if they try to stop her again.
26	11	"Tsukihi Phoenix, Part Four"; Transliteration: "Tsukihi Fenikkusu, Sono Yon" (Japanese: つきひフェニックス 其ノ肆)	Yuki Yase	Shinsaku Sasaki	March 17, 2012
After learning from Shinobu that Tsukihi is actually a supernatural being that endlessly reincarnates as a human child after dying, Koyomi leaves Karen standing guard at their house's destroyed front door before setting to the place Oshino used to live to confront Yozuru and Yotsugi. To prepare for their clash, Shinobu consumes some of Koyomi's blood to recover part of her former strength and upon meeting the two, agrees to fight Yotsugi while her master deals with Yozuru. Yozuru reveals to Koyomi that she, Oshino and Kaiki were friends from college and it was Kaiki who told her about Tsukihi being a phoenix. After viciously hitting Koyomi, Yozuru learns that her partner was easily defeated by Shinobu, and just when she is about to confront the vampire, Koyomi rises again, claiming that he would never give up on his sister, no matter what kind of creature she is. Realizing his determination to protect Tsukihi and that he never fought with the intention to kill her, Yozuru decides to give up and leaves peacefully with her familiar. Koyomi returns home to check on Tsukihi and declares to her that he will soon introduce his girlfriend to his sisters. In the end, Koyomi is seen meeting Hitagi at a beach.

=== Nekomonogatari (Black) ===
Nekomonogatari (Black) was directed by Tomoyuki Itamura under the chief direction of Akiyuki Shinbo at Shaft, has animation character designs by Akio Watanabe, and features music composed by Satoru Kōsaki. Watanabe served as chief animation director alongside Shaft animator Nobuhiro Sugiyama. The season's scripts were written by Yukito Kizawa (episodes 1–2) and Muneo Nakamoto (episodes 3–4) of Seven Days War under the supervision of Shinbo and Shaft.

The season features two pieces of theme music: one opening theme, and one ending theme. "Kieru Daydream" (消えるdaydream; lit. "Vanishing Daydream"), the ending theme, was written by Saori Kodama, composed by Satoru Kōsaki, and sung by Marina Kawano. The opening theme, "perfect slumbers", was composed by Satoru Kōsaki, written by Meg Rock, and sung by cast member Yui Horie (Tsubasa Hanekawa).

Type	Director(s)
Opening	URA
Ending	Yukihiro Miyamoto; Takayuki Aizu; Hajime Ueda

No. overall	No. in season	Title	Directed by	Storyboard artist	Original release date
27	1	"Tsubasa Family, Part One"; Transliteration: "Tsubasa Famirī Sono Ichi" (Japanese: つばさファミリー 其ノ壹)	Takashi Kawabata	Takashi Kawabata	December 31, 2012
It's the beginning of Golden Week, before the events of Bakemonogatari. After Tsukihi kicks Koyomi out of bed, he takes the opportunity to ask her about his growing feelings for a new classmate of his, wondering if he has fallen in love with her. Tsukihi deduces he is merely sexually frustrated and suggests he buy some porn magazines to relieve himself. After a brief meeting with Karen, Koyomi leaves home on his bike, on the way encountering Tsubasa Hanekawa, his classmate, sporting a large bandage on her left cheek. Tsubasa confesses to him that she was hit in the face by her foster father and asks Koyomi to not tell anyone about it, offering to grant any request in exchange for his silence; however, Koyomi only asks her to let him use his blood to heal her wound.
28	2	"Tsubasa Family, Part Two"; Transliteration: "Tsubasa Famirī Sono Ni" (Japanese: つばさファミリー 其ノ貳)	Kenjirou Okada	Takashi Kawabata	December 31, 2012
Koyomi pays a visit to Oshino bringing him some donuts, but ends up giving them to Shinobu instead. Oshino asks Koyomi about his encounter with Tsubasa and learns from him that after having her wound healed, the two of them came across a dead silver cat with no tail, which Tsubasa buried. Oshino realizes that they had encountered a Cursed Cat (障り猫, Sawari Neko) and asks Koyomi to look for Tsubasa while he investigates the buried cat. Later that night, Koyomi comes across Tsubasa, possessed by the cat and dragging her unconscious parents along with her. Koyomi tries to stop her, but she flees after tearing off his left arm. After calling an ambulance for her parents and reattaching his arm, Koyomi wakes up at Oshino's place beside Shinobu and learns from him that he had been asleep for over twelve hours, and that Shinobu has been staying beside him to help his recovery. Oshino also claims that Tsubasa is now beyond help and leaves to confront her after asking Koyomi to stay out of his way.
29	3	"Tsubasa Family, Part Three"; Transliteration: "Tsubasa Famirī Sono San" (Japanese: つばさファミリー 其ノ參)	Tomoyuki Itamura	Tomoyuki Itamura	December 31, 2012
Koyomi breaks into Tsubasa's house and is shocked to discover that she does not have her own room there. He rushes back home, where he learns from Tsukihi that people all over the city are being attacked by a mysterious cat-girl (化け猫, bakeneko), who he realizes must be Tsubasa. When classes resume and Tsubasa never comes to school, Koyomi seeks out Oshino, who informs him that after challenging the Cursed Cat twenty times he was unable to defeat it even once. Although a Cursed Cat is usually a weak type of Oddity, this one has made use of Tsubasa's outstanding intelligence to outsmart him. He also warns that the cat must be stopped before its conscience merges fully with hers or rescuing Tsubasa will be impossible. The following day, Koyomi meets the cat, who asks him to stay out of its way, claiming that it will eventually return Tsubasa's body to her once it manages to relieve her of all her stress. Unable to stop her from leaving, Koyomi realizes that his feelings for Tsubasa have surpassed even love, proclaiming that he is ready to die for her if necessary.
30	4	"Tsubasa Family, Part Four"; Transliteration: "Tsubasa Famirī Sono Yon" (Japanese: つばさファミリー 其ノ肆)	Tomoyuki Itamura	Tomoyuki Itamura	December 31, 2012
After Koyomi spends several days begging for Shinobu's help, she entrusts him with the demon sword (妖刀, yōtō) "Heartspan" (心渡, Kokoro Watari), able to kill Oddities without harming the humans they possess. Koyomi manages to lure Tsubasa to Oshino's place by sending her an e-mail claiming he is under attack by a vampire, but instead of comforting her, he berates Tsubasa for allowing herself to be possessed, prompting her to attack him. After Tsubasa slices Koyomi's body in half, it is revealed that it was all part of his plan to have herself cut with the sword, which was concealed in his body. However, Tsubasa refuses to let the Cursed Cat leave her body, and Shinobu appears to restore Koyomi's body and to bring Tsubasa back to normal. The next day, Tsubasa has returned to her normal life with no memories of what happened. Oshino suggests Koyomi marry Tsubasa in order to give her the family she always wanted; but Koyomi replies that, despite truly caring for her, he would never be able to fall in love with her. Some time later, Koyomi is about to meet Hitagi for the first time, leading to the events of Bakemonogatari.

=== Nekomonogatari (White) ===
Nekomonogatari (White) was directed by Tomoyuki Itamura under the chief direction of Akiyuki Shinbo at Shaft, has animation character designs by Akio Watanabe, and features music composed by Satoru Kōsaki. Watanabe, Shaft animator Nobuhiro Sugiyama, and Taisuke Iwasaki served as chief animation directors; and the season's scripts were written by Yukito Kizawa (episodes 1–2, 4–5) and Muneo Nakamoto (episode 3) of Seven Days War under the supervision of Shinbo and Shaft. One episode was outsourced outside of Shaft: episode 4 to Studio CJT.

The season features two pieces of theme music: one opening theme, and one ending theme. "Ai o Utae" (アイヲウタエ; lit. "Sing of Love"), the ending theme, was produced by Jin (Shizen no Teki-P) and sung by Luna Haruna. The opening theme, "chocolate insomnia", was composed by Satoru Kōsaki, written by Meg Rock, and sung by cast member Yui Horie (Tsubasa Hanekawa).

Type	Director	Animation director
Opening	URA	Akio Watanabe
Ending	Yukihiro Miyamoto; Takayuki Aizu; Hajime Ueda	—N/a

No. overall	No. in season	Title	Directed by	Storyboard artist	Original release date
31	1	"Tsubasa Tiger, Part One"; Transliteration: "Tsubasa Taigā Sono Ichi" (Japanese: つばさタイガー 其ノ壹)	Kenjirou Okada	Tomoyuki Itamura	July 6, 2013
It's the beginning of the second semester and on her way to the first day of school, Tsubasa has a short meeting with Mayoi who reveals that she has just came from Koyomi's house where she forgot her backpack, but could not retrieve it as he was not at home by that time. Soon after, Tsubasa has an encounter with an apparition in the form of a huge white tiger who just passes by her and upon arriving at school she tells Hitagi about it. Hitagi points out that though Koyomi is the best person to assist her, Tsubasa did not call for his help at all, also remembering that he always stood for them without the need of asking him. Some time later, Tsubasa and Hitagi watch smoke rising from afar and Tsubasa discovers that her house is on fire. With her house destroyed and no place to sleep, Tsubasa claims to her parents that she will sleep at a friend's house, but she decides to spend the night at the abandoned cram school where Oshino lived instead. After learning about her situation, Hitagi looks for her and upon finding Tsubasa, she takes her to her house, suspecting that the white tiger she saw might have some connection with the fire. After deciding to skip school for the next day, Hitagi and Tsubasa receive a mail from Koyomi, where he states that he must leave for a while to deal with some business of his and as they are about to take a bath together, Hitagi asks Tsubasa if she still loves Koyomi. Tsubasa instantly replies that she does.
32	2	"Tsubasa Tiger, Part Two"; Transliteration: "Tsubasa Taigā Sono Ni" (Japanese: つばさタイガー 其ノ貳)	Sumito Sasaki	Hiroko Kazui	July 13, 2013
As her parents still had not found another place to live, Tsubasa keeps staying at Hitagi's place. However, it is later revealed that the recent events had such an impact on Tsubasa that she is once again possessed by the Cursed Cat. The possessed Tsubasa sneaks away from Hitagi's house to confront the tiger she had met previously, as, according to her, the fire at her house was caused by it. After a fierce confrontation with the apparition, Tsubasa returns to Hitagi's house just to find her awake and waiting for her. Since Hitagi was already aware of the Cursed Cat, she was not surprised upon meeting it. In the next day, Tsubasa is back to normal with no memories of her possession like usual and, for some reason, Hitagi asks her once again if she is really in love with Koyomi.
33	3	"Tsubasa Tiger, Part Three"; Transliteration: "Tsubasa Taigā Sono San" (Japanese: つばさタイガー 其ノ參)	Yoshitaka Nagaoka	Hiroko Kazui	July 20, 2013
Following her question, Hitagi points out to Tsubasa that despite being similar at willing to help others, she and Koyomi are too different in everything else, including how Tsubasa is too innocent to realize if someone could approach her with malice. On the same day, Tsubasa meets Suruga at the school and learns from her that Koyomi had sent a message to her, and from the message she deduces that he wants to meet her later that night at the abandoned cram school. Upon returning to Hitagi's house, where she meets her father, Tsubasa relays to her what she learned from Suruga, and both agree to not meddle in Koyomi's affairs this time. They are later visited by Karen and Tsukihi who offer their house for Tsubasa to take shelter. Tsubasa accepts their offer, just to later learn that she must sleep in Koyomi's room. In the middle of the night, Tsubasa is possessed again and Shinobu appears before her, claiming that her connection with Koyomi was severed and she is looking for him. The possessed Tsubasa not only reveals about Koyomi's meeting with Suruga, but also offers herself to help her get there faster, but just as the two arrive at the cram school, they find the whole place burned to the ground.
34	4	"Tsubasa Tiger, Part Four"; Transliteration: "Tsubasa Taigā Sono Yon" (Japanese: つばさタイガー 其ノ肆)	Kenjirou Okada	Nobuhiro Sugiyama	July 27, 2013
Tsubasa awakens in the next day at the Araragi house and finds out that she was possessed again. As she leaves the house, she is stopped by Koyomi's mother, Mrs. Araragi. The mother explains that while having Tsubasa as a guest is no burden to them, she should not consider the Araragi family as her own. Mrs. Araragi also explains that averting one's eyes from the truth isn't running away from the problem, mentioning Tsubasa's strained relationship with her own parents. Later, while walking through a park, Tsubasa encounters a man named "Mr. Episode", who is a half-vampire and who once almost killed her. He was also accompanied by a woman named Izuko Gaen, whom Meme referred to as his senpai. Gaen claims she knows everything, but surprises Tsubasa when she shows her knowledge on Tsubasa's feelings towards Koyomi as well as her tiger problem. Gaen and Mr. Episode depart, after saying that Tsubasa's problem is her own, and only she can solve it. Tsubasa goes to the library to research "Kako", what Gaen called the Tiger, but finds nothing. She calls Hitagi, whom expresses her concern that Gaen named the Tiger "Kako" herself, to illustrate that "Gaen" was the maiden name of Kanbaru and her mother. Hitagi explains that Tsubasa and the burnings are linked, as, wherever Tsubasa sleeps, the place burns down soon after; Hitagi and Koyomi's houses may eventually be included. Tsubasa returns to the Araragi house, to be forced into a game of cards with Karen and Tsukihi. They discuss what the words "fire" and "flame" mean and the sister's boyfriends. Tsubasa explains that Koyomi refuses to acknowledge the sister's boyfriends because of envy, then realizes that she is being jealous. As she prepares to confront the tiger, Tsubasa believes that she may never be able to see Koyomi again, and after attempting to leave her own mark in Koyomi's room so he remembers her, she takes a picture of herself and sends it to someone, and writes a note to her other self, in hopes that they can share each other's knowledge and feelings.
35	5	"Tsubasa Tiger, Part Five"; Transliteration: "Tsubasa Taigā Sono Go" (Japanese: つばさタイガー 其ノ伍)	Tomoyuki Itamura; URA (Note: Hanekawa's Letter (羽川の手紙) section.)	Tomoyuki Itamura; URA	August 3, 2013
In her letter to the cat spirit, Tsubasa reveals that just like her, Kako is another apparition sired by her repressed feelings, this time of jealousy, and asks her to return both to her heart, as she is finally determined to shoulder all of her negative feelings no matter how it will change herself. As Kako is about to burn Hitagi's apartment, Tsubasa appears to confront it. Despite having no chance to defeat Kako, Tsubasa manages to stall it long enough for Koyomi to appear and defeat it with Heartspan. Before absorbing both the cat and tiger spirit, Tsubasa finally confesses her love for Koyomi, and as expected, he rejects her, assuming that his love for Hitagi is stronger. After her family finally rents another house for them to live, it is revealed that Tsubasa's hair developed white stripes just like a tiger, that she hides by dying them black, and she had at last asked her parents for a room just for herself, as a sign that she finally had become a true member of her own family.

=== Kabukimonogatari ===
Kabukimonogatari was directed by Naoyuki Tatsuwa and Tomoyuki Itamura under the chief direction of Akiyuki Shinbo at Shaft, has animation character designs by Akio Watanabe, and features music composed by Satoru Kōsaki. Watanabe, Shaft animator Nobuhiro Sugiyama, and Taisuke Iwasaki served as chief animation directors; and the season's scripts were written by Yukito Kizawa (episodes 1, 3–4) and Muneo Nakamoto (episode 2) of Write Works under the supervision of Shinbo and Shaft. The opening theme was produced with assistance from Cyclone Graphics.

The season features two pieces of theme music: one opening theme, and one ending theme. "Ai o Utae" (アイヲウタエ; lit. "Sing of Love"), from Nekomonogatari (White), was again used as the ending theme for this season. The opening theme, "happy bite", was composed by Satoru Kōsaki, written by Meg Rock, and sung by cast member Emiri Katō (Mayoi Hachikuji).

Type	Director	Animation director
Opening	Tsuguyasu Uchiyama	Akio Watanabe
Ending	Yukihiro Miyamoto; Takayuki Aizu; Hajime Ueda	—N/a

No. overall	No. in season	Title	Directed by	Storyboard artist	Original release date
36	1	"Mayoi Jiangshi, Part One"; Transliteration: "Mayoi Kyonshī Sono Ichi" (Japanese: まよいキョンシー 其ノ壹)	Naoyuki Tatsuwa	Naoyuki Tatsuwa	August 17, 2013
It's the last day of summer vacation and Koyomi looks for Mayoi to return the backpack she left behind at his house. On the way, he has an encounter with Yotsugi who reveals that just like him and Mayoi, she once died, but while Koyomi was transformed into an immortal being and Mayoi became a ghost, she was revived by Yuzuru as a shikigami to serve under her. With no sign of Mayoi, and with Yotsugi's words on his mind, Koyomi returns home and keeps thinking about what he could do for Mayoi until he is reminded by Shinobu that he has only a few hours to finish his summer homework. He then ponders if he could return to the past to finish it in time and, much to his surprise, Shinobu reveals that it is possible. At an abandoned temple, Shinobu opens a portal to the past and they pass through it intending to reach the previous day, but, some time later, they realize that they have traveled to eleven years in the past instead.
37	2	"Mayoi Jiangshi, Part Two"; Transliteration: "Mayoi Kyonshī Sono Ni" (Japanese: まよいキョンシー 其ノ貳)	Chika Nagaoka	Yasuhiro Nakura	August 24, 2013
Realizing that he has time-traveled to a day before Mayoi's death, Koyomi decides to save her and prevent her becoming a ghost. While looking for directions, he and Shinobu meet a six-year-old Tsubasa who, suspicious of him, points them to the nearby police station. There they learn Mayoi's address and return on the following day planning to guide her safely to her mother's house. However, after hours of waiting, Mayoi's father appears, begging their help in finding his daughter, who had run away early in the morning. Koyomi manages to meet Mayoi at the same place where they first met, and succeeds in saving her from being hit by a truck and in preventing her death. Koyomi and Shinobu return to the present, their job now done, but upon arrival, they realize something is very wrong: the world has been annihilated.
38	3	"Mayoi Jiangshi, Part Three"; Transliteration: "Mayoi Kyonshī Sono San" (Japanese: まよいキョンシー 其ノ參)	Kei Ajiki; Tsuguyasu Uchiyama (Note: Oshino's Letter (忍野の手紙) section.)	Shinsaku Sasaki	August 31, 2013
Returning to the present, Koyomi and Shinobu find the whole city deserted and it does not take long for them to realize that it was a consequence of saving Mayoi's life in the past. Based on the date of the most recent newspaper they found, they come to the conclusion that something dire happened during the events of "Tsubasa Cat" and return to the shrine to look for a way to return to the past. However, they find that Oshino had put a different charm that prevents them from using its powers and when night falls they are suddenly surrounded by undead beings. After escaping, Shinobu realizes that the undead are not actually zombies, but vampires who lost their master, and that this master must be none other than herself. According to her conclusions, during "Tsubasa Cat," when Shinobu ran away from home, it was Mayoi who helped Koyomi find her (implying Shinobu merged with Koyomi's shadow unnoticed, when he was looking for her at the donut store after Mayoi had told him she had seen her there earlier). But because she never became a ghost in the current timeline, Mayoi never met Koyomi, and they never became friends. Thus, he never managed to find Shinobu, leading him to be killed by the Cursed Cat. As a consequence, Shinobu started a worldwide vampire infection (having previously pondered destroying the world) before eventually killing herself. Looking for survivors, Koyomi and Shinobu decide to use some fireworks to bring the attention of whoever managed to escape with their lives, but it ends up drawing the undead to them once more.
39	4	"Mayoi Jiangshi, Part Four"; Transliteration: "Mayoi Kyonshī Sono Yon" (Japanese: まよいキョンシー 其ノ肆)	Sumito Sasaki	Shinsaku Sasaki	September 7, 2013
A woman appears to drive out the undead by throwing rice at them. Much to his awe and joy, Koyomi learns that the woman is none other than a grown up Mayoi. He pretends not to know her, however, and they introduce themselves to each other. Mayoi recognises Koyomi's name, and gives him a letter from the man who taught her about the rice. This man was none other than Oshino, who somehow figured out what Koyomi had done. From the letter, Koyomi and Shinobu learn that when they traveled to the past, they had traveled to a whole different timeline. He, Kaiki Deishū, and Kagenui Yozuru have been working to stop this timeline's Shinobu, who is still alive, and return all the vampires back into normal humans. Instead of berating Koyomi for destroying the world, however, he praises him for saving Mayoi, and asks Koyomi as a friend that he and Shinobu save this world's Shinobu. After bidding farewell to the adult Mayoi, the pair return to the temple ruins and meet the alternate Shinobu, who cries tears of joy upon seeing that in another timeline, she managed to reunite with Koyomi, and offers to sacrifice herself to allow them to return to their own timeline. Back to their own rightful time, Koyomi realizes that he missed the opening ceremony much to his chagrin, and after Shinobu returns to his shadow, the ghost of Mayoi Hachikuji appears before him, and they take their time as they walk together to his house in order to return her backpack.

=== Otorimonogatari ===
Otorimonogatari was directed by Tomoyuki Itamura under the chief direction of Akiyuki Shinbo at Shaft, has animation character designs by Akio Watanabe, and features music composed by Satoru Kōsaki. Watanabe, Shaft animator Nobuhiro Sugiyama, and Taisuke Iwasaki served as chief animation directors; and the season's scripts were written by Yukito Kizawa of Write Works under the supervision of Shinbo and Shaft.

The season features two pieces of theme music: one opening theme, and one ending theme. "Sono Koe o Oboeteru" (その声を覚えてる; lit. "Remembering Your Voice"), the ending theme, was composed by Satoru Kōsaki, written by Saori Kodama, and sung by Marina Kawano. The opening theme, "Mōsō Express" (もうそう♥えくすぷれす, lit. "Delusion Express"), was composed by Satoru Kōsaki, written by Meg Rock, and sung by cast member Kana Hanazawa (Nadeko Sengoku).

Type	Director
Opening	Shin Oonuma
Ending	Yukihiro Miyamoto; Takayuki Aizu; Hajime Ueda

No. overall	No. in season	Title	Directed by	Storyboard artist	Original release date
40	1	"Nadeko Medusa, Part One"; Transliteration: "Nadeko Medūsa Sono Ichi" (Japanese: なでこメドゥーサ 其ノ壹)	Hiroyuki Tsuchiya	Takashi Kawabata	September 21, 2013
Fully transformed into an apparition, Nadeko confronts Shinobu and a battered Koyomi who attack with the intention of killing her, and envious of their relationship, she stabs Koyomi's heart. The story then retrocedes to some days before, in Halloween, when Nadeko, on her way to school has a short encounter with Ougi Oshino, Meme Oshino's niece, who is also a first year student from Koyomi's high school. For some reason, Ougi claims that it's time for Nadeko to stop always playing the victim before she leaves. At her school, Nadeko starts having visions of white snakes and calls Koyomi for advice, and they agree to meet at 10 PM at his house, as by that time Shinobu must be awake to provide some help. Soon after, Nadeko hears the voice of a snake instructing her to meet it at the shrine where she used to kill snakes instead and there it reveals itself as the giant apparition snake, Kuchinawa, who demands compensation for its fellow white snakes she killed by asking for a favor, to which she agrees.
41	2	"Nadeko Medusa, Part Two"; Transliteration: "Nadeko Medūsa Sono Ni" (Japanese: なでこメドゥーサ 其ノ貳)	Takaaki Suzuki	Yuki Yase	September 28, 2013
After lying to Koyomi claiming that she was just imagining things, Nadeko decides to help Kuchinawa find his lost corpse, but they agree that she will attend school as usual, while looking for his body at night. In the next day, during school, it is revealed that Nadeko's class is still in a bad mood due to the incident with Kaiki's charms, and thus the position of class rep was somewhat forced on her. Later at night, Nadeko sneaks out of her room to start looking for Kuchinawa's body and after following a false lead, she is found by Koyomi, who takes her to his house. It is then revealed that Nadeko's parents had realized she was missing and contacted Tsukihi, who lied to them claiming that she was sleeping there, while Koyomi left to look for her. After insinuating to Nadeko that they should sleep together, Koyomi is knocked out by Shinobu who appears before her and ponders on how convenient it is for her to have such a cute and defenseless demeanor before she drags Koyomi away to have him sleep on the couch.
42	3	"Nadeko Medusa, Part Three"; Transliteration: "Nadeko Medūsa Sono San" (Japanese: なでこメドゥーサ 其ノ參)	Kenjirou Okada	Fumie Muroi	October 5, 2013
Nadeko awakens in the next day with Tsukihi, who had snuck into Koyomi's bed with the intention of sleeping beside him, at her side. In the occasion, Tsukihi has Nadeko confess that she always was in love with her brother and realizes that the reason why she still harbors feelings for him it is because it makes easy for her to reject all other boys who ask her out, as she believes that having a proper relationship is too bothersome. Following that, Tsukihi then grabs a pair of scissors and cuts out Nadeko's bangs, claiming that she is doing her a favour. Later at school, Nadeko's homeroom teacher keeps pressuring her to help him restore the mood along her classmates, but when she tries to ditch him out as usual, she realizes that without her bangs, her face is fully exposed, preventing her from hiding her true feelings and suddenly, she vents out her anger at him for pushing all his work on her and following that, she lashes out at her classmates for refusing to make amends with each other after the charms incident. After school, Kuchinawa reveals that Nadeko's sudden change of behavior is because his presence made her show her true feelings which she usually keeps repressed and claims that he discovered that what he wants Nadeko to seek for him is hidden in Koyomi's house. Nadeko then sneaks there and searches Koyomi's room until she finds a talisman and Kuchinawa, revealing that it is what he was looking for, asks her if she has any wish he could grant her as an act of gratitude. Nadeko then reveals that her wish is to have her feelings for Koyomi become requited, but Koyomi himself steps into the room and asserts that it is not possible.
43	4	"Nadeko Medusa, Part Four"; Transliteration: "Nadeko Medūsa Sono Yon" (Japanese: なでこメドゥーサ 其ノ肆)	Shūji Miyahara	Takashi Kawabata	October 12, 2013
Despite Koyomi's warnings, Nadeko swallows the talisman and revives Kuchinawa after Shinobu berates her for once again playing the victim. The story then shifts forward to Nadeko's confrontation with Koyomi and Shinobu at the abandoned temple and it is revealed that she defeated both. Kuchinawa then reveals that he had met Nadeko when she swallowed the talisman and all their previous interactions were fruit of Nadeko's own imagination. It is also revealed that Gaen Izuko had entrusted Koyomi with the talisman, that it was Ougi who had filled Nadeko about the talisman's location and that all her movements since then were a ploy to infiltrate into Koyomi's house and secure a key to break into there in secret. As Nadeko is about to kill Koyomi, she answers a call from Hitagi at his phone. Hitagi then reveals that Nadeko must kill her, Shinobu and Koyomi in this order or she may end up being killed by either Hitagi or Shinobu, and in exchange for this information, Nadeko agrees to return to kill them all at the day of their graduation. Six months later, the day of graduation is at hand, and Nadeko waits at the polar snake shrine for Koyomi, Hitagi and Shinobu who, accompanied by Suruga and Tsubasa, appear to confront her.

=== Onimonogatari ===
Onimonogatari was directed by Yuki Yase and Tomoyuki Itamura under the chief direction of Akiyuki Shinbo at Shaft, has animation character designs by Akio Watanabe, and features music composed by Satoru Kōsaki. Watanabe, Shaft animator Nobuhiro Sugiyama, and Taisuke Iwasaki served as chief animation directors; and the season's scripts were written by Muneo Nakamoto of Write Works under the supervision of Shinbo and Shaft.

The season features two pieces of theme music: one opening theme, and one ending theme. "Sono Koe o Oboeteru" (その声を覚えてる; lit. "Remembering Your Voice"), from Otorimonogatari, was again used as the ending theme. The opening theme, "white lies", was composed by Mito and written by Meg Rock. This season features one of three instances in which a member of the female cast did not sing the opening theme, all instances being Shinobu Oshino's voice actress Maaya Sakamoto.

Type	Director
Opening	Takayuki Aizu; Hajime Ueda
Ending	Yukihiro Miyamoto; Takayuki Aizu; Hajime Ueda; Naoaki Shibuta (Note: Credited only for Shinobu Time Parts 1-3.)

No. overall	No. in season	Title	Directed by	Storyboard artist	Original release date
44	1	"Shinobu Time, Part One"; Transliteration: "Shinobu Taimu Sono Ichi" (Japanese: しのぶタイム 其ノ壹)	Naoyuki Tatsuwa	Fumie Muroi	October 26, 2013
After returning from his trip through time, Koyomi comes back home and meets Mayoi, finally returning her backpack. They suddenly come across a mysterious being that starts chasing them down. The two manage to escape when they meet Yotsugi who flies away with them to safety. After stealing a kiss from Koyomi to repay for her help, Yotsugi flees, leaving Koyomi at the mercy of a furious Shinobu that appears soon after and to calm her down, Koyomi kisses her too. With Mayoi still unconscious from their predicament, Koyomi inquires Shinobu about the "darkness" entity they saw and she claims that she had seen it before during a trip to Japan 400 years before. She also claims that it will cause the destruction of the entire city if nothing is done about it.
45	2	"Shinobu Time, Part Two"; Transliteration: "Shinobu Taimu Sono Ni" (Japanese: しのぶタイム 其ノ貳)	Chika Nagaoka	Hiroko Kazui	November 2, 2013
Shinobu reveals that during her first visit to Japan, 400 years ago, she saved the local people from a severe drought by accident and was revered as a goddess by them. She then spent the next years living as a goddess in Japan until all the villagers started disappearing mysteriously, until only Shinobu and a demon hunter she befriended remained. Soon after, the same being that Koyomi met attacked them and Shinobu barely escaped alive, taking with her the demon hunter's hand by accident, which she used to revive him as a servant of hers just like Koyomi. However, the man blamed her for all that happened and unable to reason with him, Shinobu watched him committing suicide by exposing himself to the sunlight. Since then Shinobu never returned to Japan until six months ago, when she and Koyomi first met.
46	3	"Shinobu Time, Part Three"; Transliteration: "Shinobu Taimu Sono San" (Japanese: しのぶタイム 其ノ參)	Eiichi Kuboyama	Yuki Yase	November 9, 2013
After Shinobu tells Koyomi her story, they realize that Yotsugi was overhearing their entire conversation and after Mayoi awakens, they start discussing ways to deal with the darkness being before it appears before them. Koyomi, Mayoi and Yotsugi manage to escape again, but Koyomi is knocked out cold by the shock of Yotsugi's jumping just to awaken several hours later and learn that they unwillingly left Shinobu behind. As Koyomi's vampire powers had not disappeared yet, they conclude that Shinobu is still alive but with Koyomi's powers weakening, it means that they have to find her before she is killed for good. Having no clue about what to do, they decide to contact Izuko Gaen who might provide some advice and when they decide to take shelter in a house, Izuko herself opens the door for them, much to their surprise.
47	4	"Shinobu Time, Part Four"; Transliteration: "Shinobu Taimu Sono Yon" (Japanese: しのぶタイム 其ノ肆)	Yuki Yase	Takashi Kawabata	November 16, 2013
In exchange for her help, Gaen requests three tasks from Koyomi, all being connected to Suruga Kanbaru, formerly known as Suruga Gaen. Izuko reveals herself as her aunt, but she doesn't want to be introduced to her as one to spare Suruga's feelings. When Koyomi accepts, she shows the darkness' true motive—it is a manifestation of the natural order, and means to destroy apparitions not behaving as they should—in this case, not Shinobu, but Mayoi. She exposes Mayoi as a "ghost of a ghost", who should have passed on on Mother's Day, when she finally found her way home; she also stopped leading people astray, neglecting her duty as a lost cow. Gaen leaves to allow Koyomi and Mayoi to process this, and Mayoi realizes she has to pass on, rather than be eaten by the darkness. Bidding Koyomi farewell, she kisses him and confesses her love for him before vanishing. Four months later, Koyomi tells the story of the incident to only one person—Ougi Oshino. On his way home, he realizes he never told Mayoi one thing he should have said—goodbye.

=== Koimonogatari ===
Koimonogatari was directed by Tomoyuki Itamura under the chief direction of Akiyuki Shinbo at Shaft, has animation character designs by Akio Watanabe, and features music composed by Satoru Kōsaki. Watanabe, Shaft animator Nobuhiro Sugiyama, and Taisuke Iwasaki served as chief animation directors; and the season's scripts were written by Yukito Kizawa (episodes 1–3, 5–6) and Muneo Nakamoto (episode 4) of Write Works under the supervision of Shinbo and Shaft.

The season features three pieces of theme music: two opening themes, and one ending theme. "snowdrop", the ending theme, was written by Meg Rock, composed by Hidekazu Tanaka, and sung by Marina Kawano and Luna Haruna. The opening theme for the first three episodes, "fast love", was composed by Satoru Kōsaki, written by Meg Rock, and sung by cast member Chiwa Saitō (Hitagi Senjougahara). An alternate version of "fast love", "Kogarashi Sentiment" (木枯らしセンティメント; lit. "Cold Wintry Wind Sentiment") has additional vocals by cast member Shin-ichiro Miki (Deishuu Kaiki), and was used in the last three episodes. It is the first instance in which a male cast member sang an opening.

The arc's opening is unique in that it features Osamu Kamijou acting as a character designer, and is the one of two instances in the franchise to feature another character designer besides Akio Watanabe (the other being the Kizumonogatari trilogy). The opening was also produced with assistance from Point Pictures.

Type	Director	Storyboard artist	Animation director
Opening	Yukio Takatsu	Yukio Takatsu	Yukio Takatsu; Osamu Kamijou
Ending	Yukihiro Miyamoto; Takayuki Aizu; Hajime Ueda	—N/a	—N/a

No. overall	No. in season	Title	Directed by	Storyboard artist	Original release date
48	1	"Hitagi End, Part One"; Transliteration: "Hitagi Endo Sono Ichi" (Japanese: ひたぎエンド 其ノ壹)	Kenjirou Okada	Hiroko Kazui	November 23, 2013
On New Year's Day, Kaiki receives a call from Hitagi requesting his services as a con man. After claiming that he is in Okinawa in an attempt to shake her off, Hitagi affirms that she will take a flight to meet him there, forcing him to do the same to keep his lie from being exposed and Hitagi from killing him. Once meeting at the airport, Hitagi explains her predicament with Nadeko: Hitagi wants Kaiki to trick Nadeko into abandoning her plans to kill Hitagi and Koyomi on their graduation day. With Oshino nowhere to be found despite Tsubasa's attempts to track him down overseas, she has no other option than asking for his assistance. Despite seeing how Hitagi is desperate enough to resort to asking a man she loathes and that she is prepared to attend whatever demand he asks, Kaiki claims that he has no reason to help them at all. After considering the situation for some time, however, he acquiesces after considering their connection with Gaen's niece Suruga.
49	2	"Hitagi End, Part Two"; Transliteration: "Hitagi Endo Sono Ni" (Japanese: ひたぎエンド 其ノ貳)	Sumito Sasaki	Fumie Muroi	November 30, 2013
Kaiki decides to help Hitagi for a mere ¥100,000, much to her surprise. They leave Okinawa on separate flights to not arouse any suspicion. Posing as the father of one of Nadeko's classmates, Kaiki infiltrates her home to search for any clues. Kaiki discovers several suspicious details, such as the fact that Nadeko had only photos of herself without any friends and that her parents, apparently not curious as to the cause of her disappearance, never opened Nadeko's closet as she requested. Kaiki determines that she was a very spoiled child. After a brief phone conversation with Hitagi, Kaiki decides to visit the Polar Snake Shrine to learn more about Nadeko. Immediately upon Kaiki making a donation at the shrine, a mysteriously cheerful Nadeko appears. Apparently, Kaiki is her first visitor, despite Nadeko's best efforts at renovating the shrine. Kaiki asks her several questions about her relationship with Koyomi, confirming her twisted conception of unrequited love and that she still means to kill Koyomi and Hitagi. Kaiki takes his leave after giving Nadeko some yarn for cat's cradle to occupy her time, promising to return before she perfects any patterns.
50	3	"Hitagi End, Part Three"; Transliteration: "Hitagi Endo Sono San" (Japanese: ひたぎエンド 其ノ參)	Naoyuki Tatsuwa	Hiroshi Aoyama	December 7, 2013
Returning from his visit at the Polar Snake Shrine, Kaiki asks Hitagi to meet him again, ending up in a Mister Donut restaurant. Kaiki claims that it will be easy for him to deceive Nadeko as at her current condition, she can't doubt anyone - she has turned even more childish than she was in her human state, unable to detect any ill will. He reveals his plan to spare Koyomi and the others by lying to her that they died in an accident, thus he needs Hitagi to convince Koyomi to cease all connections with Nadeko. Hitagi, relieved and crying, thanks him for his services. On the following day, Kaiki is approached by Yotsugi who comes with an ultimatum from Gaen urging him to pull off his scheme to deceive Nadeko, claiming that the stake is too high and the entire city may be destroyed should he fail. According to Yotsugi, Gaen originally intended to install Shinobu as a god as part of her plan to straighten out the town, but someone intervened, resulting in the current situation, which Gaen still deems acceptable. Despite accepting ¥3,000,000 as compensation from Gaen, Kaiki moves on with his plan and pays another visit to Nadeko, claiming that he has a special wish she can fulfill and he will keep visiting her in a 100 visit cycle. Nadeko cheerfully tells him that she destroyed the cat's cradle yarn and used a white snake instead. Terrified, he determines she is not only an idiot, but also insane. After the meetup, Kaiki tricks Nadeko's parents to have them leave their house and he takes the opportunity to investigate her room, getting startled upon finding out what she kept hidden inside her closet.
51	4	"Hitagi End, Part Four"; Transliteration: "Hitagi Endo Sono Yon" (Japanese: ひたぎエンド 其ノ肆)	Yukihiro Miyamoto	Kazunori Mizuno	December 14, 2013
Kaiki returns to his hotelroom and finds an envelope with an anonymous message telling him to pull off. After tearing it up and flushing it in the toilet, he contacts Hitagi, telling her about the incident with Gaen and Yotsugi. He asks her if anyone else could profit from having him stop his plans to deceive Nadeko, however she has no idea who could have such goals. She asked if she could see the message, but Kaiki noted that he destroyed it already. Before hanging up, Hitagi warns him to beware of Nadeko. On the following day, Kaiki pays another visit to Nadeko just as promised, but this time he offers ¥20,000 and a bottle of sake instead of the usual ¥10,000, much to Nadeko's joy. Returning from the temple, Kaiki is approached by Hanekawa who wants to talk to him. As they return to the city on a cab, Hanekawa reveals that she had just returned from her search for Oshino overseas without Hitagi's and Araragi's knowledge and even though she knew that continuing to look for him is futile, she intends to depart again on the following day. It turned out that Gaen personally warned Hanekawa to stay out of the intrigue. She invites Kaiki to her hotel room. Kaiki, after making sure she is on their side, suggests her to exchange information with him.
52	5	"Hitagi End, Part Five"; Transliteration: "Hitagi Endo Sono Go" (Japanese: ひたぎエンド 其ノ伍)	Eiichi Kuboyama	Mamoru Kurosawa	December 21, 2013
Kaiki learns from Tsubasa that strange phenomena have been happening in the town even before Shinobu arrived and because of that, Gaen was intending to have her become the new god of the Polar Shrine. However, because of Koyomi's interference, her plans have failed and Nadeko turned into a god instead. Tsubasa believes that Nadeko actually does not care about anything or anybody at all, and most likely doesn't really love "Big Brother Koyomi", thus the reason for her behavior. She is also worried if Kaiki is able to pull off the scam. On the occasion, Tsubasa asks Kaiki if Oshino has any relatives like a niece and he affirms that just like him, Oshino does not have a family at all, including siblings or such, making the existence of Ougi Oshino very suspicious. Through the following days, Kaiki keeps visiting Nadeko to play with her and bring her presents. After having a final conversation with Hitagi by phone, during which she demands him to never set foot in the city again once the job is done, Kaiki has a short meeting with Yotsugi on the way to the shrine. She repeats her warning and claims Kaiki won't be able to deceive Nadeko. On the occasion, it is revealed that Kaiki used his wits to bring down a cult that was deceiving Hitagi's mother but that ultimately led her to join another cult instead and for Hitagi's sake, he had her mother divorce and leave her family. Upon meeting Nadeko at the shrine, Kaiki attempts to deceive her as planned by claiming that Koyomi, Hitagi and Shinobu were killed in a traffic accident in the previous night, however, she instantly recognizes the lie.
53	6	"Hitagi End, Part Six"; Transliteration: "Hitagi Endo Sono Roku" (Japanese: ひたぎエンド 其ノ陸)	Kenjirou Okada	Tomoya Takahashi	December 28, 2013
Kaiki realizes that he failed to deceive Nadeko because she never trusted him at all, and because she was previously deceived by Ougi into claiming the charm and becoming a god. Nadeko unleashes a swarm of snakes onto the entire Polar Snake Shrine, immobilizing Kaiki. Believing that he was sent by Koyomi, she contemplates killing his sisters, Kanbaru, Hanekawa and Mayoi as well to punish him, until Kaiki reveals that he found out her secret aspiration to become a manga artist, as many drawings were hidden in her private closet. Embarrassed for having her secret revealed, Nadeko starts punching and kicking Kaiki as he tries to persuade her. He claims that eventually her parents will open the closet as well and find out about her secret, unless she renounces her godhood and returns home. After convincing her that she should forget about Koyomi entirely and pursue her true ambitions instead, she agrees to get deceived again. Kaiki implants a fake slug apparition into her body to have her unconscious during the exorcism, but he's interrupted by Koyomi rushing into the shrine. Claiming that he was sent by Gaen as a professional to deal with Nadeko, Kaiki extracts the snake charm from her body and returns it to him. Kaiki also instructs Koyomi to cut all connections with Nadeko for her sake, as she must move on with her life by herself - his relationship and romance with her would only make her a useless human being. After calling Hitagi and confirming that his job is done, Kaiki bids farewell to her and realizes that the secret message at his hotel was sent by no other than Hitagi herself, as she knew it would have him push further with his job instead of discouraging him, and Gaen's message to him probably was for the same purpose. As he leaves the city, Kaiki is ambushed and mortally wounded by one of the middle schoolers he formerly deceived, with it being none other than the one who cursed Nadeko. Before he passes out, he hears Ougi's name, implying that he was sent by her. As Kaiki is losing consciousness, the middle schooler attacks him once again.

=== Hanamonogatari ===
Hanamonogatari was directed by Tomoyuki Itamura under the chief direction of Akiyuki Shinbo at Shaft, has animation character designs by Akio Watanabe, and features music composed by Kei Haneoka. Watanabe and Taisuke Iwasaki served as the season's chief animation directors; and the season's scripts were written by Yukito Kizawa (episode 1) and Muneo Nakamoto (episodes 2–5) of Write Works under the supervision of Shinbo and Shaft.

The season features two pieces of theme music: one opening theme, and one ending theme. "the last day of my adolescence", the opening theme, was composed by Mito, written by Meg Rock, and sung by cast member Miyuki Sawashiro (Suruga Kanbaru). The ending theme, "Hana Ato -shirushi-" (花痕 -shirushi-; lit. "Flower Marks -mark-"), was composed by Katsuhiko Kurosu, written by Saori Kodama, and sung by Marina Kawano.

Type	Director	Storyboard artist	Animation director
Opening	Toshimasa Suzuki	Toshimasa Suzuki	Akio Watanabe; Taisuke Iwasaki
Ending	Takayuki Aizu; Hajime Ueda	—N/a	—N/a

No. overall	No. in season	Title	Directed by	Storyboard artist	Original release date
54	1	"Suruga Devil, Part One"; Transliteration: "Suruga Debiru Sono Ichi" (Japanese: するがデビル 其ノ壹)	Kenjirou Okada	Hiroko Kazui	August 16, 2014
Set after the graduation of Koyomi Araragi and Hitagi Senjougahara, Suruga Kanbaru begins her third year in high school. She continues to deal with her left hand that had been turned monstrous through the use of her mother's monkey paw charm. After hearing rumors from Ougi - who is male now - of a "Devil" that can solve one's problems, Suruga sets out to find this person. She secretly fears that this person is her. However, she soon discovers that the "Devil" is her former basketball rival from junior high, Rouka Numachi. Rouka explains that she took on the role of the "Devil" after a leg injury ended her basketball career three years prior. She continues by saying that her work as the "Devil" is merely free counseling. Suruga counters by arguing that her clients are under the impression that the "Devil" is able to magically solve their problems. In essence, she's lying to these people. Rouka explains that in assuring her clients that she will solve their problems, she frees them from worrying about them. The problems themselves are trivial, and get resolved on their own with time. She even says that if a person comes to her with a truly serious matter, she'll refer them an appropriate institution, such as the police. Rouka explains that her position as the "Devil" allows her to be a collector of other people's misfortunes, something she finds joy in. Suruga doesn't agree with the dishonesty or her reasons, but she concedes that as long as Rouka isn't hurting anyone, she won't stop her. She is secretly relieved that she isn't the "Devil". Suruga awakes the next morning to find that her left arm has returned to normal.
55	2	"Suruga Devil, Part Two"; Transliteration: "Suruga Debiru Sono Ni" (Japanese: するがデビル 其ノ貳)	Yukihiro Miyamoto	Mamoru Kurosawa	August 16, 2014
With her hand restored, Suruga attempts to adjust to this change, and how it impacts her daily life. She has many questions for the "Devil" who cured her, but she is informed by Ougi that the "Devil" has vanished, and is no longer giving counsel to others. Suruga attempts to locate the whereabouts of Rouka, but no one seems to know where she is or what she's doing. In an attempt to find some answers, she boards a train to another town. When she arrives, she is met by none other than Deishu Kaiki. She attempts to flee, but Kaiki easily outruns her. Knowing when she's beaten, Suruga agrees to accompany him. Kaiki takes her to a yakiniku restaurant, and explains his motivations. Kaiki was in love with Suruga's mother during his college days. Fate kept them separated, and it was Suruga's mother's wish that if she were to die, Kaiki would look after Suruga. Suruga is skeptical of his 'good will' toward her because of her devotion to Kaiki's nemesis, Hitagi. Kaiki reassures her that he will not deceive her. In the end, she accepts his offer. Kaiki then reveals that he knew about Suruga's monkey paw, and that a person interested in collecting items like that would visit her soon. He implores her to let the collector have it, as the monkey paw is dangerous. Suruga then asks him how he knew she would be at the train station earlier. He says that Rouka told him.
56	3	"Suruga Devil, Part Three"; Transliteration: "Suruga Debiru Sono San" (Japanese: するがデビル 其ノ參)	Tomoyuki Itamura	Eiichi Kuboyama	August 16, 2014
Suruga confronts Rouka, who confirms that she is the collector of devil parts. The two play a bit of one-on-one basketball. Contrary to her appearance as an injured cripple, Rouka is more than a match for Suruga. Rouka and Suruga then recount their stories. Suruga tells the story of the times she used the monkey's paw, and how Koyomi and Hitagi helped her. Rouka, in turn, reveals that she not only has Suruga's monkey paw, but a monkey's leg as well. She explains that after her injury, a friend visiting her in the hospital confided in her about a personal issue. Hearing another person's problems cheered Rouka up, and so she began collecting the misfortunes of others as the "Devil".
57	4	"Suruga Devil, Part Four"; Transliteration: "Suruga Debiru Sono Yon" (Japanese: するがデビル 其ノ肆)	Kenjirou Okada	Kenjirou Okada	August 16, 2014
Rouka continues her explanation from the previous episode, recalling how she came to know Kaiki. As Kaiki is a con artist, and Rouka a collector, their methodologies are similar in how they attract their clients. They butted heads at one point, and resolved to simply pass information between them, and not interfere with the other. Finally she reveals why she came to collect devil parts. A person came to her with a problem, and like usual Rouka planned to listen. The girl revealed that she had a monkey leg, and her wish caused her to attack her own mother, similar to Suruga's wish on her paw. For the first time, Rouka actually wanted to help someone, but as nothing more than a collector of misfortune, she was unable to do anything beyond embracing the girl and telling her it would be alright. Rouka then thinks to contact Kaiki, but discovers the next morning that she now had the monkey leg. It replaced her injured leg. This begins Rouka's collection of devil parts, which she sees as opponents to her hobby as a collector of misfortune. With everything explained, Rouka leaves Suruga, expecting to not see her again. At home, Suruga is still adjusting to her arm being normal. She receives news from Karen Araragi on the current status of Rouka. Apparently Rouka committed suicide over three years prior, meaning the Rouka she had talked to was a ghost the whole time. To clear her head, Suruga decides to go for a run. She runs hard and collapses from exhaustion in the middle of the road. A car drives up to her, and as Suruga attempts to get out of the way, the driver reveals himself to be Koyomi. Koyomi elects to drive Suruga back into town. Along the way, Suruga vaguely confides in Koyomi, telling him of how in their own ways, Rouka, Kaiki, and even her own mother had told her to stay out of this issue, and that time would make things okay in the end. As a man of action, Koyomi rejects this, and encourages Suruga to face her problems if she wants them to be solved. Suruga, emboldened by Koyomi's words, agrees.
58	5	"Suruga Devil, Part Five"; Transliteration: "Suruga Debiru Sono Go" (Japanese: するがデビル 其ノ伍)	Tomoyuki Itamura	Tomoyuki Itamura	August 16, 2014
Upon returning home, Suruga finds a package left to her by Kaiki. It is a mummified monkey's head. Now armed with the proper leverage and conviction, Suruga calls out Rouka for a basketball rematch. Using the head as bait, Suruga challenges Rouka for control of the devil parts. When asked for a reason, initially Suruga says that she fears what Rouka would become if she were to gather all the devil parts, but she later admits that it is because she despises Rouka. Rouka warns her that because the stakes are so high, she'll make full use of her devil parts, including her hand and leg, giving her an advantage. Suruga proposes that they play only a single round, with the two of them utilizing their strongest areas of play. Suruga is an offensive powerhouse, and Rouka is a defensive specialist. If Suruga is able to make a basket, she wins. If not, Rouka wins. After a bit of probing, Rouka reveals that she has no idea that she committed suicide, and is now a ghost, shocking Suruga. Suruga realizes that she's also going to be fighting to make Rouka realize that she's dead. And in doing so she'll confirm that she and Rouka are in fact, different people. Suruga begins her match with Rouka. From the start, she realizes that she won't be able to get around Rouka's defense. But in a moment of quick thinking, Suruga passes the ball to Rouka. As Rouka tenses up in shock over the unexpected move, Suruga swiftly steals the ball from Rouka's hands and gets around her. Suruga goes for a dunk, but Rouka challenges her at the top of her jump. The dunk goes in. In the aftermath, the two share a laugh over the match. Rouka reveals that due to her play style and her personality, her teammates never passed her the ball very often, which is why it surprised her when her opponent did it. Basking in defeat, Rouka encourages Suruga to go back to playing basketball, or at least do something with her talents instead of just watching from the sidelines. As Suruga is about to respond, she looks down to find that Rouka has disappeared, gone to the afterlife. In her place she left behind all of the devil parts that she had collected. Suruga gathers the parts, and finally admits that the whole time she had been jealous of Rouka. The next day Suruga awakes to find Koyomi, who is there to help her clean her room. She asks Koyomi to have Shinobu dispose of the mummified monkey parts. The two discuss the previous day's events, and talk more on what it means for her as a person. Finally, Koyomi gives Suruga a haircut, one that is more suited for playing sports.

=== Tsukimonogatari ===
Tsukimonogatari was directed by Tomoyuki Itamura under the chief direction of Akiyuki Shinbo at Shaft, has animation character designs by Akio Watanabe, and features music composed by Kei Haneoka. Watanabe and Taisuke Iwasaki served as the season's chief animation directors; and the season's scripts were written by Yukito Kizawa (episodes 1–2) and Muneo Nakamoto (episodes 3–4) of Write Works under the supervision of Shinbo and Shaft.

The season features two pieces of theme music: one opening theme, and one ending theme. "border", the ending theme, was composed by Ryōsuke Shigenaga, written by Meg Rock, and performed by ClariS. The opening theme, "Orange Mint" (オレンジミント), was composed by Mito, written by Meg Rock, and sung by cast member Saori Hayami (Yotsugi Ononoki). The opening animation was again produced with assistance from Point Pictures.

Type	Director	Storyboard artist	Animation director
Opening	Yukio Takatsu	Yukio Takatsu	Yukio Takatsu
Ending	Takayuki Aizu; Hajime Ueda	—N/a	—N/a

No. overall	No. in season	Title	Directed by	Storyboard artist	Original release date
59	1	"Yotsugi Doll, Part One"; Transliteration: "Yotsugi Dōru Sono Ichi" (Japanese: よつぎドール 其ノ壹)	Yukihiro Miyamoto	Mamoru Kurosawa	December 31, 2014
The arc opens with Koyomi Araragi and Shinobu Oshino musing about the true nature of Shikigami doll Yotsugi Ononoki. Koyomi supposes that as an apparition, Yotsugi isn't well suited to life among humans, in spite of her attempts at being human-like. She was, after all, created from a human corpse, by other humans. Shinobu disputes this, saying that the human parts of Yotsugi's nature are because she needs to interact with humans, rather than a desire of hers to become human. Koyomi goes on to consider the nature of apparitions in general, concluding that apparitions are the way they are because people believe them to be so. Koyomi's monologue concludes by foreshadowing that this arc is the beginning of the end of the series. The story begins with Koyomi being woken up by his sisters, Karen and Tsukihi Araragi. Koyomi realizes that the next day is Valentine's Day, but Karen exclaims that he doesn't have the time to worry about that, as his college entrance exams are coming up soon. Karen leaves to go on a run, instructing Koyomi to prepare a bath for her. After Karen leaves, Koyomi and Tsukihi discuss why Karen hasn't joined any athletic teams. Koyomi states that Karen is a talented individual, and that by committing herself to just karate, and her half of the Fire Sisters, she is letting her talent go to waste. While Tsukihi is annoyed that Koyomi would suggest breaking up the duo, she admits that she realizes that Karen will leave on her own, to do her own thing. Koyomi recognizes the need for his sisters to wake up and be more mature about how they conduct themselves. After preparing the bath for Karen, Koyomi decides to use it for himself. He is caught by Tsukihi, who also plans on using the bath. The two briefly argue over who should get to go first, before compromising. The two bathe together. Tsukihi mentions that Nadeko Sengoku was recently released from the hospital after her ordeal as a snake god. Koyomi responds neutrally. While he is happy that Nadeko turned out okay, he knows that it's for the best if he stays out of her life. Moreover, Koyomi realizes that without a god, the shrine area will continue to accumulate dark spiritual energy, which in turn will cause more apparition problems for his town. He resolves to do his best to put things in balance before leaving for college. Tsukihi is concerned with how much pressure and responsibility Koyomi holds for himself, telling him that he shouldn't worry so much. Koyomi then realizes that his own reflection isn't showing up in the bathroom mirror. As if he had become a real vampire.
60	2	"Yotsugi Doll, Part Two"; Transliteration: "Yotsugi Dōru Sono Ni" (Japanese: よつぎドール 其ノ貳)	Kenjirou Okada	Masahiro Sekino	December 31, 2014
Koyomi narrowly avoids letting Tsukihi see that he has no reflection. The pair are then caught by Karen, who proceeds to beat them up. Later, Koyomi explains his discovery to Shinobu. Shinobu concludes that Koyomi has indeed turned into a vampire. Koyomi protests, pointing out an injury to his toe that had been inflicted by Tsukihi earlier. It hadn't healed, which it should have if he were a true vampire. Shinobu corrects him, saying that while it hadn't healed much on the surface, the toe actually had been broken, and it was the bone that had been healing. Shinobu suggests that Koyomi see a specialist, Yozuru Kagenui. Koyomi agrees, but doesn't know how to contact her, or Yotsugi. Shinobu then suggests contacting Kaiki, and using him to get through to Yozuru, but Koyomi refuses on account of his past grievances with Kaiki. Shinobu finally suggests Izuko Gaen. Both she and Koyomi have reservations about getting involved with her, but they agree that their options are limited. As Koyomi picks up his phone to contact Izuko, he sees that she has already messaged him. She tells him to go to an arcade at a certain time that night. Tsukihi then storms into Koyomi's room and berates him for leaving her to deal with Karen by herself. She demands that he apologize. Koyomi instead instructs Tsukihi to convince Karen that the two of them should sleep over at Suruga Kanbaru's house that night. He reasons that if he's going to be involved with Yozuru and Yotsugi, Tsukihi might be in danger, as she is still an immortal phoenix. Tsukihi reluctantly agrees. That night, Koyomi and Shinobu go to the arcade, where they find Yotsugi as a motionless doll inside of a claw machine. She is unresponsive, resulting in Koyomi having to play the game in order to get her out. It takes him twelve tries. After claiming Yotsugi, Yozuru appears, and the group discusses Koyomi's situation at the ruins of the abandoned cram school. Yozuru examines Koyomi's toe, and shows him that it is completely healed. Koyomi is surprised, as it healed much faster than it had been earlier. Yotsugi points out what time it is, and Koyomi remembers that a vampire's powers are stronger at night. She also mentions that vampires are healed by moonlight. As Yotsugi analyzes Koyomi's foot, Yozuru runs another test on Koyomi, breaking two of his fingers. Koyomi is stunned, but Yozuru explains that vampires are able to consciously heal their injuries if they concentrate on them. Through some effort, Koyomi heals his fingers. With the tests done and analysis complete, Yozuru and Yotsugi reveal their results. Yotsugi explains that currently, Koyomi is slowly turning into a vampire. Koyomi is unfazed, stating that due to his encounters with other apparitions, he has turned into a vampire many times before, albeit on a temporary basis. Yotsugi then explains that it is because he turned into a vampire so much that he is now becoming a vampire. Or rather, he became accustomed to being a vampire, which is why his soul is starting to lean in that direction. Yozuru says that while this sort of thing isn't unheard of, Meme Oshino couldn't have predicted it was going to happen. Yotsugi goes on to explain that an aggravating factor was the incident with Sengoku and the snake god. During the intervening time when Sengoku was lording over the shrine, Koyomi used his powers as a vampire every day in an effort to save her. Koyomi accepts the situation, and asks for what he should to do to undo the progress of his transformation. Yotsugi replies that there is no way to fix it.
61	3	"Yotsugi Doll, Part Three"; Transliteration: "Yotsugi Dōru Sono San" (Japanese: よつぎドール 其ノ參)	Kazuki Ōhashi	Eiichi Kuboyama	December 31, 2014
As Yotsugi's words sink in, Koyomi remains unfazed. He reasons that his experiences as a vampire must have come with a price. One that he should have to pay. Yozuru commends Koyomi for his acceptance, but tells him that while there is no way to undo the progress of his transformation, there is a way he can stop it from progressing further: he must no longer use his powers as a vampire. Yotsugi informs Koyomi that he can still use his blood to feed Shinobu, but he shouldn't do it too often, and not to the point where he gains any powers. Yozuru warns him that if he were to progress further toward being a vampire, she would have to kill him, as is her duty as a specialist. This raises Shinobu's ire, and she tells Yozuru that if Koyomi were to die, the restraints on her would be released, returning her to her status as lord of the vampires. She would use that power to kill Yozuru. Yozuru accepts the challenge. Yotsugi, not wanting to see the others fight, urges Koyomi to never use his powers again, in order to keep things the way they are. Reluctantly, Koyomi promises to stop using his powers. Internally, however, he has doubts as to whether or not he can. He knows that if someone he cares about were going to die he wouldn't hesitate to use his powers to save them. Later, as Koyomi and Yozuru are discussing the reasoning behind her focus on killing immortal apparitions, Yozuru receives a call from Izuko. Yozuru tells Koyomi and Yotsugi to go to Suruga's house immediately, to check on his sisters. They arrive to find not only Koyomi's sisters, but also Suruga missing. In their place is a series of paper cranes. Yotsugi explains that the bird shape indicates that the kidnapper is after Tsukihi, the phoenix. They meet back up with Yozuru, who explains that the man behind the kidnapping is Teori Tadatsuru, an apparition specialist and doll master. Like Yozuru, Teori is a specialist who focuses on killing immortal apparitions. Yozuru warns Koyomi that he can't use his powers as a vampire to solve this, nor can Shinobu. Koyomi remarks on the costs of his vampire power usage, likening it to divine punishment. Yotsugi and Yozuru disagree, stating that the kidnapping happening the day Koyomi finds out he transformed into vampire is much too coincidental. Koyomi and Yozuru then discuss possibilities for Teori's motivations, and who he is as a specialist. Yozuru says that Teori doesn't hold much in the way of convictions, only that he finds apparitions to be beautiful. Teori himself is an artist, and as a specialist he goes around like Meme, mediating between apparitions and humans. Yozuru then reveals that Teori's true targets are Koyomi and Shinobu, and as Teori operates outside of Izuko's network of specialists, Meme's assertion that Koyomi and Shinobu are harmless means nothing to Teori. The group then looks through the paper cranes, and finds one with Teori's location: the North Shirahebi Shrine. Yotsugi and Koyomi prepare to jump to a location near the mountain where the shrine is. Yozuru will proceed to the shrine on her own, but she tells Koyomi to do things when he feels it's right, and not to wait for her.
62	4	"Yotsugi Doll, Part Four"; Transliteration: "Yotsugi Dōru Sono Yon" (Japanese: よつぎドール 其ノ肆)	Tomoyuki Itamura	Tomoyuki Itamura; Hiroko Kazui	December 31, 2014
Koyomi and Yotsugi land at the base of the mountain, where they are surprisingly met by Ougi Oshino. She talks with Koyomi for a while about his current situation and his upcoming confrontation with Teori. Koyomi and Yotsugi begin their journey up the mountain. The two discuss how they will be able to rescue Koyomi's sisters and Suruga. Koyomi hopes that they'll be able to sneak past Teori and get them without him noticing, but Yotsugi is doubtful of that plan. She expects that Koyomi will have to convince Teori to let them go, as this is how Koyomi normally deals with his opponents. Yotsugi then briefly explains how she was created. Back during their college days, Yozuru, Teori, Meme, and Deishu Kaiki did a project to create an artificial shikigami from the corpse of a human, under the direction of Izuko. Yozuru and Teori both fought for 'ownership' of Yotsugi, but in the end, Yotsugi chose to stay with Yozuru. This led to a falling out between Yozuru and Teori. Yotsugi discloses that the reason she is telling Koyomi this is because, if things were dire, he could choose to hand over Yotsugi to Teori in order to resolve the situation. Koyomi refuses to consider the option. He instead instructs Yotsugi to find the hostages, and use her power to immediately get away, while he distracts Teori. Yotsugi points out that if she were to leave, Koyomi and Shinobu would be left helpless before Teori. Yotsugi halfheartedly suggests offering Shinobu to Teori, which Koyomi refuses. Yotsugi points out that Koyomi's desire to have the hostages rescued while not being willing to give up either Yotsugi, Shinobu, or himself shows a lack of maturity. She then suggests that if she were to get close enough to Teori, she could use her powers to kill him before he has a chance to react. Koyomi is shocked at the suggestion. He wants to preserve what humanity is left in Yotsugi, and if she were to kill Teori, she would lose it. The two reach the shrine, and observe Teori. He is sitting on the offertory box, folding origami. Koyomi realizes that he is counting time with that: once the box is full of origami, time is up. Koyomi decides to use his simple decoy plan, and Yotsugi leaves to sneak in through the rear of the shrine. As Koyomi is preparing to confront Teori, Shinobu appears from his shadow. She tells him that she doesn't care if he is no longer human, so if Koyomi is about to die, she'll turn him into a full vampire. Koyomi then confronts Teori. Teori reveals that both he and Yozuru have a curse upon them that prevents them from walking on the ground. He then says that his reason for kidnapping those close to Koyomi was so that he could kill Koyomi. However, Teori is perplexed at the situation. He knows that he is there to kill Koyomi, but why him? On paper it seems like Teori is the best person to oppose Koyomi, almost as if he were cast for the role. He can't help but feel that someone else has manipulated events so that it would turn out to be him fighting Koyomi. While this conversation is taking place, Yotsugi is shown searching the shrine for the hostages. Koyomi is angered by Teori's musings on the situation, but Teori points out that Koyomi's anger merely fits the role that he had been cast. The two of them are following their scripts. He tells Koyomi to find Meme, as he is the one who could bring balance outside of the casting or script. Koyomi replies that he has searched, and asks Teori if he knows where Meme is. Teori replies that he does not. Teori drops a final origami into the offertory box, and it fills up. Teori gets ready to fight Koyomi, stating that he's sick of being manipulated and used like a pawn. Teori then appears to be talking to someone other than Koyomi. It is revealed to be Yotsugi, who appears in front of Teori. Yotsugi uses her powers and kills Teori. Koyomi is shocked. Yotsugi reassures him that he had nothing to do with her decision. Even if there were a way to save everyone, she decided to do it because she is a monster, in her own words. She tells Koyomi to not end up like her. Karen, Tsukihi, and Suruga are found in the offertory box, and are taken back to Suruga's house. Taking an external view of things, Koyomi realizes that the point of this incident was to create a rift between him and Yotsugi. He was disgusted by her actions. Later, Koyomi visits Hitagi Senjougahara's house, who surprises him with chocolates. He remembers that today is Valentine's Day. Koyomi and Hitagi discuss the previous day's events and what they mean for his future. Hitagi surmises that things are fine for now, and that worrying too much about the future isn't all that great. He should just focus on living his life. After returning home, Koyomi enters his sister's room and finds Yotsugi sitting on Tsukihi's bed. Yotsugi explains that she was won by Tsukihi in the same claw game that Koyomi played the previous night, though Tsukihi needed only three attempts to get her. She goes on to say that both Yozuru and Izuko realized that the point of the previous day's incident was to create a rift in between Koyomi and Yotsugi, and as such, they should oppose whatever party that is causing these incidents. Therefore, until balance is achieved in the town, Yotsugi will be living in the Araragi household, which will serve to help Koyomi and Yotsugi reconcile.

=== Owarimonogatari I ===
Owarimonogatari I was directed by Tomoyuki Itamura under the chief direction of Akiyuki Shinbo at Shaft, has animation character designs by Akio Watanabe, and features music composed by Kei Haneoka. Watanabe, Taisuke Iwasaki, and Shinya Nishizawa served as the season's chief animation directors; and the season's scripts were written by Yukito Kizawa (episodes 1–2, 4–5, 8–9) and Muneo Nakamoto (episodes 3, 6–7, 10–13) of Write Works under the supervision of Shinbo and Shaft. Episodes 3, 4, 8, and 10 were outsourced to Diomedéa. Opening 2 was also animated with assistance from Point Pictures.

The season features five pieces of theme music: four opening themes, and one ending theme. "Sayonara no Yukue" (さよならのゆくえ, lit. "Whereabouts of Goodbye"), the ending theme, was composed by Alisa Takigawa and Saku, written by Takigawa, and performed by Takigawa. All of the opening themes were composed by Mito and written by Meg Rock, and 3/4 of them feature vocals by members of the cast. The first opening, "decent black", was sung by Kaori Mizuhashi (Ougi Oshino); the second opening, "mathemagics", was sung by Marina Inoue (Sodachi Oikura); the third opening, "Yūritsu Hōteishiki" (夕立方程式), was also sung by Marina Inoue; and the fourth opening, "mein schatz", does not feature any of the cast's vocals.

Type	Arc	Director	Storyboard artist	Animation director
Opening	Ougi Formula	URA; Yukihiro Miyamoto	URA	Taisuke Iwasaki
Opening	Sodachi Riddle	Yukio Takatsu	Yukio Takatsu	Yukio Takatsu
Opening	Sodachi Lost	URA	URA	Shinya Nishizawa
Opening	Shinobu Mail	Hajime Ueda; Takayuki Aizu	—N/a	—N/a
Ending	All arcs	Hajime Ueda; Takayuki Aizu	—N/a	—N/a

No. overall	No. in season	Title	Directed by	Storyboard artist	Original release date
63	1	"Ougi Formula, Part One"; Transliteration: "Ōgi Fōmyura Sono Ichi" (Japanese: おうぎフォーミュラ 其ノ壹)	Tomoyuki Itamura; Kazuki Ōhashi	Tomoyuki Itamura	October 3, 2015 (Note: "Ougi Formula" was a double episode aired in a one-hour special.)
Koyomi and Ougi find themselves trapped in a classroom, and the story shifts back to the point when Suruga introduces Ougi to Koyomi. Ougi approaches him with a mystery about a room not seen in the school's blueprints for them to investigate. When they enter the room, they find themselves trapped inside, leading them to their current situation. While talking about their predicament, the duo realize that the room is an oddity created by a traumatic memory from Koyomi's freshman years. Koyomi then tells Ougi that two years prior, the class president at his and Hitagi's class at the time, Sodachi Oikura, was looking for possible culprits of cheating on a math test, and would not allow any student to leave class until a culprit was found. Ougi surmises that they themselves won't be able to leave the room until the two-year-old mystery is solved.
64	2	"Ougi Formula, Part Two"; Transliteration: "Ōgi Fōmyura Sono Ni" (Japanese: おうぎフォーミュラ 其ノ貳)	Tomoyuki Itamura; Kazuki Ōhashi	Tomoyuki Itamura	October 3, 2015
Koyomi explains that during that debate two years earlier, tension among the students increased until Sodachi proposed a voting to elect the culprit, and while she voted for Koyomi out of her hatred on him, much to her surprise, she herself was chosen by most of the rest of the class. Since then, she stopped coming to school, just appearing to taking the tests while studying at home, while Koyomi stopped trusting people at all, leading to his reclusive life at school until he met Tsubasa, Hitagi and the other girls. Ougi, based on the information she obtained from Koyomi, figures that the true culprit was their math teacher at the time, Tetsujo Komichi, who arranged for her students to glimpse the contents of her test in advance in order to improve their grades and her reputation as a teacher as well, and Koyomi remembers that Tetsujo was one among those who voted Sodachi as the culprit. Now able to leave the room, Koyomi wonders if he was led there by Ougi by purpose, but she denies it. The next day, Koyomi gets himself relieved upon knowing that Tetsujo is on maternity leave and he won't see her again until he graduates. He also looks for the room where he and Ougi were trapped just to find that it is not there anymore, as a sign that the oddity disappeared for good. Just when Koyomi returns to his classroom, Tsubasa appears to stop him from entering, because Sodachi unexpectedly returned to attend classes during Tetsujo's leave, much to his surprise.
65	3	"Sodachi Riddle, Part One"; Transliteration: "Sodachi Ridoru Sono Ichi" (Japanese: そだちリドル 其ノ壹)	Midori Yoshizawa	Mie Ōishi	October 10, 2015
Koyomi arrives at his former middle school, accompanied by Ougi, looking for clues regarding Sodachi's hatred towards him. While investigating his former shoe locker, the pair find three letters, and the story then shifts back to the moment when Koyomi is informed by Tsubasa that Sodachi had returned to the school. In the occasion, Tsubasa reveals that Sodachi had made her all sort of questions regarding him and she answered her the best she could. While Tsubasa leaves to inform the homeroom teacher about Sodachi, Koyomi decides to face her directly. In the occasion, Sodachi continuously insults him, claiming that she not only despises him, but that she does so because he has a happy life and does not know the reason why. When Koyomi attempts to calm her down, she hurts him with a mechanic pencil, just when Hitagi enters the room. Fearing for the worse, Tsubasa attempts to hold Hitagi back to no avail but claims that she will not attack Sodachi for injuring her boyfriend. However, Sodachi starts insulting her as well, and after being slapped in the face, Hitagi knocks her down with a punch, before losing consciousness as well and leaving the situation for Koyomi to resolve. Upon confiding to Ougi about the situation, they conclude that the key to the mystery lies in the middle school where both Koyomi and Sodachi used to study, and because of that they decided to stop there to investigate. Back to the present, the pair find in the letters a map leading to an abandoned house. While exploring the house, Ougi points out that Sodachi must be aware that Tetsujo is the true culprit behind the incident in the classroom two years before, as she decided to return to school just when she left on maternity leave. Despite wary of Ougi's true intentions, Koyomi guides her to the house's attic, where he is about to tell the story of what happened there five years prior.
66	4	"Sodachi Riddle, Part Two"; Transliteration: "Sodachi Ridoru Sono Ni" (Japanese: そだちリドル 其ノ貳)	Kōsuke Hirota	Hiroko Kazui	October 17, 2015
Koyomi tells Ougi that five years before, he was in trouble with his grades at school, specially in mathematics, when he finds three letters in his shoe locker and upon solving the mystery that lies on them, he is drawn to the ruins where he met a girl of his age who agreed to help him with his studies, upon agreeing at three conditions: that he would never ask, or try to figure out her name; that they would only study in the ruins's attic; and that they will only talk about mathematics. Agreeing with her demands, Koyomi studied with the girl for some time, until one day she disappeared without a trace, only leaving behind an empty envelope for him. Certain that the girl from that time could be no other than Sodachi, and by the signs of domestic violence she glimpsed in the house, Ougi realizes that by that time, the house was not in ruins, but was actually the house where Sodachi used to live, and she had actually lured Koyomi there by purpose, knowing that his parents are from the police, hoping that upon realizing that something was wrong with her own parents' behavior, he would tell them, but he did not realize that at the time, which was the reason for the empty envelope she left for him as a sign that he did not help her when she needed him most. In the next day, Koyomi returns to school, knowing that he must face Sodachi once more, but he can't shake the feeling that the reason for her hatred towards him runs deeper than that.
67	5	"Sodachi Lost, Part One"; Transliteration: "Sodachi Rosuto Sono Ichi" (Japanese: そだちロスト 其ノ壹)	Keizō Kusakawa	Shin Wakabayashi	October 24, 2015
Hanekawa reveals her concerns about Ougi as she and Araragi go to visit Oikura.
68	6	"Sodachi Lost, Part Two"; Transliteration: "Sodachi Rosuto Sono Ni" (Japanese: そだちロスト 其ノ貳)	Hajime Ootani	Mie Ōishi	October 31, 2015
Araragi and Hanekawa visit Oikura and learn the painful story of her family's past.
69	7	"Sodachi Lost, Part Three"; Transliteration: "Sodachi Rosuto Sono San" (Japanese: そだちロスト 其ノ參)	Kenjirou Okada	Kei Ajiki	November 7, 2015
Ougi claims to have figured out the whereabouts of Oikura's mother and, in her own way, helps Araragi and Hanekawa to solve the mystery.
70	8	"Shinobu Mail, Part One"; Transliteration: "Shinobu Meiru Sono Ichi" (Japanese: しのぶメイル 其ノ壹)	Tomoyuki Itamura	Hiroko Kazui	November 14, 2015
Koyomi meets Suruga at the abandoned cram school, where they encounter a figure in full samurai armor. A fight that breaks out is soon interrupted as the building bursts into flames. Yotsugi appears suddenly and extinguishes the fire using an explosion.
71	9	"Shinobu Mail, Part Two"; Transliteration: "Shinobu Meiru Sono Ni" (Japanese: しのぶメイル 其ノ貳)	Tomoyuki Itamura; Hidetoshi Namura	Shingo Tamaki	November 21, 2015
After saving Koyomi and Suruga from the cram school, Yotsugi kicks Koyomi leaving a footprint on his face and convinces him to meet up with Izuko Gaen and take Suruga along. Despite a snail curse apparently affecting them, they finally manage to get to the meeting point, where they can't find Gaen but are reunited with Shinobu and find themselves facing a mysterious apparition.
72	10	"Shinobu Mail, Part Three"; Transliteration: "Shinobu Meiru Sono San" (Japanese: しのぶメイル 其ノ參)	Takuma Suzuki	Kazuya Shiotsuki	November 28, 2015
Koyomi, Suruga and Shinobu fight with the mysterious apparition, which seems like a hybrid of all the oddities Koyomi had dealt with in the past. Upon defeating the apparition, the gang meet up at the shrine with Izuko Gaen, who introduces herself as the sister of Meme Oshino, Izuko Oshino. She tells them that the task she asked Koyomi to do was, in fact, related to the enemies they had encountered so far and the main objective was the samurai armor, who she tells them is actually the first minion of Shinobu mentioned in Onimonogatari. She tells them of the tale of the first minion, the original apparition killer, what became of him, and how he came to this town... 15 years ago.
73	11	"Shinobu Mail, Part Four"; Transliteration: "Shinobu Meiru Sono Yon" (Japanese: しのぶメイル 其ノ肆)	Keizō Kusakawa	Mie Ōishi	December 5, 2015
Gaen explains that the return of the first minion's remains to the town 15 years ago caused the shrine, that was built long ago by a specialist to disperse apparition energy accumulating at the location, to collapse. It was at the same time she and her college clubmates created Yotsugi - and apparitions started to appear in town, though Gaen claims those events were still Koyomi's fault, except for Shinobu's arrival in town, who was drawn there unknowingly by the first minion's presence. When the first minion saw Shinobu on her first visit to the shrine a few days ago during the events of Kabukimonogatari, he left the shrine and thus, Yotsugi missed him on her mission to take care of him. Gaen says she has summoned another specialist to help with the first minion and leaves. While Suruga and Shinobu stay behind Koyomi goes shopping for food and books and is surprised by the first minion at the book store, now looking like a boy.
74	12	"Shinobu Mail, Part Five"; Transliteration: "Shinobu Meiru Sono Go" (Japanese: しのぶメイル 其ノ伍)	Sō Toyama	Shin Wakabayashi	December 12, 2015
The first minion says he won't attack Koyomi because, as a specialist, he respects Yotsugi's mark - the footprint she left on his face. He asks Koyomi to break up with Shinobu as he wants to apologize to and team up with her, but Koyomi doubts his intentions. The first minion tricks Koyomi into drinking holy water, circumventing Yotsugi's mark by making Koyomi poison himself, but Episode and Gaen intervene just in time. After challenging Koyomi to a duel, the first minion leaves unhindered by Gaen and Episode. Back at the shrine Koyomi meets Yotsugi and watches Suruga trying to convince a threatening Shinobu to meet with her first minion claiming she should confront her first one and his feelings even if it might end badly. Shinobu retreats into the shrine, pouting, and Koyomi asks Yotsugi to remove the mark. Episode informs him they have prepared his high school's courtyard to serve as dueling grounds.
75	13	"Shinobu Mail, Part Six"; Transliteration: "Shinobu Meiru Sono Roku" (Japanese: しのぶメイル 其ノ陸)	Kenjirou Okada	Hiroko Kazui	December 19, 2015
After talking with Hitagi on the phone, Koyomi arrives at the dueling grounds. He is still separated from Shinobu and the powers their bond grants him, but he wants to prove he can help her on his own. Before the duel starts Koyomi receives the picture message Tsubasa sends him in Tsubasa Tiger and Gaen informs him that Tsubasa's and Hitagi's lifes are currently threatened by the tiger Kako and urges him to forfeit the duel to save them, but Koyomi sends Suruga ahead instead. Koyomi defeats the first minion by pinning the talisman Meme used to disperse apparition energy at the shrine on him. As he dissolves, Shinobu arrives and, crying, tells him that she is glad she is able to see him again, calling him by his name, Seishirou. She eats him, granting him final death. Back in the present, early on the day of Koyomi's college entrance exams, as Koyomi concludes the story with his arrival at the confrontation between Tsubasa and Kako, Ougi asks him if Shinobu ate Seishirou completely, that is including his suit of armor. As Koyomi wonders, Ougi explains it was made of Seishirou's blood and bones and suggests Gaen might use it to forge demon swords from it, another Kokoro Watari and its counterpart Yume Watari, and Episode might even have been summoned just for that purpose. After Ougi left, Koyomi and Yotsugi discuss his inability to strive for a happy end, and then he leaves for the shrine, contemplating.

=== Owarimonogatari II ===
Owarimonogatari II was directed by Tomoyuki Itamura under the chief direction of Akiyuki Shinbo at Shaft, has animation character designs by Akio Watanabe, and features music composed by Kei Haneoka. Watanabe, Taisuke Iwasaki, and Studio Wanpack animator Kana Miyai served as the season's chief animation directors; and the season's scripts were co-written by Yukito Kizawa and Muneo Nakamoto of Write Works under the supervision of Shinbo and Shaft.

The season features four pieces of theme music: three opening themes, and one ending theme. "SHIORI", the ending theme, was composed and written by Tomoyuki Ogawa, and was performed by ClariS. The first opening, "terminal terminal", was composed by Mito and Satoru Kōsaki, written by Meg Rock, and was sung by cast member Emiri Katō (Mayoi Hachikuji); the second opening, "dreamy date drive", was composed by Satoru Kōsaki, written by Meg Rock, and sung by cast member Chiwa Saitō (Hitagi Senjougahara); the third opening, "dark cherry mystery", was composed by Mito, written by Meg Rock, and sung by cast member Kaori Mizuhashi (Ougi Oshino).

Type	Arc	Director	Storyboard artist	Animation director
Opening	Mayoi Hell	Tomotaka Kanda (Note: Video Coordinator (映像コーディネーター))	—N/a	Taisuke Iwasaki
Opening	Hitagi Rendezvous	Tomoyuki Itamura	Tomoyuki Itamura	Taisuke Iwasaki
Opening	Ougi Dark	URA	URA	—N/a
Ending	All arcs	Hajime Ueda; Takayuki Aizu	—N/a	—N/a

No. overall	No. in season	Title	Directed by	Storyboard artist	Original release date
76	14	"Mayoi Hell, Part One"; Transliteration: "Mayoi Heru Sono Ichi" (Japanese: まよいヘル 其ノ壹)	Tomoyuki Itamura	Tomoyuki Itamura	August 12, 2017
After being killed by Gaen, Koyomi is sent to the deepest part of hell, Avīci, for making a contract with a demon, where he meets Mayoi, who appears with a way for him to revive.
77	15	"Mayoi Hell, Part Two"; Transliteration: "Mayoi Heru Sono Ni" (Japanese: まよいヘル 其ノ貳)	Yoshiyuki Kaneko	Tomoyuki Itamura	August 12, 2017
Mayoi takes Koyomi to meet Teori, who offers him a way to return to the world of the living as a human. Koyomi is in doubt about accepting his offer, as he believes others like Mayoi are more worthy of reviving than him, until he comes with a surprising decision.
78	16	"Hitagi Rendezvous, Part One"; Transliteration: "Hitagi Randevū Sono Ichi" (Japanese: ひたぎランデブー 其ノ壹)	Akiko Nakano	Hiroko Kazui; Tomoyuki Itamura	August 12, 2017
Now fully human again, Koyomi is called by Hitagi for a date. As they spend some time together, Koyomi has a vision of Ougi.
79	17	"Hitagi Rendezvous, Part Two"; Transliteration: "Hitagi Randevū Sono Ni" (Japanese: ひたぎランデブー 其ノ貳)	Tomoyuki Itamura	Kei Ajiki	August 12, 2017
Koyomi and Hitagi spend the rest of the date bonding further. Once back home, Koyomi has another encounter with Ougi.
80	18	"Ougi Dark, Part One"; Transliteration: "Ōgi Dāku Sono Ichi" (Japanese: おうぎダーク 其ノ壹)	Takashi Asami	Mie Ōishi	August 13, 2017
Gaen assembles Koyomi, Shinobu, Mayoi and Yotsugi and reveals that Ougi is the responsible for some of the previous ordeals they faced.
81	19	"Ougi Dark, Part Two"; Transliteration: "Ōgi Dāku Sono Ni" (Japanese: おうぎダーク 其ノ貳)	Tetsuya Miyanishi	Tomoko Hiramuki	August 13, 2017
To stop Ougi from meddling further, Koyomi has a final confrontation with her. In the occasion, he realizes that Ougi is an apparition accidentally created by no other than himself.
82	20	"Ougi Dark, Part Three"; Transliteration: "Ōgi Dāku Sono San" (Japanese: おうぎダーク 其ノ參)	Tomoyuki Itamura	Tomoyuki Itamura	August 13, 2017
After being exposed, Ougi is about to be engulfed by the darkness, but Koyomi refuses to give up on her and Meme reappears in the nick of time to save them.

=== Zoku Owarimonogatari ===
Zoku Owarimonogatari was directed by Akiyuki Shinbo at Shaft, has animation character designs by Akio Watanabe, and features music composed by Kei Haneoka. Watanabe, Shinya Nishizawa, and Kana Miyai (now freelance after the dissolution of Studio Wanpack) served as the season's chief animation directors; and the season's scripts were written by Yukito Kizawa of Write Works under the supervision of Shinbo and Shaft. It was originally released as a film to Japanese theaters on November 10, 2018.

The season features two pieces of theme music: one opening theme, and one ending theme. "azure", the ending theme, was composed by Kōdai Akiba, written by Kei Hayashi, and performed by TrySail. The opening, "07734", was composed by Satoru Kōsaki and Mito, was written by Meg Rock, and features lines read by cast member Hiroshi Kamiya (Koyomi Araragi).

Type	Director
Opening	Hajime Ueda; Takayuki Aizu
Ending	Hajime Ueda; Takayuki Aizu

No. overall	No. in season	Title	Directed by	Storyboard artist	Original release date
98	1	"Koyomi Reverse, Part One"; Transliteration: "Koyomi Ribaasu Sono Ichi" (Japanese: こよみリバース 其ノ壹)	Midori Yoshizawa	Midori Yoshizawa	May 18, 2019
99	2	"Koyomi Reverse, Part Two"; Transliteration: "Koyomi Ribaasu Sono Ni" (Japanese: こよみリバース 其ノ貳)	Yutaka Kawasaki	Mie Ōishi	May 25, 2019
100	3	"Koyomi Reverse, Part Three"; Transliteration: "Koyomi Ribaasu Sono San" (Japanese: こよみリバース 其ノ參)	Kenjirou Okada	Kenjirou Okada	June 1, 2019
101	4	"Koyomi Reverse, Part Four"; Transliteration: "Koyomi Ribaasu Sono Yon" (Japanese: こよみリバース 其ノ肆)	Takashi Asami	Kei Ajiki	June 8, 2019
102	5	"Koyomi Reverse, Part Five"; Transliteration: "Koyomi Ribaasu Sono Go" (Japanese: こよみリバース 其ノ伍)	Midori Yoshizawa	Mie Ōishi	June 15, 2019
103	6	"Koyomi Reverse, Part Six"; Transliteration: "Koyomi Ribaasu Sono Roku" (Japanese: こよみリバース 其ノ陸)	Hajime Ootani	Hajime Ootani	June 22, 2019

== Film series ==
=== Kizumonogatari ===
The Kizumonogatari trilogy was directed by Tatsuya Oishi under the chief direction of Akiyuki Shinbo at Shaft, has animation character designs by Akio Watanabe and Hideyuki Morioka, and features music composed by Satoru Kōsaki. Morioka and Shaft animator Hiroki Yamamura served as the first film's animation directors and the second and third films' chief animation directors; and the trilogy's scripts were co-written by Yukito Kizawa and Muneo Nakamoto of Write Works under the supervision of Shinbo and Shaft.

The trilogy features two ending themes, both composed by Satoru Kōsaki and written by Meg Rock. The first, "étoile et toi", was used as the ending for the second film, and was sung by Clémentine. The second ending, an alternative version of the first titled "étoile et toi [édition le blanc]", features vocals by Clémentine and Ainhoa, and was used in the third film.

No. overall	No. in season	Title	Directed by	Storyboard artist	Original release date
83	1	"Kizumonogatari I: Tekketsu"; Transliteration: "Kizumonogatari I: Tekketsu-hen" (Japanese: 傷物語〈I鉄血篇〉)	Tatsuya Oishi; Toshimasa Suzuki	Tatsuya Oishi	January 8, 2016
84	2	"Kizumonogatari II: Nekketsu"; Transliteration: "Kizumonogatari II: Nekketsu-hen" (Japanese: 傷物語〈II熱血篇〉)	Yukihiro Miyamoto	Tatsuya Oishi	August 19, 2016
85	3	"Kizumonogatari III: Reiketsu"; Transliteration: "Kizumonogatari III: Reiketsu-Hen" (Japanese: 傷物語〈III冷血篇〉)	Yukihiro Miyamoto; Toshimasa Suzuki	Tatsuya Oishi	January 6, 2017

== Original net animation ==
=== Koyomimonogatari ===
Koyomimonogatari was directed by Tomoyuki Itamura under the chief direction of Akiyuki Shinbo at Shaft, has animation character designs by Akio Watanabe, and features music composed by Satoru Kōsaki. Watanabe, Taisuke Iwasaki, and Shinya Nishizawa served as the season's chief animation directors; and the season's scripts were written by Muneo Nakamoto (episodes 1–2, 5–6, 9–12) and Yukito Kizawa (episodes 3–4, 7–8) of Write Works under the supervision of Shinbo and Shaft.

The season features various pieces of theme music; all of the opening themes were used in previous seasons, either belonging to Bakemonogatari, Nisemonogatari, Nekomonogatari (Black), Onimonogatari, Tsukimonogatari, or Owarimonogatari. One ending theme, unique to this season, was used: "whiz", which was composed and written by Shō Watanabe, and sung by TrySail.

Type	Arc	Director
Ending	All arcs	Hajime Ueda; Takayuki Aizu

No. overall	No. in season	Title	Directed by	Storyboard artist	Original release date
86	1	"Koyomi Stone"; Transliteration: "Koyomi Sutōn" (Japanese: こよみストーン)	Tomoyuki Itamura; Kazuki Ōhashi	Keizō Kusakawa	January 10, 2016
Before the events of Bakemonogatari, Koyomi and Tsubasa delve into the mystery surrounding a stone that was enshrined into one of the school's gardens.
87	2	"Koyomi Flower"; Transliteration: "Koyomi Furawā" (Japanese: こよみフラワー)	Tomoyuki Itamura; Kazuki Ōhashi	Keizō Kusakawa	January 17, 2016
After Hitagi's condition is treated, she and Koyomi investigate the true reason why some flowers were left behind on a street and the school's rooftop.
88	3	"Koyomi Sand"; Transliteration: "Koyomi Sando" (Japanese: こよみサンド)	Takuma Suzuki	Mie Ōishi	January 24, 2016
After Oshino leaves the city, Mayoi informs Koyomi about a sandbox whose shape resembles a devil and he decides to find out why.
89	4	"Koyomi Water"; Transliteration: "Koyomi Wōtā" (Japanese: こよみウォーター)	Takuma Suzuki	Mie Ōishi	January 31, 2016
After Koyomi helps Kanbaru tidy her room, he has a bath in her house, and learns a curious story about the water of the tub.
90	5	"Koyomi Wind"; Transliteration: "Koyomi Uindo" (Japanese: こよみウインド)	Shigeru Fukase	Hiroko Kazui	February 7, 2016
Nadeko comes over to Koyomi's house, and is pleasantly surprised that Koyomi's parents and siblings are all absent. The two then engage in a discussion about Kaiki's curse and his means of spreading the rumor amongst the middle schoolers in town.
91	6	"Koyomi Tree"; Transliteration: "Koyomi Tsurī" (Japanese: こよみツリー)	Shigeru Fukase	Hiroko Kazui	February 14, 2016
Karen asked Koyomi for advice regarding a mysterious grown tree that suddenly appeared on her dojo's backyard.
92	7	"Koyomi Tea"; Transliteration: "Koyomi Tī" (Japanese: こよみティー)	Sō Toyama	Mie Ōishi	February 21, 2016
Tsukihi consults Koyomi regarding her Tea Club members on why her fellow members still believe in the ghostly "eight member" despite Tsukihi proving the rumor was fake.
93	8	"Koyomi Mountain"; Transliteration: "Koyomi Maunten" (Japanese: こよみマウンテン)	Sō Toyama	Mie Ōishi	February 28, 2016
Ougi accompanies Koyomi to the North Shirahebi Shrine, where she tells him that the shrine was originally located not on this mountain top but somewhere else.
94	9	"Koyomi Torus"; Transliteration: "Koyomi Tōrasu" (Japanese: こよみトーラス)	Kei Ajiki	Hiroko Kazui	March 6, 2016
During December, after the events of Otorimonogatari, Koyomi is sitting in his room studying for entrance exams when Shinobu suddenly appears. Koyomi, who had received donuts from Hitagi earlier in the day, decides to treat Shinobu to some of them. While inspecting the donuts, Shinobu notices that they are not "Mr. Donut" brand and states that Koyomi's girlfriend likely poisoned them. After a short argument, Shinobu eats the first donut, stating that it was delicious and insists that she thank Hitagi directly. Koyomi suggests not to, as it would be awkward for Shinobu to introduce herself on such an odd note. Soon after, Koyomi attempts to grab a donut from the four remaining, but Shinobu recoils and states the other ones might be poisoned as well. Koyomi asserts that she's exploiting the situation in order to eat the rest of the donuts, and they eventually come to a compromise, Shinobu will hide each donut around his room, and every one Koyomi doesn't find will be hers to eat. After a cut, the scene transitions to a conversation over the phone between Koyomi and Tsubasa, who is currently overseas scouting out locations for her trip around the world. Koyomi tells Tsubasa that during the game, he was able to find three of the four donuts, but was puzzled on where the last one could have been hidden. Tsubasa presents the idea that Shinobu hid one of the smaller donuts within a larger one, meaning Koyomi would have eaten the evidence of the remaining donut. Koyomi then asks why Shinobu would do such a thing, as it would go against her intentions of consuming the rest of the donuts. Tsubasa responds, saying that it was Shinobu overlooking her selfish motives and chance of personal gain in order to teach Koyomi, not about secrecy or negotiations, but love.
95	10	"Koyomi Seed"; Transliteration: "Koyomi Shīdo" (Japanese: こよみシード)	Kei Ajiki	Hiroko Kazui	March 13, 2016
Yotsugi encounters Koyomi on his way home from the national exams, and asks for his help to search for something. On their hunt, Koyomi discusses his feelings of responsibility to reap the consequences of the seeds he has sown over the past few months.
96	11	"Koyomi Nothing"; Transliteration: "Koyomi Nasshingu" (Japanese: こよみナッシング)	Kenjirou Okada	Tomoyuki Itamura	March 20, 2016
Late February. Araragi is seen fighting with Yozuru in order to become stronger without the use of his vampire powers as she does. Yozuru tells Araragi that he will die before he becomes able to learn her technique. Araragi then poses the question about Yozuru and Yotsugi seeing as how Yotsugi only calls Yozuru "Onee-san" but is unlike all the males she knows, whom she each calls "Onii-san" after their names. Yozuru then tells Araragi that she'll tell him about their relationship only if he lands a single blow against her in battle. Araragi accepts and goes home. Later, Araragi asks his sister Karen for advice. Karen points out how Araragi should have not accepted the fight at all seeing as how it will be impossible to even land a single blow. She also points out that the extremely hard difficulty only proves how Yozuru does not want to tell Araragi the truth, only indirectly rejecting to answer the question. Karen finishes by saying how she would try to not disgrace her opponent by losing the battle without letting the opponent know that she knows about not being answered at all. Thus Araragi prepares to lose gracefully by getting Shinobu to make him a gun using her vampire power of creation and in turn landing a single "blow" even if it is not a punch. The next day, Araragi goes to the mountain where Yozuru should be waiting for him but she never appears.
97	12	"Koyomi Dead"; Transliteration: "Koyomi Deddo" (Japanese: こよみデッド)	Kenjirou Okada	Tomoyuki Itamura	March 27, 2016
March 13, before Araragi is supposed to meet with Senjougahara to go to the university for entrance exams, he goes to the Snake Shrine where he meets Gaen. As Kagenui, Kaiki and Oshino are all missing she feels she has to act. She explains to him how the solution to all the events happening around him would be solved by his death, to which then Gaen proceeds to chop Araragi into small pieces with the original Oddity Killer sword, "Kokoro-Watari". Araragi wakes up in a white void, and is greeted by a familiar face.

=== Monogatari Off & Monster Season ===
Monogatari Off & Monster Season was directed by Midori Yoshizawa under the chief direction of Akiyuki Shinbo at Shaft, has animation character designs by Akio Watanabe. The season's scripts were written by Miku Ooshima under the supervision of Shinbo and Shaft. The series' music was split between prior Monogatari series composers Satoru Kōsaki and Kei Haneoka, with Kōsaki in charge of the first six episodes (Orokamonogatari and Nademonogatari) and Haneoka being in charge of the rest (Wazamonogatari and Shinobumonogatari). Kana Miyai and Nobuhiro Sugiyama served as the season's chief animation directors. Watanabe participated as chief animation director for episodes 1 through 6 (Orokamonogatari and Nademonogatari), and Hiroki Yamamura participated for episodes 7 through 8 (Wazamonogatari).

An extra episode, episode 6.5 adapting the short story "A Cruel Fairy Tale: The Beautiful Princess", aired on August 17, 2024. Although uncredited, the episode was outsourced to Keyakiworks and CG animation studio LUDENS. Yuria Miyazono composed the episode's music, rather than Kōsaki or Haneoka.

Type	Arc	Director	Storyboard artist	Animation director
Opening	Tsukihi Undo	Toshitaka Kanda	—N/a	Kana Miyai
Opening	Nadeko Draw	Shunsuke Ookubo	—N/a	Kazutoshi Makino (Note: Credited under his alias, Makicha (牧茶).)
Opening	Acerola Bon Appétit	Hajime Ueda; Takayuki Aizu	—N/a	—N/a
Opening	Shinobu Mustard	Hajime Ueda; Takayuki Aizu	—N/a	—N/a
Ending	All arcs	Hajime Ueda; Takayuki Aizu	—N/a	—N/a

No. overall	No. in season	Title	Directed by	Storyboard artist	Original release date
104	1	"Tsukihi Undo"; Transliteration: "Tsukihi Andu" (Japanese: つきひアンドゥ)	Yukihiro Miyamoto	Kei Ajiki; Midori Yoshizawa	July 6, 2024
Since staying at the Araragi household, Yotsugi has been observing Tsukihi while pretending to be a doll. However, Tsukihi eventually catches Yotsugi eating ice cream, after she came home early from school. After several attempts at trying to get Yotsugi to move again, Tsukihi douses Yotsugi with oil and tries to light her on fire, but accidentally throws away the match when it burns her, causing Yotsugi to move and catch the match. As a cover story, Yotsugi claims to be a magical girl who traveled from a different dimension and possessed a doll to fight a monster. Tsukihi insists on helping, forcing Yotsugi to visit Nadeko and request her to draw a picture of a slug to be used as the monster, extracting the slug tofu from Nadeko. Yotsugi later summons the monster at the park; however, due to Nadeko's drawing talent, Yotsugi's vulnerability to fire, especially after being doused with oil, and unhelpful intervention from Tsukihi, she is unable to defeat it until Mayoi intervenes. The next day, due to her phoenix traits, Tsukihi forgets the entire ordeal and leaves for school, only to return home early to catch Yotsugi eating ice cream once again.
105	2	"Nadeko Draw, Part One"; Transliteration: "Nadeko Dorō Sono Ichi" (Japanese: なでこドロー 其ノ壹)	Kōji Matsumura	Kōji Matsumura; Midori Yoshizawa	July 13, 2024
After the Tsukihi incident, Yotsugi begins to frequently visit Nadeko. Nadeko had become a shut-in, skipping school to focus on her manga career, which so far had been unsuccessful. Despite pressure from her parents, who told her to either return to school or find a legitimate line of work, Nadeko hopes to eventually achieve success after working for 10,000 hours, or at least win a small award within a year that would convince her parents otherwise. Yotsugi points out the impracticality of the 10,000 hour rule but, believing in Nadeko's talent due to her slug drawing, suggests Nadeko create paper shikigamis of herself to share the burden. Nadeko draws four versions of herself with characteristics based on her past: "Meek" Nadeko, from the Nadeko Snake incident; "Flirty" Nadeko, from when she invited Koyomi to her house; "Wrath" Nadeko, from her outburst at school; and "God" Nadeko, from during her godhood. However, all of them refused to work with Nadeko and escaped, forcing both Nadeko and Yotsugi to chase after them. Nadeko eventually encounters Ougi, who helps her track down a shikigami to her middle school.
106	3	"Nadeko Draw, Part Two"; Transliteration: "Nadeko Dorō Sono Ni" (Japanese: なでこドロー 其ノ貮)	Naoaki Shibuta	Shūichirō Semura	July 20, 2024
Nadeko and Ougi discover "Flirty" Nadeko had taken "Meek" Nadeko's clothes and find her charming the students. Ougi pulls the fire alarm, allowing Nadeko to get close to "Flirty" Nadeko in order to seal her away with a technique taught to her by Yotsugi. Though successful, "Flirty" Nadeko's popularity with the students and demeaning, shallow attitude hurts Nadeko's self-esteem. Nadeko and Ougi split after receiving a tip from Suruga on multiple sightings of "Meek" Nadeko, who was now walking around town half-naked and subsequently nicknamed "Loomer" Nadeko. While searching in the park, Nadeko meets Sodachi, who has returned to town and shows concern towards Nadeko after witnessing "Loomer" Nadeko. Sodachi reassures Nadeko on her choices and advises her to not take her parents' demands at face value. Later, Nadeko tracks "Loomer" Nadeko to the Araragi household.
107	4	"Nadeko Draw, Part Three"; Transliteration: "Nadeko Dorō Sono San" (Japanese: なでこドロー 其ノ參)	Yukihiro Miyamoto	Kōji Matsumura	July 27, 2024
Nadeko goes to Koyomi's room and but meets "Wrath" Nadeko instead, who tries to kill her with a chisel she took from "Meek" Nadeko. After a scuffle, which leaves a hole in the floor and ruins Nadeko's clothes, "Wrath" Nadeko is eventually sealed, but not before she questions Nadeko's motivation. Nadeko borrows new clothes from Tsukihi's wardrobe. Before leaving, she accidentally picks up a phone call from Hitagi, causing her to yank the phone out of the wall in panic. Nadeko makes her way to the North Shirahebi Shrine to find "God" Nadeko, but finds Yotsugi scattered across the shrine, having been cut into pieces by "God" Nadeko after being lured to the shrine by "Meek" Nadeko, who was now wearing a school swimsuit and was subsequently nicknamed "'Chool" Nadeko. Yotsugi was able to stick her right hand on the back of "God" Nadeko to track her. As Nadeko reconstructs Yotsugi, she shuts down the possibility of other specialists and Mayoi helping, and brings up the possibility that "Meek" Nadeko would eventually evolve into a god due to "God" Nadeko's influence. Yotsugi points out that they could use the captured shikigamis to help.
108	5	"Nadeko Draw, Part Four"; Transliteration: "Nadeko Dorō Sono Yon" (Japanese: なでこドロー 其ノ肆)	Teppei Takeya; Naoaki Shibuta; Yukihiro Miyamoto	Atsushi Takahashi; Midori Yoshizawa	August 3, 2024
Yotsugi hypothesizes that, since Nadeko had sealed them away, "Flirty" and "Wrath" Nadeko will be more obedient; therefore, they can use their greater numbers to their advantage. Yotsugi's alternative was to have Shinobu eat the remaining shikigamis, but she understood that the plan would also involve Koyomi, whom Nadeko was supposed to avoid. The two track "God" Nadeko to a bookstore, where Nadeko briefly separates from Yotsugi after being distracted by "'Chool" Nadeko. Nadeko is nearly killed by toppling bookshelves, but "Flirty" Nadeko sacrifices herself by holding the bookshelves long enough for Nadeko to escape; "'Chool" Nadeko was also presumably defeated. Nadeko promises to "Flirty" Nadeko to improve her artwork. Going to the next floor, the two are met with hundreds of "Loomer" Nadekos, which Yotsugi believes was created by "God" Nadeko to protect herself from them. Nadeko hatches a plan, and Yotsugi uses Unlimited Rulebook to destroy the bookstore and incapacitate herself, making an easy pathway to "God" Nadeko.
109	6	"Nadeko Draw, Part Five"; Transliteration: "Nadeko Dorō Sono Gō" (Japanese: なでこドロー 其ノ伍)	Kōji Matsumura	Yasunori Noda; Ryō Shimura; Midori Yoshizawa	August 10, 2024
Nadeko uses a redrawn "Wrath" Nadeko and a new Nadeko shikigami as decoys to trick "God" Nadeko into attacking and defeating them. Nadeko herself poses as a "Loomer" Nadeko to seal away "God" Nadeko, which subsequently erases all the other "Loomer" Nadekos as well. Yotsugi acknowledges that, through her actions, she was no longer like her "God" counterpart, and stays behind to handle the ruined bookstore. Ougi picks Nadeko up in Koyomi's car. Nadeko reflects on how she used her victimhood during the Snake arc as an excuse to manipulate others, and comes to the conclusion that the real "Meek" Nadeko was, similarly, using the other shikigamis as a distraction to achieve her own goals. Nadeko finds "Meek" Nadeko waiting for Koyomi at the high school, and tells her that she has to move on, promising that she will never forget her experiences and will learn to love someone again in the future. The two hold hands as "Meek" Nadeko willingly allows herself to be sealed away. As Nadeko moves onward, she envisions the other Nadekos cheering her on. In a post-credit scene, Tsukihi arrives at Nadeko's house claiming to have covered for Nadeko's invasion of her home before falling asleep. Shinobu appears from Tsukihi's shadow and experiments with Nadeko's newfound shikigami abilities, and the two eventually make peace. After Tsukihi leaves, Yotsugi returns and tells Nadeko that Gaen was interested in working with her after learning how she resolved the shikigami incident.
110	ex	"A Cruel Fairy Tale: The Beautiful Princess"; Transliteration: "Zankoku Dōwa Utsukushihime" (Japanese: 残酷童話 うつくし姫)	Nobutaka Saitō	—	August 17, 2024
600 years prior to the events of the series, there was a princess named Laura who was given the nickname "the Beautiful Princess" due to her physical beauty. Unsatisfied with being tied to her physical appearance, Laura wished for others to see her by her soul. Her wish was satisfied by a witch; however, her soul was considered to be even more beautiful than her physical appearance, leading many, including the witch and her parents, to lose their will to live. Laura became distraught by the growing piles of corpses, but her soul's willpower prevented her from killing herself. Her tears briefly revived the witch's severed head. The head tells Laura that she will, one day, be able to save a life. Until that day comes, she has to distance herself from the rest of the world. Laura embarks on her solitary journey.
111	7	"Acerola Bon Appétit, Part One"; Transliteration: "Aserora Bonapeti Sono Ichi" (Japanese: あせろらボナペティ 其ノ壹)	Ryō Shimura	Akiyuki Shinbo (Note: Credited as the Shaft anagram Tou Fuyashi (東冨耶子).); Ryūhei Aoyagi	August 24, 2024
Hoping to find someone to save, Laura, having taken up the name "Acerola", eventually arrives at a kingdom haunted by a vampire named Deathtopia Virtuoso Suicide-Master. Suicide-Master only eats those that she kills on her own, and starves after Acerola's presence kills all the humans in the kingdom. In spite of resistance from her minion, Tropicalesque Home-A-Wave Dog-Strings, Suicide-Master hunts for Acerola. Any attempts at eating Acerola, however, leads to Suicide-Master's suicide, though due to her immortality, she revives moments later. Knowing Acerola's story and the purpose of her journey, the two strike a truce: Acerola will remain in Suicide-Master's kingdom for the time being while Suicide-Master tries to find a cure for Acerola's curse. In turn, it will give Suicide-Master a chance to figure out how to finally kill and eat Acerola.
112	8	"Acerola Bon Appétit, Part Two"; Transliteration: "Aserora Bonapeti Sono Ni" (Japanese: あせろらボナペティ 其ノ貮)	Ryō Shimura	Akiyuki Shinbo; Ryūhei Aoyagi	August 31, 2024
Suicide-Master instructs Tropicalesque to search for a way to reverse Acerola's curse, and he uncovers a rumor that the curse could be lifted by a prince's kiss. Meanwhile, Suicide-Master forms a bond with Acerola while teaching Acerola to be like her. They discover that Suicide-Master can harm Acerola, if Suicide-Master's willpower outweighed Acerola's. Suicide-Master continues to die of starvation, which each death causing her to shrink, changing her physique to that of a child. Tropicalesque eventually succumbs to Acerola's curse, but does not revive as he was a human-turned-vampire. Watching Suicide-Master consume Tropicalesque, Acerola requests Suicide-Master to turn her into a vampire so Acerola could eat her victims as a send-off. Suicide-Master renames Acerola as Kiss-Shot Acerola-Orion Heart-Under-Blade and converts her. The two separate, and Kiss-Shot becomes a feared vampire. 600 years later, upon hearing of a rumor that Kiss-Shot had finally been defeated by vampire specialists, Suicide-Master contemplates visiting her in Japan.
113	9	"Shinobu Mustard, Part One"; Transliteration: "Shinobu Masutādo Sono Ichi" (Japanese: しのぶマスタード 其ノ壹)	Naoaki Shibuta	Midori Yoshizawa; Ryūhei Aoyagi	September 14, 2024
Following a series of incidents where three female high school students were attacked and mummified by a vampire, Gaen summons Koyomi, promising that she will not interfere with his college life if he agrees to help. The two find a set of flash cards containing a code from the latest-discovered victim, and Koyomi gives the flash cards to his college friend Meniko Hamukai, who decrypts the code into Suicide-Master's initials. Gaen discovers a second link between all the victims: they were all part of the girl's basketball team. Koyomi visits Suruga and meets Seiu Higasa, who had previously succeeded Suruga as the team captain but had also retired. They reveal that the basketball team had fallen into despair after their retirements and five members of the team have since gone missing.
114	10	"Shinobu Mustard, Part Two"; Transliteration: "Shinobu Masutādo Sono Ni" (Japanese: しのぶマスタード 其ノ貮)	Osamu Sumiya	Mie Ōishi	September 21, 2024
Seiu and Suruga reveal that the team was unable to keep up with the rigorous framework established by Suruga, leaving team morale low. Seiu entrusts Koyomi with the team roster, which he gives to Gaen. Though instructed to distract Shinobu from the incident, Koyomi asks her about the vampire responsible for converting her and learns about her history with Suicide-Master. Mayoi summons the two to her shine, showing them a mummified Suicide-Master. Mayoi tells Koyomi to retrieve blood from the Blood Pond in Hell to revive Suicide-Master, and Shinobu sends Koyomi to Hell by killing him.
115	11	"Shinobu Mustard, Part Three"; Transliteration: "Shinobu Masutādo Sono San" (Japanese: しのぶマスタード 其ノ參)	Yukihiro Miyamoto	Midori Yoshizawa; Mie Ōishi; Yasuhiro Noda	September 28, 2024
Instead of arriving in Hell, Koyomi is brought into Heaven by a masked Acerola, whose soul split away from Kiss-Shot after she became a vampire. Feeling regretful for burdening Suicide-Master with her decision to become a vampire, Acerola kisses Koyomi, giving him her saliva to save Suicide-Master. Gaen revives Koyomi, and he administers the saliva to Suicide-Master, beginning her recovery. Gaen tells Koyomi that the fourth victim was found and gives him another code. Mayoi explains how she first met Suicide-Master as she was arriving, then sent her in Shinobu's direction before Mayoi found her buried near the shrine a week later. The group hypothesizes Suicide-Master's reason for coming to visit Shinobu, and Shinobu vouches for her innocence, as her weaker state shows that she likely lost the taste of human blood after converting Acerola. Gaen believes in the possibility that Suicide-Master was being framed by another vampire. The group splits in the morning, but they resolve to solve the incident before Kagenui arrives to exterminate Suicide-Master.
116	12	"Shinobu Mustard, Part Four"; Transliteration: "Shinobu Masutādo Sono Yon" (Japanese: しのぶマスタード 其ノ肆)	Kōji Matsumura	Kei Ajiki	October 5, 2024
Meniko decrypts the second code to "F/C", which prove difficult to interpret: no one on the basketball team has the initials, and Koyomi's guess that it meant "fan club" went nowhere after asking Karen and finding nothing suspicious about Suruga's fan club. Gaen also confirms that everyone else on the basketball team was safe, meaning that the second vampire was not likely among them. Gaen reveals that Kagenui had a questionable and problematic past with Suicide-Master, and worries that Kagenui would not be as willing to consider Suicide-Master's innocence as they were. At night, Koyomi borrows Suruga's house to revive Suicide-Master, with Suruga going to a pajama party with Seiu and other former members. Upon reviving, Suicide-Master reunites with Shinobu.
117	13	"Shinobu Mustard, Part Five"; Transliteration: "Shinobu Masutādo Sono Go" (Japanese: しのぶマスタード 其ノ伍)	Shōhei Fujita; Naoaki Shibuta; Midori Yoshizawa	Midori Yoshizawa; Ryūhei Aoyagi	October 12, 2024
Gaen reveals that they found the belongings and school uniform of the final missing victim in the girl's locker room, but were unable to find a body. She believes the vampire was receiving leaked intel from the investigation and leaving red herrings as a result. In addition, DNA analysis from the victims' found that the genetics matched Suicide-Master's, placing her as the primary suspect once again. After her reunion, Suicide-Master thanks Koyomi for saving her and Shinobu's life. She claimed that she came to Japan only to visit Shinobu, but died after failing her landing. Not wanting to show herself to Shinobu in a weak state, she fed on a high school student's blood. However, the student's despair acted as a sort of "food poisoning" and caused Suicide-Master to die yet again. Gaen concludes that the student, believed to be the missing victim, successfully turned into a vampire and assumed Suicide-Master's identity after burying her, attacked the remaining victims, and planted red herrings, including the two codes, to throw off the investigation. Koyomi and Gaen realize Suruga's pajama party was likely the vampire's next target.
118	14	"Shinobu Mustard, Part Six"; Transliteration: "Shinobu Masutādo Sono Roku" (Japanese: しのぶマスタード 其ノ陸)	Midori Yoshizawa	Mie Ōishi	October 19, 2024
Upon arriving and asking Suruga and the girls, Koyomi realizes that he was in the wrong place, and deduces the vampire's identity as Kie Harimaze, the first student Suicide-Master met after landing in Japan. Suicide-Master had lied during her questioning: she had merely asked Kie for directions, and only fed on Kie because of Kie's despair towards her high school life and the basketball team. Subsequently, Kie switched her clothes with her first victim, taking advantage of how difficult it was to identify mummified bodies, and spied on the investigation via a cellphone that Gaen had taken. However, the phone died before Kie could learn Suruga's whereabouts, and therefore she went to Suruga's home instead of the pajama party. Sensing Kie was unsatisfied with her conversion, Suicide-Master offers to be consumed, and Kie could choose to either return human or become a stronger vampire. Otherwise, Suicide-Master was hoping to commit suicide and stay dead, upon seeing how happy Shinobu was with Koyomi and no longer feeling regret for Shinobu's conversion. Koyomi stops Kie from consuming Suicide-Master and asks her to turn herself and her victims back into humans, but she refuses and tries to eat Koyomi instead. Kagenui arrives and incapacitates Kie, but allows her to become human again and save her victims. Suicide-Master also gets spared but is exiled and deported, but not before she bids Shinobu farewell. Koyomi tells the entire story to Hitagi. Gaen keeps her promise to Koyomi and considers creating a rumor division.

== Original video animation ==
A short episode adapting the short short story Koyomi History was first shown during SHAFT's Madogatari Exhibition and then released in the homonymous DVD for the event.

No. overall	No. in season	Title	Directed by	Storyboard artist	Original release date
—	—	"Koyomi History"; Transliteration: "Koyomi Hisutorī" (Japanese: こよみヒストリー)	Akio Watanabe	Akio Watanabe	September 22, 2016

== Character commentaries ==
Audio commentaries are content available on the DVD/BD release of the series. Each episode features two characters having a conversation about the specific episode they are in. In Monogatari's case, the author of the series, Nisio Isin, has written each one of them.

- Bakemonogatari
  - Bakemonogatari Vol. 1 / Hitagi Crab (「化物語」 第一巻 / ひたぎクラブ) (Aniplex. 2009)
  - Bakemonogatari Vol. 2 / Mayoi Maimai (「化物語」 第二巻 / まよいマイマイ) (Aniplex. 2009)
  - Bakemonogatari Vol. 3 / Suruga Monkey (「化物語」 第三巻 / するがモンキー) (Aniplex. 2009)
  - Bakemonogatari Vol. 4 / Nadeko Snake (「化物語」 第四巻 / なでこスネイク) (Aniplex. 2010)
  - Bakemonogatari Vol. 5 / Tsubasa Cat (1-3) (「化物語」 第五巻 / つばさキャット（上）) (Aniplex. 2010)
  - Bakemonogatari Vol. 6 / Tsubasa Cat (4-5) (「化物語」 第六巻 / つばさキャット（下）) (Aniplex. 2010)
- Nisemonogatari
  - Nisemonogatari Vol. 1 / Karen Bee (1-2) (偽物語 第一巻 / かれんビー（上）) (Aniplex. 2012)
  - Nisemonogatari Vol. 2 / Karen Bee (3-5) (偽物語 第ニ巻 / かれんビー（中）) (Aniplex. 2012)
  - Nisemonogatari Vol. 3 / Karen Bee (6-7) (偽物語 第三巻 / かれんビー（下）) (Aniplex. 2012)
  - Nisemonogatari Vol. 4 / Tsukihi Phoenix (1-2) (偽物語 第四巻 / つきひフェニックス（上）) (Aniplex. 2012)
  - Nisemonogatari Vol. 5 / Tsukihi Phoenix (3-4) (偽物語 第五巻 / つきひフェニックス（下）) (Aniplex. 2012)
- Nekomonogatari (Kuro)
  - Nekomonogatari (Kuro) Vol. 1 / Tsubasa Family (1-2) (「猫物語（黒）」第一巻 / つばさファミリー（上）) (Aniplex. 2013)
  - Nekomonogatari (Kuro) Vol. 2 / Tsubasa Family (3-4) (「猫物語（黒）」第二巻 / つばさファミリー（下）) (Aniplex. 2013)
- Nekomonogatari (Shiro)
  - Nekomonogatari (Shiro) Vol. 1 / Tsubasa Tiger (1-3) (「猫物語（白）」 第一巻 / つばさタイガー（上）) (Aniplex. 2013)
  - Nekomonogatari (Shiro) Vol. 2 / Tsubasa Tiger (4-5) (「猫物語（白）」 第二巻 / つばさタイガー（下）) (Aniplex. 2013)
- Kabukimonogatari
  - Kabukimonogatari Vol. 1 / Mayoi Jiangshi (1-2) (「傾物語」第一巻 / まよいキョンシー（上）) (Aniplex. 2013)
  - Kabukimonogatari Vol. 2 / Mayoi Jiangshi (3-4) (「傾物語」第二巻 / まよいキョンシー（下）) (Aniplex. 2014)
- Otorimonogatari
  - Otorimonogatari Vol. 1 / Nadeko Medusa (1-2) (「囮物語」第一巻 / なでこメドゥーサ（上）) (Aniplex. 2014)
  - Otorimonogatari Vol. 2 / Nadeko Medusa (3-4) (「囮物語」第二巻 / なでこメドゥーサ（下）) (Aniplex. 2014)
- Onimonogatari
  - Onimonogatari Vol. 1 / Shinobu Time (1-2) (「鬼物語」第一巻 / しのぶタイム（上）) (Aniplex. 2014)
  - Onimonogatari Vol. 2 / Shinobu Time (3-4) (「鬼物語」第二巻 / しのぶタイム（下）) (Aniplex. 2014)
- Koimonogatari
  - Koimonogatari Vol. 1 / Hitagi End (1-3) (「恋物語」第一巻 / ひたぎエンド（上）) (Aniplex. 2014)
  - Koimonogatari Vol. 2 / Hitagi End (4-6) (「恋物語」第二巻 / ひたぎエンド（下）) (Aniplex. 2014)
- Hanamonogatari
  - Hanamonogatari Vol. 1 / Suruga Devil (1-2) (「花物語」第一巻 / するがデビル（上）) (Aniplex. 2014)
  - Hanamonogatari Vol. 2 / Suruga Devil (3-5) (「花物語」第二巻 / するがデビル（下）) (Aniplex. 2014)
- Tsukimonogatari
  - Tsukimonogatari Vol. 1 / Yotsugi Doll (1-2) (「憑物語」第一巻 / よつぎドール（上）) (Aniplex. 2015)
  - Tsukimonogatari Vol. 2 / Yotsugi Doll (3-4) (「憑物語」第二巻 / よつぎドール（下）) (Aniplex. 2015)
- Owarimonogatari
  - Owarimonogatari Vol. 1 / Ogi Formula (「終物語」第一巻 / おうぎフォーミュラ) (Aniplex. 2015)
  - Owarimonogatari Vol. 2 / Sodachi Riddle (「終物語」第二巻 / そだちリドル) (Aniplex. 2016)
  - Owarimonogatari Vol. 3 / Sodachi Lost (「終物語」第三巻 / そだちロスト) (Aniplex. 2016)
  - Owarimonogatari Vol. 4 / Shinobu Mail (1-3) (「終物語」第四巻 / しのぶメイル（上）) (Aniplex. 2016)
  - Owarimonogatari Vol. 5 / Shinobu Mail (4-6) (「終物語」第五巻 / しのぶメイル（下）) (Aniplex. 2016)
  - Owarimonogatari Vol. 6 / Mayoi Hell (「終物語」第六巻 / まよいヘル) (Aniplex. 2017)
  - Owarimonogatari Vol. 7 / Hitagi Rendezvous (「終物語」第七巻 / ひたぎランデブー) (Aniplex. 2017)
  - Owarimonogatari Vol. 8 / Ogi Dark (「終物語」第八巻 / おうぎダーク) (Aniplex. 2017)
- Koyomimonogatari (暦物語) (Aniplex. 2016)
- Kizumonogatari
  - Kizumonogatari 1 Iron Blooded Arc (傷物語〈I鉄血篇〉) (Aniplex. 2016)
  - Kizumonogatari 2 Hot Blooded Arc (傷物語〈II熱血篇〉) (Aniplex. 2016)
  - Kizumonogatari 3 Cold Blooded Arc (傷物語〈III冷血篇〉) (Aniplex. 2017)
- Zoku Owarimonogatari
  - Zoku Owarimonogatari Vol. 1 / Koyomi Reverse (1-3) (「続・終物語」こよみリバース 上) (Aniplex. 2019)
  - Zoku Owarimonogatari Vol. 2 / Koyomi Reverse (4-6) (「続・終物語」こよみリバース 下) (Aniplex. 2019)
- Orokamonogatari
  - Orokamonogatari / Tsukihi Undo (「愚物語」/ つきひアンドゥ) (Aniplex. 2024)
- Nademonogatari
  - Nademonogatari Vol.1 / Nadeko Draw (1-2) (「撫物語」第一巻 / なでこドロー(上)) (Aniplex. 2025)
  - Nademonogatari Vol.2 / Nadeko Draw (3-5) (「撫物語」第一巻 / なでこドロー(下)) (Aniplex. 2025)
- Wazamonogatari
  - Wazamonogatari / Acerola Bon Appétit (「業物語」/ あせろらボナペティ) (Aniplex. 2025)
- Shinobumonogatari
  - Shinobumonogatari Vol.1 / Shinobu Mustard (1-2) (「忍物語」第一巻 / しのぶマスタード(上)) (Aniplex. 2025)
  - Shinobumonogatari Vol.2 / Shinobu Mustard (3-4) (「忍物語」第一巻 / しのぶマスタード(中)) (Aniplex. 2025)
  - Shinobumonogatari Vol.3 / Shinobu Mustard (5-6) (「「忍物語」第一巻 / しのぶマスタード(下)) (Aniplex. 2025)

== Recap episodes ==
These episodes aired throughout the run of the series.

No. overall	No. in season	Title	Directed by	Storyboard artist	Original release date
5.5	5.5	"Bakemonogatari Special" (Japanese: 化物語スペシャル)	—	—	August 7, 2009
A recap of episodes 1-5 of Bakemonogatari
—	—	"The story of Araragi Koyomi and the girls who encountered oddities" Transliteration: "Araragi Koyomi to, kaii ni iki atta shoujo-tachi no monogatari" (Japanese: 阿良々木暦と、怪異に行き遭った少女たちの物語)	—	—	December 31, 2012
A short recap before Nekomonogatari (Black), where Oshino explains what happened to Araragi in Kizumonogatari, introduces briefly the girls encountered in Bakemonogatari, and then focuses on Hanekawa
—	—	"Summary One"; Transliteration: "Sōshūhen I" (Japanese: 総集編I)	—	—	August 10, 2013
A recap episode retelling the events of Nekomonogatari (Black), narrated by Koyomi
—	—	"Summary Two"; Transliteration: "Sōshūhen II" (Japanese: 総集編II)	—	—	September 14, 2013
A recap episode retelling the events of Bakemonogatari from "Hitagi Crab" to "Nadeko Snake", narrated by Koyomi
—	—	"Summary Three"; Transliteration: "Sōshūhen III" (Japanese: 総集編III)	—	—	October 19, 2013
A recap episode retelling the events of Bakemonogatari's "Tsubasa Cat" and the entirety of Nisemonogatari, narrated by Koyomi
90.5	0.5	"Heading Towards the End of the Story"; Transliteration: "Owari ni Mukau Monogatari" (Japanese: 終ワリニ向カウ物語)	—	—	August 12, 2017
A recap episode retelling the events of Kizumonogatari's "Koyomi Vamp", Bakemonogatari's "Mayoi Mai Mai", Onimonogatari's "Shinobu Time", Tsukimonogatari's "Yotsugi Doll", Koyomimonogatari's "Koyomi Nothing" and "Koyomi Dead", narrated by Koyomi
94.5	4.5	"Araragi Koyomi's Story"; Transliteration: "Araragi Koyomi no Monogatari" (Japanese: 阿良々木暦ノ物語)	—	—	August 13, 2017
A reflection on Koyomi's school year, narrated by Hanekawa
—	—	"The Story Starting From Now"; Transliteration: "Kokokara Hajimeru Monogatari" (Japanese: ココカラ始メル物語)	—	—	May 3, 2024
A recap episode retelling the events of the series up to Zoku Owarimonogatari prior to the Off & Monster Season release
