= Yoshiaki Itou =

Japanese animator & director

Yoshiaki Itou 伊藤 良明
- Born: 1967 (age 58–59)
- Occupations: Animator, character designer
- Years active: 1987–present
- Employer: Shaft (1987–present)
- Known for: Kino's Journey: Country of Illness -For You- Gakuen Alice; Hidamari Sketch

Yoshiaki Itou (Japanese: 伊藤良明, Hepburn: Itō Yoshiaki) is a Japanese animator and character designer best known for designing the characters to Hidamari Sketch (2007–2013).

== Career ==
Itou joined Shaft in 1987 as an in-between animator, and by 1989 he was promoted to key animator. In 1995, the studio produced its first original televised work, Juuni Senshi Bakuretsu Eto Ranger, which featured Itou's promotion to animation director. Shaft received numerous outsourcing jobs throughout the 90s of varying genres and styles, some of which had cute characters and comedy-oriented stories, and others which were more serious and had less-than-cute characters. Itou was particularly involved with the mecha series Dual! Parallel Trouble Adventure (1998), which may have led to his other mecha work on Dai-Guard (1999) and Sakura Wars (2000), in which he was also given the responsibility of mecha animation director (メカ作監) for a few episodes alongside general key animation and animation direction roles. Itou's first role as a character designer wasn't in-house on a Shaft work, but rather at Group TAC to whom he was lent to. Shaft had developed a relationship with Atsuhiro Iwakami, at the time a producer from SME Visual Works (now called Aniplex) after Shaft was outsourced to for a few episodes of Android Kikaider: The Animation (2001); and Group TAC, needing a character designer for Gakuen Alice (2004), received Itou's help as both character designer and chief animation director due to Iwakami's connection to Shaft.

Three years later, Itou took on the job of character designer for both Hidamari Sketch and a short film adaptation of Kino's Journey, the former of which began a long-running franchise of anime. Although he had worked on Shaft's titles with director Akiyuki Shinbo (who began a long-standing collaboration with the studio in 2004) prior to Hidamari Sketch, the series was Itou's first time directly working with Shinbo; and having seen Shinbo's prior works, such as Le Portrait de Petit Cossette (2004), Itou was initially nervous. Both Shinbo and Ume Aoki, the creator of the Hidamari Sketch manga, thought that he seemed "delicate." Ironically, despite Itou's prior abilities as a mecha animator, he likes cute and warm works, so he felt instantly attracted to Aoki's drawings in the manga. He had trouble with designing and drawing the characters, but was able to succeed with Aoki directly helping with the key elements of her drawings. Aoki stated that she was relieved for the anime seeing that Itou understood the characters–not just in the style of the drawings themselves, but also in the way that he poses the characters–and said that his drawings were cute. Although Itou also had the role of "chief animation director", he mentioned that he didn't touch the drawings for the second episode of the first season due to the quality of animation director Hideyuki Morioka's drawings. Until 2013, when the anime series ended, Itou continued to design the characters for and act as chief animation director for Hidamari Sketch (and even storyboarded an episode), occasionally helping out as a chief animation director on other series like Natsu no Arashi (2009).

Around 2015, Itou was given the offer by Mitsutoshi Kubota, Shaft's president, to act as a meal designer (メシデザイン) and meal animation director (メシ作監) (Note: Otaquest translates the role as "Cuisine Coordinator", but "meal animation director" is a more accurate translation unless Itou is referring to the credit with a different name.) for Gourmet Girl Graffiti. Itou was given the opportunity since he worked a lot with food-related scenes in the anime he worked on, saying that cooking scenes in TV anime ended up getting passed to him in many cases. Since Gourmet Girl Graffiti is mainly focused on cooking, such a role unifying all of the animators' works into a cohesive approach as far as drawings and even color was necessary. Attaining a visual style proved to be somewhat difficult, as Shinbo's only advice when presented with a design was that it "wasn't quite there yet." He worked closely with the color designer, Yasuko Watanabe, and the director of photography, Takayuki Aizu, to achieve what became the result used in the anime itself. Itou himself was in charge of the design and drawings of the food–and he'd also choose which colors to keep and leave out, as well as things like the brightness–and Watanabe would color them per her tastes, and the compositors (Aizu) would then add textures and give more input. Itou ended up focusing on the series' odd episodes and splitting the "meal animation director" role with Hirotoshi Arai, who took on the even episodes. Another aspect of the animation front for the series was using a lot of layers for the food to show depth and, generally, to make it look as good as possible; however, such a method isn't particularly workable under most TV schedules, especially on series where the food isn't a focus, so on a scene Itou was responsible for on March Comes In like a Lion (2016), he made sure that the staff only used two or three layers for the food drawings to reduce the time stress on the production staff's plate.

== Works ==
This is an incomplete list.

=== Teleivison series ===
Year	Title	Director(s)	Studio	CD (Note: Character designer.)	CAD (Note: Chief animation director.)	AD (Note: Animation director.)	KA (Note: Key animator.)	Other roles and notes	Ref(s)
1987	Hiatari Ryōkō!	Gisaburō Sugii; Hiroko Tokita	Group TAC	No	No	No	No	In-between animator	
1989	Idol Densetsu Eriko	Tetsurō Amino	Ashi Productions	No	No	No	Yes	In-between animator	
1990	Kyatto Ninden Teyandee	Kunitoshi Okajima	Tatsunoko Production	No	No	No	Yes		
1991	Oh! My Konbu	Tetsuo Imazawa	Studio Koriumi	No	No	No	Yes		
1992	Thumbelina: A Magical Story	Hiromitsu Morita	Enoki Films	No	No	No	Yes		
1993	The Irresponsible Captain Tylor	Kōichi Mashimo	Tatsunoko Production	No	No	No	Yes		
1994	The Legend of Snow White	Kunitoshi Okajima	Tatsunoko Production	No	No	No	Yes		
1995	Juuni Senshi Bakuretsu Eto Ranger	Kunitoshi Okajima	Shaft	No	No	Yes	Yes		
1996	Kiko-chan's Smile	Setsuko Shibuichi	Magic Bus	No	No	No	Yes		
1997	Revolutionary Girl Utena	Kunihiko Ikuhara	J.C.Staff	No	No	No	Yes		
1997	Battle Athletes Victory	Katsuhito Akiyama	AIC	No	No	Yes	Yes		
1998	Silent Mobius	Hideki Tonokatsu; Nobuyuki Takeuchi	Radix; Shaft	No	No	Yes	Yes		
1998	Generator Gawl	Seiji Mizushima	Tatsunoko Production	No	No	No	Yes		
1999	Space Pirate Mito	Takashi Watanabe	Triangle Staff	No	No	No	Yes		
1999	Dual! Parallel Trouble Adventures	Katsuhito Akiyama	AIC	No	No	Yes	Yes		
1999	A Pair of Queens	Takashi Watanabe	Triangle Staff	No	No	No	Yes		
1999	Dai Guard	Seiji Mizushima	Xebec	No	No	Yes	Yes	Mecha animation director	
1999	Now and Then, Here and There	Akitaro Daichi	AIC	No	No	No	Yes		
1999	Magic User's Club	Junichi Sato	Triangle Staff; Madhouse	No	No	Yes	Yes		
2000	Boogiepop Phantom	Takashi Watanabe	Madhouse	No	No	Yes	No		
2000	Sakura Wars	Ryūtarō Nakamura	Madhouse	No	No	Yes	Yes	Mecha animation director	
2000	Android Kikaider: The Animation	Tensai Okamura	Radix; Studio Ox	No	No	No	Yes		
2000	Dotto Koni-chan	Shinichi Watanabe; Kenji Yasuda	Shaft	No	No	Yes	Yes		
2001	Sister Princess	Kiyotaka Oohata	Zexcs	No	No	No	Yes		
2001	The SoulTaker	Akiyuki Shinbo	Tatsunoko Production; Tatsunoko VCR	No	No	No	Yes		
2001	Cyborg 009: The Cyborg Soldier	Jun Kawagoe	Japan Vistec	No	No	No	Yes		
2001	Mahoromatic	Hiroyuki Yamaga	Gainax; Shaft	No	No	Yes	Yes	Assistant animation director	
2002	Mahoromatic: Something More Beautiful	Hiroyuki Yamaga	Gainax; Shaft	No	No	Yes	Yes	Assistant animation director	
2002	Seven of Seven	Yasuhiro Imagawa	A.C.G.T	No	No	Yes	Yes		
2002	G-On Riders	Shinichiro Kimura	TNK	No	No	No	Yes		
2003	Popotan	Shinichiro Kimura	Shaft	No	Yes	Yes	Yes		
2003	Kino's Journey	Ryūtarō Nakamura	A.C.G.T	No	No	Yes	No		
2003	Maburaho	Shinichiro Kimura	J.C.Staff	No	No	Yes	Yes		
2004	Gakuen Alice	Takahiro Omori	Group TAC	Yes	Yes	Yes	No		
2004	Tetsujin 28-gou	Yasuhiro Imagawa	Palm Studio	No	No	No	Yes		
2004	This Ugly yet Beautiful World	Shouji Saeki	Gainax; Shaft	No	No	Yes	Yes		
2004	Tsukuyomi: Moon Phase	Akiyuki Shinbo	Shaft	No	No	No	No	Assistant animation director (Blu-ray version)	
2005	Pani Poni Dash!	Akiyuki Shinbo; Shin Oonuma	Shaft	No	No	Yes	Yes	Assistant animation director Eyecatch	
2006	REC	Ryūtarō Nakamura	Shaft	No	No	Yes	Yes		
2006	Negima!?	Akiyuki Shinbo; Shin Oonuma	Shaft	No	No	Yes	Yes	Assistant animation director	
2007	Hidamari Sketch	Akiyuki Shinbo; Ryouki Kamitsubo	Shaft	Yes	Yes	Yes	Yes		
2007	Sayonara, Zetsubou-Sensei	Akiyuki Shinbo	Shaft	No	Yes	No	Yes		
2007	Ef: A Tale of Memories	Shin Oonuma	Shaft	No	No	Yes	Yes	Assistant animation director	
2008	Hidamari Sketch x 365	Akiyuki Shinbo	Shaft	Yes	Yes	Yes	Yes		
2008	Ef: A Tale of Melodies	Shin Oonuma	Shaft	No	No	Yes	No		
2009	Natsu no Arashi!	Akiyuki Shinbo; Shin Oonuma	Shaft	No	Yes	Yes	Yes		
2009	Maria Holic	Akiyuki Shinbo; Yukihiro Miyamoto	Shaft	No	No	Yes	Yes		
2009	Bakemonogatari	Akiyuki Shinbo; Tatsuya Oishi	Shaft	No	No	Yes	Yes	Assistant animation director	
2009	Zan Sayonara, Zetsubou-Sensei	Akiyuki Shinbo; Yukihiro Miyamoto	Shaft	No	No	No	Yes		
2010	Hidamari Sketch x Hoshimittsu	Akiyuki Shinbo; Kenichi Ishikura	Shaft	Yes	Yes	Yes	No		
2010	And Yet the Town Moves	Akiyuki Shinbo	Shaft	No	No	Yes	Yes		
2011	Hidamari Sketch x SP	Akiyuki Shinbo	Shaft	Yes	Yes	Yes	Yes	Storyboard artist	
2011	Puella Magi Madoka Magica	Akiyuki Shinbo; Yukihiro Miyamoto	Shaft	No	No	Yes	Yes	Assistant animation director	
2012	Hidamari Sketch x Honeycomb	Akiyuki Shinbo; Yuki Yase	Shaft	Yes	Yes	Yes	Yes		
2012	Nisemonogatari	Akiyuki Shinbo; Tomoyuki Itamura	Shaft	No	No	Yes	No		
2013	Monogatari Series Second Season	Akiyuki Shinbo; Tomoyuki Itamura; Naoyuki Tatsuwa; Yuki Yase	Shaft	No	No	Yes	No	Assistant animation director	
2014	Nisekoi	Akiyuki Shinbo; Naoyuki Tatsuwa	Shaft	No	No	Yes	Yes	Assistant animation director	
2014	Mekakucity Actors	Akiyuki Shinbo; Yuki Yase	Shaft	No	No	No	Yes		
2014	Hanamonogatari	Akiyuki Shinbo; Tomoyuki Itamura	Shaft	No	No	Yes	Yes		
2015	Gourmet Girl Graffiti	Akiyuki Shinbo; Naoyuki Tatsuwa	Shaft	No	No	Yes	Yes	Meal designer Meal animation director	
2015	Nisekoi:	Akiyuki Shinbo; Yukihiro Miyamoto	Shaft	No	No	No	Yes		
2015	Owarimonogatari	Akiyuki Shinbo; Tomoyuki Itamura	Shaft	No	No	Yes	Yes		
2016	March Comes In like a Lion	Akiyuki Shinbo; Kenjirou Okada	Shaft	No	No	No	Yes	Assistant animation director	
2017	March Comes In like a Lion 2nd Season	Akiyuki Shinbo; Kenjirou Okada	Shaft	No	No	Yes	Yes		
2018	Fate/Extra: Last Encore	Akiyuki Shinbo; Yukihiro Miyamoto	Shaft	No	No	Yes	Yes	Assistant animation director 2nd key animator	
2019	The Quintessential Quintuplets	Satoshi Kuwabara	Tezuka Productions	No	No	No	Yes		
2019	Zoku Owarmonogatari	Akiyuki Shinbo	Shaft	No	No	Yes	Yes		
2020	Magia Record: Puella Magi Madoka Magica Side Story	Doroinu; Yukihiro Miyamoto; Kenjirou Okada; Midori Yoshizawa	Shaft	No	No	Yes	No	Main animator	
2020	Lapis Re:Lights	Hiroyuki Hata	Yokohama Animation Lab	No	No	Yes	No		
2020	Assault Lily Bouquet	Shouji Saeki; Hajime Ootani	Shaft	No	No	Yes	No	2nd key animator	
2021	Pretty Boy Detective Club	Akiyuki Shinbo; Hajime Ootani	Shaft	No	No	Yes	Yes		
2021	Magia Record: The Eve of Awakening	Doroinu; Yukihiro Miyamoto	Shaft	No	Yes	Yes	Yes		
2022	Magia Record: Dawn of a Shallow Dream	Doroinu; Yukihiro Miyamoto	Shaft	No	No	No	Yes		
2022	RWBY: Ice Queendom	Toshimasa Suzuki; Kenjirou Okada	Shaft	No	Yes	Yes	Yes		
2022	Luminous Witches	Shouji Saeki	Shaft	No	No	No	No	Assistant animation director	
2023	Mashle	Tomonari Tanaka	A-1 Pictures	No	No	Yes	No		
2023	Zom 100: Bucket List of the Dead	Kazuki Kawagoe	Bug Films	No	No	Yes	No		
2024	Mashle: The Divine Visionary Candidate Arc	Tomonari Tanaka	A-1 Pictures	No	No	Yes	No		
2025	A Ninja and an Assassin Under One Roof	Yukihiro Miyamoto	Shaft	No	Yes	Yes	Yes	Main animator	

=== OVAs/ONAs ===
Year	Title	Director(s)	Studio	CD	CAD	AD	KA	Other roles and notes	Ref(s)
1987	Taiman Blues: Naoto Shimizu-hen	Takao Yotsuji	Shaft	No	No	No	No	In-between animator	
1990	Hidan no O'Clock!!	Osamu Inoue; Hiroaki Inoue	Toei Animation	No	No	No	Yes		
1994	Baki the Grappler	Yuuji Asada	Knack	No	No	No	Yes		
1995	Inma Youjo	Kazuma Muraki	Magic Bus	No	No	No	Yes		
1995	SM Girls: Saber Marionette R	Koji Masunari	Zero-G Room	No	No	No	Yes		
1995	Weather Report Girl	Kunihiko Yuyama	Pastel	No	No	No	Yes		
1995	Legend of the Galactic Heroes	Noboru Ishiguro; Masatoshi Tahara; Keizou Shimizu	Shaft (Note: Kitty Film Mitaka Studio produced the first 86 episodes and was assisted by various studios, one of which was Magic Bus which contracted Shaft for some sub-contracting work. Following the demise of Kitty Films, K-Factory took over production and outsourced all animation to one of four studios, one of which was Shaft. Gaiden was likewise outsourced to Shaft and other studios by K-Factory.)	No	No	No	Yes		
1996	Shadow Skill	Hiroshi Negishi	Zero-G Room	No	No	No	Yes		
1997	Legend of Crystania: The Chaos Ring	Ryūtarō Nakamura	Triangle Staff	No	No	No	Yes		
1998	Legend of the Galactic Heroes Gaiden	Noboru Ishiguro	Shaft	No	No	No	Yes		
2000	Kita e. Pure Session	Mitsuko Kase	Studio D-Volt	No	No	Yes	No		
2002	Arcade Gamer Fubuki	Yuuji Mutou	Shaft	No	No	Yes	Yes	Assistant chief animation director Preview animation	
2003	Papillon Rose	Shinji Tobita	Studio Kelmadick	No	No	Yes	No		
2006	Negima: Spring Special	Akiyuki Shinbo; Shin Oonuma	Shaft	No	No	No	Yes	Assistant animation director	
2008	Goku Sayonara, Zetsubou-Sensei	Akiyuki Shinbo; Yukihiro Miyamoto	Shaft	No	No	Yes	No	Assistant animation director	
2011	Katteni Kaizō	Akiyuki Shinbo; Naoyuki Tatsuwa	Shaft	No	No	Yes	Yes	Assistant chief animation director Assistant animation director	
2012	Palutena's Revolting Dinner	Akiyuki Shinbo	Shaft	No	No	Yes	No		
2013	Hidamari Sketch: Sae & Hiro's Graduation Arc	Akiyuki Shinbo; Yuki Yase	Shaft	Yes	Yes	Yes	Yes		
2015	Magical Suite Prism Nana: I Want to Fulfill My Dreams!? Hope Advancing [Part 1]	Yukihiro Miyamoto	Shaft	No	No	No	No	Main animator	
2016	Koyomimonogatari	Akiyuki Shinbo; Tomoyuki Itamura	Shaft	No	No	Yes	Yes		
2024	Monogatari Series Off & Monster Season	Akiyuki Shinbo; Midori Yoshizawa	Shaft	No	No	Yes	Yes		
2025	Magical Suite Prism Nana: I Want to Fulfill My Dreams!? Hope Advancing [Part 2]	Yukihiro Miyamoto	Shaft	No	No	Yes	Yes	Main animator	

=== Films ===
Year	Title	Director(s)	Studio	CD	CAD	AD	KA	Other roles and notes	Ref(s)
1988	Bikkuriman: Muen Zone no Hihou	Junichi Sato	Toei Animation	No	No	No	No	In-between animator	
1988	Hiatari Ryōkō! Kasumi: Yume no Naka ni Kimi ga Ita	Kimiharu Ogawa	Group TAC	No	No	No	No	In-between animator	
1996	Tenchi the Movie: Tenchi Muyo in Love	Hiroshi Negishi	AIC	No	No	No	Yes		
1999	Adolescence of Utena	Kunihiko Ikuhara	J.C.Staff	No	No	No	Yes		
2007	Kino's Journey: Country of Illness	Ryūtarō Nakamura	Shaft	Yes	Yes	Yes	No		
2013	Puella Magi Madoka Magica: Rebellion	Akiyuki Shinbo; Yukihiro Miyamoto	Shaft	No	No	Yes	Yes		
2017	Kizumonogatari III: Reiketsu	Akiyuki Shinbo; Tatsuya Oishi	Shaft	No	No	No	Yes		
2017	Fireworks	Akiyuki Shinbo; Nobuyuki Takeuchi	Shaft	No	No	No	Yes	2nd key animator	
2026	Puella Magi Madoka Magica: Walpurgisnacht - Rising	Akiyuki Shinbo; Yukihiro Miyamoto	Shaft	No	No	Yes	Yes	Main animator	

== Notes ==
=== Works cited ===
- Misaka, Taiji, ed. (2009). まりあ†ほりっく アニメ公式ガイドブック [Maria Holic Anime Official Guidebook]. Media Factory. ISBN 978-4840129312.
- Shinbo, Akiyuki (2012). 新房語 [Shinbogatari] (in Japanese). Ichijinsha. ISBN 978-4758012591.
