= Kazuya Shiotsuki =

Japanese animator & character designer

Kazuya Shiotsuki 潮月 一也
- Occupations: Animator, character designer
- Years active: 2001–present
- Employer(s): Hadashi Pro (2001~2002); Shaft (2003–present)
- Known for: Gourmet Girl Graffiti; Luminous Witches

Kazuya Shiotsuki (Japanese: 潮月一也, Hepburn: Shiotsuki Kazuya) is a Japanese animator and character designer.

== Career ==
Shiotsuki joined Hadashi Pro in the early 2000s as a rookie in-between animator. Within a few years, he left the studio and joined Shaft around 2003. Initially, Shiotsuki continued with in-between work, but was promoted to key animator within a year; and by 2006, he was doing animation direction work. In 2008, Shiotsuki received his first job as a character designer for one of the Shina Dark music videos. Soon thereafter, he became more involved with Shaft's works as a main staff member taking on a variety of different roles from accessory designer, to chief animation director, and so forth. His first character design work for a televised anime came in 2015 when he designed the characters for Gourmet Girl Graffiti. Shaft president Mitsutoshi Kubota gave Shiotsuki the first three volumes of the manga and asked him to make some drawings from it, and then asked Shiotsuki to draw something like a character chart which he submitted and was adopted by the production.

In 2022, he designed the characters for the Strike Witches spin-off series Luminous Witches, and in 2024 designed the characters for Ninja to Koroshiya no Futarigurashi.

Shiotsuki named Shaft colleague Nobuhiro Sugiyama as a particular influence on his style. Nisekoi's first season, which Sugiyama drew the designs for and acted as chief animation director alongside Shiotsuki, garnered praise from the latter, who described the key visuals and character sheets as "godlike".

== Works ==
=== Teleivison series ===
Year	Title	Director(s)	Studio	CD (Note: Character designer.)	CAD (Note: Chief animation director.)	AD (Note: Animation director.)	KA (Note: Key animator.)	Other roles and notes	Ref(s)
2003	Dear Boys	Susumu Kudou	A.C.G.T	No	No	No	No	In-between animator	
2003	Kino's Journey	Ryūtarō Nakamura	A.C.G.T	No	No	No	No	In-between animator	
2003	Popotan	Shinichiro Kimura	Shaft	No	No	No	Yes	In-between animation check In-between animator	
2003	Gilgamesh	Masahiko Murata	Japan Vistec	No	No	No	No	In-between animator	
2003	Maburaho	Shinichiro Kimura	J.C.Staff	No	No	No	No	In-between animation check	
2004	Misaki Chronicles	Jun Takada; Hiroshi Negishi	Radix	No	No	No	Yes	In-between animation check	
2004	This Ugly yet Beautiful World	Shouji Saeki	Gainax; Shaft	No	No	No	Yes	In-between animation check	
2004	Tetsujin 28-gou	Yasuhiro Imagawa	Palm Studio	No	No	No	Yes	In-between animation inspection In-between animator	
2004	Gakuen Alice	Takahiro Omori	Group TAC	No	No	No	Yes		
2004	Tsukuyomi: Moon Phase	Akiyuki Shinbo	Shaft	No	No	No	Yes	2nd key animator	
2004	Uta Kata	Keiji Gotoh	Hal Film Maker	No	No	No	Yes		
2005	He is My Master	Shouji Saeki	Gainax; Shaft	No	No	No	Yes		
2005	Pani Poni Dash!	Akiyuki Shinbo; Shin Oonuma	Shaft	No	No	No	Yes		
2005	Black Cat	Shin Itagaki	Gonzo	No	No	No	Yes		
2006	REC	Ryūtarō Nakamura	Shaft	No	No	No	Yes		
2006	Negima!?	Akiyuki Shinbo; Shin Oonuma	Shaft	No	No	Yes	Yes	Assistant animation director	
2007	Hidamari Sketch	Akiyuki Shinbo; Ryouki Kamitsubo	Shaft	No	No	Yes	Yes	Assistant animation director	
2007	Sayonara, Zetsubou-Sensei	Akiyuki Shinbo	Shaft	No	No	Yes	Yes	Extra animation Storyboard artist Assistant animation director	
2007	Ef: A Tale of Memories	Shin Oonuma	Shaft	No	No	Yes	Yes		
2008	Zoku Sayonara, Zetsubou-Sensei	Akiyuki Shinbo; Yukihiro Miyamoto	Shaft	No	No	No	Yes		
2008	Hidamari Sketch x 365	Akiyuki Shinbo	Shaft	No	No	Yes	Yes	Assistant animation director 2nd key animator	
2008	Ef: A Tale of Melodies	Shin Oonuma	Shaft	No	No	Yes	Yes		
2009	Natsu no Arashi!	Akiyuki Shinbo; Shin Oonuma	Shaft	No	No	Yes	Yes	Assistant animation director	
2009	Maria Holic	Akiyuki Shinbo; Yukihiro Miyamoto	Shaft	No	No	Yes	No	Assistant animation director	
2009	Bakemonogatari	Akiyuki Shinbo; Tatsuya Oishi	Shaft	No	No	No	No	Assistant animation director	
2009	Zan Sayonara, Zetsubou-Sensei	Akiyuki Shinbo; Yukihiro Miyamoto	Shaft	No	No	Yes	Yes	Assistant animation director	
2009	Natsu no Arashi! Akinai-chuu	Akiyuki Shinbo; Shin Oonuma; Kenichi Ishikura	Shaft	No	No	Yes	Yes	Accessory designer Assistant animation director	
2010	Dance in the Vampire Bund	Akiyuki Shinbo; Masahiro Sonoda	Shaft	No	No	No	Yes	Assistant animation director	
2010	Hidamari Sketch x Hoshimittsu	Akiyuki Shinbo; Kenichi Ishikura	Shaft	No	No	Yes	Yes	Guest clothing designer Assistant animation director	
2010	Arakawa Under the Bridge	Akiyuki Shinbo; Yukihiro Miyamoto	Shaft	No	No	Yes	Yes		
2010	And Yet the Town Moves	Akiyuki Shinbo	Shaft	No	No	Yes	No	2nd key animator	
2011	Puella Magi Madoka Magica	Akiyuki Shinbo; Yukihiro Miyamoto	Shaft	No	No	Yes	Yes	Assistant animation director	
2011	Ground Control to Psychoelectric Girl	Akiyuki Shinbo; Yukihiro Miyamoto	Shaft	No	No	Yes	Yes	Assistant animation director	
2011	Hidamari Sketch x SP	Akiyuki Shinbo	Shaft	No	No	Yes	Yes		
2012	Hidamari Sketch x Honeycomb	Akiyuki Shinbo; Yuki Yase	Shaft	No	No	Yes	Yes	Assistant chief animation director Storyboard artist	
2012	Nisemonogatari	Akiyuki Shinbo; Tomoyuki Itamura	Shaft	No	No	Yes	Yes	2nd key animator	
2013	Monogatari Series Second Season	Akiyuki Shinbo; Tomoyuki Itamura	Shaft	No	No	Yes	Yes		
2014	Nisekoi	Akiyuki Shinbo; Naoyuki Tatsuwa	Shaft	No	Yes	Yes	Yes	Storyboard artist	
2014	Mekakucity Actors	Akiyuki Shinbo; Yuki Yase	Shaft	No	No	No	Yes		
2014	Hanamonogatari	Akiyuki Shinbo; Tomoyuki Itamura	Shaft	No	No	No	Yes		
2015	Gourmet Girl Graffiti	Akiyuki Shinbo; Naoyuki Tatsuwa	Shaft	Yes	Yes	Yes	Yes		
2015	Nisekoi:	Akiyuki Shinbo; Yukihiro Miyamoto	Shaft	No	No	No	Yes	2nd key animator	
2015	Owarimonogatari	Akiyuki Shinbo; Tomoyuki Itamura	Shaft	No	No	Yes	No	Storyboard artist	
2016	March Comes In like a Lion	Akiyuki Shinbo; Kenjirou Okada	Shaft	No	Yes	Yes	Yes	Prop designer Clothing designer 2nd key animator	
2017	March Comes In like a Lion 2nd Season	Akiyuki Shinbo; Kenjirou Okada	Shaft	No	Yes	Yes	Yes	Opening unit director	
2018	Fate/Extra: Last Encore	Akiyuki Shinbo; Yukihiro Miyamoto	Shaft	No	No	Yes	Yes		
2019	Zoku Owarimonogatari	Akiyuki Shinbo	Shaft	No	No	No	Yes		
2019	The Quintessential Quintuplets	Satoshi Kuwabara	Tezuka Productions	No	No	No	Yes		
2020	Assault Lily Bouquet	Shouji Saeki; Hajime Ootani	Shaft	No	Yes	Yes	No	Sub-character designer	
2022	Luminous Witches	Shouji Saeki	Shaft	Yes	Yes	Yes	Yes		
2023	The Café Terrace and Its Goddesses	Satoshi Kuwabara	Tezuka Productions	No	Yes	No	No		
2023	Zom 100: Bucket List of the Dead	Kazuki Kawagoe	Bug Films	No	No	Yes	No		
2023	The Quintessential Quintuplets~	Yukihiro Miyamoto	Shaft	Yes	Yes	Yes	No	Uncredited animation director	
2025	A Ninja and an Assassin Under One Roof	Yukihiro Miyamoto	Shaft	Yes	Yes	Yes	No	Back sponsor illustration	

=== OVAs/ONAs ===
Year	Title	Director(s)	Studio	CD	CAD	AD	KA	Other roles and notes	Ref(s))
2003	Papillon Rose	Shinji Tobita	Studio Kelmadick	No	No	No	No	In-between animator	
2003	Temptation	Juuhachi Minamizawa	Arcturus	No	No	No	No	In-between animator	
2006	Negima: Spring Special	Akiyuki Shinbo; Shin Oonuma	Shaft	No	No	No	Yes		
2008	Shina Dark	Naoyuki Konno; Shinpei Tomooka; Shin Oonuma; Toshimasa Suzuki	Shaft	Yes	Unknown	Unknown	Unknown		
2009	Goku Sayonara, Zetsubou-Sensei	Akiyuki Shinbo; Yukihiro Miyamoto	Shaft	No	No	No	No	Assistant animation director	
2013	Hidamari Sketch: Sae & Hiro's Graduation Arc	Akiyuki Shinbo; Yuki Yase	Shaft	No	No	Yes	Yes	Clothing designer Storyboard artist	
2014	Nisekoi	Akiyuki Shinbo; Naoyuki Tatsuwa	Shaft	No	Yes	No	No		
2015	Magical Suite Prism Nana: I Want to Fulfill My Dreams!? Hope Advancing [Part 1]	Yukihiro Miyamoto	Shaft	Yes	No	Yes	Yes	Art design	
2016	The Beheading Cycle: The Nonsense Bearer and the Blue Savant	Akiyuki Shinbo; Yuki Yase	Shaft	No	No	No	No	Storyboard artist Assistant animation director	
2016	Koyomimonogatari	Akiyuki Shinbo; Tomoyuki Itamura	Shaft	No	No	No	Yes		
2024	Monogatari Series Off & Monster Season	Akiyuki Shinbo; Midori Yoshizawa	Shaft	No	No	Yes	Yes		
2025	Magical Suite Prism Nana: I Want to Fulfill My Dreams!? Hope Advancing [Part 2]	Yukihiro Miyamoto	Shaft	Yes	Yes	Yes	No	Art design	

=== Films ===
Year	Title	Director(s)	Studio	CD	CAD	AD	KA	Other roles and notes	Ref(s)
2007	Kino's Journey: Country of Illness	Ryūtarō Nakamura	Shaft	No	No	No	Yes		
2012	Puella Magi Madoka Magica: Beginnings	Akiyuki Shinbo; Yukihiro Miyamoto	Shaft	No	No	Yes	Yes		
2013	Puella Magi Madoka Magica: Rebellion	Akiyuki Shinbo; Yukihiro Miyamoto	Shaft	No	No	Yes	No		
2017	Fireworks	Akiyuki Shinbo; Nobuyuki Takeuchi	Shaft	No	No	No	Yes		
2026	Puella Magi Madoka Magica: Walpurgisnacht - Rising	Akiyuki Shinbo; Yukihiro Miyamoto	Shaft	No	No	Yes	Yes		

== Notes ==
=== Book citations ===
- Kizawa, Yukito; Nakamoto, Muneo; Yanagi, Yuuichi, eds. (2008). Hidamari Sketch Album. Houbunsha. ISBN 978-4832277403.
- Misaka, Taiji, ed. (2009). まりあ†ほりっく アニメ公式ガイドブック [Maria Holic Anime Official Guidebook]. Media Factory. ISBN 978-4840129312.
- Nakamoto, Muneo; Yamamoto, Yuuko, eds. (2015). 幸腹グラフィティTVアニメ公式ガイドブック Girls&Cooking! [Gourmet Girl Graffiti TV Anime Official Guidebook - Girls & Cooking]. Houbunsha. ISBN 978-4832245853.
