= Nobuyuki Takeuchi =

Japanese animator & director

Nobuyuki Takeuchi 武内 宣之
- Born: February 27, 1967 (age 59); Hyogo Prefecture, Japan
- Occupations: Animator, director, character designer, storyboard artist, production designer
- Years active: 1986–present
- Employer(s): Dragon Production (~1986); Studio Lions (1987~1988); Studio Giants (1989~1992)
- Known for: Fireworks

Nobuyuki Takeuchi (Japanese: 武内宣之, Hepburn: Takeuchi Nobuyuki) is a Japanese animator, director, character designer and production designer. His work with directors Akiyuki Shinbo (and more broadly studio Shaft) and Kunihiko Ikuhara have gained noteworthy fame since the late 1990s and especially through the mid-2000s.

== Career ==
Takeuchi was originally from sub-contracting animation studio Dragon Production, which he belonged to sometime during the mid-1980s. His tenure at the company was relatively short-lived as he transferred to Studio Lions, the in-between division to Studio Giants, soon thereafter; and eventually, he became a part of the larger Studio Giants entity. In the early 1990s, however, Takeuchi went freelance. Around 1994, he was offered a seat as a freelancer at Shaft and started to work on a number of their outsource works and eventually made his debut as an animation director on the studio's first original televised work, Juuni Senshi Bakuretsu Eto Ranger (1995).

In 1997, Takeuchi worked as the animation director for Shaft's outsourced episodes of Revolutionary Girl Utena directed by Kunihiko Ikuhara. Takeuchi's work on the series gained particular interest from Ikuhara, who invited him to work on the succeeding movie as an animation director. Also that year, Takeuchi participated as a character designer for Shaft's Sakura Diaries OVA series. In 1998, studio Radix was set to produce an adaptation of Silent Möbius, but the production ended up being outsourced to Shaft. Chief director Hideki Tonokatsu worked at Shaft, and Shaft became the main production site and also the company responsible for finding the series' staff; and finding interest in Takeuchi's work, saying that Takeuchi had a clear vision and direction, he was given the role of series "animation director" (not referring to the correction of drawings). Takeuchi's work from the series garnered interest from then-managing director of Shaft Mitsutoshi Kubota, who felt that Takeuchi would be a central figure in Shaft's succeeding productions.

For the next several years, Takeuchi continued to freelance as a key animator and animation director across several studios, even doing work for Studio Ghibli, but he gained prominence in 2004 when Shaft teamed up with Akiyuki Shinbo to produce Tsukuyomi: Moon Phase, the start of Shinbo and Shaft's long collaborative history. Shinbo was concerned with having a strong visual foundation for the series, and wanted someone with strong sensibilities for art setting (美術設定) material to work with; however, he did not want someone from a background art studio to take on the role, as was traditional. Kubota, who succeeded Shaft founder Hiroshi Wakao as CEO following Wakao's retirement, recommended Takeuchi to Shinbo, who then took on the role of "visual director". Takeuchi's work on the series, which featured cross-sections of buildings to show their insides, almost like a stage production, inspired Shinbo to use similar techniques on his next work, Pani Poni Dash!, despite Takeuchi not working on the series. However, Takeuchi collaborated more with Shaft in large roles as a production and concept designer in several succeeding works. In 2009, he participated again as a visual director on Shinbo and Tatsuya Oishi's adaptation of Bakemonogatari. Although he didn't continue throughout the rest of the franchise as its visual director, his work became a vital part of its production, and he contributed as an art setting or production designer across all other iterations of the series with the exception of the final two parts, Owarimonogatari II and Zoku Owarimonogatari.

Takeuchi did occasional storyboard work and directing work since Silent Möbius. He storyboarded the first five episodes of Bakemonogatari, and also storyboarded, directed, and did key animating work in Penguindrum episode 9 entirely by himself. In 2017, Takeuchi made his directorial debut anime film adaptation of Shunji Iwai's 1993 live-action film Fireworks, Should We See It from the Side or the Bottom?. He and the film's composer, Satoru Kōsaki, were both longtime fans of Iwai's films. The first film Takeuchi had seen from Iwai was Ghost Soup, and he thought that it was an impressive film. As the film's director, he said he was honored to work with Iwai. In 2019, he chief directed Ikuhara's Sarazanmai, and in 2022 contributed to both of Ikuhara's Re:cycle of the Penguindrum films as their assistant director and Shaft's RWBY: Ice Queendom as its visual director.

== Works ==
=== Teleivison series ===
In "Director(s)" column highlights Takeuchi's directorial works.

Year	Title	Director(s)	Studio	SB (Note: Storyboard artist.)	ED (Note: Episode director, equivalent to unit director.)	AD (Note: Animation director.)	KA (Note: Key animator.)	Other roles and notes	Ref(s)
1986	Machine Robo: Revenge of Cronos	Hiroshi Yoshida	Ashi Productions	No	No	No	No	In-between animator	
1988	Maison Ikkoku (#92)	Naoyuki Yoshinaga	Studio Deen	No	No	No	No	In-between animator	
1994	The Legend of Snow White	Kunitoshi Okajima	Tatsunoko Production	No	No	No	Yes		
1995	Juuni Senshi Bakuretsu Eto Ranger	Kunitoshi Okajima	Shaft	No	No	Yes	Yes		
1997	Revolutionary Girl Utena	Kunihiko Ikuhara	J.C. Staff	No	No	No	Yes		
1997	Hareluya II Boy	Kiyoshi Egami	Triangle Staff	No	No	No	Yes		
1997	Battle Athletes Victory	Katsuhito Akiyama	AIC	No	No	No	Yes		
1997	Berserk	Naohito Takahashi	OLM	No	No	No	Yes		
1997	Burn-Up Excess	Shinichiro Kimura	Magic Bus	No	No	No	Yes		
1998	Silent Möbius	Hideki Tonokatsu	Radix (Shaft)	Yes	No	Yes	Yes	Series animation director	
1998	Generator Gawl	Seiji Mizushima	Tatsunoko Production	No	No	No	Yes		
1999	Dual! Parallel Trouble Adventures	Katsuhito Akiyama	AIC	No	No	No	Yes		
1999	Magic User's Club	Junichi Sato	Madhouse; Triangle Staff	No	No	No	Yes		
2000	Sakura Wars	Ryūtarō Nakamura	Madhouse	Yes	Yes	No	Yes		
2000	Android Kikaider: The Animation	Tensai Okamura	Radix; Studio OX	No	No	No	Yes		
2001	Cyborg 009: The Cyborg Soldier	Jun Kawagoe	Japan Vistec	No	No	No	Yes		
2002	Ai Yori Aoshi	Masami Shimoda	J.C. Staff	No	No	No	Yes		
2002	Mahoromatic: Something More Beautiful	Hiroyuki Yamaga	Gainax; Shaft	No	No	No	Yes		
2003	Heat Guy J	Kazuki Akane	Satelight	No	No	No	Yes		
2004	Tsukuyomi: Moon Phase	Akiyuki Shinbo	Shaft	Yes	Yes	No	Yes	Visual director	
2004	This Ugly yet Beautiful World	Shouji Saeki	Gainax; Shaft	No	No	No	Yes		
2004	Uta Kata	Keiji Gotoh	Hal Film Maker	No	No	No	Yes		
2005	Pani Poni Dash!	Akiyuki Shinbo (chief); Shin Oonuma	Shaft	No	No	No	Yes		
2005	Capeta	Shin Misawa	Studio Comet	Yes	No	No	Yes		
2005	Magical Girl Lyrical Nanoha A's	Keizō Kusakawa	Seven Arcs	Yes	No	No	Yes		
2006	Negima!?	Akiyuki Shinbo; Shin Oonuma (chief)	Shaft	No	No	No	Yes	Production designer	
2006	Kaiketsu Zorori (#93)	Tsutomu Shibayama (chief); Mitsuko Kase	Ajia-do; Sunrise	Yes	No	No	No		
2006	Hanbun no Tsuki ga Noboru Sora	Yukihiro Matsushita	Group TAC	Yes	No	No	No		
2006	Air Gear	Hajime Kamegaki	Toei Animation	Yes	No	No	No		
2006	D.Gray-Man	Osamu Nabeshima	TMS Entertainment	Yes	No	No	No		
2007	Hidamari Sketch	Akiyuki Shinbo (chief); Ryouki Kamitsubo (chief)	Shaft	No	No	No	Yes		
2007	Heroic Age	Takashi Noto (chief); Toshimasa Suzuki	Xebec	Yes	No	No	No		
2007	Magical Girl Lyrical Nanoha Strikers	Keizō Kusakawa	Seven Arcs	Yes	No	No	No		
2008	Ef: A Tale of Melodies	Shin Oonuma	Shaft	Yes	No	No	No		
2009	Tears to Tiara	Tomoki Kobayashi	White Fox	No	No	No	Yes		
2009	Maria Holic	Akiyuki Shinbo; Yukihiro Miyamoto (series)	Shaft	Yes	No	No	Yes	Concept design	
2009	Natsu no Arashi!	Akiyuki Shinbo; Shin Oonuma (series)	Shaft	No	No	No	No	Design works	
2009	Bakemonogatari	Akiyuki Shinbo; Tatsuya Oishi (series)	Shaft	Yes	No	Yes	Yes	Visual director Assistant animation director	
2011	Maria Holic Alive	Akiyuki Shinbo; Tomokazu Tokoro (series)	Shaft	No	No	No	No	Concept design	
2011	Penguindrum	Kunihiko Ikuhara	Brain's Base	Yes	Yes	Yes	Yes	Design assistance	
2012	Nisemonogatari	Akiyuki Shinbo; Tomoyuki Itamura (series)	Shaft	No	No	No	No	Production designer	
2012	Nekomonogatari: Black	Akiyuki Shinbo; Tomoyuki Itamura (series)	Shaft	No	No	No	No	Production designer	
2012	Hidamari Sketch x Honeycomb	Akiyuki Shinbo (chief); Yuki Yase	Shaft	No	No	No	Yes		
2013	Monogatari Series Second Season	Akiyuki Shinbo (chief); Tomoyuki Itamura; Naoyuki Tatsuwa (series, #6–9); Yuki Yase (series, #14–17)	Shaft	No	No	No	No	Production designer	
2014	Hanamonogatari	Akiyuki Shinbo (chief); Tomoyuki Itamura	Shaft	No	No	No	No	Production designer	
2014	Tsukimonogatari	Akiyuki Shinbo (chief); Tomoyuki Itamura	Shaft	No	No	No	No	Production designer	
2015	Owarimonogatari	Akiyuki Shinbo (chief); Tomoyuki Itamura	Shaft	No	No	No	No	Production designer	
2018	Fate/Extra Last Encore	Akiyuki Shinbo (chief); Yukihiro Miyamoto (series)	Shaft	No	No	No	Yes		
2019	Sarazanmai	Kunihiko Ikuhara; Nobuyuki Takeuchi (chief)	Lapin Track; MAPPA	Yes	Yes	Yes	Yes		
2019	The Price of Smiles	Toshimasa Suzuki	Tatsunoko Production	Yes	No	No	Yes		
2020	Magia Record	Doroinu (chief)	Shaft	No	No	No	Yes		
2020	Warlords of Sigrdrifa	Hirotaka Tokuda	A-1 Pictures	No	No	No	Yes		
2022	RWBY: Ice Queendom	Toshimasa Suzuki; Kenjirou Okada (chief)	Shaft	Yes	No	No	Yes	Visual director	
2023	Kawagoe Boys Sing	Jun Matsumoto	evg	Yes	Yes	Yes	Yes		
2024	Shōshimin Series	Mamoru Kanbe	Lapin Track	Yes	Yes	Yes	No	2nd key animator	

=== OVAs/ONAs ===
Year	Title	Director(s)	Studio	KA	Other roles and notes	Ref(s)
1989	Patlabor: Mobile Police (#7)	Naoyuki Yoshinaga	Studio Deen	No	In-between animator	
1990	Gdleen	Toyoo Ashida; Takao Kato	Ashi Productions	Yes		
1992	Sequence	Naohito Takahashi	Ashi Productions	Yes		
1993	Moldiver	Hiroyuki Kitazume; Youei Fujiwara (series)	AIC	Yes		
1994	Super Dimension Century Orguss 02	Fumihiko Takayama	J.C. Staff	Yes		
1994	Homeroom Affairs	Osamu Sekita	J.C. Staff	Yes		
1994	Tenchi Muyo! Ryo-Ohki	Hiroki Hayashi	AIC	Yes		
1995	Future GPX Cyber Formula Zero	Mitsuo Fukuda (chief)	Sunrise	Yes		
1995	Legend of the Galactic Heroes	Noboru Ishiguro (chief); Masatoshi Tahara (series); Keizo Shimizu (animation)		Yes		
1996	Shin Hurricane Polymar	Akiyuki Shinbo	Tatsunoko Production	Yes		
1996	Legend of Crystania: The Chaos Ring	Ryūtarō Nakamura	Triangle Staff	Yes		
1997	Sakura Diaries	Kunitoshi Okajima	Shaft	Yes	Character design Chief animation director Animation director	
2008	Mahō Sensei Negima!: Shiroki Tsubasa Ala Alba (#1)	Akiyuki Shinbo (chief); Hiroaki Tomita	Shaft; Studio Pasotral	No	Assistant animation director	
2016	Kubikiri Cycle: The Beheading Cycle & The Blue Savant	Akiyuki Shinbo (chief); Yuki Yase	Shaft	Yes		
2016	Koyomimonogatari	Akiyuki Shinbo (chief); Tomoyuki Itamura	Shaft	No	Production designer	

=== Films ===
Year	Title	Director(s)	Studio	SB	ED	KA	Other roles and notes	Ref(s)
1998	Spriggan	Hirotsugu Kawasaki	Studio 4°C	No	No	Yes		
1999	Digimon Adventure	Mamoru Hosoda	Toei Animation	No	No	Yes		
1999	Adolescence of Utena	Kunihiko Ikuhara	J.C. Staff	No	No	Yes	Animation director	
2000	Digimon Adventure: Our War Game!	Mamoru Hosoda	Toei Animation	No	No	Yes		
2001	Spirited Away	Hayao Miyazaki	Studio Ghibli	No	No	Yes		
2002	The Cat Returns	Hiroyuki Morita	Studio Ghibli	No	No	Yes		
2003	Nasu: Summer in Andalusia	Kitarō Kōsaka	Madhouse	No	No	Yes		
2004	Howl's Moving Castle	Hayao Miyazaki	Studio Ghibli	No	No	Yes		
2006	Tales from Earthsea	Goro Miyazaki	Studio Ghibli	No	No	Yes		
2007	Kino's Journey: Country of Illness -For You-	Ryūtarō Nakamura	Shaft	No	No	No	Design works	
2008	Ponyo	Hayao Miyazaki	Studio Ghibli	No	No	Yes		
2012	Puella Magi Madoka Magica: Eternal	Akiyuki Shinbo (chief); Yukihiro Miyamoto	Shaft	No	No	Yes		
2016	Kizumonogatari I: Tekketsu	Akiyuki Shinbo (chief); Tatsuya Oishi	Shaft	No	No	No	Art setting	
2016	Kizumonogatari II: Nekketsu	Akiyuki Shinbo (chief); Tatsuya Oishi	Shaft	No	No	No	Art setting	
2017	Kizumonogatari III: Reiketsu	Akiyuki Shinbo (chief); Tatsuya Oishi	Shaft	No	No	No	Art setting	
2017	Fireworks	Akiyuki Shinbo (chief); Nobuyuki Takeuchi	Shaft	Yes	No	No	Art setting Key layout	
2019	Weathering with You	Makoto Shinkai	CoMix Wave Films	No	No	Yes		
2022	Re:cycle of the Penguindrum	Kunihiko Ikuhara	Lapin Track	Yes	Yes	No	Assistant director Hole in the Sky part design Hole in the Sky part layout composition Hole in the Sky part unit direction	
2024	Kizumonogatari: Koyomi Vamp	Tatsuya Oishi	Shaft	No	No	No	Art setting	

== Notes ==
=== Works cited ===
- Shinbo, Akiyuki (2012). 新房語 [Shinbogatari] (in Japanese). Ichijinsha. ISBN 978-4758012591.
- Oota, Keiji; Shaft (August 18, 2017). パンフレット 打ち上げ花火、下から見るか?横から見るか? [Pamphlet: Fireworks, Should We See It from the Side or the Bottom?] (in Japanese). Toho.
- Takahashi, Yumi, ed. (2019). Akiyuki Shimbo x Shaft Chronicle (in Japanese). Dotcom. ISBN 978-4835457017.
