= Yukihiro Miyamoto =

Japanese anime director (born 1977)

Yukihiro Miyamoto 宮本 幸裕
- Born: November 21, 1977 (age 48); Fukuoka Prefecture, Japan
- Education: Yoyogi Animation Academy
- Occupations: Director, storyboard artist
- Years active: 2002–present
- Employer(s): Vega Entertainment (2002–2006); Shaft (2006–present)
- Known for: Arakawa Under the Bridge; Puella Magi Madoka Magica; Fate/Extra Last Encore

Yukihiro Miyamoto (Japanese: 宮本 幸裕, Hepburn: Miyamoto Yukihiro; born November 21, 1977), occasionally nicknamed Otokomatsuri, is a Japanese anime director. He started at animation studio Vega Entertainment, and later joined Shaft. He is best known for directing Puella Magi Madoka Magica and its subsequent film trilogy alongside Akiyuki Shinbo, the latter trilogy which subsequently garnered ¥2 billion, making it a box-office success.

== Early life ==
Miyamoto was interested in anime and manga from a young age and was particularly interested in timing processes regarding characteristics like lip-sync timing or footstep sounds and whether they aligned with the screen images. He was originally interested in becoming a manga artist, but joked that his poor drawing skills and lack of storytelling ideas were an obstacle for him. After high school, he went to a science-based university as per his parents' wishes but found that he still loved animation, so he went to a vocational school, Yoyogi Animation Academy. At vocational school when he was around 22 or 23. Most students at the vocational school had just come out of high school and were in their late teens, while Miyamoto was in his early 20s. There, he had vague aspirations of joining the anime industry, but hadn't put much thought into what goes into anime production and how many people and different departments were involved. It was there that he met Doroinu, a younger student, who would later be one of his collaborators as one-half of Gekidan Inu Curry.

== Career ==
After graduating from vocational school, he joined the anime industry in 2002 as a production manager and assistant director for Vega Entertainment on their adaptation of Leiji Matsumoto's Gun Frontier manga series. In 2003 and 2004, he debuted as an episode director and storyboard artist (respectively) with F-Zero: GP Legend, and started directing Vega's outsourced episodes for Madhouse at the time too.

Around 2006, Miyamoto left Vega and went freelance due to the difficulties of the job. Shaft director Shin Oonuma was looking for an episode director for Negima!? (2006); and Miyamoto's acquaintance from vocational school who worked for Shaft, Zen Nagata, previously asked him to direct for the company. Despite the fact that he left Vega because of the tough work, he described Shaft as an even tougher company and was looking to leave following his work on the first season of Sayonara, Zetsubou-Sensei. Despite this, he stayed after receiving a scolding from a director at another company, and decided that he would rather stick around Shaft than potentially end up at an even tougher company. He studied under director Shin Oonuma for about a year and quickly became a prominent director alongside Akiyuki Shinbo, Oonuma, and Tatsuya Oishi. In 2008, Miyamoto was given the task of chief episode director for (Zoku) Sayonara, Zetsubou-Sensei working alongside assistant director Naoyuki Tatsuwa under Shinbo. Miyamoto brought on Gekidan Inu Curry, a two-member group consisting of animator 2shiorinu and his close friend from vocational school Doroinu, to do one of the opening animations for the third season. He described his role on the series as being like a "handyman" who did miscellaneous tasks like attending art meetings and dubbing sessions when Tatsuwa was unable to, and also was responsible for overseeing and directing some parts to all episodes, including various parts of the openings and endings. Tatsuwa also had Miyamoto check some of his work and issue revisions when possible. Partway through production, Miyamoto lost his house and had to move; and between that time, he stayed and slept at the Shaft office.

In the following years, Miyamoto directed several more series with Shinbo like Maria Holic in 2009 and Arakawa Under the Bridge in 2010 (both with Miyamoto acting as series director); and in 2011, they directed Puella Magi Madoka Magica which became a critical hit and, alongside Bakemonogatari, is considered to be one of the series that pushed the studio into the spotlight. Prior to joining the series' staff, he had known that the project was underway due to seeing the production materials, like Gekidan Inu Curry's production designs, next to the copy machine at the Shaft office while he was working on Arakawa Under the Bridge. Eventually, Miyamoto was given the role of series director again and joined the Madoka Magica project 3–4 months before the series started airing. During this time, Miyamoto also created a "Shaft directing manual" for first-time outside directors and younger staff to help them with directing Madoka and subsequent series with the so-called "Shaft style."

Subsequently, Miyamoto was tasked with directing the series' film trilogy, with Shinbo acting as chief director over the films, and Miyamoto acting as director instead of series director. He wasn't given the job right away, but instead happened to be asked by Shaft president Mitsutoshi Kubota around October 2011 when the two bumped into each other at a convenience store next to the Shaft office one day. Although their credits differed from the TV counterparts, their jobs were essentially the same as before, according to Miyamoto. The first two films were compilations with updated visuals, and the third film was created as a sequel. Miyamoto intended to direct the work as its overall film director without doing unit direction; however, the directors that the staff tried to recruit were busy, and Miyamoto was made to act as a unit director on the film anyway. The only other directors involved to help were unit director Takashi Kawabata and assistant director Hiroyuki Terao, who were recruited due to the fact that it would've been impossible for Miyamoto to finish the film on his own.

In 2018, it was announced that the spin-off Magia Record mobile game would receive an adaptation by the studio; the following year, it was announced that Miyamoto would serve as an assistant director and director alongside Shaft directors Kenjirou Okada, Midori Yoshizawa, Doroinu of Gekidan Inu Curry, with Shinbo serving as an animation supervisor on the project.

In 2023, it was announced that Shinbo and Miyamoto would both return in their respective roles of chief director and director for the fourth Madoka Magica film.

Yoyogi Animation Academy invited him to give a special lecture to students in collaboration with The Quintessential Quintuplets~ in August 2024.

=== Style ===
Miyamoto described himself as being a "heretic" at Shaft—someone who, in a company of many differing and idiosyncratic directors, is only good at doing "plain work", and isn't particularly original or creative. Shinbo described Miyamoto in a similar way, but said that he was more like a professional craftsman who leaves their mark in places that cannot be seen. Miyamoto humorously joked about being a "career director" or a "soldier" who simply follows orders given to him. He said that he does have creative ideas and thoughts regarding the material he works on, but that whether or not he actually implemented any of it was a different matter. Most of the work Miyamoto does of his own volition is changes to colors, timing, and other miscellaneous choices. Due to Miyamoto's meticulous "soldier" stance, Anime Style editor-in-chief Yūichirō Oguro joked that if he wanted to, Miyamoto could go to Studio Ghibli and direct like Hayao Miyazaki. Shaft visual effects artist Motoki Sakai and animator Kazuhiro Oota also both independently compared Miyamoto to a GM from Mobile Suit Gundam. Shinbo said that Miyamoto is a director whose work often exceeds his expectations.

Shinbo himself likes to cut the space between dialogue when characters talk, though he mentioned that Miyamoto seems to cut dialogue pauses more than Shinbo to a point that the silence between characters talking is close to zero. Miyamoto said that it's like characters who have already started thinking of a response to the person who is actively talking, and thus begin speaking either directly after the person talking has stopped or interrupting their speech entirely, and described his fondness over the editing process for dubbing and timing, which he oversees frame-by-frame.

Shaft producer Yasuhiro Okada, who was the animation producer for the Madoka Magica film trilogy, described Miyamoto as being the best director capable of absorbing and expressing Shinbo's flavor.

== Personal life ==
Miyamoto is married and has a child who was born near the end of production of the Kizumonogatari trilogy. When his wife was in labor, Miyamoto was at the hospital and continued to text with Shaft's producers and staff regarding the film; and the director, Tatsuya Oishi, joked that Miyamoto should name them "Nekketsu" (after the second film in the trilogy, which Miyamoto was in charge of as unit director).

== Works ==
=== Television series ===
In "Director(s)" column highlights Miyamoto's directorial works.

Year	Title	Director(s)	Studio	SB (Note: Storyboard artist.)	ED (Note: Episode director, equivalent to unit director.)	Other roles and notes	Ref(s)
2002	Gun Frontier	Sōichirō Zen	Vega Entertainment	No	No	Production assistant Episode director's assistant	
2002	Fortune Dogs	Hiroshi Saitō	Vega Entertainment	No	No	Episode director's assistant	
2003	Mirmo!	Kenichi Kasai	Studio Hibari	No	Yes		
2003	Submarine Super 99	Hiromichi Matano	Vega Entertainment	No	No	Episode director's assistant	
2003	F-Zero: GP Legend	Ami Tomobuki	Ashi Productions	Yes	Yes		
2004	Tenjho Tenge	Toshifumi Kawase	Madhouse	No	Yes		
2004	Monster	Masayuki Kojima	Madhouse	Yes	Yes		
2006	Kiba	Hiroshi Kōjina	Madhouse	Yes	Yes		
2006	Negima!?	Akiyuki Shinbo; Shin Oonuma (series)	Shaft	No	Yes		
2007	Sayonara, Zetsubou-Sensei	Akiyuki Shinbo	Shaft	No	Yes	Extra animator Extra animation director Opening director Ending assistance	
2007	Night Wizard!	Yūsuke Yamamoto	Hal Film Maker	No	Yes		
2008	Hidamari Sketch x 365	Akiyuki Shinbo	Shaft	No	No	Assistant episode director	
2008	(Zoku) Sayonara, Zetsubou-Sensei	Akiyuki Shinbo; Yukihiro Miyamoto (chief episode)	Shaft	Yes	Yes	Opening director	
2009	Maria Holic	Akiyuki Shinbo; Yukihiro Miyamoto (series)	Shaft	No	Yes		
2009	(Zan) Sayonara, Zetsubou-Sensei	Akiyuki Shinbo; Yukihiro Miyamoto (chief episode)	Shaft	No	Yes	Opening director	
2009	Bakemonogatari	Akiyuki Shinbo; Tatsuya Oishi (series)	Shaft	No	Yes		
2010	Arakawa Under the Bridge	Akiyuki Shinbo; Yukihiro Miyamoto (series)	Shaft	No	Yes		
2010	Arakawa Under the Bridge × Bridge	Akiyuki Shinbo; Yukihiro Miyamoto (series)	Shaft	No	Yes		
2010	Hidamari Sketch x Hoshimittsu	Akiyuki Shinbo; Kenichi Ishikura (series)	Shaft	No	Yes	Opening director	
2011	Puella Magi Madoka Magica (Note: Credited as Series Director (シリーズディレクター, Shirīzu Direkutā).)	Akiyuki Shinbo; Yukihiro Miyamoto (series)	Shaft	No	Yes	Assistant opening director	
2011	Ground Control to Psychoelectric Girl	Akiyuki Shinbo (chief); Yukihiro Miyamoto (series)	Shaft	No	Yes		
2011	Hidamari Sketch x SP	Akiyuki Shinbo	Shaft	No	Yes	Opening director Ending director	
2012	Nisemonogatari	Akiyuki Shinbo; Tomoyuki Itamura (series)	Shaft	No	Yes	Assistant ending director	
2012	Hidamari Sketch x Honeycomb	Akiyuki Shinbo; Yuki Yase (series)	Shaft	No	Yes		
2012	Nekomonogatari (Black)	Akiyuki Shinbo (chief); Tomoyuki Itamura	Shaft	No	No	Ending animation	
2013	Monogatari Series Second Season	Akiyuki Shinbo (chief); Tomoyuki Itamura	Shaft	No	No	Ending animation	
2014	Nisekoi	Akiyuki Shinbo (chief); Naoyuki Tatsuwa	Shaft	No	Yes		
2014	Mekakucity Actors	Akiyuki Shinbo (chief); Yuki Yase	Shaft	No	Yes	Assistant episode director	
2014	Hanamonogatari	Akiyuki Shinbo (chief); Tomoyuki Itamura	Shaft	No	Yes		
2014	Tsukimonogatari	Akiyuki Shinbo (chief); Tomoyuki Itamura	Shaft	No	Yes		
2015	Nisekoi:	Akiyuki Shinbo (chief); Yukihiro Miyamoto (chief episode)	Shaft	No	Yes	Opening director	
2015	Gourmet Girl Graffiti	Akiyuki Shinbo (chief); Naoyuki Tatsuwa	Shaft	No	Yes		
2015	Owarimonogatari	Akiyuki Shinbo (chief); Tomoyuki Itamura	Shaft	No	No	Opening director	
2016	March Comes In like a Lion	Akiyuki Shinbo; Kenjirou Okada (series)	Shaft	No	Yes		
2018	Fate/Extra Last Encore	Akiyuki Shinbo (chief); Yukihiro Miyamoto (series)	Shaft	Yes	Yes		
2020	Magia Record: Puella Magi Madoka Magica Side Story	Doroinu (chief); Yukihiro Miyamoto (Note: Credited as Director (ディレクター, Direkutā).); Kenjirou Okada; Midori Yoshizawa	Shaft	Yes	Yes	Director's assistant	
2020	Assault Lily Bouquet	Shouji Saeki; Hajime Ootani (chief episode)	Shaft	No	Yes		
2021	Magia Record: Puella Magi Madoka Magica Side Story - The Eve of Awakening	Doroinu (chief); Yukihiro Miyamoto	Shaft	Yes	Yes		
2021	Pretty Boy Detective Club	Akiyuki Shinbo (chief); Hajime Ootani	Shaft	No	No	Ending director	
2022	Magia Record: Puella Magi Madoka Magica Side Story - Dawn of a Shallow Dream	Doroinu (chief); Yukihiro Miyamoto	Shaft	Yes	Yes		
2022	RWBY: Ice Queendom	Toshimasa Suzuki; Kenjirou Okada (chief)	Shaft	No	Yes		
2022	Luminous Witches	Shouji Saeki	Shaft	No	Yes		
2023	The Quintessential Quintuplets~	Yukihiro Miyamoto	Shaft	No	Yes	Ending director	
2024	Mashle	Tomoya Tanaka	A-1 Pictures	No	Yes		
2024	Monogatari Series: Off & Monster Season	Akiyuki Shinbo (chief); Midori Yoshizawa	Shaft	No	Yes		
2025	A Ninja and an Assassin Under One Roof	Yukihiro Miyamoto	Shaft	Yes	Yes	Assistant ED director	

=== OVAs/ONAs ===
Year	Title	Director(s)	Studio	SB	ED	Other roles and notes	Ref(s)
2008	Mahō Sensei Negima!: Shiroki Tsubasa Ala Alba (#2)	Akiyuki Shinbo (chief); Yukihiro Miyamoto	Shaft; Studio Pastoral	No	No		
2008	(Goku) Sayonara, Zetsubou-Sensei	Akiyuki Shinbo; Yukihiro Miyamoto (chief episode)	Shaft	Yes	Yes		
2009	(Zan) Sayonara, Zetsubou-Sensei Bangaichi	Akiyuki Shinbo; Yukihiro Miyamoto (chief episode)	Shaft	Yes	Yes		
2012	Ground Control to Psychoelectric Girl	Akiyuki Shinbo (chief); Yukihiro Miyamoto (series)	Shaft	No	No		
2012	Kid Icarus (Shaft episodes)	Akiyuki Shinbo	Shaft	No	Yes		
2014	Okitegami Kyouko no Bibouroku x Monogatari	Yukihiro Miyamoto	Shaft	No	Yes	Miyamoto directed the short but is credited as unit director.	
2015	Magical Suite Prism Nana I Want to Fulfill My Dreams!? Hope Advancing (Part 1)	Yukihiro Miyamoto	Shaft	No	No		
2015	Puella Magi Madoka Magica: Concept Movie	Akiyuki Shinbo (chief)	Shaft	No	Yes		
2016	Nisekoi:	Akiyuki Shinbo (chief); Yukihiro Miyamoto (chief episode)	Shaft	No	Yes		
2016	Kakushigoto	Yukihiro Miyamoto	Shaft	No	Yes	Miyamoto directed the short but is credited as unit director.	
2021	Assault Lily Fruits	Shouji Saeki	Shaft	Yes	Yes		
2022	Bakemonogatari	Akiyuki Shinbo	Shaft	No	Yes		
2025	Magical Suite Prism Nana I Want to Fulfill My Dreams!? Hope Advancing (Part 2)	Yukihiro Miyamoto	Shaft	No	Yes		

=== Films ===
Year	Title	Director(s)	Studio	SB	ED	Other roles and notes	Ref(s)
2012	Puella Magi Madoka Magica the Movie: Beginnings	Akiyuki Shinbo (chief); Yukihiro Miyamoto	Shaft	No	Yes		
2012	Puella Magi Madoka Magica the Movie: Eternal	Akiyuki Shinbo (chief); Yukihiro Miyamoto	Shaft	No	Yes		
2013	Puella Magi Madoka Magica the Movie: Rebellion	Akiyuki Shinbo (chief); Yukihiro Miyamoto	Shaft	No	Yes		
2016	Kizumonogatari II: Nekketsu	Akiyuki Shinbo (chief); Tatsuya Oishi	Shaft	No	Yes		
2017	Kizumonogatari III: Reiketsu	Akiyuki Shinbo (chief); Tatsuya Oishi	Shaft	No	Yes		
2017	Fireworks	Akiyuki Shinbo (chief); Nobuyuki Takeuchi	Shaft	No	Yes		
2026	Puella Magi Madoka Magica the Movie: Walpurgisnacht: Rising	Akiyuki Shinbo (chief); Yukihiro Miyamoto	Shaft	No	Yes		

=== Video games ===
Year	Title	Studio	Roles and notes	Ref(s)
2016	Fate/EXTELLA	Shaft	Opening cinematic director	
2017; 2020	Magia Record	Shaft	Transformation sequence director Cutscene director and storyboard artist	

== Notes ==
=== Works cited ===
- Watanabe, Yumiko (2010). 新房監督のアニメ論 「制約は理由にならない」 【前編】 [Director Shinbo's Anime Theory "Restrictions Are Not a Reason" (Part 1)] (in Japanese). ASCII.
- Magica Quartet (2011). 魔法少女まどか☆マギカ公式ガイドブック you are not alone. [Puella Magi Madoka Magica Official Guidebook you are not alone.]. Houbunsha. ISBN 978-4832240612.
- Oguro, Yuuichirou (May 2, 2011). さよなら絶望先生全書(ANIMESTYLE ARCHIVE) [Sayonara, Zetsubou-Sensei Complete ANIMESTYLE ARCHIVE] (in Japanese). Anime Style. ISBN 978-4902948080.
- Shinbo, Akiyuki (July 27, 2012). 新房語 [Shinbogatari] (in Japanese). Ichijinsha. ISBN 978-4758012591.
- Magica Quartet (2013). 劇場版 魔法少女まどか☆マギカ [前編]始まりの物語/[後編]永遠の物語 公式ガイドブック with you. [Puella Magi Madoka Magica The Movie [Part 1] Beginning / [Part 2] Eternal Official Guidebook with you.]. Houbunsha. ISBN 978-4832243323.
- Kizawa, Yukito; Takayama, Atsushi; Saitou, Fusano, eds. (2014). 劇場版魔法やまどかマギカ[新編]叛逆の物語公式ガイドブック only you. [Movie Version Puella Magi Madoka Magica [New Edition] Story of Rebellion Official Guidebook only you.]. Houbunsha. ISBN 978-4832244290.
- Aniplex (2017). Kizumonogatari Part 2: Nekketsu Deluxe Booklet. Aniplex of America.
- Takahashi, Yumi, ed. (2019). Akiyuki Shimbo x Shaft Chronicle (in Japanese). Dotcom. ISBN 978-4835457017.
- Kashimura, Kazuhito, ed. (2026). SCREENα 劇場版『魔法少女まどかマギカ〈ワルプルギスの廻天〉総力特集/超 2026年 10 月号 [Movie Puella Magi Madoka Magica: Walpurgisnacht - Rising | Comprehensive Feature/Super Issue | October 2026]. Japan Print.
