= Marina Kawano =

- 河野 マリナ
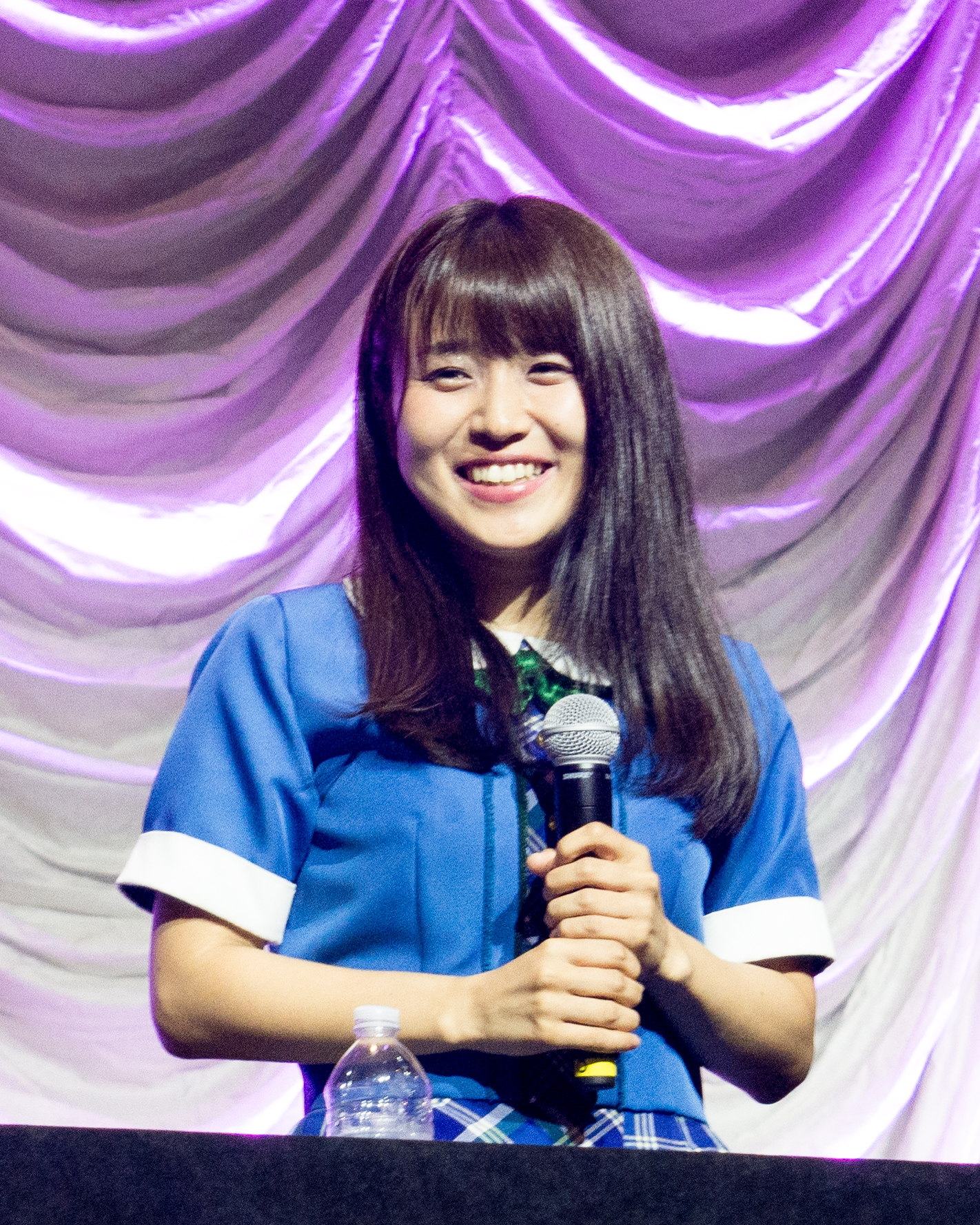
- Marina Kawano at AnimeNEXT 2018
- Born: Marina Kōno; May 21, 1990 (age 36); Kasuga, Fukuoka, Japan
- Education: Kwansei Gakuin University
- Occupation: Singer
- Years active: 2011–present
- Agent: Dearstage
- Height: 148 cm (4 ft 10 in)
- Musical career
- Genres: J-pop
- Instrument: Vocals
- Label: Sony Music Entertainment
- Website: kawanomarina.com

Marina Kawano (河野 マリナ, Kawano Marina; born May 21, 1990) is a Japanese singer from Kasuga, Fukuoka who is signed to SME Records. She started her singing career after winning the 4th Animax All-Japan Anisong Grand Prix in 2010.

== Biography ==
Kawano's interest in music began when she took up piano lessons at the age of 4 under her mother's friend. It was also during this time that she gained an interest in singing. She had her first music recital in junior high school, and started taking guitar lessons in high school. In college, she began singing theme songs from different anime such as Sailor Moon and Slam Dunk in campus events.

Kawano's professional music career began when she won the 4th Animax All-Japan Anisong Grand Prix in 2010, besetting 10,189 other contestants. The following year, she released her first single "Morning Arch", which was used as the opening theme to the anime television series A Channel. Her second single "Takaramono" (たからもの; lit. 'Treasure'), released on February 22, 2012, was used as the ending theme to the fourth season of the anime television series Natsume's Book of Friends. In late 2012, she performed the song "Kieru Daydream" (消えるdaydream; lit. 'Vanishing Daydream'), which was used as the ending theme to the anime television series Nekomonogatari (Kuro). Her third single "Sono Koe o Oboeteru" (その声を覚えてる; lit. 'Remembering Your Voice'), released on October 9, 2013, was used as the second ending theme to the anime television series Monogatari Series Second Season. She later performed the song "snowdrop" with Luna Haruna, which was used as the third ending theme to Monogatari Series Second Season. Kawano released her first album "First Touch" on December 11, 2013.

== Discography ==
=== Singles ===
Release date	Title	Peak Oricon chart position
May 25, 2011	"Morning Arch"	22
February 22, 2012	"Takaramono"	52
October 9, 2013	"Sono Koe o Oboeteru"	15

=== Album ===
Release date	Title	Peak Oricon chart position
December 11, 2013	First Touch	65
