= Mitsutoshi Kubota =

Japanese animation producer

- 久保田 光俊
- Born: 1960 (age 65–66); Kikugawa, Shizuoka Prefecture, Japan
- Occupations: Producer, color designer
- Years active: 1980–present
- Employer: Shaft

Mitsutoshi Kubota (Japanese: 久保田 光俊, Hepburn: Kubota Mitsutoshi) is a Japanese painter, color designer, producer, and the current president of Shaft.

== Career ==
Kubota began his career in the anime industry as a cel painter in the 1980s as a sub-contractor with painting studio Shaft, which had been founded in 1975 by Hiroshi Wakao. The next year, he did his first job as color designer on Hitotsuboshi-ke no Ultra Baasan (1982–1983). From then until 1995, Kubota mainly served as a cel painter, color coordinator, and coloring inspector. In 1995, Kubota moved up to production management, which began with Shaft's first original series: Juuni Senshi Bakuretsu Eto Ranger. He was promoted to managing director of the studio that year. The year after, Kubota and Shaft were approached by Triangle Staff and Ryūtarō Nakamura to produce the second episode of their Legend of Crystania: The Chaos Ring OVA series, which the studio and Kubota accepted the offer to. In 2004, Shaft's founder, Hiroshi Wakao, retired as president of the company and Kubota was chosen to succeed him, with the former staying as a chairman with the studio.

After watching several Akiyuki Shinbo's works as a director, namely The SoulTaker and Le Portrait de Petit Cossette, Kubota invited the former to become a director and mentor with the studio for the purpose of creating a uniquely identifiable brand. Shinbo brought many talents to the studio, such as directors Shin Ōnuma, Tatsuya Oishi, Naoyuki Tatsuwa, and Tomoyuki Itamura, and the studio has since achieved fame for having "arthouse" productions and "striking" visuals throughout the studio's works. In the mid-2000s, following several instances of Triangle Staff and Nakmaura outsourcing episodes of their series to Shaft, Kubota asked Nakamura to direct REC at the studio, which Nakamura agreed to. During production of the series, Kubota was approached to produce a film version of Kino's Journey, which Nakamura had previously directed at Triangle Staff, to which Kubota and Shaft obliged their services.

Kubota remains relatively active in the creative process to Shaft's series. For The Quintessential Quintuplets∽, Kazuya Shiotsuki mentioned that Kubota directly supervised the creation of the key visuals for the work and gave much of his opinion on the colors. Doroinu also mentioned that Kubota came up with the idea of expressing a theme of "connectivity" in the Magia Record anime adaptation. It was also Kubota's idea to change Nagisa Momoe's hair color from blonde to white in Puella Magi Madoka Magica: Rebellion according to Shinbo.

== Works ==
=== Television series ===
Year	Title	Studio	Producer	Planner	Other roles and notes	Ref(s)
1980	Time Bokan Series: Time Patrol Tai Otasukeman	Tatsunoko Production	No	No	Cel painter	
1980	Kaibutsu-kun	Shin-Ei Animation	No	No	Cel painter	
1981	Miss Machiko	Studio Pierrot	No	No	Cel-painting inspector	
1982	Hitotsuboshi-ke no Ultra Baasan	Knack	No	No	Color designer	
1983	Superbook 2	Tatsunoko Production	No	No	Color coordinator	
1983	Serendipity the Pink Dragon	Zuiyo	No	No	Cel painter	
1983	Nine 2	Group TAC	No	No	Cel painter	
1984	Attacker You!	Knack	No	No	Cel-painting inspector	
1985	Touch	Group TAC	No	No	Cel painter	
1987	Mister Ajikko	Sunrise	No	No	Color coordinator	
1988	Osomatsu-kun	Studio Pierrot	No	No	Cel painter	
1988	City Hunter	TMS Entertainment	No	No	Color coordinator	
1989	Blue Blink	Tezuka Productions	No	No	Color coordinator	
1990	Kyatto Ninden Teyandee	Tatsunoko Production	No	No	Color coordinator Special effects	
1991	Oh! My Konbu	Studio Koriumi	No	No	Special effects	
1992	Thumbelina: A Magical Story	Enoki Films	No	No	Special effects	
1994	The Legend of Snow White	Shaft	No	No	Special effects	
1995	Juuni Senshi Bakuretsu Eto Ranger	Shaft	No	No	Production assistant Production manager	
1997	Battle Athletes Victory	AIC	Production producer	No		
1998	Silent Mobius	Radix; Shaft	Production producer	No		
1999	Dual! Parallel Trouble Adventures	AIC	Yes	No		
2000	Dotto Koni-chan	Shaft	Yes	No		
2001	Mahoromatic	Gainax; Shaft	Yes	No		
2002	Mahoromatic: Something More Beautiful	Gainax; Shaft	Yes	No		
2003	Popotan	Shaft	Yes	No		
2004	This Ugly yet Beautiful World	Gainax; Shaft	Animation producer	No		
2004	Tsukuyomi: Moon Phase	Shaft	Animation producer	No		
2005	He is My Master	Shaft	Animation producer	No		
2005	Pani Poni Dash!	Shaft	Animation producer	No		
2006	REC	Shaft	Yes	No		
2006	Negima!?	Shaft	Animation producer	No		
2007	Hidamari Sketch	Shaft	No	Yes		
2007	Sayonara, Zetsubou-Sensei	Shaft	Animation producer	No		
2007	Ef: A Tale of Memories	Shaft	Yes	No		
2008	Zoku Sayonara, Zetsubou-Sensei	Shaft	Animation producer	No		
2008	Hidamari Sketch x 365	Shaft	No	Yes		
2008	Ef: A Tale of Melodies	Shaft	Yes	No		
2009	Maria Holic	Shaft	Animation producer	No		
2009	Natsu no Arashi!	Shaft	Animation producer	No		
2009	Bakemonogatari	Shaft	Yes	No		
2009	Zan, Sayonara Zetsubou-Sensei	Shaft	Animation producer	No		
2009	Natsu no Arashi! Akinai-chuu	Shaft	Animation producer	No		
2010	Dance in the Vampire Bund	Shaft	Animation producer	No		
2010	Hidamari Sketch x Hoshimittsu	Shaft	No	Yes		
2010	Arakawa Under the Bridge	Shaft	Animation producer	No		
2010	And Yet the Town Moves	Shaft	Yes	No		
2011	Puella Magi Madoka Magica	Shaft	No	Yes		
2011	Ground Control to Psychoelectric Girl	Shaft	Animation producer	No		
2011	Maria Holic Alive	Shaft	Animation producer	No		
2011	Hidamari Sketch x SP	Shaft	No	Yes		
2012	Nisemonogatari	Shaft	Yes	No		
2012	Nekomonogatari: Black	Shaft	Yes	No		
2013	Sasami-san@Ganbaranai	Shaft	No	Yes		
2013	Monogatari Series Second Season	Shaft	Yes	No		
2014	Nisekoi	Shaft	Yes	No		
2014	Mekakucity Actors	Shaft	No	Yes		
2014	Hanamonogatari	Shaft	Yes	No		
2014	Tsukimonogatari	Shaft	Yes	No		
2015	Gourmet Girl Graffiti	Shaft	No	Yes		
2015	Nisekoi:	Shaft	Chief producer	No		
2015	Owarimonogatari	Shaft	Yes	No		
2016	March Comes In like a Lion	Shaft	No	Yes		
2017	Owarimonogatari II	Shaft	Yes	No		
2017	March Comes In like a Lion 2nd Season	Shaft	No	Yes		
2018	Fate/Extra: Last Encore	Shaft	No	Yes		
2019	Zoku Owarimonogatari	Shaft	No	Yes		
2020	Magia Record	Shaft	Yes	No		
2020	Assault Lily Bouquet	Shaft	Produce	Yes		
2021	Pretty Boy Detective Club	Shaft	No	Yes		
2021	Magia Record: The Eve of Awakening	Shaft	No	Yes		
2022	Magia Record: Dawn of a Shallow Dream	Shaft	No	Yes		
2022	Luminous Witches	Shaft	No	Yes		
2022	RWBY: Ice Queendom	Shaft	No	No	Planning supervisor	
2023	Zom 100: Bucket List of the Dead	Bug Films	No	No	Production assistance	
2023	The Quintessential Quintuplets∽	Shaft	No	No	Animation supervisor	
2025	A Ninja and an Assassin Under One Roof	Shaft	No	Yes		

=== OVAs/ONAs ===
Year	Title	Studio	Producer	Planner	Other roles and notes	Ref(s)
1987	Yume kara, Samenai	Shaft	No	No	Color coordinator	
1987	Taiman Blues: Naoto Shimizu-hen	Shaft	No	No	Color coordinator	
1991	Legend of Heavenly Sphere Shurato: Dark Genesis	Tatsunoko Production	No	No	Special effects	
1994	Legend of the Galactic Heroes	Kitty Film Mitaka Studio; Magic Bus; Shaft (Note: Kitty Film Mitaka Studio produced the first 86 episodes and was assisted by various studios, one of which was Magic Bus which contracted Shaft for some sub-contracting work. Following the demise of Kitty Films, K-Factory took over production and outsourced all animation to one of four studios, one of which was Shaft. Gaiden was likewise outsourced to Shaft and other studios by K-Factory.)	No	No	Production assistant Production manager Production desk	
1995	Weather Report Girl	Pastel	No	No	Cel painter	
1996	Shadow Skill	Zero-G Room	No	No	Production desk	
1997	Inma Youjo: The Erotic Temptress	Magic Bus	No	No	Production desk	
1997	Legend of Crystania: The Chaos Ring	Triangle Staff	No	No	Production manager	
1997	Sakura Diaries	Shaft	No	No	Production manager	
1998	Legend of the Galactic Heroes Gaiden	Shaft	Production producer	No	Production manager	
2001	Initial D Extra Stage	Pastel	Yes	No		
2001	Kikaider 01: The Animation	Radix; Studio Ox	Line producer	No		
2002	Arcade Gamer Fubuki	Shaft	Animation producer	No		
2006	Negima! Spring	Shaft	Animation producer	No		
2006	Negima! Summer	Shaft	Animation producer	No		
2008	Negima! Shiroki Tsubasa Ala Alba	Shaft	Animation producer	No		
2008	Goku Sayonara, Zetsubou-Sensei	Shaft	Animation producer	No		
2009	Negima! Mou Hitotsu no Sekai	Shaft	Animation producer	No		
2009	Zan Sayonara, Zetsubou-Sensei Bangaichi	Shaft	Animation producer	No		
2011	Katteni Kaizō	Shaft	Animation producer	No		
2012	Palutena's Revolting Dinner	Shaft	Animation producer	No		
2013	Hidamari Sketch: Sae & Hiro's Graduation Arc	Shaft	No	Yes		
2014	Nisekoi	Shaft	Yes	No		
2015	Magical Suite Prism Nana	Shaft	No	Yes		
2016	The Beheading Cycle: The Blue Savant and the Nonsense Bearer	Shaft	No	Yes		
2016	Koyomimonogatari	Shaft	Yes	No		
2019	Ikebukuro PR Anime	Shaft	Yes	No		
2021	Assault Lily Fruits	Shaft	No	Yes		
2024	Monogatari Series Off & Monster Season	Shaft	No	Yes		

=== Films ===
Year	Title	Studio	Producer	Planner	Other roles and notes	Ref(s)
1981	Furiten-kun	Knack	No	No	Cel painter	
1983	Urusei Yatsura 2: Beautiful Dreamer	Studio Pierrot	No	No	Cel painter	
1984	Kakkun Cafe	Osamu Kobayashi	No	No	Color coordinator	
1994	Street Fighter II: The Animated Movie	Group TAC	No	No	Cel painter	
2007	Kino's Journey: Country of Illness	Shaft	Animation producer	No		
2011	Negima! Anime Final	Shaft	Animation producer	No		
2012	Puella Magi Madoka Magica: Beginnings	Shaft	No	Yes		
2012	Puella Magi Madoka Magica: Eternal	Shaft	No	Yes		
2013	Puella Magi Madoka Magica: Rebellion	Shaft	Yes	No		
2016	Kizumonogatari I: Tekketsu	Shaft	Yes	No		
2016	Kizumonogatari II: Nekketsu	Shaft	Yes	No		
2017	Kizumonogatari III: Reiketsu	Shaft	Yes	No		
2017	Fireworks	Shaft	No	No	Production committee	
2022	The Quintessential Quintuplets Movie	Bibury Animation Studios	No	No	Thanks	
2024	Kizumonogatari: Koyomi Vamp	Shaft	No	Yes		
2025	Virgin Punk: Clockwork Girl	Shaft	No	Yes		
2026	Puella Magi Madoka Magica: Walpurgisnacht - Rising	Shaft	No	Yes		

=== Video games ===
Year	Title	Developer	Studio	Roles	Ref(s)
1997	Roommate: Inoue Ryouko	Datam Polystar; Fupac	Shaft	Animation producer	
2001	You're Under Arrest	Hamster Corporation	Shaft	Production manager	
2003	Neon Genesis Evangelion: Girlfriend of Steel 2nd	Gainax	Gainax	Production	
2017	Magia Record	f4samurai	Shaft	Production assistance	
2021	Assault Lily Last Bullet	Pokelabo	Shaft	Executive producer	
2025	Puella Magi Madoka Magica: Magia Exedra	f4samurai Pokelabo	Shaft	Production assistance	

=== Other ===
Year	Title	Roles	Ref(s)
2023	The Quintessential Quintuplets∽ Art Exhibit	Production committee	
2026	SHAFT 50th Anniversary Exhibition	Production committee	

== Notes ==
=== Book citations ===
- Shinbo, Akiyuki (July 27, 2012). 新房語 [Shinbogatari] (in Japanese). Ichijinsha. ISBN 978-4758012591.
- Kizawa, Yukito; Takayama, Atsushi; Saitou, Fusano, eds. (2014). 劇場版魔法やまどかマギカ[新編]叛逆の物語公式ガイドブック only you. [Movie Version Puella Magi Madoka Magica [New Edition] Story of Rebellion Official Guidebook only you.]. Houbunsha. ISBN 978-4832244290.
- Oota, Keiji; Shaft (August 18, 2017). パンフレット 打ち上げ花火、下から見るか?横から見るか? [Pamphlet: Fireworks, Should We See It from the Side or the Bottom?] (in Japanese). Toho.
- Maeda, Hisashi; Nakagami, Yoshikatsu; Kawabata, Takeshi; Nishitani, Nanako (2020). マギアレコード 魔法少女まどか☆マギカ外伝 TVアニメ公式ガイドブック 1巻 [Magia Record Puella Magi Madoka Magica TV Anime Official Guidebook Volume 1] (in Japanese). Houbunsha. ISBN 978-4832272019.
