= Alisa Takigawa =

Japanese singer-songwriter and musician

Alisa Takigawa 瀧川 ありさ
- Born: May 8, 1991 (age 35)
- Origin: Tokyo, Japan
- Occupations: Singer-songwriter; musician
- Instrument: Guitar
- Years active: 2015–present
- Label: SME Records
- Website: www.takigawaalisa.com

Alisa Takigawa (Japanese: 瀧川 ありさ, Hepburn: Takigawa Arisa; born May 8, 1991) is a Japanese musician from Tokyo who is signed to SME Records. She made her music debut in 2015 with the release of her first single "Season", the title track of which was used as an ending theme to the anime series The Seven Deadly Sins. Her music has also been featured in anime series such as Owarimonogatari, All Out!!, and Domestic Girlfriend.

== Biography ==
Takigawa was born in Tokyo on May 8, 1991. Her interest in music began at an early age, when she would sing songs that were being performed on TV, as well as listen to the music of Morning Musume and The Blue Hearts. During her junior high school years, she bought a guitar. She initially aspired to become a drummer, but while a member of her school's light music club, she was encouraged to focus on the guitar instead. She was further inspired to pursue a music career when she watched the Rock in Japan Festival event while in junior high school.

Takigawa would become a part of a band that performed at various events and contests, such as the Senko Riot festival in 2009. It eventually broke up when the other members decided to look for jobs. Following this, she would participate in auditions, in the hopes of becoming a professional musician. Her break came after being scouted by producer Akiyoshi Nishioka, who had been familiar with her since her participation at Senko Riot 2009. She was invited to send a demo to SME Records, not initially intending it to be used as a debut single. As the staff liked it, she was offered a major debut and for the song to be released. That song, "Season", was released as her first single on March 4, 2015; the title song was used as the closing theme for the anime series The Seven Deadly Sins. She would release two more singles that year: "Natsu no Hana" (夏の花) on July 8, and "Sayonara no Yukue" (さよならのゆくえ) on November 18; "Sayonara no Yukue" was used as the closing theme for the anime series Owarimonogatari.

In 2016, Takigawa released two singles: "Again" on April 6 and "Iroasenai hitomi" (色褪せない瞳) on September 7; "Iroasenai hitomi" was used as the closing theme for the anime series The Seven Deadly Sins: Signs of Holy War. She also released her first album At Film on November 2, 2016. She then appeared at Anime Festival Asia Singapore later that month.

From 2017 to 2019, Takigawa made three releases: the singles "No Side/One for You" (ノーサイド/ONE FOR YOU) on February 22, 2017, and "Wagamama" (わがまま) on March 6, 2019, and the mini-album Tokyo (東京) on June 27, 2018.

== Discography ==
=== Singles ===
Title	Peak Oricon position
Season: Release date: March 4, 2015	29
"Natsu no Hana" (夏の花): Release date: July 8, 2015	48
"Sayonara no Yukue" (さよならのゆくえ): Release date: November 18, 2015	23
"Again": Release date: April 6, 2016	35
"Iroasenai hitomi" (色褪せない瞳): Release date: November 18, 2016	34
"No Side/One for You" (ノーサイド/ONE FOR YOU): Release date: February 22, 2017	72
"Wagamama" (わがまま): Release date: March 6, 2019	35

=== Albums ===
Title	Peak Oricon position
at film.: Release date: November 2, 2016	25

=== Mini-albums ===
Title	Peak Oricon position
Tokyo (東京): Release date: June 27, 2018	47
