= Magical Suite Prism Nana =

Japanese ONA series

まじかるすいーと プリズム・ナナ (Majikaru Suīto Purizumu Nana)
- Genre: Magical girl
- Original video animation

Pilot PVs
- Directed by: Yasutoshi Iwasaki (1); Seiya Numata (2); Yukihiro Miyamoto (3, 7); You Miura (4); URA (5); Takuya Iwamoto (6)
- Produced by: Youji Ishizawa
- Music by: Daisy x Daisy
- Studio: Shaft
- Released: August 10, 2012 – April 25, 2013
- Runtime: 1–4 minutes
- Episodes: 7
- Original video animation
- Directed by: Yukihiro Miyamoto (Vol. 1, 4); Seiya Numata (Vol. 2); Hajime Ootani (Vol. 3)
- Produced by: Keiichi Satou
- Written by: Miku Ooshima (Vol. 1, 4); Seiya Numata (Vol. 2); Hajime Ootani (Vol. 3)
- Music by: Daisy x Daisy
- Studio: Shaft
- Released: November 19, 2015 – present
- Runtime: 30–40 minutes
- Episodes: 4

Magical Suite Prism Nana (まじかるすいーと プリズム・ナナ, Majikaru Suīto Purizumu Nana) is a magical girl project created by Shaft. The story revolves around three adolescent girls who transform into the elemental 'Nanas' and fight against monsters. The project was first revealed in 2012, accompanied by a series of animated promotional videos and a pachislot series released by Daxel. A series of original video animation adaptations by Shaft began prescreening in late 2015.

== Characters ==
Itaru Washioka (鷲岡 至, Washioka Itaru) / Heat Nana (ヒートナナ, Hīto Nana)
Voiced by: Suzuko Mimori
The leader who wields the elemental power of fire. Her main weapon is a gauntlet she wears on her left arm. She is a happy-go-lucky girl who wishes to one day go on a rocket into outer space.
Asuka Asagi (浅木 飛鳥, Asagi Asuka) / Earth Nana (アースナナ, Āsu Nana)
Voiced by: Asami Imai
A polite girl who wields the power of earth. Her main weapon is a bow and arrow.
Kotone Oribe (織部 琴音, Oribe Kotone) / Aqua Nana (アクア, Akua Nana)
Voiced by: Eri Kitamura
A shy girl who wields the power of water. Her main weapon is an electric guitar.
Mako Hīragi (柊 マコ, Hīragi Mako) / Lightning Nana (ライトニング, Raitoningu Nana)
Voiced by: Chika Anzai
A girl who wields the power of electricity.

== Production ==
The Prism Nana Project was first announced on August 1, 2012, revealing the project via a booth at Comiket 82 on August 10, 2012, where the first promotional trailer was shown. The series features original character designs by Kantoku, who previously illustrated The "Hentai" Prince and the Stony Cat. light novel series. Seven promotional pilot edition previews were released between September 30, 2012, and April 26, 2013. In July 2015, it was announced that an original video animation by Shaft would be released in late 2015. The project was meant to consist of seven episodes, each by a different director.

== Episodes ==
No.	Title	Directed by	Written by	Storyboarded by	Character designs	Original release date
1 (Volume 1)	"I Want to Fulfill My Dreams!? Hope Advancing [Part 1]"; Transliteration: "Yume Kanaetai...!? Kibō no Advance (Zenpen)" (Japanese: 夢叶えたい...!? 希望のアドバンス［前編］)	Yukihiro Miyamoto	Miku Ooshima	Ryouki Kamitsubo	Kazuya Shiotsuki	November 19, 2015
2 (Volume 2)	"Starry Sky"; Transliteration: "Hoshizora-hen" (Japanese: 星空編)	Seiya Numata	Seiya Numata	Seiya Numata	Rina Iwamoto	April 16, 2016
3 (Volume 4)	"I Want to Fulfill My Dreams!? Hope Advancing [Part 2]"; Transliteration: "Yume Kanaetai...!? Kibō no Advance (Kōhen)" (Japanese: 夢叶えたい…!? 希望のアドバンス（後編）)	Yukihiro Miyamoto, Naoaki Shibuta	Miku Ooshima	Seiya Numata	Kazuya Shiotsuki	October 19, 2025
4 (Volume 3)	"Halloween in a Country of Medals: Noriko and the Fairy"; Transliteration: "Medal no Kuni no Halloween: Noriko to Yousei" (Japanese: メダルの国のハロウィン ~ノリコと妖精~)	Hajime Ootani	Hajime Ootani	Hajime Ootani	Etsuko Sumimoto	January 17, 2026
