= Monogatari (series) =

Japanese light novel series and its franchise

- Cover of the first light novel Bakemonogatari, featuring Hitagi Senjōgahara

物語
- Genre: Mystery; Paranormal; Psychological
- Light novel
- Written by: Nisio Isin
- Illustrated by: Vofan
- Published by: Kodansha
- English publisher: NA: Vertical
- Imprint: Kodansha Box
- Magazine: Mephisto (2005–2006); Pandora (2008); Bessatsu (2013)
- Original run: August 10, 2005 – present
- Volumes: 31
- Anime television series

First Season
- Directed by: Akiyuki Shinbo (Note: "Director" (監督) for episodes 1–26 (Bakemonogatari, Nisemonogatari), and the "chief director" (総監督) for episodes 27–30 (Nekomonogatari (Black)).); Tatsuya Oishi (#1–15) (Note: "Series director" (シリーズディレクター) for Bakemonogatari.); Tomoyuki Itamura (#16–30) (Note: "Series director" for episodes 16–26 (Nisemonogatari), and the "director" for episodes 27–30 (Nekomonogatari (Black)).)
- Produced by: Atsuhiro Iwakami; Mitsutoshi Kubota; Masayuki Haryu (#1–15); Takuya Matsushita (#16–30)
- Written by: Composition: Shaft (Note: Credited under the collective pen name Fuyashi Tō (東富耶子 or 東冨耶子).); Akiyuki Shinbo; Scripts: Yukito Kizawa; Muneo Nakamoto
- Music by: Satoru Kōsaki
- Studio: Shaft
- Licensed by: AUS: Hanabee; NA: Aniplex of America; UK: MVM Films
- Original network: Tokyo MX, MBS, TV Saitama, tvk, TV Aichi, Chiba TV, TVQ Kyushu, TVh, BS Japan
- Original run: 2009–2012: Bakemonogatari: July 3 – September 25, 2009 (TV) November 3, 2009 – June 25, 2010 (ONA) Nisemonogatari: January 8 – March 18, 2012 Nekomonogatari (Black): December 31, 2012
- Episodes: 30
- First Season arcs: 1. Bakemonogatari (15 episodes); 2. Nisemonogatari (11 episodes); 3. Nekomonogatari (Black) (4 episodes)
- Anime television series

Second Season
- Directed by: Akiyuki Shinbo (Note: "Chief director."); Tomoyuki Itamura (Note: "Director."); Naoyuki Tatsuwa (#6–9) (Note: "Series director" for Kabukimonogatari.); Yuki Yase (#14–17) (Note: "Series director" for Koimonogatari.)
- Produced by: Atsuhiro Iwakami; Mitsutoshi Kubota; Takuya Matsushita
- Written by: Composition: Shaft; Akiyuki Shinbo; Scripts: Yukito Kizawa; Muneo Nakamoto
- Music by: Satoru Kōsaki (#1–23); Kei Haneoka (#24–28)
- Studio: Shaft
- Licensed by: AUS: Hanabee; NA: Aniplex of America; UK: MVM Films
- Original network: Tokyo MX, MBS, TV Saitama, tvk, TV Aichi, Chiba TV, TVQ Kyushu, TVh, Tochigi TV, GTV, BS11
- Original run: 2013–2014: Nekomonogatari (White): July 7 – August 4, 2013 Kabukimonogatari: August 18 – September 8, 2013 Otorimonogatari: September 22 – October 13, 2013 Onimonogatari: October 27 – November 17, 2013 Koimonogatari: November 24 – December 29, 2013 Hanamonogatari: August 16, 2014
- Episodes: 28
- Second Season arcs: 1. Nekomonogatari (White) (5 episodes); 2. Kabukimonogatari (4 episodes); 3. Hanamonogatari (5 episodes); 4. Otorimonogatari (4 episodes); 5. Onimonogatari (4 episodes); 6. Koimonogatari (6 episodes)
- Anime television series

Final Season
- Directed by: Akiyuki Shinbo (Note: "Chief director" for episodes 1–36 (Tsukimonogatari, Owarimonogatari, and Koyomimonogatari), and "director" for episodes 37–42 (Zoku Owarimonogatari).); Tomoyuki Itamura (#1–36) (Note: "Director" for Tsukimonogatari, Owarimonogatari, and Koyomimonogatari.)
- Produced by: Takuya Matsushita; Atsuhiro Iwakami (#1–36); Mitsutoshi Kubota (#1–36); Tatsuya Ishikawa (#37–42); Kazuki Sōmiya (#37–42); Tomoki Yunoguchi (#37–42)
- Written by: Composition: Shaft; Akiyuki Shinbo; Scripts: Yukito Kizawa; Muneo Nakamoto
- Music by: Kei Haneoka (#1–17, 29–42); Satoru Kōsaki (#18–28)
- Studio: Shaft
- Licensed by: AUS: Hanabee; NA: Aniplex of America; UK: MVM Films
- Original network: Tokyo MX, MBS, TV Saitama, tvk, TV Aichi, Chiba TV, TVQ Kyushu, TVh, Tochigi TV, GTV, BS11
- Original run: 2014–2019: Tsukimonogatari: December 31, 2014 Owarimonogatari I: October 3 – December 19, 2015 Koyomimonogatari: January 10 – March 27, 2016 (ONA) Owarimonogatari II: August 12–13, 2017 Zoku Owarimonogatari: May 18 – June 22, 2019
- Episodes: 42
- Final Season arcs: 1. Tsukimonogatari (4 episodes); 2. Owarimonogatari I (13 episodes); 3. Koyomimonogatari (12 episodes); 4. Owarimonogatari II (7 episodes); 5. Zoku Owarimonogatari (6 episodes)
- Original net animation

Off & Monster Season
- Directed by: Akiyuki Shinbo (Note: "Chief director."); Midori Yoshizawa
- Produced by: Akiko Yodo; Tatsuya Ishikawa; Yoshiyuki Shioya; Maho Nishibe
- Written by: Composition: Shaft; Akiyuki Shinbo; Scripts: Miku Ōshima
- Music by: Satoru Kōsaki (#1–6); Yuria Miyazono (#6.5); Kei Haneoka (#7–14)
- Studio: Shaft
- Licensed by: Crunchyroll
- Released: 2024–2026: Orokamonogatari: July 6, 2024 ("Tsukihi Undo") Nademonogatari: July 13 – August 10, 2024 Wazamonogatari: August 17, 2024 ("The Beautiful Princess") August 24–31, 2024 ("Acerola Bon Appétit") Shinobumonogatari: September 14 – October 19, 2024
- Episodes: 14
- Related media
- Hyakumonogatari (audio drama); Bakemonogatari Portable (video game); Kizumonogatari (anime film series); Bakemonogatari (manga adaptation)
- icon

Monogatari (物語; "Story") is a Japanese light novel series written by Nisio Isin and illustrated by Vofan. The story follows Koyomi Araragi, a third-year high school student who survives a vampire attack and finds himself helping girls affected by various supernatural phenomena that act as proxies for their emotional and mental issues. Since November 2006, Kodansha published 31 volumes in the series under its Kodansha Box imprint. All of the series' story arcs share the common title suffix -monogatari (物語).

Shaft has animated the Monogatari series several times since 2009. The "first season" of the anime adaptation consists of 30 episodes, which were broadcast in Japan between July 2009 and December 2012. The second season consists of 28 episodes broadcast between July and December 2013, and the "final season" consists of 42 episodes broadcast between December 2014 and June 2019. A prequel anime film trilogy, Kizumonogatari, was released in 2016 and 2017. An anime adaptation of the "Off Season" and "Monster Season" novels aired from July to October 2024. A manga adaptation, illustrated by Oh! great and titled Bakemonogatari, was serialized in Kodansha's Weekly Shōnen Magazine from March 2018 to March 2023.

== Synopsis ==
=== Setting ===
Most heroines have an item that symbolizes their spectres, such as Hitagi's stapler (the claw of a crab), Mayoi's backpack (the shell of a snail), Suruga's arm (the arm of a monkey), Nadeko's hat and jacket (the head and skin of a snake), and Karen's black and yellow tracksuit (the colors of a bee). Although it incorporates elements of fantasy, horror, and action, the series primarily focuses on relationships and conversations between its characters, which make heavy use of Nisio Isin's signature wordplay and metahumor.

=== Premise ===
The Monogatari series revolves around Koyomi Araragi, a third-year high school student who has almost restored his humanity after briefly becoming a vampire during spring break. One day, a classmate of his, the reclusive Hitagi Senjōgahara, falls down a flight of stairs at school into Koyomi's arms. To his surprise, he discovers that Hitagi weighs almost nothing, in defiance of physics. Despite being threatened to keep away, Koyomi offers his help and introduces her to Meme Oshino, a strange middle-aged man living in an abandoned cram school who helped reverse his vampirism. Once Koyomi helps solve Hitagi's problem, she decides to become his girlfriend.

As the series progresses, Koyomi finds himself involved with other girls afflicted by "oddities" (怪異, kaii; lit. "strangeness"): a child named Mayoi Hachikuji; his underclassman Suruga Kanbaru; Nadeko Sengoku, a friend of his sisters; his classmate Tsubasa Hanekawa; and his own younger sisters Karen and Tsukihi. To deal with the apparitions, which feed on human emotions and often take forms symbolically represented by animals, Koyomi relies on supernatural guidance from Oshino and, later, from Shinobu, the once-powerful blonde vampire who attacked him and later assumed the appearance of an eight-year-old girl.

== Production ==
As Nisio Isin's previous work, the Zaregoto series, had been accepted as a light novel, he decided to write the first Monogatari short story, "Hitagi Crab", with a more formal approach in mind. It was not a simple transition from light novels to formal literature, but rather an experiment to see if he could write a light novel without illustrations. However, by the series' third story, "Suruga Monkey", it was decided that illustrations would be included in publication, and he changed his approach accordingly. He has stated that the atmosphere between Kizumonogatari and Nisemonogatari differed due to his knowledge that the latter would be adapted as an anime.

== Media ==
=== Light novels ===
The Monogatari series was first written by Nisio Isin as a series of short stories without illustrations for Kodansha's literary magazine Mephisto. The first three stories were printed in the magazine's September 2005, January 2006, and May 2006 issues, respectively; they were later collected in a light novel volume entitled Bakemonogatari (化物語; "Monster Tale", lit. 'Monstory') on November 1, 2006. A second volume of Bakemonogatari, containing two new chapters, was released in December 2006. Both volumes were published under the Kodansha Box imprint and featured original art by Taiwanese illustrator Vofan, who would illustrate all following releases.

A prequel story to Bakemonogatari entitled "Koyomi Vamp" (こよみヴァンプ, Koyomi Vanpu) was published in the February 2008 issue of Pandora magazine. It was later released as a light novel volume entitled Kizumonogatari (傷物語; "Scar Story") in May 2008. The next story arc, Nisemonogatari (偽物語; "Fake Story"), was released as two volumes in September 2008 and June 2009. The first volume of Nekomonogatari (猫物語; "Cat Story"), subtitled Kuro (黒; "Black"), was released in July 2010, and consists of a prequel story to Bakemonogatari entitled "Tsubasa Family" (つばさファミリー, Tsubasa Famirī).

The second Monogatari saga, referred to as the "Second Season", released between 2010 and 2011, delves further into Koyomi's relationship with each of the heroines. The second volume of Nekomonogatari, subtitled Shiro (白; "White"), was released in October 2010. It was followed by five story arcs published in five volumes: Kabukimonogatari (傾物語; "Slope Story") in December 2010, Hanamonogatari (花物語; "Flower Story") in March 2011, Otorimonogatari (囮物語; "Decoy Story") in June 2011, Onimonogatari (鬼物語; "Demon Story") in September 2011, and Koimonogatari (恋物語; "Love Story") in December 2011.

The third Monogatari saga, referred to as the "Final Season", released between 2012 and 2014, deepens the history of the character Ōgi Oshino, a supposed relative of Meme Oshino. It is composed of four story arcs published in six volumes: Tsukimonogatari (憑物語; "Possess Story") in September 2012, a collection of 12 short stories entitled Koyomimonogatari (暦物語; "Calendar Story") in May 2013, three volumes of Owarimonogatari (終物語; "End Story") in October 2013, January 2014, and April 2014, and Zoku Owarimonogatari (続・終物語; "Continued End Story") in September 2014.

The fourth Monogatari saga, referred to as "Off Season", released between 2015 and 2017, contains side stories focusing on various characters. It is composed of four story arcs published in four volumes: Orokamonogatari (愚物語; "Fool Story") in October 2015, Wazamonogatari (業物語; "Karma Story") in January 2016, Nademonogatari (撫物語; "Nadeko Story") in July 2016, and Musubimonogatari (結物語; "Last Story") in January 2017.

The fifth Monogatari saga, referred to as "Monster Season", released between 2017 and 2021, follows Koyomi's life as a university student. It is composed of six story arcs published in six volumes: Shinobumonogatari (忍物語; "Endure Story") in July 2017, Yoimonogatari (宵物語; "Evening Story") in June 2018, Amarimonogatari (余物語; "Surplus Story") in April 2019, Ōgimonogatari (扇物語; "Fan Story") in October 2020, and two volumes of Shinomonogatari (死物語; "Death Story") in August 2021.

The sixth Monogatari saga, referred to as "Family Season", began in 2023. So far, three volumes have been published: Ikusamonogatari (戦物語; "War Story") in May 2023, Tsugimonogatari (接物語; "Connecting Story") in October 2025, and Torimonogatari (鳥物語; "Bird Story") in September 2026. Tsugimonogatari had initially been announced for release in 2015, as part of Off Season. A further novel has been announced, Ootorimonogatari (鳳物語; "Phoenix Story"), with no release date given yet.

In 2015, Vertical licensed the novel series for English release. The company began its paperback line with Kizumonogatari on December 15, 2015, and later released the Bakemonogatari novels in three volumes: the first in December 2016, the second in February 2017, and the third in April 2017. As of December 2020, the novels in the series up to Zoku Owarimonogatari have been translated.

The English audiobook version of Kizumonogatari was released on May 25, 2016, by Bang Zoom! Entertainment with narration done by Keith Silverstein, Eric Kimerer, and Cristina Vee. The audiobook for Nekomonogatari (White) was released on April 9, 2019, with narration done by Cristina Vee, Eric Kimerer, and Erica Mendez. The audiobook for the three volumes of Bakemonogatari was released on March 24, 2020, with narration done by Eric Kimerer, Cristina Vee, Erica Mendez, and Keith Silverstein.

The Japanese audiobook version of the entire series began release by Kodansha via Audible on February 17, 2021. Each novel features narration by the voice actors/actresses of the anime adaptation. It released one novel each month until June 16, 2023, with the second volume of Shinomonogatari.

=== Anime ===
An anime adaptation of Bakemonogatari was announced in April 2008, and broadcast between July 3 and September 25, 2009, on Tokyo MX. The 15-episode series was animated by Shaft and directed by Akiyuki Shinbo and series director Tatsuya Oishi, with series composition by Shinbo and Shaft staff under the collective pen name of Fuyashi Tō, character designs by Akio Watanabe based on Vofan's original concepts, and scripts edited by Yukito Kizawa and Muneo Nakamoto. The music for the series was composed by Satoru Kōsaki. Only the first 12 episodes were broadcast on television; the remaining three episodes were distributed on the anime's website between November 3, 2009, and June 25, 2010. At Sakura-Con 2012, Aniplex of America announced that it had acquired Bakemonogatari for release in North America. All 15 episodes were released on Blu-ray with English subtitles on November 20, 2012.

An 11-episode anime adaptation of Nisemonogatari aired from January 8 to March 18, 2012, produced by the same staff as Bakemonogatari, but with Tomoyuki Itamura replacing Tatsuya Oishi as director. A four-episode anime television series adaptation of Nekomonogatari (Kuro) (猫物語(黒); "Cat Story (Black)") aired back-to-back on December 31, 2012. Two Blu-ray and DVD compilation volumes were released: the first on March 6, 2013, and the second on April 3, 2013. A 26-episode anime television series titled Monogatari Series Second Season, spanning five of the six novels from Nekomonogatari (Shiro) (猫物語(白); "Cat Story (White)") to Koimonogatari, aired between July 7 and December 29, 2013. Aniplex USA later released the Blu-ray on April 22, and June 24, 2014. Kabukimonogatari and Onimonogatari featured Naoyuki Tatsuwa and Yuki Yase as series directors for those respective arcs under Itamura and Shinbo. Five episodes of the Second Season, adapting the Hanamonogatari story arc from the novels, were delayed from the original broadcast due to production issues and aired as a marathon on August 16, 2014.

A four-episode adaptation of the first novel of the third series, Tsukimonogatari, aired in a marathon on December 31, 2014. A 13-episode anime television series adapting two more novels of the third series, titled Owarimonogatari, aired between October 3 and December 19, 2015. A series of three films adapting the prequel novel Kizumonogatari were produced, with the first one, Kizumonogatari Part 1: Tekketsu, premiering on January 8, 2016, the second film, Kizumonogatari Part 2: Nekketsu, premiering on August 19, 2016, and the third and final film, Kizumonogatari Part 3: Reiketsu, premiering on January 6, 2017. A web anime series adapting Koyomimonogatari became available for download on the App Store and Google Play from January 9, 2016. A seven-episode anime television series, an adaptation of the third Owarimonogatari novel, aired on August 12 and 13, 2017. An adaptation of Zoku Owarimonogatari was released in theaters on November 10, 2018 and as two Blu-ray and DVD volumes on February 27, 2019, and March 27, 2019. It aired on TV as six episodes between May 18 and June 22, 2019.

In January 2024, an adaptation of both "Off Season" and "Monster Season" was announced, with chief director Shinbo, character designer Watanabe, and studio Shaft returning. Midori Yoshizawa is directing. It aired on Abema from July 6 to October 19, 2024. Crunchyroll licensed the series. New episodes of Off & Monster Season were announced in July 2025. In July 2026, Studio Shaft announced that the second set of episodes would begin airing in winter 2026.

The anime adaptation does not follow the order of the novels. Kizumonogatari was planned to be released in 2012 after Bakemonogatari, but due to production issues, it was delayed until 2016. Hanamonogatari was originally planned to be animated in its original place from the novels, but it got postponed to air after Monogatari Series Second Season. In the Blu-ray box set of Monogatari Series Second Season though, Hanamonogatari is listed as the third arc. Koyomimonogatari in the novels was released before Owarimonogatari, but in the anime adaptation, it was released on the App Store and Google Play app after Kizumonogatari I and Owarimonogatari.

=== Music ===
The several opening themes were written by Meg Rock and composed by Satoru Kōsaki and Mito, featuring vocals of the main characters. The ending theme for Bakemonogatari, "Kimi no Shiranai Monogatari" (君の知らない物語; lit. "The Story You Don't Know"), was produced by Supercell and released on August 12, 2009, featuring vocals Nagi Yanagi, and peaked at No. 5 in the Oricon singles charts. The ending theme for Nisemonogatari is "Naisho no Hanashi" (ナイショの話; lit. "Secret Story") sung by ClariS and written by Ryo of Supercell. The ending theme for Nekomonogatari (Black) is "Kieru Daydream" (消えるdaydream; lit. "Vanishing Daydream"), written by Saori Kodama, composed by Satoru Kōsaki and performed by Marina Kawano. Monogatari Series Second Season features four ending songs: "Ai o Utae" (アイヲウタエ; lit. "Sing of Love"), produced by Jin (Shizen no Teki-P) and performed by Luna Haruna for Nekomonogatari (White) and Kabukimonogatari; "Sono Koe o Oboeteru" (その声を覚えてる; lit. "Remembering Your Voice") by Kawano for Otorimonogatari and Onimonogatari; "snowdrop" by both Haruna and Kawano for Koimonogatari; and "Hanaato -Shirushi-" (花痕 -shirushi-) by Kawano for Hanamonogatari. Monogatari Series Final Season features five ending songs: "Border" by ClariS for Tsukimonogatari, "Sayonara no Yukue" (さよならのゆくえ; lit. "Future of Goodbye") by Alisa Takigawa for the first season of Owarimonogatari, "whiz" by TrySail for Koyomimonogatari, "Shiori" by ClariS for the second season of Owarimonogatari, and "azure" by TrySail for Zoku Owarimonogatari. The ending theme song for Monogatari Series Off & Monster Season is "Undead" by Yoasobi.

==== Utamonogatari ====
The collection of theme songs, Utamonogatari (歌物語), released on January 6, 2016, ranked at No. 1 on Oricon's weekly album chart at the time selling over 66,000 copies. It was the fifth anime theme song collection to top the Oricon's weekly album chart since 2010's One Piece Memorial Best album. It also sold over 100,000 copies and was certified as a Gold Disc by Japan Record Association. Disc 1 features the opening and ending themes for Monogatari First Season: Bakemonogatari, Nisemonogatari, and Nekomonogatari (Black). Disc 2 features the opening and ending themes for Monogatari Second Season: Nekomonogatari (White), Kabukimonogatari, Hanamonogatari, Otorimonogatari, Onimonogatari, and Koimonogatari.

Disc 1
No.	Title	Vocals	Length
1.	"staple stable"	Chiwa Saitō	4:33
2.	"Kaerimichi"	Emiri Katō	4:04
3.	"Ambivalent World"	Miyuki Sawashiro	4:15
4.	"Ren'ai Circulation" (恋愛サーキュレーション)	Kana Hanazawa	4:12
5.	"Sugar Sweet Nightmare"	Yui Horie	4:27
6.	"Kimi no Shiranai Monogatari" (君の知らない物語)	Nagi Yanagi	5:40
7.	"Futakotome" (二言目)	Chiwa Saitō	4:23
8.	"Marshmallow Justice"	Eri Kitamura	4:13
9.	"Platinum Disco" (白金ディスコ)	Yuka Iguchi	4:14
10.	"Naisho no Hanashi" (ナイショの話)	ClariS	4:19
11.	"perfect slumbers"	Yui Horie	4:26
12.	"Kieru daydream" (消えるdaydream)	Marina Kawano	4:38
Total length:			53:24

Disc 2
No.	Title	Vocals	Length
1.	"chocolate insomnia"	Yui Horie	4:36
2.	"happy bite"	Emiri Katō	4:09
3.	"Ai o Utae" (アイヲウタエ)	Luna Haruna	4:09
4.	"the last day of my adolescence"	Miyuki Sawashiro	4:22
5.	"Hana Ato -shirushi-" (花痕 -shirushi-)	Marina Kawano	4:30
6.	"Mōsō♡Express" (もうそう♡えくすぷれす)	Kana Hanazawa	4:21
7.	"White Lies"		3:23
8.	"Sono Koe o Oboeteru" (その声を覚えてる)	Marina Kawano	4:06
9.	"fast love"	Chiwa Saitō	4:35
10.	"Kogarashi Sentiment" (木枯らしセンティメント)	Chiwa Saitō and Shin-ichiro Miki	4:35
11.	"snowdrop"	Luna Haruna × Marina Kawano	5:09
Total length:			47:56

==== Utamonogatari 2 ====
The second collection of theme songs, Utamonogatari 2 (歌物語2), released on May 10, 2019, sold over 16,000 copies in its first week and was ranked at No. 1 on Oricon's weekly album chart. It feature the opening and ending themes of Monogatari Final Season: Tsukimonogatari, Owarimonogatari I and II, and Zoku Owarimonogatari. It also feature the ending theme of Koyomimonogatari, the two ending themes of the Kizumonogatari's trilogy and the opening theme for the mobile game PucPuc.

Disc 1
No.	Title	Vocals	Length
1.	"Orange Mint" (オレンジミント)	Saori Hayami	4:34
2.	"border"	ClariS	4:26
3.	"decent black"	Kaori Mizuhashi	4:39
4.	"mathemagics"	Marina Inoue	4:04
5.	"Yūritsu Hōteishiki" (夕立方程式)	Marina Inoue	4:41
6.	"mein schatz"		4:04
7.	"Sayonara no Yukue" (さよならのゆくえ)	Alisa Takigawa	3:58
8.	"terminal terminal"	Emiri Katō	4:29
9.	"dreamy date drive"	Chiwa Saitō	4:42
10.	"dark cherry mystery"	Kaori Mizuhashi	3:51
11.	"SHIORI"	ClariS	4:11
12.	"07734"	Hiroshi Kamiya	3:46
13.	"azure"	TrySail	4:27
14.	"whiz"	TrySail	4:27
15.	"étoile et toi [édition le bleu]"	Clémentine	5:53
16.	"étoile et toi [édition le blanc]"	Clémentine ＆ Ainhoa	5:58
17.	"wicked prince"	princess à la mode	3:57
Total length:			76:07

=== Manga ===
A manga adaptation of the series, illustrated by Oh! great, started in Kodansha's magazine Weekly Shōnen Magazine on March 14, 2018. Vertical began releasing the manga in North America in October 2019. The manga concluded on March 15, 2023, and released its 22nd and final tankōbon volume in Japan on May 17. The final English-language volume was released on August 20, 2024.

=== Other media ===
A drama CD titled Original Drama CD Hyakumonogatari (オリジナルドラマCD 佰物語, Orijinaru Dorama Shīdi Hyakumonogatari), a reference to the parlor game Hyakumonogatari Kaidankai, was released on August 3, 2009. The script was written by Nisio Isin and is bundled with the CD. A PlayStation Portable visual novel titled Bakemonogatari Portable (化物語 ポータブル) developed by Bandai Namco Games was released on August 23, 2012.

Good Smile Company has made several nendoroid petit figures for the series, releasing them as separate sets. The first set contains the characters Koyomi Araragi, Hitagi Senjōgahara and Tsubasa Hanekawa. The second set contains Suruga Kanbaru, Mayoi Hachikuji and Nadeko Sengoku and the third set contains the Araragi sisters Karen and Tsukihi, as well as Shinobu Oshino. The company also made a line of separate, 1/8 scale figures of Hitagi Senjōgahara, Suruga Kanbaru, Nadeko Sengoku, Tsubasa Hanekawa, Mayoi Hachikuji, Karen Araragi, Tsukihi Araragi, Shinobu Oshino, Kiss-Shot Acerola-Orion Heart-Under-Blade (from Kizumonogatari), Nadeko Sengoku in her Medusa form, and Yotsugi Ononoki. They have also made figma figures of several of the characters: Koyomi Araragi, Hitagi Senjōgahara, Mayoi Hachikuji, Suruga Kanbaru, Nadeko Sengoku, and Tsubasa Hanekawa. They have planned to make the Araragi sisters, Karen and Tsukihi. Alter, Bandai, Kotobukiya, and others have made figures of some of the other characters as well.

== Reception ==
The light novel series ranked sixth in the 2009 issue of the light novel guidebook Kono Light Novel ga Sugoi! published by Takarajimasha. It later went on to rank as high as second in 2010, and 2017 issues, with the latter in the tankōbon category. In the 2019 issue, in the tankōbon category, the series ranked third. In the 2020 issue it was revealed the top 10 light novels of the past decade, and the series ranked in the 10th place. Koyomi Araragi ranked sixth in the Best Male Character in 2009, second in 2010, seventh in 2011, third in 2012, and sixth in 2013. Meanwhile, Hitagi Senjōgahara ranked seventh in the Best Female Character in 2009, fourth in 2010, eighth in 2011, and seventh in 2012.

The anime adaptation won the Users' Special Award in the 2nd annual DEG Japan Awards/Blu-ray Prizes. Over one million DVDs and BDs of Bakemonogatari and Nisemonogatari have been sold combined as of September 2012. Across its 27 volumes, the series has sold over two million DVDs and BDs as of October 2015. The Tokyo Anime Award held in 2017 selected Bakemonogatari as the best anime released in 2009.

Barbara Greene in her article "Haunted Psychologies: The Specter of Postmodern Trauma in Bakemonogatari" states that the series critiques otaku consumption and the objectification inherent in consumer capitalism, using its fragmented narrative and visual style to reflect the collapse of traditional narratives in postmodernity. Otaku are drawn to moe-kyara, stylized characters that allow for personal meaning-making, but this consumption ultimately perpetuates a cycle of suffering without resolution. She concludes saying that Bakemonogatari portrays a world where meaning is constructed but never truly fulfilled, serving as both a product of and a commentary on the traumas of postmodern consumer culture.

Christopher Smith's article "The Text Inside Us: Text on Screen and the Intertextual Self in Bakemonogatari" examines how the anime Bakemonogatari uses disruptive on-screen text to create a Brechtian alienation effect, emphasizing the intertextual nature of the characters' thoughts, memories, and desires. By employing archaic Japanese orthography and integrating text deeply into the narrative, the anime not only highlights the constructedness of its story but also situates its themes within Japan's modern historical context. Smith argues that Bakemonogatari serves as a self-reflexive commentary on subjectivity in the postmodern world, suggesting that identity is not an authentic, isolated construct but rather an intertextual creation shaped by social and historical forces.
