= Hidamari Sketch =

Japanese manga series

- First tankōbon volume cover, featuring Yuno

ひだまりスケッチ (Hidamari Suketchi)
- Genre: Comedy; Slice of life
- Created by: Ume Aoki
- Manga
- Written by: Ume Aoki
- Published by: Houbunsha
- English publisher: NA: Yen Press
- Magazine: Manga Time Kirara Carat
- Original run: February 28, 2004 – present
- Volumes: 10
- Anime television series
- Directed by: Akiyuki Shinbo (Note: Credited as Chief Director (総監督, Sō Kantoku)); Ryouki Kamitsubo (TV) (Note: Credited as Chief Director (チーフディレクター, Chīfu Direkutā)); Masayuki Iimura (S1)
- Produced by: Atsuhiro Iwakami (Aniplex); Junichirō Tanaka (TBS); Kozue Kaneniwa (Movic); Ikuo Katō (Houbunsha)
- Written by: Nahoko Hasegawa
- Music by: Tomoki Kikuya
- Studio: Shaft
- Licensed by: NA: Sentai Filmworks; UK: MVM Films
- Original network: TBS, CBC, BS-i, MBS; Specials: BS-i
- Original run: January 12, 2007 – March 30, 2007; Specials: October 19, 2007
- Episodes: 12 + 3 specials
- Anime television series

Hidamari Sketch × 365
- Directed by: Akiyuki Shinbo
- Produced by: Atsuhiro Iwakami (Aniplex); Junichirō Tanaka (TBS); Kozue Kaneniwa (Movic); Ikuo Katō (Houbunsha)
- Written by: Nahoko Hasegawa; Natsue Yoguchi
- Music by: Tomoki Kikuya
- Studio: Shaft
- Licensed by: NA: Sentai Filmworks
- Original network: TBS, MBS, CBC, BS-i; Specials: BS-TBS
- Original run: July 4, 2008 – September 26, 2008; Specials: October 18, 2009 & October 25, 2009
- Episodes: 13 + 1 OVA + 2 specials
- Anime television series

Hidamari Sketch × Hoshimittsu
- Directed by: Akiyuki Shinbo; Kenichi Ishikura (Note: Credited as Series Director (シリーズディレクター, Shirīzu Direkutā))
- Produced by: Atsuhiro Iwakami (Aniplex); Junichirō Tanaka (TBS); Kozue Kaneniwa (Movic); Ikuo Katō (Houbunsha)
- Written by: Nahoko Hasegawa
- Music by: Tomoki Kikuya
- Studio: Shaft
- Licensed by: NA: Sentai Filmworks
- Original network: TBS, MBS, CBC, BS-TBS; Specials: BS-TBS
- Original run: January 8, 2010 – March 25, 2010; Specials: October 24, 2010 & October 31, 2010
- Episodes: 12 + 2 specials
- Anime television series

Hidamari Sketch × SP
- Directed by: Akiyuki Shinbo
- Produced by: Atsuhiro Iwakami (Aniplex); Junichirō Tanaka (TBS); Kozue Kaneniwa (Movic); Hiroyuki Kobayashi (Houbunsha)
- Written by: Nahoko Hasegawa (#1); Miku Ōshima (#2)
- Music by: Tomoki Kikuya
- Studio: Shaft
- Licensed by: NA: Sentai Filmworks
- Original network: BS-TBS
- Original run: October 30, 2011 – November 6, 2011
- Episodes: 2
- Anime television series

Hidamari Sketch × Honeycomb
- Directed by: Akiyuki Shinbo; Yuki Yase
- Produced by: Atsuhiro Iwakami (Aniplex); Junichirō Tanaka (TBS); Kozue Kaneniwa (Movic); Ikuo Katō (Houbunsha)
- Written by: Nahoko Hasegawa; Miku Ōshima
- Music by: Tomoki Kikuya
- Studio: Shaft
- Licensed by: NA: Sentai Filmworks
- Original network: TBS, MBS, CBC, BS-TBS
- Original run: October 5, 2012 – December 21, 2012
- Episodes: 12
- Original video animation

Hidamari Sketch: Sae & Hiro's Graduation Arc
- Directed by: Akiyuki Shinbo; Yuki Yase
- Produced by: Junichirō Tanaka (TBS); Kozue Kaneniwa (Movic); Hiroyuki Kobayashi (Houbunsha); Yūma Takahashi (Aniplex); Miku Ōshima (Shaft)
- Written by: Miku Ōshima
- Music by: Tomoki Kikuya
- Studio: Shaft
- Licensed by: NA: Sentai Filmworks
- Released: November 27, 2013
- Episodes: 2
- Related media
- Light novel adaptation (2007); Nintendo DS video game (2009)

Hidamari Sketch (Japanese: ひだまりスケッチ, Hepburn: Hidamari Suketchi; lit. "Sunny Sketch") is a Japanese yonkoma manga series written and illustrated by Ume Aoki. It follows a group of young female art students, and following their daily lives as close friends and neighbors at the nearby Hidamari Apartments. The manga has been serialized in Houbunsha's monthly magazine Manga Time Kirara Carat since February 28, 2004, with its chapters collected in ten tankōbon volumes as of March 2020. Since 2008, Yen Press has licensed an English translation of the series in North America under the title Sunshine Sketch.

A 12-episode anime adaptation by Shaft aired in Japan between January and March 2007. It was followed by three sequels: Hidamari Sketch × 365, a 13-episode season between July and September 2008; Hidamari Sketch × Hoshimittsu, a 12-episode season between January and March 2010; and Hidamari Sketch × Honeycomb, a 12-episode season between October and December 2012. Two special episodes for each of the first three seasons were broadcast in October 2007, October 2009, and October 2010, respectively, as well as two specials entitled Hidamari Sketch × SP in October and November 2011. A two-episode original video animation, Hidamari Sketch: Sae/Hiro Graduation Edition, was released on November 27, 2013. Since 2010, the series and specials have been licensed in North America with English subtitles by Sentai Filmworks.

== Plot ==
Hidamari Sketch centers around a young girl named Yuno who is finally able to get accepted into Yamabuki Art High School, which she has longed for. To attend the school, Yuno moves and starts to live in a small apartment building named the Hidamari Apartments, located across the street from the school. Once there, she quickly becomes friends with three other occupants at the apartments, including her classmate Miyako and two second-year students: Hiro and Sae. The events of the characters' everyday lives are shown as they attend the school together and get to know each other better. After a year has passed, the girls move up a year and two freshmen, Nazuna and Nori, arrive at Hidamari Apartments. After another year passes, Hiro and Sae graduate while another freshman, Matsuri, moves into the apartments.

== Characters ==
Hidamari Sketch main characters: Hiro (left), Yuno (center), Sae (right), and Miyako (bottom-right).

=== Hidamari Apartments ===
Yuno (ゆの)
Voiced by: Kana Asumi
Yuno, sometimes called "Yunocchi" by Miyako, is the main protagonist in the story and it is mainly through her viewpoint that the story is told, each episode of the anime usually ends with her pondering her feelings about what has gone on during the day, while taking a bath with her rubber duck. She is short and has a noticeably childlike appearance, has fairly short, light-brown hair and almost always wears a pair of black, X-shaped hairpins. She lives in room 201, next to her best friend and classmate, Miyako. She is a skilled artist overall but considers painting and drawing her specialties.
She is a very nice and conscientious person but suffers from low self confidence, constantly struggles with her perceived weaknesses, and often seeks advice from others on how to be a skilled artist, a self-sufficient person, more goal oriented, and eventually how to be a commendable and reliable senior to the younger residents in the apartment building and other junior students. She has shown more skill and interest in cooking over the course of the story, emulating Hiro, supporting Miyako, and in order to be a good mentor to Nazuna and Nori. She is also an only child in her family.
Miyako (宮子)
Voiced by: Kaori Mizuhashi
Miyako, Miya-chan to her best friend and next door neighbor, Yuno, lives in room 202. She has very blonde, shoulder length hair and similarly light colored eyes. She comes from a large family who can't afford to support her like the other parents of the apartment residents can and, for that reason, lives in the slightly unfinished and correspondingly more affordable apartment in the complex; the main issue of her apartment being a very leaky roof. Her family situation also means she lives frugally and often relies on eating with her friends to satisfy her voracious appetite. She is a very spontaneous person and has an active and exuberant personality which borders on childlike, is always trying to have fun with her friends and claims the word "plan" does not exist in her dictionary. She likes to playfully tease her friends as well, prime targets being Hiro's weight and Yuno's child-like appearance. She is an undeniably creative and versatile artist though and often masters new skills quickly. She is also very physically talented, her senses are unusually strong and she can be very athletic, having taught herself how to ride a bicycle on an adult bicycle as soon as her feet could reach the pedals and being an extremely good (if unconventional) self-taught swimmer, among other talents.
Hiro (ヒロ)
Voiced by: Yūko Gotō
Hiro is a year older than Yuno and Miyako, living directly under Yuno's apartment in room 101. She has curly, salmon colored hair that reacts strongly to humidity, appearing to move on its own in the anime, which she wears in a double bun, odango style. She is left-handed. She moved from room 203 when she started her second year in order to be next to her best friend, Sae, and is one of Sae's principal sources of support when she is involved with a deadline or other crisis. She strives to be a supportive senior to the younger girls, and due mainly to her desire to support and properly feed Sae she became a great cook by the end of her first year. Beginning in her second year, the girls frequently get together at her apartment where she will cook for all of them.
She likes rich foods and sweets but tends to worry excessively about her weight, causing her to go on periodic diets. She is quick to retaliate whenever Miyako teases her about her weight, diet, or eating habits, which always result in Miyako receiving a comical lump on her head. Hiro is not a morning person; it is very difficult to wake her up in the morning and, when she does, she does so slowly, staying in a dazed state and uttering nonsensical gibberish to anyone around. She eventually develops the personal goal of becoming an art teacher and claims that Yoshinoya is her inspiration for that choice. She ends up going to a university to continue her art education.
Sae (沙英)
Voiced by: Ryōko Shintani
Sae is a year older than Yuno and Miyako, and lives in room 102, next to her best friend, Hiro. She has a younger sister (initially only featured in the anime), Chika. She is tall, athletic, has short dark hair and a generally tomboyish appearance, accentuated by her plain squarish eyeglasses. She tends to get upset when Miyako refers to her as having masculine qualities. She is a published author and writes fiction professionally under the pseudonym "Aya Tachibana" (橘 文, Tachibana Aya) and enrolled at the school specifically so she could learn how to illustrate her own work. She also has an interest in photography. Sae sometimes writes romantic stories but gets very uncomfortable when asked about her own (actually non-existent) love life, frequently inventing an absurd romantic history for herself, while blushing furiously. She has a similar reaction when she sees Hiro (but not the others) in compromising positions, when Hiro expresses her obvious affection for her, or when it appears other people are romantically interested in Hiro.
Sae is very reserved about expressing her feelings towards any of her friends and especially for her sister, Chika, who she frequently scolds despite holding obvious sisterly affection for. She has a playful side that can be at the same time enigmatic and cunning; she has a habit of giving Yuno just enough warning about potential problems for the younger girl to fail to avoid them. She also has a fondness for playing detective when faced with such anomalies as Miyako's apartment. She is often referred to as the "father" in the Hidamari Apartments "family", with Hiro as the "mother". The first student from her year that she met, even before Hiro, was Natsume, but due to being placed in a separate class and her life in the apartment, she was never able to become close friends with her, a fact that she occasionally seems to regret. Though it makes her sad to separate from Hiro, she goes on to attend a different University than her, one that will better develop her writing talents.
Nori (乃莉)
Voiced by: Hitomi Harada
Nori is another student introduced as a freshman with Nazuna. She is called "Norippe" by Miyako. She lives in room 103. She has lighter blue hair with pigtails. She is in the art department and likes to play with computers. Nori has said that her hobbies are Computer Graphics, HTML, and Adobe Flash. She is honest and straightforward. She is generally the most level-headed one out of the main characters and is usually pointing out the others' weird ways. She frequently has some sort of outburst if Nazuna is being too timid, and has been known to lecture and even vigorously shake Nazuna when Nazuna refuses to speak what is on her mind. She can speak in a Kansai dialect.
Nazuna (なずな)
Voiced by: Chiaki Omigawa
Nazuna was introduced as a new freshman student in the July 2008 issue of Manga Time Kirara Carat and the third series of the anime, after a year has passed in the timeline of the main story. She lives in room 203. She has sandy blonde hair, braids, and long side bangs. Just months before starting high school her family's house had been in the neighborhood and it was her decision to stay close to home that led her to choose Yamabuki Art High School and enroll as a "general" (non-art) student, but when her father was transferred elsewhere for work and her mother followed with him, she ended up needing to board in Hidamari to attend school. She appears very quiet, reserved, and has an inferiority complex. It has been noted that Nazuna is very popular among the male student body because of her timid personality and that she can be quite a klutz, which makes others feel like they can't leave her alone. Nazuna is closest to Nori, since they are both first year students living at the apartments, and admires Yuno, whom she sees as an older sister. Although not in the art department, she shows interest in it.
Matsuri (茉里)
Introduced in the April 2014 issue of Kirara Carat. A freshman in the art department who becomes a resident of the Hidamari Apartments at the start of Yuno's third year, after Hiro and Sae graduate. She is nicknamed "Festa-san" by Miyako as her name means 'festival'. Endlessly enthusiastic and aggressively friendly, Matsuri tries very hard to impress the other girls and live up to Hidamari's reputation for eccentricity.

=== Yamabuki High School teachers ===
Yoshinoya (吉野屋)
Voiced by: Miyu Matsuki
Yoshinoya is Yuno and Miyako's homeroom teacher and art instructor. She is buxom, exuberant, and a cosplay maniac. She will frequently wear incredibly complicated costumes that are at times truly inappropriate and will often attempt to model them for her class, usually leading her to be scolded by the principal. Some of the things she says also tend to make her students uncomfortable. She still resides with her parents and is often criticized by them for not being mature. She is an extremely skilled artist and cares about her students very much but will go to any lengths to avoid doing the school's required paperwork. Otherwise she is shown to be a good teacher who can offer practical advice about their studies and future ambitions. When asked her age, she will answer "eternally seventeen". She has a younger brother who is already married and has a child.
The Principal (校長, Kōchō)
Voiced by: Chō
The Principal is a thin, aging and balding man who appears frail, as he constantly shakes, but occasionally exhibits great feats of athleticism. He appears most often to chastise Yoshinoya over her inappropriate behavior and inability to finish class paperwork. His name is unknown, but in one episode of the anime, Yuno was writing the names of people on pictures as part of an exam. When she got to the Principal, the whole class thought his name was "Moai".
Kuwahara (桑原)
Voiced by: Naoko Suzuki (first season), Eriko Kigawa (first season specials, ×365) and Natsuko Kuwatani (×Hoshimittsu, ×Honeycomb)
Kuwahara is the school nurse at Yamabuki High. She generally acts as a comic foil to Yoshinoya, who is almost always using her nurse's office to nap in.
Mashiko (益子)
Voiced by: Takuma Terashima
A male teacher who wears glasses and is the teacher of Class 2-B. He shares an office/workroom with Yoshinoya, but she has basically taken over the space to store, construct, and try on her cosplay outfits and he is summarily scolded if he tries to enter without her permission.
Ikezawa (池澤)
Voiced by: Karin Yamaguchi
A female teacher with glasses.

=== Yamabuki High School students ===
Natsume (夏目)
Voiced by: Misato Fukuen
Natsume is a student from class B who acts like a tsundere character toward Sae, masking her strong affection for her by maintaining a generally antagonistic attitude. During her first day at Yamabuki, she faced a lot of troubles and was helped by Sae and touched by her kind nature, developing feelings for her. To her dismay she was separated into another class and quickly became jealous and envious of Hiro's burgeoning relationship with Sae. Ever since, she has been trying to hide her feelings in Sae's presence by acting nonchalant, initially declaring herself to be her rival. Eventually though she becomes less confrontational around her and occasionally visits Sae and the others at the apartment, when invited. She is also one of the few people who knows of Sae's pen name and is an admirer of her books. After graduating, she goes to the same university as Hiro.
Mami (真実)
Voiced by: Miyuki Sawashiro
Yuno and Miyako's classmate.
Nakayama (中山)
Voiced by: Misato Fukuen
Yuno and Miyako's classmate.
Arisawa (有沢)
Voiced by: Mai Nakahara
An upperclassman two years above Yuno who she meets and becomes friends with one day. After she graduates, she stays in contact with Yuno. Later on, she suggests to Yuno that she call her 'Arisa', as her fellow college friends call her that.
Tōdō (藤堂)
Voiced by: Marina Inoue
The president of Yamabuki High School's Broadcasting Club, and is a third-year student when Yuno and Miyako are in the first year and Hiro and Sae are in the second year. She is an original character in the anime and doesn't appear in the manga adaptations.

=== Other characters ===
Landlady (大家, Ōya)
Voiced by: Miyuki Sawashiro
The Landlady is the female owner of Hidamari Apartments. She has quite a few masculine characteristics as she often wears a baseball cap, goes out for a fishing in her spare time, and is a heavy smoker. Although she has a very laid-back personality, she is often seen very busy doing various part-time jobs such as delivering pizza on her moped. Despite this, she is highly devoted to her tenants and sincerely believes she is doing them a great service, and in the graduation arc reveals the existence of a mutual-assistance society for former Hidamari Apartments tenants that she asks Hiro and Sae to join.
Chika (智花)
Voiced by: Rie Kugimiya
Chika is Sae's younger sister, who is two years younger than her. She is more spontaneous and energetic than her older sister. She enjoys cooking and has an infatuation with a kabuki actor. She has no artistic talent and prefers music and home economics to art. Initially only appearing in the anime adaptation, she made her first appearance in the manga in the June 2012 issue of Manga Time Kirara Carat.
Yuno's father (ゆののお父さん, Yuno no Otō-san) and Yuno's mother (ゆののお母さん, Yuno no Okā-san)
Voiced by: Takahiro Mizushima and Michiko Neya
Yuno's overprotective parents who are particularly weird in their own right.
Misato (みさと)
Voiced by: Ami Koshimizu
The former occupant of room 201 prior to the arrival of Yuno. She was an eccentric upperclassman, 2 years senior of Hiro and Sae, who likes to pull various pranks on the tenants. She was very talented in art, which won her many competitions, and wished to travel the world during college despite the lack of funds.
Lily (リリ, Riri)
Voiced by: Ryoko Shiraishi
The former occupant of room 101 prior to Hiro moving into it from room 203. She was a mature upperclassman who was in the same year as Misato. She was shown to be a very diligent and reliable person, who was always smiling and was respected very much by Hiro. In many occasions, she acted as the voice of reason for Misato.
Ume-sensei (うめ先生)
Voiced by: Aoki Ume
The metapod persona of the series author, Aoki Ume, who appears at various points in the anime without directly interacting with the other characters.

== Media ==
=== Manga ===
An example yonkoma strip from the manga

The original manga, written and illustrated by Ume Aoki, began serialization in the April 2004 issue of Houbunsha's monthly magazine Manga Time Kirara Carat released on February 28, 2004; a total of 155 chapters have been published as of the December 2022 issue. It is formatted in yonkoma (four-panel) style, with two comic strips per page and six to eight pages per chapter; the manga's story is presented in chronological order, unlike in its later anime adaptation. As of March 27, 2020, ten tankōbon volumes (containing 146 chapters) have been published in Japan under Houbunsha's Manga Time KR Comics imprint. On December 8, 2007, Yen Press announced that it had licensed the series for an English-language release under the title Sunshine Sketch; the first translated paperback volume was released in North America on June 17, 2008.

No.	Original release date	Original ISBN	English release date	English ISBN
1	October 27, 2005	978-4-8322-7549-2	June 17, 2008	978-0-7595-2899-4
2	December 27, 2006	978-4-8322-7607-9	November 18, 2008	978-0-7595-2902-1
3	February 27, 2008	978-4-8322-7681-9	April 21, 2009	978-0-7595-3069-0
4	December 25, 2008	978-4-8322-7762-5	January 26, 2010	978-0-316-08112-2
5	March 27, 2010	978-4-8322-7897-4	June 28, 2011	978-0-316-17802-0
6	August 27, 2011	978-4-8322-4057-5	June 26, 2012	978-0-316-21035-5
7	December 19, 2012	978-4-8322-4240-1	December 17, 2013	978-0-316-24312-4
8	February 27, 2015	978-4-8322-4529-7	December 15, 2015	978-0-316-35139-3
9	November 26, 2016	978-4-8322-4769-7	September 19, 2018	978-1-975-32626-5
10	March 27, 2020	978-4-8322-7178-4	October 5, 2021	978-1-975-33560-1

=== Anime ===
A 12-episode anime was produced by Shaft and aired in Japan between January 11 and March 29, 2007. A two-episode addition aired on television on October 18, 2007. The first 12 episodes were released on six DVD compilation volumes containing two episodes each between March 28 and August 22, 2007. A DVD containing the two special episodes was released on October 24, 2007. A mini-episode/promo for Hidamari Sketch X 365 was screened at the November 18, 2007, "Chou Hidamatsuri in Nippon Budokan" event, where the second season of Hidamari Sketch was announced. It was released online on December 12, 2007. The anime is not presented in a chronological sequence though episodes do build upon each other thematically, with details shown in earlier episodes becoming important in later ones. The first season of Hidamari Sketch was licensed in North America by Sentai Filmworks and distributed by Section23 Films; the first season collection was released on DVD with English subtitles on January 12, 2010.

A second season entitled Hidamari Sketch × 365 aired in Japan between July 3 and September 25, 2008, and contained 13 episodes with the 14th episode being bundled with the final DVD volume. Two special episodes for the second season were broadcast on October 17 and October 24, 2009. The second season has also been picked up by Sentai Filmworks, with Section23 Films as distributor. The complete collection was released on DVD, April 6, 2010. A third season, titled Hidamari Sketch × Hoshimittsu (ひだまりスケッチ×☆☆☆), aired between January 8 and March 26, 2010, and contained 12 episodes. Two special episodes for the third season aired in October 2010. This season was also picked up by Section23 Films and was released in North America on July 19, 2011.

Two special episodes titled Hidamari Sketch × SP (ひだまりスケッチ×SP, Hidamari Suketchi Supesharu) aired on October 29 and November 5, 2011, respectively, and were released on Blu-ray Disc and DVD on November 23, 2011, and has yet again been licensed by Sentai Filmworks. A fourth anime season titled Hidamari Sketch x Honeycomb (ひだまりスケッチ×ハニカム, Hidamari Suketchi x Hanikamu) aired on TBS and BS-TBS between October 5 and December 21, 2012, and has also been licensed by Sentai Filmworks. The series was simulcast by The Anime Network in North America and Anime on Demand in the United Kingdom. An original video animation, titled Hidamari Sketch: Sae & Hiro's Graduation Arc (ひだまりスケッチ 沙英・ヒロ 卒業編, Hidamari Suketchi: Sae Hiro Sotsugyō-hen), was released on Blu-ray Disc and DVD on November 27, 2013, and aired on BS-TBS on November 29, 2013. In addition to the DVD and Blu-ray releases, all four seasons, as well as the Graduation Arc (but not the other OVAs), were streamed on Sentai's Hidive website until 2026.

==== Music ====
The first season anime, along with the two-episode addition, used two pieces of theme music, one opening theme, and one ending theme. The opening theme is "Sketch Switch" (スケッチスイッチ, Suketchi Suitchi) by Kana Asumi, Kaori Mizuhashi, Ryoko Shintani, and Yuko Goto; the single containing the opening theme was released on January 24, 2007. The ending theme is "Mebae Drive" (芽生えドライブ, Mebae Doraibu; Seedling Drive) by Marble; the single containing the ending theme was released on February 21, 2007. The first season's original soundtrack was released on April 25, 2007. A character song mini-album named Hida Chara was released on September 5, 2007, containing songs sung by voice actors from the anime. A maxi single entitled "Yume Delivery" (ゆめデリバリー, Yume Deribarī) was released on June 4, 2008, featuring the opening theme to the Hidamari web radio show sung by Asumi.

For the second season, the opening theme is "Hatena de Wasshoi" (?でわっしょい, Hooray for Something) by Asumi, Mizuhashi, Shintani, and Goto; the ending theme is "Ryūsei Record" (流星レコード, Ryūsei Rekōdo; Meteor Record) by Marble. The opening theme single was released on July 23, 2008, and the ending theme was released on August 6, 2008. The second season's original soundtrack was released on October 8, 2008. Four character song singles were released on September 10, 2008, for the four main female characters. An image song collection by Marble entitled Hidamarble was released on September 26, 2008. Two more character songs for the character Yoshinoya (voiced by Miyu Matsuki) and The Principal (voiced by Yūichi Nagashima) was released on November 5, 2008, and the character song single for Ume (voiced by Ume Aoki) was released on January 21, 2009. All albums were released by Lantis.

In the third season, the opening theme is "Dekiru Kanatte Hoshimittsu" (できるかなって☆☆☆, You Can Do It, Three Stars) by Asumi, Mizuhashi, Shintani and Goto; the ending theme is "Sakura Sakura Saku: Ano Hi Kimi o Matsu, Sora to Onaji de" (さくらさくら咲く ～あの日君を待つ 空と同じで～, The Cherry Blossoms Bloom: The Day I Waited For You, Under the Same Sky) by Marble. For Hidamari Sketch x SP, the opening theme is "Kimagure, Jan Ken Pon!" (気まぐれ、じゃんけんポンっ!, Whimsical, Rock Paper Scissors!) by Asumi, Mizuhashi, Shintani and Goto; the ending theme is "Nora" by Marble. For Hidamari Sketch x Honeycomb, the opening theme is "Open Canvas" (おーぷん☆きゃんばす, Ōpun Kyanbasu) by Asumi, Mizuhashi, Shintani, Goto, Chiaki Omigawa, and Hitomi Harada; the ending theme is "Yume Gumo" (夢ぐも, Dream Cloud) by Marble. The ending theme for the graduation episode is "Mata ne, Yōkoso, Hidamari-sō" (またね、ようこそ、ひだまり荘, See you again, Welcome, Hidamari Apartments) by Asumi and Mizuhashi.

=== Light novels ===
Two light novels written by Chabō Higurashi and illustrated by Ume Aoki were released by Houbunsha under their Houbunsha KR Bunko label. The first novel was released on March 31, 2007, entitled Hidamari Sketch Novel: Yōkoso Hidamari-sō e (ひだまりスケッチノベル ようこそひだまり荘へ), and the second followed on September 30, 2007, with the title Hidamari Sketch Novel: Hidamari School Life (ひだまりスケッチノベル ひだまりSchool Life). The novels are not a new adaptation of the manga series, but instead draw directly from the manga's material.

=== Video games ===
A Nintendo DS video game developed by Idea Factory entitled Hidamari Sketch Dokodemo Sugoroku × 365 (ひだまりスケッチ どこでもすごろく×365) was released on February 12, 2009. The game primarily plays like a normal board game (sugoroku) with consecutive boards, each representing a month during Yuno's first school year. Depending on the square landed upon, characters may play one of numerous mini-games, experience mini-events—dialogue and sometimes imagery relating to minor occurrences around Hidamari apartments or the school, or encounter major events which play out similarly to the episode of the anime on which they are based. Points are accrued throughout the year to determine a winning character, and the points can then be used to unlock items in the extras menu. Characters from the series appeared in collaboration with Ameba's mobile game Girl Friend Beta in 2013. Characters from the series appear alongside other Manga Time Kirara characters in the mobile RPG, Kirara Fantasia in 2017.
