= List of Sayonara, Zetsubou-Sensei episodes =

This anime series Sayonara, Zetsubou-Sensei animated by Shaft and directed by Akiyuki Shinbo, had three seasons. The first season premiered in Japan on July 7, 2007, on TV Kanagawa and contained twelve episodes. The first-season content was repackaged, and remade in parts, to release two Zetsubou Girls Collection DVDs in January and August 2008. The second season, Zoku, began airing on January 5, 2008. A set of three Goku OVAs were released, starting with the first volume on October 17, 2008, and the third in early 2009. The Zan season began in mid-2009 and concluded after 13 episodes and two bonus OVAs, the last of which came out in 2010.

All three seasons were re-released on Blu-ray sets in 2011 (Goku episodes being bundled with the Zan season), and purchasers of all three sets were eligible to receive a bonus Blu-ray disc containing a special episode. Though not part of any season, it still uses the same opening and Ending themes as Zan. Nozomi Entertainment released English-subtitled Blu-ray sets of the first season in 2022, and the second season (including the Goku episodes) in 2023. Each episode title is a literary reference, and each episode ends with a still image drawn by one of manga artists associated with Kōji Kumeta.

== Sayonara, Zetsubou-Sensei ==
The series was directed by Akiyuki Shinbo at studio Shaft, with Kenichi Kanemaki as the series composition writer and Naoyuki Tatsuwa as the assistant director, and Tomoki Hasegawa composing the series' music. Hideyuki Morioka designed the characters for animation; and Morioka, Hiroki Yamamura (Studio Pastoral), and Yoshiaki Itou (Shaft) served as the chief animation directors. Half of the season was outsourced to Studio Pastoral: episodes 2, 4–5, 7, 9, and 11. (Note: All outsourcing studios credited in the ending to their respective episodes as Production Assistance (制作協力).)

Opening themes
1. Hito toshite Jiku ga Bureteiru (人として軸がぶれている) - Kenji Ohtsuki feat. Ai Nonaka, Marina Inoue, Yū Kobayashi, Miyuki Sawashiro and Ryoko Shintani (episodes 1-9, 12)
2. Gōin ni Mai Yeah~ (強引niマイYeah～) - Ai Nonaka, Marina Inoue, Yū Kobayashi and Ryoko Shintani (episodes 10-11)

Ending theme
1. Zessei Bijin (絶世美人) - Ai Nonaka, Marina Inoue, Yū Kobayashi and Ryoko Shintani

No.	Title	Directed by (Note: Information is taken from the ending credits of each episode.)	Written by	Storyboarded by	Original release date
1	"Sayonara, Zetsubou-sensei"; Transliteration: "Sayonara Zetsubō sensei" (Japanese: さよなら絶望先生)	Yukihiro Miyamoto	Kenichi Kanemaki	Michio Fukuda	July 7, 2007
On the first day of school, Kafuka Fuura finds a man who has hanged himself amidst blossoming cherry trees. She paradoxically pulls him down while strangling him further. Having survived, the downcast man is bewildered by Kafuka's relentlessly optimistic nature, where she denies his suicidal intent wholeheartedly, and bestows him with a nonsensical nickname. Later, at school, the man introduces himself as Kafuka's teacher, Nozomu Itoshiki, and she reveals the portentous writing of his name as "despair" (zetsubou) to the class. Demonstrating his hopeless worldview, Zetsubou-sensei subverts the class's career goals questionnaire as a ranking of least hopeful career goals instead.
2	"When He Came Out of the Long Tunnel, All Was White"; Transliteration: "Tonneru o nukeru to shirokatta" (Japanese: トンネルを抜けると白かった)	Yoshihiro Mori	Katsuhiko Takayama	Yoshihiro Mori	July 14, 2007
Charged with visiting Kiri Komori, a problem student who never attends school, Zetsubou-sensei discovers that she is an extreme hikikomori holed up at home. Kafuka insists that Kiri is, instead, a zashiki-warashi who must remain ensconced at home to ward off impoverishment, and Zetsubou-sensei cynically plays along to declare his job done. However, after seeing and complimenting Kiri's hidden beauty, he unwittingly charms her into holing up in the school instead. Then, charged with counseling Matoi Tsunetsuki, a problem student who obsessively stalks each of her boyfriends, Zetsubou-sensei instead introduces her to suicide pacts as a greater declaration of love. In doing so, he unwittingly charms her into becoming his own stalker instead. He also accidentally shares an infirmary cot with Chiri Kitsu, who, pursuing exactitude in all things, begins demanding marriage.
3	"Jump Across the Country to Me"; Transliteration: "Sono Kuni o Tobikoshite Koi" (Japanese: その国を飛び越して来い)	Tomoyuki Itamura	Kenichi Kanemaki	Kazuya Shiotsuki & Naoyuki Tatsuwa	July 21, 2007
Kaere Kimura transfers into the class from overseas. Belligerent and at odds with Japanese culture, Kaere alternates personalities with "Kaede", an alter ego who is obedient to Japanese tradition. Kaede timidly pines for Zetsubou-sensei from afar, while Kaere presses charges against him for harassment, vindicating his stereotypical views of foreigners. Then, the student Taro Sekiutsu is replaced in class by a small foreign girl answering to his name. The others discover that the girl, "Maria", is a refugee who illegally immigrated to Japan and purchased Sekiutsu's name. The class warms to Maria's ingénue nature and becomes collectively protective of her.
4	"Be Not Defeated by Elbows, Be Not Defeated by Knees"; Transliteration: "Hiji ni mo makezu Hiza ni mo makezu" (Japanese: ヒジニモ負ケズ ヒザニモ負ケズ)	Masayuki Iimura	Katsuhiko Takayama	Jou Tanaka	July 28, 2007
4	"The Antenna Is Rising, We Must Try to Live"; Transliteration: "Antena Tachinu Iza Ikimeyamo" (Japanese: アンテナ立ちぬ いざ生きめやも)	Masayuki Iimura	Katsuhiko Takayama	Jou Tanaka	July 28, 2007
Abiru Kobushi is a suspected victim of domestic abuse due to ever-present injuries. Instead of confronting her father, Zetsubou-sensei spies on him, cowing himself into submission by his overactive imagination. However, he discovers that Abiru's injuries all come from horseplay with animals, and especially her fetishizing of their tails. Then, Meru Otonashi's nervous, silent demeanor at first gains Zetsubou-sensei's favor, only for the class to fall victim to her exclusive use of abusive e-mails for communication.
5	"Compare Your Height"; Transliteration: "Mi no take kurabe" (Japanese: 身のたけくらべ)	Hideyuki Yoshida	Katsuhiko Takayama	Shuuji Miyazaki	August 4, 2007
5	"The Stain and Poison"; Transliteration: "Shimi to Doku Dashi" (Japanese: シミと毒出し)	Hideyuki Yoshida	Katsuhiko Takayama	Keita Shimizu & Hiroki Yamamura	August 4, 2007
Decrying conspicuous consumption, Zetsubou-sensei measures students' inner worth and cuts their lots in life down to size accordingly. Chiri, in approval, forces downmarket goods and asceticism upon everyone. In protest, Zetsubou-sensei stages a lavish and squanderous death for himself. Then, after a hot spring "detoxes" the students' toxic personalities, Zetsubou-sensei showcases things that lose their appeal when made wholesome. He reverses the class's detoxification, only to get detoxified, seemingly leaving no trace of himself behind.
6	"Leap Before You Glance"; Transliteration: "Miau mae ni tobe" (Japanese: 見合う前に跳べ)	Tomoyuki Itamura	Masashi Kubota	Tomonori Kogawa (Note: Credited as Otokanbun (音間聞).)	August 11, 2007
After Zetsubou-sensei declares himself gone missing, his brother, Mikoto, reveals that Nozomu returned to their hometown for marriage by miai. At the estate of the prestigious Itoshiki family, a preposterous miai ritual is held, binding all present to immediate marriage upon making eye contact (also miai). Resisting the designs of his family and students, Zetsubou-sensei demonstrates his lifelong mastery of avoiding eye contact with all things.
7	"Confessions of a Pseudonym"; Transliteration: "Kamei no kokuhaku" (Japanese: 仮名の告白)	Yoshihiro Mori	Katsuhiko Takayama	Yoshihiro Mori	August 18, 2007
7	"One Morning, Gregor Samsa Awoke to Find Himself Carrying a Portable Shrine"; Transliteration: "Aru Asa Guregōru Zamuza ga Me o Samasu to Mikoshi o Katsuideita" (Japanese: ある朝 グレゴール・ザムザが目をさますと神輿を担いでいた)	Yoshihiro Mori	Katsuhiko Takayama	Yoshihiro Mori	August 18, 2007
A miscommunication with Harumi Fujiyoshi, who draws doujinshi fan manga, leads Zetsubou-sensei to attend Comiket to sell literary doujinshi in confusion. After Chiri forces Harumi to draw 4-koma comics, Zetsubou-sensei shows them the secret "fifth panel" of 4-koma, which reveals the dark turns that real-life stories take. Then, Zetsubou-sensei and students attend a matsuri where, rather than transporting deities for spiritual worship, the portable shrines are carried by media bosses to hype various unremarkable people for celebrity worship.
8	"I Was Predestined to Be Obscure"; Transliteration: "Watashi wa shukumeiteki ni hikagemono de aru" (Japanese: 私は宿命的に日陰者である)	Yukihiro Miyamoto & Yuusuke Kamata	Masashi Kubota	Michio Fukuda	August 25, 2007
Having resigned himself to a life in the shadows, Zetsubou-sensei discusses many examples of greatness that was overshadowed next to yet greater things. However, when he finally notices Kagerou Usui, a student so "shadowy" that he goes unnoticed by all, Zetsubou-sensei is so horrified as to renounce shadows. Then, for "disaster preparation", a fire officer conducts drills to prepare the class for the "disaster" of being criticized. Calling everyone demeaning names condescendingly, he leaves them all despondent and spiteful. As everyone is about to insult Kagerou's baldness, Kafuka brings the beautiful school counselor Chie Arai to call him names in their place, transforming the context into erotic humiliation instead. A non-sequitur parody of the shower scene from Psycho concludes the episode.
9	"Evening Primroses Are a Mistake for Mt. Fuji"; Transliteration: "Fuji ni tsukimisō wa machigatte iru" (Japanese: 富士に月見草は間違っている)	Hideyuki Yoshida	Kenichi Kanemaki	Yuusuke Kamata	September 1, 2007
Zetsubou-sensei challenges the class to apply spot-the-mistakes puzzles to life, driving everyone to depression by recalling various regrets. Because such puzzles have "correct" answers, however, Kafuka declares all "found" mistakes to be corrected, and grants absolution to various publicly disgraced people. A boy with a striking resemblance mistakes Zetsubou-sensei for his father, and is suspected of being a "mistake" as in illegitimate child. Then, learning that the boy, Majiru, is his nephew, Zetsubou-sensei challenges Majiru, followed by the entire class, to produce proof of their identities. However, when he himself is unable to do the same, the class bands together to gaslight Zetsubou-sensei, causing him to disbelieve his own identity and become an amnesiac drifter.
10	"A Lone Cultured Man Stood Under the Rashomon, Waiting for a Break in the Rain"; Transliteration: "Hitori no bunkajin ga Rashōmon no shita de amayadori shite ita" (Japanese: 一人の文化人が羅生門の下で雨やどりしていた)	Yukihiro Miyamoto	Masashi Kubota	Michio Fukuda	September 8, 2007
10	"I Must Burn Down Namayatsuhashi"; Transliteration: "Nama-yatsuhashi o Yakaneba Naranu" (Japanese: 生八ツ橋を焼かねばならぬ)	Tomoyuki Itamura	Masashi Kubota	Michio Fukuda	September 8, 2007
Believing that the school culture festival is compulsory under Article 25 of the Constitution of Japan guaranteeing "minimum standards of wholesome and cultured living", Zetsubou-sensei forces the class to lower each possible cultural activity to its "minimum standards". Despite many sorry showings, the class is unable to degrade itself sufficiently and resorts to displaying the "minimum standard" of a classroom lesson. Then, the class takes a "preliminary inspection" of a class trip to Kyoto, which includes the itinerary but no sightseeing. Zetsubou-sensei rationalizes that timid people need to "inspect" undertakings in advance to avoid failure or disappointment, while a temple priest demonstrates "inspections" of things so intimidating that one never follows through. Zetsubou-sensei inspects his own future funeral, and ends up inspecting his own death in advance.
11	"I Can't Do That, There's Source Material"; Transliteration: "Are ikenai yo Gensaku ga aru ja nai ka ne" (Japanese: あれ 不可よ 原作があるじゃないかね)	Yoshihiro Mori	Kenichi Kanemaki	Yoshihiro Mori	September 16, 2007
The students confront a movie director to complain about a film adaptation, but, having followed the source material, he dodges the blame. Zetsubou-sensei guides the class to many pathways representing other things that are followed to escape responsibility, up to and including divine guidance. Then, the students gather at Zetsubou-sensei's house after a surprise decluttering by Chiri. Encouraged by examples of people and things that have been stalled by setbacks, Zetsubou-sensei leads everyone in a group hibernation through winter to stall through their respective setbacks, but must battle Chiri in a duel of sleep-inducing vs. insomnia-inducing things. In an anime-original cliffhanger ending, after a close call with carbon monoxide poisoning, Zetsubou-sensei contemplates suicide once more, but is hit by a streetcar. The class gathers in vigil at a hospital, only for the next episode to ignore the cliffhanger entirely.
12	"What a Nuisance I've Been!"; Transliteration: "Nan taru meiwaku de aru koto ka!" (Japanese: なんたる迷惑であることか!)	Masayuki Iimura	Katsuhiko Takayama	Tatsuya Oishi	September 23, 2007
When Ai Kaga compunctiously takes blame for imagined offenses to others, Zetsubou-sensei indicts Japanese society as a whole for tending to yield or self-reproach. Before long, he yields to the entire world by suicide, only to return to life to take the blame for dying. Then, Mayo Mitama, a girl with resting bitch face, escapes blame for her outright malicious acts due to the fear of judging by appearances. Zetsubou-sensei realizes that this is just one example of people's tendency to second-guess the most obvious conclusion. Despite knowing this, he too ends up second-guessing himself; thus, even after repeatedly catching her red-handed, taking blame for her crimes, and then falling victim to them, Zetsubou-sensei denies Mayo's culpability.

=== Zetsubou Girls Collections ===
No.	Title	Original release date
1	"Sayonara, Zetsubou-sensei"; Transliteration: "Sayonara Zetsubō sensei" (さよなら絶望先生)	January 1, 2008
1	"When He Came Out of the Long Tunnel, All Was White"; Transliteration: "Tonneru o nukeru to shirokatta" (トンネルを抜けると白かった)	January 1, 2008
1	"Before Me, There's No One; Behind Me, There's You"; Transliteration: "Boku no Mae ni Hito wa Inai Boku no Ushiro ni Kimi wa Iru" (僕の前に人はいない 僕の後ろに君はいる)	January 1, 2008
1	"Be Not Defeated by Elbows, Be Not Defeated by Knees"; Transliteration: "Hiji ni mo makezu Hiza ni mo makezu" (ヒジニモ負ケズ ヒザニモ負ケズ)	January 1, 2008
1	"Jump Across the Country to Me"; Transliteration: "Sono Kuni o Tobikoshite Koi" (その国を飛び越して来い)	January 1, 2008
1	"Align Your Books Precisely on the Shelves, Go Out into the Streets!"; Transliteration: "Sho o Kichinto Hondana ni Shimatte Machi e Deyō" (書をきちんと本棚にしまって町へ出よう)	January 1, 2008
1	"No Matter What, We've Got to Stick Together"; Transliteration: "Bokutachi wa, Donna Koto ga Atte mo Issho ni Katamatteinakereba Dame da" (僕たちは、どんなことがあっても一緒に固まっていなければ駄目だ)	January 1, 2008
Character introductions adapted in the first season are remade to faithfully reproduce the original manga chapters. Throughout, vignettes of Nami's boring everyday life while skipping school are shown. A 20-minute abridged version was aired on BS11 Digital on January 4, 2008, one day before the debut of the Zoku season.
2	"Zetsubou-sensei Returns"; Transliteration: "Kaettekita Zetsubō Sensei" (帰ってきた絶望先生)	August 27, 2008
2	"The Antenna Is Rising, We Must Try to Live"; Transliteration: "Antena Tachinu Iza Ikimeyamo" (アンテナ立ちぬ いざ生きめやも)	August 27, 2008
2	"Confessions of a Pseudonym"; Transliteration: "Kamei no kokuhaku" (仮名の告白)	August 27, 2008
2	"What a Nuisance I've Been!"; Transliteration: "Nan taru meiwaku de aru koto ka!" (なんたる迷惑であることか!)	August 27, 2008
2	"Beta Sexualis"; Transliteration: "Beta Sekusharisu" (ベタ·セクシャリス)	August 27, 2008
2	"The Stain and Poison"; Transliteration: "Shimi to Doku Dashi" (シミと毒出し)	August 27, 2008
Character introductions adapted in the first season are remade to faithfully reproduce the original manga chapters. In a bonus segment, after the first season finishes airing, the cast begins slacking off. They imagine various spinoffs and publicity stunts that would restore their motivation, but realize that none are feasible—except having the manga linked to a crime in a news report.

== Zoku Sayonara Zetsubou-Sensei ==
The series features a majority of staff returning from the first season. Akiyuki Shinbo, Naoyuki Tatsuwa, and Hideyuki Morioka returned as director, assistant director, and character designer (respectively); and Morioka and Hiroki Yamamura (Studio Pastoral) acted as chief animation directors (but without Yoshiaki Itou from the first season). Yukihiro Miyamoto joined the production as chief unit director, Kenichi Kanemaki was replaced as series composition writer by Yuuichirou Oguro, and Shaft (under the collective penname of Fuyashi Tou) took credit for the composition itself. Episodes 2, 4, 6, 8, and 12 were outsourced to Studio Pastoral; and segments, or the whole of, episodes 3, 5, 7, 9, 11, and 13 were outsourced to Gainax.

Each episode ends with a reading of a parody of a famous literary work, from one of the manga volumes.

Opening themes
1. Kūsō Rumba (空想ルンバ) - Kenji Ohtsuki and Zetsubō Shōjo-tachi (broadcast episodes 1-3, 5, 6, 8-10, 12, 13; home video episodes 1-6, 8-10, 12, 13)
2. Lyricure Go Go! (リリキュアGOGO!) - Ai Nonaka, Marina Inoue and Ryōko Shintani (episode 7)

Ending themes
1. Koiji Romanesque (恋路ロマネスク) - Zetsubō Shōjo-tachi (broadcast episodes 1-4; home video episodes 1-6)
2. Marionette (マリオネット) - Rolly and Zetsubō Shōjo-tachi (broadcast episodes 5-12; home video episodes 7-9)
3. Omamori (オマモリ) - Ai Nonaka, Marina Inoue, Yū Kobayashi and Ryoko Shintani (broadcast episode 13; home video episodes 10-13)

No.	Title	Directed by	Storyboarded by	Original release date
1	"Listen, the Baron Is Ranting"; Transliteration: "Hora, danshaku no mōgen" (Japanese: ほら, 男爵の妄言)	Yukihiro Miyamoto	Yukihiro Miyamoto	January 5, 2008
1	"This Class Has Many Issues, Thank You for Your Understanding"; Transliteration: "Tōkumi wa Mondai no Ōi Kyōshitsu desu kara dōka Soko wa Goshōchi Kudasai" (Japanese: 当組は問題の多い教室ですからどうかそこはご承知ください)	Yukihiro Miyamoto	Naoyuki Tatsuwa	January 5, 2008
In an adaptation of the joke jacket blurb from the first manga volume, Nozomu Itoshiki, a multi-level marketing salesman, faces various Kafkaesque tribulations: being hunted by a secret society called "Hamasho", being transformed into a half-mole cricket, becoming a castaway, becoming a teacher at an all-girls school and receiving a nonsensical nickname, and being pressured into a marriage of convenience. Then, Nami Hitou, seeking pity by missing school and telling sob stories, is thwarted at every turn when the circumstances of Zetsubou-sensei and his class prove more piteous by far. Accepting a dare to prove that staying at school is easier than staying away, Nami is sent fleeing by Kafuka's macabre after-hours antics. Later, Nami is chagrined to have her reactions called normal.
2	"When You Opened Up Your Bangs for the First Time"; Transliteration: "Mada akesomeshi maegami no" (Japanese: まだ明け初めし前髪の)	Akira Katou	Noboru Jitsuhara	January 12, 2008
2	"Decorations at Tiffany's"; Transliteration: "Tifanī de sōshoku o" (Japanese: ティファニーで装飾を)	Akira Katou	Tomoyuki Itamura	January 12, 2008
2	"Rouse Up, O Young Men of the Old Age!"; Transliteration: "Atarashikunai Hito yo, Mezame yo" (Japanese: 新しくない人よ、目覚めよ)	Akira Katou	Tomoyuki Itamura	January 12, 2008
A strange man arrives at school, brazenly "opening" many things in different senses. He discovers that Zetsubou-sensei's heart resists opening, only to be engulfed by a nightmarish reality within. The man finally learns about various things that should not be opened. In the broadcast version of this segment, all voice acting is gibberish, and the intended script is replaced with joke subtitles. The proper voice track released on home video tells the original story from chapter 12 of the manga: the man is pretending to be Commodore Perry, known for "opening" Japan to foreign trade. (Note: According to chapter 124 of the manga, the broadcast was not permitted to satirize the historical Perry, even in subtitles.) Then, Zetsubou-sensei and Kafuka argue whether various ostentatious things are excessive or, in fact, masterful. Zetsubou-sensei ends up hounded by malevolent spirits that can only be warded off by excessive application of sutras by his brother Kei. Then, Zetsubou-sensei and an old friend reunite and appreciate various things said to be "old". The old friend attempts to wed Zetsubou-sensei's sister, Rin, to render his birth name "old". Finally, by writing the character for "old" differently, Kafuka reinterprets many "old" things as things that lasted only "one day". Throughout this segment, the wrong background is drawn, but is not acknowledged by the characters.
3	"You're 17, Don't You Want to Pinch Your New Wrinkles?"; Transliteration: "Jūnana-sai ne, jibun no shiwa o tsukande mitaku nai?" (Japanese: 十七歳ね, 自分のシワをつかんで見たくない?)	Yuusuke Kamata	Yuusuke Kamata	January 19, 2008
3	"Obligations and Soldiers"; Transliteration: "Gimu to heitai" (Japanese: 義務と兵隊)	Yuusuke Kamata	Yuusuke Kamata	January 19, 2008
3	"'Don't Drop a Bombshell Like That On Me!' Rebuffed Melos as He Got to His Feet"; Transliteration: "'Saratto iu na!' To merosu wa, ikiritatte hanbaku shita" (Japanese: 「さらっと言うな!」とメロスは、いきり立って反駁した)	Yuusuke Kamata	Yuusuke Kamata	January 19, 2008
The class discusses ways of living without acting one's age, and encounter Manami Ookusa, a classmate who is also a working housewife with a debt-ridden husband. Kikuko Inoue, the voice of Manami, also appears as herself to deliver her trademark age-denying catchphrase. This story is performed as a radio play heard in the background while Harumi draws a doujinshi, only to discover that she has chosen an unpopular pairing. The same segment, with the foreground audio mixed out, was released as a home video bonus in Japan. Then, Zetsubou-sensei interprets the personal trademark looks and signatures of various celebrities as social obligations. The class observes failed personal trademarks that turn into self-imposed obligations, as well as impositions that turn into obligations for others. Discovering that his own domestic irresponsibility has obligated Kiri to mother both him and Majiru, Zetsubou-sensei shamelessly accepts this arrangement. Then, Zetsubou-sensei nonchalantly holds the class back a year, and explains various other explosive revelations that are made offhandedly. The class contributes first-hand examples, including Rin's surprise enrollment. Everyone joins in on making, and reacting to, mundane revelations explosively.
4	"Roadside Artist"; Transliteration: "Robō no eshi" (Japanese: 路傍の絵師)	Yoshihiro Mori	Yuuichi Nakazawa	January 26, 2008
4	"I Have Read Books Full of Shame"; Transliteration: "Hazukashii Hon bakari Yondekimashita" (Japanese: 恥ずかしい本ばかり読んできました)	Yoshihiro Mori	Yoshihiro Mori	January 26, 2008
4	"Summer of the Usume"; Transliteration: "Usume no natsu" (Japanese: 薄めの夏)	Yoshihiro Mori	Yoshihiro Mori	January 26, 2008
The class discusses various trivialities that distract from larger concerns. Suddenly, aliens invade with an army of giant robots. The students excavate a stone mask that transforms Chiri into a giant. The alien commander, distracted by voyeuristic reconnoitering, fails to defend against the larger concern of Chiri's counterattack, while others are distracted from the spectacular story by off-color observations. Throughout this segment, the cast is drawn off-model; the same segment, with the characters redrawn on-model, was released as a home video bonus in Japan. Then, Zetsubou-sensei, intimidated by Jun Kudou's vast repertoire of read books and skilfully empathetic storytelling, fears that Jun can "read" many other things, including hearts, minds, and the ending of this segment. In defiance, he substitutes a non-sequitur ending that no one could have "read". Then, an idle scene between Majiru and Kiri during the alien invasion is shown in full. Viewer metrics arrive, proving that this inconsequential segment was more engrossing than the main story.
5	"Family Tree of the Arts"; Transliteration: "Bunka eizu" (Japanese: 文化系図)	Masayuki Iimura	Masayuki Iimura	February 2, 2008
5	"I Always Called Him 'Leftover'"; Transliteration: "Watashi wa Sono Hito o Tsune ni Nokorimono to Yondeita" (Japanese: 私はその人を常に残りものと呼んでいた)	Masayuki Iimura	Tomonori Kogawa	February 2, 2008
5	"Beyond the Pale of Condescension"; Transliteration: "On kise no kanata ni" (Japanese: 恩着せの彼方に)	Masayuki Iimura	Naoyuki Tatsuwa	February 2, 2008
At Zetsubou-sensei's behest, the class sits out of the school athletics festival to participate in a "cultured" version without any athletics, so as to level the playing field for non-athletic people. He draws increasingly belabored distinctions between "athletic" things and non-athletic counterparts that are either science or art in nature, and vice versa. Then, Zetsubou-sensei views fukubukuro with deep suspicion that they merely contain undesirable leftover inventory. This yields a discussion of desirable leftovers, and other things that are left over in various senses. Then, Zetsubou-sensei questions the virtue of good deeds done while expecting gratitude, relating examples where one sinks to condescension to fish for thanks in return. The class demonstrates that such self-serving condescension extends to even due courtesies and manipulative pricing tactics. Humbled by these examples, Ai begins denying all gratitude from others, and accidentally becomes a tsundere.
6	"I Beg You, Do Not Know"; Transliteration: "Kimi shiritamō koto nakare" (Japanese: 君 知りたもうことなかれ)	Akira Katou	Akira Katou	February 9, 2008
6	"The Tale of Hoichi the Dreamless"; Transliteration: "Yumenashi Houichi no Hanashi" (Japanese: 夢無し芳一の話)	Akira Katou	Akira Katou	February 9, 2008
6	"Concealed Soldier"; Transliteration: "Inpei-sotsu" (Japanese: 隠蔽卒)	Akira Katou	Akira Katou	February 9, 2008
Just as most students would rather not know their grades, Zetsubou-sensei lists many other off-putting things that one would rather not know. He departs to the wilds to avoid all knowledge, only to be surrounded by prophetic omens of the natural world. Giving up, he seeks out the omniscient knowledge of a neighborhood gossip. Then, in Zetsubou-sensei's dream, the personalities of everyone in class are reversed. Realizing that they only exist in his dream, the dream students turn murderous in order to make him "sleep forever". Zetsubou-sensei is desperate to wake up in a dream ending, but, in series tradition, can only come up with non-endings in the form of non-sequitur jokes. Then, taking literally the Japanese for "wisdom tooth", the class goes forth to find various things unknown to one's parents. Because his wisdom teeth are also unknown to his parents, Zetsubou-sensei sends various notices in desperation to avoid having them pulled. Throughout this segment, all voice actors are switched periodically. The same segment, with the correct voice actors, was released as a home video bonus in Japan.
7	"The Cat That Was Told a Million Times"; Transliteration: "Hyakumankai iwareta neko" (Japanese: 百万回言われた猫)	Tomoyuki Itamura	Tomoyuki Itamura	February 16, 2008
7	"Red Riding Hood Sleeps, Be Careful"; Transliteration: "Aka zukin-chan, neru. Ki o tsukete" (Japanese: 赤頭巾ちゃん、寝る。気をつけて)	Asushi Nishigori	Asushi Nishigori	February 16, 2008
7	"Tsugaru Correspondence Learning"; Transliteration: "Tsugaru Tsūshin Kyōiku" (Japanese: 津軽通信教育)	Yukihiro Miyamoto	Takahiro Yoshimatsu (Note: Credited as Something Yoshimatsu (サムシング吉松).)	February 16, 2008
The episode opens as a parody of a magical girl anime, complete with Opening theme song. After once again having his name read as zetsubou, Zetsubou-sensei sympathizes with various people who, due to their circumstances, have heard the same overly apt puns, one-liners, and assumptions numerous times. Then, on "Zetsubou Channel", brief pastiches of various TV shows are shown, including the continuation and conclusion of the earlier magical girl show. Then, noticing Japan's indulgence of students studying for university entrance exams, Zetsubou-sensei schemes to become a lifelong exam-taker through certification exams. After achieving every possible certification in life, he once again resorts to suicide, but is stymied by a gauntlet of challenging exams to qualify for dying. Throughout this segment, artstyles are switched periodically, including shadow theatre, collage, claymation, psychedelia, and flip book animation.
8	"Spineapple Pudding"; Transliteration: "Supainatsu purin" (Japanese: スパイナツプリン)	Masayuki Iimura	Masayuki Iimura	February 23, 2008
8	"When the Exposures Bear Fruit"; Transliteration: "Bakuro no mi no juku suru toki" (Japanese: 暴露の実の熟する時)	Masayuki Iimura	Masayuki Iimura	February 23, 2008
8	"The Curious Casebook of Inspector Hanbun"; Transliteration: "Hanbun torimono-chō" (Japanese: 半分捕物帳)	Masayuki Iimura	Masayuki Iimura	February 23, 2008
Zetsubou-sensei laments various innocent situations where one is suspected of spying—whether in the sense of peeping, unauthorized filming, or stealing ideas. After numerous such accusations, he sincerely turns traitor to Japan, but his new masters suspect him of being a double agent. Kafuka mounts a counterintelligence campaign by spreading inane urban legends. Then, with the arrival of May, Zetsubou-sensei points to various people who reveal their true selves after some time, especially with the passage from April to May. Then, on Autumnal Equinox Day, which is half daytime and half nighttime, Zetsubou-sensei illustrates idiomatic "half" things that are not literally halved. Chiri forcibly alters various "half" things to be scrupulously literal. This segment is animated as if printed on paper, with minimal motion.
9	"As They Say, It's Better to Be a Couple than a Single"; Transliteration: "Pin yori Konbi no hō ga ee iu koto dessharo" (Japanese: 一人より女夫の方がええいうことでっしゃろ)	Hiroaki Tomita	Hiroaki Tomita	March 1, 2008
9	"The Secret Passage to the Interior"; Transliteration: "Oku no nukemichi" (Japanese: 奥の抜け道)	Ayumu Kotake	Hiroyuki Imaishi	March 1, 2008
In a series of Ultraman parody segments, the cast plays out crude fights as tokusatsu monsters. As a prehistoric teacher, Zetsubou-sensei laments that his class eschews learning for mindless violence. A Monolith arrives and grants intelligence to humanity, but nothing changes. After watching manzai comedy, Maria identifies people who have spaced out in various ways as having become boke, and physically assaults them according to manzai convention. After discovering that some boke are secretly on guard, Maria is indoctrinated by nationalists and attacks Japan's foreign policy as boke in the National Diet. Then, deeming in-school inspections insufficiently high-stakes, Zetsubou-sensei institutes covert surprise inspections—in which everyone is caught on camera in careless moments. Chiri is appalled by the carelessness on display throughout society, but Kafuka reminds her that carefree blunderers are endearing. Seeking the endearment that she herself never received, Chiri commits blunders with life-and-death consequences—mostly for Zetsubou-sensei.
10	"Deteriorated Blossoms, Flowing Water"; Transliteration: "Rekka ryūsui" (Japanese: 劣化流水)	Yuusuke Kamata	Tomonori Kogawa	March 8, 2008
10	"A Fool's Work"; Transliteration: "Chijin no ari" (Japanese: 痴人のアリ)	Yuusuke Kamata	Yuusuke Kamata	March 8, 2008
10	"The First-time Customer Condition"; Transliteration: "Ikken no Jō-ken" (Japanese: 一見の條件)	Yuusuke Kamata	Yuusuke Kamata	March 8, 2008
Zetsubou-sensei remarks on the newfound appeal of things that are "detuned", where their performance is curbed or imperfections are added. Many merely underwhelming things are used as ironic examples as well. Then, Zetsubou-sensei warns that, just as one becomes a fashion victim when swayed by the bad taste of fashionistas, everyone risks entertaining obviously tasteless ideas when swayed by the bad taste of others. He is likewise swayed by others to entertain ill-advised romances with everyone in class—except Chiri. Then, realizing that the show—like various exclusive establishments and subcultures—is no longer accessible to newcomers, the cast extends hospitality to first-time viewers by obligingly explaining every character and joke. Despite their exasperation, they learn that regular viewers, who incessantly call out references and anticipate jokes, are similarly insufferable.
11	"Twelve Dark Zetsubou Girls"; Transliteration: "Kuroi jūni-nin no zetsubō shōjo" (Japanese: 黒い十二人の絶望少女)	Yukihiro Miyamoto	Naoyuki Tatsuwa	March 15, 2008
11	"May This Moon on This Night of This Month Be Clouded by My Tears"; Transliteration: "Kongetsu Kon'ya no Kono Tsuki ga Boku no Namida de Kumorimasu yō ni" (Japanese: 今月今夜のこの月が僕の涙で曇りますように)	Shouji Saeki	Shouji Saeki	March 15, 2008
In a parody of a Kosuke Kindaichi mystery, Detective Nozomu Itoshiki is called to investigate serial murders targeting the twelve young "daughters" of the late Sakebu Itoshiki (no relation), who turn out to have been his secret lovers. The detective accuses Kagerou, Sakebu's previously-unnoticed son, of committing the murders based on his father's beloved anime series, not realizing that this was a red herring: luring the detective to the estate's storehouse, the surviving girls reveal that they are killing other in jealousy out of their shared, unrequited love for Sakebu. Brandishing knives, the girls demand that Nozomu—who is a dead ringer—take Sakebu's place, but he flees while accidentally burning down the storehouse. True to his reputation, "Detective Zetsubou" once again solves the case, only for all involved parties to end up dead. Then, because Zetsubou-sensei predicts that Tanabata wishes will never come true in a lifetime, Kafuka reasons that they will, therefore, be granted in next lifetimes, spontaneously inspiring a cult to form.
12	"The Landings of Virtue"; Transliteration: "Chakuriku no sakae" (Japanese: 着陸の栄え)	Masayuki Iimura	Masayuki Iimura	March 22, 2008
12	"A Certain Woman's Role"; Transliteration: "Aruru on'na-yaku" (Japanese: 或る女 役)	Masayuki Iimura	Masayuki Iimura	March 22, 2008
12	"Pororoca Riding the Waves"; Transliteration: "Nami ni notte kuru pororokka" (Japanese: 波に乗ってくるポロロッカ)	Masayuki Iimura	Masayuki Iimura	March 22, 2008
Warning of the dangers of abrupt changes, Zetsubou-sensei adds school holidays to the month before summer vacation, winning the class's support. He teaches how to likewise downplay various rude awakenings as "soft landings" instead of "hard landings", aided by a flight simulator in which one "lands" using polite fictions and subterfuge. To the class's dismay, Zetsubou-sensei's holiday plan is approved hand-in-hand with adding school days over summer vacation. Then, thanks to his obliging nature, Zetsubou-sensei inadvertently plays parts (inevitably bit parts) in various other people's momentous occasions. Then, observing the tidal bore phenomenon, Zetsubou-sensei showcases other cart-before-the-horse phenomena, especially fans who discover their interests not firsthand, but secondhand through pop culture. Kafuka praises such circuitous pursuits as "manly", rallying a chorus of men who collectively confess the dubious gateways for their various hobbies. Likewise, Zetsubou-sensei's old friend becomes belatedly named "Ikkyu-san" after his debut.
13	"Dismissals of Myohonji Temple in Kamakura"; Transliteration: "Kamakura myohōnji kaiko" (Japanese: 鎌倉妙本寺解雇)	Yukihiro Miyamoto	Yukihiro Miyamoto	March 29, 2008
13	"Daidoji Shinsuke: The Early Voice"; Transliteration: "Daidōji Shinsuke no onsei" (Japanese: 大導寺信輔の音声)	Tomoyuki Itamura	Tomoyuki Itamura	March 29, 2008
13	"(Assuming That We Are) Brother and Sister"; Transliteration: "A ni imou to, to iu zentei de." (Japanese: あにいもうと、という前提で。)	Shouji Saeki	Shouji Saeki	March 29, 2008
Setsubun bean-throwing prompts Zetsubou-sensei's concern that society not only indiscriminately drives out unwanted oni, but also relegates various people who fell from favor to "strays". Many such "stray" public figures are brought into Zetsubou-sensei's care, causing the school to fire him. Reduced to a "stray teacher" in the far north, Zetsubou-sensei is touchingly reunited with the class after devolving to a stray dog. Then, at Jun's rakugo performance, Meru's father reveals that Meru repressed her own voice due to bullying. He holds an audition to recruit a live-dub actor for Meru, enlisting various wildly inappropriate candidates. Then, Zetsubou-sensei identifies various hasty actions based on assumptions, whether in colloquial, professional, or romantic settings. Arriving in Akihabara, he encounters the cynical assumptions made in marketing and pandering to otakus. Finally, a battle manga character acts out a stereotypical rivalry with Zetsubou-sensei, mistakenly assuming that he will join the cast.

=== Goku Sayonara Zetsubou-sensei ===
The OVA retains much of the same staff from Zoku with few changes. Akiyuki Shinbo, Naoyuki Tatsuwa, Yukihiro Miyamoto, Hideyuki Morioka, and Hiroki Yamamura all retain their previous roles as director, assistant director, chief unit director, character designer/chief animation director, and chief animation director, respectively. However, Oguro is replaced as series composition writer by Shinbo and Shaft (the latter under the collective penname of Fuyashi Tou) themselves.

Opening themes
1. Kūsō Rumba (空想ルンバ) - Kenji Ohtsuki and Zetsubō Shōjo-tachi (vol. 1-2)
2. Kūsō Rumba Rap (空想ルンバらっぷ) - Kenji Ohtsuki and Zetsubō Shōjo-tachi feat. Rapbit (vol. 3)

Ending themes
1. Marionette (マリオネット) - Rolly and Zetsubō Shōjo-tachi (vol. 1)
2. Omamori (オマモリ) - Ai Nonaka, Marina Inoue, Yū Kobayashi and Ryoko Shintani (vol. 2-3)

No.	Title	Directed by	Storyboarded by	Original release date
1	"The Sweet Girl"; Transliteration: "Amai hime" (Japanese: あまい姫)	Yukihiro Miyamoto	Naoyuki Tatsuwa; Hiroki Yamamura	October 17, 2008
1	"A Portrait of Prohibition"; Transliteration: "Hakkin chāo" (Japanese: 発禁抄)	Yukihiro Miyamoto	Naoyuki Tatsuwa; Hiroki Yamamura	October 17, 2008
1	"A Shield of the Original"; Transliteration: "Genkei no tate" (Japanese: 原型の盾)	Yukihiro Miyamoto	Naoyuki Tatsuwa; Hiroki Yamamura	October 17, 2008
After receiving many Valentine's chocolates from the class, Zetsubou-sensei frets about falling victim to honey trapping. Kafuka reveals that seductive female spies have been neutralized in Japan by entrusting state secrets to otaku who shun real women for animated characters. What's more, these "elites" are also immune to anime merchandise honeypots, due to the inferior quality of foreign bootlegs. Then, watching a boring talent competition, Zetsubou-sensei contemplates various competitions with vicious behind-the-scenes intrigues that go unseen. He soon discovers that the students' vicious behind-the-scenes battles for his affection likewise go unseen. Then, wearing an old-fashioned costume to an all-cosplay Halloween party, Zetsubou-sensei bemoans Halloween tradition and other things that bear no resemblance to their former selves. Finally, because artist Kumeta's artstyle no longer resembles its former self, Zetsubou-sensei reverts to Kumeta's early artstyle.
2	"It Is Said That a Happy Process Is the Root of All Evil"; Transliteration: "Iwaku, Katei no Kōfuku wa Shoaku no Moto" (Japanese: 曰く, 過程の幸福は諸悪の本)	Yukihiro Miyamoto; Masayuki Iimura	Naoyuki Tatsuwa; Masayuki Iimura; Yukihiro Miyamoto	December 10, 2008
2	"Bulletin from the Prophecy Ministry"; Transliteration: "Yogen-shō kokuji" (Japanese: 予言省告示)	Yukihiro Miyamoto; Masayuki Iimura	Naoyuki Tatsuwa; Masayuki Iimura; Yukihiro Miyamoto	December 10, 2008
2	"The Name of the Rows of Books"; Transliteration: "Barabara no namae" (Japanese: バラバラの名前)	Yukihiro Miyamoto; Masayuki Iimura	Naoyuki Tatsuwa; Masayuki Iimura; Yukihiro Miyamoto	December 10, 2008
Performing his duty to visit students' homes, Zetsubou-sensei lingers on the way to Chiri's house but leaves immediately upon arriving. The animation changes to Kumeta's early artstyle again, as Zetsubou-sensei accuses Japanese culture of lingering on process while neglecting outcome in various ways, and lampoons the popularity of immature characters and coming-of-age stories. Kafuka reveals that, after the spurned Chiri attacked him, Zetsubou-sensei has been lingering in a hallucination in the "process" of falling to his death. Then, buying into a popular earthquake forecast hoax, the cast, certain that the magazine publication of this very story will be preempted, becomes demotivated. Zetsubou-sensei compares their token appearances to various other futile efforts that people knowingly make. Throwing caution to the wind, the cast indulges in blatantly unprintable mischief (all replaced with sanitized placeholders). Then, nitpicking the non-descriptive titles of famous books, Zetsubou-sensei encourages both Kuniya Kino and Jun to retitle them in literal fashions. To make the title Sayonara, Zetsubou-sensei literal, Chiri sends off Zetsubou-sensei to certain death with a title drop. This segment is animated in a gothic manga artstyle.
3	"Dialogue in the Darkness"; Transliteration: "Anchū Mondō" (Japanese: 暗中問答)	Yukihiro Miyamoto; Masayuki Iimura	Naoyuki Tatsuwa	February 17, 2009
3	"The Loser Book"; Transliteration: "Maketa no sōshi" (Japanese: 負けたの草子)	Yukihiro Miyamoto; Masayuki Iimura	Naoyuki Tatsuwa	February 17, 2009
3	"Tall Tales from Japan"; Transliteration: "Ichi-pon mukashibanashi" (Japanese: 一本昔ばなし)	Yukihiro Miyamoto; Masayuki Iimura	Naoyuki Tatsuwa	February 17, 2009
The class depicts the difficulty of writing new jokes in a long-running manga by telling joke ideas in the game of "one hundred scary stories". Frighteningly (for the writer), every joke offered is rehashed, unfunny, or inopportune somehow. After Kafuka suggests this very premise as the forbidden one hundredth "story", everyone meets a terrible fate: coming up with more ideas the next day. Then, the class stumbles onto a "battlefield with no winners", and observes various arguments and contests so self-debasing that both sides come off as losers. Kafuka then explains other battles where both sides "win"—by collusion. Then, in an anime-original flashback segment, young Nozomu is recruited by a shady high school club that discovered his hidden potential for negativity.

== Zan Sayonara Zetsubou-Sensei ==
All of the main staff from Goku remain the same for Zan, including director/series composition writer Akiyuki Shinbo, studio/series composition writer Shaft, assistant director Naoyuki Tatsuwa, chief unit director Yukihiro Miyamoto, character designer/chief animation director Hideyuki Morioka, and chief animation director Hiroki Yamamura (Studio Pastoral). Several parts or the wholes of different episodes were outsourced to other studios: episodes 2-3 and 11 to Studio Pastoral; episodes 4, 9, and 12 to Mushi Production; episode 5 to Mito Animation; and episodes 6, 10, and 13 to Studio Izena.

Each episode opens with a reading of the joke jacket blurb from one of the manga volumes, and ends with an installment of the "Zetsubou-sensei Drawing Song" with two of the cast members singing and drawing along.

Opening theme
1. "Ringo Mogire Beam!" (林檎もぎれビーム!) - Kenji Ohtsuki and Zetsubō Shōjo-tachi

Ending themes
1. "Zetsubō Restaurant" (絶望レストラン) - Zetsubō Shōjo-tachi (episodes 1–9, 13)
2. "Kurayami Shinchū Sōshisōai" (暗闇心中相思相愛) - Hiroshi Kamiya (episodes 10–12)

No.	Title	Directed by	Storyboarded by	Original release date
1	"The Way to Hell"; Transliteration: "Rakuen e no Michi" (Japanese: 落園への道)	Yukihiro Miyamoto	Naoyuki Tatsuwa	July 4, 2009
1	"The Postman of Spring Always Rings Twice"; Transliteration: "Haru no yūbin haitatsu wa ni-do beru o narasu" (Japanese: 春の郵便配達は二度ベルを鳴らす)	Yukihiro Miyamoto	Naoyuki Tatsuwa	July 4, 2009
1	"Wuthering Blights"; Transliteration: "Sarashi ga oka" (Japanese: 晒しが丘)	Yukihiro Miyamoto	Naoyuki Tatsuwa	July 4, 2009
After Zetsubou-sensei expounds on the excesses and unintended consequences of superstitions, other teachers—fearing his inauspicious name—imprison him to protect university entrance exam takers from bad luck. Zetsubou-sensei's students, combining their talents, stage a prison breakout. The jailers are placated when Kafuka invents a new superstition turning Zetsubou-sensei into an exam-taking good luck charm. Then, on a pleasant spring day, the class finds many unpleasant tidings of spring—in society. Chiri demands that these "tidings" be replied in kind, forcing the others to one-up the pantomimes of kooks and exhibitionists who appear in spring. Then, as Nami departs on a "self-discovery" tour, Zetsubou-sensei warns that tourists invariably reveal their worst selves. In allowing Rin to lure him onto the tour, he likewise reveals his own incorrigible voyeurism. The story continues in the next episode.
2	"She Who Has"; Transliteration: "Motsu Onna" (Japanese: 持つ女)	Yukihiro Miyamoto; Masayuki Iimura	Naoyuki Tatsuwa; Masayuki Iimura	July 11, 2009
2	"Time Stories of Russia"; Transliteration: "Oroshi ya kuni taimu Tan" (Japanese: おろしや国タイム譚)	Yukihiro Miyamoto; Masayuki Iimura	Naoyuki Tatsuwa; Masayuki Iimura	July 11, 2009
2	"Wuthering Blights Part 2"; Transliteration: "Sarashi ga oka pāto 2" (Japanese: 晒しが丘 パート2)	Yukihiro Miyamoto; Masayuki Iimura	Naoyuki Tatsuwa; Masayuki Iimura	July 11, 2009
Admiring talented people who are endowed with more than one gift, Zetsubou-sensei imagines their possible alternate lives. Because society has already pigeonholed these people by singular talents, the class tours a parallel world where many alternate callings have flourished. Then, Zetsubou-sensei explains various things that belatedly take effect, such as delayed-release pills or slow-dawning realizations. The segment ends with a belated punchline to a years-old joke from Katteni Kaizō. Then, continuing from the previous episode, after the students join the tour and each reveal unflattering qualities, Kafuka charismatically leads the tourists on a cultlike mass confession of personal failings. Horrified, Zetsubou-sensei swaps places with a kagemusha decoy to hide his own failings.
3	"The Tragedy of ✕"; Transliteration: "Peke no Higeki" (Japanese: ×の悲劇)	Yukihiro Miyamoto; Naoyuki Tatsuwa	Naoyuki Tatsuwa	July 18, 2009
3	"I will not return to Japan. I could not make that promise" Transliteration: "Watashi wa Nihon ni wa kaerimasen. Sōiu kesshin o dekimasende shita." (Japanese: 私は日本には帰りません。そういう決心をできませんでした。)	Yukihiro Miyamoto; Naoyuki Tatsuwa	Naoyuki Tatsuwa	July 18, 2009
3	"Doctor Kahogo"; Transliteration: "Dokutoru kahogo" (Japanese: ドクトル・カホゴ)	Yukihiro Miyamoto; Naoyuki Tatsuwa	Naoyuki Tatsuwa	July 18, 2009
Kafuka discovers literal power switches for various people who are "switched on" by mention of their hobbyhorses. Zetsubou-sensei's own switch turns out to be a self-destruct. Then, Zetsubou-sensei commiserates with the class on indecisions between two choices that lead to choosing neither. They cite many baffling, regrettable "third choices" that are settled on, and other third options such as equivocating. Pressed to decide between living or dying, Zetsubou-sensei chooses to return to infancy instead. Then, thoroughly protected from danger by his decoy, Zetsubou-sensei is brought to a gathering of people who overprotect their own persons or possessions. The story continues in the next episode.
4	"How I Became an Honest Man"; Transliteration: "Yo wa Ika ni Shite Maningen to Narishi ka" (Japanese: 余は如何にして真人間となりし乎)	Yukihiro Miyamoto; Yasuo Iwamoto (Note: Assisted by Souichi Shimada.)	Naoyuki Tatsuwa; Tomoyuki Itamura	July 25, 2009
4	"Family Tree of Celebration"; Transliteration: "Iwai keizu" (Japanese: 祝系図)	Yukihiro Miyamoto; Yasuo Iwamoto	Naoyuki Tatsuwa; Tomoyuki Itamura	July 25, 2009
4	"Doctor Kahogo Part 2"; Transliteration: "Dokutoru kahogo pāto 2" (Japanese: ドクトル・カホゴ パート2)	Yukihiro Miyamoto; Yasuo Iwamoto	Naoyuki Tatsuwa; Tomoyuki Itamura	July 25, 2009
The class discusses things that are done at the wrong place or time. Zetsubou-sensei grouses that even consciously minding place and time can backfire. However, because popular entertainment is set in improper places and times, everyone time travels to the Sengoku period, which was the wrong place and time for nearly everything. Then, at a beach, Zetsubou-sensei questions whether Marine Day can be celebrated by inlanders, and leads a discussion of other special occasions where celebration is inappropriate. He concludes that holidays in general are no longer celebratory, due to the pressures of the rat race and economic anxiety. Accordingly, the class learns various ways to holiday without enjoying oneself, revealing that the beach, too, was a fake backdrop. Then, continuing from the previous episode, Zetsubou-sensei is beset by the overprotectiveness of copyright enforcement, public safety, and obtrusive promotion. Renouncing his decoy's protection, he realizes that the decoy spent the day on a date with Abiru.
5	"Overmassaging"; Transliteration: "Katatataki" (Japanese: 過多たたき)	Yukihiro Miyamoto; Toshikatsu Tokoro	Naoyuki Tatsuwa	August 1, 2009
5	"The Adventures of A, Leap and B"; Transliteration: "Ā to urū to Byi no bōken" (Japanese: アーとウルーとビィの冒険)	Yukihiro Miyamoto; Toshikatsu Tokoro	Naoyuki Tatsuwa	August 1, 2009
5	"The Releaser in the Rye"; Transliteration: "Raimugi hata de minogashite" (Japanese: ライ麦畑で見逃して)	Yukihiro Miyamoto; Toshikatsu Tokoro	Naoyuki Tatsuwa	August 1, 2009
The class relates examples of puffery and superlatives, which inspire incredulity rather than trust. They play a game of old maid where players try to discard not suited cards, but superlative epithets. Zetsubou-sensei loses, and becomes saddled with a hyperbolic nickname. Then, just as the year gained a leap second, Zetsubou-sensei suspects that society has likewise discreetly gained "leap people". The class finds various examples of supernumerary people, such as uninvited guests, astroturfed turnouts, and expanding band lineups. Chiri, likewise, is reminded that she has always been a third wheel, and is recruited by the "Leap Man Group", who stage performance art using supernumerary people and things. Then, Zetsubou-sensei uses the Hōjō-e festival—when caught animals are released, and forgiveness is practiced—as an excuse to be released from Abiru's side, begging that his decoy's tryst be likewise forgiven. He follows Kafuka's advice to practice blissful ignorance, by learning to forgive all discrepancies and red flags. The story continues in the next episode.
6	"The Measles of Madison County"; Transliteration: "Madison-gun no Hashika" (Japanese: マディソン郡のはしか)	Yukihiro Miyamoto; Kazuhide Kondou	Naoyuki Tatsuwa	August 8, 2009
6	"Polygon in the Night"; Transliteration: "Yoru no ta kakugata" (Japanese: 夜の多角形)	Yukihiro Miyamoto; Kazuhide Kondou	Naoyuki Tatsuwa	August 8, 2009
6	"The Releaser in the Rye Part 2"; Transliteration: "Raimugi hata de minogashite pāto 2" (Japanese: ライ麦畑で見逃して パート2)	Yukihiro Miyamoto; Kazuhide Kondou	Naoyuki Tatsuwa	August 8, 2009
News of a measles outbreak leads the class to consider other ills that are more safely befallen in childhood than adulthood, such as unhealthy fixations and iniquitous urges. Then, Zetsubou-sensei is troubled by a hardline political poster at Kanako Oura's home, but then sees that she has simply openhandedly allowed posters from an assortment of parties. Observing that individual problems appear less egregious in greater assortments, he reasons that making a problem sufficiently multifarious will smooth it over. However, he learns that starting multifarious love affairs does not smooth over his students' murderous jealousy. Then, continuing from the previous episode, Chiri combats ignorance by affixing maker's marks to all things and people, causing various mortifying revelations—only for Kafuka to insinuate esoteric gods as the makers of all mankind.
7	"Do Androids Dream of Mechanical Brides?"; Transliteration: "Andoroido wa Kikai no Hanayome no Yume o Miru ka" (Japanese: アンドロイドは機械の花嫁の夢を見るか)	Naoyuki Tatsuwa; Masanori Takahashi	Naoyuki Tatsuwa; Tomoyuki Itamura	August 15, 2009
7	"No Longer Shogun"; Transliteration: "Shōgun shikkaku" (Japanese: 将軍失格)	Naoyuki Tatsuwa; Masanori Takahashi	Naoyuki Tatsuwa; Tomoyuki Itamura	August 15, 2009
7	"Ahh, a surprise, I murmured in a daze" Transliteration: "Aa Sapuraizu da yo, to Watashi wa Utsuro ni Tsubuyaku no de Atta" (Japanese: ああサプライズだよ、と私はうつろに呟くのであった)	Naoyuki Tatsuwa; Masanori Takahashi	Naoyuki Tatsuwa; Tomoyuki Itamura	August 15, 2009
Miko Nedu and Shoko Maruuchi fleece Zetsubou-sensei by running a razor and blades racket. Kiri chides him as well as Majiru—who is collecting a build-a-figure toy—for irresponsible spending, but she soon dips into household funds to likewise build a life-size Zetsubou-sensei automaton. Majiru accidentally breaks the completed automaton, and gaslights his real uncle into taking its place as Kiri's obedient plaything. Then, on a warm winter day, the class finds the ailing "winter shogun", the personification of cold winters in Japan. The shogun quits to seek a new job, but cannot personify anything so compellingly as befits a shogun. Everyone is soon reminded that being dubbed "shogun" is so common as to be unflattering today. Then, to surprise Zetsubou-sensei, the class throws him a birthday party on the wrong day. Chiri's havoc-wreaking entrance fails to surprise, illustrating Zetsubou-sensei's point that life's unwelcome surprises have raised the bar for unexpected things. The story continues in the next episode.
8	"Ahh, a surprise, I murmured in a daze Part 2"; Transliteration: "Aa Sapuraizu da yo, to Watashi wa Utsuro ni Tsubuyaku no de Atta Pāto 2" (Japanese: ああサプライズだよ、と私はうつろに呟くのであった パート2)	Naoyuki Tatsuwa; Hisatoshi Shimizu	Naoyuki Tatsuwa; Tomoyuki Itamura	August 22, 2009
8	"The Posses in Confession-Colored Crêpes"; Transliteration: "Kokuhaku chirimen-gumi" (Japanese: 告白縮緬組)	Naoyuki Tatsuwa; Hisatoshi Shimizu	Naoyuki Tatsuwa; Tomoyuki Itamura	August 22, 2009
8	"The End and the Beginning of Enoden"; Transliteration: "Saigo no, soshite hajimari no enoden" (Japanese: 最後の、そして始まりのエノデン)	Naoyuki Tatsuwa; Hisatoshi Shimizu	Naoyuki Tatsuwa; Tomoyuki Itamura	August 22, 2009
Continuing from the previous episode, the class is shown how only anticlimax can surprise those expecting to be surprised. Then, hoping for future clemency, Zetsubou-sensei undertakes confession "training" despite having no crime to confess yet. The class also practices group confessions and reacting to confessions. Catastrophically, with widespread confessions, all popular drama resolves prematurely and all sectors of society are mired in scandal. Then, aboard a "mystery train", Zetsubou-sensei observes that just as the train's "mystery" destination is predecided, the passengers seek opinions on various matters that they have already decided. He finds many other such "trains", such as leading opinion polls, presumption of guilt, and discriminatory screening. Finally, he boards a train bound for the "station" of putting off important decisions—the most popular destination of all. This segment is animated using bricolage artwork.
9	"The Emergency That Became a Nun"; Transliteration: "Ama ni Natta Kyūba" (Japanese: 尼になった急場)	Yukihiro Miyamoto; Masayuki Iimura	Naoyuki Tatsuwa; Masayuki Iimura	August 29, 2009
9	"The Correct Answer of 30 Years Hence"; Transliteration: "San jū-nen-go no seikai" (Japanese: 三十年後の正解)	Yukihiro Miyamoto; Masayuki Iimura	Naoyuki Tatsuwa; Masayuki Iimura	August 29, 2009
9	"Jeremy Thatcher, Long-Drive Hatcher"; Transliteration: "Jeremī to dorakon no tamago" (Japanese: ジェレミーとドラコンの卵)	Yukihiro Miyamoto; Masayuki Iimura	Naoyuki Tatsuwa; Masayuki Iimura	August 29, 2009
As Zetsubou-sensei surmises, the class is skilled at resorting to various emergency makeshifts, such as makeshift birthday presents, fake makeup, and payday loans. When the students accidentally kill Zetsubou-sensei, Chiri deploys other makeshifts such as hiding bodies and eliminating witnesses. Then, the classroom transforms into a quiz show, and Zetsubou-sensei poses various situations where correct answers should not be given, for reasons such as sycophancy, diplomacy, and overscrupulousness. The contestants also fail to find any correct answers when trying to affirm depressed people. Kafuka sends Zetsubou-sensei back in time to the pre-Enlightenment, where he is executed for speaking heretical truths. Then, after practicing at a driving range, the class is ushered to other "tees" which test the "range" to which one can venture out of one's comfort zone—while committing various faux pas or deprived of various crutches. The story continues in the next episode.
10	"The Egg of the Crack"; Transliteration: "Kurakku na Tamago" (Japanese: クラックな卵)	Yukihiro Miyamoto; Kazuhide Kondou	Naoyuki Tatsuwa; Kazuhide Kondou	September 5, 2009
10	"Do You Know the Country Next Door?"; Transliteration: "Kimi yo shiru ya tonari no kuni" (Japanese: 君よ知るや隣の国)	Yukihiro Miyamoto; Kazuhide Kondou	Naoyuki Tatsuwa; Kazuhide Kondou	September 5, 2009
10	"Jeremy Thatcher, Long-Drive Hatcher Part 2"; Transliteration: "Jeremī to dorakon no tamago pāto 2" (Japanese: ジェレミーとドラコンの卵 パート2)	Yukihiro Miyamoto; Kazuhide Kondou	Naoyuki Tatsuwa; Kazuhide Kondou	September 5, 2009
Invoking the chicken or the egg dilemma, Zetsubou-sensei poses ironic and cynical versions of the conundrum, while also muddling cause-and-effects that are already clear-cut. In earnest, he contemplates whether hope begat despair, or vice versa. Then, Zetsubou-sensei becomes paranoid that everyday laggards and nuisances, who disrupt daily life to the point of sabotage, could actually be undercover saboteurs. Chiri misunderstands the word "spy" in Japanese, causing her to give away trade secrets to industrial spies, and then teach spycraft to children in place of arts and crafts. Then, continuing from the previous episode, Kafuka tests the proximity of one's "approach shot" in situations that are too close for comfort.
11	"Glasses Girl's House"; Transliteration: "Meganekko no Ie" (Japanese: 眼鏡子の家)	Naoyuki Tatsuwa; Yuu Nobuta	Naoyuki Tatsuwa; Akira Takamura	September 12, 2009
11	"An Encouragement of Lockdown"; Transliteration: "Heimon no susume" (Japanese: 閉門ノススメ)	Naoyuki Tatsuwa; Yuu Nobuta	Naoyuki Tatsuwa; Akira Takamura	September 12, 2009
11	"The Garment Seen by the Scholar Ageashitori"; Transliteration: "Gakusha ageashitori no mita kimono" (Japanese: 学者アゲアシトリの見た着物)	Naoyuki Tatsuwa; Yuu Nobuta	Naoyuki Tatsuwa; Akira Takamura	September 12, 2009
The class takes up a collection to buy new glasses for Zetsubou-sensei, but discover a shop selling "tinted glasses" that bestow various kneejerk prejudicial worldviews. The proprietor observes that everyone is wearing such glasses, even without patronizing his shop. Then, everyone in class is under lockdown at home for reasons unspecified. (Note: However, references to the 2009 swine flu pandemic can be seen.) Seeking diversions, Rin impetuously purchases neighboring houses to move freely through town. The story continues in the next episode. Then, the students perform provocative high kicks while cheerleading. Zetsubou-sensei notes that public attention-seekers also commit provocative gaffes for notoriety or patronage. Understanding that they must not take the bait, the class practices steering clear of provocative "high kicks"—and countering with their own, in the form of various mistakes hidden throughout this segment.
12	"After the Third Time"; Transliteration: "Sanji no Ato" (Japanese: 三次のあと)	Yukihiro Miyamoto; Naoyuki Tatsuwa; Yuusuke Kamata	Naoyuki Tatsuwa; Yuusuke Kamata	September 19, 2009
12	"A Secret That Wasn't Buried"; Transliteration: "Sō rare sokoneta himitsu" (Japanese: 葬られ損ねた秘密)	Yukihiro Miyamoto; Naoyuki Tatsuwa; Yuusuke Kamata	Naoyuki Tatsuwa; Yuusuke Kamata	September 19, 2009
12	"An Encouragement of Lockdown Part 2"; Transliteration: "Heimon no susume pāto 2" (Japanese: 閉門ノススメ パート2)	Yukihiro Miyamoto; Naoyuki Tatsuwa; Yuusuke Kamata	Naoyuki Tatsuwa; Yuusuke Kamata	September 19, 2009
A discussion of Schrödinger's cat inspires the class to hide things in boxes, to foster hope in the unobserved "infinite" possibilities of even foregone conclusions. Soon, everyone in class is wearing cardboard box outfits. Then, the class finds the Taepodong-2 missile landed in the schoolyard. Fearing that they will be forcibly disappeared for national security, everyone concocts various ineffectual ruses to disguise the towering missile. They discover that the missile was a fake carrying brainwashing propaganda, only for the real missile to touch down. Then, continuing from the previous episode, Nami, desperately bored at home, takes over tunneling through properties as Rin acquires them—to a ramen shop, to a karaoke box, and finally to school, where everyone resumes classes despite still being under lockdown. Then, the softcore porn parody starring Kaere from episode 4 is continued.
13	"The Vendetta at Misspelled-gahara"; Transliteration: "Gojiingahara no Katakiuchi" (Japanese: 誤字院原の敵討)	Yukihiro Miyamoto; Kazuhide Kondou	Naoyuki Tatsuwa; Masayuki Iimura; Kazuhide Kondou	September 26, 2009
13	"We Are Linus"; Transliteration: "Ware-ra rainasu" (Japanese: われらライナス)	Yukihiro Miyamoto; Kazuhide Kondou	Naoyuki Tatsuwa; Masayuki Iimura; Kazuhide Kondou	September 26, 2009
13	"The Grand Prize of Optimism"; Transliteration: "Rakuten taishō" (Japanese: 楽天大賞)	Yukihiro Miyamoto; Kazuhide Kondou	Naoyuki Tatsuwa; Masayuki Iimura; Kazuhide Kondou	September 26, 2009
13	"Kiyohiko Night"; Transliteration: "Yakan Kiyohikō" (Japanese: 夜間きよ飛行)	Yukihiro Miyamoto; Kazuhide Kondou	Naoyuki Tatsuwa; Masayuki Iimura; Kazuhide Kondou	September 26, 2009
The home video release of this episode opens with the cast reflecting on the author's self-criticism of the "Kiyohiko Night" story which concludes this episode. After meticulously straightening a painting on exhibit, Chiri fails to notice that it is upside-down. Appropriately, the exhibit collects major mistakes which were overlooked while catching minor ones. Then, when Kiri loses her security blanket, it is found by Prime Minister Tarō Asō and mass-produced as social security, causing a miraculous economic recovery amidst the Great Recession. With Kiri overwhelmed, the class considers other "security objects", such as schadenfreude, civil service employment, and Zetsubou-sensei himself. Then, Maria misunderstands the word of the year award and accidentally summons personifications of past words of the year—all of whom have become obsolete. Finally, on Christmas Eve, Maria mishears "Silent Night" in Japanese as "Kiyohiko Night", and accidentally summons a man called Kiyohiko. Everyone decides to celebrate his fondest desires.

=== Zan Sayonara Zetsubou-Sensei Bangaichi ===
Opening theme
1. "Ringo Mogire Beam!" (林檎もぎれビーム!) - Kenji Ohtsuki and Zetsubō Shōjo-tachi

Ending themes
1. "Zetsubō Restaurant" (絶望レストラン) - Zetsubō Shōjo-tachi (episode 1)
2. "Kurayami Shinjū Sōshisōai" (暗闇心中相思相愛) - Hiroshi Kamiya (episode 2)

No.	Title	Directed by	Storyboarded by	Original release date
1	"The Protest's Intent"; Transliteration: "Demo no Ito" (Japanese: デモの意図)	Yukihiro Miyamoto; Naoyuki Tatsuwa; Masanori Takahashi	Naoyuki Tatsuwa; Masanori Takahashi	November 17, 2009
1	"Fashions Are Short-Lived, Run On Girl"; Transliteration: "Hayari tan shi hashireyo otome" (Japanese: 流行り短し走れよ乙女)	Yukihiro Miyamoto; Naoyuki Tatsuwa; Masanori Takahashi	Naoyuki Tatsuwa; Masanori Takahashi	November 17, 2009
1	"Spill Spill Fill"; Transliteration: "Chiru chiru michiru" (Japanese: 散る散る・満ちる)	Yukihiro Miyamoto; Naoyuki Tatsuwa; Masanori Takahashi	Naoyuki Tatsuwa; Masanori Takahashi	November 17, 2009
During May Day labor rights demonstrations, Zetsubou-sensei observes that the "demo" in "demonstration" (literally "but" in Japanese) dooms Japanese activism to halfhearted protests that are undermined by caveats, reservations, and second thoughts. His own contrarian nature is exploited similarly to undermine a boycott of the 2008 Olympic Games. Then, as Nami pretends to appreciate Tomihiko Morimi's The Night Is Short, Walk On Girl, Zetsubou-sensei calls out affectation of intellectualism by lowbrow people, who accept highbrow things without question. Being lowbrow one and all, the class decides to affect highbrow comedy by faking in-jokes with esoteric references, so as to demand laughter without question—only to confuse themselves. Then, Chiri's slovenly older sister, Tane, returns home. Chiri becomes constantly preoccupied with tidying the heaps of trash that Tane spontaneously attracts. Zetsubou-sensei learns that Tane became a slob in self-sacrifice, to divert Chiri's compulsive cleaning away from harmful ends. He and Tane become mutually enamored.
2	"General Virus and the Three Doctor Brothers"; Transliteration: "Uirusu Shōgun to Sannin Kyōdai no Isha" (Japanese: ウィルス将軍と三人兄弟の医者)	Yukihiro Miyamoto; Naoyuki Tatsuwa; Hisatoshi Shimizu	Yukihiro Miyamoto; Naoyuki Tatsuwa	February 17, 2010
2	"God Was Washed Away"; Transliteration: "Kami-san ga ryū sa rete kita" (Japanese: 神さんが流されてきた)	Yukihiro Miyamoto; Naoyuki Tatsuwa; Hisatoshi Shimizu	Yukihiro Miyamoto; Naoyuki Tatsuwa	February 17, 2010
2	"The World with Words"; Transliteration: "Kotoba no aru sekai" (Japanese: 言葉のある世界)	Yukihiro Miyamoto; Naoyuki Tatsuwa; Hisatoshi Shimizu	Yukihiro Miyamoto; Naoyuki Tatsuwa	February 17, 2010
After a classroom AED demonstration, Zetsubou-sensei cautions that society misguidedly "revives" various things that have run their course. Heedlessly, Manami does just so, but accidentally revives dead fads and shelved public works, leading to a zombie outbreak. Zetsubou-sensei becomes a zombie, ensuring that this series will continue even after its popularity has run its course. Then, at a wave pool, the class is, one by one, washed away when they submit to the "currents" of peer pressure or sentimentality. Though disdainful of the sequacity of the general public, Zetsubou-sensei is himself washed away by an enchanted encounter with Tane. He becomes a castaway on an island of nonconformists who resist these "currents", such as outsider artists and the tone-deaf. Then, with the arrival of June, Zetsubou-sensei proposes not only changing clothing, but also clothing one's words in euphemisms. The class practices various circumlocutions which turn out to be more disparaging than speaking plainly. Inspired by the creative license taken with foreign film subtitles, Chiri deploys subtitles that liberally "translate" the candid meanings of euphemisms.

== Blu-ray bonus episode ==
Opening theme
"Ringo Mogire Beam!" (林檎もぎれビーム!) - Kenji Ohtsuki and Zetsubō Shōjo-tachi

Ending theme
"Zetsubō Restaurant" (絶望レストラン) - Zetsubō Shōjo-tachi

No.	Title	Directed by	Storyboarded by	Original release date
1	"Despair Fell at the Murder Scene"; Transliteration: "Satsujin Genba ni Zetsubō ga Ochiteita" (Japanese: 殺人現場に絶望が落ちていた)	Yasutoshi Iwasaki; Takashi Kawabata	Yasutoshi Iwasaki	January 2012
1	"The Christ of Nyanjing"; Transliteration: "Nyan-kin no Kirisuto" (Japanese: ニャン京の基督)	Yasutoshi Iwasaki; Takashi Kawabata	Yasutoshi Iwasaki	January 2012
Detective Zetsubou arrives at Maedax's mansion just as the master of the house is found stabbed in a locked room. The detective questions the family, the maids, and visiting entertainers, but despite the victim's disrepute and infamy, everyone's alibi is corroborated. Realizing that he himself has a motive and no alibi, the detective is beguiled by Kafuka into a dramatic confession, but is anticlimactically upstaged by Maedax confessing to his own suicide attempt. Then, on stage, the cast acts out, to a musical refrain, various mondegreens that would change bad things to good—or vice versa. They also show off small additions, omissions, and substitutions that would make large differences, but realize that small changes can also make things uncanny.
