= Hiroki Yamamura =

Japanese animator and character designer

Hiroki Yamamura 山村 洋貴
- Born: February 11, 1981 (age 45); Anjō, Aichi Prefecture, Japan
- Other name: Takahiro Murayama
- Education: Yoyogi Animation Academy
- Occupations: Animator, character designer
- Years active: 2002–present
- Employer(s): Studio Lux (2002–2003); Actas (2003–2004?); Studio Pastoral (2004~2012?); Shaft (2012?–present)
- Known for: And Yet the Town Moves; Fate/Extra: Last Encore; Pretty Boy Detective Club

Hiroki Yamamura (Japanese: 山村洋貴, Hepburn: Yamamura Hiroki; born February 11, 1981) is a Japanese animator, character designer and storyboard artist.

== Career ==
Yamamura is from Anjō, Aichi Prefecture, and graduated from Yoyogi Animation Academy. Initially, he joined eroge game company Studio Lux as an illustrator around 2002 and used the name Takahiro Murayama (むらやまたかひろ), a play on the Hiragana spelling of his name Hiroki Yamamura (やまむらひろき), but left the company in August 2003. After leaving Studio Lux, Yamamura joined Actas briefly before joining newly founded animation production company Studio Pastoral, where he initially did in-between animation and was quickly promoted to key animator in less than a year, and again to animation director by 2005.

While Studio Pastoral itself was a sub-contracting animation firm not producing its own titles, from the very beginning of the studio's history it developed a close relationship to studio Shaft. Yamamura worked on a number of different titles from a number of different studios that were outsourcing work to Studio Pastoral, but he gained prominence within Shaft's works and mainly took on jobs for the studio. In 2007, he was given his first job as a chief animation director on Shaft's adaptation of Sayonara, Zetsubou-Sensei, with characters designed by Hideyuki Morioka— whom Yamamura had worked with on REC (2006) and liked the designs of. Although from different studios–Morioka an employee of Studio Silver–and doing work for a studio neither belonged to (at the time), Morioka and Yamamura have worked together on numerous occasions since Sayonara, Zetsubou Sensei including all of the series' sequels, and the first season of Maria Holic (2009), which Morioka also designed the characters for, and Studio Pastoral assisted in the production of. Yamamura was a fan of Morioka's work and had been attentive to him since before entering the industry, so he tried to incorporate many of Morioka's favorite styles in Maria Holic. As previously mentioned, Yamamura worked on Shaft's gross outsources to Studio Pastoral previously, and had met director Akiyuki Shinbo during the latter-half of the production to Negima!? around 2006. Their first meeting occurred when Yamamura was in the Shaft production studio and he was watching Sasuga no Sarutobi (1982) on DVD, and Shinbo had come up to him to ask if he was watching Sasuga no Sarutobi. Sayonara, Zetsubou-Sensei was Yamamura's first time working directly with Shinbo, however; and as a fan of Shinbo's work, having watched his series for a "long time", Yamamura was initially nervous. In 2010, Yamamura started doing character design work, with his first job as such being Shaft's And Yet the Town Moves; and a year later, he also designed the characters for the Katteni Kaizō OVA, an adaptation of another manga from the author of Sayonara, Zetsubou-Sensei.

Yamamura acted as a chief animation director and animation director for Puella Magi Madoka Magica: The Movie (2012–13 trilogy). For the first two films, which are compilations of the TV series re-edited and with redone animation, Yamamura did most of his chief animation director duties alone as character designer and chief animation director Junichirou Taniguchi was busy with other work. The third film was split into 5 units (lettered as A through E) and Yamamura only acted as chief animation director for the D-part and beginning of the E-part, with Taniguchi handling the rest. Aside from that, he was the animation director for the entirety of the A-part and select sequences from the B- and C-parts (namely those key animated by Yuuya Geshi and Genichirou Abe).

Since 2009, Shaft had started adapting Nisio Isin's Monogatari series of light novels; and when Bakemonogatari, the first season–directed by Shinbo and Tatsuya Oishi, and with character designs by Akio Watanabe–ended, a new adaptation titled Kizumonogatari was announced. However, for several years, Oishi worked on the project and Shinbo invested in Tomoyuki Itamura to continue with other parts of the series, which Yamamura occasionally participated in alongside other series. Eventually, production on the films started with Hideyuki Morioka taking on duties as chief animation director (and character designer, co-credited with Watanabe); and around the spring of 2014, Yamamura joined as the second chief animation director. Eventually, the project was announced to be a film trilogy that premiered in 2016 and 2017. For the first film, Morioka and Yamamura split their duties as animation directors somewhat evenly, with Morioka working on the first half of the film and Yamamura on the second half, or split scene-by-scene. For the second and third films, however, they divvyed up the work based on the characters: Morioka supervised the drawings for the female characters, and Yamamura was in charge of the male characters; and for any particularly important scenes, Oishi assigned them to Yamamura or Morioka. Oishi was adamant about the female characters being "cute" and the male characters being "hot" to appeal to the fans, which coincides with Yamamura's drawing style according to Shinbo's comment that his drawings appeal to women.

In 2018, Yamamura collaborated with Masaaki Takiyama to draw the character designs and supervise the animation to Fate/Extra: Last Encore. In 2020, Yamamura participated as one of the chief animation directors for the first season of Magia Record, helping on 10 of the 13 episodes. Unlike with Kizumonogatari, however, he and Nobuhiro Sugiyama, the other chief animation director helping series character designer Junichirou Taniguchi, did not split the work between time halves or characters. Instead, they divided the work mainly through scene type: Sugiyama supervised the "daily" scenes, while Yamamura focused mainly on the "action" scenes. Yamamura found difficulty in drawing the characters cutely, so he used Sugiyama's supervised parts as references due to a scene in episode 2 that Yamamura thought was impressive. The next year, he designed the characters for an adaptation of another Nisio Isin title, Pretty Boy Detective Club.

Yamamura's employment history during the 2010s is ambiguous. He still belonged to Studio Pastoral as of the 2000s, but Pastoral's relationship with Shaft ended around 2011 or 2012. Whether Yamamura stayed with Pastoral and did work for Shaft, left Pastoral and went freelance (working exclusively with Shaft), or left Pastoral and joined Shaft is not known. However, both he and Shaft veteran animator Genichirou Abe participated on Onimai: I'm Now Your Sister! (2023) with "Shaft" (シャフト) listed parenthetically next to their names in the credits. In early 2023, Yamamura's Twitter account also mentioned him as a part of Shaft.

== Works ==
=== Teleivison series ===
Year	Title	Director(s)	Studio	CD (Note: Character designer.)	CAD (Note: Chief animation director.)	AD (Note: Animation director.)	KA (Note: Key animator.)	Other roles and notes	Ref(s)
2004	Major	Ken'ichi Kasai	Studio Hibari	No	No	No	No	In-between animator	
2004	Tsukuyomi: Moon Phase	Akiyuki Shinbo	Shaft	No	No	No	Yes		
2004	W Wish	Osamu Sekita	Picture Magic; Trinet Entertainment	No	No	No	Yes		
2005	He is My Master	Shouji Saeki	Gainax; Shaft	No	No	No	Yes		
2005	Pani Poni Dash!	Akiyuki Shinbo; Shin Oonuma	Shaft	No	No	No	Yes	Assistant animation director Eyecatch	
2005	Noein	Kazuki Akane	Satelight	No	No	No	Yes		
2006	Lemon Angel Project	Daisuke Chiba	Radix	No	No	No	No	Assistant animation director	
2006	REC	Ryūtarō Nakamura	Shaft	No	No	Yes	Yes		
2006	009-1	Naoyuki Konno	Ishinomori Entertainment	No	No	No	Yes		
2006	Negima!?	Akiyuki Shinbo; Shin Oonuma	Shaft	No	No	Yes	Yes	Assistant animation director	
2007	Sayonara, Zetsubou-Sensei	Akiyuki Shinbo	Shaft	No	Yes	Yes	Yes	Storyboard artist Eyecatch	
2007	Hidamari Sketch	Akiyuki Shinbo; Ryouki Kamitsubo	Shaft	No	No	No	Yes		
2008	Zoku Sayonara, Zetsubou-Sensei	Akiyuki Shinbo; Yukihiro Miyamoto	Shaft	No	Yes	Yes	Yes		
2009	Maria Holic	Akiyuki Shinbo; Yukihiro Miyamoto	Shaft	No	Yes	Yes	No	Assistant animation director	
2009	Zan Sayonara, Zetsubou-Sensei	Akiyuki Shinbo; Yukihiro Miyamoto	Shaft	No	Yes	Yes	Yes		
2009	Bakemonogatari	Akiyuki Shinbo; Tatsuya Oishi	Shaft	No	No	Yes	Yes	Assistant animation director	
2009	Natsu no Arashi! Akinai-chuu	Akiyuki Shinbo; Kenichi Ishikura (8–13)	Shaft	No	No	No	No	Assistant animation director	
2010	And Yet the Town Moves	Akiyuki Shinbo	Shaft	Yes	Yes	Yes	No		
2010	Arakawa Under the Bridge	Akiyuki Shinbo; Yukihiro Miyamoto	Shaft	No	No	Yes	Yes		
2010	Hidamari Sketch x Hoshimittsu	Akiyuki Shinbo; Kenichi Ishikura	Shaft	No	No	Yes	Yes	Storyboard artist Assistant animation director	
2011	Maria Holic Alive	Akiyuki Shinbo; Tomokazu Tokoro	Shaft	No	No	Yes	No		
2011	Guilty Crown	Tetsurō Araki	Production I.G	No	No	Yes	No		
2011	Hidamari Sketch x SP	Akiyuki Shinbo	Shaft	No	No	No	No	Assistant animation director	
2012	Nisemonogatari	Akiyuki Shinbo; Tomoyuki Itamura	Shaft	No	Yes	Yes	No	Assistant animation director	
2012	Hidamari Sketch x Honeycomb	Akiyuki Shinbo; Yuki Yase	Shaft	No	No	Yes	Yes		
2012	Nekomonogatari: Black	Akiyuki Shinbo; Tomoyuki Itamura	Shaft	No	No	Yes	No		
2013	Sasami-san@Ganbaranai	Akiyuki Shinbo	Shaft	No	No	No	No	Assistant animation director	
2013	Monogatari Series Second Season	Akiyuki Shinbo; Tomoyuki Itamura; Naoyuki Tatsuwa; Yuki Yase	Shaft	No	No	Yes	No		
2014	Mekakucity Actors	Akiyuki Shinbo; Yuki Yase	Shaft	No	Yes	Yes	Yes	Assistant chief animation director Assistant animation director	
2018	Fate/Extra: Last Encore	Akiyuki Shinbo; Yukihiro Miyamoto	Shaft	Yes	Yes	No	Yes	Back sponsor screen illustrations	
2019	The Quintessential Quintuplets	Satoshi Kuwabara	Tezuka Productions	No	No	Yes	Yes		
2020	Magia Record	Doroinu; Yukihiro Miyamoto; Kenjirou Okada; Midori Yoshizawa	Shaft	No	Yes	Yes	Yes	Uncredited storyboard copy artist	
2021	Pretty Boy Detective Club	Akiyuki Shinbo; Hajime Ootani	Shaft	Yes	Yes	Yes	Yes	Uncredited 2nd key animator	
2021	Magia Record: The Eve of Awakening	Doroinu; Yukihiro Miyamoto	Shaft	No	No	Yes	Yes		
2022	Magia Record: Dawn of a Shallow Dream	Doroinu; Yukihiro Miyamoto	Shaft	No	No	No	Yes		
2022	RWBY: Ice Queendom	Toshimasa Suzuki; Kenjirou Okada	Shaft	No	Yes	Yes	No		
2022	Luminous Witches	Shouji Saeki	Shaft	No	No	No	No	Assistant animation director Uncredited 2nd key animator	
2023	Onimai	Shingo Fujii	Studio Bind	No	No	No	Yes		
2023	Zom 100: Bucket List of the Dead	Kazuki Kawagoe	Bug Films	No	Yes	No	No		
2023	The Quintessential Quintuplets~	Yukihiro Miyamoto	Shaft	No	No	Yes	Yes		
2025	A Ninja and an Assassin Under One Roof	Yukihiro Miyamoto	Shaft	No	Yes	Yes	Yes	Avant storyboard artist	

=== OVAs/ONAs ===
Year	Title	Director(s)	Studio	CD	CAD	AD	KA	Other roles and notes	Ref(s)
2004	Sakura Wars: The New Paris	Yuusuke Yamamoto	Radix	No	No	No	No	In-between animator	
2004	Tales of Phantasia: The Animation	Takuo Tominaga (1)	Actas	No	No	No	No	In-between animator	
2006	Negima!? Summer Special	Akiyuki Shinbo; Shin Oonuma	Shaft	No	No	No	Yes		
2008	Mahou Sensei Negima: Shiroki Tsubasa Ala Alba	Akiyuki Shinbo; Hiroaki Tomita (1)	Shaft; Studio Pastoral	No	No	No	No	Assistant animation director	
2008	Goku Sayonara, Zetsubou-Sensei	Akiyuki Shinbo; Yukihiro Miyamoto	Shaft	No	Yes	Yes	Yes	Storyboard artist Guest character designer	
2009	Zan Sayonara, Zetsubou-Sensei Bangaichi	Akiyuki Shinbo; Yukihiro Miyamoto	Shaft	No	Yes	Yes	No		
2011	Katteni Kaizō	Akiyuki Shinbo; Naoyuki Tatsuwa	Shaft	Yes	Yes	Yes	No	2nd key animator	
2013	Hidamari Sketch: Sae & Hiro's Graduation Arc	Akiyuki Shinbo; Yuki Yase	Shaft	No	No	No	Yes		
2017	The Beheading Cycle: The Blue Savant and the Nonsense Bearer	Akiyuki Shinbo; Yuki Yase	Shaft	No	Yes	Yes	No		
2024	Monogatari Series Off & Monster Season	Akiyuki Shinbo; Midori Yoshizawa	Shaft	No	Yes	Yes	Yes		

=== Films ===
Year	Title	Director(s)	Studio	CD	CAD	AD	KA	Other roles and notes	Ref(s)
2011	Negima Anime Final	Akiyuki Shinbo	Shaft; Studio Pastoral	No	No	Yes	No		
2012	Puella Magi Madoka Magica: Beginnings	Akiyuki Shinbo; Yukihiro Miyamoto	Shaft	No	Yes	Yes	No		
2012	Puella Magi Madoka Magica: Eternal	Akiyuki Shinbo; Yukihiro Miyamoto	Shaft	No	Yes	Yes	No		
2013	Puella Magi Madoka Magica: Rebellion	Akiyuki Shinbo; Yukihiro Miyamoto	Shaft	No	Yes	Yes	No	Uncredited as animation director	
2016	Kizumonogatari I: Tekketsu	Akiyuki Shinbo; Tatsuya Oishi	Shaft	No	No	Yes	Yes		
2016	Kizumonogatari II: Nekketsu	Akiyuki Shinbo; Tatsuya Oishi	Shaft	No	Yes	No	No		
2017	Kizumonogatari III: Reiketsu	Akiyuki Shinbo; Tatsuya Oishi	Shaft	No	Yes	No	Yes		
2017	Fireworks	Akiyuki Shinbo; Nobuyuki Takeuchi	Shaft	No	Yes	Yes	No	Sub-character designer 2nd key animator	
2026	Puella Magi Madoka Magica: Walpurgisnacht Rising	Akiyuki Shinbo; Yukihiro Miyamoto	Shaft	No	Yes	No	Yes		

== Notes ==
=== Works cited ===
- Misaka, Taiji, ed. (2009). まりあ†ほりっく アニメ公式ガイドブック [Maria Holic Anime Official Guidebook]. Media Factory. ISBN 978-4840129312.
- Shinbo, Akiyuki (2012). 新房語 [Shinbogatari] (in Japanese). Ichijinsha. ISBN 978-4758012591.
- Kizawa, Yukito; Takayama, Atsushi; Saitou, Fusano, eds. (2014). 劇場版魔法やまどかマギカ[新編]叛逆の物語公式ガイドブック only you. [Movie Version Puella Magi Madoka Magica [New Edition] Story of Rebellion Official Guidebook only you.]. Houbunsha. ISBN 978-4832244290.
- Oota, Keiji; Shaft (August 18, 2017). パンフレット 打ち上げ花火、下から見るか?横から見るか? [Pamphlet: Fireworks, Should We See It from the Side or the Bottom?] (in Japanese). Toho.
- Maeda, Hisashi; Nakagami, Yoshikatsu; Kawabata, Takeshi; Nishitani, Nanako (2020). マギアレコード 魔法少女まどか☆マギカ外伝 TVアニメ公式ガイドブック 1巻 [Magia Record Puella Magi Madoka Magica TV Anime Official Guidebook Volume 1] (in Japanese). Houbunsha. ISBN 978-4832272019.
