= Kakushigoto =

Japanese manga series by Kōji Kumeta

- Kakushigoto: My Dad's Secret Ambition
- First tankōbon volume cover, featuring Kakushi (right) and Hime

かくしごと (Kakushigoto)
- Genre: Comedy, slice of life
- Manga
- Written by: Kōji Kumeta
- Published by: Kodansha
- English publisher: NA: Kodansha USA (digital)
- Magazine: Monthly Shōnen Magazine
- Original run: December 4, 2015 – July 6, 2020
- Volumes: 12
- Anime television series
- Directed by: Yūta Murano
- Written by: Takashi Aoshima
- Music by: Yukari Hashimoto
- Studio: Ajiado
- Licensed by: Crunchyroll: SEA: Plus Media Networks Asia
- Original network: BS-NTV, AT-X, Tokyo MX, SUN
- English network: SEA: Aniplus Asia
- Original run: April 2, 2020 – June 18, 2020
- Episodes: 12
- Anime film
- Directed by: Yūta Murano
- Written by: Takashi Aoshima
- Music by: Yukari Hashimoto
- Studio: Ajiado
- Licensed by: Funimation
- Released: July 9, 2021
- Runtime: 78 minutes
- icon

Kakushigoto: My Dad's Secret Ambition (Japanese: かくしごと, Hepburn: Kakushigoto (Note: The title has a double meaning; kakushigoto can also be written as (隠し事; "A secret") or (描く仕事; "A drawing job").)) is a Japanese manga series by Kōji Kumeta. It was serialized in Kodansha's shōnen manga Monthly Shōnen Magazine from December 2015 to July 2020, with its chapters collected in twelve tankōbon volumes. A 12-episode anime television series adaptation produced by Ajiado aired from April to June 2020. A compilation anime film premiered in July 2021.

== Plot ==
Kakushi Goto makes a living drawing ecchi manga, but he fears this secret could drive a wedge between him and his daughter, Hime. Determined to protect their bond, he vows never to reveal his profession. The story follows their life together in Nakameguro, beginning when Hime is 8 years old and continuing until she turns 18.

== Characters ==
=== Gotō household ===
Kakushi Gotō (後藤 可久士, Gotō Kakushi)
Voiced by: Hiroshi Kamiya (Japanese); Howard Wang (English)
Kakushi is a manga artist who runs his own company, G-PRO. Being that his primary work involves ecchi, he is determined to keep his manga artist career a secret from his daughter, Hime. Kakushi is a single father, his wife having disappeared in an accident off the coast of Japan. His name is a pun on one of the Japanese words for 'secret' (かくしごと, Kakushigoto). In the present, he has been in a coma for a year after suffering from an accident at his warehouse job.
Hime Gotō (後藤 姫, Gotō Hime)
Voiced by: Chika Anzai (animated PV), Rie Takahashi (anime) (Japanese); Morgan Lauré (English)
Hime is a sprightly fourth grade elementary school student and daughter to Kakushi. She is also depicted as a third-year high school student in flash-forward segments, who knows of her father's secret, and has been waiting for him to wake up from his coma. Her name is a pun on one of the Japanese words for 'secret' (ひめゴト, himegoto).

=== G-PRO ===
Aogu Shiji (志治 仰, Shiji Aogu)
Voiced by: Taku Yashiro (Japanese); Cris George (English)
Aogu is Kakushi's chief assistant at G-PRO. He often requires instructions from other people, and his name is a reference to this fact; shiji o aogu (指示を仰ぐ; "ask for instructions").
Rasuna Sumita (墨田 羅砂, Sumita Rasuna)
Voiced by: Kiyono Yasuno (Japanese); Tia Ballard (English)
Rasuna is an assistant at G-PRO. She is named after the phrase 'don't drop ink!' (すみ たらす な！, Sumi Tarasu na!).
Ami Kakei (筧 亜美, Kakei Ami)
Voiced by: Ayane Sakura (Japanese); Katelyn Barr (English)
Ami is an assistant at G-PRO. She generally sports a flat, uninterested demeanour; she also keeps secrets of her own, such as her manga artist pen name. Her name is a reference to the kakeiami (カケアミ) style of cross-hatching.
Kakeru Keshi (芥子 駆, Keshi Kakeru)
Voiced by: Ayumu Murase (Japanese); Kevin Thelwell (English)
Kakeru is the newest assistant at G-PRO; his primary duty is to erase mistakes on the manga manuscripts. His name is a reference to erasing, or literally "using an eraser" (消しゴムかける, Keshigomukakeru).
Satsuki Tomaruin (十丸院 五月, Tomaruin Satsuki)
Voiced by: Natsuki Hanae (Japanese); Aaron Dismuke (English)
Tomaruin is the long-suffering editor at Weekly Shōnen Magazine responsible for liaisoning with the G-PRO firm. He repeatedly drops off manga materials at the Goto home, threatening to reveal Kakushi's secret to his daughter. He is regarded as a ditz, and once mistaken for a pervert; however, he generally means well. He has a crush on Nadila. His name is a reference to the phrase tomaru insatsuki (止まる印刷機; "Stop the presses").

=== Other characters ===
Nadila (ナディラ, Nadira)
Voiced by: Emiri Katō (Japanese); Risa Mei (English)
Nadila is an Indonesian migrant worker who occasionally comes to clean the Goto home. She teaches Hime how to cook Indonesian food, befuddling her father. In another segment, Tomaruin mistakes her for a dukun.
Ichiko Rokujo (六條 一子, Rokujō Ichiko)
Voiced by: Maaya Uchida (Japanese); Lindsay Seidel (English)
Rokujo is Hime's elementary school teacher. She is a fan of Kakushi's work and always helping him keep his secret to Hime. She is named after the number 61 (六十一, Roku Jū Ichi).
Naru Senda (千田 奈留, Senda Naru)
Voiced by: Rikako Aida (Japanese); Emi Lo (English)
Senda is a 17-year-old high school student and aspiring idol. She is also work as a volunteer art instructor and very closed to Hime after she being a fan of her. Her name is a pun that means "I want to be the center of an idol group".
Kairi Imashigata (戒潟 魁吏, Imashigata Kairi)
Voiced by: Akio Otsuka
Imashigata is Kakushi's wealthy father-in-law, who has been at loggerheads with him seemingly ever since his daughter passed away. However, it is shown he still cares for Hime, going so far as to buying her a grand piano when she wants to practice.

== Media ==
=== Manga ===
Written and illustrated by Kōji Kumeta, Kakushigoto was serialized in Kodansha's shōnen manga magazine Monthly Shōnen Magazine from December 4, 2015, to July 6, 2020. Kodansha collected its chapters in twelve tankōbon volumes, released from June 17, 2016, to July 17, 2020.

In March 2020, Kodansha USA announced the acquisition of the manga for an English language digital release, with the first volume being released on March 17, 2020, and the last on February 9, 2021.

=== Anime ===
An anime television series adaptation was announced on the tenth volume of the manga on November 15, 2019. The series was animated by Ajiado and directed by Yūta Murano, with Takashi Aoshima handling series composition, Shuuhei Yamamoto designing the characters, and Yukari Hashimoto composing the series' music. It aired from April 2 to June 18, 2020, on BS-NTV, AT-X, Tokyo MX, and SUN. The opening theme song is "Chiisana Hibi" (ちいさな日々) by Flumpool, while the ending theme is Eiichi Ohtaki's 1981 song "Kimi wa Tennen Shoku" (君は天然色).

Funimation acquired the series and streamed it on their website, AnimeLab, and Wakanim, as well as producing an English dub. Following Sony's acquisition of Crunchyroll, the series was moved to Crunchyroll.

==== Episodes ====
No.	Title (Note: All English titles are taken from Funimation.)	Original release date
1	"Secrets"; Transliteration: "Kakushigoto" (Japanese: かくしごと)	April 2, 2020
1	"Wishes"; Transliteration: "Negaigoto" (Japanese: ねがいごと)	April 2, 2020
18-year-old Hime Gotō discovers a hidden building containing manga manuscripts by her father, Kakushi. The story flashes back eight years to when Hime is 10. Kakushi, an ecchi manga artist, hides his profession to avoid alienating her—storing his work off-site, disguising his office, and dressing formally. When his editor, Satsuki Tomaruin, visits their home unexpectedly, Kakushi alters his manga-themed shirt to avoid detection. After Kakushi rescues a cat in public, Hime writes a school assignment wishing for him to "become important", inspired by a friend's views on success. This distresses Kakushi, as recognition would expose his secret. Consulting his assistants (Aogu Shiji, Ami Kakei, and Kakeru Keshi), he struggles with the dilemma. Hime later searches for the cat's rescuer but is misled by a local legend. That night, she explains she wanted his happiness; Kakushi responds that her well-being is what truly matters.
2	"Beach Sandals and B4"; Transliteration: "Bīsan to Bī-yon" (Japanese: ビーサンとB4)	April 9, 2020
2	"Don't Place, Don't Draw, Don't Finish Up"; Transliteration: "Okanai Kakanai Shiagenai" (Japanese: おかない かかない しあげない)	April 9, 2020
Kakushi and his G-PRO team distract themselves by making gyoza as a deadline approaches. When Hime goes on a school beach trip, Kakushi secretly follows to protect her, causing misunderstandings with teacher Ichiko. He later notices Hime struggling when classmates ask about her mother. At a summer festival, Kakushi buys all merchandise featuring his manga characters to hide his profession, unintentionally making them more popular. This leads to police suspecting G-PRO's stockpiled goods are dangerous, until Rasuna clarifies they are manga props. Hime discovers unused birthday yukata in old gift boxes and requests a custom dress, prompting Kakushi to learn sewing. Years later, 18-year-old Hime finds Kakushi's hidden manga manuscripts in Kamakura. The storage contains unopened birthday gifts up to her 20th year, mirroring their former Nakameguro home.
3	"Makeshift Circus"; Transliteration: "Yarikuri Sākasu" (Japanese: やりくりサーカス)	April 16, 2020
3	"The True State of Manga and Muscles"; Transliteration: "Manga no Jitsujō to Kinniku" (Japanese: 漫画の実情と筋肉)	April 16, 2020
4	"Normale Namae"; Transliteration: "Norumae Namae" (Japanese: ノルマエ・ナマエ)	April 23, 2020
4	"Komawari Sketch"; Transliteration: "Komawari Sukecchi" (Japanese: コマ割りスケッチ)	April 23, 2020
5	"And Yet Everyone Gets Their Turn in the End"; Transliteration: "Soredemo Hachi wa Mawattekuru" (Japanese: それでも鉢は廻ってくる)	April 30, 2020
5	"You're Spending the Night!"; Transliteration: "Tometane!" (Japanese: 泊めたねっ！)	April 30, 2020
Following Satsuki's suggestion, Kakushi reluctantly judges a manga contest. He practices by reviewing Kakeru's work before receiving applicants' submissions at home, which he directs to the office. Satsuki adds smiley faces to Kakushi's serious feedback, drawing criticism for appearing insincere. When Hime asks about responsibilities, Kakushi states his duty is raising her well, inspiring her to request a puppy. When G-PRO's work fails quality checks, Satsuki books Kakushi a hotel stay to meet the 5 AM deadline. G-PRO arrives to help, misunderstanding it as a bathrobe party. Meanwhile, Hime hosts Naru and Nadila overnight, joined later by Ichiko and Satsuki after repeated misunderstandings. The next day, Hime awards Kakushi a handmade medal for being her everything. In the future, 18-year-old Hime discovers Kakushi has prepared gift boxes for each of her ages and embraces one emotionally.
6	"School Rucksack"; Transliteration: "Sukūru Randoseru" (Japanese: スクールランドセル)	May 7, 2020
7	"Inuhoshiki: Dog Wanted"; Transliteration: "Inu Hoshiki" (Japanese: いぬほしき)	May 14, 2020
7	"The One Who Connects Mother and Child"; Transliteration: "Boshi o Tsugu Mono" (Japanese: 母子を継ぐ者)	May 14, 2020
8	"Our Rough Draft"; Transliteration: "Oretachi no Shitagaki" (Japanese: おれたちの下描き)	May 21, 2020
8	"Unfortunate Memories Club"; Transliteration: "Zan'nen Kinen-Gumi" (Japanese: 残念記念組)	May 21, 2020
9	"Your Lie in December"; Transliteration: "Shiwasu wa Kimi no Uso" (Japanese: 師走は君の嘘)	May 28, 2020
10	"I"S（Izu）"; Transliteration: "I"S（Izu）" (Japanese: I"S（伊豆）)	June 4, 2020
As the year ends, Kakushi pushes G-PRO to complete two manga issues early for a holiday break. Lacking motivation, he regains focus when Hime wins a hot springs trip to Izu. After finishing the work, Kakushi falls ill and is swarmed by concerned friends—waking to find his room filled with marriage proposals. At the onsen inn, Kakushi enlists Rasuna and Aogu to watch Hime, though she finishes bathing before they arrive. Investigating a sealed room, Kakushi learns it is being remodeled from where a literary classic was written. During a dinner where guests share secrets, a scream interrupts Kakushi's near-confession—later revealed to be a civet, not the rumored author's ghost. Mistaken for the ghost while working, Kakushi frightens local boys. In the present, Hime recalls Kakushi's career change. Rasuna and Satsuki discuss his resignation as a newspaper shows a report about people lost at sea.
11	"Saishukai: The Last Chapter Doesn't Bother Her"; Transliteration: "Saishūkai Heiki Kanojo" (Japanese: 最終回平気彼女)	June 11, 2020
12	"Hidden Truths"; Transliteration: "Himegoto" (Japanese: ひめごと)	June 18, 2020
In the present, Hime meets a boy claiming to be her half-uncle, revealing Kakushi is the illegitimate son of a kabuki actor—explaining her grandfather's disdain. Meanwhile, Naru Senda investigates and learns Kakushi was hospitalized after being crushed by mangazines at his new job, having quit manga when tabloids exposed his search for his missing wife. At Tokyo Women's Medical University Hospital, Kakushi awakens with amnesia, believing Hime is still 10. He resumes drawing his canceled series Tights, mistaking the 18-year-old Hime for an assistant. Hime and Ichiko debate whether restoring his memories would halt his artistic revival. Hime shows Kakushi his old manuscripts, triggering his recognition of her. He admits his true happiness lies in seeing her grown, not in drawing. In the aftermath, Hime secretly begins her own manga while Kakushi pitches a new series, reuniting G-PRO.

=== Film ===
On December 12, 2020, it was announced that the series would receive a theatrical compilation film. The film premiered on July 9, 2021. Funimation streamed the film.

== Reception ==
In 2017, the series was ranked 18th at the third Next Manga Awards in the print category.
