= Go!! Southern Ice Hockey Club =

Japanese manga series by Kōji Kumeta

- First tankōbon volume cover

行け!!南国アイスホッケー部 (Yuke!! Nangoku Aisu Hokkē-bu)
- Genre: Comedy; Sports
- Manga
- Written by: Kōji Kumeta
- Published by: Shogakukan
- Imprint: Shōnen Sunday Comics
- Magazine: Weekly Shōnen Sunday
- Original run: April 3, 1991 – August 7, 1996
- Volumes: 23

Go!! Southern Ice Hockey Club (Japanese: 行け!!南国アイスホッケー部, Hepburn: Yuke!! Nangoku Aisu Hokkē-bu) is a Japanese manga series written and illustrated by Kōji Kumeta. It was serialized in Shogakukan's shōnen manga magazine Weekly Shōnen Sunday from April 1991 to August 1996, with its chapters collected in 23 tankōbon volumes.

== Plot ==
The series follows Getto Rando, who has been living in Canada and playing hockey there since he was ten. However, he also earned himself a very long suspension due to cheating and thus was more or less forced to return to Japan where he was recruited by Hamatsu High School in Kyushu, even though ice hockey is not popular in southern Japan and the school only has a roller hockey rink.

== Characters ==
Getto Rando (蘭堂 月斗, Getto Randō)
A very skilled hockey player and has won multiple scoring titles in Canadian leagues of his age group. However, he is not afraid to go outside the rulebook to achieve victory.
Soara Okamoto (岡本 そあら, Okamoto Soara)
Soara is the manager of the hockey team. She is a bit uptight and constantly has to keep Getto and the rest of the hockey club in check.
Kentaro Amakusa (天草 健太郎, Amakusa Kentarō)
The coach of the hockey team, Kentaro was the former captain until his need for glasses sidelined him.
Maiko Asakiri (朝霧 舞子, Asakiri Maiko)
Maiko is one of the most voluptuous girls in school and holds the title of Miss Hamatsu High. She is close friends with Soara.
Rob Doorman (ロブ・ドールマン, Robu Dōruman)
A former teammate of Getto from Canada. Rob becomes an exchange student and finds himself at Hamatsu High School. Like Getto he was suspended from the leagues in Canada. He was banned for his violent outbreaks.
Yoshida (吉田)
The gentle giant of the hockey club. He is a timid guy and is often taken advantage of or made fun of by the other members of the hockey club, despite the strength he possesses.

== Publication ==
Go!! Southern Ice Hockey Club is written and illustrated by Kōji Kumeta. It was serialized in Shogakukan's Weekly Shōnen Sunday from April 3, 1991, to August 7, 1996. Shogakukan compiled its individual chapters in 23 tankōbon volumes, released from January 18, 1992, to November 18, 1996. Shogakukan re-released the series into eleven wideban volumes, published from December 16, 2000, to August 9, 2002.

=== Volumes ===
| No. | Japanese release date | Japanese ISBN |
|---|---|---|
| 1 | January 18, 1992 | 4-09-122681-7 |
| 2 | April 17, 1992 | 4-09-122682-5 |
| 3 | May 18, 1992 | 4-09-122683-3 |
| 4 | July 17, 1992 | 4-09-122684-1 |
| 5 | September 18, 1992 | 4-09-122685-X |
| 6 | December 12, 1992 | 4-09-122686-8 |
| 7 | March 18, 1993 | 4-09-122687-6 |
| 8 | May 18, 1993 | 4-09-122688-4 |
| 9 | July 17, 1993 | 4-09-122689-2 |
| 10 | October 18, 1993 | 4-09-122690-6 |
| 11 | December 11, 1993 | 4-09-123301-5 |
| 12 | March 18, 1994 | 4-09-123302-3 |
| 13 | June 18, 1994 | 4-09-123303-1 |
| 14 | September 17, 1994 | 4-09-123304-X |
| 15 | December 10, 1994 | 4-09-123305-8 |
| 16 | March 18, 1995 | 4-09-123306-6 |
| 17 | July 18, 1995 | 4-09-123307-4 |
| 18 | November 18, 1995 | 4-09-123308-2 |
| 19 | March 18, 1996 | 4-09-123309-0 |
| 20 | June 18, 1996 | 4-09-123310-4 |
| 21 | August 10, 1996 | 4-09-125071-8 |
| 22 | October 18, 1996 | 4-09-125072-6 |
| 23 | November 18, 1996 | 4-09-125073-4 |
