= Katteni Kaizō =

Japanese manga series

- Cover of the first manga volume

かってに改蔵
- Genre: Comedy
- Manga
- Written by: Kōji Kumeta
- Published by: Shogakukan
- Imprint: Shōnen Sunday Comics
- Magazine: Weekly Shōnen Sunday
- Original run: May 6, 1998 – August 4, 2004
- Volumes: 26
- Original video animation
- Directed by: Akiyuki Shinbo (chief); Naoyuki Tatsuwa
- Produced by: Junnosuke Miyamoto
- Written by: Katsuhiko Takayama; Shaft (Note: Credited under the collective pen name Fuyashi Tō.)
- Music by: Ruka Kawada
- Studio: Shaft
- Released: May 23, 2011 – October 26, 2011
- Runtime: 23 minutes each
- Episodes: 6

Katteni Kaizō (かってに改蔵; "Arbitrary Kaizō") is a Japanese manga series written and illustrated by Kōji Kumeta. It was serialized in Shogakukan's Weekly Shōnen Sunday from May 1998 to August 2004, with its chapters collected in 26 tankōbon volumes. An original video animation (OVA) series adaptation produced by Shaft was released from May to October 2011.

== Plot ==
The series follows the strange goings-on that surround Kaizō Katsu, an eccentric student who has a unique perspective on the world around him. He was once a child prodigy but at the age of 7, his childhood friend Umi Natori kicked him off the jungle gym and he suffered a head trauma, changing his personality. He gained a huge interest in various weird things such as UFOs and ghosts.

At 17, Kaizō was hit by a human anatomy model that accidentally dropped from the second floor of the school building. Being revived with a defibrillator, he starts to believe he was rebuilt as a cyborg by the president of the science club, Suzu Saien, who facilitates that belief for her own entertainment. Kaizō joins the science club and becomes a constant annoyance to Umi and also the bane of the existence of another member of the club, Chitan Tsubouchi.

At the time of his accident at the age of 7, Kaizō was also attending the Genius Cram School, a local institute for prodigies in various fields like sleeping or fashion. However, after the accident a dazed Kaizō destroyed the building by inadvertently mixing dangerous chemicals. Now the science club constantly runs into people that also used to attend that same cram school and display even more eccentric behavior than Kaizō himself.

== Characters ==
Kaizō Katsu (勝 改蔵, Katsu Kaizō)
Voiced by: Takahiro Sakurai
A 17-year-old Junior in high school, Kaizō has led an interesting life. A former genius, Kaizō's life changed the day his friend Umi kicked him off the jungle gym at the local playground. Ever since that day he's become an eccentric young man who believes that aliens and conspiracy theories are around every corner. Recently he believes that he has been turned into a cyborg by Suzu. Many times, his strange ideas are actually true.
Umi Natori (名取 羽美, Natori Umi)
Voiced by: Eri Kitamura
Umi has been friends with Kaizō for a long time and is in fact to blame for his strange behavior. Even though she feels some guilt over what happened, she cannot bring herself to admit what she did. In the beginning of the series, she seems fairly normal, but as it develops she is revealed to be a quite disturbed character. She is somewhat romantically interested in Kaizō, and likes cursing people.
Suzu Saien (彩園 すず, Saien Suzu)
Voiced by: Aki Toyosaki
Suzu is the head of the Science Club and the only Senior in the group. Upon meeting the eccentric Kaizō she decides to indulge his belief that she has turned him into a cyborg. She often appears indifferent to the strange things that occurs, or regards them with mild interest.
Chitan Tsubouchi (坪内 地丹, Tsubouchi Chitan)
Voiced by: Chiwa Saito
The smallest member of the Science Club who is instantly recognizable by his thick glasses. Chitan is pretty much everyone's personal punching bag, and was decided to be an "underling" by Kaizō, a role that Chitan more often than not actually slips into. He can often be seen wearing weird "underling suits". He also likes trains very much.
Yamada-san (山田さん)
Voiced by: Yui Horie
The class president, known for her beauty. She apparently hates her first name and refuses to reveal it, and has an addiction to yakisoba bread. She is also homeless, skint, eats anything, and can be seen popping up in weird places together with her strange mother.
Arumi Haku (泊 亜留美, Haku Arumi)
Chitan's junior at his part time job. Chitan aims to be close to her, but instead ends up following her around and stalking her. Afraid of her stalker, she is comforted by Chitan, not knowing that he is the stalker himself.
Satan Tsubouchi (坪内 砂丹, Tsubouchi Satan)
Chitan's twin brother, but without Chitan's personality faults. At his first appearance, he is identical to Chitan except for his skin tone. As the series progresses, he grows taller and more good-looking, at the same rate as Chitan grows smaller and uglier. Is friends with Kaizō, or maybe more (?).
Michiko Kanzaki (神崎 美智子, Kanzaki Michiko)
One of Kaizō's class mates. An otaku who refuses to reveal that she is one, but she often slips and reveals herself. Her whole family are otaku as well.
Jun (ジュン)
Suzu's self-crowned nemesis. Used to be in a pop-group with Suzu until Suzu quit, leaving Jun stranded in Tokyo after moving there from Osaka. She now seeks revenge for that on Suzu.
Yoshiko-sensei (よし子先生)
Kaizō's home room teacher. A single woman, 26 years old. Wears sailor fuku in school.
Yoshida (吉田)
The principal of Kaizō's high school. He is a masochist, and has his own dungeon in the school. Seems to enjoy many of Kaizō's delusional ideas.
The neighbourhood manga artist who doesn't sell (売れない近所のまんが家)
Kumeta's self insert. He is tormented by his editors, his manga does not sell, and he is very bitter. He becomes more and more broken as the series goes on.

== Media ==
=== Manga ===
Katteni Kaizō is written and illustrated by Kōji Kumeta. It was serialized in Shogakukan's Weekly Shōnen Sunday from May 6, 1998, to August 4, 2004. Shogakukan collected its chapters in twenty-six tankōbon volumes, released from January 18, 1999, to September 17, 2004. In 2010, Shogakukan started re-releasing the manga in a 14-volume shinsōban edition, to celebrate Kumeta's 20th anniversary as a manga creator. The volumes were published from April 16, 2010, to June 17, 2011.

==== Volumes ====
No.	Release date	ISBN
1	January 18, 1999	4-09-125531-0
2	March 18, 1999	4-09-125532-9
3	May 18, 1999	4-09-125533-7
4	July 17, 1999	4-09-125534-5
5	October 18, 1999	4-09-125535-3
6	January 18, 2000	4-09-125536-1
7	April 18, 2000	4-09-125537-X
8	July 18, 2010	4-09-125538-8
9	October 18, 2000	4-09-125539-6
10	December 18, 2000	4-09-125540-X
11	March 17, 2001	4-09-126171-X
12	June 18, 2001	4-09-126172-8
13	September 18, 2001	4-09-126173-6
14	December 18, 2001	4-09-126174-4
15	March 18, 2002	4-09-126175-2
16	May 18, 2002	4-09-126176-0
17	August 9, 2002	4-09-126177-9
18	November 18, 2002	4-09-126178-7
19	January 18, 2003	4-09-126179-5
20	March 18, 2003	4-09-126180-9
21	June 18, 2010	4-09-126461-1
22	August 18, 2003	4-09-126462-X
23	December 18, 2012	4-09-126463-8; 4-09-159022-5 (LE)
24	March 18, 2004	4-09-126464-6
25	June 18, 2004	4-09-126465-4
26	September 17, 2004	4-09-126466-2

=== Original video animation ===
In January 2011, an original video animation (OVA) adaptation of the series was announced. Three volumes, each one including two episodes, were released from May 25 to October 26, 2011.

The series was directed by Naoyuki Tatsuwa under the chief direction of Akiyuki Shinbo at Shaft. The series was written by Katsuhiko Takayama and Shaft, features character designs from Hiroki Yamamura (at the time from Studio Pastoral), and has music by Ruka Kawada. The episodes are split into segments, and some episode's segments were outsourced to other studios: episode 2 and 6's B-parts were outsourced to Studio Pastoral, and episode 5's A and B-parts were outsourced to Asahi Production. Yamamura also served as chief animation director across the series, and Yuka Kudou also acted as chief animation director for episode 5's A and B parts.

=== Episodes ===
No.	Title	Directed by (Note: Information is taken from the ending credits of each episode.)	Storyboarded by	Original release date
1	"Volume 1"	Naoyuki Tatsuwa	Naoyuki Tatsuwa (A); Yasutoshi Iwasaki (B)	May 23, 2011
2	"Volume 2"	Naoyuki Tatsuwa (AB); Yasutoshi Iwasaki (C)	Naoyuki Tatsuwa (AB); Yasutoshi Iwasaki (C)	May 25, 2011
3	"Volume 3"	Naoyuki Tatsuwa	Kenichi Imaizumi (AB); Ryou Imamura (C)	August 8, 2011
4	"Volume 4"	Naoyuki Tatsuwa (A); Hajime Ootani (BC)	Ryou Imamura (A); Hajime Ootani (BC)	August 10, 2011
5	"Volume 5"	Hajime Ootani (AB); Naoyuki Tatsuwa (CD)	Kazuhiro Soeta (A); Akira Hashimoto (B); Naoyuki Tatsuwa (C); Yasutoshi Iwasaki (D)	October 26, 2011
6	"Volume 6"	Naoyuki Tatsuwa (AD); Takashi Kawabata (BC)	Naoyuki Tatsuwa (ACD); Takashi Kawabata (B); Yoshiharu Ashino (C, song part)	October 26, 2011
