= Kōji Kumeta =

Japanese manga artist

Kōji Kumeta (久米田 康治, Kumeta Kōji; born September 5, 1967) is a Japanese manga artist. His most famous works are Go!! Southern Ice Hockey Club, Katteni Kaizō, Sayonara, Zetsubou-Sensei, and Joshiraku. The bulk of Kumeta's work was published in Weekly Shōnen Sunday, until the abrupt cancellation of Katteni Kaizō, which resulted in him transferring from Shogakukan to Kodansha. As of 2014, he has gone freelance. His most recent serializations were Studio Pulp for Rakuen Le Paradis of Hakusensha and Kakushigoto in Monthly Shōnen Magazine, both of which concluded their run in 2020.

Sayonara, Zetsubou-Sensei was his first work to be adapted into an anime and was awarded the 31st Kodansha Manga Award in the shōnen category.

== Works ==
=== Manga ===
- Go!! Southern Ice Hockey Club (行け!!南国アイスホッケー部, Yuke!! Nangoku Ice Hockey-bu), 1991–1996, Weekly Shōnen Sunday, Shogakukan)
- √P Root Paradise (√P ルートパラダイス)
- Sodatte Darling!! (育ってダーリン!!)
- The Sun's Soldier Poka Poka (太陽の戦士ポカポカ, Taiyō no Senshi Poka Poka)
- Katteni Kaizō (かってに改蔵), 1998–2004, Weekly Shōnen Sunday, Shogakukan)
- Sayonara, Zetsubou-Sensei (さよなら絶望先生), 2005–2012, Weekly Shōnen Magazine, Kodansha)
- Joshiraku (じょしらく), story, 2009–2013, Bessatsu Shōnen Magazine, Kodansha)
- Sekkachi Hakushaku to Jikan dorobō (せっかち伯爵と時間どろぼう)
- Studio Pulp (スタジオパルプ, Sutajio Parupu)
- Kakushigoto (かくしごと), 2015–2020, Monthly Shōnen Magazine, Kodansha)
- Nankuru Neesan (なんくる姉さん), story
- Shibuya Near Family (シブヤニアファミリー), 2021–present, Weekly Shōnen Sunday, Shogakukan)

=== Anime ===
- The Eccentric Family (有頂天家族), original character design

== Assistants ==
- Kenjiro Hata
- Maeda-kun (also known as MAEDAX, MAEDAX G, MAEDAX Roman)
