= Sayonara, Zetsubou-Sensei =

Japanese manga series

- First tankōbon volume cover, featuring Nozomu Itoshiki

さよなら絶望先生 (Sayonara Zetsubō Sensei)
- Genre: Black comedy; Satire
- Manga
- Written by: Kōji Kumeta
- Published by: Kodansha
- English publisher: NA: Del Rey Manga (former); Kodansha USA
- Imprint: Shōnen Magazine Comics
- Magazine: Weekly Shōnen Magazine
- Original run: April 27, 2005 – June 13, 2012
- Volumes: 30
Further information
Anime television series
Directed by	Akiyuki Shinbo; Naoyuki Tatsuwa (Note: Assistant Director (副監督). See the Shaft director credits legend.)
Produced by	Atsushi Moriyama
Written by	Kenichi Kanemaki
Music by	Tomoki Hasegawa
Studio	Shaft
Licensed by	NA: Nozomi Entertainment
Original network	TVK, CTC, TV Saitama, Sun TV, Tokyo MX, TV Aichi, KBS, Kids Station
Original run	July 7, 2007 – September 22, 2007
Episodes	12
Anime television series
Zoku Sayonara Zetsubou-Sensei
Directed by	Akiyuki Shinbo; Naoyuki Tatsuwa; Yukihiro Miyamoto (Note: Chief Episode Director (チーフ演出).)
Produced by	Atsushi Moriyama
Written by	Shaft (Note: Credited under the collective pen name Fuyashi Tō.) (Note: Credited as Composition (構成, Kōsei).); Yūichirō Oguro
Music by	Tomoki Hasegawa
Studio	Shaft
Licensed by	NA: Nozomi Entertainment
Original network	TVK, CTC, TV Saitama, Sun TV, Tokyo MX, TV Aichi, KBS, BS11 Digital, Kids Station
Original run	January 5, 2008 – March 29, 2008
Episodes	13
Original video animation
Goku Sayonara Zetsubou-Sensei
Directed by	Akiyuki Shinbo; Naoyuki Tatsuwa; Yukihiro Miyamoto
Produced by	Atsushi Moriyama; Hiroaki Morita; Masayuki Haryu
Written by	Shaft; Akiyuki Shinbo
Music by	Tomoki Hasegawa
Studio	Shaft
Licensed by	NA: Nozomi Entertainment
Released	October 17, 2008 – February 17, 2009
Runtime	24–25 minutes
Episodes	3
Anime television series
Zan Sayonara, Zetsubou-Sensei
Directed by	Akiyuki Shinbo; Naoyuki Tatsuwa; Yukihiro Miyamoto
Produced by	Junnosuke Miyamoto
Written by	Shaft; Akiyuki Shinbo
Music by	Tomoki Hasegawa
Studio	Shaft
Licensed by	NA: Nozomi Entertainment
Original network	TVK, CTC, TV Saitama, Sun TV, Tokyo MX, TV Aichi, KBS, BS11 Digital
Original run	July 4, 2009 – September 26, 2009
Episodes	13
Original video animation
Zan Sayonara, Zetsubou-Sensei Bangaichi
Directed by	Akiyuki Shinbo; Naoyuki Tatsuwa; Yukihiro Miyamoto
Produced by	Junnosuke Miyamoto
Written by	Shaft; Akiyuki Shinbo
Music by	Tomoki Hasegawa
Studio	Shaft
Licensed by	NA: Nozomi Entertainment
Released	November 17, 2009 – February 17, 2010
Runtime	26–28 minutes
Episodes	2
Original video animation
Sayonara, Zetsubou-Sensei Special
Directed by	Akiyuki Shinbo; Naoyuki Tatsuwa
Produced by	Junnosuke Miyamoto
Written by	Shaft; Akiyuki Shinbo
Music by	Tomoki Hasegawa
Studio	Shaft
Released	January 31, 2012
Runtime	27 minutes
Episodes	1
- icon

Sayonara, Zetsubou-Sensei (Japanese: さよなら絶望先生, Hepburn: Sayonara Zetsubō Sensei; lit. 'Goodbye, Mr. Despair') is a Japanese manga series written and illustrated by Kōji Kumeta. It was serialized in Kodansha's shōnen manga magazine Weekly Shōnen Magazine from April 2005 to June 2012, with its chapters collected in 30 tankōbon volumes. The series follows Nozomu Itoshiki, a teacher who takes all aspects of life, world, and culture in the most negative light possible. The series satirizes politics, media, and Japanese society.

The manga was adapted into three anime television series and two sets of original video animations (OVAs) animated by Shaft between 2007 and 2010.

The manga has had over 5 million copies in circulation. In 2007, Sayonara, Zetsubou-Sensei received the 31st Kodansha Manga Award for the shōnen category.

== Plot and setting ==
Sayonara, Zetsubou-Sensei features comedic sketches, mostly standalone with very loose continuity, playing out between high school teacher Nozomu Itoshiki and his class of 32 students, class 2-He. As a teacher, Nozomu is addressed as "Zetsubou-sensei", a sobriquet which ironically shows respect for his profession while inauspiciously corrupting the kanji writing of his name so that it is read as "despair". True to this name, Zetsubou-sensei views many aspects of life fatalistically, carrying a resigned attitude that undermines both his authority and work ethic. He habitually interrupts lessons to make various defeatist arguments, which he proceeds to validate by threatening suicide or by leading the class off on tangents, whether in or outside of the classroom. His negative outlooks are always gainsaid by Kafuka Fuura, a student who presents as relentlessly optimistic, though her positive outlooks are even further afield or, ironically, cynical in comparison.

While Zetsubou-sensei's students are unimpressed with his demeanor, they generally play along in group discussions that contribute many examples supporting the topics of his rants. Despite disrespecting him, many of the girls in the class nevertheless carry torches for him, while being disappointed by his lack of reciprocal interest. On many occasions, the girls openly defy his authority and treat him as their possession, backed by wanton slapstick violence committed against both him and each other. Chief among his pursuers is Chiri Kitsu, who is not only obstinate and dictatorial towards the entire class and world, but also prone to bloodthirsty and deranged rampages. Zetsubou-sensei's torment at the hands of the class is often orchestrated by Kafuka, who underhandedly pulls strings to inflame the other girls' passions and jealousy, inviting disastrous results.

Each chapter or episode of the series revolves around a particular aspect of life, Japanese culture, or a common phrase in the Japanese language. Typically, this involves the subject being taken either to its most logical extreme (a discussion of amakudari, the practice of "descending" from the public to the private sector, results in Nozomu "descending" until he reaches his previous life), or taken literally (in Nozomu's family, omiai, normally a meeting between a potential match in an arranged marriage, is instead a marriage made official by eye-contact). On other occasions, Nozomu challenges his students to think about the negative aspects of something usually considered positive. These in-depth, off-kilter analyses (along with the reactions of the students according to their own personality quirks) are usually brought to a head with a punchline based on the overall premise, or more rarely, a non-sequitur gag or piece of fan service.

While the manga is set in the 2000s, it makes numerous references to contemporary events and media. However, it simultaneously uses a variety of aesthetic tropes that evoke the Taishō period, that being the relatively liberal period in Japan before the rise of militarism in the Shōwa period. The story is set in the fictitious "Koishikawa ward" of Tokyo, whereas the real-life Koishikawa has not been one of the special wards of Tokyo since the 1940s. Many aesthetic aspects are meant to evoke Taishō liberalism, Taishō Romanticism (see Japanese literature), and Taishō arts (see Hanshinkan Modernism). This is exemplified by Nozomu and Matoi consistently wearing a kimono and hakama (an obsolete style of Japanese school uniforms in the late 1800s), but is also evident in stylistic choices such as the anachronistic appearance of architecture, vehicles, and technology indicative of the Taishō period. However, the fashion of women typically follows the modern girl trend, which is a break from the Meiji period and signifies the style of the Taishō period.

Chapter titles are oblique references to literature, modified to suit the needs of the chapter. The chapter title pages are drawn to resemble karuta cards, with an illustration in a silhouetted kiri-e style. The anime carries this further through a washed-out, grainy visual style that mimics film, and frequent use of katakana (rather than hiragana) as okurigana. The anime also regularly refers to the date as though Emperor Hirohito were still alive, such that Heisei 20 (the twentieth year of Emperor Akihito's reign, or 2008 by the Gregorian calendar) becomes "Shōwa 83".

== Media ==
=== Manga ===
Sayonara, Zetsubou-Sensei is written and illustrated by Kōji Kumeta. It was serialized in Kodansha's shōnen manga magazine Weekly Shōnen Magazine from April 27, 2005, to June 13, 2012. Kodansha collected its chapters in 30 tankōbon volumes, released from September 16, 2005, to August 17, 2012.

In North America, the manga was licensed for English release by Del Rey Manga. Eight volumes were released from February 24, 2009, to November 23, 2010. The series was license rescued by Kodansha USA in 2010. They released volume 9–14 from June 21, 2011, to April 3, 2012.

=== Anime ===
Sayonara, Zetsubou-Sensei was adapted into a 12-episode anime television series, directed by Akiyuki Shinbo and animated by Shaft. It aired in Japan on TV Kanagawa and other networks between July 7 and September 23, 2007. The first opening theme is "Hito Toshite Jiku ga Bureteiru" (人として軸がぶれている; "As a Human, I'm Quite Warped"), performed by Kenji Ohtsuki featuring Ai Nonaka, Marina Inoue, Yū Kobayashi, Miyuki Sawashiro and Ryōko Shintani. The second opening theme is "Gōin ni Mai Yeah" (強引niマイYeah～), performed by Ai Nonaka, Marina Inoue, Yū Kobayashi, Miyuki Sawashiro and Ryōko Shintani. The ending theme is "Zessei Bijin" (絶世美人; "Absolute Beauty"), performed by Ai Nonaka, Marina Inoue, Yū Kobayashi and Ryōko Shintani. A special 50-minute DVD summary episode titled Sayonara, Zetsubou-Sensei Jo: Zetsubō Shōjo Senshū (さよなら絶望先生 序〜絶望少女撰集; lit. 'Goodbye, Mr. Despair Preface: Despair Girls Collection') was released on January 1, 2008. A second DVD summary episode was released on August 27, 2008.

A 13-episode second season, titled Zoku Sayonara, Zetsubou-Sensei (【俗・】さよなら絶望先生), was broadcast from January 5 to March 29, 2008. The opening theme is "Kūsō Rumba" (空想ルンバ), performed by Kenji Ohtsuki and Zetsubō Shōjo-tachi. The opening theme for episode 7 is Lyricure Go Go! (リリキュアGOGO!), performed by Ai Nonaka, Marina Inoue and Ryōko Shintani. The series' three ending themes are "Koiji Romanesque" (恋路ロマネスク), performed by Zetsubō Shōjo-tachi, "Marionette" (マリオネット, Marionetto) by ROLLY and Zetsubō Shōjo-tachi, and "Omamori" (オマモリ), performed by Zetsubō Shōjo-tachi. A 3-episode original animation DVD (OAD), titled Goku Sayonara, Zetsubou-Sensei (獄・さよなら絶望先生), was released on October 17, December 10, 2008, and February 17, 2009.

A 13-episode third season, titled Zan: Sayonara, Zetsubou-Sensei (懺・さよなら絶望先生; literally Repent: Goodbye, Mr. Despair), was broadcast from July 4 to September 26, 2009. The opening theme is "Ringo Mogire Beam!" (林檎もぎれビーム!), performed by Kenji Ohtsuki and Zetsubō Shōjo-tachi. The first ending theme is "Zetsubō Restaurant" (絶望レストラン), performed by Zetsubō Shōjo-tachi, and the second ending theme is "Kurayami Shinchū Sōshisōai" (暗闇心中相思相愛), performed by Hiroshi Kamiya. A 2-episode OAD, titled Zan: Sayonara, Zetsubou-Sensei Bangaichi (懺・さよなら絶望先生 番外地; literally Repent: Goodbye, Mr. Despair No Man's Land), was released on November 17, 2009, and February 17, 2010. A special episode was offered to people who bought all three of Japanese Blu-ray Disc Boxes of the series and was released on January 31, 2012.

In North America, Media Blasters licensed the first Sayonara, Zetsubou-Sensei anime series in February 2010 and was going to release the first English-subtitled DVD volumes in May 2010. However, the series was put on hold until March 2013, when they dropped the rights to the series. At Anime Expo 2019, it was announced that Nozomi Entertainment licensed the series for a Blu-ray release in 2020. In May 2021, Nozomi Entertainment explained that the series' release was delayed due to lack of scripts in Japan. Besides this, the company announced that they will release the entire anime franchise, including all three television anime seasons and both OVAs.

=== Internet radio show ===
An Internet radio show titled Sayonara Zetsubō Hōsō (さよなら絶望放送, lit. Goodbye Despair Broadcast), produced by Frontier Works, organized by Hirotaka Tahara, and directed by Futoshi Satō, began airing on August 28, 2007, on Animate TV. The show is co-hosted by Hiroshi Kamiya and Ryōko Shintani who played Nozomu Itoshiki and Nami Hitō, respectively, in the anime. Each episode started with a mini drama between Nozomu and Nami, then followed by corners replying to emails from listeners on several themes related to the series. The show is often referred to as SZBH because of the in-show call sign. As of the 180th episode, the show has received over 153,000 emails.

The show features six special broadcasts. The first one was aired on November 27, 2007, titled Tokimeki Nāmin Night (ときめきナーミンナイト (TMNN)) which acts as if Ryōko Shintani is a sole host with Hiroshi Kamiya as a guest. The second and third were aired as the second and third season breakthrough commemoration on February 26, 2008, and May 27, 2008, respectively titled Sayonara Zetsubō Hōsō Senshū: Nyo (さよなら絶望放送撰集・如) and Let's Lilycure Radio (Let's リリキュラジオ! (LLLR)). The fourth special broadcast titled Toki o Kakeru Radio (時をかけるラジオ) was aired on November 24, 2008, and featured several still images of the in-show character, Sanosuke, marathoning from the Kodansha office to the recording studio. The fifth special broadcast was aired on December 31, 2008, and titled Botsu: Sayonara Zetsubō Hōsō (没・さよなら絶望放送). The sixth one was aired on April 15, 2009, titled The Kamiya Hiroshi Show (ザ・神谷浩史ショー, call sign: TKHS).

A special radio event titled Zoku Sayonara Zetsubō Hōsō: SZBH Kaizokuban (賊・さよなら絶望放送～SZBH海賊盤) was held on March 18, 2008, featuring Yū Kobayashi, who plays Kaere Kimura, with Kenji Ōtsuki and Narasaki as guests. The recording of the event was released later as the third DJCD volume. A second radio event titled Kōkai Rokuon Event: Hibiya Kōen Dai-Ongakudō: Yaon (後悔録音イベント≪日比谷公園大音楽堂〜谷怨〜≫) was held on March 24, 2009, featuring Ai Nonaka and Takahiro Mizushima, who play Kafuka Fuura and Jun Kudō, respectively. The recording of this event was released as the ninth DJCD. A total of 21 CDs for the show have been released by King Records. Ten of the CDs contain newly recorded episodes, while the fifth and sixth CDs are collections of the popular episodes.

== Reception ==
The manga has had over 5 million copies in circulation.

Sayonara, Zetsubou-Sensei won the 31st Kodansha Manga Award for the shōnen category in 2007.
