= Naoyuki Tatsuwa =

Japanese animator (born 1978)

Naoyuki Tatsuwa 龍輪 直征
- Born: March 14, 1978 (age 48); Hokkaido, Japan
- Occupations: Animator, director, storyboard artist
- Years active: 2000–present
- Employer(s): Studio Lions (2000–2003); Shaft (2004–2015)

Naoyuki Tatsuwa (Japanese: 龍輪 直征, Hepburn: Tatsuwa Naoyuki; born 1978) is a Japanese animator. He started off as an animator with Studio Lions and its parent company Studio Giants, and then spent 11 years as an animator and director at studio Shaft. Since 2015, he has been freelance.

== Career ==
Originating from Hokkaido, Tatsuwa joined the sub-contracting animation firm Studio Lions in 2000 (one part of the animation department for Studio Giants), where he mostly worked as a sub-contractor to Xebec. After working at Studio Lions, he worked as a part-time worker at construction sites and built sets for television commercials. At one point, he broke his leg while building one of the sets and couldn't walk for some time. He decided to go back to animation and was interested in joining Shaft because he wanted to work on the studio's adaptation of Pani Poni Dash!. Tatsuwa contacted the studio and asked to join, but didn't get any news, so he asked Zen Nagata, an animator he knew at the company, who put him into contact with Miho Ayabe, another animator at the studio. The same day, Mitsutoshi Kubota, the president of Shaft, called Tatsuwa and told him that he would interview him the next day. During production of Pani Poni Dash, Tatsuwa's desk was next to animator Kazuhiro Oota's and chief director Shin Oonuma's, so he got to see the finished drawings from the other animators and would flip through them, which is when he first gained interest in being a director. During production, Tatsuwa was given more responsibilities for certain things like adding material to the DVD retakes alongside animator Genichirou Abe; and when Oonuma was unable to finish storyboarding the 19th episode, he asked him to storyboard the episode's B-part (second half).

Tatsuwa's early work at the studio led to him being tasked as the "material-adding expert" for Sayonara, Zetsubou-Sensei under Akiyuki Shinbo's direction, a role which was later changed to simply "assistant director." Despite the name, Tatsuwa didn't attend the scenario meetings or overlook the storyboards prior to Shinbo checking them and was mainly given the responsibility of adding material and checking the layouts across the episodes. Tatsuwa also attended the live-recordings and post-recording sessions as well as things like the animation meetings, where he would generally do what Shinbo asked him to. The sequel series, Zoku Sayonara, Zetsubou-Sensei and its succeeding incarnations saw Yukihiro Miyamoto join the duo as chief episode director in which he would supervise aspects of all episodes and miscellaneous work like meetings and dubbing sessions when Tatsuwa couldn't attend. Tatsuwa also asked Miyamoto to look over and oversee revisions to his own work at times. Miyamoto and Tatsuwa often worked in tandem and discussed various subjects around the series like how to approach retakes, and considered both of their roles on the series to be like odd jobs.

2011 saw Tatsuwa's debut as a full-fledged series director with Shaft with the original video animation series Katte ni Kaizō under Shinbo's chief direction. Shinbo noted that he worked more as a supervisor for the series and wasn't actively involved in the direction, instead leaving most of the work to Tatsuwa's discretion. Tatsuwa directed two more series with Shaft (Nisekoi and Gourmet Girl Graffiti), and assist Shinbo two other times (And Yet the Town Moves, Sasami-san@Ganbaranai), before leaving the studio in 2015. Tatsuwa has been primarily associated with studio Passione since 2018, where he first acted as chief unit director for Citrus. He also directed Dakaichi at CloverWorks that year, but most of his directing activities have been based around Passione or Liden Films (since 2022).

=== Style ===
Although only a key animator at the time of its production, which was soon after he had joined Shaft, director Shin Oonuma commonly consulted with Tatsuwa about doing parody work on Pani Poni Dash, whom Oonuma said was good with parodies.

== Works ==
=== Television series ===
In "Director(s)" column highlights Tatsuwa's directorial works.

Year	Title	Director(s)	Studio	SB (Note: Storyboard artist.)	ED (Note: Episode director, equivalent to unit director.)	Other roles and notes	Ref(s)
2003	Stellvia	Tatsuo Satō	Xebec	No	No	In-between animation check Key animator	
2005	Tsukuyomi: Moon Phase	Akiyuki Shinbo	Shaft	No	No	Key animator	
2005	Pani Poni Dash!	Akiyuki Shinbo; Shin Oonuma (series)	Shaft	No	No	2nd key animator Key animator Eyecatch animator	
2006	Rec	Ryūtarō Nakamura	Shaft	No	No	Key animator	
2006	Negima!?	Akiyuki Shinbo; Shin Oonuma (chief)	Shaft	Yes	No	Key animator Animation director Assistant animation director	
2007	Sayonara, Zetsubou-Sensei	Akiyuki Shinbo	Shaft	Yes	No	Assistant director Key animator Extra animator Eyecatch; Extra animation storyboard artist Opening director	
2008	(Zoku) Sayonara, Zetsubou-Sensei	Akiyuki Shinbo; Yukihiro Miyamoto (chief episode)	Shaft	Yes	No	Assistant director Opening director Key animator	
2008	Hidamari Sketch x 365	Akiyuki Shinbo	Shaft	No	No	Key animator	
2009	(Zan) Sayonara, Zetsubou-Sensei	Akiyuki Shinbo; Yukihiro Miyamote (chief episode)	Shaft	Yes	Yes	Assistant director Ending director (ED 1–2)	
2009	Maria Holic	Akiyuki Shinbo; Yukihiro Miyamoto (series)	Shaft	Yes	Yes	Assistant director	
2009	Natsu no Arashi! Akinai-chū	Akiyuki Shinbo; Shin Oonuma (series, #1–7); Kenichi Ishikura (series, #8–13)	Shaft	Yes	Yes		
2010	Dance in the Vampire Bund	Akiyuki Shinbo; Masahiro Sonoda (series)	Shaft	Yes	Yes	Opening director and storyboard	
2010	Arakawa Under the Bridge	Akiyuki Shinbo; Yukihiro Miyamoto (series)	Shaft	Yes	No	Opening director Ending storyboard	
2010	And Yet the Town Moves	Akiyuki Shinbo	Shaft	Yes	Yes	Assistant director Key animator Ending director and storyboard	
2011	Puella Magi Madoka Magica	Akiyuki Shinbo; Yukihiro Miyamoto (series)	Shaft	No	No	Assistant storyboard artist	
2011	Maria Holic Alive	Akiyuki Shinbo (chief); Tomokazu Tokoro	Shaft	Yes	Yes		
2012	Nisemonogatari	Akiyuki Shinbo; Tomoyuki Itamura (series)	Shaft	No	Yes	Opening director and storyboard 2nd key animator Layout supervisor	
2012	Hidamari Sketch x Honeycomb	Akiyuki Shinbo; Yuki Yase (series)	Shaft	Yes	No		
2013	Monogatari Series Second Season	Akiyuki Shinbo (chief); Tomoyuki Itamura; Naoyuki Tatsuwa (series, #6–9); Yuki Yase (series, #14–17)	Shaft	Yes	Yes		
2013	Sasami-san@Ganbaranai	Akiyuki Shinbo	Shaft	Yes	Yes	Assistant director Opening director and storyboard Key animator	
2014	Nisekoi	Akiyuki Shinbo (chief); Naoyuki Tatsuwa	Shaft	Yes	Yes	Opening director and storyboard	
2014	Mekakucity Actors	Akiyuki Shinbo (chief); Yuki Yase	Shaft	No	No	Key animator	
2015	Gourmet Girl Graffiti	Akiyuki Shinbo (chief); Naoyuki Tatsuwa	Shaft	No	Yes		
2016	Hitori no Shita: The Outcast	Wang Xin	Pandanium	No	Yes	Chief episode director (two episodes)	
2016	Qualidea Code	Kenichi Kawamura	A-1 Pictures	No	No	Opening director and storyboard	
2017	Hinako Note	Takeo Takahashi (chief); Hijiri Sanpei (chief); Tooru Kitahata	Passione	Yes	Yes		
2017	King's Game The Animation	Tokihiro Sasaki	Seven	Yes	No		
2018	Citrus	Takeo Takahashi; Naoyuki Tatsuwa (chief episode)	Passione	No	Yes		
2018	Dakaichi	Naoyuki Tatsuwa	CloverWorks	Yes	Yes	Ending director and storyboard	
2019	Fire Force	Yuki Yase	David Production	No	No	Ending director and storyboard	
2019	Z/X Code: Reunion	Yoshifumi Sueda	Passione	No	Yes		
2020	Interspecies Reviewers	Yūki Ogawa	Passione	No	Yes		
2020	Higurashi: When They Cry – Gou	Keiichiro Kawaguchi	Passione	No	Yes	Key animator	
2021	Higurashi: When They Cry – Sotsu	Keiichiro Kawaguchi	Passione	No	Yes		
2022	Smile of the Arsnotoria the Animation	Naoyuki Tatsuwa	Liden Films	Yes	No	Ending director and storyboard	
2022	Harem in the Labyrinth of Another World	Naoyuki Tatsuwa	Passione	Yes	No	Opening director Ending storyboard	
2025	Promise of Wizard	Naoyuki Tatsuwa	Liden Films	Yes	Yes		
2026	The Classroom of a Black Cat and a Witch	Naoyuki Tatsuwa	Liden Films	TBA	TBA		
2026	Even the Student Council Has Its Holes!	Naoyuki Tatsuwa	Passione	TBA	TBA		

=== OVAs ===
Year	Title	Director(s)	Studio	SB	ED	Other roles and notes	Ref(s)
2006	Tsukuyomi: Moon Phase	Akiyuki Shinbo	Shaft	No	No	Key animator	
2006	Rec	Ryūtarō Nakamura	Shaft	No	No	Key animator	
2006	Negima!? Magister Negi Magi: Spring	Akiyuki Shinbo (chief); Shin Oonuma	Shaft	No	No	Key animator	
2008	(Goku) Sayonara Zetsubou Sensei	Akiyuki Shinbo; Yukihiro Miyamoto (chief episode)	Shaft	Yes	No	Ending storyboard Key animator	
2009	(Zan) Sayonara Zetsubou Sensei Bangaichi	Akiyuki Shinbo; Yukihiro Miyamoto (chief episode)	Shaft	Yes	Yes	Assistant director Ending director Opening storyboard	
2011	Katte ni Kaizō	Akiyuki Shinbo (chief); Naoyuki Tatsuwa	Shaft	Yes	Yes	Key animator	
2012	Sayonara, Zestsubou-Sensei Special	Akiyuki Shinbo	Shaft	No	No	Assistant director	
2014	Nisekoi	Akiyuki Shinbo (chief); Naoyuki Tatsuwa	Shaft	No	Yes	Opening director and storyboard	
2019	The Island of Giant Insects	Takeo Takahashi (chief); Naoyuki Tatsuwa	Passione	No	Yes		

=== Films ===
Year	Title	Director(s)	Studio	SB	ED	Other roles and notes	Ref(s)
2012	Puella Magi Madoka Magica the Movie: Beginnings	Akiyuki Shinbo (chief); Yukihiro Miyamoto	Shaft	Yes	No		
2016	Dōkyūsei	Shōko Nakamura	A-1 Pictures	No	No	Key animator	
2016	Your Name	Makoto Shinkai	CoMix Wave Films	No	No	Key animator	
2020	The Island of Giant Insects	Takeo Takahashi (chief); Naoyuki Tatsuwa	Passione	No	Yes		
2021	Dakaichi: Spain Arc	Naoyuki Tatsuwa	CloverWorks	No	No		
2024	Ōmuro-ke: Dear Sisters	Naoyuki Tatsuwa	Passione; Studio Lings	Yes	No	Opening director and storyboard	
2024	Ōmuro-ke: Dear Friends	Naoyuki Tatsuwa	Passione; Studio Lings	Yes	Yes	Opening director and storyboard	

== Notes ==
=== Works cited ===
- Oguro, Yuuichirou (May 2, 2011). さよなら絶望先生全書(ANIMESTYLE ARCHIVE) [Sayonara, Zetsubou-Sensei Complete ANIMESTYLE ARCHIVE] (in Japanese). Anime Style. ISBN 978-4902948080.
- Kizawa, Yukito, ed. (2013). ひだまりスケッチデイズ -TVアニメ公式ガイドブック- [Hidamari Sketch Days: TV Anime Official Guidiebook]. Houbunsha. ISBN 978-4832277403.
- Takahashi, Yumi, ed. (2019). Akiyuki Shimbo x Shaft Chronicle (in Japanese). Dotcom. ISBN 978-4835457017.
