= Bakemonogatari (manga) =

Japanese manga series

- First tankōbon volume cover, featuring Hitagi Senjōgahara

化物語
- Genre: Paranormal; Urban fantasy
- Manga
- Written by: Nisio Isin
- Illustrated by: Oh! great
- Published by: Kodansha
- English publisher: NA: Vertical
- Imprint: Shōnen Magazine Comics
- Magazine: Weekly Shōnen Magazine
- Original run: March 14, 2018 – March 15, 2023
- Volumes: 22
- icon

Bakemonogatari (Japanese: 化物語; lit. 'Monster Tale/Monstory') is a Japanese manga series illustrated by Oh! great, based on the light novel series Monogatari by Nisio Isin. It was serialized in Kodansha's shōnen manga magazine Weekly Shōnen Magazine from March 2018 to March 2023, with its chapters collected and published in 22 tankōbon volumes. The story centers around the character of Koyomi Araragi, a senior high school student who was attacked by a vampire, while he meets other characters suffering from various paranormal illnesses and comes to their aid.

By August 2020, Bakemonogatari had over 2.4 million copies in circulation.

== Plot ==
The story revolves around Koyomi Araragi, a third-year high school student, now a quasi-vampire after surviving a vampire attack, with the help of Meme Oshino, a specialist in the supernatural. Despite having some superhuman abilities, such as regeneration, Koyomi tries his best to live life as a normal student, but keeps encountering girls with supernatural problems.

As Koyomi walks up the stairs, he notices a woman falling from the top of the staircase. He catches her, but notices that the woman, Hitagi Senjougahara, has no weight to her. Naturally, Koyomi finds this unusual and realizes something is wrong. Determined to help her, he goes to Tsubasa Hanekawa to learn more about Hitagi. However, after attempting to confront her, she refuses his help and then proceeds to staple his mouth, threatening him to not mess with her. Koyomi, however, not listening to her, insists, and then runs after her to show that the wound she made in Koyomi's mouth has fully healed. Convinced with this and realizing he has been involved with oddities, she accepts Koyomi's help. He takes Hitagi to the same person who helped him, Oshino Meme. In the past, Hitagi Senjougahara's mother was involved with a cult and brought a member of the cult to their house. The cult member attempted to sexually assault Hitagi, and her mother did nothing to stop it. Hitagi then hurt the man in self-defense. As punishment, the cult took the mother away from the family. Oshino tells her that the curse is a crab, an oddity that cuts the host's weight. In Hitagi's case, she had family affairs and had intentionally removed the guilt and burden of the issues, leading to being bitten by the crab oddity that stripped her of her weight. Oshino suggests they return at midnight for the ritual. After a while, Koyomi and Hitagi head to the cram school again. They see Oshino, who has prepared the ritual, and it starts immediately. The crab becomes visible and attacks Hitagi but she realizes to get rid of it, she must bear the weight of all the guilt of her family affairs. Gaining her normal weight back, she thanks Koyomi and befriends him.

== Production ==
On January 10, 2018, Nisio Isin announced via Twitter that Bakemonogatari, from his Monogatari series, would receive a manga adaptation. On February 13, 2018, Kodansha revealed three pieces of character art and opened a contest for Twitter users to guess the identity of the artist who would illustrate the series. On February 28, 2018, it was announced that manga artist Oh! great would be illustrating the series.

In comments on the website Mantan Web, Oh! great explained his reasons for adding Kizumonogatari into the Bakemonogatari manga adaptation. He stated that for the Tsubasa Cat arc to work properly, he needed to adapt Kizumonogatari and Nekomonogatari, because in that way the readers would sympathize more for Hanekawa, and it would explain Senjougahara's position in the story thus far. He received Isin's permission to include Kizumonogatari in-between the arcs Nadeko Snake and Tsubasa Cat, but stated that he does not know if he will adapt Nekomonogatari yet, although he has an idea in mind if he does. He finished saying that his plan is to end the manga in the same way the novels ended with the high school festival.

== Publication ==
Bakemonogatari is illustrated by Oh! great, based on the light novel series Monogatari written by Nisio Isin. It was serialized in Kodansha's shōnen manga magazine Weekly Shōnen Magazine from March 14, 2018, to March 15, 2023. Kodansha collected its chapters into individual tankōbon volumes. The first volume was released on June 15, 2018. Special editions of the volumes each contain a short prose story by Nisio Isin and other bonuses, with the first volume including a short manga titled "Bake 'mono' gatari" (化"者"語) (Note: The title is spelled with the kanji character 者 (mono) meaning "person", rather than the character 物 (mono) meaning "thing", as used in the title of the Bakemonogatari (化物語) novel.) by Oh! great. The 22nd and last volume was released on May 17, 2023.

In North America, Vertical announced the English release of the manga in March 2019. The first volume was released on October 1, 2019, and the last on August 20, 2024.

A preview video for the manga adaptation, produced by Shaft, was shown to visitors of the Oh! Great Exhibition (August 14–31, 2021), and then released on February 17, 2022, alongside the 16th volume of the manga.

=== Volumes ===
No.	Original release date	Original ISBN	English release date	English ISBN
1	June 15, 2018	978-4-06-511617-3; 978-4-06-512056-9 (SE)	October 1, 2019	978-1-947194-97-7
2	August 17, 2018	978-4-06-512333-1; 978-4-06-512334-8 (SE)	January 7, 2020	978-1-949980-02-8
3	November 16, 2018	978-4-06-513313-2; 978-4-06-513314-9 (SE)	March 3, 2020	978-1-949980-16-5
4	January 17, 2019	978-4-06-513938-7; 978-4-06-513939-4 (SE)	August 25, 2020	978-1-949980-40-0
5	April 17, 2019	978-4-06-514889-1; 978-4-06-514890-7 (SE)	November 3, 2020	978-1-949980-50-9
6	July 17, 2019	978-4-06-515314-7; 978-4-06-515315-4 (SE)	December 8, 2020	978-1-949980-68-4
7	October 17, 2019	978-4-06-517166-0; 978-4-06-517163-9 (SE)	February 23, 2021	978-1-949980-69-1
8	February 17, 2020	978-4-06-518172-0; 978-4-06-518173-7 (SE)	April 27, 2021	978-1-949980-70-7
9	May 15, 2020	978-4-06-518853-8; 978-4-06-518852-1 (SE)	June 22, 2021	978-1-949980-99-8
10	August 17, 2020	978-4-06-520334-7; 978-4-06-520335-4 (SE)	September 21, 2021	978-1-64729-007-8
11	November 17, 2020	978-4-06-521256-1; 978-4-06-521257-8 (SE)	December 7, 2021	978-1-64729-064-1
12	February 17, 2021	978-4-06-522070-2; 978-4-06-522071-9 (SE)	February 22, 2022	978-1-64729-065-8
13	May 17, 2021	978-4-06-523142-5; 978-4-06-523145-6 (SE)	May 17, 2022	978-1-64729-087-0
14	August 17, 2021	978-4-06-524481-4; 978-4-06-524501-9 (SE)	June 14, 2022	978-1-64729-088-7
15	November 17, 2021	978-4-06-526005-0; 978-4-06-526004-3 (SE)	August 16, 2022	978-1-64729-089-4
16	February 17, 2022	978-4-06-526895-7; 978-4-06-526898-8 (SE)	October 25, 2022	978-1-64729-154-9
17	May 17, 2022	978-4-06-527912-0; 978-4-06-527919-9 (SE)	February 28, 2023	978-1-64729-196-9
18	August 17, 2022	978-4-06-528659-3; 978-4-06-528660-9 (SE)	May 16, 2023	978-1-64729-218-8
19	November 17, 2022	978-4-06-529635-6; 978-4-06-529634-9 (SE)	August 22, 2023	978-1-64729-219-5
20	January 17, 2023	978-4-06-530347-4; 978-4-06-530340-5 (SE)	December 5, 2023	978-1-64729-220-1
21	March 16, 2023	978-4-06-530921-6; 978-4-06-530928-5 (SE)	April 16, 2024	978-1-64729-297-3
22	May 17, 2023	978-4-06-531575-0; 978-4-06-531569-9 (SE)	August 20, 2024	978-1-64729-298-0

== Reception ==
The first three volumes of the Bakemonogatari had over one million copies in circulation by January 2019. The first nine volumes of Bakemonogatari had over 2.4 million copies in circulation by August 2020, including digital versions.
