= Renai Circulation =

- Digital release cover

Song by Nadeko Sengoku (CV: Kana Hanazawa (Note: "CV" is an abbreviation for "character voice."))

from the album Bakemonogatari Ongaku Zenshū Songs & Soundtracks
- Released: January 27, 2010
- Recorded: 2009
- Genre: J-pop; anime song
- Length: 4:16
- Label: Aniplex
- Songwriter: Satoru Kōsaki
- Lyricist: Meg Rock
- Producer: Satoru Kōsaki

Music video
- "Renai Circulation" on YouTube

"Renai Circulation" (Japanese: 恋愛サーキュレーション, Hepburn: Ren'ai Sākyurēshon; lit. "Love Circulation") is a song from the 2009 Japanese anime television series Bakemonogatari (the animated adaptation of the first book from the Monogatari series by Nisio Isin) and performed by Kana Hanazawa as her character, Nadeko Sengoku. Composed by Satoru Kōsaki with lyrics written by Meg Rock, "Renai Circulation" serves as both Nadeko's character image song as well as the opening theme song in episode 10 (Note: "Renai Circulation" also appeared as the opening theme song of episode 9 in the home release version.) of Bakemonogatari, which first premiered on September 11, 2009, to represent the "Nadeko Snake" story arc.

"Renai Circulation" was released on digital services and as a limited edition CD bonus with volume 4 of the DVD and Blu-ray home releases of Bakemonogatari on January 27, 2010. It was later given a wider physical release and compiled on the series' soundtrack album, Bakemonogatari Ongaku Zenshū Songs & Soundtracks on December 21, 2011.

"Renai Circulation" received praise for its "cute" melody and Hanazawa's vocals. After the initial release of "Renai Circulation" in 2010, the song inspired a trend of cover dances and mash-ups on Niconico. In the late 2010s, the song's popularity resurfaced globally through TikTok.

== Background and release ==
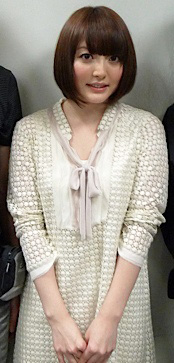
Kana Hanazawa (pictured in 2010), the voice actress of Nadeko Sengoku, performed "Renai Circulation."

"Renai Circulation" is featured in the 2009 anime series Bakemonogatari, which is the animated adaptation of the first book in the Monogatari series by Nisio Isin. It serves as the character image song for the character Nadeko Sengoku. It first appeared as the opening theme song of episode 10, "Nadeko Snake, Part 2", which was originally broadcast on September 11, 2009, on Tokyo MX, to coincide with "Nadeko Snake", a story arc featuring Nadeko as the main character. The vocals were performed by Nadeko's voice actress, Kana Hanazawa.

"Renai Circulation" was given a limited physical release as a CD bonus in vol. 4 of the DVD and Blu-ray limited edition home releases of Bakemonogatari. The home releases were originally scheduled to be on sale on December 29, 2009, but they were postponed until finally releasing on January 27, 2010. "Renai Circulation" was also released on digital services on the same day. On December 21, 2011, "Renai Circulation" saw a wider physical release on the soundtrack album Bakemonogatari Ongaku Zenshū Songs & Soundtracks.

== Composition and lyrics ==
"Renai Circulation" is composed by Satoru Kōsaki with lyrics written by Meg Rock. Kōsaki felt it would be interesting to feature Hanazawa rapping gently, inspired by Shibuya-kei music and Japanese hip-hop artist Kaseki Cider. Similar to Hanazawa's song "Melody", "Renai Circulation" is focused on a narrative with rap elements against a "funky tune." J-Cast described the song as a "light pop tune" that makes use of Hanazawa's vocals. Anime News Network described the song as a "starry-eyed love song" that reveals Nadeko's "conflict and character." Kai-You described the lyrics as depicting Nadeko's feelings for the main character of the Monogatari series, Koyomi Araragi, with Hanazawa portraying Nadeko's "maiden heart" with a "clear, whisper vocal" against a light brass section, single-note guitar, and a glockenspiel. The chorus opens with the Japanese onomatopoeia fuwa-fuwari (ふわふわり), which means "fluffy" and is used to describe "cute, upbeat, or insubstantial things." The song also contains a wordplay about Nadeko's name and yamato nadeshiko in the line "I will try without the 'shi' — I mean, I will try if it would cost my life!" (「し」抜きで いや 死ぬ気で！, "shi" nuki de, iya, shinuki de!)

Since the release of "Renai Circulation", Nadeko's subsequent character songs have referenced the former. "Mousou Express" was released for the 2013 anime series Monogatari: Second Season, which adapted Otorimonogatari and was used as the opening theme song to the "Nadeko Medusa" story arc. The song depicted Nadeko's descent into madness about her unrequited feelings for Koyomi Araragi and was seen as a response to "Renai Circulation." "Caramel Ribbon Cursetard", a duet between Nadeko and Yotsugi Ononoki (voiced by Saori Hayami) released for the 2024 anime adaptation of Nademonogatari, is also presented with rapping verses, with the lyrics having Nadeko face her past self in "Renai Circulation" and "Mousou Express."

== Reception ==
Writing for Famitsu, Shishimomofly stated that "Renai Circulation" suited Nadeko's cute image "perfectly." They also describe Hanazawa to have an "airy" and "cute" singing voice that they found "charming." Anime News Network described the song as "cutesy as all get-out" and that it framed Nadeko as "cute and dramatically vacuous", making her a cliché moe character. Kai You stated that the rapping in the song was not skilled compared to hip hop songs, but it benefited in making the song "cute" due to how it portrayed Nadeko's clumsy character. In 2019, "Renai Circulation" won the Character Song Award at the Heisei Anisong Grand Prix for the decade of 2000 to 2009.

== Live performances ==
In 2015, Hanazawa performed "Renai Circulation" as an encore song for her "Live 2015 Blue Avenue" concert tour. After "Renai Circulation" went viral on TikTok in China, Hanazawa was invited to perform the song as a special guest at the 2019 BTV Universal New Year's Eve Snow and Ice Song Festival in Beijing, China. She later performed the song again in 2019 during a concert in Shanghai. In May, Hanazawa performed the song at Monogatari Fes: 10th Anniversary Story, a talk event celebrating the 10th anniversary of the Monogatari anime adaptation.

In 2022, Hanazawa performed "Renai Circulation" on her "Live 2022 Blossom" concert tour. She also performed it at Animelo Summer Live 2022. In October, Hanazawa performed the song at the Dream Entertainment Live, an event celebrating the 55th anniversary of All Night Nippon. In 2023, she performed the song at the Tencent Music Entertainment Awards as part of a medley of her other anime songs.

== Cultural impact ==
After the song's initial release, in 2010, "Renai Circulation" became popular among anime fans, inspiring cover dances with original choreography and song mash-ups on Niconico. Nadeko won first place in a Bakemonogatari character poll held by anime merchandise retailer Toranoana, with some voters citing "Renai Circulation" as the reason. In 2018, "Renai Circulation" went viral on TikTok in China. On December 18, 2019, Chinese electronics company Xiaomi posted a parody version of the song video on Bilibili about their Q3 financial report using processed voice clips from their CEO, Lei Jun. In 2021, "Renai Circulation" spread outside of Asia on TikTok as well through a 2012 English-language cover version by American singer Lizz Robinett. Robinett's version inspired cover dances on the app and became an Internet meme. Her version of the song also saw popularity with Japanese users who were unfamiliar with the song. "Renai Circulation" was described by Natalie as an example of a J-pop song finding a global audience.In 2022, Hanazawa stated that the success of "Renai Circulation" led her to receiving more offers to perform character songs as well as a singing career. She also stated that the song has helped her "get to know [her] voice." The song "Tokyo Mauve" by Polkadot Stingray was inspired by Hanazawa, and its composition resembles "Renai Circulation." In 2022, "Renai Circulation" was used as an ending theme song to the child-rearing program Sukusuku Ko Sodate on NHK Educational TV.

=== Cover versions ===
In 2010, Japanese singer Mai Kotone recorded a cover version for Anime Dance Best Gig, a compilation album featuring covers of popular anime songs; she also performed the song during a concert celebrating her 24th birthday four years later. In 2012, American singer Lizz Robinett recorded an English-language cover, which later spread outside of Asia on TikTok. Robinett's version ranked no. 1 in the Billboard Japan TikTok Weekly Top 20 in the week of March 22, 2021. In 2013, Japanese singer Nagi Yanagi recorded a cover version as a first press bonus for her album Euaru. In 2020, a Chinese-language cover version was recorded and performed on the reality competition program Youth With You. In 2022, a cover version performed by Hotaru Shiragiku (voiced by Satomi Amano) became available as a playable song in the mobile game The Idolmaster Cinderella Girls: Starlight Stage. The Resonanz Children's Choir performed the song live with the Jakarta Concert Orchestra, during an Anime Symphony concert. In 2025, a cover version performed by Pastel Palettes became available as a playable song in the mobile game BanG Dream! Girls Band Party!.
