= List of Tenjho Tenge chapters =

The cover of the first volume of Tenjho Tenge as published by Shueisha on May 19, 1998, in Japan

This is a list of chapters of the manga series Tenjho Tenge written and illustrated by Oh! great. It was serialized in the Japanese monthly manga magazine Ultra Jump by the publisher Shueisha between 1997 and 2010. About twice a year, Shueisha compiled six or more of Tenjho Tenge's chapters into tankōbon volumes. Individual chapters are called "fights". The 136 chapters were published into 22 volumes between May 19, 1998, and November 19, 2010.

Tenjho Tenge was licensed for English language publication by CMX, which was an imprint of DC Comics. Beginning with the first on February 16, 2005, they released eighteen heavily censored volumes in North America before the company was shut down in July 2010. In November 2010, Viz Media acquired the rights to the Tenjho Tenge manga and stated that their version would be 100% uncut and faithful to the original Japanese. From June 21, 2011, to February 5, 2013, they released the series bi-monthly in eleven 2-in-1 volumes, which collects two individual volumes into a single large one. Viz's releases also includes omake, color pages from the series's original run in Ultra Jump, and since each release will cover two volumes, the second cover will be printed in as a color page.

The story primarily focuses on the members of the Juken Club and their opposition, the Executive Council, which is the ruling student body of a high school that educates its students in the art of combat. As the story unfolds, both groups become increasingly involved with an ongoing battle that has been left unresolved for four hundred years.

== Volume list ==
No.	Original release date	Original ISBN	English release date	English ISBN
1	May 19, 1998	978-4-08-875656-1	March 3, 2005	978-1-4012-0560-7
Chapters 1–6
2	December 11, 1998	978-4-08-875741-4	June 25, 2005	978-1-4012-0561-4
Chapters 7–12
3	July 19, 1999	978-4-08-875808-4	September 30, 2005	978-1-4012-0562-1
Chapters 13–19
4	February 18, 2000	978-4-08-875886-2	November 30, 2005	978-1-4012-0563-8
Chapters 20–26
5	November 17, 2000	978-4-08-876097-1	December 5, 2005	978-1-4012-0564-5
Chapters 27–33
6	June 19, 2001	978-4-08-876174-9	February 7, 2006	978-1-4012-0851-6
Chapters 34–39
7	December 10, 2001	978-4-08-876253-1	May 3, 2006	978-1-4012-0852-3
Chapters 40–45
8	July 19, 2002	978-4-08-876326-2	June 30, 2006	978-1-4012-0853-0
Chapters 46–51
9	December 11, 2002	978-4-08-876387-3	August 30, 2006	978-1-4012-0854-7
Chapters 52–57
10	October 17, 2003	978-4-08-876519-8	October 18, 2006	978-1-4012-0855-4
Chapters 58–63
11	April 19, 2004	978-4-08-876601-0	December 20, 2006	978-1-4012-0856-1
Chapters 64–69
12	August 19, 2004	978-4-08-876668-3	February 14, 2007	978-1-4012-1019-9
Chapters 70–75
13	April 19, 2005	978-4-08-876792-5	April 6, 2007	978-1-4012-1285-8
Chapters 76–81
14	November 18, 2005	978-4-08-876875-5	June 1, 2007	978-1-4012-1303-9
Chapters 82–87
15	June 19, 2006	978-4-08-877104-5	August 17, 2007	978-1-4012-1304-6
Chapters 88–93
16	January 19, 2007	978-4-08-877209-7	November 14, 2007	978-1-4012-1399-2
Chapters 94–99
17	July 19, 2007	978-4-08-877305-6	August 5, 2008	978-1-4012-1532-3
Chapters 100–105
18	February 19, 2008	978-4-08-877407-7	September 8, 2009	978-1-4012-1532-3
Chapters 106–111
19	September 19, 2008	978-4-08-877516-6	December 18, 2012	978-1-42-154017-7
Chapters 112–117
20	May 19, 2009	978-4-08-877655-2	December 18, 2012	978-1-42-154017-7
Chapters 118–123
21	January 19, 2010	978-4-08-877797-9	February 5, 2013	978-1-42-154948-4
Chapters 124–129
22	November 19, 2010	978-4-08-879068-8	February 5, 2013	978-1-42-154948-4
Chapters 130–136
