= Weekly Shōnen Magazine =

Japanese manga magazine

- Cover of first issue, featuring sumo wrestler Asashio Tarō III
- Editor-in-Chief: Shintaro Kawakubo
- Categories: Shōnen manga
- Frequency: Weekly
- Circulation: 285,615; (July–September 2026)
- Publisher: Kodansha
- First issue: March 17, 1959; 67 years ago
- Country: Japan
- Based in: Tokyo
- Language: Japanese
- Website: Official website

Weekly Shōnen Magazine (Japanese: 週刊少年マガジン, Hepburn: Shūkan Shōnen Magajin) is a weekly shōnen manga magazine published on Wednesdays in Japan by Kodansha, first published on March 17, 1959. The magazine is mainly read by an older audience, with a significant portion of its readership falling under the male high school or college student demographic. According to circulation figures accumulated by the Japanese Magazine Publishers Association, the magazine's circulation has dropped in every quarter since records were first collected in April–June 2008. This is, however, not an isolated occurrence as digital media continues to be on the rise.

It is one of the best-selling manga magazines. By March 2008, the magazine had 2,942 issues, having sold 4.55 billion copies, with an average weekly circulation of 1,546,567. At an average issue price of ¥129 ($1.29), the magazine had generated approximately ¥590 billion ($5.9 billion) in sales revenue by March 2008. In addition, about 1 billion compiled tankōbon volumes had been sold by March 2008.

Jason Thompson stated that it is "more down-to-earth, as well as just a tad more guy-oriented" compared to Weekly Shōnen Jump and likened this magazine to "more like something you'd find in the guys' locker room."

== History ==
The magazine, launched on March 17, 1959, was the first weekly manga magazine, followed rapidly by Weekly Shōnen Sunday by rivalling publisher Shogakukan. Throughout the 1960s, Weekly Shōnen Magazine was the top selling weekly manga magazines besides Weekly Shōnen Sunday and Weekly Shōnen King. During the first years of its run, the magazine was not solely focused on manga, but also published other content for children.

From 1965 onwards, the chief editor of Weekly Shōnen Magazine, Masaru Uchida, invited artists associated with the gekiga movement to work for the magazine. The gekiga movement had a style marked by dramatic, realistic storytelling often aimed at mature audiences. Blending children's manga with adolescent gekiga themes and styles attracted new readers to manga magazines. In a short time, the readership of the magazine expanded rapidly and was at nearly one million by the end of 1966.

== Features ==
=== Series ===
There are currently 31 manga titles being serialized in Weekly Shōnen Magazine. Out of them, Ahiru no Sora is on indefinite hiatus.

| Series title | Author(s) | Premiered |
|---|---|---|
| Ahiru no Sora (あひるの空) | Takeshi Hinata | December 2003 |
| Blue Lock (ブルーロック, Burū Rokku) | Muneyuki Kaneshiro, Yusuke Nomura | August 2018 |
| The Blue Wolves of Mibu (青のミブロ, Ao no Miburo) | Tsuyoshi Yasuda | October 2021 |
| A Couple of Cuckoos (カッコウの許嫁, Kakkō no Iinazuke) | Miki Yoshikawa | January 2020 |
| Even the Student Council Has Its Holes! (生徒会にも穴はある!, Seitokai ni mo Ana wa Aru!) | Muchimaro | April 2022 |
| Four Knights of the Apocalypse (黙示録の四騎士, Mokushiroku no Yonkishi) | Nakaba Suzuki | January 2021 |
| Gachiakuta (ガチアクタ) | Kei Urana | February 2022 |
| Go! Go! Loser Ranger! (戦隊大失格, Sentai Daishikkaku) | Negi Haruba | February 2021 |
| Gunyū o Tsuzuru (群雄を綴る) | Otemoto | July 2026 |
| Hajime no Ippo (はじめの一歩) | George Morikawa | October 1989 |
| Jackpot Girls (ドリーム☆ジャンボ☆ガール, Dorīmu Janbo Gāru) | Hiroyuki | May 2025 |
| Kaijin Fugeki (灰仭巫覡) | Oh! great | May 2024 |
| Killer + Sitter | Akimine Kamijyo | June 2026 |
| Kurotsuki no Yaergnacht (黒月のイェルクナハト, Kurotsuki no Ierukunahato) | Kou Suzumoto | April 2025 |
| Lilim Holic (りりむホリック, Ririmu Horikku) | Tsumugi Musawo | May 2026 |
| Mistress Kanan Is Devilishly Easy (カナン様はあくまでチョロい, Kanan-sama wa Akumade Choroi) | Nonco | June 2022 |
| Medaka Kuroiwa Is Impervious to My Charms (黒岩メダカに私の可愛いが通じない, Kuroiwa Medaka ni Watashi no Kawaii ga Tsūjinai) | Ran Kuze | May 2021 |
| Onryō Biyori (怨霊日和) | Haruka Imai | September 2026 |
| Orion's Board (盤上のオリオン, Banjō no Orion) | Naoshi Arakawa | January 2024 |
| Rent-A-Girlfriend (彼女、お借りします, Kanojo, Okarishimasu) | Reiji Miyajima | July 2017 |
| Sen Sen Senki (千仙戦記) | A-10, Ryūga Kawasaki | June 2026 |
| Shangri-La Frontier (シャングリラ・フロンティア〜クソゲーハンター、神ゲーに挑まんとす〜, Shangurira Furontia ~ Kusogē Hantā, Kamigē ni Idoman to su ~) | Katarina, Ryosuke Fuji | July 2020 |
| Suruga Meteor (スルガメテオ, Suruga Meteo) | Tanaka Drill | January 2025 |
| Tune In to the Midnight Heart (真夜中ハートチューン, Mayonaka Heart Tune) | Masakuni Igarashi | September 2023 |
| Umine the Island Inn (あの島の海音荘, Anoshima no Kainesō) | Kōji Seo | January 2026 |
| Ura-Tokyo: Exorcist City (裏東京のオソロシドコロ, Ura Tōkyō no Osoroshidokoro) | Kojiro | March 2026 |
| Witch on the Holy Night (魔法使いの夜, Mahōtsukai no Yoru) | Keigo Maki | November 2026 |
| Yowayowa Sensei (よわよわ先生) | Kamio Fukuchi | November 2022 |
| Yumene Connect (ゆめねこねくと, Yumene Konekuto) | Kou Sawada | September 2024 |
| Zero to Hyaku (ゼロとヒャク) | Shōichirō Edo | November 2025 |
| Zureta Kaishaku no Bokura (ズレた解釈のぼくら) | Kano Kashiwagi | July 2026 |

== Circulation ==
Circulation
| Date(s) | January–March | April–June | July–September | October–December | Magazine sales | Ref |
|---|---|---|---|---|---|---|
| March 1959 to March 2008 | 1,546,567 | | | | 4,550,000,000 | |
| April 2008 to December 2008 | — | 1,755,000 | 1,720,000 | 1,691,667 | 67,166,671 | |
| 2009 | 1,664,167 | 1,633,334 | 1,614,616 | 1,593,637 | 84,574,802 | |
| 2010 | 1,571,231 | 1,565,000 | 1,556,250 | 1,551,819 | 81,175,900 | |
| 2011 | 1,529,693 | 1,491,500 | 1,489,584 | 1,472,084 | 77,777,193 | |
| 2012 | 1,447,500 | 1,436,017 | 1,412,584 | 1,404,834 | 74,112,155 | |
| 2013 | 1,376,792 | 1,357,000 | 1,324,209 | 1,308,117 | 69,759,534 | |
| 2014 | 1,277,500 | 1,245,417 | 1,211,750 | 1,192,267 | 64,050,142 | |
| 2015 | 1,156,059 | 1,127,042 | 1,107,840 | 1,085,110 | 58,188,663 | |
| 2016 | 1,038,450 | 1,015,659 | 995,017 | 986,017 | 52,456,859 | |
| 2017 | 964,158 | 932,713 | 883,804 | 840,667 | 47,077,446 | |
| January 2018 to March 2018 | 815,458 | — | — | — | 10,600,954 | |
| March 1959 to March 2018 | 1,512,692 | | | | 5,236,940,319 | |

== Magazine Pocket ==
Magazine Pocket (マガジンポケット, Magajin Poketto), or MagaPoke (マガポケ), is an online web comic site run by Kodansha and tied in to their Weekly Shōnen Magazine line. It runs original manga created for the site as well as manga moved from one of the print magazines related to Weekly Shōnen Magazine. It opened on August 3, 2015.

== Reception ==
The Weekly Shōnen Magazine achieved success in the 1970s and subsequently had increased sales. As a result, it became the top-selling manga magazine in Japan of its period, appearing popular amongst many otaku. But the position was later occupied by Weekly Shōnen Jump, when this competitor was born in 1968, knocking Shōnen Magazine off the top spot. Shōnen Jump had begun to circulate and dominate the manga magazine market. This started from the 1970s and continued throughout the 1990s.

In October 1997, Shōnen Magazine reclaimed its position as the top-selling manga magazine of its day until this was brokered in 2002. Currently, the two magazines have competed closely in terms of market circulation. Sales of the two magazines now remain very close. Circulation has dropped below two million. In a rare event due to the closeness of the two magazine's founding dates, Weekly Shōnen Magazine and Weekly Shōnen Sunday released a special combined issue on March 19, 2008. In addition, other commemorative events, merchandise, and manga crossovers were planned for the following year as part of the celebrations.

Others include Shōnen Magazine, published by Kobunsha of the same Kodansha group. Shōnen Magazine famously serialized Tetsujin 28-go, the first mecha anime from July 1956 to May 1966.

== See also ==
- List of manga magazines
- Shonen Magz, Indonesian version
- Sunday vs Magazine: Shūketsu! Chōjō Daikessen (video game)
