= Kaijin Fugeki =

Japanese manga series

- Kaijin Fugeki: Kindled Spirits
- First tankōbon volume cover

灰仭巫覡 (Kaijin Fugeki)
- Genre: Adventure; Science fiction
- Manga
- Written by: Oh! great
- Published by: Kodansha
- English publisher: NA: Kodansha USA
- Imprint: Shōnen Magazine Comics
- Magazine: Weekly Shōnen Magazine
- Original run: May 29, 2024 – present
- Volumes: 10
- icon

Kaijin Fugeki: Kindled Spirits (Japanese: 灰仭巫覡, Hepburn: Kaijin Fugeki) is a Japanese manga series written and illustrated by Oh! great. It began serialization in Kodansha's Weekly Shōnen Magazine in May 2024, and has been compiled into ten volumes as of November 2026.

== Plot ==
The series follows Jin, a young Japanese boy who lives in a world affected by mysterious phenomena known as the Night. One day, he meets Gao, a soldier who escaped from Britain to Japan ten months earlier after a Night manifested itself. Gao's ship crash landed, which resulted in the death of Jin's mother. The two live together in a rural town along with other residents while dealing with the effects of the Night.

== Characters ==
Jin (仭)
A young boy living in the countryside. His mother was killed when Gao's ship crash landed in Japan.
Gao (ガオ)
A brigadier general in the British army. Ten months prior to the events of the series, a Night known as Catherine, the Night of Cyclones, appeared, killing his mother. Her dying wish was for him to go to Japan, leading to him heading there, only for his ship to crash.
Micaiah (ミカイェ)
A major in the British army and Gao's subordinate. The two became close after Gao's mother was killed.
Natsu Misasagi (御陵 ナツ, Misasagi Natsu)
Fuyu Misasagi (御陵 フユ, Misasagi Fuyu)
A pair of conjoined twins who work as shrine maidens.

== Publication ==
Written and illustrated by Oh! great, Kaijin Fugeki started in Kodansha's Weekly Shōnen Magazine on May 29, 2024. The first tankōbon volume was released on August 16, 2025. Ten volumes have been published as of November 17, 2026. The series is licensed in English by Kodansha USA, and it is simulpublished on the K Manga service.

No.	Original release date	Original ISBN	English release date	English ISBN
1	August 16, 2024	978-4-06-536535-9	January 13, 2026	978-1-64729-504-2
2	November 15, 2024	978-4-06-537050-6	March 10, 2026	978-1-64729-565-3
3	February 17, 2025	978-4-06-538422-0	May 26, 2026	978-1-64729-591-2
4	May 16, 2025	978-4-06-539353-6	July 28, 2026	978-1-64729-592-9
5	August 12, 2025	978-4-06-540377-8	September 15, 2026	978-1-64729-641-4
6	November 17, 2025	978-4-06-541551-1	November 17, 2026	978-1-64729-642-1
7	February 17, 2026	978-4-06-542625-8	January 19, 2027	978-1-64729-643-8
8	May 15, 2026	978-4-06-543630-1	March 9, 2027	978-1-64729-688-9
9	August 17, 2026	978-4-06-544627-0	—	—
10	November 17, 2026	978-4-06-545710-8	—	—

== Reception ==
In October 2024, a Kodansha representative stated that the series was its best-selling new series of the past year. In May 2025, it was reported that the series had sold over 200,000 copies. The series was nominated in the Daruma for Best Drawing and Action Manga categories at the Japan Expo Awards in 2026.
