= List of Monogatari novels =

Cover of the first light novel volume of Bakemonogatari, featuring Hitagi Senjougahara, published by Kodansha on November 2, 2006

Monogatari is a Japanese light novel series written by Nisio Isin and illustrated by Vofan. The plot centers around Koyomi Araragi, a third-year high school student who survives a vampire attack and subsequently finds himself helping girls involved with a variety of apparitions, ghosts, beasts, spirits, and other supernatural phenomena.

The series began as three short stories serialized in Kodansha's Mephisto magazine between the September 2005 and May 2006 issues, which were later collected in a light novel volume published in Japan on November 2, 2006. Kodansha released 29 volumes in the series under its Kodansha Box imprint. Each of the 29 entries in the series share the common title suffix -monogatari (物語; lit. "story"). In 2015, Vertical licensed the novel series for English release. The company began its paperback line with Kizumonogatari on December 15, 2015, and later released the Bakemonogatari novels in three volumes: the first in December 2016, the second in February 2017, and the third in April 2017. As of December 2020, the novels in the series up to Zoku Owarimonogatari have been translated.

Nisio Isin has also penned a number of short short stories (Note: Short story in Japanese is Tanpen (短編), and Nisio uses the word Tantanpen (短々編), emphasizing the kanji for Short (短), to refer to the short stories he's been writing for the Monogatari series.) and other related works set in the same fictional universe.

== Volume lists ==
=== Japanese volume list ===
==== First Season ====
No.	Title	Release date	ISBN
1	Bakemonogatari (Vol. 1) (化物語(バケモノガタリ)（上） Bakemonogatari (Jō))	November 1, 2006	978-4-06-283602-9
"Episode One: Hitagi Crab" (第一話 ひたぎクラブ, Dai Ichi Wa Hitagi Kurabu); "Episode Two: Mayoi Maimai" (第二話 まよいマイマイ, Dai Ni Wa Mayoi Maimai); "Episode Three: Suruga Monkey" (第三話 するがモンキー, Dai San Wa Suruga Monkī)
2	Bakemonogatari (Vol. 2) (化物語(バケモノガタリ)（下） Bakemonogatari (Ge))	December 5, 2006	978-4-06-283607-4
"Episode Four: Nadeko Snake" (第四話 なでこスネイク, Dai Yon Wa Nadeko Suneiku); "Episode Five: Tsubasa Cat" (第五話 つばさキャット, Dai Go Wa Tsubasa Kyatto)
3	Kizumonogatari (傷物語(キズモノガタリ))	May 8, 2008; December 23, 2015 (SE)	978-4-06-283663-0; 978-4-06-219948-3 (SE)
"Episode Zero: Koyomi Vamp" (第零話 こよみヴァンプ, Dai Zero Wa Koyomi Vanpu)
4	Nisemonogatari (Vol. 1) (偽物語(ニセモノガタリ)（上） Nisemonogatari (Jō))	September 2, 2008	978-4-06-283679-1
"Episode Six: Karen Bee" (第六話 かれんビー, Dai Roku Wa Karen Bī)
5	Nisemonogatari (Vol. 2) (偽物語(ニセモノガタリ)（下） Nisemonogatari (Ge))	June 11, 2009	978-4-06-283702-6
"Final Episode: Tsukihi Phoenix" (最終話 つきひフェニックス, Saishū Wa Tsukihi Fenikkusu)
6	Nekomonogatari (Black) (猫物語(ネコモノガタリ)（黒） Nekomonogatari (Kuro))	July 29, 2010	978-4-06-283748-4
"Episode Nixed: Tsubasa Family" (第禁話 つばさファミリー, Dai Kin Wa Tsubasa Famirī)

==== Second Season ====
No.	Title	Release date	ISBN
7	Nekomonogatari (White) (猫物語(ネコモノガタリ)（白） Nekomonogatari (Shiro))	October 28, 2010	978-4-06-283758-3
"Episode Snug: Tsubasa Tiger" (第懇話 つばさタイガー, Dai Kon Wa Tsubasa Taigā)
8	Kabukimonogatari (傾物語(カブキモノガタリ))	December 25, 2010	978-4-06-283767-5
"Episode Idle: Mayoi Jiangshi" (第閑話 まよいキョンシー, Dai Kan Wa Mayoi Kyonshī)
9	Hanamonogatari (花物語(ハナモノガタリ))	March 30, 2011	978-4-06-283771-2
"Episode Change: Suruga Devil" (第変話 するがデビル, Dai Hen Wa Suruga Debiru)
10	Otorimonogatari (囮物語(オトリモノガタリ))	June 29, 2011	978-4-06-283776-7
"Episode Chaos: Nadeko Medusa" (第乱話 なでこメドゥーサ, Dai Ran Wa Nadeko Medūsa)
11	Onimonogatari (鬼物語(オニモノガタリ))	September 29, 2011	978-4-06-283781-1
"Episode Endure: Shinobu Time" (第忍話 しのぶタイム, Dai Nin Wa Shinobu Taimu)
12	Koimonogatari (恋物語(コイモノガタリ))	December 21, 2011	978-4-06-283792-7
"Episode Love: Hitagi End" (第恋話 ひたぎエンド, Dai Ren Wa Hitagi Endo)

==== Final Season ====
No.	Title	Release date	ISBN
13	Tsukimonogatari (憑物語(ツキモノガタリ))	September 27, 2012	978-4-06-283812-2
"Episode Body: Yotsugi Doll" (第体話 よつぎドール, Dai Tai Wa Yotsugi Dōru)
14	Koyomimonogatari (暦物語(コヨミモノガタリ))	May 21, 2013	978-4-06-283837-5
"Episode One: Koyomi Stone" (第一話 こよみストーン, Dai Ichi Wa Koyomi Sutōn); "Episode Two: Koyomi Flower" (第二話 こよみフラワー, Dai Ni Wa Koyomi Furawā); "Episode Three: Koyomi Sand" (第三話 こよみサンド, Dai San Wa Koyomi Sando); "Episode Four: Koyomi Water" (第四話 こよみウォーター, Dai Yon Wa Koyomi Wōtā); "Episode Five: Koyomi Wind" (第五話 こよみウインド, Dai Go Wa Koyomi Uindo); "Episode Six: Koyomi Tree" (第六話 こよみツリー, Dai Roku Wa Koyomi Tsurī); "Episode Seven: Koyomi Tea" (第七話 こよみティー, Dai Nana Wa Koyomi Tī); "Episode Eight: Koyomi Mountain" (第八話 こよみマウンテン, Dai Hachi Wa Koyomi Maunten); "Episode Nine: Koyomi Torus" (第九話 こよみトーラス, Dai Kyū Wa Koyomi Tōrasu); "Episode Ten: Koyomi Seed" (第十話 こよみシード, Dai Jū Wa Koyomi Shīdo); "Episode Eleven: Koyomi Nothing" (第十一話 こよみナッシング, Dai Jū Ichi Wa Koyomi Nasshingu); "Episode Twelve: Koyomi Dead" (第十二話 こよみデッド, Dai Jū Ni Wa Koyomi Deddo)
15	Owarimonogatari (Vol. 1) (終物語(オワリモノガタリ)（上） Owarimonogatari (Jō))	October 22, 2013	978-4-06-283857-3
"Episode One: Ōgi Formula" (第一話 おうぎフォーミュラ, Dai Ichi Wa Ōgi Fōmyura); "Episode Two: Sodachi Riddle" (第二話 そだちリドル, Dai Ni Wa Sodachi Ridoru); "Episode Three: Sodachi Lost" (第三話 そだちロスト, Dai San Wa Sodachi Rosuto)
16	Owarimonogatari (Vol. 2) (終物語(オワリモノガタリ)（中） Owarimonogatari (Chū))	January 30, 2014	978-4-06-283861-0
"Episode Four: Shinobu Mail" (第四話 しのぶメイル, Dai Yon Wa Shinobu Meiru)
17	Owarimonogatari (Vol. 3) (終物語(オワリモノガタリ)（下） Owarimonogatari (Ge))	April 2, 2014	978-4-06-283868-9
"Episode Five: Mayoi Hell" (第五話 まよいヘル, Dai Go Wa Mayoi Heru); "Episode Six: Hitagi Rendezvous" (第六話 ひたぎランデブー, Dai Roku Wa Hitagi Randebū); "Episode Seven: Ōgi Dark" (第七話 おうぎダーク, Dai Nana Wa Ōgi Dāku)
18	Zoku Owarimonogatari (続(ゾク)・終物語(オワリモノガタリ))	September 18, 2014	978-4-06-283878-8
"Final Episode: Koyomi Reverse" (最終話 こよみリバース, Saishū Wa Koyomi Ribāsu)

==== Off Season ====
No.	Title	Release date	ISBN
19	Orokamonogatari (愚物語(オロカモノガタリ))	October 6, 2015	978-4-06-283889-4
"Episode Zero: (Note: In the afterword of Wazamonogatari and Nademonogatari Nisio speaks of these chapters as "zeroth episodes", so it is assumed the printing of the stories in this volume as "Episodes One, Two, and Three" were due to technical issues.) Sodachi Fiasco" (第零話 そだちフィアスコ, Dai Zero Wa Sodachi Fiasuko); "Episode Zero: Suruga Bonehead" (第零話 するがボーンヘッド, Dai Zero Wa Suruga Bōnheddo); "Episode Zero: Tsukihi Undo" (第零話 つきひアンドゥ, Dai Zero Wa Tsukihi Andu)
20	Wazamonogatari (業物語(ワザモノガタリ))	January 14, 2016	978-4-06-283892-4
"A Cruel Fairy Tale: The Beautiful Princess" (残酷童話 うつくし姫, Zankoku Dōwa Utsukushihime); "Episode Zero: Acerola Bon Appétit" (第零話 あせろらボナペティ, Dai Zero Wa Aserora Bonapeti); "Episode Zero: Karen Ogre" (第零話 かれんオウガ, Dai Zero Wa Karen Ouga); "Episode Zero: Tsubasa Sleeping" (第零話 つばさスリーピング, Dai Zero Wa Tsubasa Surīpingu)
21	Nademonogatari (撫物語(ナデモノガタリ))	July 28, 2016	978-4-06-283898-6
"Episode Zero: Nadeko Draw" (第零話 なでこドロー, Dai Zero Wa Nadeko Dorō)
22	Musubimonogatari (結物語(ムスビモノガタリ))	January 12, 2017	978-4-06-283900-6
"Episode One: Zenka Mermaid" (第一話 ぜんかマーメイド, Dai Ichi Wa Zenka Māmeido); "Episode Two: Nozomi Golem" (第二話 のぞみゴーレム, Dai Ni Wa Nozomi Gōremu); "Episode Three: Mitome Wolf" (第三話 みとめウルフ, Dai San Wa Mitome Urufu); "Episode Four: Tsuzura Human" (第四話 つづらヒューマン, Dai Yon Wa Tsuzura Hyūman)

==== Monster Season ====
No.	Title	Release date	ISBN
23	Shinobumonogatari (忍物語(シノブモノガタリ))	July 20, 2017	978-4-06-283902-0
"Episode One: Shinobu Mustard" (第一話 しのぶマスタード, Dai Ichi Wa Shinobu Masutādo)
24	Yoimonogatari (宵物語(ヨイモノガタリ))	June 14, 2018	978-4-06-511992-1
"Episode Two: Mayoi Snail" (第二話 まよいスネイル, Dai Ni Wa Mayoi Suneiru); "Episode Three: Mayoi Snake" (第三話 まよいスネイク, Dai San Wa Mayoi Suneiku)
25	Amarimonogatari (余物語(アマリモノガタリ))	April 17, 2019	978-4-06-515225-6
"Episode Four: Yotsugi Buddy" (第四話 よつぎバディ, Dai Yon Wa Yotsugi Badi); "Episode Five: Yotsugi Shadow" (第五話 よつぎシャドウ, Dai Go Wa Yotsugi Shadou)
26	Ōgimonogatari (扇物語(オウギモノガタリ))	October 28, 2020	978-4-06-521158-8
"Episode Six: Ōgi Right" (第六話 おうぎライト, Dai Roku Wa Ōgi Raito); "Episode Seven: Ōgi Flight" (第七話 おうぎフライト, Dai Nana Wa Ōgi Furaito)
27	Shinomonogatari (Vol. 1) (死物語(シノモノガタリ)（上） Shinomonogatari (Jō))	August 19, 2021	978-4-06-524454-8
"Episode Eight: Shinobu Suicide" (第八話 しのぶスーサイド, Dai Hachi Wa Shinobu Sūsaido)
28	Shinomonogatari (Vol. 2) (死物語(シノモノガタリ)（下） Shinomonogatari (Ge))	August 19, 2021	978-4-06-524455-5
"Final Episode: Nadeko Araundo" (最終話 なでこアラウンド, Saishū Wa Nadeko Araundo)

==== Family Season ====
No.	Title	Release date	ISBN
29	Ikusamonogatari (戦物語(イクサモノガタリ))	May 17, 2023	978-4-06-531262-9
"Episode Wedding: Hitagi Honeymoon" (第婚話 ひたぎハネムーン, Dai Kon Wa Hitagi Hanemūn)
30	Tsugimonogatari (接物語(ツギモノガタリ))	October 16, 2025	978-4-06-541079-0
"Episode Ninety-Nine: Yotsugi Frank" (第九十九話 よつぎフランク, Dai Tsukumo Wa Yotsugi Furanku)
31	Torimonogatari (鳥物語(トリモノガタリ))	September 4, 2026	978-4-06-543739-1
"Gathering Episode: Yotsugi Rebake" (採集話 よつぎリベイク, Saishū Wa Yotsugi Ribeiku)
32	Ootorimonogatari (鳳物語(オオトリモノガタリ))	—	—

=== English volume list ===
==== First Season ====
No.	Title	Release date	ISBN
1	Kizumonogatari: Wound Tale	December 15, 2015	978-1-941220-97-9
"Chapter Zero: Koyomi Vamp"
2	Bakemonogatari, Part 1: Monster Tale	December 20, 2016	978-1-942993-88-9
"Chapter One: Hitagi Crab"; "Chapter Two: Mayoi Snail"
3	Bakemonogatari, Part 2: Monster Tale	February 28, 2017	978-1-942993-89-6
"Chapter Three: Suruga Monkey"; "Chapter Four: Nadeko Snake"
4	Bakemonogatari, Part 3: Monster Tale	April 25, 2017	978-1-942993-90-2
"Chapter Five: Tsubasa Cat"
5	Nisemonogatari, Part 1: Fake Tale	June 27, 2017	978-1-942993-98-8
"Chapter Six: Karen Bee"
6	Nisemonogatari, Part 2: Fake Tale	August 29, 2017	978-1-942993-99-5
"Final Chapter: Tsukihi Phoenix"
7	Nekomonogatari (Black): Cat Tale	December 8, 2017	978-1-945054-48-8
"Chapter Nixed: Tsubasa Family"

==== Second Season ====
No.	Title	Release date	ISBN
8	Nekomonogatari (White): Cat Tale	February 27, 2018	978-1-945054-49-5
"Chapter Snug: Tsubasa Tiger"
9	Kabukimonogatari: Dandy Tale	May 17, 2018	978-1-945054-84-6
"Chapter Idle: Mayoi Jiangshi"
10	Hanamonogatari: Flower Tale	June 20, 2018	978-1-947194-06-9
"Chapter Change: Suruga Devil"
11	Otorimonogatari: Decoy Tale	August 28, 2018	978-1-947194-14-4
"Chapter Chaos: Nadeko Medusa"
12	Onimonogatari: Demon Tale	October 30, 2018	978-1-947194-31-1
"Chapter Endure: Shinobu Time"
13	Koimonogatari: Love Tale	January 29, 2019	978-1-947194-33-5
"Chapter Love: Hitagi End"

==== Final Season ====
No.	Title	Release date	ISBN
14	Tsukimonogatari: Possession Tale	April 30, 2019	978-1-947194-47-2
"Chapter Body: Yotsugi Doll"
15	Koyomimonogatari, Part 1: Calendar Tale	June 17, 2019	978-1-947194-48-9
"Chapter One: Koyomi Stone"; "Chapter Two: Koyomi Flower"; "Chapter Three: Koyomi Sand"; "Chapter Four: Koyomi Water"; "Chapter Five: Koyomi Wind"; "Chapter Six: Koyomi Tree"
16	Koyomimonogatari, Part 2: Calendar Tale	August 27, 2019	978-1-947194-69-4
"Chapter Seven: Koyomi Tea"; "Chapter Eight: Koyomi Mountain"; "Chapter Nine: Koyomi Torus"; "Chapter Ten: Koyomi Seed"; "Chapter Eleven: Koyomi Nothing"; "Chapter Twelve: Koyomi Dead"
17	Owarimonogatari, Part 1: End Tale	December 16, 2019	978-1-947194-90-8
"Chapter One: Ogi Formula"; "Chapter Two: Sodachi Riddle"; "Chapter Three: Sodachi Lost"
18	Owarimonogatari, Part 2: End Tale	March 31, 2020	978-1-947194-92-2
"Chapter Four: Shinobu Mail"
19	Owarimonogatari, Part 3: End Tale	October 27, 2020	978-1-949980-22-6
"Chapter Five: Mayoi Hell"; "Chapter Six: Hitagi Rendezvous"; "Chapter Seven: Ogi Dark"
20	Zoku Owarimonogatari: End Tale (Cont.)	December 15, 2020	978-1-949980-44-8
"Chapter Final: Koyomi Reverse"

==== Box sets ====
In addition to being sold as individual volumes, the English novels have been combined into box sets with additional original artwork by VOFAN.

No.	Title	Release date	ISBN
Box 1	Monogatari Series Box Set Season 1	November 20, 2018	978-1-947194-39-7
Kizumonogatari: Wound Tale; Bakemonogatari, Part 1: Monster Tale; Bakemonogatari, Part 2: Monster Tale; Bakemonogatari, Part 3: Monster Tale; Nisemonogatari, Part 1: Fake Tale; Nisemonogatari, Part 2: Fake Tale; Nekomonogatari (Black): Cat Tale
Box 2	Monogatari Series Box Set Season 2	December 17, 2019	978-1-949980-06-6
Nekomonogatari (White): Cat Tale; Kabukimonogatari: Dandy Tale; Hanamonogatari: Flower Tale; Otorimonogatari: Decoy Tale; Onimonogatari: Demon Tale; Koimonogatari: Love Tale
Box 3	Monogatari Series Box Set Final Season	July 13, 2021	978-1-949980-86-8
Tsukimonogatari: Possession Tale; Koyomimonogatari, Part 1: Calendar Tale; Koyomimonogatari, Part 2: Calendar Tale; Owarimonogatari, Part 1: End Tale; Owarimonogatari, Part 2: End Tale; Owarimonogatari, Part 3: End Tale; Zoku Owarimonogatari: End Tale (Cont.)

=== Audiobook ===
The English audiobook version of Kizumonogatari was released on May 25, 2016, by Bang Zoom! Entertainment with narration done by Keith Silverstein, Eric Kimerer, and Cristina Vee. The audiobook for Nekomonogatari (White) was released on April 9, 2019, with narration done by Cristina Vee, Eric Kimerer, and Erica Mendez. The audiobook for the three volumes of Bakemonogatari were released on March 24, 2020, with narration done by Eric Kimerer, Cristina Vee, Erica Mendez, and Keith Silverstein.

The Japanese audiobook version of the entire series began release by Kodansha via Audible on February 17, 2021. Each novel features narration by the voice actors/actresses of the anime adaptation. It released one novel each month until June 16, 2023, with the second volume of Shinomonogatari.

Novel	Narrator	Release
Bakemonogatari (1)	Hiroshi Kamiya	February 17, 2021
Bakemonogatari (2)	Emiri Katō	March 19, 2021
Bakemonogatari (3) (Note: The Japanese e-book version of Bakemonogatari split the two volumes of the novels into three volumes.)	Chiwa Saitō	April 16, 2021
Kizumonogatari	Marina Inoue	May 21, 2021
Nisemonogatari (1)	Takahiro Sakurai	June 18, 2021
Nisemonogatari (2)	Maaya Sakamoto	July 16, 2021
Nekomonogatari (Black)	Emiri Katō	August 20, 2021
Nekomonogatari (White)	Miyuki Sawashiro	September 17, 2021
Kabukimonogatari	Yuka Iguchi	October 15, 2021
Hanamonogatari	Yui Horie	November 19, 2021
Otorimonogatari	Shin-ichiro Miki	December 17, 2021
Onimonogatari	Eri Kitamura	January 21, 2022
Koimonogatari	Satsuki Yukino	February 18, 2022
Tsukimonogatari	Ryoko Shiraishi	March 18, 2022
Koyomimonogatari	Saori Hayami	April 15, 2022
Owarimonogatari (1)	Kaori Mizuhashi	May 20, 2022
Owarimonogatari (2)	Chiwa Saitō	June 17, 2022
Owarimonogatari (3)	Emiri Katō	July 15, 2022
Zoku Owarimonogatari	Marina Inoue	August 19, 2022
Orokamonogatari	Takahiro Sakurai	September 16, 2022
Wazamonogatari	Shin-ichiro Miki	October 21, 2022
Nademonogatari	Satsuki Yukino	November 18, 2022
Musubimonogatari	Kana Hanazawa	December 16, 2022
Shinobumonogatari	Ryoko Shiraishi	January 20, 2023
Yoimonogatari	Satsuki Yukino	February 17, 2023
Amarimonogatari	Saori Hayami	March 17, 2023
Ōgimonogatari	Yui Horie	April 21, 2023
Shinomonogatari (1)	Ryoko Shiraishi	May 19, 2023
Shinomonogatari (2)	Emiri Katō	June 16, 2023
Ikusamonogatari	Yoko Hikasa	December 1, 2023
Mijikanamonogatari	Takahiro Sakurai	November 21, 2025

== List of short short stories ==
Short short story	Published in	Date
"Hitagi Buffet" (ひたぎブッフェ)	Bakemonogatari Anime Complete Guidebook (化物語アニメコンプリートガイドブック)	October 28, 2010
"Mayoi Room" (まよいルーム)	Bakemonogatari Anime Complete Guidebook (化物語アニメコンプリートガイドブック)	October 28, 2010
"Suruga Court" (するがコート)	Bakemonogatari Anime Complete Guidebook (化物語アニメコンプリートガイドブック)	October 28, 2010
"Nadeko Pool" (なでこプール)	Bakemonogatari Anime Complete Guidebook (化物語アニメコンプリートガイドブック)	October 28, 2010
"Tsubasa Song" (つばさソング)	Bakemonogatari Anime Complete Guidebook (化物語アニメコンプリートガイドブック)	October 28, 2010
"Tsukihi Eternal" (つきひエターナル)	Nisemonogatari Anime Complete Guidebook (偽物語アニメコンプリートガイドブック)	September 28, 2012
"Karen Arm Leg" (かれんアームレッグ)	Nisemonogatari Anime Complete Guidebook (偽物語アニメコンプリートガイドブック)	September 28, 2012
"Hitagi Neck" (ひたぎネック)	Nisemonogatari Anime Complete Guidebook (偽物語アニメコンプリートガイドブック)	September 28, 2012
"Shinobu House" (しのぶハウス)	Nisemonogatari Anime Complete Guidebook (偽物語アニメコンプリートガイドブック)	September 28, 2012
"Tsubasa Board" (つばさボード)	Yomiuri Shimbun	July 6, 2013
"Tsubasa Board" (つばさボード)	Blu-ray and DVD volume 1 of Onimonogatari	April 23, 2014
"Mayoi Castle" (まよいキャッスル)	Yomiuri Shimbun	August 17, 2013
"Mayoi Castle" (まよいキャッスル)	Blu-ray and DVD volume 1 of Onimonogatari	April 23, 2014
"Hitagi Coin" (ひたぎコイン)	Bakemonogatari [Introduction] (化物語 ［入門編］)	September 13, 2013
"Nadeko Mirror" (なでこミラー)	Yomiuri Shimbun	September 21, 2013
"Nadeko Mirror" (なでこミラー)	Blu-ray and DVD volume 2 of Onimonogatari	May 28, 2014
"Shinobu Science" (しのぶサイエンス)	Yomiuri Shimbun	October 26, 2013
"Shinobu Science" (しのぶサイエンス)	Blu-ray and DVD volume 1 of Onimonogatari	April 23, 2014
"Hitagi Figure" (ひたぎフィギュア)	Bakemonogatari Premium Item Box (「化物語」PremiumアイテムBOX)	November 22, 2013
"The Beautiful Princess" (うつくし姫)	Anime Monogatari Series Heroine Book #3 Shinobu Oshino (アニメ<物語>シリーズヒロイン本 其ノ參 忍野忍, Anime Monogatari Shirīzu Hiroin Bon Sono San Oshino Shinobu)	November 22, 2013
"The Beautiful Princess" (うつくし姫)	Wazamonogatari (業物語)	January 14, 2016
"Hitagi Salamander" (ひたぎサラマンダー)	Yomiuri Shimbun	November 23, 2013
"Hitagi Salamander" (ひたぎサラマンダー)	Blu-ray and DVD volume 2 of Onimonogatari	May 28, 2014
"Hitagi Throwing" (ひたぎスローイング)	Anime Monogatari Series Heroine Book #5: Hitagi (アニメ＜物語＞シリーズヒロイン本 其ノ伍 戦場ヶ原ひたぎ)	April 2, 2014
"Suruga Palace" (するがパレス)	Blu-ray and DVD volume 1 of Onimonogatari	April 23, 2014
"Yotsugi Future" (よつぎフューチャー)	Blu-ray and DVD volume 2 of Onimonogatari	May 28, 2014
"Ōgi Travel" (おうぎトラベル)	Blu-ray and DVD volume 2 of Onimonogatari	May 28, 2014
"Suruga Neat" (するがニート)	Yomiuri Shimbun	August 16, 2014
"Rōka God" (ろうかゴッド)	Anime Monogatari Series Heroine Book #6: Suruga (アニメ＜物語＞シリーズヒロイン本 其ノ陸 神原駿河)	September 19, 2014
"Shinobu Figure" (しのぶフィギュア)	Nisemonogatari Premium Item Box (「偽物語」PremiumアイテムBOX)	November 21, 2014
"Karen Brushing" (かれんブラッシング)	Anime Monogatari Series Heroine Book #7: Fire Sisters (アニメ＜物語＞シリーズヒロイン本 其ノ漆 ファイヤーシスターズ)	July 9, 2015
"Tsukihi Brushing" (つきひブラッシング)	Anime Monogatari Series Heroine Book #7: Fire Sisters (アニメ＜物語＞シリーズヒロイン本 其ノ漆 ファイヤーシスターズ)	July 9, 2015
"Koyomi History" (こよみヒストリー)	Madogatari Exhibition (MADOGATARI展) pamphlet	November 27, 2015
"Yotsugi Stress" (よつぎストレス)	Anime Monogatari Series Heroine Book #8: Yotsugi (アニメ＜物語＞シリーズヒロイン本 其ノ捌 斧乃木余接)	December 23, 2015
"Hito Toshite" (人として)	Movie Kizumonogatari Visual Book Part 2 (映画「傷物語」ビジュアルブック PART2)	January 14, 2017
"Dōka Shite" (どうかして)	Movie Kizumonogatari Visual Book Part 2 (映画「傷物語」ビジュアルブック PART2)	January 14, 2017
"Soshite" (そして)	Movie Kizumonogatari Visual Book Part 2 (映画「傷物語」ビジュアルブック PART2)	January 14, 2017
"Dōshite" (どうして)	Nisio Isin Matsuri 2016 Special Fanbook (西尾維新祭2016 SPECIAL FANBOOK)	March 2017
"Dōshite" (どうして)	Movie Kizumonogatari Complete Guide Book (映画「傷物語」COMPLETE GUIDE BOOK)	November 29, 2017
"Mayoi Welcome" (まよいウエルカム)	Prize to winners of the Nisio Isin no Chōsenjō (西尾維新の挑戦状) event at AnimeJapan 2017	March 26, 2017
"Koyomi Dictionary" (こよみディクショナリ)	Nisio Isin Daijiten Pamphlet (西尾維新大辞展)	July 26, 2017
"Kokoro Shite" (心して)	Movie Kizumonogatari Complete Guide Book (映画「傷物語」COMPLETE GUIDE BOOK)	November 29, 2017
"Hitagi Dish" (ひたぎディッシュ)	Special edition of volume 1 of Bakemonogatari (manga)	June 15, 2018
"Hitagi Hermit Crab" (ひたぎハーミットクラブ)	Special edition of volume 2 of Bakemonogatari (manga)	August 17, 2018
"Sodachi Mirror" (そだちミラー)	Leaflet for the theatrical release of Zoku Owarimonogatari	November 10, 2018
"Sodachi Mirror" (そだちミラー)	Blu-ray and DVD volume 1 of Zoku Owarimonogatari	February 27, 2019
"Mayoi Name" (まよいネーム)	Special edition of volume 3 of Bakemonogatari (manga)	November 16, 2018
"Mayoi Ghost" (まよいゴースト)	Special edition of volume 4 of Bakemonogatari (manga)	January 17, 2019
"Ōgi Reflect" (おうぎリフレクト)	Blu-ray and DVD volume 2 of Zoku Owarimonogatari	March 27, 2019
"Suruga Speed" (するがスピード)	Special edition of volume 5 of Bakemonogatari (manga)	April 17, 2019
"Suruga Velocity" (するがヴェロシティ)	Special edition of volume 6 of Bakemonogatari (manga)	July 17, 2019
"Nadeko Rope" (なでこロープ)	Special edition of volume 7 of Bakemonogatari (manga)	October 17, 2019
"Nadeko Courtship" (なでこコートシップ)	Special edition of volume 8 of Bakemonogatari (manga)	February 17, 2020
"Hitagi Nashorn" (ひたぎナースホルン)	Special edition of volume 9 of Bakemonogatari (manga)	May 15, 2020
"Mayoi Escargot" (まよいエスカルゴ)	Special edition of volume 10 of Bakemonogatari (manga)	August 17, 2020
"Suruga Earthworm" (するがアースワーム)	Special edition of volume 11 of Bakemonogatari (manga)	November 17, 2020
"Nadeko Eye Level" (なでこアイレベル)	Special edition of volume 12 of Bakemonogatari (manga)	February 17, 2021
"Tsubasa Ranking" (つばさランキング)	Special edition of volume 13 of Bakemonogatari (manga)	May 17, 2021
"Kiss-Shot Ranking" (きすしょっとランキング)	Special edition of volume 14 of Bakemonogatari (manga)	August 17, 2021
"Mayoi Heaven" (まよいヘブン)	Special edition of volume 15 of Bakemonogatari (manga)	November 17, 2021
"Sodachi Sisterhood" (そだちシスターフッド)	Monogatari Series: Monster Season Retrospective Booklet distributed in the Japanese bookstores	December 11, 2021
"Hitagi Graph" (ひたぎグラフ)	Special edition of volume 16 of Bakemonogatari (manga)	February 17, 2022
"Suruga Basket" (するがバスケット)	Special edition of volume 17 of Bakemonogatari (manga)	May 17, 2022
"Nadeko Dinosaur" (なでこダイナソー)	Special edition of volume 18 of Bakemonogatari (manga)	August 17, 2022
"Tsubasa Shelf" (つばさシェルフ)	Special edition of volume 19 of Bakemonogatari (manga)	November 17, 2022
"Shinobu Name" (しのぶネーム)	Special edition of volume 20 of Bakemonogatari (manga)	January 17, 2023
"Karen Violence" (かれんバイオレンス)	Special edition of volume 21 of Bakemonogatari (manga)	March 16, 2023
"Tsukihi Endless" (つきひエンドレス)	Special edition of volume 22 of Bakemonogatari (manga)	May 17, 2023
"Nadeko Past" (なでこパスト)	Monogatari Series website	June 30, 2024
"Shinobu Future" (しのぶフューチャー)	Monogatari Series website	June 30, 2024
"Yotsugi Song" (よつぎソング)	Gift from Nisio to Ayase from Yoasobi	September 11, 2024
"Yotsugi Blank" (よつぎブランク)	Posted on the official Nisio Isin X account.	November 11, 2025
"Koyomi Fifties" (こよみフィフティーズ)	Short story that was available in the Shaft 50th Anniversary Exhibition held from January 8 until January 18, 2026, in Japan.	January 8, 2026

=== Mijikanamonogatari ===
Kodansha revealed that Mijikanamonogatari (短物語(ミジカナモノガタリ), "Short Story" or "Short Stories") was scheduled to be released July 3, 2024 (ISBN 978-4-06-536177-1). The book contains 39 short stories, 33 of which were previously released and 6 new stories. (Note: The Amazon sales listing states "... the initial 33 stories plus 6 newly written short stories" (初期三十三編に六つの書き下ろし短々編を加えた), however "Koyomi Dictionary" (こよみディクショナリ) was not included despite being published before "Kokoro Shite" (心して). The delay of the release also meant that two of the new short stories, "Nadeko Past" (なでこパスト) and "Shinobu Future" (しのぶフューチャー), actually got published online before the physical book: in the end, 35 of the short stories of the book were previously released, and only 4 were actual new stories.) On June 12, 2024, Kodansha announced that the book would be delayed after it was discovered that a story that should have been included was inadvertently left out. The publication date was later confirmed to be September 11, 2024.

No.	Title	Release date	ISBN
	Mijikanamonogatari (短物語(ミジカナモノガタリ))	September 11, 2024	978-4-06-536177-1
"Hitagi Buffet" (ひたぎブッフェ); "Mayoi Room" (まよいルーム); "Suruga Court" (するがコート); "Nadeko Pool" (なでこプール); "Tsubasa Song" (つばさソング); "Hitagi Neck" (ひたぎネック); "Karen Arm Leg" (かれんアームレッグ); "Tsukihi Eternal" (つきひエターナル); "Shinobu House" (しのぶハウス); "Tsubasa Board" (つばさボード); "Mayoi Castle" (まよいキャッスル); "Hitagi Coin" (ひたぎコイン); "Nadeko Mirror" (なでこミラー); "Shinobu Science" (しのぶサイエンス); "Hitagi Figure" (ひたぎフィギュア); "Hitagi Salamander" (ひたぎサラマンダー); "Hitagi Throwing" (ひたぎスローイング); "Suruga Palace" (するがパレス); "Yotsugi Future" (よつぎフューチャー); "Ōgi Travel" (おうぎトラベル); "Suruga Neat" (するがニート); "Rōka God" (ろうかゴッド); "Shinobu Figure" (しのぶフィギュア); "Karen Brushing" (かれんブラッシング); "Tsukihi Brushing" (つきひブラッシング); "Koyomi History" (こよみヒストリー); "Yotsugi Stress" (よつぎストレス); "Hito Toshite" (人として); "Dōka Shite" (どうかして); "Soshite" (そして); "Dōshite" (どうして); "Kokoro Shite" (心して); "Mayoi Welcome" (まよいウエルカム); "Yotsugi Snow Dome" (よつぎスノードーム) (Note: newly written story published with the book); "Ōgi Road Movie" (おうぎロードムービー); "Sodachi Penalty" (そだちペナルティ); "Shinobu Tonight" (しのぶトゥナイト); "Nadeko Past" (なでこパスト) (Note: newly written story published online before the book due to the delay); "Shinobu Future" (しのぶフューチャー)

=== Mazemonogatari ===
Mazemonogatari (混物語(マゼモノガタリ)) is a collection of short stories featuring characters from Nisio Isin's other works. Twelve of these stories were first distributed in Japanese cinemas during the Japanese theatrical releases of Kizumonogatari Part 1: Tekketsu, Kizumonogatari Part 2: Nekketsu and Kizumonogatari Part 3: Reiketsu. A collected volume of these stories, alongside three previously unpublished ones, was published by Kodansha on February 6, 2019. (ISBN 978-4-06-513292-0)

Episode	Short story	Character	Series	Period of distribution
Oblivion (第忘話)	"Kyōko Balance" (きょうこバランス)	Kyōko Okitegami	Bōkyaku Tantei	January 8–15, 2016
Strong (第強話)	"Jun Build" (じゅんビルド)	Jun Aikawa	Saikyō	January 16–22, 2016
Law (第法話)	"Nomi Rule" (のみルール)	Nomi Chinō	Densetsu	January 23–29, 2016
Eye (第眼話)	"Mayumi Red Eye" (まゆみレッドアイ)	Mayumi Dōjima	Pretty Boy	January 30–February 5, 2016
Illness (第病話)	"Kuroneko Bed" (くろねこベッド)	Kuroneko Byōinzaka	Sekai	August 19–26, 2016
Blood (第血話)	"Risuka Blood" (りすかブラッド)	Risuka Mizukura	Risuka	August 27–September 2, 2016
Sword (第刀話)	"Hitei Clear" (ひていクリア)	Hitei-hime	Katanagatari	September 3–9, 2016
Kill (第殺話)	"Iori Fuga" (いおりフーガ)	Iori Mutō	Ningen	September 10–16, 2016
Army (第軍話)	"Shiogi Ranger" (しおぎレンジャー)	Shiogi Hagihara	Zaregoto	January 6–13, 2017
Invitation (第招話)	"Akari Triple" (あかりトリプル)	Akari Chiga	Zaregoto	January 14–20, 2017
Eat (第喰話)	"Rizumu Rock 'n" (りずむロックン)	Rizumu Niōnomiya	Zaregoto	January 21–27, 2017
University (第大話)	"Mikoko Community" (みここコミュニティ)	Mikoko Aoī	Zaregoto	January 28–February 3, 2017
Hero (第英話)	"Kū Invisible" (くうインビジブル)	Kū Sorakara	Densetsu	—
Deceive (第騙話)	"Rai Roulette" (らいルーレット)	Rai Fudatsuki	Pretty Boy	—
Final (第終話)	"Magokoro Finisher" (まごころフィニッシャー)	Magokoro Omokage	Zaregoto	—

== Other related works ==
- Original Drama CD Hyakumonogatari (オリジナルドラマCD 佰物語, Orijinaru Dorama Shīdi Hyakumonogatari), released on August 4, 2009.
- "Challenge to the Readers" (読者への挑戦状, Dokusha e no Chosenjo) – Ōgi's challenge to the readers published as part of the serialization of Ōgi Formula in Bessatsu Shonen Magazine, October 2013 issue, released on September 9, 2013.
- "Black Hanekawa's Cat Sign Astrology" (ブラック羽川の12猫座占い, Burakku Hanekawa no Jū Ni Nekoza Uranai), published in Anime Monogatari Series Heroine Book #1: Tsubasa (アニメ＜物語＞シリーズヒロイン本 其ノ壹 羽川翼, Anime Monogatari Shirīzu Hiroin Bon Sono Ichi Hanekawa Tsubasa), released on September 20, 2013.
- "The Stray Snail" (まいごのかたつむり, Maigo no Katatsumuri), illustrated by Hiroki Haritama and published in Anime Monogatari Series Heroine Book #2: Mayoi (アニメ＜物語＞シリーズヒロイン本 其ノ貮 八九寺真宵, Anime Monogatari Shirīzu Hiroin Bon Sono Ni Hachikuji Mayoi), released on October 30, 2013.
- "Kimi to Nadekko!" (キミとなでっこ!), illustrated by Ema Tōyama, published in Anime Monogatari Series Heroine Book #4: Nadeko (アニメ＜物語＞シリーズヒロイン本 其ノ肆 千石撫子, Anime Monogatari Shirīzu Hiroin Bon Sono Shi Sengoku Nadeko) and the August 2014 issue of Aria, released on January 31, 2014, and June 28, 2014, respectively, and included in the Blu-ray and DVD volume 2 of Koimonogatari, released on July 23, 2014.
- "Koyomi Araragi, Tsubasa Hanekawa, Nadeko Sengoku's Hobonichi Techo" (阿良々木暦、羽川翼、千石撫子のほぼ日手帳, Araragi Koyomi, Hanekawa Tsubasa, Sengoku Nadeko no Hobonichi Techō), published in the Hobonichi Techo 2015 Official Guide Book (ほぼ日手帳公式ガイドブック2015 LIFEのBOOK, Hobonichi Techō Kōshiki Gaido Bukku Ni Sen Jū Go Raifu no Bukku), released on August 26, 2014.
- Tsukimonogatari Episode Cross: Tsubasa Lion (月物語 第交話 つばさライオン, Tsukimonogatari Dai Kō Wa Tsubasa Raion), included in the special edition of volume 12 of March Comes in like a Lion, released on September 29, 2016.
- Emergency Dialogue! Nonsense Bearer x Koyomi Araragi (緊急対談！戯言遣い×阿良々木暦, Kinkyū Taidan! Zaregoto Tsukai × Araragi Koyomi), released on February 22, 2023, as part of the celebration of Nisio Isin's 20-year career.
