= List of Monogatari characters =

Characters from the series, as designed for the anime by Akio Watanabe. From left to right, top to bottom: Meme Oshino, Ōgi Oshino, Sodachi Oikura, Yotsugi Ononoki, Deishū Kaiki, Tsukihi Araragi, Karen Araragi, Tsubasa Hanekawa, Suruga Kanbaru, Koyomi Araragi (center), Hitagi Senjōgahara, Nadeko Sengoku, Mayoi Hachikuji, and Shinobu Oshino.

The Monogatari series, comprising the light novels written by Nisio Isin and its anime and manga adaptations, has an extensive fictional cast. The series focuses on Koyomi Araragi, a former vampire who has since regained his humanity and now lives as a partial human with vampiric traits, as he meets various girls who contend with other supernatural threats, collectively known as "Oddities". He is initially assisted by Meme Oshino, an eccentric specialist in the area of combatting and exorcising Oddities, and later by Shinobu Oshino (formerly known as Kiss-shot Acerola-orion Heart-under-blade), the weakened form of the vampire who attacked and turned Koyomi, who now depends exclusively on his blood for sustenance. Koyomi is also commonly accompanied by the various girls he has helped in the past. He is sometimes opposed or aided by other specialists seeking to exterminate or manipulate Oddities for their own reasons.

== Main characters ==
=== Koyomi Araragi ===
Voiced by: Hiroshi Kamiya (Japanese); Erik Scott Kimerer (Audiobook) (English)

Koyomi Araragi (阿良々木 暦, Araragi Koyomi) is the overall main protagonist of the Monogatari series. He is a third-year high school student who fails every subject except math. After being attacked by a vampire during spring break and becoming a vampire himself, specialist Meme Oshino helps him become human again, though Koyomi retains several lingering side effects and vampiric powers such as enhanced regenerative abilities. As a result, he has concerns regarding his lifespan. These side effects are later revealed to be due to the bond that Shinobu and he share. He started dating Hitagi at the end of Mayoi Mai Mai and later becomes her husband.

After he graduated from Naoetsu high school, he majored in mathematics in Manase University along with Senjougahara and Oikura. He was frequently absent during lectures to help solve oddity related events throughout Monster Season. He later moved out of the Araragi residence to live next to Oikura. However, he soon returned to the Araragi residence during the Coronavirus pandemic to take care of his sisters. He would continue his university studies online through zoom until his graduation.

After graduating from university, Koyomi follows his parents' footsteps and becomes a police officer in the rumour squad, helping solve oddity related issues for the general public.

Although he is shown to be attracted to the other girls, he turns down their advances due to his loyalty to Hitagi. Other characters, particularly Mayoi and Hitagi, seem to speculate that Koyomi is a lolicon.

=== Hitagi Senjōgahara ===
Voiced by: Chiwa Saitō (Japanese); Erica Mendez (Audiobook) (English)

Hitagi Senjōgahara (戦場ヶ原 ひたぎ, Senjōgahara Hitagi) is the main character of Hitagi Crab. She is a weak-looking girl with an "incurable disease". She is in the same class as Koyomi, but she rarely speaks. During the period between both schools, she encountered a giant crab who stole her weight. Ever since, she avoids contact with everyone else, and threatens anyone who discovers her secret. She became anti-social and was very different from her personality from when she was in middle school. She calls herself a tsundere (but is mostly a yandere) and often speaks in an abusive style. At the end of Mayoi Mai Mai, she admits that she loves Koyomi, and they start dating.

After the events in Tsukihi Phoenix, she overcame all of her trauma and finally became a completely normal and cheerful girl. She starts referring to Araragi by a cute nickname, chuckling at small things, and sending e-mails full of Emojis, although her sharp tongue is still present, only toned down. She seems also to have a father complex, getting excited when she uses her father's blanket, so much so that she can't fall asleep. Koyomi says that he loves Hitagi the most. She seems to not be on very good terms with Karen and Tsukihi.

In Hitagi End after the events of Nadeko Medusa, Koyomi gets into trouble, swallowing her pride and feelings again to ask Kaiki - the one person whom she truly despises and hates - for help.

In University, she studied finance and lived in the women's dorm. In Ougi light, during a shrine visit with Koyomi to celebrate a new year, she decided to break up with him as she realized that their relationship began with her physically abusing Koyomi by stapling his mouth. However, Koyomi soon realized that this break up was due to a curse created by a Naoetsu high schooler. He soon swiftly resolved the curse and their relationship was mended. After graduating, she became a successful financial trader following her father's footstep, working overseas in her father's competitor. However, the long-distance relationship causes strain in her relationship with Koyomi, resulting in her moving back and starting a new branch in Japan after their third breakup.

In Hitagi Honeymoon, 2 years after her university graduation, Hitagi Senjougahara changed her name to Hitagi Araragi following her marriage ceremony at the North Shirahebi Shrine. She and Koyomi headed to Senjougahara along with Kanbaru and Shinobu for their Honeymoon. During the Honeymoon, she conversed with Shinobu for the first time, and ultimately suggested to adopt her as their legal child.

=== Mayoi Hachikuji ===
Voiced by: Emiri Katō

Mayoi Hachikuji (八九寺 真宵, Hachikuji Mayoi) is the main character of Mayoi Mai Mai. She is the ghost of a fifth-grade elementary-school girl. She was killed in a traffic accident while trying to reach her mother's home and has since unsuccessfully attempted to do so. She can be seen only by people who do not want to reach their destinations. Mayoi is often seen wearing an oversized pink backpack with her name on it. She claims that the backpack is just her overnight bag as she planned on spending the night at her mother's home when the accident occurred. Koyomi met her in a park on Mother's Day and offered to help her find her mother's home. She makes a lot of spelling mistakes and has a habit of mispronouncing Koyomi's family name. Her family name before her parents got divorced was Tsunade (綱手) She later graduates to become a "Wandering Spirit," after Koyomi and Hitagi help her reach her destination.

In Mayoi Jiangshi, Koyomi and Shinobu accidentally travel back in time 11 years, the day before Mayoi's death. Koyomi, wanting to prevent Mayoi from turning into a wandering spirit, helps her travel to her mother's house. After they return to the present, they find out the whole town is infested with zombies. In this history, Koyomi did not meet Mayoi, so during the events of Tsubasa Cat, he did not get the information regarding Shinobu, or go near Mister Donut, so Black Hanekawa killed him, causing this timeline's Shinobu to vow to destroy the world and fill it with zombie vampires, or 'Jiangshi'. While searching for a power spot, Koyomi and Shinobu attract the zombies but are saved by a grown Hachikuji. It seems that Mayoi was not happy that she became a spirit, but was happy that as a spirit, she was able to meet Koyomi.

Later on, Mayoi's existence is threatened by the "darkness", a manifestation of the natural order, which destroys things that are lying about their nature, in this case being Mayoi forsaking the role of the Lost Snail. With the advice of Izuko Gaen, Mayoi chooses to pass on to the afterlife without a good-bye exchanged between her and Araragi, something the latter admits to regretting at a later time.

Mayoi later become a God after being resurrected by Arargi during his trip to hell.

Koyomi also stated that he is the happiest when talking to Mayoi.

=== Suruga Kanbaru ===
Voiced by: Miyuki Sawashiro

Suruga Kanbaru (神原 駿河, Kanbaru Suruga) is the main character of Suruga Monkey. She is Koyomi's underclassman, star player of the school's basketball team and one of Hitagi's acquaintances from junior high school. Immediately after she entered senior high school, she became aware of Hitagi's secret and was threatened by her, just as Koyomi was. She is an admitted lesbian (although 'jokingly' desiring to be Koyomi's mistress if he ever gets married), fujoshi, lolicon, and masochist. In elementary school, she inherited what she thought was a Monkey's Paw. When she made her third wish on it, a monkey-like paw began growing in her left arm. She starts stalking Koyomi after she discovers he is dating Hitagi. She becomes friends with Koyomi and Hitagi after Koyomi rids her of the Rainy Devil curse. She also begins growing her hair longer.

In Suruga Devil, a rumor circulates about a devil solving other people's problems. Fearing that she might be the rumored 'Devil', Suruga decides to investigate and finds out that the rumored Devil is actually an old basketball rival of hers named, Rōka Numachi. Kanbaru is still worried about the effects of the Rainy Devil, even though it has been dispersed, to the point that, whenever she goes to sleep, she binds her devil's arm to a pillar so that she cannot commit crimes while sleepwalking. She checks the newspaper everyday so that she can make sure she did not make any bad news unconsciously. She has dreams of her mother once in a while which give her weird life lessons.

She is called Suruga Kanbaru now but she was previously named Suruga Gaen. Suruga's mother had some kind of connection to oddities as she had inherited the devil's left arm from her mother. Her mother and father were revealed to have eloped as the Kanbaru family did not approve of their relationship. Kanbaru is also the only person that Kaiki will ever treat well.

After high school, she wanted to became a physician. She studied in university while working part time in a hospital to gain relevant industry experience.

=== Nadeko Sengoku ===
Voiced by: Kana Hanazawa

Nadeko Sengoku (千石 撫子, Sengoku Nadeko) is the main character of Nadeko Snake. She is Tsukihi's friend from elementary school. She has a shy personality, always wears a waist pouch, always casts her eyes downward, keeps her bangs covering her eyes, and can be easily amused. Koyomi played with her a lot whenever she visited his house after being invited by his sisters. She is put under a curse by a classmate, causing an invisible snake to strangle her, until Koyomi finds out and offers his help. It is revealed that there were two snakes strangling Nadeko. One was placed by the boy Nadeko rejected, and the other was placed by the girl who was in love with the boy Nadeko rejected. Koyomi managed to get rid of the first one but was unable to remove the second one. The snake then returned to the boy who cursed her, cursing him instead. She refers to Koyomi as Koyomi-onii-chan. She's quite protective of her hair (particularly her forelocks) thinking that it's her place to guard more than her panties. When she finally combs her forelocks aside in Nisemonogatari, Koyomi comments that she has a glare just like a serpent.

In Nadeko Medusa, during Halloween, Nadeko meets a girl named Ōgi, after which she is able to see a white snake who claims to be one of the snakes she killed during the events in "Nadeko Snake". This snake pressures her to atone for what she did by finding the remains of the snake when it was alive. However, it was actually a trap laid down by Ōgi, resulting in Nadeko finding a talisman in Araragi's room and becoming a God.

During Nadeko Draw, Nadeko created 4 shikigami to help her practice drawing. Her parents threatened to kick her out of the house if she does not graduate from middle school, so she thought she needed to master drawing before then to become a manga artist. However, the shikigamis escaped as they did not want to become present Nadeko's slaves. Nadeko proceeded to work with Ononoki to capture them all. Nadeko managed to capture two shikigamis with the help of Ougi. She found Ononoki's body broken up as she was on her way to capture the remaining two shikigami. She helped assemble her broken body, and teamed up with her to defeat the God Nadeko shikigami.

After graduating from middle school, Nadeko became a mangaka. She moved out on her own with the help of Gaen in exchange for working as a specialist. She later wrote 3 niche publications under the pen name "Sengoku Nadeshiko". Her works are described as "cute but dark" as they often take inspiration from her working as a specialist.

=== Tsubasa Hanekawa ===
Voiced by: Yui Horie (Japanese); Cristina Vee (Audiobook) (English)

Tsubasa Hanekawa (羽川 翼, Hanekawa Tsubasa) is the main character of Tsubasa Cat. She is Koyomi's classmate and the class representative. Koyomi describes her as "the class representative of all class representatives." Prior to the novel's beginning, she was possessed by a bakeneko during Golden Week due to family stress. Although it has since been resolved with the help of Shinobu and at the cost of her own memories, problems emerge again right before the school festival because of different stress. It is revealed by the bakeneko at the end of episode 14 of the anime that the source of the stress was her feelings for Araragi. The stress was so severe that the cat resurfaced again after only 2 weeks after Hitagi and Koyomi started dating, as compared to the 17 years of stress that Tsubasa got from her family. Despite Black Hanekawa possessing a female body, the spirit itself is male. When Tsubasa turns into Black Hanekawa, her hair turns into white and she grows cat ears.

Tsubasa Family tells the story of what happened during the nightmarish Golden Week when Tsubasa was possessed by the cat demon. On the first day of Golden Week, Koyomi, after thinking that he was in love with Tsubasa, goes out and stumbles upon Tsubasa with a bruise on her face caused by her "father". Shortly after, Tsubasa and Koyomi find a dead white cat without a tail beside the road. Tsubasa picks up the cat and asks Koyomi for help in burying it. Throughout the whole week, a monster cat is rumored to be seen attacking people. Oshino says that the oddity itself is a weak spirit, but having possessed Tsubasa, it has gained knowledge and strategy strong enough for it to rival even a vampire. If Black Hanekawa doesn't disappear soon, Tsubasa and the cat will merge with each other and the only way to stop Tsubasa then will be to kill her. Black Hanekawa has the verbal tic of changing words with "na" to "nya".

In Tsubasa Tiger, while on her way to school, Tsubasa meets a gigantic tiger named Kako who has the ability to talk. It was revealed that the tiger was created by Tsubasa feeling envy at her "parents" getting closer to each other, similarly to how stress caused Tsubasa to facilitate the second appearance of Black Hanekawa. If she is unable to resolve her problems, she will continue to create cat-like animal oddities fueled by her negative emotions, which will become stronger each time they appear. The sawarineko revealed that one of the reasons why it tried to help Tsubasa was that Tsubasa treats everyone as an equal. Tsubasa Tiger was written from Tsubasa's perspective instead of Koyomi's. Her catchphrase is "I don’t know everything, I just know what I know." Koyomi stated that he respects Tsubasa more than anyone else.

What is scary to note about Tsubasa is that all of the kai specialists noted her as "dangerous". Meme was wary of the first time he met Tsubasa, Episode thought that something was off about her and Kaiki stated that the person who arranged the meeting between him and Karen during the events of "Karen Bee" was not normal. Kaiki later on stated that he had no ideas about Tsubasa nor any information on what she is like, but that he would try to run away so as to never meet her. Tsubasa is so unnatural that in the near future, she would essentially become the second coming of Gaen. That is partly the reason why Black Hanekawa became a monster-class oddity despite the sawarineko being a low-class oddity because it had possessed Tsubasa. If the sawarineko possessed someone, it would not be as strong as when it did to Tsubasa.

In Tsubasa sleeping, Hanekawa recount his encounter with Dramaturgy to Oshino Meme during her search for him in Germany. She partnered up with Dramaturgy to defeat two problematic vampires, High-waist and low-rise in exchange for information regarding Oshino. She was set up as a human bait for the two vampires, who would capture her so that Dramaturgy could track them down and defeat them. However, Dramaturgy was defeated instead, leading to their captivity in a castle. Soon, High-waist and low-rise took her out of her cell and started playing a game that involved torturing her to death for their entertainment. However, it was at this time where the blood of kiss-shot that lied dormant in her body since kizumonogatari activates due to the briar thorns Dramaturgy gave her to commit suicide. She effortlessly defeated the two vampires, leading to high-waist and low-rise consuming each other's flesh to the point of death. After recounting this event, Hanekawa took Oshino back to Japan using a military jet to save Araragi.

After graduation, Hanekawa would travel the world, often involving herself with global humanitarian efforts. She became the president of the international landmine removal committee in exchange for borrowing a fighter jet to fetch Oshino from Antarctica to save Koyomi during Owarimonogatari. 4 years after the graduation ceremony in Zoku Owarimonogatari, Hanekawa would become an international celebrity. She worked hard to mediate conflicts between nation and erasing borders. Her final goal being a unified earth free from conflict. During her visit back to Japan, she erased her past by destroying all records of her childhood, including organizing the retrieval the underwear she had given to Araragi during Kizumonogatari and the braid he cut off after Bakemonogatari. It was revealed that the body double Hanekawa used to help distract the officials to sneak into the Araragi household could have been Kyouko Okitegami from Nisio's other series Bōkyaku Tantei, who was trained to become Hanekawa's body double due to fears of assassination attempts on her. Unfortunately this plan did not work, as Hanekawa was either assassinated or received life changing injuries from the assassination attempt that she forgets her own identity as Hanekawa and takes on a new identity as Okitegami.

=== Karen Araragi ===
Voiced by: Eri Kitamura

Karen Araragi (阿良々木 火憐, Araragi Karen) is the main character of Karen Bee. She is one of Koyomi's sisters. She is older than Tsukihi and enjoys outdoor activities. Despite being younger, Karen is taller than Koyomi, much to his dismay. In Karen Bee, her hot-headed personality and her habit of acting before thinking lead her to be stung by a bee, which leads to being poisoned with a terrible fever that lasts for 3 days. Like Hitagi, she refuses help from anyone which eventually leads to her and Koyomi fighting each other. Later, it was revealed that this event was set up by Kaiki. Karen and Tsukihi are nicknamed Tsuganoki Nichū no Fire Sisters (栂の木二中のファイヤーシスターズ; lit. Fire Sisters of Tsuganoki 2nd Junior High). It was revealed that the reason she and Tsukihi found boyfriends was so that Koyomi would become jealous. They found boyfriends in Koyomi's image with Karen's boyfriend being shorter than her. She and Tsukihi also thought that Tsubasa was Koyomi's girlfriend. In Karen Bee, it is revealed that she has fallen for her brother though does not voice it.

In Suruga Devil, she became a high school student and has got near Araragi to the point that Kanbaru worries that their relationship will go down a wrong turn (in other words, incest). It also seems that when Karen went to high school, her and Tsukihi's 'Fire Sisters' duo was disbanded.

After graduating high school, she became a police officer following her parents' footstep. She continued living in the Araragi household.

=== Tsukihi Araragi ===
Voiced by: Yuka Iguchi

Tsukihi Araragi (阿良々木 月火, Araragi Tsukihi) is the main character of Tsukihi Phoenix and one of Koyomi's sisters. She is the youngest of the Araragi family. Unlike her sister Karen, she prefers doing indoor activities. Contrary to her personality, she constantly changes her hair style and is short-tempered to the point that Koyomi describes her as having hysteria. She revealed that she, unlike Karen, was not that invested in preserving justice and was just using Karen's vision to run wild. She is actually the reincarnation of a phoenix and has been since before she was even born. The phoenix entered the baby's body when it was still in the womb and by now both beings' minds have become one. She is immortal, except the only thing that can end her life is a natural death from old age. When she was a child, she fell down a building due to antics related to the fire sisters and was hospitalised and her body was covered with scars, though there are no traces of them now. Tsukihi constantly changes her hairstyle due to her fickle attitude and the fact that her hair and nails grow longer in a short period of time. If styled in a bob-cut, it will grow to her back within a month. Karen and Tsukihi were supposed to be twins however, due to the phoenix possessing her, Tsukihi was born a few months later. Koyomi is actually more scared of Tsukihi than Karen despite Karen being physically stronger due to Tsukihi's unpredictable behaviour. Tsukihi and Karen are nicknamed Tsuga no Ki Nichū no Fire Sisters (栂の木二中のファイヤーシスターズ). It was revealed that the reason she and Karen found boyfriends was so that Koyomi would become jealous. They found boyfriends in Koyomi's image with Tsukihi's boyfriend being taller than she. She and Karen also thought that Tsubasa was Koyomi's girlfriend. She has feelings for her brother.

After her high school graduation, she studied in a local university. However, she soon dropped out, in favor of an overseas university. Reflecting her carefree and whimsical personality, she later dropped out a second time from the overseas university in favor of a dance school.

=== Shinobu Oshino ===
Voiced by: Maaya Sakamoto, Aya Hirano (Hyakumonogatari) (Japanese); Cristina Vee (Audiobook) (English)

Shinobu Oshino (忍野 忍, Oshino Shinobu) lives with Meme in the abandoned school building. She appears to be an eight-year-old girl, but she was originally a beautiful vampire named Kiss-shot Acerola-orion Heart-under-blade (キスショット･アセロラオリオン・ハートアンダーブレード, Kisushotto Aseroraorion Hātoandāburēdo) who has lived for more than 500 years (and happens to be the vampire that bit Koyomi). After the events at the end of Koyomi Vamp, she was left in a weakened condition with no powers or traces of her original personality, and therefore has had to abandon her former name and to nourish herself through occasionally sucking Araragi's blood. She was named Shinobu by Meme at the beginning of Hitagi Crab, suggesting her kanji name Shinobu (忍), having "heart" (心) under "blade" (刃), matches her original personality (but in typical Nisio Isin playing with kanji, the しのぶ pronunciation of the kanji 忍 means "fern"). Shinobu does not talk openly to anyone until "Karen Bee." During "Tsubasa Cat" she begins living in Araragi's shadow after being picked up from Mister Donut. Shinobu and Araragi form a connection by which they share each other's emotions and senses.

In Mayoi Jiangshi, in the alternate timeline, Shinobu goes berserk after Black Hanekawa kills Koyomi and swears to destroy the world created by the Jiangshi that has been swarming the town. It seems that Shinobu cares about Koyomi and when she sees the alternate timeline's Koyomi alive (and seemingly falls in love with him), she weeps blood. Acknowledging their vital connection, Koyomi states that he will die with Shinobu when the day comes. She does not seem to like Nadeko very much. In "Shinobu Time", a mysterious entity seems to be after her and she tells Koyomi that she has fought the entity before in her past but was then unable to defeat it.

=== Yotsugi Ononoki ===
Voiced by: Saori Hayami

Yotsugi Ononoki (斧乃木 余接, Ononoki Yotsugi) is Yozuru's shikigami, introduced in Tsukihi Phoenix. She is very stoic and always address herself with the masculine first-person pronoun boku and thinks of Yozuru as her sister. She has an ability called Unlimited Rulebook by which she can shape-shift her finger. She is challenged to a fight by Shinobu at the end of Tsukihi Phoenix and is beaten to a bloody pulp. Her name is determined by Kaiki as Yozuru does not have the courage to bind Yotsugi. She was once a human and has been resurrected as a tsukumogami by a half dozen genius specialists (including Kaiki and Yozuru) as a school project. They all had ownership over her but most of them gave up their claims. Yotsugi decided to have Yozuru as her master and in exchange, she becomes Yozuru's fighting partner. However, as a shikigami, she does not suffer any permanent damage.

=== Ōgi Oshino ===
Voiced by: Kaori Mizuhashi

Ōgi Oshino (忍野 扇, Oshino Ōgi) is a mysterious girl claimed to be Meme's niece. It is mentioned by Kaiki in season 2 that Meme Oshino had no family, thus the veracity of her claims is unsure. She is the main cause of leading Nadeko to become a Snake God (having leaked the information about the whereabouts of the talisman). She also happens to be the main cause of Deishū Kaiki's presumed death, having told a former victim of Kaiki's con about his whereabouts. She somehow seems indirectly related to Hachikuji's fate, with her appearance at the same time as the black object leading to Hachikuji to pass off to the next world, and her stated 'job' as that being of punishing liars, similar to that of the black object.

In Suruga Devil, a boy calling himself Ōgi Oshino tells Suruga that he is Meme's nephew. It also seems that no one can seem to remember having encountered Ōgi while not in his/her presence.

It is eventually revealed in Ōgi Dark that she is the alter ego of Koyomi created by Koyomi himself. As Koyomi realizes that he is too weak, too hesitant and too emotional to make harsh decisions during Shinobu Time, he subconsciously wished for a being that can judge him and correct everything wrong in this world. His wish came true as Ōgi Oshino, who will act as Koyomi's ultimate critic.

After Araragi's graduation, Ougi continued to stay in Naoetsu High School, pranking unsuspecting students. She later helped Nadeko retrieve her 5 shikigami during Nadeko Draw by driving her around in Araragi's Volkswagen Beetle.

=== Sodachi Oikura ===
Voiced by: Marina Inoue

Sodachi Oikura (老倉 育, Oikura Sodachi) is the main character of Sodachi Riddle and Sodachi Lost, is a girl with twin tails and was the class president of the first-year class shared by Hitagi and Koyomi. She loves mathematics, considering it beautiful. Sodachi despises Koyomi for unknown reasons but Koyomi believes it's because he is better at math than she is. (In a class test, Koyomi scores 100 while Sodachi scores 99). At school, she wants to be called "Euler" but ends up getting the nickname "How Much", a pun on her surname (お幾ら, o-ikura) and a reference to her personality.

Koyomi recalls an event involving Sodachi in "Ōgi Formula", two years before the present time, regarding suspected cheating on a math test. There had been a disparity in the math exam results between those who attended the group study and those who did not attend. Sodachi held a class meeting in order to determine the culprit who had leaked the questions for the exam and appointed Koyomi as the moderator of the class assembly as he was the only one who scored a 100 on the test. The class assembly itself was inconclusive, but Sodachi was pinned as the cheater who leaked the math questions through a majority vote. Koyomi is sure that Sodachi was not the perpetrator, but is powerless to stop the accusation because Sodachi herself is the assembly organizer. She did not attend for two years after the incident and had returned to school randomly 6 months before graduation.

She attended Manase University after her high school, where she studied mathematics and accounting. After her university graduation, she worked as an accountant in the public sector. She maintained an on and off friendship with Araragi during her time in university and beyond.

== Supporting characters ==
=== Meme Oshino ===
Voiced by: Takahiro Sakurai (Japanese); Keith Silverstein (Audiobook) (English)

Meme Oshino (忍野 メメ, Oshino Meme) is a middle-aged man who lives in an abandoned building. Being an expert in the aberrations field, he solves Koyomi's and others' problems, although requiring equal compensation. He likes to talk a lot and had even forced Shinobu to listen to some aberration myths. He came into town with the purpose of stabilizing the snake shrine and Kiss-shot and he had stayed longer than he anticipated because he grew attached to Koyomi. He has a tendency of never saying goodbye, and that he believes that people can only save themselves. It is assumed that he doesn't like people to know that he works hard and praise him. It was revealed that he is affiliated with Kaiki, Yozuru and Gaen as they were in the same club during university. Due to his involvement with creating Ononoki, he was cursed to continuously lose his place of residence. He considers himself as a pacifist and did not resort to violence except for the time he was dealing with the first appearance of Black Hanekawa. He also says that he's a neutral person and doesn't side with either humans nor kai. He will occasionally say, "You are really energetic, did something good happen?".

=== Deishū Kaiki ===
Voiced by: Shinichiro Miki

Deishū Kaiki (貝木 泥舟, Kaiki Deishū) is introduced in Karen Bee. He is a con man who dresses in a fully black suit and will require monetary compensation. He was a member of the club that Oshino, Yozuru and Gaen were in during university. He prefers "fakes" more than the real thing because as fakes acts more like the real thing, the fakes ended up surpassing the real thing. He loves money and doesn't like things that cannot be bought with money. His animal motif is a crow and in the novel, he is described as someone who laughs similarly like a crow. He doesn't believe in the existence of oddities, and consider himself as a fake specialist and that he only uses them to trick people out of money. Because of that, he is very knowledgeable about the details surrounding kais.

He was the first con artist of the five who tricked Senjōgahara's family out of their money after she had her weight taken away by the crab. He was also responsible for making her parents divorce. He returns to the town that the main characters are from in order to trick middle school girls out of their money. This time he was the one responsible for selling the information about the snake curse that led up to the case involving Nadeko.

Hitagi developed feelings for him when she thought he could cure her condition, which is presumably the real reason she desperately tried to keep Koyomi away from him and for her intense hatred of Kaiki after she got tricked by him. In the novel, it is implied, Kaiki has feelings for Hitagi, returned to town because of that and tells her that the man who tried to violate her died in an accident, arguably implying he killed him.

In Tsukihi Phoenix he sold the information about Tsukihi being a phoenix to Yozuru. His specialty is non-existent and impostor Oddities. Kaiki knew Kanbaru's mother in the past and he promised to take care of Kanbaru if anything happened. It turns out Kaiki was in love with Kanbaru's mother and that the latter is the one she will ever treat in a good way. For that reason, Kaiki agrees to help Hitagi when she asks for his help in Hitagi End. Despite claiming that he has no interest in Hitagi at all, Kaiki sometimes shows signs of respect and admiration for her, although he knows how much she despises him.

In Hitagi End Ononoki mentions that all his actions for splitting the Senjōgahara family, destroying the religious sect that Senjōgahara's mother was involved with might have been for Senjōgahara's sake. However, Ononoki concludes that it failed because he tried to do something which was not like him. Kaiki, however, sarcastically denies all of it.

In the end of Hitagi End, his fate is left unknown after being attacked by the student he conned who was ensnared by a reverse snake curse (and which he mentions may have been how Nadeko got her snake too in Nadeko Snake). The student, although driven with insanity from the curse pain, said that Ōgi had told him where Kaiki was.

However it is shown that he is alive and well in Suruga Devil, where he makes a formal appearance to Kanbaru and revealing his relationship with Tooe, Kanbaru's mom. This reveal shows that Kaiki's "death" in Hitagi End was another one of Kaiki's lies.

=== Yozuru Kagenui ===
Voiced by: Ryoko Shiraishi

Yozuru Kagenui (影縫 余弦, Kagenui Yozuru) is introduced in Tsukihi Phoenix. She is an onmyōji and one of Meme's clubmates at the university, where she earned her doctorate degree. One of the most notable thing about her is that she does not step on the ground. Between the three kouhais during university, she was the only one that graduated. She is physically the strongest human in the series and fights by using her fists that are powerful enough to punch through multiple floors to treat at once. It was revealed that as an exchange for her immense strength, she was given a condition to never step on the earth. Unlike Meme, Deishū, and Gaen, she works for free which means that she only hunts and kills oddities because that is what she truly wanted. Yozuru says that she is fond of Koyomi as an individual, however if Koyomi makes a move that is going against her sense of justice, she will not hesitate to kill him. Yozuru uses her judgement on which immortal kais to fight and hunt by separating them into what is alive forever and what is dead forever. She then hunts kai that are considered alive forever and that's why Yotsugi is her assistant as Yotsugi is technically not alive.

During Tsukihi Phoenix she received information from Kaiki concerning a phoenix. Her specialty is immortal Oddities. She considers herself as an ally of justice and would not hesitate to eliminate immortal kais despite the consequences.

During Shinobu Suicide, She elicits the help of Koyomi from Romania using a zoom call. She was heavily involved with combating the pandemic amongst vampires with 100% fatality rate. She used Ononoki to transport Koyomi to corpse castle, where she has set up base to treat Deathtopia. She had originally planned on infecting Koyomi to test the limits of the vampire "illness", but eventually reluctantly agreed to let Shunobu suck the blood of Deathtopia.

=== Izuko Gaen ===
Voiced by: Satsuki Yukino

Izuko Gaen (臥煙 伊豆湖, Gaen Izuko) is introduced in Tsubasa Tiger. She is a young-looking woman who wears hip-hop-esque clothes that are too big for her. She was the senpai of Oshino, Kaiki and Yozuru and it is implied that she has a connection to Kanbaru as her last name is the same as Kanbaru's mother. She is the most knowledgeable specialist in the series. Gaen claims she knows everything, she likes to brag about this and her catchphrase is "There is nothing I don't know, I know everything.". However, it is apparent that this statement is merely a bluff, as she needed to solicit the help of Koyomi in Shinobu Mustard in cracking the codes and solving the mystery behind the mummified girls. Gaen has five cellphones and gave Koyomi three of her contact numbers during the events of "Shinobu Time." Compared to Meme, who wants compensation, Kaiki, who works for money, and Yozuru, who works for free, Gaen demands "friendship" as a form of payment. In other words, she demands that people owe her a favor to be repaid later. She doesn't tell when or what favors she wants done and that she is essentially building a network of people who owe her favours, and use these favours as transactions to get what she wanted done. In Koyomi's case, in exchange for helping him during the events in Onimonogatari, Gaen demanded Koyomi to introduce her to Kanbaru but to keep a secret that she is Kanbaru's aunt.

=== Episode ===
Voiced by: Miyu Irino

Episode (エピソード, Episōdo) is a half-vampire introduced in Koyomi Vamp. He who was one of the three hunters that stole the arms and legs of Kissshot-Acerolaorion-Heartunderblade. When Koyomi became Kissshot's servant, he found that he had to battle Episode and the others to get Kisshot's body parts back and restore her to her normal form. While Koyomi battled Episode at his school's sport field, Tsubasa Hanekawa came to give Koyomi his cell phone, which he left at the cram school. Upon noticing her, Episode hurled the giant cross he carried on his shoulder at her, nearly killing her before Koyomi managed to save her by pouring his blood on her body. Later, in Tsubasa Tiger, Hanekawa runs into him again on the way to school, where he references that he's working with Gaen for an unspecified reason. He also stated that he was only six years old despite his appearance, which is the result of his vampire heritage.

=== Mrs. Araragi ===
Voiced by: Ai Orikasa

Mrs. Araragi is Koyomi, Karen and Tsukihi's mother. She and her husband are both police officers in senior positions.

=== Kako ===
Voiced by: Mitsuki Saiga

Kako (苛虎) is a giant tiger oddity that is the manifestation of Tsubasa's envy in Tsubasa Tiger. Shinobu is sure Tsubasa subconsciously modeled it on the kasha.

=== Kuchinawa ===
Voiced by: Yōji Ueda

Kuchinawa (クチナワ) is a snake god oddity that appears in Nadeko Medusa that claims to be the god of the snakes Nadeko killed. He claims he wants her to atone for killing his compatriots, but he manipulates her into becoming an aberration. Later in the story it was shown that he was only an imagination of Nadeko, only becoming real upon Nadeko's deification.

=== Rōka Numachi ===
Voiced by: Kana Asumi

Rōka Numachi (沼地 蠟花, Numachi Rōka) is first introduced in Suruga Devil. She is a middle-school basketball player and arch-rival of Suruga. A serious leg injury prematurely ends her basketball career. She later makes her re-appearance as the "Devil" during Suruga's 3rd-year in high school. Her role is to collect other people's misfortunes as a non-profit service; in the process, she also collects devil parts after learning about oddities from Deishū.

=== Deathtopia Virtuoso Suicide-Master ===
Voiced by: Rika Fukami

Deathtopia Virtuoso Suicide-Master (デストピア・ヴィルトゥオーゾ・スーサイドマスター, Desutopia Virutuōso Sūsaidomasutā) is natural born vampire first introduced in Acerola Bon Appétit. She described herself as the death-prepared, death-inevitable, death-certain vampire. She has created many minions during her over 1000 years lifespan, the most notable ones being Kiss-shot Acerola-orion Heart-under-blade, Tropicalesque Home-A-Wave Dog-Strings and Harimaze Kie.

During Acerola Bon Appétit, she had stumbled upon Princess Acerola and attempted to eat her. However, due to Princess Acerola's beauty, she was unable to do so, and resulted in her starving to death many times. Eventually she decided to turn Princess Acerola into a vampire instead of eatting her, turning Princess Acerola into Kiss-shot.

In Shinobu Mustard, Deathtopia decided to pay Shinobu a visit for the first time since 600 years. Along the way, she decided to eat Harimaze Kie due to her extreme anorexia. However, she got food poisoning from eating her, resulting in Deathtopia fainting and Harimaze Kie becoming a vampire. She was later resurrected by Araragi and reunited with Shinobu. She was soon exiled from Japan and placed under supervision by the specialists due to the events that transpired.

One year later, Deathtopia was infected with a curse caused by Tropicalesque that triggered during her reunion with Shinobu. She was on the verge of death until she was reverted into a human by Shinobu's power drain under the supervision of Kagenui. On Araragi's day of graduation from Manase University, Deathtopia succumbed to Coronavirus. She had lived a happy life during her final days, where she had frequent zoom calls with Shinobu.

=== Meniko Hamukai ===
Voiced by: Momo Asakura

Meniko Hamukai (食飼 命日子, Hamukai Meniko) is a friend Araragi made in Manase university. She specialises in encryption and wishes to work for the police's cyber security division in the future. Meniko is one of the few friends of Araragi that is uninvolved with oddities. She debuted in Shinobu Mustard, where she helped Araragi decrypt codes in the vampire investigation.

Meniko is an extravert who participated in over 25 societies in Manase University. During Ōgi Light, she would become a victim of an oddity phenomenon when her boyfriend would insistently apologize to her both privately and publicly for his inappropriate behavior. She sought advice from Araragi on this matter, and eventually broke up with her boyfriend.

=== Seiu Higasa ===
Voiced by: Yoko Hikasa

Seiu Higasa (日傘 星雨, Higasa Seiu) is a close friend of Kanbaru in the basketball team. She debuted in Hanamonogatari, where she had a brief conversation with Kanbaru about the Rainy Devil. She was also present in Owarimonogatari during the high school graduation.

Higasa later met Koyomi while assisting with the case involving Deathtopia by providing information of the girls' basketball team. After this event, she became a close associate of Koyomi. Her fascination with Araragi stems from the fact that Koyomi is a "celebrity" within Naoetsu Private High School. As he is infamous for his unusually low attendance rate and lack of social interactions with other students.

She catalysed the events in Yoimonogatari by informing Koyomi of a case of possible kidnapping. As her basketball teammate's senpai was worried that her step sister was missing. She also involved Araragi in making an inspirational video to improve the morale of the girls' basketball team as a response to the events of Shinobumonogatari.

== Merchandise ==
The popularity of the series has led to the production of figurines of the characters, as well as other merchandise featuring the cast, such as keychains and other items. In 2015, to commemorate their 10th anniversary, Monogatari anime producer Shaft opened the "Madogatari" exhibit, which ran in Tokyo from November 27 to December 22, 2015, before also having showings in Osaka and Sapporo. The exhibit showcased materials from, and illustrations of the characters of, both the Monogatari and Puella Magi Madoka Magica series. Merchandise featuring crossover between the characters of both series was produced for sale in commemoration of the exhibition, most notably prize figurines featuring outfit swaps between characters of the two franchises which were sold at the event and additionally distributed at arcades.
