= Tenjho Tenge =

Japanese manga series by Oh! great

- First tankōbon volume cover

天上天下 (Tenjō Tenge)
- Genre: Adventure; Martial arts; Supernatural
- Manga
- Written by: Oh! great
- Published by: Shueisha
- English publisher: NA: Viz Media; CMX Comics (former)
- Magazine: Ultra Jump
- Original run: July 25, 1997 – August 19, 2010
- Volumes: 22
- Anime television series
- Directed by: Toshifumi Kawase
- Produced by: Masao Maruyama
- Written by: Toshiki Inoue
- Music by: Yasunori Iwasaki
- Studio: Madhouse
- Licensed by: AUS: Madman Entertainment; NA: Discotek Media; UK: MVM Films
- Original network: TV Asahi
- English network: CA: G4techTV; US: Fuse; ZA: Animax
- Original run: April 1, 2004 – September 16, 2004
- Episodes: 24
- Original video animation

Ultimate Fight
- Directed by: Toshifumi Kawase
- Produced by: Masao Maruyama
- Written by: Kazuhiko Inukai
- Music by: Yasunori Iwasaki
- Studio: Madhouse
- Licensed by: AUS: Madman Entertainment; NA: Discotek Media; UK: MVM Films
- Released: March 16, 2005
- Runtime: 25 minutes (each)
- Episodes: 2
- Anime television film

The Past Chapter
- Directed by: Toshifumi Kawase
- Produced by: Masao Maruyama
- Written by: Toshiki Inoue
- Music by: Yasunori Iwasaki
- Studio: Madhouse
- Released: March 30, 2005
- Runtime: 90 minutes
- icon

Tenjho Tenge (Japanese: 天上天下, Hepburn: Tenjō Tenge (Note: The Japanese phrase Tenjho Tenge (天上天下, Tenjō Tenge; lit. 'Heaven and Earth') also is part of the full phrase Tenjō Tenge Yui Ga Doku Son (天上天下唯我独尊), which can be translated literally as 'throughout heaven and earth, I alone am the honored one', and in daily parlance now, the shortened form (yui ga dokuson) coming to mean 'a heavy-handed egotism'. Traditionally the phrase is attributed to the Buddha Sakyamuni, purported to have said this whilst taking seven steps immediately after being born, supposed to assert his unparalleled status.); lit. 'Heaven and Earth'), also written as Tenjo Tenge, is a Japanese manga series written and illustrated by Oh! great. It was serialized in Shueisha's seinen manga magazine Ultra Jump from July 1997 to August 2010, with its chapters collected in 22 tankōbon volumes. The story primarily focuses on the members of the Juken Club and their opposition, the Executive Council, which is the ruling student body of a high school that educates its students in the art of combat. As the story unfolds, both groups become increasingly involved with an ongoing battle that has been left unresolved for four hundred years.

It was adapted into a 24-episode anime television series broadcast on TV Asahi from April to September 2004. A two-episode original video animation (OVA) was released in March 2005.

Both versions of the series have been licensed for release in English language by two different companies. The manga was licensed and released by CMX beginning in 2005, which came under criticism by fans for editing its sexual content. When CMX closed down in 2010, after releasing 18 volumes, Viz Media picked up the rights and completed their own uncut release of the series in 2013. The anime was licensed and released by Geneon Entertainment, also beginning in 2005, however, it is now licensed by Discotek Media.

== Plot ==
The plot begins with Souichiro Nagi and his childhood best friend Bob Makihara going to their first day of high school at Toudou Academy. They had intended to rule the school by beating up anybody that got in their way, as they had done at their previous schools. They soon learn that Toudou is no ordinary high school, but rather a school that was founded to teach and integrate different fighting styles. Its students are skilled in the various arts of combat with some students possessing supernatural abilities, such as pyrokinesis, precognition, and superhuman strength based on the abilities to use their "spirit" or "ki" in Japanese. After an altercation with the Executive Council, Souichiro and Bob join the only surviving club that opposes them, the Juken club. As the storyline develops, both groups find they are becoming increasingly involved in a long enduring conflict that was left unresolved from the Japanese feudal era by some of the characters' ancestors.

== Media ==
=== Manga ===
Written and illustrated by Oh! Great, Tenjho Tenge was serialized in Shueisha's seinen manga magazine Ultra Jump from July 25, 1997, (Note: It started in the magazine's 11th issue, released on July 25, 1997.) to August 19, 2010. It was Oh! Great's first crossover mainstream manga from writing and illustrating hentai manga. Shueisha collected its chapters in 22 tankōbon' volumes, released from May 19, 1998, to November 19, 2010.

Tenjho Tenge was licensed for an English language publication by CMX, an imprint of DC Comics, as one of their launch titles and the first volume was released on February 16, 2005. Their version of the manga is heavily edited/censored in order for them to give it a Teen "rating" "to give it the widest possible distribution in the United States". According to CMX, these changes were made in conjunction with Shueisha and Tenjho Tenge creator Oh! Great, who examines each of their changes. This censorship however garnered quite a bit of controversy. CMX released eighteen volumes in North America before the company was shut down in July 2010. In November 2010, Viz Media acquired the rights to the Tenjho Tenge manga, stating that their version would be 100% uncut and faithful to the original Japanese. From June 21, 2011, to February 5, 2013, they released the series bi-monthly in eleven 2-in-1 volumes, which collects two individual volumes into a single large one. Viz Media's release also includes omake, color pages from the series's original run in Ultra Jump, and since each release cover two volumes, the second cover is included as a color insert.

=== Anime ===
The Tenjho Tenge anime was directed by Toshifumi Kawase, animated by Madhouse but the whole series is animated by DR MOVIE 1 Korean animation service studio, produced by TV Asahi and Avex Mode, the animation division of the Avex group of companies. The twenty-four episodes were originally aired weekly on TV Asahi in Japan on Thursdays from April 1, 2004, to September 16, 2004. These episodes were made into eight-volume DVD box sets. Two additional episodes were broadcast by TV Asahi in Japan on March 16, 2005, and released in the form of an original video animation named Tenjho Tenge: Ultimate Fight. The anime follows closely to its source material up to the manga's eighth volume with the exception of the sexual content which was toned down. The anime series was licensed in English by Geneon Entertainment.

In Australia and the UK, the series was released over seven volumes, and includes the OVA on the seventh disc. Almost 5 years after the closure of Geneon USA, Discotek Media re-licensed the series for a DVD release in 2013. Viewster later added the anime series into their streaming service alongside Galaxy Express 999 and Adieu Galaxy Express 999 anime films in 2016.

=== Music ===
The anime's music, including the background music and theme songs, were composed and performed by various artists, such as m.c.A.T and Aiko Kayo who provided the opening and closing themes songs of the anime. In 2004, Avex record label released the Tenjho Tenge soundtrack and a single. In 2005, Avex released two character collection albums.

== Reception ==
=== Manga ===
The Tenjho Tenge manga is described by Chris Beveridge of Anime On DVD as an "engaging mix of action and comedy together while wrapping it all up in a large plot that's fairly dark and really violent at times". Its creator, Oh! Great, is known to flavor his works with wanton sex and violence. Oh! Great uses sex as an important aspect of the storyline by using it as a powerful motivator both negatively and positively. He often has his characters contemplate the significance and importance of fighting as well as the meaning of strength. This conscious deliberation of subjective reasoning and objective truth between characters is the most imperative aspect of a story and is considered to be rare in manga. Dani Moure of Anime On DVD said readers may find that Oh! Great's narrative is occasionally hard to follow and at times the plot moves slowly. Oh! Great is known for his characters to have unrealistic body proportions, and Tenjho Tenge is no different. The majority of the female characters have "ultra large breasts" and the male characters are extraordinarily muscular, but this facilitates the characters' personalities to come through in their distinctive features. The manga sold over 10.7 million copies, and volumes regularly appeared in the top twenty best-selling manga on Japanese Tohan charts and North American Diamond Comic Distributors charts.

=== Anime ===
The Tenjho Tenge anime is described as a significantly toned down version of the Japanese manga, but still retains most of the spirit of its predecessor. Much of the nudity was removed by the animators, but was made up in the way of sexual innuendos, gratuitous cleavage, and panty shots. Since the anime is a close adaptation of the manga, critique of the plot is comparable to the manga's. Some reviewers felt that the anime was handled in a frantic and ill-planned manner that made the conclusion not satisfactory even with the original video animation. The animation done by Madhouse is considered to be well done. They used bright vibrant colors, solid backgrounds, and plenty of visible detail with very little pixelation or jagged movement, but at times used repeated character shots and animations. The animation done during the fight scenes is done in real time and is done as close to reality as possible while still bending, and often violating, the laws of physics. The early fight scenes are thought to be the "most intense seen in recent anime" by Kevin Gilvear of DVD Times. Carlo Santos of Anime News Network affirmed the quality of animation in these scenes does drop somewhat over time, but the action still looks better than the average fighting anime. Both the Japanese and English voice acting are considered to be good, but the English dub at times can be a little uneven. The English dub on occasion has poor dialogue, according to Anime News Network's Patrick King, which causes it to lose much of the anime's sincerity. Overall, the anime is considered to be above average, but suffers from a lack of a good ending, mainly because the anime only covered the first arc of the story.

The series' original soundtrack is considered to be average. Most of the music does well with setting the tone within the anime, although some reviewers found it to be somewhat repetitive. Some found the drama tracks to be unsatisfactory, even though they were "well executed". For many, the highlight of the soundtrack is m.c.A.T's "Bomb A Head!", which was used as the anime's opening song.

== Controversy ==
CMX came under a great deal of criticism from readers for its edits. These edits included the length and breadth of the book, censoring out anything they felt was questionable for a teen audience such as covering up or removing nudity, fanservice, and sexual innuendo as well as a removal of an omake chapter. This was done by a brand whose promotional material asserted that it offers "pure manga—100% the way the original Japanese creators want you to see it." One of grievances made against CMX is that the edits are not only severe, but very noticeable. One review states it is "possibly the most heavily censored title in the history of the North American manga industry."

In response, protesters boycotted the edited version and even started up their own website. Immediately following the controversy, Jake Tarbox, group editor of CMX, resigned from the company. "Tarbox was widely blamed by the fan community for the censoring of Tenjho Tenge, although inside sources suggest that Tarbox was not responsible for the decision to censor the manga." In the face of complaints, CMX had internal discussions about the possibility of publishing an unedited version of Tenjho Tenge, but decided to complete the current version. At the 2007 Anime Expo, CMX announced that they planned to change Tenjho Tenge's rating to Mature beginning with volume fifteen, but warned that it still would be edited, but more lightly. Jason Thompson declared CMX's censorship of the series one of "The Greatest Censorship Fails" in manga.
