= Oh! great =

Japanese manga artist (born 1972)

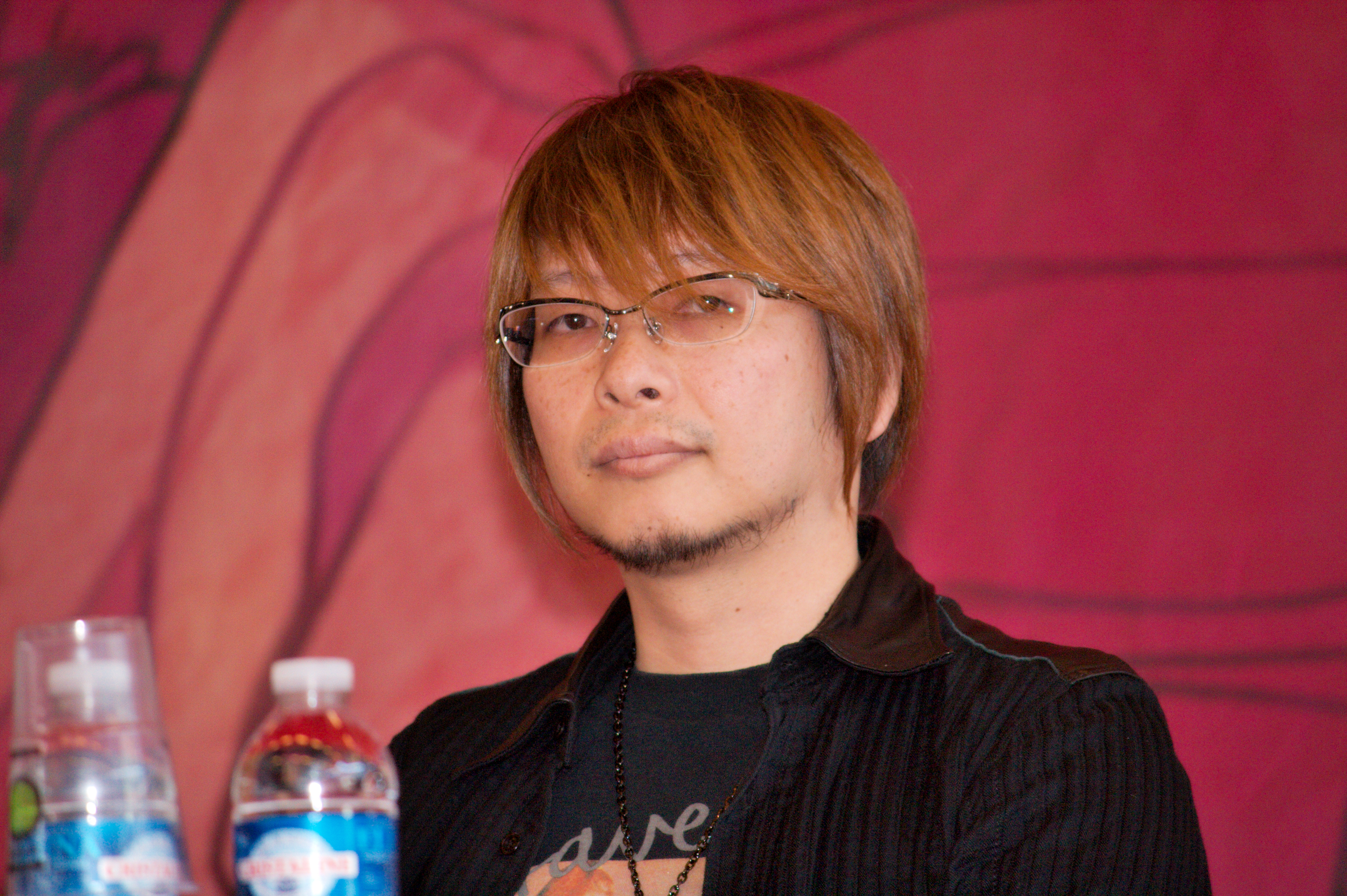
- Oh! great at Japan Expo 2008
- Born: Ito Ōgure 大暮 維人; February 22, 1972 (age 54); Hyūga, Miyazaki, Japan
- Occupations: Manga artist, illustrator, video game artist and character designer
- Years active: 1995–present
- Known for: Tenjho Tenge, Air Gear
- Awards: Kodansha Manga Award (2006)

Ito Ōgure (Japanese: 大暮 維人, Hepburn: Ōgure Ito; born February 22, 1972), known professionally as Oh! great, is a Japanese manga artist best known for his manga series Tenjho Tenge (1997–2010) and Air Gear (2002–2012). In 2006, Air Gear earned him the Kodansha Manga Award in the shōnen category.

== Career ==
Oh! great's favorite manga as a child included Fist of the North Star and Ring ni Kakero. While working as a salaryman, Oh! great acquired debt playing pachinko and entered a manga contest for the award money. He made his debut in Byakuya-Shobo's adult magazine Manga Hot Milk in 1995 with a manga called September Kiss.

His pen name "Oh! great" is a play on words. His real name, written in Japanese order (family name before given name), is "Ōgure Ito", which is pronounced similarly to and can be romanized the same as the Japanese rendering of the English words "Oh great", ōgurēto [oːɡɯɾeːto].

Oh! great also created the pornographic series Silky Whip, which was his first work published outside Japan by Eros Comix. Since 2018, he has been creating a manga adaptation of Nisio Isin's Bakemonogatari series of novels.

Outside of manga, Oh! great designed some of the alternate character outfits in the PlayStation 2 version of Tekken 5, and a guest character in Soul Calibur IV named Ashlotte.

== Style ==
Characteristics of Oh! great's style include violent plots, the use of English words amidst kanji and female characters that provide large amounts of fan service. Kai-Ming Cha of Publishers Weekly wrote that his "ability to weave together compelling narratives without shying away from sex or violence has set him apart from other manga-ka while earning him a number of loyal fans." She also wrote that his use of sex in Tenjho Tenge is recognized by readers as an important aspect of the story, hence their outrage when it was censored in its original English release. Oh! Great also often includes the themes of flashbacks and backstory in his stories.

== Works ==
- Biorg Trinity (illustrations only, text: Ōtarō Maijō)
- Tenjho Tenge
  - In one unusual Tokyo high school, education takes a backseat to brawling as warring clubs wreak havoc in the hallways and chaos in the classrooms, all vying to be the baddest team around! Although they often contribute their fair share, only a handful of students serve to stem the tide of violence in this untamed outpost. These are the few, the proud, the powerful: the members of the Juken Club!
- Air Gear
  - Itsuki Minami needs no introduction – everybody's heard of the "Babyface" of the Eastside. He's the toughest kid at Higashi Junior High School, easy on the eyes but dangerously tough when he needs to be. Plus, Itsuki lives with the mysterious and sexy Noyamano sisters. Life is never dull, but it becomes dangerous when Itsuki leads his school to victory over some vindictive Westside punks with gangster connections. Now he stands to lose his school, his friends, and everything he cares about. But in his darkest hour, the Noyamano girls come to Itsuki's aid. They can teach him a powerful skill that will save their school from the gangsters’ siege–and introduce Itsuki to a thrilling and terrifying new world.
- Silky Whip
  - Silky Whip is a collection of different hentai short stories; it has a sequel called Silky Whip Extreme. The first Oh! great creation released outside Japan, published by Eros Comix.
- Legend of Himiko
  - Original PSX character design. Himejima Himiko does not know who her parents are. In fact, she cannot remember much about her past at all. She is, in fact, a sacred child from a parallel fantasy realm. At the event of her birth, during a sacred flame ritual, an evil general with sadistic intentions invades the palace, causing the six guardians of the flame to be dispersed, and nearly killing Himiko. Several years later, Himiko and her adoptive brother return to Himiko's homeland, to find it torn apart by war; it is up to Himiko to reunite the six guardians and return order to the realm.
- Majin Devil
  - Majin Devil is the connection of two stories. It begins with a young gang member who is transformed into a monster by the Majin Devil. The second is the story of how one boy genius uses his intellect to defeat the Majin Devil with the help of some allies he meets along the way.
- Naked Star
  - A collection of hentai short stories set in various dystopian futures.
- Burn-Up W and Burn-Up Excess
  - One-shot manga adaptation of these two Burn-Up series.
- Tekken 5
  - Designed Asuka Kazama's third costume (female yakuza/yakuza wife).
  - Designed Yoshimitsu's third costume.
- Tekken 6
  - Designed Lili's third costume (bride outfit).
- Tekken Tag Tournament 2
  - Designed Anna Williams's second costume.
- Soulcalibur IV
  - Designed the bonus character Ashlotte.
- Pen & Ink guide to penning and inking manga
  - Book, with Yasuhiro Nightow and Satoshi Shiki! (2006), published by Digital Manga
- Digimon Story: Cyber Sleuth
  - Designed Eater (Character)
- Bakemonogatari
  - The manga adaptation of the Monogatari novel series
- Kaijin Fugeki: Kindled Spirits (manga)
