= Koyomi Araragi =

Fictional character from Monogatari

- Monogatari character
- Promotional illustration of Koyomi Araragi
- First appearance: Bakemonogatari (2006)
- Created by: Nisio Isin
- Designed by: Vofan
- Voiced by: Hiroshi Kamiya (Japanese); Erik Scott Kimerer (English)

In-universe information
- Family: Unnamed father; Unnamed mother; Karen Araragi (younger sister); Tsukihi Araragi (younger sister); Hitagi Senjougahara (girlfriend)

Koyomi Araragi (Japanese: 阿良々木 暦, Hepburn: Araragi Koyomi) is the protagonist of Nisio Isin's light novel series Monogatari. Araragi is a third-year high school student who became part vampire after sharing his blood with Shinobu Oshino. During the story, Araragi finds himself helping girls involved with a variety of apparitions, ghosts, beasts, spirits, and other supernatural phenomena, which often serve as proxies for their emotional and mental issues. While most of the narrative focuses on his multiple relationships and encounters, the series often centers on his own personal life as it tackles his origins as a vampire, most notably the Kizumonogatari prequel story.

Araragi was written by Nisio Isin as the main narrator of the series who often dealt other female characters in large discussions. However, Isin revised early manuscripts and rewrote Araragi as a better person and developed a relationship with Hitagi Senjougahara as a romantic couple. In the anime television series and film adaptations, Araragi was voiced by Hiroshi Kamiya who found the character hard to emulate as a result of his multiple narrations, monologues and interactions.

Araragi was popular for several years in polls involving characters and relationships. He has been praised for his role in the story as well as his romantic relationship with Senjougahara which remained appealing in the novels despite the large amount of romantic interests the character has. However, he was often criticized for his childish demeanor with younger characters, most notably in Nisemonogatari, which would scare general audiences.

== Creation ==
Sketch of Araragi by Vofan

Araragi appears in the Monogatari light novels by Nisio Isin; the author said that the protagonist was meant to be a "stud" and abandon his desires and lose his propensity for love. However, the novel was re-written in the form of romantic comedy elements with a major focus on Araragi's relationship with his love interest Hitagi Senjougahara. The vampire Shinobu Oshino was kept in secret until Nisemonogatari where she is revealed to his sidekick after several scenes where she remains silent without major activities in the narrative. With the Monogatari novels, Nisio Isin has been delving into one character per story arc by writing their one-on-one conversations with Araragi by each arc. While Araragi is not depicted in the light novels' covers, he was still designed by novel illustrator Vofan. This generated rumors that Araragi was never drawn for the novels until VOFAN corrected this on Twitter by showing his illustration that predated the anime series.

For the anime adaptations of the light novel, Araragi was voiced by Hiroshi Kamiya. The actor's work was divided into three categories: narration, monologue, and dialogue. He divided the text and devoted himself to processing it in a form close to the narration. Frequent switching between monologues and narration mixes objective explanations with the feelings of the Araragi which brought him difficulties. The number of sentences was overwhelmingly large, so if there is a number of words that one person could speak in a day, which led to several problems during recordings of the anime. Kamiya kept reading the novels to understand Araragi's character until the final school novel Owarimonogatari. Director Akiyuki Shinbo found Kamiya useful in the making of the anime adaptation noting he had already read the novels before the premiere. Erik Scott Kimerer narrated and voiced Araragi in the English-language audiobook version of Kizumonogatari, which was released by Bang Zoom! Entertainment on May 25, 2016.

For the manga of the series, the authors said Koyomi's subtle expressions and gestures can convey more complex information. The fact that meaning can be understood without words can be seen as a way of "sharing the atmosphere" with the reader. Nisio Isin made emphasis on how the story often focuses on Araragi's relationship with Hanekawa when interacting with Oh! Great. She is the reason that Koyomi became a vampire, and she is also the mastermind of sorts. On the other hand, Senjougahara, who was freed from the crab, is a so-called wannabe, just like any other high school girl who keeps wishing to be "special," to be the protagonist even if it means tragedy, but in the end she is unable to become that, and is unable to even continue wishing for it. Koyomi, who is in the middle, in the grey zone, is the one who is the one between the two. Oh! Great also wanted to explore more the relationship between Koyomi and Shinobu in the manga as Bakemonogatari barely addresses their origin.

=== Portrayal in Kizumonogatari ===
In regards to his prequel persona from Kizumonogatari, Araragi was portrayed to act more immature when interacting with others. His relationships with his mentor Meme Oshino, his first love interest Tsubasa Hanekawa and Shinobu's original vampire persona, Kiss-Shot, were written to have a major impact on his life. This would eventually result in Araragi developing into the more social teenager from Bakemonogatari. Director Shinbo wanted to learn why Araragi chose Senjougahara over Hanekawa since Araragi was also attracted to the latter in the prequel. Two subsequent stories, Nekomonogatari Black and Nekomonogatari White, serve as the major focus involving Araragi and Hanekawa's relationship which pleased Shinbo, believing he understood Nisio Isin's feelings in such novel. Araragi concludes that his feelings for Hanekawa were not romantic. Araragi's relationship with Hanekawa was written to be predecessor of the story arc "Tsubasa Cat, Part 6". Originally, the idea of the film was portraying the duo as friends but as the film was developed, Oishi found their relationship love provoking. Fellow director Tatsuya Oishi enjoyed the focus on Araragi and wanted his scenes with Kiss-Shot to be fulfilling in Kizumonogatari. The puberty jokes about Araragi wanting to touch Hanekawa's cleavage to prepare for his battle with Kiss-Shot were specifically made to make the audience feel uncomfortable and make sure it retains the comedy that the franchise is known for. Araragi's more degenerate persona was symbolized by how his hair covers the other half of his face compared to the TV series.

For the final fight between Araragi and Kiss-Shot, staff members at studio Shaft wanted to stay away from Isin's commentary as a torture in every move and instead animate a black comedy as a result of the several gruesome sequences. Oishi also wanted to emphasize Araragi's burst of rage when Hanekawa is severely wounded in the second film from the trilogy. In developing the protagonist, the staff came into thinking of it as a story about how Araragi has his set of values and ethics that he has spent 17 years building up completely overturned. As a result, he comes to realize the hypocrisy of his actions in saving someone out of pity and becomes another victim.

Kamiya was looking forward to voicing Araragi in Kizumonogatari for several years due to delays of the films. However, he was disappointed due to the more quiet atmosphere the film was given. He had already read the novel and wanted to repeat the same monologues. In contrast to the TV series, Kizumonogatari has no monologues, so it was essential for Kamiya to understand Araragi's inner thoughts as well as the subtle emotions behind his eye movements and breathing patterns. He was heavily supported by Shinbo while working in the film. During the scene in Tekketsu when Araragi first encounters Kissshot and tells her to take his blood, his state of mind was fluctuating rapidly. Although his internal turmoil was spelled out in the novel, the film had to continue without pausing. Being eleven years older during the recording when compared to his debut, Kamiya said the character of Araragi would be missing a sense of freshness because his acting chops have improved over time. There are many scenes where the underlying emotions do not match the superficial actions; there are parts where he would not understand how his character is feeling from the art alone. Kamiya had trouble deciding whether to convey what the animation showed or what Araragi truly felt in those moments. It was hard to determine which emotions to reflect in his voice. He knew Araragi would be misunderstood even if the audience picked up on all the nuances in the art. Kamiya had to think about how to create these clues while deciding whether to create them at all, which was a lot of work. However, recordings with Owarimonogatari helped Kamiya understand several parts from Araragi's mental state.

== Appearances ==
Araragi is the protagonist of the Monogatari light novel series. He is a third-year high school student who fails every subject except mathematics. The series starts with Bakemonogatari where he meet his antagonistic classmate Hitagi Senjougahara after saving her from falling to the stairs. Despite Senjougahara's threats, Araragi notices she has several problems. He offers his help, revealing his own secret of being part vampire in the process. Once Araragi helps solve Senjougahara's problem, she becomes friendlier with him, talking to him several times until she confesses she is in love with him. As Araragi responds to her feelings, the two start dating and he often asks her with help with studying. Although Araragi initially has dates with Senjougahara, Araragi requests her girlfriend's aid into improving his academics as he had poor interests into school before meeting her. The prequel novel Kizumonogatari later reveals that after being attacked by a vampire during spring break and becoming a vampire himself, specialist Meme Oshino helps him become human again, though Araragi retains several lingering side effects and vampiric powers such as enhanced regenerative abilities. Araragi occasionally visits Oshino in order to get rid of Apparitions following innocent people, which often result in Araragi sacrificing himself for their sake as he is unwilling to hurt others.

The prequel novel Kizumonogatari portrays Araragi as a lonely student who only befriends Tsubasa Hanekawa despite his reluctance to form bonds. Araragi then encounters Shinobu for the first time as "Kiss-Shot Acerola-Orion Heart-Under-Blade". Kiss-Shot asks Araragi to give her his blood in order to save her life, and when he does, Araragi finds himself reborn as her vampire subordinate. He then asks Kiss-Shot how he can revert himself and she answers that he has to find all of her limbs that were cut by her killers. Araragi and Oshino succeed at fully restoring Kiss-Shot. Despite lacking skills as a martial artist, Araragi's new body strengthened by Kiss-Shot allows him to easily defeat the other vampires hunting his master. Kiss-Shot admits that she was going to throw the fight, and explains that she has to die to restore a subordinate's humanity, but could not do so for her previous subordinate because she was too scared of death. Oshino proposes a solution that will "make everyone miserable": Araragi will suck out Kiss-Shot's blood only to the point that she is too weak to hunt humans, leaving them both quasi-versions of vampire and human. The prequel Nekomonogatari has Araragi confused about his feelings for Hanekawa before the beginning of Bakemonogatari with his sisters believing he is only sexually frustrated. Eventually, when learning of an Apparitions Hanekawa has, Araragi realizes he does not love Hanekawa and instead just wants to help her in a heroic complex.

In the novel Owarimonogatari, Araragi reflects on his school life and how he started being hated by a classmate, Sodachi Oikura, who used to teach him mathematics. With Hanekawa's aid, Araragi confronts Oikura and, after learning of her poor upbringing, he tells her to hate him if it helps her reach happiness. After solving this issue, Araragi realizes he also an alter-ego who judges him in the form of young student, Ōgi Oshino. Eventually, Araragi starts making peace with his hero complex and graduates from high school alongside Hanekawa and Senjougahara. Following his graduation, Araragi enters into a university but keeps helping others. He ends up marrying his girlfriend in his adult life. After graduating from university, Araragi follows his parents' footsteps and becomes a police officer. He worked in the rumour squad under Tsuzura Kouga, a department created by Izuko Gaen to deal with supernatural oddities. Most of his co-workers in the department are also involved with oddities in their life.

== Reception ==
Koyomi Araragi has been a popular character. In Takarajimasha's Kono Light Novel ga Sugoi! guide book, he ranked sixth in the "Best Male Character" in 2009, second in 2010, seventh in 2011, third in 2012, and sixth in 2013. In the Newtype Anime Awards from 2014 and 2016, Araragi took ninth and fourth place in male character category, respectively. In Charapedia polls, his relationship with Senjougahara stood out as one of the best couples in anime. Newtype magazine named him the 18th best anime male character of the 2000s.

Critical response to Araragi's character in the first story arcs were mixed. THEM Anime Reviews praised Araragi's relationship with all the characters he helps to solve a problem, comparing the protagonist with Kyon from the Haruhi Suzumiya series. He further enjoyed how Araragi also has own personal issues to deal with when there are no girls in need to. However, he found Araragi's romantic relationship with Senjougahara unlikable at times due to the poor manners of Senjougahara. Comic Book Resources noted how Araragi stands out thanks to the chemistry he develops with other characters despite the story coming across as a harem. While finding the main couple appealing, Rice Digital lamented how Senjougahara is not present in most episodes, leaving the reviewer with the desire to develop them more. While enjoying the conflicts between Araragi and Mayoi in the first series, Anime News Network found their interactions in the light novel tiring as their interactions are longer. Although the interactions between Araragi and the rest to be the main selling point of the series, Comic Book Resources was against Suruga Kanbaru being portrayed lesbian, and claimed that women needing to be saved by a male did not age well years after the novels' release.

In a further analysis of the series, Anime News Network criticized Araragi's relationship with his sisters, Karen and Tsukihi, which come across as "creepy and wrong". The writer further highlights an infamous scene from Nisemonogatari where Araragi uses a toothbrush on Karen's teeth, which is portrayed in "excruciating detail, framed romantically, overtly sexually, with groaning noises". This incest-like moment was noted as a potential turn-off for casual viewers. Despite Araragi's lust for women, Anime News Network noted that the protagonist remains loyal to Senjougahara. Among other story arcs, Anime News Network commented that Araragi's heroic complex is developed deeply. The explanation of Araragi's and Shinobu's relationship in the second season led to further praise by THEM Anime Reviews but the writer had mixed feelings in regards to his screentime with Hanekawa as there was also potential for the two being a potential couple.

Barbara Greene from Tokyo International University said Araragi is an "otaku self-insert character", who find a multi-layered combination of the narrative of the real to be fulfilling, Araragi elects to retain this connection to the supernatural despite the hardships it can cause. This decision draws him towards an array of moe characters who give him greater access to the supernatural world in the universe of Bakemonogatari. Even among Araragi's harem of possessed schoolgirls, there are only two who possess "real world" counterparts—Senjougahara and Hanekawa. In general, Comic Book Resources said that out of several events in the franchise, Araragi deciding to stay as a vampire does not make sense as he will remain young forever and outlive Senjougahara.

The character's origins in Kizumonogatari were praised by Anime News Network for exploring his first meeting with Hanekawa and transformation into a vampire with the film using less words than the TV series to convey emotions. His fights were praised for how violent they are while adding sacrifice for everything he does in the story despite criticizing the obsession with the female body. Otaku USA praised the fastpaced fight sequences for how appealing they make Araragi in the films when compared to the TV series while further exploring his first meetings with Hanekawa. University of Valle commented that Araragi's design is noteworthy for often changing between costumes which are considered fashionable in Japan in contrast to Hanekawa and Kiss-Shot who always wear the same outfit. While Araragi is generally calm when interacting with Kiss-Shot, the film's creators take advantage of his crush with Hanekawa in order to provide comic relief that contrasts the serious narrative; While Araragi is consistently portrayed as a calm person, Hanekawa is instead portrayed as the one constantly getting into the protagonist's personal space, which leads to the two becoming friendly in the process. Diponegoro University said the interactions between Araragi and Hanekawa were easier to understand to Japanese users due to hidden messages in some of the former's words which include dajare which contradicts the protagonist's attempts of being antisocial. Manga author Tatsuki Fujimoto said he was a fan of Kizumonogatari and its protagonists which inspired the final fight between Denji and Makima in Chainsaw Man.

Game Rant described Araragi as a "a flawed but complex protagonist around whom a lot of equally complex characters appeared". Owarimonogatari managed to properly end his arc through his high school graduation as he kept saving other people from their own traumas. This led to several fourth wall breaking jokes in later novels where the protagonist continues insisting his story ended despite already given written an adult as he encounters new people in need to be saved.
