= Katsushi Ōta =

Japanese editor (born 1972)

- 太田 克史
- Born: March 22, 1972 (age 54); Kurashiki, Okayama Prefecture, Japan
- Other name: J
- Education: Waseda University
- Occupation: Magazine editor
- Years active: 1995-present

Katsushi Ōta (太田 克史, Ōta Katsushi; born March 22, 1972) is a Japanese editor. As of 2020, he is president of Seikaisha, a publishing company established as a wholly owned subsidiary of Kodansha.

== Career ==
Ōta was born in Kurashiki, Okayama Prefecture and graduated from the department of Japanese literature in the faculty of education at Waseda University. He joined Kodansha in 1995 and was assigned to the editorial department of Bessatsu Friend, and in 1998 was transferred to the Literary Book Publishing Department No. 3 of the Literary Bureau. He was mainly in charge of Kodansha Novels and young novelists such as Natsuhiko Kyogoku, Ryūsui Seiryōin, Kouhei Kadono, Ōtarō Maijō, Yuya Sato, Nisio Isin, Kinoko Nasu, and Ryukishi07. He also worked as an editor of the literary magazine Mephisto. His nickname is "J".

In 2003, he received the highest rating in Kodansha's internal contest and became the youngest editor in the history of Kodansha. He launched the literary magazine Faust as a one-man editorial team. For a long time, he was a member of Kodansha's Literary Book Publishing Department No. 3, but in October 2006, he was transferred to the newly established Kodansha's International Literature Publishing Department, and launched the Kodansha Box line in November 2006. He served as Kodansha Box's editor-in-chief with the goal of it becoming the general label for novels, manga, and nonfiction, though he continued to serve as editor-in-chief of Faust at the same time.

In December 2008, he was transferred from Kodansha Box as editor-in-chief (head of the department) and became senior manager of Kodansha's Literary Bureau, which was attached to Kodansha Box. It was commented that this was "necessary to take Kodansha Box to the next level."

In 2010, he was appointed vice president of Seikaisha, a new company established independent of Kodansha Box, which came under the jurisdiction of the Literary Bureau, and was merged with Literary Book Publishing Department No. 3. All the main writers except Nisio Isin, Ōtarō Maijō, and Ryūsui Seiryōin joined the company, with replacements such as Yūri Shibamura, while his role as editor-in-chief for Faust remained unchanged. In 2020, he became president and CEO of Seikaisha.
