= Kodansha Box =

Japanese publishing imprint

Kodansha Box (講談社BOX, Kōdansha BOX) is the name of a book label published since November 2006 and a division of the major Japanese publishing house, Kodansha. The label published not only novels but also manga and critical review books, advocating a "hybrid label." The label was originally characterized by its silver boxed binding, but since November 2010, it has been publishing the "Powers BOX" label, dedicated to Kodansha BOX Newcomer Award "Powers" award-winning works, in a different binding in parallel, and in its final years, it mainly published books in softcover.

From its inception, the label sponsored the Kodansha Box Newcomer Award, and actively introduced new authors and illustrators to the world. It also published the magazine Pandora from 2008 to 2009 and the electronic magazine BOX-AiR from February 2011. Editor Katsushi Ōta described the label as: "A collection of works on the theme of adolescent self-consciousness. I hope it becomes an index of Japanese popular culture."

== Overview ==
Kodansha Box launched as a special exception, as Katsushi Ōta, the editor-in-chief of the literary magazine Faust and a member of Kodansha's Literary Book Publishing Department No. 3, was transferred to the newly established Overseas Literature Publishing Department in October 2006. The label's slogan is "Everything is boxed, KODANSHA BOX. It is you who will open it."

Ōta, who was the first department head, stepped down in December 2008 and established Seikaisha. Instead, Naoki Akimoto, who had been in charge of Soji Shimada, Kenji Takemoto, Yukito Ayatsuji, and Yutaka Maya at Kodansha Novels, became the second department head (from December 2008). Later, it was reported in the official e-mail magazine in March 2011 that "P" became the third head of the department. Tatsunobu Satō, a.k.a. "P," later served as editor-in-chief of Gunzo from 2016 to 2019.

The label published novels, manga, and critiques in a unified "silver box" format, but also published "Kodansha Box Pieces" that were not in a box, and in its final years, the color and shape of the boxes was changed for each book, and many were published in soft covers. It also sponsored the Kodansha BOX Newcomer Award from its inception, and from 2008 to 2009 also published the magazine Pandora as a branch from Faust. The number of books published reached 100 with Seiji Kagami's Shiro no Danshō in May 2009, but this counts only the books published in the silver box.

In the early and middle years of the label's history, it also conducted a number of special projects without regard to profitability. These included Hiroki Azuma's Zero Academy Dojo (March 2008–August 2009), in which new critics were selected and trained to make their debut, Daisuke Nishijima's Inspirational☆Manga School (July 2009–), in which all 16 participants aimed to debut as manga artists, and KOBOCAFE (May–August 2008), which created a place for creators and readers to gather. For a time, an official corner was also set up within amazon.co.jp, where interviews with authors could be read, and reviews by actress Mikako Tabe and voice actress Mai Nakahara were posted, among other proactive PR efforts.

Ōta stated that the Kodansha Box editorial department under him was gradually developing "a kind of culture unique to the department," since the offices were located in the new Kodansha Annex 1, which was built in 2007 and was adjacent to the main building, but in a different location. No other book-based editorial department at Kodansha had a place where writers come to visit the editorial department every day, and he was proud of that.

In 2010, Ōta, who had left Kodansha Box's planning and editing division in 2008, launched a new company, Seikaisha, and became vice president. As a result, the main writers other than Nisio Isin left the label. All of the above special projects were retooled and Pandora ceased publication. The number of publications also declined due to a lack of editorial staff and writers. The launch of Kodansha Box was based on the success of Faust, first published in 2003, but the literary movement of the 00s' fusion of light novels, genre novels, and literature subsided, and no star authors emerged to follow Nisio Isin, Ōtarō Maijō, Yuya Sato, Kinoko Nasu, etc. The movement had been stalling since around 2009, and the label split between Kodansha Box and Seikaisha was the decisive factor in the decline. In August 2015, with the launch of the new Kodansha Taiga label, it became public knowledge that the authors had been reorganized, and after Pandora ceased publication, the electronic magazine BOX-AiR, which was launched with the participation of King Records, also ended publication with its 52nd issue in July 2015.

Since then, the Kodansha Box name has remained as a publication label for Nisio Isin's Monogatari series, Bōkyaku Tantei series, and novelizations, but no other series have been published.

In March 2020, the official website of the label was shut down.

== Contributors ==
- Nisio Isin
- Ryūsui Seiryōin
- Kinoko Nasu
- Ōtarō Maijō
- Ryukishi07

== Published titles ==
=== D ===
Title	Author	Illustrator	No. of volumes
Devil Survivor 2 The Animation: Kujiraza no purikueru	Katsumi Amagawa	N/A	1

=== H ===
Title	Author	Illustrator	No. of volumes
Higurashi no Naku Koro ni	Ryukishi07	Tomohi	17

=== K ===
Title	Author	Illustrator	No. of volumes
Katanagatari	Nisio Isin	Take	12 + 1 side story

=== M ===
Title	Author	Illustrator	No. of volumes
Monogatari Series	Nisio Isin	Vofan	26

=== U ===
Title	Author	Illustrator	No. of volumes
Umineko no Naku Koro ni	Ryukishi07	Tomohi	15
