= The Sky Crawlers: Innocent Aces =

2008 video game

- Developers: Project Aces; Access Games
- Publishers: Namco Bandai Games; NA: Xseed Games
- Director: Nobuo Tomita
- Producers: Kuniaki Kakuwa; Shigeru Yoshida
- Programmers: Hitoshi Ueda; Satoshi Suzuki
- Artist: Taichi Wada
- Writers: Yuta Hamanaka; Yutaka Toyama; Yosuke Kano
- Composer: Kazuhiro Nakamura
- Platform: Wii
- Release: JP: October 16, 2008; NA: January 12, 2010; EU: February 26, 2010; AU: March 25, 2010
- Genre: Air combat simulation
- Modes: Single-player, multiplayer

The Sky Crawlers: Innocent Aces (Note: Japanese: スカイ・クロラ イノセン・テイセス, Hepburn: Sukai Kurora: Inosen Teisesu) is a 2008 air combat arcade game for the Wii based on the anime film adaptation of Hiroshi Mori’s novel series The Sky Crawlers, as a tie-in prequel to the film. Developed by Project Aces in collaboration with Access Games, the game was released in Japan by Namco Bandai Games on 16 October 2008. Xseed Games released the game in North America on January 12, 2010. It was also released by Namco Bandai Games in Europe on February 26, 2010 and in Australia on March 25, 2010.

== Gameplay ==
Unlike most Wii games where the Wii Remote is held in the dominant hand, Sky Crawlers is played by holding the Nunchuk with that hand instead, while the Wii Remote is held in the other hand, for a HOTAS setup that designates the former as the flight control stick and the latter as the throttle lever. Using the motion detection of both controllers, movement of the Nunchuk is used to tilt, roll, pitch and yaw the player's aircraft, while the Wii Remote is used as the throttle, with players tilting it up and down to accelerate and decelerate. The game also supports the Classic Controller and GameCube controller for more traditional control.

The game introduces a gameplay mechanic called the "Tactical Maneuver Command" system, in which players gain the ability to perform automatic acrobatics to better position themselves for attack by keeping in close proximity to their enemies. During the game, players unlock new planes, which they can customize in seven areas, such as color, weapons and armor, obtained from defeating special enemies and doing well in missions. Players can also replay previous missions that they have beaten. A second player can also join in co-op mode to provide supporting fire with just an additional Wii Remote.

== Plot ==
=== Story ===
Set in an alternate history, the game follows the journeys and tribulations of a group of young fighter pilots involved in aerial dogfighting using World War II-esque propeller-driven fighter planes. Although the world is at peace, in order to ease the tension of a populace accustomed to war and aggression, private corporations contract fighter pilots to stage combat operations against each other for show across the skies of central Europe, with various place names in Japanese.

In the game players control Lynx, a rookie pilot who joins a team of privately contracted pilots, the Sky Crawlers. The first mission, he joins the Rostock ace air force team, the Cougar Squad, which includes Captain Mutsuga Yamazaki and the hot-blooded Masami Kaida. The squad is managed by Colonel Kayaba. The first mission involves destroying enemy jamming aircraft in a war with rival corporation Lautern. Following the success of this mission, Cougar Squad is deployed to Ubasama, to rendezvous with new additions to the Squad, revealed to be kildren, artificial human clones who stay young indefinitely and are immune to everything except violence. Among these new recruits are Maumi Orishina, a female kildren who later becomes obsessed with fighting Lynx, and Ko Ukumori, an elitist pilot who has strong views on the strong and the weak. Soon after this, Cougar Squad is sent to Kiriki, to defend the production site of a new flying battleship, Wolfram. Several Cougar Squad pilots are killed in this operation, including at least two Kildren who are re-cloned under new names. Captain Yamasaki sacrifices himself to defend Ukumori from an unexpected Lautern attack over the Yaura river later on in a battle coordinated with other Rostock bases. Then Lynx is made Captain of Cougar Squad, renamed Cheetah Squad, by Tochika Mozume, Rostock's Deputy Chief of Intelligence, while Kayaba is reassigned to another base.

Shortly after this reorganization, Mozume sets up a mock battle between Lynx and Orishina to test a new aircraft that is interrupted by enemy forces, frustrating the latter. After several operations, including destroying unauthorized Lautern power plants previously discovered in a nearly botched recon mission in the Baruka Mountains and destroying Lautern's prized Glacier Fleet, an operation to destroy Fortress Shikibo goes disastrously wrong when Lautern's Amoebic Rail Cannon, which was said to be non-operational, downs several Rostock pilots, including two Cheetah squad pilots. Ukumori insults these pilots, including Captain Yamazaki, enraging Kaida into attacking him. Mozume then orders Cheetah to destroy Kaida, who harbors no ill will towards Cheetah, but Mozume bars the combat-eager Orishina from assisting Cheetah. Soon after, she goes absent without leave, and turns out to have defected to Lautern under Mozume's suggestion, after he sees high interest in a confrontation between her and Cheetah.

Not long after the squadron successfully defends the Wolfram from a desperate Lautern attack, Kayaba warns Cheetah that he has discovered Mozume carrying out a revolt against Rostock, seizing Wolfram and persuading Ukumori and two other kildren to defect to Lautern. Cheetah then shoots down the three defectors in a fierce battle over Ubasama, then proceeds to Kiriki to battle the Wolfram, under Mozume's control. While aboard the battleship, an increasingly deranged Mozume reveals that he has a personal agenda to destroy both Rostock and Lautern and create his own new world, dissatisfied with the "lies" that fuel the war. Cheetah then destroys Wolfram, forcing its crew to evacuate as it crashes down to earth, but they abandon Mozume to die on the ship, who then spends his last breath cursing Cheetah just as Wolfram explodes. Following the destruction of Wolfram, Kayaba commands the squadron to engage in one final air battle over Karasu Bay, where the seemingly abandoned Lautern fortress Togakuten sits on a small island in the middle of the water. Cheetah easily shoots down many enemy planes, before they all flee to make way for new Lautern ace Orishina, whom he engages in a decisive one-on-one duel that is disrupted midway by the fortress' anti-aircraft guns unexpectedly coming online. Cheetah eventually defeats Orishina, who dies satisfied that she got a fight with him despite losing it. The final cutscene has an unnamed female Kildren, believed to be Kusanagi from the movie, arrive at the base, referring to Cheetah as Teacher.

=== Characters ===
==== Lynx/Cheetah ====
The main character of the game. His face is never shown nor does he ever talk. It appears Lynx is his callsign, as the squad chooses to use them during missions. Lynx's name is changed to Cheetah by his squad mates after he takes over as captain. Cheetah is considered a superior and quite feared ace by the enemy, nicknamed the Black Cat because of the black cat painted on the back of the planes he rides. At the end of the game, Cheetah is called Teacher, suggesting that he is the character of the same name from the film.

==== Maumi Orishina ====
She is the only girl in the Cougar Squad, later renamed the Cheetah Squad after Lynx is made captain and renamed Cheetah. She is a Kildren, cloned children who never age to be used as soldiers, and she loves to fly more than anything else. After a mock battle to test new planes against Cheetah, Maumi becomes obsessed with fighting Cheetah to have the ultimate aerial battle she desires. She takes this to the point of even defecting to Lautern to force Cheetah to fight her in a final duel. In the end, Cheetah is forced to shoot her down, but she is seen at the end of the game. Whether she is the same Maumi or a clone of her is unknown, but she respects Cheetah as her superior and calls him Teacher, implying she could be the film character Suito Kusanagi after her death in the game.

==== Kō Ukumori ====
Ukumori is a white haired Kildren, codenamed Sprite, that believes in strength alone. He commonly looks down on the fallen, suggesting they were weak, much to the anger of others. Ukumori sees himself as the best of everyone, and commonly makes challenges to others, verbally insulting their skills as well. At the end, Ukumori defects with Mozume in the idea with Rostock's successes, victory had to be given to Lautern to balance the war. As he battles Cheetah. He shows a severe jealous streak of Cheetah, claiming all his fame and recognition should be his instead. However, he is killed when Cheetah shoots him down. It was unknown if Ukumori was recloned afterwards.

==== Masami Kaida ====
A serious and often made fun of member of the Cougar/Cheetah Squad who idolized Captain Yamazaki. He apparently shares a second in command role with Ukumori after Cheetah is promoted to captain. Kaida often is at ends with Ukumori, disliking his attitude about the fallen. Eventually, Ukumori pushes Kaida too far after two of their squadmates are killed and he insults not only them, but the fallen Captain Yamazaki once more. Kaida attacks Ukumori, intending to shoot him down, making Mozume order Cheetah to shoot him down. Cheetah is forced to shoot down his friend, but Kaida shows no hatred as he falls. He just says goodbye to his old friend with a smile before dying in the explosion.

==== Mutsuga Yamasaki ====
The serious and hard-nosed leader of the Cougar Squad. He continually tells his squadmates about their shortcomings to keep them improving, and cares about the safety of them. Yamasaki is killed when he shields Ukumori's plane from gunfire; ironically, Ukumori continues to insult Yamasaki throughout the game even though his sacrifice saved his life. After Yamasaki is killed in action, Lynx is promoted to captain and renamed Cheetah, thus renaming the squad the Cheetah Squad.

==== Tochika Mozume ====
The Deputy Chief in charge of Rostock's operations and the antagonist of the game, apparently being also one of people involved in the introduction of Kildren. He takes full command after Yamazaki's death, promoting Lynx/Cheetah to captain. Mozume acts like he cares about the well-being of his pilots, but in truth, he is a manipulative opportunist who seeks to gain power for himself. Mozume is the one who manipulates Maumi to defect, though not explaining why (it may have been he wanted her to get rid of Cheetah who he started seeing as a threat). He is also the one who makes the Kildren, aside from Hiroto and Niya, defect against Rostock, stealing Wolfram, a gigantic battleship, for Lautern. As you battle the Wolfram, Mozume reveals his true nature, declaring that he will remake a new world when he gains the power he needs. It was suggested Mozume would eventually turn on Lautern when he got what he wanted from them. In the end, Mozume's plans are brought to end by Cheetah when the ace pilot destroys Wolfram's chimneys, causing an internal fire that damages it from inside, as well as its powerful cannons. As the Wolfram is falling, Mozume's madness makes his own men abandon him to die. Mozume states that Cheetah will one day succumb to old age and that his battles will be for naught. Before the Wolfram crashes and kills its mad creator, Mozume curses the world, most likely Cheetah most of all.

==== Miscellaneous ====
- Colonel Kayaba: An esteemed colonel of Rostock who manages Cougar Squadron and makes every effort to stay at Hariyu Base. He provides the briefing for the first and last several missions of the main campaign, and has expressed suspicion and concern for Mozume's agenda. After Yamasaki's death, Mozume reassigns Kayaba to another base, giving him false assurance that the squadron would manage well in his absence. After the Wolfram is secured, Kayaba warns Cheetah of Mozume's evil plan taking shape and urges him to take immediate action to stop it.
- Major Ushio: An aide to Mozume who also briefs in certain missions in the middle of the campaign while Kayaba is away. He is easily manipulated, and is implied to be aboard a gunboat nearby where Cheetah's battle with Wolfram ended, which the player can destroy as a special enemy to unlock a new upgrade part.
- Hiroto: One of the few kildren who remained loyal to Rostock. He is killed when the Wolfram shoots him down with a spotlight-aimed cannon.

== Development and release ==
The game features full-motion videos in between missions animated by Production I.G, who also animated the 2008 film. The film's director Mamoru Oshii was a special consultant along with author Hiroshi Mori, and both played and tested a pre-release version of the game. In designing Innocent Aces, the development team incorporated various gameplay elements from its signature Ace Combat video game series, which had never seen a release on the Wii, let alone a Nintendo home console. (Note: The first Ace Combat game released on a Nintendo home console would eventually be a Nintendo Switch port of Ace Combat 7: Skies Unknown, released on July 11, 2024.)

In localizing the game for North America, XSeed Games decided to directly translate the game's script from Japanese, utilizing occasional common English phrases and expressions wherever appropriate. The localization team also contemplated the possibility of leaving in an option for Japanese voices, but this was removed from the final product.

Innocent Aces was first released in Japan on October 16, 2008, shortly after the Sky Crawlers film's theatrical run. The North American localization was originally planned to release during the 2009 holiday season, before being delayed to a January 2010 release, with releases in PAL regions following afterward.

== Reception ==
British magazine NGamer gave the Japanese version of the game 88%. Nintendo Power gave the game a 7 out of 10. IGN gave the game an 8.0. Hardcore Gamer Magazine awarded the game a 3.5/5 stating that players will likely enjoy the story and that "you will feel like a badass pilot as you mow down planes and bomb ground units". James Jones of Nintendo World Report gave the game's strongest praise with a score of 9 out of 10, admiring the graphics, audio and controls, while criticizing the lack of a competitive splitscreen multiplayer option.

The game's unique HOTAS control system was not without its critics. Brett Todd of GameSpot found the default controls unwieldy and recommended the pad controls, scoring the game a 7.5 out of 10. The Australian video game talk show Good Game's two reviewers, however, gave the game a more negative review with a score of a 3.5/10 and 4/10, contending that the game was more problematic beyond its non-traditional controls.

== Manga adaptation ==
A manga series based on the game and illustrated by Yūho Ueji was serialized in the monthly magazine Monthly Comic Blade from November 2008 and collected into two volumes.
