= Yuya Sato =

Yuya Sato may refer to:

- Yuya Sato (footballer) (佐藤 優也, born 1986), Japanese footballer
- Yuya Sato (novelist) (佐藤 友哉, born 1980), Japanese writer
