= The Sky Crawlers =

2001 novel by Hiroshi Mori

- The cover of The Sky Crawlers novel.

スカイ·クロラ (Sukai Kurora)
- Genre: Drama, Philosophy
- Novel series
- Written by: Hiroshi Mori
- Illustrated by: Kenji Tsuruta
- Published by: Chuokoron-Shinsha
- English publisher: The BBB: Breakthrough Bandwagon Books (digital)
- Original run: June 2001 – June 2008
- Volumes: 6
- Anime film
- Directed by: Mamoru Oshii
- Produced by: Tomohiko Ishii
- Written by: Chihiro Itō
- Music by: Kenji Kawai
- Studio: Production I.G
- Licensed by: NA: Sony Pictures Home Entertainment; UK: Manga Entertainment
- Released: August 2, 2008
- Runtime: 121 minutes
- Video game

The Sky Crawlers: Innocent Aces
- Developer: Namco (Project ACES)
- Publisher: Namco Bandai Games
- Genre: Flight simulator
- Platform: Wii
- Released: JP: October 16, 2008; NA: January 12, 2010; EU: February 26, 2010
- Manga

The Sky Crawlers: Innocent Aces
- Written by: Yūho Ueji
- Published by: Mag Garden
- Magazine: Monthly Comic Blade
- Original run: November 2008 – 2009
- Volumes: 2

The Sky Crawlers (スカイ·クロラ, Sukai Kurora) is a Japanese novel series by Hiroshi Mori. First published by Chuōkōron-shinsha in June 2001 and spanning six books, it follows the journeys and tribulations of a group of young fighter pilots involved in dogfight warfare, and is set during an alternate historical period. The series is unlike other works by Mori, noted for his series of mystery novels. The series is illustrated by manga artist Kenji Tsuruta. The series was adapted into an animated film, a video game and a manga series.

== Publishing history ==
The first book written and published, but meant to be the last in the series, was The Sky Crawlers, first released in June 2001. A shinshobon (refurbished) edition of the book followed in October 2002, while the bunkobon (paper back) edition followed in October 2004.

The second, but chronologically first, book in the series, None But Air (ナ·バ·テア, Na Ba Tea), was released in June 2004, while the shinshobon edition for this volume followed in October 2004 and the bunkobon edition followed in November 2005. The third book in the series, Down to Heaven (ダウン·ツ·ヘヴン, Daun Tsu Hevun), followed in June 2005, while its shinshobon edition followed in December 2005 and its bunkobon edition followed in November 2006.

The fourth book in the series, Flutter into Life (フラッタ·リンツ·ライフ, Furatta Rintsu Raifu), followed in June 2006. The fifth book in the series, Cradle the Sky (クレィドゥ·ザ·スカイ, Kureidu Za Sukai), was released in June 2007, while the sixth book, Sky Eclipse (スカイ·イクリプス, Sukai Ikuripusu), a short story collection, was released in June 2008.

The misplaced publishing order was intended to show there is no need to read the story in the chronological order.

== Volumes ==
=== Tankōbon ===
Published by Chuokoron-Shinsha.

- The Sky Crawlers (スカイ·クロラ; 2001, ISBN 4-12-003158-6)
- None But Air (ナ·バ·テア; 2004, ISBN 4-12-003541-7)
- Down to Heaven (ダウン·ツ·ヘヴン; 2005, ISBN 4-12-003644-8)
- Flutter into Life (フラッタ·リンツ·ライフ; 2006, ISBN 4-12-003739-8)
- Cradle the Sky (クレィドゥ·ザ·スカイ; 2007, ISBN 4-12-003840-8)
- Sky Eclipse (スカイ·イクリプス; 2008, ISBN 4-12-003944-7)

=== Novels ===
Published by C Novels, a Chuokoron-Shinsha imprint.

- The Sky Crawlers (スカイ·クロラ; 2002, ISBN 4-12-500781-0)
- None But Air (ナ·バ·テア; 2004, ISBN 4-12-500871-X)
- Down to Heaven (ダウン·ツ·ヘヴン; 2005, ISBN 4-12-500921-X)
- Flutter into Life (フラッタ·リンツ·ライフ; 2007, ISBN 4-12-500986-4)
- Cradle the Sky (クレィドゥ·ザ·スカイ; 2007, ISBN 4-12-501003-X)
- Sky Eclipse (スカイ·イクリプス; 2008, ISBN 4-12-501057-9)

=== Bunko ===
Published by Chūkō Bunko, a Chuokoron-Shinsha imprint.

- The Sky Crawlers (スカイ·クロラ; 2004, ISBN 4-12-204428-6)
- None But Air (ナ·バ·テア; 2005, ISBN 4-12-204609-2)
- Down to Heaven (ダウン·ツ·ヘヴン; 2006, ISBN 4-12-204769-2)
- Flutter into Life (フラッタ·リンツ·ライフ; 2007, ISBN 4-12-204936-9)
- Cradle the Sky (クレィドゥ·ザ·スカイ; 2008, ISBN 4-12-205015-4)
- Sky Eclipse (スカイ·イクリプス; 2009, ISBN 4-12-205117-7)

=== English translation ===
The series was released digitally in English from 2016 to 2022 by The BBB: Breakthrough Bandwagon Books, translated by Ryūsui Seiryōin.

- The Sky Crawlers
  - The Sky Crawlers: Prologue, Episode 1 (June 29, 2016)
  - The Sky Crawlers: Episode 2, Episode 3 (October 30, 2016)
  - The Sky Crawlers: Episode 4, Episode 5, Epilogue (February 28, 2017)
- None But Air
  - None But Air: Prologue, Episode 1 (June 29, 2017)
  - None But Air: Episode 2, Episode 3 (October 29, 2017)
  - None But Air: Episode 4, Epilogue (February 28, 2018)
- Down to Heaven
  - Down to Heaven: Prologue, Episode 1 (June 28, 2018)
  - Down to Heaven: Episode 2, Episode 3 (November 5, 2019)
  - Down to Heaven: Episode 4, Epilogue (March 2, 2019)
- Flutter Into Life
  - Flutter Into Life: Prologue, Episode 1 (June 30, 2019)
  - Flutter Into Life: Episode 2, Episode 3 (October 30, 2019)
  - Flutter Into Life: Episode 4, Epilogue (February 29, 2020)
- Cradle the Sky
  - Cradle the Sky: Prologue, Episode 1 (June 30, 2020)
  - Cradle the Sky: Episode 2, Episode 3 (November 1, 2020)
  - Cradle the Sky: Episode 4, Epilogue (February 28, 2021)
- Sky Eclipse
  - Sky Eclipse: Episodes 1-3 (June 30, 2021)
  - Sky Eclipse: Episodes 4-6 (October 31, 2021)
  - Sky Eclipse: Episodes 7-8 (February 28, 2022)

== Media ==
=== Film ===
The first novel was adapted into an anime film of the same name, directed by Mamoru Oshii, which was released across Japanese theatres by Warner Bros. Japan on August 2, 2008. Animated by Production I.G, the film was written by Chihiro Itō, features character designs by Tetsuya Nishio and music by Kenji Kawai. The series' creator Mori had stated that he felt The Sky Crawlers was the "most difficult" of his works to adapt, and had given his consent to the making of the film after learning of Oshii's involvement as director.

=== Video game ===
A video game, The Sky Crawlers: Innocent Aces, with a plot serving as a prequel to the 2008 film was developed for the Wii by Project Aces, the Namco Bandai team behind the Ace Combat series. It was released in Japan on October 16, 2008. Xseed Games has released the game in North America on January 12, 2010. It was also released by Namco Bandai Games in Europe on February 26, 2010.

=== Manga ===
A manga series, based on the game, titled Sky Crawlers: Innocent Aces and illustrated by Yūho Ueji, was serialized in the monthly magazine Monthly Comic Blade from November 2008 issue and collected into two volumes.
