= Japan Animator Expo =

Series of animated short films

- The logo for Japan Animator Expo feature its stick figure mascot with a face composed of the characters（ーター）

日本アニメ（ーター）見本市 (Nihon Animētā Mihon'ichi)
- Original net animation
- Directed by: Various: Ōtarō Maijō (#1, 25); Azuma Tani (#2); Hibiki Yoshizaki (#3, #20A, #31); Akira Honma (#4); Yoshikazu Yasuhiko (#5); Ichirō Itano (#5); Takeshi Honda (#6); Mahiro Maeda (#6, #13); Tadashi Hiramatsu (#7); Akemi Hayashi (#8); Akira Amemiya (#9); Masahiro Emoto (#10); Takashi Horiuchi (#10); Yasuhiro Yoshiura (#11, #29); Shinji Aramaki (#12, #20B); Hiroyuki Imaishi (#14); Shigeto Koyama (#15); Takanobu Mizuno (#16); Satoru Utsunomiya (#17); Masashi Kawamura (#18); Kazuya Tsurumaki (#19); Ikuto Yamashita (#21); Daisuke Onizuka (#24); Kazuto Nakazawa (#26); Takashi Nakamura (#27); Sayo Yamamoto (#28); Akitoshi Yokoyama (#30); Yūhei Sakuragi (#32); Kazuyoshi Katayama (#33); Hiroyuki Okiura (#34); Hiroyasu Kobayashi (#35)
- Produced by: Various: Tomoyuki Ogata; Kōtarō Horiguchi (#10); Tomohiko Ishii (#12, #20B); Sachie Aihara (#18)
- Written by: Various: Ōtarō Maijō (#1, #25); Hayato Tanaka (#4); Hideaki Anno (#5); Yasuhiro Yoshiura (#11, #29); Shinji Aramaki (#12, #20B); Hiroyuki Imaishi (#14); Hiromi Wakabayashi (#14); Shigeto Koyama (#14); Goichi Suda (#16); Satoru Utsunomiya (#17); Masashi Kawamura (#18); Hajime Ueda (#19); Daisuke Onizuka (#24); Kazuto Nakazawa (#26); Hiroshi Seko (#26); Takashi Nakamura (#27); Akitoshi Yokoyama (#30); Yūhei Sakuragi (#32); Kazuyoshi Katayama (#33); Hiroyuki Okiura (#34); Yōji Enokido (#35)
- Music by: Various: Yoshitaka Koyama (#1, #25); Yasuyuki Sasaki (#2); TeddyLoid (#3,#20A); Daoko (#3, #20A, #31); Junichi Hoshino (#4); Yūshi Matsuyama (#5); Takeo Watanabe (#5); Hiroyasu Yano (#6); Shirō Sagisu (#7, #12, #20B, 22); Avaivartika (#8); Tomisiro (#11, #29); Setsuya Kurotaki (#13); Matt Mirkovich (#14); Eddie Laehecka (#14); Corey Prasek (#14); Kuricorder Quartet (#15); Norihito Ogawa (#16); Yasunori Iwasaki (#17); Yūichi Nakamura (#18); Kenjirō Matsuo (#18); MoNoLith (#21); BuzzG (#32)
- Studio: Various: Studio Khara; Sunrise (#5); Trigger (#9, #11, #14, #29); Graphinica (#10); Studio Rikka (#11, #29); Sola Digital Arts (#12, #20B); Steve N' Steven (#12, #20B, #32); Kamikaze Douga (#16); Dwarf (#18); Studio Colorido (#27); Bridge (#33)
- Released: 7 November 2014 – 9 October 2015
- Episodes: 35

Japan Animator Expo or Japan Anima(tor)'s Exhibition (Japanese: 日本アニメ（ーター）見本市, Hepburn: Nihon Animētā Mihon'ichi) is a weekly series of original net animations released as part of a collaboration between Hideaki Anno's Studio Khara and Dwango, consisting of various anime shorts produced by many directors. The project began release from 7 November 2014 to 9 October 2015 and is streamed worldwide on Niconico.

== Production ==
The project was first announced by Hideaki Anno at the 2014 Tokyo International Film Festival as an effort to offer new animators more exposure to a worldwide audience. The project's logo was designed by Hayao Miyazaki. All characters are voiced by Koichi Yamadera and Megumi Hayashibara. As of December 2018, the website along with all materials and contents related to it have been temporarily closed off to the public. They make mention of reuploading this content at a later date under a new domain.

== Shorts ==
No.	Title	Directed by	Original release date
1	"The Dragon Dentist"; Transliteration: "Ryū no Haisha" (Japanese: 龍の歯医者)	Ōtarō Maijō	7 November 2014
Dragons are strong enough to turn the tide in wars among nations, but they have a single weakness: their teeth. Suppose a dragon's tooth is plagued by strong enough cavities. In that case, the dragon cannot fight, hence why there are dragon dentists who are in charge of keeping the dragon's teeth healthy and free of any additional debris (usually random objects, both big and small, found between teeth). One day, a fallen soldier is found among the debris by a dentist, Nonoko, and his very existence is a foretelling of disastrous events. So the now-revived soldier becomes a dentist-in-training as well, with the help of Nonoko and the other dentists, amidst a war at its climax, and hidden agendas that they are not even aware of.
2	"HILL CLIMB GIRL"	Azuma Tani	14 November 2014
Hinako, a high school girl who loves to ride a bicycle, and respects a professional road racer. Every morning, she competes with a boy from her class on the way to school on the hill, but she loses the game every time. Hinako decides to get a chance to win the game from the video of her favorite cycle racer and is ready for the game the next morning…
3	"ME!ME!ME!"	Hibiki Yoshizaki	21 November 2014
"You are attacked and ravished by many girls." Shū, an anime otaku whose obsession with sexy, voluptuous heroines draws him into a sexual desired-fantasy until his life takes a surreal-psychedelic nightmarish turn while torn between his dream and his unrequited feelings for his ex-girlfriend, Hana. Notes: An anime music video for the song of the same name created by TeddyLoid ft. Daoko.
4	"Carnage"	Akira Honma	28 November 2014
A dark-twisted Wild West story about a one-armed woman with a dark and ghastly past who plots revenge against the one-eyed man for killing her father.
5	"Yoshikazu Yasuhiko & Ichiro Itanō: Collection of Key Animation Films"; Transliteration: "Yasuhiko Yoshikazu Itano Ichirō Gensatsu-shū" (Japanese: 安彦良和・板野一郎原撮集)	Yoshikazu Yasuhiko & Ichirō Itano	5 December 2014
Behind-the-scenes features comparison between key frames & finished animation of various scenes from episodes 1, 13, 17, 22 & movies of Mobile Suit Gundam animated by Yoshikazu Yasuhiko and Ichiro Itanō.
6	"20min Walk From Nishi-Ogikubo Station, 2 Bedrooms, Living Room, Dining Room, Kitchen, 2mos Deposit, No Pets Allowed."; Transliteration: "Nishi-Ogikubo-eki Toho 20-bu, 2 LDK, Shikirei 2 Kagetsu, Petto-fuka" (Japanese: 西荻窪駅徒歩20分2LDK敷礼2ヶ月ペット不可)	Mahiro Maeda & Takeshi Honda	12 December 2014
The strange adventure of a woman who finds herself in the middle of a room while being shrunk into the size of a bug.
7	"Until You Come to Me."	Tadashi Hiramatsu	19 December 2014
A short which allegedly takes place after the events of Evangelion: 3.0 You Can (Not) Redo.
8	"Tomorrow from There."; Transliteration: "Sokokara no Ashita." (Japanese: そこからの明日。)	Akemi Hayashi	9 January 2015
A young woman, feeling lost in the monotony of her solitary city life, embarks on a journey of self-discovery and rekindles her passion and confidence in everyday life.
9	"Electronic Superhuman Gridman: Boys Invent Great Hero"; Transliteration: "Denkō Chōjin Guriddoman boys invent a great hero" (Japanese: 電光超人グリッドマン Boys Invent Great Hero)	Akira Amemiya (Trigger)	16 January 2015
Takeshi Todo, the former antagonist of Gridman the Hyper Agent, reflects on the past battles of Gridman before transforming into Gridman Sigma.
10	"Yamadeloid"; Transliteration: "Yamaderoido" (Japanese: ヤマデロイド)	Takashi Horiuchi & Masahiro Emoto (Graphnica)	23 January 2015
"I will sing with all my heart". A lone, robotic samurai travels from town to town until he falls in love with a beautiful maiden. But then she gets kidnapped by the yakuza.
11	"POWER PLANT No.33"	Yasuhiro Yoshiura (Studio Rikka, Trigger)	30 January 2015
A sleeping gigantic electric generation kaiju NO.33, so-called ELEKI-MAGMA, on which the city relies for its electric power. One day, a mysterious giant robot PROTO-TAITAN appeared in the sky and destroyed the city! An accumulation of electricity, which lost its way into the body, has finally awakened ELEKI-MAGMA!
12	"Evangelion: Another Impact"	Shinji Aramaki (Sola Digital Arts)	6 February 2015
Another time, another place. An activation test of a decisive weapon was underway. With its development and operational trials shrouded in complete secrecy, the Another Number-Unit Null suddenly breaks free of human control and goes berserk. For what purpose was Another Number-Unit Null created? This is a story of the activation of another Evangelion mech.
13	"Kanón"	Mahiro Maeda	13 March 2015
Outraged at the world for its failure and imperfections, Adam attempts to destroy everything except himself with a giant cannon. God, as punishment for destroying the world, lets Adam rebuild a better world to his whim and will. Notes: An animated short based on the Karel Čapek novel Adam Stvořitel (Adam the Creator).
14	"Sex & Violence with Machspeed"	Hiroyuki Imaishi (Trigger)	20 March 2015
A shark detective named Machspeed, his sex doll assistant Sex, and his monkey henchman Violence deal with a bizarrely unusual dog client Mutt. Notes: The short features music from the independent electronic music label "Attack the Music".
15	Transliteration: "Obake-chan" (Japanese: おばけちゃん)	Shigeto Koyama	27 March 2015
The little girl named Obake-Chan is training hard to become a full-fledged ghost one day. But so far, she has had little success in scaring the people around her with her ideas. Will she ever be able to become a real ghost?
16	"Tokio of the Moon's Shadow"; Transliteration: "Tsukikage no Tokio" (Japanese: 月影のトキオ)	Mizuno Takanobu	6 April 2015
The Earth is a popular tourist resort, but it will soon be invaded by brutal aliens. Tokio, one of eight guardians of the Solar System, becomes familiar with a blind girl, Setsuko, through ham radio and comes to love her.
17	"Three Fallen Witnesses"; Transliteration: "Sanbon no Shōgensha" (Japanese: 三本の証言者)	Satoru Utsunomiya	13 April 2015
Various witnesses are called in, but their reliability is doubted. "We confirmed the first evidence. Next..."She was falling asleep before she knew it. But the conversation between two unknown people kept staying in her head. "Second?" A man and woman who call themselves police appear before Asami. But she is still suspicious of them. What is "the fire incident without burning" they are talking about? What is "the time for reproduction"? And what is "the unavoidable third secret?"
18	"The Diary of Ochibi-san"; Transliteration: "Ochibi-san" (Japanese: オチビサン)	Masashi Kawamura	20 April 2015
Let's take a journey during the four seasons with Ochibi! This is a stop-motion animation that features the Japanese seasonal traditions. Notes: An animated short crowdfunded by Kawamura and based on Moyoco Anno's manga of the same name.
19	"I Can Friday by Day!"	Kazuya Tsurumaki	4 May 2015
A schoolgirl isn't a human being, but a war vessel piloted by squirrel armies.
20A	"ME!ME!ME! CHRONIC"	Hibiki Yoshizaki	1 May 2015
An anime music video for a remix version of "ME!ME!ME!" by TeddyLoid feat. Daoko.
20B	"(Making of) Evangelion: Another Impact"	Masaru Matsumoto (technical/editor)	1 May 2015
Behind-the-scenes of the creation of Evangelion: Another Impact.
21	"Iconic Field"; Transliteration: "Gūzō Sen'iki" (Japanese: 偶像戦域)	Ikuto Yamashita	11 May 2015
People of a star similar to Earth's built civilizations on the ground of various places, like our world. They were led to the global war by evolving forces of science. But in this star, there is a secret that even the residents don't know.
22	"On a Gloomy Night"; Transliteration: "Ibuseki Yoru ni" (Japanese: イブセキヨルニ)	Tadashi Hiramatsu	15 May 2015
A revolutionary new prime minister liberates Japan and carries out the policies he promised to the voters of Japan. Hiramatsu personally approved the English subtitles used on the project's website.
23	"Memoirs of Amorous Gentlemen"; Transliteration: "Bikachō Shinshi Kaikoroku" (Japanese: 鼻下長紳士回顧録)	N/A	18 May 2015
People who know the true shape of their desires they have carefully traced those contours… like a blind man using both hands to measure the shape… In the early time of 20th century in Paris, Colette acted in a brothel without escaping with a coworker and spent every day satisfying the desires of the many customers. For her, life is stuffy, she feels only hope that by the time of the tryst with lovely Leon. But Colette doesn't get the feeling that he loves her... Women living strong in the closed paradise and [Memoirs of Amorous Gentlemen] reveal your desire for yourselves, where love and desire are crossed. Welcome to the beautiful and mysterious castle. Notes: An adaptation of Moyoco Anno's manga of the same name.
24	"Rapid Rouge"; Transliteration: "Shinsoku no Rouge" (Japanese: 神速のRouge)	Daisuke Onizuka	29 May 2015
War is a constant, but the prize has changed. Lives were lost over oil in yesteryears, but now, it is water. Yatsushima was a nation blessed with water resources, but the nations of the Western realm manipulated the ruling shogunate, turning it into a puppet regime. The outflow of water from Yatsushima to neighboring nations severely impacted the lives of its citizens. Some were unwilling to be complacent about such heinous acts. Many of these rebels were young, and their insurrection was the spark that started the Yatsushima Revolution.
25	"Hammerhead"; Transliteration: "Hanmāheddo" (Japanese: ハンマーヘッド)	Ōtarō Maijō & Mahiro Maeda	25 July 2015 (theatrical); 31 July 2015 (online)
"HAMMER HIM DEAD." I beg you, please hit, crush, and kill him. Notes: Originally announced as part of the second season lineup; taken out of the theatrical exhibition lineup after online release.
26	"COMEDY SKETCH 1989"Conte (Hitman) 1989; Transliteration: "Konto (Koroshiya) 1989" (Japanese: コント（ころしや）1989)	Kazuto Nakazawa	25 July 2015 (theatrical); 7 August 2015 (online)
Homage to the comedy sketches of the Showa era. Notes: Originally announced as part of the second season lineup, under the title "2 of killers of 2".
27	"Bubu & Bubulina"; Transliteration: "Bubu to Buburīna" (Japanese: ブブとブブリーナ)	Takashi Nakamura	25 July 2015 (theatrical); 14 August 2015 (online)
Bubu & Bubulina are two sisters who encounter a sad ghost. Bubu is the younger sister and can shoot objects from a horn she carries, while Bubulina is the older but more cynical one. One day, they encounter a blonde-haired girl gloating about how well she can dance thanks to a pair of red shoes she has on. Bubulina is unimpressed with the girl, but the shoes catch her eye, so the blonde girl offers them to her, which she accepts. The blonde girl tricks her and runs off while a ghost possesses Bubulina's body. The ghost introduces herself as Audrey and tells Bubu that she is going to dance at this show. She says that she had died before she could have the chance to perform and hear the audience cheer for her. Bubu initially feels sad but has an idea. Using her horn, she shoots out an audience that claps for Audrey, which cheers her up enough to keep dancing. With thanks to Bubu, the ghost disappears along with the shoes, leaving a dazed Bubulina to wonder what happened.
28	"ENDLESS NIGHT"	Sayo Yamamoto	21 August 2015
Kenji Miyamoto, the one and only choreographer in Japan x Atsushi Kamijo, a cartoon artist x figure skating. An animated work in a very unusual collaboration!
29	"BUREAU OF PROTO SOCIETY"; Transliteration: "Hisutorī Kikan" (Japanese: ヒストリー機関)	Yasuhiro Yoshiura	1 August 2015 (theatrical); 28 August 2015 (online)
In the far distant future... Humans are living in underground shelters in a completely controlled situation. "Why has the world gone to ruin, and what has made humans stay in the shelters?" Every day, the members of the BUREAU OF PROT SOCIETY debate the cause of the fall of the world from the past documentary videos... probably.
30	"The Ultraman"; Transliteration: "Za Urutoraman" (Japanese: ザ・ウルトラマン)	Akitoshi Yokoyama	1 August 2015 (theatrical); 4 September 2015 (online)
In the spring of 1975, peace returned to the universe once more. But then members of the Ultra Brothers started being murdered by someone, one by one. The perpetrator was Jackal the Demonic Space Overlord. Jackal was an alien defeated by the Ultraman King and banished to spend an eternity in a black hole. Having returned, Jackal sent his armies to Earth to uncover any Ultra Warriors that may be hiding in humanoid form there. Jackal's minions resorted to threatening to kill human beings held as hostages to force Ultra Warriors to reveal themselves. Just when it seemed all hope was lost, a mysterious warrior wearing a suit of armor that obscured his identity appeared from the heavens... Notes: Subtitled "Jackal vs. Ultraman"; based on the Mamoru Uchiyama manga of the same name, itself based on the Tokusatsu television series of the same name.
31	"GIRL"	Hibiki Yoshizaki	11 September 2015
A girl born with the magical power to make imagination into reality creates a vivid paradise filled with dreamlike fantasy and eventually finds herself transported into the real world to recreate a desired world more like her own. Notes: An anime music video for Daoko's songs "Samishii Kamisama" and "Yumemiteta no Atashi", with music composition co-written by Hideya Kojima. Shū and Hana from "ME!ME!ME!" appear at the end of the short.
32	"Neon Genesis: IMPACTS"; Transliteration: "Shin Seiki: Inpakutsu" (Japanese: 新世紀いんぱくつ。)	Yūhei Sakuragi	18 September 2015
Haruka Ishii, Izumi Taniguchi, and Ayako Matsuzawa fall out as their friendship becomes strained after the Angel descends to wreak havoc upon Tokyo III, which causes Ayako to force the citizens to evacuate the city to avoid the Angel's onslaughts. As they are about to live their lives separated from one another. Realizing she would be the one left behind, Haruka makes a proposition to Izumi.
33	"Ragnarok"Hello from the Countries of the World; Transliteration: "Sekai no Kuni kara Konnichi wa" (Japanese: 世界の国からこんにちは)	Kazuyoshi Katayama	25 September 2015
The Japanese representative robot, demonstrated at the venue of the International Giant Robot Exhibition in Odaiba, goes out of control due to an unknown cause and destroys buildings around the venue. The police and Japanese Self-Defence force cannot stop the robot, and the American and Russian robots are sent out to save the situation along with the request from the Japanese government and the exhibition association office.
34	"Robot on the Road"; Transliteration: "Tabi no Robo kara" (Japanese: 旅のロボから)	Hiroyuki Okiura	2 October 2015
The feeling of some encounter and farewell from that journey.
35	"Cassette Girl"; Transliteration: "Kasetto Gāru" (Japanese: カセットガール)	Hiroyasu Kobayashi	9 October 2015
20XX year, the world was wrapped in deep snow. In the world, the people of dim, cold winter had been managing all [THE MEDIA].
extra	"Mobile Police Patlabor Reboot"; Transliteration: "Kidō Keisatsu Patoreibā REBOOT" (Japanese: 機動警察パトレイバーREBOOT)	Yasuhiro Yoshiura	15 October 2016 (theatrical); 23 November 2016 (online)
We are not heroes in a robot anime show. As police officers, we protect the city and its people.

== See also ==
- Ani*Kuri15
- Genius Party
- Young Animator Training Project
