= Devil Survivor 2: The Animation =

Japanese anime television series

- Cover of the first manga volume released by Square Enix in Japan on March 27, 2013, featuring Hibiki Kuze

デビルサバイバー２ ジ・アニメーション (Debiru Sabaibā Tsū Ji Animēshon)
- Genre: Action, drama, supernatural
- Manga
- Written by: Makoto Uezu
- Illustrated by: Haruto Shiota
- Published by: Square Enix
- Imprint: Gangan
- Magazine: Monthly GFantasy
- Original run: December 18, 2012 – October 18, 2014
- Volumes: 4
- Anime television series
- Directed by: Seiji Kishi
- Produced by: Fumihiro Tanaka; Gorō Shinjuku; Jin Kawamura; Jun Fukuda; Natsuki Uetake; Ryōichi Ishihara; Susumu Machida; Toshihiro Maeda; Yasuo Suda
- Written by: Makoto Uezu
- Music by: Kōtarō Nakagawa
- Studio: Bridge
- Licensed by: AUS: Hanabee; NA: Sentai Filmworks; SEA: Medialink; UK: MVM Films (DVD); Anime Limited (Blu-ray)
- Original network: MBS, TBS, CBC, BS-TBS, Niconico
- English network: US: Anime Network
- Original run: April 4, 2013 – June 27, 2013
- Episodes: 13
- Light novel

Devil Survivor 2 The Animation: Cetus's Prequel
- Written by: Katsumi Amagawa
- Published by: Kodansha Box
- Published: June 3, 2013

Devil Survivor 2: The Animation (Japanese: デビルサバイバー２ ジ・アニメーション, Hepburn: Debiru Sabaibā Tsū Ji Animēshon) is a 2013 Japanese anime series based on the Nintendo DS video game, Shin Megami Tensei: Devil Survivor 2 by Atlus. The series was directed by Seiji Kishi, with series composition by Makoto Uezu, based on the original story by Atlus and animated by Bridge. The series stars voice actors Hiroshi Kamiya as Hibiki Kuze along with Nobuhiko Okamoto, Aya Uchida, Junichi Suwabe and Takahiro Sakurai. When a mysterious calamity plunges the world into a state of chaos, Hibiki Kuze and his friends Daichi Shijima and Io Nitta are suddenly thrown from their normal lives into a battle of survival against creatures called Septentriones seeking to bring the world to ruin. Gaining the ability to summon demons from a cell phone app, Hibiki and his friends team up with an organization known as the JP's to help protect Japan and above all else—survive.

The thirteen episode series premiered in Japan on MBS on April 4, 2013, and was subsequently licensed by Sentai Filmworks in North America, Hanabee in Australia and New Zealand and by MVM Films and later Anime Limited in the United Kingdom and Ireland for English home video releases. A manga adaptation was serialized in Monthly GFantasy between December 2012 and October 2014. A light novel prequel was also published by Kodansha Box. In addition, two supplementary books and three Drama CDs along with a host of other merchandise were released. Critics praised the series for its dark animation styles and backgrounds. However the majority of reviewers had mixed feelings towards the cast of characters since they felt that while the characters were either not appealing or developed enough, their deaths were impactful to the viewer.

== Plot ==
One Sunday afternoon, Hibiki Kuze and Daichi Shijima receive macabre videos from the Nicaea (Note: ニカイア, Nikaia) website which predict their deaths mere seconds before they are involved in a gruesome train accident. They are spared however, when a Demon Summoning App (Note: 悪魔召喚アプリ, Akuma Shōkan Apuri) installs itself on their phones and allows the duo and schoolmate Io Nitta to escape from carnivorous monsters feasting on the dead in the wrecked subway station. The trio are shocked to discover a massive catastrophe on the surface and take refuge in Roppongi with other panicked citizens. Suddenly, when a creature known as Dubhe (ドゥベ, Duube) appears and attacks the crowd, Hibiki puts a stop to the carnage by summoning a demon from the app and destroying the creature. This prompts the Japan Meteorological Agency, Geomagnetism Research Department - JP's (Note: 気象庁・指定地磁気調査部、「ジプス」, Kishōchō. Shitei Chijiki Chōsa bu, 'Jipusu') to detain Hibiki and his friends and they are brought before its head—Yamato Hotsuin, who enlists their aid in defeating the remaining Septentriones (Note: セプテントリオン, Seputentorion) to prevent the end of the world in one week.

Yamato then dispatches them on a mission to retrieve the JP's scientist Fumi Kanno with fellow demon summoners Hinako Kujou and Keita Wakui, which ends up as a success at the cost of Keita's life. Following a devastating battle with Merak (メラク, Meraku), Hibiki joins the Resistance leader—Ronaldo Kuriki and learns of Yamato's true intentions as opposed to his own. As events progress, Airi Ban and Jungo Torii attempt to recapture the JP's base from the Resistance but chaos ensues when Phecda (フェクダ, Fekuda) appears and targets a defenseless Hibiki. However Yamato arrives and slays the Septentrione, saving Hibiki's life. In the aftermath, Yamato and Ronaldo engage in a heated debate over their ideals and the situation only escalates when Alcor appears and proclaims himself to be the creator of both Nicaea and the Demon Summoning App, which he had hoped would aid humanity in their darkest hour.

An unlikely alliance between the JP's, Resistance and the unaffiliated demon summoners result in the destruction of Megrez (メグレズ, Megurezu) the following day. While a somber Hibiki struggles to cope with the steep cost of victory, Alcor reveals the true nature of events thus far. He explains it all to be the will of an entity known as Polaris (ポラリス, Porarisu) as it seeks to erase humanity's "artificial" reality using its Void phenomenon and hence restore the "natural" order. Therefore, it sent the Septentriones to destroy the spiritual barriers protecting Japan from the Void. When Hinako and Airi defeat Alioth (アリオト, Arioto) the next day, its massive shell plummets from orbit and crushes the city—killing thousands more people and sparking outrage from Hibiki over the lengths Yamato will go to achieve his goal. Unperturbed, Yamato uses Io to summon a demon called Lugh and defeats the next Septentrione—Mizar (ミザール, Mizaaru). However, when the demon possesses Io and attempts to kill Yamato for its imprisonment, Hibiki wields the Dragon Stream (Note: 龍脈, Ryumyaku) and saves Io.

As the week draws to a close, Benetnasch (ベネトナシュ, Benetonashu) appears on Saturday and completely destroys the barriers. Upon engaging the creature, Yamato allows the other summoners to die by ignoring them in the battle and ultimately defeats it with Hibiki and Daichi's help. In the aftermath, Alcor decides to support Hibiki and Yamato ends up killing him. Finally, Yamato activates the Transport Terminal to seek an audience with Polaris and Io and Daichi forfeit their lives to give Hibiki a chance at going after Yamato and saving the world. Facing each other in another dimension, Hibiki desperately tries to reach out to Yamato and ultimately overpowers him with aid from his fallen comrades. Polaris then appears and Hibiki asks it to restore the world to the way it was. He then finds himself one week in the past, with his revived friends and his memory intact and reifies the will of humanity to keep on living.

=== Main characters ===
Hibiki Kuze (久世 響希, Kuze Hibiki)
Voiced by: Hiroshi Kamiya (Japanese); Patrick Poole (English)
Hibiki is the 18-year-old protagonist of the series. He is granted the ability to summon demons from Nicaea after experiencing a train accident on his way home from taking mock exams. With this newfound power he finds himself intertwined in a battle of survival against the Septentriones who seek to destroy the world. Kamiya did not express any opinions on Hibiki's character. However he was very clear to point out that despite the series being called Devil Survivor 2, it is not a sequel to a previous series but rather an independent story all its own.

Daichi Shijima (志島 大地, Shijima Daichi)
Voiced by: Nobuhiko Okamoto (Japanese); Greg Ayres (English)
Daichi is Hibiki's best friend and was with him during the train accident where he was also granted the power of summoning demons from Nicaea. Okamoto praised the visual effects of the nighttime battle scenes, describing them as being "very beautiful".

Io Nitta (新田 維緒, Nitta Io)
Voiced by: Aya Uchida (Japanese); Jessica Boone (English)
Io is a beautiful and intelligent senior at the same high school attended by Hibiki and Daichi. She was also granted the power of demon summoning by Nicaea after being involved in the train accident. Uchida remarked that players of the original Devil Survivor 2 video game would enjoy the various viewpoints presented in the series. She also felt that the audience would be able to empathize with the characters since they are portrayed in a way that raises the question, "What would you do in that situation?"

Yamato Hotsuin (峰津院 大和, Hotsuin Yamato)
Voiced by: Junichi Suwabe (Japanese); John Gremillion (English)
Yamato is the director of the Japan Meteorological Agency, Geomagnetism Research Department which was established by his own Hotsuin family. He is a level-headed thinker and able to maintain composure in most situations. Suwabe praised the cohesiveness of the music, video and dialogue of the series. He also noted that Yamato's most appealing trait is his strength.

Anguished One (憂う者, Ureumono) / "Alcor"
Voiced by: Takahiro Sakurai (Japanese); Illich Guardiola (English)
A mysterious white-haired individual who appears to Hibiki and Yamato at various times during the week. He is the creator of the Nicaea website and the Demon Summoning App. Also known as "Alcor", he is the 8th Septentrione. Sakurai described Alcor's enigmatic appeal as laying in the aspect of being part of something larger than himself. He went on to praise the animation style, describing it as "powerful and immersive".

== Production ==
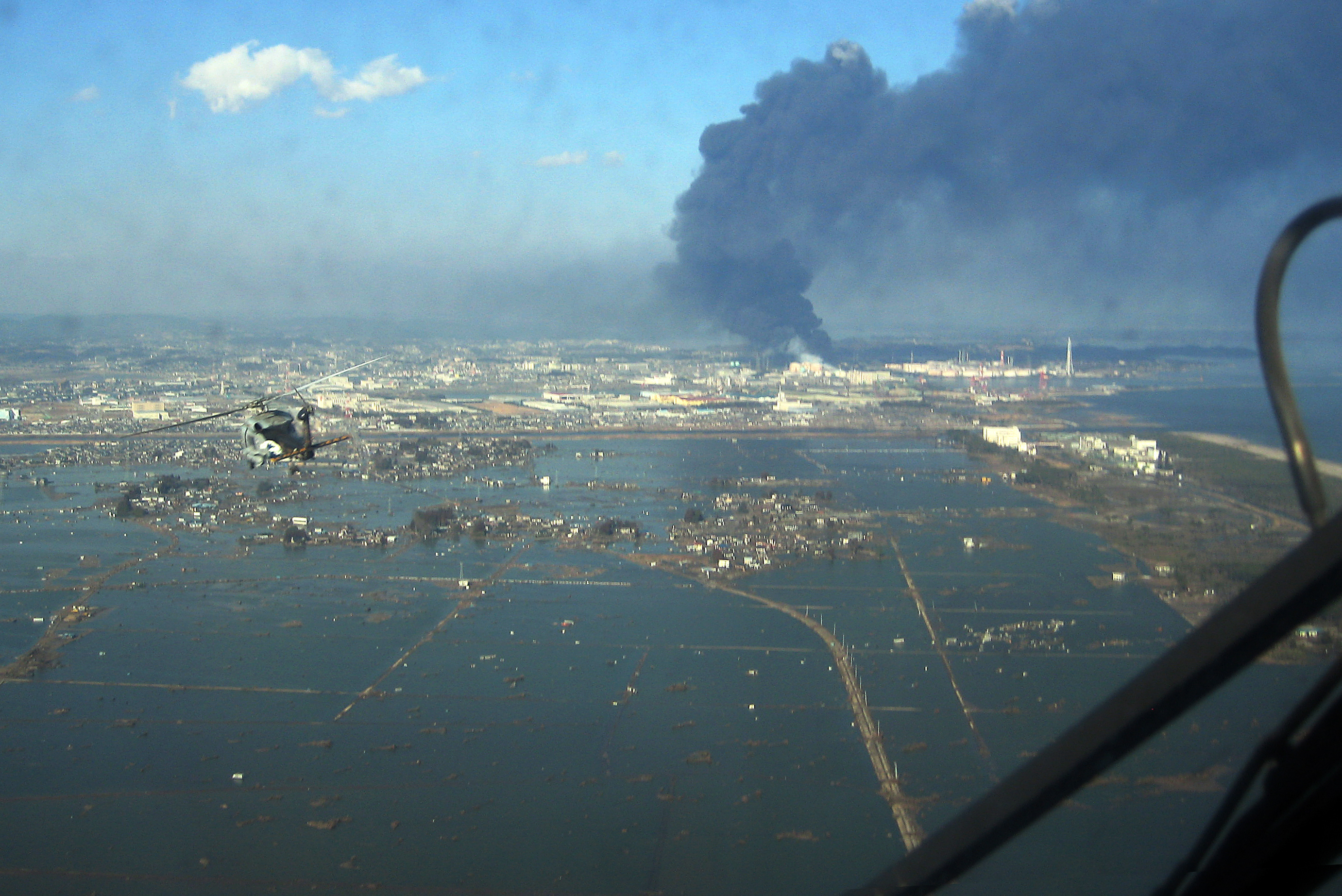
Director Seiji Kishi compared the destruction depicted in the anime to the 2011 Tōhoku earthquake and tsunami which struck Japan.

Devil Survivor 2: The Animation was produced by the Bridge animation studio of Japan using a team henceforth known as the Devil Survivor 2: The Animation Committee. The series was directed by veteran anime director Seiji Kishi best known for directing the anime adaptation of Atlus's 2008 video game Persona 4. During production, Kishi remarked that the calamity of which the story describes was reminiscent of the 2011 Tōhoku earthquake and tsunami. He also praised the animated depictions of Suzuhito Yasuda's character designs. Makoto Uezu was selected as both the script writer and series composer for the anime. In an interview, Uezu commented that he had been a huge fan of the Megami Tensei series since his childhood and that his interests in the occult and electronic technology aided in the composition. Uezu further remarked that the story followed a "hard path" whereby the heroes were forced into making difficult choices at key points in the plot whilst the characters simultaneously explored sensitive issues related to human ethics and morality.

The series' character designs were drawn by Etsushi Sajima and were based on the original designs by Suzuhito Yasuda which received praise from Director Kishi. The original designs of the Septentriones were created by Mohiro Kitoh who remarked that since he was not directly engaged in the production process, he had to wait until the finished product was released before he could see the animated versions of his designs. The other half of the series' creatures i.e. the various devils (demons) used were designed by Hiroyuki Kanbe, while prop designs were done by Hatsue Nakayama and color designs were done by Keiichi Funada. Finally leaving Kazuto Shimoyama to oversee this area of production as the art director. The musical score was composed by Kōtarō Nakagawa. Nakagawa was initially surprised to have been offered to be the musical composer but took up the role as a challenge. In addition to Nagakawa, Sound Direction was done by Satoki Iida along with Sound Effects by Iki Okuda. Other staff members included Assistant Director Yoshimichi Hirai, Animation Designer Eriko Ito, Composite Director Katsufumi Sato, CG Director Yuji Koshida and Ayumu Takahashi as the series Editor and Producer Yasuo Suda.

=== Music and audio ===
Devil Survivor 2: The Animation uses three pieces of theme music: one opening theme, one closing theme and one insert song. The theme sequences are not used consistently throughout the series since the episode producers decided to prioritize story-telling to their use which helped keep the plot within thirteen episodes. The anime debuted with "Take Your Way" by Livetune adding Fukase of Sekai no Owari as the opening theme for the first eight episodes and then from the eleventh, with an instrumental version being used on the thirteenth. The theme is not played but credited in both the ninth and tenth episodes. The closing theme is "Be" by Song Riders and is used from the first through ninth episodes and then from the eleventh. The insert song titled "Each and All" by Livetune adding Rin Oikawa of Q;indivi also doubled as the closing theme of the tenth episode.

Song Riders released "Be" on May 22, 2013. This was followed by the release of Livetune's "Take Your Way" single on June 5, 2013. "Take Your Way" sold 9,776 copies in its first week, ranking number 12 on the Oricon Singles Chart. The song went on to become the number 1 single for the 23rd week of 2013. The official "Take Your Way" music video features visuals and direction by Fantasia Utomaro. The first soundtrack album was bundled with the first Blu-ray and DVD volume of the series and released in Japan on June 19, 2013. The second album was released in a similar manner, with the third Blu-ray and DVD volume and released on August 21, 2013.

A bi-weekly internet radio show hosted by Shuta Morishima was broadcast between April 4 and July 11, 2013, on the Hibiki Radio and Sound Springs stations. Three drama CDs were additionally released and bundled with the second, fourth and seventh Blu-ray and DVD volumes on July 17, 2013, September 19, 2013 and December 18, 2013 respectively. The CDs collectively tell parts of a story titled, "Ganbare Hibiki-kun!" (Note: がんばれヒビキくん！).

Track list

Take Your Way by Livetune adding Fukase(from Sekai no Owari)
No.	Title	Vocalist	Length
1.	"「Take Your Way」(「DEVIL SURVIVOR2 THE ANIMATION」Opening Theme)"	livetune adding Fukase(from Sekai no Owari)	04:36
2.	"「Ready for Calming」"	livetune adding Fukase(from Sekai no Owari)	02:26
3.	"「Each and All」(「DEVIL SURVIVOR2 THE ANIMATION」Insert Song)"	livetune adding Rin Oikawa from Q;indivi	05:19
4.	"「Take Your Way」(Inst)"		04:36
5.	"「Each and All」(Inst)"		05:19
Total length:			22:16

Trauma/Be by Song Riders
No.	Title	Vocalist	Length
1.	"Trauma"	Song Riders	03:41
2.	"Be"	Song Riders	04:05
3.	"On Fire-acoustic ver.-"	Song Riders	04:02
4.	"Trauma-instrumental-"		03:41
5.	"Be-instrumental-"		04:05
Total length:			19:34

Original Soundtrack Volume 1
No.	Title	Length
1.	"Monday's Turmoil (激動の月曜日)"	1:44
2.	"The Morning Sun We Thought We Were Going to See Again (何度でも繰り返すと思っていた朝日)"	2:08
3.	"Shibuya (渋谷)"	1:41
4.	"Daichi (ダイチ)"	1:39
5.	"Daichi and Hibiki (ダイチとヒビキ)"	2:09
6.	"Nicaea (ニカイア)"	1:38
7.	"The Beginning of the End (終焉への幕開け)"	2:01
8.	"Extreme Situation (極限状態)"	1:54
9.	"Many Farewells (沢山の別れ)"	2:28
10.	"JP's Headquarters (ジプス本局)"	2:01
11.	"Sign of the Enemy (敵影)"	2:25
12.	"VS"	1:59
13.	"Great Disturbance (大騒ぎ)"	2:09
14.	"Io (イオ)"	2:05
15.	"VS2"	1:36
16.	"Invader's Attack (侵略者の来襲)"	1:42
17.	"Septentrion (セプテントリオン)"	2:06
18.	"Wing (羽)"	2:17
19.	"Shining One (輝く者)"	2:02
Total length:		37:44

Original Soundtrack Volume 2
No.	Title	Length
1.	"Mu (「無」)"	1:40
2.	"3RD DAY Fuon no Kayoubi (3RD DAY 不穏の火曜日)"	2:07
3.	"Sennyuu (潜入)"	1:49
4.	"Trumpeter (トランペッター)"	0:34
5.	"VS3"	2:15
6.	"Chessboard (チェスボード)"	2:05
7.	"Ureu Mono (憂う者)"	1:42
8.	"catch"	0:10
9.	"4TH DAY Henyou no Suiyoubi (4TH DAY 変容の水曜日)"	2:10
10.	"Alcor to Yamato (アルコルとヤマト)"	1:57
11.	"Sarasvati (サラスヴァティ)"	0:10
12.	"Byakko (ビャッコ)"	2:13
13.	"Lorelei (ローレライ)"	0:10
14.	"5TH DAY Kyougaku no Mokuyoubi (5TH DAY 驚愕の木曜日)"	2:23
15.	"Houtsu Inka no Inbou (峰津院家の陰謀)"	2:06
16.	"survive"	1:43
17.	"Ronaldo (ロナウド)"	1:35
18.	"7TH DAY Sorezore no Doyoubi (7TH DAY それぞれの土曜日)"	2:33
19.	"VS LAST"	2:21
20.	"Kagayaku Chiheisen (輝く地平線)"	1:31
21.	"LAST DAY Ketsujitsu no Nichiyoubi (LAST DAY 結実の日曜日)"	2:36
Total length:		35:50

Drama CDs: "Ganbare Hibiki-kun!"
No.	Title	Length
1.	"Part 1: 「ヒビキくんヤマトちゃんと出会う」"
2.	"Part 2: 「ヒビキくんクリッキーにさらわれる」"
3.	"Part 3: 「ヒビキくん最後の選択」"

== Release ==
The thirteen-episode series premiered on the Animeism programming block of MBS on April 4, 2013, during the 26:05 (02:05 JST) time slot. This technically resulted in the episodes airing on the days following the ones scheduled. The anime was later aired on TBS, CBC and BS-TBS with online streaming on the Japanese Niconico website. The series was acquired by Crunchyroll for online simulcast streaming with English subtitles in the territories of USA, Canada, UK, Ireland, South Africa, Australia, New Zealand, Netherlands, and Scandinavia. The Anime Network and Hulu later picked up the series for streaming on their online services. The series was also digitally released on the Movies & TV platform by Microsoft and the PlayStation Store.

On June 19, 2013, Pony Canyon began releasing the series on Blu-ray and DVD volumes in Japan—with the first volume including the first episode and a bonus CD featuring the first Original Soundtrack for the series. The following volumes each contained two episodes with all but the fifth and sixth volumes containing bonus discs of which included a three volume Drama CD series. The seventh and final DVD and Blu-ray volume was released on December 18, 2013, while all Limited Edition volumes were distributed with a bonus poster featuring characters from the series. Sentai Filmworks licensed the series for distribution through selected digital outlets and a home video release in North America. The company released the series in its entirety on DVD format on July 1, 2014, with English and Japanese audio options along with English subtitles. Hanabee later licensed the series for a home media release in Australia and New Zealand. The company released the complete series on a DVD volume on September 3, 2014. MVM Films obtained the distribution rights in the United Kingdom and Ireland, and released it on a single DVD set on October 20, 2014. Pony Canyon released the entire series on a Blu-ray box set in Japan on January 30, 2015. Sentai Filmworks followed their 2014 DVD release with a Blu-ray format release in North America on April 21, 2015. Hanabee followed suit with their own Blu-ray release on May 6, 2015. Anime Limited released the series on Blu-ray in the United Kingdom and Ireland on July 22, 2024.

== Related media ==
=== Manga adaptation ===
A manga adaptation was serialized in Square Enix's Monthly GFantasy magazine. It is illustrated by Haruto Shiota and written by Makoto Uezu; based on the original Devil Survivor 2 story by Atlus. The manga made its debut in the January 2013 issue of GFantasy which was published in Japan on December 18, 2012. It ran for twenty-five chapters and ended in the November 2014 issue which was published on October 18, 2014. The chapters have been collected and released into four tankōbon volumes between March 27, 2013 and December 27, 2014.

==== Volumes ====
No.	Release date	ISBN
1	March 27, 2013	978-4757539327
1. Sunday's Melancholy ① (憂鬱の日曜日①, Yūutsu no Nichiyōbi (1)); 2. Sunday's Melancholy ② (憂鬱の日曜日②, Yūutsu no Nichiyōbi (2)); 3. Monday's Turmoil ① (激動の月曜日①, Gekidō no Getsuyōbi (1)); 4. Monday's Turmoil ② (激動の月曜日②, Gekidō no Getsuyōbi (2)); 5. Monday's Turmoil ③ (激動の月曜日③, Gekidō no Getsuyōbi (3))
2	September 27, 2013	978-4757540774
6. Monday's Turmoil ④ (激動の月曜日④, Gekidō no Getsuyōbi (4)); 7. Monday's Turmoil ⑤ (激動の月曜日⑤, Gekidō no Getsuyōbi (5)); 8. Monday's Turmoil ⑥ (激動の月曜日⑥, Gekidō no Getsuyōbi (6)); 9. Monday's Turmoil ⑦ (激動の月曜日⑦, Gekidō no Getsuyōbi (7)); 10. Monday's Turmoil ⑧ (激動の月曜日⑧, Gekidō no Getsuyōbi (8))
3	March 27, 2014	978-4757542679
11. Tuesday's Disquiet ① (不穏の火曜日①, Fuon no Kaiyōbi (1)); 12. Tuesday's Disquiet ② (不穏の火曜日②, Fuon no Kaiyōbi (2)); 13. Tuesday's Disquiet ③ (不穏の火曜日③, Fuon no Kaiyōbi (3)); 14. Wednesday's Changes ① (変容の水曜日①, Hen'yō no Suiyōbi (1)); 15. Wednesday's Changes ② (変容の水曜日②, Hen'yō no Suiyōbi (2)); 16. Thursday's Shock ① (衝撃の木曜日①, Shōgeki no Mokuyōbi (1)); 17. Thursday's Shock ② (衝撃の木曜日②, Shōgeki no Mokuyōbi (2))
4	December 27, 2014	978-4757545243
18. Friday's Partings ① (送別の金曜日①, Sōbetsu no Kin'yōbi (1)); 19. Friday's Partings ② (送別の金曜日②, Sōbetsu no Kin'yōbi (2)); 20. A Saturday Towards (Coexistence) ① (それぞれの土曜日①, Sorezore no Doyōbi (1)); 21. A Saturday Towards (Coexistence) ② (それぞれの土曜日②, Sorezore no Doyōbi (2)); 22. A Saturday Towards (Coexistence) ③ (それぞれの土曜日③, Sorezore no Doyōbi (3)); 23. Sunday's Fruition ① (結実の日曜日①, Ketsujitsu no Nichiyōbi (1)); 24. Sunday's Fruition ② (結実の日曜日②, Ketsujitsu no Nichiyōbi (2)); 25. Sunday's Fruition ③ (結実の日曜日③, Ketsujitsu no Nichiyōbi (3))

=== Light novels ===
A light novel written by Katsumi Amagawa titled "Devil Survivor 2 The Animation: Cetus's Prequel" was published by Kodansha Box on June 3, 2013. The events of the novel take place before the anime and depict a younger Yamato as Director of JP's and his preparation for the coming apocalypse. A supplementary book titled "Devil Survivor 2 The Animation: Character Archives" was published by Square Enix on June 27, 2013. The book contained character biographies in addition to commentaries by Seiji Kishi and Makoto Uezu. Another book titled "Devil Survivor 2 The Animation: Creator Works" was published by Pony Canyon in Japan on August 9, 2013. This book contained broad interviews from most of the animation staff, including photos and a behind-the-scene look at the animation process and at the Devil Survivor 2 world.

=== Merchandising ===
Numerous products including figurines and mobile phone accessories among other things were released in response to the anime. A set of 16 posters was released by Pos x Pos Collection on October 18, 2013.

== Reception ==
The first episode earned an audience approval rating of 1.4% in Osaka's Kansai area and 1.9% in Tokyo's Kantō area during its premiere on April 4 and 5 in those regions respectively. The first Japanese DVD volume of the series sold 1,933 copies in its first week, ranking number 7 on the Oricon DVD Chart. Its second volume ranked 12, selling 844 copies in its first week, while its third debuted at number 23 with 721 copies. Its sixth volume ranked at number 13 and sold 648 copies. The second Japanese Blu-ray volume of the series sold 1,488 copies in its first week, ranking number 9 on the Oricon Blu-ray Chart, while the sixth volume debuted at number 10 and sold 1,200 copies.

A seasonal review column on the Anime News Network called The Stream generally made light remarks of the first four episodes. Written by Bamboo Dong, the editor called the series mindlessly fun; jokingly citing how the cell phones are always pointed directly at the demons as if they would be incapable of fighting if it were otherwise. Dong also likened the series as watching someone else play the video game. The designs of the various demons and Septentriones were described as the most interesting part of the series. On the other hand, the editor described the immense amount of [video game] plot packed into the next batch of four episodes as messy. Dong also referred to the central premise as being pretty dark since it involved the main characters constantly receiving videos showing exactly how their friends would die. The editor gave the series props for not dabbling in the destruction porn taking place since all of the widespread death around Japan is implied, but added that showing some of it would have aided the realism of the story. After reviewing twelve episodes Dong was not able to develop any interest in the characters. This continued into the series finale and Dong still felt that the characters were not fleshed out as much as they could have been. Dong explained that since there was basically no time to explore how the characters reacted to a disappearing world, it was essentially dehumanizing to such an extent that their deaths carried no emotional weight. Dong presented a full series review in their Shelf Life column and expressed that viewers who like brawn, action and some emotion will enjoy the series as long as they can come to terms with the fact that they'll pretty much just be watching someone play a video game for several hours.

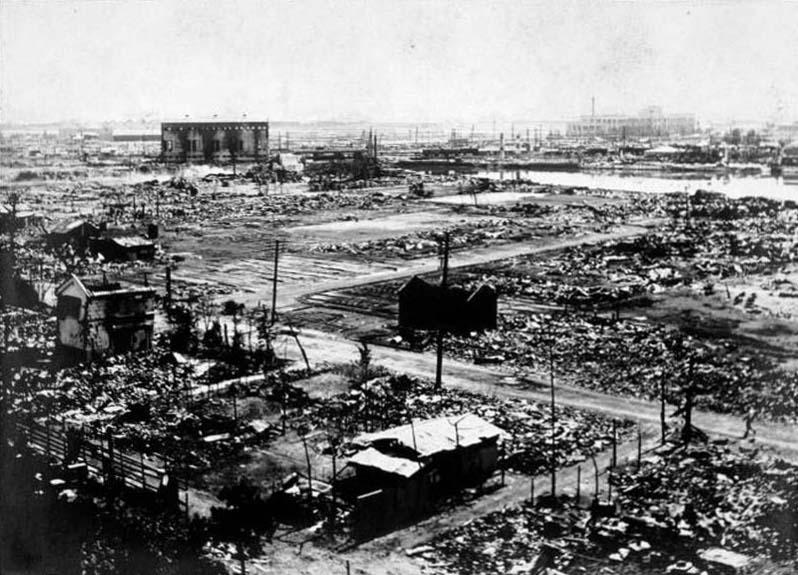
The destruction caused in the series was thought of as being similar to the real-world devastation brought to Japan by the 1923 Great Kantō earthquake.

The Spring 2013 Anime Preview Guide written by Rebecca Silverman, also of the Anime News Network, expressed differing sentiments than that of Dong. Silverman was quick to mention that she had not previously played the game to which the series was based on. With that being said, she described the first episode as not feeling like a game adaptation since you at no point have the sensation of watching someone else play. She also noted that the transformation from the everyday world to one of total chaos and destruction as both swift and impressive. She supported this by citing similar descriptions of the destruction caused by the Great Kantō earthquake of the 1920s. In her full series review, Silverman went into detail about how noticeably dark the series as a whole is when taking into account its animated depictions coupled with the death themes used. Unlike fellow reviewer Bamboo Dong, Silverman felt that character deaths would hit viewers more personally since they get to know them as the story progress and are then suddenly torn down. She further wrote that nearly every character death can potentially pack a punch since they are removed from the ending animation upon their demise. On the other hand, Silverman remarked that some of the characters were truly unlikable as they did not appear to grow and change.

After seven episodes, Richard Eisenbeis of Kotaku disliked the series so much that he discouraged viewers from watching it for that particular season. He supported this by stating that the premise of teenagers summoning monsters has been done to death and that the adaptation has no compelling mysteries nor are there deeper psychological dilemmas being explored. Eisenbeis shared sentiments with the Anime News Network reviewers when he elaborated on what he called the "woefully underdeveloped" characters of Devil Survivor 2 who are only given rudimentary back-stories. This had the added effect of making it nearly impossible to figure out who exactly is a one-off character and who is a main character since they are all equally subjected to the threat of death. Eisenbeis noted that this made their demise genuinely shocking as it added to the viewing tension. Eisenbeis went on to write that the other characters were contrast to the main villain (or antihero) Yamato Hotsuin since he gets so much development that much of the series' runtime is spent on his backstory and goals than all the other characters combined. This helps give an in-depth understanding of the character and simultaneously made him an excellent villain.

The UK Anime Network had Andy Hanley review the first four episodes and he expressed a much more positive outlook than previous reviewers. Hanley wrote about how fast the series was in setting up its premise and described it as an in at the deep end experience. Hanley cited the ruination of Tokyo at the end of the first episode and the countless deaths that occur by episode four to support this. Hanley argued that while this pace leaves the series open to being labelled as shallow, it's actually very effective in keeping the viewer engaged.

== Notes and references ==
Japanese
