= Faust (magazine) =

Japanese literary magazine

- Cover of the first issue
- Editor: Katsushi Ōta
- Categories: Fiction
- Frequency: Irregular
- Founded: 2003
- First issue: October 2003
- Final issue: September 2011
- Company: Kodansha; Del Rey Manga
- Country: Japan
- Language: Japanese

Faust (Japanese: ファウスト, Hepburn: Fausuto) was a literary magazine published irregularly by Kodansha since 2003 promoted as a "Fighting Illustrated Novels Magazine." The magazine featured young writers and a style derived from light novels. The latest issue, Vol. 8, was published at the end of September 2011, and the magazine announced its dissolution with Vol. 9.

Del Rey Manga released an English language edition in August 2008 and planned to publish at least two volumes total, with content culled from all issues of the Japanese magazine. Local language editions in South Korea and Taiwan have also been released.

== Overview ==
Based on the prototype of the doujinshi Tandem Rotor Methodology (タンデムローターの方法論, Tandemu rōtā no hōhōron) published by Bungaku Flea Market, the first issue was launched as part of a project to develop a new magazine project to commemorate Kodansha's 100th anniversary (in 2009). The editor-in-chief was the project proposer, Katsushi Ōta (who was working in Kodansha's Literary Book Publishing Department No. 3 at the time of the first issue), and in the early stages the magazine was edited only by him. The format was a 17 x 11 cm paperbook book size, and the number of pages increased as the publication progressed, and branched out into sister publications like Pandora and Comic Faust.

The contents consisted mainly of short stories written specially for the magazine, as well as reviews, manga, color illustrations, essays, and interview articles. The novels were mainly written by Ōtarō Maijō, Yuya Sato, and Nisio Isin, who were members of the Tandem Rotor Methodology dōjin group and Mephisto Prize winners, and were later joined by Otsuichi, Tatsuhiko Takimoto, Takekuni Kitayama, Kinoko Nasu, who was highly regarded as a scenario writer for visual novels, and Ryukishi07. Because of its editorial concept that emphasized visual elements, it was considered a light novel magazine in the broad sense of the word, but because of the above-mentioned origin of the authors, many of the works published in the magazine differed from the light novels of the same era, and some of the published works came to be called "Faustian." The word "Shindenki" (新伝綺) was also proposed as a genre of the novels.

Editor-in-Chief Ōta cited Kouhei Kadono as the originating author who directly influenced the formation of Faust from the world of light novels.

From the time of its first issue, the magazine employed Hiroki Azuma, Kiyoshi Kasai, Tamaki Saitō, and others to support the authors in terms of commentary and critique. The first issue was scheduled to include a review by Eiji Ōtsuka, who presided over its sibling magazine Shingenjitsu (Kadokawa Shoten), but it was not published because of its criticism of the high praise that Ōtarō Maijō was receiving from critics (it was later published in the January 2004 issue of Waseda Bungaku as "If the World Were a Village Named Ōtarō Maijō.").

The magazine featured an elaborate overall design, with original fonts for each novel and a fold-out cover.

From the perspective of the publishing business, the magazine was unique in that it took advantage of the bottlenecks in the publishing distribution system maintained under the resale price maintenance and consignment systems, and brought the methods of weekly magazines and manga magazines for mass consumption, Kodansha's forte, to literary magazines. As a distribution classification, the magazine was a mook, and both the magazine code "Magazine 63899-48" and the ISBN were assigned to it (up to Vol. 7).

Vol. 8 had no magazine code indicated and was treated as a standard book. It was also mentioned in the editorial postscript and in Ōta's tweet that Vol. 9 would leave Kodansha and be published by Seikaisha, but there has been no further movement toward publication since then.

== Prominent Contributors ==
- Nisio Isin
- Otaro Maijo - a novelist who was awarded Yukio Mishima Prize from Shinchosha Publishing, 2003, for Asura Girl
- Yuya Sato - a novelist who was awarded Yukio Mishima Prize from Shinchosha Publishing, 2007, for The 1000 novels and a Backbeard
- Otsu-ichi
- Tatsuhiko Takimoto
- Kouhei Kadono
- Kinoko Nasu
- Ryukishi07

== Faust Award ==
The Faust Award is a fiction prize for which the magazine began accepting submissions at the same time Faust was first published in Japan. It was open to short stories, and in accordance with Faust's overseas expansion, it was also held in Taiwan and South Korea. In Japan, the results of the 5th Faust Award, which closed on March 31, 2006, have not been announced, and although applications were accepted up to the 6th round, the results remain unknown. Taiwan's Fúwénzhì Newcomer Award, which had ceased accepting entries since the publication of the Taiwanese version of Faust was suspended in the summer of 2007, was renamed the Fúwénzì Newcomer Award in October 2009, and was reborn as an award for full-length light novels and BL novels. In Korea, the contest was still accepting entries, but it was announced in Vol. 6A, released in July 2009, that the contest will now focus mainly on full-length works.

== Publication history ==
=== Japan ===
- Vol. 1, October 2003, 528 pages, 933 yen (later 980 yen). ISBN 978-4061795532
- Vol. 2, March 2004, 600 pages, 1100 yen ISBN 978-4061795549
- Vol. 3, July 2004, 752 pages, 1365 yen ISBN 978-4061794306
- Vol. 4, November 2004, 800 pages, 1470 yen ISBN 978-4061794467
- Vol. 5, May 2005, 840 pages, 1575 yen ISBN 978-4061795723
- Vol. 6A, November 2005, 908 pages, 1680 yen ISBN 978-4061795860
- Vol. 6B, December 2005, 1002 pages, 1785 yen ISBN 978-4061795877
- Comic Faust, June 2006 ISBN 978-4063788082
- Vol. 7, August 2008, 1240 pages, 1890 yen ISBN 978-4063788211
- Vol. 8, September 2011, 1174 pages, 1890 yen ISBN 978-4063793925

=== Taiwan ===
- Vol. 1, February 2006
- Vol. 2, June 2006
- Vol. 3A, August 2006
- Vol. 3B, November 2006
- Vol. 4A, August 2007

=== South Korea ===
- Vol. 1, April 2006
- Vol. 2, August 2006
- Vol. 3, January 2007
- Vol. 4, June 2007
- Vol. 5, April 2008
- Vol. 6A, July 2009
- Vol. 6B, August 2009

=== English ===
- Vol. 1, August 2008
- Vol. 2, June 2009
