= The Dragon Dentist =

Anime TV series and net animation

- The title card for the original short anime.

龍の歯医者 (Ryū no Haisha)
- Created by: Ōtarō Maijō
- Original net animation
- Directed by: Ōtarō Maijō
- Produced by: Tomoyuki Ogata
- Written by: Ōtarō Maijō
- Music by: Yoshitaka Koyama
- Studio: Studio Khara
- Licensed by: UK: Anime Limited
- Released: October 2014 (TIFF); 7 November 2014 (online); 26 August 2016 (re-release)
- Runtime: 9 minutes
- Anime television series
- Directed by: Kazuya Tsurumaki
- Produced by: Tomoyuki Ogata; Kenichirō Naeshiro
- Written by: Ōtarō Maijō; Yōji Enokido
- Music by: Hiroshi Nakamura (i-dep); Tomisiro
- Studio: Studio Khara
- Licensed by: NA: Sentai Filmworks
- Original network: NHK BS Premium
- Original run: 18 February 2017 – 25 February 2017
- Episodes: 2

The Dragon Dentist (Japanese: 龍の歯医者, Hepburn: Ryū no Haisha) is an 8-minute-long original net animation written and directed by Ōtarō Maijō that was released as the first part of Hideaki Anno's weekly series Japan Animator Expo. The story follows a girl who is tasked with becoming a dentist for a dragon. A two-part anime television special adaptation was aired in February 2017.

== Synopsis ==
Nonoko is a newly appointed dentist and her mission is to protect the dragon, the guardian of the country, from tooth-cavity bacteria. One day, amid increasingly fierce battles with the neighboring country, Nonoko finds on the dragon's tooth an unconscious boy soldier from the enemy country. His name is Bell, and he has been resurrected from inside the tooth by the dragon—a supernatural phenomenon that legend says occurs before a major disaster. As Nonoko and Bell go through a series of fierce battles, they eventually learn to accept their fate.

== Cast ==
Character	Japanese	English
Nonoko Kishii	Fumika Shimizu	Xanthe Huynh
Bell	Nobuhiko Okamoto	Xander Mobus
Shibana	Megumi Hayashibara	Laura Post
Godo	Kōichi Yamadera	Taylor Henry
Arisugawa	Kaori Nazuka	Celeste Henderson
Blanco	Suzuki Matsuo	Kirk Thornton

== Production ==
Hideaki Anno announced the Animator Expo weekly anime shorts at the Tokyo International Film Festival in October 2014, with The Dragon Dentist as its first short. The short was written and directed by Ōtarō Maijō and produced by Tomoyuki Ogata, with Anno and Nobuo Kawakami of Dwango serving as executive producers. Animation was produced by Khara and directed by Kazuya Tsurumaki. Yasuyuki Kosaka served as character designer in collaboration with Yoshimichi Kameda, who served as animation character designer. Yuka Kawai served as art director under the supervision of Kentaro Akiyama. Hiroyasu Kobayashi provided CGI direction, and Toyotoku Yamada handled cinematography. Shin Inoie produced the anime's special effects. Yoshitaka Koyama composed the series music, while Toru Noguchi produced sound effects under the direction of Toshiharu Yamada. The short was edited by Hidemi Li, and Dan Kanemitsu translated it for the English subtitles.

In March 2016, NHK revealed plans to adapt one of the Animator Expo shorts into a television special, but did not reveal which one. In August 2016, the Animator Expo website revealed that the short to be adapted would be The Dragon Dentist, and that the adaptation would be a two-part feature-length anime special. Anno himself will serve as executive producer for the special as well as serving as sound director. Tsurumaki will return as director, while Maijō collaborates on the script with Yōji Enokido. Shuichi Iseki designs the characters for the special. Animation is produced by Khara.

== Release ==
=== ONA ===
The 8-minute long Dragon Dentist short was first shown at the Tokyo International Film Festival in October 2014, before being posted online with English subtitles on 7 November 2014. The ONA, along with the first and second seasons of the Animator Expo shorts, were removed from the series' website on 23 November 2015. Following the announcement of the TV special on 26 August 2016, the short was again made available to stream until 31 March 2017.

=== TV special ===
The first episode of the two-part special premiered on NHK's BS Premium channel on 18 February 2017, and the second episode aired on 25 February 2017. Each episode is 45 minutes long. The special aired dubbed on NHK World with the first episode airing on 17 March 2017 and the second episode airing the next day. The specials are currently available to stream on HIDIVE. Sentai Filmworks has licensed the special for home video distribution in North America.

== Reception ==
Reviewing the first two seasons of Animator Expo for Anime News Network, Kevin Cirugeda recommended the short "with reservations." He praised Tsurumaki's animation, but felt that the story overreached a little bit and attempted to fit too much content into its short runtime, writing that it showed "a glimpse of this fantasy world, but be warned that there's a larger story there that we'll never see."

Salvador GRodiles of Japanator thought that the story was "a bit weak" but had interesting visuals, and had "potential" if Maijō were to expand on it.
