= The Perfect Insider (manga) =

Japanese media franchise

- Cover of Subete ga F ni Naru novel

すべてがFになる
- Genre: Mystery
- Novel
- Written by: Hiroshi Mori
- Published by: Kodansha
- Published: April 3, 1996
- Manga
- Written by: Hiroshi Mori
- Illustrated by: Torao Asada
- Published by: Gentosha
- Magazine: Comic Birz
- Original run: March 2001 – August 2001
- Volumes: 1
- Video game
- Developer: KID
- Publisher: KID
- Genre: Visual novel
- Platform: PlayStation
- Released: JP: March 28, 2002
- Television drama
- Directed by: Hideyoshi Jōhō; Yoshinori Kobayashi; Hisao Ogura
- Produced by: Hisao Ogura; Yoshinori Kobayashi
- Written by: Shōta Koyama; Tsutomu Kuroiwa
- Music by: Kenji Kawai
- Studio: Fuji Television; Kyodo Television
- Original network: FNS (Fuji TV)
- Original run: October 21, 2014 – December 23, 2014
- Episodes: 10
- Manga
- Written by: Hiroshi Mori
- Illustrated by: Kairi Shimotsuki
- Published by: Kodansha
- Magazine: Aria
- Original run: May 28, 2015 – January 28, 2016
- Volumes: 2
- Anime television series
- Directed by: Mamoru Kanbe
- Produced by: Yuka Okayasu; Shōki Niwa
- Written by: Toshiya Ōno
- Music by: Kenji Kawai
- Studio: A-1 Pictures
- Licensed by: AUS: Hanabee; NA: Sentai Filmworks; UK: Animatsu Entertainment
- Original network: Fuji TV, Kansai TV (Noitamina)
- English network: SEA: Aniplus Asia
- Original run: October 8, 2015 – December 17, 2015
- Episodes: 11

Subete ga F ni Naru (すべてがFになる; lit. "Everything Becomes F") also known as The Perfect Insider is a Japanese 1996 mystery novel by Hiroshi Mori. It has been adapted into a manga, a visual novel, and a live action drama. An anime television series adaptation produced by A-1 Pictures aired from October to December 2015.

== Plot ==
Sōhei Saikawa, an associate professor of architectural engineering, and Moe Nishinosono, the daughter of his mentor, travel to a remote island. While there, the two work together to solve the murders of a prominent artificial intelligence researcher and the director of the lab located on the island.

== Characters ==
Sōhei Saikawa (犀川 創平, Saikawa Sōhei)
Voiced by: Yasuyuki Kase (anime), Shigeru Shibuya (visual novel), Actor portrayal: Gō Ayano
An associate professor of architecture at National N University. He has gained the admiration of Moe, but doesn't seem to reciprocate her feelings. He is extremely intelligent, he has detached himself from the world, and has no interest in fashion. When something intrigues him, he will spend a lot of time thinking about it and attempt to find out the objective truth. He loves coffee and cigarettes, and hates watermelon, red beans, and soybean flour.
Moe Nishinosono (西之園 萌絵, Nishinosono Moe)
Voiced by: Atsumi Tanezaki (anime), Sanae Kobayashi (visual novel), Actor portrayal: Emi Takei, Ai Uchida (young)
The daughter of Sōhei's mentor, and a first year student in the architecture department of N University. She is a beautiful young woman from a high-class family. She has excellent insight, powers of observation, and calculation skills, but sometimes her thoughts jump to extreme conclusions. She loves mystery novels and the sound of car engines. She hates dried shiitake mushrooms, but because she believes they are good for anemia, she enduringly eats them every day.
Shiki Magata (真賀田 四季, Magata Shiki)
Voiced by: Ibuki Kido (anime), Satomi Kōrogi (visual novel), Actor portrayal: Akari Hayami
A genius programmer who was accused of killing her parents when she was 14, but she was found innocent due to her psychological condition. She lived in isolation at a private research lab on a remote island. Its eventually revealed that she had gotten pregnant by her uncle, giving birth to Miki and had planned to kill herself and Shindō. She intended to force Miki to take her identity but the plan had a toll on Miki; whom eventually killed herself. Shiki assumed her identity and eventually killed Shindō herself. Its never explained if its due to her "multiple" personalities or lack of empathy, but Shiki shows no qualms with killing and has little grievances. Though her new personalities might be her own way of showing the effects of her actions.
Seiji Shindō (新藤 清二, Shindō Seiji)
Voiced by: Shunsuke Sakuya (anime), Ken Yamaguchi (visual novel), Actor portrayal: Norimasa Fuke
The head of the Magata Research Institute. He is Shiki's uncle. His hobby is to fly helicopters. It is revealed that he had an affair with his underage niece, which is most likely what fueled her to murder her parents.
Yumiko Shindō (新藤 裕見子, Shindō Yumiko)
Voiced by: Sayaka Kobayashi (anime), Actor portrayal: Kumiko Fujiyoshi
Seiji's wife. She knew Shiki in her early childhood. Her speciality is making sweets.
Yukihiro Yamane (山根 幸宏, Yamane Yukihiro)
Voiced by: Tatsuhisa Suzuki (anime), Takashi Yoshida (visual novel), Actor portrayal: Go Riju
The assistant head of the Magata Research Institute.
Tomihiko Yuminaga (弓永 富彦, Yuminaga Tomihiko)
Voiced by: Bin Sasaki (anime), Toshihiro Shigetsuka (visual novel), Actor portrayal: Yasuto Kosuda
The resident doctor at the Magata Research Institute.
Chikara Mizutani (水谷 主税, Mizutani Chikara)
Voiced by: Kentarō Itō (anime)
An employee at the Magata Research Institute who is one of the few who has been at the institute since its establishment.
Ayako Shimada (島田 綾子, Shimada Ayako)
Voiced by: Yoko Hikasa (anime)
An employee at the Magata Research Institute. She is a programmer.
Toshiki Mochizuki (望月 俊樹, Mochizuki Toshiki)
Voiced by: Hiroshi Shimozaki (anime)
A security guard at the Magata Research Institute.
Satoshi Hasebe (長谷部 聡, Hasebe Satoshi)
Voiced by: Atsushi Imaruoka (anime)
A security guard at the Magata Research Institute. His hobby is playing the marimba.
Miki Magata (真賀田 未来, Magata Miki)
Voiced by: Yuko Kaida (anime)
Shiki's younger sister. She lives with a relative in America. Near the end its revealed that Miki killed herself due to her "sister"'s plans taking a toll. Furthermore she's revealed to be her daughter as a product of the affair with her uncle Shindō. After her death, Shiki assumed her identity.
Momoko Kunieda (国枝 桃子, Kunieda Momoko)
Voiced by: Houko Kuwashima (anime), Actor portrayal: Erena Mizusawa
An architecture student at N University. She assists Sōhei Saikawa with his accounts. Since she has an androgynous look and also has a very straightforward way of speaking, the other students are afraid of her.
Fukashi Hamanaka (浜中 深志, Hamanaka Fukashi)
Voiced by: Taishi Murata (anime)
A student at N University who works in Sōhei's lab. He is in charge of planning the seminar trip, and finds himself camping on Himaka island, where the Magata Research Institute is located.
Setsuko Gidō (儀同 世津子, Gidō Setsuko)
Voiced by: Yui Horie (anime)
A beautiful fair-skinned woman who is a magazine reporter. She has a close relationship with Sōhei, so she knows about his dislike of red beans and calls him "Sōhei-kun."
Suwano (諏訪野)
Voiced by: Katsumi Chō (anime)
A butler who has served the Nishinosono family for many years. He looks after Moe's everyday needs.

== Media ==
=== Novel ===
It won the Mephisto Prize for unpublished genre fiction novels and was published by Kodansha. It is the first volume of the S&M (Professor Saikawa and his student Moe) series. Nine additional volumes were published between 1996 and 1998. There are some short stories belonging to the S&M series. Two of those, "The Rooftop Ornaments of Stone Ratha" and "Which Is the Witch?", were translated into English and published by the BBB.

=== Manga ===
A manga adaptation drawn by Torao Asada was serialized in Gentosha's Comic Birz magazine in 2001.

A manga adaptation illustrated by Kairi Shimotsuki was serialized in Kodansha's Aria magazine from May 28, 2015, to January 28, 2016.

=== Video game ===
A PlayStation visual novel adaptation was developed by KID and released in March 2002.

=== Live action ===
A 10-episode drama television series adaptation aired between October and December 2014. The drama series stars Gou Ayano as Sohei Saikawa and Emi Takei as Moe Nishinosono. Although the series is titled The Perfect Insider, it is a collection of Saikawa and Moe stories.

No.	Title	Original release date
1–2	"Doctors in an Isolated Room" "Tsumetai misshitsu to hakase-tachi" (冷たい密室と博士たち)	TBA
Two post-doc students are murdered at Jinnan University's Low Temperature Research Center.
3–4	"Who Inside" "Fūin saido" (封印再度)	TBA
Fifty years after his father's apparent suicide in his workshop, a Buddhist painter is murdered in the same workshop and his body subsequently disappears.
5–6	"Everything Becomes F" "Subete ga F ni Naru" (すべてがFになる)	TBA
At the Magata Research Institute on an isolated island, a prominent artificial intelligence researcher and the director are murdered.
7–8	"Numerical Models" "Sūki ni shite mokei" (数奇にして模型)	TBA
A cosplay model is murdered at an exhibition hall and a researcher is murdered in her lab at the Keihin Institute of Technology not far away.
9–10	"The Perfect Outsider" "Yūgen to bishō no pan" (有限と微小のパン)	TBA
Two employees at Nanocraft, a software company located in a European theme park, are murdered, and the body of the first victim disappears.

=== Anime ===
An anime television series adaptation, directed by Mamoru Kanbe, written by Toshiya Ono, and produced by A-1 Pictures, premiered on Fuji TV's Noitamina programming block on October 9, 2015. The opening theme is "Talking" by Kana-Boon and the ending theme is "Nana Hitsuji" (ナナヒツジ) by Scenarioart. The series was simulcast by Crunchyroll and licensed in North America by Sentai Filmworks.

No.	Title (Note: All English titles are taken by Crunchyroll.)	Original release date
1	"White Meeting" "Shiroi Deai" (白い面会)	October 9, 2015
Moe Nishinosono interviews Shiki Magata, who secludes herself in the lab established by her parents on Himaka island, via video conference. They both manage to ask questions which made each other perplexed and thought provoken. At Sōhei Saikawa's office, Nishinosono meets Setsuko Gidō, whose familiarity with Saikawa annoys Nishinosono. Nishinosono later tells Saikawa, Momoko Kunieda, and Fukashi Hamanaka about the interview with Magata. Afterward, intending to meet Magata again, she suggests the campground on Himakajima island for Saikawa's upcoming seminar group trip.
2	"Azure Encounter" "Aoiro no Kaikō" (蒼色の邂逅)	October 16, 2015
En route to the island, Yukihiro Yamane tells Saikawa and Nishinosono that Magata has not interacted with other people except via video conference for the 15 years since she murdered her parents. When they visit the lab, the AI named Deborah that runs the lab's physical facilities malfunctions, and an automated cart transports a wedding-dress-clad object on a cart out of the suite, which is discovered to be Magata's corpse. In a flashback to when Magata was 13 years old, she begins a sexual affair with Seiji Shindō, her uncle and director of the lab. It is noted despite her young age, she possess incredible wisdom and is able to have a great understanding of how people feel and what they want.
3	"Red Magic" "Akai Mahō" (赤い魔法)	October 23, 2015
Tomihiko Yuminaga declares Magata's death a murder, since her arms and legs have been amputated. With outside communication mysteriously cut off, the lab personnel wait for Shindō, who left to retrieve Magata's sister Miki, to return in order to use the radio in his helicopter to contact the police. Meanwhile, Saikawa and Nishinosono review the video surveillance footage of the outside of Magata's room and verify that no one else emerged from her suite. Shindō returns with Miki, but he is later discovered murdered in his helicopter. The murder itself is done in a very brutal way which require the murderer to approach the director and have his guard down.
4	"Rainbow-Colored Past" "Nijiiro no Kako" (虹色の過去)	October 30, 2015
The helicopter's radio has been smashed, apparently before Shindō could use it. Computer records show that no one accessed the roof between the time when Shindō and Miki arrived and when Shindō was found dead. Saikawa, Nishinosono, Yamane, and the lab security guards enter Magata's suite and discover a small robot in the bedroom. The robot's only physical capability, other than basic mobility, is to lock and to unlock the bedroom door. The robot's name is Michiru, the same as Magata's favorite doll. Her suite is filled with a variety of toys like blocks, deflated balloons and a stuffed bear. Curiously also a sewing machine.
5	"Silver Hope" "Gin'iro no Kibō" (銀色の希望)	November 6, 2015
In a flashback, Shindō tells Magata that his dream is to live a self-sufficient life in the mountains, equipped with only a knife. His widow Yumiko Shindō recalls for Saikawa and Nishinosono that the last words of Magata's father were "I won't let you do this." Yamane learns that Magata had scheduled an interview with a journalist for two days hence, so the lab will have another opportunity for outside communication. In another flashback, Magata buys a hunting knife and presents it to Shindō for his birthday as they have dinner with her parents.
6	"Crimson Resolve" "Shinku no Ketsui" (真紅の決意)	November 13, 2015
Saikawa and Nishinosono return to the campground the next morning and tell the group about the murders. In the evening, they return to the lab. Nishinosono notices upon reviewing the surveillance video again that, when the cart emerged from Magata's suite, the elevator went from the basement to the roof. In a continuation of the dinner flashback, Magata uses the knife to kill her mother, and Shindō and Magata kill Magata's father as Yumiko arrives.
7	"Gray Boundary" "Haiiro no Kyōkai" (灰色の境界)	November 20, 2015
Ayako Shimada takes Nishinosono to the lab's entertainment center, where they spend time in isolation tanks. Meanwhile, Saikawa interviews Miki, but she has no idea why anyone would kill Magata or Shindō. During Nishinosono's isolation-induced hallucinations, she has a conversation with Magata about the plane crash that killed her parents. In a continuation of the dinner flashback, Magata tells Shindō that the story they'll tell is that Magata killed both her parents and that Shindō tried to stop her. She tells him she's certain they will be killed one day and until that day comes they should live righteously.
8	"Purple Dawn" "Murasakiiro no Yoake" (紫色の夜明け)	November 27, 2015
Shimada checks the computer records and notices that someone named Michiru accessed the isolation tank system while she and Nishonosono were in the tanks. Shimada and Saikawa think someone may have pieced together audio clips to impersonate Magata. Yamane switches the lab's computer systems from Red Magic, the lab's proprietary operating system, to UNIX in an attempt to end the computer malfunctions. External communication is restored, and Nishinosono calls her butler, telling him to call the police.
9	"Yellow Blind Spot" "Kiiro no Shikaku" (黄色の死角)	December 4, 2015
The boat arrives the next morning, bringing the journalist, Setsuko Gidō, and allowing the seminar group to leave. The prefectural police also arrive. Saikawa and Nishonosono deduce that Magata entered her suite 15 years ago pregnant and had a daughter there. They also realize that the computer malfunction reset the lab's clocks by one minute, which was hardcoded and planned to do so long ago, allowing the killer to move without video surveillance for that minute. Saikawa uses the computer to make voice contact with "Michiru" and addresses her as Shiki Magata.
10	"Aster-Colored Truth" "Shion'iro no Shinjitsu" (紫苑色の真実)	December 11, 2015
Saikawa reveals that Nishinosono didn't interview Magata originally, but her daughter. Magata's original plan was for her daughter to kill her and Shindō, then take her place. Magata had also planned the computer "malfunction" years in advance. After Nishinosono interviewed the daughter, the daughter began to question the plan and her own identity and killed herself instead. Magata left her suite, pretending to be Miki, her alleged sister who never really existed, during the initial "malfunction", killed Shindō, and left the island along with the members of Saikawa's seminar group.
11	"Colorless Weekend" "Mushoku no Shūmatsu" (無色の週末)	December 18, 2015
Magata visits Saikawa at the university. She says that she won't turn herself in, because she might not be sentenced to death. She also won't commit suicide, because she wants someone else to kill her. As she leaves, she is surrounded by what appear to be the police guard following Saikawa, but Nishinosono later informs Saikawa that the guard had been called off earlier. Saikawa reveals to Nishinosono that Gidō is his little sister. In a flashback, Magata and her daughter discuss the nature of humans and relationships. Emphasizing on the importance to continually to seek answers. In the final scene, Magata introduces her new personalities, her daughter Michiru and her uncle Shindō to Kishio, the personality based on her dead twin brother.

== See also ==
- Tozai Mystery Best 100
- Locked-room mystery
