= Hiroshi Mori (writer) =

Japanese writer and engineer (born 1957)

- Born: December 7, 1957 (age 68); Aichi Prefecture, Japan
- Occupation: Novelist
- Writing career
- Language: Japanese
- Period: 1996–present
- Genres: Fiction, mystery fiction, science fiction
- Notable works: Subete ga F ni Naru, The Sky Crawlers
- Notable awards: Mephisto Prize (1996)
- Website: www.ne.jp/asahi/beat/non/mori/

Hiroshi Mori (森 博嗣, Mori Hiroshi; born December 7, 1957) is a Japanese writer and engineer. He is known for writing mystery novels – particularly his debut work The Perfect Insider, which won him the first Mephisto Prize in 1996 – but he considers himself to be a researcher as well as a craftsman.

He writes his name as "MORI Hiroshi," family name first and uppercased, regardless of the language when romanized.

== Biography ==
=== Mori as a Craftsman ===
Since childhood, Mori has been an avid model craftsman, making all kinds of models from race cars to locomotives to airplanes. He started out with a model locomotive that his father bought him as a birthday gift and was soon attracted to the process of making a miniature world of his own. Tools and materials for model-making were readily available since his father ran a construction shop, and when Mori was in fifth grade, he built a man-powered car by putting two bicycles together.

Unlike most boys, Mori never grew out of this hobby; instead, his love for model crafts grew stronger as he became older. His interest moved on to radio control airplanes, and he has so far constructed and flown over forty of them, some of which span about ten feet. Furthermore, he recently constructed a five-inch (127 mm) gauge railway in his garden. Mori confesses that one of the reasons for becoming a novelist was that he wanted to make more money to extend the miniature garden railway.

=== Mori as a Manga Artist ===
Starting from his high school years, Mori was also engrossed in manga. When he was hospitalized in the second year of high school, he came across a work by Moto Hagio, author of several well-known shōjo manga series, which struck him deeply and made him realize the artistic beauty of manga. Indeed, Mori says that Hagio is the only artist whom he adores and that she was the one who inspired him to write not only manga but other literary works as well.

After joining a manga club at university, Mori began to write and self-publish under the pen name Mori Muku. He also produced drawings and illustrations, and it was in the second year of university that he met Subaru Sasaki, an amateur artist with the same interests, who became both his wife and professional illustrator. Although Mori does not write manga anymore, he still claims to be a better manga artist than a novelist.

=== Mori as a Researcher ===
Mori's true career started in 1982 when he became an assistant professor at Mie University. He found interest in conducting research while studying as a graduate student at Nagoya University, and upon completing his masters thesis, he took a job at the newly established Department of Architecture at Mie University. There, he specialized in rheology (a branch of physics that deals with deformation and flow of matter), and in particular, the studies of viscous-plastics.

In 1989, Mori became an associate professor at Nagoya University at the age of 31. He received a Doctorate of Engineering with a thesis on a numerical method for analyzing the flow of viscous plastic. Mori preferred not to become further promoted to professor, stating that he would lose his valuable research time to trivial meetings and other business. In March 2005, he resigned his post to become a professional writer.

=== Mori as a Novelist ===
Mori made his debut as a novelist in April 1996 with The Perfect Insider. He won the very first Mephisto Prize for this, or rather, Editor Karaki says that the prize was established in the first place to make Mori's debut sensational. At this point, he had already written three other novels. The first work he completed was Doctors in the Isolated Room rather than The Perfect Insider, which was supposed to be the fourth book in the series. The editor in chief, Hideo Uyama, decided to publish The Perfect Insider first since it was the most shocking of the four.

Mori gives several reasons, in various interviews, as to why he started to write while working as an associate professor. One of the reasons was that he had been saying jokingly that he would become a writer by forty, and another, already mentioned above, was that he wanted to have another source of income for his hobbies. However, the direct cause was that Mori simply wanted to impress his daughter who was a big fan of mystery novels.

As a writer, Mori is known among his editors for being prolific and punctual. He finished his first novel in just a week by sparing a mere three hours at night after a day's work at the university. Although he writes very fast, he admits that he is not a good reader, and, curiously, the bulk of his time is spent reading proof sheets rather than actually writing. At the same time, Mori is extremely punctual, and his editor, Misa Inako, affirms that he has never missed a deadline.

Mori has so far produced over thirty mystery novels; moreover, he has worked on a wide variety of genres in the past few years, including romance, poetry, essays, photo books, and children's picture books. Particularly notable is An Automaton in Long Sleep, an adventure book about an automaton from 120 years ago, which was written in commission by Coca-Cola for the base story of its 120th anniversary television drama in Japan. It became Mori's first work to be dramatized on television. Manga versions for some of his works have been published as well.

== Criticism ==
Mori's writings are called "rikei mystery," which roughly translates into "science mystery." This is most likely because Mori uses his experience as a research scientist and weaves some kind of science- or math-related problem into the story (for example, several math puzzles were presented in Mathematical Goodbye). However, Mori says that he is reluctant to label his novels that way, and he goes on to question what is really meant when people say "science".

In addition, Mori's works, especially The Perfect Insider, are often criticized for the overuse of computer jargon. He responds that it is perfectly natural for people with some background knowledge to have a better understanding than others. According to Mori, computer jargon is not much different from proper nouns, like the names of celebrities or fashion brands, in the sense that they are in most cases ornaments that serve to create a particular mood.

== Translated works ==
=== English translation ===
- Seven Stories, trans. Ryusui Seiryoin (The BBB: Breakthrough Bandwagon Books, 2016, ISBN 978-1-329-96799-1)
  - S&M (Professor Saikawa and his student Moe) short stories
    - "The Rooftop Ornaments of Stone Ratha" (original title: Sekitō no Yane Kazari)
    - "Which Is the Witch?" (original title: Dochiraka ga Majo)
  - Other mystery short stories
    - "The Girl Who Was the Little Bird" (original title: Kotori no Ongaeshi)
    - "A Pair of Hearts" (original title: Katahō no Piasu)
    - "I'm in Debt to Akiko" (original title: Boku wa Akiko ni Kari ga Aru)
    - "Silent Prayer in Empty" (original title: Kokū no Mokutōsha)
    - "Kappa" (original title: Kappa)
- The Sky Crawlers, trans. Ryusui Seiryoin (The BBB: Breakthrough Bandwagon Books)
  - The Sky Crawlers (February 2017, ISBN 978-1-365-22652-6)
  - None But Air (February 2018, ISBN 978-1-387-63012-7)
  - Down to Heaven (March 2019, ISBN 978-0-359-47505-6)
  - Flutter Into Life (February 2020, ISBN 978-1-6781-8066-9)
  - Cradle the Sky (February 2021, ISBN 978-1-6780-9368-6)
  - Sky Eclipse (February 2022, ISBN 978-1-4583-7876-7)
- S&M Series
  - The Perfect Insider (February 2023, ISBN 978-1-312-90341-8)
  - Doctors in the Isolated Room (March 2024, ISBN 978-1-304-50726-6)
  - Mathematical Goodbye (February 2025, ISBN 978-1-3005-2686-5)

=== French translation ===
- The Sky Crawlers series
  - The Sky Crawlers (Glénat, 2010, ISBN 2-7234-7814-9)
  - None But Air (Glénat, 2011, ISBN 2-7234-8004-6)

== Bibliography ==
- S&M series
  - The Perfect Insider (すべてがFになる, Subete ga F ni Naru)
  - Doctors in Isolated Room (冷たい密室と博士たち, Tsumetai misshitsu to hakase tachi)
  - Mathematical Goodbye (笑わない数学者, Warawanai sūgakusha)
  - Jack the Poetical Private (私的詩的ジャック, Shiteki shiteki Jack)
  - Who Inside (封印再度, Fūin saido)
  - Illusion Acts Like Magic (幻惑の死と使途, Genwaku no shi to shito)
  - Replaceable Summer (夏のレプリカ, Natsu no replica)
  - Switch Back (今はもうない, Ima wa mō nai)
  - Numerical Models (数奇にして模型, Sūki ni shite mokei)
  - The Perfect Outsider (有限と微小のパン, Yūgen to bishō no pan)
- V series
  - Delta in the Darkness (黒猫の三角, Kuroneko no sankaku)
  - Shape of Things Human (人形式モナリザ, Ningyō shiki Monna Lisa)
  - The Sound Walks When the Moon Talks (月は幽咽のデバイス, Tsuki wa yūetsu no device)
  - You May Die in My Show (夢・出会い・魔性, Yume deai mashō)
  - Cockpit on Knife Edge (魔剣天翔, Maken Tenshō)
  - A Sea of Deceits (恋恋蓮歩の演習, Ren ren renpo no enshū)
  - Six Supersonic Scientists (六人の超音波科学者, Rokunin no chōonpa kagakusha)
  - The Riddle in Torsional Nest (捩れ屋敷の利鈍, Nejire yashiki no ridon)
  - Rot off and Drop away (朽ちる散る落ちる, Kuchiru chiru ochiru)
  - Red Green Black and White (赤緑黒白, Aka midori kuro shiro)
- Hundred years series
  - God Save the Queen (女王の百年密室, Joou no hyakunen misshitsu)
  - Labyrinth in Arm of Morpheus (迷宮百年の睡魔, Meikyū hyakunen no suima)
  - Lady Scarlet Eyes and Her Deliquescence (赤目姫の潮解, akame hime no chokai)
- Four Seasons
  - The Four Seasons Green Spring (四季 春, Shiki haru)
  - The Four Seasons Red Summer (四季 夏, Shiki natsu)
  - The Four Seasons White Autumn (四季 秋, Shiki aki)
  - The Four Seasons Black Winter (四季 冬, Shiki fuyu)
- G series
  - Path connected φ broke (φは壊れたね, φ wa kowaretane)
  - Another playmate θ (θは遊んでくれたよ, θ wa asonde kuretayo)
  - Please stay until τ (τになるまで待って, τ ni naru made matte)
  - Swearing on solemn ε (εに誓って, ε ni chikatte)
  - λ has no teeth (λに歯がない, λ ni ha ga nai)
  - Dreamily in spite of η (ηなのに夢のよう, η nanoni yume no yō)
- The Sky Crawlers series
  - The Sky Crawlers (スカイ・クロラ, Sukai kurora)
  - None But Air (ナ・バ・テア, Na ba tea)
  - Down to Heaven (ダウン・ツ・ヘヴン, Daun tsu hevun)
  - Flutter into Life (フラッタ・リンツ・ライフ, Furatta rinntsu raifu)
  - Cradle the Sky (クレィドゥ・ザ・スカイ, Kureidu za sukai)
  - Sky Eclipse (スカイ・イクリプス, Sukai ekuripusu)
- Short story collections
  - Missing under the Mistletoe (まどろみ消去, Madoromi shōkyo)
  - A Slice of Terrestrial Globe (地球儀のスライス, Chikyūgi no slice)
  - The Last Dive to Parachute Museum (今夜はパラシュート博物館へ, Kon'ya wa parachute hakubutsukan e)
  - Inverse of Void Matrix (虚空の逆マトリクス, Kokū no gyaku matrix)
  - Lettuce Fry (レタス・フライ)
- M series
  - The Ordinary of Dr. Mizukaki (工学部・水柿助教授の日常, Kougakubu Mizukaki jokyouju no nichijou)
  - The Hesitation of Dr. Mizukaki (工学部・水柿助教授の逡巡, Kougakubu Mizukaki jokyouju no shunjun)
  - The Nirvana of Dr. Mizukaki (工学部・水柿助教授の解脱, Kougakubu Mizukaki jokyouju no gedatsu)
- Z series
  - ZOKU
  - ZOKUDAM
  - ZOKURANGER
- Other novels
  - Until Death Do Us Part (そして二人だけになった, Soshite futari dakeni natta)
  - Falling Ropewalkers (墜ちていく僕たち, Ochite iku bokutachi)
  - Wife at Network (奥様はネットワーカ, Okusama ha networker)
  - His name is Earl (探偵伯爵と僕, Tantei hakushaku to boku)
  - A phenomenon among students (どきどきフェノメノン, Dokidoki phoenomenon)
  - An Automaton in Long Sleep (カクレカラクリ, Kakure karakuri)
  - Eccentric persons are in stock (少し変わった子あります, Sukoshi kawatta ko arimasu)
  - Zola with a blow and goodbye (ゾラ・一撃・さようなら, Zola ichigeki sayounara)
  - Incombustibles (もえない, Moenai)
  - Trancendence of Ginga Estate Agency (銀河不動産の超越, Ginga fudousan no chouetsu)
  - Lost heart for Thoma (*novelization) (トーマの心臓(小説版), toma no shinzou)
  - Does She Walk Alone? (彼女は一人で歩くのか？, kanojo ha hitori de arukunoka)
