= Mephisto Prize =

Japanese literary award

The Mephisto Prize (メフィスト賞, Mefisuto Shō) is a Japanese literary award for unpublished genre fiction novels, mainly for mystery novels. It was established in 1996 by the editors of Mephisto magazine and is awarded on an irregular basis. The winning work is published by Kodansha and the winner receives a statue of Sherlock Holmes.

== Winners whose works are available in English ==
Writers engaged in The BBB

The BBB is a publishing group in which some Mephisto Prize winners participate. The group was established in 2012 by Ryusui Seiryoin and other Mephisto Prize winners to translate their works into English and publish them as ebooks.

- Hiroshi Mori
- Ryusui Seiryoin (Chief Editing Officer of The BBB)
- Kenichi Sobu
- Kyosuke Tsumiki
- Takafumi Takada
- Ryosuke Akizuki
- Ryuoh Yano

Other writers

- Otaro Maijo
- Yuya Sato
- Nisio Isin

== Winners ==
	Year	Winner	Winning entry	Available in English Translation
1	1996	Hiroshi Mori	Subete ga F ni Naru (すべてがFになる)	
2	1996	Ryusui Seiryoin	Kozumikku (Cosmic) (コズミック)	
3	1997	Kenichi Sobu (ja)	Roku mai no Tonkatsu (六枚のとんかつ)	
4	1998	Kurumi Inui	J no Shinwa (Jの神話)	
5	1998	Kazuhiro Uraga (ja)	Kioku no Hate (記憶の果て)	
6	1998	Kyosuke Tsumiki (ja)	Yuganda Soseiki (歪んだ創世記)	
7	1998	Fuyuki Shindo (ja)	Chinurareta Shinwa (血塗られた神話)	
8	1998	Mitsufumi Asagure (ja)	Dabu(e)suton Kaido (ダブ（エ）ストン街道)	
9	1998	Takafumi Takada (ja)	QED Hyakunin Isshu no Shu (QED 百人一首の呪)	
10	1999	Nozomu Nakashima (ja)	K no Ryugi (Kの流儀)	
11	1999	Shina Takasato (ja)	Gin no Ori o Tokashite (銀の檻を溶かして)	
12	1999	Takumi Kirisha (ja)	Dopperugenga (Doppelgänger) Kyu (ドッペルゲンガー宮)	
13	1999	Masayuki Shuno (ja)	Hasami Otoko (ハサミ男)	
14	2000	Seiji Kodokoro (ja)	Announ [Unknown] (アンノウン)	
15	2000	Toru Hikawa (ja)	Makkura na Yoake (真っ暗な夜明け)	
16	2000	Kenji Kuroda (ja)	Wedingu Doresu [Wedding Dress] (ウェディング・ドレス)	
17	2000	Kaju Koizumi (ja)	Higa (火蛾)	
18	2000	Koji Ishizaki (ja)	Nichiyobi no Chinmoku (日曜日の沈黙)	
19	2001	Otaro Maijo	Kemuri ka Tsuchi ka Kuimono (煙か土か食い物 Smoke, Soil or Sacrifices)	
20	2001	Ryosuke Akizuki (ja)	Getchoseki no Maken (月長石の魔犬)	
21	2001	Yuya Sato	Furikka (Flicker) Shiki (フリッカー式)	
22	2001	Takumi Tsumura (ja)	Doomsday (DOOMSDAY)	
23	2002	Nisio Isin	Kubikiri Saikuru (クビキリサイクル)	Zaregoto, Book 1: The Kubikiri Cycle
24	2002	Takekuni Kitayama (ja)	Kurokku [Clock] Jo Satsujin Jiken (『クロック城』殺人事件)	
25	2002	Megumi Tachimori (ja)	Sore de mo Keikan wa Warau (それでも警官は微笑う)	
26	2002	Akira Ishiguro (ja)	Shito Nippon (死都日本)	
27	2003	Shintaro Ikegaki (ja)	Furemu Auto [Flame-Out] (フレームアウト)	
28	2003	Namida Sekita (ja)	Mitsu no Mori no Kogoeru Megami (蜜の森の凍える女神)	
29	2003	Yukiya Shoji (ja)	Sora o Miageru Furui Uta o Kuchizusamu (空を見上げる古い歌を口ずさむ)	
30	2004	Ryuoh Yano (ja)	Kyokugen Suiri Koroshiamu [Colosseum] (極限推理コロシアム)	
31	2004	Mizuki Tsujimura	Tsumetai Kosha no Toki wa Tomaru (冷たい校舎の時は止まる)	A School Frozen in Time
32	2005	Yukiko Mari (ja)	Kochusho (孤虫症)	
33	2005	Takeshi Moriyama (ja)	Mokka no Daisho (黙過の代償)	
34	2006	Hayato Okazaki (ja)	Shojo wa Odoru Kurai Hara no Naka Odoru (少女は踊る暗い腹の中踊る)	
35	2007	Mahoro Furuno (ja)	Tentei no Hashitanaki Kajitsu (天帝のはしたなき果実)	
36	2007	Reiichiro Fukami (ja)	Uruchimo Torukko [Ultimo Trucco] (ウルチモ・トルッコ)	
37	2008	Korumono Migiwa (ja)	Paradaisu Kurozudo [Paradise Closed] (パラダイス・クローズド)	
38	2008	Sosuke Watari (ja)	Horiwari de Warau Onna (掘割で笑う女)	
39	2008	Yushin Jiro (ja)	Mane Rodo [Money Road] (マネーロード)	
40	2009	Yamori Mochizuki (ja)	Muboden: Futago no Ko ra (無貌伝 双児の子ら)	
41	2009	Koichiro Akahoshi (ja)	Mushitori no Uta (虫とりのうた)	
42	2009	Mito Shirakawa (ja)	Puru [Pool] no Soko ni Nemuru (プールの底に眠る)	
43	2010	Ryo Amane (ja)	Kyokankaku (キョウカンカク)	
44	2010	Tenju Maruyama (ja)	Roya no Oni (琅邪の鬼)	
45	2010	Daisuke Takada (ja)	Toshokan no Majo (図書館の魔女)	
46	2012	Natsuki Kita (ja)	Koto no Kitsune-san (恋都の狐さん)	
47	2013	Ritsu Shuki (ja)	Gankyudo no Satsujin (眼球堂の殺人)	
48	2013	Yoichi Chikamoto (ja)	Ai no Shirushi Tengoku no Hogaku (愛の徴 天国の方角)	
49	2013	Sho Kazamori (ja)	Uzumaku Kairo no Rekuiemu [Requiem] (渦巻く回廊の鎮魂曲)	
50	2014	Yabusaka Hayasaka (ja)	Marumarumarumarumarumarumarumaru Satsujin Jiken (○○○○○○○○殺人事件)	
51	2015	Magi Inoue (ja)	Koi to Kinki no Purediketto [Predicate] (恋と禁忌の述語論理)	
52	2017	Mafuyu Miyanishi (ja)	Dare ka ga Miteiru (誰かが見ている)	
53	2017	Masamune Masaki (ja)	No Suiri, No Tantei? (NO推理、NO探偵？)	
54	2017	Takumi Mochizuki	Maitoshi, Kioku o Ushinau Kanojo no Sukuikata (毎年、記憶を失う彼女の救いかた)	
55	2018	Kanata Kimoto	Enmadōsara no Suirikitan (閻魔堂沙羅の推理奇譚)	
56	2018	Suika Akiu	Konbini nashi de wa Ikirarenai (コンビニなしでは生きられない)	
57	2018	Izumi Kurosawa (ja)	Ningen ni Muite nai (人間に向いてない)	
58	2018	Amu Nagura (ja)	Isekai-kei (異セカイ系)	
59	2019	Hiromasa Togami (ja)	Sen wa, Boku o Kaku (線は、僕を描く)	
60	2020	Mikoto Mashita (ja)	#YuriaToKakurenbo (#柚莉愛とかくれんぼ)	
62	2020	Ritsuto Igarashi (ja)	Hōtei Yūgi (法廷遊戯)	
63	2021	Ken Shiotani (ja)	Suicchi [Switch] Akui no Jikken (スイッチ 悪意の実験)	
64	2023	Kotori Sudō (ja)	Gorira [Gorilla] Saiban no Hi (ゴリラ裁判の日)	
65	2024	Reisuke Kaneko (ja)	Shinda Yamada to Kyōshitsu (死んだ山田と教室)	

== Mephisto (magazine) ==
Mephisto (メフィスト) is a Japanese literary magazine of genre fiction, mainly of mystery fiction. It has been published triannually by Kodansha since April 1994.

Koji Suzuki's Promenade of the Gods was serialized in the magazine from 1995 to 2002. The first three stories of Nisio Isin's Monogatari series were published in the magazine in 2005-2006.

Short stories available in English translation which were originally published in Mephisto magazine

- Hiroshi Mori
  - "The Girl Who Was the Little Bird" (December 1997 issue)
  - "A Pair of Hearts" (October 1998 issue)
  - "Which Is the Witch?" (September 1999 issue)
- Rintaro Norizuki
  - "An Urban Legend Puzzle" (September 2001 issue)
- Soji Shimada
  - "The Locked House of Pythagoras" (September 1999 issue)
- Takafumi Takada
  - "Three Little Bonzes: The Case Diary of Chinami Chiba" (September 2000 issue)
  - "A Goat on a Boat to Float: The Case Diary of Chinami Chiba" (September 2002 issue)

Contributors

- Jiro Akagawa
- Taku Ashibe
- Yukito Ayatsuji
- Keigo Higashino
- Kouhei Kadono
- Shinji Kajio
- Hideyuki Kikuchi
- Natsuhiko Kyogoku
- Otaro Maijo
- Hiroshi Mori
- Kyotaro Nishimura
- Nisio Isin
- Rintaro Norizuki
- Fuyumi Ono
- Yuya Sato
- Ryusui Seiryoin
- Soji Shimada
- Koji Suzuki
- Katsuhiko Takahashi
- Masaki Yamada

== See also ==
Japanese mystery awards for unpublished novels

- Edogawa Rampo Prize
- Ayukawa Tetsuya Award
- Agatha Christie Award

Japanese mystery awards for best works published in the previous year

- Mystery Writers of Japan Award
- Honkaku Mystery Award
