= Ōtarō Maijō =

Japanese writer (born 1973)

- Born: 1973 (age 52–53); Fukui Prefecture, Japan
- Occupations: Novelist, short-story writer, translator
- Writing career
- Language: Japanese
- Period: 2001–present
- Genres: Fiction, crime fiction, thriller
- Notable awards: Mephisto Prize (2001); Mishima Prize (2003)

Ōtarō Maijō (舞城 王太郎, Maijō Ōtarō; born 1973) is a Japanese novelist from Fukui Prefecture. He won the 19th Mephisto Prize for Smoke, Soil, or Sacrifices, and the 16th Mishima Yukio Prize for Asura Girl. His short story, "Drill Hole in the Brain" was translated into English as part of Del Rey's Faust anthology, and described by the Anime News Network as the "crowning glory" of the anthology.

== Style ==
Many of Maijō's novels are set in Fukui and make extensive use of that dialect. He is known for an aggressive, colloquial writing style. His early works were mystery novels, but he has branched out into literary magazines. He illustrates much of his own work, and has contributed several brief manga to Faust.

== Works in English translation ==
Novel

- Asura Girl, trans. Stephen Snyder (Haikasoru, 2014)

Short story

- "Drill Hole in the Brain" (Faust 1. Del Rey, 2008. ISBN 034550206X)

== Awards and nominations ==
- 2001 – Mephisto Prize: Kemuri ka Tsuchi ka Kuimono (Smoke, Soil or Sacrifices) (Novel)
- 2003 – Mishima Yukio Prize: Asura Girl (Novel)
- 2003 – Nominee for Mystery Writers of Japan Award for Best Short Story: "Pikōn!"
- 2004 – Nominee for Akutagawa Prize: Suki Suki Daisuki Cho Ai shiteru (Love Love Love You, I Love You) (Novella)
- 2009 – Nominee for Akutagawa Prize: Bitch Magnet (Novella)
- 2012 – Nominee for Akutagawa Prize: Tanpen Gobosei (Short-Story Pentagram) (Five short stories)
- 2013 – Nominee for Akutagawa Prize: "Oishii Shawa Heddo" (Dainty Shower Head) (Short story)

== Works ==
=== Novels ===
- Smoke, Soil or Sacrifices (Kemuri ka Tsuchi ka Kuimono) 2001 (Kodansha novels), 2004 (bunko)
- The Childish Darkness (Kurayami no Naka de Kodomo) 2001 (Kodansha novels)
- The World is Made Out of Closed Rooms (Sekai wa Misshitsu de Dekiteiru) 2001 (Kodansha novels), 2005 (bunko)
- an Asura-Girl in Love (Ashura Gāru), 2003 (Shinchosha), 2005 (bunko)
  - "Kawa wo Oyoide Wataru Hebi" (short story, appeared in Shincho Magazine 2003, appeared only in the bunko edition of an Asura-Girl in Love)
- Tsukumo Juku, 2005 (Kodansha novels), 2007 (bunko)
  - Set in the world of Ryusui Seiryoin's JDC novels
- Yama n Naka no Shimitomo Naruo, 2003 (Kodansha), 2005 (Kodansha novels), 2007 (bunko)
  - Originally appeared in Gunzou, July 2003
- Love Love Love You I Love You! (Suki Suki Daisuki Cho Ai shiteru) 2004 (Kodansha), 2006 (Kodansha novels)
  - Suki Suki Daisuki Cho Ai Shiteru (Gunzou, January 2004)
  - "Drill Hole in My Brain" (Faust), 2003 vol. 1
- Speedboy, (Kodansha Box, 2006)
- Disco Detective Wednesday (2008)
- Bitch Magnet (2009)
- Kemono no Ki (2010)
- NECK (2010)
- Makai Tantei Meiosei O: Dead Doll no Double D (2010)
- JoJo's Bizarre Adventure: Jorge Joestar, (Shueisha, 2012)

=== Short story collections ===
- Kuma no Basho (short story collection; 2004 (Kodansha novels), 2006 (bunko)
  - Kuma no Basho (appeared in Gunzou magazine, September 2001)
  - Bat Otoko (Gunzou, February 2002)
  - Pikōn! (later adapted into a manga by Kei Aoyama)
- Minna Genki, 2004 (Shinchosha), 2007 (bunko - in two volumes, Minna Genki and School Attack Syndrome)
  - Minna Genki, (Shincho, September 2004)
  - Dead for Good
  - Wagaya no Totoro (Shincho, June 2003)
  - Ya wo Tomeru Gowa no Kuchinashidori (Shincho, June 2004)
  - School Attack Syndrome (Shincho, January 2004)
- Ikiru Kisu (2010)
- Tanpen Gobosei (2012)
- Kimitopia (2013)

=== Translations ===
- Thom Jones –Cold Snap (short story collection)

=== Manga ===
- PICCCCCOHHHNNN! (Illustrated by Kei Aoyama, 2007)
- Biorg Trinity (Illustrated by Oh! Great, 2012-2017)
- Spotless Love: This Love Cannot Be Any More Beautiful. (Illustrated by Arata Momose, 2019-2020)
- ID: INVADED #BRAKE BROKEN (Illustrated by Yūki Kodama, 2019-2020)
- Moonlit Gourmet ( misspelled as Moonlit groumet on the cover) (illustrated by Okunishi Chie 2018-2021)

=== Anime ===
- Giant God Warrior Appears in Tokyo (Co-Written with Hideaki Anno)
- The Dragon Dentist
- HammerHead
- ID: Invaded
- Special Kid Factory

== Real Coffee ==
Currently, Otaro Maijo is part of the Real Coffee Project, which, according to their website, is attempting to inspire new and better Japanese movies. Maijo has written and illustrated a number of flash movies, which are hosted on the website.
