= Ryūsui Seiryōin =

Japanese novelist (born 1974)

- Born: Hidetaka Kanai (金井 英貴); 9 August 1974 (age 52); Nishinomiya, Hyōgo, Japan
- Occupations: Writer, translator (from Japanese into English)
- Writing career
- Language: Japanese
- Period: 1996–present
- Genres: Fiction, mystery
- Notable awards: Mephisto Prize (1996)

Ryūsui Seiryōin (清涼院 流水, Seiryōin Ryūsui; born August 9, 1974) is a Japanese novelist, active in mystery and various other fields. He was born in 1974, in Hyōgo Prefecture, Japan. He won the 2nd Mephisto Prize in 1996 while in Kyoto University, and started to work as a novelist. After that, Ryusui published over 60 novels. His works are always controversial. The JDC (Japan Detectives Club) series has inspired tribute novels by authors like Ōtarō Maijō and Nisio Isin.

In 2007, he achieved the publication of the series, "What a perfect world!", for 12 consecutive months. In the same year, he carried out "Doumo tour", the autograph sessions for 12 consecutive months held in Japanese major cities, and made a great success.

On May 1, 2009, he launched "bbbcircle", his official website, with Kai Chamberlain, a Canadian cartoonist.

== Style ==
His works defy not only the common wisdom of novels but general knowledge in the broad sense and give new values to readers. His mystery novels, particularly the JDC series, are known for genre-busting metatextual complexity.

== Works in English translation ==
- King In the Mirror: The Reflection of Michael Jackson (translated from Japanese by the author himself, The BBB: Breakthrough Bandwagon Books, 2012)

== As translator ==
Seiryoin has been working as a translator from Japanese into English since 2012.

Short mystery stories

- Hiroshi Mori
  - "The Girl Who Was the Little Bird" (The BBB: Breakthrough Bandwagon Books, 2013)
  - "A Pair of Hearts" (The BBB: Breakthrough Bandwagon Books, 2014)
  - "I'm In Debt to Akiko" (The BBB: Breakthrough Bandwagon Books, 2014)
  - "Silent Prayer In Empty" (The BBB: Breakthrough Bandwagon Books, 2015)
  - "Kappa" (The BBB: Breakthrough Bandwagon Books, 2015)
- Kenichi Sobu
  - "The Hopeless Dream" (The BBB: Breakthrough Bandwagon Books, 2012)
  - "Your Melody" (The BBB: Breakthrough Bandwagon Books, 2014)

The Gifted series by Ryosuke Akizuki

- "The Gifted Vol.3: The Skydiving Club" (The BBB: Breakthrough Bandwagon Books, 2014)
- "The Gifted Vol.4: The Phantom of Gemini" (The BBB: Breakthrough Bandwagon Books, 2015)

Urban Legend Detectives Case series by Kyosuke Tsumiki

- "Urban Legend Detectives Case 1: The Merry's Mail" (The BBB: Breakthrough Bandwagon Books, 2013)
- "Urban Legend Detectives Case 2: Solitary Hide and Seek" (The BBB: Breakthrough Bandwagon Books, 2013)
- "Urban Legend Detectives Case 3: The Kunekune (Dancing White Shadow)" (The BBB: Breakthrough Bandwagon Books, 2014)

The Case Diary of Chinami Chiba series by Takafumi Takada

- "Three Little Bonzes: The Case Diary of Chinami Chiba" (The BBB: Breakthrough Bandwagon Books, 2014)
  - a mystery short story combined with the logic puzzle, Knights and Knaves
- "A Goat on a Boat to Float: The Case Diary of Chinami Chiba" (The BBB: Breakthrough Bandwagon Books, 2015)
  - a mystery short story combined with the river crossing puzzle

The Sky Crawlers series by Hiroshi Mori

- "The Sky Crawlers" (The BBB: Breakthrough Bandwagon Books, 2017)
- "None But Air" (The BBB: Breakthrough Bandwagon Books, 2018)
- "Down To Heaven" (The BBB: Breakthrough Bandwagon Books, 2019)
- "Flutter Into Life" (The BBB: Breakthrough Bandwagon Books, 2020)
- "Cradle the Sky" (The BBB: Breakthrough Bandwagon Books, 2021)
- "Sky Eclipse" (The BBB: Breakthrough Bandwagon Books, 2022)

S&M Series by Hiroshi Mori

- "The Perfect Insider" (The BBB: Breakthrough Bandwagon Books, 2023)

Interviews

- Becoming the Best Interviewer In the World: The BBB Interview Selection, interviewee: Yohei Hayakawa (The BBB: Breakthrough Bandwagon Books, 2013)
- Kaiten-sushi Saves the World: The BBB Interview Selection, interviewee: Nobuo Yonekawa (The BBB: Breakthrough Bandwagon Books, 2013)
- Mountaineering, Photographs, and World Heritage Sites: The BBB Interview Selection, interviewee: Hiroyuki Nakada (The BBB: Breakthrough Bandwagon Books, 2014)

== Works ==
=== JDC series ===
Paperback edition

- Cosmic -Seikimatsu Tantei Shinwa- (ISBN 4061819283)
- Joker -Kyuyaku Tantei Shinwa- (ISBN 4061819461)
- Carnival Eve -Jinrui Saidai no Jiken- (December 1997, ISBN 4-06-181997-6)
- Carnival -Jinrui Saigo no Jiken- (April 1999, ISBN 4-06-182018-4)
- Carnival Day -Shinjinrui no Kinenbi- (September 1999, ISBN 4-06-182082-6)
- Saimonke Jiken Zempen -Gokujo Magic Circus- (January 2004, ISBN 978-4-06-182347-1)
- Saimonke Jiken Kouhen -Gekokujo Masterpiece- (February 2004, ISBN 978-4-06-182348-8)

Pocketbook edition

- Cosmic -Ryu- (ISBN 4062646498)
- Joker -Sei- (ISBN 4062648466)
- Joker -Ryo- (ISBN 4062648695)
- Cosmic -Sui- (ISBN 4062648687)
  - The pocketbook edition suggests you read the two volumes of "Joker" between the volumes of "Cosmic"—Sei/Ryo IN Ryu/Sui.
- Carnival -Ichirin no Hana-(January 2003, ISBN 4-06-273642-X)
- Carnival -Nirin no Kusa- (February 2003, ISBN 4-06-273663-2)
- Carnival -Sanrin no Sou- (March 2003, ISBN 4-06-273687-X)
- Carnival -Yonrin no Gyu- (April 2003, ISBN 4-06-273721-3)
- Carnival -Gorin no Sho- (May 2003, ISBN 4-06-273744-2)
- Saimonke Jiken I -Kijutsu ga Kitarite Fue wo Fuku- (April 2008, ISBN 978-4-06-275628-0)
- Saimonke Jiken II -White and Night- (February 2008, ISBN 978-4-06-275629-7)
- Saimonke Jiken III -Saimonke no Ichizoku- (May 2008, ISBN 978-4-06-276047-8)

JDC manga

- Exstra Jorker -JOE- (ISBN 4048533991)
- Exstra Jorker -KER- (ISBN 4048535137)
- Cosmic Comics -AND- (ISBN 404853646X)
- Cosmic Comics -END- (ISBN 4048537261)

JDC tribute books

- Tsukumojuku by Otaro Maijo (ISBN 406182306X)
- Double Down Kankuro by Ishin Nishio (ISBN 4061823051)
- Triple Play ScaredCraw by Ishin Nishio (ISBN 4061825380)
- Tantei Gishiki I by Eiji Otsuka and Chizu Hashii (ISBN 4047136093)
- Tantei Gishiki II by Eiji Otsuka and Chizu Hashii (ISBN 4047137103)
- Tantei Gishiki III by Eiji Otsuka and Chizu Hashii (ISBN 4047137995)
- Tantei Gishiki IV by Eiji Otsuka and Chizu Hashii (ISBN 978-4-04-713922-0)
- Tantei Gishiki V by Eiji Otsuka and Chizu Hashii (ISBN 978-4-04-715040-9)

=== Shoichi Kimura series ===
Paperback edition

- 19 Box -Shin Mystery Souseki- (ISBN 4061819674)
- L -Zennihon Janken Tournament- (ISBN 4877289267)
- U -Nihon Kokumin Zenin Sanka TV Shin Kikaku- (ISBN 4877289453)

Pocketbook edition

- W(Double) Drive In (ISBN 4062732408)
- Zennihon Janken Tournament (ISBN 4877288007)
- Okusenmannin no Ningen CM Scandal (ISBN 4344404459)

=== Top Run and Land series ===
- Top Run 1: Koko ga Saizensen (ISBN 4877288635)
- Top Run 2: Koibito ga Yukaihan (ISBN 4877288805)
- Top Run 3: Minoshirokin Loan (ISBN 4344400143)
- Top Run 4: Quiz Daigyakuten (ISBN 4344400291)
- Top Run 5: Saishuuwa ni Sennen (ISBN 4344400461)
- Top Run Final: Daikoukai wo Run (ISBN 4344400712)
- Top Land 2001: Tenshi Episode 1 (ISBN 4344401689)
- Top Land 1980: Shinshi Episode 1 (ISBN 4344402235)
- Top Land 2002: Senshi Episode 1 (ISBN 4344402871)
- Top Run and Land Kan (ISBN 4344405072)

=== Tokuma series ===
- Toku Made Yaru (ISBN 4199051481)
- Toku Matsu -Yagiritei Jiken- (ISBN 4199051503)
- Toku Maru (ISBN 4199051589)

=== What a Perfect World! series ===
Done for Kodansha Box—all twelve volumes in one year.

- What a perfect world! Book.1 ◆One Ace (ISBN 4062836106)
- What a perfect world! Book.2 ◆Two to Tango (ISBN 4062836149)
- What a perfect world! Book.3 ◆Three Cheers (ISBN 4062836181)
- What a perfect world! Book.4 ◆Four Winds (ISBN 406283622X)
- What a perfect world! Book.5 ◆Five-star (ISBN 4062836270)
- What a perfect world! Book.6 ◆Sixth Sense (ISBN 4062836300)
- What a perfect world! Book.7 ◆Seventh Heaven (ISBN 4062836327)
- What a perfect world! Book.8 ◆Figure of Eight (ISBN 4062836351)
- What a perfect world! Book.9 ◆On the Cloud Nine (ISBN 4062836386)
- What a perfect world! Book.10◆Ten Commandments (ISBN 4062836424)
- What a perfect world! Book.11◆Eleven-plus (ISBN 4062836475)
- What a perfect world! Book.12◆Perfect Twelve (ISBN 4062836513)

=== Others ===
- Himitsuya Red (ISBN 4061821792)
- Himitsuya White (ISBN 4061821806)
- Himitsuya Bunko Shitteru Kai (ISBN 4062748312)
  - including "Himitsuya Red","White" and "Himitsuya Black", newly written.
- Himisshitsu Bon (ISBN 406182290X)
- Himisshitsu Bon Quiz Show (ISBN 4062754037)
- Mystereal Chara Net (ISBN 4044285012)
- Chara Net Ai$tantei no Jikenbo (ISBN 4048735179)
- Chara Net complete edition Ai$tantei novel (ISBN 4044285020)
- Burandisshu? (ISBN 4344010701)
- Seikougaku Chara Kyoju 40million yen tokusuru hanashi (ISBN 4062836017)
- Redbook -Waltz for Rain- (ISBN 4344012666)
- Cosmic Zero -Japan Annihilation Plan- (ISBN 4163282300)
- B/W(Black or White) -The institute for perfect crimes- (ISBN 4778311779)
- Forgetting Love (ISBN 4903620603)
- King in the Mirror (ISBN 4569793037)
