= Yuya Sato (novelist) =

Japanese writer (born 1980)

- Born: 7 December 1980 (age 45); Chitose, Hokkaido, Japan
- Occupation: Writer
- Writing career
- Language: Japanese
- Period: 2001–present
- Genres: Fiction, crime fiction, thriller, science fiction
- Notable awards: Mephisto Prize (2001); Mishima Prize (2007)

Yuya Sato (佐藤友哉, Satō Yūya; born 1980) is a Japanese novelist from Hokkaido Prefecture. He won the 21st Mephisto Prize for Flicker Style, and the 20th Yukio Mishima Prize for 1000 Novels and Backbeard. His works have been translated into English, Chinese and Korean. Sato's short story "Same As Always" was translated for The Penguin Book of Japanese Short Stories (2018), and has been described as "an acerbic meditation on the complex interplay of gender and nurturing in post-Fukushima Japan."

Kenzaburō Ōe, Kenji Nakagami and especially J. D. Salinger affected Sato's style.

== Works in English translation ==
Novel

- Dendera, trans. Nathan Collins and Edwin Hawkes (Haikasoru, 2015)

Short story

- "Gray-Colored Diet Coke" (Faust 2, Del Rey, 2009)

This is a stand-alone short story and is also the first chapter of his Novel Gray-Colored Diet Coke. The title was named after Kenji Nakagami's Gray-Colored Coke.

== Awards and nominations ==
- 2001 – Mephisto Prize: Furikka Shiki (Flicker Style) (Novel)
- 2005 – Nominee for Noma Literary New Face Prize: Kodomo-tachi Okoru Okoru Okoru (Children Shout Shit! Shit! Shit!) (Short story collection)
- 2007 – Mishima Yukio Prize: Sen no Shosetsu to Bakkubeado (1000 Novels and Backbeard) (Novel)
- 2007 – Nominee for Noma Literary New Face Prize: Gray-Colored Diet Coke (Novel)

== Bibliography ==
=== Kagami family series ===
- Novels
  - Flicker Style (フリッカー式, Furikka Shiki) (Kodansha, Tokyo, 2001)
  - Specific Gravity of the Soul Coated with Enamel (エナメルを塗った魂の比重, Enameru o Nutta Tamashii no Hiju) (Kodansha, Tokyo, 2001)
  - Sunken Piano (水没ピアノ, Suibotsu Piano) (Kodansha, Tokyo, 2002)
  - Kagami Sisters in the Flying Classroom (鏡姉妹の飛ぶ教室, Kagami Shimai no Tobu Kyoshitsu) (Kodansha, Tokyo, 2005)
  - Cream Sodium Cyanide (青酸クリームソーダ, Seisan Kurimu Soda) (Kodansha, Tokyo, 2009)
- Short story collection
  - Nine Stories (ナイン・ストーリーズ, Nain Sutorizu) (Kodansha, Tokyo, 2013)
    - "A Perfect Day for Cherryfish" (チェリーフィッシュにうってつけの日) (2004)
    - "My Dear Brother Weedy" (わたしのひょろひょろおにいちゃん) (2005)
    - "Just Before the War with the Robots" (対ロボット戦争の前夜) (2005)
    - "The Mourning Man" (憂い男) (2005)
    - "Down at the Rivulet" (小川のほとりで) (2004)
    - "For Naomi—with Love in Squalor" (ナオミに捧ぐ 愛も汚辱のうちに) (2005)
    - "Pretty My Eyes and Green Mouth" (愛らしき目もと 口は緑) (2005)
    - "Cordwainer Smith's Blue Period" (コードウェイナー・スミスの青の時代) (2012)
    - "Lady" (レディ) (2005)

=== Standalone novels ===
Some of these books are not novels but collections of linked short stories.

- Christmas Terror—Invisible/Inventor (クリスマス・テロル invisible × inventor) (Kodansha, Tokyo, 2002)
- 1000 Novels and Backbeard (1000の小説とバックベアード) (Shinchosha, Tokyo, 2007)
- Gray-Colored Diet Coke (灰色のダイエットコカコーラ) (Kodansha, Tokyo, 2007)
  - Chapter 1:"Gray-Colored Diet Coke"
  - Chapter 2:"Red-Colored Moscow Mule"
  - Chapter 3:"Black-Colored Pocari Sweat"
  - Chapter 4:"Rainbow-Colored Diet Coke with Lemon"
- The End of the End of the World (世界の終わりの終わり) (Kadokawa Shoten, Tokyo, 2007)
- Dendera (デンデラ) (Shinchosha, Tokyo, 2009)
- The Top of the 333 (333のテッペン) (Shinchosha, Tokyo, 2010)
- Nocturne for the Starry Sky (星の海にむけての夜想曲) (Seikaisha, Tokyo, 2012)
- Bedside Murder Case (ベッドサイド・マーダーケース) (Shinchosha, Tokyo, 2013)
- Danganronpa Togami (ダンガンロンパ十神), (Seikaisha, Tokyo, 2015)

=== Short story collection ===
- Children Shout Shit! Shit! Shit! (子供たち怒る怒る怒る) (Shinchosha, Tokyo, 2005)
  - Little House in the Flood (大洪水の小さな家)
  - Corpse and, [...] (死体と、)
  - Urge (慾望)
  - Children Shout Shit! Shit! Shit! (子供たち怒る怒る怒る)
  - Thank you for your being born! (生まれてきてくれてありがとう!)
  - The Licca-chan Human (リカちゃん人間)

== Film adaptations ==
- Dendera (2011) directed by Daisuke Tengan, the son of Shohei Imamura
