= NHK (disambiguation) =

NHK is the Japanese public broadcasting corporation.

NHK may also refer to:

- The Collaborative Party, a Japanese political party formerly and still commonly referred to as the NHK Party
- The NHK Trophy, a figure skating competition jointly held by NHK and the Japan Skating Federation
- NHK Spring Company, a Japanese spring manufacturer
- Welcome to the N.H.K., a Japanese novel later adapted into a manga and anime series
- Nathan Homer Knorr (April 23, 1905 – June 8, 1977), third president of the Watch Tower Bible and Tract Society of Pennsylvania (Jehovah's Witnesses)
- The Dutch Reformed Church (Dutch: Nederlandse Hervormde Kerk)
  - The Nederduitsch Hervormde Kerk van Afrika, a Dutch Reformed denomination in Southern Africa
- Naval Air Station Patuxent River (IATA and FAA code NHK)
- Nucleosomal histone kinase, a protein
- Nozaki–Hiyama–Kishi reaction, a coupling reaction used in organic synthesis
