= Takimoto =

Takimoto is a Japanese surname. Notable people with the surname include:

- Fujiko Takimoto (born 1967), Japanese voice actress
- Makoto Takimoto (born 1974), Japanese judoka and mixed martial artist
- Miori Takimoto (born 1991), Japanese actress
- Tatsuhiko Takimoto (born 1978), Japanese author

== See also ==
- 5973 Takimoto, a main-belt asteroid
