= List of Ultraman R/B episodes =

This is the episode list of Ultraman R/B (ウルトラマンR/B(ルーブ), Ultraman Rūbu) a Japanese tokusatsu television series produced by Tsuburaya Productions as part of the long-running Ultraman series. The series premiered on TV Tokyo on July 7, 2018.

At the end of each episode, a minisode called R/B Crystal Navi (ルーブクリスタルナビ, Rūbu Kurisutaru Nabi) aired and featuring the Minato brothers described the R/B or Monster Crystals of said episode.

== Episodes ==
No.	Title	Written by	Original release date
1	"From Today We Are Ultraman"; Transliteration: "Urutoraman Hajimemashita" (Japanese: ウルトラマンはじめました)	Takao Nakano	July 7, 2018
On their missing mother's birthday, the Minato brothers are caught in a monster attack. The monster, Grigeo Bone, resembles a drawing of an ancient deity but before the brothers can figure out the connection, they are caught in a blast of fire. The brothers are then selected to become Ultraman Rosso and Ultraman Blu by a mysterious force, leaving them only with their R/B Gyro, R/B Crystals transformation item, and a strange vision. This episode's segment for R/B Crystal Navi features the R/B Crystal of Ultraman Taro.
2	"The Bond of Brothers"; Transliteration: "Kyōdai no Kizuna" (Japanese: 兄弟の絆)	Junki Takegami	July 14, 2018
Isami is enjoying his newfound power as Ultraman Blu while his older brother Katsumi is worried about the dangers that come with their transformations. The difference in approach causes a rift between the brothers. The brothers' younger sister Asahi attempts to mend the rift but before she can, Isami is pinned down by a giant monster. Katsumi must once again transform into Ultraman Rosso and face his fears to save his younger brother. This episode's segment for R/B Crystal Navi features the R/B Crystal of Ultraman Ginga.
3	"Welcome to Aizentech"; Transliteration: "Aizentekku e Yōkoso" (Japanese: アイゼンテックへようこそ)	Satoshi Ito	July 21, 2018
Discovering how her mother discovered the existence of R/B Crystals in her diary, the Minato siblings took a visit to a Aizentech and met its president, Makoto Aizen. The man gladly reveals that 1,300 years prior, three meteors crashed the Ayaka City, representing Rosso, Blu and Grigio Bone. The two Ultramen dispersed into R/B Crystals upon impact but additional information regarding them disappeared with their mother. As Gargorgon appeared, the two brothers transform into Ultramen and used their newfound R/B Sluggers to finish it. Makoto was shown collecting Monster Crystals and is last seen recruiting a wanderer. This episode's segment for R/B Crystal Navi features the Monster Crystal of Grigeo Bone.
4	"The Winning Ball of Light"; Transliteration: "Hikari no Uiningu Bōru" (Japanese: 光のウイニングボール)	Sachio Yanai	July 28, 2018
When his baseball coach Kumashiro is about to retire, Katsumi becomes determined to put his team into victory, until an attack from Red King caused his right shoulder to be injured. Kumashiro on the other hand give Katsumi three R/B Crystals of Zero, X and Seven. On the day of the match, Makoto summoned Red King again, forcing Isami to fight the monster alone as Blu. Katsumi noticed this and left the baseball tournament as Kumashiro becomes the stand-in for the batter while Rosso used the Zero Crystal into use and defeated the monster. Although the local team lost, Katsumi had one final moment of playing baseball with his former coach. This episode's segment for R/B Crystal Navi features the R/B Crystal of Ultraman Zero.
5	"Goodbye, Icarus"; Transliteration: "Sayonara Ikarosu" (Japanese: さよならイカロス)	Hirotaka Adachi	August 4, 2018
Isami tries to help Yuuya, an eccentric student whose passion is to fly with her own gear. Wanting to collect the Wind R/B Crystal, he summoned Gue-Basser during one of Yuuya's experiments and the Minato brothers transform but the giant bird's typhoon were too much to handle. Once obtaining the Wind Crystal (Ultraman Tiga), Blu used it to assume Wind form and counter Gue-Basser's typhoon before finishing it with Rosso. Yuuya leaves the university to continue studying abroad after her invention proved successful. Meanwhile, Makoto had D.R.L.N. retrieved Gue-Basser's Monster Crystal as he obsessively polishes a damaged Orb Origin Crystal. This episode's segment for R/B Crystal Navi features the R/B Crystal of Ultraman Tiga.
6	"An Old Enemy! The Big Sister's Finisher Fist"; Transliteration: "Shukuteki! Anego Hissatsu-ken" (Japanese: 宿敵！あねご必殺拳)	Toshizo Nemoto	August 11, 2018
The Minato family received a visit from an old friend of the brothers, Kaoru Komaki, who was notorious for beating them in rock-paper-scissors. She was kidnapped by Makoto and strapped into Mecha-Gomora after the monster's initial fight with the Ultramen was less interesting. While under the dilemma of trying to save their old friend, Blu uses Seven Crystal to destroy the monster as Rosso utilized Wind form to save Kaoru, who was hospitalized later on. This episode's segment for R/B Crystal Navi features the R/B Crystal of Ultraseven.
7	"Hero Disqualification"; Transliteration: "Hīrō Shikkaku" (Japanese: ヒーロー失格)	Yūji Kobayashi	August 18, 2018
When Grigio Bone appeared for the second time, Isami's previous hesitation from saving Kaoru restricted him from transforming into Ultraman Blu. Makoto, who was observing the event from afar, transformed again to attack Kaoru's hospital before Isami regains his resolve and transformed to join Rosso in defeating Grigio Bone. At the end of the day, an exhausted Makoto managed to recruit his coworker from Aizentech and strap him alongside several people into a machine which linked to the damaged Orb Origin Crystal. This episode's segment for R/B Crystal Navi features the R/B Crystal of Ultraman X.
8	"The World Is Waiting for Me"; Transliteration: "Sekai-jū ga Ore o Matteiru" (Japanese: 世界中がオレを待っている)	Takao Nakano	August 25, 2018
As Katsumi and Isami are praised by the citizens of Ayaka city as its protectors (as Ultraman Rosso and Ultraman Blu), Makoto reveals his true colors after he has had enough of Katsumi and Isami's time as Ultraman. After revealing a dark secret that he has been keeping secret from the public, Makoto lures the brothers into a trap by revealing that he can become an Ultraman himself. This episode's segment for R/B Crystal Navi features the R/B Crystal of Ultraman Orb: Orb Origin.
9	"In the Name of Ultraman"; Transliteration: "Urutoraman no Na no Moto ni" (Japanese: ウルトラマンの名のもとに)	Hirotoshi Kobayashi	September 1, 2018
After Ultraman Rosso and Ultraman Blu have been defeated by Makoto's dark form of Ultraman Orb Dark, Katsumi and Isami train themselves in preparation for a rematch. Meanwhile, the brothers make a few discoveries: One about Makoto's deceptive "heroics", and a Ground Crystal (Ultraman Victory) that could help them stop the madman. This episode's segment for R/B Crystal Navi features the R/B Crystal of Ultraman Victory.
10	"The Minato Family's Day Off"; Transliteration: "Minato-ke no Kyūjitsu" (Japanese: 湊家の休日)	Kyoko Katsuya	September 8, 2018
Ushio Minato has taken his family out for a picnic, allowing Katsumi and Isami to take a break from the battles and enjoy a rare day off with their family. However, a vengeful Makoto wants his Orb Ring NEO back (after having it taken from him in his previous battle with Rosso and Blu,) and he has a monster that might get the job done... This episode's segment for R/B Crystal Navi features the Monster Crystal of Horoboros.
11	"Aizen Frenzy"; Transliteration: "Aizen Kyōsōkyoku" (Japanese: アイゼン狂騒曲)	Satoshi Ito	September 15, 2018
Ultraman Rosso and Ultraman Blu have been defeated by Makoto's new monster: Horoboros. When Ultraman Orb Dark further humiliates their failure by defeating Horoboros in battle when they couldn't, Katsumi and Isami question themselves as heroes. Meanwhile as the brothers try to make sense of and stop Makoto's latest plot, another threat makes her appearance known with Horoboros's help. This episode's segment for R/B Crystal Navi features the Monster Crystal of Bezelb.
12	"What We Should Protect"; Transliteration: "Oretachi ga Mamoru beki Mono" (Japanese: 俺たちの守るべきもの)	Junki Takegami	September 22, 2018
A mysterious woman has stolen the Horoboros Crystal and has unlocked a greater power within the monster, using it to destroy Ultraman Orb Dark and permanently putting an end to Makoto's plans. Katsumi and Isami must now find a way to stop the monster when its master could not. Meanwhile, Asahi learns the truth about her brothers' secret identities and her involvement just might help the brothers against the monster. This episode's segment for R/B Crystal Navi features the Monster Crystal of Gue-Basser.
13	"I Don't Want Secrets!"; Transliteration: "Himitsu wa Iya desu!" (Japanese: 秘密はイヤです！)	Junichiro Ashiki	September 29, 2018
Katsumi and Isami are practicing baseball when Asahi approaches them, demanding to know how they became Ultramen. With their secret out, Katsumi and Isami look back on their recent adventures as Ultraman Rosso and Ultraman Blu. Meanwhile, Ushio notices that something is off about Asahi, and tries to unravel a mystery surrounding her past.
14	"Who Are You?"; Transliteration: "Omae wa Dare da" (Japanese: お前は誰だ)	Misaki Morie	October 6, 2018
Asahi is driven away after Ushio upsets her by questioning her past. While she is away, she meets the mysterious woman, named "Saki Mitsurugi", who gifts Asahi with two R/B crystals before disappearing. As a result of her actions, Katsumi and Isami start arguing over what to do with this new adversary. Their arguing gets them into trouble when they are faced against Grigio King; an upgraded form of Grigio Bone being controlled by an unwitting Makoto. This episode's segment for R/B Crystal Navi features the Monster Crystal of Grigeo King.
15	"Enshrined by Kiwami"; Transliteration: "Matō wa Kiwami" (Japanese: まとうは極)	Takao Nakano	October 13, 2018
Tension flares up between Katsumi and Isami after their recent loss against Grigio King, and Asahi tries to mend their bitter fallout. Meanwhile, Saki takes command of AizenTech after unleashing the Makoto-controlled Grigio King once more. When Asahi places herself in danger, Katsumi and Isami realize the recklessness of their actions and work together to protect their sister, inadvertently unlocking a new fusion of Ultraman Rosso and Ultraman Blu: Ultraman Ruebe. This episode's segment for R/B Crystal Navi features the R/B Crystal of Ultraman.
16	"This Moment Is a Bond"; Transliteration: "Kono Shunkan ga Kizuna" (Japanese: この瞬間が絆)	Sachio Yanai	October 20, 2018
After spending several days being unable to find evidence supporting that she is a part of the Minato family, Asahi runs away from home, suffering from an identity crisis. Meanwhile, Saki takes full control of AizenTech, now having disposed of Makoto and Chereza. Katsumi and Isami must now find their sister before she is killed by the transparent monster: Neronga. This episode's segment for R/B Crystal Navi features the R/B Crystal of Ultraman Belial.
17	"Everyone Is Friends"; Transliteration: "Min'na ga Tomodachi" (Japanese: みんなが友だち)	Aya Satsuki	October 27, 2018
It's Halloween in Ayaka City. Asahi and her friends can't find a place to hold a party, while the alien Dada and a Pigmon can't find guests to attend a party they're already hosting. When the two parties meet, they plan to hold a fantastic party together - until Dada finds out that Asahi is the sister of Ultraman Rosso and Ultraman Blu... Meanwhile, Saki has a horrifying announcement to make to everyone on Earth... This episode's segment for R/B Crystal Navi features the Monster Crystal of Dada.
18	"A World Without Tomorrow"; Transliteration: "Asu Naki Sekai" (Japanese: 明日なき世界)	Kyoko Katsuya	November 3, 2018
Alien Mefilas, the director of space channel NPTV, is looking for a solution to save their low ratings. After learning about Saki's declaration of use Earth as a bomb to destroy Leugocyte, he sees it as an opportunity to make a feature program about Ushio, who is famous for his distinct T-shirts designs, as a hostage to draw out one of the ultraman brothers. To make matters worse, they put their eyes on Asahi as well. This episode's segment for R/B Crystal Navi features the Monster Crystal of Red King.
19	"The Good and the Bad"; Transliteration: "Zen'nin to Aku'nin" (Japanese: 善人と悪人)	Junki Takegami	November 10, 2018
D.R.L.N., AizenTech's A.I., goes rogue and activates "Plan AZ", a failsafe measure that was integrated when Makoto was still president. To make matters worse, Asahi is taken hostage by the A.I. and placed inside the body of the robot, King Joe. With time running out, Katsumi, Isami, and Saki form an uneasy alliance to save Asahi before it's too late. This episode's segment for R/B Crystal Navi features the Monster Crystal of King Joe.
20	"Memory of Stardust"; Transliteration: "Hoshikuzu no Kioku" (Japanese: 星屑の記憶)	Yūji Kobayashi	November 17, 2018
Saki has stolen Katsumi and Isami's Gyros in order to carry out her plan to use Earth as a bomb to destroy Leugocyte. After Asahi informs them about Saki's past, the brothers become conflicted over what to do and resume arguing once more. Their confliction worsens when the monster Gomora attacks, and Saki transforms into Grand King Megaloth, and the brothers are unable to fuse into Ultraman Ruebe. This episode's segment for R/B Crystal Navi features the Monster Crystal of Gomora.
21	"Candies and Manjū"; Transliteration: "Amedama to Omanjū" (Japanese: あめ玉とおまんじゅう)	Toshizō Nemoto	November 24, 2018
After a very narrow victory against Grand King Megaloth, and time running out for Earth as Leugocyte draws nearer, Katusmi, Isami, and Saki are forced to make a compromise. During which, Saki reveals an untold truth about their mother, causing an even greater rift between the parties. Now Katsumi and Isami must get past their confliction to use Ultraman Ruebe's power when Saki summons Horoboros once more. This episode's segment for R/B Crystal Navi features the Monster Crystal of Grand King Megalos.
22	"The Extradimensional Mother"; Transliteration: "Ijigen Kāsan" (Japanese: 異次元かあさん)	Misaki Morie	December 1, 2018
Mio Minato, Katsumi and Isami's long-lost mother, has finally returned home. While Ushio was filled with joy, the brothers feel that something is off about her. At the same time, the monster Kamisori Demaaga has also emerged with Mio during their escape, and starts feeding on Ray Energy, the same energy that Saki needs to destroy the Earth with. This episode's segment for R/B Crystal Navi features the Monster Crystal of Kamisori Demaaga.
23	"The Crystal of Destruction"; Transliteration: "Horobi no Kurisutaru" (Japanese: 滅びのクリスタル)	Satoshi Ito	December 8, 2018
Mio reveals that she knows about Katsumi and Isami's identities as Ultraman Rosso and Ultraman Blu, as well as her knowledge on Leugocyte. Using their Gyros, she successfully manages to trap the entity inside a Monster Crystal, temporarily averting Earth's destruction. Despite this, Saki is determined to see her plan through to the end. This episode's segment for R/B Crystal Navi features the Monster Crystal of Grigio Regina.
24	"I Am Happy"; Transliteration: "Watashi wa Happī" (Japanese: 私はハッピー)	Junki Takegami	December 15, 2018
Leugocyte is freed from its crystal after Saki's interference in Mio's plan, and its only opposition is Saki as Grigio Regina, and Mio utilizing Plan AZ. Meanwhile, Ushio refuses to let Katsumi and Isami become ultramen, after Mio reveals that she had foreseen a future where the brothers were murdered by the entity, fearing that her premonition might come true. Asahi however is determined to save her friend.
25	"Sunrise Hits Home"; Transliteration: "Asahi no Ataru Ie" (Japanese: 朝日のあたる家)	Takao Nakano	December 22, 2018
Saki has died of her injuries she sustained against Leugocyte, and Ultraman Rosso and Ultraman Blu are forcefully reverted back to human after Mio locks Katsumi and Isami out of their Gyros, plotting to drag Leugocyte to another dimension with herself. Now only Asahi can help the ultraman brothers against the life-form after she has an epiphany.
