= NHK Spring Mitsuzawa Football Stadium =

Building in Kanagawa-ku, Kanagawa Prefecture, Japan

Coordinates: 35°28′09″N 139°36′13″E

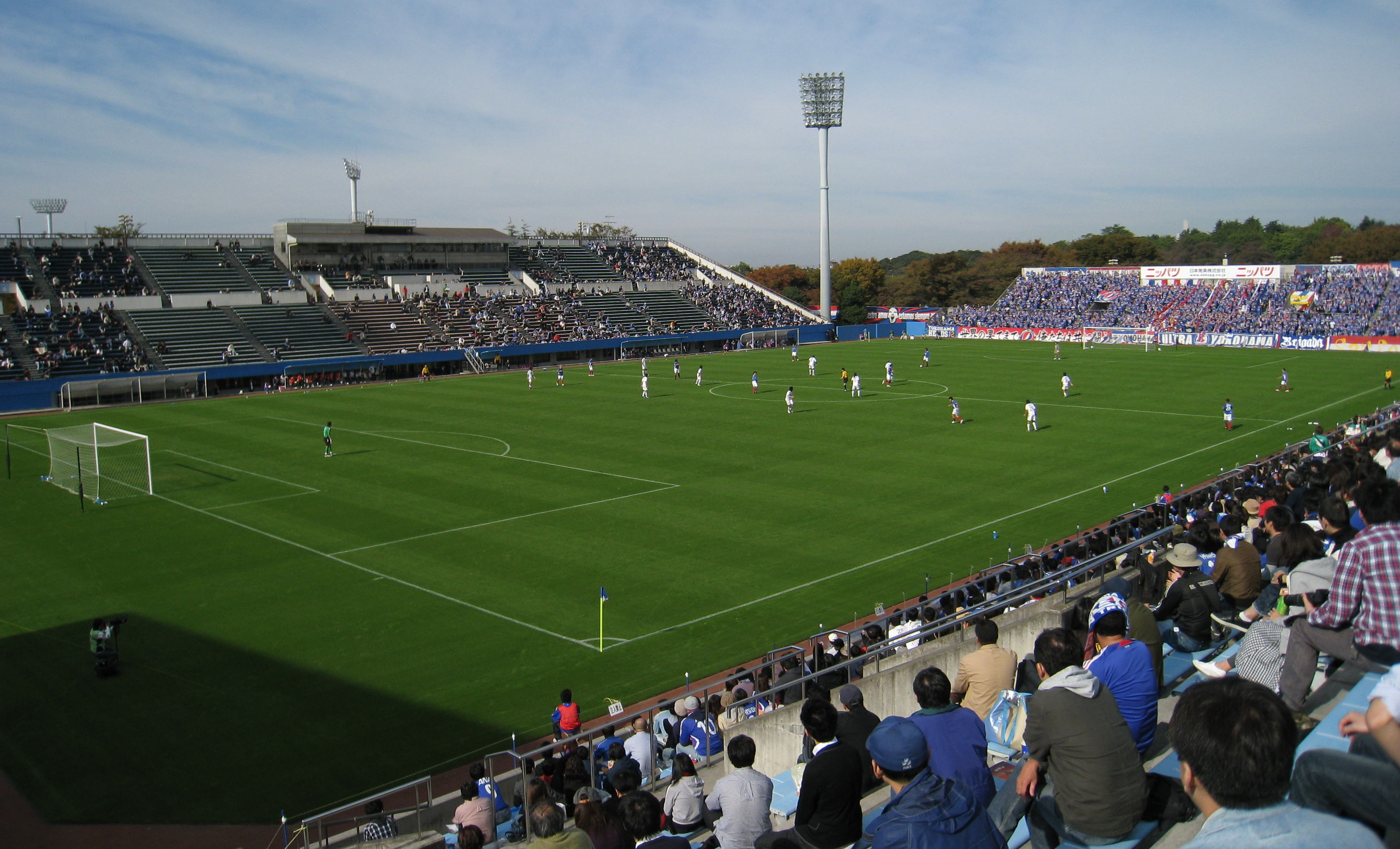
- The stadium on a matchday
- Interactive map of NHK Spring Mitsuzawa Football Stadium
- Former names: Yokohama Mitsuzawa Football Stadium (1955–2008)
- Location: Kanagawa-ku, Yokohama, Japan
- Owner: Yokohama City Government
- Operator: Yokohama City Government
- Capacity: 15,454
- Surface: Grass
- Public transit: Yokohama Municipal Subway: Blue Line at Mitsuzawa-kamichō

Construction
- Opened: 1955
- Expanded: 1964, 1993

Tenants
- YSCC Yokohama (1986–present); Yokohama F. Marinos (1993–1997); Yokohama FC (1998–present); Nittaidai Ladies FC

The NHK Spring Mitsuzawa Football Stadium (ニッパツ三ツ沢球技場, Nippatsu Mitsuzawa Kyūgijō) is an association football stadium in Kanagawa-ku, Yokohama, Japan. It serves as a home ground of Yokohama FC and, on occasion, Yokohama F. Marinos. Until 1999 it had been the home of Yokohama FC's spiritual predecessor, Yokohama Flügels, and also, on occasion, of Kawasaki-based NKK FC. The stadium holds 15,454 people.

It was formerly known as Yokohama Mitsuzawa Football Stadium. Since March 2008 it has been called NHK Spring Mitsuzawa Football Stadium for the naming rights by NHK Spring Company.

It is also used sometimes for Top League rugby games.

During the 1964 Summer Olympics in Tokyo, it hosted some of the football preliminaries. It was also one of the venues of the 1979 FIFA World Youth Championship.

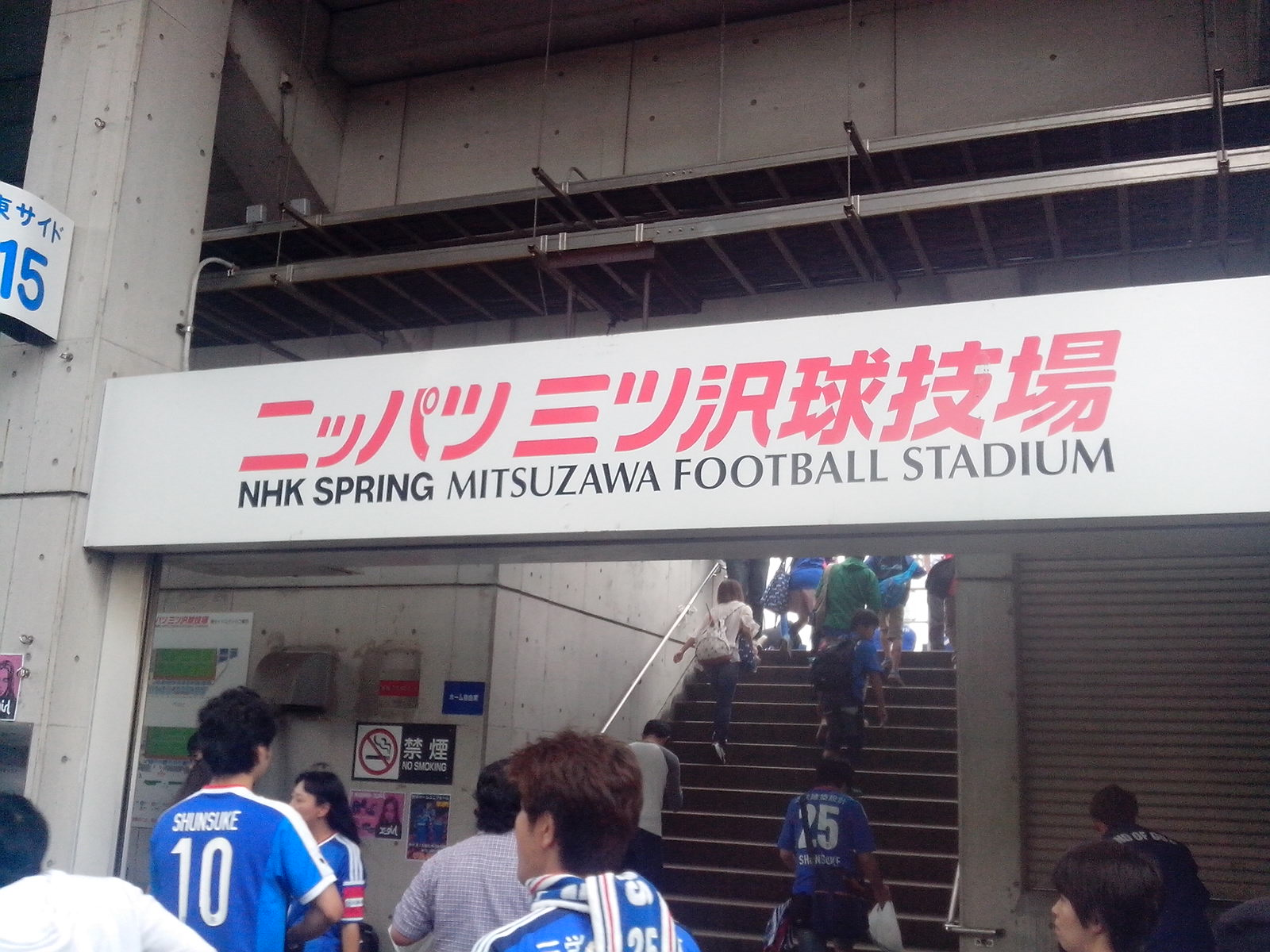

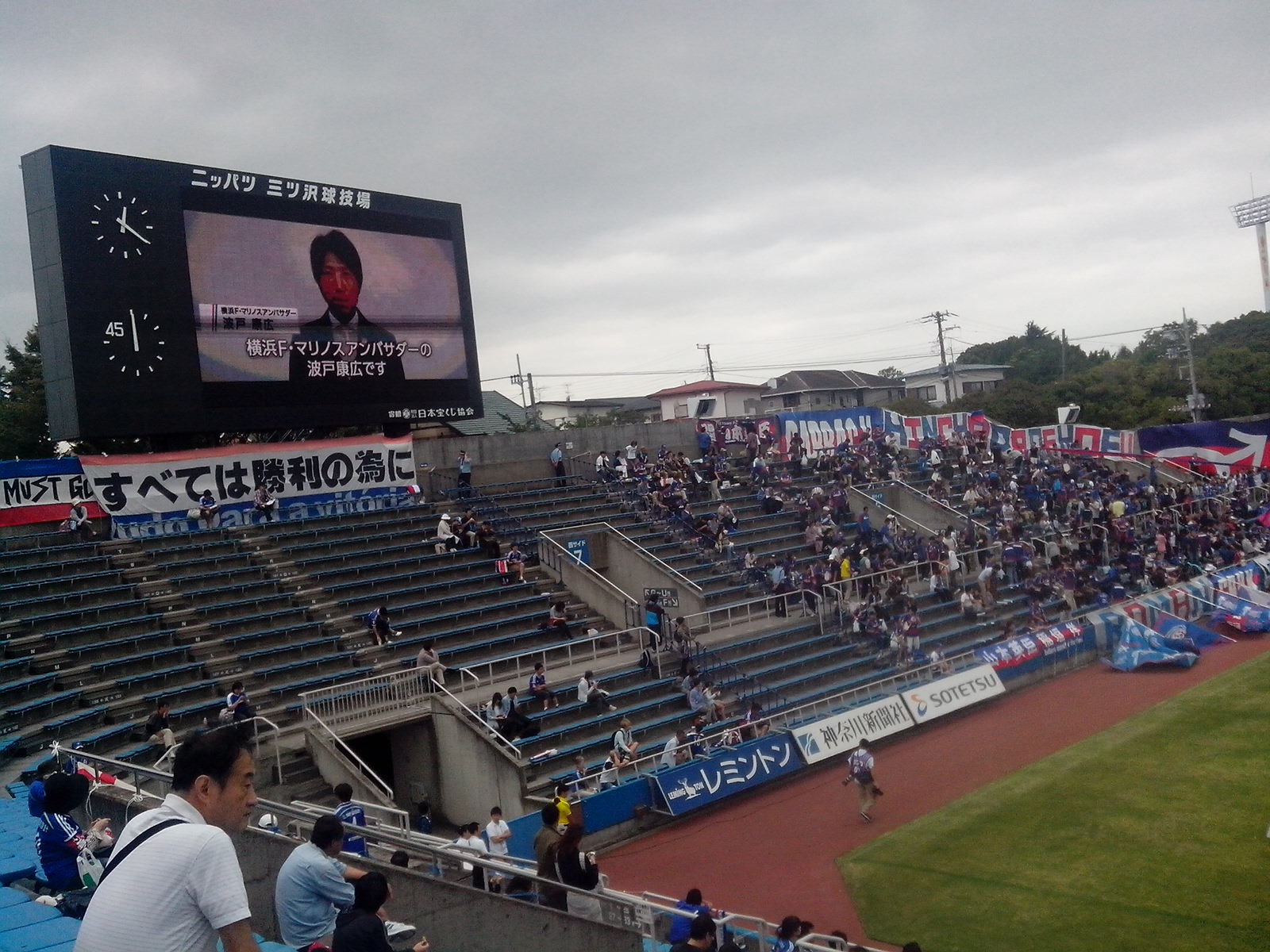

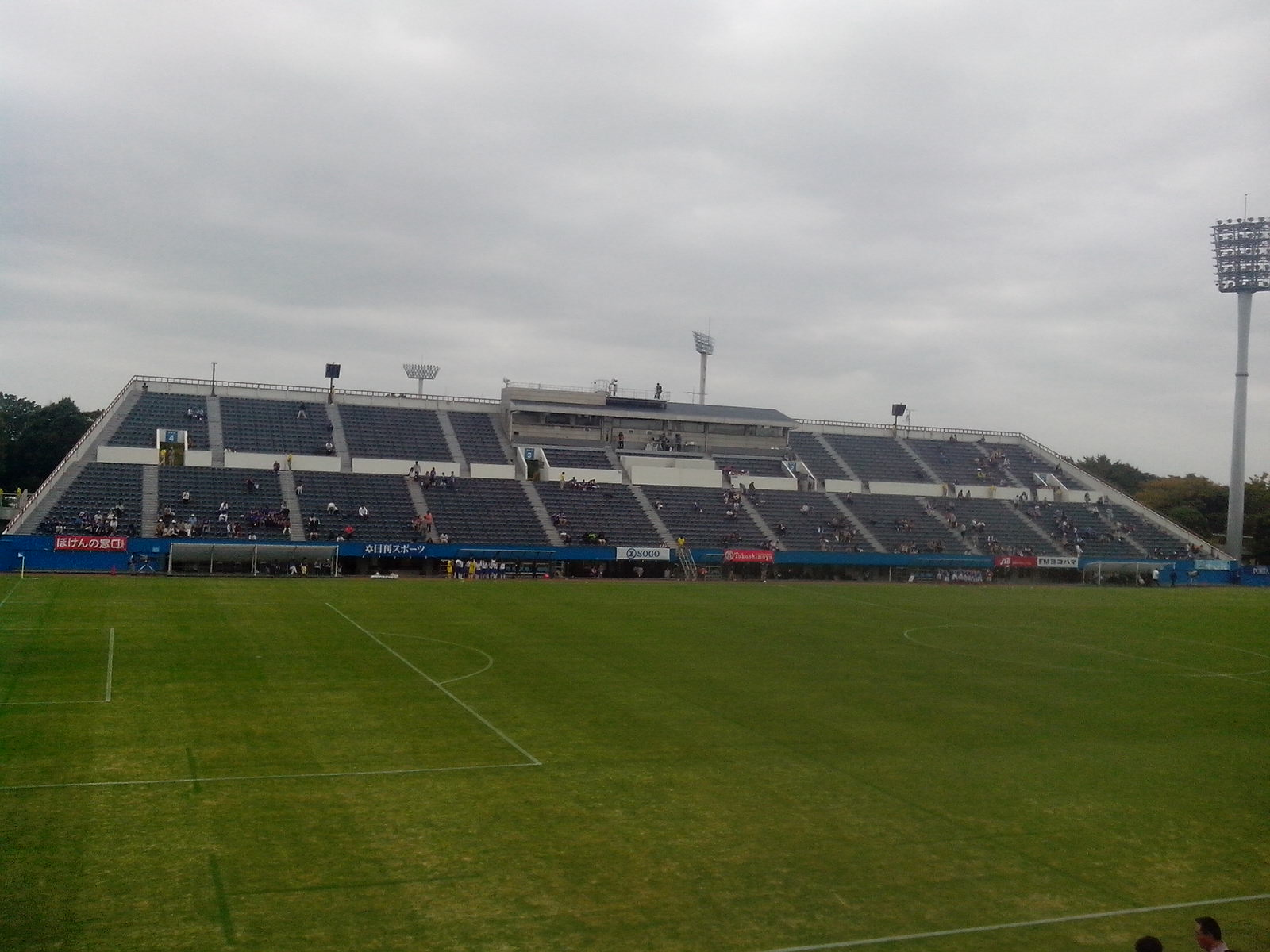
