= Kanata Hongō =

Japanese actor (born 1990)

- 本郷 奏多
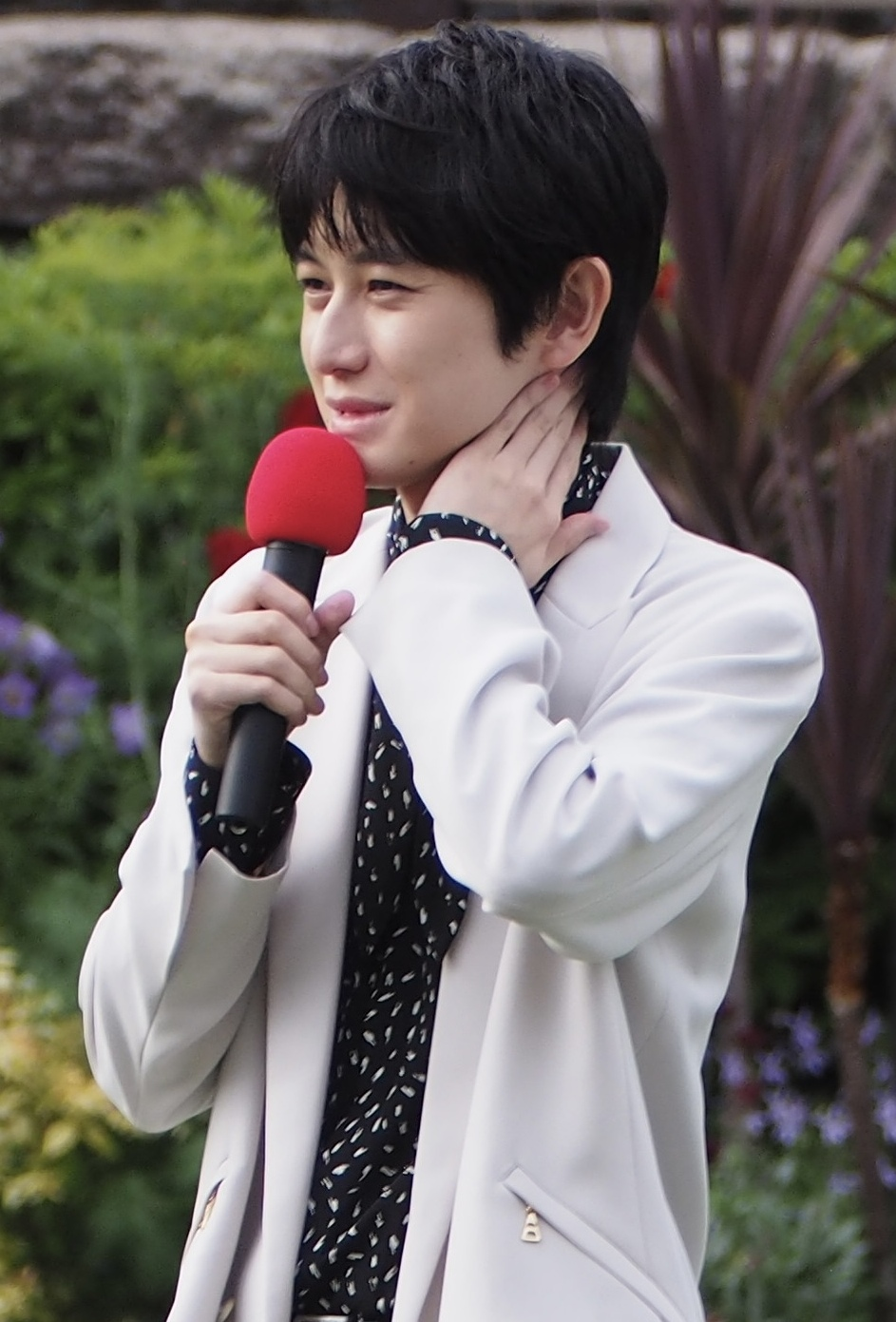
- Hongo in May 2023
- Born: November 15, 1990 (age 35); Sendai, Miyagi, Japan
- Other names: Kacchan (かっちゃん); Kannaty (カナティ)
- Education: Nihon University College of Art
- Occupations: Actor; model
- Years active: 2002–present
- Agent: Stardust Promotion

Japanese name
- Kanji: 本郷 奏多
- Hiragana: ほんごう かなた
- Katakana: ホンゴウ カナタ
Transcriptions
- Romanization: Hongō Kanata
- Website: Official website

Kanata Hongō (本郷 奏多, Hongō Kanata; born November 15, 1990) is a Japanese actor. He is part of Stardust Promotion and has appeared several times in music videos, movies, TV series, and magazines. His major breakthrough role was as Ryoma Echizen in the live-action film adaptation of The Prince of Tennis and became even more widely known when he was cast as Shin in Nana 2. In television, his most notable role was as Hinata in Himitsu no Hanazono and he starred in Seigi no Mikata. For the live-action feature film adaptation of Attack on Titan, he portrayed Armin Arlert. He has also been involved in anime voice acting as the lead character Ryōta Sakamoto in Btooom!.

He is occasionally incorrectly credited as Sōta Hongō.

== Early life ==
Hongō was born in Sendai, Miyagi Prefecture. When he was in kindergarten, he became active as a child model for Sendai SOS Model Agency (now Morado Company).

He attended Nihon University College of Art, where he studied photography and graduated in 2013. In 2020, he was selected for the 14th Nihon University Awards and appointed as Nihon University Ambassador.

== Career ==
=== 2003–2006: Beginnings as a child actor ===
Hongō has appeared in several movies, including Moon Child, which also starred Gackt, Hyde, and Leehom Wang. Hongō played the role of Sho as a child, while the adult role was played by Gackt. He appeared in the movie Daiteiden no Yoru ni, released in November 2003.

Hongō starred in the 2005 film Hinokio, which was his first major role. He also appeared in two music videos in 2005, portraying the young boy in the singer YUI's music video for her song "Tomorrow's Way" and in "Zutto Yomikake no Natsu" by Keiichi Tomita featuring the pop duo CHEMISTRY.

In 2006, Hongō was cast as the popular anime character Ryoma Echizen in the live-action adaptation film of The Prince of Tennis. He joined the majority of the Seigaku Regulars of the Prince of Tennis musicals as he was replacing Kotaro Yanagi, who could not play the role due to a car accident he was involved in. Hongō also portrayed the young bassist Shinichi Okazaki in the movie Nana 2, which was released in Japan on December 9, 2006. He had replaced Kenichi Matsuyama, who had previously played Shin in the first Nana film. He also appeared in three episodes of the 2006 TBS series Memories of Matsuko.

=== 2007–2013: Rising popularity ===
His next feature film was alongside Michael Pitt and Keira Knightley in Silk which was screened at the 2007 Cannes Film Festival. This marked Hongō's first appearance in an English language film, where he played a Japanese servant boy. He also starred in another music video, B'zs "Eien no Tsubasa" along with Tsubasa Honda and in GReeeeN's music video of "Namida Sora". In television, Hongō's first major role was as major supporting character Hinata in Himitsu no Hanazono, followed by another major supporting character role in the drama Seito Shokun! as a rebellious student, Kohei Aoki. Later, he appeared as a guest in two other shows, namely Detective School Q and Iryu: Team Medical Dragon 2.

In 2008, he starred as Riku Okamoto in Seigi no Mikata, broadcast by NTV. He said Okamoto was probably his most normal role to date. He was then featured in the music video for The Gospellers' "Sky High", which was the opening to the second season of anime Nodame Cantabile. Moreover, he starred in three films in late 2008, including Aoi Tori, K-20: Legend of the Mask, and Goth. The latter two were released in Japan on the same day, December 20. Goth is based on a Japanese novel of the same name, written by Otsuichi.

In 2011, he portrayed the role of Jōichiro Nishi in Gantz and reprised his role in its sequel film Gantz: Perfect Answer, as well as its sequel series Gantz: Another Gantz. He also appeared in the drama special Saigo no Bansan: Keiji Tono Kazuyuki to Shichinin no Yougisha, playing the character of a suspect among others. Moreover, he was a guest in one episode of Shibuya Deep A, a series broadcast by NHK. He also made his stage debut in June 2011, performing in the Dotto! 25th anniversary play, Kinema no Kami-sama.

In January 2012, Shirato Osamu no Jikenbo was aired at TBS, where Hongō played the role of Kurosaki Hitoshi opposite Yudai Chiba. He also starred in Mirai Nikki Another: World, a drama adaptation of the Japanese series of the same name. In October of the same year, he debuted as a voice actor in the anime Btooom! as the lead character Ryōta Sakamoto. Hongō also starred in the NHK FM Theater radio drama Mayu, which also marked his radio debut. He also performed onstage in the rōdoku geki entitled Fuki no Hatsukoi, Ebina SA in September 2012. In October 2012, he appeared in the third short movie of the web drama Heather LOVE Short Movies entitled Umi Made Nan-kiro, marking his debut in the said platform.

In 2013, Hongō starred in Real Onigokko: The Origin as one of the lead characters, Tsubasa Sato, and in the UULA original web drama Yubikoi: Kimi ni Okuru Message alongside Korean actor Seungri and Japanese actress Miori Takimoto. He also appeared as a guest character in the series Minna! ESPer Dayo! and in the drama special So Long!, which was broadcast by NTV. Hongō also appeared in the WOWOW series KAZEOKE in August 2013 and performed in the radio drama Inanagi in February of the same year.

=== 2014–2018: Transition in roles and success in Japan ===
Hongō starred in the 2014 drama Nazo no Tenkōsei as the titular character, who came from a parallel world, and he also appeared in the baseball drama Yowakutemo Katemasu as part of its recurring cast. In March 2014, he appeared in a guest role in the drama adaptation of Koibumi Biyori. He played the lead role in the film Tokyo Slaves, which was based on the Japanese novel series Doreiku written by Shinichi Okada. Hongō also voiced Julian Ayers Mackenzie in the science fiction anime Gundam Build Fighters. He starred in the stage adaptation of the visual novel franchise Danganronpa entitled Danganronpa: Kibō no Gakuen to Zetsubō no Kōkōsei THE STAGE. He portrayed the lead character Makoto Naegi throughout its theatrical run from October to November 2014.

In 2015, Hongō portrayed the mahjong prodigy Shigeru Akagi in Akagi, a drama based on the manga of the same name. He also starred in the NHK miniseries Chanpon Tabetaka, the sequel to the 2013 series Castella. By 2014, Hongō was revealed to portray Armin in the 2015 live-action adaptation of the hit series Attack on Titan by Hajime Isayama, which was aired in August 2015. He then reprised his role in the film's second part, Attack on Titan: End of the World, which was released in September 2015. He also made a cameo appearance in the film Strayer's Chronicle, which was distributed by Warner Bros. Pictures, and he starred in the film Cinema Angel opposite Reiko Fujiwara and Mickey Curtis.

Hongō starred in the 2016 drama-comedy film Yamikin Ushijima-kun Part 3 alongside Takayuki Yamada and Gou Ayano. He also starred in the WOWOW series Kakko no Tamago wa Dare no Mono, and reprised his character as Makoto Naegi in Danganronpa: Kibō no Gakuen to Zetsubō no Kōkōsei THE STAGE 2016, which ran from June to July 2016.

In 2017, Hongō played the role of young Jun Sekiya in Hyouka: Forbidden Secrets starring Kento Yamazaki and Alice Hirose, an adaptation of the Japanese mystery novel Hyouka. In December 2017, he portrayed the antagonist Envy in Fullmetal Alchemist, a live-action adaptation of the shōnen series of the same name. He starred in the series Rabuho no Ueno-san based on the seinen manga of the same name, portraying the titular character Ueno, and he later reprised this role for its second season. He also played the lead character in the four-episode late night drama Kaiju Club. Hongō also reprised the role of Shigeru Akagi in Akagi: Ryūzaki·Yagi-hen/Ichikawa-hen, the second part of its eponymous 2015 series. He appeared in the music video in Nano's 5th anniversary album The Crossing, which was released on May 31, 2017. He voiced Sorrel in the Pokémon film Pokémon the Movie: I Choose You! and voiced Naoyuki Andō in the anime Inuyashiki, whom he also portrayed in the 2018 live-action adaptation of the same name.

Hongō starred in the 2018 Yomiuri TV–NTV drama Repeat opposite Shihori Kanjiya and Gori. In May 2018, he reprised the character of Shigeru Akagi in the concluding season of its 2015 series entitled Akagi: Washizu Mājan Kanketsu-hen. He also starred in the LINE NEWS original web drama Mirai-san as the brother of the titular character.

=== 2019–present: Career resurgence and continued success in roles ===
In 2019, Hongō starred in the mystery film Rin alongside Hayato Sano. He also portrayed Seikyou in the live-action adaptation Kingdom based on the 2006 manga of the same name, and played the role of contract killer Kid in the film Diner directed by Mika Ninagawa. He portrayed the character of Isami Kondō in the MBS drama Aozakura: Bōei Daigakukou Monogatari, which was based on the manga of the same name. He also starred in the stage play MONSTER MATES, which ran from February to March 2019, and performed in the Reading·Stage Yubi to Bara on June 15, 2019.

He starred in the 2020 time travel-themed film Sengoku Girl to Kendo Boy opposite Kie Kitano. He also portrayed Makoto Karaki, the protagonist of the adventure game Death Come True written and directed by Kazutaka Kodaka.

== Personal life ==
Hongō is known to be an avid fan of Gundam and Gunpla. In February 2020, during the Gunpla 40th Anniversary Project Presentation, he was invited as a talk show guest, where he stated that he has collected at least a hundred Gunpla kits and that Gunpla is quite useful for communication that "can allow us to connect with older generations".

In November 2020, on his 30th birthday, Hongō launched his own YouTube channel entitled Kanata Hongō's Daily Life (本郷奏多の日常, Hongō Kanata no Nichijō). He has said that he became interested in YouTube through Tokai On Air, of which he is a fan and friend, and they have since appeared in several videos together.

=== Marriage ===
On January 1, 2026, Hongō announced his marriage to a non-celebrity woman through a handwritten letter posted on his personal Twitter account.

== Filmography ==
=== Film ===
| Year | Title | Role | Notes | Ref. |
|---|---|---|---|---|
| 2011 | Gantz | Jōichiro Nishi | | |
| 2015 | Attack on Titan | Armin | | |
| 2018 | Inuyashiki | Naoyuki Andō | | |
| 2019 | Kingdom | Seikyou | | |
| 2022 | Usogui: Lie Eater | Kirou Mekama | | |
| 2022 | Fullmetal Alchemist: The Revenge of Scar | Envy | | |
| 2022 | Fullmetal Alchemist: The Final Alchemy | Envy | | |
| 2023 | Shin Kamen Rider | Kamakiri Kamereon Augment-01 | | |
| 2024 | Teppen no Ken | | Lead role | |

=== Television ===
| Year | Title | Role | Notes | Ref. |
|---|---|---|---|---|
| 2005 | Charming | Shu Nagumo | | |
| 2020–2021 | Awaiting Kirin | Konoe Sakihisa | Taiga drama | |
| 2022 | Come Come Everybody | Bunshirō Igarashi | Asadora | |
| 2023 | YuYu Hakusho | Hiei | | |
| 2024 | Dear Radiance | Emperor Kazan | Taiga drama | |
| 2025 | The Laughing Salesman | Haruo Miedake | Episode 3 | |

=== Video games ===
| Year | Title | Role | Notes | Ref. |
|---|---|---|---|---|
| 2020 | Death Come True | Makoto Karaki | Lead role | |
| 2026 | Nioh 3 | Tokugawa Kunimatsu | | |

== Books/magazines ==
- Boy Actor vol.1 (September 2005 and PIA)
- "Nana2" Novelization (2006 and Shueisha Cobalt)
- Real G vol.1 (January 2007 and SDP)
- Real G vol.2 (May 2007 and SDP)
- Junon Magazine (June 2014)

== Others ==
- Concert Costarring "Gackt Live Tour 2003 The Month Of The Upper Chord"
- The Radio Play "At Night Of A Big Blackout" – Shota Tazawa
