= List of Welcome to the N.H.K. episodes =

This article lists the episodes attributed to the anime version of Welcome to the N.H.K. It aired in Japan between July 9, 2006, and December 17, 2006, containing 24 episodes.

== Episode list ==
No.	Title	Original release date
1	"Welcome to the Project!"; Transliteration: "Purojekuto ni Yōkoso!" (Japanese: プロジェクトにようこそ!)	July 9, 2006
Tatsuhiro Satō's hikikomori origins are explained. His anxieties lead him to believe that he is a victim of a conspiracy known as the N.H.K., which creates hikikomori via manipulating the media. He is constantly annoyed by hearing the music of an unknown otaku living next door. He meets a mysterious girl called Misaki Nakahara who claims to be able to cure his hikikomori ways.
2	"Welcome to the Creator!"; Transliteration: "Kurieitā ni Yōkoso!" (Japanese: クリエイターにようこそ!)	July 16, 2006
Misaki tries to convince Tatsuhiro to sign a contract with her, whereby he will be obligated to listen to her as she tries to ease him out of his hikikomori lifestyle. Later, Tatsuhiro discovers that his otaku neighbor is actually his high school friend Kaoru Yamazaki who is studying a media course in creating games. Using Kaoru's book, he fibs to Misaki that he is actually a games creator, not a hikikomori, and that he could show her a game that he had made. Overhearing this conversation, Kaoru decides to help Tatsuhiro make an eroge, and assigns him the role of the scenario writer.
3	"Welcome to the Beautiful Girls!"; Transliteration: "Bishōjo ni Yōkoso!" (Japanese: 美少女にようこそ!)	July 23, 2006
Kaoru introduces Tatsuhiro to eroge, and Tatsuhiro spends all his time playing all of Kaoru's erotic games and collecting pornographic pictures for "reference material". He ends up not doing any work on the game, much to Kaoru's chagrin.
4	"Welcome to the New World!"; Transliteration: "Shin Sekai ni Yōkoso!" (Japanese: 新世界にようこそ!)	July 30, 2006
Tatsuhiro is now a full-fledged otaku, and Kaoru brings him to Akihabara in hopes that it will inspire him to work. They end up going to maid cafes and spending all their money on otaku merchandise. By chance, Tatsuhiro bumps into his high school senior Hitomi Kashiwa, and ends up having a drink with her.
5	"Welcome to Counseling!"; Transliteration: "Kaunseringu ni Yōkoso!" (Japanese: カウンセリングにようこそ!)	August 6, 2006
Hitomi and Tatsuhiro's past is explored briefly. Tatsuhiro finally admits to Misaki that he is a hikikomori, and signs the contract. They have their first counseling session, and Tatsuhiro embarrasses Misaki with the concept of dream interpretation.
6	"Welcome to the Classroom!"; Transliteration: "Kurasurūmu ni Yōkoso!" (Japanese: クラスルームにようこそ!)	August 13, 2006
Tatsuhiro discovers from Misaki that Kaoru has a cute girlfriend in his media school. Despite his hikikomori condition, Tatsuhiro ventures out to Kaoru's school to ascertain the truth. However, while the trip causes him another panic attack, he manages to find out the truth about Kaoru's supposed relationship.
7	"Welcome to the Moratorium!"; Transliteration: "Moratoriamu ni Yōkoso!" (Japanese: モラトリアムにようこそ!)	August 20, 2006
Traumatized by his latest panic attack, Tatsuhiro refuses to leave his apartment. Under the guise of a summer flu, he gets Kaoru to buy him his daily necessities. Later, he is surprised by a phone call from his mother who tells him that she would like to visit him and discuss his future. He prevaricates, fearing the assumptions of his mother, claiming that he has a job and a girlfriend whom he plans to marry. This leads Tatsuhiro in even deeper trouble, and he gets Kaoru to help him create a fake video game developing company. Misaki later volunteers to be his girlfriend.
8	"Welcome to Chinatown!"; Transliteration: "Chūkagai ni Yōkoso!" (Japanese: 中華街にようこそ!)	August 27, 2006
Tatsuhiro is desperately attempting to clean his dirty apartment before his mother comes, and Misaki helps him. The two and Tatsuhiro's mother later have lunch in a Chinese restaurant. When Tatsuhiro leaves to go to the bathroom, his mother tells Misaki that she knows this was all a setup because she could always tell whenever he was lying. Tatsuhiro overhears this and starts feeling even guiltier. However, in his presence, his mother goes along with the story and does not give Tatsuhiro a chance to clear himself. Tatsuhiro and Misaki later get carried away with their fake relationship.
9	"Welcome to Summer Days!"; Transliteration: "Natsu no Hi ni Yōkoso!" (Japanese: 夏の日にようこそ)	September 3, 2006
Kaoru is crushed when he is turned down by a girl named Nanako Midorikawa, after inviting her to go a fireworks festival with him. She claims that she has an audition the same night, and Kaoru accepts this excuse but does not believe it. Meanwhile, Tatsuhiro is tormented by his newfound feelings for Misaki, and is so disturbed he can't concentrate on writing a scenario. Tatsuhiro and Kaoru decide to showcase their game in the Summer Comiket, otherwise known as NatsuComi. Tatsuhiro later goes with Misaki to the fireworks festival.
10	"Welcome to the Dark Side!"; Transliteration: "Dāku Saido ni Yōkoso!" (Japanese: ダークサイドにようこそ!)	September 10, 2006
Yamazaki has another date with Nanako, but when he sees her with another guy, he does not believe her that it was just coincidence and leaves. Tatsuhiro and Kaoru decide that Misaki is being purposefully mysterious and misleading. They stalk her in order to find out her real motives. Tatsuhiro has a dream in which his appliances warn him that he will be doomed to be a hikikomori for the rest of his life if he falls for Misaki.
11	"Welcome to the Conspiracy!"; Transliteration: "Inbō ni Yōkoso!" (Japanese: 陰謀にようこそ!)	September 17, 2006
Hitomi's feelings of isolation lead her to join a mysterious internet group, where she makes up stories about being beaten up by her lover, for whom she imagines to be Tatsuhiro. Meanwhile, Tatsuhiro and Kaoru have finished making the game for NatsuComi and are preparing for the trip. It is shown that Hitomi is having dinner with Akira Jōgasaki, however she is disappointed to see him caring more about his work. Tatsuhiro is contacted by her, and the two spend the night, as he eventually finds out about the offline meeting.
12	"Welcome to the Offline Gathering!"; Transliteration: "Ofukai ni Yōkoso!" (Japanese: オフ会にようこそ!)	September 24, 2006
Tatsuhiro and Hitomi meet up with the other members of the internet group, and they head off to a beach island. The dark and grim atmosphere of the group makes Tatsuhiro suspicious of their true intentions.
13	"Welcome to Heaven!"; Transliteration: "Tengoku ni Yōkoso!" (Japanese: 天国にようこそ!)	October 1, 2006
The offline meeting turns out to be a suicide pact, and Tatsuhiro gets entangled in their scheme. Meanwhile, Misaki, Kaoru and Jōgasaki are able to put together what is happening, and rush to save the group.
14	"Welcome to Reality!"; Transliteration: "Riaru ni Yōkoso!" (Japanese: 現実(リアル)にようこそ!)	October 8, 2006
After recovering from the offline meeting, the group ends up getting checked into a hot springs resort courtesy of Jōgasaki, who also contacts the families of the internet group. Their loved ones come and show them that their lives mean something. Tatsuhiro and Misaki are still on bad terms until they meet for one more meeting.
15	"Welcome to the Fantasy!"; Transliteration: "Fantajī ni Yōkoso!" (Japanese: ファンタジーにようこそ!)	October 15, 2006
Tatsuhiro deliberately searches for a job after learning that his allowance is cut in half. Ultimately, he decides to join a MMORPG called "Ultimate Fantasy" in order to make some cash by selling game items for real money. His obsession with the MMORPG deters him to slack off on his eroge scenarios with Kaoru, as well as to miss counseling sessions with Misaki. Meanwhile, on the MMORPG world called Vina Teelo, Tatsuhiro meets a catgirl called Mia, forming a party with her.
16	"Welcome to Game Over!"; Transliteration: "Gēmu Ōbā ni Yōkoso!" (Japanese: ゲームオーバーにようこそ!)	October 22, 2006
Misaki walks in to a rather disheveled Tatsuhiro within a cluttered room, as he has apparently relapsed into his old hikikomori ways. When Tatsuhiro decides to search for an item to sell, his partner Mia invites a party along for dragon slaying. Misaki attempts to free Tatsuhiro from his obsession, however Tatsuhiro finally ceases when he realizes that the catgirl partner Mia turns out to be Kaoru.
17	"Welcome to Happiness!"; Transliteration: "Hapinesu ni Yōkoso!" (Japanese: はぴねすにようこそ!)	October 29, 2006
Tatsuhiro meets up with an old high school friend, his class representative Megumi Kobayashi. When he divulges to her about being a hikikomori, she tells him she knows someone who can help cure his dilemma. She ends up whisking him off to an old dilapidated building where he finds himself listening to a multi-level marketing sales pitch on a pseudo detergent product. Tatsuhiro manages to escape, but Megumi chases after him and tells him her depressing story. He buys the washing powder from her.
18	"Welcome to No Future!"; Transliteration: "Nō Fyūchā ni Yōkoso!" (Japanese: ノーフューチャーにようこそ!)	November 5, 2006
Realizing he has been tricked, Tatsuhiro meets with Megumi to call the deal off. Although, she seems willing to let him go at first. Nonetheless, she soon manages to distract Tatsuhiro, Misaki, and Kaoru, eventually selling them an ersatz set of dietary supplements, which would allegedly help Tatsuhiro with his hikikomori problem. On the way home, they realize they have been fooled, and they ultimately confront Megumi at her home, only to find her brother, Yuichi Kobayashi, is actually one of the players who tagged along with Tatsuhiro in the MMORPG "Ultimate Fantasy".
19	"Welcome to the Blue Bird!"; Transliteration: "Aoi Tori ni Yōkoso!" (Japanese: 青い鳥にようこそ!)	November 12, 2006
Megumi tells her tale of woe. Tatsuhiro talks to Yuichi via the game. The Mouse Road Corporation is found out and the leaders are arrested by the police. Megumi does not come home for a few days due to her being arrested, resulting in Yuichi's starvation. Being so hungry, he runs away to beg for food at a local ramen shop and gets hired to deliver. Megumi, without her debts and brother, decides she may go back to college.
20	"Welcome to Winter Days!"; Transliteration: "Fuyu no Hi ni Yōkoso!" (Japanese: 冬の日にようこそ!)	November 19, 2006
Problems with the health of Kaoru's father heralds his return home to the farm where the family has planned his life through to his death. This now means the game project to be presented at the Winter Comiket, otherwise known as FuyuComi, has to be sped up as Kaoru will soon leave Tokyo for good. As reference for a female reaction, Kaoru gets Tatsuhiro to secretly videotape Kaoru's embarrassing confession to Nanako, his love interest, revealing his full otaku ways.
21	"Welcome to the Reset!"; Transliteration: "Risetto ni Yōkoso!" (Japanese: リセットにようこそ!)	November 26, 2006
Tatsuhiro and Kaoru are ecstatic as they review the completed version of the True World eroge they created together. Their enthusiasm is, however, premature as the game sales at the FuyuComi turn out to be quite poor. After packing his things, Kaoru leaves for his hometown the following morning, accompanied by Tatsuhiro who is to be seeing him off at the railway station. Feeling alone, Tatsuhiro falls prey to his delusions of grandeur. Misaki informs Tatsuhiro she'll be testing what he has learned since they began counselling by going out with him to Shibuya during New Year's Eve. Momentarily distracted by his paranoid thoughts, Tatsuhiro loses sight of Misaki and runs into Hitomi.
22	"Welcome to God!"; Transliteration: "Kamisama ni Yōkoso!" (Japanese: 神様にようこそ!)	December 3, 2006
Tatsuhiro and Hitomi spend New Year's Eve together in Tokyo talking about their lives. Tatsuhiro can't help himself from continuously dreaming about being intimate with Hitomi. Misaki beheld Tatsuhiro arm in arm with Hitomi, leading her to the Shibuya train station, where they part ways. Tatsuhiro and Misaki find each other at the train station where he lies about his meeting with Hitomi, sending Misaki into depression. The next day Tatsuhiro gets a call from Yamazaki concerning his new life and that he is superabound with milk and cheese and could send something to Tatsuhiro. Misaki overhears their conversation and runs away. At their next meeting about the existence of God, she reveals that she saw him with Hitomi in Tokyo, but Tatsuhiro is unable to counter the accusation. As he ponders the desperation of the next year, Misaki believes Tatsuhiro is now her prisoner.
23	"Welcome to Misaki!"; Transliteration: "Misaki ni Yōkoso!" (Japanese: 岬にようこそ!)	December 10, 2006
Misaki concocts a quiz for Tatsuhiro about the dying words of famous people, a strange topic to lecture about. After the quiz, they talk about suicide of famous people for a short time. Before she gets ready to leave, she informs him that there is to be a graduation exam the day after, regardless of the weather. The exam involves the two taking a tour around the city, after which the two end up in the usual park again. Misaki informs Tatsuhiro that he has passed the project with flying colors, and pushes another contract toward Tatsuhiro which outlines a relationship between the two. Tatsuhiro declines the contract, concerned about her personal matters. It is later revealed that Misaki collapsed in the bathroom when she returned home, thereby being promptly hospitalized. Misaki's uncle explains to Tatsuhiro concerning Misaki's childhood life, including that of her unstable mother and abusive stepfather. After arriving at the hospital, Tatsuhiro discovers that Misaki abandoned the hospital in preparation for committing suicide.
24	"Welcome to the N.H.K.!"; Transliteration: "N.H.K. ni Yōkoso!" (Japanese: N･H･Kにようこそ!)	December 17, 2006
Tatsuhiro completes his chase to stop Misaki from committing suicide at the cliff where her mother killed herself years earlier. On the outlook of the cliff, in the snow, Misaki attempts suicide only to be stopped by Tatsuhiro. Moments later, Tatsuhiro attempts to commit suicide in a sacrifice to kill the NHK conspiracy he has created as the cause of all of Misaki's problems. While running toward the precipice he realizes he is doing this for the girl he loves. The attempt fails when he falls on a recently installed protective fence. After returning to Tokyo, Tatsuhiro receives letters from Kaoru and Hitomi stating that they have settled into their new lives. After a time, Misaki hands Tatsuhiro an agreement that each will continue to live, and suffer their life's problems, as long as the other one does.
