= Tsukumo =

Tsukumo may refer to:

- Academy Award nominated short within the 2013 film Short Peace
- Tsukumo Station, train station located in Kurihara, Miyagi Prefecture, Japan.
- Hiroko Tsukumo (born 1970), retired Japanese volleyball player
- Tsukumo Happy Soul, Japanese manga written and drawn by Kendi Oiwa
- Yuma's family within the Yu-Gi-Oh! Zexal anime series
- Benben and Yatsuhashi Tsukumo, fictional sister characters in Double Dealing Character from the Touhou Project series

== See also ==
- Tsukumogami
