= Calling You (disambiguation) =

"Calling You" is a song from the film Bagdad Café, covered by Celine Dion.

Calling You may also refer to:

- Calling You (short story collection), a Japanese fictional short story collection by Otsuichi
- Calling You (film), a Japanese film with Riko Narumi
- "Calling You" (Hank Williams song), 1946
- "Calling You" (Blue October song), 2003
- "Calling You", a song by Aqua
- "Calling You", a song by Kat DeLuna
- "Calling You", a song by Richard Marx from Rush Street
