= Goth (2008 film) =

2008 film

- Directed by: Gen Takahashi
- Produced by: Takafumi Ohashi; Shunsuke Yamada
- Starring: Kanata Hongô; Rin Takanashi; Kunihiko Ida; Mika Kamiya; Kôtarô Kano; Chika Kumagai; Toshinobu Matsuo; Keishi Nagatsuka
- Cinematography: Ryuji Ishikura; Shinji Kugimiya
- Release date: 2008
- Running time: 95 min.
- Country: Japan
- Language: Japanese

Goth is a 2008 Japanese drama film directed by Gen Takahashi. The film stars Kanata Hongô, Rin Takanashi, Kunihiko Ida, Mika Kamiya and Kôtarô Kano in the lead roles. It is based on the novel Goth by Otsuichi.

== Plot ==
A young woman sits alone in a park, unmoving and missing her hand. As passersby realize the woman is dead, authorities are contacted. It is speculated that she was murdered by an at-large killer who committed a similar crime two months ago. A schoolgirl, Yoru Morino, observes the crime scene before noticing a schoolboy, Itsuki Kamayama, intently observing as well.

Morino talks with Itsuki after class one day. Acknowledging their mutual interest in death, they decide to investigate the recent murders. Itsuki surmises the killer is an artist of sorts, given his darkly beautiful exhibition of the victims' bodies, and notes how similar Yoru looks to the victims. They later meet by a river, the scene of the first murder, where Itsuki recounts the victims' information. Both were 19-year-old girls who had their left hands severed. Itsuki notices a scar on Yoru's wrist. The next day, his classmates tease him for hanging out with Yoru, who allegedly attempted suicide by slitting her wrist in the past.

While walking their dog one morning, Itsuki's sister Sakura follows the dog into an abandoned building and accidentally discovers the body of a murder victim - another young girl missing her left hand, marking the third incident. Itsuki tells Yoru that Sakura has a strange habit of finding dead bodies. Yoru discusses her own sister, Yu, who was rather gentle and never blamed Yoru for her destructive actions in childhood, such as feeding their dog bleach. She also reveals that Yu accidentally killed herself while recklessly playing with a noose.

At school, Yoru shows Itsuki a notebook supposedly owned by the killer, but refuses to tell him where she found it. Its contents reveal the location of a possible fourth victim. The two follow a hand-drawn map in the notebook, eventually finding the body of yet another young woman with a missing left hand. Itsuki debates handing over the evidence to authorities, but Yoru adamantly insists on keeping the notebook. That night, Yoru has a nightmare about Yu. After school the next day, she takes Itsuki to a store that sells rope and explains that she ties ropes around her neck when she has trouble sleeping. After they briefly investigate the abandoned building where the third murder victim was found, Itsuki notes that their fascination with murders is different - Itsuki is more interested in the killers, while Yoru is obsessed with the victims.

Itsuki and Yoru meet at her favorite cafe, where Yoru is dressed differently than normal; she explains that she modeled her new look after the fourth victim. Itsuki warns her she could be the next victim if she presents herself this way. That night, Yoru receives a cryptic phone call and finds a newspaper clipping in her mailbox regarding Yu's death. Believing that Itsuki is the perpetrator, Yoru ends their friendship.

On the way to school, Yoru gets into a stranger's car. As she does not come to class that day, Itsuki decides to investigate other locations that the killer cited in his notebook. Finding nothing, he decides to stop by the cafe and asks if the owner has seen Yoru. The owner claims he hasn't and, once the only other customer pays and leaves, locks Itsuki in the cafe with him. Itsuki accuses the owner of being responsible for the murders, connecting details about the notebook to the owner's pattern of behavior. Itsuki returns the notebook to him and promises not to report him to the police. The killer hands Itsuki a set of keys and informs him that Yoru is upstairs.

Upstairs, Itsuki finds the killer's tools, the victims' left hands, and an unconscious Yoru. Rather than wake her, Itsuki ties a red rope around her neck. Itsuki returns to school and calls Yoru, who is still at the cafe, addressing her as "Yu." He explains that he learned through old newspaper articles that Yu and Yoru were identical twins, and deduced that Yu assumed her sister's identity after the latter's death. Yu confirms this. Itsuki hangs up, and Yu goes back to sleep with the rope still around her neck, content.

== Cast ==
- Kanata Hongô as Itsuki Kamayama
- Rin Takanashi as Yoru Morino
- Kunihiko Ida
- Mika Kamiya
- Kôtarô Kano
- Chika Kumagai
- Toshinobu Matsuo
- Keishi Nagatsuka
