= Himitsu no Hanazono =

- Genre: Drama
- Directed by: Takashi Komatsu
- Country of origin: Japan
- Original language: Japanese
- No. of episodes: 11

Original release
- Network: KTV, Fuji TV
- Release: January 9 – March 3, 2007

Himitsu no Hanazono (ヒミツの花園) is a 2007 Japanese drama series by KTV, a Kansai-based affiliate of Fuji TV. The show is also known as The Secret Garden or Hanazono's Secret. The theme song is "Baby Don't Cry" by Namie Amuro.

== Plot ==
A 28-year-old magazine editor who is tired of work and feels she doesn't have a life is assigned to be in charge of a very popular cartoonist with a lovely name, Yuriko Hanazono. But as she goes to Hanazono's residence/office, she is met by four men who seem to be her assistants. It turns out the men are brothers who form a team named Yuriko Hanazono by taking roles to create popular comics. The exhausted editor may find the key to being happy while she is being driven crazy by this unique gang of brothers.

== Characters ==
- Kayo Tsukiyama (月山夏世 Tsukiyama Kayo)

== Credits ==
=== Cast ===
- Yumiko Shaku (釈由美子 Shaku Yumiko) - Kayo Tsukiyama
- Masato Sakai (堺雅人 Sakai Masato) - Wataru Kataoka
- Tetsuhiro Ikeda (池田鉄洋 Ikeda Tetsuhiro) - Osamu Kataoka
- Jun Kaname (要潤 Kaname Jun) - Satoshi Kataoka
- Kanata Hongo (本郷奏多 Hongō Kanata) - Hinata Kataoka
- Susumu Terajima (寺島進 Terajima Susumu) - Ichiro Tanaka
- Miki Maya (真矢みき Maya Miki) - Ryoko Kawamura
- Saori Takizawa (滝沢沙織 Takizawa Saori) - Minae
- Rinako Matsuoka (松岡璃奈子 Matsuoka Rinako) - Misuzu Sugimoto
- Tetsushi Tanaka (田中哲司 Tanaka Tetsushi) - Shin'ichi Tamaru
- Yusuke Yamamoto (山本裕典 Yamamoto Yūsuke) - Takumi Tachikawa
- Shunsuke Daito (大東俊介 Daitō Shunsuke) - Miura
- Kei Yamamoto (山本圭 Yamamoto Kei) - Toru Kataoka

=== Staff ===
- Director - Takashi Komatsu (小松隆志 Komatsu Takashi)
- Producers - Hideki Yoshijō (吉條英希 Yoshijō Hideki), Kōichi Tōda (遠田孝一 Tōda Kōichi), Tatsuya Itō (伊藤達哉 Itō Tatsuya)
- Screenwriter - Yūko Nagata (永田優子 Nagata Yūko)
- Music - Kyō Nakanishi (仲西匡 Nakanishi Kyō)

== Episodes ==
#	Episode title	Broadcast date	Ratings
Ep. 1	超人気少女マンガ家の正体は四兄弟だった!	January 9, 2007	14.7%
Ep. 2	仕事をナメるな! お前はクビだ!	January 16, 2007	13.1%
Ep. 3	胸キュン♡したいんです!	January 23, 2007	12.4%
Ep. 4	お金はあるけどヒマはない ハワイ旅行で大ゲンカ!	January 30, 2007	12.1%
Ep. 5	智が消えた!? 花園ゆり子大ピンチ!!	February 6, 2007	12.6%
Ep. 6	ついにその正体が! 花園ゆり子サイン会で大ピンチ!	February 13, 2007	11.0%
Ep. 7	やさしくしないで… 涙と抱擁のワケ	February 20, 2007	12.5%
Ep. 8	兄弟が壊れる時…	February 27, 2007	12.4%
Ep. 9	今すべてを話す時…	March 6, 2007	12.3%
Ep. 10	100% かなわぬ恋	March 13, 2007	12.0%
Ep. 11	サヨナラ 私の花園	March 20, 2007	11.4%

== Others ==
2 works with no relation to this TV series:

- a manga written by Mihona Fujii sharing the same title.
- an anime titled Anime Himitsu no Hanazono broadcast by NHK. An adaptation of Frances Hodgson Burnett's children's novel The Secret Garden.
