= Goth (novel) =

Japanese horror novel by Otsuichi

- Front cover of the manga

ゴス (Gosu)
- Genre: Horror
- Novel
- Written by: Otsuichi
- Published by: Kadokawa Shoten
- English publisher: NA: Tokyopop
- Published: May 30, 2003
- Manga
- Written by: Otsu-ichi
- Illustrated by: Kendi Oiwa
- Published by: Kadokawa Comics
- English publisher: NA: Tokyopop
- Published: 2004
- Feature films
- Goth

GOTH (ゴス, Gosu) is a Japanese horror novel written by Otsuichi about two high school students fascinated by murder. The novel won the Honkaku Mystery Award in 2003. It was adapted into a manga by Kendi Oiwa. In October 2008, they were published in Japan by Kadokawa. Following this, they were published in English by Tokyopop in September, 2008. In 2008, the novel was adapted into a film of the same title directed by Gen Takahashi. The manga and novel was rereleased in North America by VIZ Media in August 2015. The stories were originally published in a single hardcover edition and then later published in the form of two paperback books.

== Plot ==
The novel contains a series of six short stories about two high school students: beginning with a boy called 'Boku (I)' who remains unnamed until late in the story, and a girl named Yoru Morino. Both of them are strongly attracted to the dark side of human beings. Two of them strangely encounter and become involved in a bizarre case.

- Goth (暗黒系, Ankokukei; Dark Type) - Morino finds a diary written by a serial killer. Since it describes a third victim that has yet to be discovered, Morino shows it to a classmate called "Boku", who is the narrator of the story. They then encounter a victim themselves.
- Wristcut (リストカット事件, Risutokatto Jiken; The Wristcut Incident) - There have been horrible incidents of animals and humans who had their hands cut off and stolen. 'Boku' identifies the culprit, coming up with a plan to catch them.
- Dog (犬, Inu; Dog) - The narrator investigates a series of dog kidnappings after his sister discovers a pit filled with their bodies. He finally managed to find out a scene of the crime.
- Twins (記憶, Kioku; Memories) - Morino faces trouble sleeping, and is looking for a rope to put around her neck in the belief the right rope will help her sleep.
- Grave (土, Tsuchi; Soil) - Saeki spends all his free time gardening, digging holes to try to control his obsession with burying people alive. He killed a young neighbor boy, drowning him in his coffin. Now he snatched another female victim and put her in a coffin.
- Voice (声, Koe; Voice) - There was a murder in an abandoned hospital. A few weeks later, a mysterious high school boy gives victim's younger sister a message from the victim, recorded just before she was murdered.

== Characters ==
Itsuki Kamiyama
The narrator. A handsome high school student obsessed with death. States his passions are to "haunt crime scenes to look for details" and to "stand where a body had been not long ago". Yearns to watch Morino's death.
Yoru Morino
A beautiful high school student obsessed with death. She is quiet and shy. Befriends the narrator after an incident involving Mr. Shinohara. Has a glaring white scar on her wrist.
Mr. Shinohara
Morino's science teacher. Has an obsession with hands.
The Cafe Manager
A manager at Morino's favorite cafe. He is never named.
Mr. Saeki
A man who lives near Morino. He's obsessed with burying people alive.
Yū Morino
Yoru's twin sister.
Natsumi Kitazawa
Her older sister was recently murdered, and her world has fallen apart. When a mysterious boy approaches her with a tape of her sister's final words, she can't stop herself from listening.

== Media ==
=== Novel ===
Written by Otsuichi, GOTH was published in Japan by Kadokawa Shoten (ISBN 4-04-873390-7) in 2002, and later released in a two volume bunkobon version named Goth Yoru no Shō (GOTH 夜の章) (ISBN 4-04-425304-8) and Goth Boku no Shō (GOTH 僕の章) (ISBN 4-04-425305-6).

Tokyopop licensed the novel for an English-language release in North America, and published it on October 7, 2008.

=== Manga ===
The manga adaption, by Kendi Oiwa, eliminates the Dog storyline, and combines Voice and Twins, with Morino taking Natsumi's role in the final story. It is licensed by Tokyopop and published on September 9, 2008. It is also licensed in Italy by Planet Manga, in France by Pika Édition, in Germany by Egmont Manga & Anime, and in Russia by Comics Factory.

=== Film ===
Based upon the novel by Otsuichi, Goth is about two morbid high school students who share a fascination with murder. Kamiyama (Kanata Hongō) is an outwardly, friendly and popular boy who hides his potentially sociopathic nature with a carefree, happy attitude. Loner Morino (Rin Takanashi), on the other hand, does little to hide her strange nature; she never smiles, does not interact with her classmates, and wears a long-sleeved, black school uniform even during the middle of summer. While these two seem to share little in common and do not interact with each other in front of their peers, their shared interest in death and murder has turned them into an unusual duo. Initially happy to exchange books on morbid subjects, a series of recent murders spark their interest and they begin investigating the killer. This serial killer has a fondness for cheerful young women and, after severing their left hand as a trophy, displays their dead bodies in public locations to be discovered. After Morino discovers the killer's notebook in a local café, the two use it to see the corpses for themselves before discovery and attempt to discern his identity.
