= Doreiku =

Japanese manga and anime series

- The cover of the first manga volume

奴隷区 僕と23人の奴隷 (Dorei-ku: Boku to 23-nin no Dorei)
- Genre: Psychological thriller
- Manga
- Written by: Shinichi Okada
- Illustrated by: Hiroto Ōishi
- Published by: Futabasha
- Imprint: Action Comics
- Original run: 2012 – 2016
- Volumes: 10
- Novel series

Dorei-ku: Boku to 23-nin no Dorei
- Written by: Shinichi Okada
- Published by: Futabasha
- Original run: November 14, 2013 – March 13, 2014
- Volumes: 3 + 1 extra
- Novel

Doreiku 2nd Shinjuku Kikō Kai
- Written by: Shinichi Okada
- Published by: Futabasha
- Published: June 20, 2014
- Manga

Dai Doreiku: Kimi to 1-Oku 3-Senban no Dorei
- Written by: Shinichi Okada
- Illustrated by: Hiroto Ooishi
- Published by: Futabasha
- Original run: May 27, 2017 – 2019
- Volumes: 4
- Anime television series
- Directed by: Ryōichi Kuraya
- Produced by: Hideaki Suzuki; Yoshihiko Nakaya (Note: Unconfirmed romanization of 仲矢義彦.); Hiroyuki Shimizu; Yuuichi Nakano; Toshimitsu Saegusa; Gō Morita; Takayuki Spacey Yasuda; Toshiyuki Onuma; Shinsaku Hatta; Tomoaki Gomi (Note: Unconfirmed romanization of 五味智明.)
- Written by: Ryōichi Kuraya
- Music by: Naoyuki Osada
- Studio: Zero-G; TNK
- Licensed by: NA: Sentai Filmworks; SEA: Medialink
- Original network: BS11, Tokyo MX, AT-X
- Original run: April 13, 2018 – June 29, 2018
- Episodes: 12
- Manga

Doreiku - Gang Age
- Illustrated by: Takayoshi Kuroda
- Published by: Fujimi Shobo
- Imprint: Dragon Comics Age
- Magazine: Piccoma
- Original run: October 2019 – October 2020
- Volumes: 3
- Live-action film
- Tokyo Slaves

Dorei-ku: Boku to 23-nin no Dorei (Japanese: 奴隷区 僕と23人の奴隷; lit. "Slave District: 23 Slaves and Me") or simply Doreiku, is a Japanese novel series written by Shinichi Okada. A manga adaptation illustrated by Hiroto Ōishi ran for 10 volumes starting in 2012. A live action film was released under the title Tokyo Slaves in 2014, and an anime television series adaptation of the manga animated by Zero-G and TNK aired from April 13 to June 29, 2018.

== Characters ==
Eia Arakawa (荒川 エイア, Arakawa Eia)
Voiced by: Hibiku Yamamura (Japanese); Christine Auten (English)
A street smart girl who isn't afraid of speaking her mind out when it concerns the welfare of her friends. She is a tomboy who is quick-witted and can think fast on her feet when it comes to mind games and is not afraid of taking risk. She is always in the company of her dog Zushioumaru whom she doesn't know was once an experimental subject of Dr. Sumida who invented the "Slave Control Method" (SCM) which was intended to be used on animals such as dogs.
Yūga Ohta (大田 ユウガ, Ōta Yūga)
Voiced by: Ryōta Suzuki (Japanese); David Matranga (English)
A college student who is also a hustler for finding ways to make money and other forms of excitement and adventures, he got involved in the SCM distribution with his partner in crime Shinnosuke Tachikawa, and has soon got on board with the slave trading game where he would gather up other SCM users and beat them in a game of wits with Eia as his accomplice and turn them into his own slaves. For a brief time he becomes Ryuuou's slave after being outwitted in a game, but later was freed when he was sent by the latter to duel an unknown SCM user who turned out to be Eia in disguise who later put on the SCM and has beaten him in a game.
Julia Katsushika (葛飾 ジュリア, Katsushika Juria)
Voiced by: Sayaka Senbongi (Japanese); Patricia Duran (English)
A lonely girl who desired to be loved, her desire also makes her susceptible to being submissive and weak, she worked once as a club hostess whom initially had a relationship with Seiya but was later dumped and kicked out from his life by him after he becomes Ayaka's slave who ordered him to do so. She later becomes Ryuuou's nanny but unbeknownst to her that the latter had planned it from the beginning where she becomes his first slave after he tricked her into putting on the SCM. Though she is ryuuou slave, she does have feeling for him, whereby it is strongly suggested that even without being under the enslavement of the SCM she's be willing to do anything for him.
Seiya Shinjuku (新宿 セイヤ, Shinjuku Seiya)
Voiced by: Hikaru Midorikawa
He is a male club host who a one point had a relationship with Julia, whom he later dumped after an obsessed Ayaka tricked him into putting on an SCM and becomes her slave, he later becomes Yuuga's slave after he and Ayaka were challenged by Yuuga into a game where he intentionally loses so as to get away from Ayaka's control and later becomes one of Ryuuou's slaves.
Ayaka Toshima (豊島 アヤカ, Toshima Ayaka)
Voiced by: Suzuna Kinoshita
She is a club hostess with an eyepatch from another club that specializes in having their hostesses sport cutie attire. She is so obsessed with Seiya that she helps him be the number one host in his club but felt betrayed when she found out that he only used her for monetary purposes and he already had a relationship with a girl, Julia, angered by his betrayal and eager to break his relationship with Julia, he tricked him into putting on an SCM, but later her master and slave relationship ended when they encountered Yuuga and Eia who beat them in a game, where she together with Seiya becomes Yuuga's slave together with Seiya. They later become among Ryuuou's slaves.
Ataru Chūō (中央 アタル, Chūō Ataru)
Voiced by: Katsuyuki Konishi
Lucy Suginami (杉並 ルシエ, Suginami Rushie)
Voiced by: Nozomi Nishida (Japanese); Kira Vincent-Davis (English)
Masakazu Meguro (目黒 マサカズ, Meguro Masakazu)
Voiced by: Yasuhiko Kawazu (Japanese); John Swasey (English)
Shinnosuke Tachikawa (立川 シンノスケ, Tachikawa Shinnosuke)
Voiced by: Showtaro Morikubo (Japanese); Scott Gibbs (English)
Takio Minato (港 タキオ, Minato Takio)
Voiced by: Yusuke Shirai (Japanese); Greg Cote (English)
Sachi Shibuya (渋谷 サチ, Shibuya Sachi)
Voiced by: Hikaru Yūki (Japanese); Shelley Calene-Black (English)
Tsubaki Setagaya (世田谷 ツバキ, Setagaya Tsubaki)
Voiced by: Kazuyuki Okitsu
Shiwori Adachi (足立 シヲリ, Adachi Shiwori)
Voiced by: Sarara Yashima
Taiju Nakano (中野 タイジュ, Nakano Taiju)
Voiced by: Ayumu Murase
Zenichi Bunkyō (文京 ゼンイチ, Bunkyō Zen'ichi)
Voiced by: Tetsu Inada
Zushiōmaru Sumida (墨田 ズシオウマル, Sumida Zushiōmaru)
Voiced by: Kōki Miyata
Maria Chiyoda (千代田 マリア, Chiyoda Maria)
Voiced by: Saki Hayakawa
Gekkō Itabashi (板橋 ゲッコウ, Itabashi Gekkō)
Voiced by: Kengo Kawanishi
Zero Shinagawa (品川 ゼロ, Shinagawa Zero)
Voiced by: Sachi Kokuryu
Muon Nerima (練馬 ムオン, Nerima Muon)
Voiced by: Kenyu Horiuchi
Minami Kita (北 ミナミ, Kita Minami)
Voiced by: Saeko Kamimura

== Media ==
=== Novels ===
Shinichi Okada originally serialized the series as a web novel on the novel submission website Everystar before it was picked up for publication by Futabasha, who published it as three novels between 2013 and 2014. The main series was followed by a side story, Dorei-ku: Boku to 23-nin no Dorei.ex (奴隷区 僕と23人の奴隷 ex.), and a sequel, Doreiku 2nd Shinjuku Kikō Kai (奴隷区2nd. 新宿奇行会), both being released in 2014.

==== Volumes ====
Dorei-ku: Boku to 23-nin no Dorei

No.	Japanese release date	Japanese ISBN
1	November 14, 2013	978-4-575-51631-9
2	January 9, 2014	978-4-575-51644-9
3	March 13, 2014	978-4-575-51661-6

Dorei-ku: Boku to 23-nin no Dorei.ex

No.	Japanese release date	Japanese ISBN
1	May 15, 2014	978-4-575-51677-7

Doreiku 2nd Shinjuku Kikō Kai

No.	Japanese release date	Japanese ISBN
1	June 20, 2014	978-4-575-23867-9

=== Manga ===
In 2012, Hiroto Ōishi launched a manga adaptation of the novels on Everystar, and Futabasha published the series in 10 collected tankōbon volumes. A second manga, Dai Doreiku: Kimi to 1-Oku 3-Senban no Dorei (大奴隷区 君と1億3千万の奴隷), published four volumes, beginning in 2017. In October 2019, Takayoshi Kuroda launched a new manga, titled Doreiku - Gang Age, on Kakao Japan's Piccoma website that was serialized until October 2020.

==== Volumes ====
===== Doreiku =====
No.	Japanese release date	Japanese ISBN
1	December 12, 2012	978-4-575-84171-8
2	April 26, 2013	978-4-575-84224-1
3	August 28, 2013	978-4-575-84281-4
4	December 27, 2013	978-4-575-84328-6
5	May 28, 2014	978-4-575-84416-0
6	October 28, 2014	978-4-575-84519-8
7	March 27, 2015	978-4-575-84602-7
8	September 25, 2015	978-4-575-84685-0
9	May 12, 2016	978-4-575-84801-4
10	October 28, 2016	978-4-575-84874-8

Dai Doreiku: Kimi to 1-Oku 3-Senban no Dorei

No.	Japanese release date	Japanese ISBN
1	May 27, 2017	978-4-575-84976-9
2	November 28, 2017	978-4-575-85071-0
3	April 28, 2018	978-4-575-85148-9
4	March 22, 2019	978-4-575-85285-1

===== Doreiku - Gang Age =====
No.	Japanese release date	Japanese ISBN
1	February 7, 2020	978-4-040-73505-4
2	August 7, 2020	978-4-040-73772-0
3	February 9, 2021	978-4-040-73985-4

=== Live-action film ===
A live-action film starring Sayaka Akimoto and Kanata Hongō premiered in Japan in June 2014.

=== Anime ===
An anime television series adaptation of Ōishi's manga was announced on October 7, 2017. Ryōichi Kuraya directed and wrote the series, and animation was provided by Zero-G and TNK. Junji Goto provided character designs for the series as well as serving as chief animation director. The series aired from April 13 (Note: The series premiered on April 12 at 25:00, which is the same as April 13 at 1:00 AM.) to June 29, 2018. It was broadcast on Tokyo MX and BS11. Netflix streamed the series in Japan. The opening theme is 'Karakara na Kokoro' (カラカラな心, Dried-Up Heart) by Shōgo Sakamoto and the ending theme is 'BJ' by Pile. Sentai Filmworks licensed the series and simulcasted it on Hidive.

No.	Title (Note: The English episode titles are taken from Hidive.)	Original release date
1	"Choice" (Japanese: 選択 -sentaku-)	April 13, 2018
The episode opens with a man commanding a woman to have sex with him after beating her in a game of cards. The story then switches to Eia, whose friend is complaining that her boyfriend left her to date another man. Interested, Eia asks to meet them. When they meet, the boyfriend, Yuuga, says he will explain himself if either of them manage to guess the relationship of a nearby couple. Impressed by Eia's answer, he asks to meet her alone later, where he explains that he was only trying to make the breakup easier. He then shows her a device called Slave Control Method (SCM), which, when worn by two people during a contest, will force the loser into subservience, making them a slave to the winner. Once enslaved by another SCM user, a slave can only be freed on that person's command. He then asks her to become his partner in testing the SCM, so that she can convince his master to release him should he lose a contest and become enslaved. Seeing a chance to change her life, Eia agrees. Meanwhile, a woman named Lucie gets revenge on her rapist by tricking him into wearing an SCM before beating him in a game of pachinko and then torturing him as her slave.
2	"Shackles" (Japanese: 束縛 -sokubaku-)	April 20, 2018
Seiya Shinjuku and Ayaka Toshima have a duel with the game of Rock, Paper, Scissors with Ayaka emerging victorious. Ayaka orders Seiya around to sexually engage with her as revenge for being treated as just a cash cow, and more specifically to further ruin his relationship with his ex-girlfriend Julia Katsushika. The two are challenged to a two-on-two duel with Eia and Yuuga to a game of Thumbs Up. However, it was a trick as Eia was not wearing a SCM and Seiya bails leading to Eia and Yuuga emerging victorious. Yuuga releases the two from their obligations as slaves. That night, Seiya reflects on how the SCM ruined his relationship with Julia, and Julia appears and wins a duel against Seiya after letting go of her hand to make him her slave.
3	"Abuse" (Japanese: 被虐 -higyaku-)	April 27, 2018
Julia reveals that she is now a slave to Ryuuou Edogawa. Shiori Adachi, a worker at a cosplay cafe, and Taiju Nakano, a frequent customer at the cafe, engage in a duel to see whose boyfriend spends the most money on them during their dates. Taiju takes an early lead, but Shiori catches up. However after going to the apartment of one of the boyfriends, Shiori gets drugged and Taiju comes to her rescue when he reveals that he is a man who had wanted to become her slave. With Taiju winning the duel, Shiori becomes her slave, but it does not last long as Zenichi Bunkyou arrives and threatens to kill Shiori if she did not agree to duel him in a punch out contest, thus becoming Zenichi's slave. Taiju gets help from Julia, who was passing by, but had to become her slave if she helped him. Before she could, the dog Zushiohmaru arrives to beat up Zenichi, who is also wearing a SCM.
4	"Plan" (Japanese: 計画 -keikaku-)	May 4, 2018
Prior to his encounter with Shiori and Taiju, Zenichi obtained a SCM device in order to live large. After the encounter, he becomes a slave to Zushiohmaru as he unknowingly agreed to a duel with the dog. Afterwards, Ryuuou's colleague Ataru Chou takes Shiori and Taiju with him to Ryuuou, while sending Zenichi to the hospital. However, Eia takes Zushiohmaru with her as she and Yuuga let Chou know that they are out to release slaves from the SCM. The next day, Zero Shinagawa is approached by a mysterious boy claiming to want revenge against the person who beat up his father causing permanent brain damage. Zero is pressured to agree, and he puts on the SCM engaging in a trivia contest with Chou, who the boy claims to be the criminal, with the boy also participating. However, it was a trap as the boy, revealed to be Ryuuou, was actually the person Zero challenged. Zero loses the duel and becomes Ryuuou's slave.
5	"Puzzle" (Japanese: 困惑 -konwaku-)	May 11, 2018
Ryuuou orders Zero to obey Chuo, but he runs away had to be chased down. A tied-up Zero tells Chuo that a voice in his head told him to run, indicating that there's a potential flaw with the SCM. Sometime later, Zenichi escapes from the hospital and both Yuuga and Ryuuou receive a letter written in blood by someone identifying himself as a crazy person. Yuuga decides that he will challenge him, but Eia objects as she does not approve of Yuuga's approach to add as many slaves as possible. Eia takes Zushiohmaru and decides to end her working relationship. However, she is coerced into working for him again when he threatens to kill Ayaka by having her freeze in the bathtub to circumvent the rule that prohibits killing slaves. Eia reluctantly has Zushiohmaru challenge Ayaka to a duel to eat utensils. Zushiohmaru refuses to eat leading to him becoming Yuuga's slave through Ayaka. Not wanting to see Zushioumaru or Ayaka hurt any further, Eia agrees to work with Yuuga.
6	"Awareness" (Japanese: 自覚 -jikaku-)	May 18, 2018
Zushiohmaru's backstory is explained as he inadvertently ran away from home when he chased a dog he loved. Professor Sumida, who was doing research on the SCM, found him and adopted him. One day, Sumida's colleague Sanegaya drugged him and stole Sumida's research leading him to quit his job as a professor. Zushiohmaru puts on the SCM to get revenge on Sanegaya, but he hasn't met him since. On the next day, Yuuga meets the crazy person, Fujiko Taito, and she drugs him with a substance that gets him to unconsciously challenge her to a duel where the loser is the one who sees their mother first. Yuuga is tied up prompting her mother to see him, thus making Fujiko the winner. That night, Yuuga is challenged to a game of Rock, Paper, Scissors by a masked person, who is revealed to be Eia after beating him in the duel. Eia has since put on the SCM in order to free the slaves that have been taken control by the device, starting with Yuuga.
7	"Servitude" (Japanese: 隷属 -reizoku-)	May 25, 2018
After breaking up with Seiya, Julia was hired by Ryuuou's mother to babysit him while she is out working several jobs to pay off a huge debt. Having been introduced to the SCM, Ryuuou decides to help pay off the debt by taking in slaves. He makes Julia his first slave easily beating her in a game of count up. Fujiko challenges Ryuuou to a game of capture the flag using their team of slaves. Ryuuou wins the duel when he used Julia to shock herself near a pool of water surrounding the flag to prevent Fujiko's slaves from reaching it due to the mechanism that prevents them from following orders that would harm them, thus making Fujiko and her four slaves Ryuuou's slaves.
8	"Discovery" (Japanese: 発覚 -hakkaku-)	June 1, 2018
Julia infiltrates a high school disguised as a student to investigate the star-shaped SCM that appears on the map, while Fujiko also foes disguised as the school's substitute nurse. There, they find out that the SCM user is Setagaya, and he has the Judgment SCM that can instantly enslave SCM wearers without a duel. Julia and Fujiko would become Setagaya's slaves as a result. Meanwhile, Eia challenges the wealthy businessman Muon Nerima to a duel seeking his fortune to free the slaves. The two duel to see who makes the most money in two hours. Eia makes money being a street performer with one of her slaves giving her a ton of money, while Nerima gathers all the available assets from his company's stores. Then Yuuga disguises himself as a loan shark to loan him 10 million yen. Thinking that he had more than enough to win, Nerima stops gathering assets, however the loaned money burns just moments before the deadline leading to Eia winning, thus making Nerima her slave.
9	"Intersection" (Japanese: 交錯 -kousaku-)	June 8, 2018
Gekkou Itabashi is a huge fan of the internet sensation Maria-sama, who is revealed to be Maria Chiyoda. Gekkou goes over to see Maria, and gets challenged to a duel by Zero in a game of Look That Way. Zero wins, however Gekkou is not enslaved to Ryuuou as Zero ends up getting possessed by his late mother Kiyo Koto. Kiyo reveals that being a slave allowed her to possess Zero and is determined to release him from slavery before passing on. Maria reveals that she met Kiyo in prison and became close friends.
10	"Fall" (Japanese: 転落 -tenraku-)	June 15, 2018
Ryuuou's background is explained as he got into this game to pay off a huge debt burdened to his mother, and he did so after doing extensive research into SCMs. After enslaving Julia, he became close friends with her. Eia and Ryuuou meet each other and have a casual conversation after Ryuuou lost all of his slaves having fallen into Setagaya's trap leaving him desperate to rescue Julia. Meanwhile, Maria is approached expecting to see Gekkou, but instead meets up with masked man named Nobito who challenges her to a due to dodge his shots, and Nobito wins to enslave her.
11	"Harvest" (Japanese: 収穫 -syukaku-)	June 22, 2018
Eia and Yuuga question Nerima about Setagaya's plan and the Judgment SCM when they receive a text from Setagaya. The text is a declaration of war against Eia's group, sending a picture of a captured Sachi and telling them to meet at a warehouse at midnight. The team arrives early to retrieve Sachi before Setagaya is ready, but Setagaya planned for this and traps them in a hole in the floor. Yuuga saves Eia before she falls into the trap, while the rest of the team becomes Setagaya's slaves. At a hotel room, Setagaya reveals to Fujiko that the Judgment SCM uses classical conditioning to trick the opponent's brain into thinking that it has lost by amplifying the noise an SCM makes after a normal duel loss. This means that an SCM user that has never lost before won't be affected by the Judgment SCM. The hotel is then raided by Takio, who reveals that he had previously enslaved Fujiko and got her to give him the information Setagaya had told her. Takio tortures Setagaya and forcibly enslaves him, resulting in Takio being in control of 18 slaves.
12	"Explosion" (Japanese: 起爆 -kibaku-)	June 29, 2018
Takio tortures all of his slaves for his entertainment. Meanwhile, Eia meets with Shinnosuke to discuss how they will defeat Takio and rescue all of his slaves. The two are approached by Ryuuou, who offers his help. Kiyo serves as an informant to Eia, revealing the location of Takio's hideout. Eia, Ryuuou, and Shinnosuke arrive at an abandoned school and Eia is successfully able to infiltrate the building, surprising Takio and challenging him to a duel: whoever begs for his life, loses. Takio's slaves are able to apprehend Eia and he accepts the duel as she is now in a vulnerable position. Takio has other guards patrolling the area, including Yuuga, who ends up finding Shinnosuke poorly hidden in a corner. Shinnosuke was planting explosives, which go off and set a massive fire in the school. Shinnosuke and Yuuga fight while the rest of Takio's slaves start disobeying his orders as their lives are now in danger. Yuuga reveals that Takio's female slaves are trapped in the basement. Kiyo takes control of Zero's body and frees Eia. Shinnosuke arrives and takes Eia, Takio, and Kiyo and jumps out of the window to escape the building. This causes Takio to cry for help, resulting in his duel loss to Eia. Ryuuou finds the basement, but the door is locked and he is unable to break it down. Chuo and Seiya arrive and break it down for Ryuuou, freeing the women. Everyone gathers outside, where Ryuuou reveals that he still hasn't lost a duel. Eia challenges him to a coin flip, which she wins. With everyone now in Eia's control, she declares that there will be no more duels and releases everyone from slavery. Yuuga promises to pay back Shinnosuke despite the money being burned, and Julia promises to help Ryuuou save his mother. Nerima, overhearing this, decides to release Ryuuou's mother as a way to repay him for saving his life. Takio is Nerima's captive, and Nerima orders a search for Setagaya, who escaped in the commotion. Eia throws her SCM in the air and says goodbye.

== Reception ==
As of December 2017, the series had 3.2 million copies in print.
