= Tokyo Slaves =

- Film poster
- Directed by: Sakichi Satō
- Written by: Sakichi Sato; Hidehiro Ito
- Based on: Doreiku by Shinichi Okada
- Starring: Sayaka Akimoto; Kanata Hongō
- Release date: 28 June 2014
- Running time: 100 minutes
- Country: Japan
- Language: Japanese
- Box office: NT$940,000 (Taipei)

Tokyo Slaves (奴隷区 僕と23人の奴隷, Doreiku Boku to 23nin no Dorei) is a 2014 Japanese suspense thriller film directed by Sakichi Satō and starring Sayaka Akimoto and Kanata Hongō, based on the manga Doreiku by Shinichi Okada. It was released on 28 June 2014.

== Cast ==
- Sayaka Akimoto
- Kanata Hongō
- Hikaru Ōsawa
- Yūki Yamada
- Sayuri Anzu
- Ayumi Orii
- Takahiro Kuroishi
- Yuki Kubota
- Kanta Ogata
- Miyuki Torii
- Yôsuke Saitô

== Reception ==
The film has grossed NT$940,000 in Taipei, Taiwan.
