= Tatsuhiko Takimoto =

Japanese author

- 滝本 竜彦
- Born: September 20, 1978 (age 48)
- Occupation: Novelist
- Writing career
- Genre: Fiction
- Subjects: Hikikomori, Otaku
- Notable work: Welcome to the N.H.K.

Tatsuhiko Takimoto (滝本 竜彦, Takimoto Tatsuhiko; born September 20, 1978) is a Japanese author best known for his novel Welcome to the N.H.K.

== Career ==
Welcome to the N.H.K. began as a single novel by Takimoto with a cover illustration by Yoshitoshi ABe, which was published by Kadokawa Shoten on January 28, 2002 (and on English in 2007). The story was later adapted as a manga series, also written by Takimoto, with art by Kendi Oiwa. The manga began serialization on June 24, 2004, in the magazine Shōnen Ace, also published by Kadokawa Shoten. The manga ended serialization in June 2007, with eight complete volumes released. The series was also adapted as a 24-episode anime television series, which aired in Japan between July and December 2006.

Takimoto wrote two Afterwords published in various editions of his novel. In the first afterword, dated December 2001, he stated that he was a hikikomori and was still recovering: "the themes addressed in this story are not things of the past for me but currently active problems." In a second Afterword, dated April 2005, Takimoto admitted that he had not written "a single new story" since N.H.K. and that he was "reduced to a NEET... living as a parasite on the royalties from this book." He stated that he felt "completely unable to write" and "incapacitated."

Several novels he has serialized (in magazines like Faust) have had their collections delayed for several years while he revises them extensively.

Takimoto's first novel, Negative Happy Chainsaw Edge was published in 2001 and received a special category award at the fifth Kadokawa Gakuen Awards. It was adapted as a live-action Japanese film in 2007, starring Megumi Seki and Hayato Ichihara. A manga adaptation with artist Saiki Junichi was released in Monthly Shōnen Jump.

Takimoto participated in "Live at Faust," an anthology published by the Japanese literary magazine, Faust. Takimoto contributed a ~30 page story and part of a collaboratively written "relay novel" along with four other young writers.

== Works ==
- Negative Happy Chainsaw Edge (2001)
- Welcome to the N.H.K. (2002)
- Chojin Keikaku (2003)
- Ecco (2004)
- Boku no Air (2010)
- Moo no Shōnen (2011)
- Light Novel (2018)
- Rebuild of Welcome to the NHK (2021)
