= Kenji Oiwa =

Japanese manga artist

Kenji Oiwa 大岩ケンヂ
- Area: Manga artist

Kenji Oiwa (大岩ケンヂ, Ōiwa Kenji) is a Japanese manga artist. Some of his major works include Goth, Welcome to the N.H.K., a one-shot, Tsukumo Happy Soul published in Monthly Shōnen Ace, Kadokawa Shoten's manga magazine, and the manga serialization of Assassin's Creed IV: Black Flag.
