= Calling You (short story collection) =

2001 book by Otsuichi

- Cover of the original Japanese release of the novel

きみにしか聞こえない (Kimi ni Shika Kikoenai)
- Genre: Supernatural
- Light novel
- Written by: Otsuichi
- Published by: Kadokawa Shoten
- English publisher: NA: Tokyopop
- Imprint: Sneaker Bunko
- Published: May 31, 2001
- Manga
- Written by: Otsuichi
- Illustrated by: Setsuri Tsuzuki
- Published by: Kadokawa Shoten
- English publisher: NA: Tokyopop
- Published: December 25, 2003
- Live-action film
- Directed by: Ogishima Tatsuya
- Written by: Otsuichi
- Studio: Toei Company
- Released: June 13, 2007
- Runtime: 107 minutes
- Live-action film

Kids
- Directed by: Ogishima Tatsuya
- Written by: Otsuichi
- Studio: Toei Company
- Released: February 2, 2008
- Runtime: 109 minutes

Calling You (Japanese: きみにしか聞こえない, Hepburn: Kimi ni Shika Kikoenai; lit. "Nobody Can Hear Me But You") is a Japanese fictional short story collection written by Otsuichi and published on May 31, 2001, by Kadokawa Shoten. All three stories in Calling You are stories focused on unusual friendships with a supernatural twist. In December 2003, a manga adaptation written and illustrated by Setsuri Tsuzuki was published by Kadokawa. The Calling You manga only includes the first two stories of the novel, and makes some changes to both of those stories. Both the novel and manga adaptations were given an English language release in North America by Tokyopop.

The first story from Calling You has been adapted into a drama CD that was released by Kadokawa Shoten on June 28, 2003. Toei Company has adapted both the first and second stories into feature films. Both films are directed by Ogishima Tatsuya. Calling You was released to theaters on June 13, 2007, while Kids was released on February 2, 2008.

== Plot ==
Calling You (きみにしか聞こえない, Kimi ni Shika Kikoenai)

Ryo is a high school freshman who tends to take people's words literally. After being hurt several times because she misunderstood someone, she avoids people. She creates an imaginary cell phone, feeling it would be pointless to buy one when no one would call. One day while she is on the bus, however, her imaginary cell phone begins to ring. At the other end is a boy named Shinya who is also calling with an imaginary cell phone. Ryo is shocked and after they disconnect, she tries calling people and connects with a college student named Yumi, who instructs her in the ways of imaginary phones. Though Shinya lives an hour in the past from Ryo, they talk regularly through their imaginary phones, staying constantly connected. Through their friendship, Ryo is able to find her voice and begin talking in the real world. They eventually talk on the real phone, and decide to meet. Ryo takes a bus to the airport, but a car nearly runs her over. Shinya pushes her out of the way and is struck instead. In the ambulance, Shinya dies. Ryo calls Shinya in the past. She tries to save him by saying she hated him on sight, but he sees through her and gets her to admit what happened. He is determined to save her, so they frantically say their good-byes.

Ryo goes to his funeral and afterwards finds his locker where he left a cassette radio he'd promised her. Ryo also realizes that Yumi is really her future self.

Kiz/Kids (傷, kizu)

An unnamed Boy is put in the special class at school after he attacks a classmate who teased him about the burn mark on his back. The Boy's father regularly abused him, including leaving the burn on his back by throwing an iron at him. His mother abandoned him, and he now lives with an aunt and uncle he feels don't care anything about him. In the class, he meets Asato, a quiet boy who rarely talks. Asato's mother murdered his father and then tried to kill Asato as well. While alone with Asato after school, the Boy hurts himself carving. Asato comes over and touches him, and half the wound leaves the boy's arm and moves to Asato's so that they are equally sharing the pain. They become friends that day, and begin exploring the depths of Asato's powers. After Asato removes a scrape from a little boy's knee, the child's mother treats them to ice cream. At the parlor, they meet Shiho, a young woman with a burned face who hides her scars behind a mask. When a kid the Boy had pushed out of a window breaks his arm with a baseball bat, Asato takes that wound as well, but then moves it to the kid with the bat. The Boy decides Asato should move all of his wounds to his father, who is lying unconscious and dying in the hospital. Whenever gets new injuries, the Boy would take Asato there to use his father's dying body as a "dumping ground." Eventually, they share the secret of Asato's powers with Shiho and she asks Asato to remove the burn for just three days so she can remember what its like to live without it. She leaves town afterward, however, and Asato sinks into a depression. No one can stand looking at him with the scar on his face, even the Boy, so they go to the hospital to give it to the Boy's father. However, when the arrive, they find he had just died. The Boy cries for him, and asks Asato to move all the scars back from his father's body to him instead. Asato says he can't and runs, and the Boy realizes Asato had never given any of the wounds to his father after all. Asato runs from through the hospital, curing everyone he touches and taking on their wounds. The Boy realizes Asato wants to die because he thinks no one wants him. Outside, he takes on the fatal wounds of an accident victim, but the Boy convinces him to give him half, just like the day they became friends, so that they could share the pain equally. The wounds are serious and both spend a long time in the hospital, but during the stay the Boy comes to the conclusion that Asato was given the power because he had a pure heart, and that he wants Asato to always know someone is there willing to share his pain.

Flower Song (華歌, Hana Ka)

A patient at a hospital finds a flower with the face of a girl, that hums a beautiful melody.

== Media ==
=== Light novel ===
Written by Otsu-ichi, Calling You is a Japanese light novel consisting of a collection of three supernatural short stories.

No.	Original release date	Original ISBN	English release date	English ISBN
1	May 31, 2001	978-4-04-425302-8	June 12, 2007	978-1-59816-852-5

=== Drama CD ===
An eleven-chapter drama CD based on the novel series was released in Japan on June 28, 2003, by Kadokawa Shoten as part of their Sneaker CD Collection line. The cover art is illustrated by Miyako Hasumi.

=== Manga ===
No.	Original release date	Original ISBN	English release date	English ISBN
1	December 2003	978-4-04-853706-3	January 9, 2007	978-1-59816-931-7

=== Films ===
The first short story from the novel series was adapted into a motion picture by Toei Company. It premiered in theaters in Japan on June 13, 2007. Directed by Ogishima Tatsuya, Calling You stars Narumi Riko and Koide Keisuke in the roles of the story's central characters Aihara Ryo and Shinya Nozaki, who also performed those roles in the drama CD. The film was released to Region 2 DVD on December 7, 2007, by Media Factory. The theme song for the film "Calling You" was performed by the musical group Dreams Come True. The CD soundtrack, containing twenty tracks including the theme song, was released on June 13, 2007, by Nayutawave Records.

The second short story, Kiz/Kids, was also being adapted into a motion picture entitled Kids. Also produced by Toei, this second film is also directed by Tatsuya and was released to theaters on February 2, 2008.
