= Otsuichi =

Japanese writer and filmmaker (born 1976)

Otsuichi 乙一
- Born: Hirotaka Adachi (安達 寛高); October 21, 1978 (age 47); Fukuoka Prefecture, Japan
- Education: Toyohashi University of Technology
- Occupation: Novelist
- Spouse: Tomoe Oshii (m. 2006)
- Relatives: Mamoru Oshii (father-in-law)
- Writing career
- Pen name: Otsuichi (乙一); Asako Yamashiro (山白 朝子); Eiichi Nakata (中田 永一); Yuushi Mamoragi (枕木 憂士)
- Language: Japanese
- Period: 1996 –
- Genres: Detective literature Horror fiction
- Notable work: Goth (2002) (『GOTH リストカット事件』)
- Notable awards: JUMP Novel Grand Prix (1996); Honkaku Mystery Award (2003) 小学館児童出版文化賞 (2012)
- Website: shueisha.co.jp/otsuichi

Signature
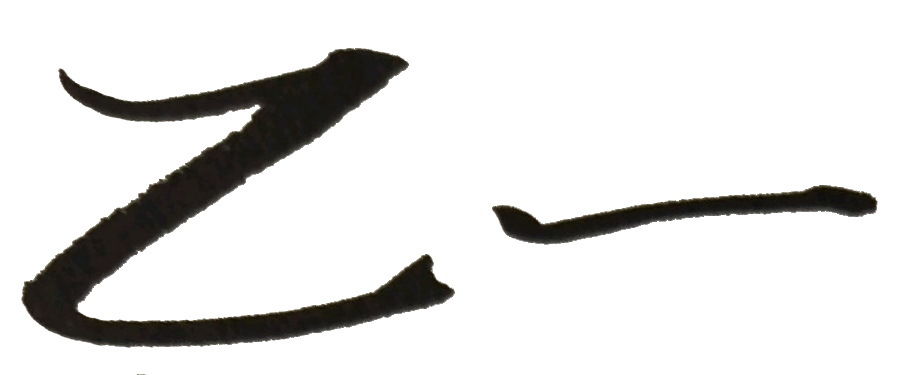

Otsuichi (乙一, Otsuichi) is the pen name of Hirotaka Adachi (安達 寛高, Adachi Hirotaka; born October 21, 1978), a Japanese writer and filmmaker. He is a member of the Mystery Writers of Japan and the Honkaku Mystery Writers Club of Japan.

He made his debut with Summer, Fireworks and My Corpse while still in high school. Major works include the novel Goth, which was adapted into a comic and a feature film and the Zoo short story collections which were also adapted into a feature film. Goth won the 2003 Honkaku Mystery Award.

Tokyopop has published English-language translations of his short story collection Calling You, the novel Goth and the comic adaptations of both. Another short story, "F-Sensei's Pocket", appears in the English edition of the literary magazine Faust.

== Career ==
Otsuichi was born on October 21, 1978, in Tanushimaru (now part of Kurume), Fukuoka Prefecture, the eldest son of a family of four with his parents and two older sisters. He attended Kawai Elementary School and during his later years there, he became overweight, surpassing 60 kilograms. This led to Otsuichi getting bullied and gaining an inferiority complex, which he used playing video games alone to deal with. After Kawai, he attended Kurume Shiritsu Tanushimaru Junior High School. At the age of 14, he decided to go on a diet, and was elected class president in the third year of junior high school. Despite this, he still felt inferior to his classmates.

In 1994, he entered the National Institute of Technology, Kurume College. Despite calling the 5 years at the college "the gloomiest in all of his life," during summer vacation when he was around 15 years old, he read the first volume of the light novel series Slayers by Hajime Kanzaka which he borrowed from a friend and discovered his love of reading, and began dabbling into the world of light novels and manga. For the next year and a half, Otsuichi read as many light novels as he could get his hands on either from friends or his older sisters, while also encountering mystery novels such as Takemaru Abiko's Satsuriku ni taru Yamai, Yukito Ayatsuji's The Decagon House Murders and Sōji Shimada's Detective Kiyoshi Mitarai series.

He started writing his own novels when he was 16 years old. To qualify for the Fujimi Fantasia Novel Awards, Otsuichi starting writing an isekai fantasy novel, but feeling that it was not going well, he decided to rewrite the setting to a rural town nearby where he grew up. This reworked novel was called Summer, Fireworks and My Corpse and it won the 6th JUMP Novel Grand Prix award in 1996 after a strong endorsement from Kaoru Kurimoto, making his official debut at only 17 years old.

In 1999, he graduated from the National Institute of Technology, Kurume College, and transferred to the Department of Ecology Engineering, Toyohashi University of Technology, and started living on his own in Toyohashi, Aichi Prefecture. At university, he belonged to a science fiction research group.

In 2002, Otsuichi graduated from Toyohashi University. This year, one of his most known work, Goth, was published and the following year, it won the 3rd Honkaku Mystery Award. In 2003, he moved from Toyohashi to the vicinity of Tokyo's Gakugei-daigaku Station, and a few months later to the vicinity of Musashi-Nakahara Station in Kawasaki, Kanagawa Prefecture.

At that time, Otsuichi was invited by an editor to watch the sound editing of Mamoru Oshii's Ghost in the Shell 2: Innocence. There, he met Oshii's daughter Tomoe Oshii who was a writer for the film, and the two later got married in 2006. In February 2007, they moved from Kawasaki. In 2010, the couple had a child together.

== Style and influence in the field ==
In his early career, Otsuichi's works could be described as mainly short stories with interesting ideas and heartwarming light novels. Furthermore, some of his early work were horror or sad stories, named Black Otsuichi and White Otsuichi respectively. However, Goth, one of the work he is most known for, was a highly acclaimed mystery novel, even winning the Honkaku Mystery Award.

Under the name Otsuichi, his work has been published mainly by Shueisha, Kadokawa Shoten (now KADOKAWA), and Gentosha.

Describing his writing process, Otsuichi says he first decides on the storyline and then creates characters to match it. In addition, he adopted movie scriptwriting techniques from a book called Shinario Nyūmon (シナリオ入門) shortly after his debut. In particular, his stories tend to have a turning point at the midpoint and many of his works are divide into four or even sixteen parts.

His wife, Tomoe Oshii, says that Otsuichi is "not obsessed with [using] either novels or movies [as a medium in telling a story]." Otsuichi himself says that he "just enjoys working on his works as they take shape."

In 2012, Kono Mystery ga Sugoi! Award of Excellence winner Hitsuji Tomoi self-described himself as a "serious Otsuichi fan" and said that reading and studying Otsuichi's work inspired him to become a novelist.

== Otsuichi and light novels ==
Light novels have a peculiar position in the publishing world, according to Otsuichi. "None of the editors I've known read light novels." This is connected to how light novels are perceived as lesser compared to other forms of literature, a fact which Otsuichi only learned after becoming active in the publishing industry. When he debuted, there were no awards for light novels.

Otsuichi wrote and published Goth as a light novel to introduce people who only read light novels to the mystery genre in the hope of expanding the horizons of readers to other forms of literature.

== Works in English translation ==
- Calling You (original title: Kimi ni shika kikoenai: Kōringu Yū), trans. Agnes Yoshida (TokyoPop, 2007)
  - Calling You
  - Kiz/Kids
  - Flower Song
- Goth (original title: Gosu: Risutokatto jiken), trans. Andrew Cunningham (TokyoPop, 2008 / VIZ Media, 2015)
- Zoo (original title: Zū), trans. Terry Gallagher (VIZ Media, 2009 / Shueisha English Edition, 2013)
  - Zoo
  - In a Falling Airplane
  - The White House in the Cold Forest
  - Find the Blood!
  - In a Park at Twlilight, a Long Time Ago
  - Wardrobe
  - Song of the Sunny Spot
  - Kazari and Yoko
  - SO-Far
  - Words of God
  - Seven Rooms
- Summer, Fireworks, and My Corpse (original title: Natsu to hanabi to watashi no shitai), trans. Nathan Collins (VIZ Media, 2010)
  - Summer, Fireworks, and My Corpse
  - Yuko
  - Black Fairy Tale
- Summer, Fireworks, and My Corpse (original title: Natsu to hanabi to watashi no shitai), trans. Nathan Collins (Shueisha English Edition, 2013)
  - Summer, Fireworks, and My Corpse
  - Yuko
- Black Fairy Tale (original title: Ankoku dōwa), trans. Nathan Collins (Shueisha English Edition, 2013)

Short story

- F-sensei's Pocket (original title: F sensei no poketto), trans. Andrew Cunningham, illustrated by Takeshi Obata (Faust 1, Del Rey, 2008)
- Where the Wind Blows (original title: Mado ni fuku kaze), trans. Andrew Cunningham, illustrated by Takeshi Obata (Faust 2, Del Rey, 2009)
- Firestarter Yukawa (original title: Faiasutātā Yukawa-san), trans. Matt Treyvaud, illustrated by KEI (Kindle Single, 2015) written under the name Eiichi Nakata

== Awards and nominations ==
Japanese Awards

- 1996 – Weekly Shōnen Jump Novel Award: Summer, Fireworks, and My Corpse
- 2003 – Honkaku Mystery Award for Best Fiction: Goth
- 2004 – Nominee for Yamamoto Shūgorō Prize: Zoo

U.S. Award

- 2009 – Nominee for Shirley Jackson Award for Single-Author Collection: Zoo

== Bibliography ==
=== Novels or short story collections ===
- Summer, Fireworks and My Corpse (Shueisha, 1996: ISBN 4-08-703052-0, Shueisha bunko, 2000: ISBN 4-08-747198-5)
  - Summer, Fireworks and My Corpse
  - Yuko
- Tentei Yōko (Shueisha, 1998: ISBN 4-08-703070-9, Shueisha bunko, 2001: ISBN 4-08-747342-2)
  - A Masked Ball – Or, the appearance and disappearance of the bathroom smoker
  - Tentei Yōko
- Ishi no Me (Shueisha, 2000: ISBN 4-08-702013-4)/Heimen Inu (Shueisha Bunko, 2003: ISBN 4-08-747590-5)
  - Ishi no Me
  - Hajime
  - Blue
  - Heimen Inu
- Shissō Holiday (Kadokawa Sneaker Bunko, 2001: ISBN 4-04-425301-3)
  - Happiness is a Warm Kitty
  - Shissō Holiday
- Calling You (Kadokawa Sneaker Bunko, 2001: ISBN 4-04-425302-1)
  - Calling You
  - Kiz/Kids
  - Flower Song
- Ankoku Dowa (Shueisha, 2001: ISBN 4-08-702014-2, Shueisha Bunko, 2004: ISBN 4-08-747695-2)
- Shinizokonai no Ao (Gentosha Bunko, 2001: ISBN 4-344-40163-8)
- Kurai tokoro de machiawase (Gentosha Bunko, 2002: ISBN 4344402146)
- Goth Wristcut Case (Kadokawa Shoten, 2002: ISBN 4-04-873390-7) – the winner of the 3rd Honkaku Mystery Award
  - Goth
  - Wristcut
  - Dog
  - Twins
  - Grave
  - Voice
- Goth Yoru no Shō (Kadokawa Bunko, 2005: ISBN 4-04-425304-8)
  - Goth
  - Dog
  - Twins
- Goth Boku no Shō (Kadokawa Bunko, 2005: ISBN 4-04-425305-6)
  - Wristcut
  - Grave
  - Voice
- Samishisa no Shūhasū (Kadokawa Sneaker Bunko, 2003: ISBN 4-04-425303-X)
  - Mirai Yoho Ashita, Harereba ii
  - Te o Nigiru dorobō no Monogatari
  - Film no naka no Shōjo
  - Ushinawareta Monogatari
- Zoo (Shueisha, 2003: ISBN 4-08-774534-1)
  - Kazari to Yōko
  - Ketsueki wo Sagase!
  - Hidamari no Shi
  - So-far
  - Tsumetai Mori no Shiroi Ie
  - Closet
  - Kami no Kotoba
  - Zoo
  - Seven Rooms
  - Ochiru hikoki no Naka de
- Zoo 1 (Shueisha Bunko, 2006: ISBN 4-08-746037-1)
  - Kazari to Yōko
  - Seven Rooms
  - So-far
  - Hidamari no Shi
  - Zoo
- Zoo 2 (Shueisha Bunko, 2006: ISBN 4-08-746038-X)
  - Ketsueki wo Sagase!
  - Tsumetai Mori no Shiroi Ie
  - Closet
  - Kami no Kotoba
  - Ochiru Hikoki no Naka de
  - Mukashi Yuhi no Kōen de (Not included in the original edition of Zoo. Originally appeared on Otsuichi's now defunct website.)
- Ushinawareru Monogatari (Kadokawa Shoten, 2003: ISBN 4-04-873500-4, Kadokawa Bunko, 2006: ISBN 4-04-425306-4)
  - Calling You
  - Ushinawareru Monogatari
  - Kiz/Kids
  - Te wo Nigiru Dorobō no Monogatari
  - Happiness is a Warm Kitty
  - Maria no Yubi
  - Boku no Kashikoi Pantsu-kun (Only in bunko edition)
  - Usokano (Only in bunko edition)
- Gun and Chocolate (Kodansha Mystery Land, 2006: ISBN 4-06-270580-X)

=== Picture book ===
- Kutsushita o Kakuse! (Kobunsha, 2003: ISBN 4-334-92414-X)

=== Essays ===
- Shosei Monogatari (Gentosha, 2004: ISBN 4-344-00655-0)
  - Collection of essays written for the web
- Toruko Nikki ~ Dame Ningen Sakka Trio no Datsuryoku Tabi Nikki~ (Shueisha, 2006: ISBN 4-08-780424-0)
  - Serialized on the web, heavily revised; in tandem with Shinji Sadakane and Makoto Matsubara.

== Uncollected Stories ==
- Ugoku Omocha (Shosetsu Subaru, August 2000)
- Tsuma no Denwa (Shosetsu Subaru, August 2000)
- Kamikakushi (Shosetsu Subaru, August 2000)
- Shufuku sareta Mizu (Da Vinci, November 2002)
- Kaidan (Akumu seigyo Sochi horror anthology, November 2002)
- F-Sensei no Pocket (Faust vol. 2, 2004)
- Kodomo ha Tōku ni Itta (Faust vol. 4, 2004)
- Dare ni mo Tsuzukanai (Faust vol.4, 2004)
  - A relay novel written with Takekuni Kitayama, Yuya Sato, Tatsuhiko Takimoto and Nisio Isin.
- Mado ni fuku Kaze (Faust vol.6 Side-A, 2005)
- Kono ko no e wa Mikansei (Nanatsu no Kuroi Yume, March 2006)
- Utopia (Light novel o kaku!, August 2006)

== Manga ==
- Hajime (Weekly Shonen Jump)
  - Script. Art by Takeshi Obata. Two part short story, appeared in Jump in 2003.
- Misshitsu Kanojo (2006, gekidan, Yukiko Mototani)
  - Planning. Not published, but his plot in script for was distributed at performances.
- Shonen Shojo Horyuki (Shosetsu Subaru)
  - Script. Art by Usamaru Furuya.

== Movies ==
His movie work is often done under his real name.

- Nikako no Hitomi (2002)
  - Directed by Keisaku Sato. Script by Keisaku Sato and Hirotaka Adachi.
- Pool de Oyoda Kaerimichi (2002)
  - 5-minute-long short film. Written and directed by Hirotaka Adachi.
- Rittai Tokyo (2007)
  - Scheduled to be shown at the Yubari Ouen Eigasai. Directed by Hirotaka Adachi.

== JoJo's Bizarre Adventure novelization ==
In 2000, it was announced that Otsuichi would be writing a novel set during the fourth arc of JoJo's Bizarre Adventure. The novel proved difficult to complete; in Kono Mystery ga Sugoi 2004, Otsuichi claimed to have written over 2000 pages, but thrown them all out. Intent on writing a novel that lived up to the manga, it took him until 2007 to complete it.

- The Book: JoJo's Bizarre Adventure 4th Another Day.

== Adaptations ==
=== Movies ===
- Te o nigiru Dorobo no Monogatari (2004)
  - Made for web, released on DVD
- Zoo (2005)
  - Anthology film, covering five of the stories in the Zoo short story collection. Kazari to Yoko, Seven Rooms, So-far, Hidamari no Shi, and Zoo. Hidamari no Shi was animated; each film had a different director.
- Kurai tokoro de Machiawase (2006)
- Calling You (2007)
- Kids (2008)
- Goth (2008)

=== Manga ===
- Goth (Monthly Shonen Ace)
- -Kiz/Kids- (Asuka)
- Calling You (Asuka)
  - These two were collected as Calling You and published in English by Tokyopop.
- Kimi ni shika Kikoenai (Shonen Ace)
- Shinizokonai no Ao (Mystery Bst.)
  - Collection from Gentosha comics, collectsion Shinisokonai no ao, Kurai tokoro de Machiawase, and Happiness is a Warm Kitty.
- Zoo (Young Jump Special Mankaku)
  - Collection contains Kazari to Yoko, Kami no Kotoba, Youdamari no Shi, and Zoo.
- Shisso Holiday (Beans Ace)
- Shonen Shojo Hyonikki (Shueisha)
  - Collects the serial from Shosetsu Subaru. The authors name is given as Furuya x Otsuichi x Usamaru

=== Drama CD ===
- Calling You (2003, Sneaker CD Collection)

=== TV Drama ===
- Shisso Holiday
  - Broadcast from February 10, 2007, on Terebi Asahi
- Ultraman Geed
- My Daemon
  - Broadcast from November, 2023, on Netflix
