= Tsukumo Happy Soul =

Japanese manga by Kendi Oiwa

99(ツクモ)ハッピーソウル
- Manga
- Written by: Kendi Oiwa
- Magazine: Shōnen Ace
- Original run: July 2003 – October 2003
- Volumes: 1

Tsukumo Happy Soul (99(ツクモ)ハッピーソウル) is a Japanese manga written and drawn by Kendi Oiwa. It was serialized in Shōnen Ace in 2003, from July to October, later becoming a 172-page tankoban.

== Plot ==
When an object is cherished for 99 years a deity is born within that object; also known as a Tsukumo deity. Yukiji's companion, Tamakichi, is a deity; he was born from a certain item her mother left behind. As Yukiji enters Mizuhozaka Girls' Academy Tamakichi constantly puts in a troublesome appearance. Yukiji's hopes for a good school life looks dimmer and dimmer.

== Characters ==
Shinazuki Tamakichi: A perverted Tsukumo whose object he comes from is a pink vibrator with a happy face, the blunt of many jokes in the chapters. You find out many of his habits right off the bat as he threatens to wake Yukiji up by "fondling her boobs".

Shinazuki Yukiji: A teenage girl who goes to an all-girls school with another side she doesn't find out about until she meets another girl with a deity in her headband, despite it focusing around her. She seems to have a short temper only with Tamakichi, and even then, he always tells her that she's very patient. Yukiji is referred to as 'Sleeping Beauty' or 'Sleeping Princess' by Tamakichi, because she's the Tsukumo Master that many have been looking for or trying to hide. It is hinted at that she's on the Student Council.

Mitsuki: An eccentric girl who takes out her emotions on others with her Tsukumo or cellphones, Kei. She is stopped from killing the perverted Vice-Principal by Tamakichi.

Furukawa Miku: A girl who has a Tsukumo of the headband she wears all the time, named Popuri.
