= Welcome to the N.H.K. =

Japanese novel series

- Novel cover, featuring Misaki Nakahara

N・H・Kにようこそ! (N.H.K. ni Yōkoso!)
- Genre: Black comedy; Psychological drama; Slice of life
- Novel
- Written by: Tatsuhiko Takimoto
- Illustrated by: Yoshitoshi Abe
- Published by: Kadokawa Shoten
- English publisher: NA: Tokyopop
- Published: January 28, 2002
- Manga
- Written by: Tatsuhiko Takimoto
- Illustrated by: Kenji Oiwa
- Published by: Kadokawa Shoten
- English publisher: NA: Viz Media
- Magazine: Monthly Shōnen Ace
- Original run: December 26, 2003 – May 26, 2007
- Volumes: 8
- Anime television series
- Directed by: Yūsuke Yamamoto
- Produced by: Makoto Chiba; Hidemasa Arai; Satoshi Matsui
- Written by: Satoru Nishizono
- Music by: Pearl Brothers
- Studio: Gonzo
- Licensed by: Crunchyroll; AUS: Siren Visual; NA: ADV Films (expired); UK: MVM Films
- Original network: Chiba TV, TV Saitama, tvk, KBS, GBS, WTV, TVN, MTV, HOME
- English network: NA: Anime Network; SA: Animax; SEA: Animax Asia
- Original run: July 9, 2006 – December 17, 2006
- Episodes: 24
- icon

Welcome to the N.H.K. (Japanese: N・H・Kにようこそ!, Hepburn: N.H.K. ni Yōkoso!) is a Japanese novel written by Tatsuhiko Takimoto. It was published by Kadokawa Shoten in Japan in January 2002, and in English by Tokyopop in October 2007. The story revolves around Tatsuhiro Sato, a 22-year-old hikikomori, an asocial recluse, who gets aid from a strange girl who seems to know a lot about him, despite never having met him before. Common themes throughout the story deal with depression, anxiety, isolation, existential dread, the hardships of life and how people must deal with them in their own way. The novel profusely analyzes the hikikomori phenomenon, which is relatively widespread in Japan.

Welcome to the N.H.K. was adapted into a manga series, also written by Takimoto, with art by Kendi Oiwa. The manga was serialized between June 2004 and June 2007 in Kadokawa Shoten's manga magazine Shōnen Ace. The manga's forty chapters have been collected into eight bound volumes released in Japan and overseas. The English edition of the manga is published by Tokyopop, and the first volume was released in October 2006. The novel was also adapted into a 24-episode anime television series by Gonzo which aired in Japan between July and December 2006 on Chiba TV. In North America, the series was licensed for English release by ADV Films, who released it on DVD in 2007. In 2008, the anime became one of over 30 ADV titles acquired by Funimation.

In Japan, NHK refers to the Japan Broadcasting Corporation (Nippon Hōsō Kyōkai), Japan's national public broadcaster, but within the series the main character believes it stands for Nihon Hikikomori Kyōkai (日本引きこもり協会; The Japanese Hikikomori Association), which is a reference to the protagonist's claim of a subversive conspiracy led by NHK (the real-life broadcaster) to create hikikomori. While it mainly deals with the phenomenon of hikikomori, the plot also explores many other Japanese subcultures—for example otaku, lolicon, and Internet suicide pacts.

== Plot ==
=== Story ===
Welcome to the N.H.K. revolves around the lives of several young adults all living in or around the city of Tokyo. Many different lifestyles are shown though most of the time the story focuses on the concepts of being a hikikomori (a reclusive individual who withdraws from society), anime otaku, and having most of the characters experience intense feelings of depression and loneliness.

The main protagonist is Tatsuhiro Satō, a university dropout entering his fourth year of unemployment. He leads a reclusive life as a hikikomori, ultimately coming to the conclusion that this happened due to some sort of conspiracy. One day, just when his life seems entirely unchanging, he meets Misaki Nakahara, a mysterious girl who claims to be able to cure Tatsuhiro of his hikikomori ways. She presents him with a contract which states that once a day they would meet in the evening in a local park where Misaki would lecture to Tatsuhiro in an effort to rid him of his lifestyle. During these outings, many subjects are discussed, though they almost always pertain in some way to psychology or psychoanalysis. One of their first meetings in fact deals with interpreting Tatsuhiro's recent dreams. Both Tatsuhiro and Misaki, however, have a tendency of over-doing things, such as hiding the truth, especially from each other and themselves. Despite Misaki's offer and pressing attempts at salvation, it is Tatsuhiro's neighbor and high school friend, Kaoru Yamazaki, whom Tatsuhiro often turns to in moments of need and support. Despite his own idiosyncrasies, Yamazaki is one of the more stable characters in the story.

The plots within the novel, manga and anime are each rather different from one another, and many themes and personalities differ between each. The novel also regularly mentions drug use by the main character, and later, his friend, Yamazaki. This element of the story is downplayed in the manga (drugs Satō uses are referred to as "legal psychedelics purchased off the internet"), and, asides alcohol, left out of the story altogether in the anime (with the exception of Hitomi). This is likely due to several reasons, including a more public-friendly rating, as well as ultimately being unneeded for the progression of the plot. The references to lolicon that are present within the novel and manga have also been downplayed within the anime, where most of the women the characters lust after are of mature age, although brief hints still remain.

==== N.H.K. ====
The Nihon Hikikomori Kyōkai (N.H.K.) (日本ひきこもり協会) of Satō's imagination is supposedly a sinister conspiracy which aims to turn people into hikikomori and NEETs. No clear reason why they would do this is offered, although Satō considers the potential of an "army" of displaced individuals, and it is mentioned that hikikomori are created for the purpose of giving society someone to look down upon, making themselves feel superior. The majority of the N.H.K.'s work is done through the media, via broadcasting anime and other material that is likely to turn the viewer into an otaku. Throughout the series, many shots of advertising hoardings or movie posters incidentally displayed in other locations bear N.H.K. references.

Satō on occasion also believes that the N.H.K. takes a more active role via the use of agents, although of course these agents only appear in dream sequences or flashbacks. Three types of N.H.K. agents are seen: the first are classic Men in Black who appear to have the ability to disguise themselves as anyone else they wish. They occupy key roles in a target's life, ensuring that they fail to develop. The second are cute, or more precisely moe girls who directly break the hearts of targets or who, via celebrity status, induce targets to have impossible or unrealistic expectations of relationships, destroying their ability to develop them in the real world (Satō never considers how, or even if, the N.H.K. would target women). Satō at one point fears that Misaki may be an agent of this type. The final type of agents are bizarre goblin-like creatures who are grey all over but for a letter (usually "N", "H" or "K") written in yellow on their belly. These creatures appear to be the masterminds of the entire N.H.K. conspiracy, but more likely than not they are Satō's mental image of the spreading mindset or circumstances he associates with the N.H.K. In the novel, it is hinted that Tatsuhiro may not actually believe the conspiracy to exist but instead needed an imaginary enemy to vent his frustrations on and to help motivate him into overcoming his hikikomori ways.

The real-life public broadcaster NHK, which is the source of the abbreviation that is parodied by the series, really does provide a support website for real-life hikikomori. In the manga and novel, a concrete link between the public broadcaster NHK and Satō's Nihon Hikikomori Kyokai is implied; in the anime, although the conspiracy is still named NHK, no such correspondence is drawn and it appears that the NHK does not even exist as a broadcaster in the anime's version of Japan (in the anime, Misaki has never heard of the acronym when Satō says it to her). This may have been because the anime was broadcast on TV channels operated by other Japanese broadcasting companies, thus implying that it related to the real TV company and could have been interpreted as slander against a competitor.

==== Puru Puru Pururin ====
Puru Puru Pururin (プルプルプルリン) is a fictitious magical girl anime of which Kaoru Yamazaki is a fan, featured only in the anime version (in the novel, Yamazaki is a fan of the real-world show Ojamajo Doremi, which is replaced by Puru Puru Pururin in the anime). It is never explicitly stated, but strongly suggested, that Satō believes this series to be controlled by the N.H.K.; in fact, it is after seeing an episode of the series which inspires him to think up the N.H.K. as a concept. The series had a real website, which further suggested this. For example, although it appears to be a children's style of series, the schedule on the website suggested that it is shown almost daily in the small hours of the morning, when children would not be awake, but hikikomori frequently are. Although the website listed the names of several real-world broadcast channels which supposedly carry the show, none of them are operated by the real-world NHK, again suggesting that in the anime's version of Japan, the N.H.K. is not a broadcasting company and is a conspiracy spanning all media. The listed broadcast times and channels are in fact the times at which the Welcome to the N.H.K. anime aired.

Only brief excerpts of Puru Puru Pururin are ever seen, and it is not possible to guess what powers the main character, Pururin, would have. It appears that Pururin is a good, heroic character and is assisted by a number of animated household objects, including a vacuum cleaner upon which she flies; her trademark is to randomly append the word Purin to the end of sentences, similar to Dejiko in Di Gi Charat. The theme song first heard in the first episode is sung by Rumi Shishido. This theme appears in ringtone version throughout the series.

=== Characters ===
Tatsuhiro Satō (佐藤 達広, Satō Tatsuhiro)
Voiced by: Yutaka Koizumi (Japanese); Chris Patton (English)
The story's protagonist is a 22-year-old hikikomori of nearly four years. He is highly unstable, easily manipulated, obsessive, and often blames the N.H.K. conspiracy, a fabrication of his mind, for his shortcomings. He lives in a rented apartment, but depends on his parents' allowance to live. Within the novel and manga, he engages in fairly hard drug use, which is the cause of his delusional visions, although this does not occur within the anime. Near the beginning of the series he finds out one of his few high school friends, Kaoru Yamazaki, has been living next door to him for quite some time. Yamazaki's influence inadvertently makes Sato become an otaku. Sato also decides to help Yamazaki on the creation of a gal game by writing the script. However, the reason for accepting the writing task was initially to get a girl he met, Misaki Nakahara, off his back. Misaki wants Sato to participate in her project, a therapy of sorts. Although he was extremely reluctant at first, he eventually agrees to take part in Misaki's project, albeit not treating it seriously at first. As they spend more time together he quickly falls in love with her, but is afraid to show it since he knows so little about her despite the fact she knows so much about him. His paranoia drives him to tail Misaki one day to find out where she lives. The result of the expedition reveals that Misaki lives on a nearby hill which gives her a perfect view of Sato's apartment as well as the park where they meet for their sessions. Again driven by paranoia, he tries to save himself from potential betrayal by claiming he doesn't want to see her ever again. Shortly thereafter, Sato accidentally becomes involved in a suicide party but ends up being the closest one to go through with it. Yamazaki and Misaki talk him out of it, and he resumes Misaki's project, but his feelings for her have become platonic rather than amorous. Near the end of the series, Sato's true feelings for her are revealed when Misaki makes up another contract that will bind them together as a couple forever. Despite how he feels, he rejects the contract thinking that he has to protect her from his own condition, and believing she deserves someone much better than he is even if it would mean that he reverts to being a hikikomori. Later, Sato finds a suicide note from Misaki, but because of an earlier conversation he knows where she will be. Sato eventually finds Misaki and confesses the truth that he needs and loves her in an attempt to prevent her from going through with the suicide. In the end, they decide to continue their relationship while Misaki finishes her high school equivalency, and they go to college together. In the closing scene Sato signs a new contract proposal from Misaki that binds their actual lives together.
Misaki Nakahara (中原 岬, Nakahara Misaki)
Voiced by: Yui Makino (Japanese); Stephanie Wittels (English)
A mysterious girl who claims to be a volunteer from a "charity project" to help hikikomori like Tatsuhiro. She has the tendency to lie and hides facts such as the fact that she dropped out of high school, but she does not mean any harm. She tells Tatsuhiro whatever it takes to make him pay attention to her and seems to have a deep attachment to him. She makes a contract with Tatsuhiro in order to believe that she is needed by somebody and therefore not an unwanted person who only makes others around her unhappy. Although not the case in the manga, it is explained within the anime that her biological father died when she was very young and her mother died by falling off the cape in her hometown. After her mother's death, she was forced to live with her abusive stepfather who constantly beat her. Due to this experience, when Tatsuhiro is about to hit her following the events at the island, she flinches by instinct. She loves Sato and tries to make it seem like he needs her more but in reality she is even more lonely than he is to the point where she attempts to commit suicide after Sato refuses her feelings in a second contract she makes. She is seen at the end of the anime getting help from Sato to finish her high school degree, so that she and Sato can go and finish college in order to start their life (relationship) officially together. Misaki's personality greatly differs between the manga and the novel and anime; in the manga she appears more sarcastic and doesn't hesitate to reprimand Tatsuhiro, even showing a more manipulative, controlling side, while in the novel and anime, she has an introverted personality and is portrayed to be more innocent.
Kaoru Yamazaki (山崎 薫, Yamazaki Kaoru)
Voiced by: Daisuke Sakaguchi (Japanese); Greg Ayres (English)
Tatsuhiro's former kouhai (junior) in high school, who is an otaku. Tatsuhiro once stood up for him when he was still in middle school being beaten up by some bullies, since then, he respects Tatsuhiro greatly and decided to join the literature club with him when he went into high school. Although appearing to be very mellow, he has a tendency to lash out at those who anger him. He seems to be disappointed with the current state of Tatsuhiro. He is currently Tatsuhiro's neighbor and a college student aspiring to be a game creator. He made Tatsuhiro join his dōjin soft eroge project, and was also responsible for turning Tatsuhiro into an otaku. His family owns a sizable farm in Hokkaidō. Later, he is forced to return to the farm due to his father's sickness; at that point, realizing he has no hope of continuing any aspect of his life in Tokyo, he drives away his crush, Nanako. In the end of the story, he is living happily at his parents' farm and also dating a girl who looks exactly like Nanako whom he hopes to marry in the future. In the manga, his counterpart tends to be more openly absorbed with lolicon and introduced Sato to illicit drugs as well as other schemes.
Hitomi Kashiwa (柏 瞳, Kashiwa Hitomi))
Voiced by: Sanae Kobayashi (Japanese); Luci Christian (English)
Tatsuhiro's senpai in high school, now a public servant. Due to stress, Hitomi develops a dependence on drugs. Hitomi met Tatsuhiro when she persuaded him to join the Literature Club, though most of the time they only ever played cards. She has always been fascinated by the concept of conspiracy theories and is one of the reasons Tatsuhiro suspects the conspiracy against himself by the N.H.K. Also, it is noted in both the anime and novel that she had sex with Tatsuhiro during the last day of school before she graduated because Tatsuhiro kept her company in literature club for her last two years of high school. She attempts a suicide through an internet suicide pact called the Offline Meeting Notice. However, she changes her mind after her boyfriend proposes to her. She gets married and has a healthy child, though on the New Year's Eve before her marriage she asks Tatsuhiro if he wants to have an illicit affair with her in a nearby love hotel. Tatsuhiro declines and reminds her that since she's happy she should have a good life.
Megumi Kobayashi (小林 恵, Kobayashi Megumi)
Voiced by: Risa Hayamizu (Japanese); Monica Rial (English)
Tatsuhiro's classmate in high school, who was the class representative back then. They meet frequently in manga, but neither of them realizes the existence of each other until later. After her father died, she had to work in order to support herself and her brother, who is also a hikikomori, though she ended up entangled in a shady pyramid scheme. During school, she had a very uptight personality about which Tatsuhiro commented to her face. After high school, she retains much of this personality, though she has also become somewhat manipulative in order to survive. She develops a lack of empathy to others and is not beyond exploiting anyone, including friends, to meet ends. After the pyramid scheme ends and her brother gets a job, she thinks about going back to college.

== Media ==
=== Novels ===
Welcome to the N.H.K. is a 192-page novel written by Tatsuhiko Takimoto, with the cover drawn by Yoshitoshi Abe. It was first serialized on the website “Boiled Eggs Online” from January 29 to April 16, 2001, and then published as a novel on January 28, 2002, in Japan by Kadokawa Shoten, with a bunko edition following in 2005. A sequel novel titled the Rebuild of Welcome to the NHK was released over 2021 through 2024, comprising six chapters.

=== Manga ===
The manga series is illustrated by manga author Kendi Oiwa. It was serialized in Kadokawa Shoten's manga magazine Shōnen Ace between December 26, 2003, and May 26, 2007. The manga's forty chapters have been collected into eight bound volumes released in Japan. Tokyopop licensed the manga for release in English, and the first volume was published on October 10, 2006. The manga version diverges from the original version later in the story. After Tokyopop's license expired, Viz Media picked up the series in 2015.

In November 2005, the limited edition of the fourth Japanese volume was published with a Misaki figurine which caused sales of the manga to skyrocket, and was once ranked third at Japan's Amazon website in terms of sales. The limited edition of the sixth volume, released in November 2006 in Japan, included the hard copy of the bishōjo game from the manga, True World: Shinjitsu no Sekai. The game was authored by Tatsuhiko Takimoto, the characters designed by Kendi Oiwa and produced by Circus (famous for D.C.: Da Capo). The limited edition of the eighth volume included a postcard featuring Misaki congratulating the recipient for graduating from being a hikikomori. The manga volume included with limited edition of the 8th volume is unchanged save for the inclusion of the postcard.

=== Anime ===
A 24-episode anime adaptation produced by Gonzo and directed by Yusuke Yamamoto aired in Japan between July 9 and December 17, 2006, on Chiba TV and on later dates on other JAITS stations. Hiroshima Home Television, a local ANN station in Hiroshima, aired the series from July 16 to December 23, 2006. The series was coordinated by Satoru Nishizono, featured character design by Takahiko Yoshida, and the music was headed by Masao Fukuda. ADV Films licensed the anime for $240,000 and released the first DVD of the English edition in October 2007. In 2008 the English license was transferred to Funimation. Siren Visual has licensed the series for release in Australia and New Zealand.

The anime has four pieces of theme music; two opening themes and two ending themes. The first opening theme, "Puzzle" (パズル, Pazuru) was written by Rieko Ito, composed by Kitagawa Katsutoshi, and performed by Round Table featuring Nino. The second opening theme is a remix of the first entitled "Puzzle (extra hot mix)" (パズル－extra hot mix－) which was produced by the same people as with the first opening theme. The first ending theme used for episodes one through twelve, "Odoru Akachan Ningen" (踊る赤ちゃん人間; lit. "Dancing Baby Humans"), was written by Kenji Otsuki, composed by Fumihiko Kitsutaka, and featured vocals by Otsuki and Kitsutaka. The second ending theme used for episodes thirteen through twenty-four, "Modokashii Sekai no Ue de" (もどかしい世界の上で; lit. "On Top of a Frustrating World"), was written and composed by Yugo Sasakura, arranged by Masanori Shimada, and performed by Yui Makino.

== Reception ==
A. E. Sparrow of IGN gave the novel a nine out of ten while comparing it to Catcher in the Rye, saying "there's enough Holden Caulfield, or even Tyler Durden, in Satou and the events that surround him to make this story a solid read for anyone interested in books that examine the human condition."

The manga version of Welcome to the N.H.K. was also positively reviewed. Writing for Anime News Network, Carlo Santos rated the Tokyopop releases of the third manga volume with a B grade for story, an A− for art, and an A− overall. Speaking on the volume's art, Santos noted "it's endlessly entertaining to watch the parade of shocked, disturbed and stressed-out faces as Satou confronts each of society's ills," as well as highlighting the "detailed backgrounds" and "clean, rectangular layouts and frequent speedlines." Concerning the writing, "the dialogue is full of vigor and wit, with a straightforward tone that conveys mad outbursts, tearful breakdowns, and everything in between." And with regards to the adaptation, Santos praised the volume by writing "out of Tokyopop's many, many translations, this series stands among one of their best, if not the best." Santos was more couched in his approval for the fourth volume, giving it a C+ for story, an A− for art, and a B grade overall. While criticizing that "the plot has taken a vacation," he wrote that "those who are into NHK for the highly developed character drama, however, will find these chapters to be some of the most memorable yet," and concluded "it may not be the best or most entertaining volume of NHK, but it does serve its purpose, which is to deepen the story and make the characters even more dysfunctional and twisted than they already are."

The anime series was generally well received by critics. In his review for Animation World Magazine, James Brusuelas wrote "Welcome to the NHK is a true anime gem," describing it as "a delicately human tale." He went on to praise the series, saying "This is more than just anime. This is film." Concluding his review, he remarked "I cannot recommend this series enough. It is perhaps the best anime I saw during 2008."
