= NHK Spring Company =

Japanese spring manufacturer

NHK Spring Co., Ltd.
- Company type: Public KK
- Traded as: TYO: 5991
- Industry: Automotive
- Founded: (September 1939; 86 years ago)
- Headquarters: 3-10, Fukuura, Kanazawa-ku, Yokohama, Japan
- Key people: Kenji Sasaki (Chairman of the Board); Kazumi Tamamura (President and CEO)
- Products: Suspension springs; Precision springs; Car seats; Industrial machinery; Security technologies & services
- Revenue: ▲US$ 5.53 billion (FY 2013) (¥ 569.71 billion) (FY 2013)
- Net income: ▲US$ 239.74 million (FY 2013) (¥ 24.67 billion) (FY 2013)
- Number of employees: 21,215 (consolidated as of 31 March 2013)
- Website: Official website

NHK Spring Co., Ltd. (日本発条株式会社, Nippon Hatsujō Kabushiki-gaisha), commonly called as NHK Nippatsu (NHKニッパツ), is regarded as one of the world's leading spring manufacturers. NHK also makes seats for automobiles, suspension systems for disk read-and-write heads used in hard-disk drives, industrial machinery & equipment and security services.

The company shares its initials, NHK, with the Japan Broadcasting Corporation, although it registered its trademark before the establishment of the latter organization.

The company is listed on the first section of the Tokyo Stock Exchange and has 51 subsidiaries, 23 in Japan and 28 overseas.
