= Bōkyaku Tantei =

Japanese novel series

- Cover of the eighth novel, featuring Kyōko

忘却探偵
- Genre: Mystery, romance
- Novel series
- Written by: Nisio Isin
- Illustrated by: Vofan
- Published by: Kodansha
- Imprint: Kodansha Bungei
- Original run: October 15, 2014 – present
- Volumes: 15
- Manga

Okitegami Kyōko no Bibōroku
- Written by: Nisio Isin
- Illustrated by: Yō Asami
- Published by: Kodansha
- Magazine: Monthly Shōnen Magazine
- Original run: August 6, 2015 – March 6, 2017
- Volumes: 5
- Television drama

Okitegami Kyōko no Bibōroku
- Directed by: Tōya Satō; Yoshinori Shigeyama; Naoko Komuro
- Written by: Akiko Nogi
- Studio: AX-ON
- Original network: NTV
- Original run: October 10, 2015 – December 12, 2015
- Episodes: 10

Bōkyaku Tantei (Japanese: 忘却探偵; lit. 'The Forgetful Detective') is a Japanese mystery novel series written by Nisio Isin and illustrated by Vofan. It has been published by Kodansha since October 2014 under their Kodansha Bungei label. A manga adaptation by Yō Asami titled Okitegami Kyōko no Bibōroku (掟上今日子の備忘録; Kyoko Okitegami's Memo), after the first novel, was serialized in Kodansha's Monthly Shōnen Magazine from August 2015 to March 2017. It was collected in five tankōbon volumes. A Japanese drama adaptation also titled Okitegami Kyōko no Bibōroku aired for 10 episodes on NTV from October to December 2015.

== Synopsis ==
=== Setting ===
Kyōko Okitegami is a detective with a unique trait; her memory resets each time she falls asleep. Despite this challenge, she is able to solve cases brought to her by clients in nearly a day. The story is divided into two distinct sections. The first section is a longer story in which a young man named Yakusuke Kakushidate, who has been falsely accused, plays the role of the sidekick. In the second section, a short story, Kyōko Okitegami plays the role of the sidekick.

== Characters ==
Kyōko Okitegami (掟上 今日子, Okitegami Kyōko)
Played by: Yui Aragaki
Kyōko Okitegami is the protagonist of the story and the head of the Okitegami Detective Agency. Her exact date of birth is unknown, but she proclaims herself to be 25 years old. Kyōko is known as the "fastest detective" due to her ability to solve highly confidential cases within a day, and she is also referred to as the "forgetful detective" due to her anterograde amnesia. She loses her memory the moment she falls asleep, which makes her suitable for such cases. To compensate for her memory loss, Kyōko writes information about herself and the case on her arms, legs, and stomach with a magic pen. She is willing to stay up all night for as many days as necessary to solve the case. Kyōko has a keen sense of money, including gratuities. Her name, 今日子, means today-child, alluding to the character only remembering the current day.
Kyōko resides and works in a three-story building, which serves as both her office and her home. The building has various security checks, and it takes an hour to get to the entrance of the parlor. She typically wears modest clothing, but on occasions, she wears revealing clothes that show a lot of skin. She has a reputation for never wearing the same outfit twice.
It is rumored that Kyōko lost her memory after a certain point in her life, which she keeps as a trade secret. Before that time, she remembers some things, such as the books she was reading, but she does not remember who she was. She also remembers some of her physical experiences after she became this way.
In Kyōko's bedroom, there is bold and rough handwriting in black paint on the ceiling, which is not her own, saying: "From today on, you are Kyōko Okitegami. You will live as a detective." This is the first thing she sees when she wakes up in the morning. As she continues to work as a detective according to this text, she is looking for the person who wrote it.
Kyōko appears in Mazemonogatari, a crossover novel with the Monogatari series. She also appears in the fifth volume of the Pretty Boy Detective Club series, Story of the Panorama Island, in the section "White-Hair Beauty". She gives Mayumi false theories about an art-theft case that happened at a certain museum.
Yakusuke Kakushidate (隠館 厄介, Kakushidate Yakusuke)
Played by: Masaki Okada
The narrator is a character who appears in some of the novels beginning with the first volume. He is 25 years old and has a height of over 190cm. Yakusuke is often falsely accused and has been involved in many cases since childhood. Despite his timid nature, he is unable to do anything wrong or tell lies. To clear his name, he seeks help from various detectives, including Kyōko Okitegami. Yakusuke has difficulty finding a stable job and frequently moves from one location to another.
He harbors romantic feelings for Kyōko, and is always taken aback when she greets him with "Nice to meet you" every time he seeks her assistance.

== Production ==
Nisio expressed his interest in writing mystery stories during the time he was working on Koyomimonogatari. He noted that many of his recent works at the time had become more elaborate in terms of rhetoric and dialogue, and therefore he wrote this series with less emphasis on those areas. Nisio also mentioned that Okitegami Kyōko no Bibōroku has similarities with his debut novel, Kubikiri Cycle: The Blue Savant and the Nonsense User, as the protagonist Kyōko could have easily fit into the setting of his first novel, and he viewed it as a return to his roots.

The character design for the series, Vofan, stated that Nisio had a broad audience in mind for the series, so he designed the characters to focus more on fashion and have a warmer, more inviting feel, as opposed to Monogatari, which he considered to have a more male-oriented audience.

Nisio revealed in the afterword of Okitegami Kyōko no Kansatsuhyō that he has planned a total of 24 volumes for the series.

== Media ==
=== Novels ===
No.	Title	Release date	ISBN
01	Okitegami Kyōko no Bibōroku (掟上今日子の備忘録)	October 15, 2014	978-4-06-219202-6
"Chapter 1: Pleasure to Meet You, Kyōko-san" (初めまして、今日子さん); "Chapter 2: Let Me Introduce Myself, Kyōko-san" (紹介します、今日子さん); "Chapter 3: Are You Free, Kyōko-san" (お暇ですか、今日子さん); "Chapter 4: Pardon Me, Kyōko-san" (失礼します、今日子さん); "Chapter 5: Farewell, Kyōko-san" (さようなら、今日子さん)
02	Okitegami Kyōko no Suisenbun (掟上今日子の推薦文)	April 23, 2015	978-4-06-219450-1
"Chapter 1: Kyōko-san Appraises" (艦定する今日子さん); "Chapter 2: Kyōko-san Presumes" (推定する今日子さん); "Chapter 3: Kyōko-san Advises" (推薦する今日子さん)
03	Okitegami Kyōko no Chōsenjō (掟上今日子の挑戦状)	August 19, 2015	978-4-06-219712-0
"Chapter 1: Okitegami Kyōko's Alibi Testimony" (掟上今日子のアリバイ証言); "Chapter 2: Okitegami Kyōko's Closed Room Lecture" (掟上今日子の密室講義); "Chapter 3: Okitegami Kyōko's Code Table" (掟上今日子の暗号表)
04	Okitegami Kyōko no Yuigonsho (掟上今日子の遺言書)	October 6, 2015	978-4-06-219784-7
"Chapter 1: Kakushidate Yakusuke Being Hospitalised" (入院する隠館厄介); "Chapter 2: Kakushidate Yakusuke Requesting" (依頼する隠館厄介); "Chapter 3: Kakushidate Yakusuke Guiding" (案内する隠館厄介); "Chapter 4: Kakushidate Yakusuke Listening" (拝聴する隠館厄介); "Chapter 5: Kakushidate Yakusuke Waiting" (待機する隠館厄介); "Chapter 6: Kakushidate Yakusuke Confronting" (対面する隠館厄介); "Chapter 7: Kakushidate Yakusuke Revisiting" (再訪する隠館厄介); "Chapter 8: Kakushidate Yakusuke Questioning" (質問する隠館厄介); "Chapter 9: Kakushidate Yakusuke Writing" (執筆する隠館厄介)
05	Okitegami Kyōko no Taishokunegai (掟上今日子の退職願)	December 17, 2015	978-4-06-219906-3
"Chapter 1: Okitegami Kyōko's Dismembered Corpse" (掟上今日子のバラバラ死体); "Chapter 2: Okitegami Kyōko's Jumping Off Corpse" (掟上今日子の飛び降り死体); "Chapter 3: Okitegami Kyōko's Strangulated Corpse" (掟上今日子の絞殺死体); "Chapter 4: Okitegami Kyōko's Drowned Corpse" (掟上今日子の水死体)
06	Okitegami Kyōko no Kon'intodoke (掟上今日子の婚姻届)	May 17, 2016	978-4-06-220071-4
"Introduction (序章): Okitegami Kyōko's Lecture Meeting" (旋上今日子の講演会); "Chapter 1: Kakushidate Yakusuke, Interviewing" (隠館厄介、取材を受ける); "Chapter 2: Kakushidate Yakusuke, Being Hated" (隠館厄介、嫌われる); "Chapter 3: Kakushidate Yakusuke, Being Threatened" (隠館厄介、脅される); "Chapter 4: Kakushidate Yakusuke, Being Liked" (隠館厄介、好かれる); "Chapter 5: Kakushidate Yakusuke, Rejecting" (隠館厄介、断る)
07	Okitegami Kyōko no Kakeibo (掟上今日子の家計簿)	August 23, 2016	978-4-06-220270-1
"Chapter 1: Okitegami Kyōko's Cui Bono" (掟上今日子の誰がために); "Chapter 2: Okitegami Kyōko's Narrative Trick" (掟上今日子の叙述トリック); "Chapter 3: Okitegami Kyōko's Psychological Experiment" (掟上今日子の心理実験); "Chapter 4: Okitegami Kyōko's Handwriting Analysis" (掟上今日子の筆跡鑑定)
08	Okitegami Kyōko no Ryokōki (掟上今日子の旅行記)	November 17, 2016	978-4-06-220376-0
"Chapter 1: First Day" (一日目); "Chapter 2: Second Day" (二日目)
09	Okitegami Kyōko no Urabyōshi (掟上今日子の裏表紙)	May 24, 2017	978-4-06-220576-4
"Introduction (序章): Okitegami Kyōko's Arrest Play" (掟上今日子の逮捕劇); "Chapter 1: Okitegami Kyōko's Investigation Room" (掟上今日子の取り調べ室); "Chapter 2: Kakushidate Yakusuke's Kyōko-san Lecture" (隠館厄介の今日子さん講義); "Chapter 3: Okitegami Kyōko's Jail Cell" (掟上今日子の留置場); "Chapter 4: Kakushidate Yakusuke's Journalism" (隠館厄介のジャーナリズム); "Chapter 5: Okitegami Kyōko's Electrical Chair" (掟上今日子の電気椅子); "Chapter 6: Kakushidate Yakusuke's Room Visiting" (隠館厄介の面会室); "Chapter 7: Okitegami Kyōko's Secret Exposure" (掟上今日子の秘密の暴露); "Chapter 8: Okitegami Kyōko's Government Official Obstructing" (掟上今日子の公務執行妨害罪); "Chapter 9: Kakushidate Yakusuke's Trespassing Crime" (隠館厄介の不法侵入罪); "Chapter 10: Okitegami Kyōko's Partner" (掟上今日子の相棒); "Chapter 11: Kakushidate Yakusuke's Partner" (隠館厄介の相棒); "Chapter 12: Kakushidate Yakusuke's Surrender" (隠館厄介の出頭); "Chapter 13: Okitegami Kyōko's Visualization" (掟上今日子の可視化); "Final Chapter (終章): Okitegami Kyōko's Liberation" (掟上今日子の釈放)
10	Okitegami Kyōko no Iromihon (掟上今日子の色見本)	January 19, 2018	978-4-06-220875-8
"Introduction (序章): The Black Kidnapper" (黒の誘拐犯); "Chapter 1: The Red Telephone Threat" (赤の脅迫電話); "Chapter 2: The Orange Confinement" (橙の監禁); "Chapter 3: The Yellow Problem Set" (黄の問題集); "Chapter 4: The Aqua Manhunt" (水の捜索); "Chapter 5: The Blue Escape Play" (青の脱出劇); "Chapter 6: The Indigo Deal" (藍の取引); "Chapter 7: The Purple Resolution Part" (紫の解決編); "Final Chapter (終章): The White Returning Home" (白の帰宅)
11	Okitegami Kyōko no Jōshaken (掟上今日子の乗車券)	October 5, 2018	978-4-06-513204-3
"Preface" (序文); "Chapter 1: Kyōko-san in Limited Express Bed "Flash of Inspiration" (今日子さんin寝台特急『ひらめき』); "Chapter 2: Mountain Base Auberge "Snow Stop" (山麓オーベルジュ『ゆきどけ』); "Chapter 3: High Speed Boat "Speed Wave" (高速艇『スピードウェーブ』); "Chapter 4: Hydroplane "Water Jet" (水上飛行機『ウォータージェット』); "Chapter 5: Tourist Bus "High-Speed Road" (観光バス『ハイスピードロード』); "Okitegami Kyōko's Staff Notation (Overture)" (控上今日子の五線譜（序曲）)
12	Okitegami Kyōko no Sekkeizu (掟上今日子の設計図)	March 18, 2020	978-4-06-518990-0
No chapters.
13	Okitegami Kyōko no Kansatsuhyō (掟上今日子の鑑札票)	April 22, 2021	978-4-06-522792-3
"Chapter 1: Okitegami Kyōko's Sniper" (掟上今日子の狙撃手); "Chapter 2: Okitegami Kyōko's Minefield" (掟上今日子の地雷原); "Chapter 3: Okitegami Kyōko's Self-propelled Artillery" (掟上今日子の自走砲); "Chapter 4: Okitegami Kyōko's Air-raid Shelter" (掟上今日子の防空壕); "Chapter 5: Okitegami Kyōko's Conscription" (掟上今日子の徴兵制); "Final Chapter: Okitegami Kyōko's End of the War" (掟上今日子の終戦日)
14	Okitegami Kyōko no Ninpōchō (掟上今日子の忍法帖)	June 8, 2022	978-4-06-527703-4
"Chapter 1: Okitegami Kyōko's Shuriken" (掟上今日子の手裏剣); "Chapter 2: Okitegami Kyōko's Ration Pill" (掟上今日子の兵糧丸); "Chapter 3: Okitegami Kyōko's Art of Nonforgetting" (掟上今日子の不忘術)
15	Okitegami Kyōko no Hokenshō (掟上今日子の保険証)	April 16, 2025	978-4-06-539105-1
"Chapter 1: Okitegami Kyōko's Insomnia" (掟上今日子の不眠症); "Chapter 2: Okitegami Kyōko's Wisdom Teeth" (掟上今日子の親知らず); "Chapter 3: Okitegami Kyōko's Seasickness" (掟上今日子の船酔い); "Chapter 4: Okitegami Kyōko's Cat Allergy" (掟上今日子の猫アレルギー); "Okitegami Kyōko's STAY HOLMES" (掟上今日子のSTAY HOLMES)

=== Manga ===
No.	Title	Release date	ISBN
01	Okitegami Kyōko no Bibōroku (1) (掟上今日子の備忘録（1）)	October 16, 2015	978-4-06-377343-9
"Case: Yakusuke Kakushidate 1" (Case：隠館厄介1); "Case: Yakusuke Kakushidate 2" (Case：隠館厄介2); "Extra: Pardon Me, Kyōko-san" (Extra：肘折檻鉄); "Special: Farewell, Kyōko-san" (Special 掟上今日子の置手紙)
02	Okitegami Kyōko no Bibōroku (2) (掟上今日子の備忘録（2）)	April 15, 2016	978-4-06-377446-7
"Case: Yakusuke Kakushidate 3" (Case：隠館厄介3); "Case: Yakusuke Kakushidate 4" (Case：隠館厄介4); "Case: Yakusuke Kakushidate 5" (Case：隠館厄介5); "Case: Yakusuke Kakushidate 6" (Case：隠館厄介6); "Special: 4 Koma - The Acquaintance of Kyōko Okitegami" (Special：4コマ 掟上今日子のご案内)
03	Okitegami Kyōko no Bibōroku (3) (掟上今日子の備忘録（3）)	August 17, 2016	978-4-06-393024-5
"Extra: Inspector Oniniwa" (Extra：鬼庭警部); "Case: Yakusuke Kakushidate 7" (Case：隠館厄介7); "Case: Yakusuke Kakushidate 8" (Case：隠館厄介8); "Case: Yakusuke Kakushidate 9" (Case：隠館厄介9); "Really Stylish! Kyōko-san" (着こなせ！今日子さん)
04	Okitegami Kyōko no Bibōroku (4) (掟上今日子の備忘録（4）)	January 17, 2017	978-4-06-393118-1
"Extra: Mamoru Oyagiri" (Extra：親切守); "Case: Yakusuke Kakushidate 10" (Case：隠館厄介10); "Case: Yakusuke Kakushidate 11" (Case：隠館厄介11); "Case: Yakusuke Kakushidate 12" (Case：隠館厄介12)
05	Okitegami Kyōko no Bibōroku (5) (掟上今日子の備忘録（5）)	April 17, 2017	978-4-06-393180-8
"Extra: Inspector Sawazawa" (Extra：佐和沢警部); "Case: Yakusuke Kakushidate 13" (Case：隠館厄介13); "Case: Yakusuke Kakushidate 14" (Case：隠館厄介14); "Case: Yakusuke Kakushidate 15" (Case：隠館厄介15)

=== TV drama ===
A a Japanese television drama adaptation, titled Okitegami Kyōko no Bibōroku (掟上今日子の備忘録; Kyoko Okitegami's Memo), aired on NTV from October 10 to December 12, 2015, on Saturdays at 21:00. It was directed by Tōya Satō who is known for Gokusen, 14-sai no Haha, and Kaseifu no Mita. Yui Aragaki played the lead role as the private detective, and Masaki Okada played the supporting role. It received the viewership rating of 10.5% on average.

== Reception ==
Okitegami Kyōko no Bibōroku won the Special Award in the 2014 Award of Book☆Walker for being the author's first e-book and for its exceptional sales despite being a single publication. Additionally, it ranked seventh in the site's 2014 e-book rankings and in the Literature category.

The following year, the novel received the 2015 Award of Excellence in Literature at the Book☆Walker Award of 2015. It also ranked 51st overall in the site's 2015 e-book rankings and third in the Literary Arts category.

In 2016, the novel ranked ninth in the Single Books and Novels category at the This Light Novel is Amazing! 2017 awards.

Okitegami Kyōko no Bibōroku sold 21,965 copies during its first five days on the market. Okitegami Kyōko no Suisenbun sold 22,052 copies during its first four days on the market. Okitegami Kyōko no Chōsenjō sold 21,844 copies during its first five days on the market. Okitegami Kyōko no Yuigonsho sold 30,270 copies during its first six days on the market. Okitegami Kyōko no Taishokunegai sold 29,697 copies during its first four days on the market. Okitegami Kyōko no Kon'intodoke sold 24,520 copies during its first six days on the market. Okitegami Kyōko no Kakeibo sold 20,828 copies during its first six days on the market. Okitegami Kyōko no Ryokōki sold 16,704 copies during its first four days on the market. Okitegami Kyōko no Urabyōshi sold 15,691 copies during its first five days on the market. Okitegami Kyōko no Sekkeizu sold 8,735 copies during its first five days on the market. Okitegami Kyōko no Kansatsuhyō sold 7,377 copies during its first four days on the market. Okitegami Kyōko no Ninpōchō sold 5,743 copies during its first five days on the market. Okitegami Kyōko no Hokenshō sold 3,756 copies during its first five days on the market.
