= Okitegami Kyōko no Bibōroku =

- Genre: Drama, Mystery, Romantic Comedy
- Written by: Akiko Nogi
- Directed by: Tōya Satō; Yoshinori Shigeyama; Naoko Komuro
- Starring: Yui Aragaki; Masaki Okada; Daiki Arioka; Rio Uchida
- Opening theme: "Afureru Mono"" by Goodbye Holiday
- Ending theme: "No.1" by Kana Nishino
- Country of origin: Japan
- Original language: Japanese

Production
- Producer: Kyōko Matsumoto
- Running time: 54 minutes
- Production company: AX-ON

Original release
- Network: NTV
- Release: October 10 – December 12, 2015

Okitegami Kyōko no Bibōroku (掟上今日子の備忘録; Kyoko Okitegami's Memo) is a Japanese television drama series based on the detective novel series Bōkyaku Tantei by Nisio Isin. It aired on NTV from October 10 to December 12, 2015 on Saturdays at 21:00. It was directed by Tōya Satō who is known for Gokusen, 14-sai no Haha, and Kaseifu no Mita. Yui Aragaki played the lead role as the private detective, and Masaki Okada played the supporting role. It received the viewership rating of 10.5% on average.

== Cast ==
- Yui Aragaki as Kyouko Okitegami
- Masaki Okada as Yakusuke Kakushidate
- Daiki Arioka as Nuru Narikawa
- Rio Uchida as Makuru Makuma
- Mitsuhiko Oikawa as Horo Kizunai

== Episodes ==
No.	Title	Directed by	Original release date	Rating (%)
1	"僕が恋した白髪の美女探偵…寝たら記憶を無くすので難事件も1日で解決致します"	Tōya Satō	October 10, 2015	12.9%
2	"忘却探偵に恋の罠…水泳選手殺しの犯人は今日子さんの恋人!?"	Tōya Satō	October 17, 2015	10.3%
3	"2億円の名画が破られた!? 忘却探偵が黒髪コスプレで潜入調査"	Yoshinori Shigeyama	October 24, 2015	10.9%
4	"忘却探偵vs天才37人命がけの名推理…気絶させて推理を奪え!"	Yoshinori Shigeyama	October 31, 2015	10.2%
5	"忘却探偵が秋の絶景小旅行…軽井沢でライバル刑事と推理合戦"	Tōya Satō	November 7, 2015	8.8%
6	"名門女子校で美少女が殺人!?セーラー服の忘却探偵に恋の予感"	Naoko Komuro	November 14, 2015	7.6%
7	"私を寝かせないで!忘却探偵が秘密の同棲天国と地獄の5日間"	Tōya Satō	November 21, 2015	9.3%
8	"忘却探偵の正体は!?過去知る謎の男…密室不可能殺人"	Naoko Komuro	November 28, 2015	7.2%
9	"迎えに来たよ…忘却探偵の婚約者が現れた あなたは誰"	Yoshinori Shigeyama	December 5, 2015	9.2%
10	"愛してるから永遠にさよなら…涙の結末忘却探偵の最後の恋"	Tōya Satō	December 12, 2015	10.5%

Preceded by Dokonjō Gaeru (11 July 2015 - 19 September 2015)	NTV Saturday Dramas; Saturdays 21:00 - 21:54 (JST)	Succeeded by Kaitō Yamaneko (16 January 2016 - 19 March 2016)
