= Medaka Box =

Japanese manga series

- First tankōbon volume cover, featuring Medaka Kurokami (left) and Zenkichi Hitoyoshi (right)

めだかボックス (Medaka Bokkusu)
- Genre: Action; Comedy; Supernatural
- Manga
- Written by: Nisio Isin
- Illustrated by: Akira Akatsuki
- Published by: Shueisha
- Imprint: Jump Comics
- Magazine: Weekly Shōnen Jump
- Original run: May 11, 2009 – April 27, 2013
- Volumes: 22
Further information
Anime television series
Directed by	Shouji Saeki
Produced by	Tomoyuki Saitō; Yoshikazu Beniya; Masazumi Katō; Yoshiyuki Itō; Tomoko Saitō
Written by	Shouji Saeki
Music by	Tatsuya Kato
Studio	Gainax
Licensed by	AUS: Hanabee; NA: Sentai Filmworks
Original network	TV Tokyo, TVA, TVO
Original run	April 5, 2012 – December 27, 2012
Episodes	24
Light novel
Shōsetsu-ban Medaka Box
Written by	Nisio Isin
Illustrated by	Akira Akatsuki
Published by	Shueisha
Imprint	Jump J-Books
Original run	May 2, 2012 – June 4, 2012
Volumes	2
Light novel
Medaka Box Gaiden: Good Loser Kumagawa
Written by	Nisio Isin
Illustrated by	Akira Akatsuki
Published by	Shueisha
Imprint	Jump J-Books
Original run	October 10, 2012 – November 12, 2012
Volumes	2
Light novel
Medaka Box: Juvenile – Shousetsu-ban
Written by	Nisio Isin
Illustrated by	Akira Akatsuki
Published by	Shueisha
Imprint	Jump J-Books
Published	October 4, 2013
- icon

Medaka Box (Japanese: めだかボックス, Hepburn: Medaka Bokkusu) is a Japanese manga series written by Nisio Isin and illustrated by Akira Akatsuki. It was serialized in Shueisha's shōnen manga magazine Weekly Shōnen Jump between May 2009 and April 2013, with its chapters collected in 22 tankōbon volumes. The series follows Medaka Kurokami, Zenkichi Hitoyoshi, Kouki Akune and Mogana Kikaijima, who are the members of the student council, during their various adventures to honor suggestions presented by academy members in order to better the academy.

It received three light novel series, two series with two volumes and one with one volume between 2012 and 2013. It was adapted into a 12-episode anime television series that aired between April and June 2012. A second 12-episode season aired between October and December 2012.

== Plot ==
The series follows Medaka Kurokami, a gifted, charismatic and attractive first-year Hakoniwa Academy student who is elected student council president with 98% of the vote. She institutes a suggestion box, and with the help of her childhood friend Zenkichi Hitoyoshi, addresses these requests in an unconventional manner. Over the course of the story, she distributes the student council leadership positions to other students such as Kouki Akune and Mogana Kikaijima.

The Student Council learns that the academy chairman intends to initiate the Flask Plan, a project to forcefully experiment on regular students, called Normals, in order to turn them into humans with superhuman abilities called Abnormals. The Student Council infiltrates the academy's secret lab and battles other students that are involved with the project.

Shortly after, the Student Council are challenged to a tournament by Misogi Kumagawa who wishes to replace Medaka's Student Council with one of his own. After Kumagawa's defeat, two students are unsealed from his powers and complete their transfer to Hakoniwa Academy. The two are more powerful than Abnormals and are dubbed "Not Equals". Their leader, Anshin'in, threatens to restart the Flask Plan once Medaka graduates, forcing the Student Council to train their successors. However, Anshin'in's true plan is to have Zenkichi usurp Medaka's position as Student Council President. Zenkichi does so on the pretense of improving the student life and succeeds. He convinces Medaka to allow the Flask Plan for those who are willing.

Relieved from her duties as president of the Student Council, Medaka soon becomes involved in a tournament to decide her husband. Medaka enters herself and becomes the victor, choosing to marry Zenkichi once they both graduate. Soon after, Zenkichi's close friend Hansode Shiranui leaves the academy. Medaka and Zenkichi discover she is to become the next host for Iihiko Shishime, a 5000-year-old being. Medaka defeats him and disappears after stopping the moon from crashing towards the Earth, just to reappear in time for the year-end ceremony. Following her return, Medaka decides to leave the academy and assume her father's place ahead of her family's business conglomerate, the Kurokami Group, just to later return as the new chairwoman. Ten years later, Zenkichi has worked his way up the Kurokami Group, becoming a high-level employee before reuniting with her, with both promising to get married after another fight.

== Media ==
=== Manga ===
Written by Nisio Isin and illustrated by Akira Akatsuki, Medaka Box was serialized in Shueisha's shōnen manga magazine Weekly Shōnen Jump between May 11, 2009, and April 27, 2013. Shueisha collected its 192 individual chapters in twenty-two tankōbon volumes, released from October 2, 2009, to September 4, 2013.

=== Anime ===
A 12-episode anime television series adaptation, produced by Gainax, was broadcast on TV Tokyo, TV Aichi, and TV Osaka from April 5 to June 21, 2012; a second season, Medaka Box Abnormal (めだかボックス アブノーマル, Medaka Bokkusu Abunōmaru), was broadcast from October 11 to December 27 of that same year.

The anime has been licensed by Sentai Filmworks, who released the anime in both digital and home video formats in September 2013. Sentai Filmworks has also licensed the second season for digital and home video, which was released on January 21, 2014. Both season were streamed by Crunchyroll; after the acquisition of Crunchyroll by Sony Pictures Television, Medaka Box, among several Sentai Filmworks titles, was dropped from the Crunchyroll streaming service on March 31, 2022.

=== Light novels ===
Three light novel works, also written by Nisio Isin and illustrated by Akira Akatsuki, have been released by Shueisha under their Jump J-Books imprint. A two-volume spin-off light novel series, titled Shōsetsu-ban Medaka Box (小説版めだかボックス), was released on May 2 and June 4, 2012. A second two-volume spin-off novel series, titled Medaka Box Gaiden: Good Loser Kumagawa (めだかボックス外伝 グッドルーザー球磨川), was released on October 10 and November 19, 2012. A prequel light novel, titled Medaka Box: Juvenile – Shousetsu-ban (めだかボックス ジュブナイル 小説版), was released on October 4, 2013.

=== Video game ===
Medaka Kurokami appears as a playable character in the Jump crossover fighting game J-Stars Victory VS, with Kumagawa appearing as a support character.

== Reception ==
By 2013, the series had over 5 million copies in circulation.
