= Cipher Academy =

Japanese manga series

- First tankōbon volume cover

暗号学園のいろは (Angō Gakuen no Iroha)
- Genre: Mystery; Thriller
- Manga
- Written by: Nisio Isin
- Illustrated by: Yūji Iwasaki
- Published by: Shueisha
- English publisher: NA: Viz Media
- Imprint: Jump Comics
- Magazine: Weekly Shōnen Jump
- Original run: November 21, 2022 – February 5, 2024
- Volumes: 7
- icon

Cipher Academy (Japanese: 暗号学園のいろは, Hepburn: Angō Gakuen no Iroha) is a Japanese manga series written by Nisio Isin and illustrated by Yūji Iwasaki. It was serialized in Shueisha's shōnen manga magazine Weekly Shōnen Jump from November 2022 to February 2024, with its chapters collected in seven tankōbon volumes.

== Plot ==
The series takes place at the eponymous Cipher Academy, a former all girls' military academy focused on the study of cryptography, telling the story of Iroha Irohazaka, the sole boy in his class. While dealing with a spartan homework puzzle on his first day in class, Iroha comes across Kogoe Horagatoge, a student from a different class on the run from Kyora Toshusai, a fellow student of Iroha's and the heiress to a weapons manufacturer. Iroha helps Kogoe hide, and she gives him a pair of glasses embedded with technology that allows him to see the "hints" to codes. After Kyora bullies Iroha into a cipher-based battle and Iroha uses the glasses to win, he is thrown into a conspiracy involving 50 billion morg hidden at the academy—a stash of cryptocurrency so valuable that it could end half the wars in the world, or, conversely, double them.

== Publication ==
Written by Nisio Isin and illustrated by Yūji Iwasaki, Cipher Academy was serialized in Shueisha's shōnen manga magazine Weekly Shōnen Jump from November 21, 2022, to February 5, 2024. A voice comic featuring Rina Satō, Ayane Sakura, and Saori Ōnishi was released on YouTube. Shueisha released the first tankōbon volume on March 3, 2023, and the seventh and last on May 2, 2024.

Viz Media and Manga Plus published the series in English. In February 2023, the manga's original English translator, Kumar Sivasubramanian, announced he would stop translating the series following the release of the thirteenth chapter; he also linked to an article by Screen Rant, which described Cipher Academy as "impossible to translate". He was replaced by a new translator, Dan Luffey.

=== Volumes ===
| No. | Original release date | Original ISBN | English release date | English ISBN |
|---|---|---|---|---|
| 1 | March 3, 2023 | 978-4-08-883439-9 | February 27, 2024 (digital) | 978-1-9747-4083-3 |
01. "World War IV Will Be Fought with Pencils and Paper" (第四次世界大戦は紙と鉛筆でおこなわれる, Dai Yonji Sekai Taisen wa Kami to Enpitsude Okonawareru); 02. "Can't Solve Puzzles on an Empty Stomach" (腹が減って暗号ができぬ, Hara ga Hette Angō ga Dekinu); 03. "Decoding May Dance, but It Does Not Move Forward" (解読は踊る、されど進まず, Kaidoku wa Odoru, Saredo Susumazu); 04. "Undo the Cipher and Tighten its Cords" (解いて暗号の緒を締めよ, Toite Angō no o o Shimeyo); 05. "Cipher Shipmates" (暗号同舟, Angō Dōshū); 06. "Cipher Soldiers Value Being Rough-and-Ready" (暗号兵は拙速を尊ぶ, Angō-hei wa Sessoku o Tattobu); 07. "The One Who Solves Last Solves Best" (最後に解く者が最もよく解く, Saigo ni Tokumono ga Motto mo Yoku Toku)
| 2 | May 2, 2023 | 978-4-08-883531-0 | May 28, 2024 (digital) | 978-1-9747-4768-9 |
08. "The Dancers are Wars, The Watchers are Wars" (踊る戦争に見る戦争, Odoru Sensō ni Miru Sensō); 09. "A Distant War is Where the Heart Is" (戦争は違くにありて思うもの, Sensō wa Tōkuniarite Omoumono); 10. "Yesterday's War is Today's War Too" (昨日の戦争は今日も戦争, Kinō no Sensō wa Kyō mo Sensō); 11. "You Can't Win Against a War and a Crying Child" (泣く子と暗号には勝てぬ, Nakuko to Angō ni wa Katenu); 12. "Patience is the Source of Eternal Peace; Treat Anger as a Code" ((堪忍は無事長久の基もとい、怒りは暗号と思え, Kan'nin wa Buji Chōkyū no Ki, Ikari wa Angō to Omoe); 13. "To Hide the Solution in a Smile" (笑中に解答あり, Shōchū ni Kaitōari); 14. "Encrypt the Rook Instead of the Useless King" (へぼ将棋王より飛車を暗号化, Hebo Shōgiō yori Hisha o Angōka); 15. "Some Codes Don't Leap, They Limp" (桂の暗号歩の解読, Kei no Angōfu no Kaidoku); 16. "Decoding the King and the Rook at the Same Time" (王手飛車解き, Ōte Hisha Toki)
| 3 | August 4, 2023 | 978-4-08-883594-5 | August 27, 2024 (digital) | 978-1-9747-4863-1 |
17. "Stupid Wars are Basically Just Resets" (下手な戦争むに似たり, Hetana Sensōmu ni Nitari); 18. "A True Soldier Should Know Their Codes" (兵は記号なり, Hei wa Kigōnari); 19. "Decode as Fast as the Wind, Quiet Down Quickly, Launch an Air Raid, then Remain as Unstoppable as a Dragonfly" (疾解きすること風の如く、徐かなること速しの如く、侵掠すること飛の空爆、停まらざると鬼蜻蜒の如し, Hayatokisuru Koto Kaze no Gotoku, Shizu ka Naru Gotoku, Shinryakusuru Koto Hi no Kūbaku, Tomarazaru Koto Oniyanma no Gotoshi); 20. "One Should Never Shy Away from Deception When Decoding on the Battlefield" (戦陣の解には詐偽を厭わず, Senjin no Kai ni wa Sagi o Itowazu); 21. "Thousands Die In Order to Make a Successful Code" (一将暗号なりて万骨枯れる, Isshō Angō Narite Bankotsu Kareru); 22. "Always Approach a Code as if It's Your First" (暗号は常に初陣である, Angō wa Tsune ni Uijindearu); 23. "Too Many Wars Spoil the Battleship-Fund Broth" (戦争多くして軍艦金山に登る, Sensō Ōkushite Gunkan Kinyama ni Noboru); 24. "Triple Code Alliance" (三読同盟, Sandoku Dōmei); 25. "The Road to War Trophies Also Starts With a Single Step" (戦利の道も一歩かる, Senri no Michi mo Ibbokara)
| 4 | October 4, 2023 | 978-4-08-883669-0 | November 26, 2024 (digital) | 978-1-9747-5103-7 |
26. "The Early Bird Gets the Code" (先んずれば暗号を制す, Sakinzureba Angō o Seisu); 27. "Mediocre Strategy is the Source of Codes" (生兵法は暗号の元, Namabyōhō wa Angō no Moto); 28. "Employ the Battlefield and You'll Stand Out. Go With the Flow of the Battlefield and You'll Get Washed Away. Try to Enter Wartime and You'll Be Cramped. In Any Case, Turbulent Times Are Difficult to Live In." (戦地に働けば角が立つ。戦場に棹させば流される。戦時を遠せば窮屈だ。とかくに乱世は住みづらい。, Senchi ni Hatarakeba Kadogatatsu. Senjō ni Saosaseba Nagasareru. Senji o Dōseba Kyūkutsuda. Tokaku ni Ranse wa Sumi Zurai); 29. "If You Know The Enemy and Encrypt Yourself, You Never Lose a Hundred Battles" (敵を知り己を暗号化すれば百戦して危うからず, Teki o Shiri Onore o Angōkasureba Hyakusen Shite Ayaukarazu); 30. "Just Because Military Funds Are High, It Doesn't Mean They're Noble" (軍事費高きがゆえに貴からず, Gunji Hitaka Kigayue ni Tattokarazu); 31. "A War That Happens a Second Time Will Also Happen a Third Time" (二次ある戦争は三次ある, Niji aru Sensō wa Sanji aru); 32. "A Sound Mind is In a Sound War" (健全なる精神は健全なる戦争に宿る, Kenzen'naru Seishin wa Kenzen'naru Sensō ni Yadoru); 33. "Everyone Has Their Own Way of Being a Tank" (戦車三洋, Sensha Sanyō); 34. "One Record That's a Match for a Thousand" (一記当千, Ikki Tōsen)
| 5 | January 4, 2024 | 978-4-08-883795-6 | February 25, 2025 (digital) | 978-1-9747-5375-8 |
35. "When Leaders Tolerate Humiliation, then Even War Can Become Virtuous" (川沢汗を納れ戦争族を蔵す, Sentakuo o Ire Sensōshitsu o Kakusu); 36. "On a Paper Razor's Edge" (剃刀の刃渡り, Kamisori no Hawatari); 37. "Those Who Chase Two Rabbits are First Class Privates" (二兎追う者は一等兵, Nitoou Mono wa Ittōhei); 38. "The Aftermath" (後のまつりごと, Ato no Matsuri Goto); 39. "You Can't Put an Army on a Stone" (石に軍団は着せられず, Ishi ni Gundan wa Kiserarezu); 40. "Whoever Decodes It Should Do It" (まず解より始めよ, Mazu Kaiyori Hajimeyo); 41. "Walk Three Steps Back and Be Careful Not To Step on the Shadows of Those Who Died in War" (三歩下がって戦死の面影を踏まず, Sanposagatte Senshi no Omokage o Fumazu); 42. "War is the Mother of Invention" (戦争は発明の母, Sensō wa Hatsumei no Haha); 43. "It's Better to Have a Big War than a Small War" (大戦争は小戦争を兼ねる, Dai Sensō wa Shō Sensō o Kaneru)
| 6 | March 4, 2024 | 978-4-08-883846-5 | May 27, 2025 (digital) | 978-1-9747-5625-4 |
44. "Mine Has Been a Life of Much War" (戦争の多い生涯を送ってきました, Sensō no Ōi Shōgai o Okutte Kimashita); 45. "Become the Fight, Not the Muzzle" (戦争となるも銃口となるなかれ, Sensō to Naru mo Jūkō to Naru Nakare); 46. "The Desire to Kill Comes from Talking, but That's Better than Talking" (殺し合おうは話し合いより出でて話し合いより青し, Koroshi Aou wa Hanashiai yori Idete Hanashiai yori Aoshi); 47. "Sometimes Even a Kappa Gets Hit by Stray Bullets" (河童の流れ弾, Kappa no Nagaredama); 48. "One Who is Skilled in Both Actions and Destruction" (駆逐八丁手八丁, Kuchiku Hatchōte Hatchō); 49. "One Year's Schemes Begin With Codes" (一年の計略は暗号にあり, Ichinen no Keiryaku wa Angō ni ari); 50. "Tight Lipped When Questioned, Capable of Destroying Castles When Speaking Freely" (問うに落ちず語るに落城, Tou ni Ochizu Kataru ni Rakujō); 51. "It's Best to Decode and Run Away from Troublesome Things" (三十六計逃げるに解けず, Sanjūrokkei Nigeru ni Tokezu); 52. "The Betrayal of a Betrayal Gets All The Blame" (裏切りの裏切りは矢面, Uragiri no Uragiri wa Yaomote)
| 7 | May 2, 2024 | 978-4-08-884021-5 | August 26, 2025 (digital) | 978-1-9747-5770-1 |
53. "And Yet The Earth Still Revolves (Around War)" (それでも地球は(戦争で)回っている, Soredemo Chikyū wa (Sensō de) Mawatteiru); 54. "A Nearby Delegation is More Reliable than a Distant War Result" (遠くの戦績より近くの委任, Tōku no Sensekiyori Chikaku no Inin); 55. "Hornets Keep Dancing Until They're 100" (雀蜂百まで踊りを忘れず, Hōnetto Hyakumade Odori o Wasurezu); 56. "Curse a War, and You Must Dig Two Graves" (戦争を呪わば穴ふたつ, Sensō o Norowaba Ana Futatsu); 57. "The Word "Code" Doesn't Exist in the Emperor's Dictionary" (皇帝の辞書に暗号はない, Kōtei no Jisho ni Angō wanai); 58. "As Long as It Ends Well, It's All Good" (終戦よければすべて読了, Shūsen Yokereba Subete Dokuryō); Secret Mission. "Aloha" (アロハ, Aroha)

== Reception ==
The series ranked fourth in the 2023 Next Manga Award in the print manga category. The series ranked tenth in the Nationwide Bookstore Employees' Recommended Comics of 2024 list.

Carlyle Edmundson of Screen Rant praised the use of purposeful censorship to illustrate points about contemporary Japan.
