= Akira Akatsuki =

Japanese manga artist

Akira Akatsuki 暁月 あきら
- Born: August 18, 1977 (age 49)
- Area: Manga artist
- Notable works: Medaka Box
- Collaborators: Nisio Isin

Akira Akatsuki (暁月 あきら, Akatsuki Akira; born August 18, 1977) is a Japanese manga artist. His most notable work was as the illustrator for Nisio Isin's manga series Medaka Box, which ran in Weekly Shōnen Jump from 2009 to 2013. Another one of his works, Luger Code 1951, was adapted into a net anime by Studio Deen in 2016.

== Works ==
- Z-XL Dai (Z-XLダイ) – Akamaru Jump, 2003
- Angel Agent – Jump the Revolution!, 2005
- Contractor M&Y (ja:神力契約者M&Y; also Controller M&Y) – Weekly Shōnen Jump, 2006–07, one-shot and series
- Little Brave Pukateriosu (LITTLE BRAVE プカテリオス) – Akamaru Jump, 2008
- Medaka Box (めだかボックス) – Weekly Shōnen Jump, 2009–13, one-shot and 22 volume series, with Nisio Isin – Illustrator
- Good Loser Kumagawa – Weekly Shōnen Jump, 2011, one-shot, with Isio Nisin – spin-off of Medaka Box
- Toshokan Kyūseishu Kurabu (図書館救世主倶楽部; Library Savior Club) – Jump Next!, 2013
- Musume Iri-Bako (Girl in a Box) – Weekly Shonen Jump, 2014, one shot, with Nisio Isin
