= Nisio Isin =

Japanese novelist

- Born: 1981 (age 44–45); Japan
- Occupation: Writer
- Writing career
- Period: 2002–present
- Notable works: Zaregoto; Monogatari; Katanagatari; Medaka Box; Juni Taisen: Zodiac War; Pretty Boy Detective Club
- Notable awards: Mephisto Prize (2002)
- Website: Official website

Nisio Isin (Japanese: 西尾 維新, Hepburn: Nishio Ishin; born 1981), often stylized as NISIOISIN to emphasize the palindrome, is a pseudonymous Japanese novelist, manga author, and screenplay writer.

Nisio debuted in 2002 with the novel The Beheading Cycle (the first in his Zaregoto series), which earned him the 23rd Mephisto Prize at twenty years of age. In 2005, he began his long-running Monogatari novel series, which was published in 31 volumes as of 2026, and was later adapted as a highly-successful animated series of the same name, produced by Shaft. His Katanagatari novels, Medaka Box manga series, Jūni Taisen novel, and The Beheading Cycle have also been adapted as anime. He has also collaborated with Death Note writer Tsugumi Ohba and illustrator Takeshi Obata to write the light novel Death Note Another Note: The Los Angeles BB Murder Cases. Between 2009 and 2016, he ranked among the top 10 best-selling authors in Japan, ranking as the best-selling in 2012 and 2014. As of November 2022, his novels and manga had over 36 million copies in circulation.

Nisio's works frequently feature lengthy and witty dialogues. He is viewed as an author that blends regular novels and light novels, going through the genres of mystery, sekaikei, and shindenki, with frequent references to other manga and anime.

== Career ==
Nisio Isin was a manga enthusiast since childhood and wanted to become a mangaka. However, seeing a lack of improvement in his drawing ability, he decided to become a novelist, mentioning that it didn't matter if his handwriting was subpar. He attended the Ritsumeikan University College of Policy Science and left the university without graduating.

During his early career when he submitted work for magazines, Nisio's writing speed was a selling point, and he once submitted two or three works to a single Mephisto Prize. In 2002, Nisio debuted with the first novel of the Zaregoto series, Kubikiri Cycle: The Blue Savant and the Nonsense User, earning him the 23rd Mephisto Prize. He was twenty years of age at the time, and his slogan was "Nisio Isin, the 20-year-old from Kyoto". Afterward, he proceeded to write the second title in the series, Strangulation Romanticist, in three days.

He has worked with Kodansha on the literary magazines Mephisto, Faust, and Pandora. He also published his Katanagatari series as twelve volumes over twelve months for the Kodansha Box line in 2007; Ryūsui Seiryōin was matching this output, and the Kodansha Box website stated that it was the first time in the world two authors had done twelve-volume monthly novel series simultaneously.

Nisio Isin is best known for the Monogatari series, which began as a trilogy of short stories on the Mephisto magazine in 2005, and developed into a series with 30 volumes. It has been adapted as anime up to Shinobumonogatari, still has ongoing anime adaptations for the series, and it has also been adapted as manga. The series has consistently achieved a high number of sales, with the anime's first two seasons alone, Bakemonogatari and Nisemonogatari, selling over one million DVDs and Blu-rays combined as of September 2012.

The first volume of Zaregoto, his Katanagatari and Medaka Box series, his Jūni Taisen novel, and the Pretty Boy Detective Club series have all been adapted into anime as well. Juni Taisen was also adapted as a Stage Play in Japan in 2018. His Bōkyaku Tantei series was adapted as a Japanese Drama in 2015. Several of his series have been adapted as manga.

In February 2008, his novel Death Note Another Note: The Los Angeles BB Murder Cases, based on the Death Note manga, was released in English by Viz Media. Del Rey Manga released the first and second volume in his Zaregoto series, which were revised for a rerelease by Vertical and followed by a translation of the third volume. Vertical is translating other titles and series by Nisio Isin, including Monogatari, Katanagatari, Pretty Boy Detective Club, and Imperfect Girl.

From 2009 to 2016, Nisio Isin was one of the top 10 best-selling authors in Japan, achieving a place in the top 3 for three years and, in 2012 and 2014, ranking first place as the best-selling author in the country. In those years, he sold 1,408,319 copies and 997,211 copies, respectively. As of November 2022, his novels and manga had over 36 million copies in circulation. The Publishers Weekly's Translation Database reported that from 2008 to 2018, 19 of Nisio's novels were translated into English, putting him as the second author with the most English translations of that period in the U.S. (Note: The Publishers Weekly's Translation Database does not track light novel's translations.)

== Style ==
Since Nisio's debut, wordplay and tongue-in-cheek dialogue have been characteristic of his works. When asked if his use of manzai comedy was related to the fact he is from the Kansai region, he replied "I think it's certainly because I'm a Kansai person." He feels that "dialogue is the character" and focuses more on dialogue than appearance. Nisio features many women in his works because "it is easier for them to express their individuality" explaining that "women are much more adorned as characters (e.g. fashion) than men".

His greatest influence comes from such things as Shōnen Jump manga and shōjo manga en masse. About manga, he is a passionate fan of JoJo's Bizarre Adventure; in a dialogue with Hirohiko Araki, the author of the manga, he commented this is "a manga he would like all humanity to read." Among his references, references to JoJo are particularly common and in a novelization project of the series called "VS JOJO", together with Kouhei Kadono and Ōtarō Maijō, he wrote one of the novels that were published, called JoJo's Bizarre Adventure Over Heaven.

His works are characterized by a sense of literature that is amid the so-called "Shindenki" (ja) mystery-light novel genre, in which insane characters attempt to solve a mystery in a situation that would be impossible or unlikely in reality; and inexhaustible quotations of anime and manga from the past. He is well regarded as an author who has blended the conventions of mystery novels and character-driven light novels. Tsunehiro Uno describes Nisio Isin as the only writer who has made a smooth transition from "Sekaikei" (ja) to "Shindenki".

He has made no secret of his policy of not doing crossover or linking in his Zaregoto series. This is because crossover and linking was a technique Kouhei Kadono, whom he admires, excelled at, and so he decided to stick with the opposite style, but he replied he made an exception for the Ningen series because he began writing it as an homage to the relationship between the Kouhei Kadono's Boogiepop series and Beat's Discipline. He still maintains a steady writing pace and develops several series at the same time, but until Mazemonogatari, he did not link his works to each other. After fifteen years of non-crossover writing, he decided it was time to try a new pattern.

He has a unique way of naming his characters. He seeks to define his characters by their names, and he does not simply give them unusual names, but instead establishes some rules for them, although he will occasionally deviate from these rules. When it comes to naming, he has been described as "bizarre" and "extremely strange". Examples are Namanie Nienami, Kiki Kikitsu, Shibuki Shibushi, Mukae Emukae, Momo Momozono, Kajiki Kurokami, Kariteru Kanaino, Sukinasaki Saki, Shikigishi Kishiki, Kiss-shot Acerola-orion Heart-under-blade, Backyard Bottomslash, Quarter Queen, Sagano Usagi, Byōinzaka Kuroneko (which translates roughly as "Black Cat of Hospital Hill") and Shikizaki Kiki.

He said he learned much from the novels of Kiyoshi Kasai (the author of Vampire Wars), Hiroshi Mori, Natsuhiko Kyogoku, Ryūsui Seiryōin and Kouhei Kadono. He has also stated the five writers were, metaphorically speaking, God-like beings, who had shaped and molded his writing style.

== Nisio and light novels ==
Most of Nisio's works are published by Kodansha Novels, a general literature imprint, but are sometimes classified as light novels. In a conversation with Tow Ubukata, Otsuichi said of Nisio, "I think he falls into the light novel category in a broad sense." The January 2005 issue of Nikkei Characters! introduces Nisio as "a new generation of writers who are breaking down the barriers between general literature and light novels." The Nisio Isin Chronicle describes his Zaregoto series as "often regarded as a light novel". Kiyoshi Kasai talking about light novels in the 2004 special edition of Eureka, commented that, although having the Zaregoto series ranked in a guide for light novels could be out of place, the influences Nisio had in his writing are easy to see, such as Kimi to Boku no Kowareta Sekai's academy romance, fighting pretty girls, moe characters, and Sekaikei-like settings, so it is not strange to see his works through the lenses of light novels.

In the 2004 edition of the light novel guide book This Light Novel is Amazing! 2005, the Zaregoto series ranked as the second most popular light novel series, but the authors wrote: "There are different opinions on whether the Zaregoto series is a light novel or not." Taking into account various opinions on "bunko is the light novel", "packaging", "age of the characters", and other factors, the book's Genre Guide refers to the Zaregoto series and Kimi to Boku no Kowareta Sekai as "borders" outside of the bunko. In the following year's This Light Novel Is Amazing! 2006, the Zaregoto series ranked first, and in an interview held to commemorate this, Nisio said, "I'm unsure if it's a light novel" commenting that "it's not a light novel in the sense that it's 'not a light novel label,' but it's part of a light novel in the sense that 'it's a collaboration between an illustration and a novel,'" and he also said that he has no qualms about his work being identified as a light novel.

== Works in English translation ==
=== Novels ===
Zaregoto series

- Zaregoto, Book 1: DECAPITATION: Kubikiri Cycle - The Blue Savant and the Nonsense User (Del Rey. 2008. ISBN 978-0-345-50427-2, Vertical. 2017. ISBN 978-1-945054-21-1) – the winning work of the 23rd Mephisto Prize (2002)
- Zaregoto, Book 2: STRANGULATION: Kubishime Romanticist - No Longer Human - Hitoshiki Zerozaki (Del Rey. 2010. ISBN 978-0-345-50578-1, Vertical. 2018. ISBN 978-1-945054-83-9)
- Zaregoto, Book 3: SUSPENSION: Kubitsuri High School - the Nonsense User's Disciple (Vertical. 2019. ISBN 978-1-947194-89-2)

Monogatari series

- KIZUMONOGATARI: Wound Tale (Vertical. 2015. ISBN 978-1-941220-97-9)
- BAKEMONOGATARI, Part 1: Monster Tale (Vertical. 2016. ISBN 978-1-942993-88-9)
- BAKEMONOGATARI, Part 2: Monster Tale (Vertical. 2017. ISBN 978-1-942993-89-6)
- BAKEMONOGATARI, Part 3: Monster Tale (Vertical. 2017. ISBN 978-1-942993-90-2)
- NISEMONOGATARI, Part 1: Fake Tale (Vertical. 2017. ISBN 978-1-942993-98-8)
- NISEMONOGATARI, Part 2: Fake Tale (Vertical. 2017. ISBN 978-1-942993-99-5)
- NEKOMONOGATARI (BLACK): Cat Tale (Vertical. 2017. ISBN 978-1-945054-48-8)
- NEKOMONOGATARI (WHITE): Cat Tale (Vertical. 2018. ISBN 978-1-945054-49-5)
- KABUKIMONOGATARI: Dandy Tale (Vertical. 2018. ISBN 978-1-945054-84-6)
- HANAMONOGATARI: Flower Tale (Vertical. 2018. ISBN 978-1-947194-06-9)
- OTORIMONOGATARI: Decoy Tale (Vertical. 2018. ISBN 978-1-947194-14-4)
- ONIMONOGATARI: Demon Tale (Vertical. 2018. ISBN 978-1-947194-31-1)
- KOIMONOGATARI: Love Tale (Vertical. 2019. ISBN 978-1-947194-33-5)
- TSUKIMONOGATARI: Possession Tale (Vertical. 2019. ISBN 978-1-947194-47-2)
- KOYOMIMONOGATARI, Part 1: Calendar Tale (Vertical. 2019. ISBN 978-1-947194-48-9)
- KOYOMIMONOGATARI, Part 2: Calendar Tale (Vertical. 2019. ISBN 978-1-947194-69-4)
- OWARIMONOGATARI, Part 1: End Tale (Vertical. 2019. ISBN 978-1-947194-90-8)
- OWARIMONOGATARI, Part 2: End Tale (Vertical. 2020. ISBN 978-1-947194-92-2)
- OWARIMONOGATARI, Part 3: End Tale (Vertical. 2020. ISBN 978-1-949980-22-6)
- ZOKU OWARIMONOGATARI: End Tale (Cont.) (Vertical. 2020. ISBN 978-1-949980-44-8)

Katanagatari series

Omnibus 3-in-1 volumes.

- KATANAGATARI, 1: Sword Tale (Vertical. 2018. ISBN 978-1-947194-32-8)
- KATANAGATARI, 2: Sword Tale (Vertical. 2019. ISBN 978-1-947194-56-4)
- KATANAGATARI, 3: Sword Tale (Vertical. 2019. ISBN 978-1-947194-91-5)
- KATANAGATARI, 4: Sword Tale (Vertical. 2020. ISBN 978-1-949980-23-3)

Pretty Boy series

- Bishōnen, Book 1: Pretty Boy Detective Club: The Dark Star that Shines for You Alone (Vertical. 2020. ISBN 978-1-949980-87-5)
- Bishōnen, Book 2: The Swindler, the Vanishing Man, and the Pretty Boys (Vertical. 2020. ISBN 978-1-949980-87-5)
- Bishōnen, Book 3: The Pretty Boy in the Attic (Vertical. 2021. ISBN 978-1-949980-88-2)

Other books

- Death Note Another Note: The Los Angeles BB Murder Cases (Viz Media. 2008. ISBN 978-1-4215-1883-1)
- xxxHOLiC: AnotherHOLiC (Del Rey. 2008. ISBN 978-0-345-50518-7)
- Juni Taisen: Zodiac War (Viz Media. 2017. ISBN 978-1-4215-9750-8)

Short stories

- Magical Girl Risuka (Faust 2. Del Rey. 2009. ISBN 978-0-345-50357-2)
  - This is the English translation of "Yasashii Mahō wa Tsukaenai" (lit. "Easy magic cannot be used"), the first story of Risuka series.
- Kyōko Okitegami in STAY HOLMES - Bōkyaku Tantei series.
  - A short story published on May 2, 2020, in a project titled Day to Day on the website tree.
- Street For You
  - A short story published on August 28, 2020, in a project titled Story for you on the website tree.

=== Manga ===
One-shot

- After School: 7th Class (Faust 1. Del Rey. 2008. ISBN 978-0-345-50206-3)

Imperfect Girl

Adaptation of the Shōjo Fujūbun novel.

- Imperfect Girl, 1 (Vertical Comics. 2017. ISBN 978-1-945054-60-0)
- Imperfect Girl, 2 (Vertical Comics. 2018. ISBN 978-1-945054-61-7)
- Imperfect Girl, 3 (Vertical Comics. 2018. ISBN 978-1-945054-62-4)

Juni Taisen: Zodiac War

Adaptation of the Jūni Taisen novel.

- Juni Taisen: Zodiac War (manga), Vol. 1 (VIZ Media LLC. 2018. ISBN 978-1-9747-0250-3)
- Juni Taisen: Zodiac War (manga), Vol. 2 (VIZ Media LLC. 2018. ISBN 978-1-9747-0249-7)
- Juni Taisen: Zodiac War (manga), Vol. 3 (VIZ Media LLC. 2019. ISBN 978-1-9747-0251-0)
- Juni Taisen: Zodiac War (manga), Vol. 4 (VIZ Media LLC. 2019. ISBN 978-1-9747-0563-4)

Bakemonogatari

Adaptation of the Monogatari series novels.

- BAKEMONOGATARI (manga), volume 1 (Vertical Comics. 2019. ISBN 978-1-947194-97-7)
- BAKEMONOGATARI (manga), volume 2 (Vertical Comics. 2020. ISBN 978-1-949980-02-8)
- BAKEMONOGATARI (manga), volume 3 (Vertical Comics. 2020. ISBN 978-1-949980-16-5)
- BAKEMONOGATARI (manga), volume 4 (Vertical Comics. 2020. ISBN 978-1-949980-40-0)
- BAKEMONOGATARI (manga), volume 5 (Vertical Comics. 2020. ISBN 978-1-949980-50-9)
- BAKEMONOGATARI (manga), volume 6 (Vertical Comics. 2020. ISBN 978-1-949980-68-4)
- BAKEMONOGATARI (manga), volume 7 (Vertical Comics. 2021. ISBN 978-1-949980-69-1)
- BAKEMONOGATARI (manga), volume 8 (Vertical Comics. 2021. ISBN 978-1-949980-70-7)
- BAKEMONOGATARI (manga), volume 9 (Vertical Comics. 2021. ISBN 978-1-949980-99-8)
- BAKEMONOGATARI (manga), volume 10 (Vertical Comics. 2021. ISBN 978-1-64729-007-8)
- BAKEMONOGATARI (manga), volume 11 (Vertical Comics. 2021. ISBN 978-1-64729-064-1)
- BAKEMONOGATARI (manga), volume 12 (Vertical Comics. 2022. ISBN 978-1-64729-065-8)
- BAKEMONOGATARI (manga), volume 13 (Vertical Comics. 2022. ISBN 978-1-64729-087-0)
- BAKEMONOGATARI (manga), volume 14 (Vertical Comics. 2022. ISBN 978-1-64729-088-7)
- BAKEMONOGATARI (manga), volume 15 (Vertical Comics. 2022. ISBN 978-1-64729-089-4)
- BAKEMONOGATARI (manga), volume 16 (Vertical Comics. 2022. ISBN 978-1-64729-154-9)
- BAKEMONOGATARI (manga), volume 17 (Vertical Comics. 2023. ISBN 978-1-64729-196-9)
- BAKEMONOGATARI (manga), volume 18 (Vertical Comics. 2023. ISBN 978-1-64729-218-8)
- BAKEMONOGATARI (manga), volume 19 (Vertical Comics. 2023. ISBN 978-1-64729-219-5)
- BAKEMONOGATARI (manga), volume 20 (Vertical Comics. 2023. ISBN 978-1-64729-220-1)
- BAKEMONOGATARI (manga), volume 21 (Vertical Comics. 2024. ISBN 978-1-64729-297-3)
- BAKEMONOGATARI (manga), volume 22 (Vertical Comics. 2024. ISBN 978-1-64729-298-0)

Pretty Boy Detective Club

Adaptation of the novels with the same name.

- Pretty Boy Detective Club (manga), volume 1 (Vertical Comics. 2021. ISBN 978-1-64729-047-4)
- Pretty Boy Detective Club (manga), volume 2 (Vertical Comics. 2021. ISBN 978-1-64729-076-4)

Cipher Academy

- Cipher Academy, Vol. 1 (Shonen Jump. 2024. ISBN 978-1-9747-4083-3)
- Cipher Academy, Vol. 2 (Shonen Jump. 2024. ISBN 978-1-9747-4768-9)
- Cipher Academy, Vol. 3 (Shonen Jump. 2024. ISBN 978-1-9747-4863-1)
- Cipher Academy, Vol. 4 (Shonen Jump. 2024. ISBN 978-1-9747-5103-7)
- Cipher Academy, Vol. 5 (Shonen Jump. 2025. ISBN 978-1-9747-5375-8)
- Cipher Academy, Vol. 6 (Shonen Jump. 2025. ISBN 978-1-9747-5625-4)
- Cipher Academy, Vol. 7 (Shonen Jump. 2025. ISBN 978-1-9747-5770-1)

== Novels ==
=== Zaregoto series ===
The Zaregoto series (戯言シリーズ, Zaregoto Shirīzu) is written by Nisio Isin and illustrated by Take. Nine volumes were published between February 2002 and November 2005. The tenth volume was published on February 8, 2023. It was followed by a spin-off series titled Ningen series starring the Zerozaki clan. A second spin-off series titled Saikyō series focusing on the character Jun Aikawa was also released. All books were released in Japan by Kodansha Novels.

First published	Title	ISBN
February 7, 2002	The Beheading Cycle: The Blue Savant and the Nonsense Bearer (クビキリサイクル 青色サヴァンと戯言遣い, Kubikiri Saikuru: Aoiro Savan to Zaregoto Tsukai)	978-4-06-182233-7
May 8, 2002	Strangulation Romanticist: Hitoshiki Zerozaki, Human Failure (クビシメロマンチスト―人間失格・零崎人識, Kubishime Romanchisutō: Ningen Shikkaku, Zerozaki Hitoshiki)	978-4-06-182250-4
August 6, 2002	Hanging High School: The Nonsense Bearer's Pupil (クビツリハイスクール―戯言遣いの弟子, Kubitsuri Hai Sukūrū: Zaregoto Tsukai no Deshi)	978-4-06-182267-2
November 7, 2002	Psycho Logical (Part One) Gaisuke Utsurigi's Nonsense Killer (サイコロジカル〈上〉兎吊木垓輔の戯言殺し, Saiko Rojikaru (Jō) Utsurigi Gaisuke no Zaregoto Koroshi)	978-4-06-182283-2
November 7, 2002	Psycho Logical (Part Two): Sour Little Song (サイコロジカル〈下〉曳かれ者の小唄, Saiko Rojikaru (Ge) Hikaremono no Kōta)	978-4-06-182284-9
July 5, 2003	Cannibal Magical: Niounomiya Siblings, Masters of Carnage (ヒトクイマジカル-殺戮奇術の匂宮兄妹, Hitokui Majikarū Satsuriku Kijutsu no Niōnomiya Kyōdai)	978-4-06-182323-5
February 8, 2005	Uprooted Radical (Part One): The Thirteen Stairs (ネコソギラジカル〈上〉十三階段, Nekosogi Rajikaru (Jō) Jūsan Kaidan)	978-4-06-182393-8
June 7, 2005	Uprooted Radical (Part Two): Overkill Red vs. The Orange Seed (ネコソギラジカル〈中〉赤き征裁vs.橙なる種, Nekosogi Rajikaru (Chū) Akaki Seisai vs. Tōnaru Shu)	978-4-06-182399-0
November 8, 2005	Uprooted Radical (Part Three): The Blue Savant and the Nonsense Bearer (ネコソギラジカル〈下〉青色サヴァンと戯言遣い, Nekosogi Rajikaru (Ge) Aoiro Savan to Zaregoto Tsukai)	978-4-06-182400-3
February 8, 2023	Kidnap Kidding: The Blue Savant and the Daughter of the Nonsense Bearer (キドナプキディング 青色サヴァンと戯言遣いの娘, Kidonapu Kidingu: Aoiro Savant to Zaregotozukai no Musume)	978-4-06-530234-7

- Zaregoto Dictional - Dictionary for the Zaregoto series (ザレゴトディクショナル 戯言シリーズ用語辞典) (June 7, 2006. Kodansha. ISBN 978-4-06-182489-8)
  - A dictionary of the Zaregoto series telling the behind-the-scenes of the story. The 4-koma manga drawn by Take titled Zaregoto Ichiban (戯言一番) was re-released in the book.

==== Ningen series ====
Spin-off of the Zaregoto series, it is also known as the Zerozaki Ichizoku series. The illustrations are provided by Take. Published by Kodansha.

First published	Title	ISBN
February 6, 2004	Sōshiki Zerozaki's Human Experiment (零崎双識の人間試験, Zerozaki Sōshiki no Ningen Shiken)	978-4-06-182359-4
November 8, 2006	Kishishiki Zerozaki's Human Knock (零崎軋識の人間ノック, Zerozaki Kishishiki no Ningen Knock)	978-4-06-182509-3
March 7, 2008	Magashiki Zerozaki's Human Character (零崎曲識の人間人間, Zerozaki Magashiki no Ningen Ningen)	978-4-06-182582-6
March 25, 2010	Hitoshiki Zerozaki's Human Relations: Relations with Izumu Niōnomiya (零崎人識の人間関係 匂宮出夢との関係, Zerozaki Hitoshiki no Ningen Kankei: Niōnomiya Izumu to no Kankei)	978-4-06-182679-3
March 25, 2010	Hitoshiki Zerozaki's Human Relations: Relations with Iori Mutō (零崎人識の人間関係 無桐伊織との関係, Zerozaki Hitoshiki no Ningen Kankei: Mutō Iori to no Kankei)	978-4-06-182680-9
March 25, 2010	Hitoshiki Zerozaki's Human Relations: Relations with Sōshiki Zerozaki (零崎人識の人間関係 零崎双識との関係, Zerozaki Hitoshiki no Ningen Kankei: Zerozaki Sōshiki to no Kankei)	978-4-06-182681-6
March 25, 2010	Hitoshiki Zerozaki's Human Relations: Relations with the Nonsense Bearer (零崎人識の人間関係 戯言遣いとの関係, Zerozaki Hitoshiki no Ningen Kankei: Zaregoto Tsukai to no Kankei)	978-4-06-182682-3

==== Saikyō series ====
Spin-off of the Zaregoto series telling the story of "Overkill Red" Jun Aikawa. It was first serialized in the Mephisto magazine. Published by Kodansha. Take handled the illustrations for the series again.

First published	Title	ISBN
April 23, 2015	Jinrui Saikyō no Hatsukoi (人類最強の初恋)	978-4-06-299040-0
May 7, 2016	Jinrui Saikyō no Jun'ai (人類最強の純愛)	978-4-06-299074-5
April 20, 2017	Jinrui Saikyō no Tokimeki (人類最強のときめき)	978-4-06-299093-6
May 11, 2020	Jinrui Saikyō no Sweetheart (人類最強のsweetheart)	978-4-06-519765-3
November 11, 2020	Jinrui Saikyō no Venechia (人類最強のヴェネチア)	978-4-06-521559-3

=== JDC Tribute series ===
The Japan Detectives Club was created by Ryūsui Seiryōin, and Nisio Isin is one of several authors to write novels using that setting. The third book is a compilation of the first two.

First published	Title	ISBN
March 6, 2003	Double Down Kanguro (ダブルダウン勘繰郎)	978-4-06-182305-1
August 7, 2007	Triple Play Sukeakuro (トリプルプレイ助悪郎)	978-4-06-182538-3
January 15, 2010	Double Down Kanguro/Triple Play Sukeakuro (ダブルダウン勘繰郎/トリプルプレイ助悪郎)	978-4-06-276491-9

=== Sekai series ===
Interlinked mystery series with a different narrator telling the story each time. Published by Kodansha. Illustrated by Tagro.

First published	Title	ISBN
November 8, 2003	Kimi to Boku no Kowareta Sekai (きみとぼくの壊れた世界)	978-4-06-182342-6
October 10, 2007	Bukimi de Soboku na Kakowareta Sekai (不気味で素朴な囲われた世界)	978-4-06-182557-4
July 8, 2008	Kimi to Boku ga Kowashita Sekai (きみとぼくが壊した世界)	978-4-06-182600-7
December 5, 2008	Bukimi de Soboku na Kakowareta Kimi to Boku no Kowareta Sekai (不気味で素朴な囲われたきみとぼくの壊れた世界)	978-4-06-182626-7

- With the publication of the second novel, both books were also published in hard cover through Kodansha Box.

=== Risuka series ===
First serialized in Faust magazine with illustrations by Capcom's Kinu Nishimura. It was later published by Kodansha.

First published	Title	ISBN
July 17, 2004	Shin Honkaku Mahō Shōjo Risuka (新本格魔法少女りすか)	978-4-06-182381-5
March 16, 2005	Shin Honkaku Mahō Shōjo Risuka 2 (新本格魔法少女りすか2)	978-4-06-182432-4
March 23, 2007	Shin Honkaku Mahō Shōjo Risuka 3 (新本格魔法少女りすか3)	978-4-06-182521-5
December 9, 2020	Shin Honkaku Mahō Shōjo Risuka 4 (新本格魔法少女りすか4)	978-4-06-521560-9

=== Monogatari series ===
The series was first created by Nisio Isin as a series of short stories for the Mephisto magazine. While his previous series, Zaregoto, featured large casts of characters, each Bakemonogatari story tends to introduce only one new character. The previously published stories, and some new ones, were eventually collected in two volumes as part of the Kodansha Box launch titles on November 2, 2006, and December 5, 2006, and it continued its 28-volumes publication until August 19, 2021. On January 25, 2023, Nisio Isin announced a new novel that was published on May 17, 2023, continuing the series. Vofan handled the illustrations for the series. The series is divided into six parts: First Season, Second Season, Final Season, Off Season, Monster Season and Family Season.

First published	Title	ISBN
Monogatari series: First Season
November 2, 2006	Bakemonogatari (Jō) (化物語（上）)	978-4-06-283602-9
December 5, 2006	Bakemonogatari (Ge) (化物語（下）)	978-4-06-283607-4
May 8, 2008	Kizumonogatari (傷物語)	978-4-06-283663-0
September 2, 2008	Nisemonogatari (Jō) (偽物語（上）)	978-4-06-283679-1
June 11, 2009	Nisemonogatari (Ge) (偽物語（下）)	978-4-06-283702-6
July 29, 2010	Nekomonogatari (Kuro) (猫物語（黒）)	978-4-06-283748-4
Monogatari series: Second Season
October 28, 2010	Nekomonogatari (Shiro) (猫物語（白）)	978-4-06-283758-3
December 25, 2010	Kabukimonogatari (傾物語)	978-4-06-283767-5
March 30, 2011	Hanamonogatari (花物語)	978-4-06-283771-2
June 29, 2011	Otorimonogatari (囮物語)	978-4-06-283776-7
September 29, 2011	Onimonogatari (鬼物語)	978-4-06-283781-1
December 21, 2011	Koimonogatari (恋物語)	978-4-06-283792-7
Monogatari series: Final Season
September 27, 2012	Tsukimonogatari (憑物語)	978-4-06-283812-2
May 21, 2013	Koyomimonogatari (暦物語)	978-4-06-283837-5
October 22, 2013	Owarimonogatari (Jō) (終物語（上）)	978-4-06-283857-3
January 30, 2014	Owarimonogatari (Chū) (終物語（中）)	978-4-06-283861-0
April 2, 2014	Owarimonogatari (Ge) (終物語（下）)	978-4-06-283868-9
September 18, 2014	Zoku Owarimonogatari (続・終物語)	978-4-06-283878-8
Monogatari series: Off Season
October 6, 2015	Orokamonogatari (愚物語)	978-4-06-283889-4
January 14, 2016	Wazamonogatari (業物語)	978-4-06-283892-4
July 28, 2016	Nademonogatari (撫物語)	978-4-06-283898-6
January 12, 2017	Musubimonogatari (結物語)	978-4-06-283900-6
Monogatari series: Monster Season
July 20, 2017	Shinobumonogatari (忍物語)	978-4-06-283902-0
June 14, 2018	Yoimonogatari (宵物語)	978-4-06-511992-1
April 17, 2019	Amarimonogatari (余物語)	978-4-06-515225-6
October 28, 2020	Ōgimonogatari (扇物語)	978-4-06-521158-8
August 19, 2021	Shinomonogatari (Jō) (死物語（上）)	978-4-06-524454-8
August 19, 2021	Shinomonogatari (Ge) (死物語（下）)	978-4-06-524455-5
Monogatari series: Family Season
May 17, 2023	Ikusamonogatari (戦物語)	978-4-06-531262-9
October 16, 2025	Tsugimonogatari (接物語)	978-4-06-541079-0
September 3, 2026	Torimonogatari (鳥物語)	978-4-06-543739-1

==== Mazemonogatari ====
In Mazemonogatari (混物語, Mix Story) Koyomi Araragi meets various heroines from other series written by Nisio Isin. These crossover stories were first distributed in sessions for the Kizumonogatari movies between 2016 and 2017. Kodansha collected those stories, with 3 new ones, and published in 2019. ISBN 978-4-06-513292-0

==== Mijikanamonogatari ====
In 2024, Kodansha collected 33 previously published short stories and 6 new short stories in a book titled Mijikanamonogatari (短物語, Short Story or Short Stories). ISBN 978-4-06-536177-1

==== Related book ====
- Audio drama script
  - Hyakumonogatari: Original Drama CD Scenario Book (佰物語: オリジナルドラマCD シナリオブック, Hyakumonogatari: Orijinaru Dorama Shīdī Shinario Bukku) (Kodansha. 2009. ISBN 978-4-06-215369-0)
- Character commentary script
  - Anime "Bakemonogatari" Supplementary Reading Book (1) (アニメ『化物語』副音声副読本(上), Anime Bakemonogatari Fukuonsei Fukudokuhon. 1.) (Kodansha. 2012. ISBN 978-4-06-283799-6)
  - Anime "Bakemonogatari" Supplementary Reading Book (2) (アニメ『化物語』副音声副読本(下), Anime Bakemonogatari Fukuonsei Fukudokuhon. 2.) (Kodansha. 2012. ISBN 978-4-06-283806-1)
  - Supplementary Story (1) Nisemonogatari & Nekomonogatari (Black) Supplementary Reading Book (副物語(上) アニメ偽物語&猫物語(黒)副音声副読本, Fukumonogatari (1): Anime Nisemonogatari ando Nekomonogatari Kuro Fukuonsei Fukudokuhon) (Kodansha. 2015. ISBN 978-4-06-219697-0)
  - Supplementary Story (2) Nisemonogatari & Nekomonogatari (Black) Supplementary Reading Book (副物語(下) アニメ偽物語&猫物語(黒)副音声副読本, Fukumonogatari (2): Anime Nisemonogatari ando Nekomonogatari Kuro Fukuonsei Fukudokuhon) (Kodansha. 2015. ISBN 978-4-06-219744-1)

=== Katanagatari series ===
This twelve volume samurai epic with illustrations by Take was released one volume a month throughout 2007.

First published	Title	ISBN
January 10, 2007	Katanagatari Chapter 1: Plane, the Absolute (刀語 第一話 絶刀・鉋, Katanagatari Dai Ichi Wa Zettō Kanna)	978-4-06-283611-1
February 2, 2007	Katanagatari Chapter 2: Blunt, the Decapitator (刀語 第二話 斬刀・鈍, Katanagatari Dai Ni Wa Zantō Namakura)	978-4-06-283604-3
March 2, 2007	Katanagatari Chapter 3: Blade, the Thousand (刀語 第三話 千刀・鎩, Katanagatari Dai San Wa Sentō Tsurugi)	978-4-06-283619-7
April 3, 2007	Katanagatari Chapter 4: Needle, the Fine (刀語 第四話 薄刀・針, Katanagatari Dai Yon Wa Hakutō Hari)	978-4-06-283623-4
May 8, 2007	Katanagatari Chapter 5: Aegis, the Resentment (刀語 第五話 賊刀・鎧, Katanagatari Dai Go Wa Zokutō Yoroi)	978-4-06-283628-9
June 5, 2007	Katanagatari Chapter 6: Hammer, the Dual-Edge (刀語 第六話 双刀・鎚, Katanagatari Dai Roku Wa Sōtō Kanadzuchi)	978-4-06-283631-9
July 3, 2007	Katanagatari Chapter 7: Destitute, the Vile (刀語 第七話 悪刀・鐚, Katanagatari Dai Nana Wa Akutō Bita)	978-4-06-283634-0
August 2, 2007	Katanagatari Chapter 8: Sai, the Minute (刀語 第八話 微刀・釵, Katanagatari Dai Hachi Wa Bitō Kanzashi)	978-4-06-283636-4
September 4, 2007	Katanagatari Chapter 9: Saw, the Imperator (刀語 第九話 王刀・鋸, Katanagatari Dai Kyū Wa Ōtō Nokogiri)	978-4-06-283639-5
October 2, 2007	Katanagatari Chapter 10: Scales, the Sincere (刀語 第十話 誠刀・銓, Katanagatari Dai Jū Wa Seitō Hakari)	978-4-06-283643-2
November 2, 2007	Katanagatari Chapter 11: Gilt, the Venomous (刀語 第十一話 毒刀・鍍, Katanagatari Dai Jū Ichi Wa Dokutō Mekki)	978-4-06-283648-7
December 4, 2007	Katanagatari Chapter 12: Gun, the Firearm (刀語 第十二話 炎刀・銃, Katanagatari Dai Jū Ni Wa Entō Jū)	978-4-06-283652-4

==== Maniwagatari ====
Maniwagatari takes place 200 years before Katanagatari, when the first Kyotōryū head, Kazune Yasuri, met Kiki Shikizaki.

First published	Title	ISBN
December 2, 2008	Maniwagatari: Maniwa Kōmori I, Maniwa Kuizame I, Maniwa Chōchō I, Maniwa Shirasagi I (真庭語 初代真庭蝙蝠 初代真庭喰鮫 初代真庭蝶々 初代真庭白鷺)	978-4-06-283687-6

==== Related book ====
- Audio drama script
  - Towazugatari: Original Drama CD Scenario Book (不問(トワズ)語: オリジナルドラマCD シナリオブック, Towazugatari: Orijinaru Dorama Shīdī Shinario Bukku) (Kodansha. 2010. ISBN 978-4-06-283734-7)

=== Densetsu series ===
A complete series with 10 volumes published by Kodansha. The first volume was published as the "Nisio's longest book" at the time of its publication. The cover of the final volume was illustrated by Fuu Midori.

First published	Title	ISBN
April 26, 2012	Himeiden (悲鳴伝)	978-4-06-182829-2
February 27, 2013	Hitsūden (悲痛伝)	978-4-06-182855-1
June 27, 2013	Hisanden (悲惨伝)	978-4-06-182879-7
November 26, 2013	Hihōden (悲報伝)	978-4-06-182888-9
July 3, 2014	Higōden (悲業伝)	978-4-06-299017-2
February 26, 2015	Hirokuden (悲録伝)	978-4-06-299044-8
November 25, 2015	Hibōden (悲亡伝)	978-4-06-299061-5
December 28, 2016	Hieiden (悲衛伝)	978-4-06-299089-9
February 28, 2018	Hikyūden (悲球伝)	978-4-06-299113-1
March 28, 2018	Hishūden (悲終伝)	978-4-06-299119-3

=== Medaka Box ===
Spin-off novels of the Medaka Box manga. Illustrated by Akira Akatsuki.

First published	Title	ISBN
May 2, 2012	Shōsetsu-ban Medaka Box (Jō) Kuguhara Messhi no Funuketa Kunrin Mata wa Naginōra Sanagi no Ashige ni Yoru Tōhyō (小説版めだかボックス (上) 久々原滅私の腑抜けた君臨または啝ノ浦さなぎの足蹴による投票)	978-4-08-703261-1
June 4, 2012	Shōsetsu-ban Medaka Box (Ge) Eburi Richigi no Oshitoyaka na Menjū Mata wa Mukueda Shikī no Haibanrōzeki Manifest (小説版めだかボックス (下) えぶり理知戯のおしとやかな面従または椋枝閾の杯盤狼藉マニフェスト)	978-4-08-703264-2
October 10, 2012	Medaka Box Gaiden Good Loser Kumagawa Shōsetsu-ban (Jō) Suisō ni Ugomeku Nō Darake (めだかボックス外伝 グッドルーザー球磨川 小説版【上】 『水槽に蠢く脳だらけ』)	978-4-08-703278-9
November 19, 2012	Medaka Box Gaiden Good Loser Kumagawa Shōsetsu-ban (Ge) Suisō Kanri no Zugzwang (めだかボックス外伝 グッドルーザー球磨川 小説版【下】 『水槽管理のツークツワンク』)	978-4-08-703280-2
October 4, 2013	Medaka Box Juvenile Shōsetsu-ban (めだかボックス ジュブナイル 小説版)	978-4-08-703300-7

==== Related book ====
- Kikaijima Report Animation Collection (喜界島れぽーと あにめーしょんこれくしょん) - Illustrated by Akira Akatsuki. It was distributed as a booklet at Medaka Box DVD Premium Event on March 3, 2013.
- Medaka Box Complete Guide Book (めだかボックス コンプリートガイドブック) - (Shueisha. 2013. ISBN 978-4-08-870876-8)

=== Bōkyaku Tantei series ===
Ongoing series with 15 volumes published by Kodansha. Illustrated by Vofan.

First published	Title	ISBN
October 15, 2014	Okitegami Kyōko no Bibōroku (掟上今日子の備忘録)	978-4-06-219202-6
April 23, 2015	Okitegami Kyōko no Suisenbun (掟上今日子の推薦文)	978-4-06-219450-1
August 19, 2015	Okitegami Kyōko no Chōsenjō (掟上今日子の挑戦状)	978-4-06-219712-0
October 6, 2015	Okitegami Kyōko no Yuigonsho (掟上今日子の遺言書)	978-4-06-219784-7
December 17, 2015	Okitegami Kyōko no Taishokunegai (掟上今日子の退職願)	978-4-06-219906-3
May 17, 2016	Okitegami Kyōko no Kon'intodoke (掟上今日子の婚姻届)	978-4-06-220071-4
August 23, 2016	Okitegami Kyōko no Kakeibo (掟上今日子の家計簿)	978-4-06-220270-1
November 17, 2016	Okitegami Kyōko no Ryokōki (掟上今日子の旅行記)	978-4-06-220376-0
May 24, 2017	Okitegami Kyōko no Urabyōshi (掟上今日子の裏表紙)	978-4-06-220576-4
January 19, 2018	Okitegami Kyōko no Iromihon (掟上今日子の色見本)	978-4-06-220875-8
October 5, 2018	Okitegami Kyōko no Jōshaken (掟上今日子の乗車券)	978-4-06-513204-3
March 18, 2020	Okitegami Kyōko no Sekkeizu (掟上今日子の設計図)	978-4-06-518990-0
April 22, 2021	Okitegami Kyōko no Kansatsu-hyō (掟上今日子の鑑札票)	978-4-06-522792-3
June 8, 2022	Okitegami Kyōko no Ninpō Chō (掟上今日子の忍法帖)	978-4-06-527703-4
April 16, 2025	Okitegami Kyōko no Hokenshō (掟上今日子の保険証)	978-4-06-539105-1

=== Jūni Taisen ===
After the one-shot publication in the one-shot series manga Ōgiri, the story told one day before those events was published in one volume by Shueisha on May 19, 2015, with the illustrations provided by Hikaru Nakamura. A sequel was released in 2017.

First published	Title	ISBN
May 19, 2015	Jūni Taisen (十二大戦)	978-4-08-780755-4
December 12, 2017	Jūni Taisen Tai Jūni Taisen (十二大戦対十二大戦)	978-4-08-703440-0

=== Bishōnen series ===
The "Pretty Boy Detective Club" was originally intended to be a group that would appear in the Bōkyaku Tantei series, but during the story's development, Nisio Isin decided it could be published as an independent title. Illustrated by Kinako. Twelve volumes were published by the Kodansha Taiga label.

First published	Title	ISBN
October 20, 2015	Bishōnen Tanteidan Kimi dake ni Hikari Kagayaku Ankokusei (美少年探偵団 きみだけに光かがやく暗黒星)	978-4-06-294001-6
December 18, 2015	Petenshi to Kūki Otoko to Bishōnen (ぺてん師と空気男と美少年)	978-4-06-294011-5
March 18, 2016	Yaneura no Bishōnen (屋根裏の美少年)	978-4-06-294023-8
September 20, 2016	Oshie to Tabisuru Bishōnen (押絵と旅する美少年)	978-4-06-294047-4
October 18, 2016	Panoramato Bidan (パノラマ島美談)	978-4-06-294049-8
March 22, 2017	Dizaka no Bishōnen (D坂の美少年)	978-4-06-294065-8
October 20, 2017	Bishōnen Isu (美少年椅子)	978-4-06-294095-5
May 23, 2018	Ryokui no Bishōnen (緑衣の美少年)	978-4-06-294122-8
October 24, 2018	Bishōnen Emu (美少年M)	978-4-06-513306-4
November 22, 2019	Bishōnen Tokage (Hikarihen) (美少年蜥蜴【光編】)	978-4-06-517422-7
December 20, 2019	Bishōnen Tokage (Kagehen) (美少年蜥蜴【影編】)	978-4-06-518009-9
May 14, 2021	Morugu-gai no Bishōnen (モルグ街の美少年)	978-4-06-523389-4

=== Henkyaku Kaitou series ===
For the 20th anniversary of Nisio's debut in 2022, a new series was announced. The next two books were announced in the afterword of Phantom Thief Flâneur's Patrol, with the series titled as The Casebook of the Phantom Thief Flâneur (怪盗フラヌールの事件簿). The series was later retitled as The Return of the Phantom Thief (返却怪盗). Illustrated by Takolegs.

First published	Title	ISBN
September 7, 2022	Phantom Thief Flâneur's Patrol (怪盗フラヌールの巡回)	978-4-06-529210-5
March 29, 2023	Retreat of Phantom Death March (怪人デスマーチの退転)	978-4-06-530630-7
October 17, 2024	Wonder Lady Flâneur (怪傑レディ・フラヌール)	978-4-06-534637-2

=== Novelizations ===
First published	Title	ISBN	Publisher
August 1, 2006	Death Note Another Note: The Los Angeles BB Murder Cases (アナザーノート — ロサンゼルスBB連続殺人事件, Death Note Anazā Nōto Rosanzerusu BB Renzoku Satsujin Jiken)	978-4-08-780439-3	Shueisha
August 2, 2006	xxxHolic: Another Holic Landolt-Ring Aerosol (×××HOLiC アナザーホリック ランドルト環エアロゾル, Horikku Anazāhorikku Randoruto-Kan Earozoru)	978-4-06-213509-2	Kodansha
December 16, 2011	JoJo's Bizarre Adventure Over Heaven	978-4-08-780630-4	Shueisha

=== Other works ===
Nisio Isin has also published several single-volume works, with some of them receiving manga adaptations. All of them deal with different themes from the usual. Ningyō ga Ningyō is a novel that invokes the style of old Japanese nonsense horror novels; Nanmin Tantei is a detective novel, a style always present in Nisio Isin's writing, but much more prominent in this title; Shōjo Fujūbun is a suspense novel, and Ripogura! is a novel that highlights Nisio Isin's love for constrained writing, based on three short stories rewritten three times each following restrained writing rules. The Veiled Man Hypothesis was Nisio's 100th book.

First published	Title	ISBN
September 7, 2005	Ningyō ga Ningyō (ニンギョウがニンギョウ)	978-4-06-182453-9
December 11, 2009	Nanmin Tantei (難民探偵)	978-4-06-215941-8
September 7, 2011	Shōjo Fujūbun (少女不十分); Book cover illustrated by Fuu Midori	978-4-06-182800-1
January 7, 2014	Lipogra! (りぽぐら!, Ripogura!) (Note: The Bunko edition (978-4-06-528242-7) released on June 15, 2022 contained an additional story, Chikyū ni supēsu wa nai (地球にスペースはない).)	978-4-06-182897-1
July 31, 2019	The Veiled Man Hypothesis (ヴェールドマン仮説); Book cover illustrated by Mai Yoneyama	978-4-06-516494-5
September 30, 2020	Delivery Room (デリバリールーム); Book cover illustrated by Samehoshi	978-4-06-520241-8
July 26, 2023	R.I.P. werther town (ウェルテルタウンでやすらかに); Book cover illustrated by Uichi Ukumo	978-4-06-530631-4
April 17, 2024	A Novel Titled: Tsukinu Kinu-Tateiwa Ōtsuribashi's Endless Essays (鬼怒楯岩大吊橋ツキヌの汲めども尽きぬ随筆という題名の小説); Book cover illustrated by Yuko Higuchi	978-4-06-535659-3

=== Uncollected works ===
==== Nakoto Manuscript series ====
Nakoto or Pnakotic Manuscript, referencing the grimoires H. P. Lovecraft created, has been releasing since 2004.

- Hypothetical Phenomenon (させられ現象, Saserare Genshō). Written in the Japanese magazine Eureka published by Seidosha in September 2004 issue. Illustrated by Akira Yamaguchi. (ISBN 978-4-7917-0124-7).
- A Fruit (ある果実, Aru Kajitsu). Illustrated by Yoko Nihombashi - Nisio Isin Chronicle (西尾維新クロニクル) (January 30, 2006. ISBN 978-4-7966-5092-2).
- Specifications of Glory (栄光の仕様, Eikō no Shiyō) - "Zaregoto Series Complete Box" (「戯言シリーズコンプリートBOX」) (September 1, 2006. ISBN 978-4-06-278852-6).
- The Irony of Iodine (ヨウ素の皮肉, Yōso no Hiniku). Released in the KOBO CAFE Limited Edition Special Booklet (KOBO CAFE限定特別小冊子) published by Kodansha in June 2008.
- First to End (〆に最初, Shime ni Saisho) - Anime Bakemonogatari Official Guidebook (アニメ化物語オフィシャルガイドブック) (June 30, 2009. ISBN 978-4-06-215498-7).
- Long Wait for a Little (とうとうの少々, Tōtō no Shōshō) - "New Authentic Magical Girl Risuka: The Perfect Book to Commemorate the Conclusion" (新本格魔法少女りすか 完結記念パーフェクトBOOK) - Distributed in December 2020.

==== Shuugatari ====
Stories written for the Pandora magazine published by Kodansha. Illustrated by Maruboro Akai.

- SIDE-A - Pandora Vol. 2 Side-A (『パンドラ』Vol. 2 SIDE-A) (October 9, 2008. ISBN 978-4-06-214910-5)
- SIDE-B - Pandora Vol. 2 Side-B (『パンドラ』Vol. 2 SIDE-B) (December 20, 2008. ISBN 978-4-06-215072-9)
- NO-SIDE - Pandora Vol. 3. (『パンドラ』Vol. 3.) (April 21, 2009. ISBN 978-4-06-215370-6)
- ONE-SIDE - Pandora Vol. 4. (『パンドラ』Vol. 4.) (August 21, 2009. ISBN 978-4-06-215547-2)
- A fifth chapter titled GENOCIDE was planned for publication in Pandora Vol. 5 but never released, presumably due to Pandora itself being suspended.

==== Katanagatari series ====
- A short story titled Katanagatari Yowa (刀語余話) was released as a leaflet accompanying the Twelve Pilgrimage Routes (大河饅頭 十二箇所巡) on December 13, 2010.

==== Sekai series ====
The fifth story titled My World (ぼくの世界, Boku no Sekai) was serialized in the Mephisto magazine published by Kodansha.

- Dai Ichi Toi "Higawari Sekigae Mondai" (第いち問「日替わり席替え問題」) - "Mephisto" 2009 Vol. 2. (『メフィスト』2009 Vol. 2.) (August 7, 2009. ISBN 978-4-06-215742-1)
- Dai Ni Toi "Shi-chan o Saifu Tōnan Jiken" (第に問「しーちゃんお財布盗難事件」) - "Mephisto" 2009 Vol. 3. (『メフィスト』2009 Vol. 3.) (December 8, 2009. ISBN 978-4-06-215990-6)

==== Monogatari series ====
Since the release of the Bakemonogatari Anime Complete Guidebook on October 28, 2010, Nisio Isin has written more than 60 short stories related to the anime or manga adaptation. The stories happen throughout all the timeline of the story featuring different narrators. They usually are brief stories talking about a specific topic, commentaries on literature, etc. Only the short stories in Mazemonogatari were collected in a book. Kodansha revealed in May 2024 that 32 previously published short stories and 6 new short stories were being collected in a book titled Mijikanamonogatari to be released July 3, 2024. However, on June 12, 2024, Kodansha announced that the book would be delayed after it was discovered that a story that should have been included was inadvertently left out. Kodansha later confirmed the publication date would be September 11, 2024, with 33 previously published and 6 new short stories.

==== Detective Urban Legend ====
A series written in the Mephisto magazine published by Kodansha.

- First time - "Detective Control Act" (第一回「探偵取締法」, Dai Ikkai「Tantei Torishimari-hō」) - "Mephisto" 2011 Vol. 3. (『メフィスト』2011 Vol. 3.) (December 7, 2011. ISBN 978-4-06-217483-1)
- Second time - "Detective Job Search" (第二回「探偵就職活動」, Dai Nikai 「Tantei Shūshoku Katsudō」) - "Mephisto" 2012 Vol. 1. (『メフィスト』2012 Vol. 1.) (April 5, 2012. ISBN 978-4-06-217703-0)
- Third time - "No Guide to Detective Fiction" (第三回「探偵小説不指南」, Dai Sankai 「Tantei Shōsetsu fu Shinan」) - "Mephisto" 2012 Vol. 2. (『メフィスト』2012 Vol. 2.) (August 7, 2012. ISBN 978-4-06-217862-4)

==== Summer Vacation Sabotage ====
A story written in the Mephisto magazine published by Kodansha.

- First time (第一回, Dai Ikkai) - "Mephisto" 2016 Vol. 2 (『メフィスト』2016 Vol. 2), August 4, 2016.

==== Bōkyaku Tantei series ====
Stories written for the Mephisto magazine published by Kodansha that were not collected yet.

- Okitegami Kyōko no Satsueikai (掟上今日子の撮影会) - "Mephisto" 2018 Vol. 2. (『メフィスト』2018 Vol. 2.), August 8, 2018.
- Okitegami Kyōko no Sawakai (掟上今日子の茶話会) - "Mephisto" 2018 Vol. 3. (『メフィスト』2018 Vol. 3.), December 6, 2018.
- Okitegami Kyōko no Undōkai (掟上今日子の運動会) - "Mephisto" 2019 Vol. 1. (『メフィスト』2019 Vol. 1.), April 10, 2019.
- Okitegami Kyōko no O Tomarikai (掟上今日子のお泊り会) - "Mephisto" 2019 Vol. 2. (『メフィスト』2019 Vol. 2.), August 8, 2019.
- Okitegami Kyōko no Zadankai (掟上今日子の座談会) - "Mephisto" 2019 Vol. 3. (『メフィスト』2019 Vol. 3.), December 4, 2019.
- Okitegami Kyōko no STAY HOLMES (掟上今日子のSTAY HOLMES)
  - A short story published on May 2, 2020, in a project titled Day to Day on the website tree.
- Okitegami Kyōko no Kikai Bunmei (掟上今日子の機械文明) - included in the Okitegami Kyōko no Kansatsu-hyō Special Free Paper distributed in the Japanese bookstores on April 27, 2021.

==== Derived from works by other authors ====
- Sokkuri (そっくり) - Yōkaihenge Kyōgoku Dō Toribyūto (『妖怪変化 京極堂トリビュート』) (December 14, 2007. ISBN 978-4-06-214475-9)
  - A tribute based on the Hyakkiyakō series by Natsuhiko Kyogoku.
- Shinri to Shiren (真理と試練) - Shōjo Fight 7 Special Edition (少女ファイト(7)特装版) written by Yoko Nihombashi. Published by Kodansha (July 1, 2010. ISBN 978-4-06-364836-2)
  - A story written in the official B5 booklet dōjin magazine titled Shōnen Fight.
- Ripogura no Shinobi (りぽぐらの忍び) - Nobunaga no Shinobi 8 (信長の忍び 8) (August 29, 2014. ISBN 978-4-592-14533-2)
  - A story written in commemoration of the 150th serialization of the Nobunaga no Shinobi series.

==== Misc. ====
- "Dawnless Night & Wakeless Dream" (明けない夜とさめない夢, Akenai Yoru to Samenai Yume) - Tandem Rotor no Hōhōron (タンデムローターの方法論) (November 3, 2002)
  - A story released in the dōjinshi magazine Tandem Rotor no Hōhōron in the first literary flea market on November 3, 2002.
- Keitai Risunā (携帯リスナー). Illustrated by Ōtarō Maijō - "Faust" Vol. 4 (『ファウスト』Vol. 4.) (December 24, 2004. ISBN 978-4-06-179446-7)
  - Competition on the theme of "coming to Tokyo".
- Dare ni mo tsudzukanai (誰にも続かない). Illustrated by Ōtarō Maijō - "Faust" Vol. 4 (『ファウスト』Vol. 4.) (December 24, 2004. ISBN 978-4-06-179446-7)
  - A relay novel with Otsuichi, Takekuni Kitayama, Yuya Sato and Tatsuhiko Takimoto.
- Mangaka Fuka Nō (漫画家孵化脳) - "Manga Box AMASIA" (『漫画BOX AMASIA』, "Manga Bokkusu AMASIA") (July 13, 2010. ISBN 978-4-06-364826-3)
- "Human Language #24014" (人間語 第24014回, Ningen-go Dai 24014-kai) - "Nishio Ishin Tsūshin" (『西尾維新通信』) (April 7, 2012, Kodansha)
- "Inhuman Language #24014" (人外語 第24014回, Jingai-go Dai 24014-kai) - "Nishio Ishin Tsūshin Vol. 2" (『西尾維新通信vol.2』) (December 24, 2012, Kodansha)
- Gestalt Zōchiku (ゲジュタルト増築) - "Mephisto" 2013 Vol. 3. (『メフィスト』2013 Vol. 3.) (December 5, 2013. ISBN 978-4-06-218767-1)
- "Fragment Novels" (Nisio Isin Official Website)
  - Self-Remix excerpts of his novels.
- "Street For You"
  - A short story published on August 28, 2020, in a project titled Story for you on the website tree.
- "Kozukata Mozu's Murder Manga Seminar" (不来方百舌鳥の殺人まんがゼミナール) - October issue of "Gendai Shousetsu" (September 22, 2022, Kodansha)
- "Kozukata Mozu's Murder Manga Seminar 2: The Guardian of Deadlines" (不来方百舌鳥の殺人まんがゼミナール２ 締め切りの守り人) - July issue of "Gendai Shousetsu" (June 22, 2023, Kodansha)
- "I was bored even before I was born" (生まれる前から倦まれてた) - "It was the first time I lied" (嘘をついたのは、初めてだった) Magazine (November 15, 2023, Kodansha)

=== Commentary on the literature ===
- Ryūsui Seiryōin - Carnival -Ichirin no Hana- (カーニバル 一輪の花, Kānibaru Ichirin no Hana) (Kodansha. January 1, 2003. ISBN 978-4-06-273642-8)
- Tatsuhiko Takimoto - Negative Happy Chainsaw Edge (ネガティブハッピー・チェーンソーエッヂ, Negatibu Happī, Chēnsō Ejji) (Kadowaka. June 25, 2004. ISBN 978-4-04-374701-6)
- Hiroshi Mori - You Broke the Diameter (Φは壊れたね, Fai Wa Kowaretane) (Kodansha. November 15, 2007. ISBN 978-4-06-275898-7)
- Natsuhiko Kyogoku - A Drop of Evil (邪魅の雫, Jami no Shizuku) (Kodansha. June 12, 2009. ISBN 978-4-06-276371-4)
- Yamori Mochizuki - Muboden~Twin Children~ (無貌伝〜双児の子ら〜, Muboden~Futago no Kora~) (Kodansha. August 6, 2009. On Kodansha's website (in Japanese))
- Mizuki Tsujimura - The God of Slow Heights. 2 (スロウハイツの神様. 下, Surō Haitsu no Kamisama. 2) (Kodansha. January 15, 2010. ISBN 978-4-06-276557-2)
- Takeru Kaido - Blaze Mes 1990 (ブレイズメス1990, Bureizu Mesu Senkyūhyaku Kujū.) (Kodansha. May 15, 2012. ISBN 978-4-06-277247-1)

== Manga ==
=== One-shots ===
Since the publication of the Hōkago, Nanajikan-me. one-shot in Comic Faust, Nisio Isin has been writing several original scripts for manga.

First published	Title	Artist	Publisher and Magazine
June 24, 2006	Hōkago, Nanajikan-me. (放課後、七時間目。)	Yun Kōga	Kōdansha; Comic Faust
January 4, 2008	Urōboe Uroboros! (うろおぼえウロボロス!)	Takeshi Obata	Shueisha; Weekly Shōnen Jump
August 11, 2014	Aru Asa Okitara (ある朝起きたら)	Yūya Kawada	Shueisha; Weekly Shōnen Jump Issue 37/38
August 11, 2014	Henshin Ganbō! (返信願望!)	Miyokawa Masaru	Shueisha; Weekly Shōnen Jump Issue 37/38
June 16, 2016	Seimitsu Kikai to Teki to Ningen (精密機械とてきとー人間)	Kei Takizawa	Shueisha; Weekly Young Jump Issue 27
December 11, 2017	Part Threes (パートスリーズ)	Kawashita Mizuki	Shueisha; Weekly Shōnen Jump Issue 2/3
December 29, 2017	Shōnenhō no Koro (少年法のコロ)	Iwasaki Yūji	Shueisha; Jump GIGA 2018 Winter Vol. 2
March 3, 2018	Kuzukago Mountain (くずかごマウンテン)	Iwasaki Yūji	Shueisha; Shōnen Jump+
January 25, 2019	Miemie no Omitto (見え見えのオミット)	Iwasaki Yūji	Shueisha; Jump GIGA 2019 Winter Vol. 2
September 14, 2019	Fukumen Tantei Mask de Holmes to Kiss Dorobō (覆面探偵 マスク・ド・ホームズとキス泥棒)	Saeki Shun and Tsukuda Yūto	Shueisha; Weekly Shōnen Jump; Issue 42 Jump Romcom Festival!
November 2, 2019	Tabitabi Demonstration (たびたびデーモンストレーション)	Akira Akatsuki	Shueisha; Jump Square
December 28, 2020	Matohazure Q-Doubu (まとはずれQ道部)	Iwasaki Yūji	Shueisha; Jump GIGA 2021 Winter
October 19, 2021	Cool Shock Old B.T. (魔老紳士ビーティー)	Posuka Demizu	Shueisha; Ultra Jump Issue November
December 19, 2023	Cool Shock Old B.T. ("Say Hi to Old Virginia" Incident) (魔老紳士ビーティー「婆シニアによろしく」事件)	Posuka Demizu	Shueisha; JOJO magazine 2023 WINTER
December 18, 2024	Cool Shock Guy B.T. The Smoker Under Arms Incident (魔好青年ビーティー 武装スモーカー事件)	Posuka Demizu	Shueisha; JOJO magazine 2024 WINTER
May 2, 2025	"Hagiya" no Migurimi (『剥ぎ屋』のミグルミ」)	Iwasaki Yūji	Shueisha; Jump GIGA 2025 Spring

==== Ōgiri ====
Based on 9 themes suggested by his editor, Nisio Isin wrote 9 one-shots with various artists that were released on Shueisha's magazines between 2014 and 2015 in a period of four months. The collection of stories were published by Shueisha on April 3, 2015 (ISBN 978-4-08-880389-0).

#	Title	Artist	Theme	Magazine	Year and Issue
1	Musume Iri Hako (娘入り箱)	Akira Akatsuki	Cardboard box (on a certain rainy day)	Weekly Shōnen Jump	2014-49
2	RKD-EK9	Takeshi Obata	Paradise	Jump SQ	2014-12
3	Nani Made Nara Koroseru? (「何までなら殺せる?」)	Akihisa Ikeda	Animal	Jump SQ	2014-12
4	Hunger Strike! (ハンガーストライキ!)	Teppei Fukushima	Hunger	Weekly Young Jump	2015-01
5	Koi Aru Dōguya (恋ある道具屋)	Aiji Yamakawa	(Finger) Ring	Bessatsu Margaret	2015-01
6	Offside o Oshiete (オフサイドを教えて)	Atsushi Nakayama	Soccer	Weekly Shōnen Jump	2015-03
7	Dōshitemo Kanaetai Tatta Hitotsu no Negai to Wari to Sō demo Nai 99 no Negai (どうしても叶えたいたったひとつの願いと割とそうでもない99の願い) (Note: This is the story told one day after the events in the Jūni Taisen novel.)	Hikaru Nakamura	Wish	Weekly Young Jump	2015-06/07
8	Bokura wa Zatsu ni wa Manabanai (僕らは雑には学ばない)	Mizuki Kawashita	Sweat	Weekly Shōnen Jump	2015-08
9	Tomodachi Inai Dōmei (友達いない同盟)	Renjūru Kindaichi	Conversation Drama	Jump SQ	2015-03

=== Medaka Box ===
Medaka Box is a Japanese shōnen manga series written by Nisio Isin and drawn by Akira Akatsuki. It was serialized in the Japanese magazine Weekly Shōnen Jump from May 11, 2009, to April 27, 2013. It was published by Shueisha in 22 volumes.

Vol.	First published	Title	ISBN
1	October 2, 2009	Seitokai o Shikkōsuru (生徒会を執行する)	978-4-08-874776-7
2	December 4, 2009	Wakatte Moraō Nante Omottenai yo (わかってもらおーなんて思ってないよ)	978-4-08-874778-1
3	February 4, 2010	Watashi wa Seito Kaichō da zo (私は生徒会長だぞ)	978-4-08-874799-6
4	April 2, 2010	Imōto, Imōto, Imōto da! (妹・妹・妹だ！)	978-4-08-870026-7
5	August 12, 2010	Futsū ni Kakkō Ii (普通に格好いい)	978-4-08-870076-2
6	September 3, 2010	Omae wa Nanno Tame ni Umaretekita? (お前は何のために生まれてきた？)	978-4-08-870106-6
7	November 4, 2010	Kore ga Furasuko Keikaku da (これがフラスコ計画だ)	978-4-08-870129-5
8	December 29, 2010	Suki daze (好きだぜ)	978-4-08-870166-0
9	March 4, 2011	Kurokami Kujira to Iu Ane wa (黒神くじらという姉は)	978-4-08-870194-3
10	May 2, 2011	Hajimemashite (初めまして)	978-4-08-870224-7
11	August 4, 2011	Ima mo Mukashi mo Sonna Kimi ga (今も昔もそんな君が)	978-4-08-870274-2
12	October 4, 2011	Dai Ichi Kanmon wa Nan'ido Bī (第一関門は難易度B)	978-4-08-870296-4
13	December 2, 2011	Meda Kanmon (めだ関門)	978-4-08-870319-0
14	March 2, 2012	Zenkichi-kun to Tatakau Mae ni (善吉くんと戦う前に)	978-4-08-870374-9
15	April 4, 2012	Kachi to wa Nanda? (勝ちとはなんだ？)	978-4-08-870421-0
16	July 4, 2012	Ikiru Koto wa Gekiteki da (生きることは劇的だ)	978-4-08-870467-8
17	September 4, 2012	Hakoniwa Gakuen dai hyaku Seitokai Shikkoubu (箱庭学園第百生徒会執行部)	978-4-08-870501-9
18	December 4, 2012	Kono Tatakai ga Owattara (この戦いが終わったら)	978-4-08-870536-1
19	February 4, 2013	Yōkoso Shiranui no Sato e (ようこそ不知火の里へ)	978-4-08-870620-7
20	April 4, 2013	Tsurubami Fukurō (鶴喰梟)	978-4-08-870650-4
21	June 4, 2013	Watashi wa Ningen ga Daisuki desu (私は人間が大好きです)	978-4-08-870685-6
22	September 4, 2013	Kurokami Medaka Kenzai Nari (黒神めだか健在なり)	978-4-08-870804-1

=== Kimi to Nadekko! ===
Kimi to Nadekko! is a Japanese shōjo manga series written by Nisio Isin and drawn by Ema Tōyama. It is an in-universe manga written and drawn by Nadeko Sengoku, a female character from the Monogatari series. The 3 chapters were released in various ways in 2014. All three chapters were collected as an extra in the Koimonogatari Volume 2 BD set.

First published	Title	Publication	ISBN / Issue / ASIN
January 30, 2014	Kimi to Nadekko! Dai Ichi Wa (キミとなでっこ!第1話)	Heroine Book #4: Sengoku Nadeko	ISBN 978-4-06-218794-7
June 28, 2014	Kimi to Nadekko! Dai Ni Wa (キミとなでっこ!第2話)	Kōdansha, Aria magazine.	August 2014 Issue
July 23, 2014	Kimi to Nadekko! Dai San Wa (キミとなでっこ!第3話)	Koimonogatari BD/DVD vol. 2	ASIN B00GTMRXCG

=== Shōnen Shōjo ===
Shōnen Shōjo is a Japanese shōnen manga series written by Nisio Isin and drawn by Akira Akatsuki. Shōnen Shōjo began serialization on January 4, 2016, and was published in Jump Square magazine until April 4, 2017, with a total of 16 chapters. Compiled by Shueisha into 3 volumes.

Vol.	First published	Title	ISBN
1	June 3, 2016	Shōnen Shōjo 1 (症年症女 1)	978-4-08-880710-2
2	November 4, 2016	Shōnen Shōjo 2 (症年症女 2)	978-4-08-880816-1
3	May 2, 2017	Shōnen Shōjo 3 (症年症女 3)	978-4-08-881082-9

=== Seishun Kijinden! 240 Gakuen ===
Legend of Eccentric Youth! Nishio Academy (青春奇人伝！240学園, "240" is a pun with "Nishio") is a Japanese shōnen manga series drafted by Nisio Isin and drawn by Shiba Mochi. It was done in commemoration of the 15th year of Nisio Isin writing career and it features various characters from his other series. It began serialization on February 9, 2017, in Bessatsu Shōnen Magazine until November 9, 2018. Compiled by Kodansha into 3 volumes.

Vol.	First published	Title	ISBN
1	August 9, 2017	Seishun Kijinden! 240 Gakuen (1) (青春奇人伝！240学園（1）)	978-4-06-510119-3
2	April 9, 2018	Seishun Kijinden! 240 Gakuen (2) (青春奇人伝！240学園（2）)	978-4-06-511199-4
3	December 7, 2018	Seishun Kijinden! 240 Gakuen (3) (青春奇人伝！240学園（3）)	978-4-06-513476-4

=== Cipher Academy ===
Cipher Academy (暗号学園のいろは, Angō Gakuen no Iroha) is a Japanese shōnen manga written by Nisio Isin and drawn by Iwasaki Yūji. It started serializing in the Japanese magazine Weekly Shōnen Jump on November 21, 2022, and finished on February 5, 2024.

Vol.	First published	Title	ISBN
1	March 3, 2023	Cipher Academy 1 (暗号学園のいろは 1, Angō Gakuen no Iroha 1)	978-4-08-883439-9
2	May 2, 2023	Cipher Academy 2 (暗号学園のいろは 2, Angō Gakuen no Iroha 2)	978-4-08-883531-0
3	August 4, 2023	Cipher Academy 3 (暗号学園のいろは 3, Angō Gakuen no Iroha 3)	978-4-08-883594-5
4	October 4, 2023	Cipher Academy 4 (暗号学園のいろは 4, Angō Gakuen no Iroha 4)	978-4-08-883669-0
5	January 4, 2024	Cipher Academy 5 (暗号学園のいろは 5, Angō Gakuen no Iroha 5)	978-4-08-883795-6
6	March 4, 2024	Cipher Academy 6 (暗号学園のいろは 6, Angō Gakuen no Iroha 6)	978-4-08-883846-5
7	May 2, 2024	Cipher Academy 7 (暗号学園のいろは 7, Angō Gakuen no Iroha 7)	978-4-08-884021-5

== Screenplays ==
- Audiobook
  - R.I.P. werther town (ウェルテルタウンでやすらかに) (Kodansha, Audible. December 29, 2022)
    - A novel written first for the audio service Audible. Kenichi Suzumura narrated the story. Kodansha released the print version on July 26, 2023.
- Character commentary
  - Audio commentaries are content available on the DVD/BD release of the Monogatari series and Kubikiri Cycle. Each episode features two characters having a conversation about the specific episode they are in. Nisio Isin has written each one of them.
  - Nisio Isin Daijiten
    - A series of commentaries in the form of an audio guide with characters from Monogatari, Zaregoto, and Bōkyaku Tantei series written for the Nisio Isin Daijiten exhibition, held in Tokyo during 2017. A transcription of said audio guide has been published in the accompany pamphlet. Nisio Isin in this occasion also wrote the script for six FANDA Cards handed as a gift at the exhibition's visitors, each one with a different character giving a call on the phone of the visitors.
- Drama CD
  - Monogatari series
    - Hyakumonogatari Original Drama CD (オリジナルドラマCD 佰物語, Hyaku Monogatari: Orijinaru Dorama CD) (Kodansha. August 3, 2009)
    - Monogatari Fes ~10th Anniversary Story~ MEMORIAL ALBUM (<物語>フェス 〜10th Anniversary Story〜 MEMORIAL ALBUM) (Aniplex. December 18, 2019)
  - Katanagatari series
    - Towazugatari Original Drama CD (不問語(トワズガタリ): オリジナルドラマCD, Towazugatari: Orijinaru Dorama CD) (Kodansha. 2010)
    - Episode 0 Kyotō Yasuri - An audiobook released in the DVD/BD of the twelve episodes of the Katanagatari anime. It contains 12 chapters telling the story in the rebellion twenty years before the main story.
  - Medaka Box
    - Medaka Box Juvenile (めだかボックス ジュブナイル), in 12 parts (Media Factory. 2012–2013)
  - Pretty Boy Detective Club
    - Pretty Boy Aesthetics "Aestheticism of Authenticity" Act 1 (Problem) Act 2 (Solution) (美少年耽々編『真贋鑑定の耽美』Act1（問題編）Act2（解決編）) (Aniplex. 2021)
    - Pretty Boy Aesthetics "Aestheticism of Recoloring" Act 1 (Problem) Act 2 (Solution) (美少年耽々編『お色直しの耽美』Act1（問題編）Act2（解決編）) (Aniplex. 2021)
    - Pretty Boy Aesthetics "Aestheticism of Difference" Act 1 (Problem) Act 2 (Solution) (美少年耽々編『すれ違いの耽美』Act1（問題編）Act2（解決編）) (Aniplex. 2021)
    - Pretty Boy Aesthetics "Aestheticism of One Sheet of Genkō Yōshi" Act 1 (Problem) Act 2 (Solution) (美少年耽々編『原稿用紙一枚分の耽美』Act1（問題編） Act2（解決編）) (Aniplex. 2021)
    - Pretty Boy Aesthetics "Pretty Boy Detective Club: The Last Indulgence" Last 1 (Problem) Last 2 (Grand Finale) (美少年耽々編『美少年探偵団 最後の耽美』LAST1（問題編） LAST2（大団円）) (Aniplex. 2022)
- Script
  - Medaka Box (TV)
    - Episode 12 - Even Without Medaka Kurokami (黒神めだかがいなくても, Kurokami Medaka ga Inakute mo) - Original air date: June 20, 2012.
  - Medaka Box Abnormal (TV)
    - Episode 12 - Medaka Box Extra Edition: Good Loser Kumagawa (めだかボックス番外編: グッドルーザー球磨川, Medaka Bokkusu Bangaihen: Guddo Rūzā Kumagawa) - Original air date: December 27, 2012.
  - Madoka Magica x Monogatari manner movies
    - Four skits written by Nisio Isin about theater manners that were presented in the Japanese sessions for Puella Magi Madoka Magica The Movie -Rebellion- between October 26 and November 22, 2013.
      - 1st week (October 26 – November 1): Ōgi Oshino Version
      - 2nd week (November 2 – 8): Karen Araragi & Tsukihi Araragi Version
      - 3rd week (November 9 – 15): Mayoi Hachikuji Version
      - 4th week (November 16 – 22): Hitagi Senjōgahara Version
  - Okitegami Kyōko no Bibōroku x Monogatari PVs. (2014. Directed by Yukihiro Miyamoto)
    - Two advertisements for the first e-book of Nisio Isin, Okitegami Kyōko no Bibōroku, from the Bōkyaku Tantei series.
  - Madogatari (Madoka Magica x Monogatari crossover)
    - A crossover manner video shown in the Madogatari exhibition on September 22, 2016.
  - Monogatari series in 120 seconds
    - PV for the release of the final volumes of the Monogatari series, Shinomonogatari. Script written by Nisio Isin with Kana Hanazawa and Maaya Sakamoto voicing in-character, Nadeko Sengoku and Shinobu Oshino, respectively.
  - Nisio Isin 20th anniversary movie
    - A short video published on August, 7th and narrated by Zaregoto series' protagonist Ii in which Nisio Isin's career is summarized and volume 10 of said series is announced.
  - Urgent Conversation! Nonsense User x Koyomi Araragi
    - A 17-minute video released at the conclusion of the Nisio Isin 20th anniversary celebrations. In this video story written by Nisio Isin, the protagonists of Zaregoto and Monogatari, Ii and Koyomi, are portrayed by their respective anime VAs.
  - Ikusamonogatari Message Movie
    - An animated video produced by whitepuzzle and written by Nisio Isin within the context of the Ikusamonogatari novel.
  - Magi Yotsugi☆Peace
    - A 12-episode short series crossover between Puella Magi Madoka Magica and Monogatari series.

== Related books ==
- Eureka September 2004 Extra Issue Special Edition feat. Nisio Isin (ユリイカ2004年9月臨時増刊号 総特集 西尾維新, Yuriika 2004-nen 9-tsuki Rinji Zōkan-gō Sō Tokushū Nishio Ishin) (September 18, 2004. Seidosha. ISBN 978-4-7917-0124-7)
- Burandjisshu? (ぶらんでぃっしゅ?) (November 1, 2005. Gentosha. ISBN 978-4-344-01070-3)
  - Written by Ryūsui Seiryōin. Nisio cooperated as a special guest.
- Nisio Isin Chronicle (西尾維新クロニクル, Nishio Ishin Kuronikuru) (January 30, 2006. Takarajimasha Co. ISBN 978-4-7966-5092-2)
  - Fan book containing an interview with Nisio Isin.
- Hiroshi Mori Book: From Work Guide to Garden (森博嗣本―作品ガイドからお庭まで, Morihiroshi Hon ― Sakuhin Gaido Kara o Niwa Made) (February 1, 2006. Takarajimasha Co. ISBN 978-4-7966-5143-1)
  - Contains a dialogue with Nisio Isin.
- Mori Log Academy 9 (モリログ・アカデミィ 9) (March 12, 2008. Media Factory. ISBN 978-4-8401-2197-2)
  - Nisio Isin lectured for five days as a special guest.
- Nisio Isin Dialogue Collection Main Question (西尾維新対談集 本題, Nishio Ishin Taidan-shū Hondai) (September 3, 2014. Kodansha. ISBN 978-4-06-219107-4)
  - Interview book where Nisio talks with Kentarō Kobayashi, Hiromu Arakawa, Chica Umino, Mizuki Tsujimura, and Toshiyuki Horie.
- 240Q, a free paper commemorating the 20th anniversary of Nisio Isin's debut (西尾維新デビュー20周年記念フリーペーパー「240Q」, Nishio Ishin Debyū 20 Shuunen Kinen Furī Pēpā (240Q)) (September 5, 2022). Kodansha.
  - Nisio answers 240 questions of fans.

== Adaptations ==
=== Anime ===
TV
Title	# of episodes	Broadcast date	Director	Studio
xxxHolic (episode 17, "Jishō")	1	July 27, 2006	Tsutomu Mizushima	Production I.G.
Bakemonogatari	15 (Note: Bakemonogatari was planned to have 15 episodes, but due to Japanese TV scheduling, only the first 12 episodes aired on TV. The remaining 3 episodes were distributed online.)	July 3, 2009 – June 26, 2010	Akiyuki Shinbo; Tatsuya Oishi (Series)	Shaft
Katanagatari	12	January 25 – December 10, 2010	Keitaro Motonaga	White Fox
Nisemonogatari	11	January 7 – March 17, 2012	Akiyuki Shinbo; Tomoyuki Itamura (Series)	Shaft
Medaka Box	12	April 4 – June 20, 2012	Shouji Saeki	Gainax
Medaka Box Abnormal	12	October 10 – December 26, 2012	Shouji Saeki	Gainax
Nekomonogatari (Kuro)	4	December 31, 2012	Akiyuki Shinbo (Chief); Tomoyuki Itamura	Shaft
Monogatari Series Second Season	23	July 6 – December 28, 2013	Akiyuki Shinbo (Chief); Tomoyuki Itamura; Naoyuki Tatsuwa (Series, #6–9); Yuki Yase (Series, #14–17)	Shaft
Hanamonogatari	5	August 16, 2014	Akiyuki Shinbo (Chief); Tomoyuki Itamura	Shaft
Tsukimonogatari	4	December 31, 2014	Akiyuki Shinbo (Chief); Tomoyuki Itamura	Shaft
Owarimonogatari (vol.1-2)	13	October 4 – December 20, 2015	Akiyuki Shinbo (Chief); Tomoyuki Itamura	Shaft
Owarimonogatari (vol.3)	7	August 12–13, 2017	Akiyuki Shinbo (Chief); Tomoyuki Itamura	Shaft
Juni Taisen: Zodiac War	12	October 3 – December 19, 2017	Naoto Hosoda	Graphinica
Zoku Owarimonogatari (Note: Although Zoku Owarimonogatari was screened on theaters, the producers said it is a production for TV. Also, the director Akiyuki Shinbo said in an interview for the website Natalie the producers decided Zoku Owarimonogatari would be a production for TV, but there were still some elements of film production, like the 5.1 audio channel.)	6	May 18 – June 22, 2019 (Note: Zoku Owarimonogatari was first screened on theaters in Japan on November 10, 2018. Later, the 6 episodes were broadcast on TV.)	Akiyuki Shinbo	Shaft
Pretty Boy Detective Club	12	April 11 – June 27, 2021	Akiyuki Shinbo (Chief); Hajime Ootani	Shaft
ONA
Title	# of episodes	Release date	Director	Studio
Koyomimonogatari	12	January 9 – March 27, 2016	Akiyuki Shinbo (Chief); Tomoyuki Itamura	Shaft
Monogatari Off & Monster Season	14	July 6, 2024 – October 19, 2024	Akiyuki Shinbo (Chief); Midori Yoshizawa	Shaft
Film
Title	—	Premiere	Director	Studio
Kizumonogatari I: Tekketsu-hen	—	January 8, 2016	Akiyuki Shinbo (Chief); Tatsuya Oishi	Shaft
Kizumonogatari II: Nekketsu-hen	—	August 19, 2016	Akiyuki Shinbo (Chief); Tatsuya Oishi	Shaft
Kizumonogatari III: Reiketsu-hen	—	January 6, 2017	Akiyuki Shinbo (Chief); Tatsuya Oishi	Shaft
OVA
Title	# of episodes	Release date	Director	Studio
Koyomi History	1	September 22, 2016	Akio Watanabe	Shaft
Kubikiri Cycle: Aoiro Savant to Zaregoto Tsukai	8	October 26, 2016 – September 27, 2017	Akiyuki Shinbo (Chief); Yuki Yase	Shaft

=== Manga ===
Nisio Isin has several adaptations of his novels for manga and since most of his novels are published by Kodansha, most of them comes out in magazines of the publisher.

==== Zerozaki Sōshiki no Ningen Shiken ====
First serialized in Pandora Vol. 2 Side-A, it was later transferred to the Japanese magazine Monthly Afternoon from September 24, 2011, to August 24, 2013. It is an adaptation of the first volume of the Ningen series and it was drawn by Iruka Shiomiya. Compiled by Kodansha in 5 volumes.

Vol.	First published	Title	ISBN
1	December 22, 2011	Zerozaki Sōshiki no Ningen Shiken (1) (零崎双識の人間試験（1）)	978-4-06-310795-1
2	May 23, 2012	Zerozaki Sōshiki no Ningen Shiken (2) (零崎双識の人間試験（2）)	978-4-06-387822-6
3	December 19, 2012	Zerozaki Sōshiki no Ningen Shiken (3) (零崎双識の人間試験（3）)	978-4-06-358418-9
4	April 23, 2013	Zerozaki Sōshiki no Ningen Shiken (4) (零崎双識の人間試験（4）)	978-4-06-387882-0
5	October 23, 2013	Zerozaki Sōshiki no Ningen Shiken (5) (零崎双識の人間試験（5）)	978-4-06-387930-8

==== Zerozaki Kishishiki no Ningen Knock ====
It was serialized in the Japanese magazine Monthly Afternoon from August 25, 2014, to September 24, 2016. It is an adaptation of the second volume of the Ningen series and it was drawn by Chomoran. Compiled by Kodansha in 4 volumes.

Vol.	First published	Title	ISBN
1	January 23, 2015	Zerozaki Kishishiki no Ningen Knock (1) (零崎軋識の人間ノック（1）)	978-4-06-388029-8
2	August 21, 2015	Zerozaki Kishishiki no Ningen Knock (2) (零崎軋識の人間ノック（2）)	978-4-06-388076-2
3	March 23, 2016	Zerozaki Kishishiki no Ningen Knock (3) (零崎軋識の人間ノック（3）)	978-4-06-388131-8
4	November 22, 2016	Zerozaki Kishishiki no Ningen Knock (4) (零崎軋識の人間ノック（4）)	978-4-06-388213-1

==== Okitegami Kyōko no Bibōroku ====
It was serialized in the Japanese magazine Monthly Shonen Magazine from August 6, 2015, to March 6, 2017. It partially adapts volumes 1 to 8 of the Bōkyaku Tantei series and it was drawn by Yō Asami. Compiled by Kodansha in 5 volumes.

Vol.	First published	Title	ISBN
1	October 16, 2015	Okitegami Kyōko no Bibōroku (1) (掟上今日子の備忘録（1）)	978-4-06-377343-9
2	April 15, 2016	Okitegami Kyōko no Bibōroku (2) (掟上今日子の備忘録（2）)	978-4-06-377446-7
3	August 17, 2016	Okitegami Kyōko no Bibōroku (3) (掟上今日子の備忘録（3）)	978-4-06-393024-5
4	January 17, 2017	Okitegami Kyōko no Bibōroku (4) (掟上今日子の備忘録（4）)	978-4-06-393118-1
5	April 17, 2017	Okitegami Kyōko no Bibōroku (5) (掟上今日子の備忘録（5）)	978-4-06-393180-8

==== Shōjo Fujūbun ====
Shōjo Fujūbun is an adaptation of the novel with the same name and was drawn by Mitsuru Hattori. Mitsuri wanted to adapt the novel after reading it. It was serialized between November 30, 2015 and August 29, 2016, in the Japanese magazine Weekly Young Magazine. It was compiled by Kodansha in 3 volumes.

Vol.	First published	Title	ISBN
1	May 6, 2016	Shōjo Fujūbun (1) (少女不十分（1）)	978-4-06-382783-5
2	August 5, 2016	Shōjo Fujūbun (2) (少女不十分（2）)	978-4-06-382832-0
3	October 6, 2016	Shōjo Fujūbun (3) (少女不十分（3）)	978-4-06-382860-3

==== Himeiden ====
It was serialized in the Japanese magazine Young Magazine Third from December 4, 2015 to December 6, 2017. It is an adaptation of the first volume of the Densetsu series and it was drawn by Mitsutani Osamu. Compiled by Kodansha in 4 volumes.

Vol.	First published	Title	ISBN
1	May 6, 2016	Himeiden (1) (悲鳴伝（1）)	978-4-06-382794-1
2	December 20, 2016	Himeiden (2) (悲鳴伝（2）)	978-4-06-382895-5
3	June 20, 2017	Himeiden (3) (悲鳴伝（3）)	978-4-06-382983-9
4	January 19, 2018	Himeiden (4) (悲鳴伝（4）)	978-4-06-510714-0

==== Bishōnen Tanteidan ====
It was serialized in the Japanese magazine Aria from June 2016 until June 2018 because of Aria's termination. It was transferred to Shonen Magazine Edge on October 17, 2018 and the rest of the chapters were released until July 17, 2019. It is an adaptation of the first four volumes of the Bishōnen series, and it was drawn by Oda Suzuka. Compiled by Kodansha in 5 volumes.

Vol.	First published	Title	ISBN
1	September 7, 2016	Bishōnen Tanteidan (1) (美少年探偵団（1）)	978-4-06-380874-2
2	February 7, 2017	Bishōnen Tanteidan (2) (美少年探偵団（2）)	978-4-06-380905-3
3	August 7, 2017	Bishōnen Tanteidan (3) (美少年探偵団（3）)	978-4-06-380941-1
4	June 7, 2018	Bishōnen Tanteidan (4) (美少年探偵団（4）)	978-4-06-511826-9
5	September 6, 2019	Bishōnen Tanteidan (5) (美少年探偵団（5）)	978-4-06-517028-1

==== Jūni Taisen ====
It was serialized in the Japanese magazine Shonen Jump+ from September 23, 2017, to May 12, 2018. It is an adaptation of the Jūni Taisen novel and it was drawn by Akira Akatsuki. Compiled by Shueisha in 4 volumes.

Vol.	First published	Title	ISBN
1	November 2, 2017	Jūni Taisen 1 (十二大戦 1)	978-4-08-881270-0
2	January 4, 2018	Jūni Taisen 2 (十二大戦 2)	978-4-08-881328-8
3	April 4, 2018	Jūni Taisen 3 (十二大戦 3)	978-4-08-881371-4
4	July 4, 2018	Jūni Taisen 4 (十二大戦 4)	978-4-08-881418-6

==== Bakemonogatari ====
Bakemonogatari is an adaptation of the Monogatari series novels and is drawn by Oh! great. It began its serialization in Weekly Shōnen Magazine on March 14, 2018, with the last chapter published on March 15, 2023. It has been compiled by Kodansha with a special edition for the Kodansha Box label also published.

Vol.	First published	Title	ISBN
1	June 15, 2018	Bakemonogatari (1) (化物語（1）)	978-4-06-511617-3
2	August 17, 2018	Bakemonogatari (2) (化物語（2）)	978-4-06-512333-1
3	November 16, 2018	Bakemonogatari (3) (化物語（3）)	978-4-06-513313-2
4	January 17, 2019	Bakemonogatari (4) (化物語（4）)	978-4-06-513938-7
5	April 17, 2019	Bakemonogatari (5) (化物語（5）)	978-4-06-514889-1
6	July 17, 2019	Bakemonogatari (6) (化物語（6）)	978-4-06-515314-7
7	October 17, 2019	Bakemonogatari (7) (化物語（7）)	978-4-06-517166-0
8	February 17, 2020	Bakemonogatari (8) (化物語（8）)	978-4-06-518172-0
9	May 15, 2020	Bakemonogatari (9) (化物語（9）)	978-4-06-518853-8
10	August 17, 2020	Bakemonogatari (10) (化物語（10）)	978-4-06-520334-7
11	November 17, 2020	Bakemonogatari (11) (化物語（11）)	978-4-06-521256-1
12	February 17, 2021	Bakemonogatari (12) (化物語（12）)	978-4-06-522070-2
13	May 17, 2021	Bakemonogatari (13) (化物語（13）)	978-4-06-523142-5
14	August 17, 2021	Bakemonogatari (14) (化物語（14）)	978-4-06-524481-4
15	November 17, 2021	Bakemonogatari (15) (化物語（15）)	978-4-06-526005-0
16	February 17, 2022	Bakemonogatari (16) (化物語（16）)	978-4-06-526895-7
17	May 17, 2022	Bakemonogatari (17) (化物語（17）)	978-4-06-527912-0
18	August 17, 2022	Bakemonogatari (18) (化物語（18）)	978-4-06-528659-3
19	November 17, 2022	Bakemonogatari (19) (化物語（19）)	978-4-06-529635-6
20	January 17, 2023	Bakemonogatari (20) (化物語（20）)	978-4-06-530347-4
21	March 16, 2023	Bakemonogatari (21) (化物語（21）)	978-4-06-530921-6
22	May 17, 2023	Bakemonogatari (22) (化物語（22）)	978-4-06-531575-0

==== Risuka ====
- As part of the release of the fourth volume of the series, Hiro Mashima drew a scene from the chapter Easy magic cannot be used. of the first volume and Kodansha released it via Twitter on November 27, 2020. It was later published in the book "New Authentic Magical Girl Risuka: The Perfect Book to Commemorate the Conclusion" (新本格魔法少女りすか 完結記念パーフェクトBOOK) distributed in the Japanese bookstores.
- A manga adaptation serialized on Bessatsu Shōnen Magazine from April 9, 2021, to February 9, 2024. Nao Emoto handled the illustration. Compiled by Kodansha in 7 volumes.

Vol.	First published	Title	ISBN
1	August 17, 2021	Shin Honkaku Mahō Shōjo Risuka (1) (新本格魔法少女りすか（1）)	978-4-06-523154-8
2	November 17, 2021	Shin Honkaku Mahō Shōjo Risuka (2) (新本格魔法少女りすか（2）)	978-4-06-525983-2
3	March 9, 2022	Shin Honkaku Mahō Shōjo Risuka (3) (新本格魔法少女りすか（3）)	978-4-06-527268-8
4	July 8, 2022	Shin Honkaku Mahō Shōjo Risuka (4) (新本格魔法少女りすか（4）)	978-4-06-528379-0
5	April 7, 2023	Shin Honkaku Mahō Shōjo Risuka (5) (新本格魔法少女りすか（5）)	978-4-06-531288-9
6	November 11, 2023	Shin Honkaku Mahō Shōjo Risuka (6) (新本格魔法少女りすか（6）)	978-4-06-533506-2
7	April 9, 2024	Shin Honkaku Mahō Shōjo Risuka (7) (新本格魔法少女りすか（7）)	978-4-06-535165-9

=== TV Drama ===
Japanese drama. It adapted the first four volumes of the Bōkyaku Tantei series. Starring Yui Aragaki.

Title	Episodes	Broadcast date	Director	Network
Okitegami Kyōko no Bibōroku	10	October 10 – December 12, 2015	Tōya Satō; Yoshinori Shigeyama; Naoko Komuro	NTV

=== Stage Play ===
- Juni Taisen (2018)
- Labyrinth Revue: Bishounen Tanteidan (2021)
