= Pretty Boy Detective Club =

Japanese novel and anime series

- First novel volume cover

美少年探偵団 (Bishōnen Tanteidan)
- Genre: Mystery; Coming-of-age
- Created by: Nisio Isin
- Novel series
- Written by: Nisio Isin
- Illustrated by: Kinako
- Published by: Kodansha
- English publisher: NA: Vertical
- Imprint: Kodansha Taiga
- Original run: October 20, 2015 – May 14, 2021
- Volumes: 12
- Manga
- Written by: Nisio Isin
- Illustrated by: Suzuka Oda
- Published by: Kodansha
- English publisher: NA: Vertical
- Magazine: Aria; Shōnen Magazine Edge
- Original run: April 28, 2016 – July 17, 2019
- Volumes: 5
- Anime television series
- Directed by: Akiyuki Shinbo (Note: Chief Director (総監督).); Hajime Ootani; Kenjirou Okada (Note: Assistant Director (副監督). See the Shaft directors credit legend.)
- Produced by: Yōhei Itō (Kodansha); Tatsuya Ishikawa (Aniplex); Norihiko Kusano (ABC Animation)
- Written by: Series composition: Akiyuki Shinbo; Shaft (Note: Credited as Fuyashi Tou (東冨耶子).); Scripts: Yukito Kizawa
- Music by: Masatomo Ota; EFFY
- Studio: Shaft
- Licensed by: NA: Aniplex of America
- Original network: ANN (ABC, TV Asahi)
- Original run: April 11, 2021 – June 27, 2021
- Episodes: 12

Pretty Boy Detective Club (Japanese: 美少年探偵団, Hepburn: Bishōnen Tanteidan), also known as the Bishōnen Series (美少年シリーズ), is a Japanese mystery novel series written by Nisio Isin and illustrated by Kinako. Kodansha released twelve volumes from October 2015 to May 2021 under their Kodansha Taiga label. A manga adaptation with art by Suzuka Oda was serialized from 2016 to 2019. It was collected in five tankōbon volumes. Both the novel series and the manga are licensed in North America by Vertical. An anime television series adaptation by Shaft aired from April 11 to June 27, 2021, on ABC and TV Asahi's Animazing!!! programming block.

== Plot ==
Mayumi Dōjima, a middle school student, searches for a "star" she witnessed ten years earlier, which she must find before her fourteenth birthday in order to keep her promise of becoming an astronaut. With time running out, she encounters the Pretty Boy Detective Club, a group of eccentric and wealthy boys at her school led by Manabu Sotoin, who agree to take on her case.

As they investigate, the club discovers that the "star" Mayumi saw was not a celestial body, but the launch of a secret satellite. This revelation draws the attention of mysterious individuals connected to the incident, leading to Mayumi's abduction. The club rescues her and uncovers that her exceptional eyesight is the reason she became a target. After the incident, Mayumi abandons her original goal of becoming an astronaut and joins the club, adopting its philosophy of pursuing beauty through mystery-solving.

== Characters ==
Mayumi Dojima (瞳島 眉美, Dōjima Mayumi)
Voiced by: Maaya Sakamoto (Japanese); Suzie Yeung (English)
The main protagonist of the series. Year 2, class B at Yubiwa Academy Middle School. She becomes the student council president in Dizaka no Bishōnen.
She became involved with the Pretty Boy Detective Club in a case involving a star that she had been searching for ten years. Following the resolution of the case, she has been dressing up as a man and visiting the club. She has become a regular member since The Pretty Boy in the Attic. She has excessively-good eyesight and usually wears glasses to suppress it. She is also known as "Mayumi the Seer."
She also appears in Mazemonogatari, a collaborative novel with the Monogatari series. Under the direction of Manabu, she visits the North White Snake Shrine to observe the heavens.
Manabu Sotoin (双頭院 学, Sōtōin Manabu)
Voiced by: Ayumu Murase (Japanese); Griffin Burns (English)
5th grade, class A at Yubiwa Academy Elementary School. His nickname is Kogoro (fifth grader → Kogo). The leader of the Pretty Boy Detective Club. Also known as "Manabu the Aesthete." Mayumi calls him "the leader."
He claims to be uneducated and acts cheerfully and arrogantly without reading the atmosphere but always seeks beauty and will not do anything that goes against aesthetics. Although he often does nothing but give orders, he is recognized as a leader by the group.
Nagahiro Sakiguchi (咲口 長広, Sakiguchi Nagahiro)
Voiced by: Taito Ban (Japanese); Howard Wang (English)
Year 3, class A at Yubiwa Academy Middle School. Former student council president. Vice leader of the Pretty Boy Detective Club. Also known as "Nagahiro the Orator." After Michiru pointed out to Mayumi in Oshie to Tabisuru Bishōnen that she was calling him "Sakiguchi-senpai," she started calling him "Senpai-kun."
He has a fiancée who is in the first grade of elementary school, so he has been ridiculed as a lolicon, but he denies it. He says, "I'm not a lolicon. It's just that my fiancée, whom my parents decided on their own, happens to be six years old." He has been the president of the student council for three consecutive years since his speech as the representative of the new students when he entered the school. He has a beautiful voice, which he admits to himself and others, and is good at not only making speeches but also copying vocal cords. He is the liaison officer for the Detective Boys. He is a soft-spoken honor student.
Michiru Fukuroi (袋井 満, Fukuroi Michiru)
Voiced by: Toshiki Masuda (Japanese); Alejandro Saab (English)
Year 2, class A at Yubiwa Academy Middle School. Also known as "Michiru the Epicure." Mayumi calls him "delinquent."
He is a dangerous person who tops the "ranking of students who should never be involved in the school." He is known as "the bossman" outside of school, but he is also a good cook and has a family-oriented side. He has a habit of using a lot of satirical metaphors.
Hyota Ashikaga (足利 飆太, Ashikaga Hyōta)
Voiced by: Shōgo Yano (Japanese); Caleb Yen (English)
Year 1, class A at Yubiwa Academy Middle School. Ace of the track and field team. Also known as "Hyota the Adonis." Mayumi calls him "Mr. Bare-Legs."
He wears a uniform that has been changed to look like shorts. Ever since he entered the school wearing such a uniform, all the girls who saw it stopped shortening their skirts and started wearing black stockings. He has a well-developed face and is ridiculed for being like the archangel who bosses other angels.
He insists on exposing his legs even in winter. He is a member of the detective squad's physical strength and mobility section. Despite his cute appearance, he often acts carelessly and makes dangerous comments. Has been kidnapped three times in the past. His parents are divorced.
Sosaku Yubiwa (指輪 創作, Yubiwa Sōsaku)
Voiced by: Gen Satō (Japanese); Brian Timothy Anderson (English)
Year 1, class A at Yubiwa Academy Middle School. Also known as "Sosaku the Artiste." Mayumi calls him "Child Genius."
He is the heir to the Yubiwa Foundation, the parent organization of the Yubiwa Academy. He is the de facto president of the Yubiwa Foundation. A child prodigy with both financial and artistic talents. He is a member of the Detective Boys' art team. He is expressionless and of few words, but only Manabu can read his thoughts. Usually, only speaks twice in each book.
Rei (麗)
Voiced by: Hiroki Nanami (Japanese); Amber Lee Connors (English)
The leader of the "Twenties," a group of illegal couriers. Also known as the "Twenty Faces of Beauty."
She is not a good person, but she is a beautiful woman who loves her friends.
Lai Fudatsuki (札槻 嘘, Fudatsuki Rai)
Voiced by: Kohsuke Toriumi (Japanese); Todd Haberkorn (English)
A second-year student at Hairdressing Middle School. Student council president. Charismatic and ambitious.
He runs a casino called "Reasonable Doubt." He is involved with a private weapons company and reports on their products.
He also appears in Mazemonogatari, a collaborative novel with the Monogatari series.

== Media ==
=== Novels ===
The novels are written by Nisio Isin and are illustrated by Kinako. During the development of the story in the Bōkyaku Tantei series, the "Pretty Boy Detective Club" was a group originally intended to appear there, but Nisio Isin decided it could be published as an independent story. The volume titles are homages to novels by Edogawa Ranpo.

Kodansha has published eleven volumes from October 2015 to December 2019 under their Kodansha Taiga imprint. In an interview for the Japanese magazine "Da Vinci," Nisio stated his plans for 2021 and said that he wanted to develop a new story in the series because of the anime adaptation. On March 13, 2021, the new volume titled The Pretty Boy in the Rue Morgue was announced. It was released on May 14, 2021. The novels are licensed in North America by Vertical, which has published three volumes of the series. The English editions were translated by Winifred Bird.

No.	Title	Original release date	English release date
1	Pretty Boy Detective Club: The Dark Star that Shines for You Alone; Bishōnen Tanteidan Kimi Dake ni Hikari Kagayaku Ankokusei (美少年探偵団 きみだけに光かがやく暗黒星)	October 20, 2015; 978-4-06-294001-6	September 29, 2020; 978-1-94-998051-6
2	The Swindler, the Vanishing Man, and the Pretty Boys; Petenshi to Kūki Otoko to Bishōnen (ぺてん師と空気男と美少年)	December 17, 2015; 978-4-06-294011-5	December 29, 2020; 978-1-94-998087-5
3	The Pretty Boy in the Attic; Yaneura no Bishōnen (屋根裏の美少年)	March 17, 2016; 978-4-06-294023-8	April 27, 2021; 978-1-94-998088-2
4	Oshie to Tabisuru Bishōnen (押絵と旅する美少年)	September 21, 2016; 978-4-06-294047-4	—
5	Panoramato Bidan (パノラマ島美談)	October 19, 2016; 978-4-06-294049-8	—
6	Dī-zaka no Bishōnen (D坂の美少年)	March 22, 2017; 978-4-06-294065-8	—
7	Bishōnen Isu (美少年椅子)	October 19, 2017; 978-4-06-294095-5	—
8	Ryokui no Bishōnen (緑衣の美少年)	May 23, 2018; 978-4-06-294122-8	—
9	Bishōnen Emu (美少年M)	October 24, 2018; 978-4-06-513306-4	—
10	Bishōnen Tokage (Hikarihen) (美少年蜥蜴【光編】)	November 22, 2019; 978-4-06-517422-7	—
11	Bishōnen Tokage (Kagehen) (美少年蜥蜴【影編】)	December 20, 2019; 978-4-06-518009-9	—
12	Morugu-gai no Bishōnen (モルグ街の美少年)	May 14, 2021; 978-4-06-523389-4	—

=== Manga ===
A manga adaptation with art by Suzuka Oda, began serialization in Kodansha's shōjo manga magazine Aria in April 2016, and it moved to Kodansha's shōnen manga magazine Shōnen Magazine Edge in October 2018 after Aria ceased publication in April 2018, and continued the publication until July 17, 2019. It was collected in five tankōbon volumes. The manga is licensed in North America by Vertical. The English release is in omnibus 2-in-1 volumes, with four original volumes covered.

No.	Original release date	Original ISBN	English release date	English ISBN
1	September 7, 2016	978-4-06-380874-2	July 27, 2021	978-1-64-729047-4
2	February 7, 2017	978-4-06-380905-3	July 27, 2021	978-1-64-729047-4
3	August 7, 2017	978-4-06-380941-1	December 28, 2021	978-1-64-729076-4
4	June 7, 2018	978-4-06-511826-9	December 28, 2021	978-1-64-729076-4
5	September 6, 2019	978-4-06-517028-1	—	—

=== Anime ===
An anime adaptation was announced on the tenth volume of the novel on November 22, 2019. The television series is under the chief direction of Akiyuki Shinbo, direction of Hajime Ootani, animated by Shaft, produced by Aniplex, featuring character designs adapted for animation by Hiroki Yamamura (Shaft), and music composed by Masatomo Ota and EFFY. Shinbo and Shaft are serving as series script supervisors, and Yukito Kizawa is writing the scripts themselves. Kenjirou Okada is the assistant director; and Yamamura, Akihisa Takano (Shaft), and Sayuri Sakimoto are the chief animation directors. Tsutomu Shibuya (Shaft), Nagisa Sekiguchi (Shaft), and Ryou Komori are the main animators. The series aired from April 11 to June 27, 2021, on ABC and TV Asahi's Animazing!!! programming block. Sumika performed the series' opening theme song "Shake & Shake," while the series' cast Ayumu Murase, Taito Ban, Toshiki Masuda, Shōgo Yano, and Gen Satō performed the ending theme song "Beautiful Reasoning." Aniplex of America licensed the series and streamed it on Funimation.

No.	Title	Directed by (Note: Information is taken from the ending credits of each episode.)	Storyboarded by	Original release date
1	"The Dark Star that Shines for You Alone Part 1"; Transliteration: "Kimi Dake ni Hikari Kagayaku Ankokusei Sono Ichi" (Japanese: きみだけに光かがやく暗黒星 その１)	Kenjirou Okada	Hajime Ootani	April 11, 2021
2	"The Dark Star that Shines for You Alone (Part 2)"; Transliteration: "Kimi Dake ni Hikari Kagayaku Ankokusei Sono Ni" (Japanese: きみだけに光かがやく暗黒星 その2)	Takashi Yasui	Hajime Ootani	April 18, 2021
3	"The Dark Star that Shines for You Alone (Part 3)"; Transliteration: "Kimi Dake ni Hikari Kagayaku Ankokusei Sono San" (Japanese: きみだけに光かがやく暗黒星 その3)	Takashi Asami; Shouhei Fujita	Hajime Ootani	April 25, 2021
4	"The Swindler, the Vanishing Man, and the Pretty Boys (Part 1)"; Transliteration: "Petenshi to Kūki Otoko to Bishōnen Sono Ichi" (Japanese: ぺてん師と空気男と美少年 その１)	Yūji Tokuno	Kenjirou Okada	May 2, 2021
5	"The Swindler, the Vanishing Man, and the Pretty Boys (Part 2)"; Transliteration: "Petenshi to Kūki Otoko to Bishōnen Sono Ni" (Japanese: ぺてん師と空気男と美少年 その２)	Naoaki Shibuta	Mie Ōishi	May 9, 2021
6	"The Pretty Boy in the Attic (Part 1)"; Transliteration: "Yaneura no Bishōnen Sono Ichi" (Japanese: 屋根裏の美少年 その１)	Shouhei Fujita	Takashi Kawabata	May 16, 2021
7	"The Pretty Boy in the Attic (Part 2)"; Transliteration: "Yaneura no Bishōnen Sono Ni" (Japanese: 屋根裏の美少年 その２)	Yūji Tokuno	Takashi Kawabata	May 23, 2021
8	"The Pretty Boy Traveling with the Brocade Portrait (Part 1)"; Transliteration: "Oshie to Tabi Suru Bishōnen Sono Ichi" (Japanese: 押絵と旅する美少年 その１)	Kenjirou Okada	Kenjirou Okada	May 30, 2021
9	"The Pretty Boy Traveling with the Brocade Portrait (Part 2)"; Transliteration: "Oshie to Tabi Suru Bishōnen Sono Ni" (Japanese: 押絵と旅する美少年 その２)	Takashi Yasui	Mie Ōishi	June 6, 2021
10	"The Pretty Boy on D. Hill (Part 1)"; Transliteration: "Dī-zaka no Bishōnen Sono Ichi" (Japanese: D坂の美少年 その１)	Naoaki Shibuta; Shouhei Fujita	Takashi Kawabata	June 13, 2021
11	"The Pretty Boy on D. Hill (Part 2)"; Transliteration: "Dī-zaka no Bishōnen Sono Ni" (Japanese: D坂の美少年 その２)	Takashi Yasui; Yūji Tokuno	Takashi Yasui; Yūji Tokuno	June 20, 2021
12	"The Pretty Boy on D. Hill (Part 3)"; Transliteration: "Dī-zaka no Bishōnen Sono San" (Japanese: D坂の美少年 その３)	Kenjirou Okada; Hajime Ootani	Hajime Ootani	June 27, 2021

== Reception ==
The School Library Journal listed the first volume of Pretty Boy Detective Club as one of the top 10 manga of 2021.

== See also ==
- Psychic Detective Yakumo, a novel series with a manga adaptation illustrated by Suzuka Oda
- Disney Twisted-Wonderland, a mobile game with a manga adaptation written and illustrated by Suzuka Oda
