= Hikaru =

- Pronunciation: Hee-kah-ru
- Gender: unisex

Origin
- Origin: Japanese
- Meaning: Light, Radiance (depending on kanji used)
- Region of origin: Japan

Other names
- Related names: Hikari, Kōki

Hikaru (ひかる, ヒカル) is a Japanese unisex given name meaning "light" or "radiance".

== Written forms ==
Hikaru can be written using different kanji characters and can mean:

- 光, "light"
- 輝, "radiance"

The name can also be written in hiragana or katakana. It is more common for girls named Hikaru to only have hiragana in their name without kanji.

== People with the name ==
- Hikaru (singer) (ヒカル; born 1987), Japanese singer and member of the J-pop group Kalafina
- Hikaru Akao (赤尾 ひかる; born 1995), Japanese voice actress
- Hikaru Aoyama (青山 ひかる; born 1993), Japanese singer
- Hikaru Arai (新井 光; born 1999), Japanese footballer
- Hikaru Asami (ひかる; born 1972), Japanese performing artist and a former member of the Takarazuka Revue
- Hikaru Ezaki (江崎 ひかる; born 2004), Japanese K-pop performer, a member of Kep1er
- Hikaru Fujii (藤井 光; born 1976), Japanese artist
- Hikaru Fujiwara (藤原 光; born 2003), Japanese professional footballer
- Hikaru Hanada (花田 光; born 1958), Japanese voice actor and actor
- Hikaru Hayashi (林 光; 1931–2012), Japanese classical composer, pianist and conductor
- Hikaru Hironiwa (広庭 輝; born 1985), Japanese former soccer player
- Hikaru Ijūin (伊集院 光; born 1967), Japanese comedian, radio personality, computer game reviewer, and commentator
- Hikaru Inoue (井上 光; 1851–1908), Japanese general
- Hikaru Ito (伊藤 光; born 1989), Japanese baseball player
- Hikaru Iwasaki (1923–2016), American-Japanese photographer
- Hikaru Kaihatsu (開發 光; born 1989), known as Hikakin, Japanese YouTuber, human beatboxer and businessman
- Hikaru Kawabata (川畑 輝鎮; born 1965), Japanese professional wrestler
- Hikaru Kawase (川瀬 晃; born 1997), Japanese professional baseball infielder
- Hikaru Kitagawa (北川 ひかる; born 1997), Japanese professional footballer
- Hikaru Kobayashi (小林 ひかる; born 1976), Japanese ballet dancer
- Hikaru Kojima (小島 ひかる; born 1994), Japanese association football player
- Hikaru Kosaka (小坂 光; born 1988), Japanese cyclo-cross and road cyclist
- Hikaru Kotobuki (ことぶき 光; born 1964), Japanese electronic musician
- Hikaru Koyama (小山 ひかる; born 1991), member of Hinoi Team and Love & Peace
- Hikaru Manabe (眞鍋 旭輝; born 1997), Japanese footballer
- Hikaru Matsumoto (松本 ひかる; born 1995), Japanese female handball player
- Hikaru Matsunaga (松永 光; 1928–2022), Japanese politician
- Hikaru Midorikawa (緑川 光; born 1968), Japanese voice actor
- Hikaru Minegishi (嶺岸 光; born 1991), Japanese professional footballer
- Hikaru Mita (三田 光; born 1981), Japanese former football player
- Hikaru Mizuno (水野 輝; born 1991), Japanese footballer
- Hikaru Mori (森 ひかる; born 1999), Japanese trampoline gymnast
- Hikaru Morita (森田 ひかる; born 2001), Japanese performer, a member of Sakurazaka46
- Hikaru Nakahara (中原 輝; born 1996), Japanese footballer
- Hikaru Nakamura (中村 光; born 1987), American chess Grandmaster and streamer
- Hikaru Nakamura (artist) (中村 光; born 1984), Japanese manga artist
- Hikaru Nakao (中尾 輝; born 1994), Japanese professional baseball player
- Hikaru Naomoto (猶本 光; born 1994), Japanese women's footballer
- Hikaru Naruoka (成岡 輝瑠; born 2002), Japanese footballer
- Hikaru Natsumi (菜摘 ひかる; 1973–2002), Japanese writer and sex worker
- Hikaru Nishida (西田 ひかる; born 1972), Japanese J-pop singer and actress
- Hikaru Ōe (大江 光; born 1995), Japanese snowboarder
- Hikaru Ohira (大平 ひかる; born 2002), Japanese former member of the Amefurasshi
- Hikaru Ohsawa (大沢 ひかる; born 1995), Japanese former actress
- Hikaru Ohta (太田 光; born 1996), Japanese professional baseball player
- Hikaru Okuizumi (奥泉 光; born 1956), Japanese novelist
- Hikaru Ono (大野 ひかる; born 1992), Japanese karateka
- Hikaru Ozawa (小澤 光; born 1988), Japanese former football player
- Hikaru Ritsuki (律月 ひかる; born 2001), Japanese member of the Iginari Tohoku San
- Hikaru Saeki (佐伯 光; born 1943), Japanese admiral, the first female star officer of the Japan Self-Defense Forces
- Hikaru Sato (佐藤 光留; born 1980), Japanese professional wrestler and mixed martial artist
- Hikaru Sato (tennis) (佐藤 光; born 1999), Japanese tennis player
- Hikaru Sawai (沢井 比河流; born 1964), Japanese koto player and composer
- Hikaru Shida (志田 光; born 1988), Japanese professional wrestler and actress
- Hikaru Shimizu (清水 光; born 1996), Japanese footballer
- Hikaru Sugii (杉井 光; born 1978), Japanese light novel author
- Hikaru Takahashi (髙橋 ひかる; born 2001), Japanese actress and model
- Hikaru Tamura (田村 熙; born 1993), Japanese rugby union player
- Hikaru Tanaka (田中 光; born 1972), Japanese gymnast
- Hikaru Tomokiyo (友清 光; born 1998), Japanese judoka
- Hikaru Tono (遠野 ひかる; born 1996), Japanese voice actress
- Hikaru Tsuchiya (土屋 光; born 1986), Japanese high jumper
- Hikaru Utada (宇多田 ヒカル; born 1983), Japanese-American singer, songwriter, arranger, and producer
- Hikaru Watanabe (渡邉 ひかる; born 1994), Japanese former member of the Super Girls (Japanese group)
- Hikaru Yamada (山田 光; 1923–2001), Japanese ceramicist
- Hikaru Yamamoto (山本 ひかる; born 1991), Japanese actress
- Hikaru Yamashita (山下 光; born 2000), Japanese ice hockey player
- Hikaru Yamashita (baseball) (山下 輝; born 1999), Japanese professional baseball player
- Hikaru Yaotome (八乙女 光; born 1990), Japanese singer, actor, songwriter, dancer, and member of Hey! Say! JUMP
- Hikaru Yumura (祐村 ひかる; born 1997), Japanese professional footballer
- Miracle Hikaru (ミラクルひかる; born 1980), Japanese impressionist of the comedic
- Morgan Hikaru Aiken (モーガン・ヒカル・エイケン; born 1994), Japanese-American former professional basketball player

== Fictional characters ==
- Hikaru (ヒカル), a character in Angelic Layer
- Hikaru (Jimmy) (ヒカル), a character in Ape Escape 2
- Hikaru (光), a character in Exo-Force
- Hikaru (ひかる), a character in Parodius
- Hikaru (ヒカル), a character in Princess Ai
- Hikaru (ヒカル), a character in Seijuu Sentai Gingaman
- Hikaru Amano (ヒカル), a character in Martian Successor Nadesico
- Hikaru Genji (光源氏), a character in The Tale of Genji
- Hikaru Gosunkugi (光), a character in Ranma ½
- Hikaru Hasama (光), a character in Beyblade: Metal Fusion
- Hikaru Hibino (ひかる), a character in Hime-chan no Ribbon
- Hikaru Hoshihara (ヒカル), a character in Little Battlers Experience WARS
- Hikaru Hoshina (ひかる), also known as Cure Star, the protagonist of Star Twinkle PreCure
- Hikaru Hoshino (光), a character in Time Patrol Tai Otasukeman
- Hikaru Hitachiin (光), a character in Ouran High School Host Club
- Hikaru Hiyama (ひかる), a character in Kimagure Orange Road
- Hikaru Ichijyo (輝), a character in Macross
- Hikaru Ichinomiya (ひかる), a character in Shugo Chara!, aka Gozen
- Hikaru Indo (忌堂 光), a main character in The Summer Hikaru Died
- Hikaru Jo (光), a character in Kamen Rider Blade, the human disguise of the Tiger Undead
- Hikaru Kamiki (カミキヒカル), the main antagonist in manga and anime series Oshi no Ko
- Hikaru Katsuragi (ひかる), a character in Choudenshi Bioman
- Hikaru Koizumi (小泉光るなら), a main character in Ani-Imo
- Hikaru Kosaka (ひかる), a character in The Brave Fighter of Legend Da-Garn
- Hikaru Makiba (ひかる), a character in Grendizer
- Hikaru Matsuyama (光), a character in Captain Tsubasa
- Hikaru Mizuki (ひかる), a character in Kirarin Revolution
- Hikaru Nagomi (ひかる), a character in Delicious Party Pretty Cure
- Hikaru Nanjou (光), a character in The Idolmaster Cinderella Girls
- Hikaru Narita (輝), a character in Hot Gimmick
- Hikaru Raido (ヒカル), a character in Ultraman Ginga
- Hikaru Shidou (光), a character in Magic Knight Rayearth
- Hikaru Shindou (ヒカル), a character in Hikaru no Go
- Hikaru Shinjou (ひかる), a character in the Gyakuten Saiban manga
- Hikaru Sorano (ひかる), a character in Codename wa Sailor V
- Hikaru Sulu, a character in Star Trek
- Thunder Warrior Hikaru of Seijuu Sentai Gingaman
- Hikaru Usada (ヒカル), a character in Di Gi Charat
- Minamoto no Hikaru (光), the main character within Otogizōshi
- Sungel/Sunjiel (aka MagiShine), of Mahou Sentai Magiranger (often referred to as "Hikaru-sensei")
- The Figure Hikaru of Figure 17

== Other uses ==
- Sega Hikaru, an arcade game platform
- Sony Ericsson W995, previously known as Hikaru
