= Kamijo =

Kamijo or Kamijō may refer to:

- Kamijo (musician) - Japanese singer
- Akimine Kamijo - Japanese manga artist
- Atsushi Kamijo - Japanese manga artist
- Chihiro Kamijo - Japanese musician and drummer of the rock band 9mm Parabellum Bullet
- Kamijō Station (Nagano) - train station in Nagano
- Kamijō Station (Niigata) - train station in Niigata
- Hikari Kamijo - a fictional character in the manga series Hikari no Densetsu
- Tōma Kamijō - a fictional character in the novel series A Certain Magical Index
- Mutsuki Kamijō - a fictional character in the television show Kamen Rider Blade

== See also ==
- Kamijō Station (disambiguation)
