= Hikari (name) =

- Gender: Unisex
- Language: Japanese

Origin
- Meaning: "Light"

Other names
- Alternative spelling: Hikaru
- Related names: Nur (name)

Hikari (ひかり, ヒカリ, 光) is a Japanese unisex name. Notable people with the name include:

- Hikari Agata (干刈 あがた; 1943–1992), Japanese novelist and translator
- Hikari Endō (遠藤 光莉; born 1999), Japanese idol of the idol group Sakurazaka46
- Hikari Hirata (平田 ひかり; born 1995), Japanese professional footballer
- Hikari Ishida (石田 ひかり; born 1972), Japanese actress
- Hikari Kajiwara (梶原 ひかり; born 1992), Japanese actress
- Hikari Kodama (小玉 ひかり; born 2000), Japanese singer and voice actress
- Hikari Minami (みなみ 飛香; born 1994), Japanese professional wrestler
- Hikari Mitsushima (満島 ひかり; born 1985), Japanese actress
- Hikari Mori (森 星; born 1992), Japanese model, actress, television host, and designer
- Hikari Nagashima (長嶋 洸; born 1993), Japanese professional footballer
- Hikari Nakade (中出 ひかり; born 1988), Japanese football player
- Hikari Noa (乃蒼 ヒカリ; born 1998), Japanese professional wrestler
- Hikari Ōe (大江 光; born 1963), Japanese composer
- Hikari Okubo (大久保 光; born 1993), Japanese motorcycle racer
- Hikari Ōta (太田 光; born 1965), Japanese television comedian
- Hikari Senga (born 1999), Japanese voice actress
- Hikari Senju, Japanese-American entrepreneur, founder and CEO
- Hikari Shiina (椎名 ひかり; born 1994), Japanese model, singer, and television personality
- Hikari Shimizu (清水 ひかり; born 1993), Japanese professional wrestler
- Hikari Tachibana (橘 ひかり; born 1973), Japanese voice actress
- Hikari Takagi (高木 ひかり; born 1993), Japanese women's footballer
- Hikari Yamada (山田 光; born 1967), Japanese judoka

== Fictional characters ==
- Hikari Sakishima, a character in Nagi-Asu: A Lull in the Sea
- Hikari (Pokémon) (ヒカリ) or Dawn, Pokémon characters
- Hikari Asahina (樋香里), a minor character in Magical Girl Pretty Sammy
- Hikari Kamijo (洞木 ヒカリ), the main character in the anime series Hikari no Densetsu (lit. Legend of Light)
- Hikari Horaki, a character in Neon Genesis Evangelion
- Hikari Yagami/Kari Kamiya (八神 ヒカリ), a character in Digimon Adventure, Digimon Adventure 02 and Digimon Adventure Tri
- Hikari, a character in This Ugly Yet Beautiful World
- Hikari Hayashi, a character in the manga Full Moon o Sagashite
- Hikari Konohana, a character in the anime Strawberry Panic!
- Hikari Kuroda, a character in School Days
- Lan Hikari (Netto Hikari), Yuichiro Hikari, and Haruka Hikari, characters in the Mega Man Battle Network and MegaMan NT Warrior series
- Satoshi Hikari and Rio Hikari, characters in D.N.Angel
- Ultraman Hikari, a character in Ultraman Mebius
- Hikari Kujou, a character in Futari wa Pretty Cure
- Hikari Hanazono, a character in S · A: Special A
- Natsumi Hikari, a character in Kamen Rider Decade
- Hikari, a character in Haibane Renmei
- Hikari Nonomura, a character in Ressha Sentai ToQger
- Hikari Madoka, a character in Ultraman
- Hikari, a character in Arcaea
- Hikari Takanashi, a character in Interviews with Monster Girls
- Hikari Kagura, a character in the Revue Starlight franchise
- Hikari Ku, a character in Octopath Traveler 2
- Hikari Chono, one of the three main characters in the anime Kamisama Minarai: Himitsu no Cocotama
- Hikari (ヒカリ ) or Mythra, a character in the video game Xenoblade Chronicles 2
- Hikari Sanehara, a character in Photo Kano
- Hikari Tsuneki, a character in Seiren

== See also ==
- Hikaru
