= List of Arakawa Under the Bridge episodes =

Arakawa Under the Bridge (荒川アンダー ザ ブリッジ, Arakawa Andā za Burijji) is an anime adaptation of the manga of the same name which was written by Hikaru Nakamura. The anime adaptation was announced in August 2009, and aired on TV Tokyo between April 4, 2010, and June 28, 2010. A second season, titled Arakawa Under the Bridge *2 (荒川アンダー ザ ブリッジ*2, Arakawa Andā za Burijji x Burijji), aired in Japan between October 3, 2010, and December 26, 2010.

The first season was directed by Yukihiro Miyamoto and Akiyuki Shinbo, with series composition and screenplay written by Deko Akao, music composed by Masaru Yokoyama, and characters designed by Nobuhiro Sugiyama (Shaft). Sugiyama served as chief animation director for all of the episodes. About half of the series was co-produced with Diomedéa: episodes 2, 4, 6, 8, 11, and 13, which also had Kazuhisa Kosuge as a second chief animation director alongside Sugiyama. (Note: Diomedéa is credited as Animation Assistance (アニメーション協力) for these episodes; and Makoto Kohara, the president of the studio and a former animator at Shaft, is credited as a line producer for their episodes.) Five episodes were outsourced otherwise: episodes 3, 7, and 10 to Silver Link; episode 5 to Marvy Jack; and episode 8 to Studio Pastoral. (Note: Outsourcing studios credited as Assisting Production (協力プロダクション) on their respective episodes.) The first season has three theme songs, two opening themes and one ending theme.. The main opening theme is "Venus & Jesus" (ヴィーナスとジーザス, Vīnasu to Jīzasu) by Etsuko Yakushimaru and its ending theme "Upside-down Bridge" (逆様ブリッジ, Sakasama Burijji) by Suneohair, which is also the ending theme for episode 13 of the second season. The opening theme was released as a single on May 26, 2010, and the ending theme on June 23, 2010. The opening theme for episode five is "Think up a title yourself" (タイトルなんて自分で考えなさいな, Taitoru Nante Jibun de Kangaenasai na) performed by Miyuki Sawashiro.

The second season features returning staff. However, Diomedéa is replaced as a partial co-producer by Marvy Jack in episodes 2, 4, 6, 8–9, and 12. Kosuge is also replaced as a second chief animation director by Kazuhiko Tamura. Seven episodes were outsourced otherwise: episodes 2 and 7 Diomedéa; episode 3 to White Fox; episodes 4, 7, and 11 to Tezuka Productions; and episode 8 to Magic Bus. The second season has three theme songs, two opening themes and one ending theme. The main opening theme is "Cosmos vs. Alien" by Yakushimaru while the ending theme is "Red Coat" (赤いコート, Akai Kōto) by Suneohair. The opening theme for episode 10 is "Kou-sama☆GO! Summer!! ~Well, Let's go to Venus~ (行様☆GO!Summer!!〜いや、行くのは金星だから〜, Kō-sama☆GO! Summer!! ~ Iya, Iku noha Kinsei Dakara ~) by Chō.

== Arakawa Under the Bridge ==
No.	Title	Directed by (Note: Information is taken from the ending credits of each episode.)	Storyboarded by	Original release date
1	"1 Bridge"; Transliteration: "Ichi Burijji" (Japanese: 1 ブリッジ)	Yukihiro Miyamoto	Shinichi Omata	April 4, 2010
Kou Ichinomiya has always held up his family's tradition of never being indebted to anyone. While trying to retrieve his pants from a bridge pillar, they fall, dragging him down into the river, where he is saved by a strange girl named Nino. Suffering from an asthma attack induced by being indebted to Nino, he accepts the only way he can pay her back; by falling in love with her. In keeping with this promise, Kou feels obligated to live with her under the bridge. After a cold night sleeping in 'the villa', Nino takes Kou to the Village Mayor, a strange man dressed in a kappa suit, who gives him the name Recruit. Kou soon finds that Nino's room is a lot better than the villa, although he is quick to notice Nino's bizarre sleeping habits.
2	"2 Bridge"; Transliteration: "Ni Burijji" (Japanese: 2 ブリッジ)	Shinichi Omata	Shinichi Omata	April 11, 2010
Realizing he is now spending time with a girl for the first time in his life, Kou has trouble coming up with a conversation to have with Nino. After taking a bath in an oil drum, Kou is introduced to some of the other strange residents of Arakawa, but makes a bad first impression when he reveals himself as Nino's lover. They then attend mass held by a trigger-happy man dressed in a nun's outfit, named Sister.
3	"3 Bridge"; Transliteration: "San Burijji" (Japanese: 3 ブリッジ)	Toshinori Narita	Toshinori Narita	April 18, 2010
A man with a star-shaped head named Hoshi spots Nino leaving Kou's room, and drags Kou into a confessional where he has Sister act as a lie detector. Kou reveals he has yet to go on a date with Nino, and Hoshi's jeers prompts Kou to ask her out on a date. However, Nino doesn't really understand what a date is. She eventually decides to go to the mouth of the river to see if the grass boats she had been making have reached the sea.
4	"4 Bridge"; Transliteration: "Yon Burijji" (Japanese: 4 ブリッジ)	Susumu Endou	Shinichi Omata; Toshinori Narita; Hisatoshi Shimizu; Yoshihiro Mori	April 25, 2010
Kou and Nino go on their first date. Facing a three-hour walk to the mouth of the river, Kou tries to come up with ways to stop Nino becoming bored. They eventually spot one of Nino's grass ships trapped on a signpost, so Kou goes into the river in order to free it. Back at the bridge, the residents are introduced to Stella, a girl from an English orphanage Sister used to run. Kou is asked to look after her while Sister contacts her country. However, it is soon revealed that Stella is a powerful fighter, who beats Kou in a fight. Kou and Sister later get some ingredients from a farm, run by another strange woman named Maria who casually insults people. Sister seems unaffected by the insults until he is told he is boring and collapses.
5	"5 Bridge"; Transliteration: "Go Burijji" (Japanese: 5 ブリッジ)	Nobukage Kimura	Shinichi Omata	May 2, 2010
After carting a bleeding Sister back from their visit to Maria, Kou gets some vegetables from an extremely clumsy girl named P-ko. Later, they have a welcome party for Stella where it becomes apparent Kou has not yet secured a job in the village. At odds with Hoshi, the two decide to have a musical battle.
6	"6 Bridge"; Transliteration: "Roku Burijji" (Japanese: 6 ブリッジ)	Yoshito Mikamo	Toshimasa Suzuki	May 9, 2010
Kou and Hoshi hold their musical battle, with Kou's violin managing to win against Hoshi's guitar. The song Hoshi makes after snapping at the defeat ends up being a hit, though. Later, Kou teaches the Metal Brothers how to swim, which is troublesome due to their heavy masks. Noticing the good job he's doing, Nino suggests that Kou should become a teacher. The Village Chief and Metal Brothers suggest the same thing, although they generally ignored everything he teaches them. Intrigued by the idea of instilling common sense into the Arakawa citizens, Kou accepts the job as a teacher.
7	"7 Bridge"; Transliteration: "Nana Burijji" (Japanese: 7 ブリッジ)	Yuusuke Kamata	Yoshihiro Mori	May 16, 2010
Kou starts his class, but only Nino and the Metal Brothers are currently in attendance. After a rough start, Kou starts teaching them about science, but his class in interrupted by the destructive nature of Stella. However, Kou eventually manages to calm her down with some projects. Later, Kou gets a bit worried over the thought of P-ko getting a driver's license. After she persuades the Village Chief to get a new 'haircut', she worries that the other girls may fall for him, revealing she is in love with him as well. As Kou wonders just 'what is common sense', he is spotted by some of his subordinates from his company.
8	"8 Bridge"; Transliteration: "Hachi Burijji" (Japanese: 8 ブリッジ)	Yoshihiro Mori (Note: TV Version); Susumu Endou (Note: BD Version)	Kiyoko Sayama	May 23, 2010
Kou is visited by employees from one of his companies, Takai and Shimazaki. Wanting to appear normal in their eyes, Kou asks the other residents to pretend to be employees for a supposed company that produces power from under the bridge. When Nino refuses to play the part of a secretary, Takai becomes jealous at her announcement of being Kou's lover (expressing it in a way that creeps out even the Arakawa residents). He later ends up staying at Kou's place. Takai and Hoshi start pressuring the authenticity of Kou and Nino's relationship status, but Nino surprises everyone, especially Kou, when she kisses him. Upon seeing this, Takai becomes relieved and takes his leave while Hoshi jumps into the river from a state of shock and declares himself a starfish. However, Shimazaki presents her findings to Kou's father, Seki, who vows not to let Kou drag the family name in the mud.
9	"9 Bridge"; Transliteration: "Kyū Burijji" (Japanese: 9 ブリッジ)	Tomoyuki Itamura	Tomoyuki Itamura	May 30, 2010
Hoshi is still depressed after seeing Nino kiss Kou, and ends up getting dragged around by Stella who wants to cook something for Sister. Kou becomes concerned over how Stella would react if she learned of Sister's attraction to Maria, which soon becomes apparent when Hoshi blabs about it. Stella becomes furious and vows revenge on Maria. The two eventually face off, but Stella is overwhelmed by Maria's speed and skill, though the two end up becoming friends. The next day, Hoshi tells Kou about his past life as a famous musician, how he met Nino and how he came to wear a star mask, though Kou doubts the legitimacy of his story.
10	"10 Bridge"; Transliteration: "Jū Burijji" (Japanese: 10 ブリッジ)	Susumu Endou (Note: TV Version); Shinichi Omata (Note: BD Version)	Toshinori Narita	June 7, 2010
Kou's peaceful summer day is interrupted by a fire drill featuring a real fire. As the residents way of handling a fire shows its weirdness, Kou wonders why Sister spoils the Village Chief so much despite how much of an idiot he is. Meanwhile, Shimazaki continues supplying Seki with reports on Kou, and the next day Kou learns from his workers that Seki had bought up the land under the bridge for development. Kou tries to warn the Chief and Sister, but they don't take it seriously. The next day, Kou receives a notice from an MLIT official asking for everyone to leave the riverbank, which the other residents take badly.
11	"11 Bridge"; Transliteration: "Jū Ichi Burijji" (Japanese: 11 ブリッジ)	Shinichi Omata	Shinichi Omata; Yoshihiro Mori; Kiyoko Sayama	June 14, 2010
Kou considers leaving for the sake of the others, but Nino convinces him to stay. Kou decides to use one of his companies to compete with Seki for the rights to the bridge. Meanwhile, one of Seki's workers is mistaken for Kou and gets knocked unconscious by Stella. Kou's plans hit a stumbling block when his contractors learn he's going against his father and pull out. Kou decides to call Seki himself, but ends up calling a talking clock instead.
12	"12 Bridge"; Transliteration: "Jū Ni Burijji" (Japanese: 12 ブリッジ)	Nobukage Kimura	Shinji Satou	June 21, 2010
With Kou too afraid to call his father, Maria comes up with the idea of kicking both him and Hoshi off the bridge so that Nino can make a wish to some shooting stars. At the same time, Seki gets word that the project has been stopped and decides to head for the bridge himself. Upon arriving, he finds himself in a similar situation to Kou's, with his pants stolen and placed at the top of the bridge. He runs into Nino, who tells him all about how Kou has changed for the better. Kou eventually calls Seki's phone, which is in his trousers that he refuses to take back from Nino. As Seki leaves and Nino answers the phone, she hears Kou's words of staying with her forever.
13	"13 Bridge"; Transliteration: "Jū San Burijji" (Japanese: 13 ブリッジ)	Yoshito Mikamo	Shinichi Omata; Satoshi Kuwabara	June 28, 2010
Everyone goes to the Arakawa barbershop, run by a samurai conveniently known as Last Samurai. Kou is a bit worried about what he might do to his hair, though becomes surprised when he finishes everyone's cuts in no time, though it's a different story when Last Samurai tries to cut Sister's hair. Kou then comes across Billy and Jacqueline, a man with a parrot's head and a girl dressed as a bee, though decides not to get near them. Trying to get a compromise between the wishes of Stella and the Metal Brothers, Kou decides to build an amusement park under the bridge, though has never been to one himself. After not being able to come up with anything after three days, the other residents build one themselves. However, it soon becomes apparent that this is one strange amusement park filled with dangerous attractions. Upon hearing the approval of the kids, Kou remembers going to a park with Seki.

== Arakawa Under the Bridge x Bridge ==
No.	Title	Directed by	Storyboarded by	Original release date
1	"1 Bridge X 2"; Transliteration: "Ichi Burijji Burijji" (Japanese: 1 ブリッジ*2)	Yukihiro Miyamoto	Kiyoko Sayama	October 3, 2010
Nino keeps having the same recurring dream involving her parents flying away on a spaceship. Noticing Nino's habit of sleepwalking into his apartment, Kou suggests she move in with him. However Nino misunderstands the concept and they end up trading rooms instead. When checking out Nino's room, Kou finds a high-quality children's dress, and begins to wonder about Nino's past. While traveling upstream to find a wayward baseball, Kou ends up in the Saitama district and runs into a strange Amazon warrior. Later, the men all engage in a marathon. While Shiro is the prohibitive favorite, he runs back before crossing the finish line when he runs out of white powder. With Hoshi and Kou running neck-and-neck at the end, Shiro makes a miraculous return to win the race.
2	"2 Bridge X 2"; Transliteration: "Ni Burijji Burijji" (Japanese: 2 ブリッジ*2)	Shinichi Omata	Chiaki Kon	October 10, 2010
Kou argues with the Amazon Warrior, who is more or less a Saitama stereotype with an obsession for snacks. He is soon knocked out and returned to Arakawa. Later, the gang encounters a strange man who believes himself to be Captain of the Earth Defense Force hoping to fight the Venusians. After a failed attempt by Kou to scare him off, Nino ends up doing so with an overly warm welcome.
3	"3 Bridge X 2"; Transliteration: "San Burijji Burijji" (Japanese: 3 ブリッジ*2)	Chisato Shimura (Note: The pseudonym of an unknown director.)	Kiyoko Sayama	October 17, 2010
While cleaning his room, Kou finds a cassette player belonging to Nino containing messages for a supposed Venusian. When Nino spots this, she becomes angry at him and climbs on top of a telephone pole and refuses to come down. She eventually comes down when Kou offers to listen to the tapes, only to find Hoshi had recorded over them. As an apology, Kou makes a tape of his embarrassing secrets for Nino to listen to. Nino mentions that she was afraid of telling him her secrets in case she'd lose him.
4	"4 Bridge X 2"; Transliteration: "Yon Burijji Burijji" (Japanese: 4 ブリッジ*2)	Susumu Endou	Tomoyuki Itamura	October 24, 2010
P-ko writes a script for a movie and gets Kou to be the director. However, he gets a bit overwhelmed by the various casting choices, none of whom have read the script properly, and everyone is stunned by the editing done by Takai. Later, the gang holds a haunted house which Kou is escorted through, with Hoshi hoping to scare him in front of Nino.
5	"5 Bridge X 2"; Transliteration: "Go Burijji Burijji" (Japanese: 5 ブリッジ*2)	Takashi Kawabata	Shinichi Omata; Yuji Moriyama	October 31, 2010
The self-proclaimed Captain starts living in the riverbank after giving the Mayor and the gang manga with them as main characters and revealing that he is a well-known manga artist. When his editor shows up, it's revealed that he had run away because he wished to draw sci-fi manga but was instead being forced to draw moe manga. The editor agrees to let him draw whatever he wants and they leave. Later, Billy and Jacqueline get together for their anniversary and Kou finds out they had previously been both members of a yakuza group.
6	"6 Bridge X 2"; Transliteration: "Roku Burijji Burijji" (Japanese: 6 ブリッジ*2)	Takahiro Majima	Satoshi Kuwabara	November 7, 2010
Under Seki's orders, Shimazaki researches about Nino, but she is threatened by a strange man not to go any further. Meanwhile, Nino reportedly receives a tape from her parents and tells Kou she has to leave the riverbank and return to Venus, asking him to come with her. To Kou's surprise, everyone else starts inviting themselves to come along.
7	"7 Bridge X 2"; Transliteration: "Nana Burijji Burijji" (Japanese: 7 ブリッジ*2)	Fujiaki Asari	Toshinori Narita	November 14, 2010
The Arakawa residents decide to do a physical checkup to prepare for their trip to Venus, and Kou and Hoshi end up trying to 'outsick' each other to get Nino's attention. Later, the girls spend a week in Sister's basement, though after six days everyone drops out except Nino. When it's the boys turn, Kou tries using P-ko's logbook to strike up a conversation, with embarrassing results.
8	"8 Bridge X 2"; Transliteration: "Hachi Burijji Burijji" (Japanese: 8 ブリッジ*2)	Kazuo Nogami	Kiyoko Sayama	November 21, 2010
Amazoness appears at the riverbank and becomes one of Kou's students, revealing she has a crush on him. She has her Tengu henchmen hypnotize Kou to become attracted to her, manipulating him to the point where they get married. Nino competes with Amazoness to prove how much she loves Kou. Despite the chance he would otherwise have, Hoshi decides to stop the Tengu's hypnosis, while Kou's true feelings break him out of his hypnosis.
9	"9 Bridge X 2"; Transliteration: "Kyū Burijji Burijji" (Japanese: 9 ブリッジ*2)	Shinichi Omata	Shinichi Omata	November 28, 2010
A package arrives for Shiro, and Kou is charged with delivering it. Kou realizes it's from Shiro's wife and assumes it's their divorce papers, but is surprised to find that his wife accepts their long-distance relationship. Later, P-ko prepares a tea party for all the riverbed residents. However, Last Samurai and Chief head off to have their own tea party, dedicated to wabisabi. Kou and Hoshi go with them as well, and end up talking like they know more about it than they really do.
10	"10 Bridge X 2"; Transliteration: "Jū Burijji Burijji" (Japanese: 10 ブリッジ*2)	Chisato Shimura	Kiyoko Sayama	December 5, 2010
With an apparent 500kg weight limit for the rocket to Venus, everyone goes on a diet so they can all go together. While Kou and the Mayor lose weight at a spa, the girls suffer through a strawberry only diet while the others have survival training with Sister. As a result of Sister's training, one of the Metal Brothers, Tetsuo, gains powerful muscles, and he soon confronts Stella to see who is more powerful. In order to stop their fighting, his brother Tetsuro builds up his muscles and manages to stop Tetsuo by showing a stronger love for his muscles.
11	"11 Bridge X 2"; Transliteration: "Jū Ichi Burijji Burijji" (Japanese: 11 ブリッジ*2)	Masahiro Mukai	Satoshi Nishimura	December 12, 2010
As the Arakawa residents hold a Bon Festival, Hoshi and Amazoness team up to try to split up Kou and Nino. In the end though, Amazoness ends up falling for Hoshi, but can't bring herself to confess her feelings. She sets up a beach shack up stream, where she arranges to be rescued by Hoshi so she can confess her feelings, giving him a good luck charm.
12	"12 Bridge X 2"; Transliteration: "Jū Ni Burijji Burijji" (Japanese: 12 ブリッジ*2)	Fujiaki Asari	Kiyoko Sayama	December 19, 2010
The Mayor decides to hold a tournament to see who is strongest on the riverbank. The winner will be granted one wish, something the rest of the members must help make come true. In the first round, the weaker candidates fight in a battle royale, which P-ko ends up winning. She then faces the stronger candidates in a balloon popping match. Both P-ko and the Mayor pop each other's balloons at the same time, and both lose. Two candidates now remain for the title of King, Maria and Sister.
13	"13 Bridge X 2"; Transliteration: "Jū San Burijji Burijji" (Japanese: 13 ブリッジ*2)	Takashi Kawabata	Takahiro Ikezoe	December 26, 2010
Although Sister puts up a valiant defense against Maria's physical attacks, her insults help her win. Although her royal decree turns out to be to make the residents make clothes for her sheered sheep, she forces Kou, Hoshi, Sister and Last Samurai to be sheepdogs. Afterwards, the residents send their wishes down the river. When Nino's wish for everyone to be together forever gets stuck in the middle of the river, Kou paddles out and frees it for her, reassuring her of that promise.
