= Saint Young Men =

Japanese manga series by Hikaru Nakamura

- First tankōbon volume cover

聖☆おにいさん (Seinto Oniisan)
- Genre: Comedy; Slice of life
- Manga
- Written by: Hikaru Nakamura
- Published by: Kodansha
- English publisher: NA: Kodansha USA
- Magazine: Morning Two
- Original run: September 22, 2006 – present
- Volumes: 23
- Original animation DVD
- Directed by: Noriko Takao
- Produced by: Hideharu Gomi; Reo Kurosu
- Written by: Rika Nezu
- Music by: Keiichi Suzuki; Ryōmei Shirai
- Studio: A-1 Pictures
- Released: December 3, 2012 – August 23, 2013
- Runtime: 15–26 minutes
- Episodes: 2
- Anime film
- Directed by: Mamoru Kanbe (Chief); Noriko Takao
- Produced by: Tomonori Ochikoshi; Masayuki Haryu; Yoshihiro Furusawa; Reo Kurosu; Akiko Yodo; Genki Kawamura; Hideharu Gomi
- Written by: Rika Nezu
- Music by: Keiichi Suzuki; Ryōmei Shirai
- Studio: A-1 Pictures
- Released: May 10, 2013
- Runtime: 90 minutes
- icon

Saint Young Men (Japanese: 聖(セイント)☆おにいさん, Hepburn: Seinto Oniisan) is a Japanese manga series written and illustrated by Hikaru Nakamura. Its plot involves Jesus Christ and Gautama Buddha, who are living as roommates in an apartment in Tokyo. It has been serialized by Kodansha in the monthly seinen manga magazine Morning Two since September 2006, with chapters collected in twenty-three tankōbon volumes as of November 2026. Kodansha USA has been publishing the series in English in an omnibus edition since December 2019. A-1 Pictures adapted the manga series into two original animation DVDs (OADs) and an anime film which was released on May 10, 2013. It also inspired a ten-episode live-action web series in 2018.

In Japan, the Saint Young Men manga has sold over 16 million copies. Individual volumes of the series have frequently appeared on lists of the weekly and annual best-seller manga in Japan. It received a Tezuka Osamu Cultural Prize in 2009 and was nominated for a Manga Taishō Award in the same year. It was also nominated for Best Comic at the 2012 Angoulême International Comics Festival. Its film adaptation has been well received by the Japanese public.

== Overview ==
Jesus Christ (イエス・キリスト, Iesu Kirisuto; voiced by Mirai Moriyama in the anime) and Gautama Buddha (ゴータマ・ブッダ, Gōtama Budda; voiced by Gen Hoshino in the anime), the central figures of Christianity and Buddhism respectively, are living together as roommates in an apartment in Tachikawa, part of the suburbs of Tokyo. While taking a vacation on Earth, they attempt to hide their identities and understand modern Japanese society. Each chapter shows their lives during an average day, when they are sightseeing, drinking beer, blogging, or playing video games.

While Jesus is portrayed as an impassioned person for his love for all (even for shopping), Buddha tends to be calm and thrifty, and also likes manga, especially Osamu Tezuka's Buddha. The comedy often involves visual gags and puns, as well as jokes in reference to elements of Christianity and Buddhism; for example, Jesus creates wine from water in a public bath and Buddha shines when excited.

== Characters ==
- Jesus Christ - or Jesus Sei, one of the duo who descended to experience living in Japan. He is the younger half, the energetic and curious. He wears His crown of thorns during his vacation on Earth which blooms whenever He is happy. He gets His stigmata bleeding whenever He's in stress. He maintains His personal blog whenever He's doing nothing.
- Buddha - or Siddhartha Gautama Buddha or in this manga, Buddha Sei, the other half of the duo. He is the mature, quite calm and slow to anger half. He has a running gag of his forehead being poked by children (in the anime), and his hair darkens the background whenever he unfurls it. He has t-shirt printing as his hobby, which makes up the majority of the shirts they wear. He also loves the part autobiographical retelling of his life made by the mangaka Osamu Tezuka, to the point of buying it whenever he could.
- Matsuda - the elderly landlady of the duo's apartment. She didn't know the truth about the duo being holy beings.
- Ryuji - a man who has connections to Yakuza. Mistakenly identified Jesus as a fellow Yakuza member. Has a wife named Shizuko and a daughter named Aiko.
- Brahma - the deity that tasked Buddha to spread his teachings. In this manga, he is in charge of distributing guides to the ones going to Heaven.
- Ananda - one of Buddha's disciples, half-brother to Devadatta. He's hiding his face so that women won't fall for him, and acts as Buddha's accountant.
- Archangel Uriel - one of four Guardian Angels, in charge of destruction. He's very serious and the straight man of the quartet.
- Archangel Michael - one of the four Guardian Angels. Lucifer's younger brother.
- Archangel Raphael - another of the four Guardian Angels. Healer of the group. He works as a tour guide and tour organiser.
- Archangel Gabriel - the most energetic of the quartet.
- Mara - the demon who tempts Buddha during his time finding enlightenment. Still pestering him.
- Devadatta - Ananda's half-brother, Buddha's former disciple turned rival.
- Saint Peter - one of Jesus's disciples and game buddies. Goes by Petey on the game. Guards the pearly gates with Andrew as a job.
- Lucifer - a fallen angel, and in this manga, Michael's older brother. He has a tsuntsun personality.
- Sariputra - one of Buddha's disciples.
- Rahula - Buddha's son and one of his disciples. His running gag involves him staying on toilets and outhouses.
- Andrew - Peter's brother and one of Jesus's disciples.
- Judas Iscariot - another of Jesus's disciples, has a gloomy, pessimistic and self-deprecating personality, and tries his best to distance himself from Jesus due to his guilt of betraying his Lord.
- Kūkai - a junior monk.
- James the Greater - one of Jesus's disciples. He and his younger brother John joined a team that plays Zennis.
- John - one of Jesus's disciples and the disciple whom Jesus beloved. He and his brother James the Greater joined in a team that plays Zennis. He loves to emphasize that he's the one Jesus beloved.
- Suddhodana - Buddha's father. A rice lover, he is critical whenever it comes about rice, which Kapilavastu was known for before.
- Maya - Buddha's mother. Had a tendency to stress buy luxury items when stressed.
- Joseph - Jesus's father while He's on land, and Mary's husband. A well-known carpenter, and so-called patron saint of the carpenters.
- Mary - Jesus's mother. A lovely lady who is also youthful despite her age. She likes the wine her Son made, and knows the brand depending on His jokes.
- Taishakuten - Brahma's partner in encouraging Buddha to reach enlightenment.
- Benzaiten - another Deva. She was known to be a rockstar.
- Thomas - He embodies his doubtful nature.
- Beelzebub - the lord of the flies.

== Production ==
Before writing Saint Young Men, Hikaru Nakamura was working on Arakawa Under the Bridge, which began serialization on December 3, 2004, in the first issue of Square Enix's manga magazine Young Gangan. It attracted the attention of an editor of the magazine Weekly Morning, who wanted Nakamura to publish a series for the magazine. She accepted the offer because of her admiration for Kaiji Kawaguchi's works, such as Zipang and The Silent Service, that were serialized in Weekly Morning. The series' title is derived from a song by Denki Groove and Scha Dara Parr called "Saint Ojisan" (聖☆おじさん, Seinto Ojisan; literally "Saint Old Man"). Starting from sketches of two friends wearing casual shirts, she conceived the idea of portraying Jesus and Buddha as average people.

Nakamura envisioned a comedy manga in which the protagonist would be a "very very powerful character", and realized a divine character would fit this premise. She first planned Jesus to be a character in the series, but to make the gags work well, Buddha was added to the series. Their opposing personalities were inspired by Nakamura's sister and her sister's husband; by observing their relationship, she saw some amusing situations. She also saw a resemblance between her version of Buddha and Osamu Tezuka's version.

Despite the religious references in the series, Nakamura stated she used only her personal knowledge and some aspects of modern society, such as yakuza and blogging, which were not intended to be critical but were added because they fit the story. Similarly, secondary characters were only introduced in the series if a chapter needed a new character to introduce a topic. The themes of the chapters were created before the situations and jokes. However, if Nakamura had a specific theme, she created several jokes and then connected them to form a story. When creating a simpler chapter as compared to the more elaborate, thematic ones, she wrote without worrying about creating jokes and situations in advance. With the help of her four assistants, on average she took between ten days and two weeks to make a complete chapter.

== Media ==
=== Manga ===
Saint Young Men, written and illustrated by Hikaru Nakamura, began its serialization in Kodansha's seinen manga magazine Morning Two on September 26, 2006. The series was put on hiatus between September 22, 2011, and March 22, 2012, because of Nakamura's pregnancy. The magazine ceased print publication and moved to a digital release starting on August 4, 2022. Its first tankōbon (collected volume) was released by Kodansha on January 23, 2008, and the twenty-third volume was published on November 20, 2026. A guidebook was released on April 23, 2013.

In 2010, Jason Thompson reported that Ed Chavez, editor of the American publisher Vertical, contacted the Japanese licensor of the series to request its publishing in North America. The Japanese licensor of the series refused to allow it to be published in North America, because it was thought that Americans might take offense to it. However, in April 2019 Kodansha Comics announced that it acquired the rights to publish the manga digitally. After two volumes were released digitally between April and June 2019, the publisher announced in July its plans to publish the manga in print. Nevertheless, a third digital volume was released in October before the first 2-in-1 omnibus hardcover volume was released on December 17, 2019.

The series has also been translated in other languages, including Chinese by Tong Li Publishing, French by Kurokawa, German by Egmont Manga, Italian by J-Pop, and Spanish by Norma Editorial.

==== Volumes ====
No.	Original release date	Original ISBN	English release date	English ISBN
1	January 23, 2008	978-4-06-372662-6	December 17, 2019	978-1-632369-36-9
2	July 23, 2008	978-4-06-372720-3	December 17, 2019	978-1-632369-36-9
3	March 23, 2009	978-4-06-372784-5	March 17, 2020	978-1-632369-75-8
4	October 23, 2009	978-4-06-372842-2	March 17, 2020	978-1-632369-75-8
5	May 24, 2010	978-4-06-372906-1	September 1, 2020	978-1-632369-76-5
6	December 24, 2010	978-4-06-372962-7	September 1, 2020	978-1-632369-76-5
7	October 21, 2011	978-4-06-387026-8	November 10, 2020	978-1-632369-99-4
8	December 3, 2012	978-4-06-387168-5	November 10, 2020	978-1-632369-99-4
9	August 23, 2013	978-4-06-387232-3	March 9, 2021	978-1-64651-000-9
10	May 23, 2014	978-4-8124-5333-9; 978-4-06-362274-4 (limited edition)	March 9, 2021	978-1-64651-000-9
11	February 23, 2015	978-4-06-388434-0; 978-4-06-358762-3 (limited edition)	August 24, 2021	978-1-64651-164-8
12	November 20, 2015	978-4-06-388532-3; 978-4-06-362317-8 (limited edition)	August 24, 2021	978-1-64651-164-8
13	October 21, 2016	978-4-06-388654-2; 978-4-06-362339-0 (limited edition)	January 25, 2022	978-1-64651-231-7
14	September 22, 2017	978-4-06-510272-5; 978-4-06-397040-1 (limited edition)	January 25, 2022	978-1-64651-231-7
15	June 22, 2018	978-4-06-512011-8; 978-4-06-511313-4 (limited edition)	March 1, 2022	978-1-64651-280-5
16	November 22, 2018	978-4-06-513787-1; 978-4-06-511314-1 (limited edition)	March 1, 2022	978-1-64651-280-5
17	July 23, 2019	978-4-06-516515-7; 978-4-06-516517-1 (limited edition)	June 21, 2022	978-1-64651-281-2
18	May 22, 2020	978-4-06-519418-8; 978-4-06-519417-1 (limited edition)	June 21, 2022	978-1-64651-281-2
19	March 23, 2021	978-4-06-522540-0; 978-4-06-522565-3 (limited edition)	June 27, 2023	978-1-64651-428-1
20	July 22, 2022	978-4-06-528557-2; 978-4-06-528558-9 (limited edition)	June 27, 2023	978-1-64651-428-1
21	March 22, 2024	978-4-06-534952-6; 978-4-06-534953-3 (limited edition)	November 18, 2025	978-1-64651-589-9
22	July 22, 2025	978-4-06-540034-0; 978-4-06-540033-3 (limited edition)	November 18, 2025	978-1-64651-589-9
23	November 20, 2026	978-4-06-540034-0; 978-4-06-540033-3 (limited edition)	—	—

=== Anime ===
The production of an anime film was first announced in issue No. 44 of Weekly Morning. Before the film release, a guidebook to the film was published on April 30, 2013. The film was directed by Noriko Takao and written by Rika Nezu. Its characters were designed by Naoyuki Asano and the music was composed by Keiichi Suzuki and Ryomei Shirai. The film was produced by Aniplex, Kodansha and Toho, was animated by A-1 Pictures, and distributed by Toho. It premiered in Japan on May 10, 2013. On May 8, 2013, its soundtrack was published by Aniplex and the main theme "Gag" was released on Speedstar Records. Later, on October 23, 2013, it was released in DVD and Blu-ray formats. In addition to the film, the same staff produced an original animation DVD (OAD) that was released along with the eighth manga volume. A second OAD was released along with the ninth volume.

In an interview with NHK World, the staff for the anime noted that they wanted to stay loyal to the artwork of the manga while creating the movie. They decided to focus more on the art and character designs, and decided to give it a "sketched" look, instead of the traditional "bold, dark lines" typically used. All the shadows were colored by pencils, sometimes even scribbled to make sure that the "sketched" look came through. Like the manga, the anime film also recreates various attractions of Tachikawa, including the Showa Memorial Park.

=== Live-action ===
In November 2016, a live-action drama series adaptation of the manga was announced with no further details. The following month, Yūichi Fukuda was revealed to be the director and screenwriter, while Takayuki Yamada was announced as the producer. Only in February 2018, the main actors were unveiled; Ken'ichi Matsuyama playing Jesus and Shōta Sometani playing Buddha. In April, it was set to debut in the summer of that year on Kakao Japan's streaming service Piccoma TV, but, by June, it changed to fall. Starting on October 12, 2018, the web series received a two-week limited screening in over 40 AEON theaters. It was followed by the premiere on Piccoma TV on October 18; the same day a special screening with staff and cast was also held in Toho Cinemas Roppongi Hills. The first six-minute episode out of ten was also made available through YouTube.

In February 2019, a second and a third season were announced through the Monthly Morning Two magazine. A teaser and a poster for the second season were released in April, when it was also announced that the ten-episode season would stream online on Piccoma TV on June 1 and in theaters starting on June 6. NHK General TV rebroadcast the first season between June and July 2019, and planned to show the second season on October 5 and 12, 2019. Only the first half of the second season was broadcast in October because of the Typhoon Hagibis and it had to be rescheduled to January 25, 2020. The ten-episode third season premiered and finished before it on NHK, on January 11 and 18, 2020 respectively.

A live-action movie, called Sei ☆ onīsan THE movie ~ holymen VS akuma gundan ~ is set to be released in theaters on December 20, 2024. Matsuyama and Sometani are to reprise their roles from the series.

== Reception ==
=== Manga ===
Saint Young Men received the 2009 Tezuka Osamu Cultural Prize for Short Work Manga. The 2009 edition of Takarajimasha's guidebook Kono Manga ga Sugoi!, which surveys people in the manga and publishing industry, named it the best manga series for male readers. It was nominated for the 2009 Manga Taishō Award and for the category "Best Comic" at the 2012 Angoulême International Comics Festival. As the result of its popularity, issues of Monthly Morning Two started selling out on newsstands; because of this, in May 2009 Kodansha began making the magazine available online the day it is published. It has been among the top 20 of best-selling manga series in Japan in 2009, 2011, and 2013. All the first eleven individual volumes appeared on lists of the 50 best-selling manga of their respective year in Japan, while the 12th featured in the top 100; volume 15 was also among the top 50 best-selling manga of the year, and volume 16 was the 35th best-selling manga in the first half of 2019. By June 2018, the manga had sold about 16 million copies in Japan. The manga was also displayed at the British Museum in 2011. In 2014, The Daily Dot reported a growing Western fandom that spread various Tumblr GIFs of the series.

Comics writer Paul Gravett chose it as one of the best comics of Japan in 2008, while writers Shaenon Garrity and Jason Thompson elected it as one of the most wanted titles for licensing in 2010. In 2014, writing for the newspaper Der Tagesspiegel, German critic Anne Maren Delseit elected it the third best comic book of the year. Japanese manga critic Kaoru Nagayama has noted that the manga is "fun to read" and commended Nakamura for keeping Jesus and Buddha faithful to their real character—of kindness—even when confronted by evil. Carlo Santos from Anime News Network criticized it for its art and questioned its capacity to evolve into something other than "Jesus and Buddha hanging out, while normal people do embarrassing things to them". Santos complained that Jesus' and Buddha's philosophical differences and personalities are not explored. However, Santos praised the series' comedy, noting its simplicity and saying, "its brilliance comes not from purposely trivializing two of the world's great religions, but by highlighting the quirks of the secular world when these famous religious figures are placed in it". According to him, the series does not lose its capacity of making readers laugh as it progresses, unlike other manga. Jolyon Baraka Thomas of The Guardian praised the constancy of "visual gags and puns", and wrote: "Her story is not an introduction to abstruse religious doctrines, nor does it feature much overt commentary on the role of religions in contemporary society."

=== Film ===
The anime film adaptation of Saint Young Men debuted at number nine in Japanese theaters, grossing ¥49,930,836 (US$491,369) on 75 screens. In the subsequent weekends it decreased on its placement from nine to eleven, and then to twelve, closing its run with ¥300 million yen ($1,888,062) grossed. Its DVD release ranked seventh on its first week on the list of best-selling anime DVDs in Japan, dropping to twenty-ninth place on its second week on the list.
