= List of Hikari no Densetsu characters =

left to right: Takahaki Ooishi, Hikari Kamijo, and Hazuki Shiina

This is a list of fictional characters from the anime and manga series Hikari no Densetsu created by Izumi Aso.

== Main characters ==
Hikari Kamijo
Voiced by: Tsukasa Itou
The main character of the anime and manga series. Hikari is a young energetic girl in her first year of high school. She lives together with her parents and her older sister, Miyako in Tokyo. Hikari has dreamed of being a great gymnast like her idol, Diliana Gueorguiva, ever since she saw her compete at a young age. At first her skills as gymnast do not come close to tournament material but with the help and support of Ooishi and Mao she is able to bring her true talents to light. Through a series of life experiences she works hard to develop her skills. She begins to realize that there are more important things in life than winning an Olympic medal. She develops strong feelings for Mao and in the end she will have a bright future with him.

Takahaki Ooishi
Voiced by: Nobuo Tobita
Takaaki Oiishi is one of the main male characters of the manga and anime series. He is the best male gymnast of the school and is the most popular guy in his whole school. He is very supportive of Hikari and along with Mao he helps her improve her gymnastic skills in order for her to become the best gymnast she can be. During both the anime and manga series he begins a similar journey to Hikari in the sense that he also dreams of winning the Olympics. While working on doing so he develops feelings for Hikari and Shiina, but does not know which one to choose. He also begins friendship and a rivalry between him and Mao for Hikari's attention. In the manga it is explained that he and Shiina are engaged and go to Korea to support Hikari as she competes.

Hazuki Shiina
Voiced by: Michie Tomizawa
Hazuki is the main rival of Hikari in the manga and anime series. She is the best gymnast in her school where she, Hikari, Ooishi, and Mao go to and is seen as the person with the most potential for the 1988 Seoul Olympics in Korea. Hazuki has always been confident about her abilities thanks to the complements she gets at school from her teachers and classmates. Through the series she becomes good friends with Hikari. But as Hikari begins to improve her skills as a gymnast, Hazuki begins to fear Hikari's abilities and during this time a healthy rivalry between the two is formed. Like Hikari she also develops feelings for Ooishi and becomes a rival for Hikari for his attention. In the anime it is seen as Hikari won Oosihi's heart, but the story was not completed in the anime. In the manga the rivalry between two for Ooishi's attentions continues even stronger. Near the end of the manga series it is also shown that Shiina has been diagnosed with leukemia and that she is in great need of treatment. Despite this she remains strong and travels to Korea along with Ooshi to support Hikari while she competes. In the anime it is shown at the end that in later years she retires and opens up a school for young girls who like her at some point want to become champions of rhythmic gymnastics.

Mao Natsukawa
Voiced by: Yoshimasa Inoue
Hikari's childhood friend, best friend and the leader of a band called Mr. D. He goes to the same school as Hikari, Ooishi, and Shiina. Very little is known of him, his family is never shown. He dreams of becoming a Rock'n'Roll superstar. Mao is always there for Hikari, helping her by supplying his music to her performance while he works to get a record deal. His emotional feelings are linked to the emotional feelings of Hikari, Ooishi, and Shiina. In the anime it seems that Ooishi has won Hikari's affection, but the rivalry in the manga series between Mao and Ooishi continued longer. In the end of the manga it seems that Mao finally wins Hikari's affection.
Side note: originally Mao Natsukawa was an anime only character who was created by the script producers of the anime series. He appeared from the beginning in the anime series on the first episode till the end of the series, but he did not appear on the manga series until volume four when the author (Izumi Aso) decided to make him part of the manga story. From then on he was a recurring character in the manga, eventually becoming a main character in the manga series.

== Secondary characters ==
Megumi Mita
She is a young school girl who like Hikari and Shiina aspires to be rhythmic gymnast at the olympic level of competition. Megumi has great gymnastic skills and it can be seen in her performances. Just looking at her makes people want to spin, twirl, and dance. She is very possessive and dislikeable at times. Like Maria, she is very competitive and determined in what she does. She likes and enjoys watching Hikari fail in her performances in any way possible. To see or know that Hikari is going to any sort of difficulty will bring satisfaction to Amamiya. Her biggest dream is to beat Hikari in every competition that they may enter together. Although she is quick to show her rivalry to Hikari she quickly begins to develops a secret admiration for Hikari's ability as a gymnast and like Shiina begins to see her as a serious competitor to worry about in competition to qualify for the Olympics. At the end of the anime series she is able to fully admit that she admires Hikari and applauds her performance openly in one of the competitions.
Miyako Kamijou
Voiced by: Hiromi Tsuru
Miyako is Hikari's older sister and is a very important person in Hikari's life. As an older sister she is very understating of Hikari and is always there to support her. She has all the qualities of an older: time tested and mature because of this, wise when it comes to making serious decisions, and ready to include her sister Hikari in her concerns or ideas/understand Hikari's worries and concerns and ideas. And is quickly to complement and support Hikari during her performances. She is often seem during Hikari's competitions as part of the audience or at home cooking dinner with Hikari and her mother. At the end of the series it is discovered that she has a boy friend: Arnaud.
Yukko and Satomi
They are two more other female gymnasts who like Hikari and all other competitors dream of becoming great gymnasts. They considered characters that were made to make series look better and to help bring the environment of gymnastic competition in the story. Like The three puppets They are often seen together in both anime and manga series. Yukko and Satomi are Hikari's best friends and are often supportive of her during her Journey to become a great champion in the sport of rhythmic gymnastics.
Maria Lenova
Maria is a fourteen-year-old gymnast from Bulgaria. She is considered the one that can take the Olympic title of rhythmic gymnastics from the queen of rhythmic gymnastic, Diliana Gueorguiva. Maria has shown that she has the potential to be in the top of the gymnasts in her competitions. Maria excels in gymnastic competitions with her perfect ten grades in the round ribbons (which she is able to surpass Hikari and even Shiina in that round of competition). She leaves her home in Bulgaria and moves to Japan to participate in Queen's cup. A very determined and competitive young woman, she quickly develops a friendly rivalry with Hikari, who is the athlete that she wants to defy and beat, a desire that is also expressed by Diliana. And while she comes off as snobbish at times, she is very friendly and secretly admires Hikari's abilities. She also enjoys making friends and likes the company she gets from Mao's band members. Before leaving to Bulgaria, Lenova makes Hikari promise to win every competition she enters so that they can once again meet in competition and clash. (the anime series ended before this friendship was able to develop).
Keisuke Togashi
Keisuke Togashi is a former school athlete of artistic gymnastics. In his past life as a school athlete he was a candidate for the Olympic Games of gymnastics. In the anime and manga series the Federation of gymnastics has appointed him as the trainer of Hikari after she is able to finish second place in the gymnastic tournaments in Bulgaria (The International Junior Championship) which is an equal merit with Maria Levona. He on the other hand does not have any interest or desire in becoming Hikari's trainer. All of this is because of a heavy secret hidden in his past (he carries a big weight on his shoulders because of it) And for a period of approximately four months he avoid his assignment and he is not seen nor introduces himself to Hikari. During this period Takaaki Ooishi is often seen periodically around Togashi's house trying to convince him, often at times persuading Togashi that he is the only trainer that can help Hikari refine her talents as a gymnast. Finally, after months of persuasion Keisuke appears and introduces himself to Hikari during a performance. This is the first that Togashi is seen watching and observing Hikari with the mentality of a teacher watching her future student.
Diliana Gueorguiva
She is the grand champion of the world of rhythmic gymnastics from Bulgaria. She has never been beaten and is seen as force to be reckoned with when it comes to competition. Any other major competitor who has competed against her has failed to take away the Olympic medal from her. She incarnates the true spirit of rhythmic gymnastics, with her beauty, grace, elegance, energy, difficulty and complexity of her routines in her performances. Because of all these reasons, Hikari admires her very much. Hikari dreams of being just like her, even though she knows that she has but a very small chance of ever achieving this. In the series Diliana has a very small, but notable role due to her being Hikari's idol. She causes a huge shock when she withdraws from competition at the eleventh hour (which is never explained in the series). This fuels Hikari's desire to be like her even more. The former world champion is very surprised by the talent of Cynthia, at the time of this ultimate competition (and at one point even offers her to come with her to Bulgaria to train with her).
Chachamaru
Chachamaru is Hikari's family pet dog. He is seem most of the time in the anime sleeping or resting in different part of the house. At times Hikari confides in him and tells him what worries her or any problem she has in her mind. While Chachamaru is at first perceived as lazy, he is very energetic at heart and is very loving to Hikari and her sister, and helps her with her training during her long runs through to be a champion in rhythmic gymnastics.
The Commentator
He is the man that speaks during the rhythmic competitions of Hikari. His main role in the anime and manga is to announce the rhythmic competitor's name, age, school of origin, and what they are going to perform. He plays a very important part during the rhythmic competitions, explaining the movements that each competitor is performing and the conflicts that Hikari and the other competitors experience while they are performing their routines. He also at the end of the routines tells the scores of the competitors and the positions that they are in the competition.
