= Juni Taisen: Zodiac War =

Japanese light novel series & its adaptations

- Light novel cover

十二大戦
- Manga

Dōshitemo Kanaetai Tatta Hitotsu no Negai to Wari to Sō demo Nai 99 no Negai
- Written by: Nisio Isin
- Illustrated by: Hikaru Nakamura
- Published by: Shueisha
- Magazine: Weekly Young Jump
- Published: January 8, 2015
- Light novel

Jūni Taisen
- Written by: Nisio Isin
- Illustrated by: Hikaru Nakamura
- Published by: Shueisha
- English publisher: NA: Viz Media
- Imprint: Jump J-Books
- Published: May 19, 2015
- Manga

Jūni Taisen
- Written by: Nisio Isin
- Illustrated by: Akira Akatsuki
- Published by: Shueisha
- English publisher: NA: Viz Media
- Imprint: Shonen Jump
- Magazine: Shōnen Jump+
- Original run: September 23, 2017 – May 12, 2018
- Volumes: 4
- Anime television series
- Directed by: Naoto Hosoda
- Produced by: Mika Shimizu; Tomoyuki Ōwada; Hiroshi Kamei; Gaku Nakagawa; Yoshiyuki Shioya; Gōta Aijima; Kōtarō Horiguchi; Ryōichi Ishibashi; Kazuto Matsumura
- Written by: Sadayuki Murai
- Music by: Go Shiina
- Studio: Graphinica
- Licensed by: AUS/NA: Funimation
- Original network: AT-X, MBS, Tokyo MX, BS11
- Original run: October 3, 2017 – December 19, 2017
- Episodes: 12
- Light novel

Jūni Taisen Tai Jūni Taisen
- Written by: Nisio Isin
- Illustrated by: Hikaru Nakamura
- Published by: Shueisha
- Imprint: Jump J-Books
- Published: December 12, 2017
- icon

Juni Taisen: Zodiac War (Japanese: 十二大戦, Hepburn: Jūni Taisen; lit. "Wars of the Twelve") is a Japanese light novel written by Nisio Isin and illustrated by Hikaru Nakamura. It was published by Shueisha on May 19, 2015. It is a prequel to and ends with their one-shot manga titled "The One Wish That Must Be Granted, and the Ninety-nine That Can Be Done Without", published in Weekly Young Jump on January 8, 2015. The novel is licensed by Viz Media, which released an English translation in October 2017. An anime television series adaptation produced by Graphinica aired from October 3 to December 19, 2017. The sequel novel Zodiac War vs Zodiac War (十二大戦対十二大戦, Jūni Taisen Tai Jūni Taisen) was released on December 12, 2017.

== Plot ==
In a city of half a million people who have all been removed, twelve of the deadliest warriors with the names and attributes of the Chinese zodiac animals are pitted against each other in the twelfth Zodiac Tournament, which takes place every twelve years. During this rendition, each warrior is asked to swallow one of twelve crystallized poison jewels known as Beast Gems (Juseki), which will kill each of the warriors after twelve hours. To be granted any one wish of their choosing, the winner must retrieve all the crystals from the other eleven competitors before the deadline (midnight, December 12). It becomes a ruthless battle where survival is crucial by any means.

== Characters ==
Characters are listed in the order of the Chinese zodiac.

Tsugiyoshi Sumino (墨野 継義, Sumino Tsugiyoshi) / Rat (寝住, Nezumi)
Voiced by: Shun Horie (Japanese); Daman Mills (English)
Rat is a silver-haired teenager who always appears sleepy. He has an ability called "The Hundred Paths of Nezumi-san", which allows him to choose or experience 100 possible realities. His selected path becomes the factual reality; however, the process is mentally exhausting, which explains his sleepy appearance. Additionally, there are situations where none of the routes turn out well for him. He allies with the pacifist Monkey. His way of killing is "killing all". He is the only one in the tournament without a wish.
Eiji Kashii (樫井 栄児, Kashii Eiji) / Ox (失井, Ushii)
Voiced by: Yūichirō Umehara (Japanese); Ian Sinclair (English)
Ox is a horned man with long black hair who carries a long thin saber called "Goboken". He is regarded as the "Genius of Slaughter", a peerless warrior and one of the tournament's favorites. His way of killing is "killing systematically". Rat never learns Ox's wish as he is only given questions in response.
Kanae Aira (姶良 香奈江, Aira Kanae) / Tiger (妬良, Tora)
Voiced by: Hiromi Igarashi (Japanese); Colleen Clinkenbeard (English)
Tiger is a young orange-haired woman with a long chain extending from a collar around her neck and a tendency to drink to excess. She is a former martial arts master turned soldier who discovered her bestial drunken fist techniques after a night of despair-driven binge drinking. She encountered Ox years earlier on a battlefield and was influenced by his philosophy. During the tournament, she agrees to a truce with Ox for their mutual benefit. Her way of killing is "killing in a drunken rage". According to Rat, her wish has something to do with meeting Ox again.
Rabbit (憂城, Usagi)
Voiced by: Nobuhiko Okamoto (Japanese); Jerry Jewell (English)
Rabbit is a muscular white-haired, psychotic young man who fights with two long knives. He used speed and agility to close in on his opponents. He is also a necromantist who can control the bodies of those he has killed like puppets, whom he calls his "friends". The puppets retain their original abilities. The necromancy also applies to Rabbit himself after his technically self-inflicted death, continuing his efforts to win the match. One of the favorites of the competition. His way of killing is "killing psychotically". According to Rat, his wish is to be "friends" with everyone in the world.
Nagayuki Tsumita (積田 長幸, Tsumita Nagayuki) / Dragon (断罪兄弟・兄, Tatsumi Kyōdai Ani)
Voiced by: Takuya Eguchi (Japanese); Clifford Chapin (English)
Dragon is the older twin brother of Snake. He can fly using an ability known as "Heaven's Holding" and uses liquid nitrogen in a tank on his back to create a stream of freezing air. He and his brother have the same way of killing, "killing for money". According to Rat, his wish is for money.
Takeyasu Tsumita (積田 剛保, Tsumita Takeyasu) / Snake (断罪兄弟・弟, Tatsumi Kyōdai Otōto)
Voiced by: Kohsuke Toriumi (Japanese); Matt Shipman (English)
Snake is the younger twin brother of Dragon and uses a flamethrower with a fuel tank on his back. He possesses a radar-like sense by feeling vibrations in the ground around him; this ability is known as "Earth's Guidance". He and his brother have the same way of killing, "killing for money". According to Rat, his wish is for money.
Yoshimi Sōma (早間 好実, Sōma Yoshimi) / Horse (迂々真, Ūma)
Voiced by: Hikaru Midorikawa (Japanese); Randy E. Aguebor (English)
Horse is a self-proclaimed moderate of enormous stature. He was a soldier who became a warrior after his body was modified with the help of medicine and science to gain incredible strength and developed an impenetrable defensive technique called the "Stirrup". He hopes to ally with Ox during the tournament. His way of killing is "killing silently". According to Rat, his wish is to have talent.
Sumihiko Tsujiie (辻家 純彦, Tsujiie Sumihiko) / Sheep (必爺, Hitsujii)
Voiced by: Chō (Japanese); Kenny Green (English)
Sheep is a short, older man with horns and a past winner of the tournament. He is a master of explosives and grenades, honed as an arms dealer and smuggler from his younger years. He volunteers to join the present tournament to spare his family despite his low chances of success. His way of killing is "killing deceptively". According to Rat, his wish is for his family to live in peace.
Misaki Yūki (柚木 美咲, Yūki Misaki) / Monkey (砂粒, Sharyū)
Voiced by: Saori Hayami (Japanese); Caitlin Glass (English)
Monkey is a short-haired, spectacled young woman. She is a renowned pacifist and mediator, responsible for facilitating countless ceasefires across many battles, but with mixed results for the surviving populations. At the start of the tournament, she proposes a peace agreement; the tournament winner would wish all competitors back to life, so no warrior would have to die permanently. She allies with Rat during the tournament. Monkey possesses the power to transmute any material she touches into another state, such as turning stone into sand. She can use transmutation skills with her unparalleled martial arts and superhuman physical prowess. One of the favorites to win the tournament. Her way of killing is "killing peacefully".
Ryōka Niwa (丹羽 遼香, Niwa Ryōka) / Chicken (庭取, Niwatori)
Voiced by: Ayane Sakura (Japanese); Monica Rial (English)
Chicken is a young, green-haired woman in a revealing outfit made of feathers. At first, she appears to be a timid individual, but this is later revealed to be a façade to manipulate those around her. She possesses the ability "Eye of the Cormorant", which allows her to communicate with and control birds. During the tournament, she approaches Dog with an alliance to defeat Rabbit and his puppets. Her way of killing is "killing by pecking". According to Rat, her wish is to have confidence.
Michio Tsukui (津久井 道雄, Tsukui Michio) / Dog (怒突, Dotsuku)
Voiced by: Tomohiro Nishimura (Japanese); Chuck Huber (English)
Dog is a dark-haired man with a canine-like appearance. He can produce deadly poisons for both killing enemies and doping allies. His most prized drug is known as "One Man's Army", giving a huge strength buff to whoever he injects. He also believes he can synthesize an antidote to the poison gem within his body. He agrees to ally with Chicken, although he has little respect for her fighting abilities. His way of killing is "killing by biting". According to Rat, his wish has something to do with his adopted daughter but is never fully revealed.
Toshiko Inō (伊能 淑子, Inō Toshiko) / Boar (異能肉, Inōnoshishi)
Voiced by: Yoko Hikasa (Japanese); Stephanie Young (English)
Boar is a young, voluptuous, blond-haired woman and the daughter of the previous tournament's winner. Although initially reluctant to kill when she was younger, she earned her position by driving her younger sister to suicide when their father did not choose her for the tournament. She uses twin heavy machine guns with a "Non-reload" ability, giving her unlimited ammunition. Her way of killing is "killing bountifully". According to Rat, her wish is to have a harem of 3.5 billion men.
Duedeculpe (ドゥデキャプル, Dudekyapuru)
Voiced by: Hiroki Yasumoto (Japanese); Mark Stoddard (English)
Duodecuple is the mysterious referee whose job is to host and manage the Zodiac Tournament and grant the winner's wish. The tournament is a proxy battle for control of the countries possessed and to control the betting on the outcome. He monitors the tournament in the presence of faceless VIP avatars. When only six warriors remain, the VIPs can begin wagering on individual warriors. When only three warriors remain, they can bet on the outcome.

== Media ==
=== Light novel ===
Nisio Isin and Hikaru Nakamura wrote and illustrated the novel respectively, which was published by Shueisha on May 19, 2015. Viz Media have licensed the light novel for an English release in 2017. Its light novel sequel was released on December 12, 2017.

A prequel short-story to Jūni Taisen Tai Jūni Taisen titled "'Zodiac War vs. Zodiac War' Trailer: Eve of the War" (『十二対大戦対十二大戦』予告編 大戦前夜, "Jūni Taisen Tai Jūni Taisen" Yokoku-hen Taisen Zen'ya) was included in the November 2017 issue of Jump Square bonus booklet released on October 4, 2017. It was later reprinted in the fourth volume of the manga adaptation.

No.	Title	Original release date	English release date
1	Juni Taisen: Zodiac War; Jūni Taisen (十二大戦)	May 19, 2015; 978-4-08-780755-4	October 10, 2017; 978-1-4215-9750-8
2	Jūni Taisen Tai Jūni Taisen (十二大戦対十二大戦)	December 12, 2017; 978-4-08-703440-0	—

=== Manga ===
A one-shot manga titled "The One Wish That Must Be Granted, and the Ninety-nine That Can Be Done Without" (どうしても叶えたいたったひとつの願いと割とそうでもない99の願い, Dōshitemo Kanaetai Tatta Hitotsu no Negai to Wari to Sō demo Nai 99 no Negai) was published in Weekly Young Jump on January 8, 2015.

A manga adaptation by Akira Akatsuki has been announced and was serialized in Shueisha's Shōnen Jump+ app and website on September 23, 2017. Viz Media started distributing the manga via Weekly Shonen Jump on September 23, 2017. It was published until May 12, 2018, and collected into four volumes.

No.	Original release date	Original ISBN	English release date	English ISBN
1	November 2, 2017	978-4-08-881270-0	October 2, 2018	978-1-9747-0250-3
2	January 4, 2018	978-4-08-881328-8	December 4, 2018	978-1-9747-0249-7
3	April 4, 2018	978-4-08-881371-4	February 5, 2019	978-1-9747-0251-0
4	July 4, 2018	978-4-08-881418-6	April 2, 2019	978-1-9747-0563-4

=== Anime ===
An anime adaptation is produced by Graphinica, with Naoto Hosoda directing, Sadayuki Murai writing scripts, Chikashi Kadekaru designing characters, and Go Shiina composing the music. It aired from October 3 to December 19, 2017. The opening theme is "Rapture" by Panorama Panama Town, while the ending theme is "Keshin no Kemono" (化身の獣) by Do As Infinity. It ran for 12 episodes. Crunchyroll streamed the series. Funimation streamed the series with a simuldub. In Australia and New Zealand, Madman Entertainment is distributing the series, on behalf of Funimation.

No.	Title	Directed by	Written by	Storyboarded by	Original air date
1	"Even Boars May Become Pigs After Seven Generations"; Transliteration: "Inoshishi mo Nana Daime ni wa Buta ni Naru" (Japanese: 猪も七代目には豚になる)	Naoto Hosoda	Sadayuki Murai	Naoto Hosoda	October 3, 2017
In a city now devoid of people, Boar, with light machine guns akimbo heads towards a central building. As she enters the building, she reminisces about becoming the family's contender in the Zodiac Tournament. At the top, she sees the other contenders, although one, Snake, is already dead. The mysterious referee appears and tells them to swallow the gems of the tournament, containing a poison that will kill them in 12 hours. The winner must retrieve all the gems from the other competitors before the deadline. They will then receive the antidote and make any wish they desire. After he leaves, Monkey suggests that the best way would be to collaborate and for the winner to wish the others back alive, so no one has to die. While some see it as a good idea, Boar thinks it is stupid. The floor suddenly gives way, with the competitors dropping to the lower levels. Boar runs into Rabbit and thinks she can kill him, but she is grabbed from behind by the headless body of Snake, which is controlled by Rabbit, who then stabs her through the heart. She finally realizes Rabbit is a necromancer as she succumbs to the wound. Rabbit reassures her that she will become one of his reanimated "friends".
2	"Tricks Both Mongrel and Fowl"; Transliteration: "Keimeikutō" (Japanese: 鶏鳴狗盗)	Kōji Kobayashi; Yūsuke Kubo	Tetsuya Yamada	Naoto Hosoda; Yūsuke Kubo	October 10, 2017
After killing her, Rabbit retrieves the gem inside Boar's body. Meanwhile, Monkey and Rat form a loose alliance and head underground while the other contestants plan their respective strategies. Rabbit now has the reanimated Snake and Boar under his control. Boar openly walks the streets acting as a possible decoy to lure out other Zodiac Warriors. Meanwhile, Dog confidently believes his body can generate an antidote to the poison giving him an advantage. He meets up with Chicken, whom he thinks will be a convenient but expendable short-term ally as she can monitor the others by using her ability to control birds. Dog bites Chicken to enhance her physical and mental capabilities to combat Boar and Snake. However, Chicken instead preemptively kills Dog by crushing his skull. In the underground, Horse meets Ox, who immediately goes on the attack.
3	"Cutting a Chicken with a Beef Cleaver"; Transliteration: "Gyūtō o Motte Niwatori o Saku" (Japanese: 牛刀をもって鶏を裂く)	Ryūta Ono	Tatsuya Takahashi	Ryūta Ono	October 17, 2017
As Chicken retrieves the gem from inside Dog's body, she recalls her earlier life as an abused child who killed her parents. She suffered from severe amnesia but showed an ability to communicate with birds. The Niwa family then took her in, which turned her into a killer who carried out their instructions without conscience. In the present, she instructs her birds to attack Boar. Although many are killed, they eventually prevail and devour her body. In the subway tunnel, Ox relentlessly attacks Horse, who has extremely durable skin. Chicken meets Rat in a convenience store, who offers to take her to Monkey. Chicken follows him into the underground sewers, calculating when she should make a move to kill them. Still, she is uncertain of Monkey's motives. Eventually, she leaves, wondering why she did not kill them. She realizes that the enhanced power from Dog's bite has enhanced her emotions along with her mind and body, making her more sensitive. As she walks, engrossed in her thoughts, she encounters a blood-stained Ox. Chicken considers fleeing the scene, knowing there is a little chance against the unrivaled Ox. However, Dog's poison twists her logic to fight him directly. Ox then quickly kills her, retrieving both Chicken and Dog's gems. As she dies, she permits her birds to feed on her body.
4	"The Enemy, a Noble Primate"; Transliteration: "Teki mo Saru Mono, Hikkaku Mono" (Japanese: 敵もさる者、ひっかく者)	Tomoyuki Kurokawa	Noboru Takagi	Naoto Hosoda	October 24, 2017
Sharyu the Monkey is shown training to transmute substances between physical states to split a huge rock before she leaves the monkey society, vowing to use her powers for good. In the present, Rat tells Monkey that Chicken is probably dead, her resolve weakened by Monkey's optimistic attitude. Monkey still plans to end the war between the warriors. Still, Rat is much more cynical and is not interested in saving what he believes are worthless lives. A flashback shows Monkey successfully negotiating a ceasefire between two warring countries where she appealed to the soldiers themselves. Yet, her solution was short-lived, and the fighting and deaths continued. Rat still believes peace is futile and suggests she use her powers to stop the war. Although she has witnessed countless deaths and atrocities, she still pursues peace. As she muses, she and Rat are attacked by a flock of birds and head to the surface, where Rabbit and the headless Snake confront them and prepare to fight.
5	"A Wolf in Sheep's Clothing"; Transliteration: "Hitsuji no Kawa o Kabutta Ōkami" (Japanese: 羊の皮をかぶった狼)	Kazuya Miura	Tetsuya Yamada; Sadayuki Murai	Kazuya Miura	October 31, 2017
Duedeculpe explains the nature of the Zodiac Tournament to faceless VIP avatars as he updates them on the contestants' progress and their relative prospects of victory. The warriors remaining with gems in order of strength are Ox, Rabbit, Monkey, Sheep, Horse, Rat, and Tiger. Hiding out, Sheep considers his strategy the best, proven by his previous victory. He recalls his past as a young arms dealer and warrior with a special skill in explosives. He married into the family of one of his close clients, and after he won the tournament, he was granted his wish to have a grandson. He vows that he will also take out the other warriors if he loses the tournament. Craftily, he did not swallow his poisonous gem, which gave him an advantage. Meanwhile, Rabbit attacks Monkey, but she can dodge and repel his attacks while trying to convince him to join her so that they all survive. He just ignores her and uses Chicken's vicious birds to attack Monkey as well. Meanwhile, Ox finds Sheep, who barely escapes, leaving an explosive booby trap behind. Horse is still alive but wounded and emerges from the underground, shocked by Ox's attacks. The headless Snake pursues Rat with a flamethrower, and Rat finally realizes that Snake uses the sound of his movement to follow him. Sheep comes across a drunken Tiger in a park, considering her a minor threat until she easily detects his concealed presence.
6	"Even a Champion Racehorse May Stumble"; Transliteration: "Senri no Uma mo Ketsumazuku" (Japanese: 千里の馬も蹴躓く)	Hiroshi Hara	Sadayuki Murai	Hiroshi Hara; Yūsuke Kubo	November 7, 2017
Against his better judgment, Sheep realizes he may have to fight the extremely drunken Tiger sooner rather than later. Meanwhile, each fighter pursues their agenda. Headless Snake pursues Rat while Monkey continues to fight Rabbit. Rabbit, although strong, seems to lack martial arts skills, but using Snake's head placed in a tree to track her movements, he manages to kill Monkey with his twin swords. As Sheep plans his move, Tiger suddenly strikes, killing him and removing his gem before he even realizes what happened. Duedeculpe declares only six warriors remain, and the VIP avatars begin to place their bets. As he hides out in a bank vault, Horse thinks back to how he was almost destroyed in a fall from a cliff as a soldier. After his body was modified to gain incredible strength and virtually impenetrable skin, he became a warrior. Suddenly he hears Rat next to him, who says that Monkey is dead along with her peace proposal. After warning that Snake may be following him, he leaves Horse alone. As Horse is caught up in his own thoughts of how to survive, he realizes that Snake has set the building on fire, starving him of oxygen, and he dies in the inferno.
7	"In Like a Dragon, Out Like a Snake (Part 1)"; Transliteration: "Ryūtōdabi (Senkō)" (Japanese: 竜頭蛇尾(先攻))	Shintarō Dōge	Tetsuya Yamada	Shintarō Dōge	November 14, 2017
In a flashback to the start of the Zodiac Tournament, Snake and Dragon enter the central building, assuming that with their teamwork, they cannot lose. Snake and Dragon were thieves chosen by their clans to be tournament representatives in the past, warning them that only one could be the victor. Back at the start of the tournament, they meet Rabbit, who appears harmless, but suddenly decapitates Snake while the twins discuss the situation. Back in the present, Rabbit's puppet Monkey finds Horse, but his gem is already gone, and she drags his body back to Rabbit. Meanwhile, Tiger encounters the headless Snake. She severs his arm and relieves him of his tank of alcohol which she promptly starts drinking. Snake seems immobilized, so she walks off, but Ox arrives and severs Snake's other arm. Tiger faces off against Ox, but suddenly Snake's severed arms grab them by their throats and begin to choke them. Ox proposes to Tiger that they temporarily set aside the tournament and have their own duel. When she agrees, he uses his sword to create a spark, igniting the alcoholic foam dripping from her mouth and setting Snake's arm on fire.
8	"In Like a Dragon, Out Like a Snake (Part 2)"; Transliteration: "Ryūtōdabi (Kōkō)" (Japanese: 竜頭蛇尾(後攻))	Yutaka Kagawa; Kiyoto Nakajima	Tetsuya Yamada	Ryōtarō Makihara	November 21, 2017
Dragon watches as Snake's severed arms strangle Ox and Tiger. In a flashback, Dragon and Snake are being tried for crimes that damage the prestige of the twelve houses. Both sides engaged them in a deal involving criminals supplying orphans to a pharmaceutical research facility for illegal experimental drugs. However, they decided to betray their clients and take all the money themselves, destroying the facility and killing everyone inside. They also accepted money to destroy surviving witnesses. Although they sometimes distributed the fortunes they stole to the poor, their good intentions often backfired, making the gestures quite hollow. After being acquitted of the crimes due to Dragon's convincing arguments as a defense attorney, they were chosen as representatives for the Zodiac Tournament. Back in the present, Ox's strategy of burning Snake's severed arms is effective, and he and Tiger are freed. Ox then realizes that burning is the only way to stop Rabbit's zombie puppets. Meanwhile, Dragon plans a fitting memorial service for his younger brother Snake.
9	"The Man Who Chases Two Rabbits Catches Neither"; Transliteration: "Nito Ou Mono wa Itto Mo e Zu" (Japanese: 二兎追うものは一兎も得ず)	Kōji Kobayashi; Naoki Ao	Tatsuya Takahashi	Naoki Ao	November 28, 2017
As Dragon floats high above the warriors engaged below, Rabbit's puppet Monkey throws Snake's head towards him. This distracts him long enough for Rabbit to jump up and slice him in half, leaving only three other warriors alive, Rat, Ox, and Tiger. In a flashback, Tiger Kanae is chosen at her family's Aira-style martial arts dojo at the representative to go out and fight as a warrior fulfilling their philosophy. However, she found that the battlefield was not a place of righteous battle and honor but a killing field and sought relief in alcohol. She then discovered her abilities were stronger on all fours like a tiger, making her an even more effective, unstoppable warrior. Back in the present, Ox and Tiger, completely unused to planning, realize that they need a way to stop Rabbit's puppets, who have been cut to pieces. Ox hints to Tiger that Dragon's liquid coolant tank may be the key. As the fight begins with Rabbit's puppets, Tiger takes Dragon's tank and bursts it, freezing their adversaries. Rabbit then emerges from the shadows, but without his puppets, he is easily cut down by Ox and Tiger. Tiger then prepares for her postponed duel with Ox.
10	"A Tiger May Die, but It Leaves Its Skin"; Transliteration: "Tora wa Shin de Kawa o Nokosu" (Japanese: 虎は死んで皮を残す)	Takaaki Ishiyama; Akiko Nakano	Tatsuya Takahashi	Ryōtarō Makihara; Keiichi Sugiyama	December 5, 2017
In the past, Tiger Kanae was surrounded by troops in snowy city streets, too drunk and cold to fight. Ox appears on the scene, kills the troops, and rescues her, not knowing who she is. She is impressed by his simple but natural philosophy that doing the right thing is just a choice followed by action, inspiring her to focus on her physical training. At the start of the Zodiac Tournament, she was angry that Ox did not remember her from the past since he had such a big influence on her life. Back in the present, Rabbit's severed arms holding a sword attack Ox. Without thinking, Tiger pushes him out of the way and is stabbed instead, even though she reasons that Ox would have been able to defend himself. Rabbit and his puppet's body parts attack Ox and he flees, taking the mortally wounded Tiger with him. Rather than die by Rabbit's hand and become a puppet, she asks Ox to kill her, and he agrees, but only as a result of a duel. Ox asks Tiger if they met before and has a grudge against him, but she responds that she dislikes brooding types like him.
11	"To Treat a Man to Beef from His Own Cow"; Transliteration: "Hito no Gobō de Hōji Suru" (Japanese: 人の牛蒡で法事する)	Yūsuke Kubo	Sadayuki Murai	Yūsuke Kubo	December 12, 2017
Ox finds himself unusually affected by the death of Tiger and contemplates the nature of the Zodiac Tournament and Rabbit's attempt to win even after his own death. He realizes his saber will be ineffective against Rabbit, who can only be stopped by incineration. A reanimated Rabbit, combined with the body parts of the warriors he killed, approaches Ox. Ox slices Rabbit but is unexpectedly attacked and pinned down by a reanimated Monkey so that Rabbit can kill Ox himself. As Ox is about to give up, Rat arrives at the scene. Using Sheep's explosives, Rat destroys the remaining competitors, becoming the winner. Rat presents the eleven gems from the other fallen warriors to Duedeculpe and is then asked to recount his tournament experience. He is reluctant to discuss it and decides to leave; however, he has multiple visions of being killed if he does and realizes that he is trapped. Rat explains that he can simulate a hundred scenarios before taking action. He further adds that luck still plays a part even with this seemingly invincible power. Following the interview, he leaves the building.
12	"The One Wish That Must Be Granted, and the Ninety-nine That Can Be Done Without"; Transliteration: "Dōshitemo Kanaetai Tatta Hitotsu no Negai to Wari to Sō demo Nai 99 no Negai" (Japanese: どうしても叶えたいたったひとつの願いと割とそうでもない99の願い)	Kōji Kobayashi	Sadayuki Murai	Naoto Hosoda	December 19, 2017
With the city returned to normal, Rat goes back to school. He contemplates his wish as the winner of the Zodiac Tournament but has no idea what he should wish for. He thinks about his discussions with the other tournament participants and their wishes, often surprised by their answers. He realizes that he is the one person in the tournament without a wish. For him, thinking of a wish is like seeing multiple visions of the future and the hundred wishes that he thinks of; each one has an upside and a downside. Finally, confronted by Duedeculpe to decide, he wishes to forget anything related to the tournament. He returns to school the following day, sitting at his desk and dozing off as usual. However, another student remarks that he appears fulfilled as if he does not want anything in the world.
