= Black Night Parade =

Japanese manga series

- First tankōbon volume cover

ブラックナイトパレード (Burakku Naito Parēdo)
- Genre: Comedy; Supernatural
- Manga
- Written by: Hikaru Nakamura
- Published by: Shueisha
- English publisher: NA: Seven Seas Entertainment
- Imprint: Young Jump Comics
- Magazine: Weekly Young Jump (November 2, 2016 – July 25, 2019); Ultra Jump (September 19, 2019 – October 19, 2026)
- Original run: November 2, 2016 – October 19, 2026
- Volumes: 11
- Live-action film
- Directed by: Yūichi Fukuda
- Written by: Yūichi Fukuda; Tetsuo Kamata
- Music by: Eishi Segawa
- Studio: Credeus
- Released: December 23, 2022
- Runtime: 108 minutes
- icon

Black Night Parade (Japanese: ブラックナイトパレード, Hepburn: Burakku Naito Parēdo) is a Japanese manga series written and illustrated by Hikaru Nakamura. It was serialized in Shueisha's seinen manga magazine Weekly Young Jump from November 2016 to July 2019, before continuing in Ultra Jump from September 2019 to October 2026. The series has been collected into eleven tankōbon volumes as of December 2025. A live-action film adaptation was released in Japan in December 2022.

== Media ==
=== Manga ===
Written and illustrated by Hikaru Nakamura, Black Night Parade was initially serialized in Shueisha's Weekly Young Jump magazine from November 2, 2016, to July 25, 2019. The series later continued its publication in Shueisha's Ultra Jump magazine from September 19, 2019, to October 19, 2026. As of December 2025, eleven tankōbon volumes have been released.

The manga is licensed in English by Seven Seas Entertainment.

==== Volumes ====
No.	Original release date	Original ISBN	English release date	English ISBN
1	December 9, 2016	978-4-08-890564-8	November 7, 2023	979-8-88843-189-4
1. "Merry Christmas, and a Happy New Job" (ハッピー内定クリスマス!!の巻, Happī Naitei Kurisumasu!! no maki); 2. "My Nightmare Job" (就職ナイトメアの巻, Shūshoku naitomea no maki); 3. "An Era Ended in Death" (先代・イズ・デッドの巻, Sendai izu deddo no maki); 4. "The Shady Magic that Makes Christmas Happen" (魔法という名のクリミナルの巻, Mahō to yū na no kū riminaru no maki); 5. "Utterly Disappointing Presents!" (金・銀・コール！ プレゼントの巻, Kin gin Kōru！Purezento no maki); 6. "A Road to a Lifetime of Black Employment" (ロード・トゥ・ブラック終身雇用の巻, Rōdo to burakku shūshin koyō no maki); 7. "Black Temptation, Red Destiny" (黒の誘惑、赤いデスティニーの巻, Kuro no yūwaku, akai desutinī no maki)
2	November 17, 2017	978-4-08-890799-4	February 20, 2024	979-8-88843-336-2
8. "It's the North Pole Dream" (キャッチ・ザ・北極ドリームの巻, Kyacchi za Hokkyoku dorīmu no maki); 9. "The Incident at Nerima Station North Exit Powson's" (練間北口ポーソン事変の巻, Ren-kan kitaguchi Pōson jihen no maki); 10. "Test Your Reindeer Might!" (測定！ 知力・体力・トナカイ力の巻, Sokutei！Chiryoku tairyoku tonakai-ryoku no maki); 11. "A Wonderful Mystery to Spend the Weekend On!" (ステキ・謎トキ☆ホワイトホリデイの巻, Suteki nazo toki ☆ howaito horidei no maki); 12. "Remembering a Black Christmas Past" (愛と追憶のブラッククリスマスの巻, Ai to tsuioku no burakku kurisumasu no maki)
3	December 19, 2018	978-4-08-891067-3	May 14, 2024	979-8-88843-627-1
13. "The Un-fortunate Gingerbread Cookie!" (呪いの!? アンフォーチュンジンジャークッキーの巻, Noroi no!? Anfōchun jinjākukkī no maki); 14. "A Bitter Tale of Strawberry Mochi" (大福もちビターストーリーの巻, Daifuku-mochi bitā sutōrī no maki); 15. "Trial by Conveyor Belt!" (ベルトコンベアは試練と思い出を乗せての巻, Beruto konbea wa shiren to omoide o nosete no maki); 16. "A Heart of Steel" (鉄の心の巻, Tetsu no kokoro no maki); 17. "Nerima'ing in Another World!" (異世界練間とはじめてのおつかいの巻, Isekai-ren-kan to hajimete no o tsukai no maki); 18. "It's On, Brother! Santa Mania!" (降臨！ サンタマニアの巻, Kōrin！Santa Mania no maki)
4	December 19, 2019	978-4-08-891317-9	August 20, 2024	979-8-88843-845-9
19. "A Wonderful Holiday" (すてきなホリデイの巻, Suteki na horidei no maki); 20. "Thunder and Lightning" (雷鳴と稲妻の巻, Raimei to inazuma no maki); 21. "With Great Reindeer Power Comes..." (正しく使おうトナカイパワーの巻, Masashiku tsukaō tonakai pawā no maki); 22. "Cupid's Spiteful Arrow" (仁義なきキューピッドの矢の巻, Jingi naki Kyūpiddo no ya no maki); 23. "The Strongest Flowers Are Poisonous" (強い花には毒があるの巻, Tsuyoi hana ni wa doku ga aru no maki); 24. "It's Bring Mom to Work Day" (母を引き連れ三千里の巻, Haha o hikitsure sanzen ri no maki); 25. "The Thrill of a Company Tour" (心臓破りの会社見学の巻, Shinzō yaburi no kaisha kengaku no maki); 26. "Faceless Santa and the Hungry Mice" (腹ペコネズミと顔のないサンタの巻, Harapeko nezumi to kao no nai Santa no maki)
5	June 19, 2020	978-4-08-891447-3	November 26, 2024	979-8-89160-175-8
27. "The Battle Always Happens Suddenly" (修羅場はいつも突然にの巻, Shuraba wa itsumo totsuzen ni no maki); 28. "When Good Boys Must Turn Bad" (時にはいいコじゃいられないの巻, Toki ni wa ii ko ja irarenai no maki); 29. "It's There, Even If It Can't Be Seen" (見えなくてもそこにあるの巻, Mienakutemo soko ni aru no maki); 30. "The Sad, Sad Proof" (悲しき証明の巻, Kanashiki shōmei no maki); 31. "The Biggest Company Secret, Straight from the Boss's Mouth" (社長の口は社内秘の口の巻, Shachō no kuchi wa shanaihi no kuchi no maki); 32. "Your Friendly Neighborhood Drosselmeyer" (親切なドロッセルマイヤーの巻, Shinsetsu na dorosserumaiyā no maki); Bonus: "The Ever-Changing Whims of Upper Management" (上司は思いつきでものを言うの巻, Jōshi wa omoitsuki de mono o iu no maki)
6	December 18, 2020	978-4-08-891739-9	April 22, 2025	979-8-89160-926-6
33. "The Secret of Santa Claus House" (サンタハウスの秘密の部屋の巻, Santa hausu no himitsu no heya no maki); 34. "Silent Night" (静かなる夜の巻, Shizuka naru yoru no maki); 35. "The World Santa Knows" (サンタだけの世界の巻, Santa dake no sekai no maki); 36. "Your Cold Body on the Holiest of Nights" (聖夜に君は冷たくなるの巻, Seiya ni kimi wa tsumetaku naru no maki); 37. "Donner and Blitzen" (ドンダーとブリッツェンの巻, Donner to burittsen no maki); 38. "The Dystopian Christmas" (ドンダーとブリッツェンの巻, Disutopia Kurisumasu no maki)
7	December 17, 2021	978-4-08-892175-4	August 26, 2025	979-8-89373-602-1
39. "All Thanks to You and All My Fault" (君のおかげで僕のせいの巻, Kimi no Okage de Boku no Sei no Maki); 40. "Bamboo Shoots Never Lie" (たけのこ派は偽れないの巻, Takenoko-ha wa Itsuwarenai no Maki); 41. "The Powerful Blood of Atlas" (特別な血のアトラスの巻, Tokubetsu na Chi no Atorasu no Maki); 42. "A Child's Anguish" (子の苦悩の巻, Ko no Kunou no Maki); 43. "He Who Fought Back" (歯向かう者の巻, Hamukau Mono no Maki); 44. "Red Santa Claus's Sword" (赤いサンタの剣の巻, Akai Santa no Ken no Maki)
8	December 19, 2022	978-4-08-892503-5	November 18, 2025	979-8-89373-603-8
45. "The Seven Salted Children" (7人の塩づけの子供の巻, Shichinin no Shiozuke no Kodomo no Maki); 46. "Everyone Is the Same and Everyone Is Good" (みんな一緒でみんないいの巻, Minna Issho de Minna Ii no Maki); 47. "Dancer and Prancer" (ダンサーとプランサーの巻, Dansā to Puransā no Maki); 48. "Shino's Far from Home" (志乃ズ・ファー・フロム・ホームの巻, Shinozu Fā Furomu Hōmu no Maki); 49. "The Wisdom King Is Basically Cupid" (赤き明王はキューピッドの如しの巻, Akaki Myōō wa Kyūpiddo no Gotoshi no Maki); 50. "Return of the Thunder and Lightning Tag Team!" (雷鳴タッグ再び！の巻, Raimei Taggu Futatabi! no Maki)
9	December 19, 2023	978-4-08-893109-8	March 3, 2026	979-8-89373-604-5
51. "Like a Lion" (ライク・ア・ライオンの巻, Raiku a Raion no Maki); 52. "Hino Miharu: Rising" (三春ライジングの巻, Miharu Raijingu no Maki); 53. "Go! Go! Christmas Man!" (それいけ！ クリスマスマンの巻, Sore Ike! Kurisumasuman no Maki); 54. "The Queen of Santa Claus House" (サンタハウスの女王の巻, Santa Hausu no Joō no Maki); 55. "A Pyramid, but for Whom?" (誰がための金字塔の巻, Dare ga Tame no Kinjitō no Maki); 56. "Flames of Revenge" (リベンジ・ファイアの巻, Ribenji Faia no Maki)
10	December 18, 2024	978-4-08-893550-8	June 23, 2026	979-8-89561-329-0
57. Ken no Yōsei Tsudou Toki no Maki (剣の妖精集う時の巻); 58. Gantai Ojisan to Fushigi na Ken no Maki (眼帯おじさんとふしぎな剣の巻); 59. Kuro Santa no Tonakai Banare no Maki (黒サンタのトナカイ離れの巻); 60. Fuyu no Kami ni Erabareshi Mono no Maki (冬の神に選ばれし者の巻); 61. Shūchaku no Kita no Hate no Maki (終着の北の果ての巻); 62. Omoide Ippai Yume Ippai no Maki (思い出いっぱい夢いっぱいの巻)
11	December 18, 2025	978-4-08-894047-2	October 27, 2026	979-8-89863-169-7
63. Santakurōsu no Yasashī Me no Maki (サンタクロースの優しい目の巻); 64. "Ano Hi" no Maki ("あの日"の巻); 65. Santa no Karada o Motsu Kodomo no Maki (サンタの体を持つ子供の巻); 66. Re: Hajimemashite no Maki (Re:はじめましての巻); 67. Atsuki Jikangai Rōdō no Maki (熱き時間外労働の巻); 68. O Miai Wō no Maki (お見合いウォーの巻)
12	December 17, 2026	978-4-08-894465-4	—	—

=== Live-action film ===
In August 2022, it was announced that the series would be receiving a live-action film adaptation, starring Ryo Yoshizawa and Kanna Hashimoto. The film is directed by Yūichi Fukuda, based on a screenplay written by Fukuda and Tetsuo Kamata, with music composed by Eishi Segawa. It was released in Japan by Toho on December 23, 2022. Eve performed the theme song "Shirayuki" (白雪; "White Snow").
