= Kamijō Station =

Kamijō Station is the name of two train stations in Japan:

- Kamijō Station (Nagano)
- Kamijō Station (Niigata)
