= Miracle Hikaru =

- Born: Rika Tamura (田村 梨果, Tamura Rika); April 9, 1980 (age 46); Toyooka, Hyōgo, Japan
- Occupations: Comedian and impressionist

Miracle Hikaru (ミラクルひかる, Mirakuru Hikaru) (born 9 April 1980), is a Japanese impressionist of the comedic performing arts from Toyooka, Hyōgo. She is best known for her impersonation of Hikaru Utada. Her professional activities are currently managed by Jinsei Pro.

Prior to her career as an Impressionist, she was a hairstylist. She initially came to Tokyo to gain a position as a stylist at a renowned hair salon. Miracle has been noted to have a sheep phobia.

On January 23, 2008, Miracle Hikaru released "Miracle (1)," a hip-hop album in the mimicry style of Hikaru Utada. It has 8 tracks, distributed by King Records.

== Works ==
=== Films ===
- 2015: Galaxy Turnpike

=== Television ===
- 2005 -: Kōhaku Uta Gassen
- FNS 26-jikan terebi kokumin-tekina omoshiro-sa! Shijō saidai! ! Manatsu no kuizu matsuri 26-jikan buttōshi supesharu (Fuji TV)
- Nakai Masahiro no burakkubaraeti (NTV)
- Toribianoizumi 〜 subarashiki muda chishiki 〜 (Fuji TV)
- Chi-chin puipui (Mainichihōsō) `kyō no dare?' No kōnā Kayō sapuraizu (NTV)
- Kayō sapuraizu (NTV)
- Monomaneōzaketteisen (Fuji TV)
- 2011: Run for Money Tōsō-Chū (Fuji TV)
- 2013: Hikaru ☆

=== Radio ===
- Miracle Hikaru no Mono Mane Paradise (FM Jungle)
- OH! MY RADIO with Hirai Ken (J-WAVE TOKYO FM)
- Shall Wee Talk (FM Jungle)

=== Web ===
- 2007: Round and round Miracle (GyaO Jockey Internet TV)
- 2007: Round and round Miracle Ring (GyaO Jockey Internet TV)

=== Stage ===
- 2010: "Yoko" role at 7th performance of CM "TIME II"

== Discography ==
- 2008: Miracle 1

== Idol DVD ==
- 2010: It’Miracle
- 2010: MIRACLE BODY
- 2011: SWINUTION
- 2011: Miracle Juice

== Impression repertoire ==
- Hikaru Utada
- Anpanman
- Mari Hamada
- Ayumi Hamasaki
- Paako Hayashiya
- Mika Nakashima
- Shizuka Kudō
- Seiko Matsuda
- Yumi Matsutoya
- Aya Matsūra
- Chisato Moritaka
- Tomoko Nakajima (of Othello)
- Yukie Nakama
- Masami Nagasawa
- Moe Oshikiri
- Keiko Toda
- Juri Ueno
- You
