= Hikaru Shimizu =

Japanese footballer

Personal information
- Date of birth: 19 July 1996 (age 30)
- Place of birth: Kanagawa, Japan
- Height: 1.75 m (5 ft 9 in)
- Position: Midfielder

Team information
- Current team: Azul Claro Numazu
- Number: 19

Youth career
- –2018: Fuji University

Senior career*
Years	Team	Apps	(Gls)
2019	Azul Claro Numazu	6	(0)
2020–	FC Kariya		
- * Club domestic league appearances and goals as of 17:04, 13 November 2020 (UTC)

Hikaru Shimizu (清水 光, Shimizu Hikaru; born 19 July 1996) is a Japanese footballer currently playing as a midfielder for Azul Claro Numazu of J3 League.

== Career statistics ==
=== Club ===
As of 13 November 2020.

Club	Season	League			National Cup		League Cup		Other		Total	
Club	Season	Division	Apps	Goals	Apps	Goals	Apps	Goals	Apps	Goals	Apps	Goals
Azul Claro Numazu	2019	J3 League	6	0	0	0	–		0	0	6	0
Career total			6	0	0	0	0	0	0	0	6	0
