= Hikaru Ozawa =

Japanese footballer (born 1988)

Hikaru Ozawa 小澤 光
Personal information
- Full name: Hikaru Ozawa
- Date of birth: March 9, 1988 (age 38)
- Place of birth: Kanagawa, Japan
- Height: 1.73 m (5 ft 8 in)
- Position: Midfielder

Youth career
- 2006–2009: Toin University of Yokohama

Senior career*
Years	Team	Apps	(Gls)
2010–2018	YSCC Yokohama	224	(7)
- * Club domestic league appearances and goals as of 23 February 2019

Hikaru Ozawa (小澤 光, Ozawa Hikaru; born March 9, 1988 in Kanagawa) is a former Japanese football player who last featured for YSCC Yokohama.

== Club statistics ==
Updated to 23 February 2019.

Club performance			League		Cup		Total	
Season	Club	League	Apps	Goals	Apps	Goals	Apps	Goals
Japan			League		Emperor's Cup		Total	
2010	YSCC Yokohama	JRL (Kanto)	13	3	1	0	14	3
2011	YSCC Yokohama	JRL (Kanto)	13	1	1	0	14	1
2012	YSCC Yokohama	JFL	26	2	2	0	28	2
2013	YSCC Yokohama	JFL	30	0	–		30	0
2014	YSCC Yokohama	J3 League	31	0	2	0	33	0
2015	YSCC Yokohama	J3 League	34	0	–		34	0
2016	YSCC Yokohama	J3 League	26	0	–		26	0
2017	YSCC Yokohama	J3 League	24	0	0	0	24	0
2018	YSCC Yokohama	J3 League	27	1	1	0	28	1
Career total			224	7	7	0	231	7
