= Izumi Aso =

Japanese manga artist

Izumi Aso 麻生 いずみ
- Born: Aso, Izumi; November 14, 1960 (age 66) Saitama Prefecture, Japan
- Areas: Writer, Penciller, Inker
- Notable works: Hikari no Densetsu, Natural

Izumi Aso (麻生 いずみ, Asō Izumi; born November 14, 1960 in Saitama Prefecture, Japan) is a Japanese manga artist known for her Hikari no Densetsu series.

== Biography ==
Izumi Aso at an early age was a very active young woman who enjoyed drawing. In her late teens she decided that she was going to become a manga artist. In the early 1980s she debuted as a manga artist and writer in Margaret Magazine (with "NY de dokkiri!"), this would become the magazine/publishing house that would go on to edit and publish her other works of manga series in the future. As a manga artist, Aso focused on the style of drawing that gives the impression that the drawn figures are going to pop out of the pages. This style would later become useful in her later manga works that would focus on sports such as baseball, skating, among other sports. Aso would later on after her debut as an artist detache her interest for the depiction of the body in motion and would search for a more emotional expression in her later works of as a manga artist.

She was able to achieve this with her later manga series such as "Serina Bible" that lasted one volume and "Natsu Shinwa" which lasted two volumes, where serialized through Margaret Comics. Afterwards in late 1985 Aso began working on the manga series "Hikari no Densetsu," which would become the "masterpiece" of her career as a manga artist. Hikari no Densetsu proved to be popular and a few months after the manga series has been serialized, an anime series was already being produced. The manga series told the story of a young gymnast who dreams of becoming a great rhythmic gymnast. Aso, a former competitive gymnast herself, used her personal experiences as well her training as a manga artist specializing on the art of movement to bring a solid depth to her drawings of gymnastics in the Hikari no Densetsu series. The manga series appeared weekly on Margaret Magazine, which was drawn by Aso in single-handed attempts without the need of any assistants. The anime series was ended after only 19 episodes due to weak ratings on Japanese TV, but the manga series continued to be serialized, ending almost three years later in Margaret magazine, concluding in 16 small volumes. To date Hikari no Densetsu is by far her longest manga series.

After Hikari no Densetsu she continued to work in other of her manga series where she would later on be seen using more tragic themes and other mature experimental themes found in her more famous work of manga, like the triangle love themes, that were absent in the beginning of her work. Parallel to Hikari no Densetsu, Izumi began to work a comedy called "Natural", which after Hikari is the second most longest manga series with 9 volumes. As a result of the conclusion of Hikari no Densetsu, Aso has not been able to attract the attention of the manga public. She tried with several other works of sports comedy series that were based on ice skating, horseback riding such as: "Lion Dream," "Blackbird," and "Tenshi to Miru Yume" among others, and while they are deemed as great by manga critics but they do not collect enough support to guarantee a long serialization. This is why her later works are one or two volumes only.

In the last couple of years Izumi Aso has entirely dedicated her drawing talents to the world of the Lady's Comics. And while she has been rarely seen in the manga scene lately, she still enjoys a small amount of popularity among many manga readers and anime fans for her Hikari no Densetsu series; particularly in Europe were the anime series became a huge success. The manga series also has a strong fan base in Japan where in the early 2000's, the series was reissued in 8 large volumes in Tankōbon form featuring a combination of drawings from Aso and black and white pictures of competitive gymnasts offered by Marianeve Fiorenza.

== Manga work ==
- Hikari no Densetsu
- Natural
- Serina Bible
- Natsu no Shinwa
- Matenrou no Tameiki
- Matenrou no Aria
- Keiji Karen - 24ji no Tokai (Detective Karen - City at 24 o'clock)
- Usagi no Rabu Kaado (Love Card of a Rabbit)
- Usagi no Kirameki LOVE (Sparkling Love of a Rabbit)
- Aitsu no Koi Menu (Her Love Menu)
- Osharena Sasupensu (Fashionable Suspense)
- Arimi Sos
- Burakkubaado (Blackbird)
- Lion Dream
- Love shot! Jun
- Tenshi to Miru Yume
