= Arakawa Under the Bridge =

Japanese manga series

- Cover of the first manga volume featuring Nino

荒川アンダー ザ ブリッジ (Arakawa Andā za Burijji)
- Genre: Surreal comedy
- Manga
- Written by: Hikaru Nakamura
- Published by: Square Enix
- English publisher: NA: Crunchyroll (digital); Vertical (physical)
- Magazine: Young Gangan
- Original run: December 3, 2004 – July 3, 2015
- Volumes: 15
- Anime television series
- Directed by: Yukihiro Miyamoto; Akiyuki Shinbo
- Produced by: Gou Shukuri (King Records)
- Written by: Deko Akao
- Music by: Masaru Yokoyama
- Studio: Shaft (Note: Animation assistance (アニメーション協力) for season 1 provided by Diomedéa, and for season 2 provided by Marvy Jack.)
- Licensed by: AUS: Hanabee; NA: NIS America; UK: MVM Films
- Original network: TV Tokyo, TVQ, TVO, TVA, TSC, TVh, AT-X
- Original run: April 4, 2010 – December 26, 2010
- Episodes: 26

Arakawa Under the Bridge (Japanese: 荒川アンダー ザ ブリッジ, Hepburn: Arakawa Andā za Burijji) is a Japanese manga series written and illustrated by Hikaru Nakamura. The manga was first serialized in the seinen manga magazine Young Gangan from December 2004 to July 2015. An anime television series adaptation consisting of 26 episodes in total by Shaft was broadcast in Japan from April to December 2010 on TV Tokyo.

== Plot ==
Set in Arakawa, Tokyo, the series tells the story of Kou Ichinomiya, a man who has accomplished everything by himself. Ever since he was little, his father has taught him one rule: to never be indebted to another person. One day he is attacked by child bullies in the bridge, they remove his pants and attach them high up in the bridge archer, in trying to retrieve them, he falls into the Arakawa River and almost drowns. A girl by the name of Nino rescues him and, in return, he owes her his life. Unable to accept the fact that he is indebted to her, he asks her about a way for him to repay her. In the end, she tells him to love her, beginning Kou's life of living under a bridge. However, as Kou starts to learn, Arakawa is a place full of weirdos and all of the people living under the bridge are what society would call "denpa-san".

== Characters ==
Kou Ichinomiya (市ノ宮 行, Ichinomiya Kō)
Voiced by: Hiroshi Kamiya
Played by: Kento Hayashi
Kou is the future owner of the Ichinomiya corporation. He is 22 years old and a university student before living under the bridge. Throughout his life, he has been living under the family rule of never being indebted to anyone. After nearly drowning in the river, he started a relationship with his savior, Nino, because it was the only way to remove the debt of saving his life. He is named "Recruit" (リクルート, Rikurūto) by the village chief, but the villagers usually call him "Ric" ("Riku") for short. If he becomes indebted to someone but cannot repay them, he will start having an asthma attack. Even since he was little, he has received the best education, learning how to play multiple instruments and earning a black belt in karate. Kou took the option of staying in the "villa" rather than Nino's house when he moved into the village, not knowing that the "villa" was the empty top of a pillar under the bridge. He quickly remedies the situation by building himself a proper apartment at the location. His job in the village is to be the teacher for the village's children. Due to his upbringing and his sudden intrusion into life under the bridge, he is exasperated at the nonsensical happenings that the others would consider normal.
Nino (ニノ, Nino)
Voiced by: Maaya Sakamoto
Played by: Mirei Kiritani
A mysterious girl who lives in Arakawa. She is a self-claimed Venusian and later Kou's girlfriend. The origin of her name comes from the sweatsuit that she always wears that has the tag "Class 2-3" (Ni-no-san) on it. She is an incredible swimmer and can stay submerged for several minutes. With this skill, Nino commonly goes fishing in the river and it is her job in the village to provide fish for the residents. She often forgets important information and often needs Kou to remind her. Her home is constructed of cardboard, with the entrance sealed by a large curtain. Her lavish bed is made out of velvet, although she chooses to sleep in the drawer under the bed. If she becomes frightened or angry, she will pull her sweatsuit over her head and climb on top of a streetlamp.
Village Chief (村長, Sonchō)
Voiced by: Keiji Fujiwara
Played by: Shun Oguri
The village chief is a self-proclaimed 620-year-old kappa (despite him obviously wearing a green kappa costume). As chief, anyone who wants to live in the village has to get his approval and have him give the person a new name. His face changes when he is running very fast, as shown in the village's annual race. It is unknown if he is faster than Shiro, since every year, he always loses interest in the race and drops out by default. Using the excuse of preparing for the trip to Venus, he tricked the villagers into building him a villa under the river. He seems to have some secret and is protecting Nino. He does realize that he is not really a kappa, and in times of seriousness, he will stop wearing his suit. He has great influence with the local government, as shown when he single handedly stopped Ric's father's plan to destroy Arakawa. He is very protective of Nino, even threatening Shimazaki, who was researching Nino, with death.
Hoshi (星, Hoshi)
Voiced by: Tomokazu Sugita
Played by: Takayuki Yamada
A 24-year-old singer and a self-proclaimed superstar. He is in love with Nino and is always jealous of Kou for their relationship. Under his star mask is a moon mask and under that is his real face, which has red hair. When he becomes depressed, he will start calling himself a starfish, and wears his star mask backwards. He likes to go to the nearby convenience store and buy cigarettes. Four years prior, he was a top-notch singer and supposedly constantly topped the Oricon charts. But he was bothered by the fact that he could never come up with his own songs. While battling with this feeling, he met Nino and realized that what he wanted was music that he created himself. His job is to provide music during special events in the village, but his songs' lyrics are mostly weird and complete nonsense. His name literally means "Star."
Sister (シスター, Shisutā)
Voiced by: Takehito Koyasu
Played by: Yuu Shirota
A strong man that dresses like a nun. Twenty-nine years old and British, Sister is a war veteran with an affinity for artillery and always has a gun with him. He has a scar on the right side of his face, whose origin is unknown. He cares for Nino's wellbeing as well as asking Kou if his love for Nino was real. Every Sunday, he holds a mass that usually lasts only a few seconds in the church under the bridge. This involves having his congregation run to line up, firing his machine gun in the air, and asking if anyone did anything wrong. If he gets no response, the service ends and everyone present gets a bag of cookies. It is unknown what would happen if anyone had done anything wrong. Strangely, while Sister is dressed as a Catholic sister, his church is adorned with an Orthodox cross. Under his robe is a military outfit from his days as a soldier. He may still believe himself to be in the middle of a war, as he lays down booby traps all the time and is shown to always be thinking in terms of military strategics. He is in love with Maria, whom he met during the last war he was in, whose insults are the only things that can unnerve him, causing his scar to open up. Surprisingly, he is good at making cookies and other sweets.
Shiro (シロ, Shiro)
Voiced by: Hōchū Ōtsuka
Played by: Toru Tezuka
A cordial, 43-year-old man who is obsessed with always stepping on a white line (since he believes his wife will turn into a white cornish if he does not, something he fears above anything else), therefore he always walks around pushing a line painter so that he always has something white to walk on. According to him, he has had this obsession six years prior to the start of the series and has not seen his family since. His real name is Toru Shirai (白井 通) and he used to be an office worker at a major corporation before he started living under the bridge. He does not have a job for the village though. He is married to a wife who understands his obsession and has a high school-aged daughter. Despite being estranged with his family, they seem to still be very close, with his wife lining up and mailing him the forms for stepping on white lines tournaments. Though usually polite with everyone in the village, he is shown to be fiercely competitive; he spends the entire year training for the village's annual race, because "it's the only time [he] gets the spotlight." It is hinted that he may be the strongest person in the village. During the village's Sumo Wrestling competition, Sister and Maria, both being war veterans and heavily experienced fighters, and the Chief, a self proclaimed kappa and the reigning master of Sumo Wrestling at the village, all forfeited when they saw Shiro obsessively chanting his determination to stay in the shikiri-sen, the two white lines at the centre of a Sumo wrestling ring. His name literally means "White."
Metal Brothers (鉄人兄弟, Tetsujin Kyōdai)
Voiced by: Ryōko Shintani / Yūko Sanpei
Played by: Takuto Sueoka / Raito Mashiko
Tetsuo (鉄雄) and Tetsuro (鉄郎) are a pair of young boys in sailor suits who wear metal helmets. Like Hoshi, they are jealous of Kou's relationship with Nino. They are self-proclaimed espers, saying that they have psychic powers and that their helmets are so that they will not float away or be detected by the military, with the unfortunate side-effect of them being unable to use their powers. The only powers they have said they have so far are flight and the ability to travel through time and space. Their jobs are being in charge of the hot baths in the oil barrels. Oddly enough, they are first shown to be teenagers and later seemed to regress to children.
P-ko (P子, Pīko)
Voiced by: Chiaki Omigawa
Played by: Natsumi Abe
A young red-haired girl who grows vegetables for the village. The epitome of a klutzy girl, she is literally dangerously clumsy, often turning what should be a simple accident into a massive disaster. Despite an allusion to mishaps, P-ko is still intent on getting a drivers license so that she can travel further during Winter to gather seeds. Kou is strongly against this and in their argument, he learns much to his horror that she already possesses a motorcycle license. She has a crush on the village chief, but he is unaware of her feelings. Her hair grows extremely quick, and she needs a hair cut every week.
Maria (マリア, Maria)
Voiced by: Miyuki Sawashiro
Played by: Nana Katase
Maria is a pink haired woman who runs a nearby farm where all the Arakawa residents get their dairy and produce from. While having a beautiful appearance, she casually passes out incredibly harsh insults to other people and is a sadist that can not stand a week without insulting someone. She looks down on males and only acts mean to them. She met Sister during the last war that they had and was an opposing spy that tried to get information from him.
Stella (ステラ, Sutera)
Voiced by: Chiwa Saitō
Played by: Eri Tokunaga
Stella is a little blonde girl from an orphanage in England that Sister ran. While initially thought to be small and cute, she is a powerful fighter and sometimes speaks in a threatening tone to show her superiority. When she is angry, she has the ability to turn into a giant and look extremely masculine, very closely resembling (and also often parodying) Raoh from Fist of the North Star. She has a crush on Sister, which made her hostile towards Maria initially. But after meeting and fighting Maria, she grows fond of her, and looks up to her. She considers herself the boss of Arakawa, and sees the twins as her underlings.
Seki Ichinomiya (市ノ宮 積, Ichinomiya Seki)
Voiced by: Rikiya Koyama
Played by: Takaya Kamikawa
Kou's strict father, who adheres to his family's rules and looks down on Kou. As shown, after Kou was a child, he demanded Kou to raise him as a baby, just as he had raised Kou. Despite being very cold, he does love his son. Nino seems to remind him of his wife.
Terumasa Takai (高井 照正, Takai Terumasa)
Voiced by: Chō
Played by: Kazuyuki Asano
Kou's secretary. After his wife left him, Takai became Kou's secretary in one of his companies. He became inspired by Kou and his words and becomes quite fond of him. It is also heavily implied that he has a romantic infatuation with Kou, and gets very jealous or sad when Kou is with Nino.
Shimazaki (島崎, Shimazaki)
Voiced by: Rie Tanaka
Played by: Waka Inoue
Takai's personal assistant. Although she is Takai's assistant, she takes orders directly from Seki Ichinomiya without Takai's knowledge. She has a crush on Shiro.
Last Samurai (ラストサムライ, Rasuto samurai)
Voiced by: Yūichi Nakamura
Played by: Taro Suruga
Last Samurai is a typical samurai character who runs a barbershop under the bridge, capable of cutting everyone's hair in a matter of seconds. He comes from a samurai family and the sword that he has was an inheritance passed down from his ancestors. Before he started living under the bridge, he was a famous hairdresser that captured the hearts of all his female customers. At the time, in order to prevent them from turning around and looking at him, he needed to put eye covers on all of them. He listened to all the comments of his female customers and felt that he had lost his way as a hairdresser. One night, he went to the bridge to swing his sword around and suddenly met the chief. After a brief conversation, his samurai blood boiled up and he regained his confidence. He seems to be in love with P-KO.
Billy (ビリー, Birī)
Voiced by: Fumihiko Tachiki
Played by: Norihisa Hiranuma
A man with a parrot head. He was formerly a member of a yakuza group and was well respected among the people. However, he fell in love with the wife of his boss. He would occasionally say very cool things, which usually makes Kou and Hoshi scream "aniki". He seems to believe that he really is a bird.
Jacqueline (ジャクリーン, Jakurīn)
Voiced by: Yūko Gotō
Played by: Kurume Arisaka
A woman in a bee suit who implies she has thousands of husbands and children, as she thinks she really is a queen bee, though is also in a 'forbidden' relationship with Billy. Before she started living under the bridge, she was the wife of a yakuza boss. She had an affair with one of the members in the group, who was Billy. She owns the village's salon. She can not stand not being with Billy for more than a few seconds, saying that she will die. As shown during their anniversary, she went insane after being away from Billy.
Earth Defense Troop Captain (地球防衛軍隊長, Chikyuu Boueigun Taichō)
Voiced by: Tomokazu Seki
A self-proclaimed defender of Earth who believes it is under threat from Venusians. He is actually a manga artist under the pen-name Potechi Kuwabara. He wanted to do sci-fi manga but was forced to draw moe manga by his editors. He later lives in Arakawa for a bit, before Kou found his editor. He later made an odd sci-fi manga with its characters based on the Arakawa residents and having artwork akin to JoJo's Bizarre Adventure, it was not very popular.
Amazoness (アマゾネス, Amazonesu)
Voiced by: Yu Kobayashi
An Amazon warrior who lives in the Saitama district who, along with her henchmen who wear tengu masks, defend the secret Amazonian treasure, which is really some Saitama sweets. She wears very heavy makeup, and she is considered not very attractive, but if she has a clean face, she is very good looking, shocking Kou. She will sometimes change her personality between a gruff Amazoness and an annoying teenage schoolgirl. She falls in love with Kou, as he was able to get a prize from their sweets. Her henchmen hypnotize him, to fall in love with her. But Hoshi helps Kou. She later realizes that in the end, no matter what she does Kou only has eyes for Nino. She later falls in love with Hoshi when he encouraged her to keep on trying.

== Media ==
=== Manga ===
The manga, written and illustrated by Hikaru Nakamura, was serialized in Square Enix bi-weekly seinen manga magazine Young Gangan from December 2004 and July 2015. Three special chapters were published in Young Gangan between October and November 2015. Fifteen volumes were collected in tankōbon format, with the first one released on August 25, 2005, and the fifteenth on November 20, 2015. All volumes have been translated into English and published online by Crunchyroll Manga. Vertical announced during their 2017 Katsucon panel that they have licensed the manga. The manga is licensed in Indonesia by Elex Media Komputindo.

==== Volumes ====
No.	Original release date	Original ISBN	English release date	English ISBN
1	August 25, 2005	978-4-7575-1481-2	November 11, 2017	978-1-9450-5441-9
1. The Man Who Owes No One (借りを作れない男, Kari o Tsukurenai Otoko); 2. Under the Big Star Bridge (大きな星の橋の下, Ōkina Hoshi no Hashi no Shita); 3. Positive Thinking (ポジティブシンキング, Pojitibu Shinkingu); 4. Green, Green (グリーン グリーン, Gurīn Gurīn); 5. The Inside (中身, Nakami); 6. Truth (真実, Shinjitsu); 7. Rec Under the Bridge (橋の下のリク, Hashi no Shita no Riku); 8. A Place to Repose (安息の場所, Ansoku no Basho); 9. Go; 10. New Life (新生活, Shin Seikatsu); 11. Spending Time Together (共に過ごす時, Tomo ni Sugosu Toki); 12. Leaving the Bath (湯上がり, Yuagari); 13. Uni (うに, Uni); 14. Rec's Memories (リクの思い出, Riku no Omoide); 15. Welcome Party (歓迎会, Kangeikai); 16. Transformation (変身, Henshin); 17. Battle Sister (バトルシスター, Batoru Shisutā); 18. Mass (ミサ, Misa); 19. The Teachings of Jesus (イエスの教え, Iesu no Oshie); 20. Mid-Winter Mystery (真冬のミステリー, Mafuyu no Misuterī); 21. Solution (解決, Kaiketsu); 22. Nino and the Snowy Sky (雪空のニノ, Yukizora no Nino); 23. For Love (愛ゆえに, Ai Yue ni); X. Distance (距離, Kyori)
2	December 25, 2005	978-4-7575-1576-5	November 11, 2017	978-1-9450-5441-9
3	May 25, 2006	978-4-7575-1683-0	February 13, 2018	978-1-9450-5442-6
4	December 25, 2006	978-4-7575-1836-0	February 13, 2018	978-1-9450-5442-6
5	May 25, 2007	978-4-7575-2018-9	May 22, 2018	978-1-9450-5443-3
6	December 25, 2007	978-4-7575-2162-9	May 22, 2018	978-1-9450-5443-3
7	May 25, 2008	978-4-7575-2267-1	August 14, 2018	978-1-9471-9413-7
8	December 25, 2008	978-4-7575-2430-9	August 14, 2018	978-1-9471-9413-7
9	September 25, 2009	978-4-7575-2686-0	January 29, 2019	978-1-9471-9424-3
10	April 24, 2010	978-4-7575-2858-1	January 29, 2019	978-1-9471-9424-3
11	October 25, 2010	978-4-7575-3037-9	April 30, 2019	978-1-9471-9445-8
12	July 25, 2011	978-4-7575-3297-7	April 30, 2019	978-1-9471-9445-8
13	April 25, 2013	978-4-7575-3945-7	February 18, 2020	978-1-9471-9446-5
14	May 24, 2014	978-4-7575-4156-6	February 18, 2020	978-1-9471-9446-5
15	November 20, 2015	978-4-7575-4790-2	November 17, 2020	978-1-9471-9484-7

=== Anime ===
Arakawa Under the Bridge was adapted into a 13 episodes series by the studio Shaft and was directed by Yukihiro Miyamoto with chief direction by Akiyuki Shinbo. The anime adaptation was announced in August 2009, aired on TV Tokyo from April 4 to June 27, 2010. A second season, titled Arakawa Under the Bridge x Bridge (荒川アンダー ザ ブリッジ*2, Arakawa Andā za Burijji x Burijji), aired in Japan from October 3 to December 26, 2010. NIS America announced that they had licensed the first season. The first season was released in a Blu-ray/DVD combo set in July 2011. In November 2011, NIS America announced they had licensed the second season, setting the release date for February 7, 2012. MVM Films announced that they would release both seasons on subtitle-only DVD in the United Kingdom in late 2013.

=== Television drama ===
A television drama adaption was released on July 26, 2011, on TBS and July 30 on production company MBS.

=== Live-action film ===
A live-action film adaption of the manga, starring Kento Hayashi, Mirei Kiritani, Yu Shirota, Natsumi Abe, and Nana Katase, released in Japanese cinemas on February 4, 2012.
