= Hikaru Nakamura (artist) =

Japanese manga artist (born 1984)

Hikaru Nakamura 中村 光
- Born: April 21, 1984 (age 42) Shizuoka Prefecture, Japan
- Area: Manga artist
- Notable works: Arakawa Under the Bridge; Saint Young Men
- Awards: Tezuka Osamu Cultural Prize (2009)
- Children: 1

Hikaru Nakamura (中村 光, Nakamura Hikaru; born April 21, 1984, in Shizuoka Prefecture) is a Japanese manga artist. She debuted in 2001 with the short story Kairi no Sue (海里の陶), published in Monthly Gangan Wing. She is best known as the creator of the manga series Arakawa Under the Bridge and Saint Young Men, the latter of which won a Tezuka Osamu Cultural Prize in 2009. A Nikkei Entertainment magazine article published in August 2011 listed her ninth overall among the top 50 manga creators by sales since 2010, with 5.54 million copies sold. Her artwork has also been featured in two manga exhibitions at the British Museum in London, England. Nakamura gave birth to her first child, a daughter, in November 2011.

== Vegetarianism ==
Hikaru is a lacto-ovo vegetarian who consumes dairy and eggs. She became vegetarian at age 14 after being disturbed by the sight of a deer being shot. Though she cannot tolerate real meat, she loves soy protein meat substitutes and describes restaurants serving them as "vegetarian heaven". Her family isn't vegetarian, so she has separate meals prepared. She satisfies occasional cravings for hamburgers or ramen with substitute versions.

== Works ==
- Arakawa Under the Bridge (荒川アンダー ザ ブリッジ, Arakawa Andā za Burijji), serialized in Young Gangan (2004–2015)
- Saint Young Men (聖☆おにいさん, Seinto Onīsan), serialized in Monthly Morning Two (2006–present)
- Juni Taisen: Zodiac War (十二大戦, Jūni Taisen), illustration only, serialized in Weekly Young Jump (2015)
- Black Night Parade (ブラックナイトパレード, Burakku Naito Parēdo), serialized in Weekly Young Jump (2016–2019) and Ultra Jump (2019–2026)

== Awards ==
List of Hikaru Nakamura's awards and nominations
Year	Nominated work	Category	Award	Result	Notes	Ref.
2008	Saint Young Men	Jury Selections	Japan Media Arts Festival Awards, Manga Division	Longlisted		
2009	Saint Young Men	Male Readers	Kono Manga ga Sugoi!	Won		
2009	Saint Young Men	—	Manga Taishō	Nominated		
2009	Saint Young Men	Short Work Prize	Tezuka Osamu Cultural Prize	Won		
2010	Saint Young Men	Male Readers	Kono Manga ga Sugoi!	8th place		
2012	Saint Young Men	Best Comic	Angoulême International Comics Festival	Nominated		
2015	Saint Young Men	Book of the Year	Da Vinci	12th place		
