= Hikari no Densetsu =

Manga and anime series

- Hikari no Densetsu, Vol. #1

光の伝説 (Legend of Light)
- Genre: Sports, romance, slice of life
- Manga
- Written by: Izumi Aso
- Published by: Shueisha
- Magazine: Margaret
- Original run: 1985 – December 1988
- Volumes: 16
- Anime television series
- Directed by: Tomomi Mochizuki
- Produced by: Shinji Nabeshima (ABC); Minoru Ono (Yomiko); Masatoshi Yui (Tatsunoko)
- Written by: Hideki Sonoda
- Music by: Eiji Kawamura
- Studio: Tatsunoko Production
- Original network: ANN (ABC, TV Asahi)
- Original run: 3 May 1986 – 20 September 1986
- Episodes: 19

Hikari no Densetsu (光の伝説; lit. Legend of Light) is a Japanese manga series written and illustrated by Izumi Aso about a girl named Hikari Kamijou who dreams of becoming a national rhythmic gymnastics champion. The manga series title translates into English as "Legend of Light" (the female lead character's name, Hikari, means "light" in Japanese). In the mid-1980s, the manga series was adapted into a nineteen episode anime series produced by Tatsunoko Productions, directed by Tomomi Mochizuki and broadcast on ABC.

Hikari no Densetsu is a love story that it is set in the late-1980s junior high school atmosphere, and one of the few sports anime and manga to have dealt with rhythmic gymnastics as the main subject matter. Hikari Kamijou is a naïve and carefree young woman who dreams of becoming an Olympic champion in the sport of rhythmic gymnastics since she witnessed a performance of the young Diliana Gueorguieva (a champion Bulgarian rhythmic gymnast). Although she is at first unconfident in her skills as a rhythmic gymnast, she gradually shows brilliance, achieving her dreams.

== Plot ==
The story is about Hikari Kamijou, a fifteen-year-old (Note: Hikari's age and name changes in the different versions of the anime: In the Italian version her name is Hilary and she is fourteen. In the German version her name is Hikari and she is thirteen. In the French version her name is Cynthia and she is fifteen. In the Spanish version her name is Valentina and she is twelve.) girl who develops a passion for the sport of rhythmic gymnastics when she sees her idol, Diliana Georgieva, perform and win a contest of rhythmic gymnastics. Diliana proposes to train Hikari in Bulgaria, and Hikari accepts. She begins her training and joins her school's rhythmic gymnastics team.

At first Hikari lacks natural skill, but then she meets Takaaki Ooishi, a fellow gymnast and popular schoolmate who helps her to improve. With his support, Hikari's talent blossoms, landing her on the map of popularity along with the best rhythmic gymnast at her school, Hazuki Shiina.

As Hikari and Hazuki begin training for the World Cup competition together, a healthy rivalry develops. Hikari longs to embody Hazuki's graceful elegance, and seeks out Mao Natsukawa to help.

Mao is a childhood friend and the lead singer of a rock band, and he dreams of becoming a world-renowned rock'n'roll idol. Mao helps Hikari by creating music for her performances, and together they win the respect and admiration of the viewers who watch them perform.

Over the years, Mao has come to love Hikari deeply, but Hikari has fallen in love with Takaaki Ooishi. While this causes a rift in Hikari and Mao's relationship, he remains a loyal friend. When Hikari discovers that Hazuki also has feelings for Takaaki, they become rivals in sport and love. Hikari does not know how Takaaki feels about her, and worries Takaaki might fall for Hazuki because of her gymnastic talent. Hikari begins to perfect her skills, and is soon competing at the national and international level.

In the TV series, Hikari wins Ooishi's heart and we are shown a little flash forward: Hikari is an Olympic champion, Ooishi is recovering from a lesion but with Olympic expectations, Mao is working on his career as a musician and Hazuki has retired and is working with as a trainer for young children who want to be gymnasts.

=== The end in the manga version ===
Hikari goes on to win a national competition, giving her the opportunity to compete at the Seoul 1988 Summer Olympics. While Hikari has finally surpassed Hazuki in terms of ability as a rhythmic gymnast, their rivalry for Takaaki Ooishi's affection is still going strong.

When Hikari, Mao, Hazuki, Takaaki and rest of the athletes competing in the 1988 Summer Olympics travel to Seoul, Hikari finds out that Ooishi and Hazuki are in love and that they are set to be married. Hikari turns to Mao Natsukawa for support, but he becomes frustrated with her for ignoring his own love for her. When Mao leaves Hikari, she realizes that she has feelings for him, too. Even while he is not there to watch her compete, Hikari is determined to prove to Mao that he is an important part of her life and her success.

At the end of the manga, Hikari is competing at the 1988 Summer Olympics. While she is performing, Mao begins to sing an Italian love song, even though vocal music is banned during competitions. Despite this Hikari and Mao finish their performance, prompting applause from the crowd and their friends, Takaaki and Hazuki, who have come to see them perform. Before the winner is announced, both Hikari and Mao exit the competition arena. The manga concludes with Hikari smiling, hinting that in the end she may have not won a medal, but that she will have a bright future with Mao.

== Media ==
=== Manga ===
The manga was serialized in Japan in the weekly publication Margaret Magazine by Shueisha, with the first installment issued in February 1986. The manga series finished in 1988 collected in 16 small volumes. The manga series would at times contain parodies of famous 80s musicians that were popular of its publishing. For example: In the eighth volume of the manga series the author makes a parody of popular 80s singer Cyndi Lauper by drawing Hikari with the same hairstyle, skirt, and posture that the singer had on the She's So Unusual album cover. Recently in 2000 the manga series was reissued in Japan, collected in 8 volumes in bound tankōbon form, with less volumes, but with more chapters inside them and larger pages. The new reissued version of the manga also featured different covers from the original. These new covers feature a mixture of photos in black and white of rhythmic gymnasts performing, and black and white drawings of Hikari. The manga series was also released in Italy by Star Comics and serialized through Starlight (a publishing branch of Star Comics). Prior to the release of the manga in Italy, a Films comic version based on the TV series was made in the 80s was released in the country, but the images and dialogue were poor and not all the stories were covered, however it was appreciated by fans. The Italian version of the manga was titled "La leggenda di Hikari" (which literally means The Legend of Hikari) and collected in 16 small volumes with slightly altered covers from the original. Edizioni Star Comics re-released the manga series in Italy starting with the first volume released in May 2003 for the price of 3,10 Euro. The manga series was finished being released in 16 volumes in August 2004. The manga has yet to be released in Germany, France, and Spain, where the TV series was also very popular.

=== Anime ===
The anime series which was produced by Tatsunoko Production with Tomomi Mochizuki as head director originally aired on ABC from May 3, 1986, to September 20, 1986. It was aired on TV as another mainstream Saturday night anime series from 7:00-7:30 pm (19:00-19:30). The anime series was molded with information from the original story given by Izumi Aso, scripted with the participation of Hideki Sonoda, Mami Watanabe, Yasushi Hirano. While the anime had a lot to do with gymnastics it also had a good amount of music which was directed and arranged by Eiji Kawamura with lyrics from Goro Matsui who provided both opening and ending themes. Character Design was done by Michitaka Kikuchi, and Toyoko Hashimoto. Hisato Otaki was the art director. The Animation directors were Chuuichi Iguchi, Matsuri Okuda, Naoyuki Onda, Takayuki Goto, and Yumiko Suda. The Director of Photography was Kazunori Hashimoto and background artist was Kumiko Tada. All these people were assisted by Aso who was used as an adviser to maintain certain plot ideas and character development in the right direction.

==== Episode list ====
Like many popular manga series of the time (this is still done today), Legend of Light was turned into an anime series. At the time the producers of Tatsunoko Productions had picked the manga series to produce it into an anime series. It was first aired in Japan in early 1986. At the time the manga series was still unfinished so the producers of the anime were not sure how long the anime would last since the manga was not finished. Finally they settled at 26 episodes (the average number of episodes done per anime series, at the time highest number of episodes was 52). Due to poor ratings in Japan, the series was left unfinished at only 19 episodes with the last couple of episodes wrapping up the series in a hurry and left in an open ending in late 1986. The series was aired again abroad during the 1988 Olympics that were happening in Seoul, Korea in hopes that it would help boost the ratings of the anime series. Later on in 1988, the series was released in Europe where it was extremely successful, especially in France, Germany, Italy, and Spain. In every country where the series was released, the titles of the anime episodes were changed. The episode titles of the English version are translations of the original Japanese episodes titles.

==== Theme songs ====
#	Song title	Episodes	Notes
1	"Haato no kisetsu" (ハートの季節)	1-19	1986 - Japanese: Lyrics by Goro Matsui and arranged by Eiji Kawamura.; Music sung by Tsukasa Ito.; Translation: "Season Heart."
2	"Kataomoi no hamingo" (片思いのハミング)	1-19	1986 - Japanese: Lyrics by Goro Matsui and arranged by Eiji Kawamura.; Music sung by Tsukasa Ito.; Translation: "Humming of Unrequited Love."
3	"Hilary"	1-19	1988 - Italian: Performed by Cristina D'Avena.; Lyrics by Alessandra Valeri Manera.; Music by Carmelo 'Ninni' Carucci.
4	"Se stai con me"	n/a	1988 - Italian: Performed by Paola Tovaglia.; Lyrics by n/a.; Translation: "If you are with me".
5	"Il vento"	n/a	1988 - Italian: Performed by n/a.; Lyrics by n/a.; Translation: "The Wind".
6	"Quando tornerai"	n/a	1988 - Italian: Performed by n/a.; Lyrics by n/a.; Translation: "When you return".
7	"Cynthia ou le rythme de la vie"	1-19	1988 - French (translated from the original Italian song): Performed by Claude Lombard; Lyrics by Alessandra Valeri Manera (Adapted by Charles Level); Music by Carmelo 'Ninni' Carucci.
8	"Quand tu reviendras"	1-19	1988 - French: Performed by Jean-Claude Corbel; Translation: "When you return".
9	"le vent"	1-19	1988 - French: Performed by Jean-Claude Corbel; Lyrics and adaptation by Charles Level.; Translation: "The Wind".
10	"Si tu parles avec moi"	1-19	1988 - French: Performed by Claude Lombard; Lyrics and adaptation by Charles Level.; Translation: "If you speak with me".
11	"Piruetas"	1-19	1991 - Spanish (translated from the original Italian song): Performed by Sol Pilas; Lyrics by Alessandra Valeri Manera (Adapted by Carlos Toro); Music by Carmelo 'Ninni' Carucci
12	"Die kleinen Superstars"	1-19	1994 - German (translated from the original Italian song): Performed by Erika Bruhn; Lyrics by Alessandra Valeri Manera (Adapted into German language); Music by Carmelo 'Ninni' Carucci

==== VHS and DVD releases ====
System	Episodes	Discs or Cassettes	Features	
System	Episodes	Discs or Cassettes	Features	First released
VHS	16 - 18	1	Original German audio and credits; no options or extras	Germany: 1994
VHS	1 - 19	4	Original Italian audio and credits; No options or extras	Italy: Late August 2001
DVD	1 - 19	5	Original Japanese audio and credits; French subtitles	France: June 15, 2006
DVD	1 - 19	4	Original French audio and credits; Original Clip: Mister D	France: October 24, 2006

== Reception ==
In Japan, the manga series by Izumi Aso was very popular when it was beginning to be published by Shueisha and serialized through Margaret magazine in late 1985. This gave Aso the ability to continue the storyline for a long serialization. In mid-1986 Tatsunoko Productions picked up the series to turn it into an anime series in hopes to take advantage of the shōjo genre popularity in the mid-1980s. The anime, produced by Tatsunoko Productions was one of the few ventures of the company into the shōjo genre.

The anime was not very successful in Japan and it was taken off the air sooner than expected due to its low ratings in the country . (the anime series stalled at the count of only 19 episodes, as opposed to 26 episodes that had been planned by the producers). The manga series remained popular among loyal fans and continued to be serialized through Margaret magazine until Aso ended the series at 16 volumes.

The anime series would have probably never have been released outside Japan had not been for the 1988 Olympics which were to be held at Seoul, South Korea. The 1988 Olympics featured national rhythmic gymnastic competitions, and because of that the anime series was re-aired during the Olympics in 1988. During this time Tatsunoko Productions decided to release the series in Europe were rhythmic gymnastics is popular.

The anime series was criticized in Europe for its inability to properly show movement and for the fact that the rhythmic gymnastic performances were too short compare to real performances that can last for as far as five minutes.

== Hentai version ==
For a number of years during the late 1980s and 90s there have been rumors of a hentai version of Hikari no Densetsu. These rumors were proven to be untrue; there is no evidence that proves that there has been a hentai version of the anime series. However, there is an anime series that has parodied the Hikari no Densetsu series in the past (It is believed that this is where the rumors have come from). The anime series was parodied by Cream Lemon, an anthology OVA series from the mid and late 80s which is known for its emphasis on the story and its plot. In the second installment of the OVA series, the second episode called "White Shadow", it tells the story of an aspiring gymnast that resembles the character the anime character Hikari in design. The episode also contains two male characters that resemble Mao and Takaaki. This episode was mostly ignored by fans of the manga and anime series as a parody due to its lack of reference of the series and its poor quality, texture and design. The episode was released in the United States by Excalibur Films on both VHS and DVD with the alternate name "Black Widow" with other episodes of the Cream lemon series as part of a trilogy titled: "Pandora An Erotic Trilogy - Brothers Grime Adult Cartoon Volume 3." The episode was in English and uncensored.
