= Harukoi Otome =

2006 Japanese adult visual novel

- Harukoi Otome original game cover

春恋＊乙女
- Video game

Harukoi Otome: Otome no Sono de Gokigen'yō
- Developer: BaseSon
- Genre: Eroge, Visual novel, Romance
- Platform: Windows
- Released: January 27, 2006 (limited edition); December 14, 2007 (regular edition)
- Original video animation

Harukoi Otome: Otome no Sono de Aimashō
- Directed by: Katsuma Kanazawa
- Studio: Media Bank
- Released: April 18, 2008 – July 18, 2008
- Runtime: 30 minutes each
- Episodes: 2

Harukoi Otome: Otome no Sono de Gokigen'yō (春恋＊乙女 ～乙女の園でごきげんよう。～; lit. "Springtime Romance Maidens ~Greetings from the Maidens' Garden~") is a Japanese adult visual novel, developed by BaseSon and released on January 27, 2006. It is playable on Windows as a DVD.

The gameplay includes multiple scenarios with courses of interaction, and focuses on the appeal of the six female characters. Harukoi Otome is BaseSon's fourth title.

An adult anime adaptation entitled Harukoi Otome: Otome no Sono de Aimashō (春恋＊乙女 ～乙女の園で逢いましょう。～) was released in 2008.

== Story ==
Harukoi Otome revolves around protagonist Akihito Hayasaka, a male high-school sophomore. The school he attends (St. Francesca Academy (聖フランチェスカ学園, Sento Furanchesuka Gakuen)) used to be an all-girls school until it became unisex, and still has a high percentage of female students. Akihito's adopted younger sister (Umi Hayasaka) and his childhood friend (Yuika Serizawa) are also students there. Akihito meets many girls there, and becomes friends with them.

Kazuto Hongō (protagonist of BaseSon's fifth title, Koihime Musō) is also a student at St. Francesca; it is also the setting for the Koihime Musō OVA episode.

== Characters ==
=== Main characters ===
Akihito Hayasaka (早坂 章仁, Hayasaka Akihito)
Voiced by: Takahiro Mizushima (OVA)
Akihito (the protagonist) used to attend another school, named Takamiya Academy (鷹宮学園, Takamiya Gakuen), last year until it closed due to financial difficulties. He is one of the few male students in his class. His class (2-5) is also called "Soleil". In his childhood at the age of seven, he had a biological younger sister who was killed after getting hit by a car while playing at the park; after his sister's death he shut himself away from others until one day his parents adopted Umi who became his new sister.

Umi Hayasaka (早坂 羽未, Hayasaka Umi)
Voiced by: Yui Sakakibara (game/OVA)
Akihito's adopted younger sister and a first-year student, she gets along very well with her brother. She is an excellent student, and was admitted to St. Francesca on a scholarship. She is pretty and a little innocent but despite this, she loves watching horror films. Her class (1-3) is also called "Lyon".

Kisaya Fuyurugi (不動 如耶, Fuyurugi Kisaya)
Voiced by: Hitomi Nabatame (game/OVA)
Kisaya is a third-year student. She is student council president and captain of the kendo club, and is skilled in various other activities. Her father is the president of the Fuyurugi Zaibatsu (Fuyurugi Conglomerate). Her class (3-1) is also called "Rosa Eglanteria" or "Rosa Rubiginosa".

Yuika Serizawa (芹沢 結衣佳, Serizawa Yuika)
Voiced by: Yūko Gotō (game), Hiroko Taguchi (OVA)
Yuika is Akihito and Umi's childhood friend and classmate. She is a happy-go-lucky person, always smiling. She was Akihito's first love when they were both in junior high. She sits behind him in their classroom and belongs to the school's cooking club.

Sōnya Kiryū (桐生 ソーニャ, Kiryū Sōnya)
Voiced by: Yura Hinata (game/OVA)
Sōnya is one of Umi's classmates and her best friend. Her mother is Italian and her father Japanese. When she was little her father died in an accident and her mother went back to Italy, leaving Sōnya by herself in Japan. Sōnya was adopted by a Japanese woman named Mai Kiryū. Sōnya is a Christian and a novice nun.

Riru Orito (織戸 莉流, Orito Riru)
Voiced by: Akane Tomonaga (game/OVA)
Riru is Akihito's classmate. She is very strong-willed, and often quarrels with Akihito about little things. She sits next to him in class and belongs to the swim club. She also appears to harbor romantic feelings for Reika Matsuraba but they are unrequited. She ends up letting it go after a night with Akihito.

Ayaka Kusuhara (楠原 彩夏, Kusuhara Ayaka)
Voiced by: Nami Kurokawa (game/OVA)
Ayaka is a third-year student. She has heart problems, and sometimes needs to go to the hospital. Her class (3-4) is also called "Rosa Moscharta". Unlike most of the other students she does not live in a student dormitory, but lives alone in an apartment outside the school. She belongs to the school's art club.

=== Supporting characters ===
Tasuku Oikawa (及川 佑, Oikawa Tasuku)
Voiced by: Takamasa Ohashi (OVA)
Oikawa is a second-year student and Akihito's friend. He speaks in Kansai dialect. He later makes an appearance in Koihime Musou.

Natsuko Mikoshiba (御子柴 夏子, Mikoshiba Natsuko) and Fuyuko Araki (新城 冬子, Araki Fuyuko)
Voiced by: Mia Naruse (game) and Natsumi Yanase (game)
Natsuko and Fuyuko are girls in Akihito's class. They are interested in Akihito and Umi.

Reika Matsubara (松原 麗架, Matsubara Reika)
Voiced by: Hyo-sei (game/OVA)
Reika is Ayaka's friend and classmate. She is the captain of the swim club, and Riru looks up to her.

Yūki Arise (有瀬 悠季, Arise Yūki)
Voiced by: Mia Naruse (game/OVA)
Yūki is in Akihito's class. She also belongs to the swim club, and looks up to Reika. She and Reika have a lesbian relationship.

Satsuki Ōtori (鳳 皐月, Ōtori Satsuki)
Voiced by: Kanoko Hatamiya (game)
Satsuki, like Reika, is Ayaka's classmate and friend. She is their class representative and vice-president of the art club.

Ririka Mamiya (真宮 璃々香, Mamiya Ririka)
Voiced by: Kanoko Hatamiya (game)
Ririka is in Umi's class. She is distantly related to Kisaya, and looks up to her.

Chizuna Nagisawa (那岐沢 千砂, Nagisawa Chizuna)
Voiced by: Nami Kurokawa (game/OVA)
Chizuna is a server who works at Dawn Hall (黎明館, Reimeikan), the school cafeteria. Umi and Sōnya work part-time there as servers, too.

Chie Ōgami (大神 千絵, Ōgami Chie)
Voiced by: Hitomi (voice actress) (game)
Ōgami is Akihito's homeroom teacher; she is also in charge of Japanese literature lessons.

Mai Kiryū (桐生 舞衣, Kiryū Mai)
Voiced by: Hitomi (voice actress) (game)
Mai is a nun, who works at the school chapel. She is Sōnya's foster mother, and matron of the girls' dorm.

Tetsuya Ryūzenji (竜禅寺 徹哉, Ryūzenji Tetsuya)
Ryūzenji is St. Francesca Academy's doctor. He is short and boyish.

Hirotsugu Ennokōji (越小路 博嗣, Ennokōji Hirotsugu)
Hirotsugu is Kisaya's fiancé, and a son of the distinguished Ennokōji family. He has a snobbish attitude, always looking down on others, and is not a St. Francesca Academy student.

== Development and release ==
The characters were designed by Hinata Katagiri and Kishinisen. The scenario was written by Takuya Aoyama, K. Baggio, Shōta Onoue, and Hozumi Nakamoto. The music was composed by Loser Koshiwagi, Torapon, and Bjoern. Hinata Katagiri, K.Baggio, and Shōta Onoue also participated in the development of Koihime Musō.

Harukoi Otome was first released as a limited-edition version for Windows on January 27, 2006. A regular edition followed on December 14, 2007. The game was also adapted into mobile-phone games by Magicseed and Masys.

MangaGamer plans to release an English translation of the game titled Harukoi Otome: Greetings from the Maidens' Garden in 2013.

== Music and audio CD ==
Harukoi Otome's opening theme is "Seishun Ōka" (青春＊桜歌; "Adolescence Cherry Blossom Song") (sung by Rita), and the theme song is "Harukoi" (春恋; "Springtime Romance") by H?m?. The game's original soundtrack was released by BaseSon on December 14, 2007, with 31 tracks. The soundtrack was also included in the regular edition of the game, released on the same day.

== Original video animation (OVA) ==
Harukoi Otome was adapted into a hentai OVA series entitled Harukoi Otome: Otome no Sono de Aimashō (春恋＊乙女 ～乙女の園で逢いましょう。～). It was produced by animation studio Media Bank, and directed by Katsuma Kanazawa. The first volume was released on April 18, 2008; the second volume was released on July 18. The first volume concerns Kisaya and Yuika; the second volume is about Riru and Umi.
