= List of Nanatsuiro Drops episodes =

This is a list of episodes for the Japanese anime series Nanatsuiro Drops. The anime was produced by Studio Barcelona, and aired in Japan on Chiba TV between July 3, 2007, and September 30, 2007, containing twelve episodes.

== Episodes ==
No.	Title	Original release date
1	"What color is Destiny?"; Transliteration: "Unmei wa Nani-iro?" (Japanese: 運命はなにいろ?)	July 8, 2007
Introduction to the story, and characters. Masaharu, a loner student, is splashed by Sumomo and inducted into the gardening club. He bumps into Arthur (disguised with a mask) thus beginning his problems. (he drinks a magic juice, thinking it was his soda. But the juice turns him into a stuffed animal lamb). In order to turn back to normal, he must find his 'chosen girl.' Sumomo ends up as his "chosen girl," and began their adventure to capture the seven stardrops he must find in order to change back to normal. They capture their first stardrop.
2	"Hydrangea-colored Memories"; Transliteration: "Ajisai-iro no Kioku" (Japanese: あじさい色の記憶)	July 15, 2007
This episode starts with Masaharu waking up from Sumomo's bed, this also reveals how the moon affects Masaharu's doll form. following this, they captured a second stardrop but are accidentally seen by Sumomo's friend Nadeshiko, which forces them to have to potentially erase her memories. But in the end, Masaharu finds out about a spell that allows Nadeshiko to retain her memories with the caveat (or a warning/caution) that this allowance can only be made once. And it only works if the caster and the person being cast upon, only truly trust each other. They do, of course, and everything works out perfectly fine.
3	"Gold-colored Wishing Star"; Transliteration: "Kin-iro Negai-boshi" (Japanese: 金いろ願い星)	July 22, 2007
It is the festival day of Tanabata and the group must help prepare for it. Nona Yūki, amazingly another Steller Spinner, and Arthur Matsuda, her servant, are introduced in this episode. Sumomo also displays her uncanny ability to learn spells by simply observing them once.
4	"Summer-colored Pool Side"; Transliteration: "Natsu-iro no Pūrusaido" (Japanese: 夏色のプールサイド)	August 5, 2007
Nona Yūki transfers to the school for unknown reasons, and Sumomo's fear of swimming is revealed. The latest stardrop falls into the water and Sumomo is too scared to go inside, Nona teaches her a spell to freeze and go underwater. Due to the frozen state of the water, she manages to overcome her phobia with Masaharu in his doll form. Also reveals Nadeshiko's observation abilities which reveals Nona in her Stellar Spinner form.
5	"Exciting-colored Starlit Sky"; Transliteration: "Tokimeki-iro no Hoshizora" (Japanese: ときめき色の星空)	August 12, 2007
The group goes to the beach for vacation and then rests in a camp. The group makes curry and this shows Nona's lack of knowledge of washing rice. Masaharu turns into his doll form and while en route to Sumomo gets dirty. Despite his protests, Sumomo bathes him with all the other girls. He fears to turn back into human but does not; he faints moments later. Soon the scene switches to the girls cabin as they attempt to host a pajama party but they are eventually caught by their teacher, Natsume Kisaragi. The next night Masaharu and Nona are paired up in the trial of courage and Sumomo begins to think that Masaharu loves Nona.
6	"Tender-colored Sunset"; Transliteration: "Yasashisa-iro no Yuuyake" (Japanese: やさしさいろの夕焼け)	August 19, 2007
Starts with a flashback showing how Masaharu helps Sumomo go to her class. Sumomo falls in love with him after that day. Masaharu thinks Sumomo loves Natsume-sensei. Soon they meet up in the greenhouse to ask but the group arrive to help out. Later that night he transform and decides to talk to her via that form despite feeling guilty at the thought. She tells him that she loved Masaharu since that day. A stardrop came and the couple arrives only for Nona to challenge them. During the fight she uses a freezing spell which her mother used but despite that she loses the duel and cries, none on the other hand despite winning she feels a sense of defeat. Masaharu learns that the quality of a spell depends on the emotions of the stellar speller and due to this he confesses his love for Sumomo at the greenhouse.
7	"Honey-colored Bewilderment"; Transliteration: "Hachimitsu-iro no Tomadoi" (Japanese: はちみつ色のとまどい)	August 26, 2007
Masaharu makes his not-so-shocking confession and things are very awkward for the two for days afterward. Nona investigates how Sumomo was able to use the freezing spell in their last duel and reads book after book. She discovers that the last genius (and the only one of her time) who was able to use the spell was Karin-sama- who happens to be the one whom Nona's admired since she was a child. Karin was a legendary Steller Spinner, the 'youngest ever genius girl who surpassed everyone. 18 years before this story, he came to Retoroushe to collect the stardrops, but she never returned. Masaharu wants to see Sumomo again to find out her feeling for him in person. Their teacher, Natsume-sensei, is revealed to be Sumomo's uncle. Nona talks to Natsume-sensei and she finds out Karin-sama is Sumomo's mother, But Sumomo doesn't know her mother was a Stellar Spinner. Sumomo takes a walk with her father and, after a talk, she decides to go back to school, saying she has something she has to do. She sends a message to Masaharu, saying to meet them in 'their special place.' He has his phone off though, thus he receives it 2 hours late. He rushes off to the garden where she's waiting. He confesses again and waits for her reply. She says that she loves him too and they plant a lost bulb together.
8	"Happiness-colored Wings"; Transliteration: "Shiawase-iro no Tsubasa" (Japanese: 幸せいろの翼)	September 2, 2007
Masaharu and Sumomo starts the day with a "Good Morning" on the corridor, with their friends mentioning them as a troublesome couple. While Nona is spending almost all her time researching about Sumomo's mother and other things about Stellar Spinners, Sumomo, with the suggestion of their friends, sets a date with Masaharu. Sumomo then fantasized about their date, and even kissed Yuki-chan (Masaharu's stuffed animal form) before Yuki-chan went home. During the date, both of them are still awkward with each other (which was to be expected, considering this to be their first ever date, after all). They never kissed on their date (disappointing their peers) but was able to do so on the greenhouse. Later, Sumomo dueled once again with Nona, capturing a high-level stardrop (there were actually two). The results were a total defeat to Nona, with Sumomo learning two recipes in one night.
9	"Sad color is Sand beige" Transliteration: "Kanashimi-iro wa Sandobēju" (Japanese: かなしみ色はサンドベージュ)	September 9, 2007
Sumomo was seen here learning a transformation spell and capturing her sixth stardrop. Upon returning home, she was struck by the thought that, when she has finished collecting all seven stardrops, Yuki-chan will be returning to the "Land of Stuffed Animals", thus leaving her. The next day, Masaharu considered telling Sumomo the truth about him and Yuki-chan, but Kisaragi-sensei forbid him not to, and made a dire warning to him. Sumomo greeted Masaharu, calling him by his first name (to the shock of their friends). Their friends then pestered him into also calling Sumomo by her first name. Nona, depressed by the fact that Sumomo has used a recipe she had never seen before, practiced doing the recipe herself. She challenged Sumomo to a duel to capture stardrops (she has released hers) when Sumomo, Masaharu and Nadeshiko came to visit her. During the duel, Nona's ladle went out of control because of the recipe she has used multiple times. Knowing the danger Sumomo is into, Masaharu, despite Nadeshiko's intrusion, came to Sumomo's aid, as Yuki-chan has always did. Sumomo then realized that Masaharu is actually Yuki-chan. Because of this revelation, Kisaragi-sensei's warning, that Masaharu will become a stuffed animal forever, came into realization.
10	"Silver-colored Full moon" Transliteration: "Gin-iro no Mangetsu" (Japanese: ぎんいろの満月)	September 16, 2007
Masaharu, now an ordinary stuffed toy lamb not capable of speech, is brought to Kisaragi-sensei by Sumomo and Nadeshiko. As Kisaragi-sensei covered up Masaharu's situation to the entire class, Nona blamed herself for what happened. Nadeshiko confronted her and told her that it wasn't her fault, reassuring her that Sumomo never blamed her for anything. In search for a solution, Kisaragi-sensei discovered a recipe that could help them. But the recipe was found to be very difficult to use, so they decided to perform it on a full moon (when, as Kisaragi-sensei mentioned, Figurare's powers could be used to its fullest). Nights before the full moon, Sumomo practiced using the recipe on some plants on the greenhouse, with Nadeshiko accompanying her. Meanwhile, Nona practiced cooking as a kind of help for Sumomo. Exhaustion soon struck Sumomo, and she collapsed on the room where Kisaragi-sensei has been keeping Masaharu. After dreaming some flashbacks, she found and ate the bento box made for her by Nona. Later on the school grounds, she performed the recipe to change Masaharu back, but went almost out of control even after being amplified by Kisaragi-sensei. Luckily, Nona (as well as another surprise character) came to her aid, and they were able to bring back Masaharu.
11	"Tear-colored Decision"; Transliteration: "Namida-iro no Kesshin" (Japanese: なみだ色の決心)	September 23, 2007
Following the previous episode, Kisaragi-sensei immediately asked Masaharu for the current month, with Masaharu answering incorrectly. This indicated that Masaharu's memory have been jumbled, as an effect of him being exposed to Figurare magic too much, and its dire effect would be Masaharu losing his memory of being Yuki-chan, and all that has happened between him and Sumomo after drinking the antidote which would return him to normal. With the last stardrop appearing, Masaharu finally tells Sumomo the truth about him losing his memory. They spent the time on a date while waiting for the stardrop, with Masaharu promising to love Sumomo once again.
12	"The First Love is Seven-colored"; Transliteration: "Hatsukoi wa Nanatsu-iro" (Japanese: 初恋はななついろ)	September 30, 2007
With Masaharu's memory on a half-year reset, his life returns to how it was before. Sumomo, now feeling depressed, is visited on the Gardening club by Masaharu, who, moments later, gave Sumomo her bandage after she gets injured from the sprinkler (the same bandage Sumomo gave to Masaharu on their first date). Later, she is encouraged by Nona, who then offered a medicine (made from the stardrops she had collected) to restore Masaharu's memory. Sumomo, however, decides not to use the medicine, and clings to the promise she and Masaharu had made. Meanwhile, Masaharu wanders around town visiting the places where he and Sumomo had spent time together (probably in an attempt to remember something). After going to the merry-go-round and vivid flashbacks, he returns to the school greenhouse. Masaharu finds Sumomo on the secret place Sumomo had shown him. Though having no recollection of previous events, Masaharu tells Sumomo he will love her once again, hence fulfilling their promise.

== Broadcasting stations ==
Broadcasting station	Network	Term	Time
Chiba TV	Independent	July 3, 2007 - September 18, 2007	1:40 - 2:10
TV Kanagawa	Independent	July 3, 2007 - September 18, 2007	2:15 - 2:45
Teletama	Independent	July 3, 2007 - September 18, 2007	2:30 - 3:00
TV Hokkaido	TXN	July 4, 2007 - September 19, 2007	3:00 - 3:30
CBC	JNN	July 6, 2007 - September 21, 2007	3:25 - 3:55
TVQ	TXN	July 6, 2007 - September 21, 2007	3:48 - 4:18
TV Setouchi	TXN	July 7, 2007 - September 22, 2007	2:58 - 3:28
MBS (organizer)	JNN	July 8, 2007 - September 30, 2007	2:55 - 3:25
AT-X	CS	September 19, 2007 -	11:00 - 11:30
