= Feena =

Feena may refer to:

- Feena (Grandia), a character in the video game Grandia
- Feena, a character in the video game Ys I & II
- Feena Fam Earthlight, a character in the visual novel Yoake Mae yori Ruriiro na
