= Nami Kurokawa =

Japanese voice actress

- 黒河 奈美
- Born: January 25, 1980 (age 46); Osaka, Japan
- Occupation: Voice actress
- Agent: Production Baobab

Nami Kurokawa (黒河 奈美, Kurokawa Nami; born January 25, 1980) is a Japanese voice actress and singer from Osaka Prefecture. She is known for portraying Tamaki Konomiya in Da Capo, Leica Crusade in Demonbane, Flora Koiwai in Nanatsuiro Drops, Kan'u Unchō in Koihime Musō, Sayaka Hozumi in Yoake Mae yori Ruriiro na, and Takako Kakuzawa in Gakuen Utopia Manabi Straight!.

== Biography ==
Nami Kurokawa, a native of Osaka Prefecture, was born on January 25, 1980. As a kindergarten student, her initial dream was to be a Japanese idol. However, as she got older, she became more shy and started considering an acting career, and afterwards, she wanted to become an announcer, and in particular a career in "communicating something through words". While considering her career after her high school graduation, she learned about a voice acting school that was recruiting for its first batch of students through an anime magazine that her mother had bought, and she subsequently enrolled there. She graduated from the Amusement Media Academy Department in 2000, and she made her voice acting debut in 2001 as Mamoru Sanjōji in Dennō Bōkenki Webdiver.

She has starred as Kan'u Unchō in the Koihime Musō franchise. She has voiced the character in all three anime adaptations and in several of the video games. She was also part of Momozono no Sanshimai, a voice acting unit who sang "Otome Ryouran Battle Party", the ending theme song of the 2009 anime adaptation Shin Koihime Musō.

She has appeared as Tamaki Konomiya in the Da Capo franchise, appearing in the anime adaptation and the games D.C.P.S. (2003) and Da Capo: Four Seasons (2005). She has starred as Leica Crusade in the Demonbane franchise, appearing in the 2006 anime Kishin Houkou Demonbane and the franchise's three video games. She has starred as Flora Koiwai in the Nanatsuiro Drops franchise, appearing in the 2006 original visual novel, its 2007 PlayStation 2 port, and the 2007 anime adaptation. She has starred as Sayaka Hozumi in the Yoake Mae yori Ruriiro na franchise, appearing in the anime adaptation Crescent Love (2006) and four of the video games. She has starred as Takako Kakuzawa in Gakuen Utopia Manabi Straight! (2007) and its video game adaptation Gakuen Utopia Manabi Straight! Kirakira Happy Festa!.

Her adult visual novel credits include including Ayaka Kusuhara in Harukoi Otome (2006), Yumiko Kamiazuma in Tōka Gettan (2007), Tsukasa Kiryu in Akaneiro ni Somaru Saka (2007), Haruka Kawasumi in Time Leap (2007), Misaki Ayase in Sakura Strasse (2008), Chie Ashikaga in Cross Days (2010), Makiyo Shingyouji in Otome wa Boku ni Koishiteru (2010), Shiori Sasaki in In Search of the Lost Future (2010), Sophia Measley in 11eyes: Resona Forma (2011), and Musashibō Benkei in Maji de Watashi ni Koi Shinasai! S (2012). Her anime credits include Miyuki Sawamura in D.N.Angel, Aya Kanazawa in The World of Narue, Gabriela Babi Bozzo in Ginban Kaleidoscope, Koshiba in High School Girls, Megumi Shōji in La Corda d'Oro, Miharu Asano in Mushi-Uta, and Mutsumi Sendou in The Qwaser of Stigmata. Her video game credits include Olivia in Growlanser II: The Sense of Justice (2001), Ayano Sakurazaka in Raw Danger! (2006), Carol in Everybody's Tennis (2006), Rami in Summon Night 4 (2006), Meno Lou and Francisca in Armored Core 4 (2006), Chelinka in Final Fantasy Crystal Chronicles: Ring of Fates (2007), Scheherazade and Kamikirimusi in Soulcalibur IV (2008), and Emma Crawford in R-Type Tactics II: Operation Bitter Chocolate (2009).

== Filmography ==
=== Anime ===
2001

- Dennō Bōkenki Webdiver, Mamoru Sanjōji

2002

- Shrine of the Morning Mist, daughter (episode 18)

2003

- D.N.Angel, Miyuki Sawamura
- The World of Narue, Aya Kanazawa, emcee (episode 10), others

2004

- Hanaukyo Maid Team: La Veritae, Cynthia's mom, Medical Department maid

2005

- Akahori Gedou Hour Rabuge, female announcer, Hiroko
- Bludgeoning Angel Dokuro-chan, Tanabe-san, Tamiya-san (ep 5), Yuuko-sensei (ep 6,7)
- Da Capo Second Season, Tamaki Konomiya
- Ginban Kaleidoscope, Gabriela Babi Bozzo

2006

- High School Girls, Koshiba
- Kashimashi: Girl Meets Girl, girl, woman B (episode 2, 3)
- Kishin Houkou Demonbane, Leica Crusade
- La Corda d'Oro, Megumi Shōji
- The Good Witch of the West: Astraea Testament, literature club member (episode 4), woman A (episode 5)
- Yoake Mae yori Ruriiro na: Crescent Love, Sayaka Hozumi

2007

- Bludgeoning Angel Dokuro-chan 2, Tanabe-san
- Gakuen Utopia Manabi Straight!, Takako Kakuzawa
- Mushi-Uta, Miharu Asano
- Nanatsuiro Drops, Flora Koiwai

2008

- Hakken Taiken Daisuki! Shimajirō, Nikkun, Sabukun
- Koihime Musō, Kan'u Unchō/Aisha

2009

- Shin Koihime Musō, Kan'u

2010

- Chu-Bra!!, camera operator
- Shin Koihime Musō: Otome Tairan, Kan'u
- The Qwaser of Stigmata, Mutsumi Sendou

=== Video games ===
2001

- Growlanser II: The Sense of Justice, Olivia

2002

- Disaster Report, radio announcer

2003

- D.C.P.S., Tamaki Konomiya
- My Merry May, Tae Kitsuki
- Zanma Taisei Demonbane, Leica Crusade

2004

- Kishin Houkou Demonbane, Leica Crusade
- Kokoro no Tobira, Yukina Sakura

2005

- Da Capo: Four Seasons, Tamaki Konomiya
- Gift, Minagi Nonomura, Mrs. Fujimiya, Jinta
- My Merry May With Be, Tae Kitsuki
- Yoake Mae yori Ruriiro na, Sayaka Hozumi

2006

- Armored Core 4, Meno Lou, Francisca
- Everybody's Tennis, Carol
- Gift: Nijiiro Stories, Jinta, Minagi Nonomura, Mrs. Fujimiya, Bā-san (as Mina Motoyama)
- Harukoi Otome, Ayaka Kusuhara
- Kishin Hishou Demonbane, Leica Crusade
- Nanatsuiro Drops, Flora Koiwai
- Raw Danger!, Ayano Sakurazaka
- Summon Night 4, Rami
- Yoake Mae yori Ruriiro na: Brighter Than Dawning Blue, Sayaka Hozumi

2007

- Akaneiro ni Somaru Saka, Tsukasa Kiryu (as Mina Motoyama)
- Final Fantasy Crystal Chronicles: Ring of Fates, Chelinka
- Gakuen Utopia Manabi Straight! Kirakira Happy Festa!, Takako Kakuzawa
- Koihime Musō: Doki Otome Darake no Sangokushi Engi, Kan'u
- Nanatsuiro Drops Pure!!, Flora Koiwai
- Time Leap, Haruka Kawasumi (as Mina Motoyama)
- Tōka Gettan, Yumiko Kamiazuma (as Mina Motoyama)
- Wild Arms XF as Alexia Lynn Elesius

2008

- Sakura Strasse, Misaki Ayase (as Mina Motoyama)
- Sakuranbo Strasse, Misaki Ayase (as Mina Motoyama)
- Shin Koihime Musō: Otome Tairan, Kan'u (as Mina Motoyama)
- Soulcalibur IV, Scheherazade, Kamikirimusi

2009

- R-Type Tactics II: Operation Bitter Chocolate, Emma Crawford
- Time Leap, Haruka Kawasumi
- Time Leap Paradise, Haruka Kawasumi (as Mina Motoyama)
- Yoake Mae yori Ruriiro na: Moonlight Cradle, Sayaka Hozumi (as Mina Motoyama)

2010

- Cross Days, Chie Ashikaga (as Mina Motoyama)
- In Search of the Lost Future, Shiori Sasaki (as Mina Motoyama)
- Otome wa Boku ni Koishiteru, Makiyo Shingyouji (as Mina Motoyama)
- Shin Koihime Musō: Moe Shōden, Kan'u (as Mina Motoyama)
- Yoake Mae yori Ruriiro na Portable, Sayaka Hozumi

2011

- 11eyes: Resona Forma, Sophia Measley (as Mina Motoyama)
- Otome wa Boku ni Koishiteru Portable, Makiyo Shingyouji

2012

- Maji de Watashi ni Koi Shinasai! S, Musashibō Benkei (as Mina Motoyama)
- Prismatic Princess Unison Stars, Flora Koiwai (as Mina Motoyama)

2015

- Shin Koihime Eiyūtan 3: Otome Enran: Sangokushi Engi, Kan'u (as Mina Motoyama)

2016

- Koihime Enbu, Kan'u

2019

- Shin Koihime Musō – Kakumei: Ryū-ki no Taimou, Kan'u (as Mina Motoyama)

=== Dubbing ===
- Beyond the Sea (2004) as Sandra Dee (Kate Bosworth)
- Wrong Turn 4: Bloody Beginnings (2011) as Bridget (Kaitlyn Wong)
