= Hitomi Nabatame =

Japanese voice actress (born 1976)

- 生天目 仁美
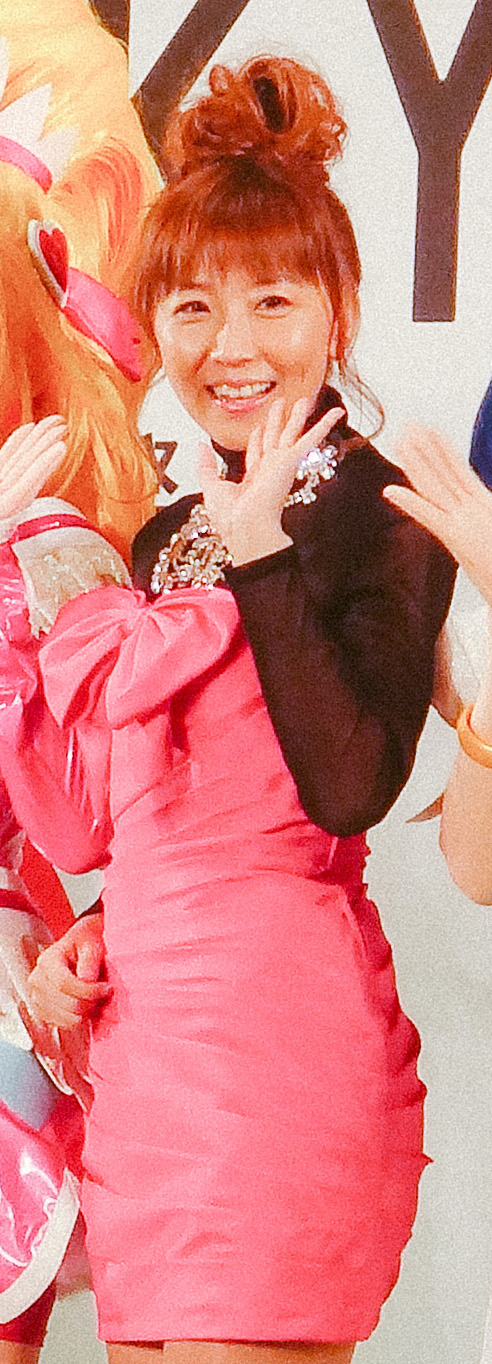
- Nabatame at the 26th Tokyo International Film Festival on October 17, 2013
- Born: August 4, 1976 (age 50); Sado, Niigata, Japan
- Occupations: Actress; voice actress; singer
- Years active: 1998–present
- Agent: Ken Production
- Notable work: (Lunar Legend) Tsukihime as Arcueid Brunestud; Ikki Tousen as Uncho Kan'u; DokiDoki! PreCure as Mana Aida/Cure Heart; Bleach as Nanao Ise; Land of the Lustrous as Sphene; Sword Art Online: Alicization/Sword Art Online: Alicization - War of Underworld as Fanatio/Fanatio Synthesis Two; Date A Live as Nia Honjou; White Album 2 as Kazusa Touma; Rin-ne as Rokumon; Strawberry Panic! as Shizuma Hanazono; Oreimo as Saori Makishima; Honkai: Star Rail as Black Swan; You and Me and Her: A Love Story as Miyuki Sone

Hitomi Nabatame (生天目 仁美, Nabatame Hitomi; born August 4, 1976) is a Japanese actress and singer who is affiliated with Ken Production. She sang the opening themes for Nogizaka Haruka no Himitsu under the name "Miran Himemiya and Chocolate Rockers".

== Filmography ==
=== Anime ===
2003

- Maburaho (Yūna Miyama)
- Shingetsutan Tsukihime (Arcueid Brunestud)

2004

- Maria Watches Over Us (Eriko Torii)
- Daphne in the Brilliant Blue (May)
- Futari wa Pretty Cure (Yumiko Nakagawa)
- Mirmo Zibang! (Cameri)
- Gantz (Kei Kishimoto)
- Maria Watches Over Us Season 2: Printemps (Eriko Torii)
- Ninja Nonsense (Kunoichi)
- School Rumble (Mikoto Suou)
- Uta∽Kata (Izumi Tachibana)
- Rockman.EXE Stream (Route)
- Zoids Fuzors (Betty)
- Desert Punk (Mariko)
- Tactics (Shino)
- Bleach (Misato Ochi, Nanao Ise, Ryō Kunieda)

2005

- Pani Poni Dash! (Misao Nanjo)
- Trinity Blood (Kate Scott)
- Starship Operators (Dita Mirkob)
- Ultimate Girls (Vivienne Ohtori)
- Glass Mask (Cordelia)
- Best Student Council (Kanade Jinguji)
- Honey and Clover (Chouko)
- Canvas 2 - Niji Iro no Sketch (Kiri Kikyou)
- ToHeart2 (Yuma Tonami)
- Hell Girl (Ayumi Shibata)
- Shakugan no Shana (Margery Daw)
- Solty Rei (Am Toranfa)
- Strawberry Marshmallow (Nobue Itō)

2006

- School Rumble: 2nd Semester (Mikoto Suou)
- Renkin 3-kyuu Magical? Pokahn (Liru)
- Strawberry Panic! (Shizuma Hanazono)
- Girl's High (Eriko Takahashi)
- Ray (Rei)
- The Third: The Girl with the Blue Eye (Rona Fauna)
- Coyote Ragtime Show (April)
- Ramen Fighter Miki (Miki Onimaru)
- Mamotte! Lollipop (Nina Yamada)
- Buso Renkin (Ouka Hayasaka)
- Brighter than the Dawning Blue (Feena Fam Earthlight)
- Venus to Mamoru (Maria)

2007

- Nodame Cantabile (Saiko Tagaya)
- Rocket Girls (Matsuri)
- Ikki-Tousen: Dragon Destiny (Unchou Kan'u)
- Hayate the Combat Butler (Yukiji Katsura)
- Gegege no Kitarō (Minori)
- Nagasarete Airantou (Mei Mei)
- Big Windup! (Momoko)
- Kenko Zenrakei Suieibu Umisho (Momoko Orizuka)
- Mushi-Uta (Rina Tachibana)
- Sky Girls (Dr. Aki Yuko)
- Shakugan no Shana Second (Margery Daw)
- Prism Ark (Kagura, Comet, Meto)

2008

- Yatterman (Tetsuto)
- RIN - Daughters of Mnemosyne (Ruon Kamiyama)
- Blassreiter (Sasha)
- Blue Dragon: Trials of the Seven Shadows (Noi)
- Nabari no Ou (Catalina Toudou)
- Psychic Squad (Sera)
- S · A: Special A (Akira Tōdō)
- Ikki Tousen: Great Guardians (Unchou Kan'u)
- Sekirei (Uzume)
- Ryoko's Case File (Ryōko Yakushiji)
- Nogizaka Haruka no Himitsu (Ruko Ayase)
- Skip Beat! (Itsumi Momose)
- Magician's Academy (Miyabi)
- Chaos;Head (Sena Aoi)

2009

- Maria Watches Over Us 4th Season (Eriko Torii, Nana Arima)
- Samurai Harem (Angela Takatsukasa)
- Queen's Blade: The Exiled Virgin (Shizuka)
- Hayate the Combat Butler!! (Yukiji Katsura)
- Polyphonica Crimson S (Elaine)
- Natsu no Arashi! (Master/Sayaka)
- Modern Magic Made Simple (Misa Anehara)
- Queen's Blade 2: The Evil Eye (Shizuka)
- A Certain Scientific Railgun (Dorm Supervisor)
- Letter Bee (Nelli)
- Natsu no Arashi! Akinai-chū (Master/Sayaka)
- Nogizaka Haruka no Himitsu: Purezza (Ruko Ayase, Milan Himemiya)
- Darker than Black: Gemini of the Meteor (Rikako)
- Tamagotchi! (Clara Queen)

2010

- Ikki Tōsen: Xtreme Xecutor (Unchō Kan'u)
- Hime Chen! Otogi Chikku Idol Lilpri (Otohime)
- Mayoi Neko Overrun! (Honoka's mother)
- Ōkami-san & Her Seven Companions (Yukime Murano)
- Sekirei: Pure Engagement (Uzume)
- Panty & Stocking with Garterbelt (Wife Petter)
- Psychic Detective Yakumo (Mao Arai)
- Oreimo (Saori Makishima)
- Squid Girl (Cindy Campbell)
- Fortune Arterial: Akai Yakusoku (Yuuki Kanade)

2011

- Cardfight!! Vanguard (Asaka Narumi)
- Beelzebub (Torii)
- 30-sai no Hoken Taiiku (Wada-san)
- Astarotte's Toy (Judit Snorrevík)
- Heaven's Memo Pad (Min-san)
- Natsume's Book of Friends (Yōkai Possessing Tanuma)
- Squid Girl Season 2 (Cindy Campbell)
- Persona 4: The Animation (Noriko Kashiwagi)
- Shakugan no Shana III (Margery Daw)

2012

- Tantei Opera Milky Holmes Dai-Ni-Maku (Higgs)
- High School DxD (Raynare/Yūma Amano)
- Kuromajo-san ga Toru!! (Ryōtarō Asakura)
- Is This a Zombie? of the Dead (Chris)
- Sengoku Collection (Yamaguchi)
- Place to Place (Mayoi Katase)
- Muv-Luv Alternative: Total Eclipse (Cryska Barchenowa)
- The Ambition of Oda Nobuna (Shibata Katsuie)
- Hayate the Combat Butler: Can't Take My Eyes Off You (Yukiji Katsura)
- Hidamari Sketch × Honeycomb (Andō)
- Girls und Panzer (Erika Itsumi)

2013

- Dokidoki! Precure (Mana Aida / Cure Heart)
- Oreimo 2 (Saori Makishima)
- Danchi Tomoo (Mitsuo Kikugawa)
- Hayate the Combat Butler! Cuties (Yukiji Katsura)
- A Certain Scientific Railgun S (Tokiwadai Dorm Supervisor)
- White Album 2 (Kazusa Touma)
- Walkure Romanze (Akane Ryūzōji)
- Pocket Monsters: XY (Saki, Citron's Harimaron)

2014

- Nisekoi (Kyoko)
- Akame ga Kill! (Nyau)
- Black Bullet (Shiina Kazumi)
- Rail Wars! (Sakura Kadota)
- Fate/kaleid liner Prisma Illya (Bazett Fraga McRemitz)
- Invaders of the Rokujyōma!? (Broadcasting Committee Member)

2015

- Aldnoah.Zero 2 (Rafia)
- Rin-ne (Rokumon)
- Etotama (Shaa-tan)
- Fate/kaleid liner Prisma Illya 2wei Herz! (Bazett Fraga McRemitz)
- Sore ga Seiyū! (Hikari Shiodome)
- Nisekoi (Kyoko)
- High School DxD BorN (Raynare)
- Nisekoi: (Kyoko)
- Fate/kaleid liner Prisma Illya 2wei Herz! (Bazett Fraga McRemitz)
- Pocket Monsters: XY&Z (Citron's Harimaron)

2016

- Ooya-san wa Shishunki! (Reiko Shirai)
- Aokana: Four Rhythm Across the Blue (Botan Arisaka)
- Rin-ne 2 (Rokumon)
- Kono Subarashii Sekai ni Shukufuku o! (Sena / Chomusuke)
- Haven't You Heard? I'm Sakamoto (Yagi)
- Haruchika (Minami Kamijō)
- Mobile Suit Gundam: Iron-Blooded Orphans (Yamazin Toker)

2017

- Chaos;Child (Aoi Sena)
- Saekano: How to Raise a Boring Girlfriend Flat (Akane Kosaka)
- Is It Wrong to Try to Pick Up Girls in a Dungeon? On the Side (Tsubaki Collbrande)
- Eromanga Sensei (Saori Bajiina)
- Made in Abyss (Laffi)
- Land of the Lustrous (Sphene)
- Two Car (Hatsune Wada)
- Dies irae (Isaak, Rea Himuro)
- My Hero Academia (Setsuna Tokage)

2018

- Kokkoku (Sanae Yukawa)
- Junji Ito Collection (Soga)
- Dragon Pilot: Hisone and Masotan (Eiko Akishima)
- Free! -Dive to the Future- (Akane Kurimiya-Shiina)
- Revue Starlight (Middle School Teacher)

2019

- Circlet Princess (Reina Kuroda)
- Sword Art Online: Alicization (Fanatio)
- Fruits Basket (Mayuko Shiraki)
- Why the Hell are You Here, Teacher!? (Saki Satô)
- Demon Lord, Retry! (Mikan)
- Vinland Saga (Ylva)
- Astra Lost in Space (Paulina Levinskaya)

2020

- Isekai Quartet 2 (Chomusuke)
- Princess Connect! Re:Dive (Shizuru / Shizuru Hoshino)
- Tower of God (Serena Rinnen)
- Boruto: Naruto Next Generations (Victor's Secretary)

2021

- The World Ends with You the Animation (Mitsuki Konishi)
- Everything for Demon King Evelogia (Tishia)
- Mieruko-chan (Tōko Yotsuya)

2022

- Princess Connect! Re:Dive Season 2 (Shizuru / Shizuru Hoshino)
- Tokyo 24th Ward (Sakiko Tsuzuragawa)
- Girls' Frontline (Agent)
- Date A Live IV (Nia Honjō)
- Bleach: Thousand-Year Blood War (Nanao Ise)
- Shin Ikki Tousen (Unchō Kan'u)

2023

- KonoSuba: An Explosion on This Wonderful World! (Chomusuke)
- Sweet Reincarnation (Agnes Mille Morteln)
- Undead Girl Murder Farce (Alma)
- My Daughter Left the Nest and Returned an S-Rank Adventurer (Maria)
- Classroom for Heroes (Sirene)

2024

- As a Reincarnated Aristocrat, I'll Use My Appraisal Skill to Rise in the World (Mireille)
- Chained Soldier (Joryuu)

2025

- Sword of the Demon Hunter: Kijin Gentōshō (Yotaka)
- Secrets of the Silent Witch (Nero)

=== Movies and original video animation (OVA) ===
2003

- Lunar Legend Tsukihime (Arcueid Brunestud)

2005

- School Rumble: Extra Class (Mikoto Suo)

2006

- BALDR FORCE EXE Resolution (Ayane Shido)

2007

- Shakugan no Shana The Movie (Margery Daw)
- Bleach: The DiamondDust Rebellion (Nanao Ise)

2008

- My-Otome 0~S.ifr~ (Sifr's mother)

2010

- Mudazumo Naki Kaikaku (Mrs Hatoyama)

2011

- Hayate the Combat Butler! Heaven Is a Place on Earth (Yukiji Katsura)
- Astarotte no Omocha! (Judit Snorrevík)

2012

- 夢想夏郷, 東方 (Touhou Musou Kakyou / A Summer Day's Dream) (Eirin Yagokoro)
- ToHeart2 Dungeon Travelers (Yuma Tonami)
- Fairy Tail the Movie: Phoenix Priestess (Coordinator)

2013

- Pretty Cure All Stars New Stage 2: Kokoro no Tomodachi (Mana Aida/Cure Heart)
- DokiDoki! PreCure the Movie: Mana's Getting Married!!? The Dress of Hope Tied to the Future (Mana Aida/Cure Heart)

2014

- Pretty Cure All Stars New Stage 3: Eien no Tomodachi (Mana Aida/Cure Heart)
- Pokémon the Movie XY: The Cocoon of Destruction and Diancie (Citron's Harimaron, Ayaka's Absol)

2015

- Pokémon the Movie XY - The Archdjinni of the Rings: Hoopa (Citron's Harimaron)

2016

- Pokémon the Movie XY&Z: Volcanion and the Exquisite Magearna (Citron's Harimaron)

2018

- Hug! Pretty Cure Futari wa Pretty Cure: All Stars Memories (Mana Aida/Cure Heart)

2023

- Pretty Cure All Stars F (Mana Aida/Cure Heart)

2024

- Gekijō-ban Overlord Sei Ōkoku-hen (Remedios Custodio)

=== Video games ===
2003

- Samurai Shodown V (Rimururu/Chample)

2004

- Suikoden IV (Honewort)
- Gantz: The 2nd stage (Kei Kishimoto)
- ToHeart2 (Yuma Tonami)

2005

- Rumble Roses (Candy Cane / Becky)
- Gantz (Kei Kishimoto)
- Wild Arms the 4th Detonator (Raquel Applegate)
- Mabino Style (Tomomi.O.Hiyama)
- School Rumble Nee-san Jiken Desu! (Mikoto Suou)
- School Rumble PS2 (Mikoto Suou)
- Best Students Council (Kanade Jingūji)
- Shadow of the Colossus (Mono)
- Duel Savior Destiny (Nanashi)

2006

- Rumble Roses XX (Candy Cane/Becky)
- Canvas 2: Akane-iro no Palette (Kiri Kikyou)
- Shakugan no Shana (Margery Daw)
- Growlanser: Heritage of War (Elessa)
- Carnage Heart Portable (Matilda)
- Strawberry Panic! Girls' School in Fullbloom (Shizuma Hanazono)
- Schoolgirl Game's High!! (Eriko Takahashi)
- Bullet Witch (Alicia Claus)

2007

- !Shin Chan: Flipa en colores! (Imitation)
- Nodame Cantabile (Saiko Tagaya)
- Ikki Tousen Shining Dragon (Kanu)
- The World Ends with You (Raimu, Konishi)
- Hayate no Gotoku! Boku ga Romeo de Romeo ga Boku de (Yukiji Katsura)
- Fate/tiger colosseum (Bazetto Fraga Makuremittsu)
- Nanatsuiro Drops Pure!! (Croix)
- The Five Games and Kid (Momoko Orizuka)
- Star Ocean: First Departure (Millie Kirito)

2008

- Vampire Kitan Muntaizu (Mizuno Kanako)
- Hayate no Gotoku! Ojousama Produce Daisakusen Boku Iro ni Somare! Gakkou-Hen (Yukiji Katsura)
- Prism Ark: Awake (Kagura)
- Chaos;Head (Aoi Sena)
- Luminous Arc 2: Will (Ayano)
- Soulcalibur IV (Amy, Ashlotte)
- Fate/tiger colosseum Upper (Bazetto Fraga Makuremittsu)
- Infinite Undiscovery (Arya)

2009

- Final Fantasy Crystal Chronicles: Echoes of Time (Undead Celebrity, Irina)
- Chaos;Head Noah (Aoi Sena)
- Hayate no Gotoku! Nightmare Paradise (Yukiji Katsura)
- Zettai Zetsumei Toshi 3: Kowareyuku Machi to Kanojo no Uta (Saki Honjo)
- Arc Rise Fantasia (Sheryi)
- Fate/unlimited codes Portable (Bazetto Fraga Makuremittsu)
- Soulcalibur: Broken Destiny (Amy)
- Tsuyokiss 2gakki: Swift Love (Serebu Tachibana)
- ToHeart2 Portable (Yuma Tonami)
- Sekirei: Mirai Kara no Okurimono (Uzume)
- Queen's Blade: Spiral Chaos (Shizuka)

2010

- White Album 2: Introductory Chapter (Kazusa Touma)
- Everybody's Tennis Portable (Norma)
- Yoake Mae yori Ruri Iro na Portable (Feena Fam Earthlight)
- Nogizaka Haruka no Himitsu: Doujinshi Hajimemashita (Ruko Ayase)
- Chaos;Head Love Chu Chu! (Aoi Sena)
- Ikki Tousen: Xross Impact (Kanu Unchou)
- Chaos;Head Noah Portable (Aoi Sena)
- Tsuyokiss 2gakki Portable (Serebu Tachibana)
- Record of Agarest War 2 (Melvina)

2011

- White Album 2: Closing Chapter (Kazusa Touma)
- Chaos;Head Love Chu Chu! Portable (Aoi Sena)
- Ore no Imōto ga Konnani Kawaii Wake ga Nai Portable ga Tsuzuku Wake ga Nai (Saori Makishima)
- Otomedius Excellent (Diol Twee)
- ToHeart2 DX Plus (Yuma Tonami)
- Terror of the Stratus (Nanase Sasahara)
- Toaru Kagaku no Railgun

2012

- Soulcalibur V (Amy, Viola)
- Dies Irae: Amantes Amentes (Rei Himuro, Issac)
- Anarchy Reigns (Fei Rin)
- Rune Factory 4 (Clorica)
- Aquapazza: Aquaplus Dream Match (Yuna Tonami)
- Suiheisen made Nan Mile? Original Flight (Himuka Nakano)
- White Album 2: Shiawase no Mukogawa (Kazusa Touma)

2013

- Monster Monpiece (Elsa)
- Kajiri Kamui Kagura Akebono no Hikari (Tokoyo Tenma)
- Muv-Luv Alternative - Total Eclipse (Kriska Barchenowa)
- Kimi to Kanojo to Kanojo no Koi (Sone Miyuki)
- Seishun Hajimemashita! (Yoshino Shinonome)

2016

- Aokana: Four Rhythm Across the Blue (Botan Arisaka)
- Breath of Fire 6 (Elise)
- Overwatch (Symmetra)
- Girls' Frontline (M1887, Agent)

2017

- Fire Emblem Heroes (Catria, L'Arachel)

2018

- Princess Connect! Re:Dive (Shizuru / Shizuru Hoshino)
- Soulcalibur VI (Amy)
- Azur Lane (Friedrich der Große)

2019

- Onmyoji (Takiyasha Hime)
- Arknights (Gladiia)
- The Seven Deadly Sins: Grand Cross (Camila)
- Pokémon Masters (Olivia)

2020

- Illusion Connect - Selena

2023

- Sword Art Online: Last Recollection (Fanatio)
- Goddess of Victory: Nikke (Nihilister)

2024

- UNDER NIGHT IN-BIRTH II [Sys:Celes] (Yuzuriha)
- Honkai: Star Rail (Black Swan)

2025

- Donkey Kong Bananza (Poppy Kong)

2026

- Reverse: 1999 (Lorentz Butterfly)
- Wuthering Waves (Qingxiao)
- Nekopara: Sekai Connect (Tsubaki)

=== Drama CD ===
- 07-Ghost (Riria)
- Rakka Ryūsui (Akatsuki Ayase)
- White Album 2 (Kazusa Touma)
- Kotonoha no Miko to Kotodama no Majo to Drama CD (Gretia Dietrich)
- Cyborg 009 Drama Album: Love Stories (Eva Klein)
- Aokana: Four Rhythm Across the Blue (Botan Arisaka)

=== Tokusatsu ===
2015

- Kamen Rider Ghost (Insect Ganma (ep. 7 - 8))

=== Dubbing ===
==== Live-action ====
- I Love You, Beth Cooper (Beth Cooper (Hayden Panettiere))
- Halo (Commander Miranda Keyes (Olive Gray))
- The Hunger Games: Catching Fire (Johanna Mason (Jena Malone))
- The Hunger Games: Mockingjay – Part 1 (Johanna Mason (Jena Malone))
- The Hunger Games: Mockingjay – Part 2 (Johanna Mason (Jena Malone))
- The Man from Toronto (Anne (Kaley Cuoco))
- Wander (Shelly Luscomb (Heather Graham))
