= Nanatsuiro Drops =

2006 video game

- Nanatsuiro Drops original visual novel cover

ななついろ★ドロップス (Nanatsuiro★Doroppusu)
- Genre: Fantasy, Magical girl, Romance
- Video game
- Developer: UNiSONSHIFT
- Publisher: UNiSONSHIFT (Windows); MediaWorks (PS2); ASCII Media Works (DS)
- Genre: Eroge, Visual novel
- Platform: Windows, PS2, DS
- Released: April 21, 2006
- Light novel
- Written by: Tamaki Ichikawa
- Illustrated by: Noizi Ito
- Published by: Enterbrain
- Imprint: Famitsu Bunko
- Published: June 30, 2006
- Manga
- Written by: UNiSONSHIFT
- Illustrated by: Yūki Takami
- Published by: ASCII Media Works
- Magazine: Dengeki G's Magazine; Dengeki G's Festival! Comic
- Original run: November 2006 – August 2010
- Volumes: 6
- Manga

Nanatsuiro Drops Pure!!
- Written by: UNiSONSHIFT
- Illustrated by: Sorahiko Mizushima
- Published by: MediaWorks
- Magazine: Dengeki Comic Gao!
- Original run: April 27, 2007 – February 27, 2008
- Volumes: 1
- Anime television series
- Directed by: Takashi Yamamoto
- Produced by: Kaai Ueno
- Written by: Michiru Shimada
- Music by: Etsuko Yamakawa
- Studio: Studio Barcelona
- Original network: Chiba TV, MBS, TV Hokkaido, TV Kanagawa, TV Saitama, TV Setouchi, Chubu-Nippon, TVQ
- Original run: July 2, 2007 – September 30, 2007
- Episodes: 12

Nanatsuiro Drops (ななついろ★ドロップス, Nanatsuiro★Doroppusu; lit. Seven-Colored Drops) is a Japanese adult visual novel developed by UNiSONSHIFT and released on April 21, 2006 for Windows. The game was later ported to the PlayStation 2 and Nintendo DS. A light novel, written by Tamaki Ichikawa and illustrated by Noizi Ito, was published by Enterbrain in June 2006. Two manga adaptations were published by MediaWorks and later ASCII Media Works. A 12-episode anime produced by Studio Barcelona aired between July and September 2007.

== Plot and setting ==
Masaharu Tsuwabuki is a normal student, though not very social. One day he meets a new student named Sumomo Akihime, and another girl named Nadeshiko Yaeno, Sumomo's close friend. That same afternoon, he suddenly bumps into Arthur, a servant of Nona Yūki from Figurare who at the time was disguised with a mask. The collision causes Arthur to drop a bag full of magical potions; amid gathering up the scattered cans, one of them is accidentally switched with Masaharu's soda can. Upon drinking it, he transforms into a stuffed animal lamb at night. He must collect seven stardrops in order to return to normal.

There are two primary worlds within the story of Nanatsuiro Drops: the human world called Retroscena, and a magical world called Figurare from which the Stellar Spinners originate. There are currently two schools that teach magic within Figurare: Pramu Clovis and Sentou Asparas. According to Natsume, each year the two schools pick their top Stellar Spinners (the one from Pramu Clovis is called Prima Pramu, and from Sentou Asparas is called Prima Asparas) to send to the human world to capture seven stardrops in a goodwill competition to improve relations.

== Characters ==
=== Main characters ===
Masaharu Tsuwabuki (石蕗 正晴, Tsuwabuki Masaharu)
Voiced by: Hirofumi Nojima (human form, anime), Oto Agumi (stuffed animal form, PC), Mai Goto (stuffed animal form, PS2, anime)
A quiet boy who rarely talks to anyone, including his friends. In the beginning of the series, he bumps into Sumomo Akihime, causing her to splash him with water. After the accident, he is inducted into the Gardening Club by Natsume Kisaragi. Later, he receives a mysterious beverage when he bumps into Arthur disguised at the time, who was carrying a bag full of potions, causing them to switch cans, which transforms Masaharu into a stuffed lamb doll. Kisaragi finds him and applies a second potion, allowing him to move and talk. In order to change back, he must work with his partner, "his chosen girl", who happens to be Sumomo. In order to change back, he must collect seven stardrops without telling her his true identity. It is revealed later on that the transformation potion is tied to phases of the moon. During the day he reverts to his human form, but just after sunset he changes to his stuffed animal form.
It is also revealed that on the night of a full moon, he will transform in his stuffed animal form in the evening and go back to being human in the morning, but on the night of a new moon, he will remain human for twenty-four hours, granting him some semblance of a normal life. Later in the series he confesses his love for Sumomo after discovering her feelings for him when he was in his doll form, unbeknownst to Sumomo. In the game version, Sumomo confesses her love to Masaharu. In episode nine he confesses that he is Yuki, the stuffed animal and turns into a normal doll.
He is later changed back, but at the cost of the past five months of his memory which included all his adventures with Sumomo, unknown to her. It is soon discovered that once all the star drops are created, he will forget half of the year he spent with Sumomo, so on the last day before he takes the potion, he spends the night with Sumomo and ended it with a kiss. After taking the potion, he returns to his old self but he lost his memory as a side effect. However, although he doesn't remember the memory of the past few months, he remembered his feeling with Sumomo, thus saying that he will love her again even though his memory is lost.
Sumomo Akihime (秋姫 すもも, Akihime Sumomo)
Voiced by: Fūri Samoto (PC), Michiru Yuimoto (PS2, anime)
A cute yet shy girl who tends only to talk to her close friend Nako. She is a Stellar Spinner, a sort of stardrop collecting magician who is revealed to be a human replacement for one who became ill and was not able to come to the human world to collect the stardrops. She has a deep crush on Masaharu, and though she has him for a partner in collecting the stardrops, she is unaware of his true identity. She has a very non-confrontational attitude, and when she meets Masaharu in his stuffed animal form, she names him "Yuki-chan" (because it sounds cute) and insists he use the word "boku" (僕) to refer to himself instead of the more boastful, and manly "ore" (俺). She is very shy around water and is unable to swim, but soon learns to overcome it when a stardrop falls into a pool. Sumomo is a replacement Stellar Spinner of the Prima Pramu school. She is later revealed to be the daughter of Karin Kisaragi (Natsume's sister), who was considered the greatest Stellar Spinner of all time unbeknownst to Sumomo at the moment. She later learns Masaharu's secret and due to this he turns into a doll and she cries doubting her love. When she discovered the side effect of the potion to cure Masaharu, the couple decide to spend their last night together ending it with a kiss before he drinks the potion, and now Sumomo is struggling how to express love without upsetting him.
Nadeshiko Yaeno (八重野 撫子, Yaeno Nadeshiko)
Voiced by: Kyō Munekawa (PC), Kaori Shimizu (PS2, anime)
"Nako-chan", as she is referred to by Sumomo, is Sumomo's closest friend. While innocently out for a walk, she discovers Sumomo's job as a Stellar Spinner. According to the rules of the collection game, as explained by Natsume, anyone who discovers the identity of a Stellar Spinner (other than her partner) must have their memory erased. Unable to accept this, Sumomo insists on finding another way. Eventually it is discovered that a one-time spell can be cast that binds the Stellar Spinner and one close friend together such that the friend's memory need not be erased. Though the decision was made quickly, Natsume reminds Sumomo and Masaharu that this can only be done once and since this one-time allowance has been made, they will have to be very careful from now on. Being the observant girl she is, Nadeshiko discovered Nona's role as a Stellar Spinner when she put on her human glasses while in her Stellar Spinner form.
Nona Yūki (結城 ノナ, Yūki Nona)
Voiced by: Sae Nagamori (PC), Yuki Matsuoka (PS2, anime)
Another Stellar Spinner, but one from Figurare. Presumably this is her first time in the human world, hence her confusion with certain simple tasks such as washing rice (which she confuses for "sharpening" it due to both words using the same kanji). She is an expert spell-caster and quite proficient at capturing stardrops. Her power level in the beginning far exceeds Sumomo's, as evidenced by her telling Sumomo to try to touch her "recipe" (her spellbook). Sumomo is shocked by it and unable to grasp it. They later develop a friendly rivalry, as well as shared feelings for Masaharu. Nona is the top Stellar Spinner from the Prima Asparas school. Later, she joins Masaharu and Sumomo's school to study the human world; we discover that she altered her appearance so she can attempt to blend in that's why her human appearance is different than her stellar form.
Flora Koiwai (小岩井 フローラ, Koiwai Furōra)
Voiced by: Mina Motoyama (PC), Nami Kurokawa (PS2, anime)
Julirsia Satsuki (皐 ユリーシア, Satsuki Yurīsia)
Voiced by: Mia Naruse (PS2)

=== Secondary characters ===
Natsume Kisaragi (如月 ナツメ, Kisaragi Natsume)
Voiced by: Kazuya Sugisaki (PC), Kishō Taniyama (PS2, anime)
Natsume is a young, attractive teacher at the school where the story takes place. He has great knowledge of Figurare and the Stellar Spinners, as well as the ability to use (and potentially create) magic potions. He serves as a guide and adviser to Sumomo and Masaharu while on their adventures in gathering the stardrops. The reason for his vast knowledge of Figurare and magic are due to his connection to his sister, Karin: Sumomo's mother. Supposedly, he too is from Figurare, but this has yet to be explicitly stated in the anime.
Prima Asparas (プリマ・アスパラス, Purima Asuparasu)
Voiced by: Yuki Matsuoka
Prima the main antagonist who fight against Sumomo to obtain the stardrops.
Arthur Matsuda (アーサー 松田, Āsā Matsuda)
Voiced by: Hiroki Takahashi
Arthur is a being from Figurare and Nona/Prima's ditzy servant. He is also the person responsible for Masaharu's transformation into a doll in episode one. He normally spends his time in human form while serving as Nona's butler; when collecting the stardrops, he changes into his dog form, which is presumably a Doberman Pinscher. He cares deeply for Nona, and is concerned with her health when she tirelessly studies to perform powerful spells in order to compete with Sumomo. Beyond his ability to change forms when searching for stardrops, it is not shown he has any other abilities or powers.
Nobuko Fukamichi (深道 信子, Fukamichi Nobuko)
Voiced by: Jun Kasahara (PC), Megumi Kubota (PS2, anime)
Yayoi Amamori (雨森 弥生, Amamori Yayoi)
Voiced by: Arisu (PC), Sayaka Aoki (PS2, anime)
Keisuke Sakuraba (桜庭 圭介, Sakuraba Keisuke)
Voiced by: Kousuke Kobayashi (PC, PS2), Satoshi Hino (anime)
Natsuki Asamiya (麻宮 夏樹, Asamiya Natsuki)
Voiced by: Nana Nogami (PC), Emi Motoi (PS2, anime)
Akino Asamiya (麻宮 秋乃, Asamiya Akino)
Voiced by: Nana Nogami (PC), Emi Motoi (PS2, anime)
Toua Asamiya (麻宮 冬亜, Asamiya Tōa)
Voiced by: Nana Nogami (PC), Emi Motoi (PS2, anime)
Seishirou Akihime (秋姫 正史郎, Seishirou Akihime)
Voiced by: Kaoru Murasakibana (PC), Kazuhiko Inoue (PS2, anime)
Sumomo's father.
Karin Akihime (秋姫 カリン, Akihime Karin)
Voiced by: Oto Agumi (PC), Mai Goto (PS2), Miki Itō (anime)
Sumomo's mother and Natsume's sister; Sumomo is nearly a mirror-image of her. She was considered the greatest Stellar Spinner of all time. It is cited in the anime that she was once able to capture three stardrops at once on her first day in the human world with a single spell. Soon after coming to the human world, she fell in love with a human and though it was forbidden, she forsook her place in Figurare and eventually gave birth to Sumomo. It is also stated that after giving birth to her she moved to America as a fashion designer, earning money for her family. She later creates a replica of her uniform or sends her old uniform to Sumomo to use.
Croix (クロワ, Kurowa)
Voiced by: Hitomi Nabatame (PS2)

== Media ==
=== Visual novel ===
Nanatsuiro Drops is an adult visual novel developed by UNiSONSHIFT and was released on April 21, 2006, for Windows PCs. The art in the game was provided by Noizi Ito. The game was ported by MediaWorks to the PlayStation 2 on September 20, 2007, with the adult content removed under the title Nanatsuiro Drops Pure!!. A version based heavily on the anime and playable on the Nintendo DS was released in May 2008 by ASCII Media Works.

=== Light novels ===
A light novel titled Nanatsuiro Drops, written by Tamaki Ichikawa, with art by Noizi Ito, was published by Enterbrain on June 30, 2006. A two-volume light novel series titled Nanatsuiro Drops Pure!!, written by Kaya Akasaka and illustrated by Yuki Takami for the inside illustrations and Noizi Ito for the cover art, was published by ASCII Media Works between September 10, 2007, and May 10, 2008.

=== Manga ===
A manga series titled Nanatsuiro Drops, illustrated by Yūki Takami, was serialized in ASCII Media Works' Dengeki G's Magazine between the November 2006 and May 2008 issues. It was then transferred to Dengeki G's Festival! Comic and ran in that magazine until the August 2010 issue. Six tankōbon volumes were released between April 27, 2007, and October 27, 2010. Another manga series named Nanatsuiro Drops Pure!!, illustrated by Sorahiko Mizushima, was serialized in the shōnen manga magazine Dengeki Comic Gao! between April 27, 2007, and February 27, 2008, published by MediaWorks. The manga was cancelled with the discontinuation of Dengeki Comic Gao! in February 2008. A single volume was published in November 2007.

=== Internet radio show ===
An Internet radio show called Nanatsuiro Radio! was broadcast between April 6, 2007, and March 21, 2008, produced by MediaWorks.

=== Anime ===
A 12-episode anime series produced by Studio Barcelona aired in Japan on Chiba TV between July 3 and September 30, 2007. Two pieces of theme music were used for the anime: one opening theme and one ending theme. The opening theme is "Shining stars bless☆" by Kaori Utatsuki, and the ending theme is "Mo・o!" by Loverin Tamburin.
