= In Search of the Lost Future =

Japanese adult visual novel by Trumple

- In Search of the Lost Future original visual novel cover

失われた未来を求めて (Ushinawareta Mirai o Motomete)
- Genre: Drama, Romance, Science fiction
- Video game
- Developer: Trumple
- Publisher: Trumple
- Genre: Eroge, Visual novel
- Platform: Windows
- Released: November 26, 2010
- Manga
- Written by: Trumple; Atelier High Key
- Illustrated by: Sasayuki
- Published by: Kadokawa Shoten
- Magazine: Comp Ace
- Original run: November 2011 – October 2012
- Volumes: 2
- Anime television series
- Directed by: Naoto Hosoda
- Written by: Rie Kawamata
- Music by: Fūga Hatori
- Studio: Feel
- Licensed by: AUS: Madman Entertainment; NA: Funimation; SA/SEA: Muse Communication
- Original network: AT-X, Tokyo MX, CTC, tvk, TV Saitama, KBS, Sun TV, TV Aichi, BS11
- English network: SEA: Animax Asia; US: Funimation
- Original run: October 4, 2014 – December 20, 2014
- Episodes: 12
- Manga
- Written by: Trumple; Atelier High Key
- Illustrated by: Takeshi Kagura
- Published by: Media Factory
- Magazine: Monthly Comic Alive
- Original run: December 2014 – present
- Original video animation
- Directed by: Naoto Hosoda
- Studio: Feel
- Licensed by: AUS: Madman Entertainment; NA: Funimation
- Released: August 29, 2015
- Runtime: 24 minutes

In Search of the Lost Future (失われた未来を求めて, Ushinawareta Mirai o Motomete), subtitled À la recherche du futur perdu ("In search of the lost future" in French), sometimes abbreviated as Waremete (われめて), is a Japanese adult visual novel developed by Trumple and released for Windows on November 26, 2010. The title is derived from In Search of Lost Time, a French novel written by Marcel Proust. There have been two manga adaptations published by Kadokawa Shoten and Media Factory. A 12-episode anime adaptation, produced by Feel and directed by Naoto Hosoda, aired in Japan between October and December 2014.

== Gameplay ==
Average dialogue and narrative in In Search of the Lost Future depicting the main character Sō talking to Nagisa, Airi and Yui (respectively).

In Search of the Lost Future is a romance visual novel in which the player assumes the role of Sō Akiyama. Much of its gameplay is spent on reading the story's narrative and dialogue. The text in the game is accompanied by character sprites, which represent who Sō is talking to, over background art. Throughout the game, the player encounters CG artwork at certain points in the story, which take the place of the background art and character sprites. In Search of the Lost Future follows a branching plot line with multiple endings, and depending on the decisions that the player makes during the game, the plot will progress in a specific direction.

There are four main plot lines that the player will have the chance to experience, one for each heroine. Throughout gameplay, the player is given multiple options to choose from, and text progression pauses at these points until a choice is made. Some decisions can lead the game to end prematurely, which offer an alternative ending to the plot. To view all plot lines in their entirety, the player will have to replay the game multiple times and choose different choices to further the plot to an alternate direction. Throughout gameplay, there are scenes with sexual CGs depicting Sō and a given heroine having sex.

== Plot ==
In Search of the Lost Future is set in Uchihama Academy (内浜学園, Uchihama Gakuen) and with the number of new students at the school increasing every year, a new school building is constructed. Before they move to the new building, the school will hold one last General Club Festival at the old building before it is closed down. Each of the clubs decide to give it their all to make it a success. Sō Akiyama is a member of the astronomy club, and just before the festival is to begin, the student executive committee asks the club's members to calm the uneasiness among the students in regard to mysterious incidents at the old building. When Yui Furukawa, a quiet girl, transfers late into the school year and appears before Sō, the gears of fate slowly begin to move.

== Characters ==
=== Main characters ===
The six main characters are students in the Astronomy Club at Uchihama Academy.

Sō Akiyama (秋山 奏, Akiyama Sō)
Voiced by: Takuma Terashima (anime), Yurika Aizawa (7 years old)
He is a second-year student in class B and a member of the Astronomy Club at Uchihama Academy. Both his father and mother are scientists and are authorities on mechanical engineering. He lives in his childhood friend's house as his parents work overseas. He is interested in astronomy, and plans build a planetarium for the school festival. Due to Kaori's fate, he is strongly motivated in studying medical treatment and Quantum Turing, hoping to achieve a brighter future. In the anime, Sō chooses Yui over Kaori.

Kaori Sasaki (佐々木 佳織, Sasaki Kaori)
Voiced by: Miyabi Arisugawa (game), Hatsumi Takada (anime)
Sō's childhood friend. She is a second-year student in class B. She is Sō's classmate and the vice-president of the Astronomy Club. She is kindhearted and is good at cooking. She lives with her mother and Sō in a house; Sō's room is in a building detached from the main house. Kaori is in love with Sō and later confesses her feelings to him. At the beginning of the series, Kaori gets hit by a bus and falls into a coma. This prompts Sō to study science and medicine in order to save her. As Kaori was saved in the past, she wakes up from her coma in the present time where Sō was finally able to return her feelings.

Yui Furukawa (古川 ゆい, Furukawa Yui)
Voiced by: Yukari Aoyama (game), Akane Tomonaga (anime)
A first-year student in class A and primary heroine who has transferred into Uchihama Academy recently. She joins in the Astronomy Club after she meets Sō. Yui is an artificial intelligence created from an AI Unit research project, sent into the past (October 1) multiple times by Sō to save Kaori from an impending accident at the beginning of the series. She falls in love with future Sō and manages to confess her feelings to past Sō before disappearing after successfully saving Kaori. This gives Sō a new purpose to recreate Yui shown in the epilogue.

Airi Hasekura (支倉 愛理, Hasekura Airi)
Voiced by: Rino Kawashima (game), Kei Mizusawa (anime)
Kaori's close friend. She is a second-year student in class A and is the president of the Astronomy Club. She is wise and plays a leading part in the club. She learns aikido and is much stronger than Sō. She mainly uses kicks while fighting against others. In the future, she becomes an assistant scientist for Sō. She has feelings for Sō but hides it knowing that Kaori loves him.

Nagisa Hanamiya (華宮 凪沙, Hanamiya Nagisa)
Voiced by: Tomoe Tamiyasu
A third-year student in class C and is a member of the astronomy club. She comes from a good family, where her father expects great things from her. She is the host of Hanamiya Society (華宮会, Hanamiya-kai), an intelligence agency based on her fan club in the school. She is clever, but is a bit mean. She often reads a book in the clubroom, and possess a mysterious black box related to Yui's essence. In the future, Nagisa constructs the Hanamiya General Research Laboratory to pursue her goal and provide hope. Nagisa's great-grandmother, who was a War Plant researcher, founded Uchihama Academy after she met Yui through a time-loop via the black box.

Kenny Eitarō Osafune (長船･KENNY(ケニー)･英太郎, Osafune Kenī Eitarō)
Voiced by: Kappei Yamaguchi
A second-year student in class C. He is a member of the Astronomy Club and is Sō's close friend. He is an exchange student from the United States. He is not that wise, but is very kind to his friends. He has a stout girlfriend named Jennifer, who lives in the U.S. His name is written as "Osafune Kenny Eitarou" in the game's opening movie. In the future, he delivered the theory on possible time-traveling to Sō.

=== Other characters ===
President (会長, Kaichō)
Voiced by: Hayato (game), Hayato Nakata (anime)
A third-year student in class C and is the president of the student council executive. His real name is unknown. He puts the Astronomy Club in charge of maintaining calmness among the school until the festival.

Neko Yamaga (山賀 寧子, Yamaga Neko)
Voiced by: Kotone Kagami (game), Mia Naruse (anime)
A second-year student in class B who wears glasses. She is the vice-president of the student council executive, and is a classmate of Sō and Kaori. She is normally referred to as "vice-president" (副会長, fuku-kaichō) in the game.

Sakunoshin Honjō (本城 作之進, Honjō Sakunoshin)
Voiced by: Sōichi Yamanaka (game), Akio Ōtsuka (anime)
An elderly steward to the Hanamiya family and is Nagisa's bodyguard. He has some experience in Mongolian wrestling.

Mitsunori Ogawa (小川 光憲, Ogawa Mitsunori)
Voiced by: Hadōken (game), Kenichi Ogata (anime)
An old teacher at Uchihama Academy. He is the adviser at the Astronomy Club and is the school library's manager. He seldom turns up at the club.

Shiori Sasaki (佐々木 詩織, Sasaki Shiori)
Voiced by: Mina Motoyama (game), Yūko Gotō (anime)
Kaori's mother and is a researcher at the National Institute of Science. Her husband is also a researcher and works with Sō's parents. She immersed herself in studying the human brain.

Yaeko Azuma (東 八重子, Azuma Yaeko)
Voiced by: Aiko Tomato (game), Atsumi Tanezaki (anime)
A third-year student in class C and a classmate of Nagisa. She is in the Literary Club at Uchihama Academy. She encounters a ghost in the school and tells the Astronomy Club's members about that experience. She is shy and is out of luck by nature.

Boss (ボス, Bosu)
Voiced by: Kikutarō Namerikawa (game), Takuo Kawamura (anime)
The president of the Judo Club at Uchihama Academy. His real name is unknown. He is very rough and lacks flexibility. In the original universe, he shoves Kaori during a confrontation, injuring her leg. During the General festival, the Judo and Karate Club have a friendly match.

Karin Fukazawa (深沢 花梨, Fukazawa Karin)
Voiced by: Satomi Satō (anime)
A first-year student and a classmate of Yui. She becomes friends with Yui as she sits next to Yui in the classroom. She is an idol and often appears in television. She is an original character for the anime television series.

== Development and release ==
In Search of the Lost Future is the sole title developed by the visual novel studio Trumple. Originally, the design team were developing the game under the visual novel developer Abhar, but following Abhar's dissolution, the team working on the game formed the studio Trumple. The game's scenario was written by three people: Ryo Ohta, Kenji Saitō, and Masaki Sawa. Character design and art direction for the game was split between three artists: Kurehito Misaki, who drew Kaori Sasaki, Airi Hasekura, Shiori Sasaki, and designs for male characters; Shinobu Kuroya, who drew Yui Furukawa, Nagisa Hanamiya, and the designs for the female characters (not including those drawn by Misaki); and Mia Naruse, who provided super deformed illustrations. The game's music was solely composed by Fūga Hatori. In Search of the Lost Future was released on November 26, 2010, as a limited-edition version, playable as a DVD on a Windows PC. The regular edition of In Search of the Lost Future was released on February 25, 2011. After the game's release, Trumple announced the suspension of their activity on July 27, 2012.

== Related media ==
=== Print media ===
A manga adaptation illustrated by Sasayuki was serialized in Kadokawa Shoten's Comp Ace magazine between the November 2011 and October 2012 issues. Two tankōbon volumes were released: the first on February 23, 2012, and the second on November 17, 2012. A second manga, illustrated by Takeshi Kagura, began serialization in Media Factory's Monthly Comic Alive magazine with the December 2014 issue sold on October 27, 2014. Enterbrain published a 128-page guidebook for the game titled Ushinawareta Mirai o Motomete Visual Fanbook on May 27, 2011.

=== Anime ===
A 12-episode anime television series adaptation, produced by Feel and directed by Naoto Hosoda, aired in Japan between October 4 and December 20, 2014. The scripts are written by Sadayuki Murai, Tatsuya Takahashi, and Satoko Shinozuka, and the series composition is by Rie Kawamata. The music is composed by Fūga Hatori, and Satoshi Motoyama serves as the sound director. The anime has been licensed for streaming in North America by Funimation, and in Southeast Asia by Muse Communication. There is a French sentence, "Nous dépassons beaucoup d'aujourd'hui, et changerons le destin quelque jour" (literally translated as "We pass many today, and change the destiny someday", and interpreted as "We pass by much today, and someday will change our fate"), at the bottom of the anime's title logo.

No.	Title	Original release date
1	"The Lost Future"; Transliteration: "Ushinawareta Mirai" (Japanese: 失われた未来)	October 4, 2014
Sō Akiyama is living with his childhood friend Kaori Sasaki, both attending Uchihama Academy and are members of the Astronomy Club. Along with fellow club members Nagisa Hanamiya, Airi Hasekura and Kenny Osafune, they deal issues of other clubs. After she confessed her true feelings to Sō, Kaori gets involved in an accident when a bus lost its control. In the credits scene, the Astronomy Club room experiences an earthquake-like shake while Nagisa's black box suddenly illuminates. Sō then checks the floor above and finds an unconscious girl.
2	"Proving the Existence of Her and the Ghost"; Transliteration: "Kanojo to Rei no Sonzai Shōmei" (Japanese: 彼女と霊の存在証明)	October 11, 2014
The girl found in the previous episode introduces herself as Yui Furukawa and has an amnesia despite knowing Sō's name. With the help of Nagisa, Yui becomes a student of Uchihama Academy. The Astronomy Club, along with Yui as a provisional member, prepares for the upcoming school festival. The student council seeks help from the club to investigate rumors of ghost sightings in the academy. Yui retrieves her hat in the club room and accidentally activates the black box. She then vaguely tells Nagisa about her mission in coming to the school, seemingly regaining her memories.
3	"The President Dreams with Sparkling Eyes"; Transliteration: "Kaichō wa Kirameku Hitomi de Yume o Miru" (Japanese: 会長はきらめく瞳で夢を見る)	October 18, 2014
Airi reminisces meeting Kaori and Sō for the first time, with her hidden feelings for him. The Astronomy Club members meet up to investigate further the ghost sightings, when student council's vice president Neko Yamaga asked for assistance about the issue between Judo and Karate clubs. Yui senses that Kaori would have an ankle injury due to her involvement with the scuffle (as seen on the first episode) so she pulls her out of the scene immediately. As the Astronomy Club members continue with their investigation, the librarian tells Nagisa and Kenny about the ghost's presence on the roof while Kaori and Yui find it in the cafeteria. It turns out to be a setup made by the Film Society. As the club members head home, Yui looks back at the school. The final scene shows the appearance of a ghost on the roof.
4	"All Things Are in a State of Flux"; Transliteration: "Banbutsu wa Ruten Suru" (Japanese: 万物は流転する)	October 25, 2014
Sō receives a camera from Nagisa after she obtained it from the Film Society. He starts to take pictures of his schoolmates and some Astronomy Club members. They decide to ditch the afternoon class for visiting Lighthouse Park. They miss the bus stop for the park so they arrive at Hoshigaoka Ravine instead. Kaori reminisces going to the ravine with Sō in the past. Kaori gets hurt when a snake showed up, losing her shoe on the river. As Kaori attempts to help Sō retrieve the shoe, Yui intervenes instead as she is concerned for her safety. The Astronomy Club members take a group photo using Sō's camera.
5	"The Way of the Quantum Cat and the Droplet"; Transliteration: "Ryōshi Neko to Shizuku no Yukue" (Japanese: 量子猫と雫の行方)	November 1, 2014
During their class, Sō, Kaori, and Airi listen as their teacher explains the concept of Schrödinger's cat and the many-worlds interpretation. Afterwards, the Astronomy Club deals another club issue when some Girls Survival Game Club members caused Airi to stumble on Neko, destroying the latter's laptop. Sō, Airi, Nagisa, and Kenny visit the Computer Club to get a replacement. Kaori and Yuri stay in the club room, and discuss the latter's relationship to Sō. Nagisa beats the AI programming created by Computer Club members using the liar paradox. At night, Kaori talks with Sō in his room.
6	"Career Counseling for a Bird in a Cage"; Transliteration: "Kago no Tori no Shinro Sōdan" (Japanese: 籠の鳥の進路相談)	November 8, 2014
The Astronomy Club members discuss their career plan once graduated from high school. Airi gives Yui a club badge. Nagisa accompanies Sō in getting the developed photos. They meet Nagisa's fiancé named Hikaru Reito but she introduces Sō to him as her "boyfriend". They arrive at an arcade center to play bowling and arcade games.
7	"Waiting 2.39 Million Light-years"; Transliteration: "Nihyaku-sanjū-kyū-man Kōnen no Omoi" (Japanese: 239万光年の想い)	November 15, 2014
With the exception of Nagisa, the Astronomy Club visits Kaori's house to bake some pastries while working on a miniature planetarium in preparation for the upcoming school festival. Yui sneaks in Nagisa's room to steal her bear-like keychain attached on her bag and promises to return it. They go grocery shopping with Yui's urgency for Kaori to buy tea powder since its supply ran short in the club room. Upon returning home, Yui helps Sō in building the miniature planetarium. While Sō lectures Yui about stars, she remembers a similar scene with a man that looked like him. Nagisa arrives later that day and the complete Astronomy Club watches in awe the miniature planetarium. Sō calls Yui by her first name, causing Kaori's to become jealous.
8	"Shooting Stars Passing in the Night"; Transliteration: "Surechigau Ryūsei" (Japanese: すれ違う流星)	November 22, 2014
Kaori acts strange to Sō because of jealousy. The Astronomy Club meets up at the Lighthouse Park later night to stargaze. Kaori then confesses her true feelings to Sō. The following day, Sō avoids Kaori as he has not answered her confession yet. Yui becomes restless as she wants to make sure of Kaori's safety during that day. Kaori then ditches Yui, but she changes her mind and goes back to the club room. Nagisa tells Kaori that Yui followed her to the school gate. Yui reaches the bus stop but Kaori is not there yet. Finally, Yui sees Kaori approaching the bus stop but she is too late to save her as the bus begins losing its control. The Astronomy Club waits in the hospital room with Kaori's mother Shiori. The final scene shows Yui in a futuristic tube machine while a man says her name.
9	"Gateway to the Past"; Transliteration: "Kako e no Tobira" (Japanese: 過去への扉)	November 29, 2014
Kaori falls in coma. This leads Sō in pursuing medicine to save her. In the near future, Nagisa constructs Hanamiya General Research Laboratory at Uchihama Academy. Inside the laboratory, Sō and Airi meet Shiori as part of the research team that planned on recreating a synthetic body similar to Yui since Nagisa found out that she was an artificial human being. The team will then transfers the consciousness of the original Kaori to the synthetic body but the experiment ends up in failure. As he studies methods of saving Kaori, Sō stumbles on Kenny's research paper about time travel and decides to send Yui back in the past instead.
10	"The Time Remaining"; Transliteration: "Nokosareta Jikan" (Japanese: 残された時間)	December 6, 2014
Yui is successfully sent back in time (on October 1) prior Kaori's accident (on October 14). It is revealed that she was sent back in the past multiple times since previous attempts in saving Kaori ended up failing. This causes the ghost sightings and the Uchihama syndrome that put a person in a deep sleep upon contact with it. While in Sasaki's residence to bake some pastries, Kaori confronts Yui about her feelings to Sō. This leads Yui to run away but she is chased by Sō. She asks him to love Kaori back so that he will not regret it in the future.
11	"I'll See You Again Tomorrow, Right?"; Transliteration: "Ashita Mata, Aeru yo ne?" (Japanese: 明日また, 会えるよね?)	December 13, 2014
Yui runs away from school and is found by Sō near the beach. They stroll around Uchihama and head to Lighthouse Park for stargazing. Yui tells Sō to keep Kaori inside the club room tomorrow and respond her confession. The next day, Yui says goodbye to Airi after she made sure that both Kaori and Sō were inside the club room. Kaori confesses her love to Sō but he rejects her because he chooses Yui over her. Sō chases after Yui when the bus began losing its control. The two avoid the incident but Yui begins to fade away since Kaori was kept safe. They both confess their feelings and kiss each other. As the accident is being handled by authorities, the Astronomy Club members find Sō but they show no recollection of Yui. The final scene shows a photo of the club with five of them without her.
12	"The Future That Has You"; Transliteration: "Kimi no Iru Mirai" (Japanese: 君のいる未来)	December 20, 2014
The following day, Airi tells Kaori and Sō about the sudden wake of individuals who experienced Uchihama Syndrome. In the near future, Airi and Sō discuss the possibility of merging timelines if Yui is able to save Kaori. Back to the present, the Astronomy Club experiences déjà vu about a missing member. The club hosts their caferia-themed planetarium during the school festival while Kaori wins Miss Uchihama contest. Yui's classmate named Karin Fukazawa visits the club to discuss about someone whom she could not recall. While he cleans the club room, Sō picks up Yui's photo of the club when the black box suddenly glowed. He then hears her voice calling his name and begins to cry. Back to the near future, Kaori wakes up from coma and is greeted by Sō, both hugging each other in tears.
OVA	"In Search of the Lost Summer Break"; Transliteration: "Ushinawareta Natsuyasumi o Motomete" (Japanese: 失われた夏休みを求めて)	August 29, 2015
In a deviated timeline, Yui is sent back to July 13 instead. She joins the Astronomy Club during summer vacation in Nagisa's villa and enjoys hot spring with them. The following day, a storm hits while they enjoy the beach, leading them to take shelter in a war plant. As they explore the plant, the club members encounter a wandering ghost that put Sō in a sleep, and frightened Airi and Kaori. The ghost is found by Yui then she uses the black box to temporarily merge their timelines. The ghost turns out to be Nagisa's great-grandmother, whose timeline was during the war. After they briefly conversed, Yui rejoins other club members as they find a wine cellar exit that would bring them back to villa. Nagisa shows a photo of her great-grandmother to her family's elder steward named Sakunoshin Honjō, who revealed about the latter's role as the founder of Uchihama Academy because of her meeting with a certain girl from the future. Back to the near future, Airi and Sō see a smiling Yui inside the tube machine, with him stating that she was having a good dream.

=== Music ===
The visual novel In Search of the Lost Future has three theme songs sung by Miyuki Hashimoto: the opening theme "Mugen Mirai" (∞未来; "Infinite Future"), the insert song "Ray of Memories", and the ending theme "Salut.soleil!" ("Bye! Sun."). A single containing all three songs was released by Lantis on October 27, 2010.

The anime's opening theme song is "Le jour" ("The Day") sung by Satomi Satō, and the ending theme song is "Ashita Mata Aeru yo ne" (明日また会えるよね; "We'll Meet Again Tomorrow, Right?"), with three different variations sung by Kaori Sasaki (Hatsumi Takada), Yui Furukawa (Akane Tomonaga), and them both. Both singles were released on October 22, 2014.

== Reception ==
From September to November 2010, In Search of the Lost Future ranked twice in the top ten in national PC game pre-orders in Japan. The rankings were at No. 3 from September to October, and No. 1 from October to November. In Search of the Lost Future ranked first in terms of national sales of PC games in Japan in November 2010. The game ranked twice more at No. 43 for both December 2010 and February 2011.
