= List of Squid Girl episodes =

Shinryaku! Ika Musume (2010) Japanese DVD volume 1 cover

Squid Girl, known in Japan as Shinryaku! Ika Musume (Invasion! Squid Girl), is an anime series produced by Diomedea based on the comedy manga series by Masahiro Anbe published in Weekly Shōnen Champion. The series tells of a Squid Girl who seeks to invade humanity as revenge for the pollution of the seas. However, due to accidentally breaking the wall of a beach house, she is forced to work as a waitress to pay off the damages.

The first season aired on TV Tokyo between October 4 and December 20, 2010, and was also released with English subtitles on Crunchyroll. The fifth and sixth DVD/Blu-ray volumes, released on April 20, 2011, and May 18, 2011, contain short "Mini-Ika Musume" episodes. A second anime season titled Shinryaku!? Ika Musume aired in Japan between September 26 and December 26, 2011. Three original video animation (OVA) episodes were released on August 8, 2012, June 7, 2013, and September 9, 2014, respectively. Crunchyroll began streaming the OVAs in February 2014.

Media Blasters licensed the anime in North America under the title Squid Girl. The first season was released on two DVD volumes on September 27 and December 6, 2011, respectively, followed by a Blu-ray Disc release on March 13, 2012. Media Blasters will also be releasing the second season. The first season was released on DVD in the United Kingdom by Manga Entertainment on August 13, 2012.

The first season uses two pieces of theme music: one opening theme and one ending theme. The opening theme is "Shinryaku no Susume" (侵略ノススメ☆, Let's Invade!) by Ultra-Prism with Hisako Kanemoto and the ending theme is "Metamerism" (メタメリズム, Metamerizumu) by Kanae Itō. For the second season, the opening theme is "High Powered" by Sphere, and the ending theme is "Learning About You" (君を知ること, Kimi o Shiru Koto) by Kanemoto. For the OVAs, the opening theme is "Let's Shinryaku Time!" (Let's☆侵略タイム!, Let's Shinryaku Taimu) by Ultra-Prism, the ending theme for the first two OVAs is "Puzzle" (パズル, Pazuru) by Itō, and the ending theme for the third OVA is "Miser's Dream" (マイザーズドリーム, Maizāzu Dorīmu) by Itō.

In Japanese, each episode's title is in the form of a negative question in order to end with nai ka and thus make a pun with the Japanese word for squid ika. The last two syllables (i, ka) are written with katakana instead of hiragana in order to emphasize the pun. Example: Shinryaku Shina-ika? (侵略しなイカ?)

== Episode list ==
=== Shinryaku! Ika Musume (2010) ===
No.	English title (Note: English episode titles are taken from Crunchyroll and Sentai Filmworks home media) Original Translated Title	Original release date
1	"Who's up for a squidvasion? / Shall We Start a Squid-vasion? / Aren't You Going To Invade?"; Transliteration: "Shinryaku shina-ika?" (Japanese: 侵略しなイカ？)	October 5, 2010
1	"Hold on a squid, aren't you a compatriot? / Aren't You My Fellow Squid? / Aren't You My Comrade?"; Transliteration: "Dōhō ja na-ika?" (Japanese: 同胞じゃなイカ？)	October 5, 2010
1	"Aren't I just the squiddiest? / I'm Squid-vincible, Don't You Th-INK? / Aren't I The Strongest?"; Transliteration: "Saikyō ja na-ika?" (Japanese: 最強じゃなイカ？)	October 5, 2010
Angered by the pollution in the seas, Squid Girl comes from the sea and declares the invasion of Earth at a nearby beachside diner, but is not taken seriously due to her small stature. When Squid Girl goes to plead her case, she is mistaken for a waitress, which puts the responsibility of invading the world into perspective. When she breaks a hole in the store with her tentacles, trying to hit a mosquito, the store manager Eiko Aizawa puts her to work in order to pay for the damages. Later, Squid Girl meets Eiko's little brother, Takeru Aizawa, who goes to great lengths to pretend to be a squid-person so he can be her comrade. During a rainy day where there are few customers, Squid Girl takes the opportunity to try and take over the stand by ensnaring Eiko and Takeru, but is overpowered by the eldest sister Chizuru Aizawa when she tries to ensnare her. As punishment, Squid Girl is forced to use her own ink to make squid ink spaghetti which becomes popular.
2	"Wait a squid, aren't you on my side? / You're Not My Squid-in-Arms? / Aren't You My Companion?"; Transliteration: "Nakama ja na-ika?" (Japanese: 仲間じゃなイカ？)	October 12, 2010
2	"Up for a squid-celebration? / Shall We Have an Ex-squids-ite Celebration? / Won't You Celebrate?"; Transliteration: "Iwawana-ika?" (Japanese: 祝わなイカ？)	October 12, 2010
2	"Wanna play with this squid? / Let's have a Grand, Squiddy Time, Shall We? / Won't You Come And Play?"; Transliteration: "Asobana-ika?" (Japanese: 遊ばなイカ？)	October 12, 2010
Squid Girl meets lifeguard Goro Arashiyama, though she gets annoyed when he does not live up to her definition of "guardian of the sea." Squid Girl tries to hold him down from rescuing a little girl trapped in a riptide, but must save her herself. After witnessing a birthday party, Squid Girl decides she wants one as well, so Eiko and Chizuru hold a "hatch party" for her and play with some sparklers and firecrackers. Squid Girl later meets Eiko's friend Sanae Nagatsuki who takes a creepy liking towards her and later forces her to cosplay for her personal photo collection.
3	"Aren't you a fraidy-squid? / Who's a Fraidy-Squid? / Aren't You Scared?"; Transliteration: "Kowakuna-ika?" (Japanese: 怖くなイカ？)	October 19, 2010
3	"You're the squid's sworn enemy, aren't you? / Aren't You My Nemes-Squid? / Aren't You My Natural Enemy?"; Transliteration: "Tenteki ja na-ika?" (Japanese: 天敵じゃなイカ？)	October 19, 2010
3	"Squidzooks! Aren't you a new recruit? / INKsn't that the New Squid on the Block? / Aren't You New?"; Transliteration: "Shin'iri ja na-ika?" (Japanese: 新入りじゃなイカ？)	October 19, 2010
The gang take Squid Girl, who had never heard of ghosts before, on a test of courage at the local cemetery, but when she goes on ahead, she activates her bioluminescence, which scares the others. Later, Squid Girl plays with Takeru in the beach waters, but she freaks out when inflatable killer whales and sharks (her natural predators) appear. When Takeru almost drowns, Takeru asks Goro to teach him how to swim; but Squid Girl tries to upstage him. Surfer girl Nagisa Saito joins Lemon as a hired hand, but when she is scared of Squid Girl, the latter is pleased that someone actually fears her. Nagisa is puzzled that the others do not think Squid Girl is dangerous.
4	"How much is that squiddy in the window? / Th-INK-ing of Buying That? / Won't You Buy Something?"; Transliteration: "Kawana-ika?" (Japanese: 買わなイカ？)	October 26, 2010
4	"Ride 'em, Squiddy! / Won't You Come INK-side? Aren't You Intruding?"; Transliteration: "Norikomana-ika?" (Japanese: 乗りこまなイカ？)	October 26, 2010
4	"You're phonier than an 11-tentacled squid! / Aren't You an INK-poster? / Aren't You A Fake?"; Transliteration: "Nisemono ja na-ika?" (Japanese: ニセモノじゃなイカ？)	October 26, 2010
When Squid Girl finds a lost wallet, the owner rewards her with 10,000 yen; so the Aizawas have her shop with Nagisa. When Squid Girl has to stay at the beach shack and the television set breaks down, she works on her invasion plan. Squid Girl is invited the next night to stay over with the Aizawas but wants to play instead of sleep. While exploring a nearby beach, Squid Girl and Eiko find a woman dressed up in a mechanized Squid Girl kigurumi head, which was built by the owner of a rival beach shack. The owner wants the real Squid Girl so he has the two Squid Girls compete in a series of contests.
5	"Not from this sea, are you? / Aren't You a Vi-squid-tor from Outer Space? / Aren't You An Alien?"; Transliteration: "Uchūjin ja na-ika?" (Japanese: 宇宙人じゃなイカ？)	November 2, 2010
5	"Why not join the school of fish? / Shall We Squidaddle to School? / Won't You Go To School?"; Transliteration: "Gakkō ni Ikana-ika?" (Japanese: 学校に行かなイカ？)	November 2, 2010
5	"Wouldn't having a pet be squidtastic? / Don't You Want a Squidtastic Pet? / Won't You Keep It?"; Transliteration: "Kawana-ika?" (Japanese: 飼わなイカ？)	November 2, 2010
A blonde woman scientist named Cindy Campbell believes Squid Girl is an extraterrestrial alien and wants to take her back to her lab. She brainwashes Squid Girl into thinking she is actually an alien, but the latter's appetite eventually snaps her out of it. Later, Squid Girl visits Eiko's school, believing it to be a military base. She holds the principal captive and declares her invasion plans over the PA system before Eiko stops her. A story is presented in which Eiko finds a really small Squid Girl and raises it as a pet until Eiko herself dies of old age; it turns out to be a dream from Sanae, who is jealous of not being in it.
6	"Up for an inkredible Hero Stage Show? / An INK-credible Hero Stage Show / Isn't That A Hero Show?"; Transliteration: "Hīrō shō ja na-ika?" (Japanese: ヒーローショーじゃなイカ？)	November 9, 2010
6	"Squidn't you be studying right now? / Squidn't You Be Studying? / Won't You Study?"; Transliteration: "Benkyō shina-ika?" (Japanese: 勉強しなイカ?)	November 9, 2010
6	"Is this inkfatuation or love? / Don't You Th-INK it's Love? / Isn't That Love?"; Transliteration: "Koi ja na-ika?" (Japanese: 恋じゃなイカ？)	November 9, 2010
During a hero show at the beach, Squid Girl realizes that the villain monster is a squid so she gets everyone to cheer for the villain, causing the performers to have to change the plot. Later, Eiko is shocked to find Squid Girl can solve math problems. Squid Girl agrees to teach Eiko provided that she do Squid Girl's chores, meanwhile, Squid Girl tries to show off her genius math ability to the other regulars. Later, after Goro saves Nagisa from drowning, Squid Girl tries to keep Nagisa scared of her, but when Squid Girl argues with Goro, Nagisa gets more confused that he might be brainwashed, while Eiko gets hints that Nagisa might have a crush on Goro.
7	"Focus your tentacles on her! / I Th-INK I'm Being Targeted? / Won't You Be Targeted?"; Transliteration: "Nerawarena-ika?" (Japanese: 狙われなイカ？)	November 16, 2010
7	"Feeling inkuisitive? / How About Some Scien-squid-fic Research? / Won't You Research?"; Transliteration: "Kenkyū shina-ika?" (Japanese: 研究しなイカ？)	November 16, 2010
7	"A squiddle work never killed anyone / Will You Do a Squiddle Work Here? / Won't You Work?"; Transliteration: "Hatarakana-ika?" (Japanese: 働かなイカ？)	November 16, 2010
Nagisa goes to the Aizawa residence for her welcome party, but finds Squid Girl, who tells her she has a master invasion plan. Nagisa asks to stay the night in order to watch over Squid Girl. Nagisa pretends not to be scared of Squid Girl, which upsets her. Eiko tries to convince Squid Girl to get along with Nagisa, but Nagisa's fear rises up again. Squid Girl role-plays a queen for the day, and recruits the others to be her servants. Cindy tricks Squid Girl into going to her research lab where she and Eiko meet Cindy's research assistants Harris, Clark, and Martin. Later, the girls run into the shy girl Ayumu and offer her a trial run working at their stand. As Ayumu attracts more sales, Eiko lets the owner borrow Squid Girl for the Southern Winds, where she proves to be a worthwhile entertainer.
8	"Aren't you a squiddle under the weather? / Aren't You Feeling a Squiddle Sick? / Aren't You Sick?"; Transliteration: "Byōki ja na-ika?" (Japanese: 病気じゃなイカ？)	November 23, 2010
8	"Ink that a new ability? / INKsn't That a new Squid-bility? / Isn't That A New Ability?"; Transliteration: "Shin-nōryoku ja na-ika?" (Japanese: 新能力じゃなイカ？)	November 23, 2010
8	"Squidn't you bring an umbrella? / Can I Stand Under Your Squid-brella? / Won't You Use It?"; Transliteration: "Sasana-ika?" (Japanese: ささなイカ？)	November 23, 2010
When Squid Girl gets a fever, she has to rest in bed, but she thinks it's a special squid disease that makes her crave shrimp, so Eiko tries to help her stay off shrimp until she gets better. The gang try to figure out what Squid Girl's fins on her hat are used for. Squid Girl builds a weird sand castle that is mocked by Takeru's friend; then his friend's father arrives and tries to build a better sand castle. When Squid Girl and Eiko go into town to shop, Squid Girl becomes fascinated by umbrellas.
9	"Wanna doorbell ditch, squiddo? / Won't You Doorbell Ditch?"; Transliteration: "Pinpon Dasshu shina-ika?" (Japanese: ピンポンダッシュしなイカ？)	November 30, 2010
9	"Can squids put on make-up? / Won't You Try On Makeup?"; Transliteration: "Meiku shina-ika?" (Japanese: メイクしなイカ？)	November 30, 2010
9	"Holy squid! Is that a secret weapon? / Isn't That A Secret Weapon?"; Transliteration: "Himitsu Heiki ja na-ika?" (Japanese: 秘密兵器じゃなイカ？)	November 30, 2010
Trying to copy Takeru and his friend, Squid Girl tries to do a doorbell ditch but fails when Chizuru shows up as well as the homeowner, who has a daughter named Kiyomi Sakura in middle school that Squid Girl then spontaneously says she is friends with. Squid Girl invites Kiyomi over to the Aizawa household, but becomes paranoid that she will get punished for not asking permission. Later, Squid Girl tries on lipstick for the first time and becomes interested in all sorts of makeup. After that, Sanae and Cindy get into a fight over their respective desires for Squid Girl. Later, Harris, Clark, and Martin bring over a special device which turns out to be a ray gun that destroys the whole beach house.
10	"Isn't that a Teru Teru bosquid? / Isn't That Teru Teru Bozu?"; Transliteration: "Teruterubōzu ja na-ika?" (Japanese: てるてる坊主じゃなイカ？)	December 7, 2010
10	"What squidsn't there to like? / Won't You Be Loved?"; Transliteration: "Sukarena-ika?" (Japanese: 好かれなイカ？)	December 7, 2010
10	"One! Two! Three squids, you're out! / Won't You Play Baseball?"; Transliteration: "Yakyū shina-ika?" (Japanese: 野球しなイカ？)	December 7, 2010
On a rainy day, Squid Girl exhibits a talent for art, though the depictions of her friends are somewhat scary. Later, Eiko tells Sanae that she should give up on her crush on Squid Girl and try to become proper friends with her. However, holding herself back proves to be harder than Sanae thought. Later, when Kiyomi's baseball team falls short one member, Squid Girl decides to help her out. Though she initially has trouble with the game, her tentacles soon come into good use.
11	"I ink that's a doll? / Isn't That A Doll?"; Transliteration: "Ningyō ja na-ika?" (Japanese: 人形じゃなイカ？)	December 14, 2010
11	"Isn't That Fishy? / Isn't That Unlikely?"; Transliteration: "Giwaku ja na-ika?" (Japanese: 疑惑じゃなイカ？)	December 14, 2010
11	"Squids to match my mountains. / Won't You Go Hiking?"; Transliteration: "Tozan shina-ika?" (Japanese: 登山しなイカ？)	December 14, 2010
Eiko finds an old doll named Depp from her childhood that freaks Squid Girl out as it appears to move by itself overnight. As Eiko recalls that Depp is an alarm clock for the morning, and, as Eiko and Sanae wonder about the whereabouts of the other doll named Johnny, they remember that the two dolls were set as a reminder to wake up and lie down. Having witnessed her abilities first, Cindy starts to wonder if Chizuru is actually an alien and enlists the help of Harris, Clark, and Martin to gather some DNA, though the three have trouble approaching the situation. Later, Squid Girl and the Aizawas go on a hiking trip to the mountains, where Squid Girl's tentacles seem to attract the appetites of the wildlife. After a long hike, they meet Sanae, who tells them that she came via cable car.
12	"You feeling lucky, squid? / Won't You Fight?"; Transliteration: "Tatakawana-ika?" (Japanese: 戦わなイカ？)	December 21, 2010
12	"Quite the squidicament we're in. / Isn't This A Crisis?"; Transliteration: "Pinchi ja na-ika?" (Japanese: ピンチじゃなイカ？)	December 21, 2010
12	"An even worse squidicament! / Isn't This Still A Crisis?"; Transliteration: "Motto Pinchi ja na-ika?" (Japanese: もっとピンチじゃなイカ？)	December 21, 2010
A beach volleyball tournament is held with a 3D television as top prize and Squid Girl and Eiko decide to team up, managing to reach the finals against Gorō, who has teamed up with Tatsuo Isozaki. When Eiko twists her ankle during the match point, Chizuru takes her place and wins the competition. Later, Squid Girl's tentacles suddenly stop working, along with her other squid abilities, and the others try various methods to bring them back with no avail. Although the others suggest it would be alright if Squid Girl returns to the sea, everyone becomes lonely when she does not immediately return. Squid Girl later returns with her tentacles cut off, residing herself to being a normal girl, though Takeru makes it clear this is not what makes her happy. As Squid Girl laments on the beach, she meets a girl named Kozue Tanabe, who assures her not all humans are bad and that she is not alone. As Squid Girl and Eiko go swimming in the sea, they are caught in a whirlpool caused by Harris, Clark, and Martin, and Squid Girl's desire to save Eiko causes her tentacles to grow back, allowing her to rescue Eiko from drowning.

==== Bonus episodes ====
No.	Title	Original release date
1	"Mini Squid Girl Short Story Part 1"; Transliteration: "Mini Ika Musume Shōto Sutōrī Sono Ichi" (Japanese: ミニイカ娘 ショートストーリー その1)	April 20, 2011
While Eiko is out of the house, Mini-Squid Girl discovers another Mini-Squid Girl who causes her havoc throughout the house.
2	"Mini Squid Girl Short Story Part 2"; Transliteration: "Mini Ika Musume Shōto Sutōrī Sono Ni" (Japanese: ミニイカ娘 ショートストーリー その2)	May 18, 2011
While attempting to get a tasty looking shrimp at the Lemon, Mini-Squid Girl finds herself chased around by a lovestruck Sanae.

=== Shinryaku!? Ika Musume (2011) ===
No.	English title Original translated title	Original release date
1	"Who's Up For A Squid-vasion?! / Aren't You Going To Inkvade!?"; Transliteration: "Shinryaku shina-ika!?" (Japanese: 侵略しなイカ！？)	September 27, 2011
1	"Ink That's A Love Rival?! / Isn't That A Love Rival!?"; Transliteration: "Koigataki ja na-ika!?" (Japanese: 恋敵じゃなイカ！？)	September 27, 2011
1	"Making A Few Squid With Jellyfish / Isn't That A Jellyfish!?"; Transliteration: "Kurage ja na-ika!?" (Japanese: クラゲじゃなイカ!?)	September 27, 2011
After renewing her resolve to invade mankind, Squid Girl suspects various things to be countermeasures against her. Later, Kiyomi and her friends come to the Lemon to see Squid Girl, much to the dismay of a very jealous Sanae. When the sea becomes filled with jellyfish, the Lemon holds a contest to see who can catch the most jellyfish.
2	"Shall We Swim To An Elementary School?! / Won't You Go To Elementary School!?"; Transliteration: "Shōgakkō ni ikana-ika!?" (Japanese: 小学校に行かなイカ!?)	October 4, 2011
2	"Squid In Cosplay?! / Won't You Cosplay!?"; Transliteration: "Kosupure ja na-ika!?" (Japanese: コスプレじゃなイカ!?)	October 4, 2011
2	"Floating Above Sea Level / Aren't You Lighter!?"; Transliteration: "Karukuna-ika!?" (Japanese: 軽くなイカ!?)	October 4, 2011
Squid Girl joins Takeru to elementary school, where the teacher becomes jealous of her popularity. When some bullies take over the playground, Squid Girl challenges them to a game of soccer, which proves tricky without her tentacles. Later, Eiko tries dressing up Nagisa as a guy to attract female customers, which also stops Squid Girl's teasing. Ayumi also comes to work again, being dressed in a maid's outfit equipped with a metal knuckle to overcome her shyness. However, they both stop after Ayumi's father points out this isn't solving the core issues. Later, Eiko and Chizuru are surprised to find Squid Girl has the ability to change her weight at will, leading to some odd experiments.
3	"How About A Squiddle Walk?! / Won't You Go for a Walk!?"; Transliteration: "Sanpo shina-ika!?" (Japanese: 散歩しなイカ！？)	October 11, 2011
3	"Time To Squidzercise?! / Won't You Exercise!?"; Transliteration: "Taisō shina-ika!?" (Japanese: 体操しなイカ！？)	October 11, 2011
3	"Wanna Lend A Helping Tentacle?! / Won't You Help People!?"; Transliteration: "Tasukena-ika!?" (Japanese: 助けなイカ！？)	October 11, 2011
Noticing Sanae's dog Alex being jealous of Sanae constantly giving Squid Girl attention, Eiko suggests Squid Girl take him for a walk so they can bond. Though they don't initially get along, they help each other out when they are attacked by a ferocious dog. Later, Squid Girl observes some kids doing morning exercises and can't get them out of her head, leading to some trouble at work. Afterwards, Goro puts Squid Girl to work as a lifesaver, but after a couple of false starts, Goro doesn't trust her when she actually notices something dangerous in the water. However, after she manages to save some drowning kids, Goro understands that she protects the sea in her own way.
4	"Squidn't that English?! / Isn't That English!?"; Transliteration: "Ingurisshu ja na-ika!?" (Japanese: Englishじゃなイカ!?)	October 18, 2011
4	"Ink you can stop it?! / Won't You Stop it!?" Transliteration: "Tomena-ika!?" (Japanese: 止めなイカ！？)	October 18, 2011
4	"Get my drift?! / Isn't That a Stream!?"; Transliteration: "Nagarena-ika!?" (Japanese: 流れなイカ!?)	October 18, 2011
After Takeru has trouble understanding a tourist, Cindy holds an English-teaching session with Eiko being the only one who doesn't understand anything. (Note: In the English dub, Cindy teaches everyone how to speak in a British accent.) This leads to some communication errors as Cindy misinterprets Eiko's Japanese as English. Later, Squid Girl learns about tickling from Eiko and starts going around tickling others. However, she gets her comeuppance when she attempts to tickle Chizuru and ends up catching hiccups which she believes can only be cured if something makes her happy. Later, Squid Girl joins Takeru and the others by the river, where they have a race with grass boats. As Squid Girl follows her boat down the river, she winds up on a completely different beach.
5	"Squidn't That Be Radio-Controlled!? / Isn't That Radio-Controlled!?"; Transliteration: "Rajikon ja na-ika!?" (Japanese: ラジコンじゃなイカ!?)	November 1, 2011
5	"I Th-INK Today's the Tanabata Star Festival!? / Isn't That Tanabata!?"; Transliteration: "Tanabata ja na-ika!?" (Japanese: 七夕じゃなイカ!?)	November 1, 2011
5	"Want to INK-experience Playing Alone!? / Won't You Play By Yourself!?"; Transliteration: "Hitori Asobi shina-ika!?" (Japanese: 一人遊びしなイカ!?)	November 1, 2011
When Takeru buys a radio-controlled car, Squid Girl takes it outside for a drive, but ends up breaking it. Feeling guilty, she offers to be a replacement herself, but soon apologises for breaking it. Later, everyone writes down their wishes for Tanabata, with Squid Girl struggling to narrow her choices down to one wish. After Takeru finishes his summer homework, Squid Girl tries to help him find ways to play by himself.
6	"Wanna Do a Squiddle Jog!? / Won't You Go Jogging!?"; Transliteration: "Jogingu shina-ika!?" (Japanese: ジョギングしなイカ!?)	November 15, 2011
6	"INKsn't That My Bodyguard!? / Aren't You Special Police!?"; Transliteration: "SP ja na-ika!?" (Japanese: SPじゃなイカ!?)	November 15, 2011
6	"Wanna Go on an Esquidpade!? / Won't You Go On An Adventure!?"; Transliteration: "Bōken shina-ika!?" (Japanese: 冒険しなイカ!?)	November 15, 2011
Goro accompanies Chizuru on a lengthy jog while Eiko and Takeru take Squid Girl on a tour of the city, where she becomes shocked at the sight of a large Buddha statue. Later, Sanae decides to become Squid Girl's personal bodyguard so she can be around her all the time. However, her 'SP' self soon comes into conflict with her old perverted self. In another dream, Mini Squid Girl finds herself blown into the wilderness and goes on an adventure to find her way back home.
7	"Squidn't You Welcome Your Guests!? / Won't You Come For Dinner!?"; Transliteration: "Motenasana-ika!?" (Japanese: もてなさなイカ!?)	November 22, 2011
7	"INKsn't That Amnesia!? / Isn't That Amnesia!?"; Transliteration: "Kioku Sōshitsu jana-ika!?" (Japanese: 記憶喪失じゃなイカ!?)	November 22, 2011
7	"Want to Be Squid-nitiated Into Our Club!? / Won't You Join A Club!?"; Transliteration: "Nyūbu shina-ika!?" (Japanese: 入部しなイカ!?)	November 22, 2011
Ayumi's father invites the Aizawas to have dinner at his house, where Squid Girl and Eiko find his unique hospitality to be quite awkward. Later, Squid Girl falls down the stairs and loses her memory. As the others try to make up memories for her, she regains all but those of Sanae after she tries to force her hat off and sees her life flash before her eyes. Later, Squid Girl decides to set up an "Invasion Club" with Kiyomi and her friends, where they go out to various places to "invade." Squid Girl becomes worried about the club when Kiyomi becomes absent with a cold, but they all decide to visit her and invade her house too.
8	"Won't You be a House-Squidder!? / Won't You Watch The House!?"; Transliteration: "Rusuban shina-ika!?" (Japanese: 留守番しなイカ!?)	November 29, 2011
8	"Quitting Cold Squid!? / Won't You Quit!?"; Transliteration: "Tatana-ika!?" (Japanese: 断たなイカ!?)	November 29, 2011
8	"Aren't You INK-capacitated with Heat Stroke!? / Isn't That Heat Stroke!?"; Transliteration: "Netchūshō jana-ika!?" (Japanese: 熱中症じゃイカ!?)	November 29, 2011
As Squid Girl is put in charge of the house while everyone is away, she mistakes a burglar for Chizuru's father. After falling into another trap, Squid Girl tries to give up her craving for shrimp, but finds it hard to resist temptation. Later, both Squid Girl and Sanae collapse with heat stroke with Squid Girl becoming paranoid over what'll happen should Sanae recover first.
9	"Won't You Try Play-INK House!? / Won't You Play House!?"; Transliteration: "Omamagoto shina-ika!?" (Japanese: おままごとしなイカ！？)	December 6, 2011
9	"INKsn't That on Your Squid-dule!? / Won't You Keep A Schedule!?"; Transliteration: "Yotei ja na-ika!?" (Japanese: 予定じゃなイカ！？)	December 6, 2011
9	"Want to go to a Squid-musement Park!? / Won't You Go To An Amusement Park!?"; Transliteration: "Yūenchi ni ikana-ika!?" (Japanese: 遊園地に行かなイカ！？)	December 6, 2011
A girl named Risa asks Squid Girl and Eiko to play House with her, which becomes more complicated when Sanae and Kiyomi get cast as Squid Girl's lovers. Later, Eiko and Chizuru give Squid Girl a bag and schedule planner for her to make use out of, though she finds things don't always go to her scheduled plans. On the weekend, the Aizawas take Squid Girl to an amusement park they went to as kids, only to find it is closing down and the only ride left are the teacups. Despite the limited rides, the gang decides to stay with the park until the end, giving Eiko memories of being with her parents.
10	"Squid Meets Grill!? / Won't You Grill It!?"; Transliteration: "Yakana-ika!?" (Japanese: 焼かなイカ！？)	December 13, 2011
10	"Squidn't You Defend Yourself!? / Won't You Defend Yourself!?"; Transliteration: "Mamorana-ika!?" (Japanese: 護らなイカ！？)	December 13, 2011
10	"INKsn't That Way Too Cold!? / Isn't It Cold!?"; Transliteration: "Samukuna-ika!?" (Japanese: 寒くなイカ！？)	December 13, 2011
As the Aizawas get together to have yakiniku, between Squid Girl and Chizuru, Eiko can't get any beef for herself. Wanting to better handle herself around flirtatious boys, Ayumi takes some self-defense lessons from Chizuru, who demonstrates her techniques on Goro. On an extremely hot day, the Three Stooges equip the Lemon with a super powered air conditioner to attract customers, which soon turns the beach into a Winter wonderland, which quickly turns into a blizzard.
11	"Are You Using Hypno-squidism on ME!? / Isn't That Hypnotism!?"; Transliteration: "Saiminjutsu jana-ika!?" (Japanese: 催眠術じゃなイカ！？)	December 20, 2011
11	"Are they Join-INK Forces!? / Isn't That An Alliance!?"; Transliteration: "Kumana-ika!?" (Japanese: 組まなイカ！？)	December 20, 2011
11	"Squidn't the Two of Us Not Be Alone Together!? / Isn't It Just The Two Of Us!?"; Transliteration: "Futarikiri ja na-ika!?" (Japanese: ふたりきりじゃなイカ！？)	December 20, 2011
As Sanae practises hypnotism in the hopes of hypnotizing Squid Girl, the others play along with her. Although Sanae fails to make it work, Squid Girl is actually able to make it work, only to discover the coin she had been using was actually a device made by the Three Stooges. Later, the Southern Winds owner joins forces with the Three Stooges to make a robotic Squid Girl to once again challenge the real deal. Although it proves to be a match for Squid Girl, its technical shortcomings lead to its loss. Later, Squid Girl tries to make an effort to become more evil, but becomes concerned when Chizuru doesn't react to her misbehavings. The two end up going shopping and going to a restaurant together, where Chizuru expresses her wishes to be good friends with Squid Girl.
12	"Let's Do Some Train-INK!? / Won't You Practice!?"; Transliteration: "Kunren shina-ika!?" (Japanese: 訓練しなイカ！？)	December 27, 2011
12	"INKsn't That A Festival? (Part 1) / Isn't That A Festival!?"; Transliteration: "Matsuri ja na-ika!?" (Japanese: 祭りじゃなイカ！？)	December 27, 2011
12	"INKsn't That A Festival? (Part 2) / No Really, Isn't That A Festival!?"; Transliteration: "Yappari Matsuri ja na-ika!?" (Japanese: やっぱり祭りじゃなイカ！？)	December 27, 2011
Squid Girl practices her invasion plans on the Lemon shack; and the folks there play along. Realizing that Chizuru has been able to defend Lemon from other invaders (bugs or rats), Squid Girl trains harder on invading. Squid Girl gets into a fight with Eiko and it carries over to work. Chizuru has them go to a summer festival. Squid Girl ends up getting separated from her friends. As a shower hits, Eiko decides to search for her and meets Kozue, who helps her find and make up with Squid Girl.

=== Shinryaku!! Ika Musume (OVAs) ===
No.	English title Original translated title	Original release date
OVA–1	"Ink You Can Break It? / Won't It Break?"; Transliteration: "Kowasa na-ika?" (Japanese: 壊さなイカ？)	August 8, 2012
OVA–1	"Squidn't That Normal? / Isn't That Normal?"; Transliteration: "Futsū jana-ika?" (Japanese: 普通じゃなイカ？)	August 8, 2012
OVA–1	"Wanna Play Hide and Seak? / Won't You Hide?"; Transliteration: "Kakure na-ika?" (Japanese: 隠れなイカ？)	August 8, 2012
After breaking their own game console, the Three Stooges create a new handheld game console that won't break easily, giving some copies to Squid Girl and Eiko. However, they soon find the toughness of the console also makes it virtually unplayable, not helped by the selection of games on offer. Later, Ayumi reveals she has no problem conversing normally with Squid Girl and Chizuru because she doesn't consider them human. Not particularly pleased with that fact, Chizuru goes to extreme measures to try and convince people she is a normal human being. Later, Squid Girl decides to hide from the rest of the family in an attempt to surprise them, though is not too happy with them not showing much concern for her.
OVA–2	"Is That a Squiddie Pool? / Isn't That an Inflatable Pool?"; Transliteration: "Binīru Pūru jana-ika?" (Japanese: ビニールプールじゃなイカ?)	June 7, 2013
OVA–2	"Squidn't This Your Mom? / Isn't That His Mother?"; Transliteration: "Kaa-chan jana-ika?" (Japanese: 母ちゃんじゃなイカ?)	June 7, 2013
OVA–2	"Inking a Message in a Bottle? / Isn't That a Message in a Bottle?"; Transliteration: "Messēji Bottoru jana-ika?" (Japanese: メッセージボトルじゃなイカ?)	June 7, 2013
The Aikawas blow up an inflatable pool for Squid Girl, which she decides to put on the roof for privacy, only to end up sliding out to sea when it starts raining. Later, Goro faces embarrassment when his mother stops by the beach. Afterwards, Squid Girl becomes interested in sending a message in a bottle, only to find her bottle keeps washing back onto the shore, so the Three Stooges try to invent a rocket that will launch it far out to sea.
OVA–3	"Isn't That a Helper?"; Transliteration: "Suketto jana-ika?" (Japanese: 助っ人じゃなイカ?)	September 9, 2014
OVA–3	"Won't You Be Found Out?"; Transliteration: "Bare na-ika?" (Japanese: バレなイカ?)	September 9, 2014
OVA–3	"Aren't You a Police Officer?"; Transliteration: "Keisatsukan jana-ika?" (Japanese: 警察官じゃなイカ?)	September 9, 2014
The Southern Winds Owner is brought in to fill in for Chizuru at the Lemon, where his talent and cooking is outweighed by his robotic Fake Squid Girl blowing up in everyone's faces. However, he does manage to help out Squid Girl when she is chased by some hungry dogs. Later, Sanae attempts to hide her collection of Squid Girl memorabilia from Kiyomi when she comes round to visit, but gets found out when she returns for her bag. Instead of becoming disgusted with her, however, Kiyomi becomes impressed by Sanae's talent. Afterwards, a police officer named Keiko Furukawa comes by the Lemon, initially becoming suspicious of Squid Girl but soon befriending her.
