= Mushi-Uta =

Japanese light novel and anime series

- Cover of the first light novel

ムシウタ (Mushiuta)
- Light novel
- Written by: Kyouhei Iwai
- Illustrated by: Llo
- Published by: Kadokawa Shoten
- Imprint: Kadokawa Sneaker Bunko
- Original run: May 1, 2003 – May 1, 2014
- Volumes: 16
- Light novel

Mushi-Uta bug
- Written by: Kyouhei Iwai
- Illustrated by: Llo
- Published by: Kadokawa Shoten
- Imprint: Kadokawa Sneaker Bunko
- Magazine: The Sneaker
- Original run: December 27, 2003 – August 30, 2008
- Volumes: 8
- Manga
- Written by: Kyouhei Iwai
- Illustrated by: Seijuro Miz
- Published by: Kadokawa Shoten
- Magazine: Shōnen Ace
- Original run: March 26, 2007 – October 26, 2007
- Volumes: 2
- Anime television series
- Directed by: Kazuo Sakai
- Produced by: Makoto Chiba; Tomoko Kawasaki; Tomoko Suzuki; Ryōsuke Hiramitsu; Yoshifumi Kominato; Yoshiteru Yamaguchi
- Written by: Reiko Yoshida
- Music by: Junpei Fujita
- Studio: Beat Frog (animation); Zexcs (production)
- Original network: WOWOW
- Original run: July 6, 2007 – October 5, 2007
- Episodes: 12

Mushi-Uta (Japanese: ムシウタ, Hepburn: Mushiuta; "Song of Insects") is a Japanese light novel series written by Kyouhei Iwai and illustrated by Llo. There is also a short story series called Mushi-Uta bug that is serialized in The Sneaker magazine. A manga adaptation by Seijuro Miz is serialized in Shōnen Ace magazine. An anime television series adaptation written by Reiko Yoshida and directed by Kazuo Sakai began airing on July 6, 2007.

== Plot ==
Mushi-Uta's story takes place in the near future. Ten years before the story's opening, strange insect-like creatures known as "Mushi" began appearing. The Mushi are able to consume people's dreams and thoughts in return for supernatural powers. At the end of episode one, protagonist Daisuke "Kakkō" Kusuriya encounters a young girl named Shiika Anmoto. The two, in time, become quite close. However, unbeknownst to Kakkō, Shiika is an escapee from a secret prison known as GARDEN where those possessed by the Mushi, known as the Mushitsuki, are held. GARDEN's military force, the Special Environmental Conservation Executive Office, dispatches its finest killer to track down Shiika. However, they are faced with resistance from the Mushibane resistance organisation, led by the secretive "Ladybug".

== Characters ==
Daisuke Kusuriya (薬屋 大助, Kusuriya Daisuke)
Voiced by: Shintarō Asanuma
The main protagonist, he is believed by most hosts to be the most powerful among them. His alias is "Kakkō" (かっこう; lit. Cleridae). Years ago, he shot Shiika's mushi, and promised her to make her dream come true. However, he does not seem to realize that Shiika was the girl he made the promise to. He has a sister named Chiharu, whose whereabouts are currently unknown. His mushi can synchronize with his gun and his body, increase the range and power of the gun and grant him super human strength, speed and durability. It is hinted that the more powerful he makes the bullet, the more his dreams or energy is drained. He has feelings for Shiika and treasures her dearly.
Shiika Anmoto (杏本 詩歌, Anmoto Shiika)
Voiced by: Kana Hanazawa
Thought to be one of the most dangerous host. Her mushi, "Fuyuhotaru" (ふゆほたる; lit. 'Winter Firefly'), was killed by Daisuke years prior to the main story. After she regained her memories and emotions, she escaped GARDEN, and was found by Daisuke. She now lives in Rina's house and goes by the alias "Snow Fly" (スノウ·フライ, Sunō Furai) within Mushibane. Her mushi power is Substance Metamorph (Anything, when they are touched by the snowflakes produced by Shiika's (Mushi), will not able to keep its original shape. Within the range of snowflakes falling, Shiika had the power of overwhelm and complete destruction) where the mushi shines like a bright ball and is able to cause heavy impacts with high velocity tackles. Furthermore, it can create a snow storm that kills other mushi in it, presumably by high atmospheric pressure. She is stabbed by a mushi and ends up in the hospital. At the end of season 1, Kakkou tells her that "Next Christmas, wait for me at the planetarium. I can't meet you yet, but I will definitely go."
Rina Tachibana (立花 利奈, Tachibana Rina)
Voiced by: Hitomi Nabatame
Daisuke's classmate, and the leader of Mushibane. After seeing Shiika, she let her stay in her house. She has a crush on Daisuke, unaware of his true identity or his feelings for Shiika. According to Daisuke, she reminds him of his older sister. Her alias is "Lady" (レイディー, Reidī) and her mushi power is to summon her giant ladybug nicknamed "Nanahoshi" (means 7 stars). She is able to ride Nanahoshi to fly. Her most powerful attack used on a berserk Centi seems to be a highspeed sonic slash.
Keigo Haji (土師 圭吾, Haji Keigo)
Voiced by: Daisuke Hirakawa
Leader of the SEPB branch on Ouka city. His sister lives by eating away his dreams, a fact only known to him and Daisuke.
Tōko Gorōmaru (五郎丸 柊子, Gorōmaru Tōko)
Voiced by: Reiko Takagi
Haji's ditzy secretary. She mainly serves to lighten the mood when Haji and Kakkō (or other SEPB members) are talking in a serious tone.
Azusa Horizaki (堀崎 梓, Horizaki Azusa)
Voiced by: Yukari Tamura
A double agent working for both Haji and Mushibane. Her true intention is to defeat Kakkō and take his place as Haji's right hand, whom she is in love with. Her alias is "Minmin" (みんみん), and her mushi power involves spying as her cicada acts as a tapping device. It also has the ability to shoot small lasers and somehow grants Minmin the power to fly and float. Her mushi is later killed by Shiika's mushi, Fuyuhotaru.

== Media ==
=== Anime ===
No.	Title	Original air date
1	"The Beginning of the Dream" "Yume no Hajimari" (夢ノ始マリ)	July 6, 2007
A Mushitsuki by the name of Yuki is hunted down and killed by the Special Environmental Conservation Executive Office. The Mushibane almost save him, but eventually fail. In the second half of the episode, Kakkō is introduced to his new school as Daisuke Kusuriya, and the episode concludes with the meeting between Kakkō and Shiika.
2	"The Dream's Bond" "Yume no Kizuna" (夢ノ絆)	July 13, 2007
Kakkō and Shiika start to get to know each other better, whilst Kakkō's classmates start to get somewhat curious about his relationship with Shiika. The episode also shows us Shīka's background, how she discovered her powers as a Mushitsuki and her arrest by SEPB.
3	"Prisoners of the Dream" "Yume no Torikotachi" (夢ノ虜タチ)	July 20, 2007
Daisuke and Shiika meet again at the city's Kaihin Park. Unknown to the pair, both Mushibane and SEPB are there too. SEPB surrounds both groups and attempts to detain them, although Mushibane manage to fend them off.
4	"Crushed Dream" "Kudakechiru Yume" (砕ケ散ル夢)	July 27, 2007
While struggling to protect Rina, Centi's mushi enters the maturation process and becomes a giant monster, and she finds no option but to take it down in order to save Centi's life.
5	"A Chance Meeting of Dream" "Meguriau Yume" (巡リ会ウ夢)	August 2, 2007
After the incident at the park, Shiika ends up finding shelter at Rina's place. While getting used to her new life, she and Kakkō reminisce about the day when they first met.
6	"Targeted Dream" "Newawareta Yume" (狙ワレタ夢)	August 10, 2007
Rina grants Shiika's request to visit her school, while one of her friends starts to experience some strange phenomena.
7	"Dream Labyrinth" "Yume no Meiso" (夢ノ迷路)	August 16, 2007
Three new hunters from SEPB are sent into Ōka to aid in the search for Shiika. Meanwhile, Asami also discovers the truth about her.
8	"Unfulfilled Dreams" "Mihatenuyume" (見果テヌ夢)	August 24, 2007
Kasuo pursues Asami into digital space, where Kakkō narrowly saves her. Asami and Kasuo escape from digital space, but Kakkō is left behind. The next day, Kasuo destroys Asami's Mushi, causing her to become one of the Fallen.
9	"Fragment of Dreams" "Yume no Kakera" (夢ノ欠片)	September 14, 2007
Shiika and Daisuke go on a date to the planetarium, but when they are seen together by Rina, each girl realizes the other's feelings for him. In the same occasion, both Daisuke and Rina discovered Shiika's true identity.
10	"Passing Dreams" "Surechigau Yume" (スレ違ウ夢)	September 21, 2007
Rina learns from Minmin about GARDEN's location, and determined to rescue the fallen imprisoned there by herself, she leaves Shiika to the care of her Mushibane fellows. Knowing she is actually walking into a trap, Daisuke tries to dissuade her.
11	"Endless Dream" "Owaranai Yume" (終ワラナイ夢)	September 28, 2007
While Rina is surrounded by Haji's forces at GARDEN, Shiika ends up alone to defend herself against Minmin and Kabuto. Just when Kakkō is about to fight Rina's mushi, who entered in maturation, one of the Originals appears before him.
12	"Dreaming Firefly" "Yume Miru Hotaru" (夢ミル蛍)	October 5, 2007
Kakkō manages to retrieve Rina from inside her mushi, but it was too late for her. While he struggles against Nanahoshi, Haji ends up seriously hurt and a wounded Shiika fights to stop her mushi from going berserk too.

== See also ==
- Unbreakable Machine-Doll, another light novel series illustrated by the same illustrator.
- Oreshura, another light novel series illustrated by the same illustrator.
- Reincarnated as a Sword, another light novel series illustrated by the same illustrator.
