= Yoake Mae yori Ruriiro na =

Japanese adult visual novel

- Yoake Mae yori Ruriiro na original visual novel cover

夜明け前より瑠璃色な
- Genre: Romance, Science fiction
- Video game
- Developer: August (Windows); Aria, HuneX (PS2, PSP)
- Publisher: Hazuki (Windows); Aria (PS2); Kadokawa Shoten (PSP)
- Genre: Visual novel
- Platform: Windows, PS2, PSP
- Released: September 22, 2005
- Light novel
- Written by: Tasuku Saika
- Illustrated by: Bekkankō
- Published by: Harvest
- Imprint: Harvest Novels
- Original run: May 2006 – November 2006
- Volumes: 7
- Manga
- Written by: August
- Illustrated by: Hoehoe Nōmiso
- Published by: MediaWorks
- Magazine: Dengeki Daioh
- Original run: November 2005 – May 2007
- Volumes: 2
- Anime television series

Brighter Than the Dawning Blue: Crescent Love
- Directed by: Masahiko Ohta
- Written by: Takashi Aoshima
- Music by: Hiroyuki Sawano
- Studio: Daume
- Licensed by: NA: Sentai Filmworks
- Original network: BS-i
- Original run: October 4, 2006 – December 20, 2006
- Episodes: 12

Yoake Mae yori Ruriiro na (夜明け前より瑠璃色な; lit. A Brighter Blue Than That Before the Dawn), also known as Crescent Love, is a Japanese adult visual novel developed by August and first released on September 22, 2005, for Windows. It was later ported to the PlayStation 2 and PlayStation Portable. A manga illustrated by Hoehoe Nōmiso was serialized in Dengeki Daioh between the November 2005 and May 2007 issues. A 12-episode anime adaptation titled Yoake Mae yori Ruriiro na: Crescent Love aired in Japan between October and December 2006. The anime is licensed by Sentai Filmworks in North America and was released on June 1, 2010.

== Gameplay ==
Yoake Mae yori Ruriiro na is a romance visual novel in which the player assumes the role of Tatsuya Asagiri. Its gameplay requires little player interaction as much of the game's duration is spent on reading the text that appears on the screen, which represents the story's narrative and dialogue. The text is accompanied by character sprites, which represent who Tatsuya is talking to, over background art. Throughout the game, the player encounters CG artwork at certain points in the story, which take the place of the background art and character sprites. Yoake Mae yori Ruriiro na follows a branching plot line with multiple endings, and depending on the decisions that the player makes during the game, the plot will progress in a specific direction.

There are seven main plot lines that the player will have the chance to experience, one for each of the heroines in the story. Every so often, the player will come to a point where he or she is given the chance to choose from multiple options. Text progression pauses at these points until a choice is made. To view all plot lines in their entirety, the player will have to replay the game multiple times and choose different choices to further the plot to an alternate direction. After the completion of the six heroine routes, the final scenario called Yoake Mae yori Ruriiro na is made available. Throughout gameplay, there are scenes with sexual CGs depicting Tatsuya and a given heroine having sex.

== Plot ==
Yoake Mae yori Ruriiro na centers on Princess Feena Fam Earthlight from the Kingdom of Sphere on Earth's moon. It was decided that she was to live on Earth in a homestay with the family of the primary secretary to the president of the United Nations so as to get more knowledgeable of Earth in order to better prepare herself for her succession as the Kingdom of Sphere's next queen.

The background of the story explains that humans landed on the Moon long ago intending to create a new home for themselves called the Kingdom of Sphere. However, the relations between Earth and the Kingdom have worsened things and a war called the Oedipus war started. Once the war was over, it was decided that the city of Mitsurugasaki in Shizuoka Prefecture of Japan, where the story takes place, under the rule of the United Nations, be developed as the center of diplomacy with the Lunar Kingdom, which, currently, has closed its doors to the world. This central lunar junction port city, which has the only spaceport within the United Nations with ships going to and coming from the Lunar Embassy, is, as its name suggests, the gateway which connects the Earth and the Moon. Although tensions have temporarily eased now, relations between the two worlds is still in a situation when the story begins where caution must still be taken.

== Characters ==
=== Main characters ===
Tatsuya Asagiri (朝霧 達哉, Asagiri Tatsuya)
Voiced by: Kouichi Tsukasa (Drama CD) / Susumu Chiba (anime)
Tatsuya is the main male protagonist in the story. He is very knowledgeable about the Moon and the Kingdom of Sphere because he has been interested in it since he was very young. He has this odd unconscious habit of pinching girls on the nose as a sign of affection. Tatsuya constantly finds enjoyment in teasing Natsuki about random things. He is quite loyal toward Feena and her aim to fulfill her mother's dream to reunite the Earth and Moon. Though somewhat apprehensive about the homestay, Tatsuya eventually falls in love with the princess and their union cements the alliance between the two worlds.

Feena Fam Earthlight (フィーナ·ファム·アーシュライト, Fīna Famu Āshuraito)
Voiced by: Maki Tezuka (PC) / Hitomi Nabatame (PS2/anime)
Feena is the princess of the Kingdom of Sphere on the Moon and also the main female protagonist. In order to become more knowledgeable about Earth and be able to follow in her mother's footsteps, she comes to Earth in a homestay with the family of the primary secretary to the president of the United Nations, Sayaka Hozumi. Since she was very young, she has always wanted to know more about the Earth and some day she hopes to surpass her mother in trying to bridge the gap between the Earth and the Kingdom of Sphere. She is well educated in terms of literature and science and has great sword skills. However, she is somewhat naive in matters of the heart and has a tendency to jump into situations without thinking, (such as jumping into a river to save a drowning puppy, without knowing how to swim, and mistaking moths for aliens). Feena once came to Earth when she was a child, and met Tatsuya previously after her mother's death, in which Tatsuya tried to comfort her. She eventually falls in love with him and later marries him to finally bring peace between the Earth and the Moon.

Mia Clementis (ミア·クレメンティス, Mia Kurementisu)
Voiced by: Mia Naruse (PC) / Mio Nonose (PS2/anime)
Mia is Feena's main escort from the Kingdom of Sphere and always tries to look out for the princess. More or less, she is a maid who serves the princess but does not always do what she is told. She is a bit of an airhead, though all of her efforts are genuinely for Feena's well-being and happiness.

Mai Asagiri (朝霧 麻衣, Asagiri Mai)
Voiced by: Oto Agumi (PC) / Mai Goto (PS2/anime)
Mai is Tatsuya's younger sister who attends the same school as him. She is the part leader for the flutes in the concert band in her school. She is actually adopted and looks younger than she is.

Natsuki Takamizawa (鷹見沢 菜月, Takamizawa Natsuki)
Voiced by: Erena Kaibara (PC) / Hyo-sei (PS2/anime)
Natsuki is one of Tatsuya's closest friends and is also one of his classmates. She works with Tatsuya at her father's restaurant, Trattoria Samon, which also happens to be next door to Tatsuya's house. She often gets angry at Tatsuya or her brother when they tease her. She is best known as the Carbon Master, due to her inability to cook and all her attempts ending up as blackened messes (including salad).

Sayaka Hozumi (穂積 さやか, Hozumi Sayaka)
Voiced by: Mina Motoyama (PC) / Nami Kurokawa (PS2/anime)
In the visual novel, Sayaka is a deputy librarian in the royal moon museum. Tatsuya and Mai refer to her as their older sister, although she is actually their cousin. In the anime, Sayaka is the primary secretary to the president of the United Nations so in effect has a lot of ties with the politics that is involved between Earth and the Kingdom of Sphere. Her nickname in the media is the "President's Dagger".

Wreathlit Noel (リースリット·ノエル, Rīsuritto Noeru)
Voiced by: Rina Misaki (PC) / Shizuka Ito (PS2/anime)
A mysterious being from the Moon, Wreathlit, generally known as Wreath, appears to be a young child but is actually much older. She is constantly watching Feena, especially in Feena's story path where she is in love with Tatsuya; her split personality, Lady Fiacca, tells her that the Moon and Earth must not be united. However, in the end, Fiacca departs forever after seeing the result Tatsuya and Feena's efforts and breaking the cycle of hatred between the two worlds.

Midori Tōyama (遠山 翠, Midori Tōyama)
Voiced by: Himeno Miyabi (PC) / Naoko Takano (PS2/anime)
Midori is an energetic girl in Tatsuya's class who has been one of his classmates since their first year in high school. She is the clarinet leader in the concert band at her school. She seems to be very desperate for Tatsuya's odd sign of affection or even perhaps noticing her once in a while. She is only available as a love interest in the PS2 and PSP versions of the game, and is otherwise a minor character.

Estel Freesia (エステル·フリージア, Esuteru Furījia)
Voiced by: Michiru Yuimoto (PS2) / Fūri Samoto (Moonlight Cradle)
A mysterious, bookish and religious girl. Estel appears in PS2 and PSP version of the game and the sequel Moonlight Cradle only.

=== Secondary characters ===
Karen Clavius (カレン·クラヴィウス, Karen Kuraviusu)
Voiced by: Ryouko Hazakura (PC) / Yu Asakawa (PS2/anime)
Karen is the Military Ambassador of the Kingdom of Sphere. She seems to have a fairly strict attitude on things which fits her profession well.

Jin Takamizawa (鷹見沢 仁, Takamizawa Jin)
Voiced by: Haruhiko Tsujimiya (PC) / Katsuyuki Konishi (PS2) / Daisuke Kishio (anime)
Jin is Natsuki's older brother and is also one of her co-workers at the restaurant that their father owns. He constantly makes his sister angry when at work which gets him thrown out of the restaurant, usually breaking a window on the way out. Everything he breaks due to this act is taken out of his paycheck.

Samon Takamizawa (鷹見沢 左門, Takamizawa Samon)
Voiced by: Zenshū Iwao (PC) / Yousuke Akimoto (PS2) / Negishi Akira (anime)
The main chef and owner of Trattoria Samon, the restaurant where Samon and his two children, Natsuki and Jin, work. He tends to be a fair boss to his employees who do not have a problem with him as their boss. Samon admires Takeshi Takano's work as a photographer and even was able to get his autograph in the first episode of the anime.

Lyones theo Earthlight (ライオネス·テオ·アーシュライト, Raionesu Teo Āshuraito)
Voiced by: Souichi Yamanaka (PC) / Masashi Hirose (PS2) / Masashi Kimura (anime)
Feena's father and king of the Kingdom of Sphere on the Moon. He was a commoner student at the Lunar College and his romance with the Princess Cefilia had caused an uproar. It was due to the encouragement of Tatsuya's father that Lyones summoned up the courage to date and later marry the princess.

Cefilia fam Earthlight (セフィリア·ファム·アーシュライト, Sefiria Famu Āshuraito)
Voiced by: Hitomi Nabatame (anime)
Feena's dead mother; only seen in photos and flashbacks, Sefiria's influence is still felt on the Earth and the Moon. She greatly amended the relationship between the planet and its natural satellite.

Chiharu Asagiri
Tatsuya's father. He is a traveling archaeologist, who spends months at a time traveling. Many times, the children do not see him at home for months. In the anime, he is portrayed as an Indiana Jones look alike.

Cynthia Marguerite (シンシア·マルグリット, Shinshia Maruguritto)
Voiced by: Soyogi Tōno (Moonlight Cradle)
Cynthia only appears in the "Yoake Mae yori Ruriiro na -Moonlight Cradle-". Fiacca Marguerite's 2 years younger sister.

Fiacca Marguerite (フィアッカ·マルグリット, Fiakka Maruguritto)
Cynthia's older sister.

=== Anime original characters ===
Takeshi Takano (高野 武, Takano Takeshi)
Voiced by: Shinpachi Tsuji (anime)
Usually referred to as Takano, he is a world famous photographer known also as the "great master". Takano, who also happens to have quite a few connections with the Kingdom of Sphere, was the only person approved by Feena's father to document her studies on Earth, just as he had done with her mother and grandmother. He also has the unique ability to pop up out of almost anywhere without being noticed, which makes getting the photographs he needs quite easy. Takano has an assistant that follows him around, helping him develop photos or to function as a quick getaway. He's a bit of a pervert and always seem to appear at the most embarrassing of times.

Jürgen von Klügel (ユルゲン·フォン·クリューゲル, Yurugen fon Kuryūgeru)
Voiced by: Takashi Kondō (anime)
He is the son of one of the noble families of the Kingdom of Sphere. He was initially chosen to be Feena's fiancé, but she instead falls in love with Tatsuya. Unlike the princess, Jürgen hates the people of the Earth, thinking them to be inferior, and wants to re-start the war between the two worlds. He attempts a coup d'etat of the Royal Family, and in total desperation, tries to kill Feena. In the end, Tatsuya prevents the attempted assassination and Jürgen is arrested for treason.

== Development and release ==
Yoake Mae yori Ruriiro na is the fifth title developed by the visual novel developer August. The project was overseen by game director Rune, and the scenario was written by four people. Taku Sakakibara, Hiroyuki Uchida, Hideaki Anzai and Runa Okada. Character design and art direction for the game was provided by Bekkankō, and CG supervision was handled by Fujihisa Satomi. The game's background music was produced by members of Active Planets.

Yoake Mae yori Ruriiro na was released as a limited edition on September 22, 2005, for Windows; the regular edition was released on December 22, 2005. Aria and HuneX released a PlayStation 2 (PS2) port titled Yoake Mae yori Ruriiro na: Brighter than dawning blue on December 7, 2006, which removed the adult elements of the game and introduced two additional heroines. The PS2 version was later ported back to Windows titled Yoake Mae yori Ruriiro na: Brighter than dawning blue for PC on September 18, 2009. A sequel to the story established in the PS2 version titled Yoake Mae yori Ruriiro na: Moonlight Cradle was released as a limited edition on February 27, 2009, for Windows; the regular edition was released on September 18, 2009. Premium packs were later released containing both Brighter than dawning blue and Moonlight Cradle. Aria released a PlayStation Portable port titled Yoake Mae yori Ruriiro na: Portable on February 25, 2010. A version compatible with Windows 7 was released on July 29, 2011.

== Adaptations ==
The cabbage in question in both the TV (top) and DVD (bottom) versions of the anime. Note the leaves on the cabbage in the TV version were drawn as concentric circles and the cabbage itself drawn as a smooth sphere. The cabbage in the DVD version was drawn more correctly.

=== Drama CDs ===
A set of six drama CDs were created based on the video game Yoake Mae yori Ruriiro na -Brighter than dawning blue-, entitled Yoake Mae Yori Ruriiro na ~Fairy tale of Luna~ #1-6 (夜明け前より瑠璃色な〜Fairy tale of Luna〜 #1-6) released between April 21, 2006, and September 22, 2006, at roughly one-month intervals by Marine Entertainment. Two additional drama CDs based on the anime adaptation were released on October 25, 2006, and December 22, 2006, respectively.

=== Print media ===
A seven volume light novel series, written by Tasuku Saika and illustrated by Bekkankō, was published between May 1 and November 1, 2006. Three volumes of a collection of short stories serialized in Dengeki G's Magazine titled Official Heroine Story: Yoake Mae yori Ruriiro na Koisuru Shunkan, written by Runa Okada and illustrated by Bekkankō, Mika Takeda and Keitarō Kawagashi, were released between September 30, 2006, and March 30, 2007. A light novel titled Yoake Mae yori Ruriiro: Lavender Eyes, written by Saya Amō and illustrated by Bekkankō, was published on December 20, 2006.

A manga illustrated by Hoehoe Nōmiso was serialized in MediaWorks' Dengeki Daioh magazine between the November 2005 and May 2007 issues. Two tankōbon volumes were released: the first on September 27, 2006, and the second on May 26, 2007.

=== Anime ===
Directed by Masahiko Ohta and written by Takashi Aoshima, a 12-episode anime adaptation of Yoake Mae yori Ruriiro na was animated by Daume titled Yoake Mae yori Ruriiro na: Crescent Love. It aired between October 4 and December 20, 2006, on TBS Japan. Sentai Filmworks distributed the anime as Brighter Than the Dawning Blue. The original soundtrack for the anime was released on January 26, 2007, by Geneon Entertainment with 28 tracks.

A badly animated cabbage in the third episode generated an Internet meme in Japan where people on 2chan posted fanart of Feena with the spherical cabbage with concentric leaves and, changing two kanji symbols, referred to the series as Brighter than Dawning Green -Cabbage Love- (夜明け前より黄緑色な -Cabbage Love-, Yoake mae yori kimidori iro na -Cabbage Love-). Eventually, the DVD version of the anime was given a smoother look and visibly better animation (albeit without a change in storyline). The aforementioned badly-drawn cabbage was also redrawn correctly.

==== Episode list ====
No.	Title	Original release date
1	"The Princess Does a Homestay?!" "Ohime-sama ga Hōmusutei!?" (お姫様がホームステイ!?)	October 4, 2006
An introduction about the story is shown. Princess Feena Fam Earthlight from the Moon, otherwise known as the Kingdom of Sphere, comes to Earth to participate in a homestay with Tatsuya's family.
2	"The Princess is an A-Student!" "Ohime-sama wa Yūtōsei!" (お姫様は優等生!)	October 11, 2006
Princess Feena is admitted into Tatsuya's school and own classroom and at first everyone is very intimidated by her reputation as the Kingdom of Sphere's princess.
3	"The Princess and the Cooking Battle!" "Ohime-sama Ryōri Taiketsu!!" (お姫様料理対決!!)	October 18, 2006
Feena and Natsuki are matched against each other in a cooking contest after Feena helps out at Trattoria Samon. The infamous cabbage makes his appearance.
4	"Fight, O Princess!" "Tatakau! Ohime-sama" (戦う!お姫様)	October 25, 2006
Before Feena and Tatsuya go to school they stop by a river. Feena jumps in the river in an attempt to save a drowning puppy, but she does not know how to swim. Tatsuya almost performs CPR on Feena when she spits out the water. After being shown Tatsuya's father's study, Feena mistakes the infestation of bugs for invading hostile aliens which ends with the obliteration of the study itself.
5	"The Princess Marooned on a Desert Island!" "Ohime-sama Mujintō Hyōryūki" (お姫様無人島漂流記)	November 1, 2006
Everyone goes on a vacation to the beach, and they get stuck in a 'deserted' island and become castaways.
6	"The Princess is Forbidden to Fall in Love?!" "Ohime-sama wa Ren'ai Kinshi!?" (お姫様は恋愛禁止!?)	November 8, 2006
Tatsuya and Feena are starting to have feelings between each other. At the same time, a young girl named Wreath is sent by a mysterious person named Feyaka to stop Feena and Tatsuya from developing their relationship further.
7	"The Princess's Fiancé!" "Ohime-sama no Iinazuke" (お姫様の許婚)	November 15, 2006
Feena decides to move out of Tatsuya's house in order to perform her princess duties at the embassy. Later, Feena's fiancé arrive on Earth and Tatsuya must decide what happens concerning him and Feena.
8	"With the Princess Beneath the Bright Blue Sky" "Ohime-sama to Ruri-iro no Sora no Shita de..." (お姫様と瑠璃色の空の下で...)	November 22, 2006
Tatsuya and Feena have confessed their love to each other. Everyone except Karen accepted their relationship. Karen set up a challenge which Tatsuya having to defeat Feena in a kendo match.
9	"The Shadow That Approaches the Princess" "Ohime-sama ni Semaru Kage" (お姫様に迫る影)	November 29, 2006
Tatsuya and Feena's relationship continues to grow stronger as Karen informs the King of the Kingdom of Sphere about the situation. For her actions, Karen is arrested by the military for treason. Later, while on a date, Wreathlit attacks Tatsuya and Feena in order to prevent a war between the two worlds.
10	"A Princess With Just One Wing" "Katayoku dake no Ohime-sama" (片翼だけのお姫様)	December 6, 2006
After Karen is arrested, Feena goes back to the Moon alone in order to prevent anything more from happening. While there, Feena's father is reminded about the past when he and Cephilia fell in love and the controversy it stirred.
11	"That Hand Placed Atop the Princess's" "Ohime-sama to Sono Te o Kasane" (お姫様とその手を重ね)	December 13, 2006
Karen and Tatsuya land on the Moon but are still being chased by guards of the palace. Meanwhile Jurgen accelerates things and a war between the Earth and the Moon seems imminent.
12	"The Princess and..." "Ohime-sama to..." (お姫様と...)	December 20, 2006
Feena and Tatsuya with the help of Takano and Karen manage to turn the tables on the situation and the war is averted. A few years later, Tatsuya and Feena are married and Feena's mother's dream has come true for the Moon and Earth to unite.

== See also ==
- The Tale of the Bamboo Cutter
