= Mia Naruse =

Japanese voice actress

Mia Naruse (成瀬未亜, Naruse Mia; born February 11), also known as Mio Nonose (野々瀬 ミオ, Nonose Mio), is a Japanese voice actress from Tokyo, Japan. On April 30, 2010, she announced that she would not be voice acting anymore. However, on April 16, 2013, she announced that she had resumed her voice acting career on her blog.

In 2018, it was announced that she would become a VTuber named Miazu, and would partner with fellow voice actor Tomoe Tamiyasu to create a dual VTuber channel. In 2019, she appeared in Kampani Girls.

== Anime cast in ==
- Demonbane as Ennea
- Happiness! as Anri Hiiragi
- H_{2}O: Footprints in the Sand as Otoha
- Moekan as Rinia
- In Search of the Lost Future as Neko Yamaga
- Crescent Love as Mia Clementis
- Shukufuku no Campanella as Salsa Tortilla

== Video games ==
- Clover Heart's: Looking for Happiness as Airi Momose
- Nekopara as Azuki
- "Pastel" as Yukino Kusanagi
- Wonderful Everyday as Otonashi Ayana
