= Fujiko Takimoto =

Japanese voice actress

- 瀧本 富士子
- Born: Osaka Prefecture, Japan
- Occupation: Voice actress
- Years active: 1990–present
- Agent: Arts Vision
- Spouse: Hideki Ogihara (m. 2014)

Fujiko Takimoto (瀧本 富士子, Takimoto Fujiko) is a Japanese voice actress. She has been married to her Mahoromatic co-star Hideki Ogihara on February 2, 2014.

== Filmography ==
=== Anime ===
- Mahoujin Guru Guru (1994) (Nike)
- Captain Tsubasa J (1994) (Sanae Nakazawa)
- Kiko-chan Smile (1996) (Masacado)
- Kirby: Right Back at Ya! (2001) (Tokkori)
- Inazuma Eleven: Ares (2018) (Fūsuke Suzuno)

=== Unknown date ===
- Bakuto Sengen Daigunder (Akira Akebono)
- B'TX (Gaku)
- Buzzer Beater (Hideyoshi)
- Bonobono (Chibisuke to Okera-kun)
- Crayon Shin-chan (Nurse)
- Case Closed (Makoto Kyogoku (young))
- Gravitation (Suguru Fujisaki)
- Go! Go! Itsutsugo Land (Kabuto Morino)
- Hell Teacher: Jigoku Sensei Nube (Meisuke Nueno (young))
- Higurashi When They Cry (Suguru Okamura)
- Kujibiki Unbalance (2006 series) (Chihiro Enomoto)
- Inazuma Eleven (Rika Urabe, Fūsuke Suzuno/Gazel, Kimiyuki Nemuro/Nero)
- Lovely Complex (Seishirō "Seiko" Kotobuki)
- Mahoromatic (Suguru Misato)
- Mama Loves the Poyopoyo-Saurus (Yū Kunitachi)
- MegaMan NT Warrior (Kojirō Aragaki)
- Naruto (Young Asuma Sarutobi)
- Nintama Rantaro (Sakon Kawanishi)
- Noein (Yū Gotō)
- Pokémon (young Mewtwo)
- Raideen the Superior (Hayate Ohtori)
- This Ugly Yet Beautiful World (Ryo Ninomiya)
- Those Who Hunt Elves (Branko)
- Tsubasa: Reservoir Chronicle (Masayoshi Saitō)
- YAT Anshin! Uchū Ryokō (Edward)

=== Films ===
- Naruto Shippuden the Movie: The Lost Tower (2010) (Sarai, young Asuma)

=== Video games ===
- Flash Hiders (1993) (Erue)
- Magical Circle Guru Guru (1995) (Nike)
- Soul Edge (1995) (Taki)
- Ken-chan to Chie Asobi (1997)
- Klonoa: Door to Phantomile (1997) (Huepow)
- Grandia (1997) (Justin)
- Clock Tower: Ghost Head (1998) (Shou)
- Soulcalibur (1998) (Taki)
- The Legend of Zelda: Ocarina of Time (1998) (Young Link)
- The Legend of Zelda: Majora's Mask (2000) (Young Link)
- Power Stone 2 (2000) (Julia)
- Super Smash Bros. Melee (2001) (Young Link)
- Soulcalibur II (2002) (Taki)
- GioGio's Bizarre Adventure (2002) (Narancia Ghirga)
- Namco × Capcom (2005) (Taki, Tarosuke)
- Soulcalibur III (2005) (Taki)
- Kujibiki Unbalance: Kaichō Onegai Smash Fight (2007) (Chihiro Enomoto)
- Hyrule Warriors (2014) (Young Link)
- Super Smash Bros. Ultimate (2018) (Young Link)
- Inazuma Eleven: Victory Road (2025) (Kelvin Tetsuno)

Unknown date

- Ape Escape series (Kakeru)

=== Dubbing roles ===
==== Live action ====
- Annie: A Royal Adventure!, Michael Webb (George Wood)
- Double Jeopardy, Matty Parsons (Benjamin Weir)
- Funny Games, Georgie Farber (Devon Gearhart)
- School of Rock, Zack "Zack-Attack" Mooneyham (Joey Gaydos Jr.)
- Spy Kids (Netflix/Hulu edition), Juni Cortez (Daryl Sabara)
- The Time Machine (2002), Kalen (Omero Mumba)
- Tropic Thunder, Tran (Brandon Soo Hoo)
- Willy Wonka & the Chocolate Factory, Charlie Bucket (Peter Ostrum)

==== Animation ====
- King of the Hill, Bobby Hill (Pamela Adlon)
