= List of Kiss×sis chapters =

Chapters of Japanese manga

Cover of the first Kiss×sis tankōbon, which was released in Japan by Kodansha on December 11, 2005

The Kiss×sis manga, written and illustrated by Bow Ditama, is a seinen publication that premiered as a one-shot in the January 2004 issue of Bessatsu Young Magazine, a bimonthly periodical circulated by Kodansha. The story, a comedic slice of life, centers on Keita Suminoe, a fifteen-year-old middle-turn-high school student who is the frequent subject of his sixteen-year-old stepsisters' romantic attention.

Kiss×sis was then serialized in Kodansha's now-defunct bimonthly Bessatsu Young Magazine from December 19, 2005, to August 11, 2008. It was then transferred to Weekly Young Magazine, being serialized from September 29, 2008, to December 7, 2009. It was transferred to Monthly Young Magazine (rebranded title of Bessatsu Young Magazine) on December 9, 2009. It was on hiatus between the August 2013 and January 2014 issues. The manga finished after 17 years of publication on September 21, 2021. Kodansha collected its chapters in twenty-five tankōbon volumes, released under their KC Deluxe imprint, from September 6, 2007, to November 18, 2021. The manga is also licensed in Taiwan by Sharp Point Press.

It was announced in June 2008 that an animated adaption of Kiss×sis would be produced by Feel. On December 22 of that year, the first OVA was released, bundled with the third volume of the manga, directed by Munenori Nawa. Subsequent releases were packaged with subsequent volumes of the manga. The 12th and last episode was released on April 6, 2015 with the fourteenth volume of the manga.

In addition to its domestic release, the manga is also licensed for distribution in Taiwan by Sharp Point Press.

== Volume list ==
No.	Release date	ISBN
01	September 6, 2007	978-4-06-372344-1
1. "Let's Start From 0" (ゼロから始ぬよる, "Zero Kara Shi Nuyoru"); 2. "Under One Roof" (ひとつ屋根の下, "Hitotsu Yane no Shita"); 3. "Their Strategy" (ふたいのかけひき, "Futai no Kakehiki"); 4. "Is this What You'd Call a Love Triangle?" (これって三角食べ, "Korette Sankaku Tabe?"); 5. "Qualifications for Being Lovers" (恋人の資格, "Koibito no Shikakua"); 6. "The Guy Who Could Pass" (合格圏内の男, "Goukaku Kennai no Otoko"); 7. "The Good-for-Nothing Guy" (ロクでなしの男, "Rowa Denashi no Otoko")
Keita Suminoe, a fifteen-year-old third-year middle school student, endures the persistent and questionably incestuous affection of his sixteen-year-old stepsisters, Ako and Riko. When end of the year entrance exams begin to approach, Keita makes an effort to regularly attend prep school, leaving the girls for the most part uninvolved; on one such morning, they reminisce about their lives with him four years prior. Back at present time, the girls treat Keita to karaoke for the holidays, a visit that goes awry when an order of drinks are unexpectedly alcoholic.
02	January 1, 2008	978-4-06-375428-5
7. "Piss Off" (ごきげんナナメ, "Gokigen Naname"); 8. "Full of Memories" (ハチきれそうな想い, "Hachi Kiresouna Omoi"); 9. "Between Confusion and Frustration" (苦悩と煩悩の間で, "Kunō to Bonnō no Kan de"); 10. "The Reason to Feel Full of Confidence" (十分な気持ちと理由, "Jūbun na Kimochi to Riyū"); 11. "A Good Feeling Tool" (イイ感じのアイテム, "Ii Kanji no Aitemu"); 12. "One, Two, 3P!" (いち、にの、3P!, "Ichi, Nino, 3P!")
Back at home, the group spend New Year's together. In the days following, with exams a month away, Keita finds it increasingly difficult to study with the girls relentless advances; something he finds himself beginning to like and desire. In an effort to bring Keita luck on his upcoming exam, the girls, per an internet search at school, make an omamori of their pubic hair as a gift. Later, partially fueled by their libido, when cleaning Keita's room, the girls find an adult magazine, Ako and Riko put together a makeshift sex doll and masturbate on it.
03	December 22, 2008	978-4-06-375613-5
12. (Special) "Freedom, Go!" (自由に、ゴー！！, Jiyū ni, Go!!); 13. "Is There a Meaning to This?" (意味あんの？, "Imi Anno?"); 14. "The Day of the Test!" (いよいよ本番!, "Iyoiyo Honban!"); 15. "The Angst of a 15 Year Old Boy" (男15歳の苦悩, "Otoko 15 Toshi no Kunō"); 16. "The Lust of 16 Year Old Girls" (女16歳の煩悩, "Onna 16 Toshi no Bonnō"); 17. "An Unrestrained Night" (自由なナイトタイム!, "Jiyū na Naitotaimu")
Keita comes down with a flu and is bedridden for days as Ako and Riko endeavor to care for him. The morning of the exam arrives and Keita gives it his all; the following day, the group visit an onsen to celebrate. After playing some carnival games, eating lunch, visiting a sex museum, and having dinner, the trio relax in a bath. Ako attempts to take advantage of Keita by inebriating him on beer while Riko manages to seduce him when Ako passes out. In both instances, Keita falls asleep and awakens to remember nothing.
04	May 22, 2009	978-4-06-375723-1
18. "Isn't it Late for Your Ear?" (イヤに遅くない？, "Iya ni Osokunai?"); 19. "Oh, a Memento" (おトク記念品, "Otoku Kinenhin"); 20. "Within the Gym Storage Room" (二重露出, "Nijū Roshutsu"); 21. "A Surprise Present!" (不意打ちプレゼント, "Fuiuchichi Purezento!"); 22. "Carefree Entrance Ceremony" (ツツがない入学式, "Tsutsu Ganai Nyūgakushiki"); 23. "A Cruel Younger Brother" (残酷な弟, "Zankokuna Otōto")
The results of the exams arrive in the mail; Keita's however, go missing when a dog takes his and runs off. That evening, Miharu Mikuni, a fellow student, returns them; Keita has passed. During graduation, the group meet her again and a new acquaintance, Mikazuki Kiryū, an underclassman and friend of Keita's, who all participate in a lottery for his affection. The next day, Keita and the girls go to get him fitted for a new school uniform, meeting a tailor who doubles as his homeroom teacher, Yūzuki Kiryū. Witnessing the trio kiss at school, she makes it a personal goal to dissolve their relationship.
05	November 20, 2009	978-4-06-375829-0
24. "Dogs Are Going Crazy" (犬がニシ向きゃ, "Inu ga Nishi Mukya"); 25. "Let's Make Tea Turbid" (お茶は濁しましょう, "Ocha wa Nigoshi Mashō"); 26. "After a Midnight Bath" (風呂上りの夜空に, "Furo Nobori no Yozora ni"); 27. "An Unfamiliar Look" (不慣れなカッコ, "Funare na Kakko"); 28. "A Complicated Holiday Season" (フヤけた大型連休, "Fuya Keta Oogatarenkyū!"); 29. "Adorable Sisters" (ニクめない姉妹, "Niku Menai Shimai")
Yūzuki unsuccessfully convinces Miharu to date Keita and for Ako and Riko to stop with their amorous behavior. When a water fight in the women's bathroom leaves Yūzuki without clothes, Keita lends her his P.E. uniform; she brings it home, and in a flash of irony, masturbates to him in it. The next day, rummaging for a cookbook, Riko finds a pornographic magazine amid Ako's bookshelf, inspiring the girls to ask for a computer. The technician who sets it up for the family installs an internet filter however, prompting them to visit Akihabara to purchase an eroge instead. Making their way into the adult section of a video store, the girls bump into Yūzuki and Mikazuki; the two of whom, are revealed to be sisters.
06	June 4, 2010	978-4-06-375925-9
30. "An Unpredictable Relationship" (見通し不明な関係, "Mitooshi Fumei na Kankei"); 31. "Amazing Contact" (サイコーの密着度, "Saiko no Micchakudo"); 32. "Rewards Taste Like Honey" (ご褒美はミツの味, "Go Houbi ha Mitsu no Aji"); 33. "A Terrible Event" (様々なイベント, "Samazamana Ibento"); 34. "An Interview Without Hindrance" (サシつかえない訪問, "Sashi Tsukaenai Houmon"); 35. "A Magnificent Way to Hide" (見事な隠れかた, "Migoto na Kakure Kata")
Thinking back to all of the embarrassing experiences with Keita, and even having an orgasmic one thereafter, Miharu finds herself mildly attracted to him. After spending an intimate couple of days with Keita, Ako and Riko participate in a school physical, competing with one another for the best scores; despite having crash dieted for a day, Ako loses to the much anticipated weight measurement. On a rainy walk home from school, Mikazuki invites Keita over to her house where the two spend a prurient time together. Yūzuki returns home early, unfortunately, and in spite of a bold effort to hide from what becomes a compromising situation, Keita is found.
07	November 22, 2010	978-4-06-375998-3
36. "A Cold Home Visit" (おサムい家庭訪問, "Osamui Kateihoumon"); 37. "An Older Sister You Should Learn From" (見習うべき姉, "Minarau Kekiane"); 38. "After Being Refreshed..." (さっぱりした後は..., "Sapparishita Nochi ha..."); 39. "Explosive Emotion" (炸裂する愛情, "Sakuretsu Suru Aijō"); 40. "Being Blamed from Start to End..." (責められて..., "Seme Rarete.."); 41. "A Good Girl's Summer Holiday" (よい子の夏休み, "Yoiko no Natsuyasumi")
As a make-up for the previous incident with Mikazuki, Yūzuki arranges a home visit at the Suminoe's; with the rest of the family out for the day however, she spends a scandalous time with Keita instead. Following another passionate couple of days with Keita, Ako and Riko make plans for a summer vacation to either the beach or the mountains. Dissatisfied with the unsupervised arrangement, Yūzuki invites herself to chaperon with Miharu and Mikazuki in tote.
08	June 22, 2011	978-4-06-376073-6
42. "An Extremely Strange Seaside Story" (世にも奇妙な海物語, "Yonimo Kimyō na Umi Monogatari"); 43. "An Embarrassing Spot" (お恥ずかしいシミ, "Ohazukashi Ishimi"); 44. "A Beautiful Evening" (よよいの宵, "Yoyoino Shō"); 45. "The Teacher's Job" (教師のオシゴト, "Kyōshi no Oshigoto"); 46. "Bad Battle Tactics" (ヨロしくない状況, "Yoro Shikunai Joukyō"); 47. "What Happened in the Middle of the Night" (ヨナカの出来事, "Yonaka no Dekigoto"); 48. "Manipulating Your Younger Brother" (支配される弟, "Shihai Sareru Otōto")
The group decide on visiting the beach for vacation, which everyone spends an enjoyable time at for the day. After checking into a hotel, the gang sit to dinner, go out on a test of courage, and then return to bathe; much to Yūzuki's disappointment, Keita and the girls share a separate room for the night. Sneaking in to check on them, Yūzuki is drawn to Keita when he experiences an erection in his sleep and later when he sleepwalks in on her using the bathroom. Mikazuki, having seen and heard most of this, teases the truth out of her sister; Yūzuki likes Keita. That day, having won a game of rock-paper-scissors to Ako, Riko is given the opportunity to be alone with Keita.
09	November 30, 2011	978-4-06-376158-0
49. "Big Sis Failed" (しくじった姉, "Shikujitta Ane"); 50. "Since We're All Girls, No Need to Hold Back♪" (女子会なら､ご自由に♪, "Joshi Kai Nara go Jiyū ni♪"); 51. "Beyond Consent!?" (合意のうえで！？, "Goui Nouede!?"); 52. "Horny Ice" (ゴツゴツした氷, "Gotsugotsu Shita Kori"); 53. "Yūzuki Kiryū's Miscalculation" (桐生夕月の誤算, "Kiryū Yūduki no Gosan"); 54. "Go for it!" (same name)
As the second and final day of vacation hits noon, the group return to the beach. Keita, wishing to distance himself from Riko, takes Ako out on a boat in the ocean where the two share a lustful and embarrassing time under the sun. Jumping to midsummer, after spending a hot afternoon French kissing ice cubes with the girls, everyone save for Miharu attend an Obon festival; toward the end of the night, having made a move to kiss Keita, Yūzuki affirms she is in love with him. As summer vacation comes to an end, Keita, finishing up homework on his birthday, looks optimistically with Ako and Riko about their upcoming second semester at school.
10	July 6, 2012	978-4-06-376662-2
55. "It........It's a Misunderstanding!!!!!" (ご、誤解あります!!, "Go, Gokai Arimasu!!"); 56. "Don't Worry!!" (心配練無用!!, "Shinpai neri Muyō!!"); 57. "That Crushing Feeling" (ユナゴナになりそうな気持ち, "Yunagona ni nari-sōna Kimochi"); 58. "The Forbidden Secret Training" (御法は秘密練習, "Minori wa Himitsu Renshū"); 59. "The Best Performance" (極上の演技, "Gokujō no Engi"); 60. "Not as Naive as You'd Think!" (無糖の味は甘くはい！, "Mutō no aji wa Amaku wa i!")
After the vacation trip is over, the first day of the second semester has begun.Since the classmates of Keita envied him about the trip with his sisters during the vacation, Keita looked very depressed and thought about the incident with Yūzuki. Suddenly Miharu appeared and greeted him by her own which surprised Keita as well. Keita's friend Toda started to suspect him that Keita made love with Miharu in the vacation trip and imagined some perverted scenes which Keita denied at first until he admit that both of them went together on a trip.
11	February 6, 2013	978-4-06-376788-9
61. "Idle Time" (無為はる時間, "Mui Haru Jikan"); 62. "Intimate Relationship" (仲睦まじい剛系, "Naka mutsumajī Tsuyoshi-kei"); 63. "Hungry for Love" (愛情をムサボるように, "Aijō o Musaboru yō ni"); 64. "A Problem He Can't Ignore" (無視できない問題, "Mushi Dekinai Mondai"); 65. "Mikuni's Brutal Track and Field Day" (三国のムゴイ体育祭, "Sangoku no Mugoi Taiiku Matsuri"); 66. "Mumu! An Unknown Pleasure!!" (ムムッ！？未知な刺激！！, "Mumu~tsu!? Michina Shigeki!!"); 67. "A Nervous Time After School" (胸騒ぎの放課後, "Munasawagi no Hōkago")
Keita starts dating with Kiryuu Sensei.
12	November 6, 2013	978-4-06-376926-5
68. "Can't Leave Things Vague!!" (ウヤムヤにはできない！！, "Uyamuya ni wa Dekinai!"); 69. "Can't Stay Pure" (無垢ではなくてない, "Mukude Wanakute nai"); 70. "Growing" (なおさらに募る想い, "Naosara ni Tsunoru Omoi"); 71. "Secret Affection" (ナイショの好意, "Naisho no Kōi"); 72. "A Nostalgic Memory" (懐かしい記憶, "Natsukashī Kioku"); 73. "We Know Who Will Be Coming" (ナミナミと注意で, "Naminami to Chūi de"); 74. "Couple in a Stall" (個室での丌ハプジ, "Koshitsu de no Hapuji")
13	August 6, 2014	978-4-06-377037-7
75. "Birthday Games" (はごやはは家族ゲーム!!, "Wa Goya wa wa Kazoku Gēmu!!"); 76. "Hallelujah! Tapioca Night!!" (南無三！タピ丌カの夜!!, "Namusan! Tapi Ka no Yoru!!"); 77. "An Astounding Birthday Party" (ナナX上の誕生日祝い, "Nana X-jō no Tanjōbiiwai"); 78. "A Love of Many Ups and Downs" (七転び八起きの恋, "Nanakorobiyaoki no Koi"); 79. "Memories so Embarrassing They Make You Want to Cry" (泣くほど恥ずかしい記憶, "Naku hodo Hazukashī Kioku"); 80. "Mildly Cloudy with a Chance of Rain" (晴れ時々イケはい, "Hare Tokidoki Ike wa i")
14	April 6, 2015	978-4-06-358745-6
81. "High Tension in Taiwan" (ハイテンションin台湾, "Taiwan no Hai Tenshon"); 82. "Honey-Trap Teacher" (ハニトラ教師, "Hanitora Kyōshi'); 83. "Letting It Out at the Wrong Time" (発散しちゃおう時間差で, "Hassan sha ō Jikan-sa de"); 84. "Traces of Leftover Smells" (恥は嗅ぎ捨て, "Haji wa Kagi sute"); 85. "Early Celebration" (早くごちそうしてね, "Hayaku Gochisō shite ne"); 86. "Love Hotel, Here We Come...?" (ハローラブホテル。。。 。 ？, "Harō Rabu Hoteru. ... ?")
15	November 6, 2015	978-4-06-377347-7
87. "Rice Cakes over Flowers" (花よりお餅, "Hana Yori o Mochi"); 88. "KYAA!!?" (やややつ！！？, "Yaya Yatsu!!?"); 89. "The Really Stupid Couple" (迫真のバカップル, "Hakushin no Bakappuru"); 90. "The Distressed Lover" (活渋の恋人, "Katsu Shibu no Koibito"); 91. "Repent!" (悔い改めよ！, "Kuiaratameyo!"); 92. "It's Suddenly Bathing" (急にお風呂です, "Kyū ni o Furodesu")
16	April 6, 2016	978-4-06-377455-9
93. "Easily Managed" (与しやすい, "Kumishi Yasui"); 94. "Sneaking Suspicions" (くよくよコソコソ, "Kuyokuyo Kosokoso"); 95. "That Guy's Pervert" (こいつはヤバイ, "Koitsuhayabai"); 96. "Kick in school" (苦労性なのかも‥, "Kurōshōna no Kamo‥"); 97. "Quick Chocolate" (急なチョコ尽くし, Kyūna Choko Tsukushi"); 98. "Licking Chocolate Covered Boobs" (詳しくは言えないけど, "Kuwashiku wa Ienaikedo")
17	November 4, 2016	978-4-06-393070-2
99. "Sister to the Rescue!" (救急お姉さん, "Kyūkyū Onēsan"); 100. "Kisses on the 100th Chapter" (百物語でキス!!, "Hyakumonogatari de Kisu!!"); 101. "I'm Finally a First-Year" (1年生になりました, "1-Nensei ni Narimashita"); 102. "A Growing Concern" (膨らむ想い, "Fukuramu omoi"); 103. "Remembering" (さいげん, "Sai gen"); 104. "Trial" (試練, "Shiren")
18	May 2, 2017	978-4-06-393185-3
105. "Sorry, Mother" (ごめん母さん, "Gomen Kāsan"); 106. "Impossible" (ムリ, "Muri"); 107. "Missing" (なんにもない, "Nan'nimo Nai"); 108. "When in Hakodate" (函館にて, "Hakodate Nite"); 109. "This is How a Western Bathroom Is" (ここはユニットバス, "Koko wa Yunitto Basu"); 110. "Juicy" (ジューシー, "Jūshī")
Yūzuki decides to take a vacation to Hokkaido and Keita and the girls follow her.
19	December 6, 2017	978-4-06-510536-8
111. "To a Place Far Away" (遠い所へ, "Tōi Tokoro e"); 112. "A Great Day for My Departure" (いい日旅立ち, "Ī hi Tabidachi"); 113. "Meaningless" (意味なんて, "Imi Nante"); 114. "In A Single Night" (一夜一夜に, "Ichiyaichiya ni"); 115. "Chance of a Lifetime" (ー期ー会, "̄-Ki ̄-kai"); 116. "Rock You" (same name)
While in Hakodate, Keita meets Yūzuki in front of an Animate store, finding out she's an otaku. Yūzuki spends some time with him and wondered why Keita chose to go after her. He confesses his love to her, but Yūzuki interrogates him on how much. Afterwards, she breaks up with Keita. After heading home, Keita and the girls got smartphones and receive a link to an American pornsite from Yūzuki's e-mail. A few days later at school, Keita inadvertently told his class he dumped his girlfriend, realizing he goofed, because he convinced the class Miharu was his girlfriend, not Yūzuki. Miharu defended him and calmed the class down, only to remove Keita's desk, straddle him and kiss him deeply in front of the class...and a passing Ako and Riko.
20	July 6, 2018	978-4-06-512017-0
117. "Nightmare" (ナイトメア, "Naitomea"); 118. "The Other Side of Healing" (癒しの向こう側, "Iyashino Mukō-Gawa"); 119. "Sleepless Nights" (いく夜眠れぬ, "Iku Yoru Nemurenu"); 120. "A Beastly Personality" (ニ獣人格, "Ni-jū Jinkaku"); 121. "Finally Caught Him" (ついに捕まった？, "Tsuini Tsukamatta?"); 122. "I Can't Turn Back to Normal" (普通じゃ戻れない, "Futsū ja Modorenai")
Miharu finally felt the rush of kissing Keita and desires to be with him completely. All her worrying and secret love for Keita soon begin to manifest into a different personality that Keita calls "Lewd Mikuni", where Miharu is no longer the shy and quiet glasses-girl he loves, but a nymphomaniac willing to do anything she puts her mind to, scaring Keita.
21	March 6, 2019	978-4-06-514797-9
123. "Accumulating Feelings" (積み重なる想い, "Tsumikasanaru Omoi"); 124. "Mysterious Playing" (不思議遊戯, "Fushigi Yūgi"); 125. "Surprise Attack" (不意討ち, "Fuiuchi"); 126. "Spinning Bonds" (紡ぎ直す絆, "Tsumugi Naosu Kizuna"); 127. "Before Everything Connects" (つながる前に, "Tsunagaru Mae ni"); 128. "Grinning Face" (ニヤケ顔, "Niyake Gao")
Keita's plan to "change" Miharu back to normal was use a variation of Pavlov's reaction techniques by kissing her hard until she returns to normal. Yūzuki suddenly saw Keita and went to talk to him. Keita, feeling scared, had Miharu hide under the teacher's desk. As Keita was talking to Yūzuki, Miharu felt ignored and her "Lewd" self emerged, giving Keita fellatio under the desk, surprising Yūzuki. When Keita told Ako and Riko what Miharu had done, Ako decided to test her theory out by going home with Keita. That prompted Miharu ready to fight, but Ako stepped toward Miharu and kissed her in a way that calmed Miharu down. After Keita, Ako and Miharu kissed together, Ako told Miharu not to go "all lewd", and reprimanded Keita for ignoring Miharu, telling him to treat her better.
22	March 6, 2020	978-4-06-518812-5
129. "Revolting" (にくたらしい, "Nikutarashii"); 130. "A Charming Shadow" (見とれる背中, "Mitoreru Senaka"); 131. "Blooming Talent" (才能開花, Sainō Kaika); 132. "I Came to See You" (見に来たよ♡, "Mi ni Ki ta yo"); 133. "All Ears" (目あり, "Me ari"); 134. "Unrecognizable Appearance" (見知らぬ姿, "Mishiranu Sugata"); 135. "The Best Time to See" (見頃です, "Migorodesu")
Riko called Miharu to meet up with Yuuzuki at her apartment in the hopes of winning Keita from Ako, after the way she resolved her and Miharu, so Yuuzuki suggests Riko to cosplay for Keita. Riko got sick after a strenuous workout, so Keita decided to lick her sweat to keep her cool, but freaking her out. Then, Keita got Riko's cold. Ako gave Miharu her spare key to visit Keita as she doesn't trust Riko, so Miharu excused herself early and visited Keita and straddled him licking him clean like he did to Riko. Then, she began to urinate, causing Keita to think fast and place his trash bin under Miharu. After Keita felt better, Miharu got sick. Riko began to tell the details of her date with Keita to a karaoke bar dressed in girlish clothes hoping to appeal to Keita, only for him to notice why Riko's acting strange. Then, Mikazuki came in and had plenty of outfits for Riko to try on. After the date, Riko felt slightly more confident in her rivalry with Ako. Mikazuki came by to visit Keita cosplaying as Yuuzuki, hoping he'd fall in love with her, but to no avail. Nevertheless, they had fun with Mikazuki's cosplay, but when a kindergartener outfit was mixed up in the cosplay outfits, Keita suggested that Mikazuki wear it. She obliged and sat on his lap as Keita patted her head as she relaxed almost as if she would fall asleep. After the visit, Mikazuki scolded Yuuzuki for including the kindergartener's outfit.
23	December 4, 2020	978-4-06-521705-4
136. "Hot & Bothered" (いざムラムラ, "Izamuramura"); 137. "Don't Tell Everyone" (皆もで言わないで, "Mina mo de Iwanaide"); 138. "Miharu" (美春, "Miharu"); 139. "Thank You for Everything" (いっぱいサンキュー, "Ippai Sankyū"); 140. "Overnight" (一夜を越えて, "Ichiya o Koete"); 141. "Night by Night" (一夜一夜に, "Ichiya Ichiya ni"); 142. "Bathing Together" (一緒に風呂で, "Issho ni Furo de")
After hearing from Yuuzuki about Mikazuki's visit to Keita, Miharu decided to visit him and have him do the exact thing he did to Mikazuki. However, Keita found it difficult to do with Miharu's voluptuous figure complicating things. Then, "Lewd Miharu" came out and lap-danced Keita, causing him to panic. As he stood up, he saw Miharu twerking on him. Keita decided to dry hump Miharu back to normal, and when she changed back, she felt sorry for her lewdness, but Keita then told Miharu he never wanted to see her again. The news devastated Miharu as she was upset that her lewd side ruined things between her and Keita. After calming down, she decided to confess her true feelings for Keita tomorrow at school. As she and Keita met, Ako, Riko, Yuuzuki and Mikazuki were secretly observing the conversation. Miharu confessed as her normal self to Keita that she loved him when they first met. However, after everything he experienced, he rejects her. Miharu expected Keita to reject her and didn't mind, but had a sneaky suspicion about Keita, and flat out deduced he still loved Ako and Riko. Keita violently denies the claim and told Miharu she was being ridiculous, until Ako and everyone else came out to confront Keita, shocking and stupefying him. Ako and Riko were furious at Keita for dumping Miharu like a cold-hearted bastard. The twins offered their condolences to Miharu and their congratulations to confessing her true love. Mikazuki noticed that the twins always bullied any girl that came near Keita, including her and Miharu, and now they confirm Miharu as the "perfect girlfriend" for Keita. After Keita got left in the dust by the girls, he had trouble functioning and has developed erectile dysfunction. Nothing he had tried worked. Desperate, he called Miharu for assistance. She brought him to the shower, had him seated down and showered him both with the shower wand and urinating on him until Keita became erect again, much to the disgust of Ako, Riko and Mikazuki who watched behind the stall. Keita, Ako and Riko were preparing for their final year in high school. Keita is pushing it on the track, Ako is cramming for college and Riko is working overtime at the restaurant. After an exhausting day for everyone, they decide to take a bath, but Keita had the idea of bathing in total darkness to add to the mystery and fear factor. However, it backfired on him as Ako and Riko took full advantage, freaking Keita out. The next day, Keita was returning home thinking about the other night and as his mind wandered, so did himself and got lost.
24	June 17, 2021	978-4-06-523672-7
143. "Ingrained Feelings" (シミついた想い, "Shimi tsuita Omoi"); 144. "The One With a Weak Will" (意志弱いのは, "Ishi Yowai no wa"); 145. "Self-Control Through Lack of Thought" (思考停止の自制心, "Shikō Teishi no Jiseishin"); 146. "Let's Put it on White & Black" (シロクロつけよう！, "Shiro Kuro Tsuke yō!"); 147. "Life of No Commitments" (意志無き日常, "Ishi naki Nichijō"); 148. "Who to Blame for the Weak Will?" (意志薄弱は誰のせい？, "Ishi Hakujaku wa Dare no Sei?")
25	November 18, 2021	978-4-06-525882-8
149. "More Conscious" (意識しちゃうぞ, "Ishiki Shichauzo"); 150. "Pool of Resentment" (遺恨プール, "Ikon Pūru"); 151. "Sanctuary" (憩いの場所, "Ikoi no Basho"); 152. "An Unreadable Heart" (一向に読めないココロ, "Ikkō ni Yomenai Kokoro"); 153. "Submit to the Sisters" (姉に降参, "Ane ni Kōsan"); 154. "Last Kiss" (最後のキスは, "Saigo no Kisu wa")
