= Atsushi Kisaichi =

Japanese voice actor

- 私市 淳
- Born: February 23, 1972 (age 54); Minato, Tokyo, Japan
- Occupations: Voice actor, narrator
- Years active: 1992–present
- Agent: Aoni Production
- Notable work: DRAMAtical Murder as Aoba Seragaki; Kirby as Meta Knight
- Height: 168 cm (5 ft 6 in)

Atsushi Kisaichi (私市 淳, Kisaichi Atsushi; born February 23, 1972) is a Japanese voice actor and narrator currently affiliated with Aoni Production.

== Filmography ==
=== Anime ===
1992

- Crayon Shin-chan as Yuji

1994

- Aoki Densetsu Shoot! as Tooru Endo
- Slam Dunk as Miura
- Dragon Ball Z as Citizen (ep 243), Reporter (ep 231)
- Sailor Moon S as Boy B (ep 105), Chin-Chin Tei (ep 107)
- Marmalade Boy as Alex

1995

- Sailor Moon SuperS as Editor 2 (ep 134)

1996

- Jigoku Sensei Nube as Kimu Takera "Kimutake", Narumi
- Dragon Ball GT as Oob, Ax (ep 25), Man in Store B (ep 3)
- Sailor Moon Sailor Stars as Host (ep 191), Newscaster (ep 169), Resident (ep 183)
- Brave Command Dagwon as Ryuu Hashiba

1998

- His and Her Circumstances as Hideaki Asaba
- Kocchi Muite Miko as Kenta
- Nazca as Kendo Judge
- All Purpose Cultural Cat Girl Nuku Nuku as Rintarou Shimazaki
- Yu-Gi-Oh! as Hirata (ep 17), Male Student (ep 10)

1999

- Pokémon as Isao (ep 87)

2000

- NieA_7 as George
- Mushrambo as Volt

2001

- Offside as Hideki Yakumaru
- Kirby: Right Back at Ya! as Meta Knight, Turbo (ep 90), Chief Borun, Boney (ep 89)
- Mahoromatic - Automatic Maiden as Kiyomi Kawahara, Punk A (ep 9)
- Project ARMS: The 2nd Chapter as Keith Green

2002

- Kanon as Yuichi Aizawa
- Princess Tutu as Pualo (ep 6)
- Mahoromatic: Something More Beautiful as Kiyomi Kawahara

2003

- Tenshi na Konamaiki as Aota
- Planetes as Corin
- Bobobo-bo Bo-bobo as Kazutaka (ep 3), Mysterious Person (ep 16)
- Mermaid Melody: Pichi Pichi Pitch as Yuya Ishibashi (ep 10)

2004

- This Ugly Yet Beautiful World as Shinichi Asakura
- Detective Conan as Yasuo Fujino (ep 368)

2005

- Gakuen Alice as Shuichi Sakurano
- Sukisho as Gaku Ichikawa

2006

- Guardian Ninja Mamoru as Mamoru Kagemori
- Code Geass: Lelouch of the Rebellion as Nagata (ep 1), Shougo Asahina, Terrorist (ep 2)
- The Story of Saiunkoku as Hakumei Heki

2007

- Big Windup! as Yoshirou Hamada
- Gintama as Kyoushirou (ep 55)
- Gegege no Kitarō as Ganbari-Nyuudou
- Koi Suru Tenshi Angelique: Kagayaki no Ashita as Timka
- D.Gray-man as Robert (eps 29-30)
- Detective Conan as Man (ep 474)
- Megaman Star Force as Gemini
- One Piece as Debt Collector (ep 318)

2008

- Gegege no Kitarō as Hidemaru
- Code Geass: Lelouch of the Rebellion R2 as Luciano Bradley, Shougo Asahina

2009

- Mahoromatic: I'm Home! as Kiyomi Kawahara

2011

- Gintama' as Kyoushirou
- Ring ni Kakero 1: Sekai Taikai-hen as Icarus (ep 5)

2012

- The Knight in the Area as Koichi Hibino

2013

- Saint Seiya Omega as Cyllène

2014

- The World Is Still Beautiful as Ocean Kingdom's Ambassador (ep 3)
- Tonari no Seki-kun as Math Teacher (eps 11-12)
- DRAMAtical Murder as Aoba Seragaki

=== Movies ===
- Dragon Ball Z: Fusion Reborn (1995) as Man (B)
- Gundam Seed: Special Edition (xxxx) as Rusty Mackenzie

=== OVA ===
- Future GPX Cyber Formula SIN (xxxx) as Phill Fritz
- Saint Seiya: The Hades Chapter — Sanctuary (xxxx) as Papillon Myu

=== Video games ===
- Super Smash Bros. Brawl (2008) as Meta Knight
- Yggdra Union: We'll Never Fight Alone (2008) as Durant
- Super Smash Bros. for Nintendo 3DS and Wii U (2014) as Meta Knight
- Super Smash Bros. Ultimate (2018) as Meta Knight
- Kirby series as Meta Knight
- Dragon Shadow Spell as Kiriyama Laika
- Mega Man Powered Up as Oilman
- Gitaroo Man as Gregorio Siegfried Wilheim III
- DRAMAtical Murder (2012) as Aoba Seragaki
- DRAMAtical Murder Re:connect (2013) as Aoba Seragaki
- DRAMAtical Murder Re:code (2014) as Aoba Seragaki
- Dynasty Warriors 7 Empires (2011) as Xu Shu
- Dynasty Warriors 8 (2014) as Xu Shu
- Dynasty Warriors 9 Empires (2021) as Xu Shu
- Monster Retsuden Oreca Battle as Ales
- Tokimeki Memorial Girl's Side 3rd Story (2010) as Niina Junpei
- Unlight, as Blaze
- Soshite Bokura Wa, as Gray

=== Drama CDs ===
- Akanai Tobira as Tayama
- GetBackers drama CDs Sariel
- Hana-Kimi drama CDs as Izumi Sano
- Hoigakusha to Keiji no Aisho series 2: Hoigakusha to Keiji no Honne as Yuuji Ishida
- Mainichi Seiten! series 1
- Mainichi Seiten! series 2: Kodomo wa Tomaranai
- Oishii Karada as Daiki Nosaka
- Tsuki no Sabaku Satsujin Jiken as Akira Hayashi
- Warui Koto Shitai as Nagahisa Aikawa
- Yebisu Celebrities Grand Finale as Akira Sasao
- DRAMAtical Murder as Aoba Seragaki

=== Dubbing ===
- Batman: Brave and the Bold as Roy Harper / Speedy
- Teen Titans as Speedy
- Young Justice as Speedy/Red Arrow/Roy Harper
