= Shina Dark =

Japanese manga series

- Front cover of first manga volume

シャイナ・ダルク 〜黒き月の王と蒼碧の月の姫君〜 (Shina Dark ~Kuroki Tsuki no Ō to Sōheki no Himegimi~)
- Genre: Comedy, fantasy
- Manga
- Written by: Bunjūrō Nakayama
- Illustrated by: Yukari Higa
- Published by: ASCII Media Works
- Magazine: Dengeki Teioh; (January 2006–November 2006); Dengeki Daioh; (April 2007–March 2009)
- Original run: January 26, 2006 – March 2009
- Volumes: 4

Shina Dark: Kuroki Tsuki no Ō to Sōheki no Himegimi (シャイナ・ダルク 〜黒き月の王と蒼碧の月の姫君〜, Shaina Daruku; lit. Shina Dark ~King of Dark Moon and Blue Moon's Princess~) is a Japanese fantasy and comedy manga series written by Bunjūrō Nakayama and drawn by Yukari Higa. The manga originally started serialized in ASCII Media Works' seinen manga magazine Dengeki Teioh on January 26, 2006, and ran in that magazine until November 2006 when it went on hiatus until starting up again in ASCII Media Works' shōnen manga magazine Dengeki Daioh in April 2007. The manga ended serialization in Dengeki Daioh in the March 2009 issue. Four bound volumes were released by ASCII Media Works. A DVD containing four animated music video clips was bundled with the third manga volume, produced by the animation studio Shaft.

== Plot ==
The series revolves around the legendary demon lord Exoda C. Claw who is revived when an eclipse forms the Exoda Ring and the demonic island Shina Dark rises once again. Kingdoms and villages from around the world send over a thousand sacrificial maidens to the island in an attempt to satisfy the demon lord's legendary lust and protect their lands from the unspeakable destruction he will bring. However, the legends are false; Exoda does not possess such lust, and is not interested in destroying the world. He's quite happy to live in peace and to go fishing on the weekends. The girls on the island are now unable to return to their homelands, as others see them as tainted brides of Satan. This presents many practical problems, from simply feeding the abandoned girls to giving their lives purpose. To this end, the demon lord enlists the help of two exiled princesses, Galett from the East Vansable Empire, and Christina from the Kingdom of Estgloria. The two princesses become the Green and Blue Moon Princesses, respectively, symbolic leaders of the new independent nation of Shina Dark, a nation created to give the abandoned girls a new life in a new country.

== Characters ==
Exoda Cero Claw (エクソダ・セロ・クラウ, Ekusoda Sero Kurau)
Voiced by: Daisuke Ono
Exoda is the Demon Lord of Shina Dark, also called Satan. Legend says that he is a cruel and vicious beast that when revived, will take a thousand wives, and he will sleep with ten at a time and continuously attack towns and cities to take their women. These legends have been written while Exoda has been asleep and are completely false as in fact he has a laid back and calm personality, despite being very powerful. After waking up and finding that his island is populated with hundreds of women exiled from their homelands as offerings to him, he decides to declare Shina Dark as an independent nation and declare Galett and Christina as its symbolic leaders, who are thus nicknamed the "Twin Moon Princesses".
Galett Fey Sowauge (ガレット・フェイ・ソワージュ, Garetto Fei Sowāju)
Voiced by: Haruka Tomatsu
Galett is the fourth princess of the wealthy and advanced Vansable Empire, sent to Shina Dark to become Exoda's concubine in order to protect the peace of her home empire. Exoda grants her the title of Green Moon Princess of Shina Dark, one of the Twin Moon Princesses who are symbolic leaders of the nation of Shina Dark. She is a strong sword fighter and has been instrumental in the creation of a militia to protect the townspeople on the island. She was raised to be a knight and follow the codes of chivalry by an adviser of her father's, who she calls Grandfather. She has somewhat of a hard time governing Shina Dark during the time when Christina is recovering. With recent occurrences on the island, she starts to hold affectionate feelings towards Exoda (Satan). She regards Christina as a friend as well as a rival towards love.
Christina Rey Holden (クリスティナ・レイ・ホールデン, Kurisutina Rei Hōruden)
Voiced by: Kaori Nazuka
Christina is the thirteenth princess of the dwindling Estgloria Kingdom. The ruling Queen of Estgloria has sent Christina to Shina Dark out of hate for Christina's mother. Christina receives the title of Blue Moon Princess, the second of the Twin Moon Princesses. While not strong or possessing any real power which makes her feels useless, Christina later learns she is a skilled strategist, boosting her resolve. Christina also suffers health problems after being slowly poisoned over many years under the orders of the Queen. Touched by Exoda's (Satan) kind and caring words, she also develops affection towards him. She regards Galett as a friend as well as a rival towards love.
Marple Mashu Marces
Voiced by: Kana Hanazawa
A little girl originally sent to Shina Dark to be a sacrifice, Exoda instead adopts her as a daughter.
Noel D. Buche
Voiced by: Ayako Kawasumi
A robot girl who serves as Exoda's maid. She is later shown to have a battle mode, of which Exodus comments on, saying she serves as a mid level boss in this mode.
Rune Butler Vincent
Voiced by: Hiroki Yasumoto
Master of the Undead and Exoda's butler. He is often mistaken as Exoda himself.

== Nations ==
Shina Dark
An island nation formerly ruled by Exoda, the Demon Lord of Shina Dark before giving the leadership to the Twin Moon Princesses, Christina and Galett. The Shina Dark government is a Constitutional Monarchy with the Princesses as the heads of the government and an elected parliament supporting them, and Exoda as head of state, or monarch. Originally populated by the one thousand women sent as sacrifices, it later grew to include refugees who were invited or came to Shina Dark in search for a better life.
Zirus Ziriola
One of two nations that lies between the Western and Eastern Continent, the other being the Magical Kingdom of Shumarika. Due to its strategic position, it is a nation heavily focused on trade. Zirus is one of the few known nations to openly trade with Shina Dark.
Kingdom of Estgloria
A mighty kingdom in the Western Continent, Estgloria is now a shadow of its former self after the death of its King. Ruled by the Corrupt Regent, Queen Catherine S. Langton and her son, the Crown Prince Crispin, they ruled the kingdom without care, heavily taxing their citizens in order to fund theirs and the Nobles lavish lifestyle and hedonistic ways.
Vansable Empire
Formerly a small kingdom, Vansable miraculously defeated a larger army that invaded them which later led to a series of wars that turn the kingdom into a mighty empire that ruled the Eastern Continent. Ruled by Emperor Galeon Fey Sowauge and Prime Minister Ernst D. Volkoren, the Vansable Empire is the richest and has the most technological advanced armies in the world.

== Media ==
=== Manga ===
The manga series is being drawn by Yukari Higa and written by Bunjūrō Nakayama. The series originally began serialization in the magazine Dengeki Teioh, published by ASCII Media Works, on January 26, 2006, but due to discontinuation of Dengeki Teioh on November 26, 2006, the series was moved to Dengeki Daioh on April 21, 2007. The manga ended serialization in the March 2009 issue of Dengeki Daioh. Four bound volumes were published by ASCII Media Works under their Dengeki Comics imprint. The series is licensed in France by Taifu Comics.

=== Music videos ===
A DVD containing four animated music videos supervised by Akiyuki Shinbo, directed by Shinpei Tomooka, Naoyuki Konno, Shin Oonuma, and Toshimasa Suzuki, and animated by Shaft, was released with the limited edition of manga volume three on March 21, 2008. A digest of the videos was released in the February 2008 issue of Dengeki Daioh that was released on December 21, 2007. This digest was also posted on the Dengeki Comics official Shina Dark website.
