= Mahoromatic =

Japanese manga and anime series

- Cover of the first manga volume of Mahoromatic

まほろまてぃっく (Mahoromatikku)
- Genre: Action, Romance, Science fiction, Comedy
- Manga
- Written by: Bunjūrō Nakayama
- Illustrated by: Bow Ditama
- Published by: Wani Books
- English publisher: AUS: Madman Entertainment; NA: Tokyopop
- Magazine: Comic Gum
- Original run: December 1998 – July 26, 2004
- Volumes: 8
- Anime television series

Mahoromatic: Automatic Maiden
- Directed by: Hiroyuki Yamaga
- Produced by: Hiroki Satou (Gainax); Mitsutoshi Kubota (Shaft); Tetsuo Genshou (TBS); Yuuichi Sekido (Pioneer LDC)
- Written by: Hiroyuki Yamaga; Shouji Saeki
- Music by: Toshio Masuda
- Studio: Gainax; Shaft
- Licensed by: AUS: Madman Entertainment; NA: Pioneer Entertainment (former) Sentai Filmworks; UK: ADV Films (defunct)
- Original network: BS-i
- Original run: October 6, 2001 – December 29, 2001
- Episodes: 12
- Anime television series

Mahoromatic: Something More Beautiful
- Directed by: Hiroyuki Yamaga Shouji Saeki (Note: Assistant Director (副監督). See the Shaft director credits legend.)
- Produced by: Hiroki Satou (Gainax); Mitsutoshi Kubota (Shaft); Tetsuo Genshou (TBS); Yuuichi Sekido (Pioneer LDC)
- Written by: Hiroyuki Yamaga; Jukki Hanada
- Music by: Toshio Masuda
- Studio: Gainax; Shaft
- Licensed by: AUS: Madman Entertainment; NA: Pioneer Entertainment (former) Sentai Filmworks; UK: MVM Films
- Original network: BS-i
- Original run: September 27, 2002 – January 17, 2003
- Episodes: 14
- Anime television film

Mahoromatic: Summer Special
- Directed by: Shouji Saeki
- Written by: Bunjuro Nakayama
- Music by: Toshio Masuda
- Studio: Gainax; Shaft
- Licensed by: AUS: Madman Entertainment; NA: Geneon Entertainment (former) Sentai Filmworks; UK: MVM Films
- Original network: BS-i
- Released: August 15, 2003
- Runtime: 23 minutes
- Anime television series

Mahoromatic: I'm Home
- Directed by: Shouji Saeki
- Written by: Tatsuhiko Urahata
- Music by: Toshio Masuda
- Studio: Gainax
- Licensed by: AUS: Madman Entertainment; NA: Sentai Filmworks
- Original run: October 17, 2009 – October 24, 2009
- Episodes: 2

Mahoromatic (Japanese: まほろまてぃっく, Hepburn: Mahoromatikku) is a Japanese manga series written by Bunjūrō Nakayama and illustrated by Bow Ditama. The series follows Mahoro, a female android former soldier who, driven by guilt from her actions during her combat days, decides to dedicate the rest of her life to serving the son of her late commander as a maid. Originally serialized by Wani Books in Comic Gum magazine between 1998 and 2004, it was also compiled into eight tankōbon volumes.

An anime adaptation of Mahoromatic produced by studios Gainax and Shaft aired in Japan from October to December 2001, and was followed by a second season airing from September 2002 to January 2003.

== Characters ==
=== Misato residence ===
Mahoro Andou (安藤 まほろ, Andō Mahoro) (CODE: V1046-R MAHORO)

- Voiced by: Ayako Kawasumi (Japanese); Bridget Hoffman (English)

Mahoro is an android created by VESPER to fight an alien invasion by Saint during the 1980s. She is fast and immensely powerful, and is considered to be a formidable opponent by her enemies.

Being an android, she has a limited life span. At the beginning of the story, she has just 398 days to live and VESPER gives her the freedom to do anything she wants. She chooses to become a maid for Suguru Misato: his father was her superior officer who was also killed (as collateral damage) when she killed an alien who had taken him hostage.

Mahoro has a very sunny disposition and is friendly to just about everyone—she becomes a welcome regular at the market and becomes famous at Suguru's school when it is made known that she is working for him. She also quickly becomes an excellent cook, able to emulate and recreate dishes from the best restaurants. She is also quite devoted to Suguru, with feelings for him reminiscent of both a doting mother and a shy girlfriend.

However, she is very hostile towards anything perverted. A good portion of the story's humour comes from Mahoro chasing after Suguru's secret stash of pornographic magazines which, given her training, she is easily able to find. She is well known for this attitude from her catch phrase: "Ecchi na no wa ikenai to omoimasu" ("I think that dirty thoughts are bad"). Mahoro and Shikijo-sensei's dislike of one another stems from the fact that Shikijo is constantly trying to engage in an illicit relationship with Suguru. As such, Mahoro is very protective of Suguru when it comes to Shikijo's advances towards him.

Mahoro is very concerned about appearances, refusing to wear normal clothes given her position as a maid. She is also obsessed with her small breasts, and some stories actually deal with her rivalry with Shikijo (who has very large breasts), as well as her techniques and requests to VESPER for larger breasts.

Mahoro retains access to many of her weapons and gadgets from her VESPER days, and is able to pull out her gun at any time. She also has access to the "silpheed", a backpack-like device which when worn on her back, allows her to fly, as well as her support mech, Slash. She is able to call both the Silpheed and Slash at a moment's notice from the badge she wears on her maid uniform. In addition, she also owns a fully equipped red 2001 BMW Z3 convertible and MV Agusta motorcycle.

Mahoro was created using Saint alien technology, so she has a true soul and a pure heart. Later in the series it is revealed that Mahoro is directly connected to the memories of Matthew, who occasionally advises her.

She had no surname until the name Andou (short for android) was created by Suguru.

Despite being an android, Mahoro (in addition to having feelings and emotions) is also able to eat, sleep, go to the bathroom, and feel pain.

Suguru Misato (美里 優, Misato Suguru)

- Voiced by: Fujiko Takimoto, Nobutoshi Canna (adult) (Japanese); Derek Stephen Prince, Wendee Lee (child, Something More Beautiful), Mona Marshall (child, I'm Home) Tony Oliver (adult) (English)

Suguru Misato is a junior high school student living in Tokyo. He lost both his parents earlier—his mother (who was half Saint), and years later, his father. While he believed his father was killed in an accident during a business trip, he was actually a commander (and Mahoro's commanding officer) in VESPER and was killed in action during the alien war. Although relatives offered to take him in, he refused and lived alone prior to Mahoro's arrival.

He is smart and has an IQ of 130. He makes a favorable impression on members of the opposite sex. Suguru had a whole stash of dirty magazines which were all thrown away when Mahoro first arrived. Although he continues to try to smuggle them in and hide them, Mahoro will often find them—leading to comical confrontations between the two. Suguru uses a whole range of creative tactics to conceal his magazines, and is capable of running away very fast when being chased.

Suguru hired a maid because of the filthy state of his house. He was expecting an older woman, and Mahoro's arrival completely surprised him. At the end of the series Mahoro and Suguru have fallen in love.

Minawa Andou (安藤 みなわ, Andō Minawa) (CODE: 370)

- Voiced by: Ai Shimizu (Japanese); Lara Jill Miller (Something More Beautiful), Christine Marie Cabanos (I'm Home) (English)

Minawa is first introduced in Mahoromatic ~Something More Beautiful~. Clumsy and anemic, she ends up living with Mahoro and Suguru and going to school under the pretext of being Mahoro's younger sister. She has a habit of apologizing for everything she does, even when she does nothing wrong. She claims to be a runaway member of The Management, but is later revealed to have been sent to gather information on VESPER's battle android Mahoro after being promised a heart in return. However, Mahoro convinces her that the fact that she can cry means she already has a heart. Suguru's friend Hamaguchi develops a crush on her, and, despite her shortcomings, it is later insinuated that they form a relationship. It was later revealed that Minawa is not an android but a cyborg, and her body is in horrible shape due to all the experiments performed on her. Near the end of the series, she leaves earth so she can get treatment at Saint's home world. At the end of the anime, it is suggested she was completely healed and is with Hamaguchi.

Like Mahoro, Minawa had no surname until one was created by Suguru, and it better enabled her pretend to be Mahoro's little sister.

Slash (スラッシュ, Surasshu) (CODE: V1046 R9-SLASH ZERO)

- Voiced by: Keiichi Noda (Japanese); Lex Lang (English)

Slash is known as a "support mech" and assists Mahoro during combat. He has the form of a panther and can be summoned at any time by Mahoro. Although he can speak, his mouth never moves except during times when he expresses emotions. Although used for combat in the past, he often now acts as a guard dog around the Misato residence and a friend to the Misato's dog—a role he was not thrilled to take in the beginning.

He is friendly but tough and will lend a helping paw when asked. Although Mahoro is Slash's master, he will now take commands from Suguru: since Suguru is Mahoro's employer, he is also her master and thus Slash's master as well.

Near the end of the anime series, he was used to wipe out Management and was last seen standing at the side of the fallen Vesper leader.

However, (in the manga) he firmly stands by Mahoro's side, as she uses her final powers to destroy the asteroid to save mankind.

=== Junior high school ===
Saori Shikijo (式条 沙織, Shikijō Saori)

- Voiced by: Yumi Takada (Japanese); Wendee Lee (English)

Saori Shikijo, or Shikijo-sensei, is Suguru's perverted Junior High School teacher who finds herself very attracted to him. She has an extreme shota complex, an attraction to young boys. Many jokes stem from her attempts to openly physically seduce Suguru, coupled with the myriad ways in which her attempts are foiled by Mahoro.

She is a beautiful and surprisingly strong woman, something Saori is very proud and boastful of, who also happens to be a heavy drinker, and as a result is often broke and unable to afford food. Soon after Mahoro arrives at the Misato household, Shikijo starts inviting herself for dinner on a daily basis despite Mahoro's protests.

Shikijo and Mahoro often compete with each other, often with Suguru as the prize, usually with Mahoro emerging victorious except when it comes to insults. She has much larger breasts than Mahoro, or any other character in the series, which she flaunts when comparing herself to Mahoro or in taunting her. Her large breasts are also a focus of her many attempts to seduce Suguru.

In the manga, it is shown, after the time lapse, that she has yet to age, most likely due to her mentioned strict beauty regimen, and has also become the principal of the junior high school, which has done nothing to dampen her love for young boys.

Miyuki Sakura (佐倉 深雪, Sakura Miyuki)

- Voiced by: Yumi Kikuchi (Japanese); Michelle Ruff (English)

The blue haired member of the "Triomatic," Miyuki, whose family owns the local bath house, is very tomboyish by contrast with the other two, but is just as loyal. She and her family have known Suguru since childhood and is his best friend; her father thinks of him as the son he never had. She doesn't admit it openly, but she is in love with Suguru, mentioning that her first kiss with Suguru was on the forehead after he had come to her rescue from a group of bullies; a conflict which she had started.

In the manga, after the time lapse, Miyuki is shown to have inherited, and still manage, the bath house, alongside her family. She is also shown to be married to Suguru's friend and former classmate, Kiyomi Kawahara, with whom she had a child. Despite being separated for so long, Miyuki still cares very deeply for Suguru, and is dismayed that he has yet to be happy or live his own life after Mahoro ceased to function.

Rin Todoriki (等々力 凛, Tōdōriki Rin)

- Voiced by: Manabi Mizuno (Japanese); Dorothy Elias-Fahn (English)

Rin is the brown-haired and tallest member of the "Triomatic." She is the most ladylike of the three, but is also a skilled martial artist and very loyal. Like Miyuki, she is in love with Suguru, mentioning that her first kiss with Suguru was on the cheek during a summer class project involving insects.

Rin has also the most physically developed breasts of the Triomatic, which at times causes Miyuki and Chizuko consternation. For the most part Rin seems almost embarrassed when the other two complain about her breasts, but as the series goes on she becomes more and more comfortable with her "advantage", similar to their teacher, Shikijo-sensei.

Rin's family is wealthy (coming from a long military line), and lives in a palatial estate filled with numerous pieces of art.

In the manga, after the time lapse, it is shown that Rin has now become a teacher at the same junior high school she and her friends had attended when they were younger; similar to when they were younger, she is still the most developed.

Chizuko Oe (大江 千鶴子, Ōe Chizuko)

- Voiced by: Asami Sanada (Japanese); Melissa Fahn (Original series, Something More Beautiful (episodes 5-11) and I'm Home), Rebecca Forstadt (Something More Beautiful (episodes 1-4 and 12-14)) (English)

Chizuko is a cheerful and bright, short blonde-haired girl, and is the most innocent of the "Triomatic". For the most part she treats Suguru as a friend, almost like a brother, and is very loyal. Some of her comments suggest that she loves him as more than a friend, but that she has put them aside, feeling that her love is unrequited, and chooses to simply remain by Suguru’s side anyway. This notion is made somewhat evident when she states that Suguru won’t choose anyone among the “Triomatic”, because he values their friendship more than love.

Chizuko enjoys food a great deal and has an extremely adept sense of taste, being able to identify the exact restaurant that a dish has come from and the exact origins of ingredients. Chizuko will often scream with absolute delight when she tastes Mahoro's cooking. While some initially mistake it as a scream of fear or horror, her friends know that it is a sign of culinary approval.

In the manga, after the time lapse, it is shown that Chizuko went for her dream and became a popular author, most likely relating to food and taste.

Toshiya Hamaguchi (浜口 俊也, Hamaguchi Toshiya)

- Voiced by: Hideki Ogihara (Japanese); Dave Wittenberg (Original Series and Something More Beautiful), Erik Scott Kimerer (I'm Home) (English)

One of Suguru's male friends who shares his interest in dirty magazines. He has a crush on Minawa, which causes him much trouble because she doesn't understand his attempts to express his interest in her.

At the end of the anime, it is suggested that once Minawa is completely healed, Hamaguchi enters into a relationship with Minawa.

Kiyomi Kawahara (川原 清巳, Kawahara Kiyomi)

- Voiced by: Atsushi Kisaichi (Japanese); Tony Schnur (Original Series and Something More Beautiful), Keith Silverstein (I'm Home) (English)

One of Suguru's male friends who also enjoys looking at dirty magazines. He is a kendo student, and is usually with Suguru's other friend Toshiya.

In the manga, after the time lapse, Kiyomi is shown to be in a relationship with Suguru's friend and former classmate, Miyuki Sakura, and works at the bath house.

Yoshimi Tanaka (田中 佳美, Tanaka Yoshimi)

- Voiced by: Tomoko Kaneda (Japanese); Lia Sargent (English)

=== Vesper ===
Minato Hokaze (帆風 みなと, Hokaze Minato)

- Voiced by: Shinji Kawada (Japanese); Kirk Thornton (English)

A friend of Mahoro and her primary care giver, Minato is the scientist primarily responsible for the maintenance of Mahoro; he is also constantly asked by Mahoro to give her a bigger bust.

=== Saint ===
Tou Ryuga (流河 濤, Ryuga Tou)

- Voiced by: Takehito Koyasu (Japanese); Steve Blum (Original Series and Something More Beautiful), Keith Silverstein (I'm Home) (English)

Is a combat android seen in the first series as a science teacher. His task was to investigate the reason Mahoro was living as a maid. He also wanted to finish the battle with her to see who is the strongest android/warrior, during the final battle he discovers the reason she is living as a maid for Suguru and who the true warrior is. In the second series, he decides to live as a human and continues to teach at Suguru's school much to the irritation to Slash.

In the end of the anime, he visit the members of the Saint for the last time as they depart to another galaxy.

In the manga version, he marries one of his students whom he saved earlier, and becomes a father of a reborn Mahoro.

=== Management ===
Introduced in Something More Beautiful, Management is a top secret organization that had shaped the world from the shadows throughout its history. They are dedicated to destroying not only Saint, to preserve the order they established from alien influence, but Vesper as well, for having sympathy for Saint.

Feldrance (フェルドランス, Feldlance) (CODE: 227)

- Voiced by: Misato Sakamoto (Japanese); Mona Marshall (English)

A cold-hearted android in the form of a youth who was created by and works under the Management's robotics scientist Professor Mephlis during his scheme to take Mahoro for himself. However, Feldrance was actually working for the higher-ups to collect the data that Mephlis gathered on Mahoro. When Mephlis's plans failed, Feldrance made his move and killed the scientist before taking the data as his creator's lab explodes; he felt no remorse for betraying his creator, coldly pointing out that it was Mephlis, after all, who made Feldrance the way he is.

In the anime, he soon met his untimely end along with the death of Mahoro.

In the manga version, he chops Suguru's hands while capturing Mahoro but soon stopped by Slash and Ryuuga. He also witnessed the death of Mahoro to save mankind. In the epilogue, he was one of the last defenses of The Management in Mars. He encounters Suguru who kills him. With his last breath, he asks whether the quest of vengeance gave him satisfaction.

== Endings ==
=== Anime's ending ===
The finale is set on a Saint-Earth colony world, 20 years after Mahoro's "death" and the mutual defeat of Vesper and Management. Suguru left Japan, deciding never to return, and is now a renegade half-cyborg hunter of the last "Management holdouts." He has only memories of Earth, and a sole companion who later turns out to be an android and tries to kill him for the bounty on his head.

As Suguru is in critical condition, Mahoro reappears alive, asking to take him home.

=== Manga's ending ===
The ending is set on Earth, 20 years after Mahoro's death and the defeat of Management. Suguru has been working as a commander within Vesper, and has just returned to Earth from the final defeat of Management's last vestiges.

Unbeknownst to Suguru, Mahoro was reborn as a human shortly after her death as an android. She has grown up, and remembers Suguru. When Suguru returns from Vesper headquarters expecting to find an empty house, she is there waiting for him.

== Manga ==
Mahoromatic (まほろまてぃっく, Mahoromatikku) manga series by Bow Ditama and Bunjūrō Nakayama was originally serialized in Comic Gum magazine between December 1998 and July 26, 2004, and compiled into eight tankōbon volumes published by Wani Books. The special edition of the eight volume contained a crystal Mahoro, as well as a special cover. The English version was published by Tokyopop.

=== Volumes ===
No.	Title	Original release date	English release date
1	The Misato Residence's Maid "The maid of the Misato Residence" (「美里家のメイドさん」)	October 10, 1999; 4-8470-3326-4	May 1, 2004; 1-59182-729-9
2	Fun in the Sun "The maid, dizzy in the sunlight" (「陽射しくらくらメイドさん」)	July 10, 2000; 4-8470-3354-X	July 1, 2004; 1-59182-730-2
3	The Running Maid "The maid, chased by her past" (「過去に追われるメイドさん」)	March 3, 2001; 4-8470-3326-4	September 1, 2004; 1-59182-731-0
4	The Maid of Many Dreams "The maid, dreaming all sorts of things" (「いろいろ夢見るメイドさん」)	October 10, 2001; 4-8470-3413-9	December 15, 2004; 1-59182-732-9
5	The Ever-Energetic Maid "The maid, full of energy today too" (「今日も元気なメイドさん」)	June 10, 2002; 4-8470-3370-1	March 8, 2005; 1-59182-915-1
6	The Maid With The Wonderful Smile "The maid with the lovely smile" (「笑顔の素敵なメイドさん」)	March 3, 2003; 4-8470-3440-6	June 7, 2005; 1-59182-916-X
7	The Maid Moved By Tears "The maid who runs on tears" (「涙で動くメイドさん」)	October 10, 2003; 4-8470-3454-6	October 11, 2005; 1-59532-625-1
8	The Misato home's Mahoro-san "Mahoro-san of the Misato Residence" (「 美里家のまほろさん」)	December 5, 2004; 4-8470-3479-1	January 11, 2006; 1-59532-808-4

== Anime ==
The manga proved popular, and was adapted into two anime series jointly by Gainax and Shaft: Mahoromatic: Automatic Maiden and Mahoromatic: Something More Beautiful (まほろまてぃっく~もっと美しいもの~, Mahoromatikku: Motto Utsukushii Mono)

The first series consisted of twelve episodes and ran from September 10, 2001, to January 28, 2002, on BS-i in Japan, and more or less followed the manga to the third volume. The opening theme is "Kaerimichi" (Our Way Home) by Ayako Kawasumi and the ending theme is "Mahoro de MAMBO" by Triomatic (Asami Sanada, Manabi Mizuno, Yumi Kikuchi). It was directed by Hiroyuki Yamaga and features music by Toshio Masuda. Kazuhiro Takamura (from Gainax) designed the characters and served as chief animation director. Three episodes were outsourced outside of Shaft and Gainax: episode 2, produced at Studio Cats and Yuuhodou; and episode 7, produced at M.S.C.

The second series also followed the manga, culminating in the story's end. This series ran from September 26, 2002, till January 16, 2003. The opening theme is "So-re-i-yu" (Soleil (French for "Sun")) by Ayako Kawasumi and the ending theme is "Triomatic Ran! Ran! Ran!" by Triomatic. The second season features the returning staff as the first season, but with Yamaga and Jukki Hanada also taking up the role as series composition writers. Shouji Saeki, who worked on the first series, was also promoted as the series' assistant director. Episodes 3, 7, and 12 were outsourced to Artland.

Both seasons have an extra episode titled "End Year Special", shown after episode 10 and 12, respectively. These feature a refresher of all the events so far along with new conversations and discussions between characters.

A television special, Mahoromatic: Summer Special (まほろまてぃっく夏のTVスペシャル, Mahoromatikku Natsu no Terebi Supesharu), set in the days when Minawa had become a regular part of the household, was produced and aired on August 15, 2003.

A two episode special entitled Mahoromatic: I'm Home (まほろまてぃっく ただいま◇おかえり, Mahoromatic: Tadaima Okaeri) was announced on August 22, 2009. It aired on October 17 and October 24, 2009. It takes place during the second series, on days 270-268 of Mahoro's life timer. The opening theme is "Tadaima no Kaze" (ただいまの風; Returning Wind) by Ayako Kawasumi and the ending theme is "[Ma] no Tsuku Bugi!" ([ま]のつくブギ！; [Or] Take the Boogie) by Triomatic & Minawa & Mahoro. Saeki, the assistant director of the second season, directed the special, and both Masuda and Takamura returned from the prior seasons.

Originally the anime was licensed by Pioneer Entertainment (later Geneon Entertainment). As of October 2008, ADV Films had announced that they had regained licenses to both Mahoromatic, and Mahoromatic: Something More Beautiful, through its new Japanese licensor Sentai Filmworks. Currently, the anime is distributed by Sentai Filmworks (however, the '"Ep00 Special" and "End Year Specials" are absent). They also acquired Mahoromatic: I'm Home and released it in 2012, with the English dub produced at Bang Zoom! Entertainment.

Mahoromatic, including both seasons and the summer special, was available through the Anime Network's free video on demand service, found on many cable systems and DirecTV.

=== Mahoromatic: Automatic Maiden ===
==== Episodes ====
No.	Title	Directed by (Note: Information is taken from the ending credits of each episode.)	Written by	Storyboarded by	Original release date
1	"In the Garden Where the Hydrangeas Bloom"; Transliteration: "Ajisai no Saku Niwa de" (Japanese: 紫陽花の咲く庭で)	Shouji Saeki	Hiroyuki Yamaga	Shouji Saeki	October 6, 2001
2	"Woman Teacher Saori, 25 Years Old"; Transliteration: "Onna Kyoushi Saori Nijuugosai" (Japanese: 女教師沙織二十五歳)	Yuuji Himaki	Hiroyuki Yamaga	Kazuya Tsurumaki	October 13, 2001
3	"A Grave So Transient"; Transliteration: "Haka Arite Hakanaku" (Japanese: こんな冒険ありぃ~?)	Toshimasa Suzuki	Hiroyuki Yamaga	Toshimasa Suzuki	October 20, 2001
4	"Shoot Me Straight Through the Heart"; Transliteration: "Heart Uchinukimasu" (Japanese: ハート撃ち抜きます)	Shouji Saeki	Shouji Saeki	Shouji Saeki	October 27, 2001
5	"8-634 Is Doing Fine"; Transliteration: "8-no-634 wa Genki Desu" (Japanese: 8ノ634ハ元気デス)	Takatsugu Kobyashi	Hiroyuki Yamaga	Takatsugu Kobayashi	November 3, 2001
6	"Moon Flower Design"; Transliteration: "Gekka Shuushoku" (Japanese: 月花愁色)	Ken Andou	Shouji Saeki	Shouji Saeki	November 10, 2001
7	"The Maid Chased by Her Past"; Transliteration: "Kako ni Owareru Maid-san" (Japanese: 過去に追われるメイドさん)	Itsuro Kawasaki	Hiroyuki Yamaga	Itsuro Kawasaki	November 17, 2001
8	"One Who Has a Perfect Heart"; Transliteration: "Kanpeki na Kokoro no Mochinushi" (Japanese: 完璧な心の持ち主)	Yorifusa Yamaguchi	Hiroyuki Yamaga	Yorifusa Yamaguchi	November 24, 2001
9	"Limelight"; Transliteration: "Limelight" (Japanese: ライムライト ~LimeLight~)	Toshimasa Suzuki	Shouji Saeki	Shouji Saeki	December 1, 2001
10	"The Fate As a Warrior"; Transliteration: "Senshi to Shite no Shukumei" (Japanese: 戦士としての宿命)	Itsuro Kawasaki	Hiroyuki Yamaga	Itsuro Kawasaki	December 8, 2001
11	"A Person Precious to Me"; Transliteration: "Boku no Taisetsu na Ningen" (Japanese: ぼくの大切な人間)	Ken Andou	Hiroyuki Yamaga	Kazuya Tsurumaki	December 22, 2001
12	"To the Scenery I Once Dreamt Of"; Transliteration: "Itsuka Yumemita Fuukei ni" (Japanese: いつか夢見た風景に)	Shouji Saeki	Hiroyuki Yamaga; Shouji Saeki	Shouji Saeki	December 29, 2001

=== Mahoromatic: Something More Beautiful ===
==== Episodes ====
No.	Title	Directed by	Written by	Storyboarded by	Original release date
1	"Return of the Maid"; Transliteration: "Kaette Kita Maid-san" (Japanese: 帰ってきたメイドさん)	Hiroyuki Yamaga; Shouji Saeki	Shouji Saeki	Shouji Saeki	September 27, 2002
2	"From Today On, You Are Minawa"; Transliteration: "Kyou kara Minawa" (Japanese: きょうからみなわ)	Tatsuya Igarashi	Jukki Hanada	Shouji Saeki	October 4, 2002
3	"Dreams Should Be Grand"; Transliteration: "Yume wa Okkiku" (Japanese: 夢はおっきく)	Shinya Hanai	Sumio Uetake	Takatsugu Kobayashi	October 11, 2002
4	"Looking for a Lost Object"; Transliteration: "Sagashimono Mitsukemasu" (Japanese: 探し物見つけます)	Mitsuhiro Yoneda	Tomoyasu Ookubo	Mitsuhiro Yoneda	October 18, 2002
5	"Will I Catch a Cold Tomorrow?"; Transliteration: "Ashita wa Kaze ni Naru?" (Japanese: あしたはかぜになる?)	Koujirou Tsuruoka	Tomoyasu Ookubo	Shouji Saeki	October 25, 2002
6	"Doing Delightful New Year Things"; Transliteration: "Yare Medetayana" (Japanese: ヤレめでたやな)	Tatsuya Igarashi	Sumio Uetake	Shinichi Watanabe	November 1, 2002
7	"Don't Ever Come Back Again!"; Transliteration: "Ototoi Kiyagare!" (Japanese: おととい来やがれっ!)	Ryou Miyata	Tomoyasu Ookubo	Hiroshi Hara; Shouji Saeki	November 8, 2002
8	"Grandfather and Grandson"; Transliteration: "Ooji to Mago" (Japanese: 祖父と孫と)	Shin Itagaki	Tomoyasu Ookubo; Shouji Saeki	Kazuma Fujimori	November 15, 2002
9	"Sweeter Than Love, but a Bit Bitter"; Transliteration: "Ai Yori Amashi, Chobitto Kuji" (Japanese: 愛より甘し ちょびっと苦し)	Shinichi Watanabe	Jukki Hanada	Shinichi Watanabe	November 22, 2002
10	"Things I Like"; Transliteration: "Watashi no Suki na Mono" (Japanese: わたしの好きなもの)	Koujirou Tsuruoka	Sumio Uetake	Shouji Saeki	November 29, 2002
11	"A Wish, the Color of Cherry Blossoms"; Transliteration: "Negai, Sakura'iro" (Japanese: 願い, 桜色)	Shouji Saeki	Jukki Hanada	Shouoji Saeki	December 7, 2002
12	"The Annunciation"; Transliteration: "Jutaikokuchi" (Japanese: 受胎告知)	Tatsuyuki Nagai	Hiroyuki Yamaga	Katsuichi Nakayama	December 14, 2002
13	"End of a Dream"; Transliteration: "Yume no Owari" (Japanese: ユメノオワリ)	Shinichi Watanabe	Hiroyuki Yamaga	Toshimasa Suzuki	January 10, 2003
14	"Na-Geanna"; Transliteration: "Na-Geanna" (Japanese: ナジェーナ)	Hiroyuki Yamaga	Hiroyuki Yamaga	Hiroyuki Yamaga	January 17, 2003
Special	"Summer Special"; Transliteration: "Natsu no TV Special" (Japanese: 夏のTVスペシャル)	Shouji Saeki	Bunjuro Nakayama	Shouji Saeki	August 15, 2003

=== Mahoromatic: I'm Home ===
Takes place during the second season between episodes 2 and 3, on days 270–268 of Mahoro's life timer. Mahoro and Suguru, along with Suguru's classmates, are preparing for a Hiryu town festival, when Feldlance attacks in an attempt to capture Minawa.

==== Episodes ====
No.	Title	Directed by	Written by	Storyboarded by	Original release date
1	"The Returning Wind"; Transliteration: "Tadaima no Kaze" (Japanese: ただいまの風)	Yutaka Uemura	Tatsuhiko Urahata	Shouji Saeki	October 19, 2009
2	"The Returning Sky"; Transliteration: "Okaeri no Sora" (Japanese: おかえりの空)	Yutaka Uemura	Tatsuhiko Urahata	Shouji Saeki	October 25, 2009

== DVDs ==
Japan releases include 6 and 7 discs for first and second television series, Year End Special, Summer Special.

Pioneer/Geneon's North America release include:

- Mahoromatic - Automatic Maiden:

- 4 discs with 3 from 1st television series (4 episodes each), Summer Special disc

- Mahoromatic II- Something More Beautiful:

- 3 discs with 14 episodes total (4 episodes for Maid in Training disc, 5 episodes for others)

A series of four DVDs was released in Europe for season one, each DVD containing 3 episodes.

Sentai Filmworks re-released Mahoromatic: Automatic Maiden in 2 DVDs as Collection 1, which includes only the episodes found in Geneon's release and excluding Summer Special. Mahoromatic: Something More Beautiful was also released in 3 DVDs as Collection 2, which includes Geneon's release episodes, and Mahoromatic: Summer Special OVA. Both collections were also available in Full Metal Maid or Ultimate Collection releases. Mahoromatic: I'm Home! was released as a separate disc, or part of Ultimate Collection.

== Music CDs ==
Music CDs, including dramas were released in Japan. Several of these CDs were later released in the United States with cover book translations.

== Merchandise ==
Gashapon sets were produced in 2005 featuring Mahoro and Minawa in their maid costumes.

A PlayStation 2 game by Konami of the same name was also produced for the series. It followed the style of a visual novel with full voiceovers and text accompanying pictures and minigames.
