= Bow Ditama =

Japanese manga artist and illustrator

Bow Ditama (ぢたま(某), Ditama Bō)
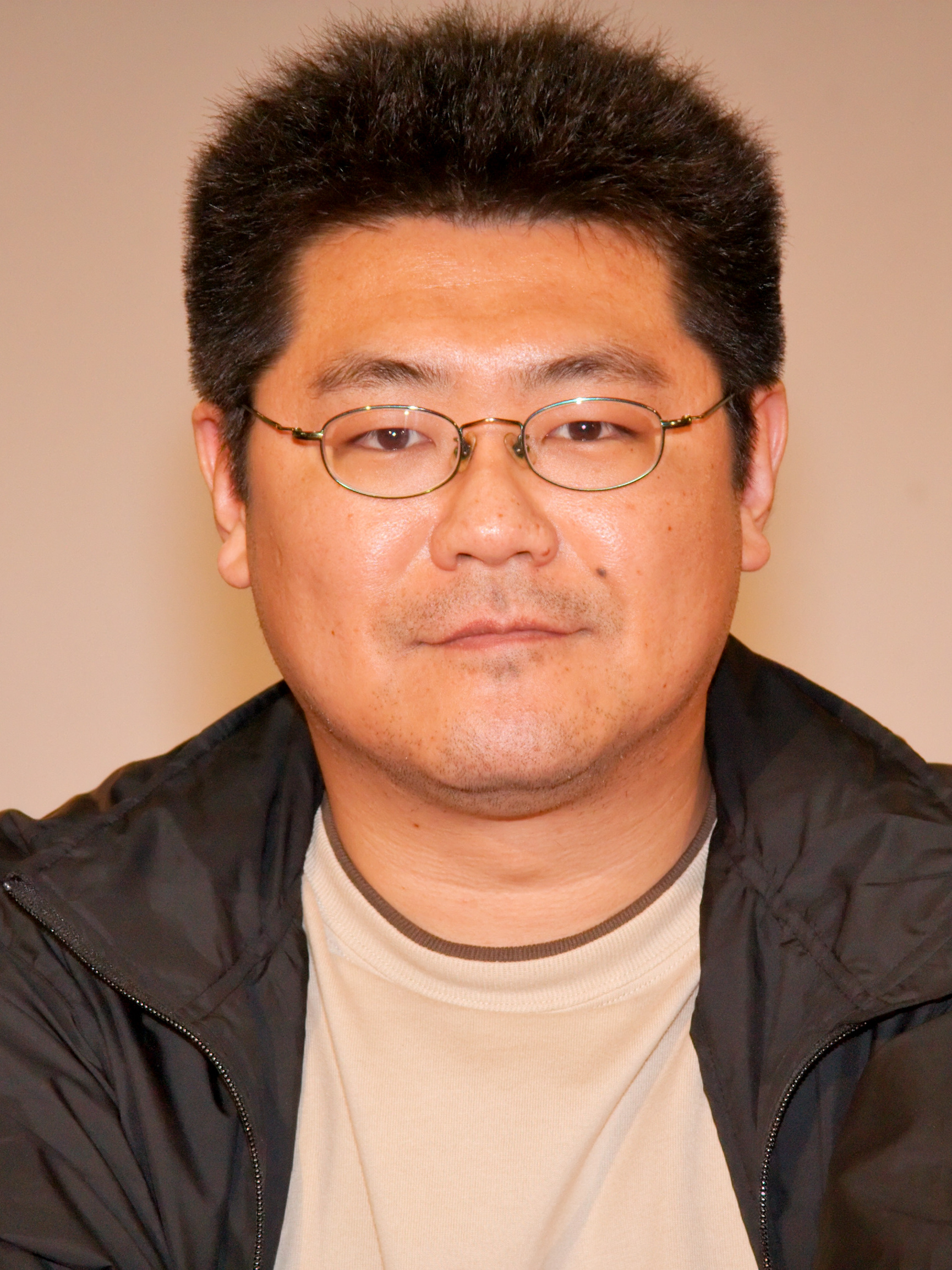
- Bow Ditama in Paris in 2008
- Born: May 6th Inazawa City, Aichi Prefecture, Japan
- Areas: Manga artist, illustrator
- Notable works: Kissxsis; Mahoromatic

Bow Ditama (ぢたま(某), Ditama Bō) is a Japanese manga artist and illustrator, best known for the creation of the Kissxsis series. His first major commercial work was in collaboration with writer Bunjūrō Nakayama as the illustrator of Mahoromatic. He has been active since 1990, and started his career making hentai dōjinshi. His first work was the series I like, because I like in the hentai manga magazine Dolphin Comics, starting in 1994. He has penned six hentai manga (one, Kibun Kibun, being two volumes long and also adapted into an anime), and four general manga. He enjoys shōjo manga as well. Several of his series contain omorashi as a main element.

== List of works ==
=== Hentai ===
- I like, because I like (1995) Reprint: (2000)
- Seinaru Gyouzui (1996)
- nothing but... (1997) Reprint: (2000)
- Kibun Kibun (1999–2001: 2 volumes)
- Super Love Potion (2005)

=== Other manga ===
- Mahoromatic (1999–2004: 8 volumes, art only)
- Fight Ippatsu! Jūden-chan!! (2006–2013: 10 volumes)
- Kissxsis (2005–2021: 25 volumes)
- Shougakusei Ga Mama Demo Ii Desuka? (2017–2020: 4 volumes)
