= Brothers Conflict =

Japanese media franchise

- Cover of the first novel volume

ブラザーズ コンフリクト (Burazāzu Konfurikuto)
- Genre: Romance
- Novel series
- Written by: Atsuko Kanase; Takeshi Mizuno
- Illustrated by: Udajo
- Published by: ASCII Media Works
- Magazine: Sylph
- Original run: December 22, 2010 – July 21, 2012
- Volumes: 7
Further information
Video game
Brothers Conflict: Passion Pink
Developer	Idea Factory
Publisher	Otomate
Genre	Otome
Platform	PlayStation Portable
Released	May 17, 2012
Manga
Brothers Conflict Purupuru
Written by	Takeshi Mizuno
Illustrated by	Deathco Cotorino
Published by	ASCII Media Works
Magazine	Sylph
Original run	November 2012 – October 2013
Volumes	2
Novel series
Brothers Conflict: Second Season
Written by	Atsuko Kanase; Takeshi Mizuno
Illustrated by	Udajo
Published by	ASCII Media Works
Original run	January 22, 2013 – February 22, 2014
Volumes	5
Anime television series
Directed by	Atsushi Matsumoto
Produced by	Kozue Kaneniwa; Asuka Yamazaki; Fuminori Yamazaki; Mika Sugimoto; Mie Inaba; Kenji Satō
Written by	Natsuko Takahashi
Music by	Takeshi Nakatsuka
Studio	Brain's Base
Licensed by	NA: Crunchyroll; UK: Anime Limited
Original network	AT-X
English network	NA: Funimation Channel, Crunchyroll Channel; SEA: Animax Asia
Original run	July 2, 2013 – September 17, 2013
Episodes	12 + 1 Special
Video game
Brothers Conflict: Brilliant Blue
Developer	Idea Factory
Publisher	Otomate
Genre	Otome
Platform	PlayStation Portable
Released	September 12, 2013
Original video animation
Directed by	Atsushi Matsumoto
Studio	Brain's Base
Licensed by	NA: Crunchyroll; UK: Anime Limited
Released	December 19, 2014 – February 11, 2015
Runtime	22 minutes each
Episodes	2
Video game
Brothers Conflict: Precious Baby
Developer	Idea Factory
Publisher	Otomate
Genre	Otome
Platform	PlayStation Vita; Nintendo Switch
Released	PlayStation Vita; April 7, 2016; Nintendo Switch; August 29, 2019

Brothers Conflict (ブラザーズ コンフリクト, Burazāzu Konfurikuto), also known as BroCon (ブラコン, Burakon), is a Japanese novel series created by Atsuko Kanase, written by Takeshi Mizuno and Kanase, and illustrated by Udajo. It has been adapted into two PlayStation Portable video games by Idea Factory, yonkoma manga, and an anime television series. The 12-episode anime aired between July and September 2013. It is animated by Brain's Base. Funimation acquired the North American streaming rights for the anime. Funimation released a "The Complete Series + OVA - Limited Edition Blu-ray & DVD" on March 8, 2016.

== Plot ==
Ema Hinata (or later known as Ema Asahina) is the daughter of the famous expat, Rintaro Hinata. One day, she finds out that her dad is going to remarry a successful clothing maker named Miwa Asahina. Rather than bothering them, Ema decides to move into the Sunrise Residence complex owned by Miwa. From there, Ema discovers that she has 13 stepbrothers. As time moves on, her stepbrothers develop feelings for her and compete in ways to win her heart when all Ema wants to have is a loving family.

== Characters ==
=== Main characters ===
Ema Hinata (朝日奈 絵麻, Hinata Ema)
Voiced by: Rina Satō (Japanese); Colleen Clinkenbeard (English)
The daughter of the well-known adventurer, Rintaro Hinata. She is 17 years old and a high school senior at Hinode High School. After her father remarries, she moves in with her 13 new stepbrothers. She is very good at cooking. Her father was always away working, leaving Ema to take care of herself, but now, with her new family, she feels happy and safe. She has a talking pet squirrel named Juli who is always saying that her new family is a pack of wolves and that she must always be well aware of her surroundings. Juli can only communicate with Ema and (as it is later revealed) Louis. Both Juli and Louis call Ema "Chi". It is later revealed that Ema is adopted, as her real parents had died. At first, this revelation causes a problem for Ema because her father had never told her. However, Louis helps her through this by sharing his own experience as an adoptee. Juli also reassures her of her father's love.
Masaomi Asahina (朝日奈 雅臣, Asahina Masaomi)
Voiced by: Kazuyuki Okitsu (Japanese); J. Michael Tatum (English)
Masaomi is the oldest son of the Asahina family at 31 years old. He is a doctor who is well-versed in medicine. As the oldest, Masaomi has to look after his younger brothers his whole life and would give anything for them.
Ukyō Asahina (朝日奈 右京, Asahina Ukyō)
Voiced by: Daisuke Hirakawa (Japanese); Christopher R. Sabat (English)
Ukyō is the second son of the Asahina family at 29 years old. He is a successful lawyer and acts as the "mother figure" to the family. Calm and intelligent, Ukyō normally does house chores and helps the other siblings study for school.
Kaname Asahina (朝日奈 要, Asahina Kaname)
Voiced by: Junichi Suwabe (Japanese); Ian Sinclair (English)
Kaname is the third son of the Asahina family at 27 years old. He acts like a playboy, but works as a Buddhist monk. The other brothers do not take him seriously and Ukyo is frequently scolding him for his inappropriate behavior, but Kaname can be much more responsible than his carefree nature suggests.
Hikaru Asahina (朝日奈 光, Asahina Hikaru)
Voiced by: Nobuhiko Okamoto (Japanese); Todd Haberkorn (English)
Hikaru is the fourth son of the Asahina family at 26 years old. He is a novelist who likes watching his brothers' reactions around Ema. Hikaru is intelligent, yet a bit manipulative. He seems to know that almost every one of his brothers has feelings toward Ema, and even makes an odds chart called "Brothers Conflict" as his hobby.
Tsubaki Asahina (朝日奈 椿, Asahina Tsubaki)
Voiced by: Kenichi Suzumura (Japanese); Micah Solusod (English)
Tsubaki is the fifth son of the Asahina family and oldest of the triplets at 24 years old. He is a voice actor alongside his identical twin, Azusa. Tsubaki is cheeky and pushy, but hard-working and passionate about his career.
Azusa Asahina (朝日奈 梓, Asahina Azusa)
Voiced by: Kōsuke Toriumi (Japanese); Jessie James Grelle (English)
Azusa is the sixth son of the Asahina family and the second-oldest triplet at 24 years old. Like his identical triplet brother Tsubaki, he is a voice actor. However, Azusa is calmer and much less tenacious than Tsubaki, usually being one to keep him in check. He is intelligent and talented, but relies on Tsubaki too much.
Natsume Asahina (朝日奈 棗, Asahina Natsume)
Voiced by: Tomoaki Maeno (Japanese); Kyle Hebert (English)
Natsume is the seventh son of the Asahina family and the youngest triplet at 24 years old. Unlike Tsubaki and Azusa, he is a fraternal triplet and lives alone at the apartment. He works at the video game company that makes one of Ema's favorite video games, Zombie Hazard.
Louis Asahina (朝日奈 琉生, Asahina Rui)
Voiced by: Ken Takeuchi (Japanese); Jerry Jewell (English)
The eighth son of the Asahina family, Louis is a 22-year-old hairdresser who speaks slowly and never seems to be paying attention. However, he still cares for his brothers. Louis is the only other person besides Ema who can communicate with Juli, and promises him that they will protect Ema.
Subaru Asahina (朝日奈 昴, Asahina Subaru)
Voiced by: Daisuke Ono (Japanese); David Matranga (English)
The ninth son of the Asahina family, Subaru is an athletic college sophomore who is part of his college's basketball team. He wants to play professionally and eventually is offered a chance to do so. Subaru does not understand girls nor does he know how to deal with them, so he often gets tense around Ema.
Iori Asahina (朝日奈 祈織, Asahina Iori)
Voiced by: Daisuke Namikawa (Japanese); Eric Vale (English)
The tenth son of the Asahina family, Iori is an 18-year-old high school student at Bright Centrair Private Academy. He works part-time at a coffeehouse and is known for his prince-like behavior, making him lovable at school.
Yūsuke Asahina (朝日奈 侑介, Asahina Yūsuke)
Voiced by: Yoshimasa Hosoya (Japanese); Matthew Mercer (English)
The eleventh son of the Asahina family, Yūsuke is a senior high school student and also Ema's classmate. He has a righteous personality and hates anything to be incorrect.
Fūto Asahina (朝日奈 風斗, Asahina Fūto)
Voiced by: Kenn (Japanese); Vic Mignogna (English)
The twelfth son of the Asahina family, Fūto is a 15-year-old first year high school student. He has a devilish and cheeky personality, being bratty to his siblings. However, Fūto can be mature for his age, determined and passionate in his career.
Wataru Asahina (朝日奈 弥, Asahina Wataru)
Voiced by: Yūki Kaji (Japanese); Bryce Papenbrook (English)
The thirteenth and youngest son of the Asahina family, Wataru is a ten-year-old fifth grade elementary schoolboy. He is sweet and honest, but spoiled by his over-protective brothers.

=== Other characters ===
Juli (ジュリ, Juri)
Voiced by: Hiroshi Kamiya (Japanese); Sonny Strait (English)
Juli is Ema's talking pet squirrel who can only talk to her and Louis. He has been with Ema since she was young, always looking out for her and making sure none of the brothers will.
Kazuma Sasakura (佐々倉 和馬, Sasakura Kazuma)
Voiced by: Kazunori Nomiya (Japanese); Ricco Fajardo (English)
Kazuma is Ema and Yusuke's classmate at Hinode High School. He handles the Cultural Festival for their class.
Mahoko Imai (今井 真秀子, Imai Mahoko)
Voiced by: Saya Shinomiya (Japanese); Lindsay Seidel (English)
Mahoko is Ema and Yusuke's classmate at Hinode High School who is also the former's best friend. She is a fan of Ema and Yusuke's brother, Futo. Mahoko playfully addresses Yusuke as "Futo Asahina's brother", causing him to get annoyed.
Chiaki (千秋)
Voiced by: Akira Ishida (Japanese); Joel McDonald (English)
Chiaki is Kaname's co-worker from Club Buddha. He is called "Chi" by Kaname.
Ryūsei (隆生)
Voiced by: Show Hayami
Ryūsei is Kaname's co-worker from Club Buddha who gives advice to Ema in episode 10. He tells her that family love is true love, which means he understands her current situation.
Rintarō Hinata (日向 麟太郎, Hinata Rintarō)
Voiced by: Masaki Terasoma (Japanese); David Wald (English)
Rintarō is Ema's adoptive father, Miwa's husband, and stepfather of the Asahina brothers. He is a well-known adventurer who travels around the world.
Miwa Asahina (朝日奈 美和, Asahina Miwa)
Voiced by: Kikuko Inoue (Japanese); Jamie Marchi (English)
The mother of the Asahina brothers, Rintaro's wife and Ema's stepmother. She is a full-time career woman who works overseas.
Kaori Kishida (岸田香织, Kishida Kaori)
Voiced by: Kyoko Hikami (Japanese); Morgan Garrett (English)
Kaori is a teacher at Hinode High School. She is the Homeroom teacher of Ema, Yuusuke, Mahoko and Kazuma.

== Media ==
=== Novel Series ===
Volume number	Release date	ISBN
1	December 22, 2010	ISBN 978-4-04-870194-5
2	April 22, 2011	ISBN 978-4-04-870484-7
3	September 22, 2011	ISBN 978-4-04-870889-0
4	November 22, 2011	ISBN 978-4-04-870975-0
5	January 21, 2012	ISBN 978-4-04-886289-9
6	March 22, 2012	ISBN 978-4-04-886500-5
7	July 21, 2012	ISBN 978-4-04-886719-1
Brothers Conflict 2nd Season
1	January 22, 2013	ISBN 978-4-04-891292-1
2	June 22, 2013	ISBN 978-4-04-891786-5
3	August 22, 2013	ISBN 978-4-04-891789-6
4	November 22, 2013	ISBN 978-4-04-866102-7
5	February 22, 2014	ISBN 978-4-04-866255-0

=== Manga ===
Brothers Conflict Purupuru is a spin-off manga the light novel featuring the characters from the novel in chibi form. Brothers Conflict feat. Natsume tells the story in Natsume's point of view. Other manga hat tell the story from other points of view, including Brothers Conflict feat. Yusuke & Futo and Brothers Conflict feat. Tsubaki & Azusa.

Number of volumes	Release date	ISBN
Brothers Conflict: Puru-puru Pururu 1	April 22, 2013	ISBN 978-4-04-891619-6
Brothers Conflict: Puru-puru Pururu 2	September 21, 2013	ISBN 978-4-04-891790-2

=== Brothers Conflict: Puru-puru Pururu ===
Number of volumes	Release date	ISBN
1	July 18, 2014	ISBN 978-4-04-866714-2

=== Brothers Conflict feat. Natsume ===
Number of volumes	Release date	ISBN
1	July 22, 2013	ISBN 978-4-04-891787-2
2	February 22, 2014	ISBN 978-4-04-866254-3

=== Brothers Conflict feat. Yusuke & Futo and Tsubaki & Azusa ===
Title	Release date	ISBN
Brothers Conflict feat.Tsubaki & Azusa	July 22, 2013	ISBN 978-4-04-891788-9
Brothers Conflict feat. Yusuke & Futo	January 22, 2014	ISBN 978-4-04-866253-6

Brothers Conflict Short Stories is a compilation of all the short stories that were previously featured on Sylph and Dengeki Girl's Style. A drama CD, titled Brothers Conflict: Let's Have a Pink Steamy Romance Together (Brothers Conflict 一緒に桃色湯けむりロマンスを, Brothers Conflict: Issho ni Momoiro Yukemuri Romansu o), was adapted into a novel.

Book title	Japan	
Book title	Release date	ISBN
Brothers Conflict Short Stories	February 22, 2013	ISBN 978-4-04-891294-5
Brothers Conflict 13Bros. Maniax	February 22, 2014	ISBN 978-4-04-866346-5
Brothers Conflict: 13Bros. Collection	December 22, 2014	ISBN 978-4-04-869125-3
Brothers Conflict Anthology: Beloved Pink	March 19, 2015	ISBN 978-4-04-869281-6
Brothers Conflict Anthology: Perfect Pink	March 19, 2015	ISBN 978-4-04-869283-0
Brothers Conflict: Let's Have a Pink Steamy Romance Together (Brothers Conflict 一緒に桃色湯けむりロマンスを, Brothers Conflict: Issho ni Momoiro Yukemuri Romansu o)	April 22, 2016	ISBN 978-4-04-865893-5
BROTHERS CONFLICT GIMME THE LOVE!!	January 21, 2017	ISBN 978-4-04-892686-7

=== Video games ===
The original novels have also inspired otome visual novel adaptions. The first game, titled Brothers Conflict: Passion Pink, was developed by Idea Factory and published under their Otomate brand released on May 17, 2012, for the PlayStation Portable.

A second game, titled Brothers Conflict: Brilliant Blue, was released on September 12, 2013.

A compilation game, meant to serve as the port of both games to the PlayStation Vita, titled Brothers Conflict: Precious Baby, was announced at the Otomate Party 2015. The game was released for the PlayStation Vita on April 7, 2016. The game was later ported to the Nintendo Switch on August 29, 2019.

=== Anime ===
A 12-episode anime adaptation was produced by Brain's Base and directed by Atsushi Matsumoto. It premiered July 2, 2013. The opening theme is "Beloved Survival" by Gero, who is famous on a video-sharing website, Nico Nico Douga. The ending theme, "14 to 1", is performed Asahina Bros.+Juli. The group is composed of Kazuyuki Okitsu, Daisuke Hirakawa, Junichi Suwabe, Nobuhiko Okamoto, Kenichi Suzumura, Kohsuke Toriumi, Tomoaki Maeno, Ken Takeuchi, Daisuke Ono, Daisuke Namikawa, Yoshimasa Hosoya, Kenn, Yūki Kaji, and Hiroshi Kamiya. It was released in Japan on February 26, 2014, on DVD and Blu-ray alongside the special episode. Apart from streaming rights, Funimation released the series on Blu-ray and DVD on March 8, 2016.

==== Episode list ====
No.	Title	Original release date
1	"The First Conflict: Brothers"; Transliteration: "Dai-ichi Shōtotsu: Kyōdai" (Japanese: 第一衝突: 兄弟)	July 2, 2013
After her father becomes engaged, Ema and her pet squirrel, Juli, have to move in with her thirteen new stepbrothers. She into the living room where the twins, Tsubaki and Azusa, are apparently confessing their love to each other. Ema runs away when Tsubaki tells her that he indeed confessed to Azusa, but before she does, he laughs at her, explaining that the two of them are voice actors and that they are only rehearsing from a script. Ema eventually arrives back in her room and lays in her bed, wondering what adventure she had just got herself into.
2	"The Second Conflict: Confusion"; Transliteration: "Dai-ni shōtotsu: Konran" (Japanese: 第二衝突: 混乱)	July 9, 2013
Ema helps Ukyo make breakfast for the brothers and goes to school with Yusuke. The next day, she visits a media store and sees Futo. Ema loudly calls out his name, which promptly blows his "cover". He shoves his CD into her hands and commands Ema to rent them for him before rushing off. At home, she gives the CD to Futo, who gives a "punishment" in her room.
3	"The Third Conflict: Promise"; Transliteration: "Dai-san Shōtotsu: Yakusoku" (Japanese: 第三衝突: 約束)	July 16, 2013
Louis and Ema are planning to get married when she meets the cross-dressing fourth son, Hikaru. On the day of the wedding, Louis does Ema's hair and she puts on the dress her step-mother and father got for her. When Ema walks into the chapel she meets the last of her brothers, Tsubaki and Azusa's triplet. Ema finds out later that Natsume works at one of her favorite game company, and he offers to give her samples of the new games if she wants. He also asks how Subaru is but she told him that she did not know know, then Natsume takes a business call. At the end, the boys welcome Ema to their family properly.
4	"The Fourth Conflict: Jealousy"; Transliteration: "Dai-shi shōtotsu: Shitto" (Japanese: 第四衝突: 嫉妬)	July 23, 2013
Tsubaki and Azusa find out that the first anime they ever worked on has been renewed for a second season. Thrilled, they both participate in auditions where Tsubaki as the lead and Azusa casts as his rival. Tsubaki later finds out that he did not get picked to be his character instead, Azusa did. Tsubaki kisses Ema and says "for a guy to get back on his feet all he needs is a kiss from a cute girl". He kisses her again, in shock she does not fight back.
5	"The Fifth Conflict: Submersion"; Transliteration: "Dai-Go Shōtotsu: Shinsui" (Japanese: 第五衝突: 浸水)	July 30, 2013
Natsume arrives just before Ema goes off to buy drinks, with Subaru joining them meeting Ema on the road. They decide to go home and Natsume takes a shower. He decides to stay home for a while, still curious over the connection between Subaru and Ema. The next day, Juli gets sick from eating too much nuts. Ema decides to go to Subaru's basketball game, despite Juli's protests, where she meets Natsume. Natsume offers her a ride after the game since it begins to rain, but gets a phone call and leaves for a bit. Subaru rushes over despite having another game later on and confesses that he hopes that she can be at his side forever.
6	"The Sixth Conflict: Photos"; Transliteration: "Dai-Roku Shōtotsu: Shashin" (Japanese: 第六衝突: 写真)	August 6, 2013
Futo enters to the same high school Ema goes to. The stepbrothers and Ema decide to look at baby pictures and Ema finds one of Azusa. Azusa gives Ema a photo album because she never had her own album before. While Ema is downstairs putting pictures into her album, Tsubaki comes and then kisses her again and tells her he really likes her. Azusa pushes Tsubaki off Ema. Then, Azusa tells her that he has no right to scold Tsubaki since he feels the same way.
7	"The Seventh Conflict: Breaking Point"; Transliteration: "Dai-Nana Shōtotsu: Genkai" (Japanese: 第七衝突: 限界)	August 13, 2013
Futo is in a new commercial, leading the family to begin plans for an oversees trip during summer vacation in order for Ema and Yusuke to take a break from exams. The next day, Azusa comes into the kitchen where Ema is and falls after feeling dizzy. After an argument with Ema, Tsubaki gets mad and Azusa tries to convince him, but he passes out in the middle of the argument.
8	"The Eighth Conflict: Nightmare"; Transliteration: "Dai-hachi shōtotsu: Akumu" (Japanese: 第八衝突: 悪夢)	August 20, 2013
Azusa collapses on the floor and Tsubaki and Ema stand to see Azusa collapses, seen as in the last episode. Masaomi walks in and tells Ema to call an ambulance. Azusa is then seen in the hospital bed, still unconscious, but stable. Ema goes home to find Tsubaki with his face in his hands. He tells her that he can no longer feel the connection that he had with Azusa as twins. He also tells her that he has no right to visit him, because he was probably the cause for his collapse. That night, he has multiple nightmares about his job, Azusa's life, and Ema's affections for him. Tsubaki finally wakes up to Natsume's worried face. The next day, Ema goes to visit Azusa with a change of clothes and Azusa tells her that he just has meningitis and that he will be released sooner or later. Ema also thanks him for stopping Tsubaki the other night, but Azusa suddenly replies that she shouldn't be thanking him.
9	"The Ninth Conflict: Vision"; Transliteration: "Dai-kyo shōtotsu: Bijon" (Japanese: 第九衝突: 夢幻)	August 27, 2013
Ema finds out the truth about her identity, that she is the adopted daughter of Rintarō.
10	"The Tenth Conflict: Enlightenment"; Transliteration: "Daiju shōtotsu: Higan" (Japanese: 第十衝突: 彼岸)	September 3, 2013
As the family trip is cancelled due to everyone's busy schedule, Kaname invites everyone to his buddha club event, which he hosts. That night, Kaname thanks Ema for coming. Futo goes to Ema's room while she is sleeping and tries to rape her but stops and says he can't see her as family as he loves her. On their way home, the brothers take Ema to visit the graves of her birth parents and she thanks them for having her.
11	"The Eleventh Conflict: Love-Hate"; Transliteration: "Dai-jū-ichi shōtotsu: Aizō" (Japanese: 第十一衝突:愛憎)	September 10, 2013
Ema is upset that her grades have dropped since returning from vacation and her entrance exam is drawing near. Noticing her looking down, the Asahina brothers try to cheer her up by making food and giving her good luck charm. On exam day, they wish Ema good luck to cheer her up. Later, Ema stands outside Subaru's door and tells him that Natsume was delighted to hear about his career, causing Subaru to be surprised. The next morning, Subaru leaves the condo and tells Ema that he regrets that he blamed Natsume so much and tells her to forget everything he said to her earlier as he leaves.
12	"The Twelfth Conflict: Romance"; Transliteration: "Dai-jūni no shototsu: Denki" (Japanese: 第十二衝突:伝奇)	September 17, 2013
After Subaru's departure, Ema is worried about him if he is having some problems in living alone. On her acceptance in university everyone congratulated her and Ema says goodbye to Kaname and Iori. Before leaving, Kaname asks her to call him "Oni-chan" once and Iori tells her to take care of her flowers and not forget him.
