= Izumo: Takeki Tsurugi no Senki =

Japanese anime television series

IZUMO:猛き剣の閃記 (IZUMO:Takeki Tsurugi no Senki)
- Video game

Izumo 2
- Developer: Studio E-Go!
- Anime television series
- Directed by: Tsuneo Tominaga
- Produced by: Hiroaki Inoue
- Music by: Myu
- Studio: Trinet Entertainment, Studio Kuma
- Licensed by: NA: Discotek Media
- Original network: Chiba Television Broadcasting, Kyoto Broadcasting System, Kids Station, Sun Television, Aichi Television Broadcasting, Television Kanagawa, Television Saitama
- Original run: April 3, 2005 – June 19, 2005
- Episodes: 12

Izumo: Takeki Tsurugi no Senki (IZUMO:猛き剣の閃記, IZUMO: Takeki Tsurugi no Senki lit. Izumo: Flash of a Brave Sword) is a 2005 Japanese anime television series with 12 episodes by Trinet Entertainment and Studio Kuma, which is the sequel to the hentai OVA Izumo. It is based on the eroge Izumo 2 developed by Studio E-Go!.

The anime is licensed by Discotek Media and was released on DVD in February 2017.

== Story ==
Yagi Takeru has been living in the Tōma family's house since his parents are gone. He was raised by Tōma Rokunosuke, the head of the house. He is surrounded by many people such as Yamato Takeshi, his best friend/rival from the kendo club, the Shiratori sisters, Kotono and Asuka, and his childhood friend, Osu Seri. Life has been blissful until one day, an earthquake strikes the school and everything changes. Takeru awakens to find that the school looks as if it has been abandoned for centuries and reduced to ruins. He also realizes that all the teachers and students have disappeared as well. He meets up with Seri and Asuka and they fled from the ruins, only to realize that the town they used to live in is completely empty. Subsequently, people wrapped in cloaks appear before him. They were told that they have been brought to another world. Takeru had been given the duty to intercourse the princess of this world and give birth to the warrior who will eventually change the world

== Characters ==
Characters	Voice actors
Yagi Takeru	Hideki Ogihara
Yamato Takeshi	Hiro Yuki
Kitagawa Mai	Kotomi Yamakawa
Osu Seri	Chemi Ishimatsu
Sakuya	Oma Ichimura
Shiratori Asuka	Noriko Rikimaru
Shiratori Kotono	Hyosei

== Episode list ==
1. Call in a Dream
2. Strange World
3. Separated Friends
4. Form of this World
5. The Attack
6. Four Heavenly Beasts
7. Fortress of the Duel
8. A Peaceful Moment
9. Returning
10. Yomotsuhirasaka
11. Raging Life
12. Two Souls

== Theme songs ==
- Opening theme: Romantic Chaser by Sae
- Ending theme: Saishin Dream (最新Dream, Latest Dream) by Clover
