= This Ugly yet Beautiful World =

Japanese anime television series

- North American cover of the first DVD.

この醜くも美しい世界 (Kono Minikuku mo Utsukushii Sekai)
- Genre: Science fiction
- Created by: Gainax
- Manga
- Illustrated by: Ashita Morimi
- Published by: Hakusensha
- English publisher: NA: Tokyopop
- Magazine: Young Animal
- Original run: December 26, 2003 – April 8, 2005
- Volumes: 3
- Anime television series
- Directed by: Shouji Saeki
- Produced by: Takeshi Shingūji (TBS); Yūichi Sekido (Pioneer LDC); Hiroki Satou (Gainax)
- Written by: Hiroyuki Yamaga; Shouji Saeki
- Music by: Takeshi Watanabe
- Studio: Gainax; Shaft
- Licensed by: NA: ADV Films (formerly); AEsir Holdings (currently)
- Original network: BS-i
- English network: NA: Anime Network; UK: Propeller TV
- Original run: April 2, 2004 – June 18, 2004
- Episodes: 12

This Ugly yet Beautiful World (この醜くも美しい世界, Kono Minikuku mo Utsukushii Sekai) is a Japanese anime television series created by Shouji Saeki and Hiroyuki Yamaga. It was animated by Gainax and Shaft.

The series aired on BS-i from April 2, 2004, to June 18, 2004, totaling 12 episodes. A manga adaptation, illustrated by Ashita Morimi, was serialized in Hakusensha's Young Animal.

== Plot ==
Takeru and Ryou are high school students who work doing deliveries for the former's uncle. One night, the two go to investigate a mysterious light in the woods only to find a young girl emerging from the light. Takeru and Ryou are attacked by an alien, which is defeated when Takeru transforms into a powerful and strange-looking beast himself. The girl, whom the boys name "Hikari" (light), is taken in by Takeru when she confesses to having no memory of who she is.

They are later joined by Jennifer Portman, an American scientist with an interest in the boys and Hikari; Ioneos, a shape-shifting robot loyal to Hikari; Kuon, a little floating alien; and Akari, Hikari's "sister", who also appeared just as Hikari did. The series follows the daily lives of its characters as they learn about the human condition, Hikari and Akari's alien origins, and face the incoming monsters and catastrophes.

== Characters ==
=== Main characters ===
Takeru Takemoto (竹本タケル, Takemoto Takeru)
Voiced by: Takahiro Mizushima (Japanese); Braden Hunt (English)
Takeru Takemoto is the series' main character. He comes off as a lazy and unmotivated teenager, but is really just unsure of his place in the world. He found and named Hikari in the woods in the first episode. After finding Hikari, Takeru gains inexplicable new powers which allow him to transform into a powerful, yet primal being with incredible lethality, but has also been shown to be able to transform into something between his human and monster forms. This power is later explained to be a result of Extended Definition. Takeru eventually develops a love interest in Hikari, ultimately convincing Hikari to spare the world for their love. It is shown that he has some feelings for Mari, but only as a relative. He is obsessed with motorcycles and wanted to take Hikari on a journey throughout the country on one.
Hikari (ヒカリ)
Voiced by: Ayako Kawasumi (Japanese); Cynthia Martinez (English)
A mysterious girl who 'fell from the sky', Hikari fell in love with Takeru at first sight after being found in the first episode. She is very cheerful and thinks that almost everything is beautiful. While she can not remember anything before the day Takeru found her, it is later discovered her purpose is to destroy Earth. She is the goddess of darkness, death, and destruction. Hikari has split personalities, and her appearance changes depending on which one is dominant; her "good" personality is characterized by orange hair and green eyes, and her "evil" personality is characterized by pink hair and red eyes. By the series' end, she decides to destroy the earth, but Takeru stops her with his love for her. In the end of the anime, Hikari lives with Akari in the stars, though promises to return. Her name means "Light."
Ryou Ninomiya (二ノ宮リョウ, Ninomiya Ryō)
Voiced by: Fujiko Takimoto (Japanese); Quentin Haag (English)
Ryou Ninomiya is Takeru's best friend and is favored by many of the girls at school because of his gentle nature. He is consistently called "Ryou-sama" by Sakurako and Amika. He is the one who found Akari and throughout the series develops feelings for her. He too develops special powers, his being the ability to grant his wishes, shown by blue spirals on his hands.
Akari (アカリ)
Voiced by: Ai Shimizu (Japanese); Jessica Boone (English)
Akari is a girl that appears just as mysteriously as Hikari. Ryou finds her in the forest and makes her part of his family. She considers Hikari her older sister, and she grows very attached to Ryou and Kimi. Akari later reveals that she and Hikari are actually one being and that they were split into two during their landing. The part of Hikari's personality that does not want the earth destroyed is manifested in Akari. In the end of the anime, she and Hikari wander the stars with only each other. Her name means "Bright."

=== Supporting characters ===
Mari Nishino (西野マリ, Nishino Mari)
Voiced by: Asami Sanada (Japanese); Luci Christian (English)
Mari Nishino is Takeru's cousin, While she nags Takeru for various reasons, Mari harbors jealousy of Takeru and Hikari's relationship. Although she denies her feelings for him early in the series, Mari falls in love with Takeru. Throughout the series she is aggravated by the closeness of Hikari and Takeru, and distrusts Hikari, although is kind to her through the beginning of the series. Her jealousy of their relationship grows as her love for Takeru grows largely unrequited. Near the climax of the series, Mari admits her love to Takeru, attempting to make him not follow Hikari, but Takeru only smiles, thanks her, and goes to persuade Hikari to spare the world.
Jennifer Portman (ジェニファー・ポートマン, Jenifā Pōtoman)
Voiced by: Yumi Takada (Japanese); Shelley Calene-Black (English)
Jennifer Portman is an American super-scientist who came to Japan to study the "Extended Definition", a species' ability to prevent its own extinction, which usually manifests itself in said species transforming into a monstrous form that maximizes its combat potential, and gives it the instinct to attack or kill Hikari. She moves in with Takeru, Hikari, and Mari. She's rarely to be seen without some kind of alcohol and is somewhat of an exhibitionist. Although out of work she appears ditzy and idiotic, she is extremely intelligent at her work. Her personality is seen as a blend between that of Misato Katsuragi and Ritsuko Akagi from Neon Genesis Evangelion (another Gainax series).
Shinichi Asakura (浅倉晋一, Asakura Shin'ichi) and Daijirou Matsumura (松村大治郎, Matsumura Daijirō)
Shinichi Voiced by: Atsushi Kisaichi (Japanese); Robert Martinez (English)
Daijiro Voiced by: Hideki Ogihara (Japanese); Chris Patton (English)
Shinichi Asakura and Daijirou Matsumura are schoolmates of Takeru who seem to always be dreaming up some kind of perverted fantasy, especially once they met Hikari.
Sakurako Urushima (漆島桜子, Urushima Sakurako) and Amika Kurebayashi (紅林浴香, Kurebayashi Amika)
Sakurako Voiced by: Manabi Mizuno (Japanese); Lesley Tesh (English)
Amika Voiced by: Yumi Kikuchi (Japanese); Taylor Hannah (English)
Sakurako and Amika enjoy egging on the love triangle between Takeru, Mari and Hikari.
Itcho (西野一丁, Nishino Ichichō) and Sumie Nishino (西野澄江, Nishino Sumie)
Itcho Voiced by: Dai Matsumoto (Japanese); Bob Parke (English)
Sumie Voiced by: Tomoko Kotani (Japanese); Anne Armogida (English)
Itchō and Sumie Nishino are Mari's parents. They took in Takeru when his mother abandoned him at a young age. Currently, they run two business ventures: a delivery business and a boarding service.
Kimi Ninomiya (二ノ宮紀美, Ninomiya Kimi)
Voiced by: Emi Kobayashi (Japanese); Hilary Haag (English)
Kimi is Ryou's loud-mouthed younger sister who takes care of the housework when her brother is out. She was the only person living with Ryou until Akari came. She seems to be very protective of Ryou and, while she allowed Akari into their home, attempted to put a barrier between them and frequently got mad whenever they came into close contact.
Kuon (クオン)
Voiced by: Asami Sanada (Japanese); Greg Ayres (English)
Kuon is the little creature that takes care of Akari. He looks like a specter with two luminous eyes but no defined body shape, except by his clothing. He is capable of levitation and apparently has some sharp tentacles, as he is seen carrying a watermelon with them which he later uses to remove the rind from the watermelon. Towards the end of the series, Kuon and Ioneos enter hibernation mode and become a crystal. Kuon becomes a chip of the crystal which is probably why Kuon was small and Ioneos was big.
Ioneos (アイオニオス, Aioniosu)
Voiced by: Keiichi Noda (Japanese); Paul Oddo (English)
Ioneos is like Kuon's "older brother," as he and Kuon are created from the same type of magical crystal. However, Ioneos's appearance and size are much larger and sleeker than Kuon's because he is an entire crystal, save a small chipped fragment which Kuon is made from. He was sealed inside of one of the school's stone pillars until Hikari accidentally released him during a routine fire drill. The entire school was subsequently demolished after the blast following Ioneos's release. Jennifer nicknamed him "Oniita," (or "Neo" in the English dub) saying that his original name was too long. In the end, Ioneos enters hibernation mode along with Kuon and become crystals, Kuon being the little chip and Ioneos being the big crystal. Jennifer puts them on a necklace and wears the crystals.
Mayu Yoshida (吉田真由, Yoshida Mayu)
Voiced by: Mai Kadowaki (Japanese); Monica Rial (English)
Mayu is the class representative. She is short and full of self-doubt. In one episode, Mayu admits to Hikari that she sometimes hates school because everyone teases her, which makes Hikari turn into her "evil" self and destroy the school (brought on by Mayu's hate for school) although Mayu does not seem to remember it.

== Media ==
=== Anime ===
The anime was directed by Shouji Saeki at studios Gainax and Shaft. Saeki and Hiroyuki Yamaga served as the series composition writers, Takeshi Watanabe composed the music, and Kazuhiro Takamura (from Gainax) designed the characters and served as chief animation director. Two episodes were outsourced outside of Gainax and Shaft: episodes 5 and 10, which were produced at studio Nomad. (Note: Nomad credited in the ending to their respective episodes as Production Assistance (制作協力).)

==== Episodes ====
No.	Title	Directed by (Note: Information is taken from the ending credits of each episode.)	Written by	Storyboarded by	Original release date
1	"Dawn Is the Dividing Line Between Light and Darkness"; Transliteration: "Akatsuki wa Hikari to Yami no Wakare-me" (Japanese: 暁は光と闇のわかれめ)	Shouji Saeki	Tomoyasu Ookubo	Shouji Saeki	April 2, 2004
2	"You're My First"; Transliteration: "Anata ga Hajimete" (Japanese: あなたが初めて)	Shin Itagaki	Sumi Uetake	Shouji Saeki	April 9, 2004
3	"Two in the Shade of a Tree"; Transliteration: "Futari no Kokage" (Japanese: 二人の木陰)	Masahiko Ootsuka	Shouji Saeki	Atsushi Nishigori	April 16, 2004
4	"Life from Now On"; Transliteration: "Korekara no Jinsei" (Japanese: これからの人生)	Toshimasa Suzuki	Shouji Saeki	Toshimasa Suzuki	April 23, 2004
5	"School Days"; Transliteration: "Sukūru Deizu" (Japanese: スクール・デイズ)	Shigehito Takayanagi	Tomoyasu Ookubo	Katsuichi Nakayama	April 30, 2004
6	"Lingering by the Water's Edge"; Transliteration: "Mizube ni Tatazumi" (Japanese: 水辺にたたずみ)	Toshimasa Suzuki	Sumio Uetake	Takashi Yamazaki	May 7, 2004
7	"Prelude to a Kiss"; Transliteration: "Kisu e no Pureryūdo" (Japanese: キスへのプレリュード)	Shin Itagaki	Shin Itagaki	Shin Itagaki	May 14, 2004
8	"This Wonderful World"; Transliteration: "Kono Subarashi Kisekai" (Japanese: この素晴らしき世界)	Mitsuhiro Yoneda	Tomoyasu Ookubo	Mitsuhiro Yoneda	May 21, 2004
9	"Wish upon a Star"; Transliteration: "Hoshi ni Negai wo" (Japanese: 星に願いを)	Katsuichi Nakayama	Tatsuo Satou	Katsuichi Nakayama	May 28, 2004
10	"False Heart"; Transliteration: "Itsuwari no Kokoro" (Japanese: 偽りの心)	Ryou Miyata	Sumio Uetake	Ryou Miyata	June 4, 2004
11	"Flowing Along with Time"; Transliteration: "Toki no Sugiyuku Mama" (Japanese: 時の過ぎ行くまま)	Toshimasa Suzuki	Shouji Saeki	Toshimasa Suzuki	June 11, 2004
12	"My Heart's Song"; Transliteration: "Waga Kokoro no Uta" (Japanese: 我が心の歌)	Shouji Saeki	Shouji Saeki	Shouji Saeki	June 18, 2004

=== Music ===
Soundtrack composer: Tsuyoshi Watanabe

Opening song

- "Metamorphose" by Yoko Takahashi

Ending song

- "Natsuiro no Kakera" by Yoko Ishida (Episodes 1–11)
- "Kimi ni Aete" by Ayako Kawasumi & Ai Shimizu (Episode 12)
