= Ken Takeuchi =

Japanese voice actor

- 武内 健
- Born: February 20, 1978 (age 47); Tokyo, Japan
- Occupation: Voice actor

Ken Takeuchi (武内 健, Takeuchi Ken, born February 20, 1978) is a Japanese voice actor who works for Arts Vision.

Takeuchi learned voice acting at the Institute of Japan Narration Act. In 2000, he debuted as a main character in the video game Photogenic, and in 2003, he played one of the main characters, Ranmaru Miura, in Dear Boys (also known as Hoop Days). He is also known for his roles as main character Keita Suminoe in Kiss×Sis, and Lithuania in Hetalia: Axis Powers.

== Filmography ==
=== Anime ===
==== Television ====
2002

- Princess Tutu (2002), male student (ep 7)
- Haibane Renmei (2002), customer (at clothes shop, ep 8)
- Knight Hunters Eternity (2002) (ep 13)

2003

- Detective Loki (2003), crook B (ep 8)
- Mermaid Melody: Pichi Pichi Pitch (2003), Galeos (ep 55)
- Dear Boys (2003), Ranmaru Miura
- Da Capo (2003), male student 1 (ep 1)
- Green Green (2003), Yuusuke Takazaki
- Popotan (2003), young man (ep 5)
- Full Metal Panic? Fumoffu (2003), photo club member B (ep 11)
- Bobobo-bo Bo-bobo (2003), Tenbobo (eps 66–67)
- Chrono Crusade (2003), teen
- Stellvia (2003), Ian

2004

- Samurai Champloo (2004), bodyguard (ep 11), member (ep 18)
- Elfen Lied (2004), policeman C (ep 9), Satou (ep 3)
- ToHeart: Remember My Memories (2004) (ep 11)
- Major (2004), Oikawa (ep 27-)

2005

- Ichigo 100% (2005), schoolboy (eps 1–2)
- Loveless (2005), Kaidoh Kio
- Best Student Council (2005), Hitoshi Sato (ep 18), male student 1 (ep 10)
- Black Cat (2005), Kevin

2006

- Gakuen Heaven (2006), Kakeru Ozawa
- Kiba (2006), Bryan, Deucem (eps 40–46), Guzma, Jeva, Rebel D (ep 11), soldier (ep 2), young man 2 (ep 6)

2009

- Hetalia - Axis Powers (2009), Lithuania
- Hetalia World Series (2010), Lithuania

2010

- Kiss×sis (2010), Keita Suminoe

2013

- Brothers Conflict (2013), Louis Asahina

2014

- Haikyu!! (2014), Komaki

2016

- Sakamoto desu ga? (2016), Mario

==== Original video animations ====
- Green Green: Erolutions (2004), Yuusuke Takazaki
- Elfen Lied (2005), SAT member
- Kiss×sis (2008), Keita Suminoe

==== Film ====
- Garasu no Usagi (2005), Haruki Kawashima

=== Video games ===
- Brothers Conflict: Brilliant Blue, Louis Asahina
- Brothers Conflict: Passion Pink, Louis Asahina
- Etude Prologue, Nachi Katagiri
- Teikoku Sensenki, Kisharaku
- Radiata Stories

=== Drama CDs ===
- 3 Shake (2009), Okazaki
- Aiso Tsukashi (2011), Shuuya Kasuga
- Amai Kuchizuke (2002), Basketball Club Captain & Drama Club Director
- Chocolate no Youni (2008), Kyouichi Shizuka
- Hakuu Series 1: Hakuu (2008), Nachi Mizusawa
- Hakuu Series 2: Jiu (2009), Nachi Mizusawa
- Hakuu Series 3: Awayuki (2009), Nachi Mizusawa
- Hetalia: Axis Powers (2008–2009), Lithuania
- Kimi to Te wo Tsunaide (2007), Fuui Shindou
- Kiss×Sis, Keita Suminoe
- Loveless, Kio Kaido
- Love Neco (2007), Necoco
- Ogamiya Yokochou Tenmatsuki
- S (Esu) Series 2: Kamiato (2006), Mao Takanashi
- The Rose of Versailles II, Jeanne
- TV-kun no Kimochi (2009), (Souta Karasuma)
- Yume Miru Seiza (2008)
- Zenryousei Sakurabayashi Kan Gakuin ～Gothic～
- Hana no Mizo Shiru (2009), Misaki Shouta
