= Hideki Ogihara =

Japanese voice actor

- 荻原 秀樹
- Born: Tokyo, Japan
- Other name: Takezou Koike (小池竹蔵)
- Occupation: Voice actor
- Years active: 1996–present
- Spouse: Fujiko Takimoto (m. 2014)

Hideki Ogihara (荻原 秀樹, Ogihara Hideki) is a Japanese voice actor from Tokyo, Japan. He is affiliated with T's Factory. On February 2, 2014, he married fellow voice actor and Mahoromatic co-star Fujiko Takimoto.

== Filmography ==
=== Anime ===
List of voice performances in anime
Year	Title	Role	Notes
1997	Berserk	Soldier, messenger, mercenary	
1998	Ginga Hyōryū Vifam	Solder, Operator	
1998	Charge! Pappala Corps ja:突撃！パッパラ隊	Gill ギル	
2000	Gatekeepers	Boy	
2000	Gravitation	Maa-kun	
2001	Gyōten Ningen Batseelor	Mata Tabi Maru マタタビ丸	
2001–02	Mahoromatic series	Toshiya Hamaguchi	Also Something More Beautiful, and OVA in 2009
2001	Captain Tsubasa	Makoto Soda	2001 edition
2002	Weiß Kreuz Glühen	Kyo Aguri	
2003	Shadow Star	Kura	
2004	This Ugly Yet Beautiful World	Daijirou Matsumura	
2004	Gakuen Alice	Make a girlfriend 幽体離脱君	
2005	Izumo: Takeki Tsurugi no Senki	Yagi Takeru	
2005	Play Ball	Konno	
2005	Shuffle!	Itsuki Midoriba	Also Memories in 2007
2005–09	Major	Yoshitaka Yamane	Series 2-5
2006	Lemon Angel Project	Ryouta Kogure	
2006	Soul Link	Ryota Aizawa	
2006	Lovely Idol	Tomohiro Fujisawa	
2007	The Story of Saiunkoku	Yangming 楊修	season 2
2008	Kimi ga Aruji de Shitsuji ga Ore de	Unbeliever 未有信者	
2010	Togainu no Chi	Tremor 猛	
2011	I Don't Like You at All, Big Brother!!	Shūji Takanashi	
2011	We Without Wings	Kazuma Morisato	
2012	Waiting in the Summer	Tetsurō Ishigaki	also OVA in 2014
2014	Dai-Shogun - Great Revolution	Hyakusuke	
	Crayon Shin-chan	Clerk	

=== Film ===
List of voice performances in film
Year	Title	Role	Notes	Source
1997	Noiseman Sound Insect	Tobio		

=== Video games ===
List of voice performances in video games
Year	Title	Role	Notes	Source
1998	Fighting Layer	Jigjid Bartol	Arcade	
1999	Magical Drop F	Chariot, Tower	PS1 / PS2	
2003	Phantom of Inferno	Narrator	PS2	
2003	Mahoromatic games	Toshiya Hamaguchi 浜口俊也		
2004–2009	Shuffle! games	Itsuki Midoriba	PC Adult, also Tick! Tack!	
2004	Izumo 2 games	Yagi Takeru	PC Adult	
2004–10	Soul Link	Ryota Aizawa	Also Extension and Ultimate	

=== Drama CD ===
List of voice performances in Drama CD
Year	Title	Role	Notes	Source
2002	Wild Arms Advanced 3rd	Ruckman リュックマン		
2004–05	Shuffle!	Itsuki Midoriba	Character and drama CDs	

=== Dubbing ===
- Beautiful Love, Wonderful Life, Do Jin-woo (Oh Min-suk)
