= Unlight =

2010 video game

- Developer: Techway
- Artist: miya
- Platforms: Yahoo! Mobage, Facebook, Naver, Niconico, Mixi, myGAMECITY
- Release: October 12, 2010: Yahoo! Mobage; JP: October 12, 2010; Facebook; WW: May 28, 2015 (English); niconico; JP: February 6, 2013; mixi; JP: January 16, 2014; my GAMECITY; JP: March 6, 2015; DMM Games; JP: March 18, 2024; Steam; WW: December 7, 2024
- Genre: Card battle

Unlight (アンライト～Unlight～) was a free-to-play collectible card battle and role-playing browser game developed by the Japanese company Techway. With multiple language versions including Japanese, Chinese (both traditional and simplified), Korean, French, Thai, and English, the game boasts a playership of two million across all platforms (Facebook, Niconico, Naver, Yahoo! Mobage, Mixi, and Koei Tecmo's myGAMECITY). It is the top engrossing Facebook game in Asia. In 2014, the game won gold in the foreign browser game category for the 2014 Game Star award at the Taipei Game Show. Set in a "medieval gothic" world, the player assumes the role of an automaton given life by a "Saint of Flame" to recover the memories of warriors who have died in another world.

The international English version on Facebook, itself a merger of the French, Thai, and Asian (English) versions, closed on June 30, 2016. After releasing the mobile spinoff Unlight: SchizoChronicle, Techway announced the suspension of the original browser game - the Chinese versions were closed on September 7, 2017 while the Japanese version followed suit on October 18 the same year. The spinoff Unlight: SchizoChronicle closed a year later. A re-release of the game called Unlight: Revive became available on DMM Games since March 18, 2024, and on Steam since December 7 of the same year.

== Gameplay ==
=== Battles ===
The game involves up to 3 character (or monster) cards duelling another party of 1~3 characters or monsters. At the beginning of each turn (the "Draw phase"), each player draws a certain number of event cards with points on them, which determines the character's actions this turn. After drawing comes the "Move phase", where players play their purple "movement" cards to determine the distance between the character and the opponent. The player with the higher move points gets to attack first. In the "Attack phase", the player can use red "sword" cards to attack at close range or green "gun" cards to attack at long range; playing the appropriate cards according to the distance would accumulate attack points, which are matched against the opponent's defence points. The party being attacked would be in the "Defence phase", where the player can use blue "shield" cards to accumulate defence points. The attack and defence points represent how many dies are rolled, and only the dies with the emblem facing up are counted towards the actual attack/defence points. Damage is calculated by subtracting the actual attack points by the defence points. The attacker and defender then switch roles, and the player who attacked first now enter the "Defence phase" while the other player enter the "Attack phase". After the two players have exchanged blows, the turn ends. In all phases the character can activate their individual skills by playing the specific combination of cards for those skills. The skills' effects vary, and most need the yellow "special" cards to activate. There are also miscellaneous cards which allow the player to heal HP, recover from status effects, draw more cards, etc.

A player wins the battle if the opposing player's characters all end up with 0 hit points, or 18 turns have elapsed and the player's sum of the characters' hit points is higher than those of the opponent.

=== The deck ===
Players can customize their decks, which are composed of four types of cards: character, equipment, monster, and event. Cards can be obtained as drops in all game modes, as random draws in the "Darkroom", or bought in the "Shop" with in-game currency.

- Character cards

Character cards represent the characters who fight in the battles. A character card has five levels, and each increase in level gives a stat boost and/or unlocks a skill. There are also the "rare" version of the character card for each level, which are stronger and comes with all skills already unlocked at the first level (R1), and subsequent levels unlock the "Ex" version of the character's skills. The "rare" version also contains a part of the character's story, for which there are five for each character. There are also "Rebirth" character cards, representing the character coming back to life, which are powerful versions with a new skillset. Some characters also have "Ep" cards, which are like "rare" cards but with additional stories.

A character can level up by collecting a certain amount of the cards at the current level. A normal card can also be made into a "rare" card by combining 10 of the normal cards at the current level, a "rare" card at the previous level (if applicable), and additional crafting materials. "Rebirth" cards cannot be crafted, while "Ep" cards can be crafted like "rare" cards, but requiring more uncommon materials.

- Equipment cards

Equipment cards can augment a character's stats if equipped. Some equipment have special effects like extending the turn numbers for status ailments. Generic equipment can be upgraded with materials, and a fully upgraded equipment may turn into a character-specific equipment.

- Monster cards

Monster cards are like character cards, but they cannot be the leader of the deck nor can they level up, despite usually having three levels. They can be morphed into coins, which serve as in-game currency or ingredients for crafting materials. Some monster cards from events contain stories.

- Event cards

Event cards are the cards that the characters use in battle. Each character can carry up to 6 event cards to a maximum of 18 in total, from which 1 can be drawn during the "Draw phase" at the beginning of each turn, in addition to the cards drawn on the battlefield deck.

=== Game modes ===
All game modes use AP (action points), which replenish at 1 point per 30 minutes.

- Quest: The story mode. Each area requires the player to clear dungeons a certain number of times before the boss of the area is unlocked. Upon defeating the boss, the next area is unlocked. Dungeons, including the boss dungeons, have to be discovered using AP and setting an amount of time to search. The longer the search, the more likely that a rare dungeon containing valuables or bosses shows up.
- Duel: The player versus player mode. A player can choose the opponent from the lobby or be automatically matched to another player of comparable card strength. A simple game of craps happens after each duel where the player may win rewards. Generally, the longer the winning streak, the better the prize; but if the player guessed wrong then they are left with nothing.
- Raid: A game mode where many players can take on a monster with very high HP. Players can determine how many turns they want to spend fighting the monster (with 1 turn corresponding to 1 AP). Players are ranked in each raid instance by how much they contributed to defeat the monster, and high ranking players in each raid instance can get valuable prizes.

== Development and reception ==
The art of Unlight is gothic in the style of American comic books, drawn by the illustrator Miya. Unlight was developed by a 5 employee-company at first, and first launched on Yahoo Mobage in 2010. With the release of multiple language versions, its popularity, especially in Taiwan, grew to a point where their servers had to be upgraded every week in September 2011. The popularity of Unlight in Taiwan is attributed to the game's unique setting, good gameplay, female-friendly elements, and a successful promotional campaign targeted at gamers.

In 2014, Techway gave Glitter, a Korean studio, the rights to develop Unlight Trinity, an Android game featuring characters from Unlight. In September 2015, Techway released an Unlight-themed match-3 puzzle game Puzlight on the Android platform. On July 23, 2017, Techway released a Dominion-inspired smartphone game Unlight: SchizoChronicle for the Android platform, with an iOS version released some time later. These spinoffs were all shut down by August 24, 2018.

In October 2018, the intellectual property rights to the game were transferred to CPA Co. Ltd., a company started by Unlight's illustrator Miya, who released the source code of the browser game under the CC-BY-ND license on July 30, 2019.
