= Bunjūrō Nakayama =

Japanese author (born 1964)

Bunjūrō Nakayama (中山 文十郎, Nakayama Bunjūrō; born June 15, 1964) is a Japanese author, best known for the creation of Mahoromatic.

== Works ==
- Ushio and Tora (Novel edition) (1993–1995)
- Dōkyūsei (Novel edition) (1994–1997)
- Yukina no Negai (1999)
- Mahoromatic (Story) (1999–2004)
- Otone no Naisho (Story) (2004)
- Shina Dark (Story) (2006–2009)
- Shiage ni Tate Ari (Story) (2007–2011)
