= George Wood (actor) =

English actor, singer, songwriter and composer

- Born: George Wood; 16 October 1981 (age 44); Deal, England
- Occupations: Actor; singer; songwriter; composer
- Notable work: Ollie in the TV series I Dream
- Height: 5 ft 9 in (175 cm)

George Wood (born 16 October 1981 in Deal) is an English actor, singer, songwriter and composer, best known for his role of Ollie in the TV series I Dream.

== Biography ==
Wood was born on 16 October 1981 in Deal. Wood speaks French (proficient) and Italian (conversational). He has also advanced football and contemporary dance skills.

== Television ==
- I Dream: Ollie (leading role, 2004)
- The Dotted Line: Mike (leading role, 2003)
- Anythings Possible: Christopher Dean (leading role, 1997)
- Disney Club: Main Presenter (1996–1997)
- Road Hog: Main Presenter (1996–1997)

== Filmography ==
- Leonardo's Shadow: Giacomo (leading role, 2006)
- Annie: A Royal Adventure!: Michael Webb (supporting role, 1995)

== Theater ==
=== Writer ===
- Cinderella: Prince (Richmond Theatre, Richmond, 2007–2008)

=== Actor ===
- Deep Blue Sea: Philip Welch (Vaudeville Theatre, 2008)
- Cinderella: Prince (Milton Keynes Theatre, Milton Keynes, 2006–2007)
- The Wizard of Oz: Tinman (Marlowe Theatre, Canterbury, 2006)
- Little Women: Laurie (TheatreWorks, 2005–2006)
- Cinderella: Prince (Churchill Theatre, Bromley, 2005–2006)
- The Mystery Plays: Jesus (Canterbury Cathedral, 2004)
- Snow White and the Seven Dwarfs: Prince (Marlowe Theatre, Canterbury, 2003–2004)
- Sound of Music: Rolf (Aberystwyth Arts Centre, 2002)
- Oliver!: Dipper (London Palladium, 1996)
- Peter Pan (Tour): John Darling (Manchester Palace, Cork Opera House, His Majestys Aberdeen, Belfast Opera House, 1995)

== Music ==
=== Writer ===
- CD Demo (8 tracks, one featured in I Dream)

=== Singer ===
- Say It's Alright (solo single, 2005)
- I Dream Cast Album (3 solo tracks, 2004)
- Promotional tour and performances on Top of the Pops, Blue Peter, Smile & Children in Need

== Commercials ==
- Clearasil (2002)
- Gran Dorado (1998)
- Frutini-Del Monte (1996)

== Radio ==
- First Steps in Drama (BBC, 1995)
