= Kiss×sis =

Japanese manga series by Bow Ditama and its adaptations

- Cover art of the first volume of the manga
- Genre: Romantic comedy
- Manga
- Written by: Bow Ditama
- Published by: Kodansha
- Imprint: Young Magazine KC
- Magazine: Bessatsu Young Magazine; (December 19, 2005 – August 11, 2008); Weekly Young Magazine; (September 29, 2008 – December 7, 2009); Monthly Young Magazine (December 9, 2009 – September 21, 2021)
- Original run: December 19, 2005 – September 21, 2021
- Volumes: 25
- Original video animation
- Directed by: Munenori Nawa
- Produced by: Tomoko Kawasaki
- Written by: Katsumi Hasegawa
- Music by: Mizuki Ueki
- Studio: Feel
- Licensed by: NA: Discotek Media
- Released: December 22, 2008 – April 6, 2015
- Runtime: 24 minutes
- Episodes: 12
- Anime television series
- Directed by: Munenori Nawa
- Produced by: Masayuki Haryu; Takahiro Yamanaka; Tomoko Kawasaki
- Written by: Katsumi Hasegawa
- Music by: Mizuki Ueki
- Studio: Feel
- Licensed by: NA: Discotek Media
- Original network: AT-X
- Original run: April 4, 2010 – June 21, 2010
- Episodes: 12
- icon

Kiss×sis (stylized as kiss×sis; pronounced "kiss sis") is a Japanese manga series written and illustrated by Bow Ditama. It began serialization in Kodansha's Bessatsu Young Magazine in December 2005. It was then moved and serialized in Weekly Young Magazine from 2008 to 2009, and was serialized in Monthly Young Magazine from 2009 to 2021. Kodansha collected its chapters in twenty-five tankōbon volumes. It was adapted into an original video animation series, released from December 2008 to April 2015. A 12-episode anime television series by Feel aired from April to June 2010 on AT-X.

== Plot ==
Keita Suminoe is a third-year Japanese middle school student living with his father, stepmother, and older twin stepsisters, Ako and Riko. Since the remarriage of their parents at childhood, the siblings have always been affectionately close and supportive of one another. Nowadays the trio see their opposites in a noticeably less platonic fashion; Ako and Riko frequently flirt and lust after Keita while, much to his stress, he fights the urge to give in to them.

== Characters ==
Keita Suminoe (住之江 圭太, Suminoe Keita)
Voiced by: Ken Takeuchi
Keita Suminoe is a 15-year-old third-year middle school student who is part of a blended family after his father remarried some years previously (Keita's mother having died when he was young). He was raised with two stepsisters, Ako and Riko, who are a year older than he is and have developed more-than-filial feelings for him. As a result, now that they are high school age, Keita finds it increasingly difficult to retain his modest, dignified morals; especially when exposed to his parents' shockingly permissive attitudes. A track and field club member, Keita is more athletic than he is academic; however he strives to be, and eventually is, accepted to the same high school as his stepsisters. There, he is a first-year high school student in the same class as Miharu, with Yuzuki Kiryu as their homeroom teacher.
Ako Suminoe (住之江 あこ, Suminoe Ako)
Voiced by: Ayana Taketatsu
Bright and cheery, Ako Suminoe is a 16-year-old first-year high school student who is one of two stepsisters to Keita and twin sister to Riko. The more intellectual of the pair, Ako is educated, maternal, responsible, the manager of the Student Council General Affairs, skilled at cooking and homemaking, and endeavors to maintain a prim and proper demeanor. In spite of this imposing façade however, she is outwardly emotional, childish, whiny, reluctant, easily embarrassed and perverse; her most well-known open secret. Having grown up with Keita since toddlerhood, Ako is altruistic and, of course, in love with him. As such she is not afraid of abusing her authority on the student council to either make a pass at Keita, or cover up embarrassing occurrences.
Riko Suminoe (住之江 りこ, Suminoe Riko)
Voiced by: Yuiko Tatsumi
Riko Suminoe is a 16-year-old first-year high school student and second stepsister to Keita. Though less academically accomplished than her twin, Riko is cunning, insightful, crafty, an active member of the Disciplinary Committee, and boldly open about her personal life and sexuality. Unlike Ako, she is very poor at cooking and it always turns out to be inedible and when she feeds it to Keita, he spits the food in her face in disgust, much to her anguish. Surprisingly, she cannot bring herself to kiss Keita in front of others. In contrast to Ako, she is highly skilled in physical activities and sometimes helps out with various sports clubs who need another person temporarily for training. She is known however to be soft-spoken, clumsy, temperamental, and gets drunk more easily than her sister and Keita. Riko is most recognized for wearing an adhesive bandage on her left cheek, ostensibly to cover up a scar that from when Keita threw a toy at her when they were children. There may not even be a scar, but Riko never lets anyone see what is under the bandage. It is hinted that Riko keeps wearing a bandage as a visible reminder for Keita to keep thinking about her. Riko is ardently fond of her stepbrother and forever fighting with Ako over his affections.
Miharu Mikuni (三国 美春, Mikuni Miharu)
Voiced by: Yoriko Nagata (anime), Tomoko Nakamura (OAD 10–11)
Miharu Mikuni is a third-year middle school student who enters into the same high school class as Keita. A fairly quiet and unassuming character, she comes to his attention when she delivers Keita his entrance exam results; having passed, he joyfully befriends her. Unlike the other girls, Miharu is comparatively meek, easily intimidated and predisposed to anxiety; as such, she suffers from enuresis (which becomes a running gag in the series). Her relationship with Keita is mostly platonic; what feelings she does have for him are generally overshadowed by the not-too-greatly over-imagined images she has of him and his stepsisters. She sometimes fantasizes about Keita making non-consensual advances against her, but initially does not seem have any romantic interest in him. This situation may not last as she seems to be (glacially) slowly developing a romantic interest in him after he helps her out of various (and sometimes extremely embarrassing) situations (that are usually but unintentionally caused by either the twins or Mikazuki) and keeps his mouth shut about them. Her fondness for Keita grew noticeably when he 'tripped' during a race (actually hurting his leg a little) so that she could finish first and experience what it felt like to win a sporting event. Of the entire cast, Miharu is the only bespectacled female character. Later on, her feelings for Keita grow and she becomes more aggressive in pursuing him, much to the chagrin of Ako and Riko.
Mikazuki Kiryū (桐生 三日月, Kiryū Mikazuki)
Voiced by: Asuka Ōgame
Peppy and outgoing, Mikazuki Kiryu is a second-year middle school student and the younger sister of Yuzuki Kiryu. She enters her third year of middle school when Keita starts his first year in high school. She is much more mature for her age than her sister is, and tends to keep a mostly level head when her sister is losing hers. An underclassman to the rest of the cast, Mikazuki looks up to everyone, especially Keita, who she has a crush on. However, she seems to be just as interested in amusing herself by watching the antics and reactions of others as in actually winning him over. She considers her sister, Yuzuki, and Keita to be two of a kind, well suited for each other, and enjoys watching them try to act like a normal teacher and student. She becomes one of the few characters outside of Ako and Riko to discover that Yuzuki and Keita are secretly in a relationship when she bursts in on the two making out in Yuzuki's apartment. She seems to develop some feelings for Keita herself after the group trip to the beach. She also shares a certain genetic condition with her sister that is revealed when the girls take a bath during the beach trip.
Yūzuki Kiryū (桐生 夕月, Kiryū Yūzuki)
Voiced by: Asami Imai
Yuzuki Kiryu is a recently hired 24-year-old homeroom and Japanese History teacher at the fictional Gakushū Senior High, and the older sister of Mikazuki. Prior to working at the school, she had a job at a clothing store, which is where Keita first encountered her. While she constantly berates herself whenever she makes mistakes, she is a caring teacher who can lay down the law when necessary but tends to get herself and others in trouble when she acts impulsively over perceived misconduct without finding out the full story. Single, unmarried, independent, and noticeably eccentric, she is initially disgusted with Keita and his relationship with Ako and Riko, to the point of unduly crusading against it. Ultimately, and despite her age difference, she develops conflicting feelings for Keita herself. An obsessive fan of anime, manga and cosplay, Yuzuki's apartment contains a large collection of merchandise, books, games and posters; a particularly favored theme of hers being samurai. She is so obsessed that her parents forced her to either give up her hobbies permanently or get a place of her own (which she did). She often has to eat cheap ramen as she spends most of her money on so much paraphernalia to the point that it clutters up her apartment and she cannot invite anyone inside without them discovering her hobby. Much to her humiliation, Yuzuki is a virgin. In the manga, Yuzuki and Keita eventually become closer, admit their mutual feelings for one another, and start dating in secret, a fact only known by Ako and Riko (but eventually discovered by Mikazuki and suspected by other characters), who despite being angry at her for getting involved with her own student, respect his decision, stating that in the end he will return to their side. Keita's parents also know about their relationship and accepted it. Later on, she breaks up with Keita after escaping to Hokkaido as she did not want to be his girlfriend anymore.
Toda Edogawa (江戸川 戸田, Edogawa Toda)
Voiced by: Kiyotaka Furushima
He is Keita's best friend from middle school. He is jealous of Keita's relationship with his sisters and other girls. He is also a pervert, and hopelessly infatuated with the Suminoe sisters.
Chiba Okubo (大久保 千葉, Okubo Chiba)
Voiced by: Daisuke Matsuo
Another friend of Keita's from school.

== Media ==
=== Manga ===
Kiss×sis is written and illustrated by Bow Ditama. Ditama launched a one-shot in Kodansha's Weekly Young Magazine in 2004. Kiss×sis was then serialized in Kodansha's now-defunct bimonthly Bessatsu Young Magazine from December 19, 2005, to August 11, 2008. It was then transferred to Weekly Young Magazine, being serialized from September 29, 2008, to December 7, 2009. It was transferred to Monthly Young Magazine (rebranded title of Bessatsu Young Magazine) on December 9, 2009. It was on hiatus between the August 2013 and January 2014 issues. The manga finished after 17 years of publication on September 21, 2021. Kodansha collected its chapters in twenty-five tankōbon volumes, released under their KC Deluxe imprint, from September 6, 2007, to November 18, 2021. The manga is also licensed in Taiwan by Sharp Point Press.

=== Anime ===
It was announced in June 2008 that an animated adaption of Kiss×sis would be produced by Feel. On December 22 of that year, the first OVA was released, bundled with the third volume of the manga, directed by Munenori Nawa. Subsequent releases were packaged with subsequent volumes of the manga. The 12th and last episode was released on April 6, 2015. The opening and closing themes for the OVA include "Our Honey Boy" (ふたりのハニーボーイ, Futari no Hanibōi) by Ayana Taketatsu and Yuiko Tatsumi and "Starry Sky Story" (星空物語, Hoshizora Monogatari) by Nana Takahashi, respectively.

A 12-episode anime television series adaptation of the manga aired on AT-X from April 5 to June 21, 2010. A censored pre-release of the first episode aired online on March 28, 2010. The opening theme is "Balance Kiss" (バランスKISS, Baransu Kisu) performed by Ayana Taketatsu and Yuiko Tatsumi, and the ending theme is "Our Steady Boy" by Yui Ogura and Kaori Ishihara. The ending theme for episode 12 is "Futari" (ふたり, The Two of Us) by Yui Ogura and Kaori Ishihara. The first DVD volume was released on June 23, 2010. Unlike the TV airings of the other episodes, certain scenes of episodes nine through twelve were censored. A DVD/Blu-ray Disc edition has subsequently been released without the censorship.
