= Annie: A Royal Adventure! =

1995 television film directed by Ian Toynton

- Genre: Family; Musical
- Written by: Trish Soodik
- Directed by: Ian Toynton
- Starring: Ashley Johnson; Joan Collins; George Hearn
- Music by: David Michael Frank
- Country of origin: United States
- Original language: English

Production
- Executive producers: Wendy Dytman; Ruth Slawson
- Production location: London
- Cinematography: Alan Hume
- Editor: James Galloway
- Running time: 94 minutes
- Production companies: Rastar Television; TriStar Television

Original release
- Network: ABC
- Release: November 18, 1995

Annie: A Royal Adventure! (also known as Annie 2 or Annie 2: A Royal Adventure!) is a 1995 American comedy film and the sequel to the 1982 theatrical film Annie. The film was produced by Rastar Television and TriStar Television and was released as a television film on ABC in the United States on November 18, 1995. The film has no songs apart from a reprise of "Tomorrow" sung at the end of the film, immediately after Daddy Warbucks is knighted.

None of the cast members from the previous film appear in this sequel. Annie, Daddy Warbucks, Molly, Punjab, Asp, Sandy, and Miss Hannigan are the only characters from the original to appear in this film. Grace, Rooster, Lilly and Mrs. Pugh are not in the sequel. Many of the original cast had either moved on to other projects or were too old for the sequel.

== Plot ==
A year after the 1982 film, twelve year old Annie Warbucks, Oliver "Daddy" Warbucks, their dog Sandy, Annie's new friend Hannah, an eccentric scientist, and Annie's old friend Molly (who is still an orphan but gets adopted by the Webb family in the end), travel to Britain, where Warbucks is to be knighted by His Majesty the King. However, the kids and their new English friend Michael Webb get mixed up in the scheme of an evil noblewoman known as Lady Edwina Hogbottom to blow up Buckingham Palace while all the heirs to the throne are present for Daddy Warbucks' knighting.

== Cast ==
- Ashley Johnson as Annie Warbucks
- Joan Collins as Lady Edwina Hogbottom
- George Hearn as Oliver "Daddy" Warbucks
- Ian McDiarmid as Dr. Eli Eon
- Emily Ann Lloyd as Hannah
- Camilla Belle as Molly
- Crispin Bonham-Carter as Rupert Hogbottom
- Perry Benson as Mean Murphy Knuckles
- Antony Zaki as Punjab
- David Tse as Asp
- Jayne Ashbourne as Charity
- Carol Cleveland as Miss Hannigan
- George Wood as Michael Webb
- Buffy Davis as Mrs. Webb
- Ian Redford as David Webb
- Timothy Bateson as Derwood
- Deborah MacLaren as Madame Charlotte
- Ann Morrish as Mrs. Fowler
- David King as Winston Churchill
- Tim Seely as George VI of the United Kingdom
- Roger Bizley as Captain Thomas
- Mary Kay Bergman as Miss Hannigan / British children / New York children / additional voices (voice)
- Sam Mancuso as Newspaper Seller
- Sam Stockman as James
- Edward Highmore as Hotel Clerk

== Reception ==
=== Critical response ===
The film received a mixed reception from critics.

=== Ratings ===
The film was seen by 5.2 million viewers during its television premiere, making it the 88th most-watch program of the week in the United States during the week of its premiere.

== Home media ==
The film was released on VHS on November 14, 1995, and Region 1 and 2 DVD in 2004 and contained no special features, only a subtitle selection.
