= List of Kanokon episodes =

The first volume of the Kanokon anime released by Media Factory on June 25, 2008.

Kanokon is a 2008 anime based on the light novels written by Katsumi Nishino and illustrated by Koin, published by Media Factory. The series centers on Kouta Oyamada, a young boy from the countryside enrolled in his freshman year at Kunpo High School. He soon becomes the object of affection by Chizuru Minamoto, a second-year student and a fox spirit, and becomes the subject of her perverted actions. He later encounters Nozomu Ezomori, a wolf spirit who also has a romantic interest in Kouta. The series revolves around the love triangle between Kouta, Chizuru, and Nozomu, and the various yōkai who inhabit the school as well as the outside world.

Produced by Xebec, the anime is directed by Atsushi Otsuki, series composition by Masashi Suzuki, music by Tsuyoshi Ito, and characters by Akio Takami. The anime aired on AT-X between April 5, and June 28, 2008, and six DVD volumes were released by Media Factory between June 25 and November 21, 2008. A box set was later released on January 22, 2010. The anime is licensed in North America by Media Blasters under the title Kanokon: The Girl Who Cried Fox, and released the first volume on May 25, 2010. Media Blasters later announced that they will not release volumes 2 and 3 of the series, and instead released a box set on March 22, 2011.

A two-part OVA, Kanokon: Manatsu no Daishanikusai (かのこん ～真夏の大謝肉祭～), was announced, and aired on AT-X between October 4, 2009, and October 11, 2009. Both episodes were released on DVD between November 25 and December 22, 2009, by Media Factory. The OVA is licensed in North America by Media Blasters, who released the series on June 21, 2011.

The anime's opening theme is "Phosphor" sung by Ui Miyazaki, and the ending theme is "Koi no Honō" (恋の炎; "Flame of Love") sung by Yui Sakakibara. The opening theme for the OVA is "Sunlight of the Sordino" (木漏れ日のソルディーノ, Komorebi no Sorudino) by Yui Sakakibara, and the ending theme is "Lupinus: Winds of Happiness" (ルピナス～幸せの風～, Rupinasu ~Shiwaze no Kaze~) by Ui Miyazaki.

== Episode list ==
=== Kanokon (2008) ===
No.	Title	Original release date
1	"Doing It for the First Time?"; Transliteration: "Hajimete Shichau?" (Japanese: 初めてしちゃう?)	April 5, 2008
As Kouta Oyamada is walking to school, he meets up with Chizuru Minamoto, who hugs him close which embarrasses him due to her breasts pressing against him and the fact that others can see what is going on. Akane Asahina, the class representative of Kouta's class, attempts to interfere, though cannot fight Chizuru's persistence. At school, Chizuru hands Kouta a love letter, asking him to come to the music room. This reminds him of earlier in the school year where a similar event took place. At the music room, Chizuru confesses her love to Kouta, and in the process accidentally revealed that she is actually a kitsune. Chizuru's younger brother Tayura soon interferes and tries to tell them that their relationship is dangerous. Chizuru possesses Kouta for a little while and Chizuru conjures up a huge flame which blasts Tayura outside, leaving a gaping hole in the school building.
2	"Are We Becoming One?"; Transliteration: "Hitotsu ni Nacchau?" (Japanese: ひとつになっちゃう?)	April 12, 2008
On his way home from school, Kouta runs into a girl his age that he intuitively senses is a spirit like Chizuru. The following day, the same girl appears in Kouta's class and is all over him, much to the annoyance of Chizuru. She is introduced as a transfer student named Nozomu Ezomori from Hokkaido, though it is soon revealed to Chizuru and Kouta that she is from a powerful wolf clan. Nozomu continues to get in the way of Chizuru's plans to get close to Kouta due to her own such desires for Kouta.
3	"Eat Deliciously?"; Transliteration: "Oishiku Tabechau?" (Japanese: 美味しく食べちゃう?)	April 19, 2008
Kouta is the prize in a battlefield fought with food between Chizuru and Nozomu, but neither of them can cook well and Kouta is the one suffering as he is forced to eat terrible food experiments conducted by the two girls. Chizuru and Kouta later get attacked by Omi Kiriyama, a sickle weasel, but Kouta takes the hit for Chizuru and is knocked unconscious to Kiriyama's shock. Feeling guilty, Kiriyama tries to help Kouta by having Mio Osakabe, a frog spirit, make toad oil (even though she is a frog spirit), and Chizuru cannot help but get more intimate with Kouta by rubbing the oil in with her body, but Nozomu joins in and Kouta panics again. Back at school, a fight breaks out between Chizuru and Nozomu that leaves Kouta shouting at Chizuru and then she cries and runs off. Kouta soon follows, finding out that Chizuru was faking it and that she just wanted some alone time with Kouta in a very playful way.
4	"Can't Take It Off?"; Transliteration: "Nugenaku Nacchatta?" (Japanese: 脱げなくなっちゃった?)	April 26, 2008
In an attempt to win Kouta and defeat her enemy Nozomu, Chizuru breaks into a forbidden supply room and steals a cursed bunny girl suit. Her problems start when she cannot take off the suit and is forced to go to school in it with everyone staring at Chizuru and calling her names behind her back. It is later revealed that the suit contains the soul of a spider demon that feeds off the life of the wearer. The suit then changes all the female students' clothes into cliché cosplay outfits and tries to kill off Chizuru but she and Kouta combine, freeing Chizuru of the evil suit and destroying it once and for all.
5	"It Doesn't Work Anymore?"; Transliteration: "Dame ni Nacchau?" (Japanese: ダメになっちゃう?)	May 3, 2008
Saku Ezomori, Nozomu's brother, puts a bracelet on Kouta's wrist that inflicts high amounts of pain if he becomes sexually aroused, and Chizuru worries that if she tries her normal flirting behavior she could eventually kill him. Chizuru holds back her feelings for a couple of days but with intense self-restraint (to the point she starts having withdrawal symptoms). Meanwhile, Tayura and Kiriyama try to negotiate with Nozomu's brother to take off the bracelet with violence, but all goes wrong when they discover that he is really powerful; Chizuru later joins the fight but is defeated. At the school, Nozomu hears her brother's victory howl and tells Kouta that Chizuru is in danger. At the scene of the fight, Kouta and Chizuru combine to make quick work of Nozomu's brother.
6	"Can I Ask This of You?"; Transliteration: "Onegai Shichau?" (Japanese: お願いしちゃう?)	May 10, 2008
Japanese New Year has come, and while Kouta at first is enjoying a quiet stay at home alone, Chizuru soon comes and tries to heat things up by distracting him while he is writing and taking off her kimono to reveal a school swimsuit. They eventually play a love dice game where the players get to do perverted things to each other. Nozomu shows up at the end and gets in Chizuru's way, and Kouta suggests they go to take part in hatsumōde. At the shrine, they meet up with Chizuru's brother and other friends from school. At the end of the day at the shrine, they all go back to Kouta's house.
7	"Won't You Warm Me Up?"; Transliteration: "Atatamete Agechau?" (Japanese: あたためてあげちゃう?)	May 17, 2008
Yukihana, a yuki-onna from Chizuru's family, tests the bond between Chizuru and Kouta by creating a powerful snowstorm only around the school. As the students try to stay warm, Kouta, Chizuru, Nozomu and Tayura try to search for Yukihana. Tayura gets taken away by a band of snowmen, and the others run away into a nearby classroom where Chizuru and Nozomu use their bodies to warm up Kouta. Yukihana finally appears, and as Chizuru and Kouta are trying to run away, Yukihana stops them. Chizuru and Kouta combine, showing how strong their bond is, and thus Yukihana stops the snowstorm, and informs them that Chizuru's mother wants her to bring Kouta back to her hometown.
8	"Should We Enter Together?"; Transliteration: "Issho ni Haicchau?" (Japanese: 一緒に入っちゃう?)	May 24, 2008
Kouta, Chizuru, Nozomu, Tayura and a few classmates are visiting a hot spring resort run by Chizuru's mother Tamamo, who is revealed to be the fox deity Tamamo-no-Mae. She puts the bond between Kouta and Chizuru to the test by means of a special beverage which makes two people fall in love with each other. Unfortunately, this happens between Kouta and Nozomu while Chizuru is powerless to do anything about it, leaving her devastated. Kouta eventually snaps out of it and manages to make it up to Chizuru. When the bunch is leaving to go back to the city, Tamamo entrusts Chizuru to Kouta.
9	"Can You Feel It?"; Transliteration: "Kanjisugichau?" (Japanese: 感じすぎちゃう?)	May 31, 2008
A little girl named Minori Mitama and her spirit bodyguard Nue hire the twin spirit hunters Ai and Ren to seal Chizuru's powers. They are given a drug to achieve this, only to find out that this makes Chizuru's breasts disappear. In shock about her loss, Chizuru desperately tries to find a cure to undo this and is assisted by Kouta, Nozomu, and Tayura. Meanwhile, Minori is making ominous preparations in order to take Kouta from Chizuru.
10	"Shall I Show Restraint?"; Transliteration: "Enryo Shichau?" (Japanese: 遠慮しちゃう?)	June 7, 2008
Chizuru and Kouta treat Ai and Ren to a meal. Seeing as the two are poor, this has magnanimous effects on them and they regret the whole potion situation. In turn, they ask to be taken off of the mission and are electrocuted repeatedly by Nue. Minori summons demons to attack the school, and during this time a sleeping sand is released on all the humans. Nue enters and takes down Nozomu, and chases Kouta and Chizuru down. When they are cornered, Kouta refuses to leave Chizuru to her death and discovers his fox powers. Kouta possesses Chizuru and turns into a black-furred five-tailed fox. He defeats Nue and Minori, who makes an oath to make Kouta her own one day. Chizuru's breasts, and thus her spiritual powers, are restored.
11	"I'm Getting Wet Already?"; Transliteration: "Mō Nurechau?" (Japanese: もう濡れちゃう?)	June 14, 2008
Chizuru, Kouta, Tayura, Nozomu and their friends go to a beach that is only known to spirits. After some trouble changing (no changing rooms and Nozomu having a rather unusual swimsuit) and an attempt at sunbathing, they discover a beach house nearby named Tama no Ya, which is run by none other than Tamamo and Yukihana. Tamamo once again tries to win Kouta's affections, much to Chizuru's frustration. Back at the beach, the group enjoys themselves with a barbecue and fireworks, but Chizuru is bothered because she cannot be alone with Kouta. Akane gets into trouble when she drifts too far offshore and is rescued by Tayura, making her warm up a little to him. Chizuru asks Kouta to take a walk with her on the beach under the stars, and eventually asks him how he feels about her.
12	"Can We Finally Do It?"; Transliteration: "Tsui ni Shichau?" (Japanese: ついにしちゃう?)	June 21, 2008
Chizuru wants Kouta to say he loves her, but he is very hesitant. Chizuru tries several methods to make him say it, but gets frustrated. Tayura asks Akane out on a date and she accepts, but says she wants to go to an art gallery instead of usual popular date spots like an amusement park. Kouta admits that he loves Chizuru in the end when he spots her crying in the rain on the bridge where they first met. Kouta and Chizuru become lovers, and Nozomu barges in saying that she accepts their relationship, and that she in turn will be Kouta's mistress, a thing which to Kouta's dismay Chizuru accepts.

=== DVD specials ===
A series of short special episodes titled "Eizou Tokuten" were packaged with the DVD release of the TV series before 2009. There were a total of thirteen, spread across 6 volumes. Each had two episodes except for the 6th which had 3. Some of them are music videos, others are unseen scenes, the thirteenth is a remix of the events of the last 5 minutes of the 12th episode.

=== Kanokon: Manatsu no Daishanikusai (2009) ===
No.	Title	Original release date
1	"Kanokon: The Midsummer Carnival - Part 1"; Transliteration: "Kanokon: ~Manatsu no Daishanikusai - Jō~" (Japanese: かのこん ～真夏の大謝肉祭・上～)	October 4, 2009
OVA Part 1
2	"Kanokon: The Midsummer Carnival - Part 2"; Transliteration: "Kanokon: ~Manatsu no Daishanikusai - Ka~" (Japanese: かのこん ～真夏の大謝肉祭・下～)	October 11, 2009
OVA Part 2
