= Nyan Koi! =

Japanese manga and anime series

- Cover of the first volume

にゃんこい!
- Genre: Harem, romance
- Manga
- Written by: Sato Fujiwara
- Published by: Flex Comix
- Magazine: FlexComix Blood (2007–2012); Meteor Comics (2012–2015)
- Original run: August 10, 2007 – January 7, 2015 (on hiatus)
- Volumes: 6
- Anime television series
- Directed by: Keiichiro Kawaguchi
- Produced by: Junichiro Tanaka; Shinichi Nakamura; Jiyū Ōgi; Naoko Okada; Tomohiro Fujita
- Written by: Shinichi Inotsume
- Music by: Shigenobu Ōkawa; Manabu Miwa
- Studio: AIC
- Licensed by: NA: Sentai Filmworks; UK: MVM Films
- Original network: TBS, MBS, CBC, BS-TBS
- Original run: October 1, 2009 – December 17, 2009
- Episodes: 12
- icon

Nyan Koi! (にゃんこい！; lit. 'Meow Love!') is a Japanese manga series written and illustrated by Sato Fujiwara. It started serialization on Flex Comix's web manga FlexComix Blood on August 10, 2007. An anime adaptation premiered on October 1, 2009, in Japan. The series has been licensed by Sentai Filmworks and released in North America with English subtitles on December 14, 2010, and dubbed in English on December 31, 2013, by Seraphim Digital.

== Plot ==
Junpei Kōsaka is a second-year high school student who is allergic to cats, and because of this he hates the sight of them. As luck would have it, his high school crush, Kaede Mizuno, absolutely adores cats. One day, while walking home from school, Junpei kicks an empty can and unfortunately breaks the local neko-jizō-sama (guardian deity of cats). He finds he can now understand what cats are saying, including his family's own ill-tempered cat, Nyamsus. However, to atone for the broken statue, he must now grant 100 wishes to cats, or he will turn into a cat himself and die from his own allergy.

== Characters ==
=== Human characters ===
Junpei Kōsaka (高坂 潤平, Kōsaka Junpei)
Voiced by: Shintarō Asanuma (Japanese); Connor Leach (English)
Junpei is the protagonist of Nyan Koi! who has a chronic allergy and, thereby, resentment of cats. Ironically, everyone around him seems to love cats, including his mother and sister (which does not help his predicament). To complicate matters, he accidentally destroys the statue of a cat deity, and to atone for it, he must make use of his new-found ability of communicating with cats to fulfill the requests of one hundred cats. If he does not atone properly, he will be transformed into a cat, and die due to his allergy. Furthermore, should anyone find out about the curse, not only will the curse get stronger and enact faster, but the person who found out will become more unlucky and accident prone, such seen when Akari told Junpei that she knew he was cursed and almost fell down the temple stair. His love interest is Kaede Mizuno, but is starting to become aware of the feelings of the other girls around him.
Kaede Mizuno (水野 楓, Mizuno Kaede)
Voiced by: Yuka Iguchi (Japanese); Lesley Pedersen (English)
Kaede is Junpei Kōsaka's classmate and crush who is initially oblivious of his feelings for her. She is described as athletic, smart and cute. Despite loving cats, her family owns four dogs, and cats tend to avoid her as she not only carries their smell, but gets overenthusiastic in handling them. This is mainly due to her only having experience with the big dogs her family owns and not realizing that cats are much different creatures. She tends to be airheaded, react to things naively and misunderstand people. Kaede meets Junpei when she falls on him from a tree trying to rescue a kitten that later climbs down itself. As a member of the track and field team, Kaede can run faster and longer than the average person, especially Junpei. She later develops feelings for Kōsaka.
Kanako Sumiyoshi (住吉 加奈子, Sumiyoshi Kanako)
Voiced by: Ryōko Shiraishi (Japanese); Maggie Flecknoe (English)
Kanako is Junpei Kōsaka's classmate and childhood friend who has a fondness for cats and Junpei.^{[ch. 3]} She is introduced in the series wearing manba make-up, which is a result of Kanako misunderstanding Junpei's intention of showing her Nyamsus doll to a girl.^{[ch. 4, 26]} During Tokiwa High School's cultural festival, her makeup is washed off. Later, Junpei passes on the caba cat Kumaneko's thanks for taking care of him and Kanako reconciles with Junpei when he reveals that he still has Kanako's doll. Kanako stops wearing her make-up and she becomes popular with Tokiwa's male students.^{[ch. 4]} She has a well-endowed body, and is not afraid to flaunt it, but often gets unwanted attention and is groped by Nagi Ichinose.^{[ch. 6]} Kanako is very forceful and often gets Junpei to purchase her food and merchandise at his own expense. Despite being romantically attracted to Junpei since childhood, her brash, quick-tempered personality frequently gets in the way of communicating her feelings for him. Kanako has a younger brother named Toru, who is dating Junpei's younger sister.
Nagi Ichinose (一ノ瀬 凪, Ichinose Nagi)
Voiced by: Yū Kobayashi (Japanese); Kara Greenberg (English)
Nagi Ichinose is Kaede's senior on the track team and heir of a powerful yakuza family from Kyoto. Like Kaede, she can run far and fast easily without getting winded. Despite being a girl, she started assuming a more masculine behavior after she was rejected by her first love, who mistakenly assumed she was a guy because of her boyish appearance and personality. Even Junpei thought she was a boy at first when she confronted him for approaching Kaede (who she feels needs protecting). However, after Junpei comforts her, she falls in love with him and resorts to extreme actions, such as attempting to transfer into his class despite being a year older, just to be at his side. She suffers from a fear of lightning, the fear stemming from the fact that she witnessed her grandfather being struck by lightning on several occasions. She punctuates her sudden appearances by sexually harassing Kanako (often involving groping her breasts). She has a rare condition where she gets drunk from drinking soft drinks, which seems to give her romantic-like, lesbian-like, affectionate feelings towards other girls including Kaede and Kanako. She is called "Ichinose-senpai" by Kaede. She has a male longhair cat named Josephine, who speaks in Kansai-ben accent and wears a small cape. Her cat is "married" to her older brother's female cat.
Kotone Kirishima (桐島 琴音, Kirishima Kotone)
Voiced by: Haruka Tomatsu (Japanese); Emily Neves (English)
Kotone is the elder of the Kirishima twins. She, along with her sister, are the daughters of the Buddhist monk in the temple behind the cat statue Junpei that broke. Despite her gentle and sweet outward demeanor, she is interested in Junpei mainly because of his misfortunes and can be considered sadistic, delusional, and an obsessive stalker. In the anime, she is shown to have had this sort of behavior towards a teacher, even at a young age. She exhibits yandere tendencies as she becomes jealous if another girl gets too close to Junpei. She is hinted to have feelings for Kōsaka. She is aware of Kaede's feelings for Junpei. Like her sister, she is aware of Junpei's curse and tries to find ways to help or encourage him to help more cats. She tends to bring the family's female black cat, Noir, who has a bit of a prima-donna attitude, wherever she goes. Some of this attitude is due to how Kotone's father practically ignored her and gave her common cat food while lavishing attention and gourmet cat food on Tama.
Akari Kirishima (桐島 朱莉, Kirishima Akari)
Voiced by: Haruka Tomatsu (Japanese); Cynthia Martinez (English)
Akari is Kotone's younger twin sister. She, along with her sister, know that Junpei is cursed. They do not become cursed themselves as they have innate anti-magic abilities, but only for self-protection. She is a tsundere, and has the ability to sense the supernatural. She is extremely possessive of Kotone. In the anime, Akari is revealed to have been asocial as a child, thus causing her present awkwardness in dealing with people. The reason for this is because of her strong spiritual affinity, and she subconsciously avoided the other children. Despite her difficulties dealing with strangers, she seems to have no problem interacting with Junpei (though mostly due to her mistaken perception that he's becoming too close to Kotone). In contrast to her sister, she is aware of Kanako's feelings towards Junpei. Slowly, she too begins to harbor feelings for Junpei but tries to conceal them.
Keizo Kirishima (桐島 啓造, Kirishima Keizō)
Voiced by: Jūrōta Kosugi (Japanese); Andrew Love (English)
Keizo is a Buddhist monk at the temple in which the cat deity dwells. He is the father of Kotone and Akari. Despite being a monk, he often dons disguises to visit cabaret clubs. Keizo found Tama shivering outside in the cold and took him in, but began to spoil him once he discovered that Tama was an extremely rare male calico cat; this angered Noir, the family's other pet cat.
Chizuru Mochizuki (望月 千鶴, Mochizuki Chizuru)
Voiced by: Rina Satō (Japanese); Monica Rial (English)
Chizuru is a third-year college student working as a mail carrier for Japan Post Service when she is not in class. She has a bad sense of direction and frequently ends up getting lost.^{[ch. 15]} She is somewhat perverse and enjoys teasing Junpei. She seems to take a liking to Junpei after he helped her deliver letters in a district she got lost in.^{[ch. 15]} Junpei eventually takes up a part-time job at the post office during the winter to help raise money to repair the cat statue and they deliver the mail together.
Suzu Kōsaka (高坂 スズ, Kōsaka Shizue)
Voiced by: Eri Nakao (Japanese); Meg McDonald (English)
Suzu is Junpei's younger sister and is in her first year of middle school. She pokes fun at Junpei when he is with girls and gossips with her mother about the girls Junpei is with. She is a great cat lover and loves Nyamsus very much. It is shown that she is dating Sumiyoshi's younger brother and is not embarrassed about the relationship.
Shizue Kōsaka (高坂 静江, Kōsaka Shizue)
Voiced by: Makiko Nabei (Japanese); Shelley Calene-Black (English)
Shizue is Junpei and Suzu's mother. Her husband left the family many years ago for unknown reasons, causing her to raise her kids by herself; she also a quite supporting mother, the more girls linked together with Junpei, the more happier she and Suzu are.

=== Feline characters ===
Nyamsus (ニャムサス, Nyamusasu)
Voiced by: Atsuko Tanaka (Japanese); Marcy Bannor (English)
A large, fat cat owned by Junpei's family, and the one who brings to him the requests of cats in need of his help. She is well known and most cats around Junpei's neighborhood see her as an older sister figure. She reveals (to herself) that she is very grateful for Junpei since he gave her a home by begging his mother to take her in despite his allergies. Nyamsus greatly cares for Junpei but shows this subtly like when she claims ownership of the living room so as to prevent Junpei from sleeping in it and so catching a cold. It is revealed that Nyamsus is the kitten that Kaede had left in a very nice comfortable box with a sign saying she needed a home due to not being able to keep a cat with all the dogs at her home.
Tama (タマ)
Voiced by: Jun Fukuyama (Japanese); Jay Hickman (English)
A small cat owned by the Buddhist monk Keizo Kirishima, in charge of the temple whose statue was broken by Junpei, and an acquaintance of Nyamsus, who also brings requests to him. He goes about the neighborhood and tells the other cats around about Junpei, which is part of the reason why the local cats know so much about him. He is an extremely rare male calico cat.
Noir (ノワール, Nowāru)
Voiced by: Yukari Fukui (Japanese); Elizabeth Bunch (English)
A black cat owned by the Kirishima twins. She received less attention once Tama was adopted into the family, and became jealous of his near-royal treatment as a rare breed. Still, the two share a fondness for one another, but easily become argumentative. The reason for her conflict with Tama is suspected to be his adoration of Nyamsus, and is heavily hinted that she is jealous of Nyamsus.
Josephine (ジョセフィン, Josefin)
Voiced by: Kōji Yusa (Japanese); Samuel Roman (English)
Josephine is a cat owned by Nagi. He is dressed up in an elegant manner, and speaks in a Kansai dialect. He wishes for Nagi to shed her masculine behavior, and thus asks Junpei to help her fall in love once again. He has a wife who lives in Kyoto.
Masa (マサ)
Voiced by: Nobuyuki Kobushi (Japanese); Samuel Roman (English)
Komasa's father. He cheated his pregnant wife in Kyoto with another cat, that's why he had been staying with Josephine at Tokiwa town. After he heard that Komasa was born, Masa asked for Junpei's help to bring him back to Kyoto.
Komasa (コマサ)
Voiced by: Sachi Matsumoto
Masa's son. He was born while Masa was staying in Tokiwa at Josephine's house; He was lost at the theater village and saved by Junpei, Kaede and Sumiyoshi. Both Masa & Komasa were happily reunited after that.
Cindy (シンディ)
Voiced by: Rina Satō
Cindy is the wife of Josephine. She at the Ichinose clan's main house in Kyoto.
Chatora (シャトー)
Voiced by: Kazuya Tatekabe (Japanese); Mark X. Laskowski (English)
A fat yellow cat who lives next door to Junpei. His master sees a commercial about obese cats on TV and decides to put Chatora on a diet. Chatara refuses, at first, to accept this change in his food from human food down to dry cat food. He asks Junpei for help to get rid of this idea in his master about his diet but Junpei is able to put some sense in Chatora that his master cares about his health; He finally accepts his master's wishes in going along with this diet but comes to Junpei's house once in a while to get more food.
Michi (道)
Voiced by: Shintaro Ohata (Japanese); Rob Mungle (English)
Kumaneko (クマネコ)
Voiced by: Yui Sakakibara

== Episode list ==
No.	Title	Original release date
1	"The Ugly Cat & the Cursed High Schooler" "Busaiku na Neko to Norowareshi Kōkōsei" (ブサイクな猫と呪われし高校生)	October 1, 2009
Teenager Junpei Kōsaka attempts to avoid contact with cats due to his allergy of them. However, one day, he accidentally damages the statue of a cat deity. According to the Buddhist monk Keizo Kirishima, one would be cursed with the ability to talk to cats as a consequence, tasked of attending one hundred requests from them, with the risk of be transformed into a cat himself if he fails to do so. The first request he receives, from Nyamsus and Tama, is to help the stray cats in the local park who have been tormented by a stranger leaving them devastated. At the mall, he runs into his crush Kaede Mizuno, and while on the way home, the tormentor later turns out to be Kaede, who has an extreme fondness for cats to the point of smothering them.
2	"That guy...A servant?" "Sono Otoko Geboku?" (その男 下僕？)	October 8, 2009
Junpei must help a caba cat to give his thanks to a girl who helped him. However, she is actually Kanako Sumiyoshi, a childhood acquaintance of his who wears manba makeup. During the annual high school cultural festival, she is determined to get him to do her bidding. He hesitates to give his thanks, since she has changed after the time she saw him give her cat doll to another girl when they were kids. However, a student inadvertently spills a bucket of water on Kanako, wiping off her makeup, and after she loses her temper and chases him, Kaede finds her to dry her off. After the cultural festival, Junpei gives his thanks to Kanako, and they reconcile. The caba cat later moves in with Junpei until he can find another home.
3	"Your name is..." "Kimi no Na wa" (キミの名は)	October 15, 2009
Junpei meets Chizuru Mochizuki, a postwoman who has no sense of direction, and decides to help her. While roaming the city with her, he also helps the cats with their various requests. However, hanging around with her ends up putting him on a series of misunderstandings with people he knows, much to his despair. Junpei reminisces to when he first met Kaede on the first day of school, remembering how she tried to rescue a cat up on a tree but accidentally slipped and landed on him. After she helped him up, he fell in love with her ever since then.
4	"Beautiful People" "Utsukushii Hito" (美しい人)	October 22, 2009
Junpei receives a letter from Nagi Ichinose, an upperclassman of his, who challenges him to a duel, but since he ignored this letter for three days, Nagi passes out due to stress. During a downpour, Junpei, Kaede, and Kanako take an unconscious Nagi to her house, which so happens to be a mansion of a yakuza. Jii, Nagi's grandfather, treats the three to his home. While there, Junpei is requested from Josephine, a cat owned by Nagi, to make Nagi fall in love. While Kaede and Kanako are taking a bath, Junpei is sent to Nagi's bedroom, where he is surprised to figure out that Nagi is a girl who is in love with Kaede and she also fears lightning due to her past encounter. She was also devastated when her first crush turned her down for her boyish appearance. After calming her down, he departs from the mansion, with Josephine satisfied by the fact that Nagi will now act more feminine.
5	"Times Square (Time for a Love Square)" "Taimuzu Sukuwea (Shikaku Kankei no Koku)" (四角関係の刻（タイムズ・スクウェア）)	October 29, 2009
Junpei is given a pair of tickets to an amusement park from Nagi, who wants to settle things with him. Kaede and Kanako end up coming along, much to Nagi's disappointment. While Kanako takes Junpei to a roller coaster ride, Nagi tells Kaede something that has been making her blush in front of Junpei. In a haunted house and then on the Ferris wheel, Junpei sees this as the perfect chance to get closer to Kaede. However, their brief moments are ruined when Nagi captures a picture of them and Kanako attacks Junpei out of jealousy. Soon enough, Kaede begins to develop feelings for Junpei, concerned of who he might have an interest in. After school as the sun is about to set, Kaede goes off to search for Junpei, but when she finds him, she secretly witnesses him at the Buddhist temple in front of a girl, who is aware of his curse.
6	"Milk and Bitters and Sugar and Spice" "Miruku ando Bitā ando Shugā ando Supaisu" (ミルク＆ビター＆シュガー＆スパイス)	November 5, 2009
The next day at the Buddhist temple, Junpei meets Kotone Kirishima and Akari Kirishima, twins with opposite personalities, both knowing about his curse due to their ability to sense the supernatural. They later decided to help on his ordeal. Tama and Noir, the cat owned by the twins, have been in rivalry with each other for a long time. This is because Tama used to be pampered and spoiled after being adopted into the temple because of his rare breed. As Junpei follows Tama and Noir around the neighborhood, he runs into Kaede, who is walking her pack of dogs. Although Tama and Noir argue, they eventually settle their differences. However, Junpei inadvertently causes Kaede the wrong impression when he could not hear her over the cats, making her cry and leave. He later apologizes to her for the misunderstanding.
7	"Wait Until Dark" "Kuraku Naru made Matte" (暗くなるまで待って)	November 12, 2009
Junpei sets for a school trip to Kyoto with his classmates, but he barely has time to enjoy the trip when word about him spread among the local cats who flood him with requests. As Junpei, Kaede, and Kanako later spend the day together, they soon stumble upon the fact that Nagi, whose family is situated in Kyoto, is there to attend an annual meeting. This meeting is in fact an arrangement to have Nagi choose a husband, a decision which she would always decline.
8	"The Passionate Private Running Coach" "Honō no Kojin Kyōju Rannā" (炎の個人教授ランナー)	November 19, 2009
Junpei is tasked to help a cat named Michi to get in shape in order to be able to catch sparrows to win the favor of his beloved. However, he is interrupted by Nagi, who wants him to join her track and field club with Kaede. When Junpei starts to neglect his promise with Michi, the latter decides to enact revenge by putting him in a very embarrassing situation. Junpei was keeping hold of Kaede's handkerchief to return it to her the following day, but instead he pulls out from his bag her underwear that had been missing from her locker the day before. After Michi apologizes for his actions, Junpei trains him to become much stronger than ever, being able to be with his beloved. Junpei tells Kaede about the mix-up and returns the handkerchief back to her.
9	"Girls in the Water" "Gāruzu in za Wōtā" (ガールズ・イン・ザ・ウォーター)	November 26, 2009
The gang sets for a leisure time at the swimming pool before final exams. Junpei get a nosebleed after trying to catch Kaede in the pool when she was knocked over by Kanako and Nagi fighting. He later asks Kanako to help him get a cat to climb over the wall outside before returning to the pool. The next day, Junpei catches cold and misses class, so Kanako visits to give him the study guide handouts and take care of him. To make matters more complicated, Junpei meets Chatora, an overweight cat in need of a diet, but he is upset by the fact that this cat rejects such advice at first, making him feel lightheaded. As Kanako puts Junpei to rest, she struggles with her true feelings for him, abruptly leaving before he wakes up. The final exam takes place the following day.
10	"As it Happened One Night" "Aru Yoru no Dekigoto" (ある夜の出来事)	December 3, 2009
Everyone except Kanako passed their exam, so she needs to do a report on local history to pass as well. Junpei has Kotone and Akari to show his friends around the neighborhood to gather such information. However, his friends joke around with a maneki-neko figurine, which urges Kotone and Akari to stop them, due to a superstition of being cursed, and purify the figurine through a chant. At night, Kotone and Akari end up counting on Junpei's unexpected help to deal with the spirit of the maneki-neko figurine who threatens to kill them. With their combined and struggling effort, they eventually manage to destroy the spirit.
11	"Friends" "Furenzu" (フレンズ)	December 10, 2009
As the second semester comes to a close, everyone prepares as Christmas approaches. Kanako stumbles upon Junpei, who is taking a part-time job as a postman, inviting him to go with her to the movie theater. Before going there, they spent some quality time together in the mall. Kanako enjoys her time with him, recalling how great her friendship with him was in the past. The next day, Kanako, who worked part-time at a concession stand, gives Kaede a present. When she goes to the park, she overhears Junpei talking about a curse while he rescues a kitten from a tree to bring down for a cat.
12	"Does Heaven Await Me?" "Tengoku wa Matte Kureru?" (天国は待ってくれる？)	December 17, 2009
Junpei suddenly begins to turn into a cat, having Kotone and Akari help sneak him out of the post office unnoticed. He feels that Kaede is suspicious of his secret, so he must find a way to dissuade her before being stricken with the full force of his curse. He comes up with a plan to fake being cursed by the maneki-neko figurine, having Kotone and Akari purifying it afterwards. However, Nagi accidentally takes off his hat which reveals his cat ears, causing him to run away to the park. At this point he fully transforms in a cat, and Kaede then finds him there, not knowing it is him. As the local cats in the area gather around her, Kaede realizes how Junpei cared for the cats, believing he was never cursed. This seemingly reverses the curse which returns Junpei back to a human but he finds out that it had just abated. Junpei must continue to do good deeds for cats as the new year begins.

== Theme songs ==
Opening Theme:

"Nyanderful!" (にゃんだふる！) by Yui Sakakibara

Ending Theme:

"Strawberry: Amaku Setsunai Namida" (Strawberry～甘く切ない涙～) by Asami Imai

== Reception ==
Theron Martin from Anime News Network gave the English sub of the anime a C+ rating. In his review, he says that the anime does not stand out compared to other harem series. He goes on to say though that it tries to go with "some unusual twists". Chris Beveridge from The Fandom Post gave the anime a B rating. He calls the humor "cute", and that the ending builds up to something nice despite the manga not being finished.
