= Prism Heart =

2000 video game

- PRISM HEART
- Prism Heart logo

プリズム・ハート (Purizumu Hāto)
- Genre: Eroge
- Video game
- Developer: Pajamas Soft (Windows); KID (DC)
- Genre: Eroge, Visual novel, S-RPG
- Platform: Windows, Dreamcast
- Released: CD October 6, 2000; DVD January 25, 2008; DC November 29, 2001
- Video game

Prism Box
- Developer: Pajamas Soft
- Genre: Eroge, Visual novel, Minigame
- Platform: Windows
- Released: CD April 27, 2001

PRISM HEART (プリズム・ハート, Purizumu Hāto) is a Japanese erotic video game developed by Pajamas Soft and was first released on October 6, 2000, and a DVD edition for Windows was released on January 25, 2008. The game was ported to the Dreamcast on November 29, 2001, with the adult content removed by KID. A fan disc entitled Prism Box went on sale on April 27, 2001.

The sequel, Prism Ark, came out on August 25, 2006. Some characters also made an appearance on the Prism Ark anime.

== Characters ==
Meister (マイステル, Maisuteru)
Meister is the main protagonist.
Princea gave a pocket watch to him in their childhood. He comes from his hometown for the purpose of being a knight. At first, his swordplay grade is bad, but he improves his skill in his training.
Princea (プリンセア, Purinsea)
Meister is Princea's childhood friend, but she forgot him until a certain event. She has a younger brother, but he died in a little while after she and Meister parted in their childhood.
Komet (コメート, Komēto)
Komet is a maidservant at a dining hall Fushatei. She seems to have a bad sense of balance, and she always breaks plate in opening. She becomes a maidservant of Meister and Princea.
Kamina (カミナ, Kamina)
Kamina is a shrine maiden come from Wa-no-kuni. She entered into the country for the purpose of a secret command.
Maple (メイプル, Meipuru)
Maple, nicknamed Mel, is Meister's sister-in-law. She is loved by a rural knight. She is seriously ill.
Ina (イーナ, Īna)
Ina came from Yū-no-kuni. She seems to like a bomb.
Ange (アンジェ, Anje)
Ange works a church. She is famous for a certain channel.
Echo (エコー, Ekō)
Echo, who is the master of Fushatei, always smile however she is angry. She is a relation of Princea.
Ahnya (アーニャ, Ā'nya)
Ahnya is a female of half beast tribes.
Lise (リーズ, Rīzu)
Lise, is a blunderer and a crybaby, trains herself with the aim of becoming a knight. She appears in DC version.
Freyja (フレイヤ, Fureiya)
Freyja is a minstrel come to capital Freeden. She appears in DC version.

== See also ==
- Prism Ark
