= Yui Sakakibara =

Japanese voice actress, dancer and singer

Yui Sakakibara (Japanese: 榊原ゆい, Hepburn: Sakakibara Yui; born October 13) is a Japanese voice actress, choreographer, dancer and singer from Hyōgo Prefecture. She appeared on Kōhaku Uta Gassen as background dancer behind Ami Suzuki in 1999 and 2000. She used the name Mayo Hinano (雛野 真代(まよ), Hinano Mayo) and others in her previous roles. She is also credited as FES from the band "Phantasm" (ファンタズム) in the Science Adventure visual novel series, which is a stage name of her character Ayase Kishimoto from Chaos;Head.

== Filmography ==
=== Anime ===
- Happiness! (2006), Haruhi Kamisaka
- Otome wa Boku ni Koishiteru (2006), Hisako Kajiura
- Super Robot Wars Original Generation: Divine Wars (2006), Leona Garstein
- Prism Ark (2007), Priecia
- Chaos;Head (2008), Ayase Kishimoto
- H_{2}O: Footprints in the Sand (2008), Hamaji Yakumo
- Nyan Koi! (2009), Kumaneko
- Super Robot Wars Original Generation: The Inspector (2010), Leona Garstein
- Koi to Senkyo to Chocolate (2012), Mieru Ariake
- Seikoku no Dragonar (2014), Navi

=== Original video animation ===
- Papillon Rose (2003), Sister Pchela
- Touhou Project Side Story: Hoshi no Kioku (2007), Kaguya Houraisan
- Harukoi Otome (2008), Umi Hayasaka
- Yotsunoha (2008), Nono Nekomiya
- Mayo elle Otokonoko (2010), Umezaemon Matsukaze

=== Web Anime ===
- Saishū Shiken Kujira (2007), Niina Mikage

=== Console games ===
- St. Luminous Mission High School (2000), Yuka Tajima
- Super Robot Wars Alpha (2000), Leona Garstein
- Nukumori no Naka de: in the warmth (2001) Rina Shinbashi
- Super Robot Wars Alpha for Dreamcast (2001), Leona Garstein
- Chocolate♪Kiss (2002), Natsuki Tachibana
- Jockey's Road (2002), Hikaru Kamiya
- Konohana 2: Todokanai Requiem (2002), Mayumi Shiina, Yuko Oomi and Masami Kitayama
- Konohana 3: Itsuwari no Kage no Mukō ni (2003), Mayumi Shiina, Yuko Oomi, Masami Kitayama
- Fu-un Shinsengumi (2004), Ikumatsu
- Tokyo Majin Gakuen Gehouchou Keppuuroku (2004), Fureiya
- Fu-un Bakumatsu-den (2005), Ikumatsu
- Konohana 4: Yami o Harau Inori (2006), Mayumi Shiina, Yuko Oomi
- Kūron Yōma Gakuenki re:charge (2006), Itsuha Hibiki, Mayuko
- Mutsuboshi☆Kirari: Hoshifuru Miyako (2006), Hokuto, Araki Miyako
- Happiness! De:Luxe (2007), Haruhi Kamisaka
- Nitro Royale (2007), Natsumi Aihara
- Ojousama Kumikyoku -SweetConcert- (2007), Nanase Iwamoto
- Saishū Shiken Kujira Alive (2007), Niina Mikage
- Super Robot Wars OG: Original Generations (2007), Leona Garstein
- Super Robot Wars OG Gaiden (2007), Leona Garstein
- H_{2}O + (2008), Hamaji Yakumo
- Kanokon Esuii (2008), Shirane Kamura
- Prism Ark -Awake- (2008), Priecia
- The Amazon Road (2008), Johnny
- Yotsunoha: A Journey of Sincerity (2008), Nono Nekomiya
- Yggdra Union (2008), Kylier, Monica
- Chaos;Head Noah (2009), Ayase Kishimoto
- Pia Carrot e Yokoso!! G.P.: Gakuen Princess (2009), Hina Satō
- Pia Carrot e Yokoso!! G.P.: Gakuen Princess Portable (2009), Hina Satō
- Solfège: Sweet harmony (2009), Kagura Fujimiya
- Time Leap (2009), Ayumu
- 77: beyond the Milky Way (2010), Kuu
- Chaos;Head Love Chu Chu! (2010), Ayase Kishimoto
- Game Book DS: Aquarian Age Perpetual Period (2010), Ai Amane
- Record of Agarest War 2 (2010), Figline
- Sakura Sakura: Haru Urara (2010), Kurumi Tachibana
- Tenshinranman Happy Go Lucky!! (2010), Kotaro Asagi
- Otome wa Boku ni Koishiteru: Futari no Elder Portable (2011), Utano Sasou
- Stella Glow (2015), Sakuya

=== PC game ===
- Album no Naka no Hohoemi (1999), Yuzuko Sugadaira
- Heart de Network (2000), Mari Tsudanuma, Mūchan, Marine
- Sukidayo! (2000), Rina Shimbashi
- Memories Zero: Aoi Hikari no Yakusoku (2001), Yuumi Futaba
- Gakuen Counsellor (2002), Akiko Oodate
- "Hello, world." (2002), Natsumi Aibara
- Mayonaka wa Ware no Mono (2002), May
- Motto Muriyari! (2002), Moemi Asagi
- Sī Sī Syndrome (2002), Badrinath Silva
- Ane mo ne (2003), Futaba Shingūji
- Blaze of Destiny (2003), Lena Raputohōn
- Kakoi: Zetsubō no Shojo Kangokutō (2003), Kaede Kurata, Reika
- Oshikake Harem (2003), Excel Bouquet
- Sefure☆Syndrome (2003), Badrinard Silva
- to... (2003), Miho Ogasawara
- Chijoku Hitozuma Jogakuin (2004), Kaoru Mitone
- Kao no nai Tsuki: Suzuna Nikki (limited edition for fan club) (2004), Suzuna Kuraki
- Mutsuboshi Kirari (2004), Hokuto, Araki Miyako
- Oshikake Harem Hard Party (2004), Excel Bouquet
- Puni Puni Handmade (2004), Pochiko, Bochiko
- Saishū Shiken Kujira ~Departures~ (2004), Niina Mikage
- Akanaeru Sekai no Owari ni (2005), Chifuyu Oumi
- Gift (2005), Kirino Konosaka
- Gunjō no Sora o koete: Glas Auszeichnung (2005), Wakana Mizuki
- Hajimete no Otetsudai (2005), Yuuki Momono
- Happiness! (2005), Haruhi Kamisaka
- Bra-ban! -The bonds of melody- (2006), Tae Nakanoshima
- Gift: Nijiiro Stories (2006), Kirino Konosaka
- H_{2}O: Footprints in the Sand (2006), Hamaji Yakumo
- Happiness! Re:Lucks (2006), Haruhi Kamisaka
- Harukoi Otome: Otome no Sono de Gokigen'yō (2006), Umi Hayasaka
- Himesama Ririshiku! (2006), Atirene
- Koiotome (2006), Misora Yamato
- Osananajimi tono Kurashikata (2006), Nono Nekomiya
- Otaku☆Masshigura (2006), Yoshitsuki Fukushima
- Potto -Rondo for Dears- (2006), Kimika Ogata
- Prism Ark (2006), Priecia
- Spitan: Spirits Expedition -in the Phantasmagoria- (2006), Zena Clousy
- Yotsunoha (2006), Nono Nekomiya
- Ah! Ojousama (2007), Kaori Shihou
- Alpeggio: Kimiiro no Melody (2007), Chisato Kitami
- Chu×Chu Idol -The idol is a Vampire?- (2007), Chuchu Astram, Chiyu Nakauchi, Chua Churam
- Chu×Chu Paradise (2007), Chuchu Astram, Chiyu Nakauchi, Chua Churam
- Dies irae -Also sprach Zarathustra- (2007), Marie
- eXceed3rd-Jade Penetrate- (2007), Sariabell Orphannights
- E×E (2007), Madoka Kamigoryou
- FairChild (2007), Kotori Hazumi
- Figurehead (2007), Eolie
- Happy☆Marguerite! (2007), Karin Hortensia Minahase
- Kannabi (2007), May
- Maid to Majutsushi (2007), Hondou Crimean Ōki
- Nagagutsu o Haita Deko (2007), Kasane Aifuri
- Nono to Kuraso! (2007), Nono Nekomiya
- Pastel (2007), Mio Momose
- Pia-jong (2007), Reona Kinoshita
- Piano no Mori no Mankai no Shita (2007), Kamimori Sakurano, Konohana
- Root after and another (2007), Hamaji Yakumo
- Sweet! (2007), Haori Midou
- Time Leap (2007), Ayumu
- Akatsuki no Goei (2008), Aya Nikaido
- Akatsuki no Goei: Principal tachi no Kyujitsu (2008), Aya Nikaidou
- Asanagi no Aquanauts (2008), Mio Asanagi
- Chaos;Head (2008), Ayase Kishimoto
- Chest Chase (2008), Nishiki Kiri
- Concerto Note (2008), Seika Nanagi
- D.C.P.K.: Da Capoker (2008), Siiren
- Furufuru Full Moon (2008), Noa Ninamori
- Konboku Mahjong: Konna Mahjong ga Attara Boku wa Ron! (2008), Ayumu (Ericia Quintaine de Yggdrasil)
- Pia Carrot e Yokoso!! G.P. (2008), Hina Satō
- Prism Ark Love Love Maxim! (2008), Priecia
- Sumaga (2008), Amaho Kusakabe
- 77: And, two stars meet again (2009), Kuu
- Koko yori, Haruka -Surrounded sea in the world- (2009), Anna Hoshino
- Memoria (2009), Yuuki Hanks
- Midarete Majiwaru Ore to Hime: Hime to Shitsuji Utahime to Sonota Oozei to (2009), Hondou Crimean Ōki
- Reincarnation☆Shinsengumi' (2009), Yue Kondo
- Sakura Sakura (2009), Kurumi Tachibana
- Signal Heart (2009), Kokone Amami
- Signal Heart Plus (2009), Kokone Amami
- Skyprythem (2009), Nanami Suzushiro
- Sumaga Special (2009), Amaho Kusakabe
- Tenshinranman -Lucky or Unlucky!?- (2009), Kotaro Asagi
- Tiara (2009), Claire Dorner
- Time Leap Paradise (2009), Ayumu
- Zettai Karen! Ojōsama' (2009), Nanase Kinosaki
- Akatsuki no Goei: Tsumibukaki Shūmatsuron (2010), Aya Nikaidou
- Azanaeru (2010), Ena Fujimi
- Melclear: Mizu no Miyako ni Koi no Hanataba o (2010), Himiko Takamori
- Orange Memories (2010), Kokoro Akashi
- Otome wa Boku ni Koishiteru: Futari no Elder (2010), Utano Sasou
- Sora o Aogite Kumo Takaku (2010), Mint
- Koi to Senkyo to Chocolate (2010), Mieru Ariake
- Kimi to Boku to Eden no Ringo (2011), Karen Asakura
- Sakura Sakura Festival! (2011), Kurumi Tachibana
- Hatsukoi Time Capsule (2011), Mio Kiwada

=== Mobile games ===
- Azur Lane (2017), HMS Aurora (12)

=== Drama CDs ===
- Akanaeru Sekai no Owari ni (yyyy), Chifuyu Oumi
- Asanagi no Aquanauts (yyyy), Mio Asanagi
- Chaos;Head Drama CD:The parallel bootleg (yyyy), Ayase Kishimoto
- Dies irae Drama CD Wehrwolf (yyyy), Marie
- Gift Drama CD (series) (yyyy), Kirino Konosaka
- Happiness! Yuki no Valentine's Day (yyyy), Haruhi Kamisaka
- "Hello, world.": Butchake Hello, world. (yyyy), Hatsumi Aihara
- Himesama Ririshiku! (yyyy), Atirene
- Hoshi no Kioku (yyyy), Kaguya Houraisan
- Koi no Hibiscus (yyyy), Nono Nekomiya, Takada-san
- Magical☆Drama CD: Bust to Bust to Prelude (yyyy), Ibuki
- Otome wa Boku ni Koishiteru: Natsu no Cosmos, Aki no Matsurika (yyyy), Nao Sakurai
- Otome wa Boku ni Koishiteru (yyyy), Hirako Kajiura
- Play☆Stationery (yyyy), Harumi
- Prism Ark (series) (yyyy), Priecia
- Solfège (series) (yyyy), Kagura Fujimiya
- Sukidayo! (yyyy), Rina Shimbashi
- Sakura Sakura: Sōshisōai (yyyy), Kurumi Tachibana
- Bi -vi-: #1 Ten to Chi to (yyyy), Sanada Yukimura
- Yggdra Unison: Seiken Buyūden (yyyy), Kylier
- Yotsunoha (series) (yyyy), Nono Nekomiya

=== Dubbing ===
- Over the Hedge (2006), Stella

=== Other ===
- Voiceroid+ Kotonoha Akane & Aoi (April 2014)
- Voiceroid2 Kotonoha Akane & Aoi (June 2017)
- Synthesizer V Kotonoha Akane & Aoi (July 2020)
- A.I.VOICE Kotonoha Akane & Aoi (Bud) (February 2021)
- A.I.VOICE Kotonoha Akane & Aoi (February 2021)
- A.I.VOICE Kotonoha Akane & Aoi (English) (December 2021)
- NEUTRINO Kotonoha Akane & Aoi (April 2022)
- Seiren Voice Kotonoha Akane & Aoi (May 2022)
- A.I.VOICE Kotonoha Akane & Aoi (Chinese) (September 2022)

== Discography ==
=== Albums ===
yuithm

Released by LOVE×TRAX on January 27, 2006

1. Realythm
2. jewelry days - August Fan Box main theme
3. Egao o oikakete (笑顔を追いかけて) - Konneko opening theme
4. Maboroshi (幻影～まぼろし～) - Mozu no Nie... ~Hayanie no Sho~ opening theme
5. Haru ni saku Omoi (春に咲く想い) - Ane mo ne opening theme
6. Kirari☆Natsu (キラリ☆夏) - to... opening theme
7. It's just love - Sukidayo! ending theme
8. Kooru Tsuki no Yoru (凍る月の夜) - UNDER GROUND endingtheme
9. Ibarahime (棘姫) - Papillon Rose G opening theme
10. Hōyō (抱擁) - Nukumori no naka de opening theme
11. Takaramono (タカラモノ) - Motto! Ojamajo Doremi ending theme
12. school meet you - Sukumizu Police opening theme
13. Rin (凛～りん～) - Ane mo ne ending theme
14. Traveling - Blaze of Destiny ending theme
15. melody
16. Ai no Gush! (愛のGUSH!) (secret track)

HONEY

Released by LOVE×TRAX on September 22, 2006

1. HONEY
2. refrain - Blaze of Destiny opening theme
3. Favorite Love - Otaku☆Masshigura opening theme
4. Doki Doki ga Tomaranai (Doki Dokiが止まらない) - Mirorama opening theme
5. Yoru ga kuru tabi (夜がくるたび) - Mirorama ending theme
6. You make me! - Yu Me Ku Me! ~Wakeari Bukken, Yōsei Tsuki~ opening theme
7. Wake me up! - Koiotome opening theme
8. Kanata (彼方) - Papillon Rose G ending theme
9. Beautiful Harmony - Bra-ban! -The bonds of melody- opening theme
10. Koisuru Tokei (恋するとけい) - Konneko ending theme
11. Shining Orange - Yotsunoha ending theme
12. Happy Birthday
13. ONE DAY - Akanaeru Sekai no Owari ni insert song
14. Kono Hana Saku Koro (此の花咲ク頃) - Piano no Mori no Mankai no Shita opening theme
15. Love×2♪song -English Version-

princess

Released by LOVE×TRAX on September 21, 2007

1. princess
2. Chu×Chu!! - Chu×Chu Idol -The idol is a Vampire? opening theme
3. I Will...! - Utsurigi Nanakoi Tenkiame opening theme
4. Just I wish - Utsurigi Nanakoi Tenkiame insert song
5. Darling (ダーリン) - Osananajimi tono Kurashikata opening theme
6. VOYAGEURS - NEO STEAM image song
7. Hapiday♪ (はぴでい♪) - Happiness! Re:Lucks opening theme
8. SINCLAIR - Shūmatsu Shōjo Gensō Alicematic opening theme
9. core - Shūmatsu Shōjo Gensō Alicematic insert theme
10. SHOOTING STAR - Itsuka, Todoku, Anosorani. opening theme
11. Trust in me - EXE opening theme
12. Eternal Destiny - Yoake Mae yori Ruri Iro na opening theme
13. LOVEclick☆ - LOVE×Radio theme song
14. dreaming - Hobi Radi theme song

Joker

Released by LOVE×TRAX☆Records on September 10, 2008

1. Love Game (JOKER prelude)
2. JOKER - G-Taste OVA theme song
3. Einsatz - Dies irae opening theme
4. Believe
5. Happy Leap - Time Leap opening theme
6. Over the Light - Nanairo Kanata insert song
7. Together - Akatsuki no Goei opening theme
8. Furu Furu☆ (ふるふるっ☆) - Furufuru☆Fullmoon opening theme
9. Till I can see you again - Chu x Chu Paradise ending theme
10. Get Love Power - Konboku Mahjong: Konna Mahjong ga Attara Boku wa Ron! opening theme
11. Aqua Voice - Asanagi no Aquanauts opening theme
12. Ready Go!! - Fate/Tiger Colosseum opening theme
13. Imitation - Imitation Lover opening theme
14. Girl meets Boy - Tokimeki Fantasy Latale image song
15. message!

~PHANTASM~ End Prophecy as FES (PHANTASM 1st album)

Compilation album of songs from Chaos;Head; Released by Media Factory on May 6, 2009

1. Mikkyō no Kubikazari (密教の首飾り) (Black Mass Ver.)
2. Shokuzai no Erotika (贖罪のエロティカ)
3. Zaika ni Keiyaku no Chi o (罪過に契約の血を)
4. Yami ni Hikari o Tomosu Mono (闇に光を灯す者)
5. Haritsuke no Misa (磔のミサ) (To the distance Ver.)
6. Haruka Naru Idiyona (遙かなるイディヨナ) (Heavy Generation Ver.)
7. Hallelujah no Fukuin (アレルイヤの福音, Areruiya no Fukuin) (Extra Solo Ver.)
8. Gladiale (グラジオール, Gurajiōru)
9. Nageki no Arabesque (嘆きのアラベスク, Nageki no Arabesuku)

Dream Party Memorial Album

Released by DreamParty Secretariat on June 30, 2009

1. Brightness
2. Dream a go!go! (ArrangementVersion)
3. Motto, Yume, Miyō!! (もっと、夢、見よう!!) (CoverVersion)
4. Premonition Dream (ArrangementVersion)
5. Shiny Road
6. Rose quartz (ArrangementVersion)
7. Summer Angel☆
8. To be continued...
9. Happy Day☆ (ArrangementVersion)
10. The desert of time
11. Thank you for us (ArrangementVersion)
12. Sign

LOVE×singles

Released by LOVE×TRAX on July 3, 2009

1. Jewelry days - August Fan Box theme song
2. Love×2♪song - LOVE×Radio theme song
3. Kono Hana Haku Koro (此の花咲ク頃) - Piano no Mori no Mankai no Shita opening theme
4. Chiru Hana Sakura (ちるはなさくら) - Piano no Mori no Mankai no Shita ending theme
5. Eternal Destiny - Yoake Mae yori Ruri Iro na opening theme
6. Love☆Emergency - LOVE×Radio theme song
7. Imitation - Imitation Lover opening theme
8. feel - Imitation Lover ending theme
9. Jewelry days (Instrumental)
10. Love×2♪song (Instrumental)
11. Kono Hana Haku Koro (此の花咲ク頃) (Instrumental)
12. Chiru Hana Sakura (ちるはなさくら) (Instrumental)
13. Eternal Destiny (Instrumental)
14. Love☆Emergency (Instrumental)
15. Imitation (Instrumental)
16. feel (Instrumental)

Yeeeeell!

Released by LOVE×TRAX on August 26, 2009

1. Yeeeeell!
2. It's show time - Time Leap Paradise opening theme
3. Mecha Koi Ranman☆ (メチャ恋らんまん☆) - Tenshinranman -LUCKY or UNLUCKY!?- opening theme
4. Boku no Sekai (ボクノセカイ) - ''Alpeggio: Kimiiro no Melody opening theme
5. ACTION!
6. warmth
7. Eternal Ring - Unity Marriage: Futari no Hanayome opening theme
8. Taiyou no Saku Hoshi de (太陽の咲く星で) - Himawari no Chapel de Kimi to opening theme
9. Festivity - Chu×Chu Paradise theme song
10. Blue eyes - Asanagi no Aquanauts ending theme
11. Try Real! - Fate/tiger Colosseum UPPER theme song
12. selfish
13. Yume no Tsume -End in childhood- (夢の罪 -End in childhood-) - Potto -Rondo for Dears- opening theme
14. Shinju no Uta (真珠のうた) - "Hello, world." ending theme
15. Kiseki no Kizuna (2009 mix) (奇跡の絆(2009mix)) - Meguri, Hitohira opening theme

EVERGREEN

Released by b-fairy records on November 26, 2009

1. Jōnetsu no partita (情熱のpartita)
2. Gessei no Kanon (月聖ノ蒼炎曲) - Galaxy Angel II Eigō Kaiki no Toki opening theme
3. Aqua Voice - Asanagi no Aquanauts opening theme
4. Sakura Philosophy (さくらフィロソフィー) - Sakura Tail opening theme
5. Ping×Otome=Koi (ピンク×乙女 = 恋) - Ane imo 2: Imoimo Fan Disc opening theme
6. Hapiday♪ (はぴでい♪) - Happiness! opening theme
7. Switch on♪ (スイッチ･オン♪) - H_{2}O: Footprints in the Sand insert song
8. Tsurugi no Mai (剣の舞) - Musō Tōrō theme song
9. Unmei no Revolution (運命のRevolution) - Galaxy Angel II Eigō Kaiki no Toki ending theme of chapter 8 and 10
10. Netsujō Story (熱情STORY) - Monster Collection TCG theme song
11. Melody Time (メロディータイム) - Time Leap Paradise ending theme
12. Kitto Yume to Yuki de Dekiteiru (きっと夢と雪でできている) - Harumoi opening theme
13. Katayoku no Icarus (片翼のイカロス) - H_{2}O: Footprints in the Sand opening song

You♡I

Released by 5pb. on February 3, 2010

1. LOOP
2. Toki no Nai Sekai (時のない世界) - 12RIVEN opening theme
3. Happiness Hōteishiki (はぴねす方程式) - Happiness! De:Luxe opening theme
4. Shoshite Boku wa... (そして僕は...) - Prism Ark opening theme
5. Silky Rain - Anison Plus opening theme in June 2009
6. Nanairo MERRY→GO→ROUND (七色MERRY→GO→ROUND)
7. Magical☆Generation (マジカル☆ジェネレーション) - Happiness! ending theme
8. Distance - 12RIVEN ending theme
9. RISE -Prism Ark AWAKE ending theme
10. Déjà vu - Hapitora -Happy Transportation- opening theme
11. Koi no Honoo (恋の炎) - Kanokon ending theme
12. Natsu no Inori (夏の祈り) - Kanokon Esuii insert song
13. Eien no Koi (永遠の恋) - Kanokon Esuii ending song
14. Eternal Snow - Anison Plus opening theme in February 2009
15. You I - we will be together

BLOODY TUNE

Released by LOVE×TRAX on August 25, 2010

1. BLOODY TUNE
2. Gregorio (L×T mix) Dies irae -Also sprach Zarathustra- opening theme
3. Gensō no Shiro (幻想の城) - Akatsuki no Goei: Tsumibukaki Shūmatsuron opening theme
4. Refrain (リフレイン) - Natsuzora Kanata ending theme
5. Miss．Brand-new day - Zettai☆Maō opening theme
6. FairChild - FairChild opening theme
7. Idol Revolution (アイドルレボリューション) - Airebo -IDOL☆REVOLUTION- opening theme
8. My Dear HERO - RGH: Koi to Hero to Gakuen to ending theme
9. =Suki (= スキ) - Sweet! opening theme
10. Love☆Jet! - LOVE×Radio theme song
11. summer day
12. STAR LEGEND - 77: And, two stars meet again opening theme
13. Gattenshi (月天子) - Touhou Project Side Story: Hoshi no Kioku ending theme
14. ONENESS!
15. HONEY -dance remix- (HAPPY☆LOVE×Live 2009 original remix)

~PHANTASM~ Revival Prophecy as FES (PHANTASM 2nd album)

Released by Media Factory on December 21, 2011

1. Toki Tsukasadoru Juuni no Meiyaku (刻司ル十二ノ盟約) - Steins;Gate -Anime ED-
2. Sora to Chijo no Creation (空と地上のクレアシオン)
3. Preghiera no Tsukiyo ni (プレギエーレの月夜に) - Steins;Gate -PSP ED-
4. Masquerade ~NoAH Daisanshou Retsuou Shinseikihen Yori~ (マスカレード 〜ノア第三章列王新世紀編より〜) - Steins;Gate -main theme from Rai-Net anime-
5. Innocence ~Satsuriku no Souseiki Shihen Saishuushou Yori~ (イノセンス〜殺戮の創世記詩編 最終章より〜) - Chaos;Head Noah -PSP ED-
6. Inori no Violet (祈りのヴィオレット) - Chaos;Head Love Chu☆Chu -Xbox 360 ED-
7. EUPHORIA ~Tsugunai no Requiem~ (EUPHORIA〜償いのレクイエム〜) - Steins;Gate: Hiyoku Renri no Darling -ED-
8. Uruwashiki Seduce (麗しきセデュース)
9. Bukaku no Rumieso (深淵のルミエラ)
10. Jade Kaviriere (翡翠のカヴィリエーレ) - Chaos;Head Love Chu☆Chu -PSP ED-
11. Zaika ni Keiyaku no Chi o ～Album Limited Version～ (罪過に契約の血を (アルバムLimitedバージョン)) - Chaos;Head -insert song-
12. Prophecy ～Gate of Steiner～
13. Unmei no Farfalla (運命のファルファッラ) - Steins;Gate -Xbox 360 ED-

=== Maxi singles ===
jewelry days

Released by LOVE×TRAX☆Records on August 27, 2004

1. jewelry days - August Fan Box main theme
2. Love×2♪song - LOVE×Radio main theme
3. Jewelry days (instrumental)
4. Love×2♪song (instrumental)

Kono Hana Saku Koro

Released by LOVE×TRAX☆Records on August 29, 2005

1. Kono Hana Saku Koro (此の花咲ク頃) - Piano no Mori no Mankai no Shita opening theme
2. Chiru Hana Sakura (ちるはなさくら) - Piano no Mori no Mankai no Shita ending theme
3. Kono Hana saku koro (instrumental)
4. Chiru Hana Sakura (instrumental)

Eternal Destiny

Released by LOVE×TRAX☆Records on September 30, 2005

1. Eternal Destiny - Yoake Mae yori Ruri Iro na opening theme
2. Love☆Emergency - LOVE×Radio main theme
3. Eternal Destiny (instrumental)
4. Love☆Emergency (instrumental)

Imitation

Released by LOVE×TRAX☆Records on April 14, 2006

1. Imitation - Imitation Lover opening theme
2. feel - Imitation Lover ending theme
3. Imitation (instrumental)
4. feel (instrumental)

Dream a go!go!

Released by DreamParty Secretariat on October 13, 2006

1. Dream a go!go! - DreamParty 2nd image song
2. Motto, Yume, Miyō!! (もっと、夢、見よう!!) - DreamParty image song
3. Boku no Sekai (ボクノセカイ) (short version) - Alpeggio opening theme
4. Dream a go! go!（OffVocal）
5. Motto, Yume, Miyō!! (off Vocal)

Magical★Generation

Released by Media Factory on October 25, 2006

1. Magical★Generation (マジカル★ジェネレーション) - Happiness! ending theme
2. Happiness Hōteishiki (はぴねす方程式) - Happiness! De:Luxe opening theme
3. Magical★Generation (off Vocal)
4. Happiness Hōteishiki (off Vocal)

Again

Released by Star Child on October 25, 2006

1. Again - Otome wa Boku ni Koishiteru insert song
2. Beautiful day - Otome wa Boku ni Koishiteru ending theme
3. Again (off Vocal)
4. Beautiful day (off Vocal)

Far Away

Released by LOVE×TRAX☆Records on April 6, 2007

1. Far Away - Figurehead opening theme
2. Ai no Uta (アイノウタ) - Figurehead main theme
3. Far Away (instrumental)
4. Ai no Uta (instrumental)

Premonition Dream / Shiny Road

Released by DreamParty Secretariat on April 29, 2007 (in DreamParty 2007 Spring) / May 4, 2007 (general)

1. Premonition Dream - DreamParty 2007 Spring image song
2. Shiny Road - DreamParty 2007 Spring image song
3. Premonition Dream (off vocal)
4. Shiny Road (off vocal)

Soshite Boku wa...

Released by Five Records on October 24, 2007

1. Soshite Boku wa... (そして僕は...) - Prism Ark (anime) opening theme
2. RISE - Prism Ark AWAKE (PS2) ending theme
3. Soshite Boku wa... (off vocal)
4. RISE (off vocal)

SHINING STAR

Released by LOVE×TRAX☆Records on October 25, 2007

1. SHINING STAR - Itsuka, Todoku, Anosora ni. opening theme
2. SHINING STAR (instrumental)

Katayoku no Icarus

Released by b-fairy records on January 25, 2008

1. Katayoku no Icarus (片翼のイカロス, Katayoku no Ikarosu) - H_{2}O: Footprints in the Sand opening theme
2. Switch on♪ (スイッチ･オン♪) - H_{2}O: Footprints in the Sand insert song
3. Katayoku no Icarus (off vocal)
4. Switch on♪ (off vocal)

Koisuru Kioku / Negai

Released by Geneon Entertainment on February 29, 2008; This maxi single contains a song by Chata.

1. Koisuru Kioku (恋する記憶) (Yui Sakakibara) - Yotsunoha (OVA) opening theme
2. Negai (ねがい) (Chata) - Yotsunoha (OVA) ending theme
3. Koisuru Kioku (off vocal)
4. Negai (off vocal)

Koi no Honoo

Released by 5pb. on April 23, 2008

1. Koi no Honoo (恋の炎) - Kanokon (anime) ending theme
2. Sweet Time - Kanokon Radio ending theme
3. Koi no Honoo (恋の炎) (off vocal)
4. Sweet Time (off vocal)

Soon / Love Rice

Released by Geneon Entertainment on July 23, 2008; This maxi single contains a song by Chata.

1. Soon (Yui Sakakibara) - Yotsunoha: A journey of sincerity opening theme
2. Love Rice (ラブライス) (Chata) - Yotsunoha: A journey of sincerity ending theme
3. Soon (off vocal)
4. Love Rice (off vocal)
5. Soon (GAMEver.) (Yui Sakakibara) - Yotsunoha: A journey of sincerity opening theme
6. Love Rice (Chata) - Yotsunoha: A journey of sincerity ending theme

Eien no Koi

Released by 5pb. on September 24, 2008

1. Eien no Koi (永遠の恋) - Kanokon Esuii ending theme
2. Natsu no Inori (夏の祈り) - Kanokon Esuii insert song
3. Eien no Koi (off vocal)
4. Natsu no Inori (off vocal)

Try Real!

Released by Geneon Entertainment on October 29, 2008

1. Try Real! - Fate/tiger colosseum UPPER theme song
2. Try Real! (off vocal ver.)
3. Try Real! (fate on fake mix / Sampling Master MEGA)

Gessei no Kanon

Released by b-fairy records on November 26, 2008

1. Gessei no Kanon (月聖ノ蒼炎曲(カノン)) - Galaxy Angel II Eigō Kaiki no Toki opening theme
2. Unmei no Revolution (運命のRevolution) - Galaxy Angel II Eigō Kaiki no Toki insert song
3. Gessei no Kanon (off vocal)
4. Unmei no Revolution (off vocal)

Love Island

Released by LOVE×TRAX☆Records on December 24, 2008; This maxi single was sold on only Comic Toranoana.

1. Love Island - 15 Bishōjo Hyōrūki opening theme
2. chance - 15 Bishōjo Hyōrūki ending theme
3. Love Island（instrumental）
4. chance （instrumental）

Tsurugi no Mai

Released by b-fairy records on February 4, 2009

1. Tsurugi no Mai (剣の舞) - Musō Tōrō theme song
2. Toki o Koete (時を越えて) - Musō Tōrō insert song
3. Tsurugi no Mai (off vocal)
4. Toki o Koete (off vocal)

KoIGoRoMo / Eternal Snow

Released by Five Records on March 25, 2009

1. KoIGoRoMo - Kemeko Deluxe! DS: Yome to Mecha to Otoko to Onna opening theme
2. Eternal Snow - Anison Plus opening theme in February 2009
3. KoIGoRoMo (off vocal)
4. Eternal Snow (off vocal)

Marionette

Released by LOVE×TRAX☆Records on March 25, 2009

1. Marionette - PYGMALION opening theme
2. Haitoku no Waltz (背徳の円舞曲)
3. Marionette (instrumental)
4. Haitoku no Waltz (instrumental)

Déjà vu / Silky Rain

Released by 5pb. on March 25, 2009

1. Déjà vu - Hapitora -Happy Transportation- opening theme
2. Silky Rain - Anison Plus opening theme in June 2009
3. Déjà vu (off vocal)
4. Silky Rain (off vocal)

Nyanderful!/Cross the Rainbow

Released by Five Records on October 21, 2009

1. Nyanderful! (にゃんだふる!) - Nyan Koi! opening theme
2. Cross the Rainbow - Nyan Koi! Radio Jōkō Rikujōbu ending theme
3. Nyanderful! (off vocal)
4. Cross the Rainbow (off vocal)

Komorebi no Sordino

Released by 5pb. on November 25, 2009

1. Komorebi no Sordino (木漏れ日のソルディーノ) - Kanokon: Manatsu no Dai Shanikusai opening theme
2. Hollow: Akatsuki no Sora ni (Hollow 〜暁のそらに〜) - Akatsuki no Amaneca to Aoi Kyojin opening theme
3. Komorebi no Sordino (off vocal)
4. Hollow: Akatsuki no Sora ni (off vocal)

Happy⇔Lucky X'mas♪

Released by LOVE×TRAX☆Records on December 18, 2009

1. Happy⇔Lucky X'mas♪
2. I remembers
3. Happy⇔Lucky X'mas♪ (instrumental)
4. I remembers (instrumental)

Konton no Oratorio

Released by b-fairy records on February 10, 2010

1. Konton no Oratorio (混沌のオラトリオ) - Game Book DS: Aquarian Age Perpetual Period theme song
2. Blue Bird Syndrome (BLUEBIRDシンドローム)
3. Konton no Oratorio (off vocal)
4. Blue Bird Syndrome (off vocal)

Let's start now

Released by LOVE×TRAX☆Records on July 30, 2010

1. Let's start now - Sora o Aogite Kumo Takaku theme song
2. I don't wanna forget - Sora o Aogite Kumo Takaku ending theme
3. Let's start now (instrumental)
4. I don't wanna forget (instrumental)

LOVE×Quartet 2010

Released by LOVE×TRAX☆Records on December 24, 2010

1. Again (Quartet Ver.)
2. Kono Hana Saku Koro (此の花咲ク頃) (Quartet Ver.)
3. Katayoku no Icarus (片翼のイカロス) (Quartet Ver.)
4. Again (violin Ver.)
5. Kono Hana Saku Koro (violin Ver.)
6. Katayoku no Icarus (violin Ver.)
7. Again (Quartet Instrumental)
8. Kono Hana Saku Koro (Quartet Instrumental)
9. Katayoku no Icarus (Quartet Instrumental)
