= Prism Ark =

Japanese video game and anime series

- Logo from anime's OP.

プリズム·アーク 〜プリズム·ハート エピソード2〜 (Purizum Āku ~Purizumu Hāto Episōdo2~)
- Genre: Eroge Fantasy Romance Action Comedy
- Video game

PRISM ARK ~PRISM HEART II~
- Developer: Pajamas Soft
- Genre: Eroge, Visual novel, S-RPG
- Platform: Windows
- Released: August 25, 2006 (initial ed.); September 22, 2006 (normal ed.); March 2, 2007 (remaster ed.)
- Video game

PRISM ARK -AWAKE-
- Developer: Pajamas Soft
- Publisher: 5pb.
- Genre: Visual novel
- Platform: PlayStation 2
- Released: January 2008
- Video game

PRISM ARK Love^{2} Maximum
- Genre: Eroge, Visual novel
- Platform: Windows
- Released: January 25, 2008
- Manga
- Written by: Pajamas Soft
- Illustrated by: Tatsuya Saeki
- Published by: MediaWorks
- Magazine: Dengeki Daioh
- Original run: December 2005 – October 2006
- Volumes: 1
- Manga
- Written by: Pajamas Soft
- Illustrated by: FBC
- Published by: Media Factory
- Magazine: Monthly Comic Alive
- Original run: August 2007 – present
- Anime television series
- Directed by: Masami Ōbari
- Studio: FRONTLINE
- Original network: Chiba TV etc.
- Original run: October 8, 2007 – December 23, 2007
- Episodes: 12

Prism Ark ~Prism Heart 2~ (プリズム・アーク 〜プリズム・ハート エピソード2〜, Purizumu Āku ~Purizumu Hāto Episōdo2~) is a Japanese erotic video game and the sequel of Prism Heart developed by Pajamas Soft. Its first release was on August 25, 2006. This work contains adult-only content of a sexual nature.

An anime entitled Prism Ark began airing on Chiba TV, on October 8, 2007.

== Characters ==
The voice actors are listed from drama CD and anime version.

Hyaweh (ハヤウェイ, Hayawei)
Voiced by: Kenichi Suzumura (DramaCD), Tetsuya Kakihara (anime))
Weapon: Ala-Gladius (Bastard sword)
The main protagonist in the Prism Ark games. Hyaweh enrolled in the knight school in Windland and it was during that time that he met most of the other characters. He is a typical laid-back student, both in the game and in the anime, doing things like skipping class and forgetting textbooks. Nevertheless, he is shown to be very talented as he can fight well physically as well as competently use both offensive and recovery magic, while most other students are only able to use one of the three. He appears to dislike fighting with others, always trying to escape if it is an option. He will, however, step up to protect others. He seems to have fallen from the sky as an infant along with the sword, Ala-Gladius. His actual origins are never made clear, but he is implied to be from the Ark, a high-tech spaceship orbiting the Prism Ark world.
In both the game and the anime, Hyaweh's sword is shown to have the power to destroy the Angels. However, the actual power it manifests differs between the game and the anime. In the game, the sword merely prevents Angels from moving when its power awakens. In the anime series, the sword is used to physically attack Angels, and in the last episode Hyaweh awakens the Ala-Gladius together with Priecia, which calls down energy from a geosynchronic satellite, which transforms the two into a supernatural being which can rival the Angels. Later in the anime, he appeared to fall in love with Priecia who also fell in love with him.

Priecia (プリーシア, Purīsia)
Voiced by: Yui Sakakibara
Weapon: Ruby Flash (Rapier)
The main protagonist in the anime series. Priecia is thought to be the princess of Wind land. She is also enrolled in the knight school where she met the other characters, such as Hyaweh, Kagura, Fel, Filia. In the school, she was widely known for her expert swordsmanship as well as her beauty, however, she did not have any friends at first, mainly due to her arrogant attitude. Her weapon of choice is her rapier Ruby Flash, which is approximately a foot shorter than her. Her true identity is the daughter of Kizarov and a kagemusha (body double) for the true princess (Filia) even though she wears the promised pocketwatch of the king and queen. Hyaweh appeared to love her and would do anything to protect her. She also loves Hyaweh.

Kagura (神楽, Kagura)
Voiced by: Hitomi Nabatame
Weapon: Amagami-no-Mikoto (Nagayumi)
She is sent to protect Priecia and is an accomplished healer with expert bowmanship. When she first arrived, she followed Priecia everywhere, causing much annoyance to Priecia. The two later became good friends. In the game, Kagura is revealed to have consumed an Elixir of Life, a sacred treasure in the shrine her family handled, when a plague wiped out the surrounding area. Although she doesn't talk much, she has excellent archery skills.
Fel (フェル, Feru)
Voiced by: Kaori Mizuhashi
Weapon: Magical Lovely Stick (War Hammer)
An extremely hyper girl. Wields a typical magical girl staff. She has awkward elven ears with pink hair and green eyes. She is proficient with all types of magic, but shows a particular interest in ice magic. In the game, she is shown to be an orphan, who was led to a Viellan research facility with the false belief that she would be undergoing health tests prior to meeting foster parents. She escaped from the research facility with some other orphans, though all the others were re-captured and only she was never found. She was also shown to have wings growing on her back as a result of the experiments.

Karin Mibu (壬生 華鈴, Mibu Karin)
Voiced by: Naoko Matsui
Weapon: Kotetsu and Kikuichimonji (Katana)
A melee instructor in the academy, and a member of the Tempelritter. Wields dual katanas. Even though she appears to be fearless in the face of Angels, she was proven to be afraid of ghosts. She was originally good friends with Theresa, and would often visit the orphanage for war orphans that the latter watched over. However, the two became enemies when Karin believed that Theresa had led the orphans to be slaughtered by the Tempelritter. She is shown to love nesagi (rabbit-like animal in the game with very long ears, a pun on usagi, the Japanese word for rabbit) as well as haiku (a type of Japanese poem). She also has a very poor sense of direction.

Sister Hell (シスター·ヘル, Sisutā Heru)
Voiced by: Yu Asakawa
Weapon: Expiatio (Crossing Sword)
She is one of the main antagonists in the series, a mercenary hired by the Sablum emperor. Her real name is Theresa. When she is not fighting, she supports a group of orphan children she saved in the past. However, she extremely detests the cross of the Viellan church. She is extremely powerful and is able to fight evenly or better than Karin. She seems to be the main heroine in the Prism Ark fandisk "Theresa to Heart". She was originally a devout follower of the Viellan faith and managed an orphanage, but betrayed her faith when members of the Tempelritter slaughtered the orphans while chasing escapees from a Viellan research facility.

Litte Ratus (リッテ·ラートゥス, Ritte Rātusu)
Voiced by: Kimiko Koyama
Weapon: Bud and Fys (Directivity Automagically Floating Prism)
A teacher in the academy. She also teaches magic, as she is seen as a powerful magic user herself. She does not like being treated as a child, despite her small stature and her childish personality, but rather as a teacher. Hyaweh tends to wonder if she is going through a phase where she would like to be treated as an adult. Her choice of weapon appears to be what seems to be two floating spheres. Late in the game and anime, she is shown spying for Judas.

Filia (フィーリア, Fīria)
Voiced by: Haruko Momoi
Weapon: Brush of Pegasus Class
Hyaweh's little sister, who is a maid in the academy. Late in the game, she is revealed to be Filiaregis von Grunewald, the actual missing princess of Windland.

Bridget (ブリジット, Burijitto)
Voiced by: Kana Asumi (anime)
She only appears in the anime. She is a spy sent by the Sablum Empire to infiltrate Windland. Her mission includes assassinating the princess and to determine Windland's power, but has failed multiple attempts and opportunities to assassinate Priecia, as she appears to be very clumsy. Her weapon of choice is a dagger.

Ein (エイン, Ein)
Voiced by: Kamiya Hiroshi (DramaCD), Takuma Terashima (anime)
A very powerful magician, and one of Hyaweh's roommates. His spells are so powerful that even he himself cannot control the power of it. He was taught magic before he entered the academy by a neighbor. He has trained for five years in order to learn to control the power of his spells, with no success. Since he is afraid that the power of the spells would hurt those around him, he tries to isolate himself from others.

Acty (アクティ, Akutī)
Voiced by: Hiroki Takahashi (DramaCD), Yūki Tai (anime)
One of Hyaweh's roommates. His weapon of choice is a huge sword, called the Acty Sword. He also part-times at a hostess club as an advertiser. He is also shown to be afraid of the dark, because of an incident in his childhood where his parents were murdered by soldiers while he and his sister remained hiding.

Jung (ユング, Yungu)
Voiced by: Kōki Miyata (DramaCD), Yu Kobayashi (anime)
Another one of Hyaweh's roommates. He is shown to be possessive of Hyaweh, and thinks of him as an older brother. His own older brother died from a sickness, and his stepmother avoids him to stop being reminded of her own dead son. He joins the academy to improve his skill in magic, in which he was always inferior to his elder brother, only to later discover with Hyaweh's help that his talent actually lay in recovery magic.

Kizarov (キザーロフ, Kizārofu)
Voiced by: Kōsuke Okano
School headmaster, and became the de facto ruler of Windland when Meister went missing. Although he generally puts on a goofy, perverted act, he becomes strict and serious when needed. He is also said to be one of the strongest fencers in Wind Land, with Meister and Princea as near equals. He defeats the Darkness Knight after telling him that he is Meister, the king of Wind Land.

Darkness Knight (闇黒騎士, Ankoku Kishi)
Voiced by: Sho Hayami
Another main antagonist in the series, he is also a mercenary hired by the Sablum Emperor. In the anime he saved Hyaweh and Filia from an angel when they were children and Hyaweh has been keeping a dagger the Darkness Knight used to save him. Count Kisarov reveals him to be Meister, the king, and he seems to have memory damage. In the game, it was revealed that after he was captured by the Sablum army, he forced to put on a cursed helmet, which caused him to lose his own personality.

Judas (ジュダス, Judasu)
Voiced by: Kōji Ishii (DramaCD), Yuichi Nakamura (anime)
He is the commander of the "Tempelritter", the number one squad in the Viellan army. In the anime, he wishes to see Hyaweh awaken the true power of the Ala-Gladius. In the game, he is intent on becoming a god by obtaining the power of the Ark.

Meister (マイステル, Maisuteru)
Voiced by: Sho Hayami, Yū Kobayashi (child) (anime)
The ruling king, but his whereabouts are unknown. Not much is known about him after the ending of Prism Heart. He promised Princea that he would find her when they were little kids. Appears to have become the Darkness Knight after losing his memory. He returns after Kizarov defeats him.

Princea (プリンセア, Purinsea)
Voiced by: Masumi Asano (anime)
The ruling queen, but her whereabouts are unknown. Not much is known about her after the ending of Prism Heart. Her weapon of choice is a rapier, like Priecia. She had a little brother, but he died in her teens from illness which he had since he was a child. She is revealed to be held captive by those who wish to become god in the last episode.

Echo (エコー, Ekō)
Voiced by: Sayaka Ohara (anime)
Another character from Prism Heart. She is the head of the self-governed Magic Guild. In the game, she is only mentioned in passing, but in the anime she is extremely beautiful so she acts as a spy among the harem of the Sablam emperor.

Komet (コメート, Kometo)

== Angels ==
Angels are weapons used by the Sablum Empire. Late in the game, they are revealed to be biological weapons irreversibly created from humans. Viella's own attempts to create a superior Angel is one of the main plot points in the game, which was cut in the anime adaptation. Four types of angels are seen in the game; three used by the Zablum empire are named Xaqel (轟力天使 ザクェル), Radiel (攻速天使 ラディェル) and Phagiel (光輪天使 ファギェル), while the one used by Viella is named Ultima Angel (究極天使 ウルティマ・アンゲル).

== Media ==
=== Visual novel ===
Prism Ark ~Prism Heart 2~ began as an adult visual novel for Windows by Pajamas Soft first released on August 25, 2006. This work is a continuation of Prism Heart released on October 6, 2000. The game will be ported to the PlayStation 2 on January in 2008 with the adult content removed under the title Prism Ark -Awake-.

==== Theme songs ====
Opening theme for Windows
"Shokuzai no Rhapsody" (贖罪のラプソディー) by Haruko Momoi
"Genzai no Requiem" (原罪のレクイエム) by Kotoko
Ending theme for Windows
"Sigh..." by Haruko Momoi
"Tsuioku no Nocturne" (追憶のノクターン) by Suzuka Nakahara
Opening theme for PS2
"Yuuen no Amulet" (悠遠のアミュレット) by momo-i
"HiKaRi" by Ayumi Murata
Ending theme for PS2
"RIZE" by Yui Sakakibara

=== Manga ===
A manga, illustrated by Tatsuya Saeki, was in serial form in the Japanese seinen manga magazine Dengeki Daioh published by MediaWorks since December 2005 issue until October 2007 issue. A bound volume went on sale on November 27, 2006, in Japan.

Another manga series, illustrated by FBC, began serialization in the seinen manga magazine Monthly Comic Alive in August 2007 issue, published by Media Factory.

=== Anime ===
An anime series began airing in Japan on Chiba TV on October 8, 2007. Some of the characters from the prequel also made appearances in the series.

==== Episodes ====
No.	Title	Original air date on CTC
1	"The Battlefield of Knights" "Kishitachi no Senjō" (騎士たちの戦場)	October 8, 2007
Introduction of all the characters and the setting of the anime and discusses the Land of Wind (Europe) and Sablum Empire* (Ottoman empire or saracans). Priecia's parents are also briefly profiled when they first meet as children.
2	"The School of Knights" "Kishitachi no Hanazono" (騎士たちの学園)	October 15, 2007
An assassin is sent by the Sablum to kill Priecia. Everyone mistakes her as the princess instead.
3	"The Goals of Knights" "Kishitachi no Mokuhyō" (騎士たちの目標)	October 22, 2007
Hyaweh makes fun of Priecia and angers her. Her admirers search for different ways to get rid of him.
4	"The Prides of Knights" "Kishitachi no Puraido" (騎士たちの誇り)	October 28, 2007
A new student named Kagura follows Priecia claiming to be her new bodyguard. Priecia challenges Kagura to a duel and decides to accept Kagura's protection.
5	"The Ordeal for Knights" "Kishitachi no Shiren" (騎士たちの試練)	November 5, 2007
The Prism Exam, dubbed Puriken by the headmaster, is about to begin. Priecia is having difficulties of indecision about being a knight, but was later enlightened and encouraged by Hyaweh's words.
6	"The Day off for Knights" "Kishitachi no Kyuujitsu" (騎士たちの休日)	November 12, 2007
Hyaweh, Priecia and the rest go into town for the day. After an embarrassing situation Hyaweh and Priecia run away and end up spending the day alone together, but they soon get attacked by enemies and Priecia gets kidnapped, but Hyaweh is ready to save her.
7	"The First campaign of Knights" "Kishitachi no Uijin" (騎士たちの初陣)	November 19, 2007
Hyaweh, Priecia and the others are assigned to protect a frontier fort. Arriving at the fort, the students are ambushed by an angel. When Priecia is injured, Hyaweh unleashes the power of his sword and destroys the angel.
8	"Wandering Knights" "Samayou Kishitachi" (彷徨う騎士たち)	November 26, 2007
Upset that Hyaweh got injured protecting her, Priecia runs away from school and meets a nun named Teresa. Teresa questions Priecia's beliefs and makes her ponder why she wants to be a knight.
9	"Knights meet again" "Saikaisuru Kishitachi" (再会する騎士たち)	December 3, 2007
When Hyaweh finds Priecia, Karin is close behind and discovers Teresa. The two face off with Karin in rage about Teresa's past deeds. Priecia saves Karin and masters the Mirage Lance technique when defeating Teresa. The dark knight interferes and remembered something after seeing the pendant, and it's Hyaweh's chance to stab his forehead.
10	"The Heart of Knights" "Kishitachi no Hāto" (騎士たちの剣魂(ハート))	December 10, 2007
The annual school festival is coming up, and everyone is looking forward to the PNP (Prism Night Party) where an event called the PPP (Prism Prince & Princess) is the main highlight. Priecia, who has challenged Hyaweh to a duel, is convinced to participate in an acting competition, thanks to Fel and the Headmaster.
11	"The Dance of Knights" "Kishitachi no Enbu" (騎士たちの演舞)	December 17, 2007
The school festival has now commenced. Everyone, including the teachers, competed intensely to obtain the Breast Armor, to the point where they even used their special techniques (those who possess the armor pair is crowned the pair for the PPP, and will be the main characters in the play). With the pair having to kiss in the final scene of the play, will Priecia succeed in being paired with Hyaweh?
12	"The Ark of Knights" "Kishitachi no Āku" (騎士たちの閃光(アーク))	December 24, 2007
Hyaweh and Priecia face off in the graduation duel to determine the student representative. Priecia wins and decides to confess everything to Hyaweh during the graduation ball. Priecia reveals that she is the container for the true princess, and Hyaweh decides to become her knight. When angels attack the castle, Hyaweh and Priecia unleash the true power of the Ala-Gladius and become a giant glowing angel that defeats the army.

==== Theme songs ====
Opening theme
"Soshite Boku wa..." by Yui Sakakibara
Ending theme
"Opera Fantasia" by momo-i

== See also ==
- Prism Heart
