= Dragonar Academy =

Japanese light novel series and its adaptations

- Cover of the first light novel volume featuring Eco

星刻の竜騎士 (Seikoku no Doraguna)
- Genre: Fantasy, Romantic comedy, Harem
- Light novel
- Written by: Shiki Mizuchi
- Illustrated by: Kohada Shimesaba
- Published by: Media Factory
- Imprint: MF Bunko J
- Original run: June 25, 2010 – November 25, 2015
- Volumes: 20
- Manga
- Written by: Shiki Mizuchi
- Illustrated by: Ran
- Published by: Media Factory
- English publisher: NA: Seven Seas Entertainment
- Imprint: Alive Comics
- Magazine: Monthly Comic Alive
- Original run: October 22, 2011 – December 23, 2016
- Volumes: 13
- Anime television series
- Directed by: Shunsuke Tada; Tomoyuki Kurokawa
- Produced by: Ryoji Maru
- Written by: Noboru Kimura
- Music by: Takasugu Wakabayashi
- Studio: C-Station
- Licensed by: Crunchyroll
- Original network: AT-X, Tokyo MX, MBS, TVA, BS11
- Original run: April 5, 2014 – June 21, 2014
- Episodes: 12
- icon

Dragonar Academy (Japanese: 星刻(せいこく)の竜騎士(ドラグナー), Hepburn: Seikoku no Doragunā; lit. "Star-Marked Dragonar") is a Japanese light novel series written by Shiki Mizuchi, illustrated by Kohada Shimesaba, and published by Media Factory under the MF Bunko J imprint. The first volume was released on June 25, 2010, with a total of 20 volumes available in Japan so far. A manga adaptation by the illustrator, Ran, began serialization in Monthly Comic Alive during its June 2011 issue. It was one of five MF Bunko J light novel anime adaptations announced at Media Factory's Summer School Festival event on July 28, 2013. It has been licensed for North America by Funimation.

== Plot ==
On the continent of Arc Strada, civilians called Breeders raise and train their Pars (スティード; lit. 'steed'), dragons bonded to Breeders via a magical link called the Astral Flow. Races of dragons are born from Breeders who are deemed worthy and marked with a Seikoku (星刻; lit. 'Star Brand') at a young age by the Mother Dragon at the Orphan Rite. Breeders may eventually achieve the rank of nobility by helping their Par become a Maestro, or Holy Dragon.

Learning to ride and tame dragons comes easily to most students at Ansarivan Dragonar Academy—except for Ash Blake, a first-year student who is known by his classmates as the "problem child". Despite Ash having an unusually large seikoku that marks him as a future dragon master, his Par had never appeared, until now. While challenging a fellow student, Princess Silvia Lautreamont, to a dragon race, Ash's dragon appears, but in a form different than any dragon ever seen before—a beautiful girl. Ash names her "Eco" and soon discovers that this new dragon has attitude to spare, as she promptly informs him that she is the master, and he, her servant. Ash's problems with dragon riding have only just begun.

== Characters ==
=== Main characters ===
Ash Blake (アッシュ・ブレイク, Asshu Bureiku)
Voiced by: Kōji Takahashi (Drama CD/Anime) (Japanese); Aaron Dismuke (English)
A 16-year-old student at the academy whose dragon Par hasn't awakened. He is known as a problem child due to his tendency to react violently to any perceived insult to his yet-to-be-born dragon. Despite his poor reputation, he has an unusual talent—a phenomenon called Chalice that makes him the only human (aside from his sister, Linda) able to ride other people's dragons. As a child he had no interest in becoming a Breeder, but he met Silvia Lautreamont—who was determined to be a Breeder—by chance during the Orphan Rite and assisted her in finding the Mother Dragon. After finding the Mother Dragon, he is chosen to become a Breeder; not Silvia. He was given the dragon Par (later named Eco) by the Mother Dragon who was aware of his ability to ride any dragon.
After saving the town during the Necromancia incident, he is deified as the Arch-bearing "Silver Knight", which corresponds to a noble rank. He is later knighted by Paladin Oswald, granting him the title Dragona shortly after accepting the position of student council general affairs. He is also called the Knight of Avalon due to him being Eco's master. In his second year, he takes the student council president position where he becomes the founder of The Independent Order of the Avalon Knights.

Eco (エーコ, Ēko)
Voiced by: Mariya Ise (Drama CD/Anime) (Japanese); Lara Woodhull (English)
Eco is a special dragon Par, who takes the form of a human girl. Although she develops a fondness for Ash, she treats him as though he was her servant, much to his annoyance. Eco is fully aware that Ash is her master and that she is the "pet" (as she describes herself), but she doesn't want to admit it because of her pride. She also believes that if she submits that she will be nothing but a "tamed pet" and will never be loved as anything more than just a pet, which is not the kind of love she wants from Ash. Eco accesses Dragweiss, a place where she can gathers the ability to give Ash a magical suit of armor known as an Ark and when she does, they also receive an Ark Weapon infused with elemental power.
She is later revealed to be the Imperial Princess of the Emperor's Family of Avalon's Holy Dragons, and her full name is Eco Aurora-Christa Pendragon Lena Anherusu-Ilya Roransu Liliane-Muriel-Octavia-Robertine de la Rosa Resuperansu van de Compostela Avalon. According to the Mother Dragon, Eco is both human and dragon. This was arranged in order for her to breed with Ash and save the dragon race from extinction.

Silvia Lautreamont (シルヴィア・ロートレアモン, Shiruvia Rōtoreamon)
Voiced by: Ayane Sakura (Drama CD/Anime) (Japanese); Elizabeth Parker (English)
Fourth princess of the Lautreamont Knight Family and a Dragonar. Her Par is a white Maestro Dragon named Lancelot. It is revealed that she wasn't supposed to become a Dragonar, but she did when Ash yielded Lancelot to her when the two of them met as children during the Orphan Rite. Neither of them remember meeting nor the subsequent events. Silvia soon joins the student council with Ash and is in charge of public morals. She is completely terrified of her older sister, Veronica, but overcomes her fears when Veronica recognizes her skills. Despite Silvia being the 4th child of the King, her older siblings are either not interested in politics, or have gone missing, which has left her as heir-presumptive to the throne.
During their second visit to Albion Forest to search for the Mother Dragon as part of an examination, Silvia and Ash regain their lost memories. Silvia finally realizes the magnitude of everything that Ash has done for her, such as giving up Lancelot and getting injured in the process, and so she declares her love for him and kisses him, causing her to forever quarrel with Eco, and will stop at nothing to have Ash be engaged to her. In later volumes, Silvia also becomes an Arch Dragonar and vice president of the academy.

=== Ansarivan Dragon Riding Academy ===
Rebecca Randall (レベッカ・ランドール, Rebekka Randōru)
Voiced by: Marina Inoue (Drama CD/Anime) (Japanese); Alexis Tipton (English)
Third-year student and student council president. Her dragon Par is a Maestro named Cú Chulainn. She is a powerful Arch Dragonar armor-user capable of summoning an unstoppable spear named Gae Bulg. She likes teasing Ash to make the other girls who like him jealous. However, she may have feelings for Ash as well. When she graduates from the academy, she leaves the position of student council president to Ash.
Raymond Kirkland (レイモン・カークランド, Reimon Kākurando)
Voiced by: Tomoaki Maeno (Drama CD/Anime) (Japanese); Austin Tindle (English)
Ash's friend and a self-proclaimed "ladies' man". His Par is an Earth Dragon named Brigid. He, Ash, and Maximilian have known each other for a long time and were once roommates when they were younger. Raymond is one of the very few students outside the student council to know about Ash's identity as the famous Silver Knight who had saved the town from a Necromantia dragon. In his second year, he takes the position of general affairs while Ash is promoted to student council president and has a seat on the Order of the Avalon Knights.
Jessica Valentine (ジェシカ・ヴァレンタイン, Jeshika Varentain)
Voiced by: Kana Hanazawa (Anime) (Japanese); Skyler McIntosh (English)
Rebecca's childhood friend who sees her as her rival. Although Jessica acts like she's from nobility, the truth is the Valentine family have been servants of the Randall family for generations, and Rebecca threatens to expose her whenever she causes trouble. She was the president of the Silver Knight Fan Club, and when she finds out that the Silver Knight is Ash, she wishes to bear his children in order to gain nobility. To cover it up, Rebecca has her resign as president of the fan club and join the student council. Her Par is a Hydra named Rhiannon.
Lukka Saarinen (ルッカ・サーリネン, Rukka Sārinen)
Voiced by: Asuka Ōgame (Anime) (Japanese); Bryn Apprill (English)
The student council secretary. An Eckbald or elf of the forest, Lukka is the youngest person to ever become a Dragonar. Her Par is a Maestro Dragon named Gawain. After an accident where she fell off Gawain, she developed a fear of riding her dragon. In addition, Gawain has since refused to let her ride due to his concern for his rider. However, Lukka is eventually able to overcome her fear with Ash's help. She then becomes attached to him and more open to others. As an Eckbaldian Dragonar, she practices the Dragon Dance, a battle style that wins the battle against the Necromantia at the Willingham Mausoleum.
Maximillian Russell (マクシミリアン・ラッセル, Makushimirian Rasseru)
Voiced by: Genki Muro (Drama CD/Anime) (Japanese); Derick Snow (English)
The student council treasurer. Maximillian's Par is a Wyvern named Airanlot. He is known to be a clean freak and does not tolerate any kind of untidiness. He, Ash, and Raymond have known each other for a long time and were once roommates in their earlier school years.
Oscar Brailsford (オスカー・ブレイスフォード, Osukā Bureisufōdo)
The student council vice president who is a girl masquerading as a boy and is often absent from school lectures and activities. According to Rebecca, Oscar's skills as a Dragonar are exceptional. Likewise, Oscar wishes to make Rebecca her 'first wife'. Oscar is the daughter of the king of Chevron. After Oscar's mother's death, the king took Oscar on as a son and hid her true gender. She became the first Breeder of the land of Chevron with her Par Tristan and became an exchange student at the academy. She has an eye-patch maid named Celestine. When they were introduced, Oscar and Ash were initially on bad terms because Oscar forcibly took Eco for strength to obtain her throne.
Linda Blake (リンダ・ブレイク, Rinda Bureiku)
Ash's younger sister. Like her older brother Ash, Linda is able to ride any dragon. Her Par, Percival is the reincarnation of the Mother Dragon. Originally, Eco was intended to be Linda's Par but instead was given to Ash because he had given Lancelot to Silvia. To compensate, Linda is given a holy dragon since both she and Ash share the Chalice phenomena and have greater potential to be Breeders.

=== Lautreamont Knight Country ===
==== Lautreamont Royal Family ====
Oswald Lautreamont (オズワルド・ロートレアモン, Ozuwarudo Rōtoreamon)
Voiced by: Takaya Hashi (Anime) (Japanese); Barry Yandell (English)
The head of the Lautreamont family and the current ruler of the country, called the Paladin. He is a widower and a very cheerful man who dotes on his children but is often scolded by Silvia, which he seems to enjoy—it reminds him of Silvia's late mother Elizabeth. He asks to meet Ash at the continental congress and grants Ash knighthood but warns him not to pursue a relationship with Silvia. The Paladin was unable to bear seeing his only son Julius killed for the crime of murdering his dragon, and so he banished Julius instead without realizing the reasons behind his son's actions.
Veronica Lautreamont (ヴェロニカ・ロートレアモン, Veronika Rōtoreamon)
Voiced by: Aya Endo (Anime) (Japanese); Martha Harms (English)
First princess of the Lautreamont family and the eldest of the four sisters. Nicknamed the Iron Blood Valkyrie, Veronica always wears her armor except while bathing or sleeping. Silvia is terrified of her due to the harsh training Veronica subjected her to when she was little. Although Veronica was not selected as a Breeder, she decided to train her body and hone her swordsmanship to compensate for the lack. Despite her harsh treatment of Silvia, she loves her sister dearly and, according to Julius, even has pictures of Silvia and a Silvia doll in her room. She apparently does not respect her father and wishes for Silvia to be the next Paladin, the country's ruler, telling her to "try to make me kneel before you".
Julius Lautreamont (ジュリアス・ロートレアモン, Juriasu Rōtoreamon)
Voiced by: Takehito Koyasu (Anime) (Japanese); David Trosko (English)
The only son of the Lautreamont family. He was supposedly executed for the charge of slaughtering his own dragon but was secretly spared and exiled by Oswald instead. The reason he killed his dragon was because he realized that his dragon, Mordred, was the reincarnation of an evil dragon. Unfortunately, this caused Mordred's spirit to possess him, thus creating the persona of Milgauss. He was later freed when Mordred chose to possess Eco instead.
Cassandra Lautreamont (カサンドラ・ロートレアモン, Kasandora Rōtoreamon)
Second daughter of the Lautreamont family, currently missing.
Mirabel Lautreamont (ミラベル・ロートレアモン, Miraberu Rōtoreamon)
Third daughter of the Lautreamont family. She took the position as Ansarivan Dragon Riding Academy's principal after the previous principal retired. She has a cold but calm demeanor and is usually seen drinking tea even in the middle ceremonies or meetings. According to Silvia, she is a scholar who is studying and doing research abroad. She became Ansarivan's principal on Veronica's orders to watch over Eco, but she admits that she came for another reason and that she does not care for Veronica's orders. According to Ash, she does not seem to respect Veronica at all, having referred to her eldest sister a "muscle freak".

==== Citizens ====
Angela Cornwell (アンジェラ・コーンウェル, Anjera Kōnweru)
Voiced by: Haruhi Terada (Drama CD/Anime) (Japanese); Jennifer Green (English)
An expert in the field of dragons. She kidnapped Eco and tried to vivisect her, but was stopped by Ash. Afterwards, so that she can observe Ash and Eco, she becomes the new homeroom teacher of Ash's class, much to the surprise of Ash and Silvia and the delight of all the other male students. She and Julius knew each other before his supposed execution, and she is hinted to have feelings for him. Because of this, she is the first person to realize Milgaus's true identity.
Cosette Shelley (コゼット・シェリー, Kosetto Sherī)
Voiced by: Yoshiko Ikuta (Drama CD/Anime) (Japanese); Felecia Angelle (English)
Silvia's loyal personal maid. Cosette is very cunning, a master of disguise and given to teasing Silvia and Ash. She is one of the few people who does not fear Veronica, who has asked her to leave Silvia's service and serve her instead on multiple occasions.
Primrose Shelley (プリムローズ・シェリー, Purimurōzu Sherī)
Voiced by: Ai Kakuma (Anime) (Japanese); Morgan Garrett (English)
Cosette's older sister and Veronica's personal maid. Unlike her sister, Primrose is rather clumsy and carefree and is known for her large bust.
Avdocha Kiltzkaya (アヴドーチャ・キルツカヤ, Avudōcha Kirutsukaya)
Voiced by: Yū Kobayashi (Anime) (Japanese); Jad Saxton (English)
A former terrorist of the Tantalos tribe who now works for Veronica as an undercover agent. Avdocha decided to help Veronica so that she could find her long-lost sister, Shamara.
Glenn McGuire (グレン・マクガイア, Guren Makugaia)
Voiced by: Kazuma Horie (Anime) (Japanese); Will Short (English)
A knight in Veronica's service. He was Julius Lautreamont's best friend until Julius's execution, which caused him to become a serious and nearly emotionless person. He is also an Arch Dragonar armor user.
Orletta Blanc (オルエッタ・ブラン, Oruetta Buran)
Voiced by: Yūka Aisaka (Anime) (Japanese); Leah Clark (English)
Royal postman who rides a wyvern.

=== Zepharos Empire ===
Klaus Viderhausen (クラウス・ヴィターハウゼン, Kurausu Vitāhauzen)
Voiced by: Eiji Miyashita (Anime) (Japanese); Robert McCollum (English)
A nobleman sent to represent the Zepharos Empire in the continental congress. He took Julius in after he found him wandering after Julius lost his memories and became possessed by Mordred.
Milgaus (ミルガウス, Mirugausu)
Voiced by: Takehito Koyasu (Drama CD/Anime) (Japanese); David Trosko (English)
A masked man working for the Zepharos Empire. Milgaus is capable of summoning a Necromancer Dragon, a resurrected corpse of a dragon. He is later revealed to be Prince Julius, who was thought to have been executed many years ago but was in fact secretly spared by the Paladin and exiled. He was possessed by the spirit of the dark dragon king Mordred until Mordred tried to gain control of the Dragweiss.
Anya (アーニャ, Ānya) / Shamara Kiltzkaya (シャマラ・キルツカヤ, Shamara Kirutsukaya)
Voiced by: Asami Shimoda (Drama CD/Anime) (Japanese); Sarah Wiedenheft (English)
An assassin and head of the Tantalos tribe who works for Milgaus and is very dedicated to him. After being saved by Ash, Anya develops an interest in him. She is later revealed to be Avdocha's long lost sister.

=== Dragons ===
Navi (ナヴィー, Navī)
Voiced by: Yui Sakakibara (Drama CD/Anime) (Japanese); Monica Rial (English)
Navi is the overseer of the Dragon Workshop and has access to all of the knowledge of past dragons. She appears as an older version of Eco. She is later revealed to be the incarnation of the Dragweiss, the repository of all dragon knowledge. Once Eco matures, she will absorb Navi, thus gaining access to the full knowledge, wisdom, and power of the Dragweiss. By doing so, she will direct the future of the dragon race. According to Navi, Navi's current appearance is what Eco will look like when the latter grows up. Navi thinks it would be fine if Ash ended up marrying both Silvia and Eco.
Mordred (モルドレッド, Morudoreddo)
Voiced by: Takaya Kuroda (Anime) (Japanese); Chris Rager (English)
Mordred was the dragon Par of Prince Julius Lautreamont. As his dragon grew older, Julius discovered that Mordred had a malevolent aspect to his personality that was born from his ancestral memory as a descendant of the dark kingdom of Nehalennia and that it was slowly taking him over. To that end, Mordred conspired with the prince to kill himself, hoping that it would also kill his evil side.
Unfortunately, Mordred's evil side was able to escape the death of its body and possess Julius. When the Paladin spared Julius's life, he unwittingly allowed Mordred to survive as well. Mordred later tries to possess Eco in order to fully revive himself, but Navi resists his attack, which allows Ash and Eco to defeat and forcefully expel him. His spirit flees and is last seen flying to the east. In the manga series, Mordred is later revealed to be female who also has a humanoid form that resembles an evil version of Eco with heterochromiatic eyes and navy blue hair along with a set of ark based on her dragon form.
Nuada (ヌァザ, Nwaza)
A legendary dragon, Nuada was resurrected by Milgaus to fight Ash and his friends. According to his legend, he was the Par of a sick girl. Believing his master was about to die, Nuada cut off his Astral Flow with her. Astral Flow is the link that allows a dragon to absorb Astral—the magical energy required by all things to survive but no longer produced by extremely magical races like dragons and elves—from its rider. Nuada left for the Willingham Mausoleum, where he died alone, not realizing his master had recovered.
Mother Dragon (マザー・ドラゴン, Mazā Doragon)
Voiced by: Fumi Hirano (Anime) (Japanese); Linda Leonard (English)
The Mother Dragon is an unseen presence in the world. Despite being called the Mother Dragon, she claims that she is not actually the mother of dragons, but merely a system that distributes dragons to deserving Breeders. The Mother Dragon is a large and powerful dragon, and unlike other dragons, she is able to survive without a partner. Only people with the ability to become Breeders are able to see her, and she chooses who and who will not become Breeders during the Orphan Rite. She was created by a wise dragon in order to save their kind after an accident took away the ability of magical races such as dragons and elves to produce Astral, which brought the dragon race to the brink of extinction. Only recently has the Mother Dragon realized that she is dying. She christens a dragon with a human form (Eco) so that Eco can bear children with a human and save the dragon race.

== Media ==
=== Light novels ===
Dragonar Academy began as a light novel series written by Shiki Mizuchi with illustrations by Kohada Shimesaba, published by Media Factory under their MF Bunko J imprint. The first volume was released in Japan on June 25, 2010, and the last on November 25, 2015, with a total of 20 volumes published.

=== Drama CD ===
A CD drama was released by Media Factory on October 24, 2012. The drama is split into two episodes: "Eco the Dragon Girl" (エーコは竜の娘, Ēco wa Ryū no Musume) and "The Streets of Ansarivan" (アンサリヴァンの市街区, Ansarivan no Shigai-ku). The opening theme is "Astral Flow" by Haruka Shimotsuki, and a short version of the song was featured as a bonus track. The full song was later featured in Uta J (うたJ; lit. Song J), Media Factory's album commemorating MF Bunko J's tenth anniversary, released on August 29, 2012.

=== Manga ===
A manga adaptation illustrated by Ran began serialization in the June 2011 issue of Monthly Comic Alive (released on April 27, 2011). The first bound volume was released by Media Factory on October 22, 2011, with a total of thirteen volumes published under their Alive Comics imprint. The manga is licensed in North America by Seven Seas Entertainment under the title Dragonar Academy. In July 2020, the manga became one of seven titles to be removed from Books Kinokuniya in Australia for claims of promoting child pornography.

=== Anime ===
An anime television series aired from April 5 to June 21, 2014, on AT-X and at later dates on Tokyo MX, MBS, TVA, and BS11. The anime series is animated by C-Station and directed by Shunsuke Tada. The opening theme is "Seiken Nante Iranai" (聖剣なんていらない, I Don't Need a Holy Sword) by Yui Sakakibara while the ending theme is MOST Ijō no 'MOSTEST' (MOST以上の"MOSTEST", A "Mostest" More Than Most) by Mariya Ise, Ayane Sakura, and Marina Inoue under their character names. The series adapts the first four volumes of the light novels. The series is licensed by Funimation in North America and aired on their TV station.

No.	Title	Original release date
1	"A Boy & His Dragon"; Transliteration: "Shōnen to Ryū" (Japanese: 少年と竜)	April 5, 2014
When the Princess Silvia insults him, Ash accepts her challenge to race her to prove her wrong. Partway in the race, Ash gets ambushed by Milgaus and Anya of the Zepharos Empire. When Anya nearly falls into a chasm, Ash saves her. Falling in himself, he is saved when his Pal awakens.
2	"Ties That Bind: The Astral Flow"; Transliteration: "Futari no Kizuna Asutoraru Furō" (Japanese: 二人の絆・星精路（アストラル・フロウ）)	April 12, 2014
Ash's Pal is born and is named Eco by him...and she is not at all what he expects. Later, while out shopping with Eco, she is kidnapped by Angela Cornwell and rescued by Ash and Princess Silvia.
3	"Riot in the Streets"; Transliteration: "Shigai Dōran" (Japanese: 市街動乱)	April 19, 2014
A massive dragon attacks the town and its up to the student council members to help out. While fighting it, Eco is captured by this dragon. Eco is sent to a workshop which is used to make Arcs. Then she meets a person named Navi. Navi explains the situation and how Eco can help it by creating an Arc.
4	"Iron Blood Valkyrie"; Transliteration: "Airan Buraddo Varukirī" (Japanese: 鉄血戦乙女（アイアンブラッドヴァルキリー）)	April 26, 2014
After having defeated the dragon, a fan club is set up by some students looking for the identity of the Silver Knight that defeated the dragon. Ash must keep his identity as the Silver Knight secret. Meanwhile, Silvia's sister Veronica, the First Princess, decides to visit her little sister at the academy.
5	"Ice Blue Princess"; Transliteration: "Aisu Burū Purinsesu" (Japanese: 蒼氷姫君（アイスブループリンセス）)	May 3, 2014
After Veronica humiliates Silvia in public, she tells her of plans to engage her to a knight.
6	"Blue Brionac"; Transliteration: "Ao no Buryūnaku" (Japanese: 青の聖騎銃（ブリューナク）)	May 10, 2014
Veronica orders Silvia to pray for forgiveness for her weakness at the church. While there, the church is taken over by a group of bandits led by the guerrilla Avdocha Kiltzkaya, who threatens to bomb the church with everyone in it. Ash goes in to negotiate with her while Veronica initiates her plan to save everyone, even though initially she planned to let Avdocha Kiltzkaya blow up the church. This ultimately results in Silvia and the citizens being saved.
7	"Lucca Sarlinen"; Transliteration: "Rukka Sārinen" (Japanese: ルッカ・サーリネン)	May 17, 2014
After Ash is chosen to go to a training camp, they find out about the last student council member named Lucca, who has a greater reputation than that of the student council president. She has a problem with her Dragon Gawain, and it's up to the student council members as friends to help her.
8	"Moonlit Roar"; Transliteration: "Gekka no Hōkō" (Japanese: 月下の咆哮)	May 24, 2014
After arriving at the training camp, the student council continues their efforts to talk to Gawain. After managing to get on Gawain's back, Ash is knocked out and speaks with Gawain in the Highdragon Workshop. While there, Ash finds out that the reason Gawain will not let Lucca ride him is because the two had an accident recently, and he does not want to put her in danger like he did before.
9	"Dragon Dance"; Transliteration: "Kiryū Enbu" (Japanese: 騎竜演舞)	May 31, 2014
After Gawain goes missing, it is up to Ash, Silvia and Eco to help Lucca find him. Meanwhile, the camp is attacked by a horde of Necromancia. Students and staff fight them off. The group finds Gawain, but Milgauss is there with a large Necromancia Dragon. The group defeats him and the dragon. They kill the Necromancia dragons at the school and rescue Gawain.
10	"Assembly in Fontaine"; Transliteration: "Shūketsu no Miyako Fontīn" (Japanese: 集結の都、フォンティーン)	June 7, 2014
Silvia, Ash, and Eco are invited to the capital by Silvia's father so he can meet them. Upon reaching the capital, Silvia meets up with her father while Ash and Eco explore the city. Once Ash meets Silvia's father, he appoints him as a Dragonar. Meanwhile, an evil group plots behind the scenes and waits to start its plan to kidnap Eco and awaken her dragon form.
11	"Yggdrasil Rising"; Transliteration: "Yugudorashiru Kidō" (Japanese: ユグドラシル起動)	June 14, 2014
After realizing that she will never be with Ash, Eco runs off. While outside and away from everyone, Eco is kidnapped by the evil group. While Silvia and Ash search for her, they find out she was abducted and go to rescue her.
12	"The Star-Branded Dragonar"; Transliteration: "Seikoku no Doragunā" (Japanese: 星刻の竜騎士（ドラグナー）)	June 21, 2014
The evil group complete their plan and force Eco into her dragon form. Eco is then possessed by the spirit who formally resided in Silvia's brother's body. Eco loses control of her body and wreaks havoc on the city. This causes Ash to jump into action. Venturing into Eco's mind, Ash fights and defeats the spirit, returning Eco to her human form and saving the city.
