= Kanokon =

2005 light novel series

- English cover of the first light novel featuring Kouta Oyamada and Chizuru Minamoto.

かのこん
- Genre: Romantic comedy, supernatural
- Light novel
- Written by: Katsumi Nishino
- Illustrated by: Koin
- Published by: Media Factory
- English publisher: NA: Seven Seas Entertainment (cancelled)
- Imprint: MF Bunko J
- Original run: October 31, 2005 – December 24, 2010
- Volumes: 15
- Manga
- Written by: Katsumi Nishino
- Illustrated by: Rin Yamaki
- Published by: Media Factory
- English publisher: NA: Seven Seas Entertainment
- Imprint: Alive Comics
- Magazine: Monthly Comic Alive
- Original run: August 2006 – August 2010
- Volumes: 9
- Anime television series

Kanokon: The Girl Who Cried Fox
- Directed by: Atsushi Ōtsuki
- Written by: Masashi Suzuki
- Music by: Tsuyoshi Ito
- Studio: Xebec
- Licensed by: NA: Media Blasters
- Original network: AT-X
- Original run: April 5, 2008 – June 21, 2008
- Episodes: 12
- Video game

Kanokon Esuii
- Developer: 5pb.
- Publisher: 5pb.
- Genre: Visual novel
- Platform: PlayStation 2
- Released: July 31, 2008
- Original video animation

Kanokon: Manatsu no Daishanikusai
- Directed by: Atsushi Ōtsuki
- Written by: Masashi Suzuki
- Music by: Tsuyoshi Ito
- Studio: Xebec
- Licensed by: NA: Media Blasters
- Released: October 4, 2009 – October 10, 2009
- Episodes: 2
- icon

Kanokon (かのこん) (Note: Kanokon is an abbreviation of Kanojo wa Kon, to Kawaiku Seki o Shite (彼女はこん、とかわいく咳をして; "Her Yelps Are Cute Coughs").) is a Japanese light novel series by Katsumi Nishino, with illustrations by Koin. The first novel was released by Media Factory on October 31, 2005, under its MF Bunko J imprint, and it published 15 volumes until December 24, 2010. A manga adaptation illustrated by Rin Yamaki was serialized in Media Factory's seinen manga magazine Monthly Comic Alive between the August 2006 and August 2010 issues. A drama CD was produced by Media Factory and released on March 28, 2007. A twelve-episode anime adaptation produced by Xebec aired in Japan between April and June 2008 on AT-X, and has been licensed by Media Blasters for release in North America. A two-part OVA sequel aired on AT-X in October 2009. A visual novel named Kanokon Esuii developed by 5pb. was released for the PlayStation 2 on July 31, 2008.

== Plot ==
Kanokon's story revolves around Kouta Oyamada, an extremely innocent young first-year high school student who moves from the country to the city and thus transfers to Kunpō High School. On his first day at his new school, he meets a beautiful second-year female student named Chizuru Minamoto. Chizuru asks him to meet her alone in the music room. When he arrives, she tells him that she is in love with him and accidentally reveals to him that she is in fact a fox spirit. Chizuru constantly and openly flirts with Kouta, even in front of others, embarrassing him greatly. Soon after the story begins, a wolf spirit named Nozomu Ezomori transfers into Kouta's school and class. From day one, she is all over Kouta, serving to embarrass him more and causing Chizuru to become annoyed at her new competition for Kouta's affection.

== Characters ==
=== Main characters ===
Kouta Oyamada (小山田 耕太, Oyamada Kōta)
Voiced by: Mamiko Noto (Japanese); Mona Marshall (English)
Kouta is the protagonist of the story. Since he's been orphaned following the loss of his deceased parents; he used to live with his grandfather before moving from the countryside to the city for his first year of high school, and on his first day of school discovers that Chizuru Minamoto a second-year high school girl is actually a kitsune. To complicate matters, she falls in love with and vigorously pursues him committing "disgraceful acts" with him in public-(sometimes in front of other people). Because of this, Kouta has had the nickname "Great Erotic King" (エロス大王, Erosu DaiŌ; "King of Eros" in the English anime) placed upon him by other students in the school. He is initially reluctant to engage in the "intimate" acts Chizuru desires, but does so later on in the series citing her inspiration. Kouta's true bond with Chizuru is shown when they fuse into a powerful being that gives Kouta black fox ears with tails. According to Chizuru's brother Tayura, this possession can only happen if a human and a yōkai share a deep emotional bond with each other.

Chizuru Minamoto (源 千鶴, Minamoto Chizuru)
Voiced by: Ayako Kawasumi (Japanese); Dorothy Elias-Fahn (English)
Chizuru is second-year female student at Kouta's school. On the outside she appears to be a well endowed teenage girl, but she is in fact a powerful kitsune. When she changes form, her black hair turns blonde, and she gains fox ears and a tail. While it is implied by her brother Tayura that she is 400 years old, it is later revealed that her age may be in the thousands. She has no recollection of her past from before she met her foster mother Tamamo, but over time remembers some things she had forgotten about herself. From the start of the series she has fallen in love with Kouta, and is constantly hanging around him. She very much wants to enter into a "relationship of sin" with him and is very forthright in her almost constant sexual suggestions and actions.

Nozomu Ezomori (犹守 望, Ezomori Nozomu)
Voiced by: Miyū Takeuchi (Japanese); May Kao (English)
Nozomu is a first-year female transfer student at Kouta's school. She has short light ash blonde hair and is in fact a 200-year-old wolf spirit who lives by herself in an expensive but empty penthouse apartment, where she always sleeps naked on the floor. She has an older brother named Saku who took her in, but after Saku attacks Kouta she decides to go against her brother by following her own path. Despite her seemingly detached and emotionless manner, she falls in love with Kouta at first sight and is thus Chizuru's rival for Kouta's affections. She frequently insults Chizuru by calling her a "Horny Beast", saying that Chizuru "smells obscene" or that her breasts are flabby.

=== Supporting characters ===
Tayura Minamoto (源 たゆら, Minamoto Tayura)
Voiced by: Toshiyuki Toyonaga (Japanese); Ethan Murray (English)
Tayura is Chizuru's younger brother and Kouta's classmate. Like his sister, he is also a fox spirit but was adopted into her family. He frequently teases Chizuru about her age which results in her getting visibly annoyed. Initially Tayura was jealous of the relationship between his sister and Kouta prompting Chizuru to say that he is suffering from a sister complex. He ends up falling in love with Akane but whenever he tries to get closer to her, he is given the cold shoulder. He has stated that he is okay with her coldness, and the two gradually warm up.

Akane Asahina (朝比奈 あかね, Asahina Akane)
Voiced by: Chiwa Saitō (Japanese); Camilla Debry (English)
Akane is the bespectacled class representative of Kouta's class. Due to her position as class representative she has a high sense of regulations, and therefore disagrees with how ardently Chizuru pursues Kouta while at school. She is on good terms with Kouta, and worries about his relationship with Chizuru citing her as a bad example.

Ren Nanao (七々尾 蓮, Nanao Ren) and Ai Nanao (七々尾 藍, Nanao Ai)
(Ren) Voiced by: Mai Kadowaki
(Ai) Voiced by: Tamaki Nakanishi
Ren and Ai are twin sisters who are first-year students at Kouta's school. The girls are nearly identical except for their slightly different hair styles. They are spirit hunters who live at a poor temple and are frequently seen doing things that homeless people would do; they make stew out of trash and roadside weeds or eat discarded bread crusts. They use chains when attacking and are also seen in the anime ineffectively using explosives.

Omi Kiriyama (桐山 臣, Kiriyama Omi)
Voiced by: Takashi Kondō (Japanese); Bryce Papenbrook (English)
Omi is a second year student at Kouta's school who is in fact a sickle weasel with the power to control the wind. Omi was once the bitter enemy of the Minamoto siblings. He hates the friendship between Kouta and his friends and does not speak much. In the anime, he hurts Kouta, who took a blow meant for Chizuru. Since he is not permitted to harm humans, this act has serious consequences for him. He likes Mio.

Mio Osakabe (長ヶ部 澪, Osakabe Mio)
Voiced by: Yui Itsuki (drama CD), Miyu Matsuki (Japanese); Elivia Gaitan (English)
Mio is a second year student with a shy nature who hangs around with Omi. Due to her short stature, she is often mistaken for a grade school student and has even received multiple confessions from grade school students. She is in fact a half frog spirit and can heal quickly. While she did not have a name originally, Omi named her from a combination of his own given name and his home town's name. She likes Omi but becomes incredibly embarrassed when anyone refers to her relationship with him.

Ryuusei Kumada (熊田 流星, Kumada Ryūsei)
Voiced by: Kenji Nomura (drama CD), Kenta Miyake (Japanese); Andres Alexis (English)
Ryusei is a third-year student who has a distinct cross-wound over his left eye and was the leader of the school delinquents before Omi took over. He is a bear spirit. In the fourth volume, he graduates from high school, but soon changes his name to Suisei Kumada (熊田 彗星, Kumada Suisei) and restarts high school as a first-year student.

Yuuki Sasamori (佐々森 ユウキ, Sasamori Yūki)
Voiced by: Saori Seto (Japanese); Lara Cody (English)
Yuuki's is best friends with Kiriko, and the two are classmates of Kouta whom she refers to as the "Letch King". Unlike her friend she is shown to have a more wild side. She is also friends with Akane whom she teases for having a dirty mind. Yuuki is on the student body often reflecting their stance on things.

Kiriko Takana (高菜 キリコ, Takana Kiriko)
Voiced by: Ui Miyazaki (drama CD)
Kiriko is best friends with Yuuki whom she refers to as "Yooks". Kiriko comes from a well off family, and has expensive gadgets which she uses a lot. She dislikes Kouta for being too perverted, and thinks all men in general are "beasts". Kiriko gets top marks in school even though she does not study.

=== Kudzu Leaf ===
Iku Sahara (砂原 幾, Sahara Iku)
Voiced by: Noriko Shitaya (Japanese); Karen Strassman (English)
Iku is a social studies teacher and is Kouta's homeroom teacher. She is possessed by a powerful yōkai named Okata (御方) who is head of the Sahara family, and leader of Kudzu Leaf. Okata is in charge of the school Kouta attends, and oversees the spirits at school. Okata's powers in both the manga and anime adaptations is shown to be the manipulation of sand. She is shown to be able to conceal people by using it as well as the ability to set up magical barriers. In the anime adaptation, it is shown that she can also put the students to sleep in the school when dangerous situations come along. The true form Okata who possesses Iku is that of an old woman who has survived for thousands of years.

Minori Mitama (三珠 美乃里, Mitama Minori)
Voiced by: Kumiko Nishihara
Minori is the main antagonist of the story and refers to herself as Kouta's younger sister. Her servant is a yōkai named Nue (鵺). As her name indicated, she is a nue, but also has a pair of raven wings for flight.

Saku Ezomori (犹守 朔, Ezomori Saku)
Voiced by: Yūto Kazama (Japanese); Grant George (English)
Saku is Nozomu's older brother. Like his sister, he is a wolf spirit. He usually drives a motorcycle around town and he is in love with Chizuru.

Takao Yatsuka (八束 たかお, Yatsuka Takao)
Voiced by: Takashi Matsuyama (Japanese); Dan Woren (English)
Takao is the gym teacher at Kouta's school who has a scary face. Like Iku, he too oversees the spirits at school. He is very wise and gets along with Yukihana.

=== Yōkai and gods ===
Tamamo (玉藻)
Voiced by: Naomi Shindō (Japanese); Mari Devon (English)
Tamamo is Tamamo-no-Mae, a powerful nine-tailed fox spirit and Chizuru's mother, though they are not blood related. She is the manager of Tama no Yu (玉ノ湯) which is a hot spring hotel deep in the snowy mountains. When business is slow, she manages a beachside restaurant named Tama no Ya (Tama's shop). Yukihana helps her run the hotel, and the shop. She gets along well with Kouta, though she sometimes meddles in his relationship with Chizuru. She fell in love with Yasunari Abe, the hero from the children's book "The Legend of the Nine-tailed Fox". Rather than killing her as the story implies, he takes her for his bride. As such, she encourages Kouta's relationship with her daughter even though he is a human. She also knows about Yamata no Orochi, the dragon that was sleeping inside of Chizuru.

Yukihana (雪花) / Hanadai Yukino (雪野 花代, Yukino Hanadai)
Voiced by: Risa Hayamizu (Japanese); Tara Platt (English)
Yukihana is a yuki-onna and a ninja who works under Tamamo at the Tama no Yu hot springs resort, and at her beachside restaurant Tama no Ya. She later becomes a teacher for the handicapped at Kouta's school. While working as a teacher, she goes by the alias Hanadai Yukino. If anyone calls her using the name Yukihana, she says that she is not that person. She can manipulate snow and wind to create blizzards. The name Yukihana means "snowflake", Yuki being the Japanese word for snow.

Yamata no Orochi (八岐の大蛇)
In the manga series, Yamata is the eight headed dragon which is sealed inside of Chizuru as she is the reincarnation of Kushinadahime. She acknowledges to Kouta that she had forgotten this part about herself knowing that she was not an average fox yōkai. Tamamo is able to temporary seal the dragons until Chizuru masters their power which she able to do with Kouta's help.

Kai (海)
Kai is the son of the sea god Toyotama-hiko. He is trying to find a sea god school that a traveler told him about, and he wants to attend it so that he can win his father's love and respect. Kai also rescued a white Hare of Inaba named Shizuka, ever since then she has been devoted to him.

Kodama (木魂)
Kodama is a small forest spirit that lives in an old tree by the old school building. The old school is built next to the current school Kouta attends so as a result she gets visited by other Yōkai. Kodama is always willing to give advice, and has the ability to tell fortunes. She also has the ability to possess others.

== Media ==
=== Light novels ===
Kanokon began as a series of light novels written by Katsumi Nishino and illustrated by Koin. The series started under the title Kanojo wa Kon, to Kawaiku Seki o Shite (彼女はこん、とかわいく咳をして) when the first novel was submitted to Media Factory's annual literary contest MF Bunko J Light Novel Rookie of the Year Award held in 2005. The novel placed as a "good piece of work" with two other titles, which was more or less third place. The first novel was published on October 25, 2005, and the fifteenth volume was published on December 24, 2010, under Media Factory's MF Bunko J label. The series is currently on an indefinite hiatus, with no word from the authors as to when the series will be resumed. The novels were licensed in North America by Seven Seas Entertainment when they debuted their light novel imprint, but has since been dissolved.

No.	Title	Release date	ISBN
01	Kanokon (かのこん)	October 25, 2005	978-4-8401-1429-5
02	Kanokon 2: Beginnings' Beginnings (かのこん2 ~はじまりはじまり~, Kanokon 2: Hajimari Hajimari)	January 25, 2006	978-4-8401-1488-2
03	Kanokon 3: Yukiyama Family Plan (かのこん3 ~ゆきやまかぞくけいかく~, Kanokon 3: Yukiyama-zoku Keikaku)	April 25, 2006	978-4-8401-1534-6
04	Kanokon 4: The Maidens' Secret (かのこん4 ~オトメたちのヒミツ~, Kanokon 4: Otome-tachi no Himitsu)	July 25, 2006	978-4-8401-1577-3
05	Kanokon 5: Reclaim Your Love! (かのこん5 ~アイをとりもどせ!~, Kanokon 5: Ai o Torimotose!)	October 25, 2006	978-4-8401-1727-2
06	Kanokon 6: The Pied Piper of Nagisa (かのこん6 ~ナギサのぱいぱいぷー~, Kanokon 6: Nagisa no Paipaipū)	January 25, 2007	978-4-8401-1785-2
07	Kanokon 7: Farewell, Wolf (かのこん7 ~さよなら、オオカミ~, Kanokon 7: Sayonara, Ōkami)	June 25, 2007	978-4-8401-1871-2
08	Kanokon 8: A Secret Between Lovers (かのこん8 ~コイビトたちのヒミツ~, Kanokon 8: Koibitotatchi no Himitsu)	November 22, 2007	978-4-8401-2086-9
09	Kanokon 9: A New Awakening (かのこん9 ~あらたなるめざめ~, Kanokon 9: Aratanaru Mezame)	February 25, 2008	978-4-8401-2144-6
10	Kanokon 10: Beginning of the End (かのこん10 ~おわりのはじまり~, Kanokon 10: Owari no Hajimari)	May 25, 2008	978-4-8401-2320-4
11	Kanokon 11: I Will Save My Love! (かのこん11 ~アイはぼくらをすくう!~, Kanokon 11: Ai wa Bokura o Sukū!)	September 25, 2008	978-4-8401-2425-6
12	Kanokon 12: Chizuru's Merry-Go-Round! (かのこん12 ~ちずるメリーゴーラウンド!~, Kanokon 12: Chizuru Merī Gō Raundo!)	January 23, 2009	978-4-8401-2639-7
13	Kanokon 13: Maiden Triangle (かのこん13 ~オトメとらいあんぐる~, Kanokon 13: Otome Toraianguru)	September 25, 2009	978-4-8401-2836-0
14	Kanokon 14: Heart-Pounding☆Love Lesson (かのこん14 ~どきどき☆らぶれっすん~, Kanokon 14: Dokidoki☆Raburessun)	January 25, 2010	978-4-8401-3160-5
15	Kanokon 15: ~The Girlfriend is With......~ (かのこん15 ~カノジョはコンと……~, Kanokon 15 ~Kanojo wa Kon to......~)	December 24, 2010	978-4-8401-3458-3

=== Manga ===
A manga adaptation was serialized in Media Factory's seinen manga magazine Monthly Comic Alive between the August 2006 and August 2010 issues. The manga takes its story from the light novels that preceded it, and is illustrated by Rin Yamaki. Nine tankōbon volumes were released in Japan between January 31, 2007, and August 23, 2010. The manga is licensed in North America by Seven Seas Entertainment, who will release the series in four omnibus volumes.

No.	Original release date	Original ISBN	English release date	English ISBN
1	January 23, 2007	978-1937867355	April 16, 2013	978-1937867355
"She Coughed With a Cutie Little "Yip!" Part 1" (彼女はかわい子ちゃんの小さな「イップ！」で咳をした。 パート1, Kanojo wa kawai ko-chan no chīsana `ippu!' De seki o shita. Pāto 1); "She Coughed With a Cutie Little "Yip!" Part 2" (彼女はかわい子ちゃんの小さな「イップ！」で咳をした。 パート2, Kanojo wa kawai ko-chan no chīsana `ippu!' De seki o shita. Pāto 2); "She Coughed With a Cutie Little "Yip!" Part 3" (彼女はかわい子ちゃんの小さな「イップ！」で咳をした。 パート3, Kanojo wa kawai ko-chan no chīsana `ippu!' De seki o shita. Pāto 3); "She Coughed With a Cutie Little "Yip!" Part 4" (彼女はかわい子ちゃんの小さな「イップ！」で咳をした。 パート4, Kanojo wa kawai ko-chan no chīsana `ippu!' De seki o shita. Pāto 4); "No One Will Leave Him Alone Part 1" (誰も彼を放っておかないパート1, Dare mo kare o hanatte okanai pāto 1); "No One Will Leave Him Alone Part 2" (誰も彼を放っておかないパート2, Dare mo kare o hanatte okanai pāto 2)
2	August 23, 2007	978-4840119412	April 16, 2013	978-1937867355
"No One Will Leave Him Alone Part 3" (誰も彼を放っておかないパート3, Dare mo kare o hanatte okanai pāto 3); "No One Will Leave Him Alone Part 4" (誰も彼を放っておかないパート4, Dare mo kare o hanatte okanai pāto 4); "Me, You He, and She Are Gonna Train Like Hell! (私、あなた、彼、そして彼女は地獄のように訓練するつもりです！, Watashi, anata, kare, soshite kanojo wa jigoku no yō ni kunren suru tsumoridesu!); "She Coughed with A Cute Little "Yip," and He... Part 1" (彼女はかわいい小さな「イップ」で咳をしました、そして彼は...パート1, Kanojo wa kawaī chīsana `ippu' de seki o shimashita, soshite kare wa... Pāto 1); "She Coughed with A Cute Little "Yip," and He... Part 2" (彼女はかわいい小さな「イップ」で咳をしました、そして彼は...パート2, Kanojo wa kawaī chīsana `ippu' de seki o shimashita, soshite kare wa... Pāto 2); "A Fox's Wedding (キツネの結婚式, Kitsune no kekkonshiki)
3	November 2007	978-4840119764	August 6, 2013	978-1937867362
"I Just Can't Hold It In Anymore!" (もう我慢できない！, Mōgamandekinai!); "I've Already Memorized Your Scent" (私はすでにあなたの香りを覚えています, Watashi wa sudeni anata no kaori o oboete imasu); "He Knows a Side of Her I Don't Know Part 1" (彼は彼女の側面を知っている私は知らないパート1, Kare wa kanojo no sokumen o shitte iru watashi wa shiranai pāto 1); "He Knows a Side of Her I Don't Know Part 2" (彼は彼女の側面を知っている私は知らないパート2, Kare wa kanojo no sokumen o shitte iru watashi wa shiranai pāto 2); "I am (We Are) Trying Our Hardest Part 1" (私は（私たちは）私たちの最も懸命に努力しているパート1, Watashi wa (watashitachiha) watashitachi no mottomo kenmei ni doryoku shite iru pāto 1)
4	March 22, 2008	978-4840122115	August 6, 2013	978-1937867362
5	October 23, 2008	978-4840122733	December 3, 2013	978-1937867829
6	March 23, 2009	978-4840125475	December 3, 2013	978-1937867829
7	July 23, 2009	978-4840125932	May 20, 2014	978-1626920125
8	December 22, 2009	978-4840129589	May 20, 2014	978-1626920125
9	August 23, 2010	978-4840133661	May 20, 2014	978-1626920125

=== Anime ===
A twelve-episode anime adaptation produced by Xebec aired in Japan between April 5 and June 21, 2008, on AT-X. Six DVD volumes were released by Media Factory between June 25 and November 21, 2008, There are also six specials spread out over three DVDs. A box set was later released on January 22, 2010. The anime is licensed in North America by Media Blasters under the title Kanokon: The Girl Who Cried Fox, and released the first volume on May 25, 2010. Media Blasters later announced that they will not release volumes 2 and 3 of the series, and instead released a box set on March 22, 2011.

A two-part OVA, entitled Kanokon: Manatsu no Daishanikusai (かのこん ～真夏の大謝肉祭～; lit. Kanokon: The Great Midsummer Carnival), was announced. The first episode aired on AT-X on October 4, 2009, and the second on October 11, 2009. Both episodes were released on DVD between November 25 and December 22, 2009, by Media Factory. The OVA is licensed in North America by Media Blasters, as with the anime, and released the series on DVD on June 21, 2011.

The anime's opening theme is "Phosphor" by Ui Miyazaki, while the ending theme is "Koi no Honō" (恋の炎; "Flame of Love") sung by Yui Sakakibara. The opening theme for the OVA is "Sunlight of the Sordino" (木漏れ日のソルディーノ, Komorebi no Sorudino) by Yui Sakakibara, and the ending theme is "Lupinus: Winds of Happiness" (ルピナス～幸せの風～, Rupinasu ~Shiwaze no Kaze~) by Ui Miyazaki.

=== Visual novel ===
A visual novel developed for the PlayStation 2 entitled Kanokon Esuii (かのこん えすいー, Kanokon Esuī) was released on July 31, 2008, and developed by 5pb. in limited and regular editions. The limited edition came bundled with an audio CD containing an image song and an original drama. The song, "Koi no Miracle Summer Vacation" (恋のミラクル☆サマーバケーション, Koi no Mirakuru☆Samā Bakēshon; lit. "Miracle Summer Vacation of Love"), is sung by Mamiko Noto, Ayako Kawasumi, and Miyū Takeuchi, the voice actresses of Kouta, Chizuru, and Nozomu, respectively. The audio drama is entitled "Natsu no Hi no Hajimari" (夏の日のはじまり; lit. "The Beginning of a Summery Day"). The game is described by the development team as a "noisy romantic-comedy ADV (ドタバタラブコメADV, Dotabata Rabucome ADV). The game's opening theme is "Happy Succession" sung by Ui Miyazaki, and the single containing the song was released on August 27, 2008. The ending theme is "Eien no Koi" (永遠の恋; lit. "Eternal Love") by Yui Sakakibara.

=== Other ===
A drama CD based on the series was released on March 28, 2007, by Media Factory. The drama's theme song was "Otoko no Ko Desho" (オトコのコでしょ) by Marina Kuroki. Another drama CD was sold on June 25, 2008.

An Internet radio show produced by Media Factory called Kanokon Radio: Kouta's and Chizuru's Bouncing Growth Diary (かのこんラジオ 〜耕太とちずるのゆやよん成長日記〜, Kanokon Rajio ~Kōta to Chizuru no Yuya Yon Seichō Nikki~) began airing on March 21, 2007. One episode is broadcast every other week on Friday. The show is hosted by Mamiko Noto (the voice of Kouta in the anime), and Ayako Kawasumi (the voice of Chizuru in the anime). There are four corners, or parts, to each episode. The shows starts with a short radio drama, which moves on to general news about the Kanokon anime and series in general. Listeners can send in comments about the show up on the air. The show's opening theme is "Strategy" by Ui Miyazaki, and the ending theme is "Sweet Time" by Yui Sakakibara.

== Reception ==
The first DVD of Kanokon was ranked tenth on the Tohan charts between June 26 and July 2, 2008, ranked eighth between July 10 and 16, 2008. The third DVD of Kanokon was ranked sixth on the Tohan charts between August 21 and 27, 2008. The fourth DVD of Kanokon was ranked 21st on the Tohan charts between September 23 and 29, 2008. The fifth DVD of Kanokon was ranked 28th on the Tohan charts between October 21 and 28, 2008. The sixth DVD of Kanokon was ranked 14th on the Tohan charts between November 19 and 25, 2008.

The characters have received both praise and criticism from publications dedicated to anime and manga. Kouta's character was criticized by THEM anime reviews for the artwork in the anime adaptation. His facial appearance was described as being featureless, and unlike the manga too young looking. Theron Martin from Anime News Network said that Kouta's youthful appearance in the anime makes Chizuru's advances appear like borderline shotacon. Chizuru's character was ranked #10 in a list of top 10 sexiest female anime/manga characters for her affection towards Kouta in public. Like Kouta however, her appearance was criticized by THEM Anime reviews for lacking facial features in the anime adaptation. Travis Bruno from Capsule Computers gave Chizuru's manga appearance a good review, saying that she is designed well with "clear cut differences" between her human and fox forms. Nozomu's appearance in the anime was mentioned in a review by Chris Beveridge from the Fandom Post. He stated that the addition of Nozomu without a doubt adds more competition to things, going on to say that unlike Chizuru Nozomu competes with Chizuru on more of a quiet side which adds to her appeal.
