= Time Leap =

Japanese visual novel

- Time Leap original visual novel cover.

タイムリープ (Taimu Rīpu)
- Genre: Drama, Fantasy, Romance
- Video game
- Developer: Front Wing
- Publisher: Front Wing (Windows); Prototype (360, PS3)
- Genre: Eroge, Visual novel
- Platform: Windows, Xbox 360, PlayStation 3
- Released: December 27, 2007 (Windows)
- Video game

Time Leap Paradise
- Developer: Front Wing
- Publisher: Front Wing
- Genre: Eroge, Visual novel
- Platform: Windows
- Released: August 28, 2009 (Windows)
- Video game

Time Leap Paradise Super Live!
- Developer: Front Wing
- Publisher: Front Wing
- Genre: Simulation
- Platform: Windows
- Released: December 15, 2016 (Windows)

Time Leap (タイムリープ, Taimu Rīpu) is a Japanese visual novel developed by Front Wing. It was first released as an adult game for Windows on December 27, 2007, and it was followed by an all-ages version release for the Xbox 360 on June 25, 2009. Time Leap is Front Wing's thirteenth title, along with previous titles such as Megachu!. The game is Front Wing's first title to feature 3D computer graphics, as well as utilizes anti-aliasing and HDR rendering technologies. The gameplay in Time Leap follows a linear plot line, which offers pre-determined scenarios and courses of interaction, and focuses on the appeal of the five female main characters.

== Gameplay ==
Average conversation in Time Leap depicting the main character Ayumu Nagase and Ayumu.

The gameplay in Time Leap requires little player interaction as much of the time is spent on reading the text that appears on the lower portion of the screen, which represents either dialogue between characters, or the inner thoughts of the protagonist. Every so often, the player will come to a "decision point", where he or she is given the chance to choose from multiple options. The time between these points is variable and can occur anywhere from a minute to much longer. Gameplay pauses at these points and depending on which choice the player makes, the plot will progress in a specific direction. There are five main plot lines that the player will have the chance to experience, one for each of the heroines in the story. To view all five plot lines, the player will have to replay the game multiple times and make different decisions to progress the plot in an alternate direction.

Outside of Time Leap's normal gameplay, there are several additional content that serves to lengthen the game. A graphical benchmark was released both online and along with the game. To evaluate the graphic capabilities of the player's system, the benchmark generates a dance sequence featuring characters from the visual novel in real-time. Prior to the evaluation, the benchmark also allows the player to modify multiple graphical settings, such as rendering techniques, visual appearance, as well as the characters' costumes. While the online version features the characters Ayumu and Ayumu Nagase singing the song, the version included with the game features the characters Ayumu Nagase and Yuu. Both of the versions feature the song "Happy Holiday". Subsequent versions that are included with image song singles instead feature characters and songs from the respective CDs.

== Development ==
Time Leap is the thirteenth title developed by Front Wing and is also their first title to feature 3D computer graphics. The producer for the game is Ryūichirō Yamakawa, as with their previous titles. The characters in the game are both designed and modeled by Ma@ya. The scenario for Time Leap were written by four people: Hare Kitagawa, Kazuya, Takeyuki Kizumi, and Eiji Narumi. Kazuya and Narumi has also provided the scenario for Time Leap Paradise along with Mai Shinjō. The development team for Time Leap, with the exception of Ma@ya and Kitagawa, has also worked on previous Front Wing titles such as Megachu!. Kitagawa has previously also provided scenario for Minori's Haru no Ashioto.

Time-Leap utilizes various rendering techniques such as cel-shading and high dynamic range rendering in its graphics processing, resulting in a 3D environment that resembles 2D animation. While graphics in the Xbox 360 version run at a consistent 60 frames per second, frame rate in the Windows version is determined by various circumstances such as the game's native resolution, the rendering techniques being selected, as well as the player's graphics processing unit.

=== Release history ===
Before the game's release, a benchmark of Time Leap was released online on August 3, 2009. The benchmark program consisted of a short conversation sequence typical of the gameplay found in a visual novel and a real-time dance sequence used to evaluate the graphic capabilities of the player's system. Time Leap was first released as an adult game for Windows on December 27, 2007 in both limited and regular editions. The limited edition release, in addition to the game itself, contains a five hundred-page partial storyboard collection drawn by various artists such as Akio Watanabe. An all-ages version for the Xbox 360 was published by Prototype on June 25, 2009 in limited and regular editions: the limited edition release includes a music album containing three tracks used in the version's benchmark. A PlayStation 3 version, also published by Prototype, will also be released in early 2012. The Xbox 360 version contains additional scenarios, graphics, as well as remastered, real-time rendered sequences in place of the pre-rendered sequences found in the original Windows release, and the PS3 version will also provide stereoscopic 3D compatibility.
