= Ansem (disambiguation) =

Ansem, Seeker of Darkness is the original form of the fictional character Xehanort from the Kingdom Hearts role playing game.

Ansem may also refer to:

- Ansem the Wise, a character from Kingdom Hearts
- Ansem Smart (Japanese: アンセム・スマート, romanized: Ansemu Sumāto), a character from Let This Grieving Soul Retire!
- AnSem, an analogue semiconductor designer of mixed-signal integrated circuits
