= Sakura Sakura (video game) =

2009 video game

- Developer: Haikuo Soft
- Publishers: JP: Haikuo Soft (Windows); GN Software (PSP); Entergram (PS4 & PSV); WW: Sol Press (Windows)
- Platforms: Microsoft Windows, PlayStation 4, PlayStation Portable, PlayStation Vita
- Release: June 26, 2009: Windows; JP: June 26, 2009; WW: November 19, 2018 PlayStation Portable; JP: June 26, 2009 PlayStation 4, PlayStation Vita; JP: October 25, 2018
- Genres: Eroge, Visual novel
- Mode: Single-player

Sakura Sakura (さくらさくら) is a Japanese adult visual novel developed by Haikuo Soft. It was released on June 26, 2009, for Microsoft Windows as a DVD after making several postponements. The game is described by the development team as a "school dormitory romance see-saw game" (学園寮恋愛シーソーゲーム, Gakuen Ryō Ren'ai Shīsō Gēmu). The gameplay in Sakura Sakura follows a linear plot line, which offers predetermined scenarios and courses of interaction, and focuses on the appeal of the female main characters.

== Gameplay ==
An average conversation in Sakura Sakura depicting one of the main characters, Akira talking to Naoki.

The gameplay in Sakura Sakura requires little player interaction as most of the duration of the game is spent on simply reading the text that appears on the screen, which represents either dialogue between characters, or the inner thoughts of the protagonists. Similar to 2D platformers, Sakura Sakura allows the player to navigate through the dormitory from a profile side-view perspective. Every so often, the player will come to a "decision point" where he or she is given the chance to choose from options that are displayed on the screen, typically two to three at a time. Gameplay pauses at these points until the player makes a choice, and depending on which choice the player makes, the plot will progress in a specific direction. There are multiple plot lines that the player will have the chance to experience. To view all of the plot lines, the player will need to replay the game multiple times, access different areas and make different choices to progress the plot in an alternate direction. One of the goals of the gameplay is to view the hentai scenes, depicting one of the protagonists having sexual intercourse with one of the heroines.

== Plot and characters ==
Unlike most visual novels, Sakura Sakura consists of three chapters and follows the stories of two protagonists. The first chapter follows the life of Tōru Inaba (稲葉 徹, Inaba Tōru; Voiced by: Kentarō Ōkubo) and his romantic relationship with Nanako Sakura (桜 菜々子, Sakura Nanako; Voiced by: Izumi Maki) and Sakura Kirishima (桐島さくら, Kirishima Sakura; Voiced by: Yukari Aoyama). The second chapter takes place a year afterwards, and follows the life of Naoki Fuse (布施 直樹, Fuse Naoki; Voiced by: Hitoka Kinosaki), and his romantic relationship with his childhood friends Akira Shinden (新田 晶, Nitta Akira; Voiced by: Yuika Kanematsu) and Kurumi Tachibana (立花くるみ, Tachibana Kurumi; Voiced by: Yui Sakakibara). It is then followed by a third chapter, which continues the relationship between Tōru, Nanako and Sakura.

The story begins with Tōru Inaba, a second-year high school student transferring into the Rintoku Academy (麟徳学園, Rintoku Gakuen). On his first day of school, Tōru discovers that all the empty rooms at the school dormitory, Maison Lune, was arranged for only first-year students, and he has no choice but to move into a second, smaller school dormitory named Tsukimi Apartments (月見荘, Tsukimi Sō). There, he meets two residents of the dormitory, Akira Shinden, a short-tempered, aggressive member of the gymnastics club, and Naoki Fuse, an easy-going kendo club member who shows no interests in education, which resulted in him often being referred as a NEET. Both of them attempts to recruit Tōru into the club they respectively belong to, but is interrupted by Nanako Sakura, a soft-spoken, caring teacher and the dormitory's matron, who falls into Tōru's arms, while trying to stop the two.

== Development ==
Sakura Sakura was the fifth project developed by Haikuo Soft, and was developed as an adult game like Yotsunoha. Much of the development team is composed of the staff that has previously developed Yotsunoha. The scenario was provided by Tatomu and Keikei. Art direction and character designs were headed by three people, Akira Kasukabe, Xsara, and Yukari Higa, who has previously illustrated the manga series Shina Dark, with cut-in graphics provided by Mako Aboshi. The music used in Sakura Sakura was composed entirely by Ryō Kyōna.

=== Release history ===
Before the game's release, a free game demo of Sakura Sakura was released online on June 6, 2008, which gave the player a glimpse into the story and gameplay of Sakura Sakura. The full game was released on June 26, 2009, as a DVD playable only on a Microsoft Windows PC. Sakura Sakura suffered several postponements since its original announcement. The development team acknowledged the game's postponement by a year, and has stated that scenario writing and voice recording is still taking place. An all-ages version of the game, titled Sakura Sakura: Haru Urara, was released on August 26, 2010, for the PlayStation Portable by GN Software. A version for PlayStation 4 and PlayStation Vita was released on October 25, 2018, by Entergram. An official English language localization by Sol Press was crowdfunded via Kickstarter and released on November 19, 2018.

== Adaptations ==
=== Books and publications ===
Before the game's release, a book titled Sakura Sakura Prelude Book was released on October 14, 2007. The book is fully colored, and contained information on the release of the visual novel. Four A3-sized posters were included with the book, each depicting one of the four main heroines from the game.

=== Audio CDs ===
The visual novel featured two pieces of theme music. The opening theme was "See-saw!", and was performed by Chata, composed by Ryō Kyōna, and written by Keikei. The ending theme was "Place", performed by Yuiko.

Prior to the release of the game, an image song single titled Nanako Sakura and Kirishima Sakura's character disk (桜菜々子・桐島さくら キャラクターディスク, Sakura Nanako Kirishima Sakura Kyarakutā Disuku) was released on May 28, 2008. It was sung by Izumi Maki and Yukari Aoyama, two voice actress who voiced Nanako Sakura and Sakura Kirishima in the visual novel respectively.

== Reception and sales ==
Prior to the release of the game, according to a national ranking based on pre-orders made on bishōjo games, Sakura Sakura was placed at fifth place during mid-February to mid-March 2008, and was again listed on the ranking during mid-April to mid-May, as the fourth most pre-ordered title; it was listed on the ranking during mid-June to mid-July, as the second most pre-ordered title, and was placed at fourth place on the same ranking the next month.

Wes Playfair of NookGaming described it as a derivative and uneven experience, with uninspired protagonists, and stated that the heroines lacked depth. Marcus Estrada of Hardcore Gamer was more positive, praising the comedic value of the game.
