= Tasaka =

Tasaka (written: 田坂 or 田阪) is a Japanese surname. Notable people with the surname include:

- Hideki Tasaka (田坂 秀樹, born 1975), Japanese voice actor
- Katsuhiko Tasaka (田坂 勝彦, 1914–1979), Japanese film director
- Kazuaki Tasaka (田坂 和昭, born 1971), Japanese footballer
- Tokio Tasaka (田阪 登紀夫, born 1947), Japanese table tennis player
- Tomotaka Tasaka (田坂 具隆, 1902–1974), Japanese film director
- Yusuke Tasaka (田坂 祐介, born 1985), Japanese footballer

== See also ==
- 6873 Tasaka, a main-belt asteroid
