= How to Treat a Lady Knight Right =

Japanese manga series

- First tankōbon volume cover, featuring Leo Cornelia

今まで一度も女扱いされたことがない女騎士を女扱いする漫画 (Ima made Ichidomo Onna Atsukai sareta koto ga nai Onna Kishi wo Onna Atsukai Suru Manga)
- Genre: Fantasy; Romantic comedy; Slice of life
- Manga
- Written by: Kengo Matsumoto
- Published by: Kodansha
- English publisher: NA: Sol Press (former) Kodansha USA
- Imprint: Sirius KC
- Magazine: Suiyōbi no Sirius
- Original run: March 28, 2018 – March 11, 2021
- Volumes: 7

How to Treat a Lady Knight Right (今まで一度も女扱いされたことがない女騎士を女扱いする漫画, Ima made Ichidomo Onna Atsukai sareta koto ga nai Onna Kishi o Onna Atsukai suru Manga) is a Japanese manga series written and illustrated by Kengo Matsumoto. It was serialized on the Nico Nico Seiga website under Kodansha's Suiyōbi no Sirius brand from March 2018 and March 2021.

== Plot ==
Leo Cornelia is the kingdom's strongest knight, revered as the "Undefeatable Holy Blade". Having trained with the sword since birth, Leo has lived her entire life on the battlefield. Accustomed to being challenged as a warrior rather than approached as a woman, she is completely unprepared when the easygoing and seemingly foolish young mage named Foolie Dent unexpectedly confesses his love to her.

Foolie's straightforward affection forces Leo to confront emotions and concepts that she long ago set aside, such as love and femininity. Though initially confused and resistant, Leo gradually finds herself relying on Foolie's earnestness and dependability, even as his behavior continues to surprise her.

== Publication ==
Written and illustrated by Kengo Matsumoto, How to Treat a Lady Knight Right was serialized on the Nico Nico Seiga website under Kodansha's Suiyōbi no Sirius brand from March 28, 2018, and March 11, 2021. Its chapters were collected into seven tankōbon volumes from January 9, 2019, to May 7, 2021. The series was licensed in English by Sol Press, who released one volume in 2019 before they collapsed in 2021. The series was later licensed digitally-only by Kodansha USA, who released it in 2023 and 2024.

No.	Original release date	Original ISBN	North American release date	North American ISBN
1	January 9, 2019	978-4-06-514228-8	July 7, 2019 (SP); November 21, 2023 (KUSA)	978-1-94-8838-28-3 (SP); 978-1-68-491401-2 (KUSA)
Chapters 1–20; Bonus Chapter: "The Lady Knight's Muscles You Wanted to See" (「あなたが見たい女騎士の筋肉」漫画, "Anata ga Mitai Onna Kishi no Kinniku" Manga)
2	March 8, 2019	978-4-06-514782-5	January 16, 2024	978-1-68-491457-9
Chapters 21–38; Bonus Chapter: "The Lady Knight and Afterward..." (女騎士とその後..., Onna Kishi to Sonogo...)
3	July 9, 2019	978-4-06-516207-1	February 27, 2024	978-1-68-491503-3
Chapters 39–57; Bonus Chapter: "The Lady Knight and Newlywed Life" (女騎士と新婚生活, Onna Kishi to Shinkon Seikatsu)
4	November 8, 2019	978-4-06-517418-0	April 16, 2024	978-1-68-491553-8
Chapters 58–75; Bonus Chapter: "Not Quite the Same This Time" (今回は前回とちょっと違う, Konkai wa Zenkai to Chotto Chigau)
5	April 9, 2020	978-4-06-518951-1	June 11, 2024	978-1-68-491604-7
Chapters 76–92; Bonus Chapter: "What If Leo and Foolie Were High School Students?" (もしもレオとフーリーが高校生だったら, Moshimo Reo to Fūrī ga Kōkōsei Dattara)
6	November 9, 2020	978-4-06-521182-3	July 30, 2024	978-1-68-491653-5
Chapters 93–112; Bonus Chapter: "Leo in the Bath" (レオとお風呂, Reo to o Furo)
7	May 7, 2021	978-4-06-523036-7	September 17, 2024	978-1-68-491713-6
Chapters 113–131; Bonus Chapter: "The Lady Knight's Wedding Night" (女騎士と初夜, Onna Kishi to Shoya)

== Reception ==
The series' fourth volume featured a recommendation from manga author Yabako Sandrovich.

== See also ==
- Jimoto no Ijimekko-tachi ni Shikaeshi Shiyōto Shitara, Betsu no Tatakai ga Hajimatta, another manga series by the same author
