= Chata =

Japanese singer (born 1979)

- Born: November 21, 1979 (age 46)
- Genres: J-pop, video game, anime music
- Occupation: Singer
- Instrument: Vocals
- Years active: 1998–present
- Labels: Lantis, TEAM Entertainment

Chata (茶太; born November 21, 1979) is a Japanese singer who has performed theme songs for video games and anime series. She has also participated in various dōjin music circles. Her own private circle is called Usagi Kinoko.

== History ==
Chata began dabbling in music in 1998. She used to participate in writing lyrics on Niftyserve's forum for Original MIDI music. She has participated in many dojin music circles, mainly lending her vocals while for some she has voice-acted. At the same time she also releases works of her own under Usagi Kinoko, the circle she runs. She is the main vocalist for two dojin music circles, Idea (formerly known as Souleave) and My Sound Life. In March 2007, she collaborated with composer Yoko Shimomura and released her first major debut album, Murmur. In the same year, she performed the ending theme for the anime television series Potemayo, which first broadcast in July.

Chata is known for her sweet, whisper-like voice. She is close friends with dojin musicians Rekka Katakiri and Haruka Shimotsuki, and they have collaborated on many occasions. They once formed the group Shimochamin, and from December 2006 to June 2007 the three of them hosted the internet radio show Harechatta Utatane Biyori. She, Rekka and Haruka have all performed on the Ar tonelico Hymmnos Musical – Side Cocona.

== Discography ==
=== Major releases ===
==== Singles ====
- Bravery ~tadoritsukitai kimi e~
  Released on June 20, 2007, by TEAM Entertainment
1. "Bravery ~tadoritsukitai kimi e~" (Bravery ～辿り着きたい君へ～) — PS2 game Growlanser VI: Precarious World opening theme
2. "BEGIN" — PS2 game Growlanser VI: Precarious World ending theme
3. "Yoake Mae" (夜明け前)
4. "Bravery ~tadoritsukitai kimi e~" (Bravery ～辿り着きたい君へ～) (Instrumental)
5. "BEGIN" (Instrumental)
6. "Yoake Mae" (夜明け前) (Instrumental)
- Utatane
  Released on August 22, 2007, by Lantis
1. "Utatane" (うたたね) — anime television Potemayo ending theme
2. "Madoromi" (まどろみ)
3. "Utatane" (うたたね) (off vocal)
4. "Madoromi" (まどろみ) (off vocal)
- Suiheisen Made Nan Mile?
  Released on May 3, 2008, by ABHAR
  PC game Suiheisen Made Nan Mile? image song
1. "Suiheisen Made Nan Mile?" (水平線まで何マイル?) Original Orchestra ver.
2. "Suiheisen Made Nan Mile?" (水平線まで何マイル?) Piano ver.
3. "Suiheisen Made Nan Mile?" (水平線まで何マイル?) Original Orchestra ver. (off vocal)
4. "Suiheisen Made Nan Mile?" (水平線まで何マイル?) Piano ver. (off vocal)

==== Albums ====
- Chata@Yoko Shimomura: murmur
  Released on March 21, 2007, by TEAM Entertainment
1. "Harukaze" (春風)
2. "Sanpo Biyori" (散歩日和)
3. "Naishobako no Yume" (内緒箱の夢)
4. "Tōmei na Wa" (透明な輪)
5. "Kamikakushi" (神隠し)
6. "Hitokoto" (ひとこと)
7. "Tasogare Komichi" (黄昏小道)
8. "Uwasa" (うわさ)
9. "Bukiyō na Te" (不器用な手)
10. "Toganin no Yoake" (咎人の夜明け)
11. "Happy End" (ハッピーエンド)
12. "Kimi no Kakera" (君のかけら)
- Sora no Kioku (空の記憶)
  Released on April 23, 2008, by TEAM Entertainment
1. "Taiyō" (太陽)
2. "Tan Ton Totan" (たんとんとたん)
3. "Shabondama" (しゃぼんだま)
4. "Kaerimichi" (かえりみち)
5. "Monokuro" (モノクロ)
6. "Sora no Kioku" (空の記憶)
- Chata no Wa (ちゃたのわ)
  Released on June 25, 2008, by Lantis
1. "sings clover ~many clover version~"
2. "One-way Shining" — PC game Clear insert song
3. "Tsumetai Heya" (冷たい部屋)
4. "Nanairo Prism" (七色プリズム)
5. "Curry no Uta" (カレーの唄)
6. "Papapapanda" (パパパパンダ)
7. "step! jump!"
8. "step of cloud" — anime television sola image song
9. "Yasashii" (やさしい) — anime television Kodomo no Jikan episode 6 ending theme
10. "Tabun Seishun" (たぶん青春)
11. "Kataomoi" (片想い)
12. "Utatane" (うたたね)
13. "Kōsa" (交差)
14. "Madoromi" (まどろみ) ~remix version "From Mishuku to Everywhere"~
15. "Mirai no Monogatari" (未来の物語) — PC game Hoshiful ~Seitō Gakuen Tenmon Dōkōkai~ grand opening theme
16. "Tsuki Kaoru" (つきかをる)
- Chata Works Best (茶太 Works Best)
  Released on April 29, 2009, by TEAM Entertainment
1. "Bravery ~tadoritsukitai kimi e~" (Bravery ～辿り着きたい君へ～)
2. "BEGIN"
3. "Love♥Rice" (ラブ♥ライス) — PS2 game Yotsunoha: A journey of sincerity ending theme
4. "Hare→Koigokoro" (晴れ→恋心) — PC game Hare Hare Halem opening theme
5. "see-saw!!" — game Sakura Sakura opening theme
6. "Shirushi" (しるし)
7. "Kuon ~utakata~" (久遠 ～詩歌侘～) — PC game Koihime†Musō: Doki☆Otome Darake no Sangokushi Engi insert song
8. "Shizai Senri ~koihime yobite hyakka no ō to nasu~" (志在千里 ～恋姫喚作百花王～) — PC game Koihime†Musō: Doki☆Otome Darake no Sangokushi Engi ending theme
9. "Oetsu" (嗚咽)
10. "Yoake Mae" (夜明け前)
11. "Mint Kiss" — PC game Angel Wish: Hōkago no Meshitsukai ni chu! ending theme
12. "Photograph" (フォトグラフ) — PC game Melty Moment ending theme
13. "Takaramono" (宝物)
14. "Yotsunoha" (よつのは) — PC game Yotsunoha opening theme
- Nanairo (なないろ)
  Released on May 19, 2010, by TEAM Entertainment
1. "Smile" (すまいる)
2. "Daisuki" (だいすきっ)
3. "Alarm-san" (あらーむサン)
4. "Nai nai na" (ないないな)
5. "Shinjuku Meizu" (新宿迷図)
6. "Yoru o Koete" (夜を超えて)
7. "Teikan" (諦観)
8. "Arikata" (在り方)
9. "Nagareboshi" (流れ星)
10. "Koisuru☆Otome" (恋する☆乙女)
11. "Nanairo no Sekai" (なないろの世界) — MMORPG MapleStory monthly theme song
- Chata Works Best II (茶太 Works Best II)
  Released on November 24, 2010, by TEAM Entertainment
1. "Nanairo no Sekai" (なないろの世界) — MMORPG MapleStory February 2010 theme song
2. "Asaki Yumemishi" (あさきゆめみし) — PS2 game Shin・Koihime†Musō: Otome Ryōran☆Sangokushi Engi insert song
3. "always" — PS2 game Magicarat☆Radiant ending theme
4. "Chuu no Hikari" (宙のヒカリ) — PC game Hoshizora no Memoria Eternal Heart ending theme
5. "Wasurenai..." (忘れない...) — PC game Kiss×Lord×Darjeeling ending theme
6. "Koi o Shiyo yo (Chata Version)" (恋をしよーよ (茶太バージョン)) — PC game Sakura Bitmap insert song
7. "Tasogare Sora" (たそがれ空) — PC game hoshiuta ~Starlight Serenade~ ending theme
8. "Yumekara Sametemo" (夢から覚めても) — PS2 game Suzunone Seven! ~Rebirth★knot~ ending theme
9. "cotton candy" — PC game Sakura Bitmap ending theme
10. "Sakura ga Mau Sora no Shita de" (桜が舞う空の下で) — PC game canvas3 ~Hakugin no Portrait~ Yamabuki Renge image song
11. "Hoshizora no Memoria" (星空のメモリア) — PC game Hoshizora no Memoria ending theme
12. "Nijiiro Adolescence" (虹色アドレセンス) — PSP game B's-LOG Party♪ opening theme
13. "Yume Egao" (夢笑顔) — PC game Shin・Koihime†Musō ~Moeshōden~ insert song
14. "with you" — PC game Suzunone Seven! ending theme
15. "Suiheisen made Nan Mile?" (水平線まで何マイル？) — PC game Suiheisen made Nan Mile? -Deep Blue Sky & Pure White Wings- image song
16. "Harmony"

==== Games ====
- PC Kimi no Koe ga Kikoeru (2006): "Puchitami" (theme song)
- PC Koisuru Otome to Shugo no Tate' (2007): "Futari no Miru Sekai" (Ren & Marina's ending theme)
- PC Boku ga Sadame Kimi ni wa Tsubasa o. (2007): "Kimi to Futari de..." (ending theme)
- PC Princess Frontier (2008): "my sweet home" (ending theme)
- PC G Senjō no Maō (2008): "Yuki no Hane Toki no Kaze" (ending theme)
- PC Chaste☆Chase! (2008): "Ai no Yukue" (ending theme, duet with Rekka Katakiri)
- PC Shin・Koihime†Musō: Otome Ryōran☆Sangokushi Engi (2008): "Asaki Yumemishi" (insert song), "Shizai Senri ~koihime yobite hyakka no ō to nasu~ [Piano Version]" (ending theme)
- PC Suzunone Seven! (2009): "with you" (ending theme)
- PC Devils Devel Concept (2009): "Heavenwards" (insert song)
- PC Like a Butler (2009): "Gruppo" (opening theme)
- PC Canvas 3: Hakugin no Portrait (2009): "cotton candy" (image song)
- PC W.L.O. Sekai Ren'ai Kikō (2009): "Mōsō Let's Go!!" (Yuriko Hayakawa ending theme)
- PC Hoshizora no Memoria -Wish upon a shooting star- (2009): "Hoshizora no Memoria" (ending theme)
- PC echo. (2009): "Natsu no Kioku" (ending theme)
- PC Ashita wa Kitto, Haremasu yō ni (2009) – "Sasa ni Negai o" (opening theme), "Anata ni Aete" (ending theme)
- PC LOVE×EVOLUTION (2009) – "Kirakira" (opening theme)
- PC Distance (2009) – "Michishirube" (ending theme)
- Arcade Taiko no Tatsujin 12: Don! to Zoryoban, Taiko no Tatsujin 13 (2009): "Yūjō Pop"
- PC Skyprythem (2009): "Ashita no Tenshi" (opening theme), "power smile!" (insert song), "Naiteru Kumo to Yasashii Ame" (insert song), "Nijiiro Sonata" (ending theme)
- PC Kiss to Maō to Darjeeling: Kiss×Lord×Darjeeling (2009): "Wasurenai..." (ending theme)
- PC Shirokuma Bell Stars♪ (2009): "Winter Bells♪" (opening theme)
- PC Hoshiuta: Starlight Serenade (2009): "Tasogarezora" (ending theme)
- Arcade Pop'n Music 18: Sengoku Retsuden (2010): "Kurokami Midareshi Shura to Narite" (under the alias Muramasa Kuoria)
- PC Hoshizora no Memoria -Eternal Heart- (2010): "Chū ni Hikari" (ending theme)
- PC Kashimashi Communication (2010): "Hora ne" (opening theme)
- PC Magicarat☆Radiant (2010): "always" (ending theme)
- PC Cross Days (2010): "timeless melody" (ending theme)
- PSP Himawari -Pebble in the sky- Portable (2010): "Himawari" (ending theme)
- PSP B's-LOG Party♪ (2010): "Nijiiro Adolescence" (opening theme), "Tsunagaru Sora" (ending theme, performed as part of Arcane)
- PS2 Suzunone Seven! Rebirth knot (2010): "Yume kara Samete mo" (ending theme)
- PC Grisaia no Kajitsu: Le Fruit De La Grisaia (2011): "SKIP" (Michiru's ending theme)
- PC Koiimo SWEET☆DAYS(2012): "Colorful precious life" (opening theme)
- PC Kono Oozora ni Tsubasa o Hirogete(2012): "Precious Wing" (opening theme)
- Catarina

==== Other ====
- doll ~Utahime vol.3 -Suzu- (released on August 27, 2004): "My cowardly heart", "Zutto Sono Mama de"
- Winter Mix vol.02 (released on January 13, 2005): "Sleeping snow"
- Winter Mix vol.3 (released on March 11, 2006): "Seijaku"
- Yogurting Original Sound Track (released on August 9, 2006): "Love☆Dreamer"
- Higurashi no Naku Koro ni image album: Kakera Musubi (released on September 27, 2006): "samsara"
- Winter Mix vol.4 (released on February 14, 2007): "Setsuei"
- anime television Clannad OP/ED maxi single: Mag Mell / Dango Daikazoku (released on October 26, 2007): "Dango Daikazoku"
- Higurashi no Naku Koro ni Kai image album: Kokoro Musubi (released December 21, 2007): "Matsuribayashi ga Kikoeru", "Kokoro Musubi"
- Winter Mix vol.5 (released on February 14, 2008): "Kizuna" (as idea)
- OVA Yotsunoha OP/ED maxi single Koisuru Kioku/Negai (released on February 29, 2008): "Negai"
- Shina Dark: Kuroki Tsuki no Ō to Sōheki no Tsuki no Himegimi Vocal Album (released on November 26, 2008): "Whereabouts" (music clip song)
- Suki da yo (OVA Yotsunoha theme song single, soundtrack and DVD vol. 1 & 2 redemption single, released in August 2008): "Suki da yo"

=== Independent releases ===
==== Dojin music circles ====
Usagi Kinoko

- -+Chikai+- (released on August 17, 2003)
- eclipse (released on August 13, 2006)
- Tabun Seishun (released on August 17, 2007)
- Sabishinbou. (released on December 31, 2007)
- eclipse kai (released on December 29, 2008)
- Kaleidoscope (released on December 30, 2009)
- Rakujitsu (released on August 14, 2010)

idea (formerly known as souleave)

- living (released on August 13, 2005)

my sound life

- fractal (released on April 29, 2006)
- crystal (released on October 9, 2006)
- rainbow (released on April 29, 2007)
- fundamental (released on October 8, 2007)
- way and unknown (released on October 13, 2008)
- light (released on May 5, 2010)
- new way to the star (released on May 1, 2011)
- wordless garden (released on April 30, 2012)
- your sound vision (released on August 11, 2012)
- square vision (released on October 28. 2012)
- re:construction (released on May 20. 2013)

Voltage of Imagination

- bermei.inazawa / feat. Chata: Ancient Colors Infinity vol.2: Soukou no Renka (released on November 20, 2004)
- Hiroyuki Oshima / feat. Chata: ORBITAL MANEUVER phase two: anemotaxis (released on February 10, 2006)
- Chata x bermei.inazawa x ESTi x Hiroyuki Oshima x interface x Yoshitsugi: Asayake Borderline (The Borderline of Morning Glow) (released on December 31, 2006)

EastNewSound

She sang several songs per each of those albums.

- Lucent Wish (released on August 15, 2009): "Lucent Wish"
- Sacred Factor (released on December 30, 2009): "Lucid Dream"
- Felsic Mirage (released on August 14, 2010): "Tsuisō Jojōkyoku -lycoris-", "Yūne Zekka, Ryōran no Sai"
- Split Theory (released on December 30, 2010): "Subterranean Emotion"
- Definite Energy (released on May 5, 2011): "sound of carnation"
- Solitude Blossom (released on August 13, 2011): "Ōeisaien"
- Uncanny Instinct (released on December 30, 2011): "Kawaranu Sekai de"
- Dione Aggregation (released on December 30, 2011): "Seisō Rinne ~Repeat~"
- Blaze Out (released on August 11, 2012): "Kōōyūrō"
- Limited Dimension (released on August 11, 2012): "Limited Dimension"
- Radical Destruction (released on August 12, 2013): "Important Lie"

==== Dojin games ====
- RE-liance -trust me once more- Chapter01:[RE] (released in August 2004 by EYE-dentity): "RE-liance "side-b"" (opening theme)
- Saika (released by Hanakojika): "Saika ~negai~" (theme song)
- ALiBAT (released on August 13, 2006, by PROJECT YNP): "Steps A Waltz" (opening theme), "FareWell" (ending theme)
- Koumajō Densetsu SCARLET SYMPHONY ORIGINAL SOUND TRACK (released by Frontier Aja) "Kirisome no Amuneijia" (霧染めのアムネイジア) (theme song)
- Fushigi no Gensokyo (released by AQUA STYLE) "another face" (ending theme)
- REBIRTH OF MIND (released by Kakusan Fuudou): "Futatsu Boshi" (ending theme)
- Koumajō Densetsu II: Stranger's Requiem (released on December 30, 2010, by Frontier Aja): "afraid" (opening theme)
