= Jimoto no Ijimekko-tachi ni Shikaeshi Shiyōto Shitara, Betsu no Tatakai ga Hajimatta =

Japanese manga series

- First tankōbon volume cover

地元のいじめっ子達に仕返ししようとしたら、別の戦いが始まった。
- Genre: Romantic comedy
- Manga
- Written by: Kengo Matsumoto
- Published by: Kodansha
- Imprint: Sirius KC
- Magazine: Suiyōbi no Sirius
- Original run: March 7, 2023 – present
- Volumes: 9
- Anime television series
- Directed by: Chihiro Kumano
- Written by: Kazuho Hyodo
- Studio: Gekkou
- Original run: 2027 – scheduled

Jimoto no Ijimekko-tachi ni Shikaeshi Shiyōto Shitara, Betsu no Tatakai ga Hajimatta (地元のいじめっ子達に仕返ししようとしたら、別の戦いが始まった。; lit. 'When Trying to Get Back at the Hometown Bullies, Another Battle Began') is a Japanese manga series written and illustrated by Kengo Matsumoto. It was originally published as a webcomic on Matsumoto's Twitter account in October 2022. It later began serialization on the Nico Nico Seiga website under Kodansha's Suiyōbi no Sirius brand in March 2023. An anime television series adaptation produced by Gekkou is set to premiere in 2027.

== Plot ==
The story follows Kotarō Hinode, who transfers to Ginsen Academy High School to get revenge on three childhood acquaintances, Kanae Oborozuki, Akira Mikazuki and Shigure Mangetsu, who tormented him with various punishment games in the past. Although Kotarō believed his former bullies were boys, he discovers upon arriving that they have grown into three beautiful girls who each develop an intense crush on him.

== Characters ==
Akira Mikazuki (三日月アキラ, Mikazuki Akira)
Voiced by: Kaori Maeda
Kanae Oborozuki (朧月カナエ, Oborozuki Kanae)
Voiced by: Yūko Natsuyoshi

== Media ==
=== Manga ===
Written and illustrated by Kengo Matsumoto, Jimoto no Ijimekko-tachi ni Shikaeshi Shiyōto Shitara, Betsu no Tatakai ga Hajimatta was originally published as a webcomic on Matsumoto's Twitter account on October 1, 2022. It was later acquired by Kodansha and began serialization on the Nico Nico Seiga website under its Suiyōbi no Sirius brand on March 7, 2023. Its chapters have been compiled into nine tankōbon volumes as of June 2026.

No.	Release date	ISBN
1	August 8, 2023	978-4-06-532523-0
2	November 9, 2023	978-4-06-533499-7
3	March 8, 2024	978-4-06-534762-1
4	July 9, 2024	978-4-06-535963-1
5	November 8, 2024	978-4-06-537394-1
6	March 7, 2025	978-4-06-538699-6
7	August 7, 2025	978-4-06-540290-0
8	January 8, 2026	978-4-06-542070-6
9	June 9, 2026	978-4-06-543746-9
10	December 9, 2026	978-4-06-546032-0

=== Anime ===
On November 20, 2026, an anime television series adaptation was announced. It will be produced by Gekkou and directed by Chihiro Kumano, with Kazuho Hyodo handling series composition and Yusaku Nakamura designing the characters. The series is set to premiere in 2027.

== See also ==
- How to Treat a Lady Knight Right, another manga series by the same author
