= Kaori Maeda =

Japanese voice actress

- 前田 佳織里
- Born: April 25, 1996 (age 30); Kitakyushu, Fukuoka, Japan
- Occupations: Voice actress; singer
- Years active: 2017–present
- Agent: Amuse Inc.
- Notable work: Aikatsu Stars! as Aria Futaba; Honkai: Star Rail as Lingsha; Back Street Girls as Mari Tachibana; Love Live! Nijigasaki High School Idol Club as Shizuku Ōsaka; Kandagawa Jet Girls as Yuzu Midorikawa; Tamayomi as Yomi Takeda; 2.5 Dimensional Seduction as Lilysa Amano
- Height: 147 cm (4 ft 10 in)
- Musical career
- Genres: J-Pop; Anison
- Instrument: Vocals
- Years active: 2023–present
- Labels: Amuse Inc.; A-Sketch
- Website: maedakaori.jp

Kaori Maeda (前田 佳織里, Maeda Kaori; born April 25, 1996) is a Japanese voice actress and singer from Kitakyushu who is affiliated with Amuse. She began her activities in 2016 after passing an audition, and played her first main role as Mari Tachibana in the anime television series Back Street Girls in 2018. She is also known for her roles as Aria Futaba in Aikatsu Stars!, Yomi Takeda in Tamayomi, Shizuku Ōsaka in Love Live! Nijigasaki High School Idol Club, and Lilysa Amano in 2.5 Dimensional Seduction.

== Biography ==
Maeda was born in Kitakyushu on April 25, 1996. As a child she was interested in fantasy, and she would write stories while she was in elementary school. During her high school years, she had an interest in music, and was a member of a band that covered songs by LiSA, Chatmonchy, and other artists. Her interest in voice acting began when she read the manga Voice Over! Seiyu Academy; she was also influenced by her enjoyment of plays from an early age.

In 2016, Maeda participated in a voice acting audition, where she won the grand prize. She began her acting career the following year after becoming affiliated with the talent agency Amuse. Among her earliest roles were Aria Futaba in the anime television series Aikatsu Stars! and Nice Nature in the multimedia franchise Umamusume: Pretty Derby. Nice Nature was the first role she got via an audition. In 2018, she played Mari Tachibana in the anime series Back Street Girls and Selka Zuberg in Sword Art Online: Alicization. In 2019, she played Yuzu Midorikawa in Kandagawa Jet Girls. In 2020, she played Yomi Takeda in the anime series Tamayomi and Shizuku Ōsaka in Love Live! Nijigasaki High School Idol Club.

On November 25, 2022, she made her solo singer debut under Amuse Inc. with her debut single "Hikatta Koin ga Shimesu Hou" (光ったコインが示す方; Where the Glimmering Coin Leads), releasing on March 15, 2023. The song was used at the opening theme song for the anime, Saving 80,000 Gold in Another World for My Retirement. In 2023, she and Miku Itō voiced an instructional video for the Pokémon Home service. In 2024 she voiced Lilysa Amano in 2.5 Dimensional Seduction, also singing the series' ending themes with her co-stars.

On April 27, 2025, she had her first solo concert, "Are You Ready?" at LINE CUBE SHIBUYA.

== Personal life ==
Maeda is ambidextrous. She previously worked part-time at a Mister Donut outlet, and cites "Mister Donut fortune telling" as one of her hobbies.

== Filmography ==
=== Anime ===
2017

- Aikatsu Stars! as Aria Futaba

2018

- Umamusume: Pretty Derby as Nice Nature
- Back Street Girls as Mari Tachibana
- Sword Art Online: Alicization as Selka

2019

- Kemono Friends 2 as Giant Panda
- The Magnificent Kotobuki as Miyuri
- Fruits Basket as Chie
- Kandagawa Jet Girls as Yuzu Midorikawa
- Aikatsu on Parade! as Aria Futaba

2020

- Interspecies Reviewers as Thies
- Tamayomi as Yomi Takeda
- Umayon as Nice Nature
- Love Live! Nijigasaki High School Idol Club as Shizuku Osaka

2021

- Combatants Will Be Dispatched! as Cristoseles Tillis Grace
- Night Head 2041 as Shо̄ko Futami
- Assault Lily Fruits as Kanaho Kon
- The Way of the Househusband as Cheering Child A
- Platinum End as Mimi Yamada

2022

- Miss Kuroitsu from the Monster Development Department as Tōka Kuroitsu
- Love Live! Nijigasaki High School Idol Club 2nd Season as Shizuku Osaka
- Onipan! as Momozono-Momo

2023

- Nijiyon the Animation as Shizuku Osaka
- Don't Toy with Me, Miss Nagatoro 2nd Attack as Orihara
- Saving 80,000 Gold in Another World for My Retirement as Sabine
- I Got a Cheat Skill in Another World and Became Unrivaled in the Real World, Too as Lexia Von Arcelia
- Blue Orchestra as Chika Yonezawa
- Summoned to Another World for a Second Time as Elka
- Tonikawa: Over the Moon for You – High School Days as Jessie Nikotama
- Reign of the Seven Spellblades as Stacy Cornwallis
- I'm Giving the Disgraced Noble Lady I Rescued a Crash Course in Naughtiness as Natalia Evans

2024

- Brave Bang Bravern! as Honoka Suzunagi
- Gushing over Magical Girls as Haruka Hanabishi/Magia Magenta
- Pon no Michi as Nashiko Jippensha
- Nijiyon the Animation 2nd Season as Shizuku Osaka
- 2.5 Dimensional Seduction as Lilysa Amano
- Failure Frame: I Became the Strongest and Annihilated Everything with Low-Level Spells as Itsuki Takao
- Senpai Is an Otokonoko as Konatsu Taiga
- Plus-Sized Elf as Honeda
- The Healer Who Was Banished From His Party, Is, in Fact, the Strongest as Narusena
- The Most Notorious "Talker" Runs the World's Greatest Clan as Lycia Mercedes

2025

- I Got Married to the Girl I Hate Most in Class as Maho Sakuramori
- Medaka Kuroiwa Is Impervious to My Charms as Minami Shirahama
- Übel Blatt as Elsaria
- The Mononoke Lecture Logs of Chuzenji-sensei as Kanna Kusakabe
- I'm the Evil Lord of an Intergalactic Empire! as Liam Sera Banfield (young)
- Apocalypse Bringer Mynoghra as Maria
- Bad Girl as Mizuka Mizutori
- New Saga as Milena
- May I Ask for One Final Thing? as Diana

2026

- An Adventurer's Daily Grind at Age 29 as Natalie
- Chained Soldier 2 as Maia Azuma
- Always a Catch! as Eleonora Casciari
- Ichijyoma Mankitsu Gurashi! as Magical Momorin Gōda
- Uncle's Obsession with Cute Things as Rio Shigeoka

2027

- Otherworldly Munchkin: Let's Speedrun the Dungeon with Only 1 HP! as Liverna Dark
- Jimoto no Ijimekko-tachi ni Shikaeshi Shiyōto Shitara, Betsu no Tatakai ga Hajimatta as Akira Mikazuki

=== Films ===
2021

- Hula Fulla Dance as Ohana Ka'aihue

=== Video games ===
2020

- Kandagawa Jet Girls as Yuzu Midorikawa
- Show by Rock!! as Reppanyo
- Kirara Fantasia as Utsutsu Sumeragi

2021

- Assault Lily: Last Bullet as Kanaho Kon
- Azur Lane as Le Terrible
- Umamusume: Pretty Derby as Nice Nature

2022

- Two Jong Cell!! as Haru Ichinose
- Goddess of Victory: Nikke as Poli

2023

- Dead or Alive Xtreme Venus Vacation as Yukino
- Path to Nowhere as OwO
- Love Live! School Idol Festival 2: Miracle Live! as Shizuku Osaka
- Tower of Fantasy as Yan Miao

2024

- Seifuku Kanojo as Yui Konomi
- Honkai: Star Rail as Lingsha
- Card-en-Ciel as Noir Spruce

2025

- Atelier Yumia: The Alchemist of Memories & the Envisioned Land as Isla von Duerer
- StarSavior as Lacy

2026

- Zenless Zone Zero as Aria
- Azur Lane as Yukino
