= Megami Magazine =

Japanese magazine

Megami Magazine メガミマガジン
- Cover of the December 2024 issue featuring Shinobu Oshino of the Monogatari series
- Categories: Anime, bishōjo, video games
- Frequency: Monthly
- Circulation: 17,300 (Note: "Japan Magazine Publishers Association" stopped publishing circulation figures for this magazine after September 30, 2019.); (July – September 2019)
- First issue: July 1999
- Company: Gakken
- Country: Japan
- Based in: Tokyo
- Language: Japanese
- Website: cho-animedia.jp

Megami Magazine (Japanese: メガミマガジン, Hepburn: Megami Magajin) is a Japanese monthly magazine which focuses on bishōjo characters from anime and Japanese computer and console games, edited by IID and published by Gakken Plus. It is known for having many posters, pinups and large pictures among the articles.

== Overview ==
Megami Magazine was originally released as an extra edition of the anime magazine "Animedia" by Gakken Kenkyusha (later Gakken Holdings). As the anime magazine Anime V (アニメV) was discontinued, the publication began on July 28, 1999, for an independent Megami Magazine to fill the void with a focus on "gal games". Megami Magazine was originally released every odd month on the 28th before it was changed to every even month starting with the February 28, 2000, issue. This did not last long as the magazine was finally switched from a bi-monthly to a monthly basis release starting in November, 2000. During this time the focus of the magazine was shifted from "gal games" to "anime" due to a surge in popularity with "moe" type characters. An after effect from the monthly switch led to the split off of the "Megami Magazine Special" from the main issue of "Animedia" starting in March 2003.

The Gakken Group was reorganized in October 2009 which caused Megami Magazine to briefly come under the umbrella of Gakken Publishing. This was further modified with the merging of Gakken Publishing with Gakken Marketing and others which led to Gakken Plus taking its place. Megami Magazine was converted into e-book format in April 2018 following the digital conversion of "Animedia" and "Voice Actor Animedia". On February 1, 2020, the editing and publishing business was transferred from Gakken Plus to IID along with "Animedia". The former of these two companies still officially releases the magazine under their name Gakken Plus.

== Features ==
=== Adult content ===
Until the April 2005 issue, there was a section introducing adult anime, which included scenes of female characters with their nipples exposed. Some works had posters attached. However, the adult content section has been discontinued.

=== Centerfolds and posters ===
Megami Magazine is unique because each issue is supplemented by more than 20 posters.

=== Girls Avenue ===
"Girls Avenue" was a section in Megami Magazine where an artist was featured and one of their illustrations was included as a pinup poster. As of Megami Magazine volume 150, the "Girls Avenue" section has been discontinued and is now released as a series of art books.

=== Mascot Character ===
Claire Froebel (Voice actor: Reiko Takagi / character design: Masa Shiranagi. The name was decided on by public readers) who is the navigator of the reader's corner "MegaTen!" had appeared in the magazine's TV commercials aired in Magical Girl Lyrical Nanoha A's and became a de facto mascot character of the magazine.

=== Series ===
Title	Creator(s)	First issue	Last issue	Full Serialization
Binchō-tan (manga) びんちょうタン	Takahito Ekusa	November 2003	July 2005	No
Girls und Panzer (4-koma Panzer Vor!) ガールズ＆パンツァー 4コマでパンツァー・フォー！	Yuuma	July 2012	July 2022	Yes
Kotoura-san (Ganbare Kotoura-san!) がんばれ琴浦さん!	Enokizu	December 2012	May 2013	Yes
Magical Girl Lyrical Nanoha (The Movie 1st − The Comics)	Masaki Tsuzuki, Kōji Hasegawa	November 2009	March 2011	Yes
Magical Girl Lyrical Nanoha A's (The Comics) 魔法少女リリカルなのはA's THE COMICS	Masaki Tsuzuki, Kōji Hasegawa	August 2005	January 2006	No
Magical Girl Lyrical Nanoha Strikers (The Comics) 魔法少女リリカルなのはStrikerS THE COMICS	Masaki Tsuzuki, Kōji Hasegawa	November 2006	February 2008	No
Simoun (Simoun Magical Biyūden) シムーンまじかる美勇伝	Wataru Akiduki	August 2006	December 2006	Yes
Yotsunoha (manga) よつのは	Haikuo Soft, Bow Ditama	March 2008	December 2008	Yes

== Sister magazines & special editions ==
Along with the main Megami Magazine line, Gakken also publishes several other titles using the same name or content.

Name	Founded	Defunct	Features	Short summary
Megami Bunko (メガミ文庫)	2004		Light novels	Magami Bunko was established in December 2004, and is a light novel label that is aimed at a young adult male readership.
Megami Magazine (English ed)	2007	2007	Various	On October 31, 2007 an English version of the 5th volume of Megami Magazine Deluxe was released in the United States by Digital Manga Publishing. This was the first and only English language Megami Magazine to be published.
Megami Magazine Creators (メガミマガジンクリエイターズ)	2004	Unknown	Artwork	Showcases the artwork of individual artists typically involved with manga, games, and anime. All of the illustrations featured are printed full-page, but there are no pinup posters. It consists of original works by illustrators and re-recorded interviews from the magazine "Girl's Avenue".
Megami Magazine DELUXE (メガミマガジンDELUXE)	2002		Prints	Megami Magazine Deluxe is published quarterly and features full-page prints of illustrations found in the regular Megami Magazine volumes.
Megami Magazine RX (メガミマガジンRX)	2011		Ecchi	An extra edition issue that is a collection of female characters only in underwear, bathing and semi-nude, images from the main story that are copyrighted. Due to the nature of the content, the magazine is more explicit than the main edition of Megami Magazine.
Megami Magazine Special (メガミマガジンSpecial)	2000		Anime	This was originally released between Volumes 8 and 9 of the main Megami Magazine issue. When publication of the main magazine was changed from bi-monthly to monthly, a lot of information on gal games was reduced. The structure of the magazine had adjusted its focus on anime articles.
Comic Megami Magazine (コミックメガミマガジン)	2004	2005	Manga	Comic Megami Magazine was an original four-panel magazine. Gakken had published manga magazines such as "Monthly Comic NORA" and "Comic Pocke" in the past, however they were all discontinued. In August 2005, the comic's title was changed to "Comic Chirality" (see below), after being completely remastered.
Comic Chirality (コミックキラリティー)	2005	2006	Manga	Inheriting some of the serialization from "Comic Megami Magazine", the amount of non-four panel articles was increased. The illustration essays commemorating the publication of the first volume mobilized the entire network of people from 'Animedia' and 'Monthly Comic NORA'. Notable people involved include Yoshikazu Yasuhiko, Takeshi Okazaki, and Satoshi Urushihara.

== Radio ==
In commemoration of the 100th issue of the magazine in September 2008, the internet radio program "HAMIDASE! Megami Magazine RADIO!!" was broadcast in August the same year. From October 2009, regular broadcasting started on Radio Kansai and Nippon Cultural Broadcasting's digital radio "Cho! A & G +". The program was remastered to "Hamiraji!!" since April 2012, but it ended on October 4, 2015.

== See also ==
- Anime magazine
- Animedia
- Voice actor Animedia -The composition of the magazine is based on this magazine.
- Daughter TYPE
- Moe
- Girl love
- Fictosexual
- Nijikon
