= Sol Press =

Defunct American publishing company

- Status: Defunct (Note: Under California law, a business that is suspended/forfeited can not legally close or dissolve, until the matter that lead to suspension/forfeit is resolved. The business is also legally prohibited from engaging in business operations, such as selling goods.)
- Founded: February 2017; 8 years ago
- Founder: Michael Valdez
- Defunct: October 2021; 3 years ago
- Country of origin: United States
- Headquarters location: Orange County, California
- Publication types: Visual novels Light novels Manga
- Owner(s): Michael Valdez
- Official website: https://solpress.co/

Sol Press was an American publishing company that focused on localizing Japanese visual novels, light novels, and manga. Located in Orange County, California, it was formed in 2017. In October 2021, it was prohibited from doing business in the state of California for non-payment of taxes.

The company had licensed ten visual novels, nine light novels, and six manga for release on the Steam and Kadokawa's BookWalker platforms.

== History ==
Sol Press was founded in February 2017 by Michael Valdez, who was unhappy with the slow translation processes and products of other video game localization companies. For the company's titles, Valdez emphasized the importance of not charging players for patches as he believed it was unnecessary and an unpopular business tactic. Although Sol Press-licensed visual novels are censored when released on Steam, free patches to receive adult content in the original games are downloadable on external websites.

In September 2017, Sol Press created a Kickstarter fundraiser to support the localization of the Haikuo Soft visual novel/eroge Sakura Sakura. Despite Sakura Sakura's age and obscurity, Sol Press elected to pick up the game following positive feedback from the staff. Funding for the Kickstarter was completed a month later. It was released on Steam on November 19, 2018. A second Haikuo Soft visual novel, Yotsunoha, saw a Western release on July 13, 2019, on Sol Press' website after it was denied publishing by Steam.

Joined by MiKandi Japan, another campaign was launched on December 1, 2017, to fund the Laplacian VN Newton and the Apple Tree. After just three days, it had already reached its goal of $31,200. It was released on August 15. Later in the year, DareSora: Tears for an Unknown Sky was localized and released on September 14.

In April 2018, it began expansion into licensing light novels with the books Strongest Gamer – Let's Play in Another World and Battle Divas – The Incorruptible Battle Blossom Princess. The two were digitally released on April 30. At Kumoricon 2018 in Oregon, Sol Press announced the creation of Project Hyourin, a digital distribution client for works licensed by the company. It also formed an alliance with Japanese game publisher Entergram to release visual novels on consoles in North America.

On May 24, 2019, Sol Press announced a partnership with Kadokawa Corporation to release light novels and manga on Kadokawa's BookWalker platform.

The company was forfeited by the California FTB for failure to pay taxes in late October 2021. Citing requests from the original Japanese publishers, BookWalker removed series licensed by Sol Press on February 21, 2022.

== Licensed works ==
=== Visual novels ===
Title	Developer	Release date	Ref
Newton and the Apple Tree	Laplacian	August 15, 2018	
DareSora: Tears for an Unknown Sky	Anagram	August 31, 2018	
Sakura Sakura	Haikuo Soft	November 19, 2018	
Under One Wing	Harmorise	February 28, 2019	
Yotsunoha	Haikuo Soft	July 13, 2019	
Onii-Kiss: Onii-Chan Where Is My Kiss?	Tinkle Position	September 24, 2019	
My Fair Princess	PeasSoft	November 8, 2019	
Choose Your Mistress	PeasSoft	N/A	
Love Among the Sunflowers	More	N/A	
Irotoridori no Sekai	Favorite	N/A	

=== Light novels ===
Title	Author	Illustrator	Release date	Ref
Battle Divas Vol. 1: The Incorruptible Battle Blossom Princess	Kouka Kishine	Nekonabeao	April 30, 2018	
Strongest Gamer: Let's Play in Another World Vol. 1	Yuki Shinobu	Itsuwa Katou	April 30, 2018	
Battle Divas Vol. 2: The Unshakable Winter Blossom Princess	Kouka Kishine	Nekonabeao	April 12, 2019	
Strongest Gamer: Let’s Play in Another World Vol. 2	Yuki Shinobu	Itsuwa Katou	April 12, 2019	
Redefining the META at VRMMO Academy Vol. 1	Hayaken	Hika Akita	April 26, 2019	
Saving 80,000 Gold in Another World for my Retirement Vol. 1	FUNA	Touzai	April 26, 2019	
Battle Divas Vol. 3: The Unyielding Twin Blossom Princess	Kouka Kishine	Nekonabeao	May 17, 2019	
Why Shouldn't a Detestable Demon Lord Fall in Love?! Vol. 1	Nekomata Nuko	Teffish	September 20, 2019	
Chivalry of a Failed Knight Vol. 1	Riku Misora	Won	November 16, 2019	
Chivalry of a Failed Knight Vol. 2	Riku Misora	Won	November 16, 2019	
Chivalry of a Failed Knight Vol. 3	Riku Misora	Won	November 16, 2019	
Why Shouldn’t a Detestable Demon Lord Fall in Love?! Vol. 2	Nekomata Nuko	Teffish	May 1, 2020	
Redefining the META at VRMMO Academy Vol. 2	Hayaken	Hika Akita	June 15, 2020	
Chivalry of a Failed Knight Vol. 4	Riku Misora	Won	July 6, 2020	
Why Shouldn’t a Detestable Demon Lord Fall in Love?! Vol. 3	Nekomata Nuko	Teffish	July 20, 2020	
Redefining the META at VRMMO Academy Vol. 3	Hayaken	Hika Akita	August 17, 2020	
Saving 80,000 Gold in Another World for my Retirement Vol. 2	FUNA	Touzai	December 14, 2020	
Chivalry of a Failed Knight Vol. 5	Riku Misora	Won	December 28, 2020	
I Surrendered My Sword for a New Life Vol. 1	Shin Kouduki	Necömi	December 28, 2020	
Let This Grieving Soul Retire! Woe is the Weakling Who Leads the Strongest Party Vol. 1	Tsukikage	Chyko	December 28, 2020	
The Game Master has Logged In to Another World Vol. 1	Akatsuki	Merontomari/Yuui	December 28, 2020	

=== Manga ===
Title	Author	Manga adaptation	Release date	Ref
Harem Royale ~When the Game Ends~ Vol. 1	Ryukishi07	Yukari Higa	January 7, 2019	
Saving 80,000 Gold in Another World for my Retirement Vol. 1	FUNA	Keisuke Motoe	January 7, 2019	
How to Treat a Lady Knight Right Vol. 1	Kengo Matsumoto	N/A	July 6, 2019	
The Ride-On King Vol. 1	Yasushi Baba	N/A	July 6, 2019	
Harem Royale ~When the Game Ends~ Vol. 2	Ryukishi07	Yukari Higa	December 16, 2020	
Is the Order a Rabbit? Vol. 1	Koi	N/A	December 16, 2020	
Blend S Vol. 1	Miyuki Nakayama	N/A	December 23, 2020	
