= Saving 80,000 Gold in Another World for My Retirement =

Japanese light novel series and its adaptations

- Cover of the first light novel volume, featuring Mitsuha Yamano

老後に備えて異世界で8万枚の金貨を貯めます (Rōgo ni Sonaete Isekai de 8-Man-Mai no Kinka o Tamemasu)
- Genre: Isekai
- Novel series
- Written by: FUNA
- Published by: Shōsetsuka ni Narō
- Original run: November 2, 2015 – present
- Light novel
- Written by: FUNA
- Illustrated by: Tōzai
- Published by: Kodansha
- English publisher: NA: Sol Press (former) Kodansha USA
- Imprint: Kodansha Ranobe Books
- Original run: June 29, 2017 – present
- Volumes: 11
- Manga
- Written by: FUNA
- Illustrated by: Keisuke Motoe
- Published by: Kodansha
- English publisher: NA: Sol Press (former) Kodansha USA
- Magazine: Suiyōbi no Sirius
- Original run: June 14, 2017 – present
- Volumes: 15
- Anime television series
- Directed by: Hiroshi Tamada
- Written by: Akihiko Inari
- Music by: Tetsuya Takahashi
- Studio: Felix Film
- Licensed by: Crunchyroll
- Original network: ANN (ABC TV, TV Asahi), BS11, AT-X
- Original run: January 8, 2023 – March 26, 2023
- Episodes: 12
- icon

Saving 80,000 Gold in Another World for My Retirement (Japanese: 老後に備えて異世界で8万枚の金貨を貯めます, Hepburn: Rōgo ni Sonaete Isekai de 8-Man-Mai no Kinka o Tamemasu) is a Japanese light novel series written by FUNA. The series originated on the Shōsetsuka ni Narō website, before being published in print with illustrations by Tōzai by Kodansha beginning in June 2017. As of May 2026, eleven volumes have been released. A manga adaptation, illustrated by Keisuke Motoe, began serialization on the Niconico-based Suiyōbi no Sirius platform in June 2017. As of July 2026, the manga's individual chapters have been collected into fifteen volumes. An anime television series adaptation produced by Felix Film aired from January to March 2023.

== Plot ==
Mitsuha Yamano is a high school orphan with little money from inheritance. Her college application was rejected and she lost her entire family in an accident. After being pushed off a cliff, Mitsuha accidentally gained the ability to teleport and travel between Earth and a medieval world from an interdimensional entity. Worried if she ever were to lose this ability and get stuck in either globe without retirement funds, she makes it her goal to exploit her power to exchange currency, jewelry, and Earth products while in the course of her exploration of the new world.

== Characters ==
Mitsuha Yamano (山野 光波, Yamano Mitsuha)
Voiced by: Rika Nagae (Japanese); Trina Nishimura (English)
A young high school graduate who lost her parents and beloved older brother in an accident. After being pushed off a cliff, she discovers that she has accidentally gained the ability to travel between two worlds, the ability to understand and speak the alternate world's language, and vast regenerative abilities from an interdimensional entity. She can also take objects and other people with her at will. Using this new advantage, she begins importing modern items from Earth to make her way in the other world and earn her own retirement funds. She also opens a store to serve the other world's residents. In the other world, she claims to be a noble named Mitsuha von Yamano and that she fled her home country due to a succession crisis. She is good friends with Colette and Sabine. Most people in the other world refer to her as the "Messenger of Lightning", which she doesn't enjoy. She soon becomes a viscountess and gains ownership of a domain.
Colette (コレット, Koretto)
Voiced by: Rika Tachibana (Japanese); Marianne Bray (English)
A forest farmer's daughter who becomes Mitsuha's first new friend in the other world. She was the first person to discover Mitsuha after she arrived in the other world, and while they temporarily had to separate after Mitsuha leaves her village, they are later reunited and move to a mansion located in a domain that is now owned by Mitsuha herself, where she serves as Mitsuha's retainer. She possesses great strength as when she hugs someone, it causes immense pain.
Sabine (サビーネ, Sabīne)
Voiced by: Kaori Maeda (Japanese); Sarah Wiedenheft (English)
A princess who meets Mitsuha after visiting her store. A group of thugs tried to kidnap her for human trafficking, but Mitsuha and the royal guards save her. Like many others, she is fascinated by the various forms of technology that Mitsuha transported in from Japan. Like Colette, she is a close friend to Mitsuha, though more obsessive. She also treats Mitsuha like an elder sister.
Takeshi Yamano (⼭野 剛史, Yamano Takeshi)
Voiced by: Jun Fukuyama (Japanese); Anthony DiMascio (English)
Mitsuha's older otaku brother, whom she has looked up to until his untimely death. She remembers him in frequent flashbacks and takes his smart advice to heart after she ends up in the other world.
Elinu (エリーヌ, Erīnu)
Voiced by: Ruriko Aoki (Japanese); Erin Kelly Noble (English)
Colette's mother.
Tobias (トビアス, Tobiasu)
Voiced by: Yūji Kameyama (Japanese); Travis Mullenix (English)
Colette's father.
"It" ("それ", "Sore")
Voiced by: Kenyu Horiuchi (Japanese); Randy Pearlman (English)
A nameless world-wandering being composed of mental energy, who appears to Mitsuha in the form of a lucky cat statue her brother had gifted to her. When she was falling off a cliff, Mitsuha's will inadvertently latched onto that entity's essence, ripping out and appropriating some of it, which gave her new world-travelling abilities. It also gave her the ability to understand the other world's language before leaving.
Claus Von Bozes
A feudal lord who is the ruler of the Bozes County. He is Iris' husband and Alexis, Theodore, and Beatrice's father. He soon becomes Mitsuha's adoptive father upon learning that she is orphaned.
Iris Von Bozes
Claus' wife and Alexis, Theodore, and Beatrice's mother, and Mitsuha's adoptive mother. She has a demeaner side, which scares Mitsuha.
Alexis Von Bozes
One of Claus and Iris' sons, Theodore and Beatrice's brother, and Mitsuha's adoptive brother.
Theodore Von Bozes
One of Claus and Iris' sons, Alexis and Beatrice's brother, and Mitsuha's adoptive brother.
Beatrice Von Bozes
Claus and Iris' daughter, Alexis and Theodore's sister, and Mitsuha's adoptive sister. Although she is taller than Mitsuha, she is really younger than her.
Stefan
A butler who works for the Bozes family.
Vincent Von Reiner
The owner of a mansion in the Capital City. He is Amalia's husband and Adelaide's father.
Amalia Von Reiner
Vincent's wife and Adelaide's mother.
Adelaide Von Reiner
Vincent and Amalia's daughter. Mitsuha once helped her throw a ball in her honor using Earth technology.
Marcel
A chef who works at Vincent's mansion.
Britta
A maid who works at Vincent's mansion. She and her fellow maids are Mitsuha's first customers. During their first meeting, they assumed that she is a witch due to them being unfamiliar with her modern products.
Carla
A maid who works at Vincent's mansion. She and her fellow maids are Mitsuha's first customers. During their first meeting, they assumed that she is a witch due to them being unfamiliar with her modern products.
Anke
A maid who works at Vincent's mansion. She and her fellow maids are Mitsuha's first customers. During their first meeting, they assumed that she is a witch due to them being unfamiliar with her modern products.
Nelson Adler
The arrogant owner of the Adler Trading Company. He attempts to gain control of Mitsuha's shop and take custody of Mitsuha and Sabine. His scheme is soon exposed and Sahr threatens to ruin him if he tries to mess with Mitsuha's business. The king also cuts ties with his company for trying to take possession of his daughter. This forces him to retire and shut down his company.
Bernd
The owner of a restaurant, who is threatened by a rival restaurant owned by a cruel rich man. His business is saved by Mitsuha.
Stella
Bernd's wife, who also works as a waitress at his restaurant.
Aleena
Bernd and Stella's daughter. It was she who asked Mitsuha for help in saving her family's restaurant. She has feelings for Anel.
Anel
An apprentice who works at Bernd's restaurant as a chef. He has a crush on Aleena.
Sven
A swordsman and the leader of a group of four mercenaries.
Zepp
A spearman and one of the four mercenaries. He seems to be a pervert.
Gritt
A swordswoman and one of the four mercenaries. She was once hired as a waitress.
Ilze
An archer and one of the four mercenaries. She was once hired as a waitress.
Sahr
The chancellor of the kingdom who is very supportive of Mitsuha. He is also ordered by the king to find out about Mitsuha's past and true intentions.
Marquis Aiblinger
The commander of a group of soldiers opposing an army from the Alder Empire. An assassin tried to kill him, but he is saved by Mitsuha and Alexis.
Ruhen
Sabine's brother. He is not as troublesome as his sister.
Baron Turk
A baron who once attended Adelaide's ball. He has a snooty personality.
Iaps
An assassin who is hunted by the four mercenaries. He took refuge in Mitsuha's shop. When Griit tracked him there, he tried to take Mitsuha as a hostage to avoid capture, but the latter retaliated by spraying in his eyes. He is soon captured by the mercenaries after he tried to escape. He is said to have killed his master.

== Media ==
=== Light novel ===
Written by FUNA, the light novel began publication on the novel posting website Shōsetsuka ni Narō on November 2, 2015. The series was later acquired by Kodansha, who published the series with illustrations by Tōzai under their Kodansha Ranobe Books imprint beginning on June 29, 2017. As of May 2026, eleven volumes have been released.

In November 2018, Sol Press announced that they licensed the light novel for English publication. They released two volumes before going defunct. After Sol Press lost the rights, Kodansha USA announced at Anime Expo 2022 that they licensed the series for English publication.

==== Volumes ====
NOTE: After SP went defunct, KUSA re-translated JP Vol 1 and JP Vol 2 as Vol 1. Subsequent KUSA volumes are numbered off by one from the JP originals.

No.	Original release date	Original ISBN	English release date	English ISBN
1	June 29, 2017	978-4-06-365027-3	April 26, 2019 (SP); April 18, 2023 (KUSA)	978-1-64-729210-2
2	December 1, 2017	978-4-06-365045-7	December 14, 2020 (SP); April 18, 2023 (KUSA)	978-1-64-729210-2
3	May 2, 2018	978-4-06-511899-3	July 18, 2023 (KUSA) as Vol 2	978-1-64-729211-9
4	January 9, 2019	978-4-06-514550-0	November 28, 2023 (KUSA) as Vol 3	978-1-64-729273-7
5	August 30, 2019	978-4-06-517347-3	April 23, 2024 (KUSA) as Vol 4	978-1-64-729313-0
6	July 2, 2021	978-4-06-519781-3	July 23, 2024 (KUSA) as Vol 5	978-1-64-729331-4
7	August 2, 2022	978-4-06-528788-0	October 15, 2024 (KUSA) as Vol 6	978-1-64-729365-9
8	March 2, 2023	978-4-06-531306-0	February 25, 2025 (KUSA) as Vol 7	978-1-64-729405-2
9	March 1, 2024	978-4-06-534789-8	June 24, 2025 (KUSA) as Vol 8	978-1-64-729442-7
10	January 31, 2025	978-4-06-538569-2	January 6, 2026 (KUSA) as Vol 9	978-1-64-729503-5
11	May 1, 2026	978-4-06-543344-7	—	—

=== Manga ===
A manga adaptation, illustrated by Keisuke Motoe, began serialization on Kodansha's Niconico-based Suiyōbi no Sirius manga service on June 14, 2017. As of July 2026, the series' individual chapters have been collected into fifteen tankōbon volumes.

In November 2018, Sol Press announced that they also licensed the manga adaptation for English publication. They released one volume in 2019. After Sol Press went defunct, Kodansha USA announced at San Diego Comic-Con 2022 that they also licensed the manga adaptation for English publication.

==== Volumes ====
No.	Original release date	Original ISBN	English release date	English ISBN
1	December 1, 2017	978-4-06-510503-0	January 7, 2019 (SP, digital); September 27, 2019 (SP, physical); June 13, 2023 (KUSA)	978-1-9-48-83805-4 (SP); 978-1-64-651819-7 (KUSA)
2	May 9, 2018	978-4-06-511383-7	August 29, 2023	978-1-64-651820-3
3	January 9, 2019	978-4-06-514100-7	October 31, 2023	978-1-64-651847-0
4	May 9, 2019	978-4-06-515415-1	December 12, 2023	978-1-64-651848-7
5	December 4, 2019	978-4-06-517801-0	February 13, 2024	978-1-64-651849-4
6	June 9, 2020	978-4-06-519726-4	April 16, 2024	978-1-64-651850-0
7	December 9, 2020	978-4-06-521588-3	June 25, 2024	978-1-64-651851-7
8	June 9, 2021	978-4-06-523515-7	August 13, 2024	978-1-64-651852-4
9	December 9, 2021	978-4-06-526108-8	February 18, 2025	978-1-64-651853-1
10	August 8, 2022	978-4-06-528783-5	April 22, 2025	978-1-64-651948-4
11	February 9, 2023	978-4-06-530569-0	June 17, 2025	979-8-88-877002-3
12	December 7, 2023	978-4-06-533826-1	August 19, 2025	979-8-88-877275-1
13	October 8, 2024	978-4-06-537082-7	November 18, 2025	979-8-88-877546-2
14	July 9, 2025	978-4-06-539870-8	March 17, 2026	979-8-88-877814-2
15	July 9, 2026	978-4-06-543781-0	—	—

=== Anime ===
On July 26, 2022, an anime television series adaptation was announced. It is produced by Felix Film and directed by Hiroshi Tamada, with Akihiko Inari writing the scripts and Yūki Fukuchi designing the characters. It aired from January 8 to March 26, 2023, on ABC and TV Asahi's Animazing!!! programming block. The opening theme song is "Hikatta Coin ga Shimesu Kata" (光ったコインが示す方; "How the Shining Coin Is Revealed") by Kaori Maeda, while the ending theme song is "Yappari Economy" (やっぱりエコノミー; "As Expected, It's Economy") by YABI×YABI. At Anime NYC 2022, Crunchyroll announced that they licensed the series.

==== Episodes ====
No.	Title	Directed by (Note: Information is taken from the ending credits of each episode.)	Written by	Storyboarded by	Original release date
1	"Mitsuha Goes to Another World"; Transliteration: "Mitsuha, Isekai ni Iku" (Japanese: ミツハ、異世界に行く)	Takashi Kobayashi	Akihiko Inari	Hiroshi Tamada	January 8, 2023
Mitsuha Yamano loses her parents and otaku older brother in an accident. She gets in a fight with bullies and is pushed off a cliff, but lands safely and, by visualizing what her brother would say, realizes she has traveled to an alternate world, and wanders until she is found and taken in by a girl named Collette. Finding it has a medieval nature, Mitsuha tries to get used to this new world, though she is unable to understand the native language. While foraging, she and Collette are attacked by wolves, only for Mitsuha to abruptly return to Japan. Realizing she can travel between worlds, she grabs several different objects from her house, travels back, and weaponizes them to kill the wolves before falling unconscious and finding herself in an astral plane-like area. She is confronted by an interdimensional being taking the form of the lucky cat statue that her brother gave her, who explains that when she fell off the cliff, her strong will to live permanently stole some of his power, so she can now travel between worlds and heal all injuries. He grants Mitsuha the ability to understand the alternate world's language and leaves, promising to visit in a few millennia. Once she regains conscious, Collette's father pays Mitsuha gold for the wolf carcasses, and Mitsuha realizes how to use her power to become wealthy enough to retire in both worlds. She thus makes it her goal to amass a fortune of 2 billion Yen, roughly 80,000 gold coins.
2	"Kingdom of Ambitions"; Transliteration: "Yabō no Ōkoku" (Japanese: 野望の王国)	Michita Shiraishi	Akihiko Inari	Yumiko Ishii	January 15, 2023
Mitsuha begins identifying ways common Japanese products would be profitable if brought to the new world. She claims to the people of Collette's village that she came from a faraway land and got separated from her party. Learning that the feudal lord, Claus Von Bozes, is a good man, Mitsuha decides to make her fortune in the royal capital. Collette is upset that she has to leave, but Mitsuha promises Collette that she will return one day. Using her powers, Mitsuha teleports to Japan and converts all her assets to cash, then to South America to meet Wolf Fang, a private military company, where she purchases guns and training in shooting and self-defense, and also negotiates a deal with the commander to exchange the other world's gold coins with Earth money. After teleporting back to the other world with a motorcycle, narrowly avoiding being spotted by a group of people, to get within walking distance of the village ruled by Claus Von Bozes, and researching medieval feudal societies to decide what products to buy and sell for the easiest profit, she decides she is ready and enters the village.
3	"Mitsuha Plays the Part!"; Transliteration: "Mitsuha, Enjiru!" (Japanese: ミツハ、演じる！)	Ryōji Tanaka	Shin'ya Murakami	Hatsuki Tsuji	January 22, 2023
Mitsuha is prevented from meeting Claus without an invitation, so she fabricates a meeting with his sons by feigning being hit by their carriage using firecrackers. Having made a good first impression, Mitsuha gifts Claus a Swiss Army knife, with which he is instantly intrigued. At dinner at his mansion, she meets Claus' wife Iris, sons Alexis and Theodore, and daughter Beatrice. Mitsuha claims to have fled her country to allow her beloved younger brother to inherit, avoiding a succession dispute, and intends to support herself as a merchant, starting by selling a medium quality pearl necklace. However, Iris reveals pearls are so rare that an entire necklace of them would be an instant national treasure no amount of gold could buy. Taking pity on her ignorance, Iris agrees to hide the necklace from the public in exchange for enough gold to open a general store in the capital. Mitsuha also sells Alexis and Theodore a pocket knife, and the family continues to be impressed with her innovative business sense, and she finds herself reminded of her own parents and brother, causing her to cry. The next day, Claus sends her to the capital in his carriage with a letter of official sponsorship and an invitation to visit them again anytime.
4	"General Store Mitsuha"; Transliteration: "Zakkaya Mitsuha" (Japanese: 雑貨屋ミツハ)	Tsutomu Yabuki	Ayumu Hisao	Chihiro Kumano	January 29, 2023
Mitsuha reaches the capital, leases a shop and fills it with Japanese products. Unfortunately, after two days of waiting, her products are so foreign her first customers, a trio of young women, aren't interested, and only stay for a shampoo demonstration and lunch which, despite being exotic to them, are just cheap boil-in-the-bag meals. Seeing showers, a gas cooker, and multiple different meals emerging from a single pot, they fear Mitsuha might be a witch. Regardless, Mitsuha sells shampoo, moisturizer and jewelry, including complimentary chocolates. The customers, maids in a mansion, show the chocolate to Chef Marcel, who is so impressed he shows his employers, Viscount Reiner and his wife Amalia. They are so intrigued by the tale of being served fresh fish for lunch, despite being a ten-day journey from the ocean, they demand that Marcel investigates. From Marcel's questions, Mitsuha realizes she messed up by stocking fresh fish, but still sells Marcel a professional chef knife. Marcel reveals it will soon be the debutante ball of Reiner and Amalia's daughter Adelaide, which absolutely must be a success, so he asks Mitsuha provide fresh fish so he can impress the noble guests. Sensing an enormous potential for profit, Mitsuha agrees to help cater the entire ball, for the right fee.
5	"Producing a Socialite!"; Transliteration: "Ojōsama o Purodyūsu!" (Japanese: お嬢様をプロデュース！)	Shō Hamada	Ayumu Hisao	Hatsuki Tsuji	February 5, 2023
Reiner and Amalia sample Mitsuha's food for the ball and are so impressed they even agree to pay her to provide Adelaide's dress, jewellery, the alcohol and plan the schedule of entertainment. Amalia also purchases shampoo and body-wash. Mitsuha spends days teaching Marcel recipes for party foods focusing on fresh fish, even blindfolding Adelaide to secretly teleport her to a professional dressmaker on Earth. The ball begins, and Adelaide stuns in an exquisite dress highlighted by special effects from a projector on Mitsuha's laptop. Mitsuha panics when she encounters Claus and Iris, who brought their sons Alexis and Theodore as potential suitors for Adelaide. Iris had been concerned Mitsuha's shop was closed, but is relieved she was just busy arranging the ball. Disaster strikes as the guests eat so much fish, the kitchen completely runs out. To avoid embarrassing Adelaide, Mitsuha deploys the dessert of biscuits, sweets, cake and alcohol to give Marcel time to prepare vast servings of French fries. The ball is such a success that many nobles demand their sons fight to marry Adelaide as soon as possible. Mitsuha's food enters high demand and becomes known in noble society as Yamano Style Cuisine.
6	"Beatrice the Charmer"; Transliteration: "Onedari Beatorisu-chan" (Japanese: おねだりベアトリスちゃん)	Michita Shiraishi	Shin'ya Murakami	Hiroshi Mita	February 12, 2023
The chef to Baron Turk, a guest at the ball, barges into Mitsuha's store and demands fresh fish as the Baron is no longer satisfied with his cooking. Mitsuha insists she only provides fish on special order, so he almost attacks her. Iris and Claus intervene and promise to report his actions to the Baron. Iris drags Mitsuha back to their home for dinner, as she has not visited in weeks. Beatrice insists Mitsuha cater her debutante ball in two years time. Claus is fascinated by the food and special effects and Mitsuha is forced to lie about where she gets her products, stating that her friends transported them to her using fast moving boats and smuggled them into the city. Mitsuha is surprised when Beatrice reveals girls become engaged at ten years old and married by fifteen. As a high school graduate, Mitsuha is already older than this. Beatrice asks Mitsuha what type of man she would marry and Mitsuha quickly realizes she was sent by her family, who were plotting to get Mitsuha married and find out more about her. In response, she has Beatrice spread false information to misled her family, threatening to cancel her ball if she doesn't comply. Days later, a wanted murderer hides in Mitsuha's store. A bounty hunter finds him and the killer tries to take Mitsuha as a hostage, but she blinds him with a spray bottle. As the two leave, she goes after them, as the killer still has a knife that he stole from her shop. The killer is soon apprehended by the bounty hunter and three others (revealed to be the same people that Mitsuha saw earlier), who are revealed to be from the Mercenary Guild. Sensing an interesting possibility for some RPG experiences, Mitsuha asks if she can hire the mercenaries for a job.
7	"The Adventure of Mitsuha"; Transliteration: "Mitsuha no Daibōken" (Japanese: ミツハの大冒険)	Masayuki Iimura	Shin'ya Murakami	Hatsuki Tsuji	February 19, 2023
Mitsuha asks the mercenaries; swordsman Sven, spearman Zepp, swordswoman Gritt, and archer Ilze, to take her hunting, and returns to Japan for modern camping equipment and a crossbow. Mitsuha learns that currently mercenaries are struggling for jobs and many have resorted to banditry. The group are amazed by Mitsuha's tent, lighter to start fires and canned soup, so Mitsuha considers providing supplies in bulk to the guild to improve working conditions. She attempts to bathe while wearing a bikini, but is scolded by Gritt and Ilze since bikinis don't exist so by their standards, Mitsuha is considered a nudist due to them mistaking her bikini for her underwear. Mitsuha is attacked by a boar that she kills with her pistol, but inserts crossbow bolts into the bullet holes, preferring the others to not learn about guns. Returning home, Mitsuha uses a swimsuit magazine to prove bikinis are normal in her country and is surprised by their reaction to photographs. Zepp wants to buy the magazine, but Mitsuha refuses to sell it and he is quickly silenced by Gritt. Wondering if art will sell, Mitsuha uses her teleporting power to teleport the shapes of famous statues out of solid rock, but none of them look right. She is able to sell the statues as demons to repel evil spirits, but feels no sense of accomplishment for her lack of artistic skill.
8	"Mitsuha Visits the Royal Palace"; Transliteration: "Mitsuha, Oshiro e Iku" (Japanese: ミツハ、お城へ行く)	Yūta Takamura	Ayumu Hisao	Hatsuki Tsuji	February 26, 2023
A young girl named Sabine visits the shop that Mitsuha suspects to be a princess. A group of thugs kidnap the girl for human trafficking, but Mitsuha subdues one of them with a stun-gun and scares the others with a real gun just as the guards arrive and capture the thugs, scolding Sabine for sneaking off. Mitsuha (who nicknames herself the Messenger of Lightning) is summoned by the king, who is grateful that she rescued his daughter Sabine and intends to lecture her later for wondering out of the castle. Seeing that the King and his chancellor Sahr have bad vision, Mitsuha sells them reading glasses and subtly informs the king she can't be bribed to do his bidding. The king is impressed, but has Mitsuha investigated. Days later, Nelson Adler, owner of Adler Trading Company with a royal business warrant, threatens Mitsuha to hand over her shop and take possession of her. Mitsuha arranges to meet Nelson later to sign the documents. She also arranges for Sabine and Sahr to be present so that when Nelson is rude and lecherous to Sabine (having also deciding to own her too, not knowing that she's a princess), Sahr gets furious by Nelson's actions and immediately confiscates his Royal Warrant, warning all other trading companies not to mess with Mitsuha. The king also cuts ties with Nelson for attempting to gain custody of Sabine. Nelson is forced to retire in disgrace. The king is thrilled that Mitsuha manipulated events to let him prosecute the Adler Company, which is rife with corruption and rumors of human trafficking. They had also arrested members of the Adler Trading Company within the castle after learning of their motives, but they committed suicide to prevent interrogation. Mitsuha makes a fortune selling reading glasses to older men with bad vision and becomes good friends with Sabine, who is secretly introduced to television. A desperate woman visits Mitsuha for help.
9	"Tales from Paradise Restaurant"; Transliteration: "Rakuentei Kitan" (Japanese: 楽園亭奇譚)	Ryōji Tanaka	Ayumu Hisao	Hatsuki Tsuji	March 5, 2023
The woman, Aleena, works at a diner owned by her parents Bernd and Stella. The son of a rich man tried to seduce Aleena, but she refused as she is in love with her father's apprentice, Anel. Since then, their chef left to work for the rich man and Bernd was beaten by thugs. Sensing a conspiracy, Mitsuha agrees to help and trains Aleena and Anel in Yamano Cuisine which, due to its rarity among even nobility, can be sold for inflated prices. She hires Gritt and Ilze as waitresses, including Sabine, who volunteers for fun. The rich man, his son and Bernd's former chef attempt to have Bernd arrested for selling fake Yamano Cuisine, even asking Chef Marcel to confirm the food is fraudulent. However, Marcel confirms it is genuine since Mitsuha herself is present. By coincidence, Iris and Claus visit the diner to see Mitsuha, as does the King looking for Sabine. With their help, the rich man, his son, and the chef are exposed as the thugs who assaulted Bernd and are arrested. Mitsuha also does some matchmaking between Anel and Aleena. After expenses, Mitsuha's profit is a mere 1 gold, but she doesn't mind as she got more satisfaction from her good deeds. She later sends a letter to Collette. In the countryside, a monster horde appears.
10	"Then Let It Be War"; Transliteration: "Naraba Sensō da" (Japanese: ならば戦争だ)	Michita Shiraishi	Akihiko Inari	Masaharu Tomoda; Hiroshi Tamada	March 12, 2023
Mitsuha attends a party at Wolf Fang headquarters on Earth. After a few days without customers, Mitsuha begins offering discounts to adventurers who bring other adventurers to her shop. The King is disappointed that Sahr's investigation of Mitsuha has found nothing about her past, but is content that she is not a threat to the kingdom. Mitsuha is abruptly summoned by the King and asked to flee with Sabine to another country, as the neighboring Alder Empire is preparing to invade with 3,000 monsters and 20,000 soldiers, plus several nobles who have turned traitor against the king. When Mitsuha instead wishes to stay and fight, Sahr involves her in the council of war, where an assassin disguised as a knight attempts to kill Commander Marquis Aiblinger. Both Mitsuha (who was suspicious of the assassin before) and Alexis jump in the way. Although she is shot in the arm, Mitsuha survives and kills the assassin with her pistol, but Alexis is gravely injured. Angry and desperate, Mitsuha transports Alexis to Earth for lifesaving modern surgery and reveals her secret to Wolf Fang's Commander, hiring his entire army to fight in the other world. The Commander is skeptical of her story so Mitsuha transports him as proof along with one of his army trucks, just in time to save refugees fleeing from goblins that are somehow unharmed by bullets.
11	"The Messenger Goes into Battle"; Transliteration: "Himemiko no Shutsujin" (Japanese: 姫巫女の出陣)	Motohiko Niwa; Michita Shiraishi	Shin'ya Murakami	Motohiko Niwa	March 19, 2023
Mitsuha is able to scare the goblins away with fireworks, which also exposes the enemy monster tamer controlling them. Inspired by his first real fight in years, the Commander agrees the whole Wolf Fang Company will fight as paid mercenaries. As the army approaches the city, Wolf Fang, on Mitsuha's orders, take out the officers and monster tamers, terrifying the soldiers who are mostly forcibly conscripted peasants from the Empire, and setting the monsters free to cause havoc during the retreat. Even the Empire's flying wyvern squad is taken out by the vehicle Wolf Fang was named after, an armoured truck with two roof mounted 20mm auto-cannons. The kingdom hails Mitsuha by her unfortunate nickname, Messenger of Lightning. The enemy commander refuses to surrender yet and reveals the Empire's secret weapon: an immense dragon.
12	"Saving 80,000 Gold in Another World"; Transliteration: "Isekai de 8-Man-Mai no Kinka o Tamemasu" (Japanese: 異世界で8万枚の金貨を貯めます)	Hiroshi Tamada	Akihiko Inari	Takaaki Ishiyama	March 26, 2023
Using several drones with holographic projecting equipment and her world-shifting ability to confuse the dragon, Mitsuha directs Wolf Fang into attacking the beast. When the dragon becomes irritated enough to try and breathe fire, Mitshua shoots an RPG into its open maw, mortally wounding it. The dragon is forced to retreat, but then falls to the ground, seemly dead. The Empire's forces immediately turn tail, and Mitsuha allows the Wolf Fang Commander to keep one of the dragon's fangs before sending them back to Earth as Aiblinger's forces pursue the retreating forces. In the aftermath, Mitsuha is invited into the castle to be rewarded, where she coaxes a huge payment for the mercenaries from the assembled nobles and is made a citizen and viscountess of the realm. Returning to Earth, Mitsuha learns that Wolf Fang has sold the dragon fang to a researcher and have a made a fortune. She returns Alexis, who has recovered, to the kingdom, and with business having come to a standstill due to the war, Mitsuha closes the store and moves to her new fiefdom to resume her retirement plans from there, inviting Colette to serve as her retainer (Sabine wanted to go with her too, but the soldiers won't let her).

== Reception ==
Rebecca Silverman from Anime News Network praised the illustrations and latter half of the first novel, while criticizing the novel's story for making what Silverman felt were weird narrative choices.

== See also ==
- Didn't I Say to Make My Abilities Average in the Next Life?!, another light novel series by FUNA
- I Shall Survive Using Potions!, another light novel series by FUNA
- My Status as an Assassin Obviously Exceeds the Hero's, another light novel series illustrated by Tōzai
- The Eminence in Shadow, another light novel series illustrated by Tōzai
