= The Ride-On King =

Japanese manga series

- Cover of the first volume

ライドンキング (Raidon Kingu)
- Genre: Action, isekai
- Manga
- Written by: Yasushi Baba
- Published by: Kodansha
- English publisher: NA: Sol Press (former)
- Magazine: Monthly Shōnen Sirius
- Original run: May 26, 2018 – October 24, 2025
- Volumes: 16

The Ride-On King (Japanese: ライドンキング, Hepburn: Raidon Kingu) is a Japanese manga series written and illustrated by Yasushi Baba. It serves as a spin-off to Baba's previous series Golosseum. It was serialized in Kodansha's Monthly Shōnen Sirius magazine from May 2018 to October 2025. As of November 2025, the series' individual chapters have been collected into 16 volumes.

== Plot ==
The story is about judoka Alexander Purchinov, president for life of the country of Pursia. He rides a variety of exotic animals in the defense of his country.

== Publication ==
Written and illustrated by Yasushi Baba, the series began serialization in Kodansha's Monthly Shōnen Sirius magazine on May 26, 2018. The series ended serialization on October 24, 2025. As of November 2025, the series' individual chapters have been collected into 16 tankōbon volumes.

At Anime Expo 2019, Sol Press announced that they licensed the series for English publication. They released one volume before going defunct.

=== Volume list ===
No.	Original release date	Original ISBN	English release date	English ISBN
1	January 9, 2019	978-4-06-514210-3	July 6, 2019	978-1-94-883823-8
2	May 9, 2019	978-4-06-515493-9	—	—
3	October 9, 2019	978-4-06-517260-5	—	—
4	April 23, 2020	978-4-06-519224-5	—	—
5	December 9, 2020	978-4-06-521698-9	—	—
6	May 7, 2021	978-4-06-523248-4	—	—
7	October 7, 2021	978-4-06-525121-8	—	—
8	April 7, 2022	978-4-06-527578-8	—	—
9	October 7, 2022	978-4-06-529469-7	—	—
10	April 7, 2023	978-4-06-531326-8	—	—
11	October 6, 2023	978-4-06-533422-5	—	—
12	March 8, 2024	978-4-06-535278-6	—	—
13	August 7, 2024	978-4-06-536683-7	—	—
14	January 8, 2025	978-4-06-538021-5	—	—
15	June 9, 2025	978-4-06-539069-6	—	—
16	November 7, 2025	978-4-06-541372-2	—	—

== Reception ==
In the 2019 Next Manga Award, the series ranked ninth in the print manga category. In the 2020 edition of the Kono Manga ga Sugoi! guidebook, the series ranked twelfth on the list of the top manga targeted at a male audience. Employees of the Japanese bookstore Honya Club ranked the series as the tenth best manga of 2020.

The series has over 1.3 million copies in circulation.

Koiwai from Manga News praised the illustrations and story, especially for its use of the main character quirkiness. Faustine Lillaz from Planete BD liked the fight scenes and humor, though she worried that the series would have little overarching plot. The columnist for Manga Sanctuary liked the characters and their designs, the action sequences, and the setting, calling it unique among fantasy works.
