= Simoun (TV series) =

Japanese anime television series

シムーン (Shimūn)
- Genre: Science fiction, yuri
- Created by: Shō Aikawa; Yoshizaki Sasa; Gō Mihara
- Anime television series
- Directed by: Junji Nishimura
- Produced by: Junka Kobayashi; Keiichi Matsuda; Takashi Takefuji
- Music by: Toshihiko Sahashi
- Studio: Studio Deen
- Licensed by: US: AnimeWorks
- Original network: TV Tokyo
- Original run: 3 April 2006 – 25 September 2006
- Episodes: 26
- Manga
- Written by: Hayase Hashiba
- Published by: Ichijinsha
- Magazine: Comic Yuri Hime
- Original run: January 2006 – July 2006
- Volumes: 1
- Manga

Simoun Magical Biyūden
- Written by: Wataru Akiduki
- Published by: Gakken
- Magazine: Megami Magazine
- Original run: August 2006 – December 2006
- Light novel
- Written by: Junko Okazaki
- Illustrated by: Asako Nishida
- Published by: Gakken
- Imprint: Megami Bunko
- Original run: August 2006 – December 2006
- Volumes: 2

Simoun (Japanese: シムーン, Hepburn: Shimūn) is a Japanese anime television series created by Shō Aikawa, Yoshizaki Sasa and Gō Mihara. It ran for 26 episodes on TV Tokyo from April 3 to September 25, 2006.

A manga adaptation was published in three issues of Comic Yuri Hime. The manga shared the same characters and setting as the anime, but presented a different storyline. A second manga was serialized in Megami Magazine, with a radically different setting and a comic rather than serious and dramatic tone. There is also a two-volume light novel adaptation, which unlike the manga has a storyline close to that of the anime.

In May 2007, Simoun was licensed for release in North America by Media Blasters.

== Plot ==
=== Setting and themes ===
Simoun takes place on the earth-like planet Daikūriku (大空陸; "great sky land" or "heaven's shore"). The people of Daikūriku are all born female. The theocratic nation of Simulacrum has a monopoly on the helical motor technology and as a result grew to prosperity. The two nations Argentum and Plumbum wage war against it in an attempt to steal the technology. In Simulacrum, the girls grow up until age of seventeen, when they make a pilgrimage to a holy place known as "the Spring" to select their permanent sex. Simulacrum is defended by advanced airships known as "Simoun", two-seater aircraft propelled by two helical motors. Simoun are piloted by priestesses known as sibyllae (シムーン·シヴュラ, Shimūn Shivyura; plural; singular sibylla), each a girl who has not yet chosen a permanent sex; doing so renders one physically incapable of piloting a Simoun. sibyllae are organized into "choirs" or "chor" of twelve that pilot six Simoun when at full strength. The sibyllae can inscribe enormous glyphs known as Ri Mājon in the sky using the Simoun to produce powerful magical effects both for combat and ceremony.

=== Story ===
A war breaks out between three nations Simulacrum, Argentum, and Plumbum over Simulacrum helical motor technology that powers the airships known as Simouns. Two fleets of the Simoun, Chor Caput and Chor Tempest, stumble upon a huge Argentum airship fleet attempting steal a Simoun. Suffering massive losses in the battle, the pair Neviril and Amuria of Chor Tempest attempt an extremely powerful but extremely dangerous maneuver out of desperation named the Emerald Ri Mājon (翠玉のリ·マージョン, Suigyoku no Ri Mājon); Neviril hesitates after making eye contact with the enemy, and the pair fail resulting in an explosion that takes Amuria with it. The fight leaves the sibyllae or members of Chor Tempest extremely demoralized and Neviril in despair.

Four new sibyllae join Chor Tempest, one of them an excellent pilot with an unshakeable morale named Aer. Aer immediately decides to partner with Neviril, however despite her persistent attempts, Neviril remains too mired in her grief over Amuria's death to accept her. After continued battles with Chor Tempest, the Plumbish government eventually sues for peace. Neviril's father orders two sibyllae to join Chor Tempest bringing it back to full strength and assigns one to be Neviril's partner in attempt to jar his daughter out of her depression; however Neviril, becoming more accepting of Aer, rejects her. A Plumbish suicide bomber sabotages the peace talks jarring Neviril out of her funk and she agrees to pair with Aer.

Chor Tempest begins to operate aggressively against the enemy nations. In an ensuing battle, the enemy manage to separate Chor Tempest, forcing two of its sibyllae, Limone and Dominūra, to perform the Emerald Ri Mājon in desperation. They succeed, but disappear without a trace. Chor Tempest retreats to secure Simulacrum's holiest site, the Ruins. There, Aer and Neviril learn that Emerald Ri Mājon allows the sibyllae piloting the Simoun to travel through time. Limone and Dominūra are shown to have landed in the distant past where they pass on the knowledge of the Emerald Ri Mājon. Chor Tempest continue to fight as they slowly retreat back, and eventually Simulacrum sues for peace. The allied Plumbish and Argentum forces demand in their terms that all sibyllae become adults by visiting the holy Spring, thereby no longer being able to pilot Simoun. While the members Chor Tempest head off to the Spring, Aer and Neviril stay back and soon confess their feelings for each other. The allied occupation arrest them, however with the help of their former choirmates and the Plumbish priestesses, Aer and Neviril break free and say their farewells. Performing the Emerald Ri Mājon, the two vanish in a flash of light.

== Media ==
=== Anime ===
The anime has been released on DVD in Japan by Bandai Visual. The series consists of nine DVDs, with two episodes on the first volume and three on each of the others. They are encoded for Region 2 and do not have English subtitles. A 7-disc DVD box set was released in Japan on 28 January 2011. The box set includes all 26 episodes but none of the on-disc extras or liner notes from the original DVDs. Megami Magazine released a 30-minute promotional DVD for Simoun in September 2006. The offer was limited to the first 1000 readers to mail in a coupon from the magazine. The DVD includes cast commentary and interviews, a Tsukkomi segment similar to that on DVD volume 8, a "voice-over" for the first installment of the Megami manga, and other promotional material.

Media Blasters announced the Region 1 license for Simoun in May 2007. Their releases are subtitled only (no English dub). The series was released in five volumes.

=== Audio CDs ===
Victor Entertainment released two maxi singles that served as theme music for Simoun anime series. The opening theme, "That Which is Beautiful is Good" (美しければそれでいい, Utsukushi Kereba Sore de Ii), performed by Chiaki Ishikawa, was released on April 4, 2006. The ending theme, "Song of Prayer" (祈りの詩, Inori no Uta), performed by Savage Genius, was released on April 19, 2006. Two original soundtracks were released across two albums titled Simoun Original Soundtrack 1 and Simoun Original Soundtrack 2, released by Victor Entertainment on June 21, 2006, and August 30, 2006. All 52 tracks except the opening and ending theme were composed by Toshihiko Sahashi.

The album Crystals of Wind (風の結晶, Kaze no Kesshō), performed by Savage Genius, was released by Victor Entertainment on July 5, 2006. It contained the opening theme, "My All ~Die for You~" (あたしのすべて 〜Die for You〜, Atashi no Subete), and the ending theme, The Consequences of a Dream (夢のあとさき, Yume no Atosaki), for the PS2 adaptation.

One drama CD titled Aa Uruwashi no Haken OL, Nazenanda Simoun Kabushiki Gaisha (嗚呼麗しの派遣OL、実録シムーン株式会社) was released on October 25, 2006. It is a comedy set in an alternative universe in which several of the characters wind up in modern-day Tokyo and attempt to start their own company.

=== Internet radio compilations ===
Internet Radio Station Onsen featured a weekly internet radio show Radio Wave DE Ri Maajon (電波 DE リ·マージョン, Dempa DE Ri Maajon) hosted by voice actors Rieko Takahashi and Mikako Takahashi that ran from July 21, 2006, to January 15, 2007, for twenty-six episodes. The radio series was compiled into two CD-ROMs titled Simoun 〜電波 DE リ·マージョン〜 Flight 1 and Simoun 〜電波 DE リ·マージョン〜 Flight 2 containing 13 episodes each released by Onsen on November 24, 2006, and February 23, 2007. Both came with a bonus audio CD of previously unreleased material of similar content to the radio episodes. There was a special one-off radio show on June 6, 2007, that which was a tie-in with the release of the PS2 game. It was later released as a CD titled Simoun 〜電波 DE リ·マージョン〜 Special Flight on August 17, 2007.

=== Manga ===
A retelling story titled Simoun written by Hashiba Hayase was serialized in Comic Yuri Hime volumes 3–5 (January, April and July 2006). Serialization has ceased, and the manga has been republished as a single tankōbon of 150 pages and was published on September 16, 2006, bearing an ISBN 4-7580-7010-5. The tankōbon included a new eight-page side story titled Intermission. A comedic retelling titled Simoun Magical Biyūden (シムーンまじかる美勇伝, Shimūn Majikaru Biyūden) was serialized in Megami Magazine. It appeared in five monthly installments from volume 75 (August 2006) to volume 79 (December 2006). This version is basically a spoof that bears minimal resemblance to the anime, whereas the Comic Yuri Hime version was similar to the anime in tone (if not in content).

=== Light novels ===
A two-volume series of light novels has been published by Megami Library (メガミ文庫, Megami Bunko). They are written by Junko Okazaki (岡崎純子) and feature illustrations by Asako Nishida (西田亜沙子). The storyline is similar to that of the anime, although not identical. The first volume was 176 pages in length, including full-page color illustrations, published on August 4, 2006, bearing an ISBN 978-4-05-903511-4. The second volume was 202 pages, also including eight full-page color illustrations, and was published on December 4, 2006, bearing an ISBN 978-4-05-903512-1.

=== Games ===
A PlayStation 2 adventure/simulation game titled Simoun: Rose War ~Ri Mājon of Sealing~ (シムーン 異薔薇戦争〜封印のリ·マージョン〜, Shimūn Ibara Sensō 〜Fūin no Ri Mājon〜) has been released by Marvelous Entertainment. The game comes in both limited and standard editions. It was initially scheduled for release in November 2006, but was delayed to 21 June 2007.

=== Merchandise and artbooks ===
Asako Nishida's 144-page artbook, Jam: Asako Nishida Art Works (西田亜沙子画集–ジャム–), includes approximately 22 pages of Simoun-related art, including DVD cover and eyecatch illustrations, artwork published in Megami and other promotional material, and character illustrations from Nishida's personal website. It was published on July 2, 2009, bearing the ISBN 978-4-7767-9452-3.

Although no official figures have been released, a garage kit of Neviril and Aer was created under license by Maruya Studio (まるや工房, Maruya Kōbō). The kit was sold in limited quantities at Wonder Festival on 20 August 2006. The same studio also produced kits of Morinas and Limone, which were sold at Wonder Festival on 25 February 2007. A garage kit of 1/48 scale Simulacrum's Simoun was created under license by The Ri Mājon of Solidification (立体化のリ·マージョン, Rittaika no Ri Mājon). He manufactured Aer's Simile Simoun 1/48 Odonata was created under license by / The Ri Mājon of Solidification another window (立体化のリ·マージョン別窓, Rittaika no Ri Mājon betsu-mado).

== Reception ==
Erica Friedman, the president of Yuricon and ALC Publishing, named Simoun "Best Yuri of 2006", speaking highly of its soundtrack, artwork, and story. On the negative side, she reprimanded the character designs, especially Neviril's, comparing her to "a sex toy blow up doll". Similarly, Mark Thomas of Anime on DVD called Neviril's design "unreal", lacking the "natural feel" of other characters but has justified it with the "goddess-like" role she plays in the series. Anime News Network has also noted Neviril's "true charisma" after she comes out of her "crippling funk" by episode eight.

Friedman praised the Media Blasters release for having a mostly very good translation, for leaving in the honorifics (although no explanation was given for the honorifics on the disc). Friedman criticized the Media Blasters release for having strange romanizations of proper nouns, which were insisted upon by the Japanese owners and for having no insert pictures.

Anime News Network praised the story for not having to rely on its yuri content and for being a creative mecha series that provides food for thought. Its tone is different from other teen pilot series, as it is "never grim". The characters are also noted as being more than "one-note cookie cutter portrayals". The use of penciled still shots remaining on the screen for some time was criticized. The series' resolution was perceived as partially satisfactory, as some elements were "bitter". Martin also said that the Simoun "unabashedly advertises itself as a yuri series," and delivers on that, especially "girl-girl kissing," since kissing between pairs activates the Simoun, with the series not only relying on that, but religious overtones to operating the Simoun, with a mix of "exceptionally pretty and extraordinarily plain" art. He further praised the musical score of the series and said that the series has enough other merits without "requiring its yuri content as a draw."
