= Yotsunoha =

Japanese visual novel by Haikuo Soft

- Logo of the visual novel Yotsunoha

よつのは
- Genre: Drama, Romance
- Video game
- Developer: Haikuo Soft
- Publisher: JP: Haikuo Soft (Windows) Gadget Soft (PS2); WW: Sol Press (Windows)
- Genre: Eroge, Visual novel
- Platform: Windows, PlayStation 2
- Released: Windows: JP: January 27, 2006; WW: July 27, 2018; PlayStation 2: JP: August 28, 2008
- Manga
- Written by: Haikuo Soft
- Illustrated by: Bow Ditama
- Published by: Gakken
- Magazine: Megami Magazine
- Original run: January 30, 2008 – July 30, 2008
- Volumes: 1
- Original video animation
- Directed by: Hiroshi Nishikiori
- Produced by: Kozue Kaneniwa; Mitsutoshi Ogura; Ken Hashiya; Shigeru Asai
- Written by: Hiroshi Nishikori
- Music by: I've Sound
- Studio: Hal Film Maker
- Released: February 29, 2008 – March 28, 2008
- Runtime: 37 minutes
- Episodes: 2

Yotsunoha (よつのは; lit. 'Four-leaf Clover') is a Japanese visual novel developed by Haikuo Soft, and was originally released in Japan as an erotic game on January 27, 2006, for Microsoft Windows. A PlayStation 2 version titled Yotsunoha: A Journey of Sincerity, published by Gadget Soft with adult content removed, was released in 2008, and an English version for Windows was released by Sol Press in 2018. The story in Yotsunoha focuses on the appeal of the four female main characters. The gameplay follows a linear plot line, which offers pre-determined scenarios and courses of interaction.

Yotsunoha has since then spawned two spin-off titles, Osananajimi to no Kurashi Kata and Nono to Kuraso, and has made several transitions to other media. A manga adaptation illustrated by Japanese artist Bow Ditama was first serialized in the Megami Magazine on January 30, 2008. It was followed by an original video animation series animated by Hal Film Maker. This was released on two single-episode DVDs on February 29, 2008, and March 28, 2008. There were also two Drama CDs, and two Internet radio shows hosted by Yui Sakakibara in order to promote the game.

== Gameplay ==
An average conversation in Yotsunoha depicting the main character talking to Iori.

Gameplay in Yotsunoha requires relatively little player interaction as most of the duration of the game is spent on only reading the text that appear on the screen, representing the dialogue between the numerous characters in the game. Similar to role-playing video games, the player is allowed to navigate through the school in a top-down perspective, and is allowed to enter different areas such as classrooms.

At times, the player will come to a point, where he or she is given the chance to choose to navigate through the school with different female characters. During so, gameplay pauses until the player makes a choice. Depending on the choices the player makes, different events might occur as the player enter different areas, effectively progressing the plot in a specific direction. There are four main plot lines that the player will have the chance to experience. To view all of the plot lines, the player will need to replay the game multiple times, picking different girls and access different areas to progress the plot in an alternate direction. One of the player's objective in the original version of the game is to view the hentai scenes depicting the main character Makoto having sexual intercourse with one of the heroines.

== Plot ==
=== Setting and themes ===
The main part of Yotsunoha's story takes place in an abandoned school named Mochizuki Academy (望月学園, Mochizuki Gakuen) and its surrounding area. The school is a four-story building, housing facilities such as classrooms, the art room, the home economics room, and the light music club's room. There is also a small field outside of the school building, housing the small garden where the characters buried their time capsule prior to their separation.

Childhood friendship plays an important role in the story. Throughout the story, characters are constantly reminded of their childhood memories by different locations in the school. This is further expressed by the characters' emotions before and after their separation, and the time capsule they have buried.

=== Principal characters ===
Makoto Yūki (結城 誠, Yūki Makoto)
Voiced by: Hideki Tasaka (OVA)
Makoto is the male protagonist of Yotsunoha. Despite being friendly, and always thinking for his friends before himself, he has trouble of expressing his feelings to others. Makoto choose Nono over everyone else before she left.

Nono Nekomiya (猫宮 のの, Nekomiya Nono)
Voiced by: Yui Sakakibara
Nono is the main heroine of Yotsunoha. Despite being one year younger than Makoto, she is really helpful, taking tasks such as cooking and homemaking for Makoto and Iori, who lived next door to her prior to their separation. She moved to the Kansai region after the school's closure.

Iori Yuzuki (柚姫 衣織, Yuzuki Iori)
Voiced by: Junko Kusayanagi (game), Yūko Gotō (OVA)
Iori is one of Makoto's childhood friends, and is the oldest of the group. Prior to their separation, she lived in Makoto's house, and despite being older than him, when at home would always refer him as her elder brother. She has an affection towards sweets and snacks, to such an extreme that she brought only tidbits despite her plans of staying at the school overnight.

Matsuri Amachi (天地 祭, Amachi Matsuri)
Voiced by: Shizuku Ibuki (game), Mai Gotō (OVA, PS2 game)
Matsuri is another childhood friend of Makoto's. She has the highest academic scores among the group of friends, and stayed at a local school after their school's closedown. Matsuri is considerably more inarticulate and anti-social after the reunion, as a result of taking Makoto's comments before their separation too seriously.

Arisa Yuki (雪 亜凜沙, Yuki Arisa)
Voiced by: Miru (game), Sayuri Yahagi (OVA, PS2 game)
Arisa is a weak and quiet girl who has transferred into Makoto's class shortly before its closure.

=== Story ===
The story of Yotsunoha revolves around a group of friends, reunited after being separated for three years as a result of the closure of Mochizuki Academy, the school they have attended in together. Upon arrival, Makoto Yūki, the protagonist discovers that the time capsule the group of friends buried prior to their separation has been dug up. In its place is a note left by his former teacher Yamamoto, informing him that he has dug up their capsule and hidden it elsewhere in the school. After being reunited, Makoto and his group of friends decide to stay overnight, looking for clues left behind by their teacher, and find the time capsule.

== Development ==
Yotsunoha is the second commercial project of the then dōjin soft developer Haikuo Soft, following their previous work on Sukumizu Police. Tatomu and Keikei, two writers who have previously worked on _Summer, planned the scenario used in Yotsunoha, while work on the computer graphics, in addition to character designs, were split between four members, Hīde, Xsara, Koshino and Akira Kasukabe. The music used in the game was composed solely by Ryō Kyōna.

Several improvements have been made to the PS2 version of the game. Gadget Soft hired Suno, a scenario planner to provide additional scenario after the adult content in the game is removed. Hal Film Maker, the studio that has previously adapted Yotsunoha into OVA, was also hired for the computer graphics used in the game.

=== Release history ===
Yotsunoha was first available to the public as a free game demo, released online on September 24, 2005, which gives the player a glimpse into the story and gameplay of Yotsunoha. The game was later released as a limited edition containing a set of three CD-ROMs for Microsoft Windows on January 10, 2006. It was later followed by a regular edition, released on September 1, 2006, as one DVD. This version of the game contained new computer graphic scenes and additional voice acting for side characters, which was later available to the limited edition through a patch. A PlayStation 2 version titled Yotsunoha: A Journey of Sincerity with adult content removed published by Gadget Soft was originally released on August 28, 2008, as both a limited edition and a regular edition, after it was delayed from its original July 24, 2008, release date. Sol Press released an English version of Yotsunoha on July 27, 2018.

== Adaptations ==
Cover art of the volume 1 of the OVA adaptation of Yotsunoha.

=== Drama CDs ===
There have been two sets of Drama CDs based on Yotsunoha. The first Drama CD release was titled A Snowman 140 cm Tall (140センチの雪だるま, 140 Senchi no Yukidaruma). It was first available to the public at Comiket 71, and was later released in stores on January 26, 2007, as a set of two CDs, and featured the voice actors who have previously provided voice acting for the game, in addition to Kazutaka Ishii who provided voice acting for the character Makoto Yūki. It was later followed by a second Drama CD release, released on April 23, 2008, featuring the voice cast of the OVA adaptation.

=== Manga ===
Yotsunoha was also adapted into a manga series, illustrated by Japanese artist Bow Ditama, known for his previous work on Mahoromatic. The manga series was serialized in the manga magazine Megami Magazine between March and December 2008 issues, and a single bound volume was published on September 29, 2008, by Gakken.

=== OVA ===
Yotsunoha was first announced to be adapted into a two-episode OVA series on July 3, 2007, at the Rondo Robe convention hosted in Tokyo. A preview to the series was then streamed online on February 22, 2008, followed by the first volume's release on February 29, 2008, one week later. The second volume was then released on March 28, 2008. Both volumes contain the episode itself and a book containing illustrations by Hīde.

== Music ==
Yotsunoha's soundtrack was composed solely by Ryō Kyōna, who has previously also worked on Suku Mizu Porisu, the first commercial project of Haikuo Soft. Aside from the in-game soundtrack, he has also composed the two theme songs used in the game, "Yotsunoha", the opening theme sung by Chata, and "Shining Orange", the ending theme sung by Yui Sakakibara. The lyrics of both of the songs were written by Keikei, one of the scenario planners. An original soundtrack disc, containing the music used in the game and the opening and ending themes, were included as an extra in the limited edition release of the game.

The OVA adaptation of Yotsunoha featured a new set of soundtrack, written by artists from I've Sound. In addition to the new score, two new pieces were used as the theme song. "Memories in Love" (恋する記憶, Koisuru Kioku), sung by Yui Sakakibara, and "Wish" (ねがい, Negai), sung by Chata, who has also written the lyrics for the song herself, were used as the opening and ending theme respectively. A maxi single containing both of these songs was released on February 29, 2008, while the soundtrack used in the OVA was released on March 28, 2008.

New theme songs were also used for the PlayStation 2 version of the game. The opening theme "Soon" was sung by Yui Sakakibara, with composition by Yūki Mizukami, and lyrics by Himiko. While the ending theme "Love Rice" (ラブ☆ライス, Rabu Raisu) was sung by Chata, with composition by Pējun and lyrics written by Yuka Matsumoto. A maxi single containing the two songs was released on July 23, 2008.

== Reception and sales ==
Based on the sales on solely Getchu.com, Yotsunoha was placed at fourth place out of twenty when it was first released in January 2006, and while it did not make any further appearances on the monthly charts, it was placed at thirty-six out of fifty, out of all sales recorded during the first half of the year on the same website. According to a national ranking of bishōjo games based on sales in Japan, the limited edition of Yotsunoha was ranked eighth out of fifty when it was first listed. It was then dropped to the twenty-ninth in the next issue, making its final appearance on the chart.
