= Hideki Tasaka =

Japanese voice actor (born 1975)

- Born: March 15, 1975 (age 51); Shizuoka Prefecture, Japan
- Occupation: Voice actor
- Agent: Sigma Seven
- Notable credit(s): Final Fantasy XII as Reks; Vandread as Duelo McFile
- Height: 176 cm (5 ft 9 in)

Hideki Tasaka (田坂 秀樹, Tasaka Hideki; born March 15, 1975) is a Japanese voice actor who currently works for Sigma Seven. He is best known as the voice of Reks in the original Japanese version of Final Fantasy XII and Duelo McFile in Vandread.

== Notable voice roles ==
=== Anime television ===
- Blood+ - Gestas
- Diamond Daydreams - Tezuk
- Gravion
- RahXephon - Masaru Gomi
- Sgt. Frog - Megaton
- SoltyRei - Larry Anderson
- Stratos 4 - Tsubasa Miyazawa
- Vandread series - Duelo McFile
- Skull Man - Tetsurou Shingyouji
- Persona -trinity soul- - Takurō Sakakiba

=== OVA ===
- Yotsunoha - Makoto Yūki
- Hanayaka Nari, Waga Ichizoku: Kinetograph - Isami Miyanomori

=== Video game ===
- beatmania IIDX 27 HEROIC VERSE - Siren
- Final Fantasy XII - Reks
- True Tears - Keigo Sakuragawa

=== Tokusatsu ===
- Kamen Rider × Kamen Rider Wizard & Fourze: Movie War Ultimatum – Other Kamen Riders (Voice of Atsushi Tamaru and Junji Majima)

=== Drama CDs ===
- Aisaresugite Kodoku series 2: Itoshisugita Shifuku - Waiter
- Happy Time - Nanao Kojima
