= Let This Grieving Soul Retire! =

Japanese light novel series and its adaptations

- Let This Grieving Soul Retire! Woe Is the Weakling Who Leads the Strongest Party
- First light novel volume cover

嘆きの亡霊は引退したい ～最弱ハンターによる最強パーティ育成術 (Nageki no Bōrei wa Intai Shitai: Saijaku Hunter ni Yoru Saikyō Party Ikusei-jutsu)
- Genre: Fantasy comedy
- Novel series
- Written by: Tsukikage
- Published by: Shōsetsuka ni Narō
- Original run: January 27, 2018 – present
- Light novel
- Written by: Tsukikage
- Illustrated by: Chyko
- Published by: Micro Magazine
- English publisher: NA: Sol Press (former) J-Novel Club (current)
- Imprint: GC Novels
- Original run: August 30, 2018 – present
- Volumes: 14
- Manga
- Written by: Tsukikage
- Illustrated by: Rai Hebino
- Published by: ASCII Media Works
- English publisher: NA: Yen Press
- Imprint: Dengeki Comics NEXT
- Magazine: ComicWalker (Note: ComicWalker changed its name to KadoComi (カドコミ) in December 2023.)
- Original run: April 27, 2019 – present
- Volumes: 13
- Anime television series
- Directed by: Masahiro Takata
- Written by: Hideki Shirane
- Music by: Ryōhei Sataka
- Studio: Zero-G
- Licensed by: Crunchyroll (streaming); SA/SEA: Muse Communication
- Original network: Tokyo MX, BS NTV, SUN, MBS, AT-X
- Original run: October 1, 2024 – December 15, 2025
- Episodes: 24
- icon

Let This Grieving Soul Retire! Woe Is the Weakling Who Leads the Strongest Party (嘆きの亡霊は引退したい ～最弱ハンターによる最強パーティ育成術, Nageki no Bōrei wa Intai Shitai: Saijaku Hunter ni Yoru Saikyō Party Ikusei-jutsu) is a Japanese light novel series written by Tsukikage and illustrated by Chyko. It began serialization as a web novel published on the user-generated novel publishing website Shōsetsuka ni Narō in January 2018. It was later acquired by Micro Magazine who began publishing it under their GC Novels light novel imprint in August 2018. A manga adaptation illustrated by Rai Hebino began serialization on Kadokawa's ComicWalker manga website in April 2019. An anime television series adaptation produced by Zero-G aired in split-cours, with the first part aired from October to December 2024, and the second part aired from October to December 2025.

== Characters ==
Krai Andriy (クライ・アンドリヒ, Kurai Andorihi)
Voiced by: Kensho Ono (Japanese); Aaron Dismuke (English)
He is the male protagonist, age 20, and a Level 8 treasure hunter with a second moniker of "Thousand Tricks". His profession is still 'unknown'. He is the leader of the Grieving Souls party and the Clan Master (CM) and founder of the First Steps clan. He is famously known for his 'absolute defense' that is immune to all attacks, and he has a Godlike foresight. Plus, he is notoriously known as a man who can finish a difficult mission with a 100% completion rate.
According to series creator Tsukikage, Krai is weak for real. He is recorded with 3–7 points in all the stats by Evolved Greed, and his rank is listed as '4' points in the Code scan.
Despite this, he is a treasure hunter who has an immunity against fear of death (because he got used to it) after the young Grievers survived their first encounter in the Lost Inn. He is immune in mana sickness, unlike his party members, because of his low aptitude. Plus, he is a maniac who loves to collect Relics whether they are defective or not. Some of his defective Relics are quite useful in high risk situations. Moreover, he is the treasure hunter who is famously known to have resolved the issue in the "Cursed Incident", clear two Level 10 Treasure Vaults (Lost Inn & Source Temple) by defeating the Phantom Gods (Mother Fox and Keller), beaten the Fox God for the second time to save the Emperor Radrick and his people, resolved the forestation of the Toizant, ignited a civil war in the Fox organization after the Supreme Martial Arts Tournament, explored the Yggdra (World Tree) and resolved the issue of the impending destruction of the world, and in the Level 9 Certification Exam, he single-handedly destroyed his third difficult and high leveled treasure vault: an invincible flying-class fortress and monarch nation called "Code Fortress". The Code is considered the arch-enemy of the Explorers Association after they suffered two consecutive defeats a hundred years ago. Afterward, the Zebrudia Empire and the Explorers Association put him on discretionary suspension until the aftermath is resolved completely: they halt his hunting activities until further notice. This news makes him rejoice because this is what he is wishing to happen: retiring from the treasure hunting and do nothing. He also attempts to avoid several romantic advances from the girls in the cast—particularly Liz, Tino, and Sitri—as he does not want to be in a relationship with anyone.
Tino Shade (ティノ・シェイド, Tino Sheido)
Voiced by: Miyu Kubota (Japanese); Tia Ballard (English)
A Level 4 treasure hunter who has a crush on Krai; age 16. Her profession is 'Thief'. She is Liz's apprentice, but is beyond terrified of her. She prays three times a day in front of the clan house, and addresses Krai Andrey as 'Master is God'.
Liz Smart (リィズ・スマート, Ryizu Sumāto)
Voiced by: Fairouz Ai (Japanese); Trina Nishimura (English)
Her second moniker is 'Stifled Shadow'; age 20. Level 6 Treasure Hunter. One of Krai's childhood friends and a member of the Grieving Souls, of which she is the 'Thief'. Though she is friendly and compassionate to her friends, and appears to be in love with Krai (much to his constant annoyance, as he does not reciprocate whatsoever), she is actually a beast and looks down on the others who doesn't exert their best in their treasure hunting. She loves to train Tino both emotionally and psychologically, leaving the girl permanently traumatized.
She is infamously known as a troublemaker in the group, along with Luke Sykol.
Sitri Smart (シトリー・スマート, Shitorī Sumāto)
Voiced by: Konomi Kohara (Japanese); Kate Bristol (English)
Liz's younger sister. Her second moniker is 'Deep Black', age 19. Her profession is 'Alchemist'. Level 2 Treasure Hunter. She is famously considered to be the strong weakling and the strongest command tower of the Grieving Souls, second to Krai Andrey. Like Liz and Tino, she appears to be in love with Krai, and she prepares a lot of secret hideouts to elope to with him, constantly annoying him beyond belief.
Luke Sykol (ルーク・サイコル, Rūku Saikoru)
Voiced by: Kōhei Amasaki (Japanese); Ethan Condon (English)
His second moniker is 'Thousand Swords', age 20. Level 6 Treasure Hunter. The 'Swordsman' of the Grieving Souls. He uses a wooden sword as his primary weapon, and is known as a troublemaker in the group, along with Liz Smart.
Ansem Smart (アンセム・スマート, Ansemu Sumāto)
Voiced by: Tomokazu Sugita, Chihaya Mori (young) (Japanese); Cris George (English)
His second moniker is 'The Immutable'; age 21. Level 7 Treasure Hunter. His role is 'Paladin' of the Grieving Souls. He is the elder brother of Liz and Sitri Smart, and is the strongest healer of the Imperial Capital. Plus, he is considered as the conscience of the party due to his good reputation. Without him, the Grieving Souls would be considered as a 'red party' (criminals).
Lucia Rogier (ルシア・ロジェ, Rushia Roje)
Voiced by: Aoi Koga (Japanese); Megan Shipman (English)
Her second moniker is 'Avatar of Creation'; age 19. Level 6 Treasure Hunter. The 'Magus' of the Grieving Souls. She is the famous Magus of the Imperial Capital and her school. She is the reason why Starlight party joins the First Steps. She is the 'step' sister of Krai Andrey, the non-blood-related younger sister who created a lot of unique magic based on Krai's childhood book that he had written for fun.
According to Tsukikage, she will replace her stepbrother, Krai Andrey, as the series' protagonist in Volume 13.
Eva Renfield (エヴァ・レンフィード, Eba Renfīdo)
Voiced by: Yō Taichi (Japanese); Molly Searcy (English)
She is the Vice Clan Master (VCM) of the First Steps. She is famously known as the 'right hand' of Krai Andrey.
Rhuda Runebeck (ルーダ・ルンベック, Ruda Runbekku)
Voiced by: Akira Sekine (Japanese); Stephanie Stark (English)
Level 3 Thief. She got promoted to level 4 after the White Wolf Den rescue mission.
Greg Zangief (グレッグ・ザンギフ, Gureggu Zangifu)
Voiced by: Kouji Seki (Japanese); Tyson Rinehart (English)
Level 4 treasure hunter. He retires after the Auction incident, and he is currently working as a 'Rookie merchant'.
Gilbert Bush (ギルベルト・ブッシュ, Giruberuto Busshu)
Voiced by: Seiji Maeda (Japanese); Derick Snow (English)
Level 4 treasure hunter. Former member of the Slapped party led by Tino Shade. He is currently working as the 'Swordman' of the Scorching Whirlwind party.
Ark Rodin (アーク・ロダン, Āku Rodan)
Voiced by: Jun Fukuyama (Japanese); Branden Loera (English)
He is a level 7 Treasure Hunter, age 22. His moniker is 'Argent Thunderclap'. He is the leader of the Arc Brave. He is a descendant of the Hero Rodin. He considers Krai Andrey as friend despite he commented before that his existence is an enigma to him.
Gark Welter (ガーク・ヴェルター, Gāku Vuerutā)
Voiced by: Akio Otsuka (Japanese); Ray Hurd (English)
The Branch Manager of Imperial Capital Explorers Association. He is a former level 7 Treasure Hunter with a moniker, 'War Demon'. Uncle of Chloe Welter.
Kaina Noss (カイナ・ノス, Kaina Nosu)
Voiced by: Haruka Michii (Japanese); Erin Kelly Noble (English)
The Vice Branch Manager of Imperial Capital Explorers Association. She is the female character who registered the Grieving Souls in the Explorers Association.
Chloe Welter (クロエ・ヴェルター, Kuroe Vuerutā)
Voiced by: Satomi Amano (Japanese); Elisa Danielle James (English)
She is the famous and cutesy receptionist of the Explorers Association Imperial Capital Branch, as well as the niece of Gark Welter. After her defeat in the combat test by Luke Sykol, she resigns as a treasure hunter. She idolizes Krai Andrey, so she decides to become a receptionist.
Lapis Fulgor (ラピス・フルゴル, Rapisu Furugoru)
Voiced by: Haruka Shiraishi
Kris Argent (クリュス・アルゲン, Kuryusu Arugen)
Voiced by: Yū Serizawa
Éclair Gladys (エクレール・グラディス, Ekurēru Guradisu)
Voiced by: Hana Hishikawa
Artbaran Henning (アルトバラン・ヘニング, Arutobaran Heningu)
Voiced by: Kiyono Yasuno
Mary Auden (マリー・オーデン, Marī Ōden)
Voiced by: Yuki Wakai
Ryuulan (リューラン, Ryūran)
Voiced by: Himika Akaneya
Kechachakka Munk (ケチャチャッカ・ムンク, Kechachakka Munku)
Voiced by: Hidenari Ugaki

== Intel ==
First Steps
It is considered as the newest and strongest clan of the continent. Due to the countless 'thousand trials' it has faced so far, the number of the official members declined and left the clan, leaving behind the elites who succeeded to survive the draconian program bestowed by Krai Andrey. It is founded by Krai Andrey (Grieving Souls), Ark Rodin (Arc Brave), Sven Anger (Obsidian Cross), Lapis Fulgor (Starlight), and Touka (Knight of the Torch).
The clan is composed of the elite parties and rivals of the Grieving Souls.
Grieving Souls (a.k.a "Strange Grief")
Founded by Krai Andrey and his five childhood friends. Registered by Kaina Noss in Explorers Association. It is also known as 'Grievers'. They are considered as the topnotch, elite class and the strongest party with all members with titular monikers in their profiles.
Arc Brave
Led by Ark Rodin. They are considered as the second strongest party in the First Steps.
Obsidian Cross
Led by Sven Anger. They are considered as the third strongest in the First Steps.
Starlight
Led by Lapis Fulgor. They are composed of Noble Spirits who resided in the human continent to live with them. Kriz Argent is famously known as a Noble Spirit member. They are recruited by Krai Andrey despite the negative opinions of Ark Rodin and Sven Anger because they are considered as the troublemakers. Krai Andrey wants to use them as a cover to cover up the atrocities of his two childhood friends Liz Smart and Luke Sykol, stating that 'hiding a tree inside the forest'.
Knight of the Torch
The number of members are 20, led by Touka. They are considered a mercenary party.
Explorers Associations (Association, in short)
It is the overseer of the treasure hunting world, ranking hunters by levels that are widely regarded as an indication of hunter's prowess. As a result, the hunters commonly included their level in introduction.

== Terms ==
Clan
It is composed of several parties - groups of hunters who (usually) stuck together. It is also known as an overseer of organized group of different parties that joined under one banner. The structural design of the organization is always depended on the personal choice of what type of organization will envision by the clan master and its people.
Treasure Hunters
The most profitable career in the entire world of the series. Holds the most coveted of professions. They travel to ruins all over the world; treasure vaults that depicts lost civilization, to obtain the Relics.The job is perilous, but with enough talent, hunters could score power, fame, and wealth - the kinds of splendor only nobility or renowned merchants could hope to obtain.
Treasure Vaults
It is present in every corner of the world - and they contain relics loaded with amazing powers. These relics bring wealth, fame, and above all, power. The era belongs to treasure hunters, brave souls who plumb the depths of these vaults, risking danger for a shot at the glory found within.
Relics
The priceless item that hunters seek within the vaults. Just like the phantom beasts and the vaults themselves, these relics are remnants of past civilization drawn back into reality by the mana material. Among them are many extremely precious, powerful, and useful objects that modern civilization has long since forgotten how to replicate.
Red Party
The treasure hunters and bandit groups who are blacklisted as criminals.
Mana Materials
This is the power that is created by the world, it is a substance that is invisible to the eyes but exists everywhere. Treasure Hunters gain transcendal power by absorbing high concentration of Mana Material that fill the air in Treasure Vaults.

== Races ==
Humans
They are the predominant race in the series. They have a short lifespan and average level of mana capacity unlike the Noble Spirits. The only exception to the rule is Lucia Rogier who receives a harsh training to increase her mana capacity higher than the Noble Spirits.
Noble Spirits
They are composed of beautiful human-like features with a sharp ear. They have a long lifespan and large mana capacity unlike human race.
Half-Spirits
They are born half-human and half-spirit. They are extremely rare and they are considered as a taboo by the Noble spirits.
Phantoms
They are powerful inhabitants that are born after the accumulated Mana Material within the vault. They are also called 'Illusions' because when they are exterminated, they disappear without a corpse. However, the exterminated phantoms sometimes drop an items like relics.
Monsters
They are natural creatures that could be found in the world. They are dangerous, ruthless, and barbaric inhabitants that are roaming freely in the world.

== Media ==
=== Light novel ===
Written by Tsukikage, Let This Grieving Soul Retire began serialization on the user-generated novel publishing website Shōsetsuka ni Narō on January 27, 2018. It was later acquired by Micro Magazine who began releasing it with illustrations by Chyko under their GC Novels light novel imprint on August 30, 2018. Fourteen volumes have been released as of June 2026.

On November 6, 2020, Sol Press announced that they licensed light novels and released the first volume digitally on December 28 that same year. After Sol Press went defunct, J-Novel Club announced during their Anime Expo 2022 panel that they licensed the light novels.

No.	Title	Original release date	English release date
1	Stifled Shadow	August 30, 2018; 978-4-89637-813-9	December 28, 2020 (SP); March 8, 2023 (JNC); 978-1-7183-9252-6
1. "Dealing with Slave Labor"; 2. "Wall Spaghetti"; 3. "The White Wolf's Den"; 4. "Thousand Tricks"; Prologue: "A Dream and Its Fruition"; Epilogue: "Let This Grieving Soul Retire!"; Interlude: "The Prodigy"; Side Story: "A Day with Tino"
2	—	January 30, 2019; 978-4-89637-852-8	July 5, 2023; 978-1-7183-9254-0
3	—	August 30, 2019; 978-4-89637-912-9	January 16, 2024; 978-1-7183-9256-4
4	—	January 30, 2020; 978-4-89637-974-7	May 10, 2024; 978-1-7183-9258-8
5	—	August 31, 2020; 978-4-86716-047-3	September 9, 2024; 978-1-7183-9260-1
6	—	February 27, 2021; 978-4-86716-113-5	January 13, 2025; 978-1-7183-9262-5
7	—	August 30, 2021; 978-4-86716-174-6	May 19, 2025; 978-1-7183-9264-9
8	—	February 28, 2022; 978-4-86716-256-9	October 6, 2025; 978-1-7183-9266-3
9	—	October 28, 2022; 978-4-86716-357-3	February 11, 2026; 978-1-7183-9268-7
10	—	May 30, 2023; 978-4-86716-428-0	June 24, 2026; 978-1-7183-9270-0
11	—	February 29, 2024; 978-4-86716-539-3	October 28, 2026; 978-1-7183-9272-4
12	—	September 30, 2024; 978-4-86716-638-3	—
SS	—	March 31, 2025; 978-4-86716-740-3	—
13	—	September 30, 2025; 978-4-86716-843-1; 978-4-86716-844-8 (SE)	—
14	—	June 30, 2026; 978-4-86716-992-6	—

=== Manga ===
A manga adaptation illustrated by Rai Hebino began serialization on Kadokawa's ComicWalker manga website on April 27, 2019. The manga adaptation's chapters have been collected by ASCII Media Works into thirteen volumes as of July 2026.

On May 21, 2021, Yen Press announced that they licensed the manga adaptation.

No.	Original release date	Original ISBN	English release date	English ISBN
1	October 26, 2019	978-4-04-912839-0	December 21, 2021	978-1-9753-3447-5
2	March 27, 2020	978-4-04-913116-1	March 29, 2022	978-1-9753-3449-9
3	August 26, 2020	978-4-04-913350-9	July 12, 2022	978-1-9753-3451-2
4	February 27, 2021	978-4-04-913652-4	December 13, 2022	978-1-9753-4296-8
5	September 27, 2021	978-4-04-913980-8	April 18, 2023	978-1-9753-4534-1
6	May 27, 2022	978-4-04-914314-0	August 22, 2023	978-1-9753-6187-7
7	November 25, 2022	978-4-04-914736-0	November 21, 2023	978-1-9753-7353-5
8	August 25, 2023	978-4-04-915223-4	August 20, 2024	978-1-9753-9286-4
9	February 26, 2024	978-4-04-915552-5	February 18, 2025	979-8-8554-0865-2
10	September 27, 2024	978-4-04-915990-5	February 20, 2026	979-8-8554-1915-3
11	April 25, 2025	978-4-04-916458-9	November 24, 2026	979-8-8554-3395-1
12	November 27, 2025	978-4-04-916807-5	—	—
13	July 27, 2026	978-4-04-952362-1	—	—

=== Anime ===
An anime television series adaptation was announced on February 20, 2024. It is produced by Zero-G and directed by Masahiro Takata, with series composition by Hideki Shirane, Yūsuke Isouchi and Shingo Fujisaki designing the characters, and Ryōhei Sataka composing the music. The series aired in split-cours, with the first part aired from October 1 to December 24, 2024, on Tokyo MX and other networks. The opening theme song is "Kattō Tomorrow" (葛藤Tomorrow; Conflict Tomorrow), performed by Lezel, while the ending theme song is "Scream!" (すくりぃむ！; Sukuriimu!), performed by Pmaru-sama. Crunchyroll streamed the series. Muse Communication licensed the series in South and Southeast Asia.

Following the airing of the final episode of the first part, a second part was announced, which aired from October 6 to December 15, 2025. The opening theme song is "Algorithm" (アルゴリズム, Arugorizumu), performed by Kiyono Yasuno, while the ending theme song is "Yume no Hitokakera" (夢へのヒトカケラ; 'Fragment of a Dream'), performed by Iris.

==== Episodes ====
No.	Title	Directed by (Note: Production staff information is taken from the ending credits of each episode.)	Written by	Storyboarded by	Original release date (Note: Episodes are released on ABEMA, dAnime Store, Crunchyroll and simulcast platforms by Muse 2 days before their televised airings.)
Part 1
1	"Today, I Just Want to Go Home"; Transliteration: "Kyō wa Kono Mama Kaeritai" (Japanese: 今日はこのまま帰りたい)	Takeshi Shiga	Hideki Shirane	Masahiro Takata	October 1, 2024
Krai Andrey is the master of the clan named First Steps. Although he would prefer to retire, he cannot find an opportunity or the right time to do so. Krai explains in detail how he ended up in this situation.
2	"I Want to Leave It to Tino and Take It Easy"; Transliteration: "Tino ni Makasete Raku Shitai" (Japanese: ティノに任せてラクしたい)	Takuya Kondo	Hideki Shirane	Daiji Iwanaga	October 8, 2024
Tino has received a mission from Krai. But before she can set out, she needs a few strong members for her group. Greg, Rhuda, and Gilbert are already ready.
3	"I Want to Fly Straight Through the Sky"; Transliteration: "Massugu Sora o Tonde Mitai" (Japanese: まっすぐ空を飛んでみたい)	Takeshi Toda	Daisuke Ishibashi	Shin Matsuo	October 15, 2024
Tino and her group are fighting against a phantom even before they enter the treasure chamber. In the process, they realize that their opponent is significantly stronger than level 3. Meanwhile, Krai rushes to them to save them from their terrible fate.
4	"The Mysterious Mask Wants to Fight"; Transliteration: "Nazo no Kamen wa Sentō Shitai" (Japanese: 謎の仮面は戦闘したい)	Shogo Shimizu, Masato Uchibori & Masahiro Takata	Shirane Hideki	Akihiro Okuzawa	October 22, 2024
Krai and Tino's group wander through the White Wolf's building. The group believes that Krai knows where the exit is located. However, he is clueless. Then, they suddenly encounter the survivors they were trying to rescue.
5	"I Want to Leave Everything to Ark"; Transliteration: "Zenbu Āku ni Makasetai" (Japanese: 全部アークにまかせたい)	Takeshi Shiga	Daisuke Ishibashi	Akira Nishimori	October 29, 2024
A long time ago, Sitri entrusted Krai with one of her alchemy creations: a slime powerful enough to destroy all of Zebrudia. When Krai discovers the slime is missing, he scrambles to recover it before chaos ensues.
6	"I Want to Sleep Instead of Taking Charge"; Transliteration: "Shiki wa Torazu ni Nete Itai" (Japanese: 指揮は取らずに寝ていたい)	Takaji Asami	Sada Kento	Iwanaga Daiji	November 5, 2024
The Akashic Tower decides on an all out war against the hunters because they falsely believe that Krai found their facility. Independent of that, Krai's careless words cause a huge group of hunters to be sent to the White Wolf's Den.
7	"The Akashic Tower Wants to Experiment"; Transliteration: "Akasha no Tō wa Jikken Shitai" (Japanese: アカシャの塔は実験したい)	Takeshi Shiga	Masahiro Takata	Shin Matsuo	November 12, 2024
Sitri is finally back, but instead of focusing on the slime, she gives Krai an ominous warning. That at this rate, the entire investigation team will perish. The lethal battle between hunters and the Akashic Tower has been kicked off!
8	"I Want to Rush In When It's Over"; Transliteration: "Owatta Koro ni Kaketsuketai" (Japanese: 終わった頃に駆けつけたい)	Keita Nakano	Shirane Hideki	Takashi Asami	November 19, 2024
Sitri saves the day. Flustered, the Akashic Tower's members ignore Sophia's orders and self-destruct. As Sitri has figured out their headquarters, the hunters press on. Flick uses his lightning spell on them all, and for a moment it seems it is all over.
9	"I Want to Spread Love and Peace"; Transliteration: "Ai to Heiwa o Tsutaetai" (Japanese: 愛と平和を伝えたい)	Li Dongyi	Shirane Hideki	Shin Matsuo	November 26, 2024
The hunters are faced with chimeras and a giant golem. The intense battle suddenly comes to an end when Krai arrives. The next day Noctus and the other members of the Akashic Tower are finally reunited with Sophia. But she is acting strange, and then a certain someone appears.
10	"I Want to Be Renowned in the Capital"; Transliteration: "Teito de Buibui Iwasetai" (Japanese: 帝都でぶいぶい言わせたい)	Yuji Kanzaki	Sada Kento	Yanyong Daci	December 3, 2024
The Dragon Slayer Arnold Hail is level 7 and he proudly rolls into the capital with his party "Falling Fog", but Krai doesn't even show a shred of interest. Meanwhile, getting his relics charged is causing quite commotion.
11	"The Falling Fog Wants Revenge"; Transliteration: "Kiri no Rairyū wa Fukushū Shitai" (Japanese: 霧の雷竜は復讐したい)	Takuya Kondo	Daisuke Ishibashi	Takashi Asami	December 10, 2024
The Falling Fog came to the capital to make a name for themselves, instead they get disgraced. To regain their honor, Arnold sets his sights on Krai, but he is preoccupied with how to repay his immense debt to Sitri. When chance brings them together, a fierce battle unfolds...
12	"If Possible, I'd Like to Get It"; Transliteration: "Dekiru Kotonara Nyūshu Shitai" (Japanese: 出来ることなら入手したい)	Takeshi Shiga	Shirane Hideki	Daiji Iwanaga	December 17, 2024
Krai discovers an exceptional relic that'll soon go to the auction. Since he really wants it, he contacts the seller directly. But that turns out to be Arnold, and Krai's clumsy negotiation skill backfires completely. Others people then butt in and the relic goes to the auction anyway.
13	"I Want to Win the Bid No Matter What"; Transliteration: "Nani ga Nani Demo Rakusatsu Shitai" (Japanese: 何が何でも落札したい)	Yuki Kanzaki	Shirane Hideki	Toshihiko Masuda	December 24, 2024
The auction has finally begun. Krai is fixated on the one relic only, but then one fun relic after the other goes up for auction. When his resolve finally breaks, bidding for the golem Akasha starts. Since Sitri has been wanting it, Krai gives up on the relic and goes all in on the golem. Who will get the mask then?.
Part 2
14	"I Want to Talk About My Memories"; Transliteration: "Omoide Banashi o Kataritai" (Japanese: 思い出話を語りたい)	Takeshi Shiga	Shirane Hideki & Sada Kento	Daiji Iwanaga & Futoshi Higashide	October 6, 2025
Tino talks about the day she first met the Grieving Souls five years ago.
15	"At This Rate, I'd Rather Be Somewhere Else"; Transliteration: "Kō Narya Doko ka ni Tabidachitai" (Japanese: こうなりゃどこかに旅立ちたい)	Takeshi Shiga	Shirane Hideki	Hitoyuki Matsui & Masahiro Takata	October 13, 2025
16	"I Want to Leave the City's Peace to You"; Transliteration: "Machi no Heiwa wa Makasetai" (Japanese: 街の平和はまかせたい)	Takashi Toda	Sada Kento	Futoshi Higashide	October 20, 2025
17	"I'll Pass on the Strong Monsters"; Transliteration: "Tsuyoi Mamono wa Pasu Shitai" (Japanese: 強い魔物はパスしたい)	Masahiko Suzuki	Sada Kento	Masahiko Suzuki & Masahiro Takata	October 27, 2025
18	"I Want to Soak It Up in the Hot Springs"; Transliteration: "Nonbiri Onsen Tsukaritai" (Japanese: のんびり温泉浸かりたい)	Takashi Toda	Daisuke Ishibashi	Hitoyuki Matsui, Futoshi Higashide & Masahiro Takata	November 3, 2025
19	"Somehow or Another, I'd Like to Get Out"; Transliteration: "Dōnika Kō ni ka Kirinuketai" (Japanese: どうにかこうにか切り抜けたい)	Hisaya Takabayashi	Daisuke Ishibashi	Futoshi Higashide & Masahiro Takata	November 10, 2025
20	"I Want to Hand Out Gifts to Everyone"; Transliteration: "Achikochi o Miyage Watashitai" (Japanese: あちこちお土産渡したい)	Keita Nakano	Shirane Hideki	Tomomi Mochizuki	November 17, 2025
21	"I'd Rather Skip the Escort Quest"; Transliteration: "Goei no Tabi wa Enryo Shitai" (Japanese: 護衛の旅は遠慮したい)	Takuya Kondo	Shirane Hideki	Takuya Kondo	November 24, 2025
22	"The Nine-tailed Fox Wants to Move in the Shadows"; Transliteration: "Kyūbi no Kitsune wa Anyaku Shitai" (Japanese: 九尾の狐は暗躍したい)	Harumichi Nakahara	Sada Kento	Futoshi Higashide	December 1, 2025
23	"I'm Grateful for the Assistance of My Friends"; Transliteration: "Nakama no Hosa ni Kansha Shitai" (Japanese: 仲間の補佐に感謝したい)	Hidehiko Kadota	Daisuke Ishibashi	Shin Matsuo	December 8, 2025
24	"I Want to Have a Big Laugh at the End"; Transliteration: "Saigo wa Nikkori Waraitai" (Japanese: 最後はにっこり笑いたい)	Takeshi Shiga	Shirane Hideki	Masahiro Takata	December 15, 2025

== Reception ==
The series was ranked tenth in 2024 edition of Takarajimasha's Kono Light Novel ga Sugoi! guidebook in the tankōbon category.

The series had over 1 million copies in circulation by June 2023.
