= Yasuko Watanabe (color designer) =

Japanese animator & character designer

Yasuko Watanabe 渡辺 康子
- Born: Akita Prefecture, Japan
- Education: Yoyogi Animation Academy
- Occupations: Color designer, colorist
- Years active: 2000–present
- Employer: Shaft (2000–present)
- Known for: Monogatari series (2014–); March Comes In like a Lion

Yasuko Watanabe (Japanese: 渡辺康子, Hepburn: Watanabe Yasuko) is a Japanese color designer and colorist.

== Early life ==
Watanabe was part of her high school's anime research club when she found a particular interest in the use of colors in anime and decided to get a job as a colorist in the industry. After graduating high school, she went to Yoyogi Animation Academy and graduated in 2000.

== Career ==
She joined Shaft the year as a cel-colorist (analog) and digital colorist. Much of her early work consisted of doing the coloring for outsources given to Shaft, before gradually shifting into in-house production as Shaft itself shifted to in-house production. In 2004, Shaft split its digital coloring and compositing teams into their own department, Digital@Shaft, which Watanabe became a part of. Her first work as a color designer was also an outsource, however: Shattered Angels, which was produced by studio TNK, contacted Shaft for color design work, and both she and her senior (Hitoshi Hibino) did the color designs for the show. It wasn't until seven years later, in 2014, that she made her debut as a color designer in-house at Shaft with Hanamonogatari (with Hibino). The following year, she made her debut as solo color designer on Gourmet Girl Graffiti.

In 2022, Shaft opened a new studio in Shizuoka Prefecture with the hopes of expanding the company's production capacity outside of Tokyo. In order to set up operations and train new staff, several members of the main Tokyo branch would need to transfer to Shizuoka to perform these duties. Shaft's CEO, Mitsutoshi Kubota, offered Watanabe the opportunity and, despite having never lived in Shizuoka Prefecture, she agreed to the transfer and became a studio chief.

== Works ==
This is an incomplete list.

=== Teleivison series ===
Year	Title	Director(s)	Studio	Color designer	Other role(s)	Ref(s)
2007	Shattered Angels	Tetsuya Yanagisawa	TNK	Yes	No	
2014	Hanamonogatari	Akiyuki Shinbo; Tomoyuki Itamura	Shaft	Yes		
2015	Gourmet Girl Graffiti	Akiyuk Shinbo; Naoyuki Tatsuwa	Shaft	Yes		
2015	Nisekoi:	Akiyuki Shinbo; Yukihiro Miyamoto	Shaft	Yes		
2015	Owarimonogatari	Akiyuki Shinbo; Tomoyuki Itamura	Shaft	Yes		
2016–2017	March Comes In like a Lion	Akiyuki Shinbo; Kenjirou Okada	Shaft	Yes		
2017	Owarimonogatari II	Akiyuki Shinbo; Tomoyuki Itamura	Shaft	Yes		
2017–2018	March Comes In like a Lion 2nd Season	Akiyuki Shinbo; Kenjirou Okada	Shaft	Yes		
2019	Zoku Owarimonogatari	Akiyuki Shinbo	Shaft	Yes		
2021	Pretty Boy Detective Club	Akiyuki Shinbo; Hajime Ootani	Shaft	Yes		
2025	Ninja to Koroshiya no Futarigurashi	Yukihiro Miyamoto	Shaft	Yes		

=== OVAs/ONAs ===
Year	Title	Director(s)	Studio	Color designer	Other role(s)	Ref(s)
2016	Koyomimonogatari	Akiyuki Shinbo; Tomoyuki Itamura	Shaft	Yes		
2016	Nisekoi:	Akiyuki Shinbo; Yukihiro Miyamoto	Shaft	Yes		
2016–2017	The Beheading Cycle: The Blue Savant and the Nonsense Bearer	Akiyuki Shinbo; Yuki Yase	Shaft	Yes		
2019	Ikebukuro	Yukio Takatsu	Shaft	Yes		
2021–2022	Assault Lily Fruits	Shouji Saeki	Shaft	Yes		
2024	Monogatari Series Off & Monster Season	Akiyuki Shinbo; Midori Yoshizawa	Shaft	Yes		

=== Films ===
Year	Title	Director(s)	Studio	Color designer	Other role(s)	Ref(s)
2025	Virgin Punk: Clockwork Girl	Yasuomi Umetsu	Shaft	Yes		
