= Yasuko Watanabe =

Yasuko Watanabe may refer to:

- Yasuko Watanabe, Japanese woman murdered in 1997, see murder of Yasuko Watanabe
- Yasuko Watanabe (color designer), Japanese color designer and colorist
