= Puella Magi Madoka Magica: Walpurgisnacht: Rising =

2026 Japanese anime film

- Puella Magi Madoka Magica -Walpurgisnacht: Rising-
- Promotional poster featuring main characters Madoka Kaname and Homura Akemi
- 劇場版 魔法少女まどか☆マギカ〈ワルプルギスの廻天〉 Gekijōban Mahō Shōjo Madoka Magika 〈Warupurugisu no Kaiten〉
- Genre: Dark fantasy; Magical girl
- Created by: Magica Quartet: Akiyuki Shinbo; Gen Urobuchi; Ume Aoki; Shaft
- Directed by: Akiyuki Shinbo (Note: Chief Director (総監督).); Yukihiro Miyamoto
- Screenplay by: Gen Urobuchi (Note: The second half of the film's screenplay was revised by Doroinu of Gekidan Inu Curry by request of Shinbo when Urobuchi was unable to complete the revisions himself. Shinbo also requested Shaft's producer, Miku Ooshima, to rewrite the lines of dialogue for the character Wasu. Both received credit under "screenplay assistance.")
- Character designer: Junichirou Taniguchi
- Music by: Yuki Kajiura
- Country of origin: Japan
- Original language: Japanese

Production
- Art directors: Ken Naitou; Shuuichi Kusamori
- Sound director: Youta Tsuruoka
- Cinematographer: Takayuki Aizu
- Color designers: Hitoshi Hibino; Yasuko Watanabe
- CG directors: Shichirou Etou; Hisato Shima; Takuji Gojima; Arisa Kosaka; Shuntarou Kaneko
- Editor: Rie Matsubara
- Animation producers: Yuuya Matsukawa; Masaru Hashimoto
- Studio: Shaft
- Producers: Tatsuya Ishikawa; Miku Ooshima; Hiroyuki Kobayashi; Satoshi Tamura; Toshihiro Maeda; Fumi Miura
- Production companies: Madoka Project; Aniplex; Shaft; Houbunsha; Nitroplus; MBS; Movic
- Distributor: Animec
- Runtime: 120 minutes

Original release
- Release: August 28, 2026

Puella Magi Madoka Magica: Walpurgisnacht: Rising (Note: Puella Magi Madoka Magica: Walpurgisnacht: Rising (Japanese: 劇場版 魔法少女まどか☆マギカ ワルプルギスの廻天, Hepburn: Gekijōban Mahō Shōjo Madoka Magika: Warupurugisu no Kaiten)) is a 2026 Japanese animated dark fantasy action film produced by Shaft based on the 2011 anime television series. It is a sequel to Puella Magi Madoka Magica: Rebellion (2013) and was released in Japan on August 28, 2026. The film will be released in North America by Aniplex of America in January 2027.

== Plot ==
Following the events of Rebellion, new magical girls are no longer created in Mitakihara City. Instead, ordinary girls who find a rumored "Lizard Phone" may make a deal with Homura to temporarily become magical girls and fight Wraiths using her power.

On her way to school, Madoka is approached by Walpurgisnacht ("Wasu") in the form of a magical girl. Wasu is overjoyed to have finally reunited with Madoka, whom she calls "Marguerite." That night, Wasu and two other new magical girls—Zi Ding Xiang and Selema—prevent anyone from answering the Lizard Phone. They then infiltrate Mitakihara's magical girls, approaching and befriending Nagisa, Mami, and Kyoko in turn.

After school, Wasu waits for Madoka in her home and attempts to restore her as the Law of Cycles. Homura stops her by pulling them both into an illusion, but is defeated by the intervention of Zi Ding Xiang and Selema, who claim to be Witches who lost sight of the Law of Cycles.

Sayaka begins to harbor doubts of the new magical girls and of her own rewritten memories, and convenes Mitakihara's magical girls in secret. When they refuse to entertain her suspicions, she is approached by Homura, with whom she reluctantly forms an alliance. They follow Wasu to Nazukasokotsune, a realm outside time where the identities of all Witches are recorded. There, Homura realizes Wasu's true identity and Sayaka remembers her past as a Witch.

Xi Ding Xiang eventually grows disgusted of playing along with the magical girls' happiness, and attacks Madoka. Though she is defeated by Kyoko, Selema takes the opportunity to kidnap Madoka and attempts to transform her into a Witch.

Having escaped from Nazukasokotsune, Homura and Sayaka ally with Wasu after being informed by the remaining magical girls of Madoka's plight. As Wasu moves to rescue Madoka, she remembers her original life as Marguerite, a magical girl who wished to save all other magical girls from dissolving into curses, preserving their individuality as Witches.

The rest of the magical girls defeat Selma, and Madoka regains her awareness and memories. She rejects Homura's pleas to stay, and moves to rejoin with the Law of Cycles. Encouraged by the rest of the magical girls, Homura reasserts her promise and obsession with Madoka and briefly holds the Law of Cycles at bay.

On a bench somewhere, Madoka pets a sleeping Homura and asks whether she would forgive her if "this world strayed from someone’s ideal." Meanwhile, Law of Cycles returns and launches an attack that knocks out Homura. Madoka speaks to the Law of Cycles and sheds a tear, upon which it turns back and fades away. Back at the bench, Madoka is nowhere to be seen, but her voice reaffirms she is still there, as Homura smiles and sleeps peacefully. Out in the desert, an abandoned Lizard Phone continues to ring.

In a post-credits scene, Kyubey appears in Nazukasokotsune, intrigued at its discovery. As the Lizard Phone rings, a hand appears and answers it.

- Puella Magi Madoka Magica: Walpurgisnacht: Rising
- Anime film

Concept Movie
- Directed by: Akiyuki Shinbo
- Music by: Yuki Kajiura
- Studio: Shaft
- Released: November 27, 2015
- Runtime: 4 minutes

== Production ==
In 2015, the Madoka Magica staff released a short concept movie released in two versions at the Madogatari exhibitions in Tokyo and Osaka for Shaft's 40th anniversary. Akiyuki Shinbo, Ume Aoki, Gekidan Inu Curry, and Junichirou Taniguchi returned in their respective positions, while Yukihiro Miyamoto took on the role of unit director. According to Shaft's president, Mitsutoshi Kubota, the concept film was meant to launch the start of a new Madoka Magica project in which the short's ideas would serve as the base.

It was not until the 10th anniversary event held on April 25, 2021, that a sequel movie to Rebellion was announced, titled Walpurgisnacht: Rising (ワルプルギスの廻天, Warupurugisu no Kaiten). In August 2023, additional information about the film was revealed at Aniplex Online Fest 2023 on September 10. It released an official trailer and was originally scheduled to be released in 2024, however, was later delayed to Q1 2025, not released on that period either. It was to premiere in February 2026 but later delayed to August 28 due to production circumstances. Shinbo, Miyamoto, Kajiura, Taniguchi, and Urobuchi were all announced to be returning in their respective roles, while only one half of Gekidan Inu Curry, Doroinu, would return as the alternate space designer.

With the announcement of the work, Aniplex's CEO Atsuhiro Iwakami apologized to fans for the long wait saying that it took longer than expected to solidify plans, and Kubota specified that it was difficult to reach a point where they thought "This is it!" Kubota also noted the difference in production methods over the ten-year gap, saying that all of the drawing at Shaft was now being done digitally as well as the commonplaceness of 3DCG animation (and Shaft developing its own CG-specific department). Lead writer Gen Urobuchi also revealed on Twitter that the script for the movie was written after he finished working on Kamen Rider Gaim, and before work had begun on Thunderbolt Fantasy. Unlike the film trilogy and the series, Takahiro Kishida is no longer credited as a character designer, the role of which is being entirely headed by Taniguchi, and Kubota mentioned that he was refining the designs. While Taniguchi returned from the previous installments in the series, including Shaft's adaptation of the Magia Record mobile game, the animation designs were created with fundamentally different base designs. According to Aniplex producer Tatsuya Ishikawa, Aoki's style had changed since the beginning of the series and even since Magia Record. The staff also intended to make the characters look more like the concept art, so Aoki redesigned the draft designs from scratch. Selema Terez and Zi Ding Xiang, two new characters, originated from Shinbo's concepts with design elements influenced by Urobuchi's ideas. Design progress for the film progressed gradually throughout the years, with Madoka's costume design for the 2015 concept movie, originally produced for the Shaft Madogatari 40th Anniversary Event, becoming an accidental prototype to her eventual design in the film. Pre-production started around the fall of 2021.

Urobuchi started work on the script in 2014, the year after Rebellion was released but found difficulty coming up with a scenario as he had "no ideas" for what to do next with the series. Hearing about his predicament, Iwakami presented Urobuchi with Doroinu's sketches and concept designs that laid out a variety of possible characters, story elements, and the like, which Urobuchi believed there to be enough of to use as a general base. Rather than creating his own story from scratch, he thought it would be interesting to take another creator's ideas and to both structure and organize a story out of those core concepts rather than trying to come up with the foundations himself. He thought writing the screenplay was an easy task and instead had more difficulty deciding on how to condense the plethora of information he chose to work with and whether or not he should split the film idea into two parts. Urobuchi considers himself to have been a writer more so in charge of putting together a compilation of ideas that weren't his rather than creating his own story. From the start, Shinbo envisioned The Happy Prince as a theme and wanted to have the story about Walpurgisnacht. Like with Rebellion, once Urobuchi finished the screenplay, Shinbo asked him if he could revise it to instead focus more on Madoka as the central theme rather than Homura. Due to scheduling conflicts and Urobuchi having no ideas for how to meet Shinbo's requests, he gave permission for the staff to use or revise the screenplay as they saw fit. Around 2021 or 2022, after considering rewriting the script and making a new version entirely, the staff decided to use Urobuchi's original script with revisions. According to him, the first half of the script was mostly kept as he had written it, while the second half received more significant revisions. Doroinu spearheaded the majority of the revisions for the film's second half with changes like Walpurgisnacht's background being complimented by Urobuchi for both expanding on and simplifying his work. Shinbo did not want Madoka to be completely sidelined in the movie, but he also did not want her to be a "stereotypical good student", and worked to try and find a middle ground. During production, Urobuchi stayed relatively hands-off from the project, but attended some of the voice recording sessions and discussed lines of dialogue and certain performances with sound director Youta Tsuruoka. Similarities between the film and Magia Record were noted, like the existence of uwasa (rumors) and narrative devices like "confidential conversations", which Urobuchi explained as the result of utilizing Doroinu's notebook. Despite the film releasing nearly nine years after the mobile game, which Doroinu was also involved with as well as being the chief director of its anime adaptation, said details in Walpurgisnacht predate the conception of Magia Record itself, with the shared aspects between them simply being Doroinu's core ideas. Likewise, the addition of the two new characters predated Magia Record as well, and thus Urobuchi did not feel worried about how they compared.

With the script in place, a storyboard artist was needed. According to Iwakami, Kubota watched the Revue Starlight Movie directed by Tomohiro Furukawa and was impressed with the work which led to Furukawa being asked to storyboard the movie.

For the music, Kajiura noted that she was essentially given free rein with what to compose besides basic instructions for certain parts that asked for "upbeat" music and the like. Having watched a version of the incomplete film during the scoring process, she intended to use her own interpretation of the work as the basis for her music. Rather than compose emotionally-driven music, Kajiura paid more attention to "not giving the audience answers" or "hints to the answers" through emotionally evocative music, and she also meant to allow silence at points in the film for the audience to ponder, a process which she said would have been easier if she was simply instructed to make beautiful music. When she eventually handed the music to the production staff, she intended to make any corrections they deemed necessary, but was given the OK. The theme song for the film is "Kanata" (彼方; "Beyond") by FictionJunction, which was released on September 2, 2026.

Miyamoto humorously shared a similar perspective on his role as director to Urobuchi's role as scriptwriter, saying he was not so much of a creator as he was a compiler of other people's creations for the film and that his role hadn't changed from the original TV series. According to him, early on in the film's development, Shinbo had the idea of using 3D to model the town and instead of using a physical barrier to physically surround it, make it like an island geographically separated from the outside world. Doroinu also had the idea of rendering Walpurgis entirely in 3D and then touching it up to look like paper cut-out animation. While Miyamoto initially believed that utilizing CG on such a large scale would have been impossible, the team eventually was able to make part of the city and certain elements of it completely in 3D. Unlike the previous entries in the franchise, the studio also opted to use 3D layouts (3DLOs) to assist with the background process. Shinbo also had the idea of adding drones throughout the film, so Miyamoto adjusted Furukawa's storyboards by adding them into different places. He also had Kazuki Kawata, one of Shaft's main animators and the co-concept designer alongside Furukawa, adjust the storyboards right before the V-editing stage near the end of the film, and Kawata added three cuts of animation which were animated and processed in around two days.

Shaft's 3D team, led by CG directors Hisato Shima and Shinichirou Etou, was mainly concerned with the 3DLOs and applying textures. While the team had used Lightwave 3D for Magia Record, they fully switched to Autodesk Maya for this film. The use of the 3DLOs also differed from standard productions in which those 3DLOs are created right from the storyboards and then checked and passed along to the 2D animation staff for use in their scenes. For Walprugisnacht, the 2D animation staff instead drew their own layouts, and Shaft's CG team was instead responsible for recreating those layouts in 3D and, after approval, sending them to an external team to be rendered in CG. Another CG studio, Tri-Slash, whose team was led by CG director Takuji Gojima, was mainly responsible for processing Doroinu's concepts into 3D. Tri-Slash tends to work on projects with cel-shaded animation which the film is mostly devoid of, which the staff called unusual for them. Kayac, led by visual effects supervisor Kiyoyuki Amano, was mainly responsible for UI effects, simulations, animation materials, textures, and other miscellaneous jobs as an extension of the effects and textures the company had made for Magia Record. Kayac processed most of their material themselves up until it was handed over to Shaft for compositing.

Regarding the return to the main franchise after 13 years, and with Magia Record as a spin-off series, Shinbo said that he and the staff weren't concerned with making it "Madoka-like." While he noted that other creators may consciously develop ideas that constitute being "Madoka-like" if they intend to make their own projects like Madoka, as the creators and staff of the project, the Madoka staff make it "normally." Aniplex publicity producer Satomi Takahashi noted that the atmospheric prioritization was less about following that constitution of what is or isn't "Madoka-like", and instead focusing on making something "new."

== See also ==
- List of films featuring time loops

== Notes ==
=== Works cited ===
- Newtype (August 10, 2025). Newtype September 2026 (in Japanese). Kadokawa Shoten.
- Magica Quartet (August 28, 2026). Puella Magi Madoka Magica: Walpurgisnacht - Rising Theater Pamphlet (in Japanese).
- Kashimura, Kazuhito, ed. (2026). SCREENα 劇場版『魔法少女まどかマギカ〈ワルプルギスの廻天〉総力特集/超 2026年 10 月号 [Movie Puella Magi Madoka Magica: Walpurgisnacht - Rising | Comprehensive Feature/Super Issue | October 2026]. Japan Print.
- Sports Hochi (August 28, 2026). 『劇場版 魔法少女まどか☆マギカ 〈ワルプルギスの廻天〉』特別号 [Puella Magi Madoka Magica: Walpurgisnacht - Rising Special Edition] (in Japanese). Hochi Entertainment Market.
- S Editing Department (September 16, 2026). 季刊エス vol.95 10月号 [Kikan S Vol.96 October Edition] (in Japanese). PIE International.
- CGWorld Editing Department (November 10, 2026). CGWORLD Vol.340 (in Japanese). CGWorld.
