= Midori Yoshizawa =

Japanese animator & director

Midori Yoshizawa 吉澤 翠
- Education: Tama Art University
- Occupations: Animator, storyboard artist, director
- Years active: 2012–present
- Employer(s): Studio Luna (2012~2013); Toei Animation (2013~2014); Green Bear (2023~)

Midori Yoshizawa (Japanese: 吉澤 翠, Hepburn: Yoshizawa Midori) is a Japanese animator, storyboard artist, and director.

== Career ==
Yoshizawa studied at Tama Art University before getting her first job in the anime industry as an animator at Studio Luna around 2012. She worked at the studio for a year or two and then joined Toei Animation as an apprentice director working on One Piece. Around 2014, she left Toei and began freelancing for Shaft. Initially, she took on animation and assistant episode direction roles like her previous jobs but was being given episode direction duties across all of the studio's productions by 2015. She participated in several more from 2016 through 2018, and in 2019 was one of the episode directors and storyboard artists for Zoku Owarimonogatari. Longtime series and studio chief director Akiyuki Shinbo highlighted the fifth episode, which she directed, as being particularly interesting to him.

In 2019, she was involved with the studio's adaptation of the Magia Record mobile game, in the first season serving as a "director" (equivalent to a series director for a specific set of episodes) due to chief director Doroinu having no prior experience with directing a television anime. As such, Yoshizawa, Kenjirou Okada, and Yukihiro Miyamoto were chosen to supervise sets of episodes, with Miyamoto presiding as assistant director. The depiction in the 9th episode of the series, in which an AI gradually becomes more human, was broadly influenced by Yoshizawa herself. For the second and third seasons of the work, Miyamoto was promoted to series director under Doroinu, and Yoshizawa was promoted to assistant director. In the second episode of the second season, both Yoshizawa and Miyamoto were in charge of storyboarding the episode; but rather than splitting the content between the A and B-parts of the episode (the first and second halves), they split the content based on what they felt like depicting, such as Miyamoto taking charge of the action sequences.

Following the end of production on Magia Record, Yoshizawa took a break from directing duties and only contributed storyboards through 2022 and 2023, with the exception of supervising animator and first-time director Hiroto Nagata's opening for The Quintessential Quintuplets~. As Yoshizawa had directed the eleventh episode of the first season outsourced to Shaft in 2019, animation producer Yuuya Matsukawa appointed Yoshizawa to storyboard the second episode of the special; and Shaft was chosen to produce the special due to the popularity of Yoshizawa and Shaft's episode in the first season.

In the fall of 2022, Aniplex producer Tatsuya Ishikawa approached Shaft to continue the Monogatari series, and studio president Mitsutoshi Kubota selected Yoshizawa to be the new series director under Shinbo's chief direction, replacing prior series director Tomoyuki Itamura. Shinbo relied on Yoshizawa for her art design sensibilities and instilled changes to the series from her predecessors. In particular, he wanted Yoshizawa to use eyecatches with more freedom, and asked for one arc (Nademonogatari) to have eyecatches like the Dragon Ball book spines, and for another arc (Shinobumonogatari) to be like a tour of famous places in Japan. Although her directing debut, Yoshizawa said that because it was the first Monogatari series in several years, she didn't consciously direct the series especially "acrobatically" (アクロバティック).

=== Style ===
Yoshizawa's style, having started directing at Shaft almost immediately after her work on One Piece at Toei Animation, has been characterized as being largely based on Shaft's stylistic identity with attention given to the composition of "attractive shots" using animation, backgrounds, CG, and live-action elements, and her prior work as an animator has been described as leading to "troublesome" and ambitious sensibilities in regard to layouts. Yoshizawa has also prominently made use of unconventional materials not often used in televised anime such as paper cutouts, analog drawings, and hand-made puppets. Kevin Cirugeda differentiated Yoshizawa from other directors at the studio by considering her to be a more emotionally expressive storyteller, as opposed to the more logical- or abstraction-oriented directors. Specifically through her work on Monogatari Series & Off and Monster Season, her debut work as a director, her work has harkened back to the stylistic characteristics of her predecessors (Oishi and Itamura) while also invigorating the series with her own personality. Christopher Farris of Anime News Network considered her to have given the series a "fresh", new, and "active" look from Itamura's long directorial reign.

== Works ==
=== Teleivison series ===
In "Director(s)" column highlights Yoshizawa's directorial works.

Year	Title	Director(s)	Studio	SB (Note: Storyboard artist.)	ED (Note: Episode director, equivalent to unit director.)	Other roles and notes	Ref(s)
2012	Toriko	Akifumi Zako	Toei Animation	No	No	Key animator	
2012	Aesthetica of a Rogue Hero	Rion Kujou	Arms	No	No	2nd key animator	
2012	Little Busters!	Yoshiki Yamakawa	J.C.Staff	No	No	2nd key animator	
2012	Yu-Gi-Oh! Zexal II	Satoshi Kuwabara	Gallop	No	No	2nd key animator	
2013	One Piece	Hiroaki Miyamoto	Toei Animation	No	No	Episode director's assistant	
2014	Mekakucity Actors	Akiyuki Shinbo; Yuki Yase	Shaft	No	No	2nd key animator	
2014	Hanamonogatari	Akiyuki Shinbo; Tomoyuki Itamura	Shaft	No	No	2nd key animator	
2014	Tsukimonogatari	Akiyuki Shinbo; Tomoyuki Itamura	Shaft	No	No	Episode director's assistant	
2015	Gourmet Girl Graffiti	Akiyuki Shinbo; Naoyuki Tatsuwa	Shaft	No	Yes		
2015	Nisekoi:	Akiyuki Shinbo; Yukihiro Miyamoto	Shaft	No	Yes		
2015	Owarimonogatari	Akiyuki Shinbo; Tomoyuki Itamura	Shaft	No	Yes		
2016	March Comes In like a Lion	Akiyuki Shinbo; Kenjirou Okada	Shaft	Yes	Yes		
2017	March Comes In like a Lion 2nd Season	Akiyuki Shinbo; Kenjirou Okada	Shaft	Yes	Yes	2nd key animator	
2018	Fate/Extra: Last Encore	Akiyuki Shinbo; Yukihiro Miyamoto	Shaft	No	Yes	2nd key animator Background artist	
2019	Zoku Owarimonogatari	Akiyuki Shinbo	Shaft	Yes	Yes		
2019	The Quintessential Quintuplets	Satoshi Kuwabara	Tezuka Productions	No	Yes		
2020	Magia Record: Puella Magi Madoka Magica Side Story	Doroinu; Yukihiro Miyamoto; Kenjirou Okada; Midori Yoshizawa	Shaft	Yes	Yes	Opening director Ending director	
2021	Magia Record: Puella Magi Madoka Magica Side Story - The Eve of Awakening	Doroinu; Yukihiro Miyamoto	Shaft	Yes	Yes	Assistant director Transformation scene storyboard Opening director	
2022	Magia Record: Puella Magi Madoka Magica Side Story - Dawn of a Shallow Dream	Doroinu; Yukihiro Miyamoto	Shaft	Yes	Yes	Assistant director Opening director	
2022	RWBY: Ice Queendom	Toshimasa Suzuki; Kenjirou Okada	Shaft	Yes	No		
2023	Yohane the Parhelion: Sunshine in the Mirror	Asami Nakatani	Sunrise	Yes	No		
2023	The Quintessential Quintuplets~	Yukihiro Miyamoto	Shaft	Yes	No	Opening supervisor	
2025	A Ninja and an Assassin Under One Roof	Yukihiro Miyamoto	Shaft	Yes	Yes		
2026	Monogatari Off & Monster Season: Karen Ogre	Akiyuki Shinbo (chief); Midori Yoshizawa	Shaft	TBA	TBA		

=== OVAs/ONAs ===
Year	Title	Director(s)	Studio	SB	ED	Other roles and notes	Ref(s)
2016	Koyomimonogatari	Akiyuki Shinbo; Tomoyuki Itamura	Shaft	No	No	2nd key animator	
2024	Monogatari Series Off & Monster Season	Akiyuki Shinbo; Midori Yoshizawa	Shaft	Yes	Yes		

== Notes ==
=== Book citations ===
- Takahashi, Yumi, ed. (November 23, 2019). Akiyuki Shimbo x Shaft Chronicle (in Japanese). Dotcom. ISBN 978-4835457017.
- Maeda, Hisashi; Nakagami, Yoshikatsu; Kawabata, Takeshi; Nishitani, Nanako (2020). マギアレコード 魔法少女まどか☆マギカ外伝 TVアニメ公式ガイドブック 1巻 [Magia Record Puella Magi Madoka Magica TV Anime Official Guidebook Volume 1] (in Japanese). Houbunsha. ISBN 978-4832272019.
- Maeda, Hisashi; Nakagami, Yoshikatsu; Kawabata, Takeshi; Nishitani, Nanako (2022). マギアレコード 魔法少女まどか☆マギカ外伝 TVアニメ公式ガイドブック 2巻 [Magia Record Puella Magi Madoka Magica TV Anime Official Guidebook Volume 2] (in Japanese). Houbunsha. ISBN 978-4832274006.
