= Akuma no Memumemu-chan =

Japanese manga series

- First tankōbon volume cover

悪魔のメムメムちゃん
- Genre: Erotic comedy
- Manga
- Written by: Keitarō Yotsuya
- Published by: Shueisha
- Imprint: Jump Comics+
- Magazine: Shōnen Jump+
- Original run: July 26, 2016 – April 20, 2021
- Volumes: 12
- Original net animation
- Directed by: Seiya Numata
- Studio: Shaft
- Released: January 23, 2018
- Runtime: 5 minutes
- icon

Akuma no Memumemu-chan (悪魔のメムメムちゃん) is a Japanese manga series written and illustrated by Keitarō Yotsuya. It was serialized on Shueisha's online platform Shōnen Jump+ from July 2016 to April 2021, with its chapters collected in twelve tankōbon volumes. A 5-minute original net animation (ONA) produced by Shaft was released in January 2018.

== Characters ==
Memumemu (メムメム)
Voiced by: Karin Takahashi
A demon that has never taken a soul. Optimistic about taking Hyōta's soul, she visits Hyōta's house frequently. She has no talent as a demon because of her clumsiness and so little magic power that she shrinks when she uses it, though she recovers with a drop of energy drink or a small meal. She cries a lot and is servile and timid but takes advantage of any opportunity.
Hyōta Kohinata (小日向 日太, Kohinata Hyōta)
Voiced by: Aoi Yūki
A first-year high school student who lives in an apartment. When Memumemu comes to retrieve his soul, he feels bad for her.
Anzu Itsuki (五木 杏, Itsuki Anzu)
Voiced by: Hitomi Igarashi
Hyōta's classmate and the daughter of his landlord. Hyōta is secretly in love with her.
Landlord (大家, Ōya)
Voiced by: Mai Nakahara
Anzu's mother who has an extremely gentle personality. She is full of demon talents but is unaware of the existence of demons. Memumemu fears her as the "boss".

== Media ==
=== Manga ===
Written and illustrated by Keitarō Yotsuya, Akuma no Memumemu-chan was serialized in Shueisha's online platform Shōnen Jump+ from July 26, 2016, to April 20, 2021. Shueisha collected its chapters in twelve tankōbon volumes, released from November 4, 2016, to June 4, 2021.

==== Volumes ====
No.	Release date	ISBN
1	November 4, 2016	978-4-08-880868-0
2	March 3, 2017	978-4-08-881039-3
3	August 4, 2017	978-4-08-881136-9
4	December 4, 2017	978-4-08-881304-2
5	May 2, 2018	978-4-08-881494-0
6	November 2, 2018	978-4-08-881661-6
7	April 4, 2019	978-4-08-881821-4
8	August 2, 2019	978-4-08-882067-5
9	February 4, 2020	978-4-08-882195-5
10	July 3, 2020	978-4-08-882369-0
11	November 4, 2020	978-4-08-882542-7
12	June 4, 2021	978-4-08-882642-4

=== Original net animation ===
A 5-minute original net animation (ONA) adaptation produced by Shaft was released on January 23, 2018. It was directed by Seiya Numata and the character designs were done by Rina Iwamoto.

== Reception ==
In 2017, the series was ranked eleventh at the third Next Manga Awards in the web category.
