= Shouji Saeki =

Japanese animator

Shouji Saeki 佐伯 昭志
- Born: December 17, 1971 (age 53); Kanagawa Prefecture, Japan
- Education: Teikyo University
- Occupation(s): Director, storyboard artist, writer, animator
- Years active: 1996–present
- Employer: Gainax (1995–2015)
- Known for: Medaka Box; Assault Lily Bouquet

Shouji Saeki (Japanese: 佐伯 昭志, Hepburn: Saeki Shōji, born December 17, 1971) is a Japanese director, storyboard artist, writer, and animator known for directing and writing several series for studios Gainax and Shaft.

== Early life ==
During his days at Teikyo University, Saeki rented a room in the art club where he learned the basics of drawing on his own with the desire of making anime. After four years of collegial schooling, his motivation remained unchanged; and once he graduated, he joined studio Gainax.

== Career ==
He started as an in-between animator at the studio in 1996, and in 1998, the 25th episode of Cyber Team in Akihabara marked his first storyboard credit, and the following year marked his episode director debut and scriptwriting debut with Kare Kano, where at-the-time fellow Gainax director Hiroyuki Imaishi described that the both of them had "learned our chops." In 2002, Saeki served as assistant director under Hiroyuki Yamaga for the second season of Mahoromatic, Mahoromatic: Something More Beautiful, which marked his first work with Shaft. Following Mahoromatic, Saeki made his series directorial debut with the final Gainax/Shaft collaboration series (This Ugly yet Beautiful World (2004) and He Is My Master (2005)).

Some of the cast of Mahoromatic discussed the idea of doing another project together, and eventually This Ugly yet Beautiful World was created with some of the same cast and much of the same staff in mind. Saeki became the director of the work and he invited some staff who worked on the previous series like Shin Itagaki, Toshimasa Suzuki, and Atsushi Nishigori. Hiroyuki Yamaga, who was the co-series composition writer with Saeki, told him that there would be two heroines by way of a dual personality (referring to the character Hikari); and Saeki was given responsibility of deciding the setting, whether or not she and the hero would get together, and the story itself. Elements of the story were taken from a project that character designer Kazuhiro Takamura had concepted years prior while they had worked on Neon Genesis Evangelion, which Takamura had entitled Extended Definition; though, Takamura abstained from speaking on matters of the setting with Saeki and instead left the details of the work to him. Saeki had felt that his work on Mahoromatic was left unfinished due to the fact that for the second season, Yamaga had done the rough parts of the work and then handed it over to Saeki with the exception of the final part. Saeki felt like his work then remained unfinished as he was unable to complete it himself which he used as some motivation for This Ugly yet Beautiful World.

The following years saw Saeki working mainly as a storyboard artist, scriptwriter, and episode director for Shaft and Gainax series, and notably became an essential member of Hiroyuki Imaishi's team on Gurren Lagann. Between 2011 and 2016, Saeki acted as series director for three more projects with Gainax (Wish Upon the Pleiades (2011/2015), Medaka Box (2012), and Omoi no Kakera (2015)). Beginning in 2017, due to Gainax's minimal production output, Saeki began providing storyboards as a freelance artist. After providing storyboards for a few of Shaft's series in that time, he started freelancing as a series director with the studio, where he first directed Assault Lily Bouquet in 2020, and Luminous Witches in 2022.

According to animator Kazuya Shiotsuki, Saeki's prominence at Shaft has influenced the younger staff at the studio alongside Yasuomi Umetsu.

== Works ==
=== Television series ===
In "Director(s)" column highlights Saeki's directorial works.

Year	Title	Director(s)	Studio	SB (Note: Storyboard artist.)	ED (Note: Episode director, equivalent to unit director.)	SC (Note: Series composition.)	Script (Note: Script/screenplay.)	KA (Note: Key animator.)	Other roles and notes	Ref(s)
1998	Cyber Team in Akihabara	Yoshitaka Fujimoto	Ashi Productions	Yes	No	No	No	No		
1998	Lupin III: Tokyo Crisis	Toshiya Shinohara	TMS Entertainment	No	No	No	No	Yes		
1998	Battle Athletes Victory	Katsuhito Akiyama	AIC	No	No	No	No	Yes		
1998	Kare Kano	Hideaki Anno; Hiroki Sato (#16–26)	Gainax	Yes	Yes	No	Yes	Yes		
1999	Medabots	Tensai Okamura	Bee Train Production	Yes	No	No	No	No		
1999	Dai-Guard	Seiji Mizushima	Xebec	Yes	No	No	No	No		
1999	Cardcaptor Sakura	Morio Asaka	Madhouse	No	Yes	No	No	No		
2001	Mahoromatic: Automatic Maiden	Hiroyuki Yamaga	Gainax; Shaft	Yes	Yes	No	Yes	Yes		
2002	Mahoromatic: Something More Beautiful	Hiroyuki Yamaga	Gainax; Shaft	Yes	Yes	No	Yes	Yes	Assistant director	
2004	This Ugly yet Beautiful World	Shouji Saeki	Gainax; Shaft	Yes	Yes	Yes	Yes	No	Ending director and storyboard Image boards (uncredited)	
2004	Tsukuyomi: Moon Phase	Akiyuki Shinbo (chief)	Shaft	No	No	No	No	Yes		
2005	Pani Poni Dash!	Akiyuki Shinbo; Shin Oonuma (series)	Shaft	Yes	No	No	No	Yes		
2005	Sugar Sugar Rune	Yukihiro Matsushita	Pierrot	Yes	Yes	No	No	No		
2005	He Is My Master	Shouji Saeki	Gainax; Shaft	Yes	Yes	Yes	Yes	Yes		
2007	Prism Ark	Masami Ōbari	Frontline	No	No	No	No	Yes		
2007	Gurren Lagann	Hiroyuki Imaishi	Gainax	Yes	Yes	No	Yes	Yes	2nd key animator Opening director Ending director	
2007	Hidamari Sketch	Akiyuki Shinbo (chief); Ryouki Kamitsubo (chief)	Shaft	Yes	No	No	No	No		
2008	(Zoku) Sayonara, Zetsubou-Sensei	Akiyuki Shinbo; Yukihiro Miyamoto (chief episode)	Shaft	Yes	Yes	No	No	Yes		
2008	Psychic Squad	Keiichiro Kawaguchi	SynergySP	No	No	No	No	No	2nd key animator	
2008	Strike Witches	Kazuhiro Takamura	Gonzo	Yes	Yes	No	Yes	No		
2008	Michiko & Hatchin	Sayo Yamamoto	Manglobe	No	No	No	No	Yes		
2008	Corpse Princess: Aka	Masahiko Murata	Gainax feel.	Yes	Yes	No	No	Yes	Opening director	
2009	Mahoromatic: I'm Home, Special	Shouji Saeki	Gainax	Yes	No	No	No	Yes		
2009	Corpse Princess: Kuro	Masahiko Murata	Gainax feel.	No	No	No	No	Yes		
2010	Hanamaru Kindergarten	Seiji Mizushima	Gainax	Yes	Yes	No	Yes	No		
2011	The Mystic Archives of Dantalian	Yutaka Uemura	Gainax	Yes	No	No	No	No		
2012	Medaka Box	Shouji Saeki	Gainax	Yes	Yes	Yes	Yes	No	Opening director and storyboard	
2012	Medaka Box Abnormal	Shouji Saeki	Gainax	Yes	Yes	Yes	Yes	No		
2015	Wish Upon the Pleiades	Shouji Saeki	Gainax	Yes	Yes	No	Yes	No		
2017	March Comes In like a Lion 2nd Season	Akiyuki Shinbo; Kenjirou Okada (series)	Shaft	Yes	No	No	No	No		
2018	Fate/Extra: Last Encore	Akiyuki Shinbo (chief); Yukihiro Miyamoto (series)	Shaft	Yes	No	No	No	No		
2018	Forest of Piano	Gaku Nakatani; Ryūtarō Suzuki (series)	Gaina	Yes	No	No	No	No		
2018	Revue Starlight	Tomohiro Furukawa	Kinema Citrus	Yes	No	No	No	No		
2020	Assault Lily Bouquet	Shouji Saeki; Hajime Ootani (chief episode)	Shaft	Yes	Yes	Yes	Yes	Yes		
2022	Luminous Witches	Shouji Saeki	Shaft	Yes	Yes	Yes	Yes	No	Opening storyboard	
2025	A Ninja and an Assassin Under One Roof	Yukihiro Miyamoto	Shaft	No	No	No	No	No	Opening director and storyboard	
2025	Apocalypse Hotel	Kana Shundou	Cygames Pictures	Yes	No	No	No	No		

=== OVAs/ONAs ===
Year	Title	Director(s)	Studio	SB	ED	Script	KA	Other roles and notes	Ref(s)
1997	Agent Aika	Katsuhiko Nishijima	Studio Fantasia	No	No	No	No	In-between animator	
2000	FLCL	Kazuya Tsurumaki	Gainax; Production I.G	Yes	Yes	No	Yes	In-between animator	
2011	Wish Upon the Pleiades	Shouji Saeki	Gainax	Yes	Yes	Yes	No		
2015	Omoi no Kakera	Shouji Saeki	Gainax	Yes	Yes	Yes	No		
2020	Luminous Witches (PV)	Shouji Saeki	Shaft	No	No	Yes	No		
2021	Assault Lily Fruits	Shouji Saeki	Shaft	Yes	No	No	No		

=== Films ===
Year	Title	Director(s)	Studio	Other roles and notes	Ref(s)
1997	Neon Genesis Evangelion: Death & Rebirth	Hideaki Anno (chief); Masayuki; Kazuya Tsurumaki	Gainax; Tatsunoko (#1); Production I.G (#2)	In-between animator	
1997	The End of Evangelion	Hideaki Anno (chief); Kazuya Tsurukami	Gainax; Production I.G	In-between animator	
2006	Gunbuster vs. Diebuster	Kazuya Tsurumaki	Gainax	2nd key animator	

== Notes ==
=== Works cited ===
- Suzuki, Akito; Harada, Nobukatsu; Kirikata, Runta (2004). この醜くも美しい世界公式ビジュアルブック [This Ugly Yet Beautiful World Official Visual Book] (in Japanese). Media Works. ISBN 978-4840229050.
