= Shaft (company) =

Japanese animation studio

Shaft Inc.
- Logo used since 2017

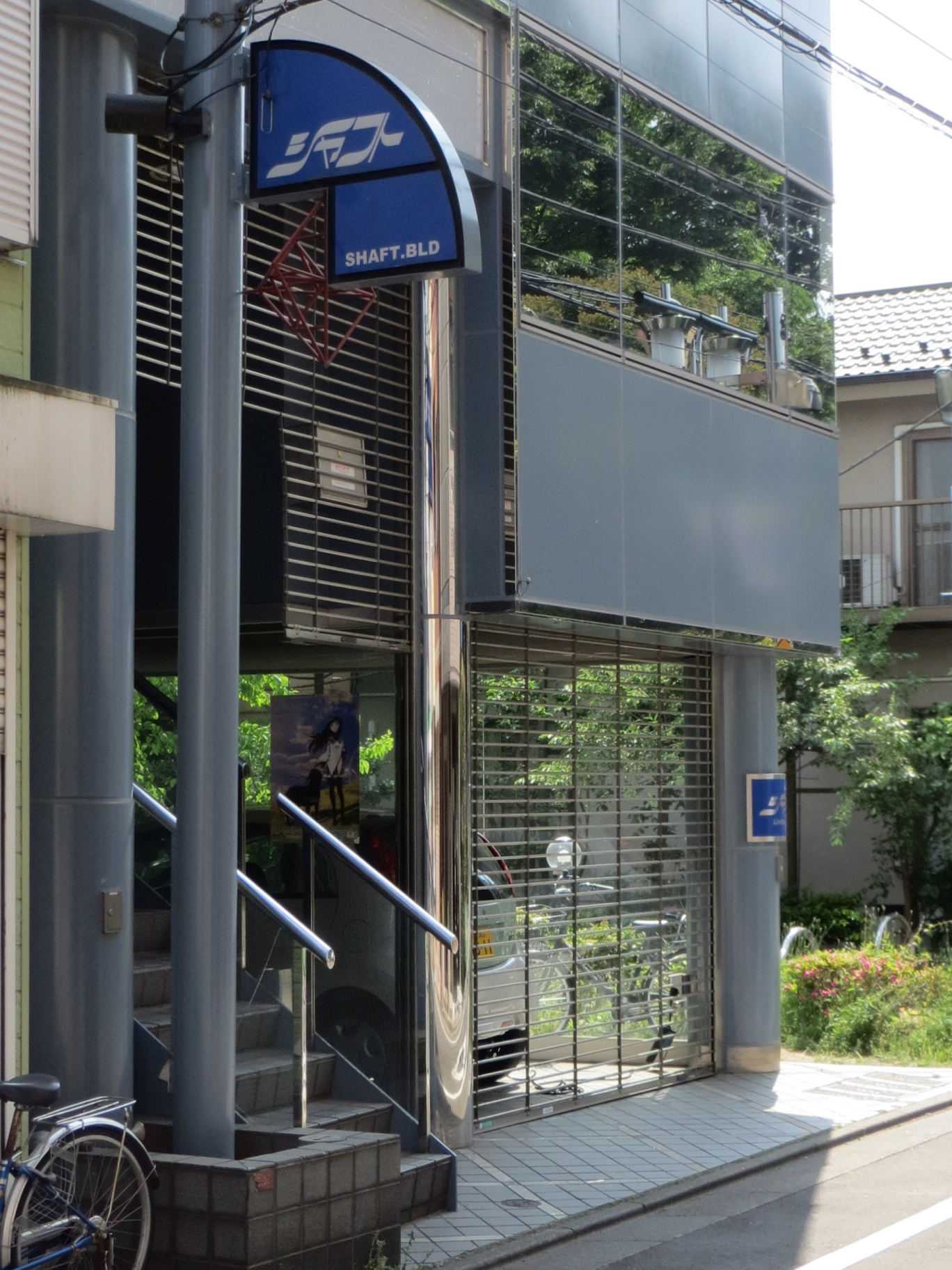
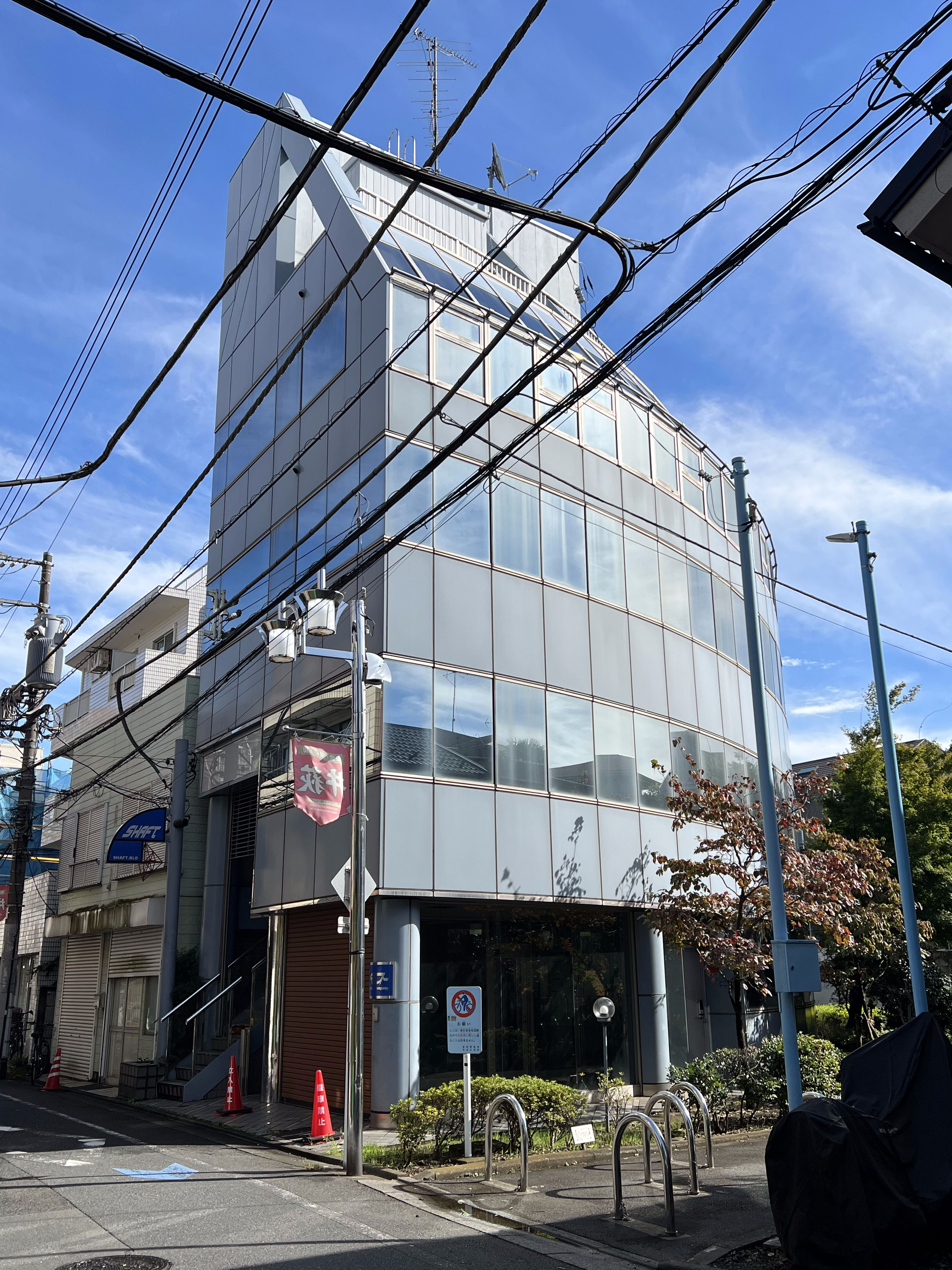
- Headquarters in Suginami, Tokyo
- Native name: 株式会社シャフト
- Romanized name: Kabushiki gaisha Shafuto
- Industry: Japanese animation
- Founded: September 1, 1975; 51 years ago
- Founder: Hiroshi Wakao
- Headquarters: Kamiigusa, Suginami, Tokyo (Note: Both headquarters and studio), Japan
- Key people: Hiroshi Wakao (chairman); Mitsutoshi Kubota (CEO)
- Total equity: ¥ 10,000,000
- Number of employees: 120; 170 (including contractors)
- Divisions: Former: Niigata (Note: An animation substudio located in Niigata, which is only known to have ever been credited for one episode of a series in 1989.); Current: Digital@Shaft (Note: Photography, painting, and visual effects division established in 2004. Around 2020, the CG group within Digital@Shaft split, with some staying as part of the Digital@Shaft team and others establishing a new department. In 2021, the division formed a background art team, which also separated into its own department later that year.); Shaft Ten (Note: Shaft Ten, the licensing division and online shop operated by the studio, founded in 2017.); CGI Animation Room (Note: Shaft CGI Animation Room (シャフトCGI Animation Room), a CGI division established circa 2020, and spun-off of Digital@Shaft.); Art Section (Note: Shaft Art Section, a background art division separated from Digital@Shaft in 2021.); Shaft Aoi (Note: Shaft Shizuoka Studio Aoi, a substudio located in Shizuoka founded in 2022.)
- Website: www.shaft-web.co.jp

Shaft Inc. (stylized as SHAFT; Japanese: 株式会社シャフト, Hepburn: Kabushiki-gaisha Shafuto), also known as Shaft Animation Studio, is a Japanese animation studio founded in 1975 and headquartered in Suginami, Tokyo. Since 2004, the studio's productions and staff have been broadly influenced by director Akiyuki Shinbo, whose visual style and avant-garde cinematography are featured in works including Hidamari Sketch (2007), Sayonara, Zetsubou-Sensei (2007), the Monogatari series (2009–present), Puella Magi Madoka Magica (2011), Nisekoi (2014), and March Comes In like a Lion (2016).

== History ==
=== 1975–1984: Early sub-contracting work ===
Shaft was founded as a yūgen-gaisha on September 1, 1975, by ex-Mushi Production employee Hiroshi Wakao. Much of the company's early work was sub-contracting work for larger animation studios, which includes credits to cel painting and color coordination work, such as with Brave Raideen (1975–76), and occasionally credits as an assistant production studio for projects including Pierrot's Urusei Yatsura: Only You (1983). A large portion of the company's early painting work was contracted under Sunrise productions.

=== 1984–2004: Move to animation production ===
In 1984, Shaft was sub-contracted by studio Zuiyo to animate the Elves of the Forest television series, marking the company's first project as a primary animation studio. (Note: Note: While Shaft is credited for "Production assistance", Zuiyo itself (in 1984) did not have its own animation department, so Shaft is the studio that was outsourced to for main animation work.) Not until 1987, however, with the release of the Yume kara, Samenai original video animation (OVA), did the studio release its first wholly-original production. In the same year, the studio produced the first episode of the Taiman Blues: Naoto Shimizu-hen OVA series.

For the next several years, the company returned to sub-contracting work based on animation production services rather than its painting services, such as with the Mushi Production film Ushiro no Shoumen Daare (1991). In 1995, the studio moved to producing full-length series, starting with Juuni Senshi Bakuretsu Eto Ranger. By this time, several directors and animators had joined the studio, such as Toshimasa Suzuki and Kenji Yasuda; however, one of the most important series in the company's early history was an outsourcing contract they took on in 1996: Legend of Crystania: The Chaos Ring, which began the studio's relationship with director Ryūtarō Nakamura and studio Triangle Staff. The second episode of the OVA series was outsourced to Shaft, and both Nakamura and Triangle Staff's president (Yoshimi Asari) visited Shaft while delivering the episode's storyboard. Mitsutoshi Kubota, a studio color designer turned production manager at the time, met with the two, and from then they would collaborate on several more projects together, such as Shaft producing an episode of Nakamura and Triangle Staff's Kino's Journey television series, and Nakamura later directing a television series and Kino's Journey film at the studio.

In 1998, Radix produced a 26-episode adaptation of Kia Asamiya's manga Silent Möbius; and although produced as a Radix production, Shaft was contracted as an outsourcing company for the entire series, and according to Kubota served as the production site for the series (rather than Radix). Shaft was also responsible for selecting the staff, and chief director Hideki Tonokatsu worked from the studio. Nobuyuki Takeuchi left Studio Giants in the early 90s, and Shaft offered him a seat at the studio as a freelancing animator; and for Silent Möbius, he took on the role of "animation director" (not referring to the correction of drawings). Kubota felt that Takeuchi would eventually play a central role in Shaft's works succeeding the series, and he eventually became an integral part of many of the productions made with Shinbo.

Shaft entered co-operations with studios Gainax and TNK around 2000. The first of the productions under these co-operations was Mahoromatic (2001) and its sequel Mahoromatic: Something More Beautiful (2002–03), both with Gainax and under the direction of Hiroyuki Yamaga. 2002 was also the release of the studio's production with TNK, G-On Riders. In 2003 and 2004, the studio produced an adaptation of the visual novel Popotan, and later This Ugly yet Beautiful World, an original series co-produced with Gainax and director Shouji Saeki. The development of This Ugly yet Beautiful World began when members of Mahoromatic said that they wanted to do another work with the team, which included both the voice actors and staff members. While searching for scriptwriting and directing staff to work on the project, Saeki and Gainax producer Hiroki Satou mentioned that it would involve much of the Mahoromatic staff to those they invited, such as director Shin Itagaki and writer Sumio Uetake.

=== 2004–2016: Kubota and Team Shinbo era ===
In 2004, Wakao was succeeded as Shaft's representative director by Kubota, though he remained a chairman on the studio's board. After watching The SoulTaker (2001) and Le Portrait de Petit Cossette (2004), both works directed by Akiyuki Shinbo, Kubota decided that he wanted to work with Shinbo to create a uniquely identifiable brand for the studio. In October 2004, the studio animated its first production with Shinbo as director, Tsukuyomi: Moon Phase, and he began serving as an executive director and mentor to the studio's staff.

Shaft's final co-production with Gainax came in 2005 with He Is My Master. The same year saw the first animated production under the influence of "Team Shinbo", a director trio consisting of Shinbo, Shin Oonuma, and Tatsuya Oishi, who played a vital role in the studio's early stylistic decisions. Shinbo had invited both Oonuma and Oishi to direct episodes under him having seen their work under him on previous projects outside of Shaft. The next two years also saw the release of Rec (2006) and Kino's Journey: Country of Illness -For You- (2007), the aforementioned series directed by Ryūtarō Nakamura, which would be the last series produced by Shaft not to feature any involvement by Shinbo for more than a decade.

During the mid-to-late 2000s, the studio brought on a number of new directors and creators, including Ryouki Kamitsubo, Naoyuki Tatsuwa, Kenichi Ishikura, Yukihiro Miyamoto, Shinichi Omata, Tomoyuki Itamura, and Gekidan Inu Curry. Kamitsubo and Oonuma, however, left by the end of the decade, with the latter joining Silver Link where he established himself in a similar role to Shinbo's.

In 2009, Shinbo and Oishi directed Bakemonogatari, which was later characterized as a hallmark of the studio's unique aesthetics. It gained a cult-like following among fans in both Japan and the West for its narrative and "visually striking" animation and artistic qualities. Polygon named it as the series that "pushed studio Shaft into the spotlight", and the series was chosen as the "best anime series of 2009" by the Tokyo Anime Award Festival in 2017. Following Bakemonogatari, the studio produced yet another critical and financial hit two years later with Puella Magi Madoka Magica. Madoka Magica is regarded by several publications and critics as one of the greatest anime productions of all time, and the series' financial and critical success spawned a franchise consisting of several films, television series, and games produced in part or in whole by Shaft. Along with the Monogatari series, Madoka Magica is considered to be one of the most financially successful anime products in Japan, with both series maintaining the highest average sales of DVDs, Blu-Rays, and re-releases in Japan. In 2012, the studio returned to animating the Monogatari series with Nisemonogatari, albeit with director Tomoyuki Itamura in place of Oishi. Itamura and Shinbo produced a subsequent Monogatari season every year up until Zoku Owarimonogatari (2018), which is the only Monogatari season to feature Shinbo as the sole director.

English logo used from 2010–2017

The early-to-mid 2010s brought more changes to the studio's creative staff and the studio itself. For one, 2015 was the year Shaft reorganized from a yūgen-gaisha to a kabushiki-gaisha. Several directors also ended up leaving around this time, such as Kenichi Ishikura after serving as assistant director on Mahō Sensei Negima! Anime Final in 2011, Shinichi Omata around 2012, and Naoyuki Tatsuwa after he directed Gourmet Girl Graffiti in 2015. A number of other notable directors were brought into the studio around this time, however, such as directors Yuki Yase, Kenjirou Okada, Hajime Ootani, and Midori Yoshizawa. Tatsuya Oishi disappeared from the public spotlight in the early 2010s after he began production on the Kizumonogatari film trilogy, which was released in 2016 and 2017. Shaft's animation work on the trilogy has been praised as being uniquely experimental with 2D and CG effects, which some reviewers described as not always mixing well, but has nonetheless been called "gorgeous."

In the late 2010s, a number of other creative staff left the studio. Yuki Yase left after directing The Beheading Cycle: The Blue Savant and the Nonsense Bearer (2016–17), and moved with animation producer Kousuke Matsunaga to David Production where he directed the first season of Fire Force (2019). CG director Shinya Takano and at-the-time production assistants Reo Honjouya, Shou Sugawara, and Kenichirou Yano also transferred to David Production with Matsunaga; though, Yase has continued to contribute as a storyboard artist to Shaft works into the 2020s. Tomoyuki Itamura, who directed the rest of the Monogatari series after Oishi's commitment to Kizumonogatari, left the studio after the production of Owarimonogatari II (2017) and took Izumi Takizawa, a color designer with the studio since the late 90s, with him.

=== 2016–present: Post-Team Shinbo ===
In 2016 and 2017, directors Kenjirou Okada and Nobuyuki Takeuchi directed their debuts as series/film directors with March Comes In like a Lion (2016–18) and Fireworks (2017), and the studio produced Fate/Extra Last Encore with Miyamoto as series directing in 2018. The film version of Zoku Owarimonogatari was also released in 2018, solely directed by Shinbo; and its televised version was the studio's only official major production in 2019. The studio was, however, outsourced to for an episode of Tezuka Productions' adaptation of The Quintessential Quintuplets (2019). The entirety of the episode was produced at Shaft, with Midori Yoshizawa as episode director and a majority of the Shaft production team working on the episode, including the studio's colorists, animators, and photographers (the episode is also the only episode to feature a separate photography director, that being Shaft's Rei Egami). One version of the story that led to Shaft's involvement with the work was that TBS producer Junichirou Tanaka met CEO Kubota at a dinner party once and had asked on his knees for Shaft's help in producing the first half of the series' 11th episode, but during conversation Kubota noted that he knew of the issues with the production and decided that Shaft would be capable of producing the entire episode. Alternatively, in another interview, Tanaka said that Tezuka Productions hadn't received enough time to produce the series, so he tried phoning a number of production companies and eventually landed on Shaft (who animated Hidamari Sketch, another TBS-produced anime) and Kubota accepted the offer to contribute key animation only for the A-part (first half) of the episode. Later, Tanaka asked Kubota if Shaft could produce the entire episode, and since the two companies had history, and Kubota was on friendly terms with producer Hiroshi Oosawa form Tezuka Productions, Shaft eventually agreed to produce the entire episode. Series director Satoshi Kuwabara drew the episode's storyboards but left the production of the episode entirely up to Yoshizawa and Shaft.

In 2020, Shaft returned to producing full-length series with Magia Record: Puella Magi Madoka Magica Side Story, an adaptation of a spin-off mobile game series based on the studio's Madoka Magica franchise. It was the first series since 2007 not to be directed in part by Akiyuki Shinbo (although he served as an animation supervisor), and was instead chief directed by Doroinu of Gekidan Inu Curry, one of the original series' alternate space designers. Shaft's second and final project of the year, Assault Lily Bouquet, was also the first time since 2007 that Shinbo had not been involved with one of the studio's main projects entirely. Bouquet was instead directed by former Gainax member Shouji Saeki and Shaft member Hajime Ootani.

Shinbo returned to the director's chair in 2021 with his adaptation of Pretty Boy Detective Club, which he co-directed alongside Ootani. The series served as the debut for Shaft's CGI animation division, as well as the Umegumi division. The second season of Magia record: Puella Magi Madoka Magica Side Story later that year also debuted the company's background art division, albeit listed under Digital@Shaft, before being given their own department name in the third season of the series in early 2022. The company opened a branch studio in Shizuoka (which is also the first animation studio in Shizuoka Prefecture), with a few of the staff members from the head office moving to the city in order to establish operations and train new staff. Veteran color designer Yasuko Watanabe, who joined the company in 2000, became the branch studio's chief. In 2021, a fourth Madoka Magica film titled Walpurgisnacht: Rising was announced to be in production.

At the end of 2021, and following into 2022, the studio produced a short series based on the Assault Lily franchise entitled Assault Lily Fruits; and in March of that year, completed the Magia Record series with a four-episode finale. In July of that year, the studio produced Luminous Witches and RWBY: Ice Queendom jointly. In 2023, a special based on The Quintessential Quintuplets was announced to be produced at the studio. Prior to the release of the 2022 film, the show's producers had no intention of making another anime based on the project; however, they changed their minds upon seeing the positive reception towards the film. The reason to produce the new project at Shaft was mainly due to the popularity of the first season's 11th episode, which Shaft produced as a gross outsource.

2023 saw no new releases from the studio aside from the Quintuplets special. However, while the studio did not produce its own works, it was busy assisting other companies with theirs. Of those, the most notable collaboration happened between Shaft and Bug Films. The studio was producing its first series, Zom 100: Bucket List of the Dead, and Shaft was asked to assist with part of the production of the series at the start of the third episode (and ending with the fifth episode), according to Bug Films CEO Hiroaki Kojima.

Noticeably, Shinbo's involvement at the studio lessened following the turn of the decade. Whereas he had previously been involved in every major production since 2004 (with the exception of their co-productions with Gainax and the two works directed by Ryūtarō Nakamura), various other affiliated directors began to take up the mantle—most notably Miyamoto and Saeki. Animator Kazuya Shiotsuki, who joined just before Shinbo was invited to Shaft, noted that many of the staff from that time period became the "Children of Shinbo" (新房チルドレン) in that his influence extended further than just to the directors, and that the team as a whole (including animators such as himself) were broadly influenced by the values he displayed. With the new generation of staff members joining in the early 2020s, as Shinbo had decreased his overall output, many of the staff at the studio were instead being influenced by Saeki and, according to Shiotsuki, Yasuomi Umetsu, who has been working on a project at the studio for several years.

In early 2024, a new adaptation of the Monogatari series, specifically the Off and Monster Season series of novels, was announced with much of the series core staff returning and a July release date. Pre-production of the series started in fall of 2022 following the end of Luminous Witches and RWBY: Ice Queendom when Aniplex producer Tatsuya Ishikawa approached the studio about continuing the adaptation. Agreeing, studio president Kubota selected Midori Yoshizawa, who had been directing at Shaft for nearly a decade by that point, as the new series director under Shinbo. The series was released as an original net animation as opposed to a standard television series, much like Koyomimonogatari in 2016. Having only directed individual OVAs without Shinbo's supervision, Miyamoto made his solo-directing debut in 2025 with the release of A Ninja and an Assassin Under One Roof.

That year, the studio also released the first installment in the Virgin Punk series co-created and directed by Umetsu. Umetsu's connection to Shaft existed through his decades-old friendship with Shinbo, which extended back to 1996. Shinbo asked Umetsu to direct openings and endings for Shaft projects in the 2000s at several points, but Umetsu's schedule was always busy. It wasn't until And Yet the Town Moves in 2010 that the two were able to collaborate, and it was this project that Umetsu first felt interested in working with Shaft. According to him, the studio's coloring and cinematographic strengths were appealing; however, while he had ideas for a project with the studio, he was in the midst of directing Galilei Donna (2013) and Wizard Barristers (2014) at two other studios, so he opted to wait to approach the company. When Wizard Barristers ended, Umetsu approached Kubota with three project ideas. Kubota approved of the one Umetsu had titled Vespa, later renamed Virgin Punk, and Kubota took the idea to Aniplex CEO Atsuhiro Iwakami, and the two companies greenlight the project. Pre-production began in 2015 when scriptwriter Yuuya Takahashi joined the project (and finished the script that year). Umetsu also directed the opening for Shinbo and Tatsuwa's Gourmet Girl Graffiti, which led to him meeting with production assistant Ryuusuke Suzuki, whom Umetsu selected to be the animation producer for Virgin Punk. Umetsu, technically still affiliated with studio Arms, continued to direct openings and endings at several other studios (including his home studio), and by 2017 he had a position at both Pierrot Plus (which had absorbed much of Arms' staff as its sister company) and Shaft. By 2018, however, he fully transferred to Shaft and the early animation work on Virgin Punk started.

== Style ==
=== Visual style ===
Directors Akiyuki Shinbo, Shin Oonuma, and Tatsuya Oishi, who formed "Team Shinbo", are essentially responsible for defining Shaft's production culture and experimental stylistic visuals in the mid-to-late 2000s. They each brought separate stylistic strengths that contributed to the eventual "Shaft style" the studio embraced, despite the fact that neither Oonuma nor Oishi had much prior experience as directors. Oonuma and Oishi's success with the studio is in part due to the "mentorship" system created at Shaft, which was centered around Shinbo. The two former directors would work under Shinbo and the Shaft system as episode directors and storyboard artists until they were promoted to series directors with Shinbo maintaining a supervising role over them. In turn, they, too, could begin mentoring other directors; in particular, Oonuma mentored Yukihiro Miyamoto, Tomoyuki Itamura, and Naoyuki Tatsuwa, and Oishi's influence has been exerted across the Shaft studio as a whole (and most likely Itamura, who took over the Monogatari series from Oishi). Team Shinbo, Miyamoto, and Itamura's styles within Shaft as a whole tend to be more experimental in nature, whereas Tatsuwa was the sole director who took a more grounded approach to the series he was involved with (while still maintaining Shaft's style).

Several techniques that the studio's directors still employ were popularized by Team Shinbo, such as the usage of ostentatious or simple backgrounds and tones, unique editing cuts, flat color contrasts, brief flashes of on-screen text and images, the insertion of real-world objects into the animated medium, monochromatic color schemes, minimalistic and abstract backgrounds, extreme changes in background art, and sharp color contrasts. Clothing patterns are sometimes shown as flat designs that ignore the shape and perspective of the character's body. These techniques are used to facilitate certain surrealistic narratives and imagery and consistently exist through each of the studio's productions. Miyamoto brought to the studio sharp color contrasts and changing color palettes, which Itamura was stylistically influenced by; Itamura himself also created his own style defined by the usage of "chapter breaks" and paper cutouts. Tatsuwa, in contrast to the others, maintained series with less visual surrealism, albeit he continued to use several of the stylistic elements from the other directors. One of the studio's most well-known stylistic insertions, the so-called head-tilt, has also been acknowledged by Shinbo as one of the studio's staples.

Miyamoto brought to Shaft the art troupe Gekidan Inu Curry in 2008 during (Zoku) Sayonara, Zetsubou-Sensei, and the duo's style greatly influenced the studio's animation style as a whole, which later defined the Madoka Magica franchise that Miyamoto and Shinbo directed two years later.

=== Narrative style ===
Shaft's work culture has also influenced the narrative writings of the studio's productions, which have been described as existing "somewhere between comedy and despair", which can be best seen through the works of director Miyamoto, who has headed some of the studio's most depressive series, and also their most comedic. The studio's works oftentimes also include unconventional characters and experimentation within the genre of the series the studio produces, while also diverging from the expectations of the audience.

=== In-house departments ===
Following Wakao's retirement in 2004, Kubota decided to restructure the studio's system itself. While the arrival of Shinbo, Oonuma, and Oishi was a part of this restructuring, Kubota also founded Shaft's in-house photography, painting, and visual effects division, which would move the already-existing painting team, in 2004. The division, named Digital@Shaft, made its first appearance on Gakuen Alice episode 4, which was outsourced to Shaft. The new department reorganized certain staff members in the studio and hired new recruits interested in the newly formed photography team, the latter of which includes current chiefs of the department Rei Egami and Takayuki Aizu. Shinichirou Etou, who had been working at the company for three years as a production assistant, was asked to set up the department due to his experience in CG from when he attended Japan Electronics College.

Shaft opened a licensing division in 2017 which manages an online shop –Shaft Ten– selling Blu-Rays, production materials, and other merchandise for series the company produces, as well as for managing the licenses of these goods and works. According to division manager Kouji Tanoue, president Kubota and himself intend to grow the division's business capabilities in order to support the studio's ventures and human resource needs.

In August 2020, Shaft posted a recruitment notice for 3DCG animation staff, and the Shaft CGI Animation Room (a division spun-off from Digital@Shaft) debuted in the studio's Pretty Boy Detective Club series the following year. Etou had left the company in 2017, but when he heard that the studio was creating a 3DCG department, he rejoined the studio and intends to make the department a pillar of Shaft productions within 5 to 10 years. Pretty Boy Detective Club also used the name Shaft Umegumi for its opening animation production credit, a humorous title given to director Yasuomi Umetsu and part of his team at the studio who produced the opening while working on their own project, the then-unannounced Virgin Punk.

In 2021, Digital@Shaft formed a background art team as well. Art director Hisaharu Iijima, a common collaborator of the studio's since 2007, and of Shinbo's since 2004, as well as the CEO and president of his own studio (Ryuubidou) was employed by the studio as a technical advisor for the art department.

=== Production methods ===
Beyond the in-house culture the studio emphasizes in its works, Shaft has also emphasized using a common workflow from project to project to ease the transition from production to production. The purpose of such commonality between productions is to allow for consistency and the continuity of Shaft's style between productions. While this system allows for Shaft's style to manifest throughout each of their productions, it also allows for more creative freedoms across all individuals working with the studio, such as Shinbo's philosophy of "mix[ing] participating staffer’s feelings". Madoka Magica screenwriter Gen Urobuchi described the work environment as giving him a level of freedom he'd never had before, and that "I did not think I could have written this screenplay in any other place", and both original character designer Ume Aoki and alternate space designers Gekidan Inu Curry have expressed similar perspectives. Although anime is a collaborative process, the signature style of Shaft can best be attributed to the whole of the studio and its members rather than a single individual, and the artistic freedoms across the entire production line allow for the convergence of different staff members and their ideas to freely explore the medium which they work in. Director Midori Yoshizawa mentioned that during the production of Magia Record, the directors consulted with the animators in the company and expressed the idea that the animators themselves could change the storyboards for action scenes if they could come up with better ideas, and Yoshizawa said that this was because the animators would be able to come up with better fights and effects overall. Character designer and chief animation director Junichirou Taniguchi (from Doga Kobo) also said that he believed it was fine for the characters to appear more stylized (and off-model) during action scenes.

Visual effects chief Hisato Shima stated that other studios commonly have animators and operators specializing in 3D (or certain aspects of the 3D process), but that Shaft artists tend to work in a more broad area and perform several tasks during anime production. Shaft's production pipeline often utilizes materials created during the normal production pipine (that is: layouts, key animation, in-between animation, finishing (painting/coloring), photography, editing) that work as temporary reference points for both 2D and 3D animators, and assist with camera angles, reference points, and other processes. Later in the production, these temporary materials are removed, and the final CG work is added. In order to counteract the issues that come with productions that have a mix of traditional/CG animation in regards to paper and digital canvas sizes, the studio developed a format that would be convenient for both processes by standardizing a 2156 x 1526 pixel screen size for the 3D artists. According to Kenjirou Okada, most studios would process things like tableware through 2D animation; but at Shaft, to guarantee a certain quality as opposed to sometimes distorted shapes, such materials are normally processed with CG instead.

Although the Madoka Magica film trilogy was not Shaft's first work to be released in theaters, it's potentially their first work to be made in a "theatrical production." Animation producer Yasuhiro Okada said that in making the film trilogy, he was conscious of the fact that he had never been involved with a theatrical production and received advice from various people; however, he noted the uniqueness of Shaft's methods in production "Shaft animation", and found that the advice was not useful for Shaft works. For this reason, Okada set up the schedule so that the film was split into five units (A through E), and each one would be worked on in order rather than different parts moving forward at different times. This allowed for the work to prioritize a small, "elite" group of animators not just for the fact that it was a theatrical work, but so that director Yukihiro Miyamoto would ideally be able to see all of their cuts and supervise the work more closely.

Since the time Shinbo joined the studio, Shaft-produced series also had more cuts than the average anime series, as well as more corrections and retakes in Blu-ray and DVD releases than standard. According to Shinbo, the first storyboard drawn for the studio and his newfound collaboration, Tsukuyomi: Moon Phase episode 1, was 308 cuts. The standard anime is somewhere between 300-400 cuts; however, as he continued to work for Shaft, the number of cuts in their anime continued to increase. By the time of Hidamari Sketch, episodes generally were 400-500 cuts per episode, with other series like Monogatari and And Yet the Town Moves having an equivalent number. Considering the time and budget series like Hidamari Sketch had, Shinbo mentioned that he doesn't think any other studio would allow as many cuts and as many corrections to the home video release versions as Shaft.

According to both Kubota and Shinbo, Shaft's productions as a whole also desire the involvement of the original authors or creators of the source material which they adapt in their productions. Kubota has also emphasized a particular focus on putting full studio effort into each of their works, and not increasing the number of productions purely to satiate demand.

The uniqueness of Shaft's production system compared to other anime studios, with several directors and specialized roles per most series, has also introduced certain problems. Monogatari series character designer Akio Watanabe stated that Shaft's production system during the time of Bakemonogatari (2009) was "bad at the time." Although Watanabe did not specify in what way, he mentioned that the series' pre-production could be difficult due to designs and finalizations needing to be checked by visual director Nobuyuki Takeuchi, series director Tatsuya Oishi, and director Shinbo (as opposed to one director's check).

=== Directors ===
One of the core elements that represented Shaft as a unique studio among its peers came with Shinbo at the head of Shaft's directing department. Though Shaft had developed a relationship with other directors in the past like Kunitoshi Okajima and in-house talents fostered under him like Toshimasa Suzuki, Shinbo's position initiated a wave of new directors both joining and being trained by himself and, especially, Oonuma and Oishi. Although Suzuki left the company prior to Shinbo joining, he would still act as the assistant director for the studio and director's first project together, Tsukuyomi: Moon Phase; and Suzuki later remarked that Shinbo was the catalyst for Shaft's identity as a "directing company" (演出の会社). Almost all works produced by Shaft for the next 14 years involved Shinbo as either "director" or "chief director" with a "series director", "assistant director", "chief director", or "chief episode director" in active positions beneath him. Works produced after Shinbo's reign as chief director continued to use this system. The various credits actively participated in various parts of pre-production, production, and post-production.

Shaft's director credits:

- Chief Director (総監督) - Generally used for works in which Shinbo and another director are involved from the start, and which Shinbo often gives more freedoms to the directors to. Shinbo's role as "chief director" ranges from little-to-no active participation like in Katteni Kaizō, to active creative decisions in pre-production like scenario checks, storyboard checks and revisions, design supervision, and overall direction like in Tsukuyomi: Moon Phase, Monogatari series and Pretty Boy Detective Club.
- Director (監督) - The standard "director" credit used in most of the industry.
- Series Director (シリーズディレクター) - The "series director" is generally given to directors who join a production partway through pre-production or a similar circumstance and are involved as a director generally following Shinbo's orders. Tatsuya Oishi joined Bakemonogatari after the 5th episode's storyboard orders were completed, Yuki Yase joined Hidamari Sketch x Honeycomb after the 8th episode's storyboards were completed, and Yukihiro Miyamoto joined Puella Magi Madoka Magica a few months before the series began to air (thus in production itself). Oishi, Yase, and Miyamoto subsequently received director (監督) credits for their respective sequel works as they were a part of the projects from the start with Shinbo taking on the chief director (総監督) credit. Miyamoto later clarified that there was no difference between his role in the Madoka TV series and films despite the credit differences, and seemingly only the amount of time he had been involved with had changed.
- Chief Director (チーフディレクター) - Despite the name, the credit has been used generally to refer to "assistant" or "series" directors. Hidamari Sketch "chief director" Ryouki Kamitsubo referred to himself as the "assistant" for the series; and Suzuki referred to Kenjirou Okada, who was given a "chief director" credit, as the "series director" in an interview.
- Director's Assistant (監督補佐) - Used once for Suzuki on Tsukuyomi: Moon Phase.
- Assistant Director (副監督) - Despite the name, "assistant directors" at Shaft act similar to "series directors" or are like junior "directors." Naoyuki Tatsuwa, for example, was referred to as the "series director" for And Yet the Town Moves by Shinbo despite his official credit being "assistant director."
- Chief Episode Director (チーフ演出) - A credit usually describing a director closely involved in the production process of all episodes. Used only a few times at Shaft, Miyamoto described his role on the sequel Sayonara, Zetsubou-Sensei seasons as being like a "handyman" and doing a little bit of direction for all episodes, the openings and ending, as well as attending dubbing sessions and art meetings when assistant director Tatsuwa was unable to.
- Director (ディレクター) - Used only in Magia Record season 1 to refer to directors given "series director" responsibility over select episodes.

== Productions ==
=== Anime television series ===
Year	Title	Director(s) (Note: For Chief Director (総監督), Director (監督) and Director's Assistant (監督補佐) credits.)	Series director(s) (Note: For Series Director (シリーズディレクター), Chief Director (チーフディレクター), Assistant Director (副監督), Chief Episode Director (チーフ演出), and Director (ディレクター) credits.)	Animation producer(s)	Source	Eps.	Refs.
1995–1996	Juuni Senshi Bakuretsu Eto Ranger	Kunitoshi Okajima	—N/a	Producer: Hiroshi Wakao	Original work	39	
2000–2001	Dotto! Koni-chan	Shinichi Watanabe (#1–13); Kenji Yasuda (#14–26)	Shintarou Inokawa (assistant, #1–13)	Producer: Mitsutoshi Kubota	Original work	26	
2001	Mahoromatic: Automatic Maiden (co-animated with Gainax)	Hiroyuki Yamaga	—N/a	Producers: Mitsutoshi Kubota; Hiroki Katou	Manga	12 (Note: A summary episode of Mahoromatic: Automatic Maiden aired on December 15, 2001.)	
2002	G-On Riders (co-animated with TNK)	Shinichiro Kimura	—N/a		Original work	13 (Note: An original video animation episode of G-On Riders was released on March 28, 2003.)	
2002–2003	Mahoromatic: Something More Beautiful (co-animated with Gainax)	Hiroyuki Yamaga	Shouji Saeki (assistant)	Producer: Mitsutoshi Kubota; Hiroki Katou	Manga	14	
2003	Popotan	Shinichiro Kimura	—N/a	Producer: Mitsutoshi Kubota	Eroge visual novel	12	
2004	This Ugly yet Beautiful World (co-animated with Gainax)	Shouji Saeki	—N/a	Mitsutoshi Kubota	Original work	12	
2004–2005	Tsukuyomi: Moon Phase	Akiyuki Shinbo (chief); Toshimasa Suzuki (assistant)	—N/a	Mitsutoshi Kubota	Manga	25	
2005	He Is My Master (co-animated with Gainax)	Shouji Saeki	—N/a	Mitsutoshi Kubota	Manga	12	
2005	Pani Poni Dash!	Akiyuki Shinbo	Shin Oonuma	Mitsutoshi Kubota	Manga	26	
2006	Rec	Ryūtarō Nakamura	—N/a	Producer: Mitsutoshi Kubota	Manga	9 (Note: An original video animation episode of Rec was released on June 30, 2006.)	
2006–2007	Negima!?	Akiyuki Shinbo	Shin Oonuma (chief)	Mitsutoshi Kubota	Manga	26	
2007	Hidamari Sketch	Akiyuki Shinbo (chief)	Ryouki Kamitsubo (chief)		Manga	12 (Note: Two special episodes of Hidamari Sketch aired on October 19, 2007.)	
2007	Sayonara, Zetsubou-Sensei	Akiyuki Shinbo	Naoyuki Tatsuwa (assistant)	Mitsutoshi Kubota	Manga	12	
2007	Ef: A Tale of Memories	Shin Oonuma	—N/a	Shigeyuki Amemiya	Visual novel	12	
2008	(Zoku) Sayonara, Zetsubou-Sensei	Akiyuki Shinbo	Naoyuki Tatsuwa (assistant); Yukihiro Miyamoto (chief episode)	Mitsutoshi Kubota	Manga	13	
2008	Hidamari Sketch × 365	Akiyuki Shinbo	—N/a		Manga	13 (Note: Two special episodes of Hidamari Sketch × 365 aired on October 18, 2009 and October 25, 2009, respectively.)	
2008	Ef: A Tale of Melodies	Shin Oonuma	—N/a	Shigeyuki Amemiya	Visual novel	12	
2009	Maria Holic	Akiyuki Shinbo	Yukihiro Miyamoto; Naoyuki Tatsuwa (assistant)	Mitsutoshi Kubota	Manga	12	
2009	Natsu no Arashi!	Akiyuki Shinbo	Shin Oonuma	Mitsutoshi Kubota	Manga	13	
2009	Bakemonogatari	Akiyuki Shinbo	Tatsuya Oishi	Producer: Mitsutoshi Kubota	Light novel	15 (Note: TV: July 3, 2009 – September 25, 2009 (12 episodes). ONA: November 3, 2009 – June 25, 2010 (3 episodes).)	
2009	(Zan) Sayonara, Zetsubou-Sensei	Akiyuki Shinbo	Naoyuki Tatsuwa (assistant); Yukihiro Miyamoto (chief episode)	Mitsutoshi Kubota	Manga	13	
2009	Natsu no Arashi! Akinai-chū	Akiyuki Shinbo	Shin Oonuma (#1–7); Kenichi Ishikura (#8–13)	Mitsutoshi Kubota	Manga	13	
2010	Dance in the Vampire Bund	Akiyuki Shinbo	Masahiro Sonoda	Mitsutoshi Kubota; Line producer: Takeshi Baba	Manga	12	
2010	Hidamari Sketch × Hoshimittsu	Akiyuki Shinbo	Kenichi Ishikura		Manga	12 (Note: Two special episodes of Hidamari Sketch × Hoshimittsu aired on October 24, 2010 and October 31, 2010, respectively.)	
2010	Arakawa Under the Bridge	Akiyuki Shinbo	Yukihiro Miyamoto	Mitsutoshi Kubota; Line producers: Tadao Iwaki; Makoto Kohara	Manga	13	
2010	Arakawa Under the Bridge x Bridge	Akiyuki Shinbo	Yukihiro Miyamoto	Mitsutoshi Kubota; Line producer: Tadao Iwaki	Manga	13	
2010	And Yet the Town Moves	Akiyuki Shinbo (chief)	Naoyuki Tatsuwa (assistant)	Producer: Mitsutoshi Kubota	Manga	12	
2011	Puella Magi Madoka Magica	Akiyuki Shinbo	Yukihiro Miyamoto	Tadao Iwaki	Original work	12	
2011	Maria Holic Alive	Akiyuki Shinbo (chief)	Tomokazu Tokoro; Kenichi Ishikura (assistant)	Mitsutoshi Kubota; Yuuji Kanno	Manga	12	
2011	Ground Control to Psychoelectric Girl	Akiyuki Shinbo (chief)	Yukihiro Miyamoto	Mitsutoshi Kubota	Light novel	12	
2011	Hidamari Sketch × SP	Akiyuki Shinbo	—N/a		Manga	2	
2012	Nisemonogatari	Akiyuki Shinbo	Tomoyuki Itamura	Producer: Mitsutoshi Kubota	Light novel	11	
2012	Hidamari Sketch × Honeycomb	Akiyuki Shinbo	Yuki Yase		Manga	12	
2012	Nekomonogatari (Black)	Akiyuki Shinbo (chief); Tomoyuki Itamura	—N/a	Producer: Mitsutoshi Kubota	Manga	4	
2013	Sasami-san@Ganbaranai	Akiyuki Shinbo	Naoyuki Tatsuwa (assistant)	Kousuke Matsunaga	Manga	12	
2013	Monogatari Series: Second Season	Akiyuki Shinbo (chief); Tomoyuki Itamura	Naoyuki Tatsuwa (#6–9); Yuki Yase (#14–17)	Kousuke Matsunaga; Takuo Yukinaga	Light novel	23 (Note: Nekomonogatari (White): July 7, 2013 – August 4, 2013 (5 episodes). Kabukimonogatari: August 18, 2013 – September 8, 2013 (4 episodes). Otorimonogatari: September 22, 2013 – October 13, 2013 (4 episodes). Onimonogatari: October 27, 2013 – November 17, 2013 (4 episodes). Koimonogatari: November 24, 2013 – December 29, 2013 (6 episodes).)	
2014	Nisekoi	Akiyuki Shinbo (chief); Naoyuki Tatsuwa	—N/a	Hitoshi Fujikawa	Manga	20	
2014	Mekakucity Actors	Akiyuki Shinbo (chief); Yuki Yase	—N/a	Kousuke Matsunaga	Media-mix project	12	
2014	Hanamonogatari	Akiyuki Shinbo (chief); Tomoyuki Itamura	—N/a	Takuo Yukinaga	Light novel	5	
2014	Tsukimonogatari	Akiyuki Shinbo (chief); Tomoyuki Itamura	—N/a	Kazuki Soumiya	Light novel	4	
2015	Gourmet Girl Graffiti	Akiyuki Shinbo (chief); Naoyuki Tatsuwa	—N/a		Manga	12	
2015	Nisekoi:	Akiyuki Shinbo (chief)	Yukihiro Miyamoto (chief episode)	Kousuke Matsunaga	Manga	12	
2015	Owarimonogatari I	Akiyuki Shinbo (chief); Tomoyuki Itamura	—N/a	Kazuki Soumiya	Light novel	13	
2016–2017	March Comes In like a Lion	Akiyuki Shinbo	Kenjirou Okada	Kousuke Matsunaga	Manga	22	
2017	Owarimonogatari II	Akiyuki Shinbo (chief); Tomoyuki Itamura	—N/a	Kazuki Soumiya	Light novel	7	
2017–2018	March Comes In like a Lion 2nd Season	Akiyuki Shinbo	Kenjirou Okada	Kouichi Yasuda	Manga	22	
2018	Fate/Extra Last Encore	Akiyuki Shinbo (chief)	Yukihiro Miyamoto (chief episode)	Kazumasa Amitani	Video game	13	
2019	Zoku Owarimonogatari	Akiyuki Shinbo	—N/a	Producer: Kazuki Soumiya	Light novel	6	
2020	Magia Record: Puella Magi Madoka Magica Side Story	Doroinu (chief)	Yukihiro Miyamoto (assistant); Kenjirou Okada (director); Midori Yoshizawa (director)	Producer: Mitsutoshi Kubota	Mobile game	13	
2020	Assault Lily Bouquet	Shouji Saeki	Keita Nagahara (assistant); Hajime Ootani (chief episode)	Kouichi Yasuda	Media-mix project	12	
2021	Pretty Boy Detective Club	Akiyuki Shinbo (chief); Hajime Ootani	Kenjirou Okada (assistant)	Kouichi Yasuda	Light novel	12	
2021	Magia Record: Puella Magi Madoka Magica Side Story - Eve of Awakening	Doroinu (chief); Yukihiro Miyamoto	Midori Yoshizawa (assistant)	Yuuya Matsukawa	Mobile game	8	
2022	Magia Record: Puella Magi Madoka Magica Side Story - Dawn of a Shallow Dream	Doroinu (chief); Yukihiro Miyamoto	Midori Yoshizawa (assistant)	Yuuya Matsukawa	Mobile game	4	
2022	Luminous Witches	Shouji Saeki	Kana Shundou (assistant)	Kouichi Yasuda	Media-mix project	12 (Note: A special episode of Luminous Witches was released on December 23, 2020.)	
2022	RWBY: Ice Queendom	Toshimasa Suzuki	Kenjirou Okada (chief)	Yuuya Matsukawa	Web series	12	
2025	A Ninja and an Assassin Under One Roof	Yukihiro Miyamoto	—N/a	Masaki Kudou	Manga	12	
2027	Just Like Mona Lisa	Kana Shundo	Kouji Matsumura (assistant)	TBA	Manga	TBA	
TBA	The Long Summer of August 31st	TBA	TBA	TBA	Manga	TBA	

=== Anime films ===
Year	Title	Director(s)	Series director(s)	Animation producer(s)	Source	Refs.
2007	Kino's Journey: Country of Illness -For You-	Ryūtarō Nakamura	—N/a	Mitsutoshi Kubota	Manga	
2011	Mahō Sensei Negima! Anime Final (co-animated with Studio Pastoral) (Note: Although individual staff members and departments from Shaft are listed in the film's credits, Shaft and Shinbo's names are otherwise completely omitted (thereby uncredited) in the BluRay version of the film. The DVD/streaming version still credits them, however.)	Akiyuki Shinbo	Kenichi Ishikura (assistant)	Yuuji Kanno; Mitsutoshi Kubota	Manga	
2012	Puella Magi Madoka Magica: Beginnings	Akiyuki Shinbo (chief); Yukihiro Miyamoto	Hiroyuki Terao (assistant)	Yasuhiro Okada	Original work	
2012	Puella Magi Madoka Magica: Eternal	Akiyuki Shinbo (chief); Yukihiro Miyamoto	Hiroyuki Terao (assistant)	Yasuhiro Okada	Original work	
2013	Puella Magi Madoka Magica: Rebellion	Akiyuki Shinbo (chief); Yukihiro Miyamoto	Hiroyuki Terao (assistant)	Yasuhiro Okada	Original work	
2016	Kizumonogatari I: Tekketsu	Akiyuki Shinbo (chief); Tatsuya Oishi	—N/a	Kousuke Matsunaga; Takuo Yukinaga	Light novel	
2016	Kizumonogatari II: Nekketsu	Akiyuki Shinbo (chief); Tatsuya Oishi	—N/a	Kousuke Matsunaga; Takuo Yukinaga	Light novel	
2017	Kizumonogatari III: Reiketsu	Akiyuki Shinbo (chief); Tatsuya Oishi	—N/a	Kousuke Matsunaga; Takuo Yukinaga	Light novel	
2017	Fireworks, Should We See It from the Side or the Bottom?	Akiyuki Shinbo (chief); Nobuyuki Takeuchi	Seimei Kidokoro (assistant)	Kazuki Soumiya	Live-action film	
2023	The Quintessential Quintuplets~	Yukihiro Miyamoto	—N/a	Yuuya Matsukawa	Manga	
2024	Kizumonogatari: Koyomi Vamp	Tatsuya Oishi	—N/a	—N/a	Light novel	
2025	Virgin Punk: Clockwork Girl	Yasuomi Umetsu	—N/a	Ryuusuke Suzuki	Original work	
2026	Puella Magi Madoka Magica: Walpurgisnacht: Rising	Akiyuki Shinbo (chief); Yukihiro Miyamoto	—N/a	Yuuya Matsukawa; Masaru Hashimoto	Original work	

=== Original video animations ===
Year	Title	Director(s)	Series director(s)	Animation producer(s)	Source	Eps.	Refs.
1987	Yume kara, Samenai	Osamu Inoue	—N/a	Producer: Takuya Minagawa	Manga	1	
1987	Taiman Blues: Shimizu Naoto-hen	Takao Yotsuji	—N/a	—N/a	Manga	1	
1996	Inma Daitoshi (credited as C&R)	Shinichi Watanabe	—N/a	Ippei Shishimaru (獅子丸一平) (Note: A penname.)	Original work	2	
1997	Sakura Diaries	Kunitoshi Okajima	—N/a	Producer: Hiroshi Wakao	Manga	12	
2002–2003	Arcade Gamer Fubuki	Yūji Mutō	—N/a	Mitsutoshi Kubota	Manga	4	
2006	Mahō Sensei Negima!: Spring (Haru)	Akiyuki Shinbo (chief); Shin Oonuma	—N/a	Mitsutoshi Kubota	Manga	1	
2006	Mahō Sensei Negima!: Summer (Natsu)	Akiyuki Shinbo (chief); Shin Oonuma	—N/a	Mitsutoshi Kubota	Manga	1	
2008–2009	Mahō Sensei Negima!: Shiroki Tsubasa Ala Alba (co-animated with Studio Pastoral)	Akiyuki Shinbo (chief); Hiroaki Tomita (#1); Yukihiro Miyamoto (#2); Tomoyuki Itamura (#3)	—N/a	Mitsutoshi Kubota	Manga	3	
2008–2009	(Goku) Sayonara, Zetsubou-Sensei	Akiyuki Shinbo	Naoyuki Tatsuwa (assistant); Yukihiro Miyamoto (chief episode)	Mitsutoshi Kubota	Manga	3	
2009–2010	Mahō Sensei Negima!: Mō Hitotsu no Sekai (co-animated with Studio Pastoral)	Akiyuki Shinbo (chief); Kōbun Shizuno (#1–2); Tomokazu Tokoro (#3–4); Tatsufumi Itō (#5)	—N/a	Mitsusohi Kubota	Manga	5	
2009–2010	(Zan) Sayonara, Zetsubou-Sensei Bangaichi	Akiyuki Shinbo	Naoyuki Tatsuwa (assistant); Yukihiro Miyamoto (chief episode)	Mitsutoshi Kubota	Manga	2	
2010	Anime Shounen Maid Curo-kun: Tenshi no Uta (credited as Zyc)	Katsuyoshi Yatabe	—N/a	Shirou Tofuya (東風屋志郎)	Manga	1	
2011	Katteni Kaizō	Akiyuki Shinbo (chief); Naoyuki Tatsuwa	—N/a	Mitsutoshi Kubota	Manga	6	
2011	Star Jewel (credited as Zyc)	Yoshiten	—N/a	Shirou Tofuya (東風屋志郎)	Original work	1	
2013	Hidamari Sketch: Sae & Hiro's Graduation Arc	Akiyuki Shinbo (chief); Yuki Yase	—N/a	Producer: Miku Ooshima	Manga	2	
2014–2015	Nisekoi	Akiyuki Shinbo (chief); Naoyuki Tatsuwa	—N/a	Hitoshi Fujikawa (1–2); Kousuke Matsunaga (3)	Manga	3	
2015	Magical Suite Prism Nana	Yukihiro Miyamoto (#1, 3); Seiya Numata (#2); Hajime Ootani (#4)	—N/a	Yasuhiro Okada	Media-mix project	3	
2016	Nisekoi:	Akiyuki Shinbo (chief)	Yukihiro Miyamoto (chief episode)	Kousuke Matsunaga	Manga	2	
2016–2017	The Beheading Cycle: The Blue Savant and the Nonsense Bearer	Akiyuki Shinbo (chief); Yuki Yase	—N/a	Kazuki Soumiya	Light novel	8	

=== Original net animations ===
Year	Title	Director(s)	Series director(s)	Animation producer(s)	Source	Eps.	Note(s)	Refs.
2016	Koyomimonogatari	Akiyuki Shinbo (chief); Tomoyuki Itamura	—N/a	Kazuki Soumiya	Light novel	12		
2021–2022	Assault Lily Fruits	Shouji Saeki	—N/a	Kouichi Yasuda	Media-mix project	13		
2024	Monogatari Series Off & Monster Season	Akiyuki Shinbo (chief); Midori Yoshizawa	—N/a	Yuuya Matsukawa; Ryuusuke Suzuki (Note: Suzuki credited from episode 6.5 to episode 8.)	Light novel	14		
2026	Fool Night	Atsushi Yukawa	Ryou Shimura (assistant)	Yoshihiro Iwata; Ryuusuke Suzuki	Manga	TBA	Co-production with Sunrise	

=== Video game work ===
Year	Title	Developer	Animation producer(s)	Role(s)	Note(s)	Refs.
2013	Fate/Extra CCC	Type-Moon; Imageepoch	Production manager: Ryuusuke Suzuki	Opening animation production	Directed by Akiyuki Shinbo.	
2016	Fate/EXTELLA	Marvelous	Production manager: Kazumasa Amitani	Opening animation production	Directed by Yukihiro Miyamoto.	
2017–2024	Magia Record	f4samurai	Ryuusuke Suzuki; Yasuhiro Okada	Production assistance Opening and cutscene animation production	Various directors. (Note: Shaft-produced sequences directed by Seiya Numata, Naoaki Shibuta, Yukihiro Miyamoto, Doroinu, Hajime Ootani, Kenjirou Okada, Shuuji Miyazaki, Mitsuru Ishihara, and Rina Iwamoto.)	
2018	Monogatari Series PucPuc	NHN PlayArt	—N/a	Illustration assistance		
2018	Crystar	Gemdrops	Kousuke Matsunaga	Opening animation production	Directed by Tatsuya Oishi.	
2021–present	Assault Lily Last Bullet	Pokelabo	Kouichi Yasuda	Planning and production Opening and cutscene animation production	Various directors. (Note: Opening directed by Seiya Numata, with cutscenes directed by Ayumu Uwano and Ken Sanuma.)	
2025–present	Puella Magi Madoka Magica: Magia Exedra	Pokelabo f4samurai	Masahiko Hirokane (LDH Animation)	Opening animation production	Directed by Yoshifumi Sasahara.	

=== Other productions ===
- Shina Dark (OVA, March 21, 2008) – four music video shorts for the manga by Bunjūrō Nakayama; directed by Naoyuki Konno, Shinpei Tomooka, Shin Oonuma, and Toshimasa Suzuki.
- MAG Net (TV series, 2010) – opening animation for the television series; directed by Tatsuya Oishi.
- Palutena's Revolting Dinner (ONA, March 19, 2012) – two promotional shorts for Kid Icarus: Uprising; directed by Akiyuki Shinbo.
- Goddess of Light (ONA, June 10, 2014) – Palutena character reveal trailer for Super Smash Bros. for Nintendo 3DS and Wii U.
- Okitegami Kyouko no Bibouroku x Monogatari (ONA, December 31, 2014) – promotional video for Nisio Isin's Boukyaku Tantei Series, featuring characters from the Monogatari series; directed by Yukihiro Miyamoto.
- IRoid: Koi no Yūkō Frontier (ONA, December 14, 2015) – Promotional short for the dating simulator app IRoid by QUICK.
- Kakushigoto (ONA, June 14, 2016) – promotional short for the manga by Kōji Kumeta; directed by Yukihiro Miyamoto.
- Akuma no Memumemu-chan (ONA, January 22, 2018) – promotional short for the manga by Keitarо̄ Yotsuya; directed by Seiya Numata.
- "Ikebukuro PR Animation" (ONA, January 17, 2019) – promotional short for the Ikebukuro district in Tokyo's Toshima ward; directed by Yukio Takatsu.
- "Limited Time Fate/EXTRA CCC x Fate/Grand Order Special Event 'Deep Sea Dennou Rakudo SE.RA.PH' Announcement CM" (ONA, May 7, 2017) – promotional short for a crossover event between the Fate/Extra CCC and Fate/Grand Order video games.
- "Hungry Days" (ONA, May 21, 2019, September 12, 2019, December 5, 2019, February 7, 2020) – series of four commercials for Nissin's Cup Noodles featuring characters from One Piece; directed by Yūsuke Takase
- Choujuu Giga Gao Road Chocolate Dai 0-dan (ONA, February 20, 2021) – promotional commercial directed by Kiyoyuki Amano.
- Taishou Romance (music video, September 16, 2021) – music video for the song by YOASOBI; directed by Yūsuke Takase.
- Bakemonogatari (ONA, February 17, 2022) – promotional video for the manga adaptation of Bakemonogatari by Oh! Great; directed by Akiyuki Shinbo.
- J:COM x U25 Kankyou wo Kangaeru Project CM (ONA, July 3, 2023) – promotional video for J:COM's environmental awareness "U25 Kankyou wo Kangaeru Project"; directed by Ryou Shimura.
- "Baton Concept Movie" (ONA, December 1, 2023) – corporate short film promoting "Baton", an education-focused app; directed by Yūsuke Takase.
- Fate/Grand Order Explore Movie 2024 "Wanted" (ONA, August 3, 2024) – promotional short film for the Fate/Grand Order mobile game; directed by Hiroto Nagata.

=== Gross outsource ===
Episodes, series, and other projects in which Shaft was not the prime contractor for but subcontracted to for animation services either across the entire series or to produce an episode or part of the work. These do not include minor outsourcing credits such as key animation, in-between animation, or cel-painting. Gross outsourcing is also referred to as "full" outsourcing. The studio was active in gross outsourcing for companies and other studios from the time its animation department was formed in the early 80s up until 2004 when the company switched to almost exclusively contributing only to its own productions. Since 2019, the studio has occasionally worked as a gross outsource company for other studios once again.

List of gross outsources
Year	Title	Primary contractor(s)	Director(s)	Episode(s)	Note(s)	Refs.
1980–1981	Time Bokan Series: Time Patrol Tai Otasukeman	Tatsunoko Production	Hiroshi Sasagawa; Nobuo Oonuki	11, 19, 21, 25, 36, 47, 53		
1982–1983	Hitotsuboshi-ke no Ultra Baasan	Knack Productions	Masuji Harata	1–13		
1983	Superbook 2	Tatsunoko Production	Masakazu Higuchi	1–26		
1983	Serendipity the Pink Dragon	Zuiyo	Nobuo Oonuki	11–26		
1984	Attacker You!	Knack Productions	Kazuyuki Okasako	1–15		
1984–1985	Elves of the Forest	Zuiyo	Masakazu Higuchi	1–23		
1987–1988	Hiatari Ryōkō!	Group TAC	Gisaburō Sugii; Hiroko Tokita	3, 8, 15, 21, 27, 38, 43, 48		
1988	Hiatari Ryōkō! Kasumi: Yume no Naka ni Kimi ga Ita	Group TAC	Kimiharu Oguma		TV film	
1990–1991	Kyatto Ninden Teyandee	Tatsunoko Production	Kunitoshi Okajima	5, 9, 13, 16, 19, 22, 25, 27, 30, 32; 34, 36, 38, 41, 44, 47, 50, 52		
1991	Ushiro no Shoumen Daare	Mushi Production	Seiji Arihara		Film	
1991	Oh! My Konbu	Kodansha, VAP	Tetsuo Imazawa	4, 8, 12, 16, 20		(Note: Credited as Animation Production (アニメーション製作) for respective episodes. However, Studio Toriumi produced most of the episodes, and neither Shaft nor Toriumi were primary contractors for the work.)
1991	Dark Genesis	Tatsunoko Production	Yoshihisa Matsumoto	1	OVA	
1992–1993	Little Twins		Toshio Hirata; Isamu Tsuchida	Unknown	OVA	
1994	Goal Field Hunter	Image Key	Masakazu Higuchi; Kunitoshi Okajima	Unknown		
1994–1995	The Legend of Snow White	Tatsunoko Production	Kunitoshi Okajima			
1995	Bonobono	Group TAC	Hitoshi Nanba	8, 23, 29, 46		
1996–1997	Legend of the Galactic Heroes	K-Factory	Noboru Ishiguro et al.	87, 90, 93, 96, 99, 102, 105, 108	OVA	
1996–1997	Kiko-chan's Smile	Magic Bus	Setsuko Shibuichi	1, 4, 14, 17, 23, 38, 50		
1997	Legend of Crystania: The Chaos Ring	Triangle Staff	Ryūtarō Nakamura	2	OVA	
1997	Mach Go Go Go: Restart	Tatsunoko Production	Hiroshi Sasagawa et al.	5, 9, 14, 19, 25		
1997	Hareluya II Boy	Triangle Staff	Kiyoshi Egami	3		
1997	Revolutionary Girl Utena	J.C.Staff	Kunihiko Ikuhara	15, 20, 29, 37		
1997–1998	Battle Athletes Victory	AIC	Katsuhito Akiyama	1–26		
1998	A Hundred Billion Stars, a Hundred Billion Lights	K-Factory	Noboru Ishiguro et al.	5–8, 17	OVA	
1998	Generator Gawl	Tatsunoko Production	Seiji Mizushima	4, 6, 10		
1998	Silent Möbius	Radix	Hideki Tonokatsu; Nobuyuki Takeuchi	1–26 (except 14, 19, 23)		
1998–1999	Totsugeki! Pappara-tai	Magic Bus	Kenichi Maejima	5, 10, 16		
1999	Space Pirate Mito	Triangle Staff	Takashi Watanabe	2, 4, 6, 8, 10, 12		
1999	Dual! Parallel Trouble Adventure	AIC	Katsuhito Akiyama	1–13		
1999	Power Stone	Pierrot	Takahiro Omori	9, 16		
1999	Magic User's Club	Triangle Staff, Madhouse	Junichi Sato	10		
1999	Dai-Guard	Xebec	Seiji Mizushima	11		
1999	Now and Then, Here and There	AIC	Akitaro Daichi	5, 10		
1999	A Pair of Queens	Triangle Staff	Takashi Watanabe	2, 4, 7, 9		
1999–2000	Blue Gender	AIC	Masami Abe	4, 10, 16, 22		
1999–2000	Excel Saga	J.C.Staff	Shinichi Watanabe	4, 9, 14, 19, 24		
2000	Boogiepop Phantom	Madhouse	Takashi Watanabe	2, 5, 7, 11–12		
2000	NieA_7	Triangle Staff	Tomokazu Tokoro; Takuya Satō	11		
2000	Sakura Wars	Madhouse	Ryūtarō Nakamura	1–25		
2000	Kita e.: Pure Session	Studio D-Volt	Mitsuko Kase		OVA	
2000–2001	Saiyuki	Pierrot	Hayato Date	3, 9, 15, 21, 27–50		
2001	Initial D: Third Stage	Studio Deen	Fumitsugu Yamaguchi		Film	
2001	Sister Princess	Zexcs	Kiyotaka Ohata	4		
2001	The SoulTaker	Tatsunoko Production/VCR	Akiyuki Shinbo	10		
2001	Kikaider 01: The Animation	Radix, Studio OX	Keitarou Motonaga	2	OVA	
2001–2002	Okojo's Happy Apartment	Radix	Yuusuke Yamamoto	2, 5, 8, 19, 24-25, 27; 29, 33, 36, 39, 42, 45, 48		
2001–2002	Android Kikaider: The Animation	Radix, Studio OX	Tensai Okamura	2, 7–8, 12		
2001–2002	Cyborg 009: The Cyborg Soldier	Japan Vistec	Jun Kawagoe	3, 27-28, 31, 34, 44, 46		
2002	Seven of Seven	A.C.G.T	Yasuhiro Imagawa	14		
2002	WXIII: Patlabor the Movie 3	Madhouse	Fumihiko Takayama; Takuji Endou		Film	
2003	Heat Guy J	Satelight	Kazuki Akane	19		
2003	Dear Boys	A.C.G.T	Susumu Kudou	3, 7, 12, 18, 23		
2003	Kino's Journey	A.C.G.T	Ryūtarō Nakamura	7		
2003	Neon Genesis Evangelion: Girlfriend of Steel 2nd	Gainax			Video game	
2004	Misaki Chronicles	Radix	Jun Takada; Hiroshi Negishi	2		
2004	Maburaho	J.C.Staff	Shinichiro Kimura	11		
2004	Gilgamesh	Group TAC, Japan Vistec	Masahiko Murata	16, 22		
2004	Tetsujin 28-go	Palm Studio	Yasuhiro Imagawa	3, 6, 9		
2004	Gakuen Alice	Group TAC	Takahiro Omori	4, 10		
2004	Uta Kata	Hal Film Maker	Keiji Gotoh	4		
2019	The Quintessential Quintuplets	Tezuka Productions	Satoshi Kuwabara	11		
2023	Mashle	A-1 Pictures	Tomoya Tanaka	7		
2023	The Café Terrace and Its Goddesses	Tezuka Productions	Satoshi Kuwabara	9		
2023	Zom 100: Bucket List of the Dead	Bug Films	Kazuki Kawagoe	2–5		
2024	Mashle 2nd Season	A-1 Pictures	Tomoya Tanaka	2		

== Notable staff ==
=== Representative staff ===
- Hiroshi Wakao (founder, first president (1975~2004), and chairman (2004~))
- Tomio Wakao (board member, 1976~2004)
- Mitsutoshi Kubota (Second president (2004~), managing director (1995~2004), and color designer (1981~1995))
- Kouji Tanoue (board member, licensing division manager, former production manager)
- Tamiko Nishimaki (board member, former color designer)
- Miku Ooshima (board member, producer, and screenplay writer)
- Nobuki Maki (board member, former production manager)
- Natsuko Kubota (board member, former color designer)
- Kayoko Mizusawa (board member)

=== Animation producers ===
- Shigeyuki Amemiya (2006~present)
- Kazumasa Amitani (2007~present)
- Tadao Iwaki (2010~2011, 2014~2017)
- Kousuke Matsunaga (2010~2018)
- Kazuki Soumiya (2010~2019)
- Kouichi Yasuda (2010~2022)
- Ryuusuke Suzuki (2010~present)
- Yasuhiro Okada (2010~present)
- Hitoshi Fujikawa (2012~2015)
- Takuo Yukinaga (2012~2019)
- Yuuya Matsukawa (2012~present)
- Masaki Kudou (2022~present)
- Masaru Hashimoto (2026~present)

=== Production staff ===
- Masahiko Murata (animator, 1982~1987)
- Hiroyuki Morita (animator, 1987)
- Yutaka Nagaushi (production assistant, 1987~1995; founder of Digital Network Animation)
- Toshimasa Suzuki (animator, 1987~2000; currently freelances as a director)
- Yoshiaki Itou (character designer and animator, 1987~present)
- Masahiko Nakada (animator, 1990~1995)
- Makoto Kohara (animator, 1996~2001; founder of Diomedéa)
- Mai Ootsuka (animator, 1998~2003)
- Naoko Shiraishi (production assistant, 2000~2002; later founded Millepensee)
- Nobuhiro Sugiyama (character designer and animator, 2001~present)
- Kazuya Shiotsuki (character designer and animator, 2002~present)
- Yasuko Watanabe (color designer, 2000~present)
- Genichirou Abe (animator, 2003~present)
- Kazuhiro Oota (character designer and animator, 2004~2009)
- Shin Oonuma (director, 2004~2009)
- Naoyuki Tatsuwa (director, 2004~2015)
- Tatsuya Oishi (director, 2004~2018)
- Akiyuki Shinbo (director, 2004~present)
- Tomoyuki Itamura (director, 2007~2017)
- Yukihiro Miyamoto (director, 2007~present) (Note: Miyamoto may have acted as a freelance director for much of his time with Shaft, but Megami Magazine referred to him and directors Kouji Matsumura and Midori Yoshizawa as "directors belonging to Shaft" (シャフト所属の演出家) in a 2023 interview.)
- Yuki Yase (director, 2010~2017)
- Hiroki Yamamura (character designer and animator, 2012~present) (Note: Yamamura worked for Studio Pastoral between 2004~2012 and was oftentimes contracted for work by Shaft. Following his departure, he worked exclusively with Shaft, though his unemployment during the time period is ambiguous. In 2020, he and animator Genichirou Abe participated on Onimai: I'm Now Your Sister! (2023) listed as members of "(Shaft)", and his Twitter account briefly mentioned his affiliation with the company.)
- Yasuomi Umetsu (director, 2017~present)
- Hisaharu Iijima (art department technical advisor/art director, 2020~present)

=== Notable associated freelancers ===
- Akio Watanabe (character designer and animator)
- Hajime Ueda (illustrator)
- Ume Aoki (illustrator)
- Gekidan Inu Curry (directors and animators)
- Ryouki Kamitsubo (director)
- Kenichi Ishikura (director)
- Shinichi Omata (director)
- Nobuyuki Takeuchi (director and animator)
- Shouji Saeki (director)
- Yasuomi Umetsu (director)
- Hajime Ootani (director)
- Kenjirou Okada (director)

== Revenue ==
A 2023 government case study reported the company's sales revenue as ¥1.31 billion for the fiscal year ending March 2021.

== See also ==
- Mushi Production—founder Hiroshi Wakao was a part of Mushi Production prior to Shaft's foundation
- Gainax—worked closely with Shaft in the early-to-mid 2000s
- Millepensee—founded by ex-Shaft production manager Naoko Shiraishi
- Diomedéa—founded by ex-Shaft animator Makoto Kohara
- Silver Link—ex-Shaft director Shin Oonuma works with Silver Link in a similar position to Shinbo's at Shaft

== Notes ==
=== Works cited ===
- Suzuki, Akito; Harada, Nobukatsu; Kirikata, Runta (2004). この醜くも美しい世界公式ビジュアルブック [This Ugly Yet Beautiful World Official Visual Book] (in Japanese). Media Works. ISBN 978-4840229050.
- Maeda, Hisashi; Hiraiwa, Shinsuke (2007). アニメ新表現宣言！新房監督作品の奥にアニメ表現の最先端を見た！ [Declaration of a New Expression for Anime! I saw the Cutting Edge of Anime Expression in Director Shinbo's Work!] (in Japanese). Tamon Creative.
- Kizawa, Yukito; Nakamoto, Muneo; Yanagi, Yuuichi, eds. (2008). Hidamari Sketch Album. Houbunsha. ISBN 978-4832277403.
- Magica Quartet (2011). 魔法少女まどか☆マギカ公式ガイドブック you are not alone. [Puella Magi Madoka Magica Official Guidebook you are not alone.]. Houbunsha. ISBN 978-4832240612.
- Oguro, Yuuichirou (May 2, 2011). さよなら絶望先生全書(ANIMESTYLE ARCHIVE) [Sayonara, Zetsubou-Sensei Complete ANIMESTYLE ARCHIVE] (in Japanese). Anime Style. ISBN 978-4902948080.
- Shinbo, Akiyuki (2012). 新房語 [Shinbogatari] (in Japanese). Ichijinsha. ISBN 978-4758012591.
- Kizawa, Yukito, ed. (2013). ひだまりスケッチデイズ -TVアニメ公式ガイドブック- [Hidamari Sketch Days: TV Anime Official Guidiebook]. Houbunsha. ISBN 978-4832277403.
- Kizawa, Yukito; Takayama, Atsushi; Saitou, Fusano, eds. (2014). 劇場版魔法やまどかマギカ[新編]叛逆の物語公式ガイドブック only you. [Movie Version Puella Magi Madoka Magica [New Edition] Story of Rebellion Official Guidebook only you.]. Houbunsha. ISBN 978-4832244290.
- Rubin, Lucy Paige (2017). Between Comedy and Despair: The House Style of Studio Shaft (Bachelor of the Arts). Wesleyan University.
- Kushida, Makoto, ed. (2017). 〈物語〉Febri ["Monogatari" Febri] (in Japanese). Ichijinsha. ASIN B075QWP3NZ.
- Takahashi, Yumi, ed. (November 23, 2019). Akiyuki Shimbo x Shaft Chronicle (in Japanese). Dotcom. ISBN 978-4835457017.
- Maeda, Hisashi; Nakagami, Yoshikatsu; Kawabata, Takeshi; Nishitani, Nanako (2020). マギアレコード 魔法少女まどか☆マギカ外伝 TVアニメ公式ガイドブック 1巻 [Magia Record Puella Magi Madoka Magica TV Anime Official Guidebook Volume 1] (in Japanese). Houbunsha. ISBN 978-4832272019.
- Aniplex (2021). Pretty Boy Detective Club Vol. 5 Special Booklet. Aniplex.
- Newtype (February 10, 2025). Newtype March 2025 (in Japanese). Kadokawa Shoten.
- Umetsu, Yasuomi (August 25, 2025). Unfinished 梅津泰臣アニメーションワークス [Unfinished: Yasuomi Umetsu Animation Works] (in Japanese). Genkosha.
