= Yuki Yase =

Japanese director and storyboard artist

Yuki Yase 八瀬 祐樹
- Born: Japan
- Occupations: Director, storyboard artist
- Years active: 2005–present
- Employer(s): Satelight (2005–2009); Shaft (2010–2018)
- Known for: Hidamari Sketch x Honeycomb; Mekakucity Actors; Fire Force

Yuki Yase (Japanese: 八瀬 祐樹, Hepburn: Yase Yūki) is a Japanese director and storyboard artist. He joined Satelight in 2005 as a production assistant. In 2010, Yase joined Shaft as an episode director, and made his series directorial debut with Hidamari Sketch x Honeycomb.

== Career ==
Yase began his career in the anime industry as a production manager with Satelight in 2005. He became an episode director with the studio and eventually left by the end of 2009. In 2010, he joined Shaft and directed two episodes of the Akiyuki Shinbo series And Yet the Town Moves. In 2012, under the chief direction of Shinbo, Yase debuted as a series director with Hidamari Sketch x Honeycomb, and the following year directed Onimonogatari and Koimonogatari (the final two arcs of Monogatari Series Second Season) under chief director Shinbo and director Tomoyuki Itamura. For Hidamari Sketch x Honeycomb, Yase was originally just placed in charge of directing the first episode and the ending animation, but was also later asked to do the opening animation as well and was eventually asked if he was interested in the role of series director. By the time he took on the role, the series' storyboards had been completed to episode 8.

In 2014, Yase was given the directorial position for the anime adaptation of JIN's mixed-media project Kagerou Daze, and in 2016/2017 would direct his final series with Shaft: Kubikiri Cycle: The Beheading Cycle and the Blue Savant. The following year, he departed from Shaft, and in 2019 he directed the first season of Fire Force with David Production. Yase has since continued to base himself out of David Productions; and while he did not return for the second season of Fire Force, he directed the studio's adaptation of Undead Unluck in 2023. During this time, he also continued to contribute storyboards to some Shaft series.

== Works ==
=== Television series ===
In "Director(s)" column highlights Yase's directorial works.

Year	Title	Director(s)	Studio	SB (Note: Storyboard artist.)	ED (Note: Episode director, equivalent to unit director.)	Other roles and notes	Ref(s)
2005	Noein: To Your Other Self	Kazuki Akane	Satelight	No	No	Production assistant	
2008	Shugo Chara!! Doki—	Kenji Yasuda	Satelight	No	Yes		
2009	White Album	Akira Yoshimura	Seven Arcs	Yes	Yes		
2009	Shugo Chara! Party!	Kenji Yasuda (chief); Tatsufumi Itou	Satelight	No	Yes		
2010	Durarara!!	Takahiro Omori	Brain's Base	No	Yes		
2010	And Yet the Town Moves	Akiyuki Shinbo	Shaft	No	Yes		
2011	Puella Magi Madoka Magica	Akiyuki Shinbo; Yukihiro Miyamoto (series)	Shaft	No	Yes		
2011	Ground Control to Psychoelectric Girl	Akiyuki Shinibo (chief); Yukihiro Miyamoto	Shaft	No	Yes		
2012	Hidamari Sketch x Honeycomb	Akiyuki Shinbo; Yuki Yase (series)	Shaft	Yes	Yes		
2012	Nisemonogatari	Akiyuki Shinbo; Tomoyuki Itamura (series)	Shaft	Yes	Yes		
2013	Monogatari Series Second Season	Akiyuki Shinbo (chief); Tomoyuki Itamura; Naoyuki Tatsuwa (#6–9, series); Yuki Yase (#14–17, series)	Shaft	Yes	Yes		
2014	Mekakucity Actors	Akiyuki Shinbo (chief); Yuki Yase	Shaft	Yes	Yes		
2015	Yurikuma Arashi	Kunihiko Ikuhara	Silver Link	No	Yes		
2015	Gourmet Girl Graffiti	Akiyuki Shinbo (chief); Naoyuki Tatsuwa	Shaft	Yes	No	Ending director	
2015	Nisekoi:	Akiyuki Shinbo (chief); Yukihiro Miyamoto (chief episode)	Shaft	Yes	Yes		
2018	Fate/Extra: Last Encore	Akiyuki Shinbo (chief); Yukihiro Miyamoto (series)	Shaft	No	No	Opening director	
2019	Fire Force	Yuki Yase	David Production	Yes	Yes	Opening director	
2021	Magia Record: Puella Magi Madoka Magica Side Story - The Eve of Awakening	Doroinu (chief); Yukihiro Miyamoto	Shaft	Yes	No		
2022	Akebi's Sailor Uniform	Miyuki Kuroki	CloverWorks	Yes	No		
2022	RWBY: Ice Queendom	Toshimasa Suzuki; Kenjirou Okada (chief)	Shaft	Yes	No		
2023	Undead Unluck	Yuki Yase	David Production	Yes	Yes		
2025	A Ninja and an Assassin Under One Roof	Yukihiro Miyamoto	Shaft	Yes	No		

==== OVAs ====
Year	Title	Director(s)	Studio	SB	ED	Other roles and notes	Ref(s)
2013	Hidamari Sketch: Sae & Hiro's Graduation Arc	Akiyuki Shinbo (chief); Yuki Yase	Shaft	Yes	Yes		
2016	Magical Pâtissier Kosaki-chan	Akiyuki Shinbo (chief); Yukihiro Miyamoto (chief episode)	Shaft	Yes	Yes		
2016	The Beheading Cycle: The Blue Savant and the Nonsense Bearer	Akiyuki Shinbo (chief); Yuki Yase	Shaft	Yes	Yes	Ending director and storyboard	

==== Films ====
Year	Title	Director(s)	Studio	SB	ED	Other roles and notes	Ref(s)
2012	Puella Magi Madoka Magica the Movie: Beginnings	Akiyuki Shinbo (chief); Yukihiro Miyamoto	Shaft	No	Yes		

== Notes ==
=== Works cited ===
- Kizawa, Yukito, ed. (2013). ひだまりスケッチデイズ -TVアニメ公式ガイドブック- [Hidamari Sketch Days: TV Anime Official Guidiebook]. Houbunsha. ISBN 978-4832277403.
