= A Ninja and an Assassin Under One Roof =

Japanese manga series

- First tankōbon volume cover, featuring Satoko Kusagakure (left) and Konoha Koga (right)

忍者と殺し屋のふたりぐらし (Ninja to Koroshiya no Futarigurashi)
- Genre: Black comedy; Slice of life
- Manga
- Written by: HundredBurger
- Published by: ASCII Media Works
- English publisher: NA: Seven Seas Entertainment
- Imprint: Dengeki Comics NEXT
- Magazine: Comic Dengeki Daioh "g"
- Original run: February 26, 2021 – present
- Volumes: 6
- Anime television series
- Directed by: Yukihiro Miyamoto
- Produced by: Toshinori Fujiwara (Kadokawa); Yuuya Matsukawa (Shaft); Kouji Sawahata (Pony Canyon); Satoshi Okazaki (Kansai TV) (Note: Okazaki credited in episodes 1–8, and Matsumura credited in episodes 9–12.); Nao Matsumura (Kansai TV); Mao Higashi (BS11); Fumi Miura (Movic); Aya Iizuka (AT-X)
- Written by: Shaft (Note: Credited under the collective pseudonym Fuyashi Tou. Series composition.); Maho Nishibe (Note: Screenplay)
- Music by: Ryūnosuke Kasai
- Studio: Shaft
- Licensed by: Crunchyroll; SEA: Tropics Entertainment
- Original network: AT-X, Tokyo MX, BS11, Kansai TV, MTV
- Original run: April 10, 2025 – June 26, 2025
- Episodes: 12

A Ninja and an Assassin Under One Roof (Japanese: 忍者と殺し屋のふたりぐらし, Hepburn: Ninja to Koroshiya no Futarigurashi; lit. 'A Ninja and Assassin Living Together'), also known as NinKoro (にんころ), is a Japanese manga series by HundredBurger. It has been serialized in ASCII Media Works' shōnen manga magazine Comic Dengeki Daioh "g" since February 2021 and has been collected in six tankōbon volumes. An anime television series adaptation produced by Shaft aired from April to June 2025.

== Plot ==
A ninja named Satoko Kusagakure is convinced by her leader Kuro to escape her village with other deserters, but without any money or friends in the outside world, Satoko nearly starves until she is saved by another girl named Konoha Koga, who happens to be an assassin. The two girls quickly form a partnership together: Konoha will rise in the rankings to become a top assassin and defend Satoko from other ninjas seeking to hunt down the deserters from the village, and in turn, Satoko will use her ninja magic to help hide the evidence of Konoha's handiwork and clean up Konoha's apartment.

== Characters ==
=== Main characters ===
Satoko Kusagakure (草隠 郷子, Kusagakure Satoko)
Voiced by: Haruna Mikawa
An escapee ninja from the hidden village somewhere in the mountains of rural Japan. She has poor martial arts skills, is a bit incompetent, and was often used to do menial tasks that other ninjas in the village considered beneath them. However, she learned how to clean, cook, and otherwise take care of others through her toil. She specializes in turning non-living people and objects alike into piles of leaves, making it easy to hide evidence and dead bodies.
Konoha Koga (古賀 木葉, Koga Konoha)
Voiced by: Kana Hanazawa
A rookie assassin and high school student seeking to rise through the rankings. Incredibly skilled at assassination, she had trouble rising through the national assassin rankings as she often used points to take care of dead bodies and related chores rather than do them herself. After meeting Satoko, she finds herself slowly rising in rank, though she has trouble warming up to anyone besides herself.
Marin Izutsumi (イズツミ マリン, Izutsumi Marin)
Voiced by: Yū Serizawa
A young mad scientist and rival assassin who designed Roboko to spy on Konoha and remove the competition, later becoming a reluctant friend of both the ninja and the assassin. She and Minato soon begin living in Konoha's house after their homes were accidentally destroyed by Satoko.
Kuro (黒)
Voiced by: Eri Kitamura
The leader of the escapees from the ninja village who actually fled to be with her lover, Yuriko, in the civilian world. A very strong ninja in her own right, though she rarely shows off her skills, she does have the power to briefly hypnotize people and modify their memories. Kuro also enjoys gambling at local pachinko parlors, which frustrates her partner to no end.
Yuriko (百合子)
Voiced by: Rumi Okubo
Kuro's lover willing to offer moral support to her and her friends, though she repeatedly tries to rein in Kuro's frivolous spending on pachinko and other unnecessary objects.

=== Other characters ===
Roboko (ロボ子)
Voiced by: Haruna Mikawa
A robotic duplicate of Satoko that was initially designed to spy on Konoha. However, Konoha soon got attached to Roboko, making Satoko jealous and eventually leading to her destruction. Marin later makes a smaller model, Roboko Mk-II, which retains Roboko's memories, followed by a third model, Mk-III, which more resembles the original model.
Aoko Yoshida (吉田 碧子, Yoshida Aoko)
Voiced by: Yui Ogura
Konoha's classmate who is unaware of her job as an assassin. Aoko's father was one of Konoha's victims, though Aoko is also unaware of this.
Aoi Satou (佐藤 葵, Satō Aoi)
Voiced by: Yuka Iguchi
Aoko's friend who ends up being Konoha's assassination target, albeit her status is unknown.
Minato Izutsumi (イヅツミ ミナト, Izutsumi Minato)
Voiced by: Aimi Tanaka
Marin's older sister, a crazed scientist with a sister complex who murdered their parents. She and Marin began living with Satoko and Konoha after their homes were turned into leaves.

=== Kusagakure ninjas ===
Fumiko Kusagakure (草隠 踏み子, Kusagakure Fumiko)
Voiced by: M.A.O
A ninja assassin who fights using poison-laced throwing knives.
Michiru Kusagakure (草隠 充, Kusagakure Michiru)
Voiced by: Kyōka Moriya
A ninja assassin working under Fumiko who fights using clawed chain weapons.
Midori Kusagakure (草隠 緑, Kusagakure Midori)
Voiced by: Shizuka Ishigami
A ninja who is a master of disguise and specializes in poison.
Asuka Kusagakure (草隠 朱鳥, Kusagakure Asuka)
Voiced by: Tomori Kusunoki
A ninja assassin who keeps her face hidden.
Arisa Kusagakure (草隠 ありさ, Kusagakure Arisa)
Voiced by: Hina Yōmiya
A ninja assassin who wields powerful gauntlets.
Hatsuko Kusagakure (草隠 初子, Kusagakure Hatsuko)
Voiced by: Manaka Iwami
A ninja assassin and Fumiko's younger sister who gathers dead bodies.
Ayaka Kusagakure (草隠 文か, Kusagakure Ayaka)
Voiced by: Mai Narumi
A rogue ninja who has feelings for Kuro.
Mao Kusagakure (草隠 魔王, Kusagakure Mao)
Voiced by: Aoi Koga
A cat-eared ninja assassin who uses a scroll to transform.
Sakura Kusagakure (草隠 櫻, Kusagakure Sakura)
Voiced by: Ayasa Itō
A busty ninja assassin who can store large objects inside her cleavage.
Kanie Kusagakure (草隠 蟹江, Kusagakure Kanie)
Voiced by: Yō Taichi
A ninja assassin who wields a huge spanner.
Karin Kusagakure (草隠 借り主, Kusagakure Karin)
Voiced by: Yumi Uchiyama
A ninja assassin who uses fire ninjutsu and streams on social media.
Meiden Kusagakure (草隠 明電, Kusagakure Meiden)
Voiced by: Yūko Minaguchi
A ninja assassin who wears strong knight armor.
Yukari Kusagakure (草隠 浴衣り, Kusagakure Yukari)
Voiced by: Mayumi Shintani
A ninja assassin who dresses in a bunny girl outfit and fights using razor sharp playing cards and magic act-themed attacks.
Kanon Kusagakure (草隠 火のん, Kusagakure Kanon)
Voiced by: Maaya Uchida^{Ep. 12 credits}
A ninja assassin who wields assorted weapons that come from her sleeves.

== Media ==
=== Manga ===
Written and illustrated by HundredBurger, A Ninja and an Assassin Under One Roof began serialization in ASCII Media Works' shōnen manga magazine Comic Dengeki Daioh "g" on February 26, 2021. The series' chapters have been compiled into six tankōbon volumes as of December 2025. The series will end with the release of its seventh volume.

In April 2025, Seven Seas Entertainment announced that they had licensed the series for English publication beginning in December 2025.

==== Volumes ====
No.	Original release date	Original ISBN	English release date	English ISBN
1	January 27, 2022	978-4-04-914191-7	December 16, 2025	979-8-89561-937-7
Chapters 1–9; Bonus (おまけ, Omake)
2	November 25, 2022	978-4-04-914737-7	March 17, 2026	979-8-89561-938-4
Chapters 10–17; Bonus (おまけ, Omake)
3	July 26, 2023	978-4-04-915164-0	June 9, 2026	979-8-89561-939-1
Chapters 18–25; Bonus (おまけ, Omake)
4	April 26, 2024	978-4-04-915713-0	September 8, 2026	979-8-89561-940-7
Chapters 26–33; Bonus (おまけ, Omake)
5	March 27, 2025	978-4-04-916358-2; 978-4-04-916359-9 (SE)	December 8, 2026	979-8-89765-139-9
Chapters 34–41; Bonus (おまけ, Omake)
6	December 27, 2025	978-4-04-916890-7	—	—
Chapters 42–49; Bonus (おまけ, Omake)

=== Anime ===
An anime adaptation produced by Shaft was announced on April 23, 2024. It was later confirmed to be a television series directed by Yukihiro Miyamoto, with series composition by the staff of Shaft under the collective pseudonym Fuyashi Tou, screenplays by Maho Nishibe, character designs by Kazuya Shiotsuki, and music composed by Ryūnosuke Kasai. The series aired from April 10 to June 26, 2025, on AT-X and other networks. The opening theme song is "Yarenno? Endless" (やれんの？エンドレス, Yarenno? Endoresu; lit. "Shall We Do It? Endless"), performed by Kana Hanazawa, while the ending theme song is "NinKoro Dance" (にんころダンス, Ninkoro Dansu; lit. "Ninja Assassin Dance"), performed by HoneyWorks feat. HaKoniwalily.

Crunchyroll is streaming the series. Tropics Entertainment licensed the series in Southeast Asia for streaming on the Tropics Anime Asia YouTube channel.

==== Episodes ====
No.	Title	Directed by	Storyboarded by	Original release date
1	"A Ninja and an Assassin Meet"; Transliteration: "Ninja to Koroshiya no Deai" (Japanese: 忍者と殺し屋の出会い)	Yukihiro Miyamoto	Yukihiro Miyamoto & Kazuya Shiotsuki (Note: Avant storyboard (アバン絵コンテ) by Hiroki Yamamura.)	April 10, 2025
Satoko Kusagakure, a ninja who was roped by her leader into fleeing her village, passes out in an alley and is found by a high school student named Konoha Koga. After the pair have a meal, Fumiko, a ninja assassin from the Kusagakure clan, shows up and attempts to kill Satoko for her desertion, only to be killed herself by Konoha, who reveals herself to be a professional assassin. Following a follow-up attack by another ninja assassin named Michiru, whom Konoha also kills, Konoha is impressed by Satoko's ability to turn dead bodies and evidence into leaves and decides to have Satoko move into her apartment building as a housekeeper. The next day, Satoko brings a lunch that Konoha left behind to her school. There, she meets Konoha's classmate Aoko Yoshida, whose father Konoha later ends up killing as part of her job. Afterwards, Konoha explains how she is aiming to rise up the assassin rankings to secure better jobs, believing Satoko is the key needed to do so.
2	"Daily Life of a Ninja and an Assassin"; Transliteration: "Ninja to Koroshiya no Nichijō" (Japanese: 忍者と殺し屋の日常)	Shōhei Fujita	Yuki Yase	April 17, 2025
After getting paid for her recent job, Konoha gives Satoko some money to go clothes shopping at the mall, where they encounter and kill another ninja assassin named Asuka. Later, Satoko reunites with Kuro, the leader of the rogue ninjas who plotted the escape so that she could move in with her lover. As she and Konoha get into an argument over Satoko, another ninja assassin named Midori, who is disguised as a restaurant worker, attempts to poison Konoha so she can get to Satoko, but Konoha sees through it and kills Midori in broad daylight, prompting Kuro to use her own ability to erase the memories of nearby witnesses. It is later revealed Midori and Asuka were enjoying their girls' night in with Fumiko when they received a phone call ordering them to hunt Satoko down.
3	"A Ninja and an Assassin's Job"; Transliteration: "Ninja to Koroshiya no Oshigoto" (Japanese: 忍者と殺し屋のお仕事)	Osamu Sumiya	Shūji Miyazaki	April 24, 2025
After seeing Yoshida working part-time as a dog walker, Satoko decides to try working part-time herself but struggles to land any jobs due to her resume. Konoha helps Satoko to write a more embellished resume, which eventually lands her a job, albeit a disturbing one that she ends up quitting right away. Later, Satoko joins Kuro in having a meal with her partner, Yuriko, before Konoha unexpectedly shows up. On the way home, Satoko and Konoha are ambushed by another ninja assassin named Arisa Kusagakure, who attacks with powerful gauntlets but is defeated and killed by Konoha after Satoko turns her gauntlets into leaves.
4	"A Ninja and an Assassin's Relationship"; Transliteration: "Ninja to Koroshiya no Kankei" (Japanese: 忍者と殺し屋の関係)	Kōji Matsumura	Shiyo Hatsumida	May 1, 2025
Feeling unsatisfied with her relationship with Konoha, Satoko turns to Kuro for advice. Believing Satoko wants to become a couple with Konoha, Kuro gives the former some tips on how to get Konoha to notice her. When Konoha sends Satoko alone to dispose of a corpse she killed earlier in the day, she is attacked by ninja assassin Hatsuko, who seeks to have Satoko revive the other ninjas she turned into leaves, but Konoha manages to rescue her, burning up all the other leaves to cook sweet potatoes. Later, Satoko gets kicked out after turning all of Konoha's furniture into leaves and moves in with Kuro and Yuriko, where she learns Kuro has been going to pachinko parlors instead of looking for work. Just then, they come under attack by Ayaka, another ninja. She attempts to kill Yuriko out of jealousy, but is killed by Konoha in order to protect Satoko, who dived in front of her, after which Kuro reveals that Ayaka was actually a fellow rogue ninja. As Satoko returns home with Konoha, they are watched by another girl.
5	"A Robot and an Assassin Under One Roof"; Transliteration: "Robotto to Koroshiya no Futarigurashi" (Japanese: ロボットと殺し屋のふたりぐらし)	Yumena Tokudome & Midori Yoshizawa	Yumena Tokudome & Midori Yoshizawa	May 8, 2025
Marin Izutsumi, a rival assassin looking to surpass Konoha in the rankings, kidnaps Satoko in order to have her skills for herself, leaving a robot duplicate named Roboko in her place. To Satoko's dismay, not only does Konoha fail to notice that something is amiss, but she also starts to grow closer with Roboko than she ever did with the real Satoko. After a month passes, it reaches the point where Konoha sees the real Satoko as a fake and turns against her while Roboko also turns on her creator. Satoko proves herself to be the real thing by turning Roboko into leaves, devastating Konoha, though she nevertheless accepts the truth.
6	"A Busty Girl and an Assassin Under One Roof"; Transliteration: "Kyonyū to Koroshiya no Futarigurashi" (Japanese: 巨乳と殺し屋のふたりぐらし)	Naoaki Shibuta	Naoaki Shibuta	May 15, 2025
As Konoha feels notably down following Roboko's defeat, Marin attempts to avenge Roboko by using one of her inventions on Satoko. When this ends up having the side effect of making her breasts larger, Satoko agrees to work with Marin to gain even larger breasts in order to mimic a ninja assassin they defeated prior. While these end up being a hindrance to her daily life, Satoko remains determined to persevere to be of use to Konoha. Later, Satoko and Konoha visit Kuro and Yuriko for advice on Satoko's breasts, where they come under attack from another ninja assassin due to Satoko using an assassination request to find Kuro's location. On their way home, Satoko learns from Marin that there is apparently no way to return her breasts to normal.
7	"An Assassin and Her Classmate's Friend"; Transliteration: "Koroshiya to Kurasumeito no Otomodachi" (Japanese: 殺し屋とクラスメイトのおともだち)	Shōhei Fujita	Shiyo Hatsumida	May 22, 2025
Following the end of service of her favorite gacha game, Satoko gets help from Yuriko to start a social media account for her cooking. Meanwhile, Aoko invites Konoha to her house to meet her friend Aoi Satou, who gives her advice on her career survey. Noticing Satoko becoming so heated over trying to get more views for her account that it stops being fun, Konoha encourages her to step away from it and buys her a camera so she can simply enjoy photography. After Konoha learns Satoko has been uploading photos of her to her account, she receives a request to assassinate Aoi. Later on, Konoha and Satoko come across Aoko passing out flyers regarding her now missing friend and decide to help her.
8	"A Ninja and an Assassin's Big House"; Transliteration: "Ninja to Koroshiya no Ōkī na Ouchi" (Japanese: 忍者と殺し屋の大きいなおうち)	Kōji Matsumura	Kōji Matsumura	May 29, 2025
Satoko and Konoha's apartment is burned down by a ninja assassin named Karin after Satoko incurred her wrath online. Temporarily staying in Marin's place, she helps them move into a new house that was previously owned by an assassin who went missing, luring Karin into attacking it so they can kill her. Later, the girls start to experience some paranormal phenomenoms, culminating in Marin getting possessed. When Kuro and Yuriko are called in to help, they learn that the house belonged to some ninja assassins Konoha had previously killed while Marin is being possessed by a devil, which Satoko manages to turn into leaves. However, Marin is once again possessed by the spirit of Ayaka, whose leaves were burned up in the apartment fire, prompting Kuro to knock her out. Marin, Kuro, and Yuriko all leave afterwards. Eventually, Satoko and Konoha stop being afraid of the ghost, revealed to be Midori, and turn her into leaves to send her back to the afterlife to rejoin the other fallen ninjas. Meanwhile, Ayaka's ghost is secretly living among Kuro and Yuriko.
9	"A Ninja and an Assassin's Experiment"; Transliteration: "Ninja to Koroshiya no Jikken" (Japanese: 忍者と殺し屋の実験)	Osamu Sumiya	Osamu Sumiya	June 5, 2025
With Satoko's previous ninja attire lost in the apartment fire, she and Konoha try looking in a few stores to little success before ultimately borrowing Kuro's old outfit. Later, Satoko goes over to Marin's place to practice her leaf ninjutsu, testing its effectiveness on large buildings and living things. In the middle of her practice, Satoko is caught by the armored ninja assassin Meiden but manages to beat her by leafing her armor, allowing Konaha to kill her. The next day, Marin arrives at Satoko and Konoha's house injured after her own home, which Satoko attempted to turn into leaves but assumedly could not because of its size, ends up transforming after all following a delay, demanding that they take care of her until she recovers. Meanwhile in the afterlife, the deceased ninjas attempt a livestream while continuing to plot their revenge against Satoko and Konoha.
10	"A Ninja and a Baby Assassin"; Transliteration: "Ninja to Koroshiya no Akachan" (Japanese: 忍者と殺し屋の赤ちゃん)	Shūji Miyazaki	Shūji Miyazaki	June 12, 2025
Having Satoko and Konoha look after her while she recovers from her injuries, Marin tells the two how she fell into the life of an assassin after her older sister killed her parents. It is then that they discover Konoha has turned into a baby after drinking some apple juice that came with a delivery. After going out to buy baby things for Konoha, Satoko discovers Marin has been kidnapped, leaving her alone to look after Konoha, who is rapidly growing into a child. It is then that Satoko is approached by Roboko Mk-II, a miniature version of Roboko, who deduces the culprit behind Marin's kidnapping and Konoha's transformation is Marin's older sister Minato. After receiving training from Roboko, Satoko and the others manage to track down Minato, who turned both of them into children in an attempt to relive their childhood. Thanks to the training she received from Roboko, Satoko manages to rescue Marin by turning the building into leaves. With Marin choosing to let her sister live, Minato gives the only antidote she has to Konoha, who returns to her normal age, albeit with her memories as a child intact.
11	"A Ninja and an Assassin's Big Dilemma"; Transliteration: "Ninja to Koroshiya no Dai Pinchi" (Japanese: 忍者と殺し屋の大ピンチ)	Shōhei Fujita & Naoaki Shibuta	Yuya Takahashi	June 19, 2025
As a result of her memories as a child coexisting with her normal memories, Konoha starts to act peculiarly around Satoko due to how she cared for her as a child. While going out shopping with Satoko, Konoha receives a warning from her organization that she will face punishment if she continues to avoid taking on new assassination work. After blaming Satoko for messing up her personality and storming off, Konoha tries to stop another ninja assassin named Yukari from getting to Satoko but gets injured after her new memories affect her ability to kill. It is then that Satoko rushes in to save Konoha, managing to drive Yukari away but losing an eye in the process. Needing money to repair Satoko's eye while also appeasing to the organization, Konoha goes overseas to take on some dangerous assassination work, leaving Satoko in Marin's care. While Satoko and Marin go to see Kuro, pondering the reason why Satoko is targeted so much, Konoha, distracted by Satoko not answering her calls due to dropping her phone in the toilet, is caught off guard during her job.
12	"A Ninja and an Assassin Under One Roof"; Transliteration: "Ninja to Koroshiya no Futari Gurashi" (Japanese: 忍者と殺し屋のふたりぐらし)	Yukihiro Miyamoto	Shiyo Hatsumida & Midori Yoshizawa	June 26, 2025
While Minato and Marin experiment with various modifications for Satoko's missing eye, all of which end in failure, Satoko grows concerned over Konoha's lengthy absence, especially after hearing the reason why she took on the job. Later that night, Satoko and Marin are attacked by Yukari, who takes advantage of the limits of Satoko's leafing ninjutsu. However, they are saved by the return of Konoha who, despite losing an arm during her mission, manages to work with Satoko to defeat Yukari. A few days later, after both Konoha and Satoko are healed up by Minato, Konoha tells Marin that she convinced her organization to let her leave her mission early in lieu of payment out of concern for Satoko. Later that day, Konoha confides in Satoko about why she wishes to climb up the assassin rankings, leading to the pair aiming to climb up together. Afterwards, Satoko informs Kuro of how she is doing, Minato continues spending time with Marin, and Satoko and Konoha kill another ninja assassin named Kanon.

== Reception ==
=== Manga ===
The series was nominated for the eighth Next Manga Awards in 2022 in the print category.

=== Anime ===
In the Spring 2025 anime preview guide from Anime News Network, James Beckett said he knew he was going to love the series from the "first scene," while praising the comedic elements, and the "contrast between the lush production values and the deadpan editing," and promised that it would be "a keeper." Caitlin Moore said that while the series "is not going to be a top-shelf SHAFT title" it had "cute and simple" character designs which echo those in Miss Kobayashi's Dragon Maid and noted how the series threw you out of complacency while it played itself like "a yuri-tinged sitcom about a pair of opposites in violent professions." Richard Eisenbeis called the series a "light-hearted yuri rom-com" and also compared it to Miss Kobayashi's Dragon Maid, saying that the hidden feelings of the characters drew them closer, argued that Shaft had "really brought their A-game this time around" and concluded that enjoying the series depends on whether you like yuri and its style of humor. Rebecca Silverman was less positive, saying that the viewer might find it funny if they liked "clumsy ninjas" and grew weary of the dynamic between Konoha and Satoko, saying that the latter was "a combination of a walking disaster and terribly endearing." While she praised Haruna Mikawa, Satoko's voice actress, Silverman concluded that she could not come up with "any particularly strong feelings" about the series, which she called "perfectly adequate."

Eisenbeis reviewed the first two episodes of the series for ANN, saying that while he thought it would a "light-hearted yuri", it was not this at all, with murder jokes, and laughs coming from the "burgeoning relationship between Konoha and Satoko." He also praised the "stunning visuals" and called the episodes "fantastic," and said he could not wait to watch more. Cy Catwell reviewed the first episode for Anime Feminist, giving it warnings for blood and fan service, saying that comedy anime could "often be hit and miss," and said the comedy worked in some senses, but did not have the same charm as The Great Jahy Will Not Be Defeated!. They criticized the "leering shots" toward women in this episode, while noting that the "yuri vibes are strong" but said they were not sure they would watch past the first three episodes.
