= Kenjirō Okada =

Japanese director and storyboard artist

Kenjirō Okada 岡田 堅二朗
- Born: Japan
- Occupations: Director, storyboard artist
- Years active: 2005–present
- Employer: Group TAC (2005–2010)
- Known for: March Comes In like a Lion

Kenjirō Okada (Japanese: 岡田 堅二朗, Hepburn: Okada Kenjirō) is a Japanese director and storyboard artist best known for directing March Comes In like a Lion.

== Career ==
Okada started off in the anime industry as a production assistant for Zoids: Genesis in 2005 at Group TAC. Over several years, Okada worked to this capacity, and in 2007 was promoted to production manager on Nenbutsu Monogatari (released in 2008). Two years later, in 2010, he made his debut as an episode director on episode 124 of Hana Kappa. That year, however, Group TAC filed for bankruptcy, and Okada had a short tenure at Studio CJT (founded by former Group TAC members) as a producer, but that same year became a freelancing director. In 2012, he became associated with Shaft and made his debut with the studio on the 2nd episode of Nekomonogatari: Black. For the next 4 years, he participated in a number of Shaft productions as an episode director and storyboard artist, and in 2016 made his debut as a series director with the studio on March Comes In like a Lion under Akiyuki Shinbo's direction, which received positive reviews from critics. Okada occasionally works with other companies, but a majority of his output continues to be with Shaft.

=== Style ===
In an interview between him and Shaft colleague Hajime Ootani, the two were asked to describe each other's styles and processes as directors. Commenting on his own style, Okada stated that he gave more attention to appealing to fans of the works he was adapting and the original author's expectations, to which Ootani supported and gave admiration for. In 2021, Okada acted as assistant director for Ootani's Pretty Boy Detective Club, and chief director Shinbo stated that Ootani and Okada complimented each other's strengths and weaknesses.

== Works ==
=== Television series ===
In "Director(s)" column highlights Okada's directorial works.

Year	Title	Director(s)	Studio	SB (Note: Storyboard artist)	ED (Note: Episode director, equivalent to unit director)	Other roles and notes	Ref(s)
2005	Zoids: Genesis	Kazunori Mizuno	SMDE	No	No	Production assistant	
2006	Otogi-Jūshi Akazukin	Takaaki Ishiyama	Madhouse	No	No	Production assistant	
2007	Bakugan Battle Brawlers	Mitsuo Hashimoto	TMS Entertainment; Japan Vistec	No	No	Production assistant	
2009	Kimi ni Todoke	Hiro Kaburagi	Production I.G	No	No	In-between animator	
2012	Tsuritama	Kenji Nakamura	A-1 Pictures	No	Yes		
2012	Nekomonogatari: Black	Akiyuki Shinbo; Tomoyuki Itamura (series)	Shaft	No	Yes		
2012	Picchipichi Shizuku-chan	Kazumi Nonaka	Asahi Production	No	No	Producer	
2013	From the New World	Masashi Ishihama	A-1 Pictures	No	Yes		
2013	Sasami-san@Ganbaranai	Akiyuki Shinbo	Shaft	No	Yes		
2013	Monogatari Series Second Season	Akiyuki Shinbo (chief); Tomoyuki Itamura; Naoyuki Tatsuwa (series, #6–9); Yuki Yase (series, #14–17)	Shaft	No	Yes	Assistant episode director 2nd key animator	
2013	Gatchaman Crowds	Kenji Nakamura	Tatsunoko Production	No	Yes		
2014	Buddy Complex	Yasuhiro Tanabe	Sunrise	No	Yes		
2014	Captain Earth	Takuya Igarashi	Bones	No	Yes		
2014	Mekakucity Actors	Akiyuki Shinbo (chief); Yuki Yase	Shaft	No	Yes		
2014	Hanamonogatari	Akiyuki Shinbo (chief); Tomoyuki Itamura	Shaft	No	Yes		
2014	Tsukimonogatari	Akiyuki Shinbo (chief); Tomoyuki Itamura	Shaft	No	Yes		
2015	Nisekoi:	Akiyuki Shinbo (chief); Yukihiro Miyamoto (chief episode)	Shaft	Yes	Yes		
2015	Aria the Scarlet Ammo AA	Takashi Kawabata	Doga Kobo	No	Yes		
2015	Owarimonogatari	Akiyuki Shinbo (chief); Tomoyuki Itamura	Shaft	No	Yes		
2016	March Comes In like a Lion	Akiyuki Shinbo; Kenjirou Okada (series)	Shaft	Yes	Yes		
2017	March Comes In like a Lion 2nd Season	Akiyuki Shinbo; Kenjirou Okada (series)	Shaft	Yes	Yes		
2018	Fate/Extra: Last Encore	Akiyuki Shinbo (chief); Yukihiro Miyamoto (series)	Shaft	No	Yes		
2019	Zoku Owarimonogatari	Akiyuki Shinbo	Shaft	Yes	Yes		
2020	Magia Record: Puella Magi Madoka Magica Side Story	Doroinu (chief); Yukihiro Miyamoto; Kenjirou Okada; Midori Yoshizawa	Shaft	Yes	Yes		
2020	Wave, Listen to Me!	Tatsuma Minamikawa	Sunrise	Yes	No		
2020	Assault Lily Bouquet	Shouji Saeki; Hajime Ootani (chief episode)	Shaft	Yes	Yes		
2021	Pretty Boy Detective Club	Akiyuki Shinbo (chief); Hajime Ootani	Shaft	Yes	Yes	Assistant director	
2022	RWBY: Ice Queendom	Toshimasa Suzuki; Kenjirou Okada (chief)	Shaft	Yes	Yes		
2023	Horimiya: The Missing Pieces	Masashi Ishihama	CloverWorks	Yes	Yes		
2024	Black Butler: Public School Arc	Kenjirou Okada	CloverWorks	Yes	Yes		
2025	Black Butler: Emerald Witch Arc	Kenjirou Okada	CloverWorks	Yes	Yes		
2026	Oshi no Ko 3rd Season	Daisuke Hiramaki	Doga Kobo	Yes	Yes	Color script	

=== OVAs / ONAs ===
Year	Title	Director(s)	Studio	SB (Note: Storyboard artist.)	ED (Note: Episode director, equivalent to unit director.)	Other roles and notes	Ref(s)
2008	Nenbutsu Monogatari	Takashi Ui	Group Tac	No	No	Production manager	
2016	Koyomimonogatari	Akiyuki Shinbo (chief); Tomoyuki Itamura	Shaft	No	Yes		

=== Films ===
Year	Title	Director(s)	Studio	SB	ED	Other roles and notes	Ref(s)
2006	Eien no Hou	Isamu Imakake	Group TAC	No	No	Production assistant	
2020	Josee, the Tiger and the Fish	Kōtarō Tamura	Bones	No	Yes		

=== Video games ===
Year	Title	Studio	Roles and notes	Ref(s)
2017	Magia Record (Arc I)	Shaft	Cutscene director and storyboard artist	

== Notes ==
=== Citations ===
- Aniplex (2021). Pretty Boy Detective Club Vol. 5 Special Booklet. Aniplex.
