= List of Tsukuyomi: Moon Phase episodes =

The following is a list of episodes from the anime adaptation of Tsukuyomi: Moon Phase. The anime series is directed by Akiyuki Shinbo, and was produced by Shaft. Mayori Sekijima was the series composition writer, and Daisaku Kume composed the music. Masahiro Aizawa designed the characters and served as chief animation director, and Shaft animator Kazuhiro Oota acted as chief animation director for the Blu-Ray release of episodes 12 through 15. Oota was also credited as the animation supervisor (an equivalent role to "chief animation director") for episodes 9–10, 20, and the OVA. Four episodes were outsourced outside of Shaft: episodes 8, 14, and 20 to Studio Pastoral; and episode 23 to Nomad. (Note: Outsourcing studios credited in the ending to their respective episodes as Production Assistance (制作協力).)

No.	Title	Directed by (Note: Information is taken from the ending credits of each episode.)	Written by	Storyboarded by	Original release date
1	"Big Brother, Be My Slave"; Transliteration: "Onii-sama, Watashi no Shimobe ni Narinasai♥" (Japanese: おにいさま、私のシモベになりなさい♥)	Shin Oonuma	Kenichi Kanemaki	Akiyuki Shinbo (Note: Uncredited.)	October 5, 2004
Photographer Kohei Morioka investigates a haunted castle in Germany with his cousin Seiji and co-worker Hiromi. Kohei meets a mysterious girl named Hazuki, who lives in the castle. Her guardian Vigo attacks, but Seiji draws his attention. Hazuki gives Kohei a kiss, which is actually her sinking her fangs into his neck.
2	"Call Me Mistress"; Transliteration: "Go-shujin-sama to Oyobinasai♥" (Japanese: 御主人様とおよびなさい♥)	Toshimasa Suzuki	Mayori Sekijima	Jou Tanaka	October 12, 2004
Hazuki bites Kohei, but to her shock he is not turned into her servant. Despite her annoyance, Hazuki convinces Kohei to destroy the crystal powering Vigo and the barrier keeping her trapped. Seiji manages to wound Vigo, allowing Kohei to smash the crystal. Hazuki vanishes at daybreak, leaving Kohei to think she was a ghost. However, upon returning home, Hazuki is there! His grandfather Ryuhei takes her in, despite knowing she's a vampire.
3	"Big Brother, Let's Live Together"; Transliteration: "Onii-sama, Atashi to Issho ni Kurashite Kudasai ne♥" (Japanese: おにいさま、私といっしょに暮らしてくださいね♥)	Nobuyuki Takeuchi	Kenichi Kanemaki	Nobuyuki Takeuchi	October 19, 2004
Hazuki is revealed to have hypnotized airport workers to get to Japan in a flashback. She ended up trapped in the castle two years after her mother left without explaining. In the present day, Hazuki refuses to accept her bite didn't work on Kohei. Ryuhei allows her to stay as a housekeeper. Hazuki tells Kohei where she used to live with her mother, having to ride in the trunk of his car to avoid sunlight. Once there, they find a cat that leads them to an apparition of Hazuki's mother. It promises the real one will come to find Hazuki.
4	"Big Brother, I Feel Like Kissing"; Transliteration: "Onii-sama, ...Kisu Shitakunacchatta♥" (Japanese: おにいさま、...キスしたくなっちゃた♥)	Yasuo Ejima	Kenichci Kanemaki	Toshimasa Suzuki	October 26, 2004
A new full moon arrives, with Hazuki waking up feeling odd; she wonders if she's ill. However, later that night, Hazuki surprises Kohei, explaining that she's realized why she's feeling odd; her vampiric thirst gets roused by the full moon. After being refused a drink, Hazuki leaves to find someone else to bite. Kohei tracks her down, only to be beaten up by delinquents. An angry Hazuki chases them off and bites an unconscious Kohei.
5	"Big Brother, It's a Full Full Full Moon"; Transliteration: "Onii-sama, Furufurufurumūn♥" (Japanese: おにいさま、ふるふるふるむーん♥)	Kunitoshi Okajima	Sumio Uetake	Osamu Tadokoro	November 2, 2004
Hazuki and Kohei meet the vampiress Elfriede, who has been sent by her master Count Kinkel to convince Hazuki to return to the castle. However, Elfriede changes her mind upon seeing Hazuki's bite doesn't turn Kohei into her slave. Instead Elfriede decides to do overt surveillance to understand what is going on; having a hunch how this "slave immunity" thing works.
6	"Heart Throbs in Kyoto"; Transliteration: "Onii-sama to Kyoto de ...ufu♥ Wakuwaku♥♥" (Japanese: おにいさまと京都で...うふ♥ わくわく♥♥)	Tatsuya Oishi	Mayori Sekijima	Michio Fukuda	November 9, 2004
Hazuki joins Kohei, Seiji and Hiromi on a work trip to Kyoto; Ryuhei joins them to visit family. Unfortunately, Hikaru and Kaoru, Kohei and Seiji's second cousins and their respective fiancés, perceive Hazuki as a threat due to bring a vampire. Elfriede follows and bites Kohei, getting Hazuki blamed. Come sunrise, a collective effort by Ryuhei, Seiji and Kohei to save Hazuki from sunlight gets Kaoru to back off. Hazuki gets a new friend in the form of a shikigami familiar named Haiji.
7	"Well, I Wanted It..."; Transliteration: "......Datte Hoshikattandamon♥" (Japanese: ......だって欲しかったんだもん♥)	Shin Oonuma	Kenichi Kanemaki	Shin Oonuma	November 16, 2004
Tired of being sore from her sleeping arrangement (a tatami bed), Hazuki hypnotizes Hiromi into getting her a bed. Kohei scolds Hazuki for not trying to ask normally and accept the results. Hazuki decides to ask Hiromi for a pillow, being shocked when she receives it and learns she's considered her friend.
8	"Mother Came to See Me! Happy!"; Transliteration: "Kaa-sama ga Kitekureta! Ureshii♥" (Japanese: 母様がきてくれた! うれしい♥)	Junichi Yokoyama (Note: Home release version directed by Ryouki Kamitsubo.)	Hiroaki Kitajima	Osamu Tadokoro	November 23, 2004
Hazuki is lured into a trap by Count Kinkel, being put to sleep until Luna is given control of her body again. Kohei and Ryhei track her to an art exhibit run by the Count, finding Hazuki's old guard from the castle and Elfreide blocking their way. However, Elfriede destroys her ally, revealing she was freed of Kinkel"s control when she bit Kohei; he is the Vampires Lover, whose blood breaks formerly human vampires free from servitude to the one who turned them.
9	"Save Me From This Dream"; Transliteration: "Onii-sama, Atashi wo Yume kara Tasukete... Onegai" (Japanese: おにいさま、私を夢から助けて...おねがい)	Tomoya Kunisaki (Note: Home release version directed by Shin Oonuma.)	Tomoyasu Ookubo	Osamu Tadokoro	November 30, 2004
With Elfriede on their side, Kohei rushes to Hazuki while Count Kinkel is kept busy. Unfortunately, the Count's spell puts Hazuki into a trance that allows Luna to take control. Having dealt with Ryuhei and Elfriede, Kinkel orders Luna to kill Kohei; she stabs him in the chest. However, the smell of his blood makes Luna bite him; his blood brings Hazuki back to her senses. Seiji finally arrives and teams up with Ryuhei, forcing Kinkel to retreat with Elfriede captive. Kohei is rushed to the hospital.
10	"You're My Slave and I won't Forgive You"; Transliteration: "Yurusanai... Hajimete no Shimobe no Kuse ni" (Japanese: ゆるさない...初めてのシモベのくせに)	Mitsuhiro Yoneda	Tomoyasu Ookubo	Mitsuhiro Yoneda	December 7, 2004
Kohei is at death's door, with Seiji blaming Hazuki (despite it being Kinkel's fault via mind control). Ryuhei, Kaoru and Hikaru assist Seiji in a ritual to help draw Kohei's spirit back from the edge. Not wanting to lose him, Hazuki hears her mother's voice (from Haiji) tell her how to save him. Hazuki bites Kohei, giving part of her life energy to heal him.
11	"Big Brother, Get Some Rest!"; Transliteration: "Onii-sama, Ansei ni Shitenakya Dame♥" (Japanese: おにいさま、安静にしてなきゃダメ♥)	Toshimasa Suzuki	Kenichi Kanemaki	Michio Fukuda	December 14, 2004
Since his near-death experience, Kohei is being constantly fussed over by Hazuki, who wants to ensure he finishes recovering in peace.
12	"I'll Never Forgive Him!"; Transliteration: "Yurusenai no, Aitsu Dake wa...!" (Japanese: ゆるせないの、あいつだけは...!)	Tatsuya Oishi	Hiroaki Kitajima	Hiroto Katou	December 21, 2004
Ryuhei is kidnapped by Kinkel via a brainwashed Hiromi. They are lured to a mansion where Kinkel uses illusions to separate them. Failing to kill them, Kinkel tricks Seiji into attacking Kohei. However, Hazuki drinks some of Kohei's blood to power up; she uses her magic to gather exorcism material they brought into a cross blast that sends Kinkel into the daylight. They find Ryuhei outside, but Elfriede warns them of a nasty trick the count still had.
13	"Let's Defeat the Count!"; Transliteration: "Onii-sama, Minna de Hakushaku wo Taoshimashō ne♥" (Japanese: おにいさま、みんなで伯爵を倒しましょうね♥)	Hiroto Katou (Note: Home release version directed by Yasuo Ejima.)	Tomoyasu Ookubo	Hiroto Katou	December 28, 2004
Kinkel is revealed to have the ability to go in daylight, thanks his ability to manipulate light so it never touches him; as a result, he turns invisible. Despite the group's best efforts, they cannot wound the Count to make lose focus on repelling the light. Kinkel strangles Kohei on a balcony, forcing Hazuki to risk herself by running into sunlight to stab him with a stake; however, she doesn't burn. Exposed to sunlight via his wound, Elfriede attacks Kinkel with her bats until he burns to death.
14	"Big Brother, Will You Walk with Me?"; Transliteration: "Onii-sama to Issho ni...... Osanpo shitai desu♥" (Japanese: おにいさまといっしょに......お散歩したいです♥)	Ryouki Kamitsubo	Hiroaki Kitajima	Osamu Tadokoro	January 11, 2005
After the defeat of Kinkel, it's confirmed Hazuki is a true daywalker (she doesn't need any tricks to avoid sunlight; it doesn't burn her); it's the reason she was kept prisoner in the castle, to keep other vampires from finding out and trying to drink her blood to gain her power. As a bright side, Hiromi and the editor in chief are free of Kinkel's control, but lack memory of their time under his control.
15	"It's More Than a Responsibility!"; Transliteration: "Onii-sama, "Sekinin"-totte Kudasai ne♥" (Japanese: おにいさま、"せきにん"とってくださいね♥)	Shin Oonuma	Tomoyasu Ookubo	Shin Oonuma	January 18, 2005
Hazuki is persuaded by her Luna personality to search for a new slave to feed on due to her fight with Kohei. Kohei manages to make amends with Hazuki, allowing her to erase Luna from her mind.
16	"I Have to Eat Cat-Ear Buns!"; Transliteration: "Onii-sama, Doushitemo Furufurudou no Nekomimi Manju Janakucha Dame nandesu♥" (Japanese: おにいさま、どうしてもふるふる堂のネコミミ饅頭じゃなくちゃだめなんです♥)	Yutaka Hirata	Kenichi Kanemaki	Michio Fukuda	January 25, 2005
Hazuki and Haiji try capturing birds that stole her snacks. Kohei takes her out camping afterwards, taking pictures of her. One of them is of Hazuki standing against the starry sky, which has a mystic feel to it; Hiromi decides to use it for the magazine cover.
17	"Big Brother, Why Is This Happening?"; Transliteration: "Onii-sama, Nande Konna Koto ni Naruwake?" (Japanese: おにいさま、なんでこんなことになるわけ!?)	Keizō Kusakawa	Kenichi Kanemaki	Keizō Kusakawa	February 1, 2005
Another vampire tracks down Hazuki, thanks to Hiromi's blunder in using Hazuki's picture. Ryuhei and Elfriede hold him off as the antique store burns down from the fight. Kohei and Hazuki escape.
18	"Yahoo! I'll See You Soon!"; Transliteration: "Yahho♥ Haiho♥ Ima, Ai ni Yukimasu ne♥" (Japanese: ヤッホー♥ ハイホー♥ 今、会いに行きますネ♥)	Yoshinari Saitou	Tomoyasu Ookubo	Michio Fukuda	February 8, 2005
Kohei and Hazuki have moved into the temple of an acquaintance of Ryuhei in order to train Kohei as an exorcist. Hazuki deals with the sisters from Kyoto, whom guard her (reluctantly) for the time being.
19	"Day on the Mountain, Monkey in the Spa, the Cat's Whiskers... And Who Are You?"; Transliteration: "Oyama no Hi Yukemuri no Saru Neko no Hige ...de, Antatachi Dare?" (Japanese: お山の日 湯けむりのサル ねこのヒゲ♥ ...で、あんたたち誰?)	Ryouki Kamitsubo	Kenichi Kanemaki	Osamu Tadokoro	February 15, 2005
Hazuki's younger half sister Artemis is sent with her servants Vargas and Jeda to track her down. Arte is doing this reluctantly, as she hates "Luna" for being their father's favorite; unaware that Hazuki is nothing to him aside from her daywalker power.
20	"Grandfather, Why Are You Dressed Like That?"; Transliteration: "Ojii-sama, Doshite sonna Kakkō shiterun desuka?" (Japanese: おじいさま、どーしてそんな格好してるんですか?)	Shin Oonuma	Hiroaki Kitajima	Toshimasa Suzuki	February 22, 2005
While out training, Kohei has a near-fatal fall from a cliff that leaves most of his bones broken and him unable to move. While waiting for Hazuki to come heal his injuries, Kohei notices a masked figure resembling his grandfather.
21	"Big Brother, Where Is This Nursery Rhyme From?"; Transliteration: "Onii-sama, Sorette Doko no Chihō no Temari Uta?" (Japanese: おにいさま、それってどこの地方の手まり唄?)	Mitsuhiro Yoneda	Mayori Sekijima	Mitsuhiro Yoneda	March 1, 2005
Kohei is found and healed by Arte.
22	"I Didn't Know You Were Like That!"; Transliteration: "Onii-sama, Sonna Hito dattandesuka!?" (Japanese: おにいさま、そんな人だったんですか!?)	Keizō Kusakawa	Kenichi Kanemaki	Osamu Tadokoro	March 8, 2005
Kohei asks the seal on his exorcism powers to be released. The condition of this is that he cannot see Hazuki until he masters his power. After days of not seeing each other, the two decide to disobey the order by thinking up a hypothetical excuse. They immediate come to regret it when they learn why this restriction was put in place.
23	"Big Brother, Am I That Scary?"; Transliteration: "Onii-sama, Watashitte Sonna ni Hen desuka?" (Japanese: おにいさま、わたしってそんなにヘンですか?)	Toshimasa Suzuki	Tomoyasu Ookubo	Michio Fukuda	March 15, 2005
Hazuki learns Kohei's powers cause him to see her frightening vampiric lineage; thus he screams at the sight of her. As a result, Hazuki had no choice but to go to Jeda in exchange for Hikaru's life. To everyone's surprise, the castle that served as her prison in Germany appears; Jeda reveals that the two are linked.
24	"Good-bye Big Brother... I'm Going Back? I'm Really Going Back?"; Transliteration: "Sayonara, Onii-sama...... Watashi, Honto ni Kaecchau yo? Kaecchau yo?" (Japanese: サヨナラ、おにいさま......私、ホントに帰っちゃうよ? 帰っちゃうよ?)	Shin Oonuma	Hiroaki Kitajima	Michio Fukuda	March 22, 2005
Jeda takes Kinkel and Vigo's places as Hazuki's warden; he recreates the pendant that turns Hazuki into Luna. However, Elfriede and Ryuhei combine their powers to keep the castle from leaving, allowing the cavalry to rush in. Jeda attacks blindly, killing Vargas and leaving Arte in shock. Kouhei arrives with his powers mastered, combining his powers with Hazuki's to kill Jeda once and for all; the result is a blinding flash of light.
25	"Big Brother, They Say It's The End! Will You Always Be My Slave?"; Transliteration: "Onii-sama, Saishūkai dasō desuyo♥ Zutto Watashi no Shimobe de Itekudasai ne♥♥♥" (Japanese: おにいさま、最終回だそうですよ♥ ずっと私のシモベでいてくださいね♥♥♥)	Tatsuya Oishi	Kenichi Kanemaki	Tatsuya Oishi	March 29, 2005
Jeda is dead and everything goes back to normal, with Ryuhei's antique shop rebuilt. For the sake of their relationship, Kouhei had his powers sealed again. Hazuki is worried about Arte, who vanished after the battle;since Arte has no-one to look after her. At the party to celebrate the reopening, Seiji brings Arte, who will be living with Hazuki from now on. Kohei also gets Hazuki to admit her mother is gone.
26 (OVA)	"Up and Down, In the Sun, Floating Away... What Is It?"; Transliteration: "Onii-sama, Yurayura Kirakira Donburako Korette, Nānda?" (Japanese: おにいさま、ゆらゆらきらきらどんぶらこ これって、なーんだ?)	Koutarou Tamura	Kenichi Kanemaki	Nobuyuki Takeuchi	February 22, 2006
The house is out at sea, with only Seiji freaking out; he realizes the laws of physics are being ignored, the house should sink not float. The story focuses on Hazuki bonding with Arte.
