= Hisaharu Iijima =

Japanese art director

Hisaharu Iijima 飯島 寿治
- Occupations: Art director, artist
- Years active: 1986–present
- Employer(s): Studio Easter (1986–2004); Ryuubidou (CEO, 2004–present); Shaft (2020–present)
- Website: https://ryubido.jp

Hisaharu Iijima (Japanese: 飯島 寿治, Hepburn: Iijima Hisaharu) (Note: Sometimes misromanized as "Toshiharu Iijima.") is a Japanese art director, background artist, and CEO of art studio Ryuubidou (竜美堂).

== Early life ==
During high school, Iijima did watercolor and oil painting and decided to go to a vocational school where he found that he liked to paint landscapes and backgrounds. He became a fan of Rembrandt and wanted to paint with expressive light and shadows similar to him.

== Career ==
Iijima worked in the anime industry as a background artist at art company Studio Easter in 1986. In 2003, he was promoted to the role of art director and given responsibilities for Gad Guard and Le Portrait de Petit Cossette (2004) alongside studio representative Junichi Higashi under the collective pseudonym "Easter Princess Group" (イースター姫組), as well as Uta Kata on his own. That year, Iijima left Studio Easter and formed his own company, Ryuubidou, in June. For the next few years, he and his studio worked on a number of series until the director of Le Portrait de Petit Cossette, Akiyuki Shinbo, by then basing himself out of studio Shaft, heard that Iijima had formed his own studio and decided to ask him to be the art director for the studio's upcoming Hidamari Sketch series that was in pre-production. Shinbo considered Iijima to be a key artist responsible for the core foundations of Hidamari Sketch alongside (at the time) art designer Tatsuya Oishi and chief director Ryouki Kamitsubo throughout its run, even as the latter two were no longer involved in its later seasons. From that point on, Iijima worked mainly with Shinbo and Shaft's productions while occasionally taking on jobs elsewhere. He took over the role of art director for Sayonara, Zetsubou-Sensei in its first OVA series and third season, and in 2009 was the art director for Oishi and Shinbo's Bakemonogatari, a work considered to have pushed Shaft "into fame."

Regarding the style of Bakemonogatari, visual director Nobuyuki Takeuchi had interest in the photography works of Sadahiro Koizumi and had shown Shinbo and Oishi; as they liked the idea, Shinbo told Iijima to keep the photographs in mind while working on Monogatari, and Takeuchi asked Iijima to stick closely to the photos where possible. Iijima also found it interesting to paint both foreground objects and parts of the backgrounds with solid white colors and white gradients which became a staple of the series' art direction even through seasons he was not in charge of. He approached the background painting with a relatively 'ordinary' color scheme at first which changed when Oishi made certain corrections. Alongside his other Shaft works and occasional works to other production houses, Iijima continued as the art director for Hidamari Sketch until its final release in 2013 and Monogatari until 2014. By that time, with Hanamonogatari, Iijima was joined by art director Ken Naitou from Studio Tulip who would take over as art director for the succeeding television works of the series while Iijima focused his and Ryuubidou's efforts on the Kizumonogatari film trilogy. He thought that Naitou might have been intimated when he took over his responsibilities, but felt relieved seeing Naitou's work on Owarimonogatari (2015) and that he could continue to make interesting pictures that even he couldn't. Kizumonogatari had a very different approach to the rest of the Monogatari series, however, as director Oishi was adamant about using live-action photography for all of the shots of the sky and using 3DCG for most of the buildings and environmental shots besides the close-ups. Since the overall artistic direction heavily leaned on the 3D backgrounds, Iijima even joked about whether or not he'd lose his job on the film.

Following Kizumonogatari, Iijima was the art director for Stan Lee and Hiroshi Nagahama's The Reflection (2017) at Studio Deen, as well as Takeuchi and Shinbo's Fireworks (2017) at Shaft. He continued to contribute background art through Ryuubidou for the next several years, but did not take on another job as art director until 2021 with a promotional short for the Bakemonogatari manga adaptation. By then, much of the Ryuubidou staff had left and Shaft founded its own art department with Iijima taking on the role of technical advisor at the studio. In 2023, director Hiroshi Nishikiori, whom Iijima had worked with several times in the 2000s, made a direct request to Iijima for a screen background to be used in Idolish 7 the Movie. Although busy with other work, Iijima accepted the request and ultimately drew two and a half screen backgrounds. The next year, he returned as the art director for the Monogatari franchise with Off & Monster Season.

== Works ==
=== Television series ===
Year	Title	Director(s)	Studio	Art director	Background artist	Other roles and notes	Ref(s)
1994	Mobile Fighter G Gundam	Yasuhiro Imagawa	Sunrise	Junichi Higashi	Yes		
1995	El Hazard: The Wanderers	Katsuhito Akiyama	AIC	Shigemi Ikeda	Yes		
1996	City Hunter: The Secret Service	Kenji Kodama	Sunrise	Junichi Higashi	Yes		
1996	The Vision of Escaflowne	Kazuki Akane	Sunrise	Junichi Higashi	Yes		
1998	Cowboy Bebop	Shinichiro Watanabe	Sunrise	Junichi Higashi	Yes		
1998	Neo Ranga	Toshiyuki Tsuru (25–48)	Pierrot	Yuuji Ikeda	Yes		
1998	Gasaraki	Ryōsuke Takahashi	Sunrise	Shigemi Ikeda	Yes		
1999	Starship Girl Yamamoto Yohko	Akiyuki Shinbo	J.C. Staff	Junichi Higashi	Yes		
1999	Excel Saga	Shinichi Watanabe	J.C. Staff	Junichi Higashi	Yes		
2000	Descendants of Darkness	Hiroko Tokita	J.C. Staff	Junichi Higashi	Yes		
2001	The SoulTaker	Akiyuki Shinbo	Tatsunoko Production; Tatsunoko VCR	Junichi Higashi	Yes		
2002	Ai Yori Aoshi	Masami Shimoda	J.C. Staff	Junichi Higashi	Yes		
2002	The Twelve Kingdoms	Tsuneo Kobayashi	Pierrot	Junichi Higashi	Yes		
2002	Saikano	Mitsuko Kase	Gonzo	Junichi Higashi; Toshihiro Kohama	Yes		
2003	Stratos 4	Takeshi Mori	Studio Fantasia	"Princess Group"	Yes		
2003	Gad Guard	Hiroshi Nishikiori	Gonzo; Amber Film Works	Junichi Higashi; Hisaharu Iijima	No		
2004	Uta Kata	Keiji Gotoh	Hal Film Maker	Hisaharu Iijima	No		
2005	Oku-sama wa Mahō Shōjo: Bewitched Agnes	Hiroshi Nishikiori	J.C. Staff	Chikako Shibata	Yes		
2005	Canvas 2: Akane-iro no Palette	Itsuro Kawasaki	Zexcs	Ayumi Kondou	Yes		
2006	The Good Witch of the West	Katsuichi Nakayama	Hal Film Maker	Hisaharu Iijima	Yes		
2006	Kemonozume	Masaaki Yuasa	Madhouse	Ryou Kouno	Yes		
2006	Yoake Mae yori Ruriiro na	Masahiko Ohta	Daume	Hisaharu Iijima	Yes		
2007	Hidamari Sketch	Akiyuki Shinbo; Ryouki Kamitsubo	Shaft	Hisaharu Iijima	No		
2007	Shattered Angels	Tetsuya Yanagisawa	TNK	Hisaharu Iijima	No		
2008	Hidamari Sketch x 365	Akiyuki Shinbo	Shaft	Hisaharu Iijima	No		
2008	Someday's Dreamers II: Sora	Osamu Kobayashi	Hal Film Maker	Hisaharu Iijima	No		
2009	Zan Sayonara, Zetsubou-Sensei	Akiyuki Shinbo; Yukihiro Miyamoto	Shaft	Hisaharu Iijima	No		
2009	Maria Holic	Akiyuki Shinbo; Yukihiro Miyamoto	Shaft	Hisaharu Iijima	No		
2009	Bakemonogatari	Akiyuki Shinbo; Tatsuya Oishi	Shaft	Hisaharu Iijima	No		
2010	Hidamari Sketch x Hoshimittsu	Akiyuki Shinbo; Kenichi Ishikura	Shaft	Hisaharu Iijima	No		
2010	And Yet the Town Moves	Akiyuki Shinbo	Shaft	Hisaharu Iijima	No		
2011	Maria Holic Alive	Akiyuki Shinbo; Tomokazu Tokoro	Shaft	Hisaharu Iijima	No		
2011	Hidamari Sketch x Special	Akiyuki Shinbo	Shaft	Hisaharu Iijima	No		
2012	Nisemonogatari	Akiyuki Shinbo; Tomoyuki Itamura	Shaft	Hisaharu Iijima	No		
2012	Hidamari Sketch x Honeycomb	Akiyuki Shinbo; Yuki Yase	Shaft	Hisaharu Iijima	No		
2012	Nekomonogatari: Black	Akiyuki Shinbo; Tomoyuki Itamura	Shaft	Hisaharu Iijima	No		
2013	Monogatari Series Second Season	Akiyuki Shinbo; Tomoyuki Itamura; Naoyuki Tatsuwa; Yuki Yase	Shaft	Hisaharu Iijima	No		
2014	Mekakucity Actors	Akiyuki Shinbo; Yuki Yase	Shaft	Hisaharu Iijima	No	Art board	
2014	Hanamonogatari	Akiyuki Shinbo; Tomoyuki Itamura	Shaft	Hisaharu Iijima; Ken Naitou	No		
2014	Wolf Girl and Black Prince	Ken'ichi Kasai	TYO Animations	Hisaharu Iijima	No		
2014	Tsukimonogatari	Akiyuki Shinbo; Tomoyuki Itamura	Shaft	Ken Naitou	No	Background art assistance	
2015	Owarimonogatari	Akiyuki Shinbo; Tomoyuki Itamura	Shaft	Ken Naitou	No	Background art assistance	
2017	The Reflection	Hiroshi Nagahama; Kouichirou Sohtome	Studio Deen	Hisaharu Iijima	No		
2017	March Comes In like a Lion 2nd Season	Akiyuki Shinbo; Kenjirou Okada	Shaft	Seiki Tamura	Yes		
2019	Zoku Owarimonogatari	Akiyuki Shinbo	Shaft	Ken Naitou	No	Background art assistance	
2020	Magia Record	Doroinu; Yukihiro Miyamoto; Kenjirou Okada; Midori Yoshizawa	Shaft	Ken Naitou	Yes		
2021	Magia Record: The Eve of Awakening	Doroinu; Yukihiro Miyamoto	Shaft	Ken Naitou	Yes		
2022	RWBY: Ice Queendom	Toshimasa Suzuki; Kenjirou Okada	Shaft	Ken Naitou	Yes	Art board	
2023	The Café Terrace and Its Goddesses	Satoshi Kuwabara	Tezuka Productions	Masami Saitou	No	Background art manager	
2023	Zom 100: Bucket List of the Dead	Kazuki Kawagoe	Bug Films	Taketo Gonpei	Yes		
2025	A Ninja and an Assassin Under One Roof	Yukihiro Miyamoto	Shaft	Hisaharu Iijima	Yes		

=== OVAs/ONAs ===
Year	Title	Director(s)	Studio	Art director	Background artist	Other roles and notes	Ref(s)
1989	Ano Ko ni 1000%	Harumi Izawa	Visual 80	Sadako Minamisawa	Yes		
1989	Megazone 23: Part III	Shinji Aramaki	Artmic; AIC	Junichi Higashi	Yes		
1990	YJ Ban Lemon Angel	Tetsurō Amino	MI	Junichi Higashi	Yes		
1991	Mobile Suit Gundam 0083: Stardust Memory	Mitsuko Kase; Takashi Imanishi	Sunrise	Junichi Higashi	Yes		
1992	Giant Robo: The Day the Earth Stood Still	Yasuhiro Imagawa	Mu Animation Studio	Masanori Kikuchi (2)	Yes		
1994	Future GPX Cyber Formula Zero	Mitsuo Fukuda	Sunrise	Shigemi Ikeda	Yes		
1995	Sotsugyou: Graduation	Katsuhiko Nakajima	Studio Fantasia	Junichi Higashi	Yes		
1999	Tenamonya Voyagers	Akiyuki Shinbo	Pierrot	Junichi Higashi	Yes		
2001	Puni Puni Poemy	Shinichi Watanabe	J.C. Staff	Junichi Higashi	Yes		
2001	Alien Nine	Jirou Fujimoto; Yasuhiro Irie	J.C. Staff	Junichi Higashi	Yes		
2004	Le Portrait de Petit Cossette	Akiyuki Shinbo	Daume	Junichi Higashi; Hisaharu Iijima	Yes	"Easter Princess Group"	
2008	Yotsunoha	Hiroshi Nishikiori	Hal Film Maker	Hisaharu Iijima	No		
2008	Goku Sayonara, Zetsubou-Sensei	Akiyuki Shinbo; Yukihiro Miyamoto	Shaft	Hisaharu Iijima	No		
2009	Zan Sayonara, Zetsubou-Sensei Bangaichi	Akiyuki Shinbo; Yukihiro Miyamoto	Shaft	Hisaharu Iijima	No		
2011	Katteni Kaizō	Akiyuki Shinbo; Naoyuki Tatsuwa	Shaft	Hisaharu Iijima	No		
2012	Mahou Tsukai Nara Miso wo Kue!	Makoto Bessho	AIC	Hisaharu Iijima	No		
2013	Hidamari Sketch: Sae & Hino's Graduation Arc	Akiyuki Shinbo; Yuki Yase	Shaft	Hisaharu Iijima	No		
2016	Koyomimonogatari	Akiyuki Shinbo; Tomoyuki Itamura	Shaft	Ken Naitou	No	Background art assistance	
2021	Bakemonogatari Special Shaft PV	Akiyuki Shinbo	Shaft	Hisaharu Iijima	No		
2024	Monogatari Series Off & Monster Season	Akiyuki Shinbo; Midori Yoshizawa	Shaft	Hisaharu Iijima	Yes		

=== Films ===
Year	Title	Director(s)	Studio	Art director	Background artist	Other roles and notes	Ref(s)
1986	Gall Force: Eternal Story	Katsuhito Akiyama	AIC	Junichi Higashi	Yes		
1986	They Were Eleven	Satoshi Dezaki; Tsuneo Tominaga	Magic Bus	Junichi Higashi	Yes		
1989	City Hunter: .357 Magnum	Kenji Kodama	Sunrise	Junichi Higashi	Yes		
1989	Akuma-kun	Junichi Sato	Toei Animation	Junichi Higashi	Yes		
1990	City Hunter: Bay City Wars	Kenji Kodama	Sunrise	Junichi Higashi	Yes		
2000	Escaflowne	Kazuki Akane	Bones	Junichi Higashi	Yes		
2007	Sword of the Stranger	Masahiro Andou (director)	Bones	Atsushi Morikawa	Yes		
2016	Kizumonogatari I: Tekketsu	Akiyuki Shinbo; Tatsuya Oishi	Shaft	Hisaharu Iijima	No		
2016	Kizumonogatari II: Nekketsu	Akiyuki Shinbo; Tatsuya Oishi	Shaft	Hisaharu Iijima	No		
2017	Kizumonogatari III: Reiketsu	Akiyuki Shinbo; Tatsuya Oishi	Shaft	Hisaharu Iijima	No		
2017	Fireworks	Akiyuki Shinbo; Nobuyuki Takeuchi	Shaft	Hisaharu Iijima	No		
2026	Puella Magi Madoka Magica: Walpurgisnacht: Rising	Akiyuki Shinbo; Yukihiro Miyamoto	Shaft	Ken Naitou; Shuuichi Kusamori	No	Art board	

== Notes ==
=== Book citations ===
- Kizawa, Yukito; Nakamoto, Muneo; Yanagi, Yuuichi, eds. (2008). Hidamari Sketch Album. Houbunsha. ISBN 978-4832277403.
- Kizawa, Yukito, ed. (2013). ひだまりスケッチデイズ -TVアニメ公式ガイドブック- [Hidamari Sketch Days: TV Anime Official Guidebook]. Houbunsha. ISBN 978-4832277403.
- Kushida, Makoto, ed. (2017). 〈物語〉Febri ["Monogatari" Febri] (in Japanese). Ichijinsha. ASIN B075QWP3NZ.
- Takahashi, Yumi, ed. (2019). Akiyuki Shimbo x Shaft Chronicle (in Japanese). Dotcom. ISBN 978-4835457017.
