= Kizumonogatari =

Japanese anime film series

- Promotional poster for the first film, Tekketsu

傷物語
- Anime film series

Tekketsu; Nekketsu; Reiketsu
- Directed by: Akiyuki Shinbo (Note: Chief Director (総監督, Sō Kantoku).); Tatsuya Oishi
- Produced by: Atsuhiro Iwakami (Aniplex); Takuya Matsushita (Kodansha); Mitsutoshi Kubota (Shaft)
- Written by: Akiyuki Shinbo (Note: Screenplay Composition (脚本構成)); Shaft (Note: Credited as Fuyashi Tō.); Yukito Kizawa (Note: Screenplay Work (脚本制作)); Muneo Nakamoto
- Music by: Satoru Kōsaki
- Studio: Shaft
- Licensed by: BI: MVM Entertainment; NA: Aniplex of America
- Released: January 8, 2016; August 19, 2016; January 6, 2017
- Runtime: 64 minutes; 69 minutes; 83 minutes
- Anime film

Koyomi Vamp
- Directed by: Tatsuya Oishi
- Produced by: Tatsuya Ishikawa
- Written by: Tatsuya Oishi; Yukito Kizawa; Muneo Nakamoto
- Music by: Satoru Kōsaki
- Studio: Shaft
- Licensed by: Crunchyroll
- Released: January 12, 2024
- Runtime: 144 minutes

Kizumonogatari (Japanese: 傷物語; "Wound Story") is a Japanese anime film trilogy directed by Akiyuki Shinbo and Tatsuya Oishi and produced by Shaft. Together, the films are an adaptation of the 2008 light novel of the same name, which is the second entry in the Monogatari series written by Nisio Isin and a prequel to the first, Bakemonogatari.

The first film, Kizumonogatari Part 1: Tekketsu (傷物語I 鉄血篇, Kizumonogatari I: Tekketsu-hen; "Iron-Blooded"), was released in Japanese theaters in January 2016. The second film, Kizumonogatari Part 2: Nekketsu (傷物語II 熱血篇, Kizumonogatari II: Nekketsu-hen; "Hot-Blooded"), was released in August 2016, and the third and final film, Kizumonogatari Part 3: Reiketsu (傷物語III 冷血篇, Kizumonogatari III: Reiketsu-hen; "Cold-Blooded"), was released in January 2017. A compilation film, Kizumonogatari: Koyomi Vamp (傷物語 こよみヴァンプ), was released in January 2024.

== Plot ==
=== Tekketsu ===
Koyomi Araragi, a third-year high school student at Naoetsu High School, befriends Tsubasa Hanekawa, the top honors student at his school. Tsubasa mentions a rumor about a "blonde vampire" that has been sighted around their town recently. Koyomi, who is usually anti-social, takes a liking to Tsubasa's down-to-earth personality. That evening, Koyomi encounters this rumored vampire: she is Kiss-Shot Acerola-Orion Heart-Under-Blade, also known as the "King of Apparitions." The blonde, golden-eyed vampire cries out for Koyomi to save her as she lies in a pool of her own blood, all four of her limbs having been cut off by three vampire hunters. Kiss-Shot asks Koyomi to give her his blood in order to save her life, and when he does, Koyomi finds himself reborn as her vampire subordinate, but Kiss-Shot is now in the form of a child. Koyomi truly wants to become a human again and not stay a vampire. He asks Kiss-Shot how he can revert himself, and she answers that he has to find all of her limbs that were cut by her killers.

=== Nekketsu ===
Now a vampire, Koyomi is charged with retrieving Kiss-shot's severed limbs from the vampire hunters who took them. Before he confronts the first hunter, the gigantic full-vampire Dramaturgy, he has a conversation with Tsubasa. He hides his vampire nature, but Tsubasa is still interested in the rumors about vampires being spread around. At the fight, Dramaturgy tears Koyomi's arms off in one blow, but Koyomi discovers his vampire power of rapid regeneration. Seeing the fight as lost, Dramaturgy surrenders Kiss-Shot's leg to Koyomi. At the time, Kiss-Shot had taken the form of a child. But she morphs into a young teenager after she consumes her adult leg.

Koyomi next fights the vampire-human half-breed Episode, who can transform into mist and wields a giant silver cross as a weapon. Tsubasa walks into the fight and is disemboweled by Episode. Before she dies, Tsubasa points out to Koyomi that he can defeat Episode by throwing sand into his mist form. Koyomi uses sand to overwhelm Episode and strangle him into unconsciousness. Meme Oshino, an ally of Kiss-Shot, gets Koyomi to calm down and, for a price of ¥3 million, informs Koyomi that he can use his own blood to heal Tsubasa. Koyomi then uses his own blood to save Tsubasa's life. Consumption of the second leg enables Kiss-Shot to morph into a young adult.

Koyomi now must face the fully human priest, Guillotine Cutter, for Kiss-Shot's arms. Before the fight, he desperately pleads with Tsubasa to leave for her own safety. Tsubasa ultimately agrees, leaving her panties with Koyomi as a promise that they will reunite later. Nonetheless, Guillotine Cutter kidnaps Tsubasa, and Meme advises that Koyomi must "forget about being human again" in order to rescue her. Koyomi uses a power to transform his arms into tree roots to defeat Guillotine Cutter and save Tsubasa, but he appears to have abandoned his wish to become human again.

=== Reiketsu ===
Koyomi and Meme finally succeed in fully restoring Kiss-Shot. Koyomi expects Kiss-Shot to then change him back to a human. But before that, Kiss-Shot and Koyomi spend an evening on a rooftop, where Kiss-Shot reminisces about her previous subordinate, a Samurai who chose to commit suicide when Kiss-Shot was not able to restore his humanity. Koyomi goes off to buy food, but when he returns, he finds Kiss-Shot eating the eviscerated corpse of Guillotine Cutter. He is horrified at the realization that Kiss-Shot will now hunt humans again and that he himself will want to hunt as well. The realization leaves Koyomi despondent enough to want to die. But then Tsubasa appears and persuades Koyomi to stay alive. She also points out that Koyomi himself has the power to stop Kiss-Shot. Tsubasa's comforting words, as well as a clumsy attempt to fondle her breasts, bring Koyomi's spirits up enough to face Kiss-Shot in a fight.

Kiss-Shot and Koyomi face off in the Tokyo Olympic stadium. They repeatedly tear each other's limbs and heads off, but then regenerate their appendages back. Finally, Koyomi weakens Kiss-Shot by sucking out her blood. But Tsubasa suddenly realizes that Kiss-Shot wants to die. Kiss-Shot admits that she was going to throw the fight and explains that she has to die to restore a subordinate's humanity but couldn't do so for her previous subordinate because she was too scared of death. Kiss-Shot demands that Koyomi kill her, but Koyomi instead yells for Meme's help. Meme proposes a solution that will "make everyone miserable": Koyomi will suck out Kiss-Shot's blood only to the point that she is too weak to hunt humans, leaving them both quasi-versions of vampire and human. Over Kiss-Shot's protestations, Koyomi chooses this path. The next day, Koyomi explains to Tsubasa that he is mostly human but does have some vampire traits. Kiss-Shot now has the form of a child and can only eat by regularly sucking Koyomi's blood.

== Cast ==
Character	Voice actor/actress
Koyomi Araragi	Hiroshi Kamiya
Tsubasa Hanekawa	Yui Horie
Kiss-Shot Acerola-Orion Heart-Under-Blade	Maaya Sakamoto
Meme Oshino	Takahiro Sakurai
Dramaturgy	Masashi Ebara
Episode	Miyu Irino
Guillotine Cutter	Hōchū Ōtsuka

== Production ==
The anime adaptation of Kizumonogatari was announced in July 2010, and in March 2011, it was announced that the adaptation would be a film. In October 2015, it was announced that there would be three films: Kizumonogatari Part 1: Tekketsu (傷物語I 鉄血篇, Kizumonogatari I: Tekketsu-hen; "Iron-Blooded"), Kizumonogatari Part 2: Nekketsu (傷物語II 熱血篇, Kizumonogatari II: Nekketsu-hen; "Hot-Blooded"), and Kizumonogatari Part 3: Reiketsu (傷物語III 冷血篇, Kizumonogatari III: Reiketsu-hen; "Cold-Blooded"); the cast and crew for Tekketsu were also announced.

A compilation film, Kizumonogatari: Koyomi Vamp (傷物語 こよみヴァンプ), was announced at Aniplex Online Fest on September 10, 2023.

== Release ==
As of September 2011, a film adaptation was scheduled for release in 2012, but it was announced in April 2012 that the release date had been pushed back. In October 2015, the release date for the first film was announced for January 2016. The first film, Kizumonogatari Part 1: Tekketsu, was released in Japanese theaters on January 8, 2016. The second film, Kizumonogatari Part 2: Nekketsu, was released on August 19, 2016, and the third and final film, Kizumonogatari Part 3: Reiketsu, was released on January 6, 2017.

The first film was released in the United States by Aniplex of America on February 26, 2016. The third film premiered in the United States on April 7, 2017. In Hong Kong, Neofilms premiered the third anime film on May 18, 2017.

The compilation film, Kizumonogatari: Koyomi Vamp, was released on January 12, 2024. The film screened at the 28th Fantasia International Film Festival on July 27, 2024. Crunchyroll and Sony Pictures Entertainment released the film in select theaters for a one-day event in North America and Mexico on August 28, and in Australia on September 5, 2024.

== Reception ==
=== Box office and sales ===
On its opening weekend in Japan, Tekketsu placed third, grossing ¥322,509,300 from 243,702 admissions. On its second weekend, it was in sixth place by admissions and in fifth place by gross, with US$798,835. On the third weekend, it was in the ninth place by admissions and in the eighth place by gross, with US$418,165. The film reached more than 450,000 admissions by January 26. As of February 7, Tekketsu had grossed US$6,156,959. The Blu-ray Disc edition of the first film sold 36,018 in its first week, placing first in the chart.

The second film, Nekketsu, grossed ¥196 million on its opening weekend in Japan and was eighth placed by number of admissions, with 148,200. The film grossed US$3,442,498 overall at the Japanese box office. On November 22, ODEX announced that it would screen the second film in Singapore from November 25 to November 27. The Blu-ray Disc edition sold 30,670 in its first week, placing again first in the chart, with DVDs selling over 2,000. The third film, Reiketsu, placed ninth on its opening weekend, grossing ¥86.7 million (US$746,000). It earned ¥170,000,000 in 4 days.

=== Critical reception ===
Nick Creamer of Anime News Network gave the first film an overall grade of A−, saying that the film "might be the first third of a masterpiece. It is already a breathtaking experience. Incredible personality and creativity, strong mix of art and sound design make it a profoundly visceral experience." He also gave the second film an "A" grade, praising its story, animation, and sound design. He noted that the film's sexuality seemed to "trip into indulgent excess" at times. He ended the review by stating, "It's ugly, incomplete, and ostentatiously beautiful. It is one of a kind. Tells a thrilling and deeply personal story, bringing its characters' pain and pleasure to life through unparalleled animation and sound design."

The first film was the runner-up in the "Best Picture (film)" category at the 2016 Newtype Anime Awards.
