= Le Portrait de Petit Cossette =

Japanese original video animation anime series

- The cover of the third Region 2 volume as released by Aniplex on December 22, 2004

コゼットの肖像 (Kozetto no Shōzō)
- Genre: Gothic fantasy; Psychological horror; Romance
- Created by: Cossette House; Aniplex
- Original video animation
- Directed by: Akiyuki Shinbo
- Produced by: Masatoshi Fujimoto; Takeshi Anzai; Ai Abe
- Written by: Mayori Sekijima
- Music by: Yuki Kajiura
- Studio: Daume
- Licensed by: AUS: Madman Entertainment; NA: Sentai Filmworks; UK: MVM Films
- Released: May 26, 2004 – December 22, 2004
- Runtime: 38 minutes
- Episodes: 3
- Manga
- Written by: Asuka Katsura
- Published by: Kodansha
- English publisher: NA: Tokyopop
- Magazine: Magazine Z
- Original run: August 11, 2004 – December 21, 2004
- Volumes: 2

Le Portrait de Petit Cossette (Japanese: コゼットの肖像, Hepburn: Kozetto no Shōzō; "The Portrait of Cossette") is a Japanese original video animation anime series produced by Aniplex and animated by Daume. It spanned 3 episode OVA series and ran in 2004. It was licensed for North American distribution by Geneon Entertainment and released as Le Portrait de Petite Cossette. The OVAs were broadcast in the United States on Fuse on December 15, 2007, and in Canada on G4techTV's Anime Current programming block from January 19, 2008, to February 2, 2008. It is currently licensed by Sentai Filmworks and available for streaming and video-on-demand via The Anime Network.

The series was adapted into a manga series by Asuka Katsura. It spanned two volumes and was published in 2004. The English-language release is published by Tokyopop.

== Plot ==
The series focuses on Eiri Kurahashi, a college art student who works in an antique shop. One day, he sees the image of a girl in an antique glass. To his shock, she appears to be moving and living out her life before his eyes. He becomes infatuated with the girl, and one night at midnight, he somehow makes contact with her. He learns that her name is Cossette, and that she was an aristocrat's daughter during the 18th century. She reveals to him that her spirit has been entrapped within the glass because the artist Marcello Orlando murdered her. She tells Eiri that, in order to set her free, a man must be willing to take upon himself punishment for the sins Marcello committed.

As the series progresses, Eiri is tortured mentally and physically by Cossette, who demands that he prove his professed love for her. It is revealed that Eiri is the reincarnation of Marcello, and that Cossette is becoming as infatuated with him as he is with her. Also depicted are the efforts of the women in Eiri's life—relatives, friends, mentors, and the girl who secretly loves him—to free him from what is becoming apparent to them as a self-destructive path.

== Characters ==
Cossette d'Auvergne from Le Portrait de Petit Cossette

Cossette d'Auvergne (コゼット・ドーヴェルニュ, Kozetto Dōverunyu)

- Voiced by: Marina Inoue (Japanese); Michelle Ruff (English)

Cossette is a beautiful young girl whose spirit haunts a delicate Venetian glass. With delicate eyes, long blond hair and a lithe frame, her beauty is both haunting and enchanting. She was murdered by her lover Marcello Orlando because he became obsessed with her beauty and wanted her to stay young forever. Her soul was trapped in a glass. She convinced Eiri to enter "a pact of blood" to take revenge on Marcello. Since Eiri is the reincarnation of Marcello, she achieves this by torturing him. She later fell in love with Eiri.
There is a second Cossette created by Marcello. He drew such a perfect portrait of her, it gained life of its own. This Cossette was similar to the original, but a different being. She was jealous of the affection Eiri gave to the original Cossette and believed she was the true Cossette. She loved Marcello and considered Eiri a vessel for Marcello's soul.
Eiri Kurahashi (倉橋 永莉, Kurahashi Eiri)

- Voiced by: Mitsuki Saiga (Japanese); Johnny Yong Bosch (English)

Eiri is a talented budding artist, and works in his family's antique shop. His young world is transformed after he stumbles upon a delicate Venetian glass that is but a portal into the tragic world of a young girl named Cossette. He falls in love with this illusion that is as beautiful as she is cursed. Eiri is in fact the reincarnation of Marcello, who was brought back by Cossette because she was desperate to purify herself and the other glasses that became cursed after Marcello murdered her and her family. He agrees to the blood pact because he does not want to lose Cossette and allows her to torture him for the same reason, vowing that no matter how much pain he suffers he will not kill Cossette like Marcello did.
Shoko Mataki (真滝 翔子, Mataki Shōko)

- Voiced by: Megumi Toyoguchi (Japanese); Julie Ann Taylor (English)

Shoko is a close friend and confidant of Eiri. Although an extremely sharp young lady, her insecurity is coupled with a neurotic nature that is endearing. She easily gets jealous when she hears about Eiri's love life. She cares deeply about him when he changes due to the pact he entered with Cossette, and is horrified when he starts to be wounded, asking what kind of person who claimed she loved him could do that.
Yuu Saiga (斎賀 由布, Saiga Yūu)

- Voiced by: Mamiko Noto (Japanese); Linda Patrick (English)

A young girl with undeveloped psychic abilities who works at the local deli. Although she doesn't know exactly what is going on with Eiri, her abilities allow her some insight into the paranormal roots of Eiri's obsession.
Michiru Yajiri (鏃 みちる, Yajiri Michiru)

- Voiced by: Ikumi Fujiwara (Japanese); Annie Pastrano (English)

Michiru works as the local tarot card reader and shares with Eiri an emotional bond that weaves her into the saga of Cossette's vengeance.
Zenshinni of Shakado (釈迦堂 菩心尼, Shakadō-Zenshinni)

- Voiced by: Rei Igarashi (Japanese); Jane Alan (English)

As the local priestess and psychic, Shakado's talents reveal frightening energies hovering over Eiri like the shadow of death. She attempts an exorcism to free him, but is not powerful enough to break the blood pact.
Hatsumi Mataki (真滝 八海, Mataki Hatsumi)

- Voiced by: Kumiko Yokote (Japanese); Wendee Lee (English)

The local physician and Shoko's aunt, Hatsumi is utterly confounded by Eiri's psychosomatic afflictions. When Shoko's soul is sent to Purgatory, she is unable to find a scientific explanation for her condition.
Marcello Orlando (マルチェロ・オルランド, Maruchero Orurando)

- Voiced by: Masashi Ebara (Japanese); Tony Oliver (English)

A talented artist that was close with Cossette's family and was Cossette's fiancee. He murdered her and her family out of obsession with the Cossette he painted, not wishing Cossette to grow up. This action lead to the grudges of her family seeping into the glass objects of the house, turning them into cursed spirits. Their despair, and her own at his betrayal, weighed down Cossette, trapping her in her glass. The final portrait he drew of Cossette was so life like that it gained a soul of its own similar, though different, from Cossette's true soul trapped in the glass. He was reincarnated as Eiri.
Michio Hisamoto (久本 道夫, Hisamoto Michio)

- Voiced by: Shinnosuke Furumoto (Japanese); Sean Roberts (English)

He is a student who attends the same university as Eiri. An adult, he is frequently seen smoking.
Yutaka Enokido (榎戸 豊, Enokido Yutaka)

- Voiced by: Junpei Morita

He is an old man who made a great deal of money through tax and land fraud and buys the glass set Cossette's glass was a part of, although not Cossette's glass, which Eiri has removed.
Kaori Nishimoto (西本 香織, Nishimoto Kaori)

- Voiced by: Yukari Tamura

She is the much younger lover of Yutaka Enokido. She frequently smokes and jokingly calls Yutaka her papa.

== Media ==
=== OVA ===
Aniplex released the three Region 2 DVD compilations from May 26, 2004, to December 22, 2004. On December 1, 2004, the soundtrack to the OVA was released by Wint. It contained eighteen tracks by Yuki Kajiura, including the main theme music "Jewel" (宝石, Hōseki). Later released as a single on August 11, 2004, "Hōseki" is sung by Marina Inoue. During the period when Geneon Entertainment held the license, the episodes were aired on Fuse TV The anime has since been relicensed by Sentai Filmworks, with distribution from Section23 Films. The OVA was released on April 20, 2010, and streamed on the Anime Network a month later.

Aniplex DVD releases
Volume	Released
1	May 26, 2004
2	July 28, 2004
3	December 22, 2004

Petit Cossette is also licensed in New Zealand and Australia by Madman Entertainment, and in German by Tokyopop.

=== Manga ===
Le Portrait de Petit Cossette appeared as a serial in Monthly Magazine Z. Kodansha collected the chapters into two tankōbon volume and published them from August 11, 2004, to December 21, 2004.

Tokyopop licensed Le Portrait de Petit Cossette for an English-language release in North America and published the volumes from July 2006 to November 2006. However, both volumes are now out of print. The series is also licensed in France by Asuka Comics.

No.	Original release date	Original ISBN	North American release date	North American ISBN
01	August 11, 2004	978-4-06-349183-8	July 11, 2006	978-1-59816-530-2
02	December 21, 2004	978-4-06-349191-3	November 7, 2006	978-1-59816-531-9

== Production ==
SME Visual Works (later Aniplex) producer Masatoshi Fujimoto had watched Neon Genesis Evangelion (1995) and was interested in working with an "unusual... auteur"-like director similar to Hideaki Anno, and having then watched the Starship Girl Yamamoto Yohko OVAs (1996–1997) and Metal Fighter Miku (1994) was convinced that Akiyuki Shinbo was one such director that he would like to work with. The pair were originally conceiving an adaptation of Go Nagai's popular Devilman manga, but the plans never went through, and instead Cossette was concepted. According to Fujimoto, the intent behind the work was to illuminate "Shinbo as an auteur."

The series featured several of Shinbo's prior collaborators: notably writer Mayori Sekijima, animation studio Daume, and co-art director Junichi Higashi of Studio Easter. The series was also the first collaboration between Shinbo and co-art director Hisaharu Iijima, who would work together on series produced by Shaft for nearly 20 years. Shinbo and the series' character designer, Hirofumi Suzuki, worked in a semi-subterranean room at Daume mostly by themselves (despite the fact that the room could accommodate for many more people). The character design for Cossette herself was based on a doll, but Suzuki believed he had unconscious influence through Shinbo's The SoulTaker (2001) and the particular character designs of animator Akio Watanabe. Shinbo humored with Suzuki that the series was like an unofficial sequel to The SoulTaker given the main vocal cast is the same and that it has a similar worldview. Speaking with Shinbo in an interview, Animestyle magazine editor-in-chief Yūichirō Oguro called the atmosphere between the two series "exactly the same."

Shinbo worked on the series with a philosophy of wanting it to be seen by many people. He described the works he had made up until then as being made in a self-centered way and that those who couldn't follow his work didn't need to; however, he started thinking that a work that doesn't "engage with the world" was useless, so it was around the time of Cossette that he began to look for ways to make his works more accessible.

== Reception ==
Anime News Network's Theron Martin described it as "an artsy, stylish supernatural horror story about love and obsession. Its dramatic visuals, exceptional artistry, and sumptuous musical scoring make watching it quite an experience, and the story isn't half bad, either." However, he noted that the storyline of the first two episodes was "fairly predictable" and the secondary characters were "underdeveloped and underused". Reviewers at Mania Entertainment praised it as "a love story that's almost devoid of happiness, with a style and presentation that makes it engrossing, and yet not exactly easy to watch" and "an easy recommendation for those looking for something more mature from their anime."

== Notes ==
=== Works cited ===
- Shinbo, Akiyuki (July 27, 2012). 新房語 [Shinbogatari] (in Japanese). Ichijinsha. ISBN 978-4758012591.
