= Tomoyuki Itamura =

Japanese director

Tomoyuki Itamura 板村 智幸
- Born: Japan
- Occupations: Animator, director, storyboard artist
- Years active: 2004–present
- Employer(s): OLM (2004–2007); Shaft (2007–2017)
- Known for: Monogatari series (2011–2017) (Note: Seasons Nisemonogatari, Nekomonogatari (Black), Monogatari Series Second Season, Hanamonogatari, Tsukimonogatari, Owarimonogatari, Koyomimonogatari, and Owarimonogatari II.); Call of the Night (2022–2025)

Tomoyuki Itamura (Japanese: 板村 智幸, Hepburn: Itamura Tomoyuki) is a Japanese director, animator, and storyboard artist. He joined OLM in 2004 as an in-between animator and left in 2007 to join Shaft. Itamura took over the Monogatari series from Tatsuya Oishi as his television directorial debut with Nisemonogatari. With Akiyuki Shinbo, Itamura directed all subsequent televised installments until he left the studio following Owarimonogatari II.

== Career ==
Itamura joined OLM in 2002, and he first served as an in-between animator on the studio's Pokémon Chronicles television series. In 2006, he storyboarded two episodes of Ray the Animation, and the following year left the studio, where he then joined Shaft. That year, he debuted as an episode director with the 3rd episode of Sayonara, Zetsubou-Sensei, and in 2008 debuted as a project director under the chief direction of Akiyuki Shinbo with Mahō Sensei Negima!: Shiroki Tsubasa Ala Alba. In 2012, Itamura succeeded Tatsuya Oishi as the successor to Shaft's adaptation of the Monogatari series following Oishi's decision to animate the Kizumonogatari novels in film format (which was completed in 2017).

Itamura was chosen to take over the Monogatari series succeeding Tatsuya Oishi due to Shinbo's faith in his abilities. In particular, Shinbo mentioned that he had been aware of Itamura since he joined Shaft, and the former believed that episode 2 of Bakemonogatari (which Itamura directed) was very good. Itamura stayed with the Monogatari series for the rest of its run until 2017 with Owarimonogatari II with the exception of Kizumonogatari that Oishi had directed. Shinbo took over as sole director for the final part of the Final Season books, Zoku Owarimonogatari, and Itamura went independent of Shaft. He spent a few years working around at various studios until finally settling around Bones and Liden Films where he directed his first series outside of Shaft, The Case Study of Vanitas at the former and Call of the Night at the latter (with Tetsuya Miyanishi, who had worked on Monogatari under Itamura, serving as a co-director). Both works, like Monogatari, involve vampires, which led to Itamura humorously saying that he seemed to have a connection to vampire stories. Although not his debut as a series director, The Case Study of Vanitas was Itamura's first work not under the chief direction of Shinbo, and he wanted to make a cool work even as an independent director.

=== Style ===
Itamura's style, specifically as the director of the Monogatari series, has been described as being much more minimalistic than his predecessor Tatsuya Oishi, with analysis of his style placing emphasis on sharp color contrasts, shifts in stylistic artistry, changes in overall color schemes, and the implementation of "chapter breaks" that make use of the "adaptive nature" of the series. However, as Itamura was given the opportunity to take over the Monogatari series following Oishi's footsteps, Itamura's identity as a director can be seen as developing throughout the series. Initially, Itamura incorporated (but more sparingly) similar visual language as far as on-screen text usage as his predecessor, such as having Kanji text flash as non-sequiturs, puns, wordplay, and so forth. In Monogatari Series Second Season, Itamura attempts to use more text and flashes than previously, and using them in a wider variety of circumstances and performing a wider variety of jobs. Whereas Oishi may have used paragraphs of text from the novel, or short fragments of sentences or Kanji, Itamura began to employ on-screen text as chapter titles (the aforementioned chapter breaks) or to represent character dialogues and thoughts. however, in Tsukimonogatari, and in the rest of the series, the visual language changes to its final form in Itamura's care. Rather than use Oishi's method of solidly-colored screens with text, Itamura used paper collage-like transitions that emphasized certain parts of the text by highlighting them. Shifting away from using such transitions for tempo and visual emphasis, the final works in Itamura's Monogatari tenure instead make use of on-screen text to provide to the narrative itself, often showcasing unreliable narration from the perspective of a character or insight into their experiences.

Reflecting on the eight years Itamura was a part of the Monogatari series, he said that he happened to join the production of Bakemonogatari at just the right time to work closely with Oishi, which he described as being a good learning experience. He discussed with Shinbo in regard to him taking over the television series starting with Nisemonogatari, and understood that he wouldn't be able to imitate Oishi's style even if he wanted to. Oishi himself was supportive of Itamura experimenting with his own style and finding his own version of the series through his work, though Itamura did, at first, use similar formats to Oishi at the beginning of his tenure on the series due to the circumstances of time and experience. Some creators are able to create their works simply by reading the scenario they're given; though, Itamura describes himself as capable of working only after doing research. In Sayonara, Zetsubou-Sensei, he was in charge of a segment that featured rakugo, so he went to a play in-person and watched ''Tiger & Dragon'' for research; and in Owarimonogatari, he looked into ball-jointed dolls and cricket to use as motifs and gags. Sound director Youta Tsuruoka described Itamura similarly, saying that Itamura was a director who worked more on "logic" whereas Oishi was more "intuitive."

Regarding his own style as director, Itamura considered his primary principle to be bringing out the charms of the original work, an idea inspired by Shinbo's work on Sayonara, Zetsubou-Sensei. He also doesn't like to make decisions entirely on his own and oftentimes listens to other staff members from other departments, or assistant and episode directors, in making decisions, but that he continues to pursue a level of quality and doesn't wait around for ideas from them. Itamura considers this facet of his directorial style to be the primary characteristic that he inherited from Shinbo.

== Works ==
=== Television series ===
In "Director(s)" column highlights Itamura's directorial works.

Year	Title	Director(s)	Studio	SB (Note: Storyboard artist.)	ED (Note: Episode director, equivalent to unit director.)	Other roles and notes	Ref(s)
2002	Pokémon Chronicles	Kunihiko Yuyama (chief)	OLM	No	No	In-between animator	
2005	To Heart 2	Norihiko Sutō	OLM	No	No	In-between animator	
2005	Guyver: The Bioboosted Armor	Katsuhito Akiyama	OLM	No	No	In-between animator	
2006	Ray the Animation	Naohito Takahashi	OLM	Yes	No		
2006	Utawarerumono	Tomoki Kobayashi	OLM	No	No	In-between animator	
2007	Negima!?	Akiyuki Shinbo; Shin Oonuma (chief)	Shaft	No	No	Assistant episode director	
2007	Sayonara, Zetsubou-Sensei	Akiyuki Shinbo	Shaft	No	Yes	Key animator	
2007	Ef: A Tale of Melodies	Shin Oonuma	Shaft	No	No	2nd key animator	
2008	(Zoku) Sayonara, Zetsubou-Sensei	Akiyuki Shinbo; Yukihiro Miyamoto (chief episode)	Shaft	Yes	Yes	Key animator	
2008	Hidamari Sketch x 365	Akiyuki Shinbo	Shaft	No	Yes		
2008	Ef: A Tale of Melodies	Shin Oonuma	Shaft	Yes	No		
2009	Maria Holic	Yukihiro Miyamoto (series)	Shaft	Yes	Yes		
2009	(Zan) Sayonara, Zetsubou-Sensei	Akiyuki Shinbo; Yukihiro Miyamoto (chief episode)	Shaft	Yes	No		
2009	Bakemonogatari	Akiyuki Shinbo; Tatsuya Oishi (series)	Shaft	Yes	Yes	Assistant episode director Key animator	
2010	Arakawa Under the Bridge	Akiyuki Shinbo; Yukihiro Miyamoto (series)	Shaft	Yes	Yes		
2010	Arakawa Under the Bridge x Bridge	Akiyuki Shinbo; Yukihiro Miyamoto (series)	Shaft	Yes	No		
2010	And Yet the Town Moves	Akiyuki Shinbo	Shaft	Yes	Yes	Key animator	
2011	Puella Magi Madoka Magica	Akiyuki Shinbo; Yukihiro Miyamoto (series)	Shaft	No	No	Opening director and storyboard	
2011	Ground Control to Psychoelectric Girl	Akiyuki Shinbo (chief); Yukihiro Miyamoto (series)	Shaft	Yes	Yes	Key animator	
2011	Hidamari Sketch x SP	Akiyuki Shinbo	Shaft	No	Yes		
2012	Nisemonogatari	Akiyuki Shinbo; Tomoyuki Itamura (series)	Shaft	Yes	Yes	Key animator Assistant episode director	
2012	Nekomonogatari (Black)	Akiyuki Shinbo (chief); Tomoyuki Itamura	Shaft	Yes	Yes	Key animator	
2013	Monogatari Series Second Season	Akiyuki Shinbo (chief); Tomoyuki Itamura	Shaft	Yes	Yes	Key animator	
2014	Hanamonogatari	Akiyuki Shinbo (chief); Tomoyuki Itamura	Shaft	Yes	Yes	Key animator	
2014	Mekakucity Actors	Akiyuki Shinbo (chief); Yuki Yase	Shaft	No	No	2nd key animator	
2014	Tsukimonogatari	Akiyuki Shinbo (chief); Tomoyuki Itamura	Shaft	Yes	Yes		
2015	Owarimonogatari	Akiyuki Shinbo (chief); Tomoyuki Itamura	Shaft	Yes	Yes		
2016	March Comes In like a Lion	Akiyuki Shinbo; Kenjirou Okada (series)	Shaft	Yes	No		
2017	Owarimonogatari II	Akiyuki Shinbo (chief); Tomoyuki Itamura	Shaft	Yes	Yes		
2019	Carole & Tuesday	Shinichirō Watanabe (chief); Motonobu Hori	Bones	Yes	No		
2019	Ahiru no Sora	Keizō Kusakawa (chief); Shingo Tamaki	Diomedéa	Yes	No		
2021	Godzilla Singular Point	Atsushi Takahashi	Bones	Yes	No		
2021	The Case Study of Vanitas	Tomoyuki Itamura	Bones	Yes	No	Ending director and storyboard	
2022	Call of the Night	Tomoyuki Itamura; Tetsuya Miyanishi (chief)	Liden Films	Yes	No	Ending director and storyboard Assistant episode director Key animator	
2025	Call of the Night 2	Tomoyuki Itamura	Liden Films	Yes	No		

=== OVAs ===
Year	Title	Director(s)	Studio	SB	ED	Other roles and notes	Ref(s)
2009	Mahō Sensei Negima!: Shiroki Tsubasa Ala Alba (#3)	Akiyuki Shinbo (chief); Tomoyuki Itamura	Shaft; Studio Pastoral	Yes	No		

=== ONAs ===
Year	Title	Director(s)	Studio	SB	ED	Other roles and notes	Ref(s)
2016	Koyomimonogatari	Akiyuki Shinbo (chief); Tomoyuki Itamura	Shaft	Yes	Yes		
2020	Super Shiro	Masaaki Yuasa (chief); Tomohisa Shimoyama (chief)	Science Saru	Yes	No		
2027	Beat & Motion	Yuki Komada; Megumi Soda	MAPPA	No	No	Script supervisor Concept design	

=== Films ===
Year	Title	Director(s)	Studio	SB	ED	Other roles and notes	Ref(s)
2006	Dōbutsu no Mori	Jōji Shimura	OLM	No	No	In-between animator	
2012	Puella Magi Madoka Magica the Movie: Beginnings	Akiyuki Shinbo (chief); Yukihiro Miyamoto	Shaft	Yes	Yes		
2012	Puella Magi Madoka Magica the Movie: Eternal	Akiyuki Shinbo (chief); Yukihiro Miyamoto	Shaft	Yes	Yes		
2018	I Want to Eat Your Pancreas	Shinichirō Ushijima	Studio VOLN	Yes	Yes		

== Notes ==
=== Works cited ===
- Rubin, Lucy Paige (2017). Between Comedy and Despair: The House Style of Studio Shaft (Bachelor of the Arts). Wesleyan University.
- Kushida, Makoto, ed. (2017). 〈物語〉Febri ["Monogatari" Febri] (in Japanese). Ichijinsha. ASIN B075QWP3NZ.
- Takashima, Masashi, ed. (2026). TVアニメ『よふかしのうた』公式ガイド: ~自由な夜への案内書~ [TV Anime "Call of the Night" Official Guidebook: A Guide to the Free Night] (in Japanese). Shogakukan.
