= Akiyuki Shinbo =

Japanese animation director

Akiyuki Shinbo 新房 昭之
- Born: September 27, 1961 (age 65); Koori, Fukushima Prefecture, Japan
- Other names: Jūhachi Minamizawa (南澤十八); Futoshi Shiiya (椎谷太志) (Note: A pseudonymic anagram used by the staff of Shaft mainly for in-between animation supervision but was used for Shinbo for a few storyboards in the first season of Hidamari Sketch.); Sōji Homura (帆村壮二) (Note: Sōji Homura's storyboards were named as "Shinbo's" storyboards by Shaft.); Satoko Shindō (進藤里子); Fuyashi Tō (東冨耶子) (Note: An anagram of Shaft primarily used by staff for series composition credits across the studio's works, but used by Shinbo for the storyboards to the seventh episode of Monogatari Series Off & Monster Season.)
- Education: Tokyo Designer Academy
- Occupations: Animator, director, storyboard artist, writer
- Years active: 1981–present
- Employer(s): Bebow (1981); Kaname Production (1981~?); Studio Oz (?~?); Studio Tome (?~1984); Studio One Pattern (1984~?); Shaft (2004–present)
- Awards: 2011 Newtype Anime Awards—Director Prize; 11th Tokyo Anime Award for Best Director

Akiyuki Shinbo (Note: Although he asked ANN to romanize his name as Akiyuki Simbo, his 2012 interview collection stylizes his name as Akiyuki Shinbou, and his 2019 interview collection stylizes his name as Akiyuki Shimbo.) (Japanese: 新房 昭之, Hepburn: Shinbō Akiyuki; born September 27, 1961) is a Japanese animator, director, compositional writer, and storyboard artist. Best known for his works with Shaft, he has attained international recognition for his unique visual style and storytelling methods.

Born in Koori, Fukushima Prefecture, Shinbo began his career in the early 1980s as an animator, but his true rise to fame in the industry occurred when he received the opportunity to direct for series produced by Pierrot at the turn of the decade and early 90s. His unique style developed across the studio's productions, culminating in Yu Yu Hakusho, which led to his debut as a series director with the J.C.Staff television series Metal Fighter Miku (1994). Over the next several years, Shinbo developed his directorial style through numerous avenues in the industry; and the pure form of his style has been described as coalescing in series like The SoulTaker (2001) and Le Portrait de Petit Cossette (2004).

In 2004, Shinbo was invited by newly appointed Shaft president Mitsutoshi Kubota to collaborate with the studio as a director. Since the newfound collaborative effort's debut with Tsukuyomi: Moon Phase (2004), he has mentored various directors and won numerous awards for his productions with the studio. His notable directorial works with Shaft include the Monogatari series (2009–present), Puella Magi Madoka Magica (2011), and March Comes In like a Lion (2016–2018).

== Early life ==
Shinbo was born on September 27, 1961, in Koori, Fukushima Prefecture, Japan. Due to the town not having many bookstores, and his parents not buying much manga for him, Shinbo's main source for manga was Weekly Bokura Magazine, which ran from 1969 to 1971. Although he noted that he was broadly influenced by the magazine, he emphasized that he was a fan of Tiger Mask prior to its move to Weekly Shōnen Magazine. He was also a fan of Go Nagai's manga, and volume 3 of Nagai's Devilman was the first manga tankōbon that he ever bought himself. Later, he found himself drawn more towards anime, especially with the release of Space Battleship Yamato in October 1974 during his first year of junior high school, and Galaxy Express 999 a few years later.

After high school, he wanted to study anime and leave the countryside, so he moved to Tokyo and attended Tokyo Designer Academy. Initially, he wanted to become a manga artist, but after moving to Tokyo decided that there were better artists than him more suited for the job. Kazuki Takahashi, whom Shinbo befriended soon after his move to Tokyo, exemplified the kind of person Shinbo saw as professional manga artist. During his studies at college, Shinbo was unable to watch much anime, but he was a fan of the works that involved Osamu Dezaki, Akio Sugino, and Yoshinori Kanada, so he asked his brother to record episodes for him to watch when he could. The students of the college were given the opportunity to tour studios in search of jobs. Shinbo thought it might be interesting to direct "strange" works, but to become a director at the time usually meant becoming a production assistant (制作進行), a job he had no interest in, so he thought becoming a director was impossible.

== Career ==
=== Early career ===
After graduating from college, Shinbo entered the industry as an animator in the early 1980s at Bebow, the studio founded by Tomonori Kogawa, and shared a room with colleague Hirotoshi Sano. His first job in the industry, he was fired for showing up late at work all the time due to playing BurgerTime (1982) at an arcade. and he soon after joined Kaname Production, but quickly left to join Masahito Yamashita's animation collective Studio Oz. He joined the group sometime during their rebranding to the name Studio One Pattern (supposedly due to confusion with another animation studio named OZ). He and Studio One Pattern colleague Shinsaku Kozuma shared a room for some amount of time during his tenure with the group. Although not much is known about Shinbo's time as an animator, due to a lack of sources and a lack of credits, Kozuma stated that he was good at drawing. His earliest known given credit in the industry is GeGeGe no Kitarō 3rd Series episode 3 (1985). However, he worked on several other productions uncredited—the full extent of which is not known—some of which he and those who know him have confirmed, such as Serendipity the Pink Dragon (1983), Igano Kabamaru (1983), and GoShogun: The Time Etranger (1985).

Yamashita heard that Studio Pierrot was looking for directors in the early 1990s for Musashi, the Samurai Lord, and he subsequently recommended Shinbo. He joined the production early in its run, and initially served as director Akira Shigino's assistant for the first episode. He debuted as a full-fledged episode director himself on the fourth episode of the series. Later on in the series, he also made his debut as a storyboard artist and animation director. Reflecting on the experience, Shinbo said that the production was a difficult time due to the necessity to order the key animation from Korean sub-contractors and the in-between animation from Chinese sub-contractors, oftentimes leaving only as little as a single day for the episode directors and other staff to do their final checks before the animation cels were photographed; and, according to Shinbo, it was not unusual for staff to spend nights at the studio working, and both he and his colleagues developed temporomandibular joint dysfunction due to pressure and, at least in Shinbo's case, nervousness in making his debut as a director. Despite the difficulties of the work, Shinbo views Shigino as his directorial mentor.

Succeeding Musashi, the Samurai Lord, Shinbo worked on Marude Dameo (1991), which is where he met animator and storyboard artist Motosuke Takahashi, whose storyboards were so well-crafted that Shinbo had little to worry about in processing the storyboards besides the timing and tempo of actions and lines. Takahashi also taught Shinbo other parts of the production process, like how to read time sheets.

No longer an animator at Studio One Pattern, Shinbo received steady episodic work from Pierrot, and he eventually joined the studio's production team for Yu Yu Hakusho (1992–94). Shinbo directed 19 episodes of the series and storyboarded 13 under the series direction of Noriyuki Abe, a colleague from Musashi, the Samurai Lord. In particular, Shinbo's involvement with the series is noted for his work on the Dark Tournament arc, which is regarded as the first appearance of his visual style. Speaking on his motivations in the series, he spoke highly of animation director Atsushi Wakabayashi, whom Shinbo described as the driving force behind his work, and previous collaborator Motosuke Takahashi, whom Shinbo regards as another mentor; although, he mentioned that storyboarding for the series could be difficult due to the screenplay often including onomatopoeic sounds found in the manga.

=== Breakthrough productions ===
While Shinbo worked on Yu Yu Hakusho, J.C.Staff attempted to produce its first original television series, Metal Fighter Miku (1994). However, the director who was originally attached the project left partway through its pre-production, and Nippon Victor producer Hiroyuki Birukawa had to find a replacement director. Shinbo had already been contacted about the work and was originally supposed to storyboard an episode; but Birukawa happened to watch the 74th episode of Yu Yu Hakusho, which Shinbo had both storyboarded and directed, and thought he was "amazing." Birukawa didn't know how to read Shinbo's name correctly and misread it as "Niibusa" in his attempt to hire him, but in the end Shinbo was chosen as the replacement director. Although Shinbo hadn't directed a series before, there weren't very many other opportunities to do so; and coupled with the fact that he only had experience as a director on Pierrot's works—which he described as mainstream but not otaku-orientated, as opposed to J.C. Staff's original video animation (OVA) approach—he took the offer. Birukawa was specifically interested in Shinbo's usage of colors and his ability to surprise the audience, though Shinbo commented that as a first time director the series was difficult for him. As the previous director had left during pre-production, the series was in an awkward state for a replacement director due to episode three's storyboards already being complete, which meant Shinbo had to make corrections to the 'completed' storyboards that already had corrections from the previous director. Since the storyboards, and the work as a whole, weren't his, it was difficult for him to bring out his own tastes and style while keeping the work cohesive. He not only had to find himself as a series director, but also how to not only include his own tastes and put the work together. His motivation was lowered by the fact that he was making so many storyboard corrections, and he said that during production he thought he might have been better off processing all of the episodes at the episode directing stage instead. However, when he saw episode 11 of the series, he was surprised and had the thought that he could not "lose to" the work of episode director Naohito Takahashi and animation director Yuriko Chiba; and so in the final episode, which he directed and storyboarded himself, he worked with the motivation of not being outdone by anyone. Birukawa believed that the episode was produced perfectly.

From 1995 to 1999, Shinbo participated in a number of OVA productions with various studios and varying success. In 1995, he directed the sixth and final episode of Madhouse's OVA series Devil Hunter Yohko, which he cited as a major point in his development as a director. In 1996, he returned to J.C.Staff to produce Galaxy Fräulein Yuna Returns, a sequel series to the 1995 OVA directed by Yorifusa Yamaguchi, which Shinbo had served as storyboard artist for.; and that same year with J.C. Staff, he directed the 3-episode OVA Starship Girl Yamamoto Yohko, which spawned its own animated franchise consisting of a sequel 3-episode OVA series in 1997 and a 26-episode television series in 1999. Also in 1996, he directed Debutante Detective Corps at Daume, his first of two projects with the company.

The Starship Girl Yamamoto Yohko television series was Shinbo's first collaboration with character designer and animator Akio Watanabe. The OVAs had character designs by Kazuto Nakazawa, but Shinbo wanted the characters to feel more realistic while keeping their "cute" qualities. Shinbo found out about Watanabe after he did research and asked J.C. Staff producer Yuuji Matsukura to offer Watanabe the role of character designer, and since Watanabe had already known about Shinbo and was a fan of Metal Fighter Miku, he accepted the job. Shinbo discussed the initial story with series composition writer Mayori Sekijima, who had written the screenplay to two of the OVA series' episodes, and decided that he wanted to make a narrative similar to the Space Cobra anime series directed by Osamu Dezaki; and as production started, Shinbo gave up his New Years' vacation to storyboard the first episode. The series was also the second collaboration between Shinbo and animator Toshiaki Tetsura, who worked on the second OVA series and was brought onto the TV series as both mechanical designer and visual director, (Note: Tetsura is officially credited as visual concept (ビジュアルコンセプト), but Shinbo refers to him as the visual director (ビジュアルディレクター).) whom Shinbo described as indispensable to the development of his works following Starship Girl Yamamoto Yohko, and that he couldn't imagine them without Tetsura's help.

Prior to the conception of New Hurricane Polymar (1997)—a reboot of the 1974 superhero series Hurricane Polymar—at Tatsunoko Production, character designer Yasuomi Umetsu had done two previous projects at Tatsunoko with another director, but he felt that that director did not have love for the works. Umetsu instead asked J.C. Staff to help produce the series and lend a director, leading to Shinbo's involvement on the project. Shinbo was a fan of Tatsuo Yoshida, a director and the founder of Tatsunoko Production, and was happy to be able to participate in one of the company's works. He wanted to use American comics as the basis for the OVA's style, but he said that American comics weren't readily available in Japan at the time, so instead bande dessinée was used for inspiration. Despite the change in inspiration, Umetsu believed the team succeeded in creating the American comic-like atmosphere that Shinbo wanted. The OVA only produced two episodes, however, and Shinbo regretted being unable to make more. Later, he mentioned that he learned how to implement the compositional technique of "smacking" (ナメ) from animator Mamoru Sasaki while working on the project.

Shinbo again worked with Madhouse on an OVA adaptation of Saki Okuse's Twilight of the Dark Master manga in 1997, and again with J.C.Staff on a 3-episode OVA adaptation of Hitoshi Okuda's Detatoko Princess manga series. During the production of Detatoko Princess, he decided that he wanted to direct with a "simple and frivolous" philosophy and that he "hate[d] making ordinary stuff." He worked for the final time with Pierrot in 1999 on the 4-episode original series Tenamonya Voyagers.

=== Early 2000s ===
Following New Hurricane Polymar at Tatsunoko Production, Shinbo started work on another project with the studio that never ended up being produced. Afterwards, he was asked to direct the cutscenes for Tatsunoko Fight (2000), a video game using characters from various Tatsunoko works, and was then asked to direct an original series titled "Warhead." Eventually, "Warhead" became "The SoulTaker" and was produced under Tatsunoko Production and their digital vision Tatsunoko VCR. Admittedly, when Shinbo worked on the series, he focused more on making unique shot compositions and imagery than creating a story, and left all organization of the narrative to previous collaborator and scriptwriter Mayori Sekijima. Along with Sekijima, the series also marked Shinbo's second collaboration with character designer Akio Watanabe, and his third with Toshiaki Tetsura, who worked on the series as the visual director and mechanical designer. Shinbo and Tetsura experimented with a technique of using the storyboards that the former had drawn, cleaning them up, and enlarging them to use as background layouts (原図). The series' production faced many difficulties, and two of the most prominent issues included episode 10's storyboards taking too long to complete, and the team being unable to get many other companies to work on the show. Such inhibitions set back the show's production schedule during its broadcast run, though three studios did ultimately help out and take charge of three of The SoulTaker's episodes: Kyoto Animation on episodes 3 and 6, and Triangle Staff (who further outsourced to Shaft) on episode 10. Normally, an outsourcing studio would pull out of a work if the schedule was too difficult, but Shaft took on the difficulty since the staff at the studio found the series to be interesting. Shinbo lauded both, stating that Kyoto Animation did a great job and that he was impressed with the quality of Shaft's episode. The SoulTaker received both praise and criticism for his direction and the series' art design by reviewers; despite the criticisms, Mike Toole of Anime News Network said that the series was important for being "the start of Akiyuki Shinbo's long transformation" as a director.

With The SoulTaker complete, Shinbo took a brief hiatus from the mainstream anime industry. In 2001, he directed a short music video spin-off of the Triangle Hearts series, which started his relationship with Seven Arcs. For the next 3 years, he mainly focused on producing hentai series under the pseudonym Jūhachi Minamizawa (南澤 十八, Minamizawa Jūhachi) with AT-2 (the adult video brand of studio Arcturus, at the time a subsidiary of Seven Arcs). Shinbo's hentai series were lauded for their visual aesthetics, with one blogger referring to them as "unhinged and downright batshit crazy"; and one series, Nurse Me!, served as the catalyst for future collaborations with first-time episode director Shin Oonuma.

Along with the various hentai series produced by Arcturus, Shinbo was hired to direct the Seven Arcs series Triangle Heart: Sweet Songs Forever (2003), which Masaki Tsuzuki had created. For the work, Shinbo opted to use the method of creating background layouts that he created with Tetsura on The SoulTaker. The series served as a starting point for the creation of Magical Girl Lyrical Nanoha the following year, which featured the return of Seven Arcs, Shinbo, and Tsuzuki. The series was important in influencing Shinbo's approach to narrative structures by rejecting conventional structures of the time. Nanoha received praise for its atmosphere, themes, and uniqueness from reviewers in the west. Tim Jones from T.H.E.M. Anime Reviews noted that the series tended to focus more on physical fighting, rather than the usual magical girl trope of fighting with long-range magic attacks, despite having many of the genre's usual tropes. While Carl Kimlinger of Anime News Network criticized the series for having a more mature tone than its characters ages should have represented, online magazine ICv2, conversely, stated that the series had become immensely popular in the United States among "hardcore" fans due to the characters' adversaries containing more realistic social issues not found in other series of the same genre. Despite his criticisms of the series, Kimlinger praised the series' usage of multiple art-styles, which he found gave the series an "undeniably appealing" look. The success of the series spawned a franchise that consists of four television series and four theatrical films, albeit all other entries in the franchise did not involve Shinbo.

Around the same time, SME Visual Works producer Masatoshi Fujimoto was looking for an "auteur"-like director with whom he could make a series with; and after viewing the Yamamoto Yohko OVAs and Metal Fighter Miku, thought that Shinbo would be a fitting director. When they met, Shinbo asked him to watch episode 74 of Yu Yu Hakusho which he had been in charge of, as well. Originally, the two had planned to make a work based on Devilman, but the idea never came around, and instead Le Portrait de Petit Cossette (2004) was born. The series incorporated Shinbo's direction with several of his previous collaborators: writer Mayori Sekijima, animation studio Daume, and art director Junichi Higashi (the latter of whom Shinbo had worked with on Tenamonya Voyagers); and the series was also Hisaharu Iijima's first time working with Shinbo as an art director and would later become a core element of Shinbo's later works with Shaft. The series also marked the first time Shinbo worked with composer Yuki Kajiura. Fujimoto discovered Shinbo while he was looking for "unusual" directors, and he intended for Cossette to serve as a vessel to illuminate "Shinbo as an auteur". During the production, Shinbo and Hirofumi Suzuki (the character designer and main animation director) worked in a semi-subterranean room at Daume mostly by themselves, even though the room could accommodate for many more people. Shinbo described his previous works as self-centered, but he wanted Cossette to be accessible to the public and engage with the world. Animestyle magazine editor-in-chief Yūichirō Oguro, in his interview with Shinbo, likened the series to The SoulTaker, calling the atmosphere of the two series "exactly the same." Viewers praised the series' style, with admiration emphasized on the color design and "inventive imagery and camera tricks."

=== Shaft ===
==== Team Shinbo era (2004–2010) ====
In 1995, Shaft managing director Mitsutoshi Kubota asked Shinbo to direct episodes to the studio's first original television work, Juuni Senshi Bakuretsu Eto Ranger, but was unable to due to conflicts with his schedule. Although unable to participate in Eto Ranger, Shaft was later gross outsourced to for an episode of Shinbo's The SoulTaker. Later, in 2004, Shaft's first president and studio founder Hiroshi Wakao retired from his position, and Kubota succeeded him as president. According to Shinbo, Nippon Victor producer Hiroyuki Birukawa, whom Shinbo worked with on Metal Fighter Miku, approached him with the idea of directing an adaptation of Tsukuyomi: Moon Phase, but did not have an animation studio in mind. Shinbo liked the studio's work on The SoulTaker, so he recommended Shaft and attempted to get a hold of Kubota through the studio's phone line, but was given the answering machine on several occasions. Kubota eventually heard about the offer and accepted it, citing the answering machine issue as comically bad timing due to the staff always being out when Shinbo called. Kubota, now the studio's president, wanted to transform Shaft into a studio with recognizable characteristics and visual flair that made its productions distinct from the works of others in the industry; and Shinbo, whom Kubota had seen several works of (in specific Starship Girl Yamamoto Yohko, The SoulTaker, and Le Portrait de Petit Cossette), was a director capable of leading that transformation.

Shinbo chief directed Tsukuyomi: Moon Phase (assisted by Toshimasa Suzuki) that year. He believed he shouldn't add much of his signature style to the series due to the change in genre from his previous works, and that he should instead focus on "making things properly", but was asked by the series' sponsors to add some of his aesthetics anyway. The series, which Shinbo described as "moe", was challenging due to the fact that he didn't understand "moe" at the time, so he took great care in receiving help from staff members more experienced with the aesthetics of moe. In particular, previous collaborator Shin Oonuma was invited to Shaft by Shinbo due to the former's ability to utilize digital technology, and the fact that his fondness of "gal games" and "moe anime" ultimately helped Shinbo with the series' aesthetics of "moe." Kubota knew that Shinbo had worked several times with scriptwriter Mayori Sekijima, and so they asked him to take on the role of series composition writer. Shinbo also wanted the visual aspect of the series to have a solid foundation, and he specifically wanted someone with strong art setting (美術設定) sensibilities to do the work; however, he didn't want someone from a background art studio to take on the role (which was common), and instead wanted an associate of Shaft to handle the work. Kubota suggested Nobuyuki Takeuchi (who worked with Shaft often) to act as the "visual director." A few of the directing staff for Shaft's projects for the next several years also worked on the project to some degree, including the aforementioned Takeuchi and Oonuma; and also Tatsuya Oishi and Ryouki Kamitsubo. Oishi previously worked with Shaft as an animator on several works, as well as with Shinbo on an episode of Yu Yu Hakusho, so his connections with both converged into his work as an episode director on Tsukuyomi, which was a new experience for him. Shinbo attributed Tsukuyomi as the foundation for his experimentalism with Shaft, and that without the work's out-of-the-ordinary approach, it would not have been possible to collaborate with other like-minded people; and it was because of that approach that they gained recognition, thus allowing for such creators to come together.

The earlier Magical Girl Lyrical Nanoha series also served as the vessel for the eventual collaboration between Shinbo and animator Kazuhiro Oota. Oota, who was a fan of Shinbo's prior works (Tenamonya Voyagers, Starship Girl Yamamoto Yohko, and The SoulTaker), was given the opportunity to act as animation director for two of Nanoha's outsourced episodes (episode 4 and 7). He later found out that Shinbo was directing Tsukuyomi at the same time as Nanoha, and watched the first episode, which he though was closer to Shinbo's style than Nanoha. He also found out that an acquaintance of his worked at Shaft, and got their phone number to join the Tsukuyomi team and Shaft. At that point, Shinbo was already aware of Oota and praised his work on Nanoha as being some of the best outsourced episodes he had seen while working on TV anime, and was surprised that Oota wanted to join Shaft to work on Tsukuyomi with him. For his work on Tsukuyomi, Shinbo chose Oota to be the character designer of his next work at Shaft.

Shaft's logo since 2017

In 2005, Shinbo and Oonuma worked together as series co-directors for the first time on Pani Poni Dash!, and Oota designed the characters. Shinbo wanted to expand on the visual cross-cutting (in which buildings are spliced on the camera as if it was a stage production) techniques Nobuyuki Takeuchi used in Tsukuyomi while also expanding on other experimentalist ideas from the series. He also wanted the staff members to showcase their own abilities while keeping consistent direction, a philosophy he compared to Time Bokan (1975). Another idea for the team came from eyecatches, which weren't new to either Shaft or Shinbo, but the concept of using eyecatches consistently arose when the planners from King Records asked the staff to include the character Behoimi in every episode, but because she did not show up often early on in the story, it was decided that they would compromise by putting her in the eyecatches. Shinbo attributed part of Pani Poni Dash!'s success to King Records producer Atsushi Moriyama and TV Tokyo manager Fukashi Azuma, who fought for Shaft's ability to use certain references and parodies, thus giving the team a higher degree of overall freedom.

Between 2006 and 2009, Shinbo directed several more television series and OVAs with various in-house and freelance directors. In 2006: Negima!? with Oonuma; in 2007: Hidamari Sketch with Ryouki Kamitsubo, Sayonara, Zetsubou-Sensei (assisted by Naoyuki Tatsuwa), as well as serving as a supervisor on Oonuma's own series Ef: A Tale of Memories and its sequel Ef: A Tale of Melodies; in 2008: (Zoku) Sayonara, Zetsubou-Sensei and its sequel (Zan) Sayonara, Zetsubou-Sensei with Yukihiro Miyamoto (again assisted by Tatsuwa), and Hidamari Sketch x 365 (assisted by production director Tatsuya Oishi); and in 2009: Maria Holic with Miyamoto; as well as Natsu no Arashi! with Oonuma, and its sequel Natsu no Arashi! Akinai-chū with Oonuma and Kenichi Ishikura. Between 2008 and 2010, the studio also produced a series of Negima! Magister Negi Magi OVAs with several guest directors working under Shinbo including Miyamoto, Tomoyuki Itamura, Hiroaki Tomita, Kōbun Shizuno, Tomokazu Tokoro, and Tatsufumi Itō, and a series of Sayonara, Zetsubou-Sensei OVAs directed by Shinbo and Miyamoto (assisted by Tatsuwa as well).

When he received the offer to direct the adaptation of Ume Aoki's Hidamari Sketch, Shinbo was initially worried that the viewer would change the channel if it was too boring as a slice of life work. However, he had seen Aria the Animation, which was a story that lacked a particularly singular narrative or any conflict, which surprised him due to its success. Knowing Aria's success, he was convinced not to overdo himself on Hidamari Sketch, but he also found himself conflicted on whether or not he should use experimental visual elements like live-action photography and manga-like backgrounds. Aoki thought that Shinbo's visual experimentation with Hidamari Sketch was balanced by the stability of the show's structure and his comprehension of the characters, and felt that he truly understood her work. Character designer Yoshiaki Itou and Oishi (who served as production designer in the second season) were in charge of the series' general art design of the series, and Shinbo's orders consisted of each of the girl's rooms shown only at selective angles with few "cameras". The show also exclusively featured mostly women as the series scriptwriters and composition writers, as Shinbo thought that the words men and women would use in depicting everyday life would be different. Even though many of the scenes and conversations lacked punchlines, he and the writers thought that it would be okay as long the characters were having fun, and Shinbo imagined the series as being like a conversational drama similar to Yappari Neko ga Suki. The series was also Shinbo and art director Hisaharu Iijima's first time working together since Le Portrait de Petit Cossette. Iijima was no longer employed by Studio Easter and had started his own company, Ryuubidou, which Shinbo found the website for decided to ask him to work on the show.

For Sayonara, Zetsubou-Sensei, Shinbo wanted to make something unique but in line with the manga. He told Oishi, who was in charge of the opening, to not make something too offensive; and he decided to work with Tatsuwa as the assistant director and Hiroki Yamamura from Studio Pastoral as the chief animation director alongside character designer Hideyuki Morioka. Tatsuwa and Yamamura were both fans of the source material's author, Kōji Kumeta, and Shinbo believed that they could help him to understand the parts that he didn't get. Shinbo also thought that Yamamura's drawings tended to appeal to women which he wanted in order to appeal to a broader audience.

Ef: A Tale of Memories and its sequel series Ef: A Tale of Melodies were the first (and only) series produced at Shaft that involved Shinbo outside of a directing role for the next 13 years. Oonuma was instead granted complete freedom as director of the project, a first in his career; and Shinbo instead oversaw certain aspects of the production as supervisor and gave advice to Oonuma. According to Oonuma, Shinbo generally helped oversee some of the screenplay and storyboards; but the most significant contribution in his opinion was storyboarding the second episode, which let Oonuma understand Shinbo's ideas more directly than words could describe. The end of the episode features a sequence in which one of the heroines, Shindo, is revealed to have a memory disorder. The storyboards did not advise on the direction of the scene, and during the editing stage, Shinbo advised that the direction correlate with that theme, and so Oonuma used heavy cutting through various flashback sequences. Oonuma considered the sequence to be broadly influential to his future directorial projects.

A second season of Hidamari Sketch with the title Hidamari Sketch x 365 was produced the year after, with Tatsuya Oishi taking on the role of production director following Kamitsubo's leave as chief director. Oishi was already involved with the first season as an episode director, storyboard artist, and one of the art designers, and Shinbo wanted Oishi to have more input in the second series, so he became involved as the "production director" and had a hand in checking episodes that he wasn't otherwise involved in.

Although the two had never worked together before, Natsu no Arashi! manga author Jin Kobayashi attended Shinbo's drinking and book reading sessions, where they would read other works. Eventually, it was decided that Shaft, Shinbo, and Oonuma would make an adaptation of Kobayashi's manga. Shinbo felt that one of the most particular aspects of the series was its portrayal of summer (thus, "natsu" in the title), so he asked Oonuma to come up with a way of emphasizing the summer heat. After he discussed with the art team, Oonuma decided that the shading and lit areas by the sun would have substantially different contrasts in order to bring out a feeling of harsh heat from the sunlight. Shinbo himself contributed to the look of the lighting itself, which takes the form of linear and geometric shapes, a style that art director Yuuji Ikeda influenced him with when they worked together on Marude Dameo. Although he had used such a style in previous works, Natsu no Arashi! was the first time it was implemented in the foundation of one.

For Maria Holic, the team made the conscious decision of directing the series using some of the techniques and aesthetics headed by Dezaki, such as his "three pan" (三回パン) shots technique, which show the subject three times for dramatic effect; and the aesthetics of shōjo manga, like Aim for the Ace! and The Rose of Versailles (which had adaptations by Dezaki). Tatsuwa was brought on board as the assistant director and he was mainly given responsibility of overseeing the production site as well as checking layouts and other miscellaneous jobs; while Miyamoto was responsible for managing the processing during production. Shinbo suggested early on in pre-production that the screenwriters should add more monologues than what the original manga contained, which posed a problem as the runtime for episodes would often go over the limit. Minari Endou, the original author, joked that most authors would ask whether certain parts could be kept or added rather than suggesting where to make cuts to fit the runtime as was in her case.

In April 2008, an anime adaptation of Nisio Isin's novel Bakemonogatari was announced. Shinbo was originally the only director, but he requested that Tatsuya Oishi work with him as series director. Previous Shinbo collaborator Akio Watanabe was also brought onto the project as character designer and chief animation director, as well as art director Hisaharu Iijima. According to Watanabe, he was originally not asked to draw designs for Bakemonogatari, but instead for an adaptation Shaft was planning for the Zaregoto series. He had received the call from Mitsutoshi Kubota for the work, but was called sometime later to say that they had changed their mind and would adapt Bakemonogatari instead (though Shaft, Shinbo, and Watanabe later worked on Zaregoto as well). Several episodes were notably storyboarded and directed by members outside of Shaft's usual connections, one of whom was episode 10's storyboard artist Ei Aoki. Iwakami introduced Shinbo to the first The Garden of Sinners film, which Aoki directed, and he liked it and requested Aoki storyboard an episode of Bakemonogatari.

Shinbo initially thought that adapting such a work, in which characters speak for a large portion of the runtime, would be difficult. Pondering this, he thought about Isao Takahata's 1979 anime series Anne of Green Gables and its portrayal of mundane and daily life, much of which also consisted of a lot of dialogue. From there, he believed that if he presented Monogatari in a similar way, it would avoid getting tired of it. He had also chosen Tatsuya Oishi to act as series director due to the latter's stylistic affinity for interesting colors and his ability to use cool lettering and Kanji in the animated medium, which he thought were beneficial in adapting such a unique novel series. He wanted to keep the dialogue more-or-less the same, despite the amount of dialogue in the work, which would be interesting as an anime; though, this philosophy in making the work proved to be somewhat problematic, as Aniplex producer Atsuhiro Iwakami planned the series as a 13-episode work. Enough content existed in the original novel to add another episode in the Suruga Monkey and Mayoi Snail arcs that would be otherwise cut following Iwakami's 13-episode plan. Despite the episode limit, Shinbo was adamant that the anime wouldn't truly be Bakemonogatari without the inclusion of Koyomi and Mayoi's banter and dialogue in the Mayoi Snail arc, for example. The total episode count was then increased to 15, but a separate problem of TV airing came into question: how would the team air 15-episodes in a television slot that only had room for the original 13? To Shinbo's fortune, the 12th episode of the series was the date between Koyomi and Hitagi, which he wanted to dedicate the entire episode to anyway; and in doing so, the rest of the Tsubasa Cat arc was moved to an online release in 2010, and only 12 episodes were broadcast on TV in 2009.

Bakemonogatari received cult fame and was widely praised for its aesthetics upon its initial release, and is regarded by some critics as the series that pushed Shaft "into fame", with writers from Funimation describing it as a "hit." Whereas most of the studio's works prior to Bakemonogatatari are described as being closer to comedies (such as the Hidamari Sketch franchise, Pani Poni Dash!, and Tsukuyomi: Moon Phase), the series was described as darker in nature. Stylistically, Bakemonogatari is praised considered to be a "visually striking" production by various critics, and in 2017, the Tokyo Anime Award Festival selected Bakemonogatari as the best anime of 2009. The series was also an immediate financial success, as indicated by the 6th Blu-ray (BD) release breaking records for the number of copies sold on its first day.

==== Madoka Magica era (2010–2013) ====
In 2010, Shinbo directed Arakawa Under the Bridge and its sequel Arakawa Under the Bridge x Bridge with Miyamoto. Although a comedy series, he and sound director Youta Tsuruoka intended for the series to have a "mature" feeling, which included choosing sound effects not always representational of the series' comedy and insisting to composer Masaru Yokoyama to keep the feeling of the song "Memphis Underground" by Herbie Mann in mind. Although a romantic comedy, the two felt that it required less "childishness" in its presentation. Tsuruoka believed the experience of also being the sound director for Bakemonogatari helped with his work on Arakawa, as both series utilize few setting changes (with Arakawa primarily being set on a riverbank and Monogatari featuring many long scenes set in singular rooms) and Shinbo often using short cuts of animation in both. Shinbo and writer Deko Akao also reorganized parts of the manga to fit the anime medium while paying close attention not to inconsistently portray the characters and their relationships, and the two also received permission from the original author, Hikaru Nakamura, to add lines of dialogue to characters who are otherwise silent in the manga.

Shinbo expressed desire to produce another magical girl series in various casual conversations because he thought there were improvements to be made in his portrayal of the genre from Magical Girl Lyrical Nanoha. Atsuhiro Iwakami heard about Shinbo wanting to produce a magical girl series around Bakemonogatari's production, which spawned the initial development of Puella Magi Madoka Magica. Iwakami decided early on that they would produce an original project to give Shinbo more freedom in his directing, and to develop an anime that could appeal to a wider audience than the usual demographic that the magical girl genre was aimed towards, intending for the series to be accessible to "the general anime fan." Gen Urobuchi and Ume Aoki were suggested by Iwakami to work on the project as the screenwriter and original character designer, respectively, and the four (Shinbo, Urobuchi, Aoki, and Shaft) collectively created the series as the "Magica Quartet", with the first meeting between the core staff held in October of 2008. The team agreed that the work would have a copious amount of blood and a "heavy" storyline that was unique in comparison to other magical girl series. Urobuchi's tentative title while working on the project was Magical Girl Apocalypse Madoka Magica (魔法少女黙示録 まどかマギカ), and the staff got used to calling it simply "Madoka Magica" while working on it. Eventually, the working title was proposed as the actual title, with the "Magical Girl Apocalypse" part dropped, but Shinbo was adamant about retaining "magical girl" as part of the title. Yukihiro Miyamoto was put on the project as series director alongside Shinbo 3 to 4 months before the series was aired, and animation troupe Gekidan Inu Curry, old classmates of Miyamoto's who were working on Sayonara, Zetsubou-Sensei, were brought on to design the "Alternate Space" world. Shinbo didn't have an idea for who would compose the series' music, but Iwakami suggested Cossette composer Yuki Kajiura; and after listening to a sample she provided, Shinbo believed she was a perfect match for the series.

Urobuchi was initially reluctant as he didn't know how to write about magical girls, and had never thought about it, so he did research by watching Shinbo's previous magical girl work Magical Girl Lyrical Nanoha. He also watched Hidamari Sketch, directed by Shinbo and based on original character designer Aoki's manga, to try and grasp what kind of characters to write. One of the themes he noted was the theme of "friendship", but was still uncertain as to how to write Madoka Magica. Afterwards, he saw Shinbo's gothic OVA Le Portrait de Petite Cossette and decided that he wanted to mix the "disturbing" and "mysterious" atmosphere of Cossette with Aoki's cute characters. With Gekidan Inu Curry's help, he believed that the two series were successfully linked together. Shinbo attributed his success with the series to the culmination of projects that he had been involved with up until that point, especially with Shaft. One particular series was Oonuma's Ef series which—although not involved with as a director, but rather as a supervisor—he described as exemplifying the idea that beautiful or cutely-drawn characters can be mixed with a story featuring heavy themes.

Released in 2011 to critical acclaim, Madoka Magica has been cited by several critics as one of the greatest anime series of the 2010s, and one of the greatest anime series of all time. Shinbo won the best director awards at the 11th Tokyo Anime Award, and the 2011 Newtype Anime Award for his work on Madoka Magica. In 2017, Shinbo was also chosen by Japanese critics as one of the greatest anime directors of all time for his work on Madoka Magica. The series was also a financial success and broke the record for the number of BD volumes sold on the first day (a record previously held by Shinbo's Bakemonogatari) with its 1st BD release, which the series broke again with the following release, and ultimately garnered over ¥40 billion ($400 million) from the sales of related goods by 2013. Retrospectively, anime director Tatsuyuki Nagai considered Madoka to be the culmination of Shinbo's directing works throughout the years, especially in regard to Nanoha and Hidamari, which he believed were essential to its success. The success of the series allowed for it to become a larger franchise, and the following two years a trilogy film series consisting of two recap films with updated animation and a third sequel film, with Shinbo chief directing and Miyamoto directing.

Around the end of the release of the Madoka Magica TV series, Urobuchi and Iwakami had separately decided that they wanted to do more with the story. Urobuchi wrote a script for a new project which had not been planned for any particular release format, and Mitsutoshi Kubota recalled Iwakami saying that it seemed fitting for a theatrical release. The drafted script went through several revisions and was extended from its original 70-minute runtime to its final length of 116 minutes. Shinbo didn't intend to make the scenario itself longer, but requested additions such as the action scene at the beginning of the film. Although Urobuchi's scenario was originally titled "Madoka 2", Shinbo and the staff had difficulty in deciding if the work was to be marketed as a sequel to the previous parts of the franchise. Eventually, it was Iwakami who decided to call it a sequel film. In the meantime, the staff also worked to release a compilation duology of the first season into film format, with Shinbo intending to release it as a compilation film similar to those found in franchises like Space Battleship Yamato. Unlike previous works Shinbo had been involved with, the compilation movies would update the visuals but keep the existing footage otherwise the same, which Shinbo proclaimed he was not good at doing and would rather rethink the storyboards or add new cuts from scratch. To help with the process, Shinbo asked editor Rie Matsubara to create a rough template outlining what parts of the story could be condensed into what sections of the film, and then he made suggestions, cuts, and additions from there. Miyamoto had not yet been asked to act as director of the films (rather than series director) until Mitsutoshi Kubota asked him to when they happened to meet at a convenience store near Shaft. Alternate space designers Gekidan Inu Curry had also become more involved with the production of the films, especially the sequel film, Rebellion, and directly contributed to the addition of scenes (such as the "tea party" scene) and scriptwriting dialogue for Bebe (the witch form of Nagisa Momoe). While Shinbo said that he tends to want to make things more "unusual", Gekidan Inu Curry's designs were amazing enough that it wasn't needed. Gekidan Inu Curry's parts were supported by the film's art director Ken Naitou and analog artist Youichi Nangou, the latter of whom had previously worked for Shinbo as art director of Twilight of the Dark Master and was especially involved with Gekidan Inu Curry's work on the film.

Shinbo and Shaft continued production on a number of other series concurrently between 2010 and 2013. In 2010: Hidamari Sketch x Hoshimittsu with Ishikura, Dance in the Vampire Bund with Masahiro Sonoda, and And Yet the Town Moves (although Tatsuwa is credited as the "assistant director", Shinbo has referred to him as the show's "series director"); in 2011: Katte ni Kaizō with Tatsuwa, Ground Control to Psychoelectric Girl with Miyamoto, Maria Holic Alive with Tomokazu Tokoro (and Ishikura as assistant), Hidamari Sketch x SP, and Mahou Sensei Negima! Anime Finale (assisted by Ishikura). In 2012, he directed Hidamari Sketch x Honeycomb with Yuki Yase, and this year marked the continuation of the Monogatari series with Nisemonogatari and Nekomonogatari: Black, with director Tomoyuki Itamura replacing Tatsuya Oishi. In 2013, Shinbo returned with Itamura for Monogatari Series Second Season, featuring Yase and Tatsuwa as series directors for the Kabukimonogatari and Onimonogatari arcs. Yase also directed the final OVA series in the Hidamari Sketch anime franchise under Shinbo, and Shinbo directed (assisted by Tatsuwa) Sasami-san@Ganbaranai.

Itamura served as the series director of Nisemonogatari due to Shinbo's trust in his capability. Shinbo had been aware of Itamura's work at Shaft since he had joined 3 years prior, and he believed that the second episode of Bakemonogatari (which Itamura had directed) was very good.

Shinbo interpreted the source material for And Yet the Town Moves as being inspired by and written like an older manga series. For that reason, he directed the series as if it was an older anime, using less-common techniques in the modern era of the time like people reflected in objects and fish-eye lenses.

Shinbo noted that both himself and the original author to Ground Control to Psychoelectric Girl, Hitoma Iruma, were male, so he thought the series would've been more interesting if the series composition was instead written from the perspective of a woman. Eventually, Yuniko Ayana was hired to be the series composition writer by request of Shinbo.

==== Mid-to-late 2010s (2014–2018) ====
In 2014, Shinbo directed Nisekoi with Tatsuwa, Mekakucity Actors with Yase, the final arc to Monogatari Series Second Season, Hanamonogatari, with Itamura, and the first arc in Monogatari Series Final Season, Tsukimonogatari also with Itamura. Throughout the next several years, Shinbo continued to direct series with Shaft's other directors, including Gourmet Girl Graffiti (2015) with Tatsuwa, Nisekoi: (2015) with Miyamoto, The Beheading Cycle: The Blue Savant and the Nonsense Bearer (2016–17) with Yase, March Comes In like a Lion (2016–18) with Kenjirou Okada, the film Fireworks (2017) with Nobuyuki Takeuchi (assisted by Seimei Kidokoro), and Fate/Extra: Last Encore (2018) with Miyamoto.

Manga author Chika Umino was a fan of Shinbo's works with Shaft and stated that she did not want an adaptation of March Comes In like a Lion unless it was a Shaft-Shinbo production. Her editor from Hakusensha, Ryou Tomoda, asked about the possibility of receiving an adaptation from the director and studio, but was told it would be impossible. However, the son of shogi player Torahiko Tanaka, Makoto Tanaka, who worked at Tohokushinsha Film, was a fan of Umino's manga, and approached Tomoda about adapting the anime. From there, Tomoda met with recently promoted Aniplex CEO Atsuhiro Iwakami about the prospects of a Shaft-Shinbo adaptation, and Iwakami met with Kubota and Shinbo, and they agreed to the project. Umino had originally wanted the series to have a similar aesthetic to Bakemonogatari, which she was a fan of, but Shinbo said that it wasn't a good idea; instead of the Bakemonogatari-esque background art Umino had in mind, for example, the series was made with a watercolor-style. Umino also wanted Akio Watanabe to design the characters for animation, but the schedule didn't align (instead, Shaft animator Nobuhiro Sugiyama designed the characters).

Planning and produce[sic] (Note: "produce" (プロデュース), credited separately from the film's "producers" (プロデューサー).) Genki Kawamura gave permission for Shinbo to make an anime film adaptation of Shunji Iwai's live-action television film Fireworks in 2013. Iwai suggested scriptwriter Hitoshi Ōne for the film, and Kawamura was similarly eyeing his work. At the same time, Kawamura had seen Bakemonogatari and Puella Magi Madoka Magica, and was interested in working with Shinbo and Shaft. Initial planning for the film began with 7 to 8 members of the production team (including Ōne, Shinbo, Iwai, and Kawamura) meeting every two weeks for about half a year to discuss ideas. Although Shinbo said that he didn't contribute much to the discussion, Oone said that it was Shinbo's idea to change the age of the characters from elementary school students (as they are in the original film) to junior high students. Shinbo struggled to decide on whether the characters should be more comedic or realistic, but after reading Ōne's screenplay, decided that it would be okay to have a little of both, especially since he felt that the character designs (designed by Watanabe) suited such a mixture.

The second arc to Monogatari Series Final Season, Owarimonogatari I, was released in 2015, adapting the first two of three volumes of the original Owarimonogatari novel. Every year thereafter, new series in the franchise were produced, with Koyomimonogatari being released in 2016, and Owarimonogatari II being released in 2017, all of which were co-directed with Itamura. At the same time, however, Tatsuya Oishi had been busy working on the Kizumonogatari trilogy, which had started 4 to 6 years prior, and also involved Shinbo as chief director. The same year as Kizumonogatari III and Owarimonogatari II's release, however, Itamura left the studio, and Oishi seemingly disappeared from the anime industry after directing the opening animation to a video game released in 2018.

Both Itamura's and Oishi's absences as series directors led to Shinbo seemingly directing Zoku Owarimonogatari, the final novel in Final Season, by himself. The season, initially released as a film in 2018, is the only arc in the Monogatari series directed solely by Shinbo, solely by one director, and the first time he had directed a project without assistants or co-directors since 2011 (Hidamari Sketch x SP). He mentioned that many of the staff members by this point had been with the series since its beginnings, but that many had also joined partway through; nonetheless, he believed that the episode directors were able to show their individuality and expressions more strongly than in previous installments in the series. One of the instructions he gave to the storyboard artists for the season was to lower the number of camera cuts compared to previous seasons, as well, in order to create a more relaxed tempo. In 2019, he stated that the Monogatari series was his life's work, and that he wanted to continue adapting the series and Nisio Isin's other novels.

In 2016, Shinbo also expanded his work outside of Shaft alongside light novel author Reki Kawahara and novelist and scriptwriter Ichiro Okouchi as shareholders and collaborators to the then newly-established Egg Firm production studio.

==== 2020s ====
Shinbo and studio Shaft took a hiatus from major animation works in 2019. The only major product from the team that year was the televised release of Zoku Owarimonogatari. The following year, they returned for the adaptation of the spin-off Madoka Magica series Magia Record: Puella Magi Madoka Magica Side Story. The series was not directed by Shinbo, however; instead, Doroinu (one of the two members of Gekidan Inu Curry) served as chief director, and Shinbo served as animation supervisor. Shinbo took a step back from acting as a director on the series for the purpose of separating the original Madoka Magica and Magia Record in order to clearly express that Magia Record is a spin-off series, rather than a continuation of the original series. As "animation supervisor", Shinbo often made suggestions and supervised the work at scenario meetings and the post-recording sessions, and he mainly assisted with setting up the connections between Magia Record and Madoka Magica. According to Aniplex producer Tatsuya Ishikawa, Shinbo's opinion served as guidelines for the staff so that they did not carelessly omit explanations and logic that would otherwise confuse the audience. Though Shinbo said he did not interefere much with the staff, he did contribute ideas, like one that eventually led to the creation of the anime-original character Kuroe. It was through Shinbo's request to Doroinu that the anime not follow the flow of the game due to a difference in mediums being untranslatable that also led to the anime ultimately pursuing an original story.

In 2021, he returned to the director's chair with an adaptation of Nisio Isin's Pretty Boy Detective Club, with Hajime Ootani as director (and Kenjirou Okada assisting). In April of the same year, it was announced that Puella Magi Madoka Magica: Rebellion (2013), the final film in the Madoka Magica trilogy remake, would receive a sequel with Shinbo returning as chief director and Miyamoto as director, and the second season of Magia Record were announced to be airing in July, again with Doroinu chief directing and Shinbo acting as animation supervisor, but with Miyamoto as director. A "final" season consisting of four episodes with the same staff premiered in March 2022 after a delay from fall 2021.

In 2024, an adaptation of the Off Season and Monster Season series of novels of Nisio Isin's Monogatari series was announced, with Shinbo, Shaft, and Akio Watanabe returning to their respective roles; and with the debut of Midori Yoshizawa as series director, who was an assistant director on Magia Record. Aniplex producer Tatsuya Ishikawa approached Shaft with the idea of continuing the Monogatari anime in the fall of 2022, with the studio agreeing. Yoshizawa was chosen to direct by studio president Kubota and had been a part of the project since the scriptwriting stage. Shinbo relied on Yoshizawa for her art design sensibilities and decided to make changes to some of the formats from her predecessors. The previous seasons in the series had used eyecatches to a limited degree, and Shinbo wanted Yoshizawa to use more freely with Off & Monster Season. For the Nademonogatari arc (second arc in the season), he wanted the eyecatches to act like the spines on Dragon Ball volumes; and for Shinobumonogatari (fourth and final arc), he wanted the eyecatches to be like a tour of famous areas in Japan. As a director at Shaft, Shinbo had generally been responsible or co-responsible (often with the other series directors) for much of the storyboard checks and corrections throughout various works, but he often delegates the task of storyboarding to other people entirely, with his most recent storyboard credits being short promotional videos and commercials like the Bakemonogatari manga PV released in 2022 and the Madoka Magica Concept Movie in 2015, but he had not storyboarded a full television episode since Hidamari Sketch x SP in 2011 (which he received credit for under the pseudonym "Satoko Shindou"). For Wazamonogatari (the third arc in the season), Shinbo was not originally in charge of storyboarding the arc, but ultimately revised the storyboards to the point that he received co-credit for both episodes under Shaft's collective pseudonym of Fuyashi Tou.

== Influences and style ==
=== Influences ===
Shinbo listed Hiroshi Motomiya, Ikki Kajiwara, Go Nagai, and Shotaro Ishinomori among the manga authors that he liked whose works, such as Kajiwara's Tomorrow's Joe, were big influences on him. Their usage of brightly colored backgrounds and compositions influenced the way he in which he, prior to directing, thought he could make a work visually interesting; Nagai's work, for example, used ostentatious red-and-blue paneling, which he described influencing his own colored paneling as a director. The overarching narrative of The SoulTaker—in which the protagonist Kyosuke Date looks for his sister—was inspired by Motomiya's manga Ore no Sora; and the set designs for Tsukuyomi: Moon Phase were inspired by the sets from TV dramas of the 1970s like Kitaro Tareuchi Family and It's Time. Mystery elements found in The SoulTaker and Le Portrait de Petit Cossette were also broadly influenced by the written works of Edogawa Ranpo, whom Shinbo started reading the works of while in elementary school.

One of Shinbo's earliest influences from the anime industry itself was director Osamu Dezaki whom he, and fellow director Kunihiko Ikuhara, have been described as direct descendants of Dezaki's particular affinity for exaggerated and grandiose compositional staging. He has also made the conscious decision of directing using techniques headed by Dezaki, such as Dezaki's "three pan" (三回パン) shots, on works like Maria Holic. This ties in with Shinbo's emphasis on visual representation, style, and "good pictures" in his works, rather than a focus on traditional storytelling or strong narratives, to which he has said that he "hates making ordinary stuff." This philosophy ties in with his interest in non-traditional narrative structures: in a traditional henshin magical girl series, the first episode of the series might end after the protagonist beats the villain of the episode succeeding the protagonist's henshin transformation; however, in Magical Girl Lyrical Nanoha, screenwriter Masaki Tsuzuki had structured the first episode to end with the transformation itself, which Shinbo said influenced him in thinking that—in the modern age of anime—conventional formats no longer had to be adhered to. Shinbo cited Yoshimitsu Oohashi, whom he worked with several times between 1995 and 1997, as the reason for the realistic qualities in his characters.

Some artists Shinbo likes or has taken inspiration from include Yukinobu Hoshino (in particular his black-and-white pattern style), Hokusai, Tadanori Yokoo, Pablo Picasso, Egon Schiele, Gustav Klimt, and Andrew Wyeth. American comics and bande dessinée have also had an influence on Shinbo's works, in particular New Hurricane Polymar, which he wanted to base the aesthetic off of the former. He referenced Mike Mignola as one American comic artist he likes.

=== Style ===
Examples of "bird's eye view", "worm's eye view", and "smacking" shots (from top to bottom) used in Le Portrait de Petit Cossette.

As a director, Shinbo said that his style is not entirely the product of his own innovation, but rather a mix of his own experimentations, as well as techniques and ideas from those he has worked with throughout his career. Artistic motifs unique to Shinbo include chess-like designed columns and colored backgrounds; and he commonly uses uncolored or desaturated foreground characters over oversaturated and brighter-colored backgrounds. Shinbo also prominently uses stained glass and other gothic facets for effect in both serious and psychological sequences, and comedy-orientated scenes. Aside from unique compositions, Shinbo also uses a variety of abnormal angles, which was one of the reasons he hired Akio Watanabe for the Starship Girl Yamamoto Yohko TV series (alongside his "realistic" but "cute" drawings). He commonly uses "worm's eye view" shots (あおり, or "low-angle shots"), "bird's eye view" shots (俯瞰, or "high-angle shots"), and foreground "smacking" (ナメ). The latter, foreground smacking, is a visual technique that places an object or person in front of the subject, and thus has a particular sub-framing effect on the composition of the scene; which was a technique he found interest in while watching works such as Hideo Gosha's Jekyll & Hide, and which he learned from animator Mamoru Sasaki while working on New Hurricane Polymar.

Shinbo's own style is largely the basis for Shaft's house style, but Shinbo's style itself is not the sole foundation for the studio's style, as it's more of a "collaboration between Shaft and SIMBO [sic]". This style has been described as including pictures taken from real life cut into scenes, art shifts, beat panels (despite working in the animation medium), kabuki sound effects, textures that remain stationary when the textured object moves, showing symbols or defining parts of a character (ahoge, hair decorations, foreheads, or other symbols) in place of character shots during dialogue, written text in place (a style used mainly by Tatsuya Oishi, which was incorporated into Shinbo and other Shaft director's visual lexicons), precise use of fan service, and head-turning cinematography (head-tilting). Shinbo stated that he felt it to be unnecessary to add "mob" characters (characters in the backgrounds that don't interact with the cast) and tends to avoid adding them at all in his series. However, he said that he sometimes went against this; for example, in Sayonara, Zetsubou-Sensei, he included faceless background characters, and added Kanji text, floral patterns, and other stylizations that he attributed to Oishi (albeit, Oishi's faceless background characters were, themselves, inspired by Shinbo's).

Much of Shinbo's early style was founded on abstract coloring, and Oonuma regards the most influential aspect of Shinbo's style on him as the "power of color." Director Yasuomi Umetsu, Nippon Victor producer Hiroyuki Birukawa, and animator Kazuhiro Oota have all noted Shinbo's particular taste in color as well. However, Shinbo said he had stopped using such abstract colors in his works, part of which was due to his trust in Hitoshi Hibino, a veteran color designer at Shaft, who disliked when Shinbo colored bishōjo characters abstractly.

Shaft was open to Shinbo's experimentation, and he said they "[put] up with my requests wonderfully", which gave him and the staff newfound creative control and availability for artistic expression over their projects. Shinbo already had a philosophy of "mix[ing] participating staffer’s feelings, not only mine" prior to his collaborations with Shaft, so the studio's work ethic matched well with his ideas, and has also stated that it's the opinions of the staff and the studio's atmosphere that contribute to the works he directs more than himself; though, Masahiro Mukai, who worked under Shinbo on Puella Magi Madoka Magica and Arakawa Under the Bridge, noted that many of the decisions Shinbo made as a director were solely based on whether or not he thought certain ideas were cool, or whether or not he had grown tired of them. Akio Watanabe said that Shinbo was always peculiar about making works with bishōjo characters, but that his style in doing so changed when he went to Shaft. Rather than be dramatic over comedic, Shinbo's works at Shaft tend to take the opposite and act more comedic rather than dramatic, which he says is due to the audience of the time not caring much for serious works; but that it's also due to the fact that Shinbo considers himself to be a "container" which the members of Shaft operate within, and that within said container the members of Shaft are able to do a lot. He's said that if he was to make something outside of Shaft, it would probably end up like The SoulTaker or Le Portrait de Petit Cossette.

Part of the stylism of Shinbo's work at Shaft, and his style beginning with the 2000s in general, is founded on an idea of taking "safety measures." Due to shortages of staff and the fact that more anime started to get produced in the early 2000s, animation resources became scarce, so certain cuts of animation that creators such as Shinbo wanted to make were not feasible from a production standpoint. For that reason, Shinbo approached the idea of maintaining a certain level of quality with the idea of time constraints and limited manpower in mind—in other words, making the work look good and "my film" (自分のフィルム) despite the constraints. At the same time, Shinbo continued to adhere to his philosophy of making interesting images so that the audience (and himself) wouldn't get bored, and he has made a point of constantly trying to show new or intriguing things with every work or every episode. While working within the context of appealing to and working with the source material he is adapting, for a work like Arakawa Under the Bridge, which features a mainly fixed setting, Shinbo opted to continue engaging visual interest by changing the color of the grass or using different bridges as models for the titular subject. Shinbo also emphasizes his reliance on others to do things that he cannot and the input of other creators who understand the kind of "film" he wants to make who also bring in their own ideas. Shaft animation producer Yasuhiro Okada stated that his works often take on the challenge of combining new things and that he was skilled at bringing out ideas that would not normally come out during the production process. While various creators have been influenced by Shinbo, according to Okada, longtime collaborative director Yukihiro Miyamoto is the best director capable of absorbing and expressing Shinbo's "flavor."

Shinbo orders the background music for some of his works—for example The SoulTaker, Natsu no Arashi!, and Bakemonogatari—in the styles of the horror films The Exorcist (1973) and Suspiria (1977)

== Personal life ==
During Shinbo's days as a vocational school student, he and friends often visited a local coffee shop where they would play video games. According to him, he was so good at BurgerTime (1982), that he was often called "Sensei" (先生, teacher). His favorite video game, however, is Mystery Dungeon: Shiren the Wanderer (1995), which he was taught to play by colleagues Kanta Kamei and Fumihiko Takayama.

He was an avid smoker for part of his life, but one day got a cold and stopped smoking for about two weeks. He bragged about it to Mitsutoshi Kubota and became determined to quit smoking altogether, saying he wouldn't smoke again until a second season of Pani Poni Dash! was announced.

== Legacy ==
Throughout his career, Shinbo has both mentored and influenced numerous creators throughout the industry both in and out of Shaft. In the 90s and early 2000s, he influenced the likes of Masami Shimoda, Katsuichi Nakayama, Yoshimitsu Ohashi, Masashi Ishihama, Shintarou Inokawa, Yasuhiro Takemoto, and Keizō Kusakawa.

Toshimasa Suzuki referred to Shinbo as the catalyst for Shaft's identity as a "directing company" (演出の会社). Among the directors he has mentored and influenced at Shaft are: Suzuki, Shin Oonuma, Tatsuya Oishi, Nobuyuki Takeuchi, Koutarou Tamura, Kenichi Ishikura, Takashi Kawabata, Ryouki Kamitsubo, Shinichi Omata, Masahiro Mukai, Yuki Yase, Naoyuki Tatsuwa, Tomoyuki Itamura, Yukihiro Miyamoto, Hajime Ootani, and Kenjirou Okada.

However, Shinbo's influence at Shaft extends to more than just the directors who have worked for or with the studio. Character designer and animator Kazuya Shiotsuki described his generation from the studio as the "Children of Shinbo" (新房チルドレン) due to the values and preferences that he brought that influenced the mindsets of those at the company.

== Notes ==
=== Web citations ===
- Hirota, Keisuke (December 25, 2021). 新作アニメ作品を制作中の梅津泰臣が語る「これまで」と「これから」【アニメ業界ウォッチング第85回】 [Yasuomi Umetsu, Who Is Working on a New Animated Work, Talks About the 'Past' and 'Future' (Anime Industry Watching No. 85)]. Akiba Souken. Archived from the original on December 9, 2022.
- Maeda, Hisashi; Hiraiwa, Shinsuke (2007). アニメ新表現宣言！新房監督作品の奥にアニメ表現の最先端を見た！ [Declaration of a New Expression for Anime! I saw the Cutting Edge of Anime Expression in Director Shinbo's Work!] (in Japanese). Tamon Creative.
- Marumoto, Daisuke (2018). 新房昭之監督インタビュー [Director Akiyuki Shinbo Interview]. Natalie (in Japanese).
- Rubin, Lucy Paige (2017). Between Comedy and Despair: The House Style of Studio Shaft (Bachelor of the Arts). Wesleyan University.
- Watanabe, Yumiko (2010). 新房監督のアニメ論 「制約は理由にならない」 【前編】 [Director Shinbo's Anime Theory "Restrictions Are Not a Reason" (Part 1)] (in Japanese). ASCII.

=== Book citations ===
- Aniplex (2021). Pretty Boy Detective Club Vol. 5 Special Booklet. Aniplex.
- Kizawa, Yukito; Nakamoto, Muneo; Yanagi, Yuuichi, eds. (2008). Hidamari Sketch Album. Houbunsha. ISBN 978-4832277403.
- Kizawa, Yukito, ed. (2013). ひだまりスケッチデイズ -TVアニメ公式ガイドブック- [Hidamari Sketch Days: TV Anime Official Guidebook]. Houbunsha. ISBN 978-4832277403.
- Kizawa, Yukito; Takayama, Atsushi; Saitou, Fusano, eds. (2014). 劇場版魔法やまどかマギカ[新編]叛逆の物語公式ガイドブック only you. [Movie Version Puella Magi Madoka Magica [New Edition] Story of Rebellion Official Guidebook only you.]. Houbunsha. ISBN 978-4832244290.
- Kushida, Makoto, ed. (2017). 〈物語〉Febri ["Monogatari" Febri] (in Japanese). Ichijinsha. ASIN B075QWP3NZ.
- Maeda, Hisashi; Nakagami, Yoshikatsu; Kawabata, Takeshi; Nishitani, Nanako (2020). マギアレコード 魔法少女まどか☆マギカ外伝 TVアニメ公式ガイドブック 1巻 [Magia Record Puella Magi Madoka Magica TV Anime Official Guidebook Volume 1] (in Japanese). Houbunsha. ISBN 978-4832272019.
- Magica Quartet (2013). 劇場版 魔法少女まどか☆マギカ [前編]始まりの物語/[後編]永遠の物語 公式ガイドブック with you. [Puella Magi Madoka Magica The Movie [Part 1] Beginning / [Part 2] Eternal Official Guidebook with you.]. Houbunsha. ISBN 978-4832243323.
- Magica Quartet (2011). 魔法少女まどか☆マギカ公式ガイドブック you are not alone. [Puella Magi Madoka Magica Official Guidebook you are not alone.]. Houbunsha. ISBN 978-4832240612.
- Magica Quartet (2021). 魔法少女まどか☆マギカ 10th Anniversary Book Vol. 2 [Puella Magi Madoka Magica 10th Anniversary Book Volume 2]. Houbunsha. ISBN 978-4832273108.
- Misaka, Taiji, ed. (2009). まりあ†ほりっく アニメ公式ガイドブック [Maria Holic Anime Official Guidebook]. Media Factory. ISBN 978-4840129312.
- [Newtype] (January 2011) [December 10, 2011]. Newtype January 2011 (in Japanese). Kadokawa Shoten.
- [Newtype] (December 2012). 劇場版 魔法少女まどか☆マギカ ニュータイプ 2012年12月号増刊 [Newtype Special Edition Puella Magi Madoka Magica the Movie December 2012 Issue] (in Japanese). Kadokawa Shoten. ASIN B009SP8014.
- Nishibe, Maho; Shibayama, Yoshimasa, eds. (December 31, 2012). Hidamari Sketch × Honeycomb Production Note. Shaft.
- Oota, Keiji; Shaft (August 18, 2017). パンフレット 打ち上げ花火、下から見るか?横から見るか? [Pamphlet: Fireworks, Should We See It from the Side or the Bottom?] (in Japanese). Toho.
- Ooya, Masanori, ed. (November 6, 2007). Otona Anime Vol. 6 (in Japanese). Yosensha Mook.
- Shinbo, Akiyuki (July 27, 2012). 新房語 [Shinbogatari] (in Japanese). Ichijinsha. ISBN 978-4758012591.
- Takahashi, Yumi, ed. (November 23, 2019). Akiyuki Shimbo × Shaft Chronicle (in Japanese). Dotcom. ISBN 978-4835457017.
- Square Enix (2010). TVアニメーション「荒川アンダー ザ ブリッジ×ブリッジ 」オフィシャルガイド [TV Animation "Arakawa Under the Bridge" Official Guide]. Square Enix. ISBN 978-4757529625.
