= Tatsuya Oishi (director) =

Japanese animator (born 1970)

Tatsuya Oishi 尾石 達也
- Born: March 28, 1970 (age 56); Aichi Prefecture, Japan
- Occupations: Animator, director, storyboard artist
- Years active: 1991–present
- Employer(s): Studio Junio (1991–1992); Gainax (1993–1997); Shaft (2004–2018)
- Known for: Bakemonogatari; Kizumonogatari

Tatsuya Oishi (Japanese: 尾石 達也, Hepburn: Oishi Tatsuya; born March 28, 1970) is a Japanese director, animator, and storyboard artist. Oishi began his career at Studio Junio as an animator, but gained fame for his work with fellow directors Akiyuki Shinbo and Shin Oonuma at studio Shaft, where he directed the Bakemonogatari television series and its prequel film trilogy Kizumonogatari.

== Career ==
Oishi began working for sub-contracting company Studio Junio in 1991, where he mostly acted as an in-between animator and key animator. Within at least two years, however, he moved to Gainax, where he mainly worked as a sub-contractor for studios like Sunrise. Starting in 1996, he mostly did sub-contracting animation work with Shaft and Toei Animation. In 2002, he did his first episode director and storyboard jobs on Cyborg 009: The Cyborg Soldier.

In 2004, Oishi, Shin Oonuma, and Akiyuki Shinbo joined Shaft as directors, where the three would form the eponymous "Team Shinbo" and largely defined the unique visual artistry and storytelling methods that the studio became known for. Oishi and Oonuma were given important tasks early on, with the former directing many of the opening animations to their series including several for both Pani Poni Dash! and Negima!? (Oonuma's debut as series director under Shinbo). In 2007, Oishi got involved with Shinbo and Ryouki Kamitsubo's adaptation of Hidamari Sketch as both an episode director and storyboard artist, as well as one of the art designers. Through Shinbo's orders, Oishi was responsible for coming up with designs such as the exterior of the Hidamari apartments (including the door coloring style) and the layout designs for its interior. In the second season, Shinbo wanted Oishi more involved with the series, so he took on the role of "production director" and became involved with checking episodes that he wasn't in charge of storyboarding or directing. Although Oishi was only involved with the first two seasons, Shinbo considered Oishi, Kamitsubo, and series art director Hisaharu Iijima to be responsible for the core foundations of the style of Hidamari Sketch.

When Oishi was asked to do the opening for Maria Holic (2009), he expected a solemn tone akin to Maria-sama ga Miteru (2004), but was surprised by its fun beat and had the idea of portraying Mariya teasing Kanako;however, Shinbo told Oishi not to include Kanako herself in the opening, which resulted in Oishi instead using a mannequin as a representation of Kanako. Before making the opening, Oishi saw Gekidan Inu Curry's ending animation for the series beforehand and decided that his desire to not "lose" would act as his motivation in making it. He was interested in directing an episode of the series itself but was unable to, and humorously envied series director Yukihiro Miyamoto and the team for being able to work on the series with Kanako as a character rather than a mannequin.

Later that year, Oishi debuted as a series director with Nisio Isin's Bakemonogatari under Shinbo. Oishi joined the project on request by Shinbo, who believed that Oishi's style of colors and inserts of lettering/Kanji would be stylistically beneficial to the series. Oishi joined the production somewhat late, and described that by the time he was on board, the first 5 episodes had their storyboard orders already completed. Upon its release, the series was immediately met with cult fame, and has been described as the series that pushed Shaft "into fame." Oishi described making Bakemonogatari with the stylism of Jean-Luc Godard and with the intent of showing off his ability. In doing so, he directed it in a way that he felt was "logical", rather than chaotic, and removed things that he personally didn't like or things that didn't meet his sense of beauty; and to that end, the unique images of real-life photography and myriads of lined up or stacked desks were often used as part of the mise-en-scène.

With the success of Bakemonogatari, it was announced that the succeeding novel in Isin's Monogatari series, Kizumonogatari, would be adapted by the studio, and that Oishi and Shinbo would return to direct., and it was announced in 2011 to be a film. Production of the film suffered, however, as four years passed without any updates on the progress of its completion, and it wasn't until 2015 that it was announced that the film would instead be a film trilogy released in 2016 and 2017. Oishi mentioned that one of the problems he had in making the film was his inability to draw storyboards while sitting at his desk at the studio, so he instead wandered around the town with the film scenario and a pencil in hand and he would write down frames and ideas as they came to mind, before eventually returning to the studio to draw the storyboards themselves. Prior to the trilogy's production beginning, in 2011, Japan experienced the 2011 Tōhoku earthquake and tsunami. Oishi was inspired by the disaster and started to incorporate ideas of "living in Japan" and a focus on Japan itself, such as culturally specific iconography and the architectural work of Kenzō Tange. Reactions to the films were very positive, with Nick Creamer stating that the first film was "a breathtaking experience", and he called the second film a "one of a kind." Kizumonogatari chief animation directors Hideyuki Morioka and Hiroki Yamamura, and unit directors Toshimasa Suzuki and Yukihiro Miyamoto, all commented on Oishi's ability to create unique and thoroughly drawn-out storyboards, which Suzuki commented on the particular aspect of Oishi's sense of pacing and its contrast between Kizumonogatari and the earlier Bakemonogatari.

Following the end of Kizumonogatari's production, Oishi directed the opening animation to the 2018 video game Crystar. After that, there was little word of Oishi in the animation production industry for several years until 2023, in which he contributed key animation to Undead Unluck (directed by Shaft-adjacent director Yuki Yase), and when a film compilation version of Kizumonogatari, titled Kizumonogatari: Koyomi Vamp, was announced for an early 2024 showing. Unlike the previous film trilogy, which featured Oishi as director under Shinbo's chief direction, the credits for Koyomi Vamp only credited Oishi as director with an added screenplay credit. Speaking in an interview, Oishi stated that he had been largely working on the compilation film–which features re-recorded dialogue from most of the main characters, a newly composed film score including some of the old music, and new cuts of animation–for the past several years. The film's conception came from Aniplex CEO and former Monogatari series producer Atsuhiro Iwakami, who had proposed to Oishi that he condense the three films into a single movie, but approach it with a different mindset. Iwakami believed it would be interesting to make Kizumonogatari into a "serious vampire story" that cut out some of the comedic and sexual aspects of the trilogy; Oishi, in turn, believed it to be an interesting idea, so he took on the project.

=== Style ===
Under Shinbo, Oishi's style takes derivatives of Shinbo's style as his own, such as Shinbo's usage of faceless "mob" (background) characters. Shinbo made these mob characters faceless, or simply wouldn't include them at all, but Oishi added floral patterns, his name, and other Kanji text on top of those faceless characters, which Shinbo commented was "surprisingly interesting." With the switch from analog to digital in the early-to-mid 2000s, Shinbo noted that Oishi's talent was able to blossom due to the freedoms in creating and switching colors in digital environments. While working on Pani Poni Dash, Oishi attempted to experiment with references to other media, and in one of his episodes tried referencing a drawing of Bakanon's father from Tensai Bakabon by Fujio Akatsuka. However, he was scolded for its inclusion by producers and was told that it might be painted over; though, Oishi instead suggested changing the drawings to flowers, which eventually stuck. Oishi said that he grew up on the works of Osamu Tezuka, which sometimes referenced or outright borrowed drawings from other works, and questioned why Tezuka's works were allowed, but he was not allowed do the same. While Pani Poni Dash series director Shin Oonuma was working in tandem with the rest of the staff on creating references, parodies, and better works, Oishi commented that he worked more alone and away from the Oonuma team. Rather than put in things that other people were suggesting like the Oonuma team, Oishi appealed more to self-indulgence in putting only what he liked into his episodes, such as references to GeGeGe no Kitarō. Oishi experimented with high-saturating colors and 3DCG background environments as well as the interactions between 2D-animated characters and 3D models. Similar to Shinbo's desire to make "good pictures" in his works, Oishi places a particular emphasis on making images that he believes are the best that he can make.

Oishi experimented with coloring in Hidamari Sketch, which he did art design work for across the series alongside Shaft animator Yoshiaki Itou. According to Oishi, Shinbo's orders for the style of the work included limited range of camera "angles" and positioning for the Hidamari apartments and the individual rooms of the main characters. He at first struggled in creating a style that met Shinbo's orders, but eventually decided upon bright colors and ensuring that photographs could be inserted with ease and that light objects could be shown with light lines. In designing the color schemes for each of the character's rooms and their motifs, he paid most attention to the color balance.

Oishi has also become particularly well-known for his use of on-screen text, a style that Oishi overall contributed to the house "Shaft style" originating in the Pani Poni Dash openings. In the midst of episodes themselves, however, the initial appearance of on-screen text as it appears in Shaft series aside from episodes or series directed by Oishi comes from Hidamari Sketch episode 2, in which he used Kanji to punctuate or emphasize lines of dialogue for comedic purposes, for puns, and so forth. Later, Shinbo asked Oishi to be the series director for Bakemonogatari with the intent of visualizing words themselves, which Oishi had proven himself to be good at doing. However, as Oishi experimented more with on-screen text, and its usage was incorporated by the other Shaft directors, so too did its incorporation by Oishi himself.

Discussing the differences between Oishi and Itamura as the series directors of Monogatari, sound director Youta Tsuruoka opined that Oishi was an "intuitive" director in contrast to Itamura's "logical" approach.

== Works ==
=== Television series ===
In "Director(s)" column highlights Oishi's directorial works.

Year	Title	Director(s)	Studio	SB (Note: Storyboard artist.)	ED (Note: Episode director, equivalent to unit director.)	KA (Note: Key animator.)	Other roles and notes	Ref(s)
1993	Mobile Suit Victory Gundam	Yoshiyuki Tomino (chief)	Sunrise	No	No	Yes		
1994	Yu Yu Hakusho	Noriyuki Abe	Pierrot	No	No	Yes		
1994	Mobile Fighter G Gundam	Yoshiyuki Tomino (chief)	Sunrise	No	No	Yes		
1995	Juuni Senshi Bakuretsu Eto Ranger	Kunitoshi Okajima (chief)	Shaft	No	No	Yes		
1998	Battle Athletes Victory	Katsuhito Akiyama	AIC	No	No	Yes		
1999	Space Pirate Mito	Takashi Watanabe	Triangle Staff	No	No	Yes		
1999	A Pair of Queens	Takashi Watanabe	Triangle Staff	No	No	Yes		
1999	Power Stone	Takahiro Omori	Pierrot	No	No	Yes		
1999	Dai-Guard	Seiji Mizushima	Xebec	No	No	Yes		
2000	Android Kikaider: The Animation	Tensai Okamura	Radix	No	No	Yes		
2001	Cyborg 009: The Cyborg Soldier	Jun Kawagoe	Japan Vistec	Yes	Yes	Yes		
2003	PoPoLoCrois	Kazuhiro Ochi	TMS Entertainment	No	No	Yes		
2004	Tetsujin 28-go	Yasuhiro Imagawa	Palm Studio	Yes	Yes	Yes		
2004	Maburaho	Shinichiro Kimura	J.C.Staff	No	No	Yes		
2004	Shura no Toki – Age of Chaos	Shin Misawa	Studio Comet	No	No	Yes		
2004	Tsukuyomi: Moon Phase	Akiyuki Shinbo (chief)	Shaft	Yes	Yes	Yes	Design assistance	
2005	Pani Poni Dash!	Akiyuki Shinbo; Shin Oonuma (series)	Shaft	Yes	Yes	Yes	Concept design assistance Opening director	
2006	Negima!?	Akiyuki Shinbo; Shin Oonuma (chief)	Shaft	Yes	Yes	Yes		
2007	Hidamari Sketch	Akiyuki Shinbo (chief); Ryouki Kamitsubo (chief)	Shaft	Yes	Yes	Yes	Art design assistance	
2007	Sayonara, Zetsubou-Sensei	Akiyuki Shinbo	Shaft	Yes	No	Yes	Telop work Opening director	
2008	Hidamari Sketch x 365	Akiyuki Shinbo	Shaft	Yes	Yes	Yes	Production director	
2009	Maria Holic	Akiyuki Shinbo; Yukihiro Miyamoto (series)	Shaft	No	No	No	Telop work Opening director and storyboard	
2009	Bakemonogatari	Akiyuki Shinbo; Tatsuya Oishi (series)	Shaft	Yes	Yes	Yes	Opening director Assistant ending director	
2010	And Yet the Town Moves	Akiyuki Shinbo	Shaft	No	No	No	Subtitle designer	
2023	Undead Unluck	Yuki Yase	David Production	No	No	Yes		

=== OVAs ===
Year	Title	Director(s)	Studio	SB	ED	KA	Other roles and notes	Ref(s)
1991	Ninja Gaiden	Mamoru Kanbe	Studio Junio	No	No	No	In-between animator	
1997	Legend of Crystania: The Chaos Ring	Ryutaro Nakamura	Triangle Staff	No	No	Yes		
1999	Tenamonya Voyagers	Akiyuki Shinbo	Pierrot	No	No	Yes		
2001	Read or Die	Koji Masunari	Studio Deen	No	No	Yes		
2006	Tsukuyomi: Moon Phase	Akiyuki Shinbo (chief)	Shaft	No	No	Yes		
2006	Negima!? Magister Negi Magi: Spring	Akiyuki Shinbo (chief); Shin Oonuma	Shaft	No	No	Yes		
2008	Mahō Sensei Negima!: Shiroki Tsubasa Ala Alba	Akiyuki Shinbo (chief); Various	Shaft	No	No	No	Opening director	

=== Films ===
Year	Title	Director(s)	Studio	SB	ED	KA	Other roles and notes	Ref(s)
1995	Memories: Magnetic Rose	Katsuhiro Otomo (chief); Kōji Morimoto	Studio 4°C	No	No	No	In-between animator	
2000	Digimon Adventure: Our War Game!	Mamoru Hosoda	Toei Animation	No	No	Yes		
2000	Digimon: The Movie	Mamoru Hosoda; Shigeyasu Yamauchi	Toei Animation	No	No	Yes		
2016	Kizumonogatari I: Tekketsu	Akiyuki Shinbo (chief); Tatsuya Oishi	Shaft	Yes	Yes	No		
2016	Kizumonogatari II: Nekketsu	Akiyuki Shinbo (chief); Tatsuya Oishi	Shaft	Yes	No	No		
2017	Kizumonogatari III: Reiketsu	Akiyuki Shinbo (chief); Tatsuya Oishi	Shaft	Yes	No	No		
2024	Kizumonogatari: Koyomi Vamp	Tatsuya Oishi	Shaft	No	No	No	Screenplay	

=== Other ===
Highlights roles with series directorial duties.

Year	Title	Director(s) (Note: Directors credited for all works as Director (監督, Kantoku) unless noted otherwise.)	Studio	Roles	Ref(s)
2010	MAG Net	Tatsuya Oishi	Shaft	Television series opening director	
2018	Crystar	Tatsuya Oishi	Shaft	Video game opening cinematic director	
2026	SHAFT 50th Anniversary Exhibition	—N/a	—N/a	Exhibit planning assistance	

== Awards and nominations ==
Year	Award	Category	Work	Result	Ref(s)
2016	Newtype	Best Picture (film)	Kizumonogatari I: Nekketsu	Runner-up	
2017	Tokyo Anime Award Festival	Best Anime of 2009	Bakemonogatari	Won	
2018	Crunchyroll Anime Awards	Best Film	Kizumonogatari III: Reiketsu	Nominated	

== Notes ==
=== Works cited ===
- Maeda, Hisashi; Hiraiwa, Shinsuke (2007). アニメ新表現宣言！新房監督作品の奥にアニメ表現の最先端を見た！ [Declaration of a New Expression for Anime! I saw the Cutting Edge of Anime Expression in Director Shinbo's Work!] (in Japanese). Tamon Creative.
- Kizawa, Yukito; Nakamoto, Muneo; Yanagi, Yuuichi, eds. (2008). Hidamari Sketch Album. Houbunsha. ISBN 978-4832277403.
- Misaka, Taiji, ed. (2009). まりあ†ほりっく アニメ公式ガイドブック [Maria Holic Anime Official Guidebook]. Media Factory. ISBN 978-4840129312.
- Nishibe, Maho; Shibayama, Yoshimasa, eds. (2012). Hidamari Sketch x Honeycomb Production Note. Shaft.
- Kizawa, Yukito, ed. (2013). ひだまりスケッチデイズ -TVアニメ公式ガイドブック- [Hidamari Sketch Days: TV Anime Official Guidebook]. Houbunsha. ISBN 978-4832277403.
- Rubin, Lucy Paige (2017). Between Comedy and Despair: The House Style of Studio Shaft (Bachelor of the Arts). Wesleyan University.
- Aniplex (2017). Kizumonogatari Part 3: Reiketsu Deluxe Booklet. Aniplex of America.
- Kushida, Makoto, ed. (2017). 〈物語〉Febri ["Monogatari" Febri] (in Japanese). Ichijinsha. ASIN B075QWP3NZ.
- Takahashi, Yumi, ed. (2019). Akiyuki Shimbo x Shaft Chronicle (in Japanese). Dotcom. ISBN 978-4835457017.
