= List of Nisekoi chapters =

Nisekoi (ニセコイ; lit. 'False Love'), released in English as Nisekoi: False Love, is a Japanese romantic comedy manga series written and illustrated by Naoshi Komi. It was first published as a one-shot manga in Shueisha's seasonal Jump NEXT! magazine, before being serialized in Weekly Shōnen Jump. In December 2011, Shueisha published the first chapter in English online. Viz has since published all the volumes.

A new bunkobon re-print of the series containing new cover volumes, up to 16 volumes; 14 of which cover the main series and the remaining two covering the novel adaptations, and containing an epilogue set ten years after the main series' ending was announced on June 7, 2023. The first two volumes will be released on June 16, 2023, with subsequent volumes being released on the 18th of every month after.

== Volume list ==
=== Tankōbon ===
No.	Title	Original release date	North American release date
1	Nisekoi: False Love, Vol. 1: The Promise; Yakusoku (ヤクソク)	May 2, 2012; 978-4-08-870454-8	January 7, 2014; 978-1-4215-5799-1
1. "The Promise" (ヤクソク, "Yakusoku"); 2. "Questions" (シツモン, "Shitsumon"); 3. "The First Time" (ハジメテ, "Hajimete"); 4. "The Encounter" (ソウグウ, "Sōgū"); 5. "Lots" (イッパイ, "Ippai"); 6. "Birds of a Feather" (ニタモノ, "Nitamono"); 7. "Homemade" (テヅクリ, "Tedzukuri")
2	Nisekoi: False Love, Vol. 2: Zawsze in Love; Zakusha In Rabu (ザクシャ イン ラブ)	July 4, 2012; 978-4-08-870470-8	March 4, 2014; 978-1-4215-6004-5
8. "The Visit" (ホウモン, "Houmon"); 9. "Up Close" (セッキン, "Sekkin"); 10. "Swimming" (スイエイ, "Suiei"); 11. "The Keyhole" (カギアナ, "Kagiana"); 12. "Out of the Bag" (ネタバレ, "Netabare"); 13. "Zawsze in Love" (ザクシャ イン ラブ, "Zakusha In Rabu"); 14. "We're Even" (カシカリ, "Kashikari"); 15. "Rival" (ライバル, "Raibaru"); 16. "Showdown" (ケットウ, "Kettou")
3	Nisekoi: False Love, Vol. 3: What's in a Name? Yobikata (ヨビカタ)	August 3, 2012; 978-4-08-870503-3	May 6, 2014; 978-1-4215-6449-4
17. "Cute" (カワイイ, "Kawaī"); 18. "Happiness" (シアワセ, "Shiawase"); 19. "Visiting the Sick" (オミマイ, "Omimai"); 20. "Dense" (ドンカン, "Donkan"); 21. "Scar" (キズアト, "Kizuato"); 22. "Hot Spring" (オンセン, "Onsen"); 23. "Women's Bath" (オンナユ, "Onnayu"); 24. "Luck of the Draw" (クジビキ, "Kujibiki"); 25. "What's in a Name?" (ヨビカタ, "Yobikata")
4	Nisekoi: False Love, Vol. 4: Making Sure; Kakunin (カクニン)	November 2, 2012; 978-4-08-870538-5	July 1, 2014; 978-1-4215-6584-2
26. "Love Letter" (コイブミ, "Koibumi"); 27. "Detour" (ヨリミチ, "Yorimichi"); 28. "Celebration" (オイワイ, "Oiwai"); 29. "Making Sure" (カクニン, "Kakunin"); 30. "Photo" (シャシン, "Shashin"); 31. "After School" (ホウカゴ, "Houkago"); 32. "Umbrella Buddies (アイアイ, "Aiai"); 33. "Showdown" (シュラバ, "Shuraba"); 34. "Pursuit" (ツイセキ, "Tsuiseki")
5	Nisekoi: False Love, Vol. 5: Typhoon; Taifuu (タイフウ)	January 4, 2013; 978-4-08-870602-3	September 2, 2014; 978-1-4215-6585-9
35. "Explosion" (バクハツ, "Bakuhatsu"); 36. "Three Keys" (サンボン, "Sanbon"); 37. "Greeting" (アイサツ, "Aisatsu"); 38. "Work" (ハタラク, "Hataraku"); 39. "Typhoon" (タイフウ, "Taifuu"); 40. "Liar" (ウソツキ, "Usotsuki"); 41. "Stray Dog" (ステイヌ, "Suteinu"); 42. "Festival" (エンニチ, "Ennichi"); 43. "Blessings" (ゴリヤク, "Goriyaku"); 44. "At the Beach" (ウミベデ, "Umibede")
6	Nisekoi: False Love, Vol. 6: Showtime; Honban (ホンバン)	March 4, 2013; 978-4-08-870630-6	November 4, 2014; 978-1-42-156586-6
45. "Turmoil" (モヤモヤ, "Moyamoya"); 46. "The Play" (エンゲキ, "Engeki"); 47. "Costume" (イショウ, "Ishou"); 48. "The Show" (カイエン, "Kaien"); 49. "Showtime" (ホンバン, "Honban"); 50. "The Stars" (シュヤク, "Shuyaku"); 51. "From Now On" (コレカラ, "Korekara"); 52. "Measurements" (ソクテイ, "Sokutei"); 53. "Horoscope" (ウラナイ, "Uranai")
Chitoge ponders how she feels about Raku, only to get nervous when Kosaki suggests that such emotions about a guy (not knowing whom specifically) could be feelings of love. But when Chitoge asks Raku whether they would make a good couple if their relationship was not a fake one, Raku's response upsets Chitoge to the point where she ignores him. Shu recruits Raku and Chitoge to star in their class play of Romeo and Juliet, but when Chitoge declines, Kosaki volunteers. However, on the day of the play, she twists her ankle, which leads Raku to ask Chitoge to play Juliet. As Raku navigates through the play's obstacles set up by their friends, Chitoge realizes she has fallen in love with him. Raku takes Kosaki to the roof so they can act out a love confession scene from the play. Raku tells Chitoge, Kosaki, and Marika that he got his pendant back but it is still broken. In the episodic stories, Raku is asked to find out Chitoge's measurements to unlock a briefcase, and Kosaki experiences an unlucky day according to her horoscope.
7	Nisekoi: False Love, Vol. 7: The Reason; Kikkake (キッカケ)	June 4, 2013; 978-4-08-870665-8	January 5, 2015; 978-1-42-157379-3
54. "Fate" (インネン, "Innen"); 55. "Match" (ショウブ, "Shoubu"); 56. "Teach Me" (オシエテ, "Oshiete"); 57. "Notice" (キヅイテ, "Kidzuite"); 58. "Loss" (フンシツ, "Funjitsu"); 59. "It's Been a While" (ヒサビサ, "Hisabisa"); 60. "Necessity" (ヒツヨウ, "Hitsuyou"); 61. "Mother" (ハハオヤ, "Hahaoya"); 62. "Reason" (キッカケ, "Kikkake")
8	Nisekoi: False Love, Vol. 8: Last Minute; Girigiri (ギリギリ)	September 4, 2013; 978-4-08-870805-8	March 3, 2015; 978-1-42-157380-9
63. "After That" (ソノアト, "Sonoato"); 64. "Shrine Maiden" (ミコサン, "Mikosan"); 65. "Change" (ヘンボウ, "Henbou"); 66. "Changing Seats" (セキガエ, "Sekigae"); 67. "Delicious" (オイシイ, "Oishii"); 68. "That Is" (ソレッテ, "Sorette"); 69. "Almost" (ギリギリ, "Girigiri"); 70. "Handcuffs" (テジョウ, "Tejou"); 71. "Work" (オシゴト, "Oshigoto")
9	Nisekoi: False Love, Vol. 9: Kamikaze; Kamikaze (カミカゼ)	November 1, 2013; 978-4-08-870838-6 (reg. ed.); ISBN 978-4-08-908201-0 (ltd. ed. w/ CD)	May 5, 2015; 978-1-42-157689-3
72. "Marathon" (マラソン, "Marason"); 73. "Indirect" (カンセツ, "Kansetsu"); 74. "A Huge Lie" (オオウソ, "Oouso"); 75. "Kamikaze" (カミカゼ, "Kamikaze"); 76. "Little Sister" (イモウト, "Imouto"); 77. "Work!" (ハタラケ, "Hatarake"); 78. "Give That Back" (カエシテ, "Kaeshite"); 79. "Peace" (ヤスラギ, "Yasuragi"); 80. "Suspension Bridge" (ツリバシ, "Tsuribashi")
10	Nisekoi: False Love, Vol. 10: Shu's Crush; Sukinako (スキナコ)	January 4, 2014; 978-4-08-870890-4	July 7, 2015; 978-1-42-157690-9
81. "Bath House" (セントウ, "Sentou"); 82. "Cleaning" (オソウジ, "Osouji"); 83. "Crush" (スキナコ, "Sukinako"); 84. "Friend" (トモダチ, "Tomodachi"); 85. "Support" (オウエン, "Ouen"); 86. "Sick Visit" (オミマウ, "Omimau"); 87. "What Day" (ナンノヒ, "Nanohi"); 88. "Loss" (ソウシツ, "Soushitsu"); 89. "Reenactment" (サイゲン, "Saigen")
11	Nisekoi: False Love, Vol. 11: Bouquet; Hanataba (ハナタバ)	March 4, 2014; 978-4-08-880026-4	September 1, 2015; 978-1-42-157781-4
90. "Blue" (アオイロ, "Aoiro"); 91. "Frustration" (クヤシイ, "Kuyashi"); 92. "Bouquet" (ハナタバ, "Hanataba"); 93. "I Want To Lose Weight" (ヤセタイ, "Yasetai"); 94. "Costume" (キグルミ, "Kigurumi"); 95. "Old Man" (オッサン, "Ossan"); 96. "Imagination" (ソウゾウ, "Souzou"); 97. "Please" (オネガイ, "Onegai"); 98. "Good Morning" (オハヨウ, "Ohayou")
12	Nisekoi: False Love, Vol. 12: Festival; Omatsuri (オマツリ)	May 2, 2014; 978-4-08-880058-5	November 3, 2015; 978-1421579764
99. "Feeble" (カヨワイ, "Kayowai"); 100. "Try" (オワメシ, "Owameshi"); 101. "Cakery" (ケーキヤ, "Kekiya"); 102. "Cheer" (セイエン, "Seien"); 103. "Overcome" (コクフク, "Kokufuku"); 104. "Raku-sama" (ラクサマ, "Raku-sama"); 105. "Tanabata" (タナバタ, "Tanabata"); 106. "Investigation" (ソウサク, "Sousaku"); 107. "Festival" (オマツリ, "Omatsuri")
13	Nisekoi: False Love, Vol. 13: Don't Worry; Anshin (アンシン)	August 4, 2014; 978-4-08-880152-0	January 5, 2016; 978-1421579771
108. "Question" (シツモン, "Shitsumon"); 109. "Awkward" (ブキヨウ, "Bukiyō"); 110. "Outing" (オデカケ, "Odekake"); 111. "Charming" (ホレボレ, "Horebore"); 112. "Step" (ステップ, "Suteppu"); 113. "Great Grandfather" (ジイサマ, "Jisama"); 114. "One Millimeter" (イチミリ, "Ichimiri"); 115. "Relief" (アンシン, "Anshin"); 116. "Box Lunch" (ベントウ, "Bentou")
14	Nisekoi: False Love, Vol. 14; Nēsan (ネエサン)	October 3, 2014; 978-4-08-880192-6	April 5, 2016; 978-1421581248
117. "Stomach Pain" (フクツウ, "Fukutsuu"); 118. "Nee-san" (ネエサン, "Nēsan"); 119. "Teacher" (センセイ, "Sensei"); 120. "Need To Know" (シリタイ, "Shiritai"); 121. "Younger Brother" (オトウト, "Otōto"); 122. "Interview" (メンダン, "Mendan"); 123. "Suitable" (ムイテル, "Muiteru"); 124. "Lady" (レディー, "Redī"); 125. "Girls..." (オンナハ, "On'naha")
15	Nisekoi: False Love, Vol. 15; Misukon (ミスコン)	December 4, 2014; 978-4-08-880222-0	May 3, 2016; 978-1421583198
126. "Declaration" (センゲン, "Sengen"); 127. "King" (オウサマ, "Ousama"); 128. "Connect" (ツナイデ, "Tsunaide"); 129. "Cold" (ツメタイ, "Tsumetai"); 130. "Interview" (シュザイ, "Shuzai"); 131. "Plan" (サクセン, "Sakusen"); 132. "Beauty Pageant" (ミスコン, "Misukon"); 133. "One on One" (タイマン, "Taiman"); 134. "Choice" (ゴシメイ, "Goshimei")
16	Nisekoi: False Love, Vol. 16; Sokkuri (ソックリ)	February 4, 2015; 978-4-08-880303-6	July 5, 2016; 978-1421583204
135. "Singing Voice" (ウタゴエ, "Utagoe"); 136. "Identical" (ソックリ, "Sokkuri"); 137. "I'm Glad" (ヨカッタ, "Yokatta"); 138. "Great Luck" (ダイキチ, "Daikichi"); 139. "Speech" (スピーチ, "Supīchi"); 140. "Slumber" (スイミン, "Suimin"); 141. "Sincere" (セイジツ, "Seijitsu"); 142. "Animal" (ドウブツ, "Dobutsu"); 143. "Work" (ハタラコ, "Hatarako")
17	Nisekoi: False Love, Vol. 17; Ojou (オジョウ)	April 3, 2015; 978-4-08-880330-2	September 6, 2016; 978-1421585123
144. "Staying The Night" (オトマリ, "Otomari"); 145. "Athletics" (タイイク, "Taiiku"); 146. "Perfect" (カンペキ, "Kanpeki"); 147. "Yui-Nee" (ユイネエ, "Yui-Nee"); 148. "Successor" (アトツギ, "Atotsugi"); 149. "Ojou" (オジョウ, "Ojou"); 150. "Deciding Groups" (ハンギメ, "Hangime"); 151. "Trouble" (トラブル, "Toraburu"); 152. "Sound Asleep" (グッスリ, "Gussuri")
18	Nisekoi: False Love, Vol. 18; Ichigeki (イチゲキ)	June 4, 2015; 978-4-08-880366-1	November 1, 2016; 978-1421585130
153. "Action Movie" (カツゲキ, "Katsugeki"); 154. "Happy" (ウレシイ, "Ureshī"); 155. "A Certain Thing" (アルコト, "Arukoto"); 156. "One Shot" (イチゲキ, "Ichigeki"); 157. "Transfer" (テンコウ, "Tenkou"); 158. "Question" (シツモン, "Shitsumon"); 159. "Good Idea" (メイアン, "Meian"); 160. "I Want to See Him" (アイタイ, "Aitai"); 161. "Trap" (トラップ, "Torappu")
19	Nisekoi: False Love, Vol. 19; Sentaku (センタク)	August 4, 2015; 978-4-08-880446-0	January 3, 2017; 978-1421587035
162. "I Understand" (ワカッタ, "Wakatta"); 163. "Scrap" (キレハシ, "Kirehashi"); 164. "Magical" (マホウノ, "Mahouno"); 165. "Fir Tree" (モミノキ, "Mominoki"); 166. "Looking Forward to it" (タノシミ, "Tanoshimi"); 167. "Choice" (センタク, "Sentaku"); 168. "Understood" (ツウジタ, "Tsuujita"); 169. "Vacation" (バカンス, "Bakansu"); 170. "Survive" (サバイブ, "Sabaibu")
20	Nisekoi: False Love, Vol. 20; Meirei (メイレイ)	November 4, 2015; 978-4-08-880483-5	March 7, 2017; 978-1421590196
171. "True Feelings" (ココロネ, "Kokorone"); 172. "Shrine Visit" (サンパイ, "Sanpai"); 173. "Something's Changed" (へンヨウ, "Henyou"); 174. "I Have Someone" (イルワヨ, "Iruwayo"); 175. "Agitated" (ドウヨウ, "Douyou"); 176. "Child" (オコサマ, "Okosama"); 177. "Now That I Think About It" (オモエバ, "Omoeba"); 178. "To Become An Adult" (オトナニ, "Otonani"); 179. "An Order" (メイレイ, "Meirei")
21	Nisekoi: False Love, Vol. 21; Marī e (マリーヘ)	January 4, 2016; 978-4-08-880580-1	May 2, 2017; 978-1421590202
180. "I've Been Watching" (ミテキタ, "Mitekita"); 181. "Limit" (ゲンカイ, "Genkai"); 182. "Contract" (ケイヤク, "Keiyaku"); 183. "Message" (デンゴン, "Dengon"); 184. "Role" (オヤクメ, "Oyakume"); 185. "Battle" (タタカイ, "Tatakai"); 186. "Why" (ドウシテ, "Doushite"); 187. "Dungeon" (ロウゴク, "Rougoku"); 188. "To Mari" (マリーヘ, "Marī e")
22	Nisekoi: False Love, Vol. 22; Mannaka (マンナカ)	April 4, 2016; 978-4-08-880650-1	July 4, 2017; 978-1421593425
189. "Marriage" (ケッコン, "Kekkon"); 190. "Take Me Away" (サラッテ, "Saratte"); 191. "Sorry to Make You Wait" (オマタセ, "Omatase"); 192. "Personal Interest" (シジョウ, "Sijou"); 193. "Take Flight" (トビタツ, "Tobitatsu"); 194. "Not One Bit" (ヒトツモ, "Hitotsumo"); 195. "Center" (マンナカ, "Mannaka"); 196. "Be Brave" (ガンバル, "Ganbaru"); 197. "Cheer Up" (ゲンキニ, "Genkini")
23	Nisekoi: False Love, Vol. 23; Itsukaha (イツカハ)	June 3, 2016; 978-4-08-880717-1	September 5, 2017; 978-1421593432
198. "Coincidence" (グウゼン, "Guuzen"); 199. "True Love" (マジコイ, "Majikoi"); 200. "Realized" (キヅイタ, "Kidzuita"); 201. "Spring Breeze" (ハルカゼ, "Harukaze"); 202. "Serious" (シンケン, "Sinken"); 203. "Beginning" (ハジマリ, "Hajimari"); 204. "Chance" (チャンス, "Chansu"); 205. "That's What You Would Call It" (ソウヨブ, "Souyobu"); 206. "One Day" (イツカハ, "Itsukaha"); 207. "University" (ダイガク, "Daigaku")
24	Nisekoi: False Love, Vol. 24; Hoshihuruyoruni (ホシフルヨルニ)	August 4, 2016; 978-4-08-880749-2	November 7, 2017; 978-1421594385
208. "Someone I Look Up To" (アコガレ, "Akogare"); 209. "Problematic" (ヤッカイ, "Yakkai"); 210. "I've Decided" (キメタノ, "Kimetano"); 211. "On The Night of Falling Stars" (ホシフルヨルニ, "Hoshihuruyoruni"); 212. "Bye-Bye" (バイバイ, "Bye-Bye"); 213. "Continuation" (ツヅキガ, "Tsudzukiga"); 214. "Whereabouts" (イドコロ, "Idokoro"); 215. "I Like You" (スキナノ, "Sukinano"); 216. "The Truth" (シンソウ, "Sinsou"); 217. "Decided" (キマッタ, "Kimatta")
25	Nisekoi: False Love, Vol. 25; Nisekoi (ニセコイ)	October 4, 2016; 978-4-08-880805-5	January 2, 2018; 978-1421595153
218. "Something" (ナンダカ, "Nandaka"); 219. "As I Thought" (ヤッパリ, "Yappari"); 220. "The Last" (サイゴノ, "Saigono"); 221. "The Truth" (シンジツ, "Shinjitsu"); 222. "Fake" (ニセモノ, "Nisemono"); 223. "Surprise" (イヒョウ, "Ihyou"); 224. "Can't Do It" (デキナイ, "Dekinai"); 225. "Confession" (コクハク, "Kokuhaku"); 226. "Breakup" (ケツベツ, "Ketsubetsu"); 227. "Nisekoi" (ニセコイ, "Nisekoi"); 228. "Journey" (タビダチ, "Tabidachi"); 229. "Promise" (ヤクソク, "Yakusoku")

=== Bunkobon ===
No.	Japanese release date	Japanese ISBN
1	June 16, 2023	978-4-08-619798-4
2	June 16, 2023	978-4-08-619799-1
3	July 18, 2023	978-4-08-619800-4
4	July 18, 2023	978-4-08-619801-1
5	August 18, 2023	978-4-08-619802-8
6	August 18, 2023	978-4-08-619803-5
7	September 15, 2023	978-4-08-619804-2
8	September 15, 2023	978-4-08-619805-9
9	October 18, 2023	978-4-08-619806-6
10	October 18, 2023	978-4-08-619807-3
11	November 17, 2023	978-4-08-619808-0
12	November 17, 2023	978-4-08-619809-7
13	December 18, 2023	978-4-08-619810-3
14	December 18, 2023	978-4-08-619811-0
