= List of Nisekoi episodes =

Cover of the first DVD volume of Nisekoi released by Aniplex, featuring Chitoge Kirisaki

Nisekoi is an anime adaptation of the manga of the same title written and illustrated by Naoshi Komi. It aired weekly between January 11, 2014, and May 24, 2014, on MBS and a number of Japanese nationwide channels such as Tokyo MX, tvk, TV Aichi and some others, while outside Japan, it is streamed by Crunchyroll and Daisuki with subtitles in English and other languages. It ran for 20 episodes. A second season aired between April 10 and June 26, 2015.

The romantic comedy follows the misadventures of Raku Ichijo, a high school student who is the son of a yakuza leader, as he is forcibly paired with Chitoge Kirisaki, a transfer student with a conflicting personality who is the daughter of a rival gang leader, in a pretend dating relationship to quell the feud between the gangs. As Raku pines for the affections of his crush Kosaki Onodera, he learns that the girls have been carrying keys that could unlock his locket, a symbol of his past love.

The first season was animated by Shaft and directed by Naoyuki Tatsuwa, with Akiyuki Shinbo serving as chief director and series composition writer. Shaft, under the pseudonym Fuyashi Tou, co-composed the series with Shinbo. Naoki "naotyu-" Chiba and Kakeru Ishihama composed the music for the first six episodes, and Tomoki Kikuya composed the music for episodes 7 through 20. Nobuhiro Sugiyama (Shaft) designed the characters and served as chief animation director alongside Kazuya Shiotsuki (Shaft). Starting at episode 9 and continuing through the rest of the season, Shinya Nishizawa joined Sugiyama and Shiotsuki as a chief animation director. Six episodes were outsourced outside of Shaft: episodes 3, 10, and 16 to Mouse; episode 6 to Shenron Frame; episode 8 to Studio Fantasia; and episode 12 to Digital Network Animation. (Note: Outsourcing studios credited as Assisting Production (協力プロダクション) on their respective episodes.) A 3-episode OVA series featuring most of the same staff was produced in October 2014 with most of the same staff with the exception of the chief animation directors: all of the episodes have Nishizawa and Sugiyama; however, Shiotsuki was only involved with episode 1, and episode 3 adds Akihisa Takano (Shaft).

The second season features Shaft, Shinbo, and Kikuya returning to their respective roles; however, Tatsuwa did not return to direct the series, which ultimately fell in the hands of Yukihiro Miyamoto, who took on the role of chief episode director. Sugiyama returned as character designer and chief animation director, as did Takano from the OVA series, but Nishizawa was replaced by Masaaki Sakurai. Five episodes were outsourced outside of Shaft: episodes 3 and 10 to Mouse; episode 5 to A.P.P.P.; episode 9 to Jumondou; and episode 11 to B.S.P. (Note: Outsourcing studios credited as Production Assistance (制作協力) on their respective episodes.) A second two-episode OVA series premiered after the second season with the same staff.

== Episode list ==
=== Nisekoi Season 1 ===
No.	Title	End card	Directed by	Written by	Original air date
1	"The Promise"; Transliteration: "Yakusoku" (Japanese: ヤクソク)	Hirokazu Koyama	Takashi Kawabata	Muneo Nakamoto	January 11, 2014
Raku Ichijo, the son of a yakuza boss, prefers to just live a normal high school life. On the way to school he is kneed in the face by a girl, but gets tended by Kosaki Onodera, a sweet classmate that he has had a crush on since middle school. The teacher announces a new transfer student, Chitoge Kirisaki, who happens to be the girl that crashed into Raku, and they start arguing. Raku realizes he has lost his locket that contains the memories of his first love, because of the collision, and asks Chitoge to help look for it. After several days their relationship gets worse, then Raku tells Chitoge to stop looking. Chitoge eventually finds the locket. Afterwards, Raku's father tells Raku that he is to pretend being in a dating relationship with a girl from a rival gang in order for their gangs to make peace, but to Raku's chagrin, the girl turns out to be Chitoge.
2	"Encounter"; Transliteration: "Sōgū" (Japanese: ソウグウ)	Hajime Ueda	Naoyuki Tatsuwa	Muneo Nakamoto	January 18, 2014
In order to settle the feud between their families' gangs, Raku and Chitoge act lovey-dovey towards each other. The next day, Chitoge and Raku go on a date, which is heavily supervised by the gangs, but they drive each other nuts on typical activities. At a park, Chitoge heads to a restroom where she overhears her gang acting suspicious over the relationship. Raku wishes he were on a date with Kosaki instead when she suddenly appears. Chitoge returns and tells Kosaki that she and Raku are a couple.
3	"Two of a Kind"; Transliteration: "Nitamono" (Japanese: ニタモノ)	Yuji Himukai	Sumito Sasaki	Yukito Kizawa	January 25, 2014
Raku and Chitoge's classmates get word that they are a couple, but before they can deny it, they spot Claude watching from the tree, so they act lovey-dovey. Kosaki tells Raku about his good qualities and how he cares about people, but accidentally drops her key. When Raku learns that Chitoge has not made any other friends, he helps her out. They talk about their fake dating situation, unaware that Kosaki has overheard them.
4	"The Visit"; Transliteration: "Hōmon" (Japanese: ホウモン)	Hekiru Hikawa	Tarō Kubo	Muneo Nakamoto	February 1, 2014
Raku's friends come over to his house for a study session. Ruri tries to set up a situation where Raku tutors Kosaki, but Chitoge volunteers. Shu asks if they have kissed yet, so Raku pulls him aside and reveals his situation with Chitoge. Raku's gangster guys trick Raku and Chitoge into being locked in a storage room, where Raku learns that Chitoge is afraid of dark places. They also discover they have never kissed anyone on the lips before.
5	"Swimming"; Transliteration: "Suiei" (Japanese: スイエイ)	Kantoku	Kōsuke Hirota	Yukito Kizawa	February 8, 2014
Ruri tries to improve Kosaki's chances with Raku by having Raku and Chitoge teach Kosaki how to swim. Ruri notices that Raku and Chitoge argue more often than act lovey-dovey. Raku finds Kosaki's key and tries to use it unlock his pendant but it turns out to be the key to the girls locker room. The day of the swim meet, Kosaki uses a kick board, but when Chitoge gets hit by leg cramps and almost drowns, Raku rescues her and then has to give her mouth-to-mouth which infuriates Chitoge. Following the credits is a showcase of Raku and the gang's previous Valentine's Day experiences.
6	"Borrowing and Lending"; Transliteration: "Kashikari" (Japanese: カシカリ)	Mako Aboshi	Kazuteru Ōhashi	Miku Ōshima	February 15, 2014
Chitoge finds out that Raku was the one who saved her from drowning in the school pool. She tries to thank him, but ends up beating him up more in the process. Kosaki attempts to confess her feelings to Raku but ultimately fails. Chitoge later finds Raku's locket and returns it to him. It is later revealed that Chitoge had the locket chain fixed in secret, and that she also made a promise with a boy ten years ago, yet all she can remember about the boy is the line "Zawsze in Love" ("ザクシャ イン ラブ").
7	"Rival"; Transliteration: "Raibaru" (Japanese: ライバル)	Robico	Yukihiro Miyamoto	Muneo Nakamoto	February 22, 2014
Seishirou Tsugumi is introduced as another new transfer student. As a former acquaintance of Chitoge, Seishirou finds Raku unfit to be Chitoge's lover. Seishirou challenges Raku to a duel but is inadvertently outplayed. While trying to revive his opponent, Raku learns that Seishirou is actually a girl despite her masculinity. The day ends with Raku earning a genuine amount of respect and affection from Seishirou.
8	"Happiness"; Transliteration: "Shiawase" (Japanese: シアワセ)	MagoMago	Eiichi Kuboyama	Yukito Kizawa	March 1, 2014
When Raku has to buy pet food, Tsugumi accompanies him to see if he is really fit to be Chitoge's boyfriend. However, Tsugumi is bothered by her developing feelings for Raku, so she later seeks advice from her classmates. After being reminded that Chitoge had a first love, Chitoge opens her closet and reads her old diary from ten years ago. When the entries cease, she discovers a key resembling one that could open Raku's locket.
9	"Hot Springs"; Transliteration: "Onsen" (Japanese: オンセン)	Namori	Shūji Miyahara	Miku Ōshima	March 8, 2014
Raku's class has a trip to a hot springs resort. Shu arranges for Raku, Chitoge, Kosaki and Seishirou to ride together and bump into each other on the way. Chitoge recalls the boy from her diary has a scar on his forehead, but is shocked when she sees Raku with a forehead scar. After settling in, the group plans to take a dip at the hot springs. Claude switches the signs for the men's and women's bath to trap Raku into the wrong hot springs. In the bath, Chitoge finds Raku but the two cooperate to get Raku to an escape route, however, the other girls arrive, and Kosaki's talk about first love has Raku curious. Raku eventually escapes and apologizes to Chitoge.
10	"Lottery"; Transliteration: "Kujibiki" (Japanese: クジビキ)	Akihiko Yoshida	Sumito Sasaki	Muneo Nakamoto	March 15, 2014
Continuing on the resort trip, the class holds a test of courage where the boys are paired with girls. Raku and Kosaki are luckily paired with each other. Meanwhile, Chitoge who had mixed feelings after the bath incident, was prompted to become one of its ghosts for the test despite her fear of the dark. After hearing of Chitoge's situation, Raku leaves Kosaki to rescue Chitoge. While recollecting on the time she was saved by a boy as a kid, Raku appears before Chitoge. Afterwards, Chitoge tells Raku to call each other by their first name.
11	"Celebration"; Transliteration: "Oiwai" (Japanese: オイワイ)	Amakura Surume	Kōsuke Hirota	Yukito Kizawa	March 22, 2014
When Tsugumi plans a surprise birthday party for Chitoge, and invites Raku and his friends, Ruri makes Kosaki go with Raku to shop for gifts together. Raku finds his time with Kosaki to be fleeting, but Kosaki shows Raku a scenic overlook. When Raku asks Kosaki if she is the promised girl from ten years ago, she answers yes, but they are interrupted by a phone call. At the party, after receiving her friends and family's gifts, Chitoge asks Raku about his feelings for the promised girl and whether he recognizes the phrase "Forever in Love".
12	"Confirmation"; Transliteration: "Kakunin" (Japanese: カクニン)	Mizu Tamago	Naoyuki Tatsuwa	Miku Ōshima	March 29, 2014
Chitoge reveals that she has a key that could unlock Raku's locket, but when they try, the key breaks. While Raku's locket is under repair, Raku thinks about who might be the one he made the promise to. Chitoge's father mentions that he recognized Kosaki from the past as the three were friends. Raku's father mentions he has a photo of the girl that Raku made a promise to ten years ago.
13	"After School"; Transliteration: "Hōkago" (Japanese: ホウカゴ)	Akio Watanabe	Tarō Kubo	Muneo Nakamoto	April 5, 2014
While happy that he has a nice picture of Kosaki, Raku struggles with finding the photo of the girl with whom he made a promise. At a study group, he nearly publicizes that he likes Kosaki. After Raku's father tells him the location, Raku discovers that the girl in the photo is someone else, and that she also has a different key. Raku shares his umbrella with Chitoge in the rain, but when the downpour gets heavy, they rest at a shelter and share the photos they ordered. Raku's father tells them that the girl in the photo is coming to school tomorrow and that she is actually Raku's fiancée.
14	"Ordeal"; Transliteration: "Shuraba" (Japanese: シュラバ)	Ume Aoki	Hitomi Ezoe	Yukito Kizawa	April 12, 2014
Baffled by the fact that the girl in the photo is Raku's fiancée, the aforementioned girl transfers in Raku's class as Marika Tachibana, the daughter of the police chief. She also bears a key that may unlock Raku's locket. Marika and Raku then head on a date, with Kosaki, Ruri, Seishirō and Chitoge spying on them. During their date, Marika bribes Raku into ending his relationship with Chitoge in exchange for answering all his questions regarding the girl and the promise he made ten years ago. Raku refuses, furthermore adding that he has no past memories with Marika, inciting within Marika her vulgar persona and bursts into a tantrum, causing Raku to finally recognize Marika.
15	"Three Keys"; Transliteration: "Sanbon" (Japanese: サンボン)	Mel Kishida	Kazuteru Ōhashi	Miku Ōshima	April 19, 2014
Finally having recognized Marika, the latter fills in Raku about their childhood days and how she molded herself into being Raku's ideal woman then kissing him on the cheek by surprise. With the existence of three keys further shadowing the true identity of the promise girl — in the midst of the confusion — Marika invites Raku to her home to pay respects to her father.
16	"Typhoon"; Transliteration: "Taifū" (Japanese: タイフウ)	Kouhaku Kuroboshi	Kōsuke Hirota	Yukito Kizawa	April 26, 2014
Raku was asked by Kosaki to help out at their family's sweets shop. While in the line of work, a strong typhoon forces Raku to stay at Kosaki's house for the time being. While under awkward silence at first, the pair eventually holds a proper conversation until the typhoon subsided — allowing Raku to head home safely — much to Raku's discontent. Nonetheless, Raku was able to exchange e-mail addresses with Kosaki as the latter feels proud of the progress she made with Raku.
17	"Temple Festival"; Transliteration: "Ennichi" (Japanese: エンニチ)	toi8	Naoyuki Tatsuwa	Yukito Kizawa	May 3, 2014
At a temple festival, Raku works in one of the food stalls being run by his faction's men. After bumping into Chitoge, she had Raku accompany her as a free pass to most of the stalls. When purchasing a relationship charm, Raku gets separated from Chitoge in the crowd and instead stumbles on Kosaki. Afterwards, Raku's relationship charm gets nabbed by a calico cat and Raku chases after it, passing by Marika then Seishirou. Meanwhile, a yukata-clad Chitoge finds Raku's charm and returns it to him. Reading a sign regarding the meaning behind relationship charms, Chitoge receives a relationship charm as an offer from Raku and mistakes it as a proposal.
18	"At the Beach"; Transliteration: "Umibede" (Japanese: ウミベデ)	Kentaro Yabuki	Tarō Kubo	Miku Ōshima	May 10, 2014
Raku and the gang go to a beach in the midst of their summer vacation. Chitoge develops romantic feelings for Raku, much to her anxiousness. Kosaki inadvertently asks an asleep Raku of allowing her to kiss him whereas Chitoge mishears it as Kosaki asking for kimchi. While trying to confirm her feelings, Chitoge is approached by Raku and asks him if they would make a functional couple. As a reply, Raku rebukes otherwise, much to Chitoge's heartbreak and causing her to storm off whilst leaving Raku an apology. During their new semester, Raku and Chitoge get nominated for playing the role of Romeo and Juliet for their upcoming cultural festival, but Chitoge refuses to take the role.
19	"The Play"; Transliteration: "Engeki" (Japanese: エンゲキ)	KEI	Kazuteru Ōhashi; Kōsuke Hirota	Muneo Nakamoto	May 17, 2014
Due to Chitoge's refusal of accepting the role in their play, Kosaki steps in and takes the role as Juliet with Raku as Romeo. Whilst in the midst of rehearsals, Raku and Chitoge gets into a heated argument over their fake relationship. As Raku vehemently states how dysfunctional things are between them and is considering to end their ties, Chitoge slaps Raku out of indignation. On the day of their play, Kosaki gets injured after rescuing a fellow classmate from a fall. With no one else to take over Kosaki in her role as Juliet, Raku approaches Chitoge and convinces her to take the part. After Raku apologizes and admits he doesn't despise Chitoge as the latter had presumed, Chitoge leans onto Raku and accepts the role as his Juliet.
20	"Showtime"; Transliteration: "Honban" (Japanese: ホンバン)	Naoshi Komi	Naoyuki Tatsuwa	Muneo Nakamoto	May 24, 2014
With Chitoge's inclusion into their cast, the play commences with Shu as the narrator taking their performance into a comedic turn, adding nonsensical subplots into the play's story for the enjoyment of the audience but for the chagrin to some of its casts. Nevertheless, the play finishes, gaining warm admiration from the audience while Chitoge recognizes her true love for Raku. With their usual relationship back in place, Chitoge apologizes to Raku for her harsh behavior and adds that she will still be herself in front of him. During a conversation with Kosaki, Raku takes notice of Kosaki's desire of playing the role of Juliet. To compensate for not having played her role, as a result Raku and Kosaki reprise their roles as Romeo and Juliet respectively and did a private play for themselves as Chitoge looks into the horizon and remarks the conclusion of their memorable cultural festival.
OVA–1	"Loss / Shrine Maiden"; Transliteration: "Funjitsu / Mikosan" (Japanese: フンシツ / ミコサン)	-	Kōsuke Hirota; Naoyuki Tatsuwa	Miku Ōshima	October 3, 2014
Ruri has lost her glasses and asks Raku and Kosaki to find them. Raku asks Ruri if Kosaki is in love with somebody and Ruri confirms she does, devastating Raku. Ruri scolds Raku for not knowing who Kosaki likes and almost tells him Kosaki loves him, but is stopped by Shu, who believes it is better Raku work it out for himself. Raku and Kosaki end up finding the glasses together. Raku's heartbreak at finding out Kosaki likes someone annoys Ruri so she lies and tells Raku she had been joking and that Kosaki isn't in love with anybody, curing his depression. She agrees with Shu it is best to let Raku and Kosaki work things out themselves. Raku, Chitoge, Kosaki, Marika and Seishiro are working at a shrine for New Year's Eve. Raku is possessed by spirits and has nothing but bad luck all day. The priestess believes that because Raku is surrounded by pretty girls he is being haunted by the spirits of unpopular boys, and unless they are expelled by midnight, Raku may end up dead. The girls are given an exorcism talisman that will expel the spirits, but only if someone sticks it on his naked butt. Chitoge attempts to forcefully remove Raku's underwear but ruins the talisman in the process. As the girls are wearing holy shrine maiden outfits they could expel the spirits by hugging Raku for a whole minute. Kosaki hugs Raku, which embarrasses them both and also fails to expel the spirits. With midnight approaching the only remaining way to save Raku is to force him to drink holy water, but it will only work if administered mouth to mouth, meaning someone has to kiss Raku. All four girls immediately take a mouthful of water and charge at Raku. During the chase Raku collides with the shrines holy bell and the spirits are instantly expelled. Despite being fully purified the Priestess believes Raku's bad luck with women will only get worse.
OVA–2	"Work / Change"; Transliteration: "Oshigoto / Henbo" (Japanese: ヘンボウ/ オシゴト)	-	Naoyuki Tatsuwa; Kōsuke Hirota	Miku Ōshima	February 4, 2015
Raku and Chitoge go to a restaurant where Marika has a part time job as a waitress, though she is not very good at it and the manager only tolerates her constant mistakes because her cheerful personality draws in a lot of customers. The restaurant is suddenly swamped by both Raku's fathers Yakuza gang and Chitoge's fathers Beehive Gangsters. Raku and Chitoge pretend to be on a lovey dovey date so both gangs will behave. A fight almost breaks out when Marika hugs Raku in front of everybody. Marika's fathers riot police also arrive and a three way fight between the Yakuza, police and gangsters almost destroys the restaurant. As this would put Marika out of a job she angrily drops her polite, feminine persona and throws all three gangs out of the restaurant by herself, shocking everybody. She admits she values her job because she is saving up to pay for her and Raku's wedding and a house. At her home Marika, who has dutifully saved all the money she has earned, has a picture Raku drew from 10 years ago of his ideal house. Raku's friends visit his house for a meal on New Years Day. Raku serves chocolates and Chitoge begins acting strangely and asks Raku to kiss her. Raku realises the chocolates contained whisky and Chitoge is drunk. She keeps trying to kiss him, jealous that he had once kissed Marika, who suddenly interrupts them, also drunk, and beats up Shu. Seishiro is likewise drunk and almost succeeds in kissing him, though he manages to trick her and she instead kisses a statue. Kosaki, also drunk, asks Raku to help her undress. When he refuses she almost molests him before he escapes. Chitoge demands to know if Raku likes her as more than just a fake girlfriend and threatens to tear his clothes off and molest him unless he admits he loves her. Raku is surrounded by Chitoge, Marika, Seishiro and Kosaki who all grab him. Raku wakes up later with a headache unable to remember anything that happened. All four girls, now sober, agree amongst themselves to never again speak about the things they did to Raku.
OVA–3	"Bath House / Service"; Transliteration: "Sentō / Sābisu" (Japanese: セントウ / サ一ビス)	-	Naoyuki Tatsuwa	Miku Ōshima	April 3, 2015
Raku visits a public bathhouse where he meets Chitoge who visited the same bathhouse by coincidence. Chitoge is joined in the women's bath by Marika and her female bodyguard, Honda. When Marika realises Raku is on the other side of the wall in the men's bath she attempts to join him but is stopped by Chitoge who then punishes Raku for seeing her in a towel. Kosaki and her sister Haru also enter the women's bath. Raku, who does not see them, is asked by the owner to watch the front desk while she runs an errand. As the only staff member Raku is asked by another customer to fix a broken tap in the women's bath so he blindfolds himself and goes to find the tap. He almost gropes Kosaki's breasts while searching for the tap but is beaten up by Haru so he returns to the front desk. Meanwhile Chitoge and Marika try and outlast each other in a sauna and end up passing out. While removing them from the sauna Chitoge's towel falls off completely. When the owner returns she finds Raku unconscious behind the desk. All the girls visit a mountain hot spring together while Raku and Shu are forced to go to the men's hot spring on the other side of the mountain in case they try to peek. Marika notices that Seishiro's breasts have grown again and can't resist groping them. The girls put all their cell phones, clothes and underwear in a large bag, but an erupting geyser blows the bag all the way to the other side of the mountain where it lands in a tree inside the men's hot spring close to where the oblivious Raku is bathing. The naked girls distract Raku from the bushes while Chitoge attempts to retrieve the bag. She is almost seen by Raku and hides underwater in the hot spring. Another distraction allows Chitoge to escape without the bag while Raku believes he is being stalked by an animal. With the bag close to falling out of the tree and being discovered Kosaki sneaks into the hot spring while Raku is washing his hair but becomes too flustered when Raku touches her hand while looking for the soap and flees without the bag. Raku, now completely freaked out backs up against the tree. With the bag about to fall Chitoge accidentally leans against the wall which collapses, exposing all the naked girls to Raku. Chitoge beats him up until he gets amnesia and retrieves the bag. Elsewhere, Shu, who has spent two hours climbing the dangerous part of the mountain to peek at the women's hot spring, ends up falling back down the mountain when he realises the girls are not there.

=== Nisekoi Season 2 ===
No.	Title	Directed by	Written by	Original release date
1	"From Now On / Please Notice"; Transliteration: "Korekara / Kizuite" (Japanese: コレカラ / キヅイテ)	Yukihiro Miyamoto	Miku Ōshima	April 10, 2015
Acknowledging her feelings for Raku, Chitoge contemplates on how they will progress as fake lovers from now on. Raku's locket is returned but not completely repaired, preventing them from unlocking it, which in turn, the identity of the girl Raku made a promise will be revealed with Chitoge later ruminating of the possibility being not the promised girl. In hopes to get Raku's attention, Chitoge makes constant refurbishes to her appearance to which Raku constantly fails to notice. However, Raku reveals that he is aware of Chitoge's attempts but refuses to make a remark about it out of embarrassment.
2	"Fate / Showdown"; Transliteration: "In'nen / Shōbu" (Japanese: インネン / ショウブ)	Kenjirou Okada	Miku Ōshima	April 17, 2015
Paula McCoy reunites with her former colleague Seishirō in a clash leading Raku to get injured in the crossfire. Disappointed by her peer's lax lifestyle and intent on surpassing her after being called flat-chested in their first meeting, Paula challenges Seishirō in a match where the victor must steal a kiss from Raku. Despite the protest from Raku and Seishirō, their duel ensues where Raku is eventually captured by Paula. Seishirō soon locates Paula and after winning their match by giving Raku an indirect kiss, embraces Paula and praising her for her skills. Before leaving for America, Paula asks Seishirō if she is fine with Raku being her mistress' lover whereas Seishirō feigns ignorance.
3	"Need"; Transliteration: "Hitsuyou" (Japanese: ヒツヨウ)	Kōsuke Hirota	Muneo Nakamoto	April 24, 2015
Chitoge's feared workaholic mother, Hana, arrives in the midst of the holidays and Chitoge invites Raku in welcoming her. After a rocky meeting with her husband and daughter, Hana appoints Raku as her new secretary to test his worth as her daughter's lover; if Raku succeeds on meeting Hana's expectations and gains her approval, she will reward Raku and Chitoge a one night-stay in a premium hotel suite on Christmas Eve. While Raku feels overwhelmed by Hana's tight schedule and tensed by the workload assigned to him, Chitoge makes a call to her mother and asks that they bond together as mother and daughter on Christmas Eve. Declining her daughter's request under the pretense of being busy, Raku scolds Hana for prioritizing her job over her daughter.
4	"Mother"; Transliteration: "Hahaoya" (Japanese: ハハオヤ)	Tarō Kubo	Muneo Nakamoto	May 1, 2015
By clearing all of Hana's appointments, Raku asks Hana to go bond with her daughter. Refusing out of anxiousness, Hana states that she has always cared for her daughter and is proud of her achievements but is under a misunderstanding of Chitoge despising her. Raku immediately picks up Chitoge to arrange a date for her and her mother but is too late as Hana boards a plane to America. After hearing the cries of her daughter, Hana swiftly returns to reconcile with Chitoge. After seeing off Hana at the airport, Raku and Chitoge clear up the misunderstanding of them staying together in hotel suite during a Christmas party. Meanwhile, Hana remembers seeing Raku's locket in Chitoge's picture book and contemplates on whenever she will meet Raku again.
5	"Teach Me / Master Raku"; Transliteration: "Oshiete / Raku-sama" (Japanese: オシエテ / ラクサマ)	Midori Yoshizawa	Yukito Kizawa	May 8, 2015
Being placed low in their rankings and having to prepare for a math test the next day, Marika turns to Raku for a tutoring session with Chitoge tagging along. Despite this, however, Marika intentionally fails her math test to get Raku to tutor her once more. With plans to go on a trip, Marika entrusts Raku her pet parrot - Master Raku - for a day. Escaping his cage, Marika's pet parrot causes a commotion in the surrounding neighborhood and misunderstandings to the girl that encounters it. Raku eventually retrieves the parrot by shouting a phrase declaring his love for Marika, which the latter later uses as a recording in training her parrot into saying it.
6	"Delicious"; Transliteration: "Oishī" (Japanese: オイシイ)	Hitomi Ezoe	Miku Ōshima	May 15, 2015
Chitoge, Kosaki and Marika attempt to present their respective homemade chocolates to Raku on Valentine's Day. While Marika prepares a statue-sized chocolate, Kosaki accidentally trips and falls over hers - crumbling it - as she attempts to give it to Raku, much to her dismay. After receiving obligatory chocolate from Seishirō, Raku stumbles to find Marika and her chocolate in pieces; apologetic, Raku eats Marika's chocolate. With both of them intent of giving their chocolates to their crushes, Chitoge and Kosaki work together to make their own. By the end of the day, Chitoge and Kosaki manage to give their respective chocolates to Raku.
7	"Little Sister"; Transliteration: "Imōto" (Japanese: イモウト)	Kazuteru Ōhashi	Muneo Nakamoto	May 22, 2015
Despite feeling optimistic for her upcoming high school life, Haru faints after stumbling into a group of thugs but — unbeknownst to Haru — Raku saves her. While intent on knowing the identity of the 'prince' that rescued her, Haru meets Raku but eventually recognizes him from rumors of being a dangerous, womanizing gangster. After Raku unintentionally catches a glimpse of Haru's underwear twice, Haru vows to protect her sister — Kosaki — from Raku while in bewilderment of his popularity with some of the girls. After Kosaki tells Haru about Raku's good sides, Haru has in her possession the clue into finding her 'prince', Raku's pendant.
8	"Magical Pâtissière Kosaki / Work"; Transliteration: "Majikarupatishie Kosaki-chan! ! / Hatarake" (Japanese: マジカルパティシエ小咲ちゃん!! / ハタラケ)	Yuki Yase	Miku Ōshima	May 29, 2015
Kosaki, Chitoge and Marika were bestowed upon powers of a magical girl who shall preserve peace in the world with Kosaki serving as their leader. Defeating a giant evil minion, the group then faces against the perverted mastermind behind the minion's creation, Doctor Maiko. After a short farce, Doctor Maiko is blasted away. Short in staff, Raku is called to help in the Onodera family sweets shop, much to Haru's protest. Haru develops mixed feelings towards having things in common with Raku and his competence in the kitchen. Raku and Haru soon find themselves being scolded for breaking kitchen utensils.
9	"Cleanup Day / Visiting the Sick"; Transliteration: "Osouji / Omimau" (Japanese: オソウジ / オミマウ)	Kōsuke Hirota	Yukito Kizawa	June 5, 2015
Homeroom adviser, Kyoko, assigns Raku to rally his friends to clean the school's swimming pool. Finishing their assignment, the group decides to frolic as Raku convinces an unsociable Paula to join them. Ruri calls Raku to take her place in taking care of a sickened Kosaki, much to Haru's chagrin. However, Raku is also prompted to look after Haru after she catches Kosaki's cold. Moved by Raku nursing both sisters, Haru returns to him his locket.
10	"Support"; Transliteration: "Ouen" (Japanese: オウエン)	Midori Yoshizawa	Yukito Kizawa	June 12, 2015
As the gang graduates to being second-year students, Ruri continues to frown over Shu's over-ecstatic tendencies. In his talk with Ruri, Raku realizes that he does not know about Shu's romantic interests and sets to ask the latter. Finding no straight answer from Shu, Raku consults with Seishirō about unrequited romances. Homeroom adviser Kyoko announces to her students her retirement and eventual marriage. Shu admits to Raku that his romantic crush is Kyoko but holds up confessing to her. But after further romantic advises from Seishirō, Raku convinces Shu to declare his love to Kyoko. Inspired by his best friend's example, Raku commits himself to confess to Kosaki someday.
11	"I Want to Lose Weight / Good Morning"; Transliteration: "Yasetai / Ohayō" (Japanese: ヤセタイ / オハヨウ)	Kenjirou Okada	Miku Ōshima	June 19, 2015
Kosaki assumes she is gaining weight after checking their scale and prevents herself from eating excessively which proves to be difficult for her. Noticing Kosaki's adversity, Raku tries to present her with her favorite treat but Kosaki storms off. In the end, Raku advises Kosaki to have a proper diet due to her slender figure. Meanwhile, Haru discovers that their scale is defective. As middle-schoolers, Kosaki and Raku were classmates with the former being in love with the latter. In her pursuit of love, Kosaki tries hard to enroll in the same school as Raku but ends up failing in the entrance exams, much to her depression. Whilst being together with Raku, Kosaki receives news that she actually passed the test as she looks forward to interacting with Raku again.
12	"The Search / Just Testing"; Transliteration: "Sousaku / Otameshi" (Japanese: ソウサク / オタメシ)	Hajime Ootani	Yukito Kizawa	June 26, 2015
In her rush to school for being late, Chitoge lost her ribbon. The gang forms a search party for the said ribbon but no avail. After Raku fails to gull Chitoge with a newly-bought ribbon, Chitoge dashes to retrieve her real ribbon at a distance but is seemingly ripped apart by a passing train. However, Raku reveals that the wrecked ribbon was actually his and Chitoge's ribbon is safe at his hands, much to Chitoge's excitement. After reading a light novel, Chitoge practices in confessing her love to Raku which is constantly hindered by embarrassment. But after consulting her father and Raku, Chitoge decides to postpone her confession for the time being and use it to spend more time with her fake boyfriend.
OVA–4	"Honeymoon / Magical Pâtissière Kosaki!"; Transliteration: "Shinkon / Majikarupatishie Kosaki-chan!" (Japanese: シンコン / マジカルパティシエ小咲ちゃん！！)	Yukihiro Miyamoto; Yuki Yase	Miku Ōshima	January 4, 2016
Raku has separate dreams of having a married life with Kosaki, Marika, Seishirō and Chitoge, whom each also share the same dream with Raku. Magical princess and ruler of the Land of Magic, Yui Kanakura, tasks Kosaki and her comrades to exterminate Doctor Maiko for good. During their last stand, Yui provides the girls with more protective yet skimpier outfits to shield themselves against Doctor Maiko's attacks. However as Doctor Maiko proves to be impervious as well, sage Rurin steps in and easily defeats Doctor Maiko. With peace restored and back to their everyday lives, Rurin surprisingly appears before Kosaki assigning her with a new task and 'transforms' her in the middle of her class, appearing naked before her classmates.

== Theme song list ==
=== Season 1 - Nisekoi ===
Opening Theme
Title	Artist	Episode(s)	
"CLICK"	ClariS	2 - 14	
"STEP"	ClariS	15 - 19	
Ending Theme
Title	Artist	TV Episode(s)	BD/DVD Episode(s)
"CLICK"	ClariS	1	
"Heart Pattern"	Nao Tōyama	2 - 5	2
"Recover Decoration" (リカバーデコレーション)	Kana Hanazawa	10 - 13	3 - 5
"STEP"	ClariS	14	
"TRICK BOX"	Mikako Komatsu	6 - 8, 15, 17	6 - 8
"Order×Order" (オーダー×オーダー)	Yumi Uchiyama	-	9 - 11
"Hanagonomi" (はなごのみ)	Kana Asumi	18 - 19	12 - 13
"Souzou Diary" (想像ダイアリー)	Nao Tōyama, Kana Hanazawa, Mikako Komatsu & Kana Asumi	20	15 - 17, 20
"Taisetsu no Tsukurikata" (大切の作り方)	Nao Tōyama & Kana Hanazawa	-	18 - 19

=== Season 2 - Nisekoi: ===
Opening Theme
Title	Artist	TV Episode(s)
"Rally Go Round"	LiSA	1 - 7, 9, 11 - 12
"Magical☆Styling" (マギカル☆スタイルング)	Kana Hanazawa	8
Ending Theme
Title	Artist	TV Episode(s)
"Aimai Hertz" (曖昧ヘルツ)	Nao Tōyama, Kana Hanazawa, Mikako Komatsu, & Kana Asumi	1, 3, 6, 9, 12
"TrIGgER"	Mikako Komatsu	2
"Sleep Zzz..."	Nao Tōyama	4
"Matadō Love" (またどーらぶ)	Kana Asumi	5
"marchen ticktack"	Ayane Sakura	7
"Toriame drop" (通り雨drop)	Yumi Uchiyama	10
"Crayon Cover" (クレヨンカバー)	Kana Hanazawa	11

== Broadcast ==
The series is currently being aired on a number of channels in Japan. The following is a list of the TV Channels on which the episodes are currently being broadcast along with the timing and day of the week it is aired on and the date the first episode was aired on the channel. The anime is aired weekly in all of the following channels. With the exception of Terebihokkaido and TVQ Kyushu Broadcasting where it is aired on Wednesdays and Tuesdays respectively, the anime is streamed on all of the channels on Saturdays. Some of the schedule times are for after midnight, for instance, Chibaterebi's Saturday 24:30 broadcast on January 11 takes place on Sunday 12:30 am on January 12. Occasionally the stations will adjust their schedules for other programming. It is also simulcast to Crunchyroll for premium users on Saturdays 9:00 am PDT.

No.	T.V. Station	Timing	Day	Premiere date
1	MBS	26:28	Saturdays	January 11, 2014
2	Tokyo MX	23:30	Saturdays	January 11, 2014
3	Chiba TV	24:30	Saturdays	January 11, 2014
4	tvk	24:30	Saturdays	January 11, 2014
5	Television Saitama	24:30	Saturdays	January 11, 2014
6	Tochigi TV	23:30	Saturdays	January 11, 2014
7	Gunma TV	23:30	Saturdays	January 11, 2014
8	TV Aichi	25:50	Saturdays	January 11, 2014
9	Television Hokkaido	26:05	Wednesdays	January 15, 2014
10	TVQ Kyushu Broadcasting	26:35	Tuesdays	January 14, 2014
11	BS11	23:30	Saturdays	January 18, 2014
