= Nobuhiro Sugiyama =

Japanese animator & director

Nobuhiro Sugiyama 杉山 延寛
- Occupations: Animator, character designer, and storyboard artist
- Years active: 2001–present
- Employer: Shaft (2001–)
- Known for: Nisekoi; March Comes In like a Lion; RWBY: Ice Queendom

Nobuhiro Sugiyama (Japanese: 杉山 延寛, Hepburn: Sugiyama Nobuhiro) is a Japanese animator, character designer, and storyboard artist.

== Career ==
Sugiyama joined Shaft in 2001 as an in-between animator while he was interested in drawing a variety of subjects and learning from the industry. By 2003 he was a key animator, and by 2004 an animation director. In 2007, Sugiyama was chosen to design the characters for the studio's adaptation of the Ef visual novel. Sugiyama became one of the studio's primary character designers and chief animation directors and was again given the task of heading the Arakawa Under the Bridge project in 2010. In 2011, Sugiyama was opposite of character designer Asako Nishida in acting as the chief animation director for Ground Control to Psychoelectric Girl. Nishida commented on herself, the main animators, and Sugiyama being especially particular about the drawings of character's legs in the work. In 2014, he was given responsibility of designing the characters for the Nisekoi anime adaptation.

Shaft was approached to adapt the March Comes In like a Lion shogi manga around the time of Nisekoi's production. Chica Umino, the author, was a fan of Shaft and their chief director Akiyuki Shinbo's works and had decided that she didn't want an anime adaptation if it was not by the Shaft-Shinbo team. Through a series of events involving her editor from Hakusensha, Ryou Tomoda, being approached by Tohokushinsha Film producer Makoto Tanaka (the son of famed shogi player Torahiko Tanaka) about the possibility of an anime and getting a meeting with Aniplex producer Atsuhiro Iwakami and Shaft's president Mitsutoshi Kubota, the series was greenlit. Umino initially wanted several aspects of the anime to be aesthetically reminiscent of the team's Bakemonogatari series, which she was a fan of, and included her wanting Akio Watanabe to draw the character designs. Shinbo didn't think that it was a good idea, and Watanabe was busy so the schedule didn't align; and instead the role of character designer fell to Sugiyama. The series began airing in 2016, and Sugiyama was joined by Shiotsuki as co-chief animation director, with a second season airing in 2017. According to Shinbo, a key difference between the two seasons was the level of familiarity the staff had with the work and the incorporation of their own styles into it, which he noted in particular for Sugiyama.

He was chosen as one of the chief animation directors for Magia Record alongside Hiroki Yamamura and character designer Junichirou Taniguchi in 2020. He had only been involved in the original Puella Magi Madoka Magica series to a minor degree in which he did key animation for the first episode. Taniguchi was not strict about the differing styles in animation in different scenes from the animators and thought positively of showing their characteristics, like when drawings are given stylish flare in battle scenes; but he was particular about cut-by-cut depictions. Sugiyama closely watched Taniguchi's work in the first episode to try and imitate his drawings and worked on certain episodes alongside Yamamura, with the two splitting the work more on a scene basis than by segment of an episode. Yamamura generally supervised the action scenes, while Sugiyama did the "daily life" parts, as Yamamura struggled with depicting the characters "cutely" as opposed to Sugiyama. Yamamura thought that some of Sugiyama's work in the second episode was impressive, so he referenced scenes that Sugiyama supervised to make his own drawings cuter. Sugiyama mainly worked as an animation director on the series aside from Kenjirou Okada personally requesting that Sugiyama draw the layouts to one of the scenes in episode 3.

Sugiyama did not return for the second and final seasons of Magia Record in a major capacity as he became busy with another project. In 2022, Shaft debuted RWBY: Ice Queendom, an anime series based on the RWBY web series created by Monty Oum and Rooster Teeth. Talks about a RWBY anime had extended back to the mid-2010s when Oum had spoken with Good Smile Company CEO Takanori Aki, where the latter found out that Oum was a fan of artist Huke's work and was interested in making an anime-related work. Three weeks after their final meeting, Oum suffered an allergic reaction and passed away. Aki was still interested in pushing for the project they had worked on, and staff from Rooster Teeth later visited studios Shaft and Trigger, with production officially underway at Shaft in 2020. Huke was asked to re-adapt the designs from the web series, as well as design the new outfits that were to appear in Ice Queendom. Sugiyama was given the responsibility of then adapting Huke's redesigns for animation, as well as acting as the chief animation director alongside Yamamura, Yoshiaki Itou, and Rina Iwamoto. Director Toshimasa Suzuki noted that the team and Sugiyama faced various difficulties during production, as not only were they working on the project as its own story set between seasons of the main franchise, but that they also needed to be cognizant of certain aspects of the continuity and design sensibilities in relation to volumes that were still releasing. Despite the difficulties, Suzuki praised Sugiyama for his supervision of the drawings and designs.

=== Influence ===
Sugiyama's work had a profound effect on his Shaft colleague Kazuya Shiotsuki, who called Sugiyama's Nisekoi character sheets and key visual drawings to be "god-like". When asked who had influenced him the most, Shiotsuki named Sugiyama. Nisekoi manga artist Naoshi Komi also noted a significant influence on his work from Sugiyama. Komi described Sugiyama's drawings of the cast to be feminine and admired them, and when he first saw the designs and drawings for the anime, he considered them to be "unbeatable" and said that he sometimes imports Sugiyama's drawings and learns by copying them.

Animator and character designer Akane Yano was also largely influenced by Sugiyama in particular through his work on Ef. Though broadly influenced by the series' visual style, she noted Sugiyama's character drawing style and clothing as specifically influencing her work. After graduating from vocational school, she had a brief stint as a freelance animator at Shaft where she was given a desk and happened to be put on Nisekoi, which she said gave her the opportunity to get his autograph.

== Works ==
=== Television series ===
Year	Title	Director(s)	Studio	CD (Note: Character designer.)	CAD (Note: Chief animation director.)	AD (Note: Animation director.)	KA (Note: Key animator.)	Other roles and notes	Ref(s)
2001	Cyborg 009: The Cyborg Soldier	Jun Kawagoe	Japan Vistec	No	No	No	No	In-between animator	
2001	Okojo-san	Yuusuke Yamamoto	Radix	No	No	No	No	In-between animator	
2002	G-On Riders	Shinichiro Kimura	TNK; Shaft	No	No	No	No	In-between animator	
2002	Mahoromatic: Something More Beautiful	Hiroyuki Yamaga	Gainax; Shaft	No	No	No	No	In-between animator	
2002	Heat Guy J	Kazuki Akane	Satelight	No	No	No	No	In-between animator	
2003	Dear Boys	Susumu Kudou	A.C.G.T	No	No	No	Yes		
2003	Popotan	Shinichiro Kimura	Shaft	No	No	No	Yes	In-between check	
2003	Maburaho	Shinichiro Kimura	J.C.Staff	No	No	No	Yes		
2004	Misaki Chronicles	Hiroshi Negishi; Jun Takada	Radix	No	No	No	Yes		
2004	This Ugly yet Beautiful World	Shouji Saeki	Gaianx; Shaft	No	No	No	Yes	In-between check	
2004	Tetsujin 28-gou	Yasuhiro Imagawa	Palm Studio	No	No	No	Yes	In-between animator	
2004	Gakuen Alice	Takahiro Omori	Group TAC	No	No	No	Yes		
2004	Tsukuyomi: Moon Phase	Akiyuki Shinbo	Shaft	No	No	Yes	Yes	Assistant animation director 2nd key animator	
2004	Uta Kata	Keiji Gotoh	Hal Film Maker	No	No	No	Yes		
2005	He is My Master	Shouji Saeki	Gainax; Shaft	No	No	No	Yes		
2005	Pani Poni Dash!	Akiyuki Shinbo; Shin Oonuma	Shaft	No	No	Yes	Yes		
2006	REC	Ryūtarō Nakamura	Shaft	No	No	No	Yes		
2006	Negima!?	Akiyuki Shinbo; Shin Oonuma	Shaft	No	No	Yes	Yes	Assistant animation director	
2007	Hidamari Sketch	Akiyuki Shinbo; Ryouki Kamitsubo	Shaft	No	No	No	Yes		
2007	Sayonara, Zetsubou-Sensei	Akiyuki Shinbo	Shaft	No	No	No	Yes		
2007	A Tale of Memories	Shin Oonuma	Shaft	Yes	Yes	Yes	Yes		
2008	Hidamari Sketch x 365	Akiyuki Shinbo	Shaft	No	No	No	Yes		
2008	Ef: A Tale of Melodies	Shin Oonuma	Shaft	Yes	Yes	Yes	No		
2009	Natsu no Arashi!	Akiyuki Shinbo; Shin Oonuma	Shaft	No	No	No	Yes		
2009	Bakemonogatari	Akiyuki Shinbo; Tatsuya Oishi	Shaft	No	No	Yes	Yes	Storyboard artist Assistant animation director	
2009	Zan Sayonara, Zetsubou-Sensei	Akiyuki Shinbo; Yukihiro Miyamoto	Shaft	No	No	No	Yes		
2009	Natsu no Arashi! Akinai-chuu	Akiyuki Shinbo; Shin Oonuma	Shaft	No	No	Yes	No		
2010	Hidamari Sketch x Hoshimittsu	Akiyuki Shinbo; Kenichi Ishikura	Shaft	No	No	Yes	Yes		
2010	Arakawa Under the Bridge	Akiyuki Shinbo; Yukihiro Miyamoto	Shaft	Yes	Yes	Yes	Yes		
2011	Puella Magi Madoka Magica	Akiyuki Shinbo; Yukihiro Miyamoto	Shaft	No	No	No	Yes		
2011	Ground Control to Psychoelectric Girl	Akiyuki Shinbo; Yukihiro Miyamoto	Shaft	No	Yes	Yes	Yes	Storyboard artist	
2012	Nisemonogatari	Akiyuki Shinbo; Tomoyuki Itamura	Shaft	No	Yes	Yes	Yes		
2012	Nekomonogatari: Black	Akiyuki Shinbo; Tomoyuki Itamura	Shaft	No	Yes	No	No		
2013	Monogatari Series Second Season	Akiyuki Shinbo; Tomoyuki Itamura; Naoyuki Tatsuwa; Yuki Yase	Shaft	No	Yes	Yes	No	Storyboard artist	
2014	Nisekoi	Akiyuki Shinbo; Naoyuki Tatsuwa	Shaft	Yes	Yes	No	No		
2015	Gourmet Girl Graffiti	Akiyuki Shinbo; Naoyuki Tatsuwa	Shaft	No	No	No	No	Storyboard artist	
2015	Nisekoi:	Akiyuki Shinbo; Yukihiro Miyamoto	Shaft	Yes	Yes	No	Yes		
2015	Owarimonogatari	Akiyuki Shinbo; Tomoyuki Itamura	Shaft	No	No	Yes	No		
2016	March Comes In like a Lion	Akiyuki Shinbo; Kenjirou Okada	Shaft	Yes	Yes	Yes	No		
2017	March Comes In like a Lion 2nd Season	Akiyuki Shinbo; Kenjirou Okada	Shaft	Yes	Yes	Yes	No		
2018	Fate/Extra: Last Encore	Akiyuki Shinbo; Yukihiro Miyamoto	Shaft	No	No	Yes	Yes		
2019	Zoku Owarimonogatari	Akiyuki Shinbo	Shaft	No	No	Yes	No		
2019	The Quintessential Quintuplets	Satoshi Kuwabara	Tezuka Productions	No	No	Yes	Yes		
2020	Magia Record	Doroinu; Yukihiro Miyamoto; Kenjirou Okada; Midori Yoshizawa	Shaft	No	Yes	Yes	Yes		
2020	Assault Lily Bouquet	Shouji Saeki; Hajime Ootani	Shaft	No	No	No	Yes		
2021	Pretty Boy Detective Club	Akiyuki Shinbo; Hajime Ootani	Shaft	No	No	No	No	Assistant chief animation director	
2021	Magia Record: The Eve of Awakening	Doroinu; Yukihiro Miyamoto	Shaft	No	No	Yes	No	Assistant chief animation director	
2022	Magia Record: Dawn of a Shallow Dream	Doroinu; Yukihiro Miyamoto	Shaft	No	No	No	Yes		
2022	RWBY: Ice Queendom	Toshimasa Suzuki; Kenjirou Okada	Shaft	Yes	Yes	Yes	No		
2025	A Ninja and an Assassin Under One Roof	Yukihiro Miyamoto	Shaft	No	No	Yes	Yes		
TBA	Just Like Mona Lisa	Kana Shundo	Shaft	Yes	Yes	TBA	TBA		

=== OVAs/ONAs ===
Year	Title	Director(s)	Studio	CD	CAD	AD	KA	Other roles and notes	Ref(s)
2002	Arcade Gamer Fubuki	Yuuji Mutou	Shaft	No	No	No	No	In-between animator	
2003	Papillon Rose	Shinji Tobita	Studio Kelmadick	No	No	No	Yes		
2003	Temptation	Juuhachi Minamizawa	Arcturus	No	No	No	Yes		
2006	Negima: Spring Special	Akiyuki Shinbo; Shin Oonuma	Shaft	No	No	No	Yes		
2009	Zan Sayonara, Zetsubou-Sensei Bangaichi	Akiyuki Shinbo; Yukihiro Miyamoto	Shaft	No	No	Yes	Yes		
2014	Nisekoi	Akiyuki Shinbo; Naoyuki Tatsuwa	Shaft	Yes	Yes	No	No		
2016	Nisekoi:	Akiyuki Shinbo; Yukihiro Miyamoto	Shaft	Yes	Yes	No	No		
2024	Monogatari Series Off & Monster Season	Akiyuki Shinbo; Midori Yoshizawa	Shaft	No	Yes	Yes	No		

=== Films ===
Year	Title	Director(s)	Studio	CD	CAD	AD	KA	Other roles and notes	Ref(s)
2007	Kino's Journey: Country of Illness	Ryūtarō Nakamura	Shaft	No	No	No	Yes		

== Notes ==
=== Works cited ===
- Kizawa, Yukito, ed. (2013). ひだまりスケッチデイズ -TVアニメ公式ガイドブック- [Hidamari Sketch Days: TV Anime Official Guidebook]. Houbunsha. ISBN 978-4832277403.
- Miki, Minami (January 24, 2018). アニメ「3月のライオン」新房昭之×友田亮対談 [Anime "March Comes In like a Lion" Akiyuki Shinbo x Ryou Tomoda Talk]. Natalie (in Japanese).
- Takahashi, Yumi, ed. (November 23, 2019). Akiyuki Shimbo x Shaft Chronicle (in Japanese). Dotcom. ISBN 978-4835457017.
- Maeda, Hisashi; Nakagami, Yoshikatsu; Kawabata, Takeshi; Nishitani, Nanako (2020). マギアレコード 魔法少女まどか☆マギカ外伝 TVアニメ公式ガイドブック 1巻 [Magia Record Puella Magi Madoka Magica TV Anime Official Guidebook Volume 1] (in Japanese). Houbunsha. ISBN 978-4832272019.
- Maeda, Hisashi; Nakagami, Yoshikatsu; Kawabata, Takeshi; Nishitani, Nanako (2022). マギアレコード 魔法少女まどか☆マギカ外伝 TVアニメ公式ガイドブック 2巻 [Magia Record Puella Magi Madoka Magica TV Anime Official Guidebook Volume 2] (in Japanese). Houbunsha. ISBN 978-4832274006.
