= Ordeal =

Ordeal may refer to:

- Trial by ordeal, a religious judicial practice to determine "the will of God"

== Books ==
- Ordeal (autobiography), a 1980 autobiography of Linda Lovelace
- Ordeal (trilogy), 1918–1941 novel trilogy by Aleksey Nikolayevich Tolstoy
- Ordeal, the American title of What Happened to the Corbetts, a 1939 novel by Nevil Shute

== Film and television ==
- The Ordeal (film), a 1922 American silent drama
- Ordeal, a 1973 American television film for American Broadcasting Company
- Calvaire (film), also known as The Ordeal, a 2004 psychological horror film

=== Television episodes ===
- "Ordeal", 18 Wheels of Justice season 1, episode 7 (2000)
- "Ordeal", Broken Arrow season 1, episode 28 (1957)
- "Ordeal", Doctor Elise episode 5 (2024)
- "Ordeal", Dr. Simon Locke season 2, episode 24 (1973)
- "Ordeal", GE True episode 24 (1963)
- "Ordeal", High Mountain Rangers episode 10 (1988)
- "Ordeal", Minsan pa Nating Hagkan ang Nakaraan episode 41 (2023)
- "Ordeal", Nisekoi season 1, episode 14 (2014)
- "Ordeal", Paris 7000 episode 6 (1970)
- "Ordeal", The Defenders (1961), season 2, episode 10 (1963)
- "Ordeal", The F.B.I. season 2, episode 7 (1966)
- "Ordeal", The Nurses season 2, episode 8 (1968)
- "Ordeal", The Rifleman season 2, episode 8 (1959)
- "Ordeal", UFO episode 19 (1971)
- "The Ordeal", Blindspotting season 1, episode 1 (2021)
- "The Ordeal", Bronk episode 22 (1976)
- "The Ordeal", Doctor Who season 1, episode 10; episode 6 of The Daleks (1964)
- "The Ordeal", The Adventures of Robin Hood series 1, episode 11 (1955)
- "The Ordeal", The Brothers series 7, episode 15 (1976)
- "The Ordeal", The Cowboys episode 8 (1974)
- "The Ordeal", The Name of the Game season 1, episode 10 (1968)
- "The Ordeal", The Virginian season 7, episode 19 (1969)
- "The Ordeal", The Waltons season 2, episodes 21–22 (1978)
- "The Ordeal", Vilangu episode 6 (2022)

== Other uses ==
- Ordeal (album), by Skepticism
- Ordeal (horse) (born 1957), New Zealand Standardbred racemare
- Ordeal (level of OA membership), the first degree of membership in the Order of the Arrow, an organization within the Boy Scouts of America

== See also ==
- Erythrophleum suaveolens or ordeal tree, named for its use in a trial by ordeal
