= Setoutsumi =

- Poster

Japanese name
- Kanji: セトウツミ
- Directed by: Tatsushi Ōmori
- Written by: Dai Miyazaki; Tatsushi Ōmori
- Based on: Setoutsumi by Kazuya Konomoto
- Produced by: Takahiko Kondo; Dai Miyazaki
- Starring: Sosuke Ikematsu; Masaki Suda; Ayami Nakajo
- Cinematography: Fūta Takagi
- Edited by: Ryo Hayano
- Music by: Masahiro Hiramoto
- Production company: Agung Inc.
- Distributed by: Broadmedia Studio
- Release date: July 2, 2016 (Japan)
- Running time: 75 minutes
- Country: Japan
- Language: Japanese

Setoutsumi (Japanese: セトウツミ; lit. Seto and Utsumi) is a 2016 Japanese drama film directed by Tatsushi Ōmori, and starring Sosuke Ikematsu and Masaki Suda. It is a live action film adaptation of the Japanese manga series of the same name written and illustrated by Kazuya Konomoto.

== Cast ==
- Sosuke Ikematsu as Utsumi
- Masaki Suda as Seto
- Ayami Nakajo as Ichigo Kashimura
- Takuji Suzuki
- Eiki Narita
- Amane Okayama
- Isao Okamura
- Kumi Kasa
- Motomi Makiguchi
- Shōhei Uno

== Production ==
The film was announced in April 2015 on volume 3 of the manga. Principal photography started in the fall of 2015.
