= RWBY: Ice Queendom =

Japanese anime television series

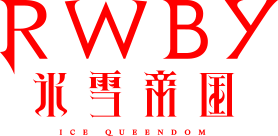
- 赤白黒黄: 氷雪帝国; Rubī: Hyōsetsu Teikoku
- Type: TV series
- Based on: RWBY
- Created by: Monty Oum (Note: Original creator (原作).); Rooster Teeth Productions; Gen Urobuchi (Note: Animation concept (アニメーション原案).); Huke (Note: Animation character concept (アニメーションキャラクター原案).)
- Directed by: Toshimasa Suzuki; Kenjirou Okada (Note: Chief director (チーフディレクター))
- Series composition: Tow Ubukata
- Screenplay by: Tow Ubukata
- Character designer: Nobuhiro Sugiyama
- Music by: Nobuko Toda; Kazuma Jinnouchi
- No. of episodes: (list of episodes)

Production
- Art director: Ken Naitou
- Sound director: Jin Aketagawa
- Cinematographer: Takayuki Aizu
- Color designer: Hitoshi Hibino
- CG directors: Tomohisa Shitara; Shinichirou Etou; Ryouta Maejima; Takaaki Kanno
- Editor: Rie Matsubara
- Animation producer: Yuuya Matsukawa
- Studio: Shaft
- Producers: Hideyuki Murata; Kaho Yamada; Maho Nishibe; Saki Okumura
- Production companies: Team RWBY Project: Bandai Namco Filmworks; Bandai Namco Music Live; Good Smile Company; Shaft; Warner Bros. Japan; Klab
- Runtime: 23 minutes

Original release
- Networks: Tokyo MX, BS11, MBS
- Release: July 3 – September 18, 2022

RWBY: Ice Queendom (Japanese: RWBY 氷雪帝国, Hepburn: Rubī: Hyōsetsu Teikoku; lit. "RWBY: Empire of Ice and Snow") is a Japanese anime television series produced by Shaft, based on the American web series RWBY created by Monty Oum for Rooster Teeth. The series aired from July to September 2022. A manga adaptation illustrated by Kumiko Suekane began serialization in ASCII Media Works's shōnen manga magazine Dengeki Daioh in June 2022.

== Voice cast ==
Character	Japanese	English
Ruby Rose	Saori Hayami	Lindsay Jones
Weiss Schnee	Yoko Hikasa	Kara Eberle; Elizabeth Maxwell (young)
Blake Belladonna	Yū Shimamura	Arryn Zech
Yang Xiao Long	Ami Koshimizu	Barbara Dunkelman
Jaune Arc	Hiro Shimono	Miles Luna
Nora Valkyrie	Aya Suzaki	Samantha Ireland
Pyrrha Nikos	Megumi Toyoguchi	Jen Brown
Lie Ren	Soma Saito	Neath Oum
Professor Ozpin	Kazuhiko Inoue	Shannon McCormick
Glynda Goodwitch	Masumi Asano	Tiana Camacho
Peter Port	Soichi Abe	Anthony Sardinha
Penny Polendina	Megumi Han	Taylor McNee
Sun Wukong	Tomoaki Maeno	Michael Jones
Taiyang Xiao Long	Kenyu Horiuchi	Burnie Burns
Roman Torchwick	Shin-ichiro Miki	Christopher Wehkamp
Shion Zaiden	Hiroki Nanami	Kdin Jenzen
Jacques Schnee	Madoka Shiga	Jason Douglas
Winter Schnee	Ayako Kawasumi	Elizabeth Maxwell
Whitley Schnee	Marina Inoue	Howard Wang
Klein Sieben	Ken Uo	J. Michael Tatum
Adam Taurus	Yuichi Nakamura	Garrett Hunter
Lisa Lavender	Arisa Sakuraba	Jen Brown
Nicholas Schnee	Ken Uo	John Swasey
Narrator/Salem	Kikuko Inoue	Jen Taylor

== Production and release ==
In February 2022, a website for a RWBY project, dubbed the "Team RWBY Project", was opened with future announcements listed to come. The following month, an anime series was announced on March 25, 2022. It is produced by Shaft and directed by Toshimasa Suzuki, with chief direction by Kenjirou Okada, visual director by Nobuyuki Takeuchi, animation concept by Gen Urobuchi, scripts written by Tow Ubukata, and music composed by Nobuko Toda and Kazuma Jinnouchi. Nobuhiro Sugiyama designed the characters for animation, based on character concepts by illustrator Huke. Sugiyama was the chief animation director alongside Hiroki Yamamura, Yoshiaki Itou, and Rina Iwamoto. Kana Miyai, Hiroto Nagata, and Kazuki Kawada (the latter both of Shaft) are the main animators. The series aired from July 3 to September 18, 2022, on Tokyo MX, BS11, and MBS, with Plus Media Networks Asia handled the Southeast Asia release for simulcast premiere on Aniplus Asia. The first three episodes were streamed on YouTube from June 24 to 26. The opening theme song is "Beyond Selves" by Void_Chords feat. L, while the ending theme song is "Awake" by Saori Hayami. Crunchyroll streamed the series along with an English dub. Billy Kametz was originally cast as Roman Torchwick in the English dub of the anime, but was later recast by Christopher Wehkamp after his 2022 hiatus and death. On March 24, voice actress Arryn Zech expressed discomfort with being involved in Ice Queendom upon being made aware of the 2015 domestic abuse allegations concerning series writer Tow Ubukata. This prompted Ubukata to tweet in response to Zech. Zech later tweeted again to confirm that she would be reprising her voice role of Blake Belladonna in the English dub of Ice Queendom, stating that she had internal discussions with the staff and that she would be donating her payment for her work to an undisclosed charity.

Pre-production on the series started a few years prior to the announcement of the project, with series writer Miles Luna, as well as other members of the RWBY production team, visited Good Smile Company and animation studios Shaft and Trigger as early as 2018. Original character designer Huke and animation concept writer Gen Urobuchi were initially contacted to conceptualize the project prior to the director and main writer. After Huke had created the concept designs for the series and Urobuchi had conceptualized the main narrative for the series, Suzuki was brought on board for the project; Suzuki's initial thoughts on Urobuchi's story was that it was "wonderful"; however, as Urobuchi wasn't on the project as the series' writer, Suzuki and members of the production team needed to find a separate writer to finalize Urobuchi's drafts. Ubukata was among the writers whom the team considered contacting, and since Suzuki had worked with Ubukata on Fafner in the Azure and Heroic Age, he was chosen as the series composition and screenplay writer. Urobuchi, Suzuki, and Ubukata were all present during script meetings for the series, and Ubukata (whose main role was to organize Urobuchi's concepts into a singular, coherent narrative) stated that he would add bits of his own creative ideas whenever he could while the latter half of the project had ideas escalated from its initial plans. Suzuki stated that he focused on visual directing, while he left the narrative elements to Ubukata.

Suzuki and Ubukata have commented that the cultural differences between Japanese and American productions was interesting due to different focuses from each respective culture in their narrative writing. For example, the themes of discrimination and racial prejudice were brought up between the two of them in reference to characters Weiss Schnee and Blake Belladona, the former of which holds racial prejudices and the latter of which is the victim of discrimination. As Japanese productions usually do not have a main character who is outright discriminated against, racial issues are usually not a big thematic subject. Ubukata referred to writing the series and consciously keeping the themes of racism and discrimination as a new experience for him.

In July 2022, the series was described as "continuity-adjacent" with the first three episodes pulling from RWBY Volume 1 and then launching into a new story set between the first and second volumes (seasons) of RWBY but diverting "off the core timeline". The series received a 12 episode order and will be released in Blu-Ray and DVD forms. The Blu-Ray and DVD release, dubbed the "Final Cut" (ファイナル・カット), was originally scheduled for release in January 2023, but was delayed to July 2023 to give the staff time to polish the animation and include new sequences, such as a newly animated opening. The "Final Cut" version also premiered on television in April 2023 as a special rebroadcast.

== Episodes ==
Dub trailer for RWBY: Ice Queendom

Only one episode was handled outside of Shaft, that being episode 6, which was produced at Yokohama Animation Laboratory. (Note: Yokohama Animation Lab credited as Production Assistance (制作協力) on the episode.)

No.	Title	Directed by (Note: Information is taken from the ending credits of each episode.)	Storyboarded by	Original release date
1	"Red, White, Black, Yellow"; Transliteration: "Shuttatsu" (Japanese: 出立)	Toshimasa Suzuki	Toshimasa Suzuki	July 3, 2022 (Japanese); September 25, 2022 (English) (Note: Episodes 1–3 had an advanced premiere stream on June 24, 2022, and episode 4 had an advance premiere at Anime Expo on July 3, 2022.)
Blake Belladonna helps Adam Taurus break into a Schnee Dust Company freight train for supplies, but becomes disillusioned with his callousness and the White Fang's present methods of achieving equality for the faunus, leaving the group to Adam's chagrin and enrolling at Beacon Academy for a fresh start. Weiss Schnee decides to prove her combat prowess to her father Jacques, to allow her to enroll at Beacon, instead of her native Atlas Academy, away from him and the shadow of her sister Winter, by defeating an armored Grimm. Weiss proves herself, receiving a scar in the process, and Jacques reluctantly lets her enroll in Beacon. Hearing that her older half-sister Yang Xiao Long has been accepted into Beacon, Ruby Rose decides to buy a gift for her, stopping a robbery led by notorious criminal Roman Torchwick on route, leading to her arrest by Glynda Goodwitch for illegal vigilantism. However, Professor Ozpin sees potential in Ruby, granting her permission to attend Beacon two years early.
2	"This Is Beacon"; Transliteration: "Shiken" (Japanese: 試験)	Shuuji Miyazaki	Kousuke Murayama	July 10, 2022 (Japanese); October 2, 2022 (English)
Ruby, Weiss, Blake and Yang all meet on the transport to Beacon, but the sisters get off on the wrong foot with the two. Ozpin reveals that they were partnered with whoever they see first after being dropped into a Grimm infested forest as part of the initiation to find a relic. Ruby and Weiss end up becoming partners much to the latter's dismay, and Blake and Yang quickly become partners. After finding and choosing a relic, everyone is suddenly attacked by a Nevermore and a Death Stalker. Ruby, Weiss, Blake and Yang deal with the Nevermore, while Jaune, Nora, Pyrrha and Ren deal with the Death Stalker. Due to them coming up with a plan in the heat of the moment and successfully completing their initiations, Ruby and Jaune are named team leaders and Teams RWBY and JNPR are officially formed. Unbeknownst to the teams during the test, the negative emotions of Weiss and Jaune Arc have attracted a "Nightmare," a type of Grimm that feeds off of those with powerful Auras, and unstable emotions.
3	"A Nightmare Comes"; Transliteration: "Akumu" (Japanese: 悪夢)	Kenjirou Okada	Nobuyuki Takeuchi	July 17, 2022 (Japanese); October 9, 2022 (English)
This episode picks up where the last episode left off as Weiss is put to the test by Professor Port against a Grimm, and questions Ruby's leadership. After losing a duel and being taught about aura from Pyrrha, Jaune is possessed by the Nightmare, and Shion Zaiden, a non-binary, specialized Nightmare hunter, uses their tools and Semblance to assist the remaining members of Team JNPR to enter Jaune's Dream and expel the Nightmare, at which they are successful. Afterwards, Penny is introduced, and Team RWBY learns that Blake is a Faunus and a former member of the White Fang. Due to this revelation, there are tensions between Weiss and Blake that quickly heated up, leading to Blake running away. While hiding from her teammates, Blake bumps into Sun, who is a monkey Faunus, and tells him exactly why she left the White Fang. Right after the battle against Roman Torchwick and the White Fang, Weiss feels that she has moved on from her past self and has made better connections with her friends. However, it is revealed that she has actually been possessed by a Nightmare in the same manner as Jaune, and it manifests and drags Weiss deep into her subconscious.
4	"Ice Queendom"; Transliteration: "Hyōsetsu Teikoku" (Japanese: 氷雪帝国)	Shouhei Fujita	Midori Yoshizawa	July 24, 2022 (Japanese); October 16, 2022 (English)
The unconscious Weiss is put under Shion's care as they attempt to expel the Nightmare. Ruby volunteers to enter Weiss's dream. In the dream world, she infiltrates a large city being patrolled by robots. Her snooping around catches the attention of the nightmare version of Weiss, who acts hostile towards Ruby.
5	"Awaken in a Dream"; Transliteration: "Nemuri no Miyako" (Japanese: 眠りの都)	Naoaki Shibuta	Kenjirou Okada	July 31, 2022 (Japanese); October 23, 2022 (English)
Ruby attempts to battle the nightmare Weiss, but is overwhelmed by her power and is ejected from the dream. Ruby decides to enter again, this time with Blake and Yang joining her. Together, they find a red knight chess piece relic, which they surmise could be key in rescuing Weiss. They confront the Nightmare version of Weiss, dubbed "Negative Weiss" (shortened as "Nega Weiss").
6	"Do You Have a Plan?"; Transliteration: "Sakusen wa?" (Japanese: 作戦は?)	Yukihiro Miyamoto	Yuki Yase	August 7, 2022 (Japanese); October 30, 2022 (English)
Blake stays behind to distract and battle Nega Weiss, while Ruby and Yang go on ahead. With the red relic, they enter the place the Nightmare Grimm is residing, however they are accosted by Nega Weiss. A battle ensues in which the red relic is destroyed and Ruby's hand is wounded by one of the Nightmare's vines. The three are ejected from the dream, with Ruby's hand wounded in the real world as well. Trying to come up with a new plan, Ruby, Blake and Yang take some advice from Team JNPR, Sun, and Penny, respectively. The three share their ideas and re-enter the dream once more, this time with Jaune joining due to his experience of being affected by a Nightmare beforehand. Shion warns the team that this could be their last chance to save Weiss as the Nightmare's roots have further spread through her body, and Shion's Aura would not regenerate in time to make another attempt before Weiss is killed.
7	"Dreams Come Rued"; Transliteration: "Jiyū no Tame Ni" (Japanese: 自由のために)	Tsutomu Murakami	Kousuke Murayama	August 14, 2022 (Japanese); November 6, 2022 (English)
Ruby, Blake, Yang, and Jaune infiltrate the dream world Schnee Empire once more. Jaune is able to sneak around undetected. With the unexpected help of dream versions of Team JNPR, he locates the yellow relic, inadvertently freeing many child versions of Weiss doppelgangers. They run amok in the city, spreading their childish charm to the residents of the Empire. With the battle turning chaotic, Nega Weiss steps in and unleashes the tyrannical being known as "Big Nicholas".
8	"Where You Belong"; Transliteration: "Hiran" (Japanese: 氷嵐)	Kenjirou Okada	Kei Ajiki	August 21, 2022 (Japanese); November 13, 2022 (English)
Team RWBY use the chaos to enter the Nightmare's domain again. Nega Weiss contains the battle with Big Nicholas and sends Yang and Blake outside of the Empire, where they come across a dilapidated building. The Nightmare's vines spread throughout the city, trapping dream versions of Ren, Nora, and a few of the child Weiss's, while also pricking Ruby's left hand. Jaune manages to escape with dream Pyrrha and few more child Weiss's and they take refuge in the train, which the Nightmare cannot touch due to a giant sword Jaune had obtained when entering the dream initially. Ruby loses the yellow relic and regroups with Jaune and the others. Feeling as though she had failed, Ruby falls victim to the Nightmare due to the wound on her hand. The Nightmare destroys the white relic that was in Nega Weiss's possession.
9	"My Dream, Your Dream"; Transliteration: "Anata no Tame Ni" (Japanese: あなたのために)	Shuuji Miyazaki	Shuuji Miyazaki	August 28, 2022 (Japanese); November 20, 2022 (English)
Jaune manages to cure Ruby of the Nightmare, and their group uses the train to charge straight to the Nightmare. At the dilapidated building, Blake and Yang find the black relic which releases the dream versions of the White Fang. Ruby attempts to charge through the Empire's forces, but is stopped by Nega Weiss once again. Suddenly, the White Fang arrive to do battle with the robots, and Blake suddenly appears donning similar attire to Adam. Yang regroups with Jaune and the others.
10	"Mirror of Darkness"; Transliteration: "Shirayuki Kurohomura" (Japanese: 白雪黒炎)	Naoaki Shibuta; Shouhei Fujita	Kousuke Murayama; Shouhei Fujita; Osamu Sumiya	September 4, 2022 (Japanese); November 27, 2022 (English)
Blake comes up with a plan to let herself be possessed by Jaune's Nightmare, which transforms her into Nega Blake. She proceeds to battle Nega Weiss and the two are evenly matched. Yang, Jaune and their group fight off Big Nicholas and the Empire's forces. Ruby is given the black relic and confronts the Nightmare once more.
11	"Light in Shadows"; Transliteration: "Mukiau Mono" (Japanese: 向き合う者)	Yukihiro Miyamoto	Toshimasa Suzuki	September 11, 2022 (Japanese); December 4, 2022 (English)
Nega Blake overwhelms Nega Weiss long enough to sever her connection to the Nightmare, and Ruby is able to defeat it, unknowingly using her Silver Eyes in the process. Back in the real world, Shion manages to extract the Nightmare from Weiss, reverting her personality in the dream world back to normal. With Yang's help, Blake takes control of herself again from her Negative counterpart. Team RWBY then work together to bring down the other Nightmare, and Shion extracts it from Blake. Team RWBY and Jaune exit the dream and wake up in the real world, though Weiss is strongly embarrassed by the incident.
12	"Best Day Ever"; Transliteration: "Saikō no Tsuitachi" (Japanese: 最高の一日)	Naoaki Shibuta; Kenjirou Okada	Naoaki Shibuta; Midori Yoshizawa	September 18, 2022 (Japanese); December 11, 2022 (English)
Life at Beacon returns to normal, and Team RWBY begin to bond more. With the Nightmare Grimm threat neutralized, Shion announces they will travel around Remnant to hunt down more Nightmares. Weiss and Blake make amends and promise to support each other as well as better support Ruby as their leader. On the last day before the new semester begins, Teams RWBY and JNPR engage in a food fight against each other, similar to what happens in the first episode of Volume 2 in the original RWBY web series.

- RWBY: Ice Queendom
- Manga
- Written by: Team RWBY Project
- Illustrated by: Kumiko Suekane
- Published by: ASCII Media Works
- Magazine: Dengeki Daioh
- Original run: June 27, 2022 – November 27, 2023
- Volumes: 3

== Other media ==
=== Manga ===
A manga adaptation illustrated by Kumiko Suekane began serialization in ASCII Media Works's Dengeki Daioh magazine on June 27, 2022. The first tankōbon volume was released on September 9, 2022. Three volumes were published.

No.	Japanese release date	Japanese ISBN
1	September 9, 2022	978-4-04-914616-5
2	May 26, 2023	978-4-04-915058-2
3	December 26, 2023	978-4-04-915451-1

== Reception ==
Writing for Anime News Network, Richard Eisenbeis stated that "the way these three episodes mix the old and new is perfect for keeping things interesting in the long run," (Note: The series' home video release was delayed from January 2023 to July 2023 in order to polish the animation further and add an original animated opening absent from the TV broadcast.) and "the way the tiny alterations and omissions subtly change our heroes (especially Jaune) was endlessly fascinating to me". Matthew Magnus Lundeen of Gamerant called the series "special" while re-doing scenes from early Volume 1 episodes of RWBY, praised the art design as an improvement over its source material, and said the series has the potential to be "the best in the franchise" and stated that "RWBY: Ice Queendom gets off to a cool start". Writing for Anime Feminist, Meru Clewis praised the visuals, soundtrack, and "the amount of passion poured into RWBY's entire world", noting that "RWBY reach a new peak of success." But added: "If you're new to the franchise as a whole, this might be a lot to take in." Clewis also praised the inclusion of new character Shion Zaiden as a positive addition of non-binary gender representation.
