= I Was Exiled as a Villainess! =

Japanese web novel series

- I Was Exiled as a Villainess! I Am Now a Sister Living the Good Life Through a Culinary Reform
- First light novel volume cover

悪役令嬢の追放後！ 教会改革ごはんで悠々シスター暮らし (Akuyaku Reijō no Tsuihōgo! Kyōkai Kaikaku Gohan de Yūyū Shisutā-gurashi)
- Genre: Fantasy, isekai
- Novel series
- Written by: Tail Yuzuhara
- Published by: Shōsetsuka ni Narō
- Original run: September 1, 2018 – May 2, 2020
- Manga
- Written by: Tail Yuzuhara
- Illustrated by: Tsumuji Yoshimura
- Published by: Kadokawa Shoten
- English publisher: NA: Kadokawa
- Imprint: Flos Comic
- Magazine: ComicWalker
- Original run: December 3, 2018 – July 17, 2024
- Volumes: 11
- Light novel
- Written by: Tail Yuzuhara
- Illustrated by: Yū Shiroya
- Published by: ASCII Media Works
- Original run: March 5, 2019 – September 5, 2019
- Volumes: 2
- Anime
- icon

I Was Exiled as a Villainess! I Am Now a Sister Living the Good Life Through a Culinary Reform (Japanese: 悪役令嬢の追放後！ 教会改革ごはんで悠々シスター暮らし, Hepburn: Akuyaku Reijō no Tsuihōgo! Kyōkai Kaikaku Gohan de Yūyū Shisutā-gurashi; lit. 'After the Villainess' Exile! Living Quietly as a Nun Reforming with Church Meals') is a Japanese web novel series written by Tail Yuzuhara. It was serialized online from September 2018 to May 2020 on the user-generated novel publishing website Shōsetsuka ni Narō. A manga adaptation with art by Tsumuji Yoshimura was serialized online via Kadokawa Corporation's ComicWalker manga website from December 2018 to July 2024 and was collected in eleven tankōbon volumes. A light novel version with illustrations by Yū Shiroya and character designs by Yoshimura was published in two volumes by ASCII Media Works from March to September 2019. An anime adaptation has been announced.

== Premise ==
Since she was a child, Elizabeth has recalled memories from her previous life: a modern Japanese woman who had played an otome game where Elizabeth is the "villainess" character exiled during the game's ending. Unfortunately, things go wrong despite her efforts. The heroine is a bumbling idiot who constantly calls out her name whenever she trips and has accidents; even just avoiding her made Elizabeth look bad.

As a result of this unconfirmed evidence she was exiled by the prince and had her assets liquidated to fund the church. Despite this setback, Elizabeth is elated yo be finally free and live her life free from noble obligations. Elizabeth wants to live a peaceful life in the rural church, but the knight commander Leonid suddenly takes an interest in her.

== Characters ==
Elizabeth
Though innocent of any bullying, Elizabeth was falsely blamed and disproportionately exiled; though she is enjoying her new life away from noble society. An event planner in her last life, Elizabeth helps the church with moneymaking ideas for funds. Unfortunately she keeps running into capture targets long after the heroine and prince got married; seemingly beig toyed with by the world.
She is later exonerated and given a much overdue apology. Even being offered the chance to leave the church and return home.
Leonid

The knight commander with an obsessive crush on Elizabeth. Because he's quite unintelligent, Leonid can't explain himself properly not convey his feelings to her; coming off as a creepy stalker paranoid she wants revenge for her exile.

== Media ==
=== Web novel ===
Written by Tail Yuzuhara, I Was Exiled as a Villainess! I Am Now a Sister Living the Good Life Through a Culinary Reform was serialized as a web novel on the Shōsetsuka ni Narō website from September 1, 2018, to May 2, 2020.

=== Manga ===
A manga adaptation illustrated by Tsumuji Yoshimura was serialized on Kadokawa Corporation's ComicWalker manga website from December 3, 2018, to July 17, 2024. The manga's chapters were compiled into eleven tankōbon volumes released from March 5, 2019, to August 5, 2024. The manga adaptation is published in English on Kadokawa's BookWalker website.

No.	Release date	ISBN
1	March 5, 2019	978-4-04-065431-7
2	September 5, 2019	978-4-04-064054-9
3	May 2, 2020	978-4-04-064577-3
4	December 4, 2020	978-4-04-065989-3
5	July 5, 2021	978-4-04-680587-4
6	February 4, 2022	978-4-04-681068-7
7	August 5, 2022	978-4-04-681673-3
8	February 3, 2023	978-4-04-682189-8
9	August 4, 2023	978-4-04-682629-9
10	February 5, 2024	978-4-04-683247-4
11	August 5, 2024	978-4-04-683904-6

=== Light novel ===
A light novel version with illustrations by Yū Shiroya and character designs by Yoshimura was published in two volumes by ASCII Media Works from March 5 to September 5, 2019.

No.	Release date	ISBN
1	March 5, 2019	978-4-04-912306-7
2	September 5, 2019	978-4-04-912769-0

=== Anime ===
An anime adaptation was announced on August 4, 2025.

== See also ==
- The Gender of Mona Lisa, another manga series illustrated by Tsumuji Yoshimura
