= Gekijōban Zero =

- Theatrical release poster
- Directed by: Mari Asato
- Written by: Mari Asato
- Based on: Fatal Frame by: Koei Tecmo; Fatal Frame: A Curse Affecting Only Girls; by Eiji Ōtsuka
- Produced by: Tsuyoshi Kobayashi; Reiko Imayasu
- Starring: Ayami Nakajō; Aoi Morikawa; Fujiko Kojima; Karen Miyama; Kasumi Yamaya
- Cinematography: Yuta Tsukinaga
- Edited by: Masaki Murakami
- Music by: Yusuke Hayashi
- Production companies: Kadokawa Daiei Studio; Dentsu; Happinet; Hikari TV; Avex Music Creative; Koei Tecmo Games
- Distributed by: Kadokawa Corporation
- Release date: 26 September 2014 (Japan)
- Running time: 105 minutes
- Country: Japan
- Language: Japanese
- Box office: ¥120 million

Gekijōban Zero (Japanese: 劇場版 零(ゼロ); lit. Zero: The Movie), also known as Fatal Frame: The Movie, is a 2014 Japanese horror film directed by Mari Asato and starring Ayami Nakajō and Aoi Morikawa. It is based on a spin-off novel of the Fatal Frame video game series, titled Fatal Frame: A Curse Affecting Only Girls, (Note: Japanese: 零(ゼロ) 女の子だけがかかる呪い) written by Eiji Ōtsuka. It was released on 26 September 2014.

Gekijōban Zero premiered in North America on July 28, 2015, at the 19th Fantasia International Film Festival.

== Plot ==
Aya, the most popular student of a Catholic all-girls school, suddenly shuts herself in her room. Her admirer, Kasumi Nohara, kisses her photo at midnight and suddenly disappears with her friend Michi as a witness. Her disappearance is quickly attributed to a supposed curse that affects girls who kiss the photo of the person they admire at midnight. Aya's photo is taken to the attic by Sakuya Itsuki and Risa for safekeeping, but the two alongside three other girls are enticed to kiss the photo. Except for Risa, who is later found dazed but alive, all of them are eventually found dead at a nearby river.

When Michi attempts to kiss the photo, Aya stops her and reveals that she is not responsible for the curse, as the photo is not hers. They search help in Kazumi "Mary" Kusanagi, an eccentric photographer, who keeps photos inside her studio of lesbian girls who made a suicide pact by drowning themselves at a lake, which is now closed, due to society's intolerance towards same-sex couples. She also tells a story about a couple who was doomed when one of them refused to commit suicide, causing her to be haunted by her lover for the rest of her life. Aya then admits to Michi that she is haunted by the guilt of letting a fellow orphan of hers die in front of her.

Michi decides to kiss the photo to put herself into the curse and chains herself to Aya so the latter can save her should she be in danger. However, the two are separated halfway through and Aya is knocked out by Takashi, the mentally handicapped brother of the school nun, Mayumi Aso. She is thrown into a reservoir located at the place where the lesbian couples committed their suicides. There, Aya remembers that the doppelgänger is in fact her twin sister, Maya. Though she died at an early age, Maya "grew up" alongside Aya and put a curse at the photo until Aya could find her in the reservoir. Meanwhile, Michi is about to be drowned by Mayumi, who is revealed to be the one murdering the girls so as to keep Takashi's supposed involvement in Maya's death a secret, but she chooses to drown herself with Takashi when the authorities are closing in. Michi goes to the reservoir and reunites with Aya.

Aya and Michi participate in the school choir celebrating their graduation. Meanwhile, Mary visits the school's headmistress and abbess, correctly deducing her as the lesbian girl who was haunted by the spirit of her lover. The headmistress reveals that to keep her lover from bothering her, she murdered Maya so the latter could accompany her, though she is distressed when the act led to more murders by Mayumi, although her brother had nothing to do with it. After the choir, Michi bids Aya goodbye before she departs for Tokyo to attend a photography college. She is about to take a photo of her, but pulls up at the last second and makes Aya promise to wait for her until she has become a proper photographer.

== Cast and characters ==
- Ayami Nakajō as Aya Tsukimori
- Aoi Morikawa as Michi Kazato
- Fujiko Kojima as Risa
- Karen Miyama as Sakuya Itsuki
- Kasumi Yamaya as Kasumi Nohara
- Minori Hagiwara as Waka Fujii
- Yuri Nakamura as Mayumi Aso
- Kōdai Asaka as Takashi Aso
- Noriko Nakagoshi as Kazumi "Mary" Kusanagi
- Jun Miho as Headmistress

== Reception ==
The film grossed ¥120 million ($1,132,666) at the Japanese box office. In South Korea, the film opened with ₩213 million ($190,000), and eventually grossed ₩277,244,253 ($245,098) at the box office. Combined, the film grossed $1.4 million in East Asia.

Richard Eisenbeis from Kotaku gave the film a positive review. He commented that the best aspect of the movie is the way in which it is told. Rather than focusing solely on Michi, the movie constantly shown the story through many viewpoints other than her own, which intertwining with each other and slowly expose the truth behind the mystery in the film. He found it interesting that a large portion of the story revolves around being a lesbian in Japan not only during the modern era, but also at Meiji era. He also noted that the movie's "intensely creepy and atmospheric" tone are what builds the fear, a feat many horror films could not hope to accomplish. Conversely, he has a mixed review for the lack of ghost killing via camera in the film, which is supposed to be one of pivotal elements in the game franchise. Nevertheless, he noted that the movie is a film very much worthy of the Fatal Frame name, and stated that "if you are a fan of Fatal Frame or Japanese horror in general, this is most certainly a film to watch".

== See also ==
- List of films based on video games
