= The Gender of Mona Lisa =

Japanese manga series

- First tankōbon volume cover

性別「モナリザ」の君へ。 (Seibetsu "Mona Lisa" no Kimi e)
- Genre: Coming-of-age, romance
- Manga
- Written by: Tsumuji Yoshimura
- Published by: Square Enix
- English publisher: NA: Comikey (digital); Square Enix
- Imprint: Gangan Comics Online
- Magazine: Gangan Online
- Original run: May 14, 2018 – October 3, 2022
- Volumes: 10
- Anime television series
- Directed by: Kana Shundo; Kouji Matsumura (Note: Assistant Director (副監督). See the Shaft director credits legend.)
- Written by: Katsuhiko Takayama
- Music by: Yuki Hayashi
- Studio: Shaft
- Original run: 2027 – scheduled
- icon

The Gender of Mona Lisa (Japanese: 性別「モナリザ」の君へ。, Hepburn: Seibetsu "Mona Lisa" no Kimi e), also known as Just Like Mona Lisa, is a Japanese manga series written and illustrated by Tsumuji Yoshimura. It was serialized on Square Enix's Gangan Online manga website from May 2018 to October 2022. An anime television series adaptation produced by Shaft is set to premiere in 2027.

== Plot ==
The story is set in a world where people do not have a biological sex until they are twelve years old, upon which they will begin male or female puberty depending on their preference. Hinase, an eighteen-year-old who remains genderless, receives confessions of love from both of their childhood friends: Shiori and Ritsu, a boy and a girl respectively.

== Characters ==
Hinase Arima (有馬 ひなせ, Arima Hinase)
Voiced by: Chika Anzai
Shiori Takayama (高山 しおり, Takayama Shiori)
Ritsu Kaga (加賀 りつ, Kaga Ritsu)
Aoi Shirogane (白銀 あおい, Shirogane Aoi)
Chiaki Kurokawa (黒川 ちあき, Kurokawa Chiaki)
Tamaki Beppu (別府 たまき, Beppu Tamaki)
Rui Kinosaki (城崎 るい, Kinosaki Rui)
Mahiro Goshiki (五色 まひろ, Goshiki Mahiro)

== Media ==
=== Manga ===
Written and illustrated by Tsumuji Yoshimura, The Gender of Mona Lisa was serialized on Square Enix's Gangan Online manga website from May 14, 2018, to October 3, 2022. The series' chapters were compiled into ten tankōbon volumes from September 21, 2018, to December 12, 2022.

The series is published in English by Comikey and Square Enix through their Manga UP! Global app. During their Anime Expo 2023 panel, Square Enix Manga & Books announced that they would begin publishing the series under the title Just Like Mona Lisa in July 2024.

No.	Original release date	Original ISBN	North American release date	North American ISBN
1	September 21, 2018	978-4-7575-5848-9	July 16, 2024	978-1-64609-277-2
2	February 22, 2019	978-4-7575-6013-0	September 17, 2024	978-1-64609-278-9
3	August 9, 2019	978-4-7575-6238-7	November 19, 2024	978-1-64609-279-6
4	February 12, 2020	978-4-7575-6504-3	January 14, 2025	978-1-64609-280-2
5	August 11, 2020	978-4-7575-6782-5; 978-4-7575-6783-2 (SE)	May 13, 2025	978-1-64609-331-1
6	March 12, 2021	978-4-7575-7156-3	July 8, 2025	978-1-64609-332-8
7	October 12, 2021	978-4-7575-7529-5	September 2, 2025	978-1-64609-333-5
8	April 12, 2022	978-4-7575-7882-1	March 24, 2026	978-1-64609-334-2
9	December 12, 2022	978-4-7575-8308-5	May 19, 2026	978-1-64609-335-9
10	December 12, 2022	978-4-7575-8309-2	May 19, 2026	978-1-64609-336-6

=== Anime ===
An anime television series adaptation was announced on June 17, 2026. Produced by CyberAgent and animated by Shaft, it will be directed by Kana Shundo, with series composition and screenplays handled by Katsuhiko Takayama, characters designed by Nobuhiro Sugiyama, who will also serve as chief animation director, and music composed by Yuki Hayashi. The series is set to premiere in 2027. The ending theme song is "Mayoi wa Hikari" (迷いは光; 'The Illusion Is Light'), performed by imase.

== Reception ==
The series was nominated for the sixth Next Manga Awards in the web category and was ranked 20th out of 50 nominees.

== See also ==
- I Was Exiled as a Villainess!, a web novel series whose manga adaptation is illustrated by Tsumuji Yoshimura
