= Nisekoi (film) =

Nisekoi: False Love
- Theatrical release poster
- Kanji: ニセコイ
- Revised Hepburn: Nisekoi
- Directed by: Hayato Kawai
- Written by: Shota Koyama; Noriaki Sugihara
- Based on: Nisekoi by Naoshi Komi
- Produced by: Tamako Tsujimoto
- Starring: Kento Nakajima; Ayami Nakajo; Natsumi Ikema; Haruka Shimazaki; Kaede Aono; Yūta Kishi
- Cinematography: Shinya Kimura
- Edited by: Honosuke Hagaki
- Music by: Yu Takami
- Production companies: FINE Entertainment; Toho Pictures
- Distributed by: Toho
- Release date: December 21, 2018
- Running time: 118 minutes
- Country: Japan
- Language: Japanese

Nisekoi: False Love (Japanese: ニセコイ, Hepburn: Nisekoi) is a 2018 Japanese romantic comedy-drama film and the live-action adaptation of a manga series of the same name by Naoshi Komi. It is directed by Hayato Kawai, distributed by Toho, and stars Kento Nakajima and Ayami Nakajo as Raku Ichijo and Chitoge Kirisaki respectively. It was released in Japan on December 21, 2018. The theme song of the film, KawaE by Yabai T-shirts Yasan. This Live-action movie was released across 294 theaters in Japan.

== Plot ==
Raku Ichijo is in high school. He does not like violence and is studying to fulfil his aspiration to serve the public. Chitoge Kirisaki is a transfer student and new to the school. She accidentally knocks Raku down. Normally, that would be that; except each is respectively the son and daughter of local Yakuza gang members. There is going to be trouble unless they act as if they are going steady. It is not going to be easy because they dislike one another.

== Cast ==
- Kento Nakajima as Raku Ichijo
- Ayami Nakajo as Chitoge Kirisaki
- Natsumi Ikema as Kosaki Onodera
- Haruka Shimazaki as Marika Tachibana
- Kaede Aono as Seshirō Tsugumi
- Yūta Kishi as Shū Maiko: Raku's best friend.
- Hana Kawamura as Ruri Miyamoto: Kosaki's best friend.
- DAIGO as Claude: Chitoge's bodyguard.
- Marika Matsumoto as Kyoko Hihara: The homeroom teacher of Raku's classroom.
