= Ayami Nakajo =

Japanese model and actress (born 1997)

- 中条 あやみ
- Born: Pauline Ayami Steward; February 4, 1997 (age 29); Abeno-ku, Osaka, Japan
- Other names: Pauline Ayami Nakajo (中条あやみポーリン); Pauline Steward (ポーリン・スチュワード)
- Occupations: Model; actress
- Years active: 2011–present
- Agent: Ten Carat
- Known for: Nurse in Action!; Fatal Frame: The Movie; Seto & Utsumi; Let's Go, Jets!; Anonymous Noise; Real Girl; Nisekoi: False Love; Snow Flower
- Height: 1.69 m (5 ft 6 1/2 in)
- Spouse: Sogo Ichihara (m. 2023)

Ayami Nakajo (中条 あやみ, Nakajō Ayami; born February 4, 1997) is a Japanese actress and model who is affiliated with Ten Carat.

== Biography ==
=== Early life ===
Nakajō was born in Abeno-ku, Osaka in 1997. Her mother is Japanese and her father is British. She has an older sister twelve years her senior.

She played badminton during high school as a junior.

== Career ==
=== Modelling ===
In 2011, she auditioned for the female fashion magazine Seventeen. She was selected in the Grand Prix with models such as Yua Shinkawa.

In 2012, Nakajō first participated as a model in Tokyo Girls Collection in the 2012S/S season.

In September 2017, Nakajō officially became an exclusive model for CanCam.

=== Acting ===
In 2012, Nakajō debuted in the television drama, Miss Double Faced Teacher, as Yuyaku Umehara.

In 2014, her first starring role in a film was Fatal Frame: The Movie.

== Personal life ==
On May 1, 2023, she announced her marriage with Sogo Ichihara, the president of a company specializing in digital marketing.

== Filmography ==
=== TV series ===
Year	Title	Role	Other notes	Ref.
2012	Miss Double Faced Teacher	Yuu Umehara		
2013	Summer Nude	Mami Ichise		
2015	True Horror Stories: Summer 2015	Lida Mami	Lead role	
2015	She	Azusa Ogiwara		
2016	Stranger	Maria	TV movie	
2017	Tales of the Unusual: Spring 2017	Midori	Lead role; short drama	
2019	The Devil's Ballad	Ōzora Yukari	TV movie	
2019	Nurse in Action!	Haruka Tachibana	Lead role	
2020	56-nenme no Shitsuren	Nakagawa Saori	Lead role; television film	
2020	I Had a Dream of That Girl	Herself	Episode 1	
2020	The Mystery Collection of Enmadou Sara	Enma Sara	Lead role	
2021	Tokyo MER: Mobile Emergency Room	Hina Tsurumaki		
2021–23	Love You as the World Ends	Kurumi Ogasawara	4 seasons	

=== Films ===
Year	Title	Role	Other notes	Ref.
2014	Fatal Frame: The Movie	Aya Tsukimori	Lead role	
2016	Lychee Light Club	Kanon		
2016	Seto & Utsumi	Ichigo Kashimura		
2017	Anonymous Noise	Nino Arisugawa	Lead role	
2017	Let's Go, Jets!	Ayano Tamaki		
2018	Real Girl	Iroha Igarashi	Lead role	
2018	Nisekoi: False Love	Chitoge Kirisaki	Lead role	
2019	Snow Flower	Miyuki	Lead role	
2019	How To Identify The Right Bus	Sameshima	Lead role; filmed in 2015	
2020	Flight on the Water	Haruka Todo	Lead role	
2023	Tokyo MER: Mobile Emergency Room – The Movie	Hina Tsurumaki		
2024	In an Isolated Cottage on a Snowy Mountain	Takako Nakanishi		
2024	Amalock	Saki		
2025	#Iwilltellyouthetruth	The owner of a yoga studio		
2025	Strawberry Moon	Urara Takatō (adult)		
2025	Tokyo MER: Mobile Emergency Room – Nankai Mission	Hina Tsurumaki		
2026	Tokyo MER: Mobile Emergency Room – Capital Crisis	Hina Tsurumaki		

== Awards and nominations ==
Year	Award	Category	Work	Result	Ref.
2011	Miss Seventeen Grand Prix			Won	
2017	71st Mainichi Film Awards	Best New Actress	Setoutsumi	Won	
2017	28th Japan Best Jewellery Wearer	Best Dressed		Won	
2018	41st Japan Academy Film Prize	Newcomer of the Year	Let's Go, Jets!	Won	
