= Nisekoi =

Japanese manga and anime series

- Nisekoi: False Love
- First tankōbon volume cover, featuring (from left to right) Kosaki Onodera, Raku Ichijo, and Chitoge Kirisaki

ニセコイ
- Genre: Harem; Romantic comedy
- Manga
- Written by: Naoshi Komi
- Published by: Shueisha
- English publisher: NA: Viz Media
- Imprint: Jump Comics
- Magazine: Weekly Shōnen Jump
- English magazine: NA: Weekly Shonen Jump
- Original run: November 7, 2011 – August 8, 2016
- Volumes: 25
- Novel series

Nisekoi: Urabana
- Written by: Hajime Tanaka
- Illustrated by: Naoshi Komi
- Published by: Shueisha
- Imprint: Jump J-Books
- Original run: June 4, 2013 – April 3, 2015
- Volumes: 3
- Anime television series
- Directed by: Akiyuki Shinbo (chief); Naoyuki Tatsuwa
- Produced by: Atsuhiro Iwakami; Mitsutoshi Kubota; Hirō Maruyama; Hiroyuki Kiyōno
- Written by: Akiyuki Shinbo; Shaft (Note: Credited under the collective pen name Fuyashi Tō.)
- Music by: Kakeru Ishihama (1–6); Naoki "naotyu" Chiba (1–6); Tomoki Kikuya (7–20)
- Studio: Shaft
- Licensed by: AUS: Madman Entertainment; NA: Aniplex of America; UK: Kazé UK
- Original network: MBS, Tokyo MX, GTV, GYT, tvk, CTC, TV Saitama, TV Aichi, TVQ, TVh, BS11
- English network: SEA: Aniplus Asia, Animax Asia
- Original run: January 11, 2014 – May 24, 2014
- Episodes: 20 + 3 OVAs
- Video game

Nisekoi: Yomeiri!?
- Developer: Konami
- Publisher: Konami
- Platform: PlayStation Vita
- Released: JP: November 27, 2014
- Anime television series

Nisekoi:
- Directed by: Akiyuki Shinbo (chief); Yukihiro Miyamoto (chief)
- Produced by: Kazumasa Sanjōba; Ryū Hashimoto; Miku Ōshima; Akiko Yodo
- Written by: Akiyuki Shinbo; Shaft
- Music by: Tomoki Kikuya
- Studio: Shaft
- Licensed by: AUS: Madman Entertainment; NA: Aniplex of America; UK: Kazé UK
- Original network: MBS, Tokyo MX, BS11
- English network: SEA: Animax Asia
- Original run: April 10, 2015 – June 26, 2015
- Episodes: 12 + 1 OVA
- Live-action film
- Nisekoi (2018)
- icon

Nisekoi: False Love (Japanese: ニセコイ, Hepburn: Nisekoi; lit. 'Fake Love') is a Japanese manga series written and illustrated by Naoshi Komi. Nisekoi was first published as a one-shot manga in Shueisha's seasonal Jump Next! magazine before being serialized in the shōnen manga magazine Weekly Shōnen Jump from November 2011 to August 2016, with its chapters collected in 25 tankōbon volumes. Nisekoi was published in English in Viz Media's digital magazine, Weekly Shonen Jump and was also released by the publisher in English in digital and print volumes. A three-volume novel series, titled Nisekoi: Urabana, written by Hajime Tanaka, was released from June 2013 to April 2015.

A 20-episode anime television series produced by Shaft was broadcast from January to May 2014. A 12-episode second season, titled Nisekoi:, was broadcast from April to June 2015. Aniplex of America has licensed the series for streaming and home video distribution in North America. A live-action film adaptation premiered in December 2018.

== Plot ==
Nisekoi follows high school students Raku Ichijo, the son of a leader in the Yakuza faction Shuei-gumi, and Chitoge Kirisaki, the daughter of a boss in a rival gang known as Beehive. They unexpectedly meet when Chitoge hops a wall and kicks Raku in the face. After she runs off, Raku realizes he has lost his locket which was given to him by his childhood sweetheart with whom he made a secret promise. After discovering Chitoge is a new transfer student in his class, he forces her to help him look for the locket. During the search, they begin to despise each other with a passion.

Upon returning home, Raku learns that the Shuei-gumi and Beehive gangs have agreed to settle their feud by pairing their leaders' children. Much to his horror, he learns that his girlfriend-to-be is only Chitoge. For the next three years, they must pretend to be in a relationship to maintain peace between the gangs. This turns out to be quite a challenging task, not only because of their hatred for one another, but also because Raku has a crush on another schoolmate, Kosaki Onodera, whom he secretly wishes was the girl who bears the key to his locket. Unbeknownst to him, Kosaki carries her own deep secret crush on Raku. The two do their best in their attempts to keep up their facade, while many developments complicate the situation, such as Chitoge's over-protective bodyguard, Claude, scheming to expose their relationship as fake.

During the school years new characters and developments arise to cause more trouble for Raku. Chitoge's childhood friend and Beehive hitman, Tsugumi Seishiro, joins the class, initially as an obstacle for Raku, before becoming a friend in the group, reluctantly accepting the relationship while unknowingly developing a crush on Raku herself. Marika Tachibana, daughter of the police captain, transfers in and declares herself as Raku's fiancée, having developed a crush on him for over ten years. Haru Onodera – Kosaki's younger sister – initially attempted to sabotage Raku's attempts to get closer with her sister, before eventually developing her own feelings for him. Yui Kanakura – the newly-appointed head of the Char Siu Mafia and Raku's childhood friend – later becomes the class' new teacher, herself also being in love with him.

Over the course of the story many revelations and discoveries are uncovered regarding the characters' relationships, the locket, and their promises. It is revealed Chitoge, Kosaki, Marika, and Yui all possess keys, and that they all knew each other ten years ago, making one of them Raku's "promise girl".

After numerous adventures with the girls and several confessions, Raku realizes that he has fallen for both Chitoge and Kosaki, then must choose. A final confrontation prompts the group to travel and uncover the truth behind the keys, as well as what happened ten years ago, which will lead to the final confessions.

== Characters ==
Raku Ichijo (一条 楽, Ichijō Raku)
Voiced by: Yoshitsugu Matsuoka (vomic), Koki Uchiyama (drama CD, anime)
A high school student, Raku aspires to pursue a normal career as a civil servant when he graduates despite being the son of a Yakuza family leader.^{Ch. 1} When he is placed in a fake relationship with Chitoge Kirisaki, he hides his feelings for the girl who he has a crush on, Kosaki Onodera.^{Ch. 4–5} He wears a locket that symbolizes a promise of love he made to a girl ten years ago while traveling with his father abroad and hopes he can reunite with the girl who bears the key to unlock it. He initially hates Chitoge, seeing her as hot-tempered and violent, and sometimes refers to her as a "gorilla woman". Despite this, he has shown kindness to her at times and develops uncertainty as to which girl he likes the most.^{Ch. 63, 100, 171, 176–178} After Marika withdraws from pursuing him, she reveals to him that he loves both Kosaki and Chitoge, and should choose between them.^{Ch. 195} Raku realizes that he likes Chitoge beyond just friends,^{Ch. 199, 200} and despite learning that Kosaki was his promised girl, he ultimately chooses Chitoge. In the final chapter, it is revealed he has become a government worker in the city's public safety department and is the second boss of his family's Yakuza gang who helps him protect the city. He and Chitoge are married and have a son named Haku who inherited their respective traits.^{Ch. 229}
Chitoge Kirisaki (桐崎 千棘, Kirisaki Chitoge)
Voiced by: Haruka Tomatsu (vomic), Nao Tōyama (drama CD, anime)
Chitoge is a half-Japanese transfer student from the United States and the daughter of the leader of the Beehive Gangsters. She initially detested Raku, seeing him as arrogant and quick to lecture others, but pretends to be in a relationship with him to prevent their family gangs from going to war.^{Ch. 1} She is quick to anger and has sometimes acted violently towards Raku. Ten years before, Chitoge makes a promise with a boy, but does not realize it could be Raku until she finds a key that could potentially unlock his locket.^{Ch. 21} She develops feelings towards Raku and becomes jealous when girls such as Marika show open affections towards him, which he sometimes uses to his advantage to make her angry.^{Ch. 35} Eventually, despite denying it, she realizes that she loves him very much, and changes her internal attitude while still referring to him as annoying in public.^{Ch. 49, 51} She is very smart and talented at most tasks except for cooking.^{Ch. 56, 67, 116} She and her mom had a "cold" relationship until Raku helps them reconcile with each other on Christmas.^{Ch. 59} Later, she accidentally found out that Raku and Kosaki had liked each other since middle school. To help them get together she runs away from home, unaware that Raku also likes her. After being convinced by Marika to be honest with her feelings, Chitoge confessed her love for Raku at the place where Raku made the promise with the promised girl, and was happy when Raku accepted her feelings. In the final chapter, it is revealed that she is married to Raku and has become a fashion designer.^{Ch. 229}
Kosaki Onodera (小野寺 小咲, Onodera Kosaki)
Voiced by: Kana Hanazawa (drama CD, anime)
Kosaki Onodera is a kind and sweet classmate of Raku. She has shoulder-length dark brown hair and chestnut brown eyes. Although Raku likes her, she does not reveal that she also likes him. She bears a key that could unlock Raku's locket but denies it when Raku asks and becomes timid and easily flustered whenever they have a potential romantic situation.^{Ch. 4, 5} Her family owns a dessert shop where she fashions good-looking treats, but she makes terrible food when left to her own devices.^{Ch. 7, 19} She is not as academically strong as her friends, but studied hard to enter the same high school as Raku.^{Ch. 98} As time passes her love for Raku grows and her determination to get him notice her feelings becomes stronger, declaring she will fight for it.^{Ch. 126} She and Raku have similar personalities, showing care for others, but are shy when it comes to confessing their mutual feelings. It was revealed that Kosaki was the promised girl.^{Ch. 221} While looking for Chitoge after she ran away at the place where they made the promise, Kosaki realizes that Raku has fallen for Chitoge, and despite a final confession, is gently rejected. In the last chapter, she has become a patissier, making the wedding cake for Raku and Chitoge.^{Ch. 229}
Shu Maiko (舞子 集, Maiko Shū)
Voiced by: Yuki Kaji (drama CD, anime)
Shū is Raku's best friend. He enjoys doing anything for a laugh and often makes perverted passes or comments without shame to his friends. He is perceptive of Raku's relationships, knowing immediately that Raku was not really dating Chitoge, that Raku and Kosaki have secret crushes on each other,^{Ch. 8} and that Tsugumi has developed romantic feelings for Raku.^{Ch. 20} Academically, he places next to "glasses buddy" Ruri, much to the latter's chagrin.^{Ch. 56, 58} He has not expressed romantic interest in Raku's friends, but in one storyline, he has a crush on their homeroom teacher Kyoko.^{Ch. 84} He has known that Chitoge has become more than just a friend to Raku before Raku even does.^{Ch. 195} In the final chapter, he had become a teacher and is living with Ruri; he organizes the wedding for Raku and Chitoge.^{Ch. 229}
Claude (クロード, Kurōdo)
Voiced by: Takehito Koyasu (drama CD, anime)
Claude, one of the leaders of the Beehive gangsters, is one of the few characters who suspects the relationship between Raku and Chitoge is fake.^{Ch. 2} He stalks Chitoge regularly to make sure Raku does not take advantage of her.^{Ch. 3, 5} Chitoge stated that when she was young, she was unable to make friends because of Claude's overprotectiveness and background checking. He raises Tsugumi as a hitman, gave her a boy's name, Seishirou, completely oblivious of her gender.^{Ch. 17} In the final chapter, he has become Beehive's new leader after Chitoge's father resigned to live his life with Hana, and is getting along better with Raku.^{Ch. 229}
Ruri Miyamoto (宮本 るり, Miyamoto Ruri)
Voiced by: Yumi Uchiyama (drama CD, anime)
Ruri is Kosaki's best friend. She often speaks what is on her mind and pushes Kosaki to get closer to Raku,^{Ch. 8} setting up many scenarios to help her. She regularly punches Shu Maiko for his perverted opinions,^{Ch. 10, 11} but sometimes respects what he has to say.^{Ch. 58} In later chapters, Ruri realizes she has fallen in love with Shu as she is drawn to his inner struggle.^{Ch. 209} Ruri eventually confesses to him and states that she will wait for Shu to let go of his feelings for his first love Kyoko.^{Ch. 223} In the final chapter, Ruri is working as a translator and lives with Shu.^{Ch. 229}
Seishiro Tsugumi (鶫 誠士郎, Tsugumi Seishirō; also: Seishirou Tsugumi)
Voiced by: Mikako Komatsu (drama CD, anime)
"Black Tiger" Tsugumi is a hitwoman who was raised and trained by Claude of the Beehive Gangsters.^{Ch. 14–16} Originally introduced as a transfer student in Chitoge's class, she prefers to dress in shirt and pants of the boys uniform, and is mistaken for a boy by Raku and the others. Suspecting Chitoge was forced by Raku into the relationship, she tries to fight him.^{Ch. 15} She and Chitoge are childhood friends; she tries to keep a promise made ten years ago of becoming strong to protect Chitoge.^{Ch. 16} After Raku treats her nicely, she begins to develop feelings for him, even though she is too stubborn and embarrassed to admit it.^{Ch. 18, 20, 40} She shares a rivalry with "White Fang" Paula McCoy.^{Ch. 54} She does well academically, having ranked next to Chitoge on an early exam.^{Ch. 56} Raku has occasionally confided with her as a good friend and also for romance advice.^{Ch. 68, 79–83} She occasionally has vivid daydreams of being Raku's secret lover. She does not realize Raku and Chitoge's relationship is a fake one until much later in the series.^{Ch.204–206} In the end chapter, she has become the exclusive fashion model for Chitoge and has grown out her hair.^{Ch. 229}
Marika Tachibana (橘 万里花, Tachibana Marika)
Voiced by: Kana Asumi (drama CD, anime)
Marika transfers to Raku's class and is introduced as Raku's fiancée. She bears a key that she thinks will unlock Raku's pendant, and is the most vocal about expressing her love to Raku. Marika is the daughter of the police commissioner, Gen, and has been in love with Raku for the past ten years.^{Ch. 33} She does not get along with Chitoge, stating she hates girls with long hair despite the fact that she also has long hair.^{Ch. 34} Although Marika has a reputation of being a fighter, she has a frail constitution; ten years prior, she was frequently visited by a young Raku, who brought her gifts and sparked a friendship with her. Because Raku mentions he likes a girly girl with long hair, she grows her hair out and tries to speak politely and feminine, only reverting to her crude Kyushu accent when flustered.^{Ch. 35–36} Her worsening health condition has motivated her to spend as much time with Raku as she can while hiding the burden from him.^{Ch. 169} She has a story arc where her failing health prompts her mother to withdraw her from Bonyari and forced to marry her mother's cousin. Although Raku and friends rescue her, Marika tells Raku that she will have to get treatment for her illness in America for two years or it will become fatal. She expects Raku to choose Chitoge or Kosaki by then or she will take him for herself.^{Ch. 180–195} In the final chapter, she cut her hair short and has completely recovered from her disease, and has the difficult task of finding a man that was better than Raku.^{Ch. 229}
Paula McCoy (ポーラ・マッコイ, Pōra Makkoi)
Voiced by: Manami Numakura (drama CD, anime)
Paula is an assassin for the Beehive gangsters who has trained in America; her alias is "White Fang."^{Ch. 54} She is a colleague of Tsugumi, whom she considers her rival as she has finished second to her in many missions. She is upset that Tsugumi has gotten soft after going to Japan.^{Ch. 54} When she challenges Tsugumi to a match where the goal is to steal a kiss from Raku,^{Ch. 54} she eventually loses and has to give up on Seishirou returning to America with her.^{Ch. 54, 55} She later returns to Japan as a student at Tsugumi's school.^{Ch. 75} After seeing that Tsugumi acts shy and embarrassed when near Raku, she sets up romantic situations where the two are together.^{Ch. 79, 80} She eventually opens up to the possibility of being friends with people after talking with Haru Onodera.^{Ch. 81, 82} In the final chapter, it is revealed that she went to graduate school and works in a lab as a scientist, something that was unexpected by everyone.^{Ch. 229}
Haru Onodera (小野寺 春, Onodera Haru)
Voiced by: Ayane Sakura (drama CD, anime)
Kosaki's sister who is a school year younger than Raku Ichijo and the gang.^{Ch. 75, 76} On her way to school she is saved from some delinquents by a mysterious prince (actually Raku)^{Ch. 75} and ends up with his locket.^{Ch. 76} Her first impression of Raku is negative as she believes that he is a womanizer who is trying to trick her sister, a dangerous yakuza, and a pervert for looking at her panties.^{Ch. 75, 76} She also refuses to return his locket until Raku convinces her that he is helping the prince.^{Ch. 78} Unlike her sister, she is a good cook.^{Ch. 77} She later reveals that she was helped by a guy in a mascot costume (also Raku) who treats her with vanilla ice cream.^{Ch. 94} Later, Haru finally warms up to Raku and realizes she too has fallen in love with him, although she puts her feelings aside to support her sister.^{Ch. 109} However, her attempts to have her sister and Raku draw closer often backfire and result in her interacting more often with Raku (much to her dismay).^{Ch. 110} In the final chapter, she has taken over the family business which became more popular due to her dessert.^{Ch. 229}
Suzu Ayakaji (彩風 涼, Ayakaji Suzu)
Voiced by: Kotori Koiwai (drama CD, anime)
Suzu Ayakaji, also known as Fuu (風), is the best friend and classmate of Haru Onodera and also one of the classmates of Paula McCoy.^{Ch. 75} Fuu has light fair skin with indigo eyes. She has thick, dark auburn hair that sports a braid with a pink ribbon on the left side of her hair. Fuu is very kind and understanding. She tries her best to make her friends happy and supports them.^{Ch. 107} She always looks for Haru and wishes for her to be happy.^{Ch. 171} Haru states she is a bit weird at times like when she asked Haru to model for her and getting a nosebleed in the process.^{Ch. 131, 132} When Haru starts to have feelings for Raku, Fuu understands her feelings for him and tries to find situations where she and Raku could be together.^{Ch. 131} In the final chapter, it is revealed that she has become a journalist who wrote a feature article about Haru and her shop.^{Ch. 229}
Yui Kanakura (奏倉 羽, Kanakura Yui)
Voiced by: Yui Horie (drama CD)
Yui is a childhood friend of Raku and the head of the Char Siu mafia from China.^{Ch. 118} Her family name is Japanese but given name is called by Chinese (羽 Yǔ). She comes back to Japan after spending several years overseas. She also knows Chitoge, Kosaki, and Marika, and like them, holds a key which could unlock Raku's locket.^{Ch. 119, 120} Although she is only two years older than Raku, she becomes Raku's homeroom and English teacher, having skipped many grades.^{Ch. 119} She also has romantic feelings for Raku, who views Yui just as his older sister.^{Ch. 126, 178} She has a story arc where she has one last bid for Raku's affection before her coming of age ceremony.^{Ch. 176} In the last chapter, it is revealed she is living in China and is pregnant.^{Ch. 229}

== Media ==
=== Manga ===
Written and illustrated by Naoshi Komi, Nisekoi started as a one-shot published in Shueisha's seasonal Jump Next! magazine on January 8, 2011. It was later serialized in the publisher's shōnen manga magazine Weekly Shōnen Jump from November 7, 2011, to August 8, 2016. 229 individual chapters were collected by Shueisha in 25 tankōbon volumes, published under its Jump Comics imprint between May 2, 2012, and October 4, 2016.

A 14-volume bunkobon re-print of the series, containing an epilogue set ten years after the main series' ending, were published from June 16 to December 18, 2023.

In December 2011, Shueisha published the first chapter in English online. The manga has been licensed in English by Viz Media and published in its digital magazine, Weekly Shonen Jump since November 26, 2012. They also released the 25 volumes in print from January 7, 2014, to January 2, 2018.

A spin-off manga, illustrated by Taishi Tsutsui, titled Magical Pâtissier Kosaki-chan!! (マジカルパティシエ小咲ちゃん!!, Majikaru Patishie Kosaki-chan!!), which features the character Kosaki Onodera as a magical girl, was serialized on Shueisha's Shōnen Jump+ online platform from December 1, 2014, to September 22, 2016. Shueisha collected its chapters in four tankōbon volumes, released from June 4, 2015, to October 4, 2016.

=== Anime ===
In May 2013, an anime television series adaptation was announced. The 20-episode anime adaptation was produced by Aniplex, Shaft, Shueisha and Mainichi Broadcasting System and directed by Akiyuki Shinbo, with Shinbo and Shaft staff (credited as Fuyashi Tō) handling series composition, Nobuhiro Sugiyama designing the characters and Naoki "Naotyu" Chiba, Kakeru Ishihama and Tomoki Kikuya composing the music. The series aired from January 11 to May 24, 2014.

The first opening theme is "Click" by ClariS. Starting from Episode 2, first ending theme besides "Click" for episode 1 is "Heart Pattern" by Nao Toyama. Starting from Episode 8, second ending theme is "Recover Decoration" (リカバーデコレーション, Rikabā Dekorēshon) by Kana Hanazawa.

The ending theme for episode 14 is "Step" by ClariS, while the same song is the second opening starting from episode 15. Starting from Episode 15, the third ending theme is "Trick Box" by Mikako Komatsu. The fourth ending theme is "Hanagonomi" (はなごのみ; lit. 'Fondness for Flowers') by Kana Asumi, starting from episode 18. The ending for episode 20 is "Sōzō Diary" (想像ダイアリー, Sōzō Daiarī; lit. 'Imagination Diary') by Toyama as Chitoge Kirisaki, Hanazawa as Kosaki Onodera, Komatsu as Seishirou Tsugumi, and Asumi as Marika Tachibana. On the Japanese Blu-ray version, the fourth ending theme is "Order × Order" (Note: オーダー×オーダー, Ōdā × Ōdā) by Yumi Uchiyama.

A total of four original video animations (OVAs) were produced and packaged with manga volumes 14, 16, 17, and 21.

A second season, titled Nisekoi:, aired between April 10 and June 26, 2015. The first opening theme is "Rally Go Round" by Lisa, and for episode 8, the opening theme is "Magical Styling" by Kana Hanazawa. Other ending theme highlights:

- "Aimai Hertz" (曖昧ヘルツ, Aimai Herutsu; lit. 'Ambiguous Hertz') by Toyama as Chitoge Kirisaki, Hanazawa as Kosaki Onodera, Komatsu as Seishirou Tsugumi, and Asumi as Marika Tachibana (Episodes 1, 3, and 6)
- "Trigger" (Episode 2)
- "Sleep Zzz" by Toyama (Episode 4)
- "Matador Rabu" (またどーらぶ, Matadō Rabu) by Asumi (Episode 7)
- "Marchen Ticktack" by Ayane Sakura (Episode 8)
- "Tooriame Drop" (通り雨drop; lit. 'Shower Drop') by Yumi Uchiyama (Episode 10)

Aniplex of America has licensed the series for streaming and home video distribution in North America.

=== Film ===
A live-action adaptation premiered in Japanese theaters on December 21, 2018. It was directed by Hayato Kawai and stars Kento Nakajima as Raku Ichijo and Ayami Nakajo as Chitoge Kirisaki, and distributed by Toho.

=== Other media ===
A three-volume novel series titled Nisekoi: Urabana (ニセコイ ウラバナ) was published by Shueisha under their Jump J-Books imprint. The novels are written by Hajime Tanaka and illustrated by Naoshi Komi. The first volume was published on June 4, 2013. It has stories concerning the main characters such as Kosaki sprouting cat ears from a virus, and Marika as a hit-woman. The second volume was released on December 28, 2013, with stories about the play and side-stories such as the gang working at a maid café. The third volume was released on April 3, 2015.

A voice comic (vomic) was released on June 1, 2012. It features Yoshitsugu Matsuoka as Raku Ichijo, Haruka Tomatsu as Chitoge Kirisaki, Hisako Kanemoto as Kosaki Onodera, and Daichi Kanbara as Shu Maiko.

The special edition of the ninth manga volume was bundled with a drama CD, released on November 1, 2013.

A visual novel titled Nisekoi: Yomeiri!? (ニセコイ ヨメイリ！？; Nisekoi: My Wife is Among Them!?) was developed by Konami and released for the PlayStation Vita on November 27, 2014. Konami also released a game for Android and iOS named Nisekoi: Majikore (ニセコイ マジコレ) from January 2014 until its closure on December 26, 2015. Chitoge appears as a supporting character in the Bandai Namco Games' crossover fighting game, J-Stars Victory VS, released in Japan in March 2014 and in North America and Europe in June 2015. Two Super Mario Maker Event Courses designed by Komi, along with an unlockable Mystery Mushroom costume of Chitoge for the game, were released on February 18, 2016.

== Reception ==
New York Times Manga Best-Seller List
Volume No.	Peak rank	Notes	Refs
1	5	4 weeks	
2	3	3 weeks	
3	7	3 weeks	
4	3	3 weeks	
5	4	2 weeks	
6	2	3 weeks	
7	8	1 week	
8	4	3 weeks	
9	6	1 week	
11	8	2 weeks	
16	7	1 week	
17	7	1 week	

Oricon Japanese comic rankings
Volume No.	Peak rank	Notes	Refs
1	13	1 week	
2	12	2 weeks	
3	10	2 weeks	
4	9	2 weeks	
5	8	3 weeks	
6	9	2 weeks	
7	6	2 weeks	
8	5	2 weeks	
9	8	3 weeks	
10	6	3 weeks	
11	8	3 weeks	
12	6	3 weeks	
13	4	3 weeks	
14	6	3 weeks	
15	3	3 weeks	
16	2	3 weeks	
17	4	4 weeks	
18	3	3 weeks	
19	7	3 weeks	
20	4	3 weeks	
21	5	2 weeks	
22	6	2 weeks	
23	11	3 weeks	
24	3	3 weeks	
25	3	3 weeks	

=== Manga ===
Nisekoi was listed at number 30 out of Oricon's top 30 manga series sold in 2013, with 1,542,417 copies sold. In 2014, it was ranked 16 out of top 30 manga series sold in 2014, with 3,816,372 which is more than twice the sale of 2013. As of April 2018, the manga had 12 million copies in print.

Rebecca Silverman of Anime News Network writes that the Nisekoi manga has a large lack of originality, such as "nearly every plot point can be traced back to another shōnen series (primarily Sumomomo, Momomo in terms of Raku's home life)". She also mentioned that "seasoned readers of shounen romance will recognize elements from at least three other series in there." However, Silvermon enjoyed the art and overall sense of fun.

Andy Hanley of UK Anime Network found Nisekoi: False Love to be "packed to the rafters with clichés" but light-hearted and fun to read. He said the character designs were traditional but the author knows when to detail backgrounds or keep things simple. The translations were decent and the dialogue smooth.

=== Anime ===
While reviewing the anime, Theron Martin of Anime News Network saw the "plot twist coming a mile away" but "the setup shows promise." Hope Chapman critiqued the show's pacing: "Telling a simple story in a complex way kills the pacing, in this case. Plot points and character moments that could be communicated in one minute take three in Shinbo-style, and it just doesn't add anything when the story is this small and straightforward." Carl Kimlinger found the "improbably romantic fantasy" done right, a story relatively enjoyable after having reviewed No-Rin.

In his UK Anime Network review of the first five episodes, Andy Hanley found the series an exercise in box ticking, if viewed cynically, but it "has simply taken old concepts and polished them until they're gleaming and immaculate – and it works". He felt that Shaft's animation style was a bit overbearing in the first episode, but settles well in accenting the important parts of the show. The voice cast captured the characters well, and the overall presentation was top notch.

== Explanatory notes ==
- "Ch." is a shortened form for chapter and refers to a chapter number of the Nisekoi manga.

Japanese
