= Naoshi Komi =

Japanese manga artist

Naoshi Komi 古味直志
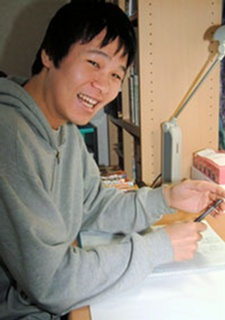
- Komi in his studio
- Born: March 28, 1986 (age 40) Tsuno, Japan
- Area: Manga artist
- Notable works: Nisekoi

Naoshi Komi (古味直志, Komi Naoshi; born March 28, 1986) is a Japanese manga artist. His works have debuted in Weekly Shōnen Jump magazine and its affiliates.

In 2008, he released Double Arts, which lasted for three tankōbon volumes. His best known and most widely circulated work, Nisekoi, about a pair of high school students from rival gang families that are forced to be a couple, was serialized in Weekly Shōnen Jump, and has spawned a wider media franchise, including an anime series and a live-action film.

== Biography ==
Komi was born in Tsuno, Takaoka District in the Kochi Prefecture. Komi debuted in Akamaru Jump in 2007. He said the magazine is known for featuring many newcomers. His first serialized work in Weekly Shonen Jump was Double Arts.

== Influences ==
Komi has cited One Piece as one of his major influences.

== Works ==
- Island (2007, Akamaru Jump)
- Koi no Kami-sama (2007, Weekly Shōnen Jump)
- Williams (2007, Weekly Shōnen Jump)
- Apple (2008, Young Magazine)
- Double Arts (2008, Weekly Shōnen Jump)
- Personant (2008, Jump Square)
- Nisekoi (2011–2016, Weekly Shōnen Jump)
- Toki Doki (2016, Weekly Shōnen Jump)
- e No Genten: Starting Point (2018, Weekly Shōnen Jump)
- ONE PIECE: Vivi no Bouken (2021, Weekly Shōnen Jump)
- Seijo no Chi (2022, Jump GIGA)

Crossover works

- Nisekyū!! (2012, Weekly Shōnen Jump) — with Haruichi Furudate.
- Ore Koi!! (2013, Weekly Shōnen Jump) — with Kazune Kawahara.
