= Lists of manga =

Manga (漫画, IPA: [maŋga] ^{ⓘ}) are comics created in Japan, or by Japanese creators in the Japanese language, conforming to a style developed in Japan in the late 19th century. The term is also now used for a variety of other works in the style of or influenced by the Japanese comics. The production of manga in many forms remains extremely prolific, so a single list covering all the notable works would not be a useful document. Accordingly, coverage is divided into the many related lists below.

== Lists of manga titles ==
- List of best-selling manga
- List of Gangan Comics manga franchises
- List of Gundam manga and novels
- List of manga magazines
  - List of Japanese manga magazines by circulation
  - List of series run in Jump Square
  - List of series run in Monthly Afternoon
  - List of series run in Shōnen Book
  - List of series run in Shōnen Jump+
  - List of series run in Ultra Jump
  - List of series run in Weekly Shōnen Jump
  - List of series run in Weekly Shōnen Magazine
  - List of series run in Weekly Shōnen Sunday
- List of manga published by Kadokawa Shoten
- List of manga published by Akita Shoten
- List of manga published by ASCII Media Works
- List of manga published by Hakusensha
- List of manga published by Kodansha
- List of manga published by Shogakukan
- List of manga published by Shueisha
- List of manga series by volume count
- Lists of manga volumes and chapters
- List of The New York Times Manga Best Sellers
  - The New York Times Manga Best Sellers of 2009
  - The New York Times Manga Best Sellers of 2010
  - The New York Times Manga Best Sellers of 2011
  - The New York Times Manga Best Sellers of 2012
  - The New York Times Manga Best Sellers of 2013
  - The New York Times Manga Best Sellers of 2014
  - The New York Times Manga Best Sellers of 2015
- Lists of Oricon number-one manga
  - List of Oricon number-one manga of 2008
  - List of Oricon number-one manga of 2012
  - List of Oricon number-one manga of 2013
  - List of Oricon number-one manga of 2014
  - List of Oricon number-one manga of 2015
  - List of Oricon number-one manga of 2016
- List of Osamu Tezuka manga
- List of Pokémon manga
- List of romance manga

== Lists of manga producers ==
- List of manga artists
- List of manga publishers
- List of manga distributors

== Lists of related media ==
- List of manhua
- List of manhwa

== See also ==
- Lists of anime
- Category: Lists of anime and manga characters
- List of films based on manga
- List of video games based on anime or manga
