= The New York Times Manga Best Sellers of 2014 =

This is a list of manga that topped The New York Times Manga Best Seller list in 2014.

Date	Book	Author	Publisher
January 5	Attack on Titan, Vol. 1	Hajime Isayama	Kodansha Comics
January 12	Attack on Titan, Vol. 1	Hajime Isayama	Kodansha Comics
January 19	Attack on Titan, Vol. 10	Hajime Isayama	Kodansha Comics
January 26	Naruto, Vol. 64	Masashi Kishimoto	Viz Media
February 2	Naruto, Vol. 64	Masashi Kishimoto	Viz Media
February 9	Naruto, Vol. 64	Masashi Kishimoto	Viz Media
February 16	Attack on Titan, Vol. 11	Hajime Isayama	Kodansha Comics
February 23	Bleach. Vol. 59	Tite Kubo	Viz Media
March 2	Bleach. Vol. 59	Tite Kubo	Viz Media
March 9	Blood Lad, Vol. 4	Yuuki Kodama	Yen Press
March 16	Attack on Titan, Vol. 1	Hajime Isayama	Kodansha Comics
March 23	One Piece, Vol. 70	Eiichiro Oda	Viz Media
March 30	Attack on Titan: Before the Fall, Vol. 1	Hajime Isayama, Ryo Suzukaze and Satoshi Shiki	Kodansha Comics
April 6	Attack on Titan: Before the Fall, Vol. 1	Hajime Isayama, Ryo Suzukaze and Satoshi Shiki	Kodansha Comics
April 13	Mobile Suit Gundam: The Origin, Vol. 5	Yoshikazu Yasuhiko	Vertical
April 20	Naruto, Vol. 65	Masashi Kishimoto	Viz Media
April 27	Naruto, Vol. 65	Masashi Kishimoto	Viz Media
May 4	Naruto, Vol. 65	Masashi Kishimoto	Viz Media
May 11	WataMote, Vol. 3	Nico Tanigawa	Yen Press
May 18	Attack on Titan, Vol. 12	Hajime Isayama	Kodansha Comics
May 25	Monster Musume, Vol. 3	Okayado	Seven Seas Entertainment
June 1	Monster Musume, Vol. 3	Okayado	Seven Seas Entertainment
June 8	Monster Musume, Vol. 3	Okayado	Seven Seas Entertainment
June 15	Dragonar Academy, Vol. 2	Shiki Mizuchi	Seven Seas Entertainment
June 22	Pokémon Adventures: Diamond & Pearl /Platinum, Vol. 2	Hidenori Kusaka	Viz Media
June 29	Crimson Spell, Vol. 4	Ayano Yamane	Viz Media
July 6	Mobile Suit Gundam: The Origin, Vol. 6	Yoshikazu Yasuhiko	Vertical
July 13	Attack on Titan: No Regrets, Vol. 1	Gun Snark, Hikaru Suruga and Hajime Isayama	Kodansha Comics
July 20	Naruto, Vol. 66	Masashi Kishimoto	Viz Media
July 27	Naruto, Vol. 66	Masashi Kishimoto	Viz Media
August 3	Naruto, Vol. 66	Masashi Kishimoto	Viz Media
August 10	Naruto, Vol. 66	Masashi Kishimoto	Viz Media
August 17	Black Butler, Vol. 17	Yana Toboso	Yen Press
August 24	Rosario+Vampire; Season II, Vol. 13	Akihisa Ikeda	Viz Media
August 31	Crimson Spell, Vol. 5	Ayano Yamane	Viz Media
September 7	Monster Musume, Vol. 4	Okayado	Seven Seas Entertainment
September 14	Attack on Titan, Vol. 13	Hajime Isayama	Kodansha Comics
September 21	Yu-Gi-Oh! 5D's, Vol. 6	Masahiro Hikokubo	Viz Media
September 28	Yu-Gi-Oh! 5D's, Vol. 6	Masahiro Hikokubo	Viz Media
October 5	Noragami, Vol. 1	Adachitoka	Kodansha Comics
October 12	Attack on Titan, Vol. 1	Hajime Isayama	Kodansha Comics
October 19	Mobile Suit Gundam: The Origin, Vol. 7	Yoshikazu Yasuhiko	Vertical
October 26	Naruto, Vol. 67	Masashi Kishimoto	Viz Media
November 2	Vampire Knight, Vol. 19	Matsuri Hino	Viz Media
November 9	No Game, No Life, Vol. 1	Yuu Kamiya	Seven Seas Entertainment
November 16	Attack on Titan: No Regrets, Vol. 2	Gun Snark, Hikaru Suruga and Hajime Isayama	Kodansha Comics
November 23	Attack on Titan, Vol. 14	Hajime Isayama	Kodansha Comics
November 30	Attack on Titan, Vol. 14	Hajime Isayama	Kodansha Comics
December 7	Monster Musume, Vol. 5	Okayado	Seven Seas Entertainment
December 14	Monster Musume, Vol. 5	Okayado	Seven Seas Entertainment
December 21	Naruto, Vol. 68	Masashi Kishimoto	Viz Media
December 28	Naruto, Vol. 68	Masashi Kishimoto	Viz Media

== See also ==
- The New York Times Fiction Best Sellers of 2014
- The New York Times Non-Fiction Best Sellers of 2014
