= The New York Times Manga Best Sellers of 2015 =

This is a list of manga that topped The New York Times Manga Best Seller list in 2015.

Date	Book	Author	Publisher
January 4	Attack on Titan, Vol. 1	Hajime Isayama	Kodansha Comics
January 11	Kingdom Hearts II, Vol. 3	Shiro Amano	Yen Press
January 18	Unofficial Hatsune Mix	Kei	Dark Horse Comics
January 25	Sword Art Online: Fairy Dance, Vol. 2	Reki Kawahara and Tsubasa Haduki	Yen Press
February 1	Finder, Vol. 7	Ayano Yamane	Digital Manga
February 8	Akame ga Kill!, Vol. 1	Takahiro and Tetsuya Tashiro	Yen Press
February 15	Akame ga Kill!, Vol. 1	Takahiro and Tetsuya Tashiro	Yen Press
February 22	Assassination Classroom, Vol. 2	Yūsei Matsui	Viz Media
March 1	Neon Genesis Evangelion, Vol. 14	Yoshiyuki Sadamoto	Viz Media
March 8	Akame ga Kill!, Vol. 1	Takahiro and Tetsuya Tashiro	Yen Press
March 15	JoJo's Bizarre Adventure: Phantom Blood, Vol. 1	Hirohiko Araki	Viz Media
March 22	Naruto, Vol. 69	Masashi Kishimoto	Viz Media
March 29	Monster Musume, Vol. 6	Okayado	Seven Seas
April 5	Attack on Titan, Vol. 15	Hajime Isayama	Kodansha Comics
April 12	Attack on Titan, Vol. 15	Hajime Isayama	Kodansha Comics
April 19	Attack on Titan, Vol. 15	Hajime Isayama	Kodansha Comics
April 26	One Piece, Vol. 74	Eiichiro Oda	Viz Media
May 3	Big Hero 6, Vol. 1	Haruki Ueno	Yen Press
May 10	Akame ga Kill!, Vol. 2	Takahiro and Tetsuya Tashiro	Yen Press
May 17	Mobile Suit Gundam: The Origin, Vol. 9	Yoshikazu Yasuhiko	Vertical
May 24	The Legend of Zelda: A Link to the Past, Vol. 9	Shotaro Ishinomori	Viz Media
May 31	The Legend of Zelda: A Link to the Past, Vol. 9	Shotaro Ishinomori	Viz Media
June 7	The Legend of Zelda: A Link to the Past, Vol. 9	Shotaro Ishinomori	Viz Media
June 14	The Legend of Zelda: A Link to the Past, Vol. 9	Shotaro Ishinomori	Viz Media
June 21	Naruto, Vol. 70	Masashi Kishimoto	Viz Media
June 28	Naruto, Vol. 70	Masashi Kishimoto	Viz Media
July 5	Tokyo Ghoul, Vol. 1	Sui Ishida	Viz Media
July 12	The Legend of Zelda: A Link to the Past, Vol. 10	Yoshikazu Yasuhiko	Vertical
July 19	Sword Art Online: Progressive, Vol. 2	Reki Kawahara and Kiseki Himura	Yen Press
July 26	Tokyo Ghoul, Vol. 1	Sui Ishida	Viz Media
August 2	The World's Greatest First Love, Vol. 2	Shungiku Nakamura	Viz Media
August 9	Tokyo Ghoul, Vol. 1	Sui Ishida	Viz Media
August 16	Tokyo Ghoul, Vol. 1	Sui Ishida	Viz Media
August 23	Naruto, Vol. 71	Masashi Kishimoto	Viz Media
August 30	Monster Musume, Vol. 7	Okayado	Seven Seas
September 6	Tokyo Ghoul, Vol. 2	Sui Ishida	Viz Media
September 13	Attack on Titan, Vol. 16	Hajime Isayama	Kodansha Comics
September 20	One-Punch Man (Remake), Vol. 1	One	Viz Media
September 27	One-Punch Man (Remake), Vol. 1	One	Viz Media
October 4	Tokyo Ghoul, Vol. 1	Sui Ishida	Viz Media
October 11	Mobile Suit Gundam: The Origin, Vol. 11	Yoshikazu Yasuhiko	Vertical
October 18	Tokyo Ghoul, Vol. 2	Sui Ishida	Viz Media
October 25	Naruto, Vol. 72	Masashi Kishimoto	Viz Media
November 1	Naruto, Vol. 72	Masashi Kishimoto	Viz Media
November 8	Tokyo Ghoul, Vol. 3	Sui Ishida	Viz Media
November 15	Tokyo Ghoul, Vol. 3	Sui Ishida	Viz Media
November 22	One-Punch Man (Remake), Vol. 3	One	Viz Media
November 29	Tokyo Ghoul, Vol. 1	Sui Ishida	Viz Media
December 6	One-Punch Man (Remake), Vol. 2	One	Viz Media
December 13	One-Punch Man (Remake), Vol. 1	One	Viz Media
December 20	Assassination Classroom, Vol. 7	Yūsei Matsui	Viz Media
December 27	One-Punch Man (Remake), Vol. 1	One	Viz Media

== See also ==
- The New York Times Fiction Best Sellers of 2015
- The New York Times Non-Fiction Best Sellers of 2015
- List of Oricon number-one manga of 2015
- 2015 in manga
