= Hajime Ootani =

Japanese animator

Hajime Ootani 大谷 肇
- Born: September 22, 1979 (age 46); Fukui Prefecture, Japan
- Occupations: Animator, director, storyboard artist
- Years active: 2004–present
- Employer: Imagin (2004–2011)
- Known for: Pretty Boy Detective Club

Hajime Ootani (Japanese: 大谷 肇, Hepburn: Ōtani Hajime) is a Japanese animator, director, and storyboard artist.

== Early life ==
Ootani was born in Fukui Prefecture on September 22, 1979. He first became interested in animation while in high school after seeing Hayao Miyazaki's film Princess Mononoke.

== Career ==
Ootani joined studio Imagin as an in-between animator around 2004. He mostly worked as a sub-contracting animator, and eventual episode director, for Madhouse and Imagin. He made his directorial debut with an OVA adaptation of Ayano Yamane's manga A Foreign Love Affair. Ootani's final projects with Imagin were Needless (2009) and Wolverine (2011), which the studio assisted under Madhouse for, where he was promoted to series assistant director.

After the dissolution of Imagin, former studio producer Yasuhiro Okada joined studio Shaft with Ootani, where the latter mainly did episodic direction and storyboard art. In 2020, he made his series directorial debut as the chief episode director on Assault Lily Bouquet with Shouji Saeki, and the following year debuted as director of Pretty Boy Detective Club under Akiyuki Shinbo. After Pretty Boy Detective Club, he decided that he wanted to try directing at a different studio since he had been working with Shaft for so long; so, in the middle of the production for the series Dance Dance Danseur, produced by MAPPA, he was asked if he wanted to join the series as its "ballet director."

=== Style ===
In an interview between him and Shaft colleague Kenjirou Okada, the two were asked to describe each other's styles and processes as directors. Okada stated that Ootani didn't hesitate to put appealing art and animations first and foremost, and that he admired that about Ootani. Akiyuki Shinbo also commented in a separate interview that he felt Ootani and himself had similar visual sensibilities. Shinbo also said that Ootani was particularly good at horror-esque work, referencing episode 12 of March Comes In like a Lion season 2 (episode 34 overall) and the similarities in atmosphere between it and parts of Pretty Boy Detective Club. Commenting on Ootani's work with Okada, who acted as assistant director for Pretty Boy Detective Club, Shinbo also said that the two complemented each other's weaknesses and strengths as directors. Despite originally being inspired by director Hayao Miyazaki, Ootani has commented that his style is much more eccentric and different from Miyazaki's, which he described was due to trying to survive and stand out in the industry.

== Works ==
=== Television series ===
Year	Title	Director(s)	Studio	SB (Note: Storyboard artist.)	ED (Note: Episode director, equivalent to unit director.)	Other roles and notes	Ref(s)
2005	Strawberry 100%	Osamu Sekita	Madhouse	No	No	In-between animator	
2005	Oku-sama wa Joshi Kōsei	Jun Shishido	Madhouse	No	No	In-between animator Key animator	
2005	Eyeshield 21	Masayoshi Nishida	Gallop	No	Yes		
2005	My-Otome	Masakazu Obara	Sunrise	No	No	Assistant episode director	
2006	Strawberry Panic!	Masayuki Sakoi	Madhouse	No	Yes	Key animator	
2006	Yume Tsukai	Kazuo Yamazaki	Madhouse	No	Yes		
2006	The Story of Saiunkoku	Jun Shishido	Madhouse	No	Yes		
2007	Saiunkoku Monogatari Second Series	Jun Shishido	Madhouse	No	Yes		
2008	Kamen no Maid Guy	Masayuki Sakoi	Madhouse	No	Yes		
2008	Chaos;Head	Takaaki Ishiyama	Madhouse	No	Yes		
2009	Needless	Masayuki Sakoi	Madhouse	Yes	Yes	Assistant director Opening director and storyboard	
2011	Wolverine	Hiroshi Aoyama	Madhouse	Yes	Yes	Assistant director	
2012	Nisemonogatari	Akiyuki Shinbo; Tomoyuki Itamura (series)	Shaft	Yes	No		
2015	Gourmet Girl Graffiti	Akiyuki Shinbo (chief); Naoyuki Tatsuwa	Shaft	No	Yes		
2015	Nisekoi:	Akiyuki Shinbo (chief); Yukihiro Miyamoto (chief episode)	Shaft	Yes	Yes		
2015	Owarimonogatari	Akiyuki Shinbo (chief); Tomoyuki Itamura	Shaft	No	Yes		
2016	March Comes In like a Lion	Akiyuki Shinbo; Kenjirou Okada (series)	Shaft	Yes	Yes	Opening director and storyboard	
2017	March Comes In like a Lion 2nd Season	Akiyuki Shinbo; Kenjirou Okada (series)	Shaft	Yes	Yes	Assistant episode director	
2018	Zoku Owarimonogatari	Akiyuki Shinbo	Shaft	Yes	Yes		
2020	Magia Record: Puella Magi Madoka Magica Side Story	Doroinu (chief); Various	Shaft	Yes	Yes		
2020	Assault Lily Bouquet	Shouji Saeki; Hajime Ootani (chief episode)	Shaft	Yes	Yes		
2021	Pretty Boy Detective Club	Akiyuki Shinbo (chief); Hajime Ootani	Shaft	Yes	Yes	Ending director	
2022	Dance Dance Danseur	Munehisa Sakai	MAPPA	Yes	Yes	Ballet director Ballet part episode director Ballet part storyboard	
2024	Bucchigiri?!	Hiroko Utsumi	MAPPA	Yes	Yes		
2026	Hell's Paradise: Jigokuraku Season 2	Kaori Makita	MAPPA	No	Yes	Opening director and storyboard artist	

=== OVAs ===
Year	Title	Director(s)	Studio	SB	ED	Other roles and notes	Ref(s)
2005	Saint Beast: Ikusen no Hiru to Yoru-hen	Masayuki Sakoi	Wonderfarm	No	No	In-between animator	
2006	A Foreign Love Affair	Hajime Ootani	Prime Time	Yes	Yes		
2009	Maiden Rose	Hidefumi Takagi	Prime Time	Yes	No		
2011	Katteni Kaizō	Akiyuki Shinbo (chief); Naoyuki Tatsuwa	Shaft	Yes	Yes		
2013	Magical Suite Prism Nana Pilot PVs (5 & 6)	URA (5); Takuya Iwamoto (6)	Shaft	No	Yes		
2016	The Beheading Cycle: The Blue Savant and the Nonsense Bearer	Akiyuki Shinbo (chief); Yuki Yase	Shaft	Yes	Yes		
2026	Magical Suite Prism Nana: Halloween in a Country of Medals – Noriko and the Fairy	Hajime Ootani	Shaft	Yes	Yes	Screenplay	

=== Films ===
Year	Title	Director(s)	Studio	SB	ED	Other roles and notes	Ref(s)
2025	The Rose of Versailles	Ai Yoshimura	MAPPA	Yes	Yes		

=== Video games ===
Year	Title	Studio	Roles	Ref(s)
2017	Magia Record (Arc I)	Shaft	Cutscene director and storyboard artist	

== Notes ==
=== Citations ===
- Aniplex (2021). Pretty Boy Detective Club Vol. 5 Special Booklet. Aniplex.
