= Kami-Kaze (manga) =

Japanese manga series

- First tankōbon volume cover, featuring Mikogami Misao (left) and Ishigami Kamuro (right)

神・風
- Genre: Action; Horror; Supernatural
- Manga
- Written by: Satoshi Shiki
- Published by: Kodansha
- English publisher: NA: Tokyopop
- Imprint: Afternoon KC Deluxe
- Magazine: Monthly Afternoon
- Original run: March 25, 1997 – February 25, 2003
- Volumes: 7
- icon

Kami-Kaze (Japanese: 神・風; lit. 'Divine Wind') is a Japanese manga series written and illustrated by Satoshi Shiki. It was published in Kodansha's seinen manga magazine Monthly Afternoon from March 1997 to February 2003, with its chapters collected in seven tankōbon volumes.

A 2-CD audio drama based on the manga was released in December 2003. An English translation of all seven volumes of the manga was released by Tokyopop between February 2006 and February 2008.

== Plot ==
One thousand years ago, 88 beasts descended upon Earth, threatening humanity. Five elemental warriors, the pure-blood members of the mystical tribes of the Matsurowanu Kegai no Tami (化外の民) stood before the beasts. Just as they were being sent down into a dimensional prison, the Beasts cursed the warriors of Sky, Wind and Fire, so one day their descendants will be lured into freeing the Beasts, granting the demons another chance at destroying mankind.

In present-day Japan, the cursed descendants turn their backs on the warriors of Earth and Water and seek the gates to the dimensional prison that hold the 88 Beasts. The story follows Mikogami Misao, the "Maiden of Water", whose blood can unlock the prison that holds the fabled 88 Beasts, and Ishigami Kamuro, the Warrior of Earth.

== Characters ==
=== Descendants of the Kegai no Tami ===
==== Water ====
Mikogami Misao (御子神 みさお)
Voiced by: Satsuki Yukino (Drama CD)
Misao is an orphan living in a nunnery with kindly women. She is the "Maiden of Water", whose blood can bring back the 88 beasts who were banished 1,000 years ago. Because of this, she is wanted by the Shiranami five. Misao wants to be friends with "Sakurai" (Aiguma), who everyone believes is scary and psychotic. Misao is a timid, naive, but kind girl who often lived her life the way she thought it is appropriate. But when Ishigami comes forward asking for her help to stop the resurrection of the 88 Beasts, for the first time Misao speaks up on her own, and this gives her new sense of confidence and inner strength that she had kept locked away in her for so long. In addition, the "true" self, Misao the Girl of Water, seemed to have awakened as a result of the newfound strength, and she will not hesitate to unleash her fury upon those who crosses her.
Mikogami Sae (御子神 佐依)
The former chief of Mizu No Tami tribe and grandmother to Misao. She explains to Misao about the impending conflict among the Kegai No Tami tribes over the resurrection of the 88 Beasts, and that she is the only one left with the capabilities of the Mizu therefore she must become the next Chief of her tribe. She is killed by Kaede in Volume 3.

==== Earth ====
Ishigami Kamuro (石神 カムロ)
Voiced by: Akira Ishida (Drama CD)
The Man of Earth, a mysterious warrior who is a part of the Kegai no Tami. He was born with a stone in his hand, which he claims helps him to heighten his combat instincts, along with closing his eyes. He has also said he has yet to find an opponent who can exceed his instincts, but later finds this opponent in the form of Higa-sama. Afterwards Ishigami gives the stone to Misao, as a reminder of her promise to fight at his side. Ishigami wields the legendary Kamikaze, a katana passed down through generations of the Earth tribe.
Ishigami Daidara (石神 ダイダラ)
Voiced by: Mugihito (Drama CD)
The previous chief of the Chi and grandfather of Kamuro. After the Shiranami Five sacked the Chi village and annihilated the inhabitants, Daidara tells Kamuro to kill him so that he can become stronger to stop the rival Kegai No Tamis from resurrecting the Beasts.
Aida (会田)
A high school student and one of the few Chi No Tami left. He emerges as the Kegai No Tami Hunter, pursuing and executing any and all Fire and Wind warriors.

==== Fire ====
Higa Yu (比嘉 悠)
Voiced by: Toshihiko Seki (Drama CD)
The Man of Fire and one of the cursed descendants of the Kegai No Tami bent on freeing the 88 Beasts. He is cold-hearted and boastful of his strengths at first, but by Volume 5 he has been released from the Beasts' spell and joins Kamuro and Misao on their quest to stop the Beasts' conquest of the world. He is also the father of Zen, a young boy who is the key to saving the world.

==== Wind ====
Kaede (かえで)
Voiced by: Ai Orikasa (Drama CD)
The Lady of Wind and the wife of Higa. She has powers over Wind, and she is steadfast on her duty as Chief of Kaze No Tami to protect her clan, and will go over great lengths to do so. It is suggested that Kaede is a lesbian, forcing her subordinate, Aiguma, to sleep with her. After giving her blood to the Wind Torii she became more docile and eventually realizes her faults in resurrecting the 88 Beasts.
Zen (禅)
The son of Higa and Kaede, he represents the positive force in opposition to Kayano's negative energy. He also has powers of his own that matches Kayano.

==== Sky ====
Kayano (茅野)
The chief of the Utsuho no Tami. He dissolved the hypnotic spell placed upon the Sky, Fire and Wind Clans which triggered the start of the resurrection of the 88 beasts.

=== The Amatsu Three ===
The Amatsu Three are warriors under direct subordination to either Higa or Kaede. They may also be part of the Kegai No Tami clans.

Aiguma (藍隈)
Voiced by: Mami Kingetsu (Drama CD)
Known as "Sakurai" to her classmates. She works directly under Kaede, though half of the time she seems a bit afraid of her mistress, probably due to Kaede's sexual desires toward her. Whenever Aiguma fails a mission, Kaede punishes her by forcing them to sleep together.
Kaenguma (火焔隈)
Voiced by: Katsuyuki Konishi (Drama CD)
A cocky young man with the ability to control fire.
Beniguma (紅隈)
Voiced by: Ryō Hirohashi (Drama CD)
A middle-schooler with power over animals. She confides that she kills so there would be less humans to hurt the animals. She is abandoned by her group after a battle at school that went awry and left her seriously injured. She is tagging along with Ishigami though it is not certain if she has become his new ally. She also has a dog, Lancelot, who is also as vicious a killer as she is.
Oba-san (おばさん)
A middle aged woman who manages the team. She has no powers but is strong and vicious, and carries a rifle. She is like the mother figure of the group.

=== The Shiranami Five ===
The Shiranami Five are supernatural warriors, also part of the Kegai No Tami, with demonic powers which was a result of genetic alteration with the cells of the 88 Beasts. They are Higa's henchmen.

Rihei (利平)
A loud mouthed freak with electronic arms that can slice a head off as easily as a sword as well as fire bullets and bombs. He often wears goggles or mask, probably to hide his hideous face. His past is not known at the moment.
Rikimaru (力丸)
A deformed giant who speaks little and is wiser of the Five. His faith in the 88 beasts has wavered when he saw its true evil nature.
Kikunosuke (菊之助)
He is the self-proclaimed "Punk Goddess of Fortune". Kikunosuke was born with one hand in shape of a blade and as a result was rejected at birth and by his foster parents, hence his hatred for the humans.
Jyuzo (重三)
A man with ability to stretch his body parts into unusual proportions. He can also meld into the bodies of the Beasts and control them at his will.

== Media ==
=== Manga ===
Written and illustrated by Satoshi Shiki, Kami-Kaze was serialized in Kodansha's seinen manga magazine Monthly Afternoon from March 25, 1997, (Note: Debuted in the magazine's May 1997 issue, released on March 25, 1997.) to February 25, 2003. (Note: Finished in the magazine's April 2003 issue, released on February 25, 2003.) Its chapters were collected into seven individual tankōbon volumes, released from March 23, 1998, to November 21, 2003.

In April 2005, Tokyopop announced that they had licensed the series for English publication in North America. Seven volumes were released from February 7, 2006, to February 12, 2008.

==== Volumes ====
No.	Original release date	Original ISBN	English release date	English ISBN
1	March 23, 1998	978-4-06-319918-5	February 7, 2006	978-1-59532-924-0
1. "Misao"; 2. "Encounter"; 3. "Dawn"; 4. "Invasion"; 5. "Outcast Existence"; 6. "Destiny"; 7. "Two Itsushi"
2	April 21, 1999	978-4-06-334055-6	June 13, 2006	978-1-59532-925-7
8. "Homecoming"; 9. "Kaede"; 10. "Destruction of the Homeland"; 11. "Protector Of The Land, Otsuwa-sama"; 12. "Corrosion Part 1"; 13. "Corrosion Part 2"; 14. "Pride"; 15. "Wish"; 16. "Cracked Soul"; 17. "The Power That Draws Together"; 18. "Clash/Conviction"; 19. "The Trusting Heart"
3	April 21, 2000	978-4-06-334295-6	November 7, 2006	978-1-59532-926-4
20. "Another Sacred Sword"; 21. "Distrust"; 22. "Breaking with the Past"; 23. "To the Homeland"; 24. "The Predecessor Woman"; 25. "The Inheritor"; 26. "To Greater Power"; 27. "3000 Meters Under the Sea"; 28. "The Difference"; 29. "A Long Day"
4	January 23, 2001	978-4-06-334374-8	February 13, 2007	978-1-59532-927-1
30. "The Battle At Tokyo Harbor"; 31. "The Evolution of Power"; 32. "What A Warrior Would Do"; 33. "Evil Thoughts"; 34. "Kodoku"; 35. "Succession"; 36. "Utsuho-bito Kayano"; 37. "I Will Not Give Up"
5	January 23, 2002	978-4-06-334486-8	June 12, 2007	978-1-59532-928-8
38. "Will"; 39. "Face Forward"; 40. "Higami"; 41. "Devastation"; 42. "Princess Bishagatsuku"; 43. "The Torii of the Utsuho"; 44. "An Apparition"; 45. "A Choice Toward The Future"
6	November 21, 2003	978-4-06-334781-4	October 9, 2007	978-1-59532-929-5
46. "To Each Child"; 47. "Whirlpool of Hate"; 48. "Inside One's Memories"; 49. "Those Who are Unforgiven"; 50. "The Night Before Battle"; 51. "Those of Opposite Extremes"; 52. "The One Who Will Lead in the End"
7	November 21, 2003	978-4-06-334782-1	February 12, 2008	978-1-59532-930-1
53. "Abyss"; 54. "Chance Encounter"; 55. "Battle Of The Seals"; 56. "Voice"; 57. "Broken Soul"; 58. "Deep Sea"; "Epilogue"

=== Audio drama ===
A Kami-Kaze drama CD (ABCA-5030) was released on December 26, 2003. It was distributed by King Records.

== Reception ==
In Manga: The Complete Guide, writer Jason Thompson praised the manga's artwork, especially the designs of its "monsters [that were] possibly inspired by Japanese myth." He was more critical of the characters and plot, describing the latter as "scattered interesting images with the occasional comprehensible fight scene", and rated it two stars out of four.
