= Z-Mind =

1999 Japanese OVA series

思春期美少女合体ロボ ジーマイン (Shishunki Bishōjo Gattai Robo Z-MIND)
- Genre: Mecha, Action, Science fiction
- Original video animation
- Directed by: Yashuhiro Matsumura
- Produced by: Ken Matsumoto; Toru Hasegawa
- Written by: Fuyunori Gobu
- Music by: Kazuo Nobuta
- Studio: Sunrise; Imagin
- Licensed by: NA: Sentai Filmworks
- Released: February 25, 1999 – July 25, 1999
- Episodes: 6

Z-Mind (思春期美少女合体ロボ ジーマイン, Shishunki Bishōjo Gattai Robo Z-MIND; lit. The Union of The Adolescent Beauties Z-Mind also subtitled The Battling Days of The Shimatachi Virgins) is a six-episode OVA series produced by Sunrise and Bandai Visual, released from February 25, 1999, to July 25, 1999. The OVA series was initially released in North America on DVD in 2002 by Bandai Entertainment. At Otakon 2013 it was announced that the series, along with twelve other former Bandai Entertainment properties, were rescued by Sentai Filmworks.

== Plot ==
In 1976, an alien species known as the Orgapiens invades Earth. To combat them, the Japanese and American military forces have collaborated on a giant robot known as Z-Mind. Z-Mind is piloted by three sisters: Ayame, Renge and Sumire.

== Characters ==
Ayame Hanakawado (花川戸あやめ)
Voiced by: Yuri Amano (Japanese); Kelly Sheridan (English)
Renge Hanakawado (花川戸れんげ)
Voiced by: Mayumi Asano (Japanese); Maggie Blue O'Hara (English)
Sumire Hanakawado (花川戸すみれ)
Voiced by: Urara Miura (Japanese); Jocelyne Loewen (English)
Satsuki Hanakawado (花川戸さつき)
Voiced by: Emiko Itō (Japanese); Tabitha St. Germain (English)
Akira (あきら)
Voiced by: Akira Ishida (Japanese); Kirby Morrow (English)
Tatsunosuke (辰之助)
Voiced by: Kenichi Ogata (Japanese); Colin Murdock (English)
Koto Hanakawado (花川戸琴)
Voiced by: Atsuko Mine (Japanese); Ellen Kennedy (English)
Jim Pekinpah (ジム･ペキンパー)
Voiced by: Seizō Katō (Japanese); Ron Hadler (English)
Koji (甲児)
Voiced by: Kentarō Itō (Japanese); Brent Miller (English)

== Episode list ==
No.	Title	Original release date
1	"Metal Life-form in the Cherry Blossom Sky" "Sakura Sora Kōtetsu no Seimei Tai Shutsugen" (さくら空 鋼鉄の生命体出現)	February 25, 1999
2	"Family Love, the Battle of the 12th Year" "Kazoku Ai, 12 Nen Me no Tatakai" (家族愛 12年目の戦い)	March 25, 1999
3	"A Mother's Prayer, Satsuki in an Electromagnetic Cage" "Haha no Inori, Denji Ori no Satsuki" (母の祈り 電磁檻のさつき)	April 25, 1999
4	"The Discovery of the Mysterious Fourth Cockpit" "Hakken Nazo no Dai 4 Kokkupitto" (発見 謎の第4コックピット)	May 25, 1999
5	"Z-Mind's Amazing, Maximum Power" "Kyōji Jīman, MAX Pawā" (驚異 ジーマインMAXパワー)	June 25, 1999
6	"Tragedy, People Strewn About a Vacant Sky" "Aisetsu Kokū ni Chiriyuku Hito" (哀切 虚空に散りゆくひと)	July 25, 1999
