= A Foreign Love Affair =

Japanese manga series

- Cover of A Foreign Love Affair as published by Core Magazine

異国色恋浪漫譚 (Ikkoku Irokoi Romantan)
- Genre: Romantic comedy, Yakuza, Yaoi
- Manga
- Written by: Ayano Yamane
- Published by: Core Magazine
- English publisher: NA: Digital Manga Publishing
- Magazine: Drap
- Published: April 2004
- Volumes: 1
- Original video animation
- Directed by: Hajime Ootani
- Produced by: Yūichi Ishizu
- Written by: Umi Koishikawa
- Music by: Taka Miya
- Studio: Prime Time
- Released: December 21, 2007 – October 24, 2008
- Runtime: 27 minutes each
- Episodes: 2

A Foreign Love Affair (Japanese: 異国色恋浪漫譚, Hepburn: Ikoku Irokoi Romantan) is a Japanese manga series written and illustrated by Ayano Yamane. The manga is licensed in North America by Digital Manga Publishing, which released the first volume in March 2008, and in Germany by Tokyopop. It was adapted into a two-episode OVA in 2007.

== Plot ==
A Foreign Love Affair is about Ranmaru, the son of a yakuza mob. He marries his childhood friend yakuza daughter Kaoru-(through an arranged marriage) on an Italian cruise ship. Because they are Japanese, the couple becomes the center of attention on the boat. On their wedding night, they get into a fight, and Kaoru kicks Ranmaru out of their honeymoon suite. Ranmaru goes to the boat's bar, where he gets into a fight with some yakuza. He is helped by Alberto Valentiano, an Italian man fluent in Japanese. To show his gratitude, Ranmaru invites Alberto for a drink, which leads to them having sex. The next morning, Ranmaru discovers that Alberto is the ship's captain.

== Characters ==
Ranmaru Oumi (近江鸞丸, Oumi Ranmaru)
Voiced by: Kentarō Ito
He is the third-generation boss of his family clan and has recently entered a marriage of politics and convenience with a woman he has known since childhood. While stuck on his honeymoon in Italy, he first meets Alberto. During a confrontation with some foreign men who were checking him out, Alberto stops the fight and asserts his connections to the ship. After Kaoru kicks Ranmaru out of their hotel room following a violent fight, an embittered Ranmaru goes to the bar, where he encounters Ryuji and his subordinates, who engage him in a brawl until Alberto intervenes and helps him defeat them. As a thank-you, Alberto invites Ranmaru to stay in his private suite, where the two engage in playful foreplay and have sex.
Alberto "Al" Valentiano (アルベルト•ヴァレンティアナ, Aruberuto Varentiano)
Voiced by: Junichi Suwabe
A foreigner of Italian descent who meets Ranmaru during the latter's honeymoon; Alberto is shown to be fluent in many different languages including Japanese and English. He's revealed to be the captain of the cruise ship that Ranmaru is staying on.
Kaoru Oumi (近江薫, Oumi Kaoru)
Voiced by: Tomoko Kawakami (Episode 1), Yuki Kaida (Episode 2)
Ranmaru's childhood friend and wife through arranged marriage. After Ranmaru's father adopts her into his family, she becomes his sister and files for divorce in order to allow Ranmaru to marry Alberto and be happy with the man he loves.
Ryuji Gondo (権藤龍司, Gondō Ryūji)
Voiced by: Ryōtarō Okiayu
Carlo Valentiano (カルロ•ヴァレンティアナ, Karuro Varentiano)
Alberto's father, who possesses perverted tendencies and has developed an infatuation with Ranmaru, much to Alberto's dismay.

== Reception ==
Patricia Beard, writing for Mania Entertainment, found Alberto's capture of Ranmaru "sexy and funny", appreciating Yamane's attention to detail in the art. Beard noted there wasn't much character development, but regarded this as being symptomatic of the romantic comedy genre of A Foreign Love Affair. Rachel Bentham, writing for Active Anime, enjoyed the sexy character designs. Leroy Douresseaux, writing for Comic Book Bin described A Foreign Love Affair as "a bawdy comedy ... with intermittent scenes of torrid sex." A reader's poll for About.com for the best yaoi of 2008 ranked A Foreign Love Affair first. Deb Aoki speculated that its popularity could be due to its setting, the characters, and Yamane's character designs and "knack for drawing very hot guys in sizzling situations".
