= Clear Skies! =

Japanese manga

- Cover of Clear Skies! volume 1 as published by Tokuma Shoten

毎日晴天！ (Mainichi Seiten!)
- Genre: Yaoi
- Manga
- Written by: Akira Sugano
- Illustrated by: Etsumi Ninomiya
- Published by: Tokuma Shoten
- English publisher: NA: Digital Manga Publishing
- Magazine: Chara
- Original run: October 2000 – June 2001
- Volumes: 2

Clear Skies! (Japanese: 毎日晴天!, Hepburn: Mainichi Seiten!) is a Japanese manga series written by Akira Sugano and illustrated by Etsumi Ninomiya. The manga is licensed in North America by Digital Manga Publishing under its Juné imprint, which released the first volume on 28 August 2008. It's about four brothers living together, when one of the brother's old high school flame turns up and claims that he's married to the brothers' wild older sister, who is nowhere to be found, bringing his adopted son.

== Reception ==
Danielle Van Gorder described the premise as "an even more unlikely version of the Brady Bunch", and praised Ninomiya's work on the eyes of the characters. Holly Ellingwood praised the series' humour and character interactions, saying it's "a gentle and lovely story about what makes a family". Leroy Douresseaux describes the feel of the tale as being 'quiet, intimate', but sometimes 'a little too dry'.
