= Skyscrapers of Oz =

Japanese manga

オズの摩天楼 (Oz no Matenrou)
- Genre: Romance, Drama, Yaoi
- Manga
- Written by: Yoshino Somei
- Illustrated by: Row Takakura
- Published by: Tokuma Shoten
- English publisher: NA: Media Blasters
- Magazine: Chara
- Published: October 2001
- Volumes: 1

Skyscrapers of Oz (Japanese: オズの摩天楼, Hepburn: Oz no Matenrō) is a one-shot Japanese manga written by Yoshino Somei and illustrated by Row Takakura. The manga is licensed in North America by Media Blasters.

== Manga ==
Skyscrapers of Oz written by Yoshino Somei and illustrated by Row Takakura. The manga is licensed in North America by Media Blasters, which released the manga on August 15, 2004. Chara released the manga in Japan in October 2001.

== Reception ==
Eduardo M. Chavez from Mania.com criticises the manga's backgrounds as "pretty stale". Even though it was a "totally random yaoi" it sold twice as much as the Lodoss manga. The manga has been compared to fellow yaoi manga, Fake for its "haphazard chemistry" between the two protagonists.
