= Daphne in the Brilliant Blue =

Television anime

- DVD case front cover artwork for the North American DVD volume 1 release by Geneon Entertainment. Shown is the character Maia Mizuki, in civilian clothes.

光と水のダフネ (Hikari to Mizu no Dafune)
- Genre: Action, science fiction
- Manga
- Written by: Satoshi Shiki
- Published by: Shōnen Gahosha (original); Kodansha (re-release)
- English publisher: Tokyopop
- Magazine: Young King OURs
- Published: 2004 (Shōnen Gahosha); 2008 (Kodansha)
- Volumes: 1 (Shōnen Gahosha); 2 (Kodansha)
- Anime television series
- Directed by: Takashi Ikehata
- Produced by: Nobuhiro Osawa; Yuji Matsukura
- Written by: Seishi Minakami
- Music by: Kow Otani
- Studio: J.C.Staff
- Licensed by: AUS: Madman Entertainment; NA: Sentai Filmworks; UK: MVM Films
- Original network: TV Kanagawa
- English network: NA: Anime Network
- Original run: January 15, 2004 – July 3, 2004
- Episodes: 24 + 2 OVA

Daphne in the Brilliant Blue (Japanese: 光と水のダフネ, Hepburn: Hikari to Mizu no Dafune; lit. 'Daphne of Light and Water') is a Japanese anime television series animated by J.C.Staff and broadcast on TV Kanagawa from January to July 2004. The anime was originally licensed by Geneon USA. It is now licensed by Sentai Filmworks.

A manga adaptation illustrated by Satoshi Shiki, titled I - Daphne in the Brilliant Blue, was serialized in Young King OURs magazine and serves as a prequel to the television series.

== Story ==
In the future, water has covered much of the Earth due to the effects of global warming, leaving the human race to live on neighboring floating cities. The orphaned Maia Mizuki, fifteen years of age, just graduated from middle school and has already applied for employment in the elite Ocean Agency, part of the futuristic world government. Only the best, most intelligent, and physically fit students are eligible for admission. Maia, the series' protagonist, is set to become one of the few.

But her ideal life quickly falls apart. To her disappointment, Maia unexpectedly fails her entrance exams despite her high grades. Making matters worse, she promptly gets evicted from her house, pick pocketed, taken hostage, then shot. She is "saved" by two women (Rena and Shizuka) that are part of an unorthodox help-for-hire organization called Nereids (inspired by the Greek mythological Nereids). With nowhere to go, Maia joins up with Nereids, taking jobs from capturing wanted criminals to chasing stray cats, often with unexpected results. Gloria and Yu later join up with Nereids.

"Daphne", Greek for "Laurel tree", in the title refers to the last words said by Maia's grandfather. "Brilliant Blue" refers to the fact that this is a world covered by water with almost no land. The world consists of vast oceans, a few islands, and floating cities. This subplot that starts midway into the series concerns Maia's journey to retrieve a time capsule of her past buried under a laurel tree in Elpida, an undersea city lost over a century ago.

In almost every episode, there is a recitation of a verse that Maia's grandfather taught her. She and others say it whenever her life is difficult or in danger - "A tree that is planted by water will produce fruit in due season, its leaves will never wither...". It is never identified as Psalm 1:3, "He is like a tree planted by streams of water, which yields its fruit in season and whose leaf does not wither. Whatever he does prospers." (NIV)

The manga of the series is a prequel that takes place a century ago when humans were forced to live undersea when the cities were Greek named. Elpida means "hope." Now they're Russian inspired, like Kamchatka. Ai Mayuzumi, Millie's great-grandmother is the protagonist of the story.

== Characters ==
Maia Mizuki (水樹 マイア, Mizuki Maia)
Voiced by: Mai Nakahara (Japanese); Carrie Savage (English)
Maia is the protagonist of the series. She has lost all of her childhood memories, because as a child, Maia was put into a one year coma because of a car wreck. The cause of it was because while in the car with her parents, the controls malfunctioned. Her parents died. Waking up, she was introduced to a man claiming to be her grandfather. In episode 11, Maia tells the girls of Nereids her story of waking up from her coma. During the flashback, Maia asks her grandpa why whenever he smiles at her, he seems sad. At the end of the episode, she is looking at a picture of her grandfather then she asks, "What is it that you were keeping hidden from me, Grandpa." Although Maia is an excellent student she is rejected by the Ocean Agency, an elite paramilitary organization that is part of the futuristic world government. So instead Maia, broke and homeless, joins Nereids, an unorthodox help-for-hire organization inspired by the Greek mythological Nereids. She is optimistic, hard working, and honest, yet a naive and shy cute girl-next-door. Maia is in search of her past and continues to do so while working with Nereids.
Rena Honjō (本城 レナ, Honjō Rena)
Voiced by: Sayaka Ohara (Japanese); Wendee Lee (English)
Leader of the Nereids Kamchatka branch. Rena is capable, elegant, and cunning, although she can be cold at times. Although not the branch manager in title, she is the de facto leader and makes the decisions. She is cool and calculating and her sharp instincts enable her to know the weaknesses of other people. Rena has no moral qualms about seducing others for manipulation or for a weapon use. She is also frugal with money and deducts pay from salaries under even the slightest pretext.
Shizuka Hayama (葉山 静香, Hayama Shizuka)
Voiced by: Kana Ueda (Japanese); Michelle Ruff (English)
Busty and bespectacled with purple hair, Shizuka is a brilliant mechanic who grew up in an inner city district of Shibuya and knows many people there. She is known for her poor shooting aim and is friendly, casual, and trusting with a voracious appetite for food.
Gloria (グロリア, Guroria)
Voiced by: Masumi Asano (Japanese); Megan Hollingshead (English)
Loud, spontaneous, tomboyish, and somewhat reckless with a ganguro style complexion, Gloria is a trigger-happy champion marksman and the weapons specialist with a grudge against Rena for deserting her on a past mission. She tends to stick to her guns and loves to shoot things up and she does not get along with Yū. Gloria loves money and bothers Rena about how much she owes her. She is the only character without a regular civilian outfit.
Yū Park (朴 ゆう, Paku Yū)
Voiced by: Yūko Kaida (Japanese); Erika Weinstein (English)
Silent, brooding, nihilistic, and a loner, Yu is a ridiculously strong fighter and hand-to-hand combat specialist. She had her license revoked in the past for destroying private property and injuring several police officers (including Detective Yagi) and bystanders. She has a loyalty to Rena, but does not get along too well with Gloria, where comically they are usually paired up on assignments, and constantly hits her. Yu's interests include animals and travel.
Tsukasa Takagi (高城 つかさ, Takagi Tsukasa)
Voiced by: Sakura Nogawa (Japanese); Hunter MacKenzie Austin (English)
Maia's best friend from her Ocean Agency days who got accepted, despite having average grades. She and Maia had made a promise to work with each other.
Tsutomu Hanaoka (花岡 勉, Hanaoka Tsutomu)
Voiced by: Mitsuo Iwata (Japanese); Doug Stone (English)
The inept branch manager of the Nereids Kamchatka branch. He gets pushed around by his female co-workers. Hanaoka has a wife and a daughter Yukari.
Yukari Hanaoka (花岡 ゆかり, Hanaoka Yukari)
Voiced by: Ami Koshimizu (Japanese); Stephanie Sheh (English)
Tsutomu Hanaoka's daughter. She gets displeased with her father's ineptness at times, especially when he lied about being a dashing, bold, detective, but still loves him dearly.
Kōsuke Yagi (八木 浩輔, Yagi Kōsuke)
Voiced by: Hidetoshi Nakamura (Japanese); John Snyder (English)
The chief inspector of the Kamchatka city police force, he gets stressed when it comes to Nereids. One of his biggest burdens is Yu who injured him in the past.
Millie (ミリィ, Mirī)
Voiced by: Junko Noda (Japanese); Karen Strassman (English)
Shizuka's friend (and later Maia's) who is a skilled race car driver. She is inspired by her great-grandmother Ai Mayuzumi (the protagonist of the manga version which is a prequel to this story). Ai was Maia's father's bodyguard.
Wong (ウォン, Won)
Voiced by: Kenji Nomura (Japanese); Patrick Seitz (English)
Son of their mother's fourth husband.
Chang (チャン, Chan)
Voiced by: Shinji Kawada (Japanese); Sam Riegel (English)
Son of their mother's seventh husband.
Lee (リー, Rī)
Voiced by: Tomomichi Nishimura (Japanese); JB Blanc (English)
Son of their mother's second husband and the oldest of the Wong-Chang-Lee brothers.
May (メイ, Mei)
Voiced by: Hitomi Nabatame (Japanese); Kirsten Potter (English)
Sister of the Wong-Chang-Lee brothers (the daughter of their mother's 14th husband). She is more level-headed and comptetent than they are. She is a martial artist and also wants to find the treasure of Elpida, to which end she stole a submarine (which gets repeatedly confiscated by the Nereids and subsequently stolen again by the family). The submarine was named Agnes for their mother. Shizuka renamed it Yomogi-1.
Tony Long (トニー·ロン, Tonī Ron)
Voiced by: Susumu Chiba (Japanese); Liam O'Brien (English)
A mysterious man in sunglasses who can be seen following Maia throughout the series. In episode 22, as he reveals himself to be a member of the Ocean Agencies Security division, charged with protecting her as seen in a few episodes.
Shou Mizuki (水樹 翔, Mizuki Shō)
Shou Mizuki (old) Voiced by: Mugihito (Japanese); Michael Forest (English).
Shou Mizuki (young) Voiced by: Fumihiko Tategi (Japanese); Yuri Lowenthal (English)
Maia's Grandfather who raised her after she awoken from her coma five years ago. He tried to help her regain the memories she lost in the supposedly recent accident that claimed her parents. Shown only in flashbacks, he died right before the first episode. His last word to her, "daphne", refers to a laurel tree in their former home. When Maia uncovered the buried time capsule where the tree once stood in Elpida, Grandpa was revealed to be her big brother. The siblings were placed in hibernation pods over a century ago when their parents and undersea city were quarantined by the Ocean Agency. His pod was found and he was awakened 60 years prior her and he was forced into the government coverup of their prior life. Maia did not age during her slumber.
Yōichi Mizuki (水樹 洋一, Mizuki Yōichi)
Voiced by: Fumihiko Taichiki (Japanese); Bob Papenbrook (English)
Maia's father.
Meiko Mizuki (水樹 美恵子, Mizuki Meiko)
Voiced by: Akiko Hiramatsu (Japanese); Elise Baughman (English)
Maia's mother.

== Media ==
=== Manga ===
The manga version I - Daphne in the Brilliant Blue (アイ〜光と水のダフネ〜, Ai ~Hikari to Mizu no Dafune~) was drawn by manga artist and character designer Satoshi Shiki titled, featured in Young King OURs magazine. The manga story is a prequel to the television series. Shonengahosha published the first volume in 2004. Kodansha published both volumes together in 2008. Tokyopop licensed the manga series for distribution in North America and published an English language 208-page graphic novel "Daphne in the Brilliant Blue" in 2006.

=== Anime ===
The Daphne in the Brilliant Blue (光と水のダフネ, Hikari to Mizu no Dafune) 24-episode anime television series was animated by the studio J.C.Staff and produced by GENCO and broadcast in on TV Kanagawa Japan in 2004. Two additional OVA episodes were also produced but not included with the original Japanese broadcast.

==== Episode list ====
No.	Title	Original release date
1	"Maia's Longest Day (Part 1)"; Transliteration: "Maia no ichiban nagai hi (zenpen)" (Japanese: マイアのいちばん長い日(前編))	January 15, 2004
Maia is having the worst day of her life. She gets rejected by the Ocean Agency, gets kicked out of her house, can't find a job that offers room and board, gets her wallet stolen and gets taken hostage and then shot.
2	"Maia's Longest Day (Part 2)"; Transliteration: "Maia no ichiban nagai hi (kouhen)" (Japanese: マイアのいちばん長い日(後編))	January 22, 2004
Maia is involved in a detainee exchange that goes bad. The housing agency confiscates all her belongs. She joins Nereids, the all-around service provider.
3	"There's No Business Like Nereid's Business"; Transliteration: "Neres hodo suteki na shobai wa nai?" (Japanese: ネレイスほど素敵な商売はない?)	January 29, 2004
Maia and Shizuka solve the mystery of Martin's missing wedding money. Trouble is lying in wait for Rena in the form of a blonde woman.
4	"Chaka Chaka Bang Bang"; Transliteration: "Chakachaka banban" (Japanese: チャカチャカバンバン)	February 5, 2004
Gloria returns to Nereids. She decides to teach Maia how the work should be done.
5	"The Hooligan's Return / Call Me Rough Neck"; Transliteration: "Kaette kita abarenbo" (Japanese: 帰ってきた暴れん坊)	February 12, 2004
Maia is introduced to a martial arts expert named Yu Park. Rena and detective Yagi are taken hostage while on a cruise ship. Yu is reinstated as a Nereids agent after serving 90 days in jail and saving detective Yagi.
6	"The Great Nighttime Manhunt / In the Heat of the Night"; Transliteration: "Yoru no daisosasen" (Japanese: 夜の大捜査戦)	February 19, 2004
Maia gets partnered with Gloria and Yu and discovers the tense relationship they have. Car thieves kidnap Maia as Yu and Gloria are chasing a suspicious truck.
7	"All That, Papa" (Japanese: オール·ザット·パパ)	February 26, 2004
The branch manager's daughter discovers he has been lying to her about his role at work. The gang catches a group of poachers.
8	"Risk Everything For Speed! / The Speeding"; Transliteration: "SPEED ni karada o hare!" (Japanese: スピードに体を張れ!)	March 4, 2004
Maia takes the wheel of a test vehicle when Shizuka's childhood friend, Millie, is injured. Maia gets caught in some industrial espionage.
9	"I'm the Only One Without a Tomorrow / Only I Don't Have Tomorrow"; Transliteration: "ORE Dake ni Ashita ha Nai" (Japanese: オレだけに明日はない)	March 11, 2004
Gloria is told she has a week to live. Tsukasa gets elected to help Gloria meet her ideal man.
10	"Siberian Special Vacation / Siberian Super Vacation!"; Transliteration: "Siberia choutakkyu" (Japanese: シベリア超特休)	March 18, 2004
The girls go to Siberia City where slave traders kidnap Shizuka. Maia has no recollection of being in Siberia before but knows the fastest way to intercept the fleeing kidnappers.
11	"Like this for a Long Visit / The Long Stay!"; Transliteration: "Kakumo nagaki taizai" (Japanese: ｢かくも長き滞在｣)	March 25, 2004
When Maia passes a laurel tree it sparks old memories from her past. Everyone decides to spend an extra day in Siberia looking for clues about Maia's past.
12	"The Day the World Surfaced / The Day Earth Floated Away"; Transliteration: "Sekai ga Fujou Shita Hi" (Japanese: 世界が浮上した日)	April 1, 2004
The 100-year anniversary of the underwater cities raising to the surface is celebrated. The 100-year memorial service for the city of Elpida is also held. Maia, Tsukasa and Millie have a race to show off the Ocean Agency's new hovercraft.
13	"Giving Hatred / Anger's Aweigh"; Transliteration: "Ikari wo Agete" (Japanese: 怒りを上げて)	April 8, 2004
Wong, Chang and Lee along with their rescuer, Mai, seek revenge on Nereids for putting the three brothers in prison. Nereids confiscates the submarine May stole.
14	"The Elderly and UMA / The Old Kook and the Sea"; Transliteration: "Roujin to UMA" (Japanese: 老人とUMA)	April 15, 2004
Since the submarine (Yomogi-1) is just sitting around and costing a fortune, Maia goes out and finds them a job. This job will also double as a training mission for the crew. Maia and an old man go looking for a sea monster. The Yomogi-1 is disguised as a sea monster.
15	"The Great Surge (part 1) / Die Hard, Play Hard (1)"; Transliteration: "Daihadou (1)" (Japanese: 大波動(ダイハドー))	April 29, 2004
A grade-school boy runs away from home and Maia is sent to Siberia to find him. The branch manager in that city holds a grudge against Rena. A mechanic is paid off to sabotage the private jet of a wealthy CEO and then murdered. Terrorists take over the wave negation towers in Kamchatka.
16	"The Great Surge (part 2) / Die Hard, Play Hard (2)"; Transliteration: "Daihadou (2)" (Japanese: 大波動(ダイハドー) 2)	May 6, 2004
Maia and the boy are caught in the plot to kill a wealthy CEO. Rena and Shizuka track down the people behind the plot. Maia must pilot and land the aircraft carrying 1000 passengers in the confines of a very large water holding facility.
17	"Defeated by a Baby / Five Women with Guns and a Baby"; Transliteration: "Aka-chan ni Kanpai" (Japanese: 赤ちゃんに完敗!)	May 13, 2004
Yu finds an abandoned baby at her door. Who would do such a thing? Gloria is against taking the child to the police.
18	"Conflicts Winding Down / Shizuka's Choice"; Transliteration: "Shizuka Naru Kattou" (Japanese: 静香なる葛藤)	May 20, 2004
A con artist plays with Shizuka's heart.
19	"Submarine "Yomogi No. 1" Doesn't Rise to the Surface / The Hunt for Green Yomogi-I"; Transliteration: "Sensuikan yomogi ichigo fujosezu" (Japanese: 潜水艇よもぎ一号浮上せず)	May 27, 2004
May, Wong, Chang and Lee steal the Agnes (their name for the submarine) back. Maia gets taken hostage in an attempt to stop them. Plans for a less than lethal recovery by Nereids goes awry. Maia rescues the treasure hunters from a potentially watery grave... again.
20	"Once upon a time in Siberia / Once Upon a Time in Siberia" (Japanese: ワンス·アポン·ア·タイム·イン·シベリア)	June 3, 2004
The stress of almost certain death in her rescue of the treasure hunters triggered Maia to remember an event from her past. She goes to Siberia to look for the time capsule she and her big brother buried under a laurel tree.
21	"What Happened to Maia? / Whatever Happened to Baby Maia?"; Transliteration: "Nani ga Maia ni okotta?" (Japanese: 何がマイアに起ったか?)	June 10, 2004
Maia is unable to concentrate on her new mission which is to find a girl that has been kidnapped by the slave traders. Shizuka is injured due to Maia's lack of concentration.
22	"Everyday Life of an Eye and Recollection / Terms of Endangerment"; Transliteration: "Ai to kioku no hibi" (Japanese: アイと追憶の日々)	June 17, 2004
A band of slave traders captures Maia. The same traders that the Nereids' raid ruined. Millie and Tony Long, a guy that has appeared watching Maia from the shadows many time in previous episodes, save her. As Maia recovers she dreams of her past in the city of Elpida, Tony confirms Maia is the soul survivor of the city. The Information Division of the Ocean Agency then kidnaps Maia to insure she can say nothing about past events.
23	"Escape From Kamchatka" (Japanese: エスケープ·フロム·カムチャッカ)	June 24, 2004
Maia is told the reason behind her false memories. Tony tells the girls of Nereids about Maia's capture. Shizuka, Yu and Gloria quit Nereids on account of Rena's apparent cold-heartedness. Tsukasa returns from Greenland City and is immediately taken by Shizuka to help rescue Maia from the Ocean Agency.
24	"Daphne In The Brilliant Blue"; Transliteration: "Hikari to mizu no Daphne" (Japanese: 光と水のダフネ)	July 3, 2004
Kevin forwards the coordinates of Elpida to the Yomogi-1. Tony gives May, Wong, Chang and Lee the use of an attack sub. The Ocean Agency trails the Yomogi-1 to Elpida. While the treasure hunters chase off the Ocean Agency's pursuit vehicle, Maia descends into the shell of the city proper. Once inside memories flood her mind. Suddenly she recalls the outbreak from the biological facility. She finds the time capsule she and her brother buried and then realizes the person that raised her as her grandfather was really her older brother. In the end, Maia chooses to stay.with Nereids rather than joining the Ocean Agency again.

=== Original video animation ===
No.	Title	Original release date
25	"Everything You Always Wanted To Know About Nereids (But Were Afraid To Ask)"	TBA
The ladies make a PR video.
26	"Heaven Can Wait For Maia Mizuki"	TBA
While helping Gloria on a freelance job, Gloria and Maia switch bodies.

== Reception ==
Several of the individual DVD releases as well as the collections have received generally positive reviews. Carl Kimlinger reviewed Collection 1 awarding grades from "C" (story) to "B" (art & music) giving a "+: for its good sense of humor and a sympathetic lead and "−" for "not-so-good everything else", noting that "a high fan-service tolerance is necessary". Theron Martin reviewed Collection 2 awarding grades from "C" (animation) to "B" (art & music) giving a "+ as it "can be quite entertaining" and "−" for "stale ideas and distractingly outrageous costume designs".

== See also ==
- List of underwater science fiction works
