= The New York Times Manga Best Sellers of 2013 =

This is a list of manga that topped The New York Times Manga Best Seller list in 2013.

Date	Book	Author	Publisher
January 6	Maximum Ride, Vol. 6	James Patterson	Yen Press
January 13	Maximum Ride, Vol. 6	James Patterson	Yen Press
January 20	Maximum Ride, Vol. 6	James Patterson	Yen Press
January 27	Bleach, Vol. 54	Tite Kubo	Viz Media
February 3	Missions of Love, Vol. 2	Ema Toyama	Kodansha Comics
February 10	Black Butler, Vol. 12	Yana Toboso	Yen Press
February 17	Sailor Moon, Vol. 9	Naoko Takeuchi	Kodansha Comics
February 24	Naruto, Vol. 60	Masashi Kishimoto	Viz Media
March 3	Skip Beat, Vol. 30	Yoshiki Nakamura	Viz Media
March 10	Naruto, Vol. 60	Masashi Kishimoto	Viz Media
March 17	Battle Angel Alita: Last Order, Vol. 17	Yukito Kishiro	Kodansha Comics
March 24	Rosario+Vampire; Season II, Vol. 11	Akihisa Ikeda	Viz Media
March 31	One Piece, Vol. 66	Eiichiro Oda	Viz Media
April 7	Yu-Gi-Oh! Zexal, Vol. 2	Kazuki Takahashi	Viz Media
April 14	Sailor Moon, Vol. 10	Naoko Takeuchi	Kodansha Comics
April 21	Sailor Moon, Vol. 10	Naoko Takeuchi	Kodansha Comics
April 28	Bleach, Vol. 56	Tite Kubo	Viz Media
May 5	Bleach, Vol. 56	Tite Kubo	Viz Media
May 12	Black Butler, Vol. 13	Yana Toboso	Yen Press
May 19	Negima Magister Negi Magi, Vol. 38	Ken Akamatsu	Kodansha Comics
May 26	Naruto, Vol. 61	Masashi Kishimoto	Viz Media
June 2	Naruto, Vol. 61	Masashi Kishimoto	Viz Media
June 9	Sailor Moon, Vol. 11	Naoko Takeuchi	Kodansha Comics
June 16	Sailor Moon, Vol. 11	Naoko Takeuchi	Kodansha Comics
June 23	Yu-Gi-Oh! Zexal, Vol. 3	Kazuki Takahashi	Viz Media
June 30	Yu-Gi-Oh! Zexal, Vol. 3	Kazuki Takahashi	Viz Media
July 7	One Piece, Vol. 67	Eiichiro Oda	Viz Media
July 14	Mobile Suit Gundam: The Origin, Vol. 2	Yoshikazu Yasuhiko	Vertical
July 21	Bleach, Vol. 57	Tite Kubo	Viz Media
July 28	Blue Exorcist, Vol. 10	Kazue Kato	Viz Media
August 4	Sailor Moon, Vol. 12	Naoko Takeuchi	Kodansha Comics
August 11	Sailor Moon, Vol. 12	Naoko Takeuchi	Kodansha Comics
August 18	Black Butler, Vol. 14	Yana Toboso	Yen Press
August 25	Naruto, Vol. 62	Masashi Kishimoto	Viz Media
September 1	Naruto, Vol. 62	Masashi Kishimoto	Viz Media
September 8	Naruto, Vol. 62	Masashi Kishimoto	Viz Media
September 15	Naruto, Vol. 62	Masashi Kishimoto	Viz Media
September 22	One Piece, Vol. 68	Eiichiro Oda	Viz Media
September 29	Sailor Moon Short Stories, Vol. 1	Naoko Takeuchi	Kodansha Comics
October 6	Sailor Moon Short Stories, Vol. 1	Naoko Takeuchi	Kodansha Comics
October 13	Mobile Suit Gundam: The Origin, Vol. 3	Yoshikazu Yasuhiko	Vertical
October 20	Bleach, Vol. 58	Tite Kubo	Viz Media
October 27	Attack on Titan, Vol. 1	Hajime Isayama	Kodansha Comics
November 3	Monster Musume, Vol. 1	Okayado	Seven Seas Entertainment
November 10	Monster Musume, Vol. 1	Okayado	Seven Seas Entertainment
November 17	Black Butler, Vol. 15	Yana Toboso	Yen Press
November 24	Yu-Gi-Oh! 5D's, Vol. 5	Masahiro Hikokubo	Viz Media
December 1	Yu-Gi-Oh! 5D's, Vol. 5	Masahiro Hikokubo	Viz Media
December 8	Yotsuba&!, Vol. 12	Kiyohiko Azuma	Yen Press
December 15	Sailor Moon Short Stories, Vol. 2	Naoko Takeuchi	Kodansha Comics
December 22	One Piece, Vol. 69	Eiichiro Oda	Viz Media
December 29	One Piece, Vol. 69	Eiichiro Oda	Viz Media

== See also ==
- The New York Times Fiction Best Sellers of 2013
- The New York Times Non-Fiction Best Sellers of 2013
