= Yebisu Celebrities =

Japanese manga series

YEBISUセレブリティーズ (YEBISU Sereburitīzu)
- Genre: Yaoi
- Manga
- Written by: Kaoru Iwamoto
- Illustrated by: Shinri Fuwa
- Published by: Biblos (former); Libre (current)
- English publisher: NA: Sublime (digital)
- Imprint: B-Boy Novels
- Magazine: Magazine Be × Boy
- Original run: May 10, 2004 – May 19, 2008
- Volumes: 6
- Adaptations
- Yebisu Celebrities 1st (OVA, 2010); Drama CDs released by Cue Egg and Marine Entertainment (2004–2009)

Yebisu Celebrities (Japanese: YEBISUセレブリティーズ, Hepburn: YEBISU Sereburitīzu) is a Japanese manga series written by Kaoru Iwamoto and illustrated by Shinri Fuwa. It was published in six volumes from May 2004 to May 2008. Viz Media's Sublime imprint is publishing the series digitally in English.

== Summary ==
The manga and OVA is set at a graphic design firm called Yebisu Graphics, where only the most experienced, best looking, and top-notch workers are accepted. The franchise starts with Haruka Fujinami, a working-class college student who gets a job working for Yebisu under the direct authority of his new boss, the firm and domineering Takashi Daijō, who Haruka at first felt uneasy around until he soon discovers his newfound feelings and his boss's attraction towards him.

== Media ==
=== Manga ===
The series is written by Kaoru Iwamoto and illustrated by Shinri Fuwa. It was serialized in Magazine Be × Boy, and later published in volumes by Biblos under their B-Boy imprint, with the first volume being released on May 10, 2004. After Biblos' bankruptcy, the series was acquired by Libre. Two side-stories were also released. In 2009, the series was temporarily removed from Amazon's search results.

In November 2005, Central Park Media's imprint Be Beautiful announced they licensed the series for English publication. After Central Park Media's bankruptcy, Viz Media's Sublime imprint announced they licensed the series digitally in 2011.

==== Volume list ====
No.	Original release date	Original ISBN	English release date	English ISBN
1	November 1, 2006	978-4-86-263062-9	March 30, 2012	978-1-42-154985-9
2	December 1, 2006	978-4-86-263077-3	June 26, 2012	978-1-42-154986-6
3	December 19, 2006	978-4-86-263075-9	September 25, 2012	978-1-42-155171-5
4	July 19, 2006	978-4-86-263001-8	December 18, 2012	978-1-42-155172-2
5	November 19, 2007	978-4-86-263282-1	March 26, 2013	978-1-42-155173-9
6	May 19, 2008	978-4-86-263387-3	—	—

=== Animated adaptations ===
An original video animation (OVA) adaption, titled Yebisu Celebrities 1st, was released on DVD by Movic on May 28, 2010. It was directed by Koichi Kikuchi and ran for 44 minutes.

An adaptation of the manga where only the mouths are animated and voice acting added, called an "animix", was made to be used as a demonstration for a similar product for Finder.

=== Drama CDs ===
Several drama CD adaptations have been released. The first on October 28, 2004, by Biblos' Cue Egg Label. The final one in the series was released by Libre on June 24, 2009. Another drama CD adaptation was produced by Marine Entertainment and released on June 22, 2007.

== Reception ==
Connie from Slightly Biased Manga criticized the manga for some of its side characters and plots feeling more interesting than the main ones, overall calling it "a little disappointing". Manga News also criticized it, stating it is "unoriginal" and "has no substance".
