= Lover's Pledge =

Japanese Comic book - Manga

恋は契約のあとで (Koi wa Keiyaku no Ato de)
- Genre: Romance, Yaoi
- Manga
- Written by: Kae Maruya
- Published by: Tokuma Shoten
- English publisher: NA: Digital Manga Publishing
- Imprint: Chara Selection
- Published: April 25, 2005

Lover's Pledge (Japanese: 恋は契約のあとで, Hepburn: Koi wa Keiyaku no Atode) is a 2005 yaoi manga written and illustrated by Kae Maruya. It is licensed in English by Digital Manga Publishing, which released the manga on 21 October 2008. It is licensed in German by Carlsen Comics, under the title Love Contract.

== Reception ==
Leroy Douresseaux describes the manga as "passionately romantic", and praised the author's characterisation and artwork. Patricia Beard felt that experienced readers would find some stories familiar. Holly Ellingwood described it as "the perfect yaoi for fans of happy endings".
