= A Gentleman's Kiss =

Japanese manga series

- Cover of the first volume of A Gentleman's Kiss as published by Tokuma Shoten

爪先にキス (Tsumasaki ni Kiss)
- Genre: Yakuza, Yaoi
- Manga
- Written by: Shinri Fuwa
- Published by: Tokuma Shoten
- English publisher: NA: Digital Manga Publishing
- Magazine: Chara Selection
- Original run: August 25, 2005 – April 25, 2006
- Volumes: 2

A Gentleman's Kiss (Japanese: 爪先にキス, Hepburn: Tsumasaki ni Kiss) is a Japanese manga written and illustrated by Shinri Fuwa. First serialized in Chara Selection, the manga was later adapted and released in North America by Digital Manga Publishing. The adaptation received mostly positive reception by reviewers.

== Plot ==
Homura Yasobe is a young, successful businessman who seems to have it all: good looks, wealth, and a future as the head of his father's Yakuza faction. However, he's in a secret relationship with Touji Karasuma, the fierce and ambitious heir to a rival gang. Despite the immense risks involved, the two continue their forbidden romance, setting the stage for a story that blends elements of Romeo and Juliet with the perilous world of the Yakuza.

== Release ==
A Gentleman's Kiss was first published in the Japanese manga magazine Chara Selection from August 25, 2005, to April 25, 2006. The manga series was adapted into English, and released in North America by Digital Manga Publishing. Both volumes were released between August, and November 2008. In addition to the two volume series, a Drama CD was also released in April 2006.

== Reception ==
Danielle Van Gorder from Mania.com described the art as "interesting, bold and very assured", and felt that although the story had many cliches, it was "executed well enough" to make it feel fresh. Van Gorder felt that in places, the characterisation was too subtle. Rachel Bentham, writing for Active Anime, enjoyed the art and story, saying that the "men are handsome, the romance dangerous". Katherine Farmar, writing for Comics Village, compared the premise to Romeo and Juliet, but appreciated that this was only the premise, and that the story became more complex with a love triangle with "uncertainty and ambiguity". Leroy Douresseaux of Comic Book Bin enjoyed the lack of a seme-uke dynamic, and enjoyed the stubborn strength of the characters.
