= List of Oricon number-one manga of 2016 =

The following is a list of Oricon number-one manga of 2016. A chart with the best selling manga in Japan is published weekly by Oricon. This list includes the manga that reached the number one place on that chart in 2016.

== Chart history ==
Issue date	Date	Title	Author	Publisher	Copies	Reference
January 5	December 22–28	One Piece, 80	Eiichiro Oda	Shueisha	273,824	
