= Chara (magazine) =

Japanese gay manga magazine

- Categories: Yaoi, Shōjo
- Frequency: Bimonthly
- Publisher: Tokuma Shoten
- First issue: 1994
- Country: Japan
- Based in: Tokyo
- Language: Japanese
- Website: Chara

Chara (Japanese: Charaの本棚) is a Japanese bi-monthly Yaoi/Shōjo manga magazine published by Tokuma Shoten. First released in 1994, the magazine has since been adapted into two different spinoffs.

== History ==
Chara was first published in 1994 as an offshoot of Animage. In the 22nd issue of Chara, it was announced that a split-off magazine entitled "Chara Selection" would co-circulate. Later on, another split-off entitled Char@ was made. The website for Chara was designed by C&S Design in 2014.

== Notable published works ==
=== Chara ===
- Clear Skies! (毎日晴天!, Mainichi Seiten!)
- Interview with the Vampire (Manga adaptation)
- Legend of the Galactic Heroes (銀河英雄伝説, Ginga Eiyū Densetsu) (Golden Wings)
- Merry checker
- Skyscrapers of Oz (オズの摩天楼, Oz no Matenrou)
- Voice or Noise (ボイス・オア・ノイズ, Boisu oa Noizu)
- Wild Adapter (ワイルドアダプター, Wairudo Adaputā)
- My Beautiful Man (manga adaptation)

=== Chara Selection ===
- A Gentleman's Kiss (爪先にキス, Tsumasaki ni Kiss)
- Crimson Spell (クリムゾン・スぺル, Kurimuzon Superu)
- Lover's Pledge (恋は契約のあとで, Koi wa Keiyaku no Atode)
