= Maiden Rose =

Japanese manga series

- Juné's cover for the US edition of Volume 1

百日の薔薇 (Hyakujitsu no Bara)
- Manga
- Written by: Fusanosuke Inariya
- Published by: Oakla Publishing
- English publisher: NA: Digital Manga Publishing
- Original run: 2005 – present
- Volumes: 5
- Original video animation
- Directed by: Hidefumi Takagi
- Produced by: Yuuichi Ishizu; Yuuki Morishita (1)
- Written by: Yuki Enatsu (Studio Live)
- Music by: Masaaki Mori
- Studio: Prime Time
- Released: May 29, 2009 – October 23, 2009
- Runtime: 24 minutes
- Episodes: 2

Maiden Rose (百日の薔薇, Hyakujitsu no Bara) is a Japanese manga series written and illustrated by Fusanosuke Inariya. It is licensed in English by Digital Manga Publishing, but was previously licensed by DramaQueen. Digital Manga Publishing released vol. 1 on May 18, 2010.

A two-episode original video animation adaptation based on the first volume of the series was released on May 29, 2009, with Taki Reizen played by Susumu Chiba and Klaus von Wolfstadt played by Kazuhiko Inoue and October 23, 2009.

Geneon released a drama CD for the first volume on June 29, 2007.

The story takes place in a fictional world that has just begun a great world war. Klaus von Wolfstadt, from one of the nations of the "Western Alliance", has left his duty as a soldier to his nation in order to be a knight to Taki Reizen, commander of the 15th division "Rozen Maiden" whose country has an alliance with "Eurote", an enemy of the Western Alliance. The story follows their romance as it evolves from friendship to love, battling mistrust, doubt and anger before solidifying in an unshakable bond. At every turn their relationship is tried and tested, battered by both enemies abroad and those at home as they struggle with their own feelings for one another.

== Plot ==
Klaus von Wolfstadt met Taki Reizen in 1918. Klaus and his family (parents, brother and sister) visited the Far Eastern country to attend the coronation ceremony. After having gotten lost in the gardens surrounding the area, he stumbled upon a young Taki, who asked him to help him pick some flowers from one of the trees above them to place them on his ceremonial headgear. Klaus agreed, and after picking the flowers for Taki, Taki asked Klaus if he would give himself to him and be his knight.

Nine years later, Taki and Klaus met again at Luckenwalde Military Academy, where Taki had gone to learn how to operate tanks. Klaus was given orders to befriend Taki, and both observe and protect him. Through the course of the year, the two fell in love. When Eurote broke a treaty with the Western Alliance and invaded Dheedene, Taki was ordered to be deported back to his country. The night after he was ordered to be sent home, he and Klaus had their first romantic encounter.

A few days later, they met at Luckenwalde station, and rode on a train heading back to Taki's country. During the train ride home, Klaus nearly took Taki's purity, in a moment of passion. However, Taki, being a member of the Reizen family which is favored by the Gods, has the burden of remaining celibate until marriage. Considering the consequences on himself and on the people who believe in him, Taki ended his relationship with Klaus, but only after Klaus was sworn to him as his knight. This binds the two together for the rest of their lives.

Now the two have to fight in both the war between Taki's country and the Western Alliance, and the war between each other.

== Reception ==
Katherine Farmar of Comics Village felt that although she should object to some aspects of the manga, she was "swept along" by it instead, enjoying it immensely. She found the use of flashbacks added depth to the work, and praised the art and emotional complexity of the work. Michelle Smith of Pop Culture Shock found the manga "promising" and "confusing", cautioning that it is "not for the faint of heart". Authors such as Fusanosuke Inariya (of Maiden Rose fame) utilize rape not as the traditional romantic catalyst, but as a tragic dramatic plot element, rendering her stories a subversion of contemporary tropes that reinforce and reflect older tropes such as the prevalence of romantic tragedy themes. Other yaoi tend to depict a relationship that begins as non-consensual and evolves into a consensual relationship. However, Fusanosuke's stories are ones where the characters' relationship begins as consensual and devolves into non-consensual, often due to external societal pressures that label the character's homosexual relationship as deviant. Her stories are still characterized by fantasy, yet they do brutally and realistically illustrate scenes of sexual assault between characters.
