= Crimson Spell =

Japanese manga series

- First English edition of Crimson Spell, published by Kitty Media on July 18, 2007

クリムゾン・スぺル (Kurimuzon Superu)
- Genre: Action, high fantasy, boys' love
- Manga
- Written by: Ayano Yamane
- Published by: Tokuma Shoten
- English publisher: NA: SuBLime
- Imprint: Chara Comics
- Magazine: Chara Selection
- Original run: 2004 – 2021
- Volumes: 7

Crimson Spell (Japanese: クリムゾン・スぺル, Hepburn: Kurimuzon Superu; originally released as The Crimson Spell in English) is a Japanese manga series written and illustrated by Ayano Yamane. It was serialized in the monthly manga magazine Chara Selection from 2004 to 2021.

== Plot ==
Vald, the prince of Alsvieth, is forced by circumstance to use his family's cursed sword, and so he seeks out the services of Halvir, a sorcerer, to help him lift the curse in exchange for the sword. The curse is unknown to Vald, but it manifests itself as turning Vald into a bloodthirsty and lustful demon at night. Halvir subdues the demon by having sex with it, and when Vald awakes, he remembers nothing. Throughout the manga, Vald and Halvir meet several new allies that accompany them in trying to defeat Vald's curse.

== Characters ==
Valdrigr Alsvieth (バルドリーグ・アルスヴィーズ, Barudorīgu Arusuvīzu)
Voiced by: Takashi Kondō (drama CD)
Known as Vald (バルド, Barudo) for short, he is the Prince of Alsvieth and under a curse which transforms him into a demon. Leaving his kingdom to search for a cure, the prince meets the wizard, Halvir Hroptr who can tame the beast in his passionate embrace.
Halvir Hropter (ハルヴィル・フロプト, Haruviru Furoputo)
Voiced by: Shin-ichiro Miki (drama CD)
Known as Havi (ハヴィ) for short, he is a wizard who helps Prince Vald tame the beast of his soul by his touch. Searching together for a cure to end the curse that the prince is under, they encounter many adventures on their journey, falling in love in the process.
Liethregveel (リーズレグベール, Rīzuregubēru)
Voiced by: Kōki Miyata (drama CD)
A legendary beast that was an apprentice to a powerful magician. He was rumored to have the ability to level an entire forest with a single breath. He can take two forms, a bunny-like character, and a beautiful young man. Whether in human or bunny form, he keeps the curly symbol on his forehead and his braid. He is very fond of Prince Vald, who named him Rulca (ルルカ, Ruruka) but has a frosty relationship with the wizard, Havi.
Halceles (ハルセレス, Haruseresu)
Voiced by: Hiroki Yasumoto (drama CD)
One of Celeasdiele's Wizard School's professors and Halvir's former teacher when he was 12 years old. Before the story, he caught in a time-bubble for 10 years and was freed by Halvir.
Halrein (ハルレイン, Harurein)
Voiced by: Hirofumi Nojima (drama CD)
A magician and one of the protectors of Celeasdeile, he's known Havi since childhood when they learned magic together. He joins Prince Vald's traveling group when he is ordered by the Grand Council of Celeasdeile to find Havi.

== Media ==
=== Manga ===
Crimson Spell is written and illustrated by Ayano Yamane. It was serialized in monthly manga magazine Chara Selection from 2004 until 2021. The chapters were released in 7 bound volumes by Tokuma Shoten under the Chara Comics imprint.

In August 2006, Media Blasters announced they had licensed the series in English for North American distribution, releasing the first two volumes under the title The Crimson Spell through their Kitty Media imprint. In May 2013, Viz Media took over English distribution rights and re-released the series under its original title through their SuBLime imprint. The series was given a print release only, as Viz Media could not acquire digital distribution rights.

No.	Original release date	Original ISBN	English release date	English ISBN
1	July 25, 2005	978-4-19-960292-4	July 18, 2007 (Kitty Media); December 10, 2013 (SuBLime)	978-1-59-883104-7 (Kitty Media); 978-4-34-483386-9 (SuBLime)
2	March 24, 2007	978-4-19-960339-6	August 1, 2008 (Kitty Media); February 11, 2014 (SuBLime)	978-1-59-883291-4 (Kitty Media); 978-4-34-483386-9 (SuBLime)
3	March 25, 2009	978-4-19-960401-0	April 8, 2014 (SuBLime)	978-1-42-156423-4 (SuBLime)
4	November 25, 2010	978-4-19-960457-7	June 10, 2014 (SuBLime)	978-1-42-156424-1 (SuBLime)
5	March 5, 2013	978-4-19-960546-8	August 12, 2014 (SuBLime)	978-1-42-156765-5 (SuBLime)
6	August 25, 2018	978-4-19-960764-6	July 9, 2019 (SuBLime)	978-1-97-470789-8 (SuBLime)
7	June 25, 2021	978-4-19-960872-8	April 8, 2025 (SuBLime)	978-1-97-473213-5 (SuBLime)

=== Drama CDs ===
Movic produced two audio drama adaptations of the first two volumes and released them on CD under the Chara CD Collection imprint. The first CD, adapting volume 1 of the manga, was released on June 24, 2009, and peaked at #156 on the Oricon Weekly Albums Chart on its first week of release. The second CD, adapting volume 2 of the manga, was released on March 25, 2010, peaking at #274 on the Oricon Weekly Albums Chart on its first week of release.

== Reception ==
Julie Rosato of Mania.com criticizes the first chapter for rushing "things a bit". Holly Ellingwood of Active Anime commends the manga for going "beyond the average yaoi to give readers a truly immersing fantasy world". She also comments on the "scorching and beautifully drawn" love scenes".

In the United States, SuBLime's translation of volume 3 debuted at #2 on The New York Times Best Seller List in the manga category, while volumes 4 and 5 debuted at #1.
