= Satoshi Shiki =

Japanese manga artist and illustrator

Satoshi Shiki 士貴智志
- Areas: Manga artist, illustrator
- Notable works: Kami-Kaze, Daphne in the Brilliant Blue, Attack on Titan: Before the Fall

Satoshi Shiki (士貴智志, Shiki Satoshi) is a Japanese manga artist and illustrator, whose works include Kami-Kaze and Riot. He's also an artist of hentai manga, and this influence can be seen even in his non-hentai works like Kami-Kaze and Daphne in the Brilliant Blue. He worked on XBlade in the magazine Monthly Shōnen Sirius, and then illustrated the manga adaptation of Attack on Titan: Before the Fall, a light novel that acts as a prequel to the Attack on Titan manga series, also serialized at Monthly Shōnen Sirius.

== Works ==
Title	Year	Notes	Refs
Riot (ライオット)	1993–94 (vol.)	New type 100% Comics, 2 vols.	
Kami-Kaze (神・風)	1997–2003	Serialized in Monthly Afternoon; Published by Kodansha, 7 vols.	
Riot of the World (Riot of the world公開死刑宣告, Raiotto of the world kōkai shikei senkoku; lit. 'Riot of the World: Public Death Sentence')	1998–2000 (vol.)	Young jump favorite book / Ultra YJC, 3 vols.	
Minminminto (みんみんミント, Minmin Mint)	2000–02	Serialized in Afternoon Season Zōkan, 1 vol.	
Daphne in the Brilliant Blue	2004–08	Serialized in Young King OURs; Published by Shōnen Gahosha, 1 vol.	
Pen & Ink guide to penning and inking manga Book, with Yasuhiro Nightow and Oh! great	2006	Published by Digital Manga	
Xblade; Manga, Original by Idatatsuhiko	2007–11 (vol.)	Sirius KC, 12 vols.	
Ai (アイ, Eye)	2008 (vol.)	Sirius KC, 2 vols.	
Xblade + Cross; Manga, Original by Idatatsuhiko	2011–13 (vol.)	Serialized in Monthly Shonen Sirius; Published by Kodansha, 8 vols.	
Genjū suwa (幻獣坐, Sitting phantom beast); Manga, Original by Mikumo Gakuto	2011–12 (vol.)	Rival KC, 3 vols.	
Betsu Ani! (べつあに!, Distinction brother!)	2012 (vol.)	ID Comics / Zero-sum comics, 1 vol.	
Persona × Detective Naoto (ペルソナ×探偵NAOTO); Manga, Original story by Natsuki Mamiya and Atlus	2012–14	Serialized in Dengeki Maoh; Published by ASCII Media Works, 2 vols.	
Attack on Titan: Before the Fall; Illustrator. Written by Ryo Suzukaze, Character design by Thores Shibamoto, Original story by Hajime Isayama,	2013–19	Serialized in Monthly Shonen Sirius; Published by Kodansha, 17 vols.	
The Legend of Dororo and Hyakkimaru (どろろと百鬼丸伝, Dororo to Hyakkimaruden); Manga, Original story by Osamu Tezuka	2018–	Serialized in Champion Red; Published by Akita Shoten, 4 vols.	
