= Attack on Titan: Before the Fall =

Japanese light novels series

- The cover of the first light novel volume

進撃の巨人 Before the fall (Shingeki no Kyojin Before the fall)
- Light novel
- Written by: Ryō Suzukaze
- Illustrated by: THORES Shibamoto
- Published by: Kodansha
- English publisher: NA: Vertical
- Imprint: Kodansha Ranobe Bunko
- Original run: December 2, 2011 – June 29, 2012
- Volumes: 3
- Manga
- Written by: Ryō Suzukaze
- Illustrated by: Satoshi Shiki
- Published by: Kodansha
- English publisher: US: Kodansha USA
- Magazine: Monthly Shōnen Sirius
- Original run: August 26, 2013 – March 26, 2019
- Volumes: 17
- icon

Attack on Titan: Before the Fall (進撃の巨人 Before the fall, Shingeki no Kyojin: Before the Fall) is a series of Japanese light novels written by Ryō Suzukaze and illustrated by THORES Shibamoto. The three novels were published from December 2011 to June 2012. The series is a prequel to Hajime Isayama's Attack on Titan manga series.

A manga adaptation by Satoshi Shiki was serialized between 2013 and 2019.

== Plot ==
The series is set 70 years before the events of Attack on Titan, and is divided into two parts: the first focuses on Angel Aaltonen, the developer of the Vertical Maneuvering Equipment; the second part follows the life of Kuklo, a boy who was found as a baby in a pile of Titan vomit, having been birthed by one of the Titan's victims after they were eaten. He is labelled the "Titan's son" and imprisoned for many of his younger years, before being freed by his owner's daughter, Sharle, and eventually joining the Survey Corps.

== Media ==
=== Light novel ===
The series of light novels is written by Ryō Suzukaze, with illustrations by THORES Shibamoto. Three volumes were released between 2011 and 2012. It serves as a prequel to the Attack on Titan manga series, written and illustrated by Hajime Isayama.

The series was licensed in North America by Vertical, who published the first volume in summer 2014, followed by the second and third volumes in a 2-in-1 omnibus format in summer 2015. Attack on Titan: Before the Fall first volume is named Attack on Titan: Before the Fall, second volume is Marching Giants and the third volume is Kuklo Unbound. The English version combines volumes 2 and 3 into Kuklo Unbound.

==== Volumes ====
No.	Original release date	Original ISBN	English release date	English ISBN
1	December 2, 2011	978-4-06-375202-1	September 16, 2014	978-1-939130-86-0
2	March 30, 2012	978-4-06-375228-1	May 26, 2015	978-1-939130-87-7
3	June 29, 2012	978-4-06-375243-4	May 26, 2015	978-1-939130-87-7

=== Manga ===
A manga adaptation, written by Suzukaze and illustrated by Satoshi Shiki, was published in Kodansha's Monthly Shōnen Sirius magazine from August 26, 2013 to March 26, 2019, and was collected in seventeen volumes. The series received a special chapter in the May issue of Monthly Shōnen Sirius on March 25, 2014.

Kodansha USA announced in October 2013 that it had licensed the series, and released it in North America from March 2014 to August 2019.

==== Volumes ====
No.	Original release date	Original ISBN	English release date	English ISBN
1	December 9, 2013	978-4-06-376439-0	March 11, 2014	978-1-61262-910-0
1. "The Titan's Son" (巨人の子, Kyojin no Ko); 2. "Her Determination" (覚悟の少女, Kakugo no Shōjo); 3. "Moonlit Oath" (月下の約束, Gekka no Yakusoku); "Trailer"
2	April 9, 2014	978-4-06-376460-4	August 19, 2014	978-1-61262-912-4
4. "Stormy Night" (嵐の夜, Arashi no Yoru); 5. "Predawn Departure" (未明の出立, Mimei no Shuttatsu); 6. "Proof of Humanity" (人間の証明, Ningen no Shōmei); 7. "The Freshly Blood-Soaked Earth" (鮮血の大地, Senketsu no Daichi)
3	August 8, 2014	978-4-06-376486-4	December 9, 2014	978-1-61262-914-8
8. "Predatory Cycle" (捕食の構図, Hoshoku no Kōzu); 9. "The Crimson Tower" (紅蓮の巨塔, Guren no Kyotō); 10. "The Unicorn's Plight" (一角獣の陥穽, Yunikōn no Kansei); "Carlo Pikale's Expedition Report" (カルロ・ピケール 遠征報告, Karuro Pikēru Repōto)
4	December 9, 2014	978-4-06-376515-1	March 31, 2015	978-1-61262-981-0
11. "Serendipity Behind Bars" (獄中の奇縁, Gokuchū no Kien); 12. "The Killing Fields" (刑戮の荒野, Keiriku no Kōya); 13. "Left for Dead" (苟且の死者, Kōsho no Shisha); "Sharle's Shiganshina Diary" (シャルルのシガンシナ日誌, Sharuru no Shiganshina Nisshi)
5	April 9, 2015	978-4-06-376537-3	August 25, 2015	978-1-61262-982-7
14. "Visitors to the Industrial City" (工場都市の来者, Kōjō Toshi no Raisha); 15. "Visions of the Future" (幻視の未来, Genshi no Mirai); 16. "Thicket of Iron Bamboo" (黑金の竹林, Kurogane no Chikurin); 17. "The Corps Collapses" (潰乱の兵団, Kairan no Heidan)
6	August 7, 2015	978-4-06-376564-9	December 29, 2015	978-1-63236-224-7
18. "Bacchanalia of Greed" (強欲の狂宴, Gōyoku no Kyōen); 19. "Oath in the Bamboo Thicket" (竹林の誓い, Chikurin no Chikai); 20. "The Quickening of Ambition" (野望の胎動, Yabō no Taidō); "The Recruit's First Mission" (或る新兵の初陣, Aru Shinpei no Uijin); "The Girl Waiting in the Workshop" (工房で待つ少女, Kōbō de Matsu Shōjo)
7	December 9, 2015	978-4-06-376590-8	April 12, 2016	978-1-63236-225-4
21. "Den of Treachery" (詭謀の栖, Kibō no Su); 22. "Abyss Below the Wall" (壁下の深淵, Hekika no Shin'en); 23. "Rondo of Darkness" (闇の輪舞, Yami no Rinbu); 24. "Wail from the Shadows" (晦冥の鬼哭, Kaimei no Kikoku); "Swear upon Wall Maria" (ウォール・マリアに誓う, Wōru Maria ni Chikau)
8	April 8, 2016	978-4-06-390619-6	August 9, 2016	978-1-63236-260-5
25. "Before The Storm" (嵐の前, Arashi no Mae); 26. "The Fires of Upheaval" (動乱の炎, Dōran no Honō); 27. "The Rivalry's Outcome" (相克の行方, Sōkoku no Yukue); 28. "Dense Space" (堅緻の空隙, Kenchi no Kūgeki); "Master of Vertical Maneuvering" (立体機動の師, Rittai Kidō no Shi)
9	August 9, 2016	978-4-06-390641-7	December 13, 2016	978-1-63236-320-6
29. "Disturbance in the City" (擾乱の都市, Jōran no Toshi); 30. "Fallout of Rebellion (逆乱の果て, Gekiran no Hate); 31. "Blades of Karma" (宿縁の双剣, Shukuen no Sōken); 32. "Caged Ball" (籠中の夜宴, Kochū no Yaen); "Budding Ambition" (野望の萌芽, Yabō no Hōga)
10	December 9, 2016	978-4-06-390667-7	April 18, 2017	978-1-63236-381-7
33. "The Imprisoned Princess Flees" (遁逃の籠姫, Tontō no Kago Hime); 34. "Town of Eternal Night" (常夜の街, Tokoyo no Machi); 35. "Lone Shadow in the Town That Never Sleeps" (不夜街の孤影, Fu Yagai no Koei); 36. "Craftsmen of Yore" (職人達の昔日, Shokunin-tachi no Sekijitsu); "Greater Intimacy Through Self-Defense" (護身術で大接近, Goshin-jutsu de dai Sekkin)
11	April 7, 2017	978-4-06-390696-7	August 8, 2017	978-1-63236-382-4
37. "Sacrificial Cage" (贄の檻, Nie no Ori); 38. "Warrior of Vengeance" (復仇の戦士, Fukkyū no Senshi); 39. "Succession of the Dream" (夢の承継, Yume no Shōkei); 40. "Cottage Meeting" (陋屋の集い, Rōya no Tsudoi)
12	August 9, 2017	978-4-06-390725-4	December 26, 2017	978-1-63236-383-1
41. "Cornerstone of the Corps" (兵団の礎, Heidan no Ishizue); 42. "Traveling Skies" (旅の空, Tabi no Sora); 43. "Wellspring of the Restoration" (再起の濫觴, Saiki no Ranshō); 44. "Long-Awaited Weapon" (翹望の戎具, Gyōbō no Jūgu)
13	December 8, 2017	978-4-06-510504-7	April 3, 2018	978-1-63236-536-1
45. "Wings of the Bulwark" (干城の翼, Kanjō no Tsubasa); 46. "Corps Crossroads" (岐路の兵団, Kiro no Heidan); 47. "Harbinger of Upheaval" (波瀾の来訪, Haran no Raihō); 48. "The Reason I Fight" (戦いの理由, Tatakai no Riyū)
14	April 9, 2018	978-4-06-511218-2	August 21, 2018	978-1-63236-614-6
49. "Beyond the Boundary" (境界の外, Kyōkai no soto); 50. "Labyrinth of the Demon's Womb" (鬼胎の迷宮, Kitai no Meikyū); 51. "Vast Silhouette's Fetters" (巨影の枷鎖, Kyoei no Kasa); 52. "Genesis of the Wings of Hope" (冀望の原点, Kibō no Genten)
15	August 9, 2018	978-4-06-512288-4	December 4, 2018	978-1-63236-657-3
53. "Setback at the Initiation" (経始の躓石, Keishi no Shiseki); 54. "In the Thick of Paranoia" (暗鬼の杜, Anki no Mori); 55. "Box of Delusions" (虚妄の匣, Kyomō no Hako); 56. "Illumination in the Dead of Night" (夜陰の明徴, Yain no Meichō)
16	December 7, 2018	978-4-06-513812-0	April 23, 2019	978-1-63236-829-4
57. "Before the Expedition" (遠征の前, Ensei no Mae); 58. "Moment of Departure" (出立の刻, Shuttatsu no Toki); 59. "Quagmire Underfoot" (霖雨の大地, Rin'u no Daichi); 60. "Tragedy in the Rain" (雨中の惨劇, Uchū no Sangeki)
17	April 9, 2019	978-4-06-515204-1	August 27, 2019	978-1-63236-875-1
61. "Fell Blade in the Royal Capital" (王都の兇刃, Ōto no Kyōjin); 62. "The Cost of Victory" (勝利の代償, Shōri no Daishō); 63. "The Deadly Greenwood" (緑林の死地, Ryokurin no Shichi); 64. "Glimmer in the Umbral Dark" (晦冥の眩耀, Kaimei no Genyō); "To a New Age" (新たなる時代へ, Aratanaru jidai e)

== Reception ==
The manga had 1.4 million copies in print in August 2015.

A number of volumes of the manga have made it onto The New York Times manga best-sellers list:

- Volume one was on the list for five non-consecutive weeks: for the first two weeks it ranked at number one.
- Volume two was on the list for one week at fifth place.
- Volume three was on the list for one week at fourth place.
- Volume four was on the list for two weeks, ranking at fourth and eighth place, respectively.
- Volume seven was on the list for one week, ranking at fourth place.

Reviewing the first novel for Anime News Network, Rebecca Silverman called it "well-written, engrossing, and with the feel of historical fiction rather than fantasy". She wrote that "Suzukaze's writing style is very visual, the prose can make your stomach churn and hair stand on end, not so much in a straight horror way, but more in the sense of a nightmare coming true when you had convinced yourself that it was just a dream." She concluded by saying "If you are not tired of Attack on Titan or perhaps just want a boost to flagging interest, Before the Fall is absolutely worth reading", and gave the book a grade of A−. Reviewing the second, omnibus volume, she also gave it a grade of A−, calling the book "an exciting read that requires little prior knowledge of the Attack on Titan world." She concluded her review by saying that the story "gives us what the original manga does in novel form, and there really is not much higher praise that an adaptation can get than that."
