= Finder (manga) =

Manga series by Ayano Yamane

- First volume of Finder as released by Libre in Japan on March 31, 2007

ファインダーシリーズ (Faindā Shirīzu)
- Genre: Crime; Erotic thriller; Yaoi
- Manga
- Written by: Ayano Yamane
- Published by: Biblos (2002–2006); Libre (2007-present)
- English publisher: NA: SuBLime (current) Digital Manga Publishing (former) Be Beautiful Manga (former)
- Imprint: BBC DX
- Magazine: Be × Boy Gold
- Original run: 2002 – present
- Volumes: 15
- Original video animation
- Studio: ANiMix Project
- Released: February 29, 2012 – present
- Runtime: 38 minutes
- Episodes: 2 + Special

The Finder series (Japanese: ファインダーシリーズ, Hepburn: Faindā Shirīzu) is a Japanese manga written and illustrated by Ayano Yamane. It is serialized in the semimonthly yaoi manga magazine Be × Boy Gold since 2001. Several adaptations of the manga have been released, including original video animations, light novels, and audio drama CDs.

== Plot ==
Twenty-three-year-old Akihito Takaba (高羽 秋仁, Takaba Akihito) is a young freelance photographer who takes pride in his work and seeks to get a major "scoop". After he takes photographs of the business dealings of crime lord Ryuichi Asami (麻見 隆一, Asami Ryūichi), Asami kidnaps him, beginning a relationship between them as they find themselves continually drawn to one another. Liu Fei Long (劉飛龍, Ryū Feiron; Chinese: Liú Fēilóng), a rival Chinese boss who blames Asami for his father's death, takes an interest in Takaba, as well, seeking a way to get revenge. Afterwards, Fei Long kidnaps Takaba, and Asami steals an important document of Fei Long's, which he uses to trade Takaba with.

== Characters ==
Akihito Takaba (高羽 秋仁, Takaba Akihito)
Voiced by: Tetsuya Kakihara
A freelance photographer and a college student who has just started working on his own; he's shown to be very athletic. Before he even got started into his career, he was a troublemaking delinquent during his high school years who has had numerous run-ins with the police until his father helped influence him into a better life path; he currently lives on his own in a condo where he also has his photography studio. He still strives to get a great scoop, as he often does gigs for magazine shoots, catalogs, and Miai photos. He first met Asami during the Sion Incident, which lead to Asami kidnapping as well as raping him-(de-virginizing him); as the series progresses, his relationship with Asami develops into a more romantic tone. He later arms himself with a firearm of his own, for protective purposes.

Ryuichi Asami (麻見 隆一, Asami Ryūichi)
Voiced by: Takaya Kuroda
A shrewd, powerful businessman who deals in shady businesses as well as having connections with underworld leaders in both Japan and China; he stands out not just for his professional assassin skills and talent but for his cold and beautiful looks; he is shown to own numerous types of firearms. Given his powerful status, he has friends and enemies in many places across Japan, and possibly other parts of the world; not much of his past or his personal background is revealed, and it is unknown as to why and how he ended up in such shady businesses. While he seems bitter and heartless at first, he does have a more caring and protective side, especially towards Akihito-(his love interest) and his subordinates.

Takato (タカト)
Voiced by: Shinnosuke Tachibana
One of Akihito's friends and classmates from college.

Kou (コウ)
Voiced by: Daisuke Hirakawa
One of Akihito's friends and classmates from college.

Feilong Liu (劉飛 龍)
Voiced by: Nobuo Tobita
The Head of Chinese drug syndicate, and leader of a Chinese Mafia group. His stronghold is located in Hong Kong. He was raised as the second son of the Hong Kong Mafia, the Ryou family, along with his brother, Yan-tzu. He assists his brother and does the dirty work. A man who pines for his father's attention, he is unaware that he is not the Ryou's true son, and that Yan-tzu harbors lustful designs towards him.

Michel Albatrof (ミシェル·アルバトフ, Misheru Arubatorofu)
The young leader of the Russian Mafia who is after Baishe's Casino in Macau and is very interested in Feilong's surroundings.

Yoh (嶽)
Feilong's trusted subordinate; however, he's actually a spy who was sent to Feilong's organization by Asami.

Tao (陶)
A young servant boy who tends to Feilong's needs. When he was much younger, Tao was a homeless orphan until Feilong brought him into his care; his position of work consists of taking care of his master, house cleaning, and serving tea. Since he doesn't attend school, he is instead homeschooled by a tutor, with Feilong sometimes helping him out with his homework. He speaks both Cantonese as well as some Japanese-(which he later makes improvements in).

== Media ==
=== Manga ===
The Finder series is written by Ayano Yamane. It is serialized in the manga magazines Be x Boy Gold and B-Boy Zips. The individual chapters were collected and published in 15 tankōbon volumes. Biblos originally published the series from 2002 to 2005. Following the Biblos' bankruptcy in 2006, Libre acquired the series in 2007, reprinting the first three volumes before continuing its release.

In 2004, Central Park Media licensed the Finder series in English for North American distribution under its Be Beautiful Manga imprint. After Libre acquired Biblos' assets following the latter's bankruptcy, they accused Central Park Media of infringing on its copyright of the transferred Biblos properties, stating that all foreign license holders needed to negotiate new licenses with Libre as those Biblos had sold ended with the company's bankruptcy. John O'Donnell, then manager of Central Park Media refused Libre's claims and felt that Biblos's original license agreements were still valid. In 2009, Central Park Media filed for bankruptcy and its assets, including licenses, were liquidated. Finder was not listed among the assets, indicating Central Park Media no longer held the license.

In March 2010, Digital Manga Publishing announced that it had acquired the English license to the Finder series, publishing the series under their Juné imprint. On June 18, 2016, Digital Media announced that their publishing agreement with Libre was terminating at the end of the month. On July 7, 2016, Viz Media acquired the licensing arrangements to publish the series under their SuBLime imprint. Since Volume 8 was released in Japan in May 2016, SubLime stated that they would publish Volume 8 first by March 2017, and then republish the first seven volumes every other month beginning in May 2017.

==== Volume list ====
No.	Title	Original release date	English release date
1	Target in the Finder (Be Beautiful); Target in the Viewfinder (Juné); Target in Sight (SuBLime); Faindā no Hyōteki (ファインダーの標的)	March 10, 2002 (Biblos); March 31, 2007 (Libre); 4-8352-1319-X (Biblos); ISBN 978-4-86263-152-7 (Libre)	August 30, 2005 (Be Beautiful); September 8, 2010 (Juné); June 13, 2017 (SuBLime); 978-1-9334-4000-2 (Be Beautiful); ISBN 978-1-5697-0186-7 (Juné); ISBN 978-1-4215-9305-0 (SuBLime)
1. Finder: Target in Sight; 2. FIXER; 3. Embracing Night's Unfading Desire; Deluxe Edition Bonus:Hardworking Cameraman Akihito Takaba's Romantic Service Apprenticeship
2	Cage in the Finder (Be Beautiful); Cage in the Viewfinder (Juné); Caught in a Cage (SuBLime); Faindā no Ori (ファインダーの檻)	May 10, 2004 (Biblos); May 1, 2007 (Libre); 4-8352-1590-7 (Biblos); ISBN 978-4-86263-171-8 (Libre)	November 30, 2005 (Be Beautiful); November 17, 2010 (Juné); August 8, 2017 (SuBLime); 978-1-9334-4001-9 (Be Beautiful); ISBN 978-1-5697-0187-4 (Juné); ISBN 978-1421593067 (SuBLime)
4. Body Chase; 5–8. Flower atop the Spire
3	One Wing in the Finder (Be Beautiful); One Wing in the Viewfinder (Juné); On One Wing (SuBLime); Faindā no Sekiyoku (ファインダーの隻翼)	November 11, 2005 (Biblos); June 1, 2007 (Libre); 4-8352-1821-3 (Biblos); ISBN 978-4-86263-192-3 (Libre)	April 3, 2007 (Be Beautiful); February 23, 2011 (Juné); October 10, 2017 (SuBLime); 978-1-9334-4023-1 (Be Beautiful); ISBN 978-1-5697-0188-1 (Juné); ISBN 978-1-4215-9307-4 (SuBLime)
9–13. Naked Truth (Japan Arc); Bonus: Love Surprise; Deluxe Edition Bonus: Hardworking Photographer Akihito Takaba's Alluring Overnight Overtime
4	Prisoner in the Viewfinder (Juné); In Captivity (SuBLime); Faindā no Ryoshū (ファインダーの虜囚)	June 8, 2007 (Libre); 978-4-86263-197-8	July 23, 2011 (Juné); December 12, 2017 (SuBLime); 978-1-5697-0189-8 (Juné); ISBN 978-1-4215-9308-1 (SuBLime)
14–20. Naked Truth (Hong Kong Arc); Bonus: Hardworking Photographer Akihito Takaba's Splendid Daily Life; Deluxe Edition Bonus: Hardworking Photographer Akihito Takaba's Hard-Core Business Boot Camp
5	Truth in the Viewfinder (Juné); Naked Truth (SuBLime); Faindā no Shinjitsu (ファインダーの真実)	June 10, 2009 (Libre); 978-4-86263-606-5	November 6, 2011 (Juné); February 13, 2018 (SuBLime); 978-1-5697-0190-4 (Juné); ISBN 978-1-4215-9309-8 (SuBLime)
Extra Edition: Naked Truth Zero; 21–26. Naked Truth (Hong Kong Arc); 27. A Fleeting Paradise
6	Passion Within the Viewfinder (Juné); You're My Desire (SuBLime); Faindā no Netsujō (ファインダーの熱情)	April 9, 2011 (Libre); 978-4-86263-943-1	June 27, 2012 (Juné); April 1, 2018 (SuBLime); 978-1-5697-0273-4 (Juné); ISBN 978-1-4215-9310-4 (SuBLime)
28. A Fleeting Paradise 2: Drowning in a Bloody Mary Sea; 29–33. Escape and Love; Bonus: Target in the Viewfinder…in Love!; Bonus: A Secretary's Duty; Deluxe Edition Bonus: Hardworking Photographer Akihito Takaba's Perfect Househusband Life
7	Desire in the Viewfinder (Juné); Longing for You (SuBLime); Faindā no Katsubō (ファインダーの渇望)	August 10, 2013 (Libre); 978-4-7997-1493-5	November 26, 2014 (Juné); June 18, 2018 (SuBLime); 978-1-5697-0333-5 (Juné); ISBN 978-1-4215-9311-1 (SuBLime)
34–42. Pray in the Abyss; Bonus: Hardworking Photographer Akihito Takaba's Elegant Summer Vacation; Bonus: Hardworking Photographer Akihito Takaba's Ephemeral Summer Evening; Bonus: Hardworking Chief Akihito Takaba's Rosy Record of Achievements; Deluxe Edition Bonus: The Day Young Businessman Ryuichi Asami's Little Monster Came
8	Secret Vow (SuBLime); Faindā no Mitsuyaku (ファインダーの密約)	May 7, 2016 (Libre); 978-4-7997-2928-1	March 14, 2017 (SuBLime); 978-1-4215-9312-8
43–51. Pray in the Abyss; Bonus: Hardworking Photographer Akihito Takaba and the Attack of the Love Monster; Deluxe Edition Bonus: My Fair Prince: A Night of Celebration
9	Beating of My Heart (SuBLime); Faindā no Kodō (ファインダーの鼓動)	August 28, 2018 (limited edition) (Libre); November 9, 2019 (regular edition) (Libre); 978-4-7997-3972-3 (limited edition); ISBN 978-4-7997-4101-6 (regular edition)	September 10, 2019 (SuBLime); 978-1-9747-0790-4 (SuBLime)
52–59. Pray in the Abyss; Bonus: Young Businessman Ryuichi Asami's Little Monster, Plus One; Deluxe Edition Bonus: Akihito Takaba's Sentai Warrior in the Viewfinder
10	Honeymoon (SuBLime); Faindā no Mitsugetsu (ファインダーの蜜月)	December 10, 2019 (Libre); 978-4-7997-4603-5	February 9, 2021 (SuBLime); 978-1-9747-2560-1 (SuBLime)
60–63. Pray in the Abyss; Bonus: Ryuichi Asami's Halloween Night; Bonus: The Boss's Secret Fur Ball Life; Deluxe Edition Bonus: Akihito Takaba and Ryuichi Asami's Mysterious Forest Adventure
11	To the Edge (SuBLime); Faindā no Saihate (ファインダーの最果て)	April 28, 2021 (Libre); 978-4-79-975218-0	May 10, 2022 (SuBLime); 978-1-9747-2983-8 (SuBLime)
64–66. Pray in the Abyss; 67. After Pray in the Abyss; 68. Innocent Eyes; Bonus: The Day Akihito Takaba's Pumpkin Pudding Disappeared; Deluxe Edition Bonus: Akihito Takaba's Target in the Viewfinder Is…?!
12	Embrace (SuBLime); Faindā no Hōyō (ファインダーの抱擁)	June 30, 2022 (Libre); 978-4-79-975765-9	July 11, 2023 (SuBLime); 978-1-9747-3868-7 (SuBLime)
69–73. Innocent Eyes; Bonus: Finder's Heroes; Deluxe Edition Bonus: Akihito Takaba's Finder Strikes Back
13	Mirage (SuBLime); Faindā no Kagerō (ファインダーの陽炎)	August 28, 2023 (Libre); 978-4-79-976390-2	June 11, 2024 (SuBLime); 978-1-9747-4698-9 (SuBLime)
74–77. Innocent Eyes; Bonus: Finder's Reminiscence; Deluxe Edition Bonus: Akihito Takaba's Rabbit Syndrome
14	Crazy in Love; Faindā no Dekiai (ファインダーの溺愛)	November 26, 2024 (Libre); 978-4-79-976963-8	December 9, 2025 (SuBLime); 978-1-9747-5851-7 (SuBLime)
78. Innocent Eyes; 79–81. Love × Escape
15	Faindā no Tōhikō (ファインダーの逃避行)	March 26, 2026 (Libre); 978-4-79-977704-6	—

== Chapters not yet published in volume format ==
=== Light novels ===
A light novel adaptation was written by Ai Satoko and published by Libre, with illustrations provided by Yamane.

No.	Title	Japanese release date	Japanese ISBN
1	Faindā no Rakuin (ファインダーの烙印)	September 28, 2012	978-4-7997-1194-1
2	Faindā no Sōen (ファインダーの蒼炎)	January 19, 2017	978-4-7997-3161-1

=== Other media ===
==== Anime ====
A special anime adaptation of 'Target in the Finder' (ファインダーの標的) was recently released by ANiMix Project on February 29, 2012 – starring Japanese voice actors Tetsuya Kakihara as Akihito, Takaya Kuroda as Asami, and Nobuo Tobita as Feilong. It is not really a fully animated animation, as the animation was limited to only the character's mouth, eyes, and some important body movements of the scenes. A special Cast Talk CD was included in First Press edition. A preview of an ANiMiX was made for the manga series Yebisu Celebrities.

==== Drama CDs ====
- A 2-disk drama CD of the first volume of the series was re-released by Geneon Entertainment under its "Cue Egg" label on May 25, 2007, containing 10 audio tracks. It featured the voices of Akira Sasanuma, Takehito Koyasu, and Hideo Ishikawa as the three central characters.
- The second released 2-disk drama CD is the third volume of the series, 'One Wing in the Finder' (ファインダーの隻翼), released by Libre Publishing on September 28, 2011. It featured the voices of Tetsuya Kakihara as Akihito, Takaya Kuroda as Asami, and Nobuo Tobita as Feilong. It includes the complete Japan chapter of "Naked Truth"! and this set also contains "Hard-Working Cameraman Akihito Takaba's Refined Day" and "Love Surprise"! A special Cast Talk CD was included if you exclusively bought from Libre online store.

==== Others ====
A character book was released December 18, 2007 that included a pull-out poster.

== Reception ==
In May 2009, Germany's Federal Department for Media Harmful to Young Persons labeled the first volume of Finder as "harmful to young persons", which results in the first volume of the series being "restricted to people of legal age only. It is also prohibited to show incriminated content as teasers, trailers or in any other advertising context." In response, Tokyopop Germany removed the information about the first volume from its website, but continued to list the other three volumes it had already published.

In Manga: The Complete Guide, Jason Thompson gave the series a rating of 3½ out of four stars, stating that the series is "written in an appropriately dark and brooding fashion" due to its use of "graphic sex and S&M", and praised the art as "coolly attractive".

Digital Manga Publishing's translation of volume 3 ranked #4 on The New York Times Best Seller list for manga the week of May 1, 2011. SuBLime's translation of volume 7 ranked #1 on The New York Times Manga Bestseller List.
