= Ayano Yamane =

Japanese josei manga artist (born 1977)

Ayano Yamane やまね あやの
- Born: December 18, 1977 (age 48) Awaji Island, Hyōgo Prefecture, Japan
- Area: Manga Artist
- Notable works: Finder Series, Crimson Spell

Ayano Yamane (やまね あやの, Yamane Ayano) is a Japanese manga artist and illustrator. She debuted as a professional manga artist in 1996 and since then has published several boys' love series and illustrated many light novels. Ayano Yamane is known for her humour and detailed art. She is one of the top selling yaoi manga artists in Japan. Her most successful work is the Finder Series.

== Career ==
Yamane debuted professionally as a manga artist in 1996.

On August 17, 2026, Magazine Be × Boy announced that she would be illustrating the manga adaptation of the novel, Husky and His White Cat Shizun, for serialized release in Be × Boy Gold. It was canceled on August 19, 2026, after it was found that Yamane had previously made anti-Korean and anti-Chinese tweets on her Twitter account.

== Works ==
=== Manga ===
- The Strength of Pure Soul (強がりのPure Soul, Tsuyogari no Pure Soul) (2000)
- Like a Hero (ヒーローみたいに, Hero Mitai ni) (b-Boy Zips, 2000)
- Double Face (ダブルフェイス) (Drap, 2001)
- Lock Out! (LOCK OUT!) (Chara Selection, 2002)
- Finder (ファインダーシリーズ, Faindā Shirīzu) (Biblos → Libre Publishing, 2002-present)
- A Foreign Love Affair (異国色恋浪漫譚, Ikoku Irokoi Romantan), (Core Magazine, 2003)
- Crimson Spell (クリムゾン・スぺル), (Tokuma Shoten, 2004–2005)
- Koisuru Finder no Hyouteki (恋するファインダーの標的) ( (Magazine Be x Boy, 2009)
- Koi o Suru DNA + (恋するDNA+) (2010)

In 2010, Digital Manga Publishing licensed Finder Series in English. From 2007 to 2008, Kitty Media held the North American license of Crimson Spell, but in 2013 SuBLime Manga acquired the rights to publish this title. 801 Media has licensed A Foreign Love Affair.

=== Light Novel Illustration ===
- Finder no Hyouteki (ファインダーの標的) (b-Boy Phoenix, 2007) Story & Art
- Shousetsu Finder no Rakuin (小説 ファインダー烙印) (2012) Art

=== Artbooks ===
- Artbook: Yamane Ayano Illustrations - Aya (やまねあやのイラスト集 ｢絢｣), Biblos, 2004
