= List of The New York Times Manga Best Sellers =

The New York Times Best Seller list for manga published in the United States was introduced on March 5, 2009, along with two additional lists for hardcover and paperback graphic novels. The three lists were grouped under the "Graphic Books" category. The manga list was published weekly until January 2017, when the Times stop producing separate "Graphic Books" best seller lists. Today New York times best selling manga volumes are displayed under the "Graphic Books and Manga" monthly list which was launched in 2019 October. Deborah Hoffman, an editor for the Best Seller lists, explained that the term "Graphic Books" was selected to create an "inclusive and expansive" list which can extend to works of both fiction and nonfiction. Journalist George Gustines announced, in his introduction of the new lists, "Comics have finally joined the mainstream." The announcement was made the week the film Watchmen, based on the comic book of the same name, was released in movie theaters throughout the U.S. The Best Seller lists are printed weekly in The New York Times Book Review magazine, which is published in the Sunday edition of The New York Times and as a stand-alone publication.

Gustines explained the methodology used to determine the rankings:

Rankings reflect sales of graphic novels [...] at many thousands of venues where a wide range of books are sold nationwide. These include hundreds of independent book retailers (statistically weighted to represent all such outlets); national, regional and local chains; online and multimedia entertainment retailers; university, gift, supermarket, discount department stores and newsstands. In addition, these rankings also include unit sales reported by retailers nationwide that specialize in graphic novels and comic books.

On multiple occasions, manga have been listed outside its designated list. Mike Kiley, then-Senior Vice President of the publisher Tokyopop, explained in 2010 that it has become more difficult to draw a distinguishing line between works that are manga and manga-inspired, such as Korean manhwa and American original English language (OEL) manga. A Drifting Life, an autobiographical manga by Yoshihiro Tatsumi, appeared on the May 3, 2009, Best Seller list for paperback graphic novels, where it ranked third. X-Men: Misfits, an original English manga based on the X-Men comic book franchise, ranked fifth at its debut on the August 30, 2009, paperback graphic novels list, and stayed on the chart for five consecutive weeks. The first volume of a manhwa adaptation of the popular vampire-themed Twilight novels by Stephenie Meyer remained on the hardcover graphic novels Best Seller list for 27 consecutive weeks in 2010.

== 2009 ==
The first year of the Best Seller list saw 55 manga titles and one light novel title make their appearances. Of these, eight titles reached the top of the weekly list (in order of number of weeks at the top of the list, from highest to lowest): Naruto, 18 weeks; Bleach, 9 weeks; Vampire Knight, 7 weeks; Fruits Basket, Pokémon Special, 4 weeks; Negima!, 3 weeks; Chibi Vampire, 1 week; Fullmetal Alchemist, 1 week; and Warriors: Ravenpaw's Path, 1 week. Naruto and Warriors: Ravenpaw's Path were the only two titles to reach the top rank on the week of their debut.

The Best Seller list debuted at a time when the release schedule of Naruto was being accelerated; its releases occupied a majority of the first weekly top ten rankings. Junjo Romantica became the first yaoi (boys' love) title to enter the Best Seller list when it debuted in week 28. Death Note's L: Change the World became the first light novel to enter the top ten rankings in week 43. Adam Kepler noted that vampire literature had become popular over the previous year, and he featured Vampire Knight in the introduction to the week 46 list. It was the first manga title to be featured in the introduction which accompanies list.

== 2010 ==
A total of 389 manga titles, one light novel title, and one fan book title made their first appearances in 2010. Black Butler, Hetalia: Axis Powers, and Rosario + Vampire: Season II were the only three titles to reach the top rank on the week of their series debut. In this first full year of the Best Seller list, 15 titles reached the top of the weekly list (in order of number of weeks at the top of the list, from highest to lowest): Naruto, 19 weeks; Bleach, 4 weeks; Negima!, 4 weeks; Rosario + Vampire: Season II, 4 weeks; Vampire Knight, 5 weeks; Pokémon Special 4 weeks; Black Bird, 2 weeks; Black Butler, 2 weeks; Fullmetal Alchemist, 2 weeks; Hetalia: Axis Powers, 2 weeks; Maximum Ride, 2 weeks; Warriors: Ravenpaw's Path, 2 weeks; Yu-Gi-Oh! GX, 2 weeks; Alice in the Country of Hearts, 1 week; Tsubasa: Reservoir Chronicle, 1 week; and Ouran High School Host Club, 1 week.

Black Butler was the first release published by Yen Press to reach the top rank. Gustines observed that the week 45 releases of Bakuman, D.Gray-man, and Otomen demonstrated the diversity of the Viz Media's publishing line. Bakuman features a slice of life story, D.Gray-man contains demon-slaying, while Otomen is a romance series. Viz Media also introduced an aggressive release schedule for One Piece in 2010, releasing five volumes per month between January and June to bring the volume count of the English release from 24 to 53. On two separate occasions, five One Piece volumes (39–43 in week 15 and 44–48 in week 19) debuted on the Best Seller list simultaneously. Week 19 was also the first time a Naruto release did not appear in the top ten rankings.

== 2011 ==
A total of 18 manga titles have made first appearances in 2011. As of the 33rd week, nine titles reached the top of the weekly list (in order of number of weeks at the top of the list, from highest to lowest): Naruto, 12 weeks; Pokémon Special 11 weeks, Black Bird, 4 weeks; Hetalia: Axis Powers, 4 weeks; Black Butler, 3 weeks; Rosario + Vampire: Season II, 3 weeks; Yu-Gi-Oh! GX, 3 weeks; Negima!, 2 weeks; Fullmetal Alchemist, 1 week; and Maximum Ride, 1 week.

Deb Aoki noted that while the second volume of Hetalia: Axis Powers debuted at the top of the Best Seller list, the series may be selling more than the charts indicate because The New York Times does not include sales from digital download sites such as comiXology and Zinio. Black Butler became the first title other than Naruto to have four different releases listed simultaneously on the rankings in week 5. Week 24 saw a high turnover from the previous week's list as nine new releases, all published by Viz Media, entered the rankings. The high turnover occurred again in week 28 when eight new releases entered the weekly list, with only Naruto and Vampire Knight remaining from the previous week.

== See also ==
- List of best-selling manga
- Lists of The New York Times number-one books
