= Flashback =

Flashback(s) or Flash Back may refer to:

- Flashback (narrative), in literature and drama, a scene that takes the narrative back in time
- Flashback (psychology), in which a memory is suddenly and unexpectedly revisited
  - Acid flashback, a reported psychological effect of LSD use
- Flashback (welding), a hazard of using an oxyacetylene torch
- Flashback arrestor, a safety device used in oxy-fuel welding and cutting

== Computing ==
- Flashback (Trojan), computer malware that infects computers running Mac OS X
- Atari Flashback series, a line of video-game consoles that emulate 1980s-era Atari games
- Oracle Flashback, a means of retrieving data as it existed in an Oracle database at an earlier time
- Flashback Forum, a Swedish online forum

== Film, television and radio ==
- Flashback (1969 film), an Italian film by Raffaele Andreassi
- Flashback (1990 film), an American film by Franco Amurri
- Flashback (2020 film), a Canadian film by Christopher MacBride
- Flashback (2021 film), a French film by Caroline Vigneaux
- Flashback (TV series), a 1962–1968 Canadian quiz show
- Flashback (radio program), an American syndicated radio program
- Flashback, a Flash animation using a song from the Shpongle album Are You Shpongled?

=== Television episodes ===
- "Flashback (Part 1)", A Country Practice season 9, episode 81 (1989)
- "Flashback (Part 2)", A Country Practice season 9, episode 82 (1989)
- "Flashback", Battleground season 1, episode 10 (2012)
- "Flashback!", CHiPs season 1, episode 22 (1978)
- "Flashback", Dangerous Curves season 2, episode 16 (1993)
- "Flashback", Desperate Housewives season 7, episode 14 (2011)
- "Flashback", Dramarama season 4, episode 7 (1986)
- "Flashback", Due South season 2, episode 18 (1996)
- "Flashback", First Yaya episode 44 (2023)
- "Flashback", F/X: The Series season 2, episode 10 (1997)
- "Flashback", Gimme a Break! season 3, episode 14 (1984)
- "Flashback", Hotel (American) season 1, episode 6 (1983)
- "Flashback", Just Deal season 3, episode 1 (2002)
- "Flashback", Largo Winch season 1, episode 21 (2002)
- "Flashback", Magnum, P.I. (1980) season 3, episode 7 (1982)
- "Flashback", Maude season 1, episode 8 (1972)
- "Flashback", Max Monroe: Loose Cannon episodes 6–7 (1990)
- "Flashback", Malcolm in the Middle season 2, episode 25 (2001)
- "Flashback", Murder in Mind series 2, episode 5 (2002)
- "Flashback", My Three Sons season 3, episode 19 (1963)
- "Flashback", Night Heat season 3, episode 11 (1987)
- "Flashback", SilverHawks episode 40 (1986)
- "Flashback", Star Trek: Voyager season 3, episode 2 (1996)
- "Flashback", Static Shock season 3, episode 14 (2003)
- "Flashback", Sykes series 5, episode 6 (1976)
- "Flashback", Teen Titans Go! season 4, episodes 48–49 (2018)
- "Flashback", The Bing Crosby Show episode 6 (1964)
- "Flashback", The Rookie: Feds season 1, episode 9 (2022)
- "Flashback", Walker, Texas Ranger season 3, episodes 22–23 (1995)
- "Flashback: Mike and Gloria's Wedding", All in the Family season 3, episodes 9–10 (1972)
- "Flashback: Mike Meets Archie", All in the Family season 2, episode 5 (1971)
- "Flash Back", The Flash (2014) season 2, episode 17 (2016)
- "The Flashback - Animator vs. Animation 7", Animator vs. Animation season 2, episode 3 (2019)

== Literature ==
- Flashback (comics), a mutant character in Marvel Comics
- Flashback, a 2011 novel by American writer Dan Simmons
- Flashback, a 1964 novel by British writer Leo Ognall under the pen name Harry Carmichael
- Flashback, a member of the Blood Syndicate in Milestone Comics
- Flashback Media Group, a Swedish publishing group and Internet forum host
- Flashbacks (book), a 1983 autobiography by Timothy Leary

== Music ==
- Flashback Records (disambiguation)

=== Albums ===
- Flashback (Darin album) or the title song, 2008
- Flashback (Don Friedman album) or the title song, 1963
- Flashback (Electric Light Orchestra album), 2000
- Flashback (Ivy Queen album), 2005
- Flashback (Joan Jett album), 1993
- Flashback (Pernilla Wahlgren album) or the title song, 1989
- Flashback (single album), by After School, or the title song, 2012
- Flashback: The Best of 38 Special, 1987
- Flashback! Rock Classics Of The '70s, a charity compilation, 1991
- Flash Back, by Capsule, or the title song, 2007
- Flashbacks (album), by the Fuzztones, 1996
- Flashbacks (EP), by Contemplate, 2018
- Flashback: The Best of The J. Geils Band, by the J. Geils Band, 1985
- Flash Back 1979-1986, by Aerodrom, 1996

=== Songs ===
- "Flashback" (Calvin Harris song), 2009
- "Flashback"/"Komorebi no Uta", by High and Mighty Color, 2008
- "Flashbacks" (song), by Inna, 2021
- "Flashback", by Ashford & Simpson from Is It Still Good to Ya, 1978
- "Flashback", by Ghali, 2019
- "Flashback", by Icona Pop from Icona Pop, 2012
- "Flashback", by Imagination from Body Talk, 1981
- "Flashback", by Kelly Rowland from Ms. Kelly, 2007
- "Flashback", by Laurent Garnier, 1997
- "Flashback", by Ministry from The Land of Rape and Honey, 1988
- "Flashback", by Simon Webbe from Smile, 2017
- "Flashback", by Sonic Syndicate from Only Inhuman, 2007
- "Flashback", by Tina Arena from In Deep, 1997
- "Flashback", by Tomahawk from Tomahawk, 2001
- "Flashback (Excerpt)", a 2025 track by Toby Fox from Deltarune Chapters 3+4 OST from the video game Deltarune
- "Flash Back", by Ivy Queen from The Original Rude Girl, 1998
- "Flash Back", by Kelis from Wanderland, 2001
- "Flash Back", by Jay Chou from Secret, 2007
- "Flash Back", by Rustie from Glass Swords, 2011
- "Flashbacks", by Chris Brown from Indigo, 2019
- "Flashbacks", by Marshmello from Joytime II, 2018

== Roller coasters ==
- Flashback (Six Flags Magic Mountain), a steel roller coaster at Six Flags Magic Mountain, US
- Flashback (Six Flags New England), a steel roller coaster at Six Flags New England, US
- Flashback (Six Flags Over Texas), a steel boomerang roller coaster at Six Flags Over Texas, US

== Video games ==
- Flashback (1992 video game), a science fiction cinematic platform game
- Flashback (2013 video game), a remake of the 1992 game

== See also ==
- Backflash (disambiguation)
- "City on the Edge of Forever" (also known as "Flashbacks"), episode seven of the second season of South Park (1997)
- Flashbacks of a Fool, a 2008 British drama film directed by Baillie Walsh
