= Kanu Unchō =

Kan'u Unchō is the Japanese name of Guan Yu. This name is usually used in some Three Kingdoms–related manga and anime.

- Kanu Unchō, a female fighter in Ikki Tousen
- Kanu Unchō, a female general in Koihime Musō
- Kanu Gundam, a Gundam warrior in BB Senshi Sangokuden
