= Sōsō Mōtoku =

Sōsō Mōtoku (曹操 孟德, Chinese: Cáo Cāo Mèngdé) is the Japanese spelling of the name of the historical figure Cao Cao.

Sōsō Mōtoku also refers to:

- Sōsō Mōtoku, the female feudal lord in Koihime Musō who is based on Cao Cao.
- Sōsō Mōtoku, the male fighter in Ikkitōsen, also based on Cao Cao.
