= Concrete Revolutio =

Japanese anime television series

- Concrete Revolutio: Superhuman Phantasmagoria

コンクリート・レボルティオ ～超人幻想～ (Konkurīto Reborutio: Chōjin Gensō)
- Genre: Superhero
- Created by: Bones; Shō Aikawa
- Anime television series
- Directed by: Seiji Mizushima
- Produced by: Yoshihiro Ōyabu; Minoru Takanashi; Hirotaka Kaneko; Hirotsugu Ogisu; Ryōsuke Nakaji; Tsutomu Yanagimura; Takuya Hosaka
- Written by: Shō Aikawa; Masaki Tsuji
- Music by: Kakeru Ishihama (Monaca); Keigo Hoashi (Monaca); Yōsuke Yamamoto
- Studio: Bones
- Licensed by: AUS: Madman Entertainment; NA: Crunchyroll
- Original network: Tokyo MX
- English network: US: Funimation Channel
- Original run: 4 October 2015 – 27 December 2015
- Episodes: 13
- Anime television series

The Last Song
- Directed by: Seiji Mizushima
- Produced by: Yoshihiro Ōyabu; Minoru Takanashi; Hirotaka Kaneko; Hirotsugu Ogisu; Ryōsuke Nakaji; Tsutomu Yanagimura; Takuya Hosaka
- Written by: Shō Aikawa; Kazuki Nakashima; Gen Urobuchi
- Music by: Kakeru Ishihama (Monaca); Keigo Hoashi (Monaca); Yōsuke Yamamoto
- Studio: Bones
- Licensed by: AUS: Madman Entertainment; NA: Crunchyroll
- Original network: Tokyo MX
- Original run: 3 April 2016 – 17 June 2016
- Episodes: 11
- Manga
- Written by: Nylon
- Published by: Kadokawa Shoten
- English publisher: NA: Seven Seas Entertainment
- Magazine: Young Ace
- Original run: September 2015 – July 2016
- Volumes: 2

Concrete Revolutio: Superhuman Phantasmagoria (コンクリート・レボルティオ ～超人幻想～, Konkurīto Reborutio: Chōjin Gensō) is a Japanese superhero anime television series created and written by Shō Aikawa, directed by Seiji Mizushima, produced by Bones, and featuring character designs by Yoshiyuki Ito. It began airing in Japan in October 2015. A second season debuted on 3 April 2016.

Concrete Revolutio received polarizing reviews from critics, who praised the anime's unique art direction, setting, and animation, but were divided on its narrative and usage of nonlinear storytelling.

== Plot ==
In the 41st year of the Shinka era (AD 1966), Earth is home to superhumans and paranormal phenomena of all kinds, from aliens and magical girls to ghosts and transforming robots. However, knowledge of these beings is officially kept classified. The Japanese government has quietly set up the "Super Population Research Laboratory", a.k.a. the "Superhuman Bureau", to keep track of all superhuman beings in the country and eliminate them if they pose a threat to humanity. In the present, Bureau member Jiro Hitoyoshi finds himself recruiting new superhumans for the Bureau in the course of his job. By Shinka 46 (AD 1971), Jiro has become a vigilante on the run from the Bureau while the rest of its members deal with the consequences of their earlier actions.

== Characters ==
=== Superhuman Bureau ===
Jiro Hitoyoshi (人吉 爾朗, Hitoyoshi Jirō)
Voiced by: Kaito Ishikawa (Japanese), Greg Ayres (English)
The male protagonist of the series. The point-man of the Superhuman Bureau and the only real human of the group, he is an "ally of justice" who seeks to protect all superhumans, both heroes and villains. Episode 4 reveals that he possesses the superhuman ability to produce and control crimson flames from his left arm, which tend to burn anything they come in contact with. As he tends to lose control over his powers, Jirō's left arm has white straps with red markings and three gears inside his arm, which can be unlocked to activate his power. Once the third gear is unlocked, he loses control of himself and goes berserk. Emi is the only one who can close up and seal the gears back into his arm, returning him to normal. He drives a silver-plated supercar that can transform into a quadrupedal mech named "Equus." Jirō is later revealed to be a Kaiju from another dimension, which is where his powers originate.
Kikko Hoshino (星野 輝子, Hoshino Kikko),
Voiced by: Sumire Uesaka (Japanese), Jad Saxton (English)
A magical girl with an interest in manga, especially for its fictional portrayals of magical girls. According to Ullr, Kikko is a demon from another dimension who gains power by indirectly forming a contract with those she saves. As a demon, she is a candidate to become the queen of the demon world and was sent to the human world in search of a husband. In her magical girl form, her hair turns lavender and she wears a dress, using a staff topped with a star ornament that she can also use while untransformed. In her devil realm outfit, Kikko wears a more revealing black outfit with a cape and a helmet that borders her face, and uses a weapon called "Comet Tail" that seems to come out of Ullr's star. While in her devil form, she has a ruthless personality and is more powerful. Kikko develops feelings for Jirō and is a rival to Emi for his affection.
Emi Kino (鬼野 笑美, Kino Emi)
Voiced by: Aki Toyosaki (Japanese), Anastasia Muñoz (English)
A half-human half-yōkai who has lived with Jirō and had feelings for him ever since they were young. She is very protective of Jirō and once claimed to be his fiancée, seeing Kikko as a rival for his affection and hating when she gets close to him. Emi wears a white and blue outlined coat over a dark gray long-sleeved shirt with the sleeves coming up and cutting off at her knuckles, along with a cranberry pencil miniskirt and very high dark gray heel boots with golden buttons. She is the only one who can restore the locks holding Jirō's flames at bay without getting killed. Emi's powers include controlling birds and shape-shifting, as well as controlling spirit-like foxes who can follow and track people.
Fuurouta (風郎太, Fūrōta)
Voiced by: Eriko Nakamura (Japanese), Alison Viktorin (English)
A ghost with a child's body and personality who can change shape at will and phase through inorganic objects, who loves playing childish pranks on people. Jirō recommends that he join the Superhuman Bureau.
Hyōma Yoshimura (芳村 兵馬, Yoshimura Hyōma)
Voiced by: Tokuyoshi Kawashima (Japanese), Christopher Bevins (English)
Usually called "Mr. Jaguar", Yoshimura is a man from the 25th century who was sent by the Time Patrol to destroy the Advocates of Free History. His powers include the ability to transform into a jaguar and stop time using his pocket watch. He is also a genius physicist and created Equus. After deciding that he could make the future better if he changed the past, he left the Time Patrol and formed IQ.
Daishi Akita (秋田 大志, Akita Daishi)
Voiced by: Tetsuo Kanao (Japanese); Mark Stoddard (English)
Raito Shiba (柴 来人, Shiba Raito)
Voiced by: Kenichi Suzumura (Japanese), Ian Sinclair (English)
A formerly-human detective who was killed during a case, after which his personality was implanted in the body of an android by an unnamed scientist. Raito is the only detective in the Tokyo Metropolitan Police who works on superhuman cases, though he finds himself stymied by the Superhuman Bureau as they cover up evidence.
Magotake Hitoyoshi (人吉 孫竹, Hitoyoshi Magotake)
Voiced by: Shinichiro Miki (Japanese), Jason Douglas (English)
A professor who serves as the technical expert of the Superhuman Bureau. Though his knowledge is mainly in physics and robotics, he has studied enough anthropology to deal with organic superhumans.
Ullr (ウル, Ullr)
Voiced by: Tōru Ōkawa (Japanese), David Wald (English)
Kikko's Daruma-like assistant.
Molly (モリー, Molly)
Voiced by: Yusuke Kuwahata (Japanese), Orion Pitts (English)
A chill and clever man.

=== Superhumans ===
Grosse Augen/Akira Shirota (グロスオーゲン/白田晃, Gurosu Ōgen/Shirota Akira)
Voiced by: Masakazu Nishida (Japanese); Anthony Bowling (English)
A police officer who fused with Grosse Augen, an alien who crash-landed on Earth and shared his life with Akira to ensure his safety, while Akira used Augen's power to fight giant monsters and outer space threats. When the Superhuman Bureau sees him as a threat due to his size, Hitoyoshi was sent to kill him. However, he instead ordered Akira to give his life to Augen, allowing the alien to leave Earth while taking an unconscious S Planeterian as a substitute, allowing him to fight as a superhero once again. In Shinka 46, he assisted Hitoyoshi after he was on the run from the Superhuman Bureau.
S Planeterian (S遊星人, Esu Wakuseijin)
Voiced by: Chikara Osaka (Japanese); Shawn Gann (English)
An alien invader and Grosse Augen's nemesis. After he was defeated by Augen with help from Equus, he was shrunken and rendered unconscious, allowing Akira to use his body while Augen returned to his home planet. His body has blue markings, which changed to red when being possessed by Akira.
Tartarus Bugmen (タルタロス蟲人, Tarutarosu Chujin)
A race of prehistoric bugs from the ancient years, who maintained their existence in the modern era and signed a contract with humanity to reside in the forest. However, after corrupt politicians ordered the deforestation of their homes, they sought vengeance until Fuurouta threw a canister of ancient virus, which successfully halted their attack but endangered their race.
Campe (カムペ, Kamupe)
Voiced by: Nana Mizuki (Japanese); Monica Rial (English)
The queen of the Tartarus Bugmen, who was captured by a bug salesman and offered for sale at ¥100,000 yen until Fuurouta rescued her. She is able to transform into the human form of a young girl, which later changed into an adult woman seven years later. She became interested in Fuurouta and befriended him; however, after he killed most of the Bugmen, she tried to take revenge seven years later in Shinka 48, though Hiyotoshi's interference halted her assaults. Despite having ceased her vengeance, she is incapable of befriending Fuurouta due to his age and appearance.

== Development ==
Bones first unveiled the project on 1 July 2015. The series is directed by Seiji Mizushima and written by Shō Aikawa. Yoshiyuki Ito provides character designs and animation direction; Noizi Ito, Hekiru Hikawa, and Ryō Hirao are in charge of character creation and concept design; and Kanetake Ebikawa, Takayuki Yanase, Toshiaki Ihara, and Hideyuki Matsumoto are in charge of SF concept design. Ken Ohtsuka is the series mechanical animation director, and Hiroki Matsumoto provides the series art design. Masafumi Mima is the series' sound director. Anime Consortium Japan co-produced the series.

== Media ==
=== Anime ===
The anime began airing on 4 October 2015, to run for two cours (half a year), airing on Tokyo MX, Sun TV, KBS Kyoto, and BS11. The series is streamed worldwide by Daisuki, and in North America by Funimation. Following Sony's acquisition of Crunchyroll, the series was moved to Crunchyroll. The opening theme song, "Katararezu Tomo" (カタラレズトモ), is performed by ZAQ, and the closing theme song is performed by Yohske Yamamoto.

The second season premiered in April 2016.

==== Episodes ====
===== Season 1 (2015) =====
No. overall	No. in season	Title (Note: English titles are taken from Funimation.)	Directed by	Written by	Storyboarded by	Original release date
1	1	"The Witch Girl of Tokyo"; Transliteration: "Tōkyō no Majo" (Japanese: 東京の魔女)	Tomoyuki Kurokawa	Shō Aikawa	Seiji Mizushima, Ken Ōtsuka, Yasushi Muraki	4 October 2015
While working as a waitress at a cafe, Kikko Hoshino is asked by a man named Jiro Hitoyoshi to do a job for him, preventing a top Japanese scientist named Professor Onda from selling research secrets to a corporate spy. Strangely enough, the supposed spy is seen giving Onda a package instead of taking one from him. Even so, Kikko stops Onda from leaving, as the spy reveals himself to be an alien from Planet S. Kikko reveals herself to be a magical girl, and teleports outside with the package. However, the alien follows and grows giant-sized until the giant superhuman Grosse Augen appears and vanishes with the alien. With Kikko and Jiro's help, Grosse Augen defeats the alien, but Jiro tracks down his alter-ego anyway and confronts him. Grosse Augen turns out to be an alien borrowing a Japanese policeman's body as it would have died otherwise, but the strain is supposedly killing them both. Jiro appears to take Grosse Augen into an alleyway and vaporize him. The scene flashes to a point five years later, when it is revealed to Kikko that Jiro freed Grosse Augen reach his home planet while reviving the policeman in the body of the defeated S Planetarian. As a result, the Superhuman Bureau made Jiro a target, and he refuses to go with Kikko as he escapes with the policeman.
2	2	"Inside the "Black Fog""; Transliteration: ""Kuroi Kiri" no Naka de" (Japanese: 『黒い霧』の中で)	Hiroyuki Ōshima	Shō Aikawa	Hideyo Yamamoto	11 October 2015
A ghost named Fuurouta plays a prank on a class trip, freeing a prized green beetle from its cage while a mysterious black fog rolls through the area. Shortly after the incident, the black fog settles on the Japanese Diet building as the Superhuman Bureau restrains Fuurouta, unsure of what to do with him. While escaping from captivity, Fuurouta runs into a strange girl named Campe and offers to be friends with her. Meanwhile, Jiro finds the corpses of Japanese Public Security superhumans who were defeated by the Tartaros Bugmen from inside the black fog. Fuurouta overhears Professor Hitoyoshi describe how he has revived an ancient virus to kill the Tartaros Bugmen, and the next day Fuurouta offers to help the Bureau kill them in exchange for letting him join. After taking the virus, Fuurouta shelters the green bug from before, then tosses the virus container like a bug bomb, killing the Tartaros Bugmen and dissipating the black fog. Later, Jiro casts the deciding vote to let Fuurouta join the Bureau. Five years later, Fuurouta is attacked by a grown-up Campe, who turned out to be the green bug he rescued from before. However, after his actions she became the last of the Tartaros Bugmen alive while the politicians who destroyed their forest habitat went unpunished. Jiro appears and talks Campe down from attacking a remorseful Fuurouta. As she leaves, Fuurouta cries that the black-and-white world he thought he knew became more complicated.
3	3	"An Iron Couple"; Transliteration: "Tekkotsu no Hito" (Japanese: 鉄骨のひと)	Osamu Kamei	Shō Aikawa	Yūdai Kubota	18 October 2015
Haneda Airport recovers from what seems like a terrorist bomb attack, though no threat or demand was sent. Detective Shiba suspects superhuman involvement, but all the evidence is taken from the Tokyo Metropolitan Police by the Superhuman Bureau, so Shiba tries following a lead to Yatsuka Heavy Industries. Along the way, Shiba meets a girl named Mieko, but quickly discovers that she is a robot as the Superhuman Bureau intervenes and Shiba is caught in an explosion. While Shiba recovers at the Bureau, Professor Hitoyoshi mentions that Mieko was the "female" half of a human-looking robot pair, programmed to seek out a "male" counterpart to form a large explosive in enemy territory. Jiro wants to capture Mieko alive, but Shiba and others at the Bureau want the robot destroyed to prevent an explosion in a populated area. Despite Jiro's efforts, Shiba takes matters into his own hands, but Mieko decides to jump into a reservoir and self-destruct without killing anyone. Five years later, Shiba attacks a military truck escorting a male prisoner and frees him. He discovered that the man was the male robot of the pair, and that Mieko did not actually self-destruct but merely slept at the bottom of the reservoir before it was drained for urban development. Shiba commands the male robot to merge with Mieko for the sake of his terrorist plot, until Jiro appears and inserts a chip into her frame. As the male and female robots merge, they decide not to follow Shiba's command. Enraged, Shiba beats up the merged robot, and then turns his anger on Jiro.
4	4	"Japan "Beast" History, Part 1"; Transliteration: "Nippon "Kaijū"-shi Zenpen" (Japanese: 日本『怪獣』史 前篇)	Son Seung-heui	Shō Aikawa	Tomoyuki Kurokawa	25 October 2015
Shortly after the incident with Grosse Augen, beast (kaiju) attacks are on the rise across Japan, though there are ample numbers of superhumans to deal with them. Fuurouta discovers that one of his friends is secretly feeding a tiny beast called GaGon, and through him the Superhuman Bureau meet up with "Beastly Radio Wave", a small group of peaceful beast enthusiasts. However, Jiro soon discovers that the radio group is actually using GaGon to clone several giant beasts for their own purposes. One of the beasts grabs Jiro, forcing him to unleash the locks holding in his own superhuman power as he burns the radio station to a crisp.
5	5	"Japan "Beast" History, Part 2"; Transliteration: "Nippon "Kaijū"-shi Gohen" (Japanese: 日本『怪獣』史 後篇)	Tomoyuki Kurokawa	Shō Aikawa	Tomoyuki Kurokawa, Hitoshi Nanba, (Note: Credited under the pen name "Namimi Sanjō" (三條 なみみ, Sanjō Namimi).); Ken Ōtsuka, Seiji Mizushima	1 November 2015
The Superhuman Bureau infiltrates a nearby college as students plan to march in support of the beasts and against what they see as their cruel use as weapons by the bigger countries. However, the protesters are manipulated by beast fanatics. While reviving an American-sent beast using GaGon's cells, one of them injects Jiro with a similar drug that causes him to go on a violent rampage in Equus, later stopped by the revived beast, MegaGon. As MegaGon leads the protesters through the streets, the heads of the Superhuman Bureau devise a plan to use a fuel train derailment to incinerate the beast. Kikko, afraid of the possible collateral damage, tries to stop MegaGon before the train crashes, but Daishi possesses the oil-filled cars himself and crashes them into MegaGon, sending him into a mindless rage. As Jiro faces him with Equus, he starts questioning the true nature of the beasts.
6	6	"They are Always Laughing"; Transliteration: "Yatsura wa Itsu demo Waratteru" (Japanese: やつらはいつでも笑ってる)	Tōru Yoshida	Shō Aikawa	Tōru Yoshida	8 November 2015
A quartet of comedic rock stars called "Mountain Horse" unexpectedly gain superhuman powers after listening to a rock concert they opened for. The powers themselves are not very strong, but enough that they get noticed by Fuurouta of the Superhuman Bureau, and a publicity agent named Fugimoto. After overhearing Fugimoto's plan to sell chocolate with an experimental anti-superhuman chemical inside, the group decides to infiltrate the warehouse and destroy the chocolate before its distribution, though they have to fight against a giant security robot and a rival superhuman rock band. After one of them gets killed in the fight, the band successfully destroys the chocolate, and keeps one sample as insurance against Fugimoto. Despite Fuurouta and Jiro's offer the remaining band members decide not to join the Superhuman Bureau, and instead continue going on stage as a comedy group.
7	7	"Go Beyond the Sky and Stars"; Transliteration: "Sora mo Hoshi mo Koeteikō" (Japanese: 空も星も越えていこう)	Takanori Yano	Shō Aikawa	Susumu Kudō	15 November 2015
Superhuman Judas, or Hikaru Misumi, was part of the armed robbery group Diamond Eater, but had a change of heart after being defeated by Human Satellite Earth-chan. After being released from prison, Hikaru is registered in the Superhuman Bureau, and decides to protect the activities of young people like him. However, the extreme actions of Earth-chan, who reacts to the brain waves of people calling for help, become recognized by society as absolute justice. During the student protest at Haneda Airport against Japan's participation in the Earth Defense Corps, Earth-chan appears while she is guarding the Prime Minister.
8	8	"Nobody knows about the Rainbow Knight"; Transliteration: "Tenkyū Naito o Dare mo Shiranai" (Japanese: 天弓ナイトをだれもしらない)	Tomo Ōkubo	Shō Aikawa	Ken Ōtsuka	22 November 2015
The Secret Detective Team BL led by Yumihiko Otonashi refuses superhuman registration and has continued to act on their own with a massive robot named Gigander Seven. Then, Yumihiko receives a notice saying the evil superhuman Lucifer's Eyes will steal superhuman Rainbow Knight's "Crescent Gun" from a collector. Rainbow Knight is a popular superhuman who gave hope to Japan after the war, and Jiro too holds dearly an experience where he was saved by Rainbow Knight. However, Rainbow Knight, the hero of justice, has been labeled as the culprit of the "Otetsu Kidnapping", and there was a conspiracy theory regarding the death involved...
9	9	"End of the Endless Family"; Transliteration: "Hateshinaki Kazoku no Hate" (Japanese: 果てしなき家族の果て)	Son Seung-heui	Masaki Tsuji	Tōru Yoshida	29 November 2015
Housewife Sanae Hatakeyama and her family of six live in the antique shop "Mori-no-ya." Her husband Minoru was the first Japanese prisoner when war broke out with the U.S., and close to 30 years had passed without his return. The seemingly ordinary Hatakeyama family had survived a great disaster that occurred at a nearby chemical plant, and had also been witnessed several times over the years with the exact same family members. Therefore, there were suspicions that they were immortal superhumans. After the Superhuman Bureau gets curious about the family, Fuurouta and the others start on a secret investigation. But then, Sanae receives word that Minoru is returning.
10	10	"Mirage of Destiny"; Transliteration: "Unmei no Gen'ei" (Japanese: 運命の幻影)	Osamu Kamei	Shō Aikawa	Osamu Kamei	6 December 2015
Infernal Queen is a fanatical organization that ruthlessly kills everyone from politicians to criminals if deemed evil by the organization. Their scientifically almighty mothership IQ has flown from the American continent to Japan, where the Superhuman Bureau is, and started executing criminals. Suspicion is placed on Hyouma as he looks like the leader of IQ, and the masked Public Security Force Chief Shakko comes to the Superhuman Bureau. Are the same two people existing at the same time? Hidden behind the mystery was the secret of Jaguar, or Hyouma, that absolutely cannot be shared with others.
11	11	"Justice / Freedom / Peace"; Transliteration: "Masayoshi/ Jiyū/ Heiwa" (Japanese: 正義/自由/平和)	Shō Ōmachi	Shō Aikawa	Tomoyuki Kurokawa, Seiji Mizushima, Hitoshi Nanba	13 December 2015
Along with the return of the Ogasawara Islands, the U.S. Navy's state-of-the-art submarine Antares will be coming to Yokosuka. Students flock to the port in order to see the show by the popular group "Angel Stars." Then radical superhumans hiding amongst the crowd start to protest, and there is chaos after musical notes materialize in sync with the performance. And then, a superhuman calling himself Wonder Sword Claude slices the submarine in half and starts to uncover the terrifying secret hidden inside Antares.
12	12	"Hakko Superhuman Crash Incident"; Transliteration: "Yakou Choujin Tsuiraku Jiken" (Japanese: 八高超人墜落事件)	Takanori Yano	Shō Aikawa	Satomi Nakamura	20 December 2015
Murders targeting doctors and nurses have taken place in Sapporo. During the investigation of SPR children who manipulate magic and science, it is revealed that superhumans are used as guinea pigs for a horrible experiment. What is the goal of Wonder Sword Claude who is suspected as the mastermind? Kikko visits the Municipal Hakko High School when the heroic superhuman Galboi Riker who flew from the Soviet comes falling down in a horrid state. The students get a testimony saying he was shot down by the Self-Defense Force and the American superhuman Master Ultima, and rise up against the tyranny of the government.
13	13	"Riots in Shinjuku"; Transliteration: "Shinjuku Jōran" (Japanese: 新宿擾乱)	Tomo Ōkubo, Seiji Mizushima (3D)	Shō Aikawa	Tomoki Kyoda, Hitoshi Nanba, Tomoyuki Kurokawa, Seiji Mizushima	27 December 2015
The youth who had awakened to superhuman powers have shifted their sense of justice towards anti-war, anti-America, and anti-establishment, leading them to be called "Superhumanists." Human experimentation and at the Ogasawara Islands and governmental use of superhuman powers come to light. The enraged students rise up for a large-scale protest in Shinjuku, Tokyo in order to realize a "Superhuman Revolution." Jiro gets into action as well, to make Kikko back to normal after she transforms into the queen of the demon world. While Wonder Sword Claude works in stealth, will Jiro be able to follow through with his ideal of "Protect all superhumans"?

===== Season 2: The Last Song (2016) =====
No. overall	No. in season	Title	Directed by	Written by	Storyboarded by	Original release date
14	1	"The Superhumans of November"; Transliteration: "11Gatsu no Chō Hitotachi" (Japanese: 十一月の超人達)	Naoki Hishikawa	Shō Aikawa	Hitoshi Nanba	3 April 2016
15	2	"The Ones Who Look Into Space"; Transliteration: "Uchū o Nozomu Mono" (Japanese: 宇宙を臨むもの)	Tomo Ōkubo	Shō Aikawa	Ken Ōtsuka	10 April 2016
16	3	"Calling Your Name in the Town of Flowers"; Transliteration: "Hanasaku Machi ni Kiminonawoyobu" (Japanese: 花咲く町に君の名を呼ぶ)	Fumio Maezono	Kazuki Nakashima	Shinji Ishihira	17 April 2016
17	4	"Devila and Devilo"; Transliteration: "Debira to Debiro" (Japanese: デビラとデビロ)	Takanori Yano	Masaki Tsuji	Yoshiharu Ashino	24 April 2016
18	5	"Canada Goldenrod"; Transliteration: "Seitakāwadachisō" (Japanese: セイタカアワダチソウ)	Kazuo Miyake	Shō Aikawa	Tomoyuki Kurokawa	1 May 2016
19	6	"Iron Mask Arrives"; Transliteration: "Suizan Nari Tekkamen" (Japanese: 推参なり鐵假面)	Son Seung-heui	Shō Aikawa	Hitoshi Nanba	8 May 2016
20	7	"The Never-Ending Battle"; Transliteration: "Owari Naki Tatakai" (Japanese: 終わりなき戦い)	Tomo Ōkubo	Gen Urobuchi	Tomo Ōkubo	15 May 2016
21	8	"Steel Ogre"; Transliteration: "Kōtetsu no Oni" (Japanese: 鋼鉄の鬼)	Naoki Hishikawa	Shō Aikawa	Ken Ōtsuka	22 May 2016
22	9	"The Age of Giant Gods"; Transliteration: "Kyoshin-tachi no Jidai" (Japanese: 巨神たちの時代)	Tomoyuki Kurokawa	Shō Aikawa	Seiji Mizushima, Tomoyuki Kurokawa, Yasushi Muraki	29 May 2016
23	10	"Beast and Maiden"; Transliteration: "Kaijū to Shojo" (Japanese: 怪獣と処女(おとめ))	Kazuo Miyake, Takanori Yano	Shō Aikawa	Shinji Ishihira	10 June 2016
24	11	"Can you still sing?" Transliteration: "Kimi wa Mada Utaeru Ka" (Japanese: 君はまだ歌えるか)	Tomo Ōkubo, Naoki Hishikawa	Shō Aikawa	Tomoyuki Kurokawa, Ken Ōtsuka, Shinji Ishihira, Kō Matsuo, Seiji Mizushima	17 June 2016

=== Light novels ===
Two supplemental light novels have been created for the series.

Superhuman Phantasmagoria: Shinka Year 36 (超人幻想神化三六年, Chōjin Gensō Shinka Sanjūrokunen), also written by Shō Aikawa, was published by Hayakawa Publishing on September 17, 2015. Set five years before the start of the anime, the novel focuses on television director and scriptwriter Katsuma Kisara, who gets caught in a time loop during the broadcast of the children's puppet show he directs.

A novel starring Kikko Hoshino and her sister, titled Concrete Revolutio: Superhuman Phantasmagoria: Hoshino Kikko's Dangerous Matchmaking Date! (コンクリート・レボルティオ : 超人幻想 : 星野輝子のキケンなお見合い!), was published by Kodansha on April 28, 2016. It was written by Aki Kanehiro.

=== Manga ===
A manga adaptation with art by Nylon began serialization in the September 2015 issue of Kadokawa Shoten's Young Ace magazine. An omnibus edition was published in North America by Seven Seas Entertainment on 27 June 2017.

No.	Japanese release date	Japanese ISBN
1	26 October 2015	978-4-04-103670-9
2	6 August 2016	978-4-04-103934-2

== Reception ==
Nick Creamer of Anime News Network praised the show as a "rousing exploration of the nature of justice in the context of post-war Japan" and celebrated its vivid art style, but found that the narrative composition could occasionally be confusing.

Writing for CBR, Timothy Blake Donohoo compared the series' focus on superheroes and national politics to Watchmen. He found that the frequent flashbacks and flashforwards hampered character development and were not worth the added complexity, but found the other aspects of the writing to be strong.

Chris Beveridge of The Fandom Post praised the animation and the mix of various sci-fi and supernatural elements, while criticizing the storytelling and characters for being difficult to connect with.

The Encyclopedia of Science Fiction described Concrete Revolutio as a complex, ambitious and ultimately impressive anime, despite criticizing some unsuccessful storylines, middling characterization and occasionally unsubtle messaging. It highlighted the series' use of superheroes and other superhumans to examine social and political issues in postwar Japan, including corruption, student unrest, relations with the United States and questions surrounding the relationship between law, morality and justice. The encyclopedia also noted its engagement with historical subjects such as Unit 731 and American imperialism, while identifying Alan Moore's Watchmen as an important influence and the nature of justice as a recurring theme.
