= Pushback =

Pushback may refer to:

- Pushback (aviation), a vehicle for towing airplanes
- Pushback (migration), any measure aimed at forcing migrants to return over a border
- Backlash (disambiguation)
