= Environmental Protection Agency (Sweden) =

Swedish government agency

Naturvårdsverket's coat of arms.

The Swedish Environmental Protection Agency (Swedish: Naturvårdsverket), formerly the National Swedish Environment Protection Board (Swedish: Statens naturvårdsverk) is a government agency in Sweden responsible for proposing and implementing environmental policies. It was founded in 1967 and reports to the Swedish Ministry of the Environment.

== Environmental Quality Objectives ==
The following is a summary of Sweden's Sixteen Environmental Quality Objectives (verbatim from the Agency's own website, July 2008.):

- Reduced climate impact
- Clean air
- Natural acidification only
- A non-toxic environment
- A protective ozone layer
- A safe radiation environment
- Zero eutrophication
- Flourishing lakes and streams
- Good-quality groundwater
- A balanced marine environment
- Thriving wetlands
- Sustainable forests
- A varied agricultural landscape
- A magnificent mountain landscape
- A good built environment
- A rich diversity of plant and animal life

== Nature photographer of the year ==
Each year, the Swedish Environmental Protection Agency names a Swedish photographer "Nature Photographer of the Year".

- 1990 — Tore Hagman
- 1991 — Per Klaesson
- 1992 — Ingmar Holmåsen
- 1993 — Sven Gillsäter
- 1994 — Gerry Johansson
- 1995 — Bertil Pettersson
- 1996 — Claes Grundsten
- 1997 — Jan-Peter Lahall
- 1998 — Peter Gerdehag
- 1999 — Hans Strand
- 2000 — no one selected
- 2001 — Staffan Widstrand
- 2002 — Inge Lennmark
- 2003 — Jan Töve
- 2004 — Lars Bygdemark
- 2005 — Brutus Östling
- 2006 — Helene Schmitz
- 2007 — Lennart Nilsson
- 2008 — Mireille de la Lez
- 2009 — Serkan Günes
- 2010 — withdrawn (Note: Terje Hellesø first received the award but it was later revoked due to photo manipulation.)
- 2011 — Jan Grahn
- 2012 — Johan Hallmén
- 2013 — Jonna och Tammy Bergström
- 2014 — Göran Ekström
- 2015 — Erik Johansson
- 2016 — Mats Andersson
- 2017 — Roine Magnusson
- 2018 — Johan Hammar
- 2019 — Peter Hanneberg
- 2020 — Jörgen Wiklund
