= Tae Okajima =

Japanese voice actress

- 岡嶋 妙
- Born: Kagawa Prefecture, Japan
- Other name: Soyogi Tōno
- Occupation: Voice actress
- Agent: Kenyu Office
- Notable work: Kotonoha Katsura in School Days; Anzu Yukimura in Da Capo II

Tae Okajima (岡嶋 妙, Okajima Tae; born October 2 in Kagawa Prefecture) is a Japanese voice actress who works for Kenyu Office. She is also known as Soyogi Tōno (遠野そよぎ, Tōno Soyogi) for her roles in visual novels and OVAs.

Her major roles include Kotonoha Katsura in School Days. Anzu Yukimura in Da Capo II, Hakuryu in Saiyuki Reload, and Chokaku in Koihime Musō.

== Filmography ==
=== Anime ===
List of voice performances in anime
Year	Title	Role	Notes	Source
2003	Saiyuki Reload	Hakuryu		
2004	Saiyuki Reload Gunlock	Hakuryu		
2004	Onmyō Taisenki	Inaei Fumi 稲永フミ		
2005	MÄR	Female		
2005	He Is My Master	Second-year girl		
2005	Hell Girl	Akane's mother		
2006	Ballad of a Shinigami	Kanako		
2006	Strawberry Panic	Mizuki Takakura		
2006	Gift	Schoolgirl		
2007	School Days	Kotonoha Katsura	Also OVAs in 2008	
2007	Happy Happy Clover	Meru / Mallow		
2007–08	Da Capo II	Anzu Yukimura	Also Second Season	
2007	Bamboo Blade	Sato		
2008	Blue Dragon	Son 坊ちゃん		
2009	Chi's Sweet Home: Chi's New Address	Mayu-chan / break even マユちゃん/トントン		
2009	Fight Ippatsu! Jūden-chan!!	Sweetie Milly		
2009	Aki Sora	Kana Sumiya	OVA	
2010	Bakugan Battle Brawlers New Vestroy	Maron Lelttoy		
2010	Koihime Musō	Chōkaku		
2010	Yosuga no Sora	Motoka Nogisaka		
2011	We Without Wings	Misaki Hayashida		

=== Video games ===
List of voice performances in video games
Year	Title	Role	Notes	Source
2004	Saiyuki Reload	Hakuryu	PS1/PS2	
2005–14	School Days games	Kotonoha Katsura	Also as Soyogi Tōno	
2005	Tales of Commons	You	Mobile phone	
2006–11	Da Capo II	Anzu Yukimura	PC Adult, Also as Soyogi Tōno	
2007	Tōka Gettan	Momoka Kawakabe, Sei	PC Adult, As Soyogi Tōno	
2007	eXceed 3rd - JADE PENETRATE -	Rain Lindwurm	As Endō Saya	
2008–14	We Without Wings games	Misaki Hayashida	PC Adult, As Soyogi Tōno	
2008	Princess Lover!	Ayano Kaneko	PC Adult, Also as Soyogi Tōno	
2008	Haruiro Ouse	Konoha Sakuragi	PC Adult, As Soyogi Tōno	
2008	Yosuga no Sora	Motoka Nogisaka	PC Adult, As Soyogi Tōno	
2008–10	Koihime Muso	Chōkaku	PC Adult, As Soyogi Tōno	
2009	Flyable Heart	Minase Sakurako	PC Adult, As Soyogi Tōno	
2009–13	Stellar Theater	Fujisaki Amane	As Soyogi Tōno	
2009	eXceed 3rd - JADE PENETRATE - BLACK PACKAGE	Rayne Lindwurm	As Endō Saya	
2010	Iro ni Ide ni Keri Waga Koi wa	Misono Misono	PC Adult, As Soyogi Tōno	
2010	Jinki Extend Re: Vision	Ryoko Shima	PC Adult, As Soyogi Tōno	
2011	Aiyoku no Eustia	Saint Irene	PC Adult, As Soyogi Tōno, also sequel in 2014	
2012	If My Heart Had Wings	Hibari Habane	PC Adult, As Soyogi Tōno	
