= Backflash =

Backflash may refer to:

- "Backflash" (Boss), a television episode
- "Backflash" (High Maintenance), a television episode
- Backflash, a 1998 Parker novel by Richard Stark (Donald E. Westlake)
- Backflash, a 2001 film featuring Robert Patrick
- "Backflash", an instrumental by Pink Cream 69 from Games People Play, 1993

== See also ==
- Haplochromis sp. 'backflash cryptodon', a species of fish
- Backlash (disambiguation)
- Black Flash, a DC Comics supervillain
- Blacklash or Whiplash, a Marvel Comics character
- Flashback (disambiguation)
