= Flashback Records (disambiguation) =

Flashback Records is an independent record store and label in London.

Flashback Records may also refer to:

- Flashback Media Group, a Swedish media company
- Flashback Records (Bell), a 45 RPM/single oldies label and subsidiary of Bell Records and its successor Arista Records
- Rhino Flashback, a budget reissue label owned by Warner Music Group through Rhino Records
