= Haruiro Ouse =

2008 video game

- Developer(s): Purple software
- Platform(s): Windows
- Release: JP: July 31, 2008
- Genre(s): Drama, Romance, Eroge, Visual novel
- Mode(s): Single-player

Haruiro Ouse (春色桜瀬) is a Japanese visual novel developed by Purple software and was first released for Windows on July 31, 2008. The gameplay in Haruiro Ouse follows a plot line which offers pre-determined scenarios with courses of interaction, and focuses on the appeal of the five female main characters.

== Story ==
Riku Okita commutes to school everyday, always passing a cherry blossom tree that has a legend about it; if a boy and a girl met under it, they would fall in love. One day in spring, he encounters a girl in her school's uniform under the tree. There, she tells him that he'll fall in love with her.

== Characters ==
A typical scene in the visual novel. This is a scene depicting Konoha, Suzuran, and Ayano.

- Riku Okita (沖田 陸, Okita Riku)

The game's protagonist. His parents on a business trip abroad, while he lives at home with his younger sister, Ayano.

- Konoha Sakuragi (桜木 このは, Sakuragi Konoha)

Voiced by
Soyogi Tono

- Nadeshiko Aisawa (愛沢 撫子, Aisawa Nadeshiko)

Voiced by
Chikage Sawada

- Suzuran ・Ku-deruhaitsu ・Aono (青野・クーデルハイツ・鈴蘭)

Voiced by
Kana Nojima

- Kikyou Sugawara (菅原 桔梗, Sugawara Kikyou)

Voiced by
Kazene

- Haruna Okazaki (岡崎 春奈, Okazaki Haruna)

Voiced by
Mirika Sawano

- Ayano Okita (沖田 綾乃, Okita Ayano)

Voiced by
Miru

- Satsuki Sugawara (菅原 皐月, Sugawara Satsuki)

Voiced by
Hinata Ayukawa

== Reception ==
Haruiro Ouse was ranked 18th in the System category, 8th in Movie, and 16th in Vocal in Getchu.com's 2008 game ranking. It was Getchu's 16th best selling game released that year.
