= Aiyoku no Eustia =

2011 adult visual novel video game

- Aiyoku no Eustia box art

穢翼のユースティア (Aiyoku no Yūsutia)
- Genre: Action, Drama, Romance, Supernatural
- Video game
- Developer: August
- Publisher: Hazuki (Windows); Dramatic Create (PS Vita); ENTERGRAM (Switch, PS4)
- Genre: Eroge, Visual novel
- Platform: Windows, PlayStation Vita
- Released: April 28, 2011 (Windows); June 26, 2014 (PS Vita); June 23, 2022 (Switch, PS4)
- Novel series
- Written by: Sasa Miyachiruda
- Published by: Harvest
- Original run: November 25, 2011 – June 20, 2012
- Volumes: 5
- Audio drama
- Produced by: Geneon Universal
- Original run: October 26, 2011 – August 10, 2012
- Episodes: 6
- Novel

Aiyoku no Eustia: Auld Lang Syne
- Written by: Okita Kazuhiko
- Published by: Paradigm
- Published: December 22, 2011
- Manga
- Written by: August
- Illustrated by: Monaco Sena
- Published by: Kadokawa Shoten
- Magazine: Comp Ace
- Original run: June 2012 – August 2013
- Volumes: 2

Aiyoku no Eustia (穢翼のユースティア, Aiyoku no Yūsutia; lit. "Eustia of the Tarnished Wings") is a Japanese adult visual novel developed by August for Windows and was released on April 28, 2011. Aiyoku no Eustia is August's eighth game, preceded by Fortune Arterial and Yoake Mae yori Ruriiro na: Moonlight Cradle. It was planned to be released on March 25, but the schedule was changed due to the Great East Japan earthquake. An enhanced port for the PlayStation Vita titled Aiyoku no Eustia: Angel's Blessing was released on June 26, 2014. The game was released exclusively in Japan for the Nintendo Switch and PlayStation 4 on June 23, 2022. Two manga volumes based on Aiyoku no Eustia were published by Kadokawa Shoten. Novels, comic anthologies, and drama CDs have also been released.

The title is a play on words: the actual Kanji used are ai (穢, dirty) and yoku (翼, wing), rendering the primary meaning of "Eustia of the Tarnished Wings". However, aiyoku is a homonym in Japanese, and also means "worldly passion" or "lust" (愛欲). Accordingly, the alternate reading is "Eustia of Passion", which is an allusion to events within the game.

== Plot ==
After the surface of the world succumbed to chaos centuries ago, the city of "Novus Aither" (ノーヴァス アイテル, Novasu Aiteru) is kept afloat in the sky solely by the continual prayers offered by the Saint. Years ago, when the Saint's prayer was interrupted, an incident known as the "Gran Forte" occurred, causing a portion of the land to fall and split the lower city into two, separated by a cliff. Countless lives and property were lost or irreversibly affected in what would be known as the greatest disaster in the city's history.

In time, the lowest layer, known as the "Prison", became the home to people who lost much of their former lives during the "Gran Forte". Crime, famine, and disease run rampant, with "The Noncorroding Gold Chains", the ruling organization in the area specializing in the sex trade, keeping what little order that still exists. Meanwhile, a contagious disease that causes the infected to grow wings has spread throughout the city, and a unit commonly known as the "Wing Hunters" has been formed to deal with these people swiftly and often violently.

In this "Prison" resides Caim Astraea, a freelance ex-assassin who does odd jobs for his friend, the head of "The Noncorroding Gold Chains", for money. During one request, Caim finds Eustia, a winged girl who emits the pale purple light characteristic of the "Gran Forte" incident years ago. His encounter with Eustia will take him on a journey that will involve him with the most influential bodies of the city, including the Church and the royal government. As he searches for the meaning to his cruel, difficult life, he will discover the deepest and darkest secrets of Novus Aither.

== Characters ==
=== Main heroines ===
Eustia Astraea
Voiced by: Shiho Moriho (video game), Yoshino Nanjo (Drama CD, PS Vita), Honoka Mugihata (collab)
The title character. Eustia (or Tia as she is usually called) is found by Caim as the only survivor of a grisly murder scene. An orphan for as long as she could remember, Tia grew up under harsh conditions, having worked as a slave for a noble family before being sold to the Golden Chains in "Prison" as a prostitute. She is found to have the wing disease, although her wings are markedly different from the others; it is quickly revealed that Tia is a special winged case and may possess supernatural powers.
Eris Floralia
Voiced by: Kiyomi Shinomiya (video game), Yuu Asakawa (Drama CD, PS Vita)
The only female doctor in Prison who lives and works in the prostitute area. She was redeemed (purchased so that she did not have to work as a prostitute) by Caim and, as a result, became totally devoted to him. She is noted for her beauty and intelligence, but is also well known for her sharp tongue and cold personality, which only Caim is spared from. Caim wants nothing more than for Eris to treasure her freedom and live independently; Eris, however, wants nothing more than to be with and serve Caim.
Saint Irene
Voiced by: Soyogi Tōno (video game), Tae Okajima (Drama CD, PS Vita)
The current Saint, Irene the 29th, is gifted with a way with words and incredible strength of faith. Originally a homeless girl, she met Lavria, who would become a sister figure to her, on the streets. The Church would eventually take them both under its wing; she was selected to be the new Saint, to offer constant prayer on behalf of everyone in Novus Aether, after Irene the 28th was executed for interrupting her prayer and causing the "Gran Forte".
Licia de novus Yurii
Voiced by: Yuzuha Ebihara (video game), Eriko Nakamura (Drama CD, PS Vita)
The current princess of Novus Aether and successor to the throne, Licia, is a young, mischievous girl with little interest in the politics of her country, leaving the decision-making to the House of Nobles and its head, Gilbert. She is, however, very interested in what the "Prison" and the lower city are like (though she is terribly misinformed in this matter) and loves to do servant work such as hanging laundry and cooking.
Fione Silvaria
Voiced by: Sakura Tachibana (video game), Yuka Saito (Drama CD, PS Vita)
The captain of the "Wing Hunters" Fione, is a skilled swordswoman who has a very strong sense of responsibility and justice, and as such, she clings on very strongly to her beliefs, which makes her come off as stubborn and inflexible. Her idealism often tends to clash with Caim's cynicism.

=== Supporting characters ===
Caim Astraea
Voiced by: Keizo Oishi (video game), Takashi Kondō (Drama CD, PS Vita)
The main protagonist. He lost all of his friends and family in the Gran Forte and was taken in by the then head of the Golden Chain, who had him trained as an assassin. He eventually earned his freedom and now works as a freelancer, his primary client being the now head of the Golden Chain, Sieg, his closest friend, who is something of a brother to him as they were more or less raised together in the Golden Chain by Sieg's father, the former head. Despite still mainly working for the Golden Chain, he no longer takes on jobs where he has to kill. His training as an assassin has made him an extremely competent fighter, and his life in Prison has made him cynical and pragmatic. His initial interest in Eustia is sparked by the light she gave off when he first saw her, a light he had only seen before during the Gran Forte.
Lucius dis Mireille
Voiced by: Yasuhiro Okino (video game), Hiroki Takahashi (Drama CD, PS Vita)
A young noble and overseer of the "Wing Hunters" who has quickly gained recognition and power among the governing nobles. He is concerned with the corruption of the government and diligently works to improve the lives of all citizens of Novus Aether.
Siegfried Grado
Voiced by: Shikiji (video game), Shinichiro Miki (Drama CD, PS Vita)
The current leader of the "Gold Chains", son of the creator and previous leader, and Caim's close friend. The two of them share a long past, having worked as assassins and escaped from countless dangers together. He's usually laid back around Caim, Melt, and Eris, but as the leader of the Gold Chains, he is serious, efficient, and ruthless.
Melt Logtie
Voiced by: Anna Akashi (video game), Junko Asami (Drama CD, PS Vita)
A wildly successful prostitute in her day, the previous leader of the "Gold Chains" eventually bought her for himself. She now runs a bar and restaurant that Caim and Siegfried both regularly visit on Prostitute Street in the "Prison".
Sistina Uyl
Voiced by: Kikka Ai (video game), Hana Takeda (Drama CD, PS Vita)
Sistina is Lucius's adjutant.
Lavria
Voiced by: Hana Kiritani (video game), Atsumi Tanezaki (Drama CD, PS Vita)
St. Irene the 29th's personal servant, Lavria, is a timid girl who is torn between supporting St. Irene's beliefs and obeying the orders of the Church ministers to keep St. Irene in check.
Claudia
Voiced by: Fūka (video game), Yukari Honma (Drama CD, PS Vita)
Currently the Golden Chain's most popular prostitute, she is beautiful, gentle, and graceful, but known for being sadistic when working.
Risa
Voiced by: Būke Hanataba (video game), Saki Nakajima (Drama CD, PS Vita)
Another prostitute of the Golden Chains. She is friends with Claudia and Iris and has a very cheerful and energetic personality.
Iris
Voiced by: Saori Yukito (video game), Ai Fukuda (Drama CD, PS Vita)
Another prostitute of the Golden Chains. She is young and has a fragile appearance, which contrasts sharply with her personality as she casually insults people and uses foul language in a nearly unchanging monotone.
Gau Lugeira
Voiced by: Erena Kaibara (video game), Hyo-Sei (Drama CD, PS Vita)
Gau is a superior swordswoman.
Lang Scrope
Voiced by: Kazuya Sugisaki (video game), Kisho Taniyama (Drama CD, PS Vita)
Lang is a vice-leader of Fione's corps.
Nudar Atraid
Voiced by: Noroyuki (video game), Noriaki Sugiyama (Drama CD, PS Vita)
Nudar is the head priest/bishop of the church of Saint Irene.
Varrius Meisner
Voiced by: Kazuya Ichijō (video game, Drama CD, PS Vita)
Varrius is the captain of the Palace Guard.
Gilbert dis Balstein
Voiced by: Ichiban Nagahama (video game), Keiji Fujiwara (Drama CD, PS Vita)
Gilbert is the top administrator of "Novus Aither".
Oz
Voiced by: Bifu Hitoshi (video game, Drama CD, PS Vita)
Oz is Siegfried's confidant.
Cougar Silvaria
Voiced by: Daijirō Kataoka (video game), Yasunori Matsumoto (Drama CD, PS Vita)
Cougar is Fione's older brother.
Bernado
Voiced by: Yūto Mutsuki (video game), Unknown (Drama CD)
Bernado is a leader of "Fūshō". Bernado was a vice-leader of "Fushokukinsa".

== Media ==
=== Manga ===
A manga adaptation entitled Aiyoku no Eustia was published by Kadokawa Shoten in June 2012. The manga was written by August and illustrated by Monaco Sena. It began serialization in an issue of the Comp Ace magazine. Two volumes have been produced. The manga series originally ran from June 2012 to August 2013. Ichijinsha has published an Aiyoku no Eustia Comic Anthology, which was released on July 25, 2011.

=== Novels ===
Harvest has publicized an Aiyoku no Eustia novel series, consisting of five volumes written by Sasa Miyachiruda. Each volume focuses on a different heroine's scenario. The first volume, Aiyoku no Eustia Kuroki Hane was published on November 25, 2011, the second volume, Aiyoku no Eustia Aoki Tsuki, was published on December 20, 2011. The third volume, Aiyoku no Eustia Shiroki Seijo, was published on February 2, 2012, and the two final volumes, Aiyoku no Eustia Kin'iro no Ōjo, and Aiyoku no Eustia Konton no Tenshi, were published on March 25, 2012, and June 20, 2012. A novel entitled Aiyoku no Eustia Auld Lang Syne, written by Okita Kazuhiko, was published by Paradigm on December 22, 2011.

=== Drama CD ===
Geneon Universal has released an audio drama series for Aiyoku no Eustia, containing six chapters. The first chapter was released on October 26, 2011, and the last chapter was released on August 10, 2012. The scenario was supervised by August staff, with each chapter focusing on the past of various characters in the story.

== Development ==
Aiyoku no Eustia is August's eighth project, which was developed after other August games such as Yoake Mae yori Ruriiro na and Fortune Arterial. The scenario for Aiyoku no Eustia was written by Taku Sakakibara. The art and character designs were handled by Bekkankō. The movie production was managed by Yuki Kitagawa, and the music was managed by a music production company called Active Planets.

=== Release history ===
On December 24, 2010, the first trial edition, Aiyoku no Eustia - Tech Gian Super Prelude, was made available on Windows, with an age rating of 15+. Two other trials were released in Japan, also, one on December 28, 2010, and the other on January 14, 2011; the age rating changed to 17+. On April 28, 2011, the first press edition was released, followed by a regular edition for Aiyoku no Eustia, which was made available on Windows in the same year, July 29. Both shared an age rating of 18+. Aiyoku no Eustia: Angel's Blessing was released for PlayStation Vita on June 26, 2014.

== Music ==
Two maxi singles were released for the opening and ending themes on April 28, 2011. The first contained the opening theme "Asphodelus" (アスフォデルス) by Ceui and the insert song "Tears of Hope" (ティアズ・オブ・ホープ). The second one contained the ending theme "Shinainaru Sekai e" (親愛なる世界へ) by Ceui and the insert song "Close My Eyes" (クローズ・マイ・アイズ) by Ami Fujisaki.

== Reception ==
Famitsu gave the PlayStation Vita version of the game a review score of 29/40.
