= Terje Hellesø =

Terje Hellesø (born 1964) is a Swedish nature photographer. In 2011, he was caught manipulating pictures of the Eurasian lynx.

== Biography ==
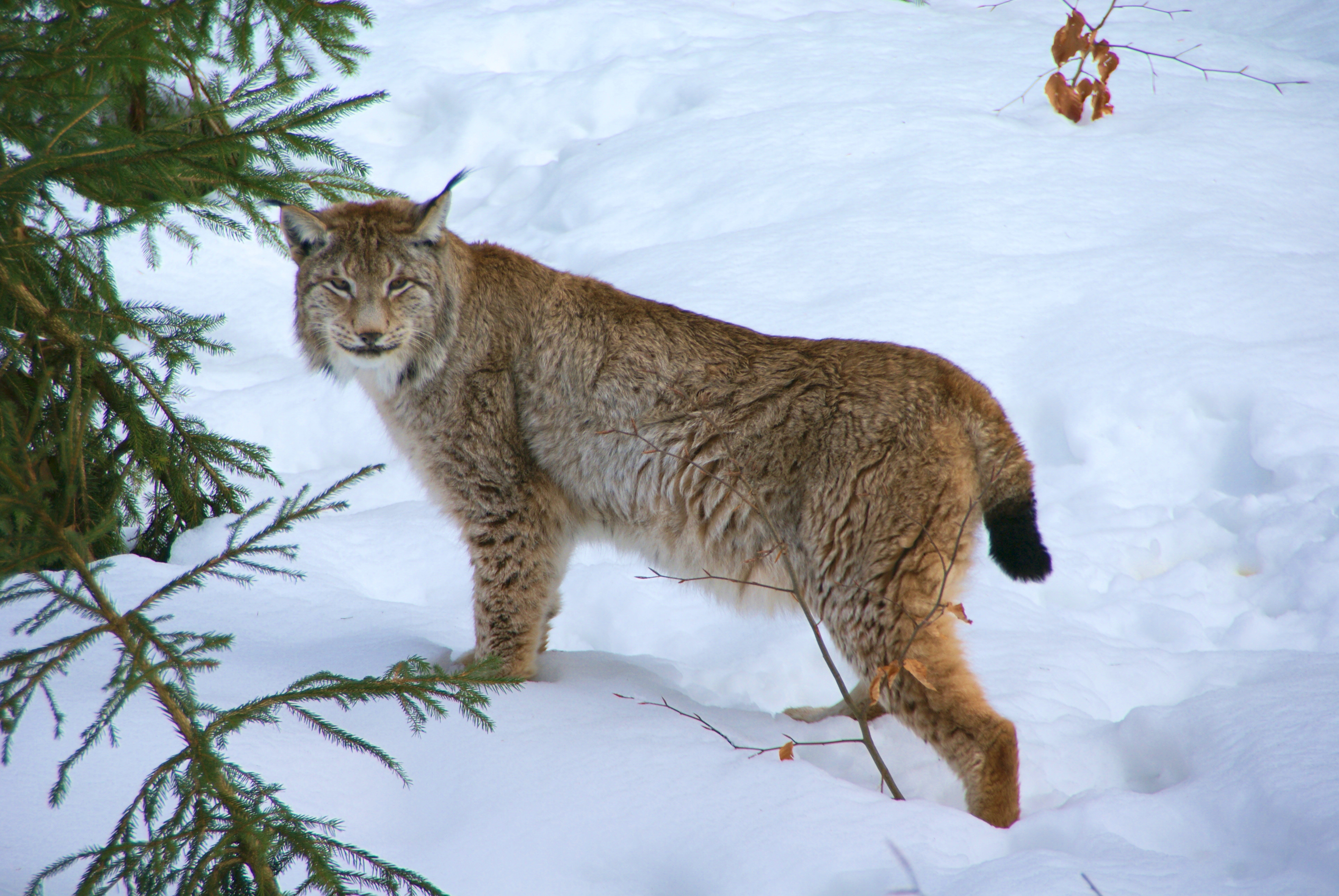
A Euroasian lynx

Terje Hellesø was born in 1964 in Bergen, Norway. He became a professional photographer at the age of 19 and was awarded Norwegian Nature Photographer of the Year in 1987.

Hellesø moved to Sweden in 1987. He relocated to Mullsjö, Sweden, and was project manager for the 2011 photo festival Mullsjö fotofestival.

Hellesø reached fame as a photographer of the Eurasian lynx. In May 2011, he was awarded the 2010 Swedish Nature Photographer of the Year by the Swedish Environmental Protection Agency. Part of the award was an solo exhibition at the Swedish Museum of Natural History and Hellesø sent a photograph to the agency for press releases.

When editors of the web forum Flashback examined the photos they found that Hellesø's images were manipulated with animals pasted into the pictures. On 2 September 2011, the editors published accusations that Hellesø had manipulated images of lynx and one of the common raccoon dog. Hellesø initially denied, but admitted on the 3 September. He confirmed that he had manipulated 93 pictures of lynx.

The publication of the invasive common raccoon dog picture, said to be photographed in Mullsjö, lead to the local game warden starting to search for the animal as it may host rabies. The County Board for Västra Götaland reported Hellesø to the police for the costs for the search.

The aliases Lodjuren, Radhusbiff, mickepickepö, conter1, hello, and legoboy of Flashback and the blog Terjade foton were awarded an honourable mention at the 2011 Guldspaden, an annual award for investigative journalism. The award Swedish Nature Photographer of the Year was later revoked, however Hellesø was to keep the award sum of 15,000 SEK and no new winner was presented.
