= List of Koihime Musō characters =

This is a list of characters from the visual novel and anime series, Koihime Musō.

All characters are loosely based on characters of the novel Romance of the Three Kingdoms and are grouped in the faction/kingdom they belong to and called by their Japanese names. Also, all of the voice actresses reprise their roles in the anime, under different names. Both names are written here.

== Protagonist ==
=== Kazuto ===
Hongō Kazuto (北郷 一刀)
Voiced by: Takahiro Mizushima (Drama CD)

Visual novel version
The main character of the visual novel series. He is a modern day Japanese student who was trained in kendo, military strategies and has pretty good knowledge about Asian History in general. He was sent back in time to ancient China when he attempted to stop a mysterious student from stealing an ancient Chinese mirror within the school's collection and ended up breaking the mirror in the process. Due to his abnormal costume (his school uniform) and manner of speech (English loanwords), he is saved by Kan'u and is mistaken to be the "Messenger from Heaven" who is said to be able to bring peace to China. He initially denied and turn down the role but later on decides to aid Kan'u in her quest, hoping to find his way back home. However, as time passes, he feels himself attached and begins to think twice about whether he should go home. He's often regarded as being too carefree and too big a skirt chaser by almost everyone.
In Shin Koihime Musō, regardless of which kingdom is chosen, Kazuto is sent to the other world when he was sleeping back in his own world. Usually before he is found, the lords of each kingdom comment how they saw a shooting star in the sky. Like in the first game, he is still considered the Messenger of Heaven.
He is often shocked as to how heroes he knows from literature are so very different from what he has learned from his time. In the first Koihime Musō game his role is akin to Ryūbi. However he takes an entirely new role in Shin Koihime Musō, as Ryūbi has become a separate character. In the sequel, Kazuto can ally himself with any one of the warring factions, becoming the main partner of either Ryūbi, Sōsō, or Sonsaku. The ending also varies depending on who he partners with.

== Shoku (蜀, Shǔ) ==
=== Kan'u ===
Kan'u Unchō (関羽 雲長; Guan Yu - Yunchang)
Real name: Aisha (愛紗; Àishā)
Voiced by: Nami Kurokawa (visual novel, anime) (credited as Mina Motoyama in the visual novel)

Visual novel version
Arguably the main heroine of the first game, Kan'u shows up shortly after Hongō is transported back in time and saves him from a group of bandits. Due to Hongō's strange attire and manner of speech, she subsequently mistakes him to be the "Messenger from Heaven" and becomes the first person to vow her loyalty to him. Kan'u remains the driving force behind the Hongō/Shoku army and displays many heroic actions in the war, often being the leading voices for the other girls as well as the motivator of the group. However, due to her past, she strongly rejects Kazuto for calling her a girl, stating, "Nothing as weak as that!". It is also noted that she easily turns dangerous, even vicious when provoked. She's completely scared of ghosts.
In Shin Koihime Musō, Kan'u is relegated to the position of Ryūbi's second in command and confidante. Here she is a very strict general and disciplinarian, especially towards Ryūbi herself (due to Ryūbi being a rather naive and reluctant queen), and Kazuto (likely out of jealousy over Ryūbi's closeness to Kazuto, since she herself in fact harbors romantic feelings towards him).
Anime version
Kan'u is known as the Beautiful Black-haired Bandit Fighter and wields the Green Dragon Crescent Blade. She is also one of the main characters beside Chōhi. Her past reveals that her family was killed by bandits, which made it her quest to ensure innocent people will never suffer like she did. She cares a lot for her friends, and she is a sister to Chōhi after they swore a vow of sisterhood because she felt sorry for Chōhi's loneliness. Two common recurring jokes about her are: 1) people who have heard the legend of the black-haired bandit fighter remark that the rumors describe her as the a most beautiful woman, and because of this did not think Kan'u was her and 2) some of the female characters mistakenly believe she and Rinrin are mother and daughter despite the fact she is still young. The second running gag is carried even further in Shin Koihime Musō when Kōsonsan mistakes Kōmei as Kan'u's daughter as well. Somewhat self-conscious of her appearance, she often finds herself as the butt of jokes to those who blatantly point out physical aspects of her, such as her age, which she is very sensitive of. Another notable gag was when Kan'u seemingly found a suitable male soulmate, the relationship was to be very short-lived. She is a pure virgin, as noted in season 1's fourth episode, where she nervously admits to Karin that it was her first time when she conceded to sleep with the young ruler in exchange for Bachō's release. After having Ryūbi join them in the second season, she becomes a role model for Ryūbi who later decides to makes a vow of sisterhood with her as Kan'u's older sister (as Kan'u already made vow with Chōhi's as her older sister). Kan'u at first felt it was inappropriate as she is older than she is but by the beginning of third season, she accepted calling Ryūbi her Aneue (older sister).

=== Chōhi ===
Chōhi Yokutoku (張飛 翼徳; Zhang Fei - Yide)
Real name: Rinrin (鈴々; Lingling)
Voiced by: Miya Serizono (visual novel, anime) (credited as Hiroka Nishizawa in the anime)

Visual novel version
Chōhi joins Kazuto along with Kan'u after the two discover him together. Unlike Kan'u, who holds a more reserved master-servant-like relationship with Kazuto, she treats Kazuto like an older sibling and calls him "big brother," similar to how she treats Kan'u. As a powerful character, Chōhi has the strongest Damage ability when used as a general in the game. However, she has no defense technique when used as a commander, thus making her unfit to be one.
As a running gag, she's often grouped with Bachou as "the two who doesn't have to help in councils".
Anime version
Chōhi is a talkative and always cheerful girl. Although she is small and very smart in some things, she is naive in others, yet very powerful and strong, capable of competing against Kan'u in armed melee combat. She is one of the main characters and the first person to join Kan'u. Chōhi will also be very dedicated to her duty no matter what the cost to her (in one episode, for example, she fights bandits despite having a cold.) During the second season, she was opposed of Ryūbi of becoming Kan'u little sister as Chōhi was already made a vow with Kan'u to be her little sister but accepted when Ryūbi decides to make Kan'u her little sister instead. By the third season, she has accepted Ryūbi as her other older sister and even calling her Tōka nee-chan. She wears a hairpin in the shape of a round yellow "smiley-faced tiger" that changes expressions according to Chōhi's mood.

=== Ryūbi ===
Ryūbi Gentoku (劉備 玄徳; Liu Bei - Xuande)
Real name: Tōka (桃香; Taoxiang)
Voiced by: Oto Agumi (visual novel), Mai Gotō (anime)

Visual novel version
The young queen of Shoku Kingdom in Shin Koihime Musō. Being quite young she is naive, often reluctant to go to war, and hates paperwork (much to the chagrin of Kan'u who as a result often scolds the young queen and reminds her of her duties), but has a lot of confidence on her subordinates. She falls in love with Kazuto, causing Kan'u to feel a bit of jealousy.
Anime version
Introduced in Shin Koihime Musō. A descendant of a distinguished family who was given possession of a sword, the family heirloom, before she encountered the man who would eventually steal her name (leading everyone to believe him to be Ryūbi Gentoku in the first season) and her sword, causing her to fall into disgrace. To redeem herself, she ventures out in search for the man and her sword, which leads her to Kan'u and company, who are greatly surprised of her identity (in fact she is nearly assaulted by Kōchū, and later Bachō, upon hearing of the name Ryūbi again). After being attacked twice by bandits (and almost being raped in the second attack) while venturing alone, she concedes to Chōun's suggestion of joining their group for protection. She is revealed to be an old classmate of Kōsonsan in primary school, even though she doesn't remember Kōsonsan's real name Pairen much to the latter's disgust.
She eventually gets her sword returned to her from Enjutsu, thanks to Shokatsuryō who conned Enjutsu with a "mysterious container", in the same fashion Enjutsu herself obtained the sword from Enshō. Sadly, she loses her sword again in an effort to help defend a village from an army of attacking bandits. However, she realize her bravery to sacrifice her sword to defend the village after a lecture from Kan'u so she decides to follow her example by making a vow of sisterhood as her younger sister (contrary to the historical fact that Liu Bei is the eldest of the three) but Chōhi was against it as Chōhi was already her younger sister so instead she becomes Kan'u older sister. By the third season, she, Kan'u and Chōhi have accepted calling each other sisters. Also to her surprise, she is given a new sword, claimed by the Tōka villagers to be a "sword left by the gods".

=== Chōun ===
Chō'un Shiryū (趙雲 子龍; Zhao Yun - Zilong)
Real name: Sei (星; Xing)
Voiced by: Emi Motoi (visual novel, anime) (credited as Nana Nogami in the visual novel)

Visual novel version
When Kan'u was fighting the Tō army, she fought alongside Chōun for a while; when this war ended, Chōun met Kazuto and took a liking to him, promising to join his army later. She joins alongside Kōchū after the battle with Enshō. She has a strong obsession of menma of all kinds. Of Kazuto's harem, she can be considered "the weird one". As the (self-proclaimed) second master of love in the Three Kingdoms, she, along with Shion (who is the first), constantly give Kazuto advice in his love affairs. However, unlike Shion, she is usually straightforward and blunt, lacking much sense of shame. She also has a habit of running around the city as the masked hero of justice 'Butterfly Mask' in her patrol shift. Strangely, no one other than Kazuto and Shuri can recognize her true identity, despite only wearing a mask and her fighting style recognized. Furthermore, Chōun herself doesn't recognize how obvious her disguise is to Kazuto.Despite her seductive front, she can be surprisingly pure at times which shocks Kazuto. Unlike the other girls, she refers to Kazuto as "aruji" rather than "goshujin-sama".
Anime version
Chōun is a mysterious girl who appears calm, collected, and very powerful. She is the second person to join the group. She loves to tease Kan'u and other women frequently, and seems to relish whenever she gets up close with them. She also assumes the identity of a hero of justice named Butterfly Mask (Kachō Kamen), hence wearing a butterfly mask. Unlike in the visual novel, the majority of the characters--even Chouhi--recognized her right away.
In Shin Koihime Musō, Chō'un (in Kachō Kamen's form), saves Ryūbi from bandits with her secret technique, making Ryūbi develop a crush on Kachō Kamen. Chōun asked Ryūbi who saved her, and she 'innocently' said good things about her (Kachou Kamen is super cool, and noble), raising Chōun's mood high. Chōun is also scary when she's smiling (Sui will have nightmares about it and Shion won't let her daughter sees Chōun's smiling face). Chōun even continues teasing Kan'u in more ridiculous ways (like an embarrassing introduction of Kan'u to the bandits who attacked Ryūbi - and Chōun gets a lump on the head as a result).
In Koihime Musō's OVA, Chōun (as Kachō Kamen) appeared and swam, but Kōchū, who acted as the school's doctor, said that its okay, since Kachō Kamen's appearance looks like Chōun, and she immediately tied up and put into an unused class, until night and no one seems to notice her missing (even her daughter, who asked about her whereabouts before).

=== Bachō ===
Bachō Mōki (馬超 孟起; Ma Chao - Mengqi)
Real name: Sui (翠; Cui)
Voiced by: Mio Ōgawa (visual novel), Maki Kobayashi (anime)

Visual novel version
When her father died, she joined Kazuto's army so she can get revenge on Sōsō. She joins during the war against Enshō. She becomes extremely embarrassed when alone with a man, especially Kazuto because of his tendency to tease, making her relationship with Kazuto start off awkward in the Base Phase events. She gets better emotionally later in, even willing to forgive Sousou.
Anime version
Chōhi's friend and daughter of the late Batō who was supposedly killed by Sōsō. Although she speaks like a man, she is really a simple, straight-forward, and easily embarrassed girl. She wields a simple looking yari but is very strong in both power and form. The third person to join the group.
Manga version
Bachō is drawn with notably thicker eyebrows

=== Shokatsuryō ===
Shokatsuryō Kōmei (諸葛亮 孔明; Zhuge Liang - Kongming)
Real name: Shuri (朱里; Zhuli)
Voiced by: Suzune Kusunoki (visual novel), Erika Narumi (anime)

Visual novel version
When she was evacuating a village and met Kazuto, she was impressed to see the very "messenger from heaven" helping the people. She then begs Kazuto to let her join his army, and he allows her to due to his knowledge that she was a master strategist. The third to join the group. She has a tendency to say "Hawawa" very often to the point of the being called the "Hawawa Strategist" by the soldiers. She also has a hobby of reading perverted books to discover new ways to please Kazuto. Though her books are often busted, sometimes even by Kazuto himself.
Anime version
A shy, kind, and reserved girl around the same age as Rinrin, but is a smart, good strategist in battle. However, her naive and child-like nature often overshadows these attributes, and has been known to act on the same level of immaturity as Chōhi. She wants to become a great scholar like her master Shibaki. The fourth to join the group. She was also trained in herbal medicine.

=== Kōchū ===
Kōchū Kanshō (黄忠 漢升; Huang Zhong - Hansheng)
Real name: Shion (紫苑; Ziyuan)
Voiced by: Kū Iida (visual novel), Yū Amamiya (anime)

Visual novel version
Her daughter Riri (see below) was kidnapped by Enshō's men to make Kōchū fight Kazuto's army. Thanks to Chōun, Kazuto's group was able to rescue Riri and returned her to Kōchū. The rescue allows her to see how Kazuto is a good person, and she offers her services to him and fights at his side. She loves Kazuto and even wants him to be the father of her future children, even though she teases him frequently. She usually gives Kazuto advice in love and the likes of the girls, even to Sousou's subordinates when they are captured.
Anime version
A skilled archer with great eyesight and incredible skill in archery. She is a noble woman who loves her daughter Riri. In the anime, her daughter is kidnapped by bandits and they try to force her to assassinate an official that has been cracking down on bandits. Kan'u and her friends must try to rescue the child before the assassination can take place. The fifth and last to join the group.

=== Gengan ===
Gengan (厳顔; Yan Yan)
Real name: Kikyō (桔梗; Jiegeng)
Voiced by: Ayano Shiroi (visual novel), Shizuka Arai (anime)

Visual novel version
A female general in Shin Koihime Musō. Kōchū's close friend and drinking partner. She sports a large red shoulder armor on her left shoulder when geared up for battle. Very tall and quite voluptuous, she teases Kazuto often just like Kōchū does.
Anime version
A single female federal lord that was the teacher to Gien, she decommissioned her from straining the promise that Gien would not draw her sword. Even though she has duties as a federal lord, she does do some leisurely activities ranging from drinking alcohol to attending and betting on horse races. She reappears near the end to help in the final battle against Ukitsu and his Terracotta Warriors.

=== Gien ===
Gien Bunchō (魏延 文長; Wei Yan - Wenchang)
Real name: En'ya (焔耶; Yanye)
Voiced by: Hikaru Kaga (visual novel), Hiromi Hirata (anime)

Visual novel version
A warrior in Shin Koihime Musō. She's easily distinguished by her black hair with white streaks on the right side. A devoted bodyguard of Ryūbi. Has a tomboyish personality and seems to take exception to any kind of behavior that suggests affection or attraction, whether from people, or animals (such as Ryofu's dogs). Initially hostile towards Kazuto and thinks of him as a perverted troublemaker, until she is "punished" by Batai in a very humiliating way (Batai tricked Gien into a well prepared snare trap, and then tickled her). At first denying it.
Anime version
A warrior who was the apprentice of Gengan, she first started out as one of her most trusted pupils, but when she was ambushed by bandits, she killed most of them. Gengan then put a string around her sword, and made a promise not to kill without permission again. Unfortunately, she lost her temper with the second encounter, and killed every last of them, thus decommissioning their bond, though she was given Gengan's weapon. Later joined Ryūbi on the quest to look for medicine due to her romantic feelings for Ryūbi, who (according to Gengan) is almost like the splitting image of her deceased older sister.

=== Batai ===
Batai (馬岱; Ma Dai)
Real name: Tanpopo (蒲公英; Pugongying)
Voiced by: Ringo Aoba (visual novel, anime)

Visual Novel Version
Bachō's cousin in Shin Koihime Musō. Despite being younger than Bachō, she has no issues being around men. In fact she often teases Bachō about the latter's issues with men, sometimes by putting her into embarrassing situations, like bringing her to see Kazuto while he's bathing in a river causing Bachō to freak out. She also likes Kazuto, and is aggressive in pursuing him, going as far as to lead him out to a forest (on the pretense that Bachō was kidnapped), knock him unconscious, and have her way with him.
Anime Version
Batai first appears in the 11th episode of Shin Koihime Musō to train under her cousin Bachō and made friends with Riri at Touka village. Due to Bachō harsh training methods, Batai gets her revenge on her by tricking her to drink a giant gourd of water and not allowing her to use the bathroom by sundown or faced being called a bed wetter.

=== Hōtō ===
Hōtō Shigen (鳳統 士元; Pang Tong - Shiyuan)
Real name: Hinari (雛里; Chuli)
Voiced by: Nobuno Kujō (visual novel), Yūko Gotō (anime)

Visual Novel Version
Appears in Shin Koihime Musō. Shuri's closest friend, who's almost always with her, and even shares her hobby of reading perverted books. Her outfit resembles that of a witch. Her habit of saying "Awawa" has earned her the nickname "Awawa Strategist". Her name is different from the original Hōtō's, as the character "Hō" is written with the kanji for "phoenix" in her name, and not "dragon".
Anime Version
Hōtō is first introduced in episode 10 of Shin Koihime Musō as another of Shibaki's students. When Shuri returns to visit Shibaki, Hōtō becomes jealous of the relationship between the two as she felt Shuri was taking her mother figure away from her. But after a talk to sort out the misunderstanding between her and Shuri, Hōtō revealed she never hated Shuri since she wanted to know more about her. Since then, both of them have become friends.

=== Bakyū ===
Bakyū (馬休; Ma Xiu)
Real name: Ruo (鶸; Ruo)
Voiced by: Ion Momoyama (visual novel)

Visual Novel Version
The middle of the Ba siblings.

=== Batetsu ===
Batetsu (馬鉄; Ma Tie)
Real name: Sō (蒼; Cang)
Voiced by: Yū Himehara (visual novel)

Visual Novel Version
The youngest of the Ba siblings.

=== Bihō ===
Bihō Shihō (糜芳 子方; Mi Fang - Zifang)
Real name: Denden (電々; Diandian)
Voiced by: Sarah Ayumi (visual novel)

Visual Novel Version
Rairai's twin sister.

=== Bijiku ===
Bijiku Shichū (糜竺 子仲; Mi Zhu - Zizhong)
Real name: Rairai (雷々; Leilei)
Voiced by: Yui Kusuhara (visual novel)

Visual Novel Version
Denden's twin sister.

=== Sonken Kōyū ===
Sonken Kōyū (孫乾 公祐; Sun Qian - Gongyou)
Real name: Mīfa (美花; Meihua)
Voiced by: Mei Hanazono (visual novel)

Visual Novel Version
Ryuubi's personal maid and bodyguard.

== Gi (魏, Wèi) ==
=== Sōsō ===
Sōsō Mōtoku (曹操 孟徳; Cao Cao - Mengde)
Real name: Karin (華琳; Hualin)
Voiced by: Yukie Maeda (visual novel, anime) (credited as Kana Nojima in the visual novel)

Visual Novel Version
The ruler of the Gi kingdom. She rarely becomes upset and wishes to obtain beautiful women into her control, particularly Kan'u. In the first game after becoming a captive of the Shoku kingdom, she strongly questions and is annoyed by how Kazuto could still be alive due to his naiveness, unlordly behavior, and strong trust in others. However, she admits it is naiveness that gained him generals like Kan'u. She often questions how she could lose to Kazuto and in turn, Kazuto often questions how he could defeat her. In Koihime, she gives herself up after the war due to her duty, pride and sense of obligation with the understanding that Kazuto swore not to make her people suffer more. She starts to like him for his gentleness towards her and her subordinates when she surrendered instead of publicly beheading, and possibly raping, them. This is especially true as she realizes he does have keen insight and intelligence within his clumsy manner. As such, she includes him in her selective teasing of her subordinates. Such as not letting them know Kazuto not only had no intention of beheading them, but had promised and even given reasons not to do so. In Shin Koihime Musō, she is a brilliant and powerful warlord with the objective of reuniting China under her rule, and makes use of Kazuto's knowledge of Asian history to her advantage if he becomes her advisor. She later falls in love with Kazuto, but is too proud to admit it.
Anime version
The Blonde Queen of the kingdom of Gi and a General of the Kan empire. Sōsō likes beautiful women and likes to tease her subordinates, especially her strategist Jun'iku, but is also attracted to Kan'u. In fact, a famous scene in the first season's closing credits shows her "kidnapping" a dining Kan'u and then kissing her while inside a private bedchamber. Kan'u was later returned to the dining table with the rest of her friends, albeit covered in kiss marks and quite shaken. A brilliant ruler and military genius, she also isn't afraid to speak her mind in any situation if she doesn't like it. Despite being seen as a little cruel and calculating, she is in reality an honorable person. Sōsō also doesn't like being denied what she wants, and vows to get Kan'u in her bedchamber.
In Shin Koihime Musō, she is also revealed to be an excellent chef.

=== Kakōton ===
Kakōton Genjō (夏侯惇 元譲; Xiahou Dun - Yuanrang)
Real name: Shunran (春蘭; Chunlan)
Voiced by: Harumi Asai (visual novel, anime) (credited as Haruka Fukai in the visual novel)

Visual Novel Version
She is the elder sister of the Kakō sisters and is also Sōsō's cousin and a commander of the Gi kingdom. She is strong on the battlefield, but is extremely straight forward in her thinking, shown by her lack of understanding the meanings of proverbs. Like many of Sōsō's subordinates, she enjoys being complimented or acknowledged by her ruler. In the first game after becoming a captive of Shoku, she is greatly annoyed by Kazuto, especially when Sousou doesn't deny showing interest in him. Like most of his captives, she becomes less hostile later on and starts to show feelings for him in a more obvious manner. However, she was already showing signs of liking him in ways that only someone who knew her well could see. Such as telling Kazuto over and over she was going to kill him, after hearing him use Sousou's true name and that he had slept with her again, yet did no more than make a small cut on his neck. Under normal circumstances she'd have killed him on the spot rather than commenting over and over about it. Kakōen even comments at a later point that Kakōton really likes him despite the negative comments earlier in the day as her personality is the more direct action type and has just cut down others on the spot for less. She is the first member of Gi's head leadership to call him My Lord (although secondary to her allegiance to Sousou.) This prompts Sousou and Kakōen to do so as well soon after. Then to tease Kazuto they all called him My Lord in front of Kan'u who knew there was a lot more not being said.

In Shin Koihime Musō, she tends to exhibit a somewhat childish behavior (like when she cried after dropping and damaging a precious object when a horseman passed too close to her), and she has an awkward view of Kazuto, with a tendency to blush while conversing with him, as if trying to hide any romantic feelings she may have towards him behind her strong steadfast front.

Anime version
Sōsō's cousin and one of her commanders. The elder twin of the Kakō Sisters, she is a strong, prideful, hot-headed person yet is understanding and loyal to her cousin whom she loves and understands her feelings.

=== Kakōen ===
Kakōen Myōsai (夏侯淵 妙才; Xiahou Yuan - Miaocai)
Real name: Shūran (秋蘭; Qiulan)
Voiced by: Aoi Kisaragi (visual novel), Airi Yoshida (anime)

Visual Novel Version
The younger sister of the Kakō sisters and also Sōsō's cousin and a commander of the Gi kingdom. Unlike her sister, she is calm and very intelligent. In the first game she shows no signs of resent for Kazuto after being captured and even go as far as placing him as her 5th favorite later on. (First three are Sousou [Karin], Kakōton [Shunran], and Kyocho [Kii]. Kakōton hints that the fourth is Ganryō [General Toshi of En] which Kakōen neither confirms nor denies.) Outside Sousou, she's the only one to be capable of calming her sister. In Shin Koihime Musō, she has a normal friendly relationship towards Kazuto, and often asks him to bear with her older sister's odd behavior.
Anime version
The younger twin sister of Ton. Just like her sister, she is also loyal to her cousin Sōsō and is one of her commanders. Unlike her sister, she is more calm and an ingenuous person. But like her sister, she is also understanding and loyal to Sōsō.

=== Chōryō ===
Chōryō Bun'en (張遼 文遠; Zhang Liao - Wenyuan)
Real name: Shia (霞; Xia)
Voiced by: Kaoru Morota (visual novel, anime) (credited as AYA in the visual novel)

Visual Novel Version
She is allied with the Tō empire, then goes to the Gi empire after being defeated by Kakōton, then to the Shoku empire after being defeated by Kan'u. She has a hatred of unfair battles and enjoys fair fights with strong opponents. She has an obsession with Kan'u to the point of modeling her own weapon as a black version of the Green Dragon Crescent Blade. After being captured by Kazuto's forces, she develops a 3 way relationship with Kazuto and Kan'u. In Shin Koihime Musō, she joins forces with the Gi empire after being defeated by them and remains loyal to them.
Anime version
A beautiful, proud warrior who looks like a Yakuza gangster and speaks with a Kansai dialect. She likes a good and honest fight and detests cheating. She is an avid lover of wine.

=== Jun'iku ===
Jun'iku Bunjaku (荀彧 文若; Xun Yu - Wenruo)
Real name: Keifa (桂花; Guihua)
Voiced by: Miru (visual novel), Oma Ichimura (anime)

Visual Novel Version
The strategist of the Gi kingdom. Out of all of Sōsō's subordinates, she is most likely the one who enjoys being teased by her the most. She starts to develop a small rivalry with Kazuto for Sōsō's attention after being captured (in the first game) or when Kazuto serves as Sōsō's advisor (in Shin Koihime Musō).
Anime version
Sōsō's trusted adviser and strategist who wears a cat-eared hood. She has a huge crush on Sōsō and does not mind being teased by her. She has a rivalry with the Kakō sisters due to the fact they are Sōsō's cousins and are closer to her.

=== Kyocho ===
Kyocho Chūkō (許緒 仲康; Xu Chu - Zhongkang)
Real name: Kii (季衣; Jiyi)
Voiced by: Mariya Sumida (visual novel, anime)

Visual Novel Version
A young girl with pink hair who is a commander of the Gi kingdom. She is the only subordinate that Sōsō does not tease. In the first game when captured by the Shoku empire, she almost instantly gets along with Kazuto and calls him 'Nii-chan', much to Rinrin's chagrin. She has a similar attitude towards him in Shin Koihime Musō when he becomes Sōsō's advisor. Kakōton and Kakōen care for Kyocho like a little sister.
Anime version
A small, young girl with great strength and a large appetite, often winning in eating contests. She wields a Flail, with a handle resembling a kendama chained to a huge iron ball with spikes. She hates being called "Chibi" as she will go into furious rage if anyone calls her that.

=== Kakuka ===
Kakuka Hōkō (郭嘉 奉孝; Guo Jia - Fengxiao)
Real name: Rin (稟; Lin)
Voiced by: Asami Imai (as Namiko Yamazaki in visual novel)

Visual Novel Version
A bespectacled female strategist in Shin Koihime Musō. She easily gets nosebleeds when having explicit fantasies, and as a result is sometimes found passed out on the ground and often mistaken to be dead (due to a pool of blood from her nosebleeding).
Anime Version
A woman seeking to become a strategist of Sōsō's forces, and is also romantically attracted to the warlord. She ends up becoming Sōsō's bodyguard instead, much to her chagrin. Later, her talent as strategist is accepted by Sōsō who realizes she's much better suited to be her strategist. Teiiku calls her Itchan (いっちゃん).

=== Tei'iku ===
Tei'iku Chūtoku (程昱 仲徳; Cheng Yu - Zhongde)
Real name: Fū (風; Feng)
Voiced by: Erena Kaibara (visual novel), Hyo-sei (anime)

Visual Novel Version
The silent adviser girl and a new character in Shin Koihime Musō. She is known for always carrying a lollipop, as well as wearing a head ornament that somehow reflects her emotions. She is also one of first people Kazuto meets should he enter the Gi Route. He mistakenly calls her by her Mana; or true name; when he hears Chōun and Kakuka call her by that which results in Chōun almost harming him until he apologizes. Her best friends are Chōun and Kakuka.
Anime Version
Kakuka's companion who tries her best to keep Kakuka out of trouble, often cleaning up the messes she makes from her nosebleed episodes. She's a good ventriloquist, usually utilizing it on her head ornament she named Hōkei. She is also seeking to serve under Sōsō as a strategiest, and is accepted as such.

=== Gakushin ===
Gakushin Bunken (楽進 文謙; Yue Jin - Wenqian)
Real name: Nagi (凪; Chi)
Voiced by: Nazuna Gogyō (visual novel), Ryōko Ono (anime)

Visual Novel Version
A female warrior general and a new character in Shin Koihime Musō. A strict general who believes in order and discipline, and as such has a tough time keeping her comrades Riten and Ukin under control, using brute force if necessary.

=== Riten ===
Riten Mansei (李典 曼成; Li Dian - Mancheng)
Real name: Maō (真桜; Zhenying)
Voiced by: Iroha Haruno (visual novel), Rie Nakagawa (anime)

Visual Novel Version
A female mechanic in Shin Koihime Musō. She and her comerade Ukin like to goof around during peacetime, much to the chagrin of Gakushin. She is also quite voluptuous given her short stature.

=== Ukin ===
Ukin Bunsoku (于禁 文則; Yu Jin - Wenze)
Real name: Sawa (沙和; Shahe)
Voiced by: An Kasuga (visual novel), Momo Kasumi (anime)

Visual Novel Version
A new bespectacled character in Shin Koihime Musō. She and her comrade Riten like to goof around during peacetime, much to the chagrin of Gakushin.

=== Ten'i ===
Ten'i Shiman (典韋; Dian Wei)
Real name: Ruru (流琉; Liuliu)
Voiced by: Nonomi Tenkawa (visual novel), Tomomi Tenjinbayashi (anime)

Visual Novel Version
A character who wields a yoyo as a weapon in Shin Koihime Musō. Kyocho's friend and frequent sparring partner. The two of them tend to cause a lot of property damage during their sparring sessions. Like Kyocho, she sees Kazuto as a big brother, calling him 'Nii-sama'.
Anime Version
A girl encountered by Kan'u's group working as a chef at a tavern in the Gi kingdom in Shin Koihime Musō. Sōsō learned about her when Rinrin blurted out liking Ten'i's food better, so Sōsō gave her a test to compare her cooking skills against her own. Sōsō was not so impressed at first, until Kan'u's group noticed Ten'i prepared the dishes with food they liked at her tavern, and Sōsō conceded defeat. Then when a raging bull crashed the scene, Ten'i surprised everyone with her immense strength when she literally grabbed the bull by the horns and hurled it out of Sōsō's palace, earning her an invitation to join Sōsō's army.

=== Kyokō ===
Kyokō (許貢; Xu Gong)

Only her name appears, in Go route and is a detachment of Go previously before leaving to join Gi.
All of her followers were executed by a furious Karin for contaminating the battle against Go by trying to assassinate Sonsaku(died after the battle due to poison set in the arrow).

=== Sōjin ===
Sōjin Shikō (曹仁 子孝; Cao Ren - Zixiao)
Real name: Karon (華侖; Hualun)
Voiced by: Kanau (visual novel)

Visual Novel Version
Karin's cousin and Ruurin's older sister. An honest girl with a carefree attitude but not very bright, sometimes even rivalizing with Shunran in "Airhead" category. Admires Karin and wants to be helpful to her. Likes to undress to get more confortable for any reason.

=== Sōjun ===
Sōjun Shiwa (曹純 子和; Cao Chun - Zihe)
Real name: Rūrin (柳琳; Liulin)
Voiced by: Sawa Sawasawa (visual novel)

Visual Novel Version
Karin's cousin and Karon's younger sister. A really gentle and caring woman. Her appearance and manner hides her true strength. She in charge of various duties and so accumulates stress easily.

=== Sōkō ===
Sōkō Shiren (曹洪 子廉; Cao Hong - Zilian)
Real name: Eika (栄華; Ronghua)
Voiced by: Kaname Shirotsuki (visual novel)

Visual Novel Version
Karin's cousin. Is in charge of Gi's economy and is very noisy about money saving. Likes cute girls just like Karin but her targets are... younger...

=== Jokō ===
Jokō Kōmei (徐晃 公明; Xu Huang - Gongming)
Real name: Shanfū (香風; Xiangfeng)
Voiced by: Usa Fujisaki (visual novel)

Visual Novel Version
She used to live in a city where the regent was corrupt and did not care about the people. That place was dangerous so she had to learn to defend herself. One day she saw birds flying freely and became envious, she also wanted to fly. Shortly after leaving the city with Sei, Rin and Fuu, Kazuto falls from the sky right on Shanfu. She quickly gets attached to him as she believes he knows how to fly.

=== Chinkei ===
Chinkei Kan'yu (陳珪 漢瑜; Chen Gui - Hanyu)
Real name: Tō (燈; Deng)
Voiced by: Suzune Kusunoki (visual novel)

Visual Novel Version
Sū's mother. She is a new strategist in Gi.

=== Chintō ===
Chintō Genryu (陳登 元龍; Chen Deng - Yuanlong)
Real name: Sū (喜雨; Xiyu)
Voiced by: Mitsu Anzu (visual novel)

Visual Novel Version
Tō's daughter. Like her mother, she is a strategist at Gi.

== Go (呉, Wú) ==
=== Sonsaku ===
Sonsaku Hakufu (孫策 伯符; Sun Ce - Bofu)
Real name: Sheren (雪連; Xuelian)
Voiced by: Yuki Satou (visual novel), Yoneshima Nozomi (anime)

Visual novel version
The queen of Go Kingdom, the eldest sister of the Son family, and leader of the Go faction in Shin Koihime Musō. She's nicknamed "Little Conqueror", due to her ambitious dream of unifying the land. If Kazuto joins the Go Kingdom, her tenure as leader ends when she is assassinated prior to a battle against forces of the Gi kingdom, subsequently passing the mantle to her sister Sonken, and causing the Go faction to misunderstand that Sōsō is the one responsible for her assassination.
However, in Shoku route, she survives and as such appears in the Moeshouden fandisc, which assumes Shoku route ending. She relinquishes the position of the queen of Go in favor of her sister Sonken, and becomes mostly a comic relief character - a carefree person who occasionally maintains order in the streets and takes wine as reward. She often comes up with silly plans and behaves idiotically in a state of drunkenness, much to the embarrassment of her peers in Go.
She doesn't appear in the first game outside of a flashback, but her dream affected Shuyu deeply.
Anime version
The queen of Go Kingdom and the eldest sister of the Son family. Originally set to appear in Shin Koihime Musō, she made her first appearance in the anime. While loving and caring to her sisters and subordinates, she is ruthless in battle and to her enemies. To fulfill the last wishes of her late mother, Sonken, she has led her kingdom into a long war to unite the country. While her methods have been scrutinized, she admittedly accepts responsibility for her actions since she would rather have her hands bloody rather than have her family suffer the same fate as she has. She hopes to abdicate in favor of her sister Sonken and retire with her lover Shūyu after fulling her mother's wishes.
In the OVA, Sonsaku was depicted as a drop-out of the academy she used to attend with her sisters and always lounges about in their dorm room, playing video and computer games. Shuuyu kept having sentimental thoughts about Sonsaku as if she already died, much to the latter's annoyance, often breaking the 4th wall and gripe to Shuuyu that she is not really dead.

=== Sonken ===
Sonken Chūbō (孫権 仲謀; Sun Quan - Zhongmou)
Real name: Renfa (蓮華; Lianhua)
Voiced by: Harumi Sakurai (visual novel, anime) (credited as Kazane in the visual novel)

Visual novel version
She is the leader of the Go faction. Unlike her sister, she prefers peace for the people. She is insecure about being a ruler and questions herself often whether she's fit to carry the lineage's pride. She also possesses decent fighting skills, but has only used them in training, not actual battle. This lack of real battle experience caused her to fail to land even a single hit on Kan'u before being defeated. After her defeat, she gives herself up as a punishment for her incompetence in being a ruler. However, she begins to develop feelings for Kazuto as he accepts her as simply a girl rather than a ruler, and for always treating her and her subordinates more as friends than prisoners during their time as "hostages". It is also slightly hinted by Ukitsu and even Renfa herself that she already developed a crush for Kazuto earlier, possibly in their alliance against Gi. Of Kazuto's harem, she is arguably the closest to a normal girlfriend in the way she acts.
In Shin Koihime Musō, her older sister Sonsaku takes her place as the leader of Go faction. Her hair has also been greatly lengthened. However if Kazuto joins the Go faction, Sonsaku is eventually killed in action early in the campaign, and Sonken takes over with a heavy heart, cutting her hair upon doing so. She refused to accept Kazuto at first, but later falls in love with him.
Anime version
Princess of Go, second sister of the Son family, and Sonsaku's younger sister. Unlike her older sister, she is less ruthless, uneasy about herself, and more kind-hearted. She worries about how her sister's wars are affecting everyone which, unknown to her, her sister is doing is for their sake. Her sister has chosen her to be her successor; she knows that she will be a better ruler who will heal the wounds the nation has suffered from the wars.

=== Sonshōkō ===
Sonshōkō (孫尚香; Sun Shangxiang)
Real name: Shaoren (小蓮; Xiaolian)
Voiced by: Minami Hokuto (visual novel, anime) (credited as hitomi in the anime)

Visual Novel Version
She charges out of the kingdom to fight against the Hongō faction who are falsely accused for betraying the alliance with Go faction. After being captured by Hongō faction and clearing up the misunderstanding, she takes a liking to Kazuto due to his kindness and enjoys playing around with him. Along with her sister Sonken, they are the only 2 girls who calls Kazuto by his first name without honorifics(all others either calls him by his title or last name).
Anime version
The youngest sister of the Son family and a princess of Go. She joins Aisha's group after she runs way from home, bored of doing her royal duties, and later returns home. She tends to be a bit egotistical, which is the cause of her rivalry with Rinrin.

=== Shūyu ===
Shūyu Kōkin (周瑜 公謹; Zhou Yu - Gongjin)
Real name: Meirin (冥琳; Minglin)
Voiced by: Rino Kawashima (visual novel), Kei Mizusawa (anime)

Visual Novel Version
The brilliant strategist for the Go faction, said to rivals Koumei. Her affection for Sonsaku goes so far that she is willing to sacrifice everything else for Sonsaku's dream, even if it means to betray Sonken's trust in the original game. After being dealt a crushing defeat by the Shoku army, she eventually commits suicide by setting the palace room on fire and staying in there, not before stating that she had no regrets and knowing that she will be reunited with her lover Sonsaku in the afterlife. In Shin Koihime Musō, if Kazuto joins Go faction, Shūyu eventually dies in action at the end of the campaign after the Gi faction is defeated.
Anime version
Go Kingdom's master strategist. She is a close confidant and lover to Queen Sonsaku who understands her Queen's ambition. She has sworn loyalty to her until their task is done.

=== Kannei ===
Kannei Kōha (甘寧 興覇; Gan Ning - Xingba)
Real name: Shishun (思春; Sichun)
Voiced by: Ryōko Tanaka (visual novel, anime) (credited as Hikaru Isshiki in the visual novel)

Visual Novel Version
A loyal vassal and overprotective bodyguard of Sonken who almost never leaves her side. However, unlike Kakōton who is Sousou's bodyguard, she feels thankful for Kazuto as he has made Sonken more happy and lighthearted compared to when Sonken was still a ruler, which she wasn't capable of. In Koihime, she's one of the very few that actually think highly of his kindness rather than to criticize it as a weakness. Unlike other girls, she wears a female version of fundoshi.
Anime version
A loyal bodyguard and warrior to the Son family. While normally calm, she becomes hotheaded when someone questions her loyalty to the Son's. In the third season, she served at Ryomo's commanding officer, assigning her to be Sonken's bodyguard. She was furious when Ryomo almost failed to protect Sonken when a thief snuck into the palace storeroom and Sonken was the one who subdued the thief. Even though Ryomo redeemed herself by preventing an assassination attempt against Sonsaku, Kannei discharged her from her troop by telling her to relinquish her fundoshi, the symbol of her troop. However, it was revealed that Kannei requested Shuuyu to take Ryomo in as an apprentice strategist to Sonken, feeling that Ryomo is more suited as a strategist rather than a bodyguard. Unlike in reality, she was not a pirate.

=== Rikuson ===
Rikuson Hakugen (陸遜 伯言; Lu Xun - Boyan)
Real name: Non (穏; Wen)
Voiced by: Natsumi Yanase (visual novel, anime) (credited as Izumi Maki in the visual novel)

Visual Novel Version
Shūyu's disciple and co-strategist. She, however, devotes herself more to Sonken than Shūyu, even willing to be captured together.
Anime version
Shūyu beloved disciple. A smart yet air-headed official who loves to read books as in her own words; gaining knowledge gives her such pleasure. She befriended Shuri due to their mutual interest in learning and books.

=== Daikyō ===
Daikyō (大喬; Da Qiao)
Voiced by: Michiru Yuimoto (anime)

Visual Novel Version
She, together with her sister, is one of Shūyu's personal "pets" who have the sole purpose of entertaining her. She's a hermaphrodite.
Anime version
One half of the famous twins.

=== Shōkyō ===
Shōkyō (小喬; Xiao Qiao)
Voiced by: Michiru Yuimoto (anime)

Visual Novel Version
She, together with her sister, is one of Shūyu's personal "pets" who have the sole purpose of entertaining her. Unlike her sister Daikyō, she is fully female.
Anime version
One half of the famous twins.

=== Shūtai ===
Shūtai Yōhei (周泰 幼平; Zhou Tai - Youping)
Real name: Minmei (明命; Mingming)
Voiced by: Ichigo Momoi (visual novel), Aiko Ōkubo (anime)

Visual Novel Version
An officer in Shin Koihime Musō. Despite her small size she's a skillful warrior, wielding a sword that's as long as she is tall. She's quite fond of cats. She develops a huge crush on Kazuto, to the point of blushing profusely when the other members of the Go faction tease her about it.

=== Kōgai ===
Kōgai Kōfuku (黄蓋 公覆; Huang Gai - Gongfu)
Real name: Sai (祭; Ji)
Voiced by: Miyabi Shion (visual novel), MARIO (anime)

Visual Novel Version
A general in Shin Koihime Musō. A cunning warrior who infiltrates Sōsō's forces on a pretense of defection during a major naval battle (based on the Battle of Chi Bi) and sets the Gi faction's ships on fire. If Kazuto joins the Gi Faction, Kōgai is eventually killed for these actions.
Anime
Although she didn't appear much in the first two installments of the anime (she is however seen in the credits of the final episode of Shin Koihime Muso), Kōgai made her official appearance in Shin Koihime Musou Otome Tairan. She is described as Songo's longest and most trusted adviser. She played an essential part in getting Sonsaku and Shuuya to stop fighting after the former drank the special drink that the latter purchased in secret for their special occasion. One of her pet peeves is being described or being exemplified as old, once retorting that she is not that old since there are men who turn heads when they see her.

=== Ryomō ===
Ryomō Shimei (呂蒙 子明; Lü Meng - Ziming)
Real name: Ashe (亞莎; Yasha)
Voiced by: Kaori Mizuhashi (anime)

Visual Novel Version
A bespectacled officer and a new character in Shin Koihime Musō. She was recommended by Shoken for her talent and help with the rebellion against Enjutsu. Sonsaku plans to train her to be Sonken's right-hand man. Her eyesight is pretty lackluster, to the point that she tends to see double of everything. The cause seems to be because she studies at night frequently. In one of the late studies, Kazuto brings her a snack called Goma Dango. She liked it so much that she became a frequent purchaser and in Moeshouden she went up to the stage and recommend that everyone try it as well. She is mentioned by name only in Koihime where Kan'u shows slight irritation for just seeing her on the battlefield. (An obvious nod to Lu Meng's Invasion of Jing Providence which led to Guan Yu's historical death.)
Anime version
Unlike her scholarly counterpart in the game, Ryomō starts as a warrior and serves in the personal guard under Kannei unlike real history, which was in the exactly vice versa. She is eventually relieved of her duties to be appointed as an apprentice strategist to Sonken, whom she appears to have developed a crush on during their time spent together (it was implied that Sonken also feels this way). She is also near-sighted in one eye, unable to see closely without her monocle, which Sonken bought to help with this vision problem

=== Sonken Bundai ===
Sonken Bundai (孫堅 文台; Sun Jian - Wentai)
Real name: Yenren (炎蓮; Yanlian)
Voiced by: Yuki-Lin (visual novel)

Visual Novel Version
Sheren, Renfa and Shaoren's thought deceased mother.
After her assumed death, her conquered territories broke apart, forcing the remaining Sonken family to serve under Miu's rule.
She appears in the append where one more Kazuto appears just after Seki Heki's battle. While the second Kazuto is traveling with Kada, Chousen and Himiko they encounter her camping besides Sai's body, Kada says that her life lifgt is dim but certainly there still some left and revives Sai. After Kazuto's party leaving, Sai wakes up and after confirming that Yenren is alive, asks her to help Renfa and the others. Yenren refuses saying that if they lose to Karin that was the limit for Sonken's Line, after that Sai asks to accompany Yenren which she permits saying that if Sai becomes a burden she will abandon her. At the append's story ending, Yenren says that "The continent isn't for Sousou alone.
Yenren first appears watching the sky and catches sight of a falling star near her city. She sends her daughter Sheren to scout it, who brings back Hongou Kazuto with her. When Kazuto is introduced to her, Yenren demands Kazuto proves who he says he is, a person from the future, which he does by using his smart phone and informing her of the 'Yellow turban' rebellion. Yenren than accepts Kazuto's story and decides to re adjust his story to make him out to be a 'messenger of heaven' to improve the moral and position of the Go family. While she intends to use Kazuto's knowledge about future battles, she instructs him to never tell her of the death of significant figures in them. She then commands that Kazuto spread his 'spiritual seed' to the woman of the Go army to strengthen the impression that the Go had the heavens on their side and in exchange she will place him under her protection and feed him, to which he accepts. Yenren proceeds to lead the Go army to several victories, and even proceeds to have a sexual relationship with Kazuto in order to have more children. She continues to train Sheren in ruling and combat but admits that she's concerned as to if Sheren has the right mentality for Ruling. On a battlefield, Yenren saves Suirei from a fatal arrow but is hit by the same arrow in the process. She continues to fight despite her injury, using the last of her strength to injure the archer who fired the shot. As she lies on the ground, she comforts a crying Sheren and asks Kazuto to look after her daughters. She then "dies" passing the title of Queen and her sword to Sheren.
Anime version
The late mother of the Son sisters and the previous queen of Go. Known as the Tiger of Kōtō, she told her last wishes to her daughter and heir, Sonsaku, to unite the nation for the Son family.

=== Sonsei ===
Sonsei Yōdai (孫静 幼台; Sun Jing - Youtai)
Voiced by: Yuriko Yamaguchi (anime)

Anime version
The Son sister's aunt and Sonken's younger sister. While strict with her youngest niece, she is loyal to her queen and niece, Sonsaku. However, it is later revealed that she strongly disagrees with the wars led by Sonsaku, which she believes will destroy Go and the Son family. She and a group of nobles collaborated to have Sonsaku assassinated and take over the throne, but the plan fails thanks to a manipulating scheme by the queen and her allies where she and the collaborators were arrested.
In the OVA, she later appears as one of the homeroom teachers (particularly of Kosonsan as seen in the first OVA's intro) of St. Francesca Academy, where all the characters attend.

=== Chōshō ===
Chōshō Shifu (張昭 子布; Zhang Zhao - Zibu)
Real name: Raika (雷火; Leihuo)
Voiced by: Ginshu Minami (visual novel)

Visual Novel Version
Advisor and tactician for the Son family for years. Despite her small body she is about the same age as Sai and hates being taken lightly because of her appearance.
Anime version
An elder noble of Go. At first, it seems he was one of the ringleaders of the collaborators who planned to assassinate Sonsaku and give the throne to Sonsei. Later it was revealed he was actually Queen Sonsaku's ally and was using his position in the group to gain evidence for their part in the plot.

=== Roshuku ===
Roshuku Shikei (魯粛 子敬; Lu Su - Zijing)
Real name: Pao (包; Bao)
Voiced by: Ui (visual novel)

Visual Novel Version
She is one of the strategists in Go.

=== Taishiji ===
Taishiji Shigi (太史慈 子義; Taishi Ci - Ciyi)
Real name: Rian (梨晏; Liyan)
Voiced by: Yui Sakakibara (visual novel)

Visual Novel Version
One of Go's generals; friends with Sonsaku and Shuuyu.

=== Teifu ===
Teifu Tokubō (程普 徳謀; Cheng Pu - Demou)
Real name: Suirei (粋怜; Cuilian)
Voiced by: Yūka Kotorii (visual novel)

Visual Novel Version
One of Go's generals; an old friend of Kougai's.

== Tō (董, Dong)/Kan (漢, Han) ==
=== Tōtaku ===
Tōtaku Chūei (董卓 仲穎; Dong Zhuo - Zhongying)
Real name: Yue (月; Yue)
Voiced by: Ayaka Kimura (visual novel), Yuka Inokuchi (anime)

Visual Novel Version
The ruler of the Tō empire. Kazuto is instantly surprised by her appearance compared to the Tōtaku he read about back in his own world. Due to being victims of the mysterious white soldiers, Kazuto takes her and Kaku into his care as maids. Because of his act of kindness, she harbors a strong liking for Kazuto and enjoys being his maid. In Shin Koihime Musō, she joins forces with the Shoku kingdom, becoming one of the strategists.
Anime version
The governess of Tō province. However unlike her real life counterpart, who was a tyrannical and cruel man, she is a kind, sweet, timid and innocent girl who wants to help her country and her people no matter the circumstance. Due to her innocent personality, most are unable to say no to her as they are too helpless against her innocent pleas.

=== Kaku ===
Kaku Bunwa (賈駆 文和; Jia Xu - Wenhe)
Real name: Ei (詠; Yong)
Voiced by: Yukari Aoyama (visual novel), Akane Tomonaga (anime)

Visual Novel Version
The To strategist and Yue's best friend from childhood. She becomes irritated when Yue opens up to Kazuto, but cannot say no to her. She has some interest in Kazuto, but is always too angry and proud to show it. It is later shown that her harshness is mostly a result from her forgetting own happiness to devote herself to protect Yue.
Anime version
Tōtaku's strategist and adviser. While short-tempered and a serious minded girl, she does not have the heart to say no to her childhood friend Yue.

=== Kayū ===
Kayū (華雄; Hua Xiong)
Voiced by: Miya Serizono (visual novel, anime) (credited as Hiroka Nishizawa in the anime)

Visual Novel Version
She is very proud of herself, requesting to lead the fight against the three kingdoms, saying sending Ryoufu would be an overkill. She is killed fairly early in the game by Kan'u in a duel. In Shin Koihime Musō, she engages against whichever faction Kazuto is a part early in the campaign, but is defeated. She survives at the end of the Gi Campaign, whereas she is killed in action in either the Shoku campaign. Though she appears to have been killed in the Go Campaign, she reappears in Enjutsu's event scenes.
She's notable for being the only girl that doesn't have a romantic event in any of the games.
Anime version
A brave general of the Tō army. This silver-haired beauty has absolute confidence in her fighting skills. She is also easy going as she doesn't mind if her leader Tōtaku goes visiting commoners in disguise, as she believes it will help their country's welfare if she sees their problems through her own eyes.

=== Ryofu ===
Ryofu Hōsen (呂布 奉先; Lü Bu - Fengxian)
Real name: Ren (恋; Lian)
Voiced by: Honoka Imuraya (visual novel), Emiko Hagiwara (anime)

Visual Novel Version
Called a monster by others due to her ridiculous strength. In truth, she simply wishes to live peacefully with her pets, of which she has about fifty of. She loves Kazuto, but initially does not understand the feeling she experiences. When she eats, people who look at her cannot help but stare in awe due to overwhelming cuteness. In Shin Koihime Musō, she joins forces with the Shoku Kingdom.
Anime version
A silent girl who is the greatest and the most powerful warrior of all in the kingdoms. She was thought as a monster in the mountains, but it all ended in a misunderstanding as she was trying to help her pet dogs. She usually does not show any emotion at all but is really a good-hearted person; she also appears to have a certain degree of charm and charisma about her in that whenever she asks for food from others and then eats at their presence, they immediately become enamored by her(often leading to her being given more food by the bystanders). She appears in episode 5 of the first season where, after clearing up the misunderstanding, became part of Tōtaku's faction.

=== Chinkyū ===
Chinkyū Kōdai (陳宮 公台; Chen Gong - Gongtai)
Real name: Nenene (音々音; Yinyinyin)
Voiced by: Kokoko Tsubakimaru (visual novel), Michiru Yuimoto (anime)

A new character and strategist in Shin Koihime Musō. A self proclaimed partner and advisor of Ryofu, and considers herself Ryofu's protector, dishing out punishment to anyone doing anything she considers offensive to Ryofu (like she did to Kazuto when he bought Ryofu a bagful of nikuman in public, resulting in one of Ryofu's attention-getting eating escapades). She sports an officer's cap with a panda symbol on it.

=== Reitei ===
Reitei (霊帝; Emperor Ling)
Real name: Kūtan (空丹; Kongdan)
Voiced by: Sora Haruka (visual novel)

A new character in Kakumei. She is the leader of Kan emperior.

=== Kentei ===
Kentei (献帝; Emperor Xian)
Real name: Paitan (白湯; Baitang)
Voiced by: Shizuku Amatsu (visual novel)

A new character in Kakumei. She is Reitei younger sister.

=== Chōchū ===
Chōchū (趙忠; Zhao Zhong)
Real name: Fan (黄; Huang)
Voiced by: Mia Naruse (visual novel)

A new character in Kakumei.

=== Kōhosū ===
Kōhosū Gishin (皇甫嵩 義真; Huangfu Song - Yizhen)
Real name: Rouan (楼杏; Louxing)
Voiced by: Mikoto Natsuno (visual novel)

A new character in Kakumei.

=== Roshoku ===
Roshoku Shikan (盧植 子幹; Lu Zhi - Zigan)
Real name: Fūrin (風鈴; Fengling)
Voiced by: Hana Akino (visual novel)

A new character in Kakumei.

=== Kashin ===
Kashin Suikō (何進 遂高; He Jin - Suigao)
Real name: Kei (傾; Qing)
Voiced by: Misaki Kamishiro (visual novel), Ai Orikasa (anime)

Visual Novel Version
Reichen's older sister. She and her little sister used to run a butchery when the late emperor fell in love at first sight for Reichen. After the marriage Kei got the position of Great General(大将軍）despite not having much talent or training in military or in martial arts. Kei and Reichen are despised inside the castle because everyone knows they have no talent, make terrible military/governmental decision and only got their positions due Reichen marrying the late emperor.
Kei many times say she would do anything Reichen asks. According to Reichen, Kei's personality is "Strong against those weaker than her and very weak to those stronger than her" so Reichen controls her easily. She's very proud of her looks and her position as Great General and hates when anyone mention that "She's just a meat seller", reacting aggressively and making even more enemies for her. She also uses seduction to get men to do her bidding like Reichen, but she knows she's not as seductive as Reichen.
Anime version
A silver-haired beauty who was the Commander-in-Chief of the Kan Imperial forces who was also known as the "Great General". She appeared in Shunran's memory as the host of the banquet at which she instigated the incident between Karin and Sui's father Batō, whose accidental death caused Sui to mistake Karin as his killer. She appears again in episode 12 in a war meeting with several commanders, discussing about putting down recent uprisings in the country.
She returns in the third season where she is cursed to be turned into a cat and is accompanied by Kada to find a way to lift the curse at Tōka Village.

=== Kataigō ===
Kataigō (何太后; Empress He)
Real name: Reichen (瑞姫; Ruiji)
Voiced by: Ren Toyotaka (visual novel)

Visual Novel Version
Kei's younger sister. Knowing Kei's personality, she can convince/order her to do basically anything she wants. Reichen and her sister used to run a butchery when the late emperor saw and fell in love at first sight for Reichen, and she wasted no time to take the opportunity.
She likes to use her looks to seduce men to work for her but rarely even lets them touch her. She doesn't really care much about money or social status, but she hates the countryside and wants to live in capital/big cities even if she has to work in a butchery again to do so.

== En (袁, Yuan) ==
=== Enshō ===
Enshō Honsho (袁紹 本初; Yuan Shao - Benchu)
Real name: Reiha (麗羽; Liyu)
Voiced by: Kanami Kono (visual novel), Masami Katou (anime)

Visual Novel Version
A proud person who isn't very bright. She is always using money regardless on how much she has on hand. She has a strong hatred for Sōsō for a majority of reasons that she herself has. In truth, she is very dependent on Bunshū and Ganryō and feels alone and scared without them by her side. During the base phase events, the player assumes an omniscient perspective instead of from the perspective of Kazuto due to Enshō never have been captured by the Shoku, and is instead wandering around China to find treasures with her subordinates. It was revealed in the battle against En Shou that she and Sōsō were actually childhood friends. In Shin Koihime Musō, she and her advisors Bunshū and Ganryō lend their services to the Shoku Kingdom, though during peacetime she engages in activities that embarrass her advisors and sometimes the Shoku officials as well.
Anime version
Head of the Noble En family and the lord of Kei Province, she is a proud, spoiled and selfish woman who is always causing trouble for her advisers, Bunshū and Ganryō. She tries hides her true character from Sōsō, whom she sees as a no-good brat.

=== Bunshū ===
Bunshū (文醜; Wen Chou)
Real name: Iishe (猪々子; Zhuzhuzi)
Voiced by: Sumire Murasakibana (visual novel), Chiro Kanzaki (anime)

Visual Novel Version
A loud girl who tends to act first and think later. She continuously bickers with Enshō during their journey through China. She has a strong relationship with her allies, especially Ganryō, and becomes worried and anxious when something happens to them. She likes to fight strong people despite being incapable of defeating any. In Shin Koihime Musō, she lends her services to the Shoku Kingdom.
Anime version
One of Enshō's advisers. She is a natural gambler who likes to take risks on everything but keeps getting herself and others into trouble. Despite her position as an adviser, she is not really smart, is brash, and tends to say things without thinking about it firsthand, which tend to embarrass her master.

=== Ganryō ===
Ganryō (顔良; Yan Liang)
Real name: Toshi (斗詩; Doushi)
Voiced by: Miu Aoi (visual novel), Rie Hazuki (anime)

Visual Novel Version
The only one out of the trio who has any sort of intelligence and common sense. She is constantly in dismay by the actions of the other two which usually result in trouble. Nonetheless, she cares for them and sticks with them through they journey through China (in Koihime Musō) or during their alliance with the Shoku Kingdom (in Shin Koihime Musō).
Anime version
Enshō's other adviser. While she may seem timid and weak compared to her master, Enshō, and her friend, Bunshū, she is fact the smartest of the three and is the only one with common sense. Despite being the smartest of the three, she isn't really that smart as her IQ is about 34 and she is easily offended if anyone calls her IQ any lower than that (in season 2, Bunshuu offers her IQ has gone up to 36). She is also very conscious about her figure, and when dressing up, always checks her belly fat (she gets really upset whenever Bunshū reminds her of this).

=== Enjutsu ===
Enjutsu Kōro (袁術 公路; Yuan Shu - Gonglu)
Real name: Miu (美羽; Meiyu)
Voiced by: Ayano Makida (visual novel), Eriko Nakamura (anime)

Visual Novel Version
Enshō's cousin in Shin Koihime Musō. Initially fighting independently until defeated by the Go faction. Her life is spared by Sonsaku after she surrenders. She has a lesbian relationship with her assistant Chōkun, and she often ridicules Enshō behind her back.
Anime Version
A selfish and manipulative noble in Shin Koihime Musō who doesn't care about the plight of her people. She conned Enshō into giving her Ryūbi's sword in exchange for an "extremely rare robe that idiots can't see". However she herself was conned by Shuri into returning the sword to Ryūbi in exchange for a "concoction," which is a just an ordinary mug that Shuri got from a gift shop.

=== Chōkun ===
Chōkun (張勲; Zhang Xun)
Real name: Nanano (七乃; Qinai)
Voiced by: Chiaki Takahashi (anime)

Visual Novel Version
Enjutsu's assistant in Shin Koihime Musō who wears a flight attendant-like outfit. Has a lesbian relationship with her superior Enjutsu.
Anime Version
Enjutsu's aide, who is just as manipulative, albeit smarter, than Enjutsu, enough to manipulate Enjutsu herself.

=== Denhō ===
Denhō Genkō (田豊 元皓; Tian Feng - Yuanhao)
Real name: Māchi (真直; Zhenzhi)
Voiced by: Sakura Hanazawa (visual novel)

Visual Novel Version
She is more intellectual than the other members of En.

== Kōkintō (黄巾党, Yellow Turbans) ==
=== Chōkaku ===
Chōkaku (張角; Zhang Jiao)
Real name: Tenhō (天和; Tianhe)
Voiced by: Soyogi Tōno (visual novel), Tae Okajima (anime)

Visual Novel Version
The eldest sister of the Chō sisters. She and her sisters are a famous idol group and the leaders of Kōkintō in Shin Koihime Musō. After being conquered by the Gi faction, she and her sisters join forces with them.
Anime Version
The eldest of three sisters who are trying to make a living by trying out all sorts of show talents, but don't make headway until Ukitsu gives them the book Crucial Keys to the Way of Peace allowing them to create "magical microphones" that actually broadcast their voices, and become popular idol singers in their town. Ryūbi becomes one of their huge fans. However, they are eventually harassed by the local government, who wanted to shut down their performance and venue due to overcrowding. Because of this, they decided to form their army in order to fight the harassment from the local government, leading to a war between the combined forces of Shoku, Gi and En kingdoms (though it started out as a Battle of the Bands pop idol performance between the Cho sisters and the promptly formed team of Enjutsu, Chokun and Kakuka). Eventually, Chōkaku persuaded her sister Choryo to stop using the book and stop the war. She played a crucial part in the final battle of the third season, dressing up like Ryuubi in order to fool Ukitsu since both of them have almost the same appearance. She often wears pink and has long, light pink hair.

=== Chōryō ===
Chōryō (張梁; Zhang Liang)
Real name: Renhō (人和; Renhe)
Voiced by: Maya Sakurano (visual novel), Kozue Yoshizumi (anime)

Visual Novel Version
The youngest sister of the Chō sisters.
Anime Version
Tenhō's second sister. She seems to be more adapted in using magic then her sister, to the point more it seems to have gotten unhealthy. She instigated their fanbase to attack the local government when they try to shut them down and the leader tried to harass Chōhō. She has light green hair tied with a side ponytail and wears green.

=== Chōhō ===
Chōhō (張宝; Zhang Bao)
Real name: Chiihō (地和; Dihe)
Voiced by: Chihiro Umehara (anime)

Visual Novel Version
The middle sister of the Chō sisters.
Anime Version
Tenhō's youngest sister. She is the more level-headed of her sisters and often speaks in a rather deadpan voice. She has short, light purple hair, wears blue and sports glasses.

== Nanban (南蛮, Nanman) ==
=== Mōkaku ===
Mōkaku (孟獲; Meng Huo)
Real name: Mii (美以; Meiyi)
Voiced by: Yuka Kanematsu (visual novel), Miyu Inoue (anime)

Visual Novel Version
Leader of the Nanban (Southern Barbarians) in Shin Koihime Musō. She wears an elephant headdress and is armed with a polearm with a giant paw at the end. After crossing paths with the Shoku Kingdom, she and her group are defeated, and they join forces with the Shoku faction.
Anime Version
Mōkaku officially (in canon) appeared in Shin Koihime Musou: Otome Tairan (although she was seen in the previous season's finale's credits roll). As the Queen of the Nanban, she played an essential part of the story involving gathering ingredients to cure Kashin of her curse. She bit her pet elephant Paya Paya's tail, which resulted in a fight with her and the pet elephant running away, where it was found by Chouhi and company. Chouhi immediately takes to it and keeps it as a pet, but Mōkaku returns after realizing that she indeed bit Paya Paya's tail when she was sleeping. Chouhi initially refused to give it back but eventually returned Paya Paya to her after Mōkaku refused to hurt Paya Paya further when the two struggled for it. When the group realize that Paya Paya is an elephant, they requested Mōkaku to give them the Belly Button Lint of an Elephant, which is needed for the potion. However, Mōkaku refused to give it. To make sure they don't leave without obtaining it, Ryuubi, Shokatsuryou, Chouhi, Batai and Gien devised ways to trap and capture Mōkaku, which they did successfully on 6 consecutive occasions. Fed up being tricked, she and her minions tried summoning their guardian spirit to get rid of the group, however, it turned Paya Paya from a small but cute pink elephant to a gigantic, horrifying mammoth that starts to wreak havoc. Thankfully, the two groups decided to work together and turn Paya Paya back to normal. Eventually, Mōkaku and her minions decided to accompany the group back to Touka village, both to provide support and (for personal reasons) check out the women with rather big breasts, which they often like to play with.
In the OVA, she appeared in the OVA of the second and third season.

=== Mike, Tora and Shamu ===
Mike (ミケ), Tora (トラ), & Shamu (シャム)

Visual Novel Version
Three girls who wear tiger cosplay and are Mōkaku's followers in Shin Koihime Musō. The three of them are original characters.
Anime Version
As in the Visual Novel, they are Mōkaku's followers, shown in the Shin Koihime Musō credits before their first actual appearance in the Shin Koihime Musō OVA.

=== Gotsutotsukotsu ===
Gotsutotsukotsu (兀突骨, Wu Tugu)
Voiced by: Yuna Inamura (anime)

Anime Version
A warrior who appears and tries to make several failed assassination attempts on Gien. She later confronts Gien with a group of her allies and tries to kill her yet again, but fails yet again due to Batai coming to Gien's aid. The reason she tried unsuccessfully to kill Gien was that during a martial arts competition, Gien accidentally killed her older sister in the heat of battle. Kotsu thinks that Gien had to have cheated to have won, as her sister was very strong. Batai convinces Kotsu that Gien herself is strong and has honor, thus won the fight fairly. Kotsu concedes this, but Gien still killed her sister, so she claims that she'll become stronger herself and come back to kill Gien someday. She is last seen running back into a forest. Unlike her historical counterpart, Gotsutotsukotsu is rather more diminutive than the real and gigantic Wutugu.
She appears in the third OVA with a non-speaking role, first seen helping her sister set up the entrance for St. Francesca Academy's Culture Festival and again refereeing the Janken match between Chou'un (as Kacho Kamen) and Gien.

== Others ==
=== Chōsen ===
Chōsen (貂蝉; Diao Chan)
Voiced by: Norio Wakamoto (PC and OVA)

Visual novel version
Chōsen is a big, muscular, bald and pigtailed man wearing a thong in contrast of the legendary beautiful woman as in the historical novel. He often shows interest in Kazuto, much to his dismay and disgust. Even the great Sousou and her mighty subordinate is completely terrified of his presence. In Koihime, he plays a major role in supporting Kazuto in the storyline. In Shin Koihime Musō, he only appears in a special campaign that's unlocked after completing the campaigns of the three warring factions.
Anime version
Chōsen majorly appears in the OVA where he is the school's principal. At first he appears serious, but then he rips his clothes off and displays his sissiness. He was about to kiss Reiha at the end of the OVA after she won the position as student council president, much to the latter's horror.
He makes a cameo appearance in Episode 5 and 10 of Shin Koihime Musō.

=== Kada ===
Kada Genka (華佗 元化; Hua Tuo - Yuanhua)
Voiced by: Nobuyuki Hiyama (PC and anime)

Visual novel version
A new character in Shin Koihime Musō. One of the few males in the game. He is one of the central characters in a special campaign unlocked after completing the campaigns of the three warring factions. He claims to be a doctor, treating the wounds of any injured person he encounters, whether they be friends or foe.
Anime Version
A traveling doctor from a guild known as the Way of the Five Grains (五斗米道, Gotomedō) (a title Kada insists must be voiced out as loudly and enthusiastically as possible each time it is mentioned). He is on a quest to search for and seal away a cursed magic book known as the Crucial Keys to the Way of Peace. He first appears in Shin Koihime Musō when Kan'u's group comes across him along their way and he treats Ryūbi's stomach ailment. His quest takes him to Sōsō, who herself was seeking the book to find a treatment for an ailment that her own physicians could not cure. But when Kata offers to treat it for her, his way of explaining the treatment causes a misunderstanding that gives Sōsō the impression that he is a pervert, and he is chased out in anger by Sōsō. He returns at the season finale where he helps the Kan'u and Sōsō forces defeat the Kōkintō without fighting them.
He returns in the third season, helping General Kanshin trying to find a way to end the curse cast upon her.

=== Himiko ===
Himiko (卑弥呼)
Voiced by: Yōsuke Akimoto (visual novel)

Visual novel version
A new character in Shin Koihime Musō. A white-haired mustached man wearing a loincloth under a blazer (instead of a woman in the historical novel, depicted as the queen of Wa (the ancient Chinese name of Japan)) who shows up in the special campaign unlocked after completing the campaigns of the three warring factions. Apparently has a history with Chōsen. He and Chōsen, along with Kata, travel throughout China, encountering, the (female) generals and warriors from the various factions, often scaring them with their hilarious antics, sometimes to the point where the generals/warriors (and their regiment) end up too frightened to fight in combat. Himiko also makes a cameo appearance (as a shadowed mystery man) at the end of the Go campaign right after the last battle of the campaign when Sōsō's forces are finally defeated.
Anime version
He makes a cameo appearance in episode 6 and 10 of Shin Koihime Musō.

=== Kōsonsan ===
Kōsonsan Hakukei (公孫瓚 伯珪; Gongsun Zan - Bogui)
Real name: Pairen (白蓮; Bailian)
Voiced by: Shiho Kawaragi (visual novel, anime) (credited as Kaname Yuzuki in the visual novel)

Visual novel version
A feudal lord who initially serves under the En faction before allying herself with the Shoku faction. She has a greater role in Shin Koihime Musō wherein she initially helps the Shoku faction accumulate soldiers and supplies at the very beginning as Ryuubi's friend. Her kindness is later repaid when she later joins the Shoku faction as a comrade after her territory is suddenly conquered.
Anime version
A feudal lord who wishes to protect her people from a recent rise of banditry. A noble person who loves her white horses. A particular running gag in the series is that she couldn't help being unrecognized by everyone (though the gag sporadically occurred at the start of Shin Koihime Muso.)
In Shin Koihime Musō it is revealed that she is a childhood friend of Ryūbi Gentoku (the real one), and that she manage to gain possession of the latter's stolen sword before pawning it off to Enshō in exchange for food and support for her people much to her regret (she eventually recognized the sword's scabbard from their time as children). She accompany Ryūbi to try to get the sword back from Enshō but despite finding out Enshō no longer has the sword, Enshō decides to cancel Kōsonsan debt to her as compensation. Much to Kōsonsan's annoyance, Ryūbi often calls her "Pai-pai" instead of her style name (Pairen) since the latter was used to calling her that during their childhood.

=== Riri ===
Riri (璃々; Lili)
Voiced by: Mariya Sumida (visual novel, anime)

Visual novel version
Kōchū's daughter. After being rescued from her captors by Kazuto, she grows quite fond of him--sees him as a father-figure--and hangs out with him whenever she can.
Anime version
The young daughter of Kōchū. In the anime, she was kidnapped by a group who threatened to kill her unless Kōchū helped them in an assassination. She was later rescued and reunited with her mother thanks to Aisha's group. In the second season, she finds a friend in Batai, who she looks up to and often hangs out with her.

=== Saji ===
Saji Genpō (左慈 元放; Zuo Ci - Yuanfang)

Voiced by: Hikaru Midorikawa (credited as Hikaru (氷河流) in the visual novel)

Visual novel version
He tried to steal the mirror that sent Kazuto to the other world. He is a member of the hooded men who are trying to kill Kazuto and the one who hates him the most.

=== Ukitsu ===
Ukitsu (于吉; Yu Ji)

Voiced by: Takehito Koyasu (visual novel, anime)(credited as Jack Cloud in the visual novel)

Visual novel version
He is Saji's partner. He is the one behind Sōsō's brainwashing and Shuyu's betrayal so they can kill Kazuto.
Anime version
A mysterious figure with magical powers. He gives the Chō sisters the magical book known as the "Crucial Keys to the Way of Peace" (太平要術, Taihei Yōjutsu), allowing them to create "magical microphones" in order to jumpstart their careers as idol singers. It is not known at the moment what his real motive is but it appears he using the Chō sisters to make the book gain large amounts of magic. When the Chō sisters reject the powers of the Crucial Keys to the Way of Peace, thus ending the Yellow Turban rebellion, he takes back the book from them before Kada could destroy it. He reappears in Shin Koihime Musou Otome Tairan as an ally and adviser to Chojo, who wanted to take power and rule the land. However, he betrays her by slipping a potion in her drink that turns her into a rat (similar to how Kashin was turned into a cat) in a bid to take over the land himself. He planned to use the "Crucial Keys to the Way of Peace" in order to use the magic gathered by the Chō sisters in the previous installment to control a vast army of powerful Terracotta Warriors so he can use them to take over the land. Thankfully, everyone managed to stop this plan when they teamed up and fought the Terracotta Warriors. Ukitsu's life ended when Ryuubi plunged her sword into his heart, draining his power and turning him into nothing but sand.

=== Chōjō ===
Chōjō (張讓; Zhang Rang)
Voiced by: Akiko Yajima (anime)

Anime version
The villain appearing in Shin Koihime†Musō ~Otome Tairan~.
A eunuch in the high court. She disposed of Kashin by labeling her as a traitor to the court, and then put a curse on her. She later invited Tōtaku into the Kan court. Choujou seems to be plotting something against the warlords, and Kashin may have been only the first in a line of dominoes set to fall.

=== Shibaki ===
Shibaki Suikyō (司馬徽 水鏡; Sima Hui - Shuijing)
Voiced by: Yōko Asagami (anime)

Anime version
Shuri's teacher who is also a scholar and doctor in the countryside. Shibaki has been taking care of Shuri ever since she was orphaned and was separated from her sisters. She loves Shuri, treating her like her own daughter and wanting the best for her. She returns in the second season where she has adopted Hōtō and made a cameo appearance in the third season as a masked narrator detailing the situation about the war near the final half of the season.
In the OVA, she is exploring the Nyanban Island to discover the mysteries of the Island and studying the tribe that lives there.

=== Batō ===
Batō Jusei (馬騰 寿成; Ma Teng - Shoucheng)

Visual Novel Version
Sui's father, who died fighting Sousou when she invades his land.
Anime version
Sui's father, who died falling off his horse due to drunkenness after being embarrassed by a proposed duel with Karin at Kashin's request. The landlord of Sairyō, he was also a martial artist who took great pride in his practice. Sui requested Kakōton (who was there when he felled) hide the fact how he died to preserve his honor but due to a misunderstanding by some witnesses, many believe Kakōton killed him by Sōsō orders, which led Batō seeking revenge against Sōsō.

=== Fake Ryūbi ===
Nise-Ryūbi (偽劉備)
Voiced by: Tomokazu Seki (anime)

Anime version
A charismatic young commander. He is not to be confused with Ryūbi of Shin Koihime Musō as the latter is female and he doesn't have the real name. He first appears in episode 11 leading the Tōka village militia against bandits where Aisha and Rinrin helps them defeat the bandits. Gentoku claims to be a descendant of Ryūshō and was able to get an army from the feudal lord of Tōka as he and his followers were on a quest to defeat the bandits. However, his army was defeated 7 times and which had led to his reputation known as the commander who loses in every battle which at one point the lord was thinking of throwing him out if he lost again. Thanks to the help of Aisha, Rinrin, and Shuri's strategies, Gentoku and his men were able to defeat the bandits one by one. He is also good with women as he was the first person to recognize that Aisha was the famous Beautiful Black-haired Bandit Fighter without the usual skepticism of her beauty, and he even charmed General Kashin herself, earning her trust.
As his reputation grows, along with his alleged relationship with Aisha (as he resembled her late older brother), Rinrin began to distrust him as she suspect something suspicious about him. These suspicions were confirmed when Gentoku and his men attended an imperial war meeting held by General Kashin, Tōka is attacked by a large army of bandits, and he refused to go and help the village, instead is more focus on his mission to defeat rebels, given to him by Kashin. Aisha tries to make him reconsider but he tries to seduce Aisha to join him in his mission instead and forget the village. Realizing that Gentoku never did care about saving people and was only interested fame, glory and his twisted view of justice, Aisha slaps him and leaves him along with Bachō to save their friends. Without those two, Gentoku's army was defeated in battle where he receive a severe scolding from General Kashin. He tries to save face by returning to Tōka only to meet two unexpected guests, Kōchū and Riri who immediately recognize him as the man who kidnapped Riri and threatened Kōchū to commit assassination. (Why he did this is unknown but from what Kōchū has said about him, it was part of his crimes that he committed prior to falsely taking Ryūbi's name.) His identity exposed, he runs away where Kōchū concludes he was nothing more than a no good impostor who lied about his ancestry and identity to gain fame.
In Shin Koihime Musō, it is revealed that he stole the name Ryūbi Gentoku from a girl (the real Ryūbi Gentoku) along with her sword prior to his appearance in the first series. He then becomes the target of the said girl, who intends to retrieve her sword and clear her name. Whatever happened to him after this is unknown, but most presumably he is either in hiding or captured and imprisoned for impersonation. Kōchū could never forgive him for kidnapping her daughter Riri, vowing to kill him in the most hideous ways possible, much to the disturbance of those present during that vow.

=== Josho ===
Josho Genchoku (徐庶 元直; Xu Shu - Yuanzhi)

The fellow disciple of Shuri and Hinari at Suikyo's school. She appears only in the name in the Shoku route.
She was Shuri's best friend when they were at the school. She is called "Genchoku-chan" by the two. Like Shuri and Hinari, she is skilled in cooking, especially in making confectionery.

=== Ryūshō ===
Ryūshō (劉璋; Liu Zhang)

Lord to Shion, Kikyō and En'ya. Only his name appears in Shoku route.
Due to his tyranny and his clan's power struggle, the people under his rule welcomed Ryūbi, who had been chased away from Joshū.

=== Kōso ===
Kōso (黄祖; Huang Zu)

Voiced by: Kazuha (visual novel)

Visual Novel Version
A new character first introduced into Shin Koihime † Musou - Kakumei ~ Son Go no Ketsumyaku ~.
One of the warlord ruling with an iron hand. Hates Go and its leader Sonken Bundai, which is constantly plotting and scheming. In order to bring her plans into action, she made an alliance with Kōchū Kanshō and Gien Bunchō. The commander of the Kannei and Taishiji. After the betrayal of both of their wards were able to make plans and kill Bundai, running through her head. After the overthrow of the Empire Kan resisted the soldiers Go led by Sonsaku Hakufu, but lost and then went on the run. In the end she was overtaken by her former ward Kannei and she was killed.
