= Backlash =

Backlash may refer to:

== Literature ==
- Backlash: The Undeclared War Against American Women, a 1991 book by Susan Faludi
- Backlash (Star Wars novel), a 2010 novel by Aaron Allston
- Backlash (Marc Slayton), a comic book character from Wildstorm Productions
- Backlash (alternative title to: A Plague on Both Your Causes), a novel by John Brunner

== Music ==
- Backlash (Bad English album), 1991
- Backlash (Freddie Hubbard album), 1967
- Backlash, an album by Nina Simone
- "Backlash", a 1991 song by Joan Jett from the album Notorious
- "Backlash" (song), by 10 Years
- "Backlash", a 2014 instrumental by DubVision, edited by Martin Garrix

== Film ==
- Backlash (1947 film), an American film noir starring Jean Rogers
- Backlash (1956 film), an American Western starring Richard Widmark
- Backlash (1986 film), an Australian drama directed by Bill Bennett
- Backlash (1994 film), an American film starring Sunny Doench

== Other media ==
- WWE Backlash, an annual World Wrestling Entertainment Pay-per-view event
- Backlash, a Demolition Vehicle in the video game Blast Corps

== Other uses ==
- Backlash (engineering), clearance between mating components
- Backlash (sociology), a strong adverse reaction to an idea, action, or object
- Backlash (pressure group), a UK group opposing the 2008 law criminalising possession of "extreme pornography"

== See also ==
- Backflash (disambiguation)
- Backslash, a typographical mark
- Blacklash, or Whiplash, a Marvel Comics character
