= Eriko Nakamura =

Japanese voice actress

- 中村 繪里子
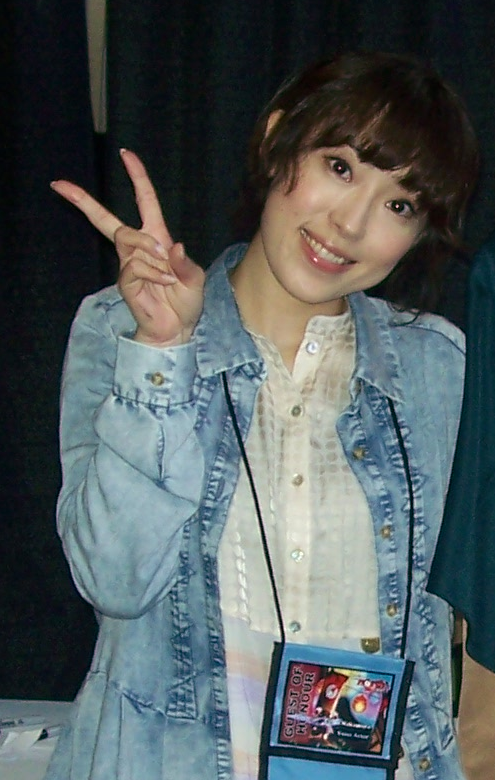
- Eriko Nakamura at Anime North 2013
- Born: November 19, 1981 (age 44); Kanagawa Prefecture, Japan
- Occupations: Actress; voice actress; singer
- Years active: 2002–present
- Agent: Arts Vision
- Spouse: Unknown (m. 2019)

Eriko Nakamura (中村 繪里子, Nakamura Eriko; born November 19, 1981) is a Japanese actress and singer. In 2014, at the 4th Newtype Anime awards, she won a voice actor award (female).

== Biography ==
After going through the Japan Narration Acting Institute, she joined Arts Vision. Nakamura was 19 years old when she passed her first audition.

In October 2014, she was appointed as Tokushima Anime Ambassador.

On November 19, 2019, Nakamura announced that she had married.

== Filmography ==
=== Anime ===
Bold denotes leading roles.

- Ballad of a Shinigami, Sawako
- Ben-To, Chapatsu
- Caligula, Mirei
- Concrete Revolutio, Fuurouta
- Gintama, Matsuko
- Hetalia: Axis Powers, **Belgium**
- Kaichuu, Gonzuburou Sasaki
- Hachigatsu no Cinderella Nine, Momoko Kakehashi
- Hoshizora e Kakaru Hashi, **Ui Nakatsugawa**
- Koi to Senkyo to Chocolate, **Chisato Sumiyoshi**
- Shin Koihime Musō, Enjutsu (Miu)
- The Idolmaster franchise, **Haruka Amami** (except for Idolmaster: Xenoglossia)
- Magi: The Labyrinth of Magic, Dunya Musta'sim
- Oniichan no Koto Nanka Zenzen Suki Janain Dakara ne!!, Haruka Katō
- Oretachi ni Tsubasa wa Nai, Youji Haneda (childhood)
- Popotan, Male student
- Space Battleship Yamato 2199, Mikage Kiryū
- Walkure Romanze: Shōjo Kishi Monogatari, Noel Marres Ascot

=== Video games ===
- Aiyoku no Eustia, Licia de novus Yurii
- Akashic Records, Brunhilde
- Akiba's Trip, Mana Kitada
- Akiba's Trip 2, Shion Kasugai
- Armored Core 3, Extras
- Azur Lane, HMS Victorious
- Dungeon Travelers 2, Monica Macy
- Eden*, Lavinia F. Asai
- Freedom Wars, Beatrice 'Lily' Anastasi
- Grimoire ~ Shiritsu Grimoire Mahou Gakuen ~, Ren Nanjo
- Moero Chronicle, Coco
- Rage of Bahamut, Pamela
