= Flashback! Rock Classics of the '70s =

Flashback!: Rock Classics Of The '70s

Compilation album by Various Artists
- Released: 1991
- Genre: Rock
- Length: 58:41
- Label: Realm Records

Alternative cover

Professional ratings
Review scores
Source	Rating
Allmusic	4.5/5 stars

Flashback! Rock Classics of the '70s is a charity album. This compilation is filled with the names of artists who rarely agree to allow their songs to appear on compilations. Released through Realm Records, it benefits the T.J. Martell Foundation, which contributes money to cancer and AIDS research. These tracks come from five of the six major labels of the day, BMG being the exception.

== Track listing ==
No.	Title	Writer(s)	Artist	Length
1.	"Smoke on the Water" (Machine Head (1972))	Ian Gillan; Ritchie Blackmore; Roger Glover; Jon Lord; Ian Paice	Deep Purple	5:40
2.	"Hot Blooded" (Double Vision (1978))	Lou Gramm; Mick Jones	Foreigner	4:23
3.	"Ramblin' Man" (Brothers and Sisters (1973))	Richard Betts	The Allman Brothers Band	4:48
4.	"Badlands" (Darkness on the Edge of Town (1978))	Bruce Springsteen	Bruce Springsteen	4:02
5.	"Money" (The Dark Side of the Moon (1973))	Roger Waters	Pink Floyd	6:23
6.	"I Want You to Want Me" (In Color (1977))	Rick Nielsen	Cheap Trick	3:39
7.	"Can't Get Enough" (Bad Company (1974))	Mick Ralphs	Bad Company	4:14
8.	"Carry On Wayward Son" (Leftoverture (1976))	Kerry Livgren	Kansas	5:23
9.	"I Shot the Sheriff" (461 Ocean Boulevard (1974))	Bob Marley	Eric Clapton	4:23
10.	"Let's Go" (Candy-O (1979))	Ric Ocasek	The Cars	3:33
11.	"Love the One You're With" (Stephen Stills (1970))	Stephen Stills	Stephen Stills	3:05
12.	"Freebird" (Lynyrd Skynyrd (Pronounced 'Lĕh-'nérd 'Skin-'nérd) (1973))	Allen Collins; Ronnie Van Zant	Lynyrd Skynyrd	9:08
Total length:				58:41

== Band credits ==
- Deep Purple appear courtesy of Warner Brothers Records.
- The Allman Brothers Band and Eric Clapton appear courtesy of PolyGram Records.
- Bruce Springsteen appears courtesy of Columbia Records.
- Pink Floyd appear courtesy of Capitol Records.
- Cheap Trick appear courtesy of Epic Records.
- Bad Company, Foreigner and Stephen Stills appear courtesy of Atlantic Records.
- Kansas appear courtesy of CBS Associated Records.
- The Cars appear courtesy of Elektra Records.
- Lynyrd Skynyrd appear courtesy of MCA Records.

== Production ==
- Compilation Producer: Marshall Wilcoxen
- Art Director: Chris Thompson
- Package design: Jeff Dilena
- Photography: Steve Halin
- Special thanks: Charles Zelebski

Information for band credits and production were taken from the album's liner notes.
