= Flashback Media Group =

Swedish media company

Flashback Media Group AB
- Company type: Website
- Industry: Mass media
- Founded: 1998
- Headquarters: Sweden
- Key people: Jan Axelsson
- Number of employees: Unknown
- Website: flashback-mediagroup.se flashback.se

Flashback Media Group AB is a Swedish media company that publishes magazines and books. It runs the website "Flashback". The company is best known for their online forum, Flashback Forum, whose slogan is "Yttrandefrihet på riktigt" ('Freedom of speech for real').

== History ==
Flashback originates from the local fanzine Dead or Alive founded and published on 25 February 1983 by then 14-year-old Jan Axelsson in Norrköping. It developed into multiple projects focusing on different aspects of subcultures; mainly punk, and changed its name to Flashback in February 1993.

Flashback's website was first published in June 1995 as a big supporter of copyleft. The company publishes "Scandinavia's biggest neutral newsletter" with over 120,000 subscribers on a monthly basis. The proclaimed goal is to express underground opinions. The website has on multiple occasions been shut down by authorities and has been fined hundreds of thousands of SEK.

In 2003, a trial in the Market Court ruled against Flashback Media Group AB and Jan Axelsson, determining that the forum had displayed illegal advertising for equipment for pirate decryption of cable TV, and ruling that the publishing company had not exercised sufficient editorial control over the content of the Flashback forum. As a consequence of the ongoing trial, the forum was shut down at the end of 2002. Flashback Media Group AB and Jan Axelsson were each fined 400,000 SEK on probation and were forced to pay the trial costs of 250,000 SEK. Flashback opened again in 2003. Between 2003 and 2010 it was based in England and owned by Flashback Enterprises Ltd. Since 2010 it is based in New York, USA and it is owned by Flashback International Inc.

In October 2010 Flashback Media Group AB started Travel Forum, a travel website with articles, guides, reviews and discussions of travel-related content.

In 2011–12, the aliases Lodjuren, Radhusbiff, mickepickepö, conter1, hello, and legoboy of Flashback and the blog Terjade foton were awarded a honourable mention at the 2011 Guldspaden, an annual award for investigative journalism, for having revealed photographic manipulation in the work of nature photographer Terje Hellesø.

Flashback Media Group also own a Swedish erotic literature site.
