= Princess Holiday =

2002 video game

- Princess Holiday: Korogaru Ringotei Senya Ichiya
- Japanese limited edition Dreamcast cover art, featuring Leticia.

Princess Holiday 〜転がるりんご亭千夜一夜〜 (Purinsesu Horidē ~Korogaru Ringotei Senya Ichiya~)
- Genre: Romantic comedy, Fantasy, Harem
- Video game
- Developer: August
- Publisher: August (Windows); Alchemist (DC, PS2)
- Platform: Windows, Dreamcast, PlayStation 2
- Released: JP: September 27, 2002 (Windows); JP: May 29, 2003 (DC); JP: May 27, 2004 (PS2)
- Light novel
- Written by: Rei Arisawa
- Illustrated by: Bekkankō
- Published by: Harvest
- Imprint: Harvest Novels
- Published: February 1, 2003
- Original video animation
- Directed by: Hiroaki Nakashima
- Produced by: Lemon Heart
- Studio: Tadama Film
- Released: March 25, 2004 – May 25, 2004
- Runtime: 30 minutes each
- Episodes: 2

Princess Holiday: Korogaru Ringotei Senya Ichiya (Princess Holiday ～転がるりんご亭千夜一夜～, Purinsesu Horidē ~Korogaru Ringotei Senya Ichiya~) (English translation: Princess Holiday: Rolling Apple Pavilion's One Thousand and One Nights), usually shortened to Princess Holiday, is a Japanese adult visual novel developed by August and released for Windows PCs on September 27, 2002. It was later ported to the Dreamcast and PlayStation 2 consoles. Princess Holiday's story follows Cliff Cloud, who has to help the princess, Leticia La Mew Symphonia, stay undercover under the name Leticia Apple in his hometown.

Princess Holiday enjoyed high sales, charting five times in the national sales ranking of bishōjo games. The gameplay follows a branching plot line which offers pre-determined scenarios with courses of interaction, and focuses on the appeal of the five female main characters by the player character. Princess Holiday has made transitions into other media, such as a light novel, art book, albums, and a 2-episode original video animation (OVA) series produced by Tadama Film.

== Gameplay ==
Average dialogue and narrative in Princess Holiday depicting Leticia (left) and Shilphy (right).

Princess Holiday is a romance visual novel in which the player assumes the role of Cliff Cloud. Much of its gameplay is spent reading the text that appears on the screen, which represents the story's narrative and dialogue. The text is accompanied by character sprites, which represent who Cliff is talking to, over background art. Throughout the game, the player encounters CG artwork at certain points in the story, which take the place of the background art and character sprites. Princess Holiday follows a branching plot line with multiple endings, and depending on the decisions that the player makes during the game, the plot will progress in a specific direction.

In the original Windows version, there are five main plot lines that the player will have the chance to experience, one for each of the heroines in the story. The DC version extend Diana's scenario, allowing players to try and win her over as well. Also, the port increases the number of endings to twelve, two for each heroine. Throughout gameplay, the player is given multiple options to choose from, and text progression pauses at these points until a choice is made. Some decisions can lead the game to end prematurely and offer an alternative ending to the plot. To view all plot lines in their entirety, the player will have to replay the game multiple times and choose different choices to further the plot to an alternate direction. In the Windows version, there are scenes depicting Cliff and a given heroine having sex. However, later ports remove the adult content.

== Plot and characters ==
Princess Holiday takes place in a medieval town near a kingdom. After travelling as a bard for three years, Cliff Cloud (クリフ・クラウド, Kurifu Kuraudo; voiced by Tatsuya Hirai) returns to his hometown Symphonia Kingdom, where his kind and gentle younger sister Shilphy Cloud (シルフィ・クラウド, Shirufi Kuraudo; voiced by Yasuko Shiina) lives. Shilphy is a probationary sister at a church run by her parents, and she handles the church alone because her parents are away on propagation. She also teaches children in the slums and they like her very much. By chance, Cliff happens to meet the kingdom's princess Leticia La Mew Symphonia (レティシア・ラ・ミュウ・シンフォニア, Retishia Ra Myū Shinfonia; voiced by Kanon Torii), who is also the main heroine of Princess Holiday. She is running away from her home, and needs to accustom to the outside world; this is difficult due to her naive personality. To help conceal her true identity, Leticia gives the false name Leticia Apple (レティシア・アップル, Retishia Appuru) to people who don't know she is a princess. She starts to work at the Korogaru Ringotei pub.

Cliff and Shilphy have a childhood friend called Eleanor Fortworth (エレノア・フォートワース, Erenoa Fōtowāsu; voiced by Erena Kaibara), she is a knight who guards Leticia. Eleanor is good at swordsmanship and she regrets that Cliff abandoned the skill. Being the daughter of a dressmaker, she is also good at sewing. Rachel Harvest (レイチェル・ハーベスト, Reicheru Hābesuto; voiced by Minami Hokuto) is the main attraction at the Korogaru Ringotei pub. She acts as an older sister to Cliff, Shilphy and Eleanor, and she is a favorite with regular customers. As Rachel hates the monarchy and the nobility, Leticia keeps her status secret from Rachel. One of the regular customers at Korogaru Ringotei includes Lapis Mercurius Freya (ラピス・メルクリウス・フレイア, Rapisu Merukuriusu Fureia; voiced by Sanae Nonoda), who wears a mantle and a hat and lives near the lake. She has been seen flying on a broom and is known as the "Witch beside the Lake". Lapis has extensive knowledge of many things but knows little of love. Diana Peschka Holly Eryngii (ディアナ・ペシュカ・ホリー・エリンギ, Diana Peshuka Horī Eringi; voiced by Omi Minami (DC/PS2) / Don Ōhana (OVA)) is a daughter of Prime Minister Eryngii. At a ball, she falls in love with Cliff at first sight. Later, she works at Korogaru Ringotei with Leticia. Though she was a very minor character in the original PC version, she was popular with fans, so her scenario was added in the console versions.

== Development and release ==
Princess Holiday, self-described as a "fantastic princess ADV", is August's second visual novel to produce, after Binary Pot. The game's scenario was written by Taku Sakakibara, whilst original character designs were drawn by Bekkankō; music was composed by KeNji. Sakakibara and Bekkankō would contribute as the main production staff on August's subsequent visual novel, Tsuki wa Higashi ni Hi wa Nishi ni: Operation Sanctuary. Princess Holiday is playable on the NScripter engine.

The first press edition was originally released as two CD ROMs for Windows PCs on September 27, 2002. August re-released Princess Holiday as a regular edition for PCs on October 9, 2003. Alchemist ported an all-ages version of the visual novel without any adult content to the Dreamcast console on May 29, 2003 in both limited and regular editions. An all-ages PlayStation 2 version was released by Alchemist on May 27, 2004.

== Related media ==
=== Printed media ===
A 230-page light novel (ISBN 4-434-02799-9) written by Rei Arisawa and illustrated by Bekkankō was published by Harvest under its Harvest Novels imprint on February 1, 2003. On March 7, 2003, a 111-page art book (ISBN 978-4797322620) titled "Princess Holiday - Korogaru Ringotei Senya Ichiya - Visual Fan Book" (Princess Holiday‐転がるりんご亭千夜一夜‐ビジュアルファンブック, Purinsesu Horidē ‐ Korogaru Ringotei Senya Ichiya ‐ Bijuaru Fan Bukku) was released by SoftBank Creative under its Raspberry Books imprint. It contains character and story explanations, audio drama, illustration galleries, staff interviews, and more.

=== Anime ===
A 2-episode hentai original video animation (OVA) series was directed by Hiroaki Nakashima, and produced by Tadama Film. Lemon Heart released the anime as two DVD volumes between March 25 and May 25, 2004. The complete edition was released containing both episodes on May 26, 2006. Limited edition DVDs were also released.

=== Music and audio CDs ===
The opening to Princess Holiday is "Niji no Kanata e" (虹の彼方へ) sung by Kanon Torii, who voiced Leticia in the visual novel, respectively. Torii also sung the visual novel's ending theme "Kokoro Kara Tsuzuku Mirai: My Fate" (心から続く未来 〜My Fate〜). An original soundtrack was released on December 28, 2002, sold at Comic Market 63. Another CD came bundled with the Dreamcast release of Princess Holiday, containing the ending theme. Princess Holiday's OVA adaptation contains two ending themes, one of them the game's original opening, "Niji no Kanata e", and the other is "Beloved You", of which Torii also sung.

== Reception ==
According to a national sales ranking of bishōjo games sold in Japan, the PC release of Princess Holiday premiered at No. 2 out of fifty titles, before further charting No. 13 in October 2002. The ranking fell to No. 25 during mid-October. Princess Holiday's ranking did not change in November 2002. Then in mid-November, Princess Holiday made its fifth appearance in the charts at No. 44. The Japanese video game magazine Famitsu reviewed the Dreamcast port of the game and gave it a total review score of 25/40 (out of the four individual review scores of 5, 6, 6, and 7). Dorimaga gave the Dreamcast port a total review score of 8,0 (out of the three individual review scores of 9, 7, and 8).

Two character popularity polls were held on the official website. The first, a pre-release poll, took place between August 21 and September 25, 2002. A total of 25011 votes were cast, and Leticia received the majority of votes (Leticia: 8045, Shilphy: 7571, Eleanor: 2909, Rachel: 1401, Lapis: 5085). Between October 9 and November 8, 2002, another poll was conducted, gathering a total of 35106 votes; this time, Shilphy received the majority of votes (Leticia: 8209, Shilphy: 8223, Eleanor: 6403, Rachel: 1226, Lapis: 6381, Diana: 3260). As a reward, Bekkankō designed a downloadable wallpaper featuring Leticia and Shilphy. The second poll includes minor characters from Princess Holiday.

=== Appearances in other media ===
Leticia La Mew Symphonia makes a guest appearance in the first manga volume of Yoake Mae yori Ruriiro na. Various characters from Princess Holiday appear in the August Fan Box, which is a fan disc of sorts to August's visual novels Binary Pot, Princess Holiday, and Tsuki wa Higashi ni Hi wa Nishi ni: Operation Sanctuary.
