= Your Diary =

== Arts, entertainment, and media ==
- Your Diary (visual novel)
- Your Diary, a song by Franz Ferdinand on the B-side of the single Do You Want To
