= Alchemist (company) =

Japanese video game publisher

Alchemist Co., Ltd.
- Native name: 株式会社アルケミスト
- Company type: Private
- Industry: Video games
- Founded: August 14, 1991; 34 years ago
- Defunct: January 18, 2017; 9 years ago
- Fate: Bankrupt
- Headquarters: Koto-ku, Tokyo, Japan
- Area served: Japan
- Key people: Shigenobu Urano (president)
- Products: Visual novels
- Number of employees: 24

Alchemist Co., Ltd. (株式会社アルケミスト, Kabushiki gaisha Arukemisuto) was a Japanese video game publisher. It specialized in the development of visual novels for use on home video game consoles such as the PlayStation 2 and the Dreamcast.

== History ==
=== Alchemist era ===
The company entered video game business in 2002.

In April 1, 2016, Alchemist filed its own bankruptcy to Sapporo court, with the same court began to process the request in April 5, 2016. The company's legal entity was unregistered in January 18, 2017.

== Games published ==
=== Dreamcast ===
- Baldr Force EXE
- Chocolat: Maid Cafe Curio
- Kimi ga Nozomu Eien
- Princess Holiday: Korogaru Ringotei Senyaichiya
- Tsuki wa Higashi ni Hi wa Nishi ni: Operation Sanctuary
- Wind: A Breath of Heart

=== PlayStation 2 ===
- Aria the Natural: Tooi Yume no Mirage
- Aria the Origination: Aoi Hoshi no El Cielo
- Baldr Force EXE
- Baldr Bullet: Equilibrium
- Binchō-tan
- Chocolat: Maid Cafe Curio
- Duel Savior Destiny
- Hana to Otome ni Shukufuku o: Harukaze no Okurimono
- Haru no Ashioto: Step of Spring
- Higurashi no Naku Koro ni Matsuri
  - Higurashi no Naku Koro ni Matsuri: Kakera Asobi
  - Pachi-Slot Higurashi no Naku Koro ni Matsuri
- Katakamuna: Ushinawareta Ingaritsu
- Koisuru Otome to Shugo no Tate: The Shield of AIGIS
- Kono Aozora ni Yakusoku o: Melody of Sun and Sea
- Otome wa Boku ni Koishiteru
- Parfait Chocolat Second Style
- Princess Holiday: Korogaru Ringotei Senyaichiya
- Pure x Cure Recovery
- Sekirei: Mirai Kara no Okurimono
- Sugar + Spice!: Anoko no Suteki na Nanimokamo
- Suzunone Seven!: Rebirth Knot
- Triggerheart Exelica Enhanced
- Tsuki wa Higashi ni Hi wa Nishi ni: Operation Sanctuary
- Wind: A Breath of Heart

=== PlayStation 3 ===
- Gal Gun
- Umineko no Naku Koro ni: Majo to Suiri no Rondo
- Umineko no Naku Koro ni Chiru: Shinjitsu to Gensō no Nocturne

=== PlayStation 4 ===
- Gal Gun: Double Peace

=== PlayStation Portable ===
- Dead End: Orchestral Manoeuvres in the Dead End
- Higurashi Daybreak Portable
- Higurashi Daybreak Portable Mega Edition
- Kaitō Tenshi Twin Angel: Toki to Sekai no Meikyū
- Koisuru Otome to Shugo no Tate Portable
- Onigokko!
- No Fate! Only the Power of Will
- Otome wa Boku ni Koishiteru Portable
- Otome wa Boku ni Koishiteru: Futari no Elder
- Ouka Sengoku Portable
- Saka Agari Hurricane Portable
- Saki Portable
- Soreyuke! Burunyanman Portable
- Umineko no Naku Koro ni Portable
- Ren'ai 0 Kilometer
- Gaku Ou:The Royal Seven Stars
- 1/2 summer+
- Your Diary +

=== PlayStation Vita ===
- Gal Gun: Double Peace

=== Xbox 360 ===
- Gal Gun
- No Fate! Only the Power of Will
- Ōgon Musōkyoku X

=== Nintendo DS ===
- Akai Ito DS
- Akai Ito Destiny DS
- Chō Kowai Hanashi DS: Ao no Shō
- Higurashi no Naku Koro Ni Kizuna
- Nicola Kanshū: Model * Oshare Audition

=== Nintendo 3DS ===
- Downtown no Gaki no Tsukai ya Arahende!! Zettai ni Tsukamatte wa Ikenai Ghasu Kurobikari Land
- Nicola Kanshū: Model * Oshare Audition 2
