= Fortune Arterial =

2008 video game

- Fortune Arterial original visual novel cover.

フォーチュン アテリアル (Fōchun Ateriaru)
- Genre: Harem, Drama, Fantasy, Romance
- Manga

Fortune Arterial Character's Prelude
- Written by: August
- Illustrated by: Akane Sasaki
- Published by: ASCII Media Works
- Magazine: Dengeki G's Magazine (former); Dengeki G's Festival! Comic
- Original run: September 2007 – April 2008
- Volumes: 1
- Manga
- Written by: August
- Illustrated by: Miki Kodama
- Published by: Kadokawa Shoten
- Magazine: Comptiq
- Original run: November 2007 – September 2011
- Volumes: 7
- Video game
- Developer: August
- Publisher: August
- Genre: Eroge, Visual novel
- Platform: PC
- Released: January 25, 2008
- Anime television series

Fortune Arterial: Akai Yakusoku
- Directed by: Munenori Nawa
- Produced by: Yoshikazu Beniya; Naoshi Imamoto
- Written by: Katsumi Hasegawa
- Music by: Takaaki Anzai
- Studio: Zexcs; Feel
- Original network: TV Tokyo
- Original run: October 9, 2010 – December 25, 2010
- Episodes: 12 + OVA

Fortune Arterial (フォーチュン アテリアル, Fōchun Ateriaru) is a Japanese adult visual novel, developed by August, released as a limited-edition version on January 25, 2008, playable on Windows PCs as a DVD. Fortune Arterial is August's fifth game, preceded by other titles such as Tsuki wa Higashi ni Hi wa Nishi ni: Operation Sanctuary, and Yoake Mae yori Ruriiro na. A manga based on the story, drawn by Akane Sasaki, was serialized between the September 2007 and April 2008 issues of ASCII Media Works' Dengeki G's Magazine; the manga transferred to ASCII Media Works' Dengeki G's Festival! Comic in April 2008. A second manga started serialization in the November 2007 issue of Kadokawa Shoten's gaming magazine Comptiq, illustrated by Miki Kodama. A 12-episode anime adaptation produced by Zexcs and Feel aired in Japan between October and December 2010.

== Gameplay ==
The gameplay requires little interaction from the player as a majority of the game is spent simply reading text that appears on the screen. This text represents either dialogue between the various characters or the inner thoughts of the protagonist. Every so often, the player will come to a "decision point" where they must choose from options that are displayed on the screen, typically two to three at a time. During these times, gameplay pauses until a choice is made that furthers the plot in a specific direction, depending on which choice the player makes. There are five main plot lines that the player will have the chance to experience, one for each of the heroines in the story. In order to view the five plot lines to their entirety, the player will have to replay the game multiple times and choose different choices during the decision points in order to further the plot in an alternate direction.

== Plot ==
Fortune Arterial's story revolves around the male protagonist Kohei Hasekura, who transfers into a prestigious public school in the style of a Western six-year school encompassing junior-high and high school students. The school, named Shuchikan Academy (修智館学院, Shūchikan Gakuin), is on an island named Tamatsu Island (珠津島, Tamatsushima) off-shore from mainland Japan, and the only way to get there is by boat. Soon after transferring, he discovers that one of the students in the class next door to his, Erika Sendo, is in fact a type of vampire.

== Characters ==
=== Main characters ===
Kohei Hasekura (支倉 孝平, Hasekura Kōhei)
Voiced by: Shinsuke Nakamoto (Drama CD) / Daisuke Ono (anime), Natsumi Takamori (childhood in anime)
Kohei is the protagonist of the story and is a fifth-year student. He has lived on the island previously and was friends with the Yuki sisters. Since he moved away he has cultivated a habit of not making friends due to constant school transfers (since he would have to move away as soon as he made new friends, he decided not to bother making friends in the first place). Now that he has returned to the island on his own and entered Shuchikan Academy, he plans to stay for a while.

Erika Sendo (千堂 瑛里華, Sendō Erika)
Voiced by: Rie Kanda (credited as Sakiko Mimura in the PC version)
Erika is a fifth-year student as well as the student council vice-president. She is a vampire. She excels in literature classes and martial arts, and is very attractive, making her popular in her school. She has an inquisitive personality and likes to do things directly. Once she has her mind set on something, she becomes very pushy and will take her time making plans to make sure she gets her way. Her older brother Iori is the student council president.

Shiro Togi (東儀 白, Tōgi Shiro)
Voiced by: Yukari Minegishi (credited as Airi Himekawa in the PC version)
Shiro is a delicate fourth-year student who is very shy. She was introduced to the student council by her brother who was already on the council, and it was decided that Shiro would become the treasurer. However, she is often missing from student council meetings after school and is only known for serving tea to the student council. Shiro joins an organization named "Laurel Ring" in order to support a chapel and she cherishes a white pet rabbit named Yukimaru (雪丸) at the chapel.

Kiriha Kuze (紅瀬 桐葉, Kuze Kiriha)
Voiced by: Suzune Kusunoki (PC) / Erika Narumi (anime)
Kiriha is one of Kohei's classmates. She is most often seen alone and does not talk much, even when spoken to directly. She does not have many interests, and is in no clubs. She has been exceptional in math ever since she was young. She is a vampire servant, which makes her immortal and has given her superhuman powers, though she does not need blood and has lost her sense of taste.

Kanade Yuki (悠木 かなで, Yūki Kanade)
Voiced by: Fūka Hinami (PC) / Hitomi Nabatame (anime)
Kanade is Kohei's childhood friend and Haruna's older sister. She is constantly in high spirits, and likes to do things at her own pace. She loves her younger sister so much that she says that if she had been born a man from another family, she would have definitely married Haruna eventually. She often calls her sister "Hina". She is the resident adviser in the Academy dormitory.

Haruna Yuki (悠木 陽菜, Yūki Haruna)
Voiced by: Sakura Takatsuki (PC) / Hiroko Taguchi (anime)
Haruna is in Kohei's class and is also a childhood friend of his. She has a bright personality, and enjoys helping others. She lost the memories of her early childhood (including Kohei) after an accident.

Miya Togi (東儀 観夜, Tōgi Miya)
Miya is a new female character included in the PlayStation 3 version, Fortune Arterial: Akai Yakusoku.

=== Secondary characters ===
Iori Sendo (千堂 伊織, Sendō Iori)
Voiced by: Kevin Spicy (PC) / Junichi Suwabe (anime)
Iori is Erika's older brother, and is the student council president. He is a huge jokester unlike that to the serious Togi. Just like his sister, he too is a vampire. He gives off the air of a male model, and many girls in his school want to go out with him. He is generally popular with everyone in his school.

Seichiro Togi (東儀 征一郎, Tōgi Seiichirō)
Voiced by: Rei Takatori (PC) / Tomohiro Tsuboi (anime)
Seiichirō is also the treasurer of the student council, along with his sister Shiro. He is very kind with his sister, and may have a sister complex. He used to be the president of the Japanese archery club.

Tsukasa Hachimandaira (八幡平 司, Hachimandaira Tsukasa)
Voiced by: Kyōtarō Hai (PC) / Kentarō Itō (anime)
Tsukasa is one of Kohei's classmates otherwise known as "Heiji". After Kohei transferred schools, he became a good friend of his. He may seem like a delinquent, but he is very friendly. He has a twin sister.

Shizuko Amaike (天池 志津子, Amaike Shizuko)
Voiced by: Tomomi Misaki (PC) / Chizuko Hoshino (anime)
Shizuko is the caretaker of a certain church on the island, as well as the one in-charge of the female side of the school dormitory. She is always wearing a sister outfit. Her Christian name is "Margarita", while most students address her as "Sister Amaike" instead. Also she is known around campus for carrying a frying pan. She is typically sister-like and a no-nonsense type of person most of the time, however she is also known to be very scary when she loses her temper. Kohei fears her as "The Person who cannot take jokes". Kanade calls her "Maru-chan" and Iori calls her "Shizuko-chan", which she doesn't seem too happy about.

Masanori Aoto (青砥 正則, Aoto Masanori)
Voiced by: Kazuya Ichijō (PC/anime)
Masanori is the homeroom teacher of Kohei, Haruna, Kiriha and Tsukasa's class, as well as the one in-charge of the male side of the school dormitory. He teaches Chemistry. Has a mild personality. Kohei saw him riding a scooter without a license and thinks of him as "Someone who rides a stolen bike". Takes towards an independence and autonomy approach in education. He is usually known by the nickname "Aonori", while Kanade calls him "Noripii". Was known to be a troublemaker during his younger days.

Art Club President (美術部部長; Bijutsubu Buchō)
Voiced by: Keito Mizukiri (PC/anime)
Her name is unknown. She is a sixth-year student as well as the president of the Art Club. She is troubled over the declining in the number of members in the Art Club. Has a very straightforward personality. Tsukasa works part-time at the sushi bar which is owned by her family, as well as her residence. Kohei falls in love with her if you cannot end up with any of the five heroines, which is known as the Bad End Route.

Kaya Sendo (千堂 伽耶, Sendō Kaya)
Voiced by: Ōka Miseri (PC) / Kaori Mizuhashi (anime)
Kaya is Erika and Iori's mother. Estimated to be at least 251 years old, yet she looks like a child, giving people the image that she is Iori and Erika's younger sister instead. Erika looks like a splitting image of her, the only difference being Erika's more matured body and that Kaya's eyes are constantly red in color, which every vampire has when they have their vampiric impulses.

== Development ==
=== Release history ===
August first announced the production of a new visual novel at Comiket 71, and on February 21, 2007, they made the official announcement for Fortune Arterial on their official website. The game was first introduced to the public in Japan as a limited-edition version on January 25, 2008, as a DVD playable on a Microsoft Windows PC. The regular edition followed on February 29, 2008. Kadokawa Shoten had planned on releasing a port for the PlayStation 3 and a spin-off game for the PlayStation Portable, but they later cancelled both games.

== Related media ==
=== Manga ===
The manga adaptation, under the title Fortune Arterial Character's Prelude, was serialized in ASCII Media Works' Dengeki G's Magazine between the September 2007 and April 2008 issues, illustrated by Akane Sasaki. The manga transferred to Dengeki G's Festival! Comic, a special edition version of Dengeki G's Magazine, starting with the second volume sold on April 26, 2008. The first bound volume was released on June 27, 2008, under ASCII Media Works' Dengeki Comics imprint. A second manga, called simply Fortune Arterial, started serialization in the November 2007 issue of Kadokawa Shoten's gaming magazine Comptiq, illustrated by Miki Kodama. The first volume for the second manga was released on July 26, 2008, under Kadokawa Shoten's Kadokawa Comics Ace imprint; the sixth volume was released on February 26, 2011. Enterbrain published ten volumes of a manga anthology titled Magi-Cu 4-koma Fortune Arterial released between April 25, 2008, and February 25, 2010. Ichijinsha published three volumes of another anthology titled Fortune Arterial Comic Anthology between June 25 and October 25, 2008.

=== Books and publications ===
Harvest published a series of six erotic light novels, each focusing on a different heroine, between June 10, 2008, and June 1, 2009. Runa Okada wrote the novels and the game's original artist Bekkankō provided the illustrations. Prior to the game's release, Enterbrain published a fan book on November 21, 2007, titled Tech Gain Super Prelude: Fortune Arterial containing information on the development of the game and information on the game itself. ASCII Media Works published a fan book on June 20, 2008, titled Fortune Arterial Perfect Visual Book.

=== Audio dramas ===
Marine Entertainment released a series of five drama CDs titled Fortune Arterial: Through the Season between August 15 and December 28, 2008. Each of the CDs covered one of the heroines and featured the same voice cast as the game. An Internet radio show titled August Broadcasting Office: Shuchikan Academy Student Council Business Trip had a pre-broadcast on August 13, 2009, and started regular biweekly broadcasts on September 10, 2009. The show is produced by Marine Entertainment and hosted by Junichi Suwabe and Rie Kanda, the voices of Iori and Erika Sendo. The first volume of a CD compilation containing the first six broadcasts was released on December 29, 2009, by Marine Entertainment.

=== Anime ===
A 12-episode anime television series adaptation titled Fortune Arterial: Akai Yakusoku (FORTUNE ARTERIAL 赤い約束, Fortune Arterial: Red Promise) produced by Zexcs and Feel and directed by Munenori Nawa aired on TV Tokyo between October 9 and December 25, 2010, in Japan. The opening theme is "Kizunairo" (絆-kizunairo-色, Color of Bonds) by Lia and the ending theme is "I Miss You" by Veil. An original video animation episode was bundled with the limited sixth volume of Miki Kodama's manga Fortune Arterial.

==== Episode list ====
No.	Title	Original release date
1	"Migratory Bird"; Transliteration: "Wataridori" (Japanese: 渡り鳥)	October 9, 2010
The episode starts with Kohei Hasekura transferring into Shuchikan Academy located on Tamatsu Island due to family reasons. Arriving at school, he meets Sendo Erika, the student council vice-president, but is unable to shake her hand for some unknown reason. She then asks Hachimandaira Tsukasa to guide Kohei to the dorms. At the dorms he meets two of his childhood friends, revealing that he lived for a short time on the island seven years ago. The friends are sisters, the eldest named Kanade Yuki, who is the dorm resident manager, and the younger named Haruna Yuki, who happens to be Kohei's age. While Kohei tries to go to the Student Oversight Building (Pandemonium) he encounters Shiro Togi, who is trying to catch her rabbit (Yukimaru), and Sister Shizuko Amaike. Finally arriving at Student Oversight Building, he meets Shiro's brother, Seichiro Togi, Erika's brother, Iori Sendo (who tells Kohei that Erika loved him at first sight), and Erika herself. Later, Iori tricks Kohei into entering the girl's bath with Erika already bathing. After the ensuing chaos, Kohei knows he had been tricked but still wants to apologize to Erika. At the end of episode, Erika asks Kohei to meet her at the Zelkova tree.
2	"Opening Ceremony"; Transliteration: "Shigyōshiki" (Japanese: 始業式)	October 16, 2010
Kohei arrives to school late and is unable to apologize to Erika. At the entrance ceremony both Iori and Erika are seemingly well liked by the student body, and as part of Erika's speech Kohei is singled out as the man who went into the girl's bath. Finally arriving at class, he meets Kuze Kiriha (who arrives after him). While trying to meet with Erika to apologize, Kohei accidentally runs into Kuze knocking down both boxes of student handbooks she was carrying, and he helps her with the boxes. Back at class Kohei notices that Yukimaru is loose and decides to help look for the rabbit. Kohei again encounters Kuze with her warning against further involvement. When Kohei injures his hand catching Yukimaru Erika finds she still is not able to hold Kohei's hand, and Iori steps in to help and uses his handkerchief on Kohei's wound. Back at dorm, Kohei is finally able to apologize to Erika and they officially become friends. However, back at Pandemonium, Iori is shown a test result of Kohei explaining that Kohei is indeed not normal resulting in Erika's odd behavior when they first met.
3	"The One Thousand Year Spring"; Transliteration: "Sennen Izumi" (Japanese: 千年泉)	October 23, 2010
The episode starts with Haruna, Kanade, and Heiji wanting to have a tea party in Kohei's room also inviting Erika and Shiro. The next day they all go out shopping together. The next day, back in school, Iori reveals, while playing a "serious" board game, that he is indeed a vampire just as Kohei suspected with Erika confessing the same thing. Iori claims he has no intention to suck Kohei's blood and offers Kohei a chance to join Student Council but if Kohei refuses to join Iori will be forced to erase Kohei's memory. Finding some difficulty in refusing, Kohei nonetheless refuses and is willing to start over at the academy. Iori leaves and asks Erika do the "job". Erika, revealing her fangs and vampire power to Kohei, finds herself unable to erase Kohei's memories, with the latter wanting to keep his memories. Later, Kohei agrees to join Student Council.
4	"Newcomer"; Transliteration: "Shin'iri" (Japanese: 新入り)	October 30, 2010
The episode begins with Iori explaining to Kohei the differences between Vampires as seen in movies and Vampires in real life. Later, he puts Kohei in charge of Athletic Meet as the new Student Council Officer. Kohei ends up with a lot of work in order to make the Athletic Meet a success. Haruna, Kanade, and Heiji arrive at evening tea time and encourage Kohei with his efforts. While in an old Library room Kohei and Erika find old pictures of past Athletic Meets. While working hard to complete the flyer, Kohei gets an idea to give our rewards during the competition. With help from Shiro, Kohei is able to get a few shops in the shopping district to donate items for the prizes. Kohei learns from Shiro that the Togi family are kind leaders for the island residents, leading the shops to be happy to donate the prizes. Kohei works until the day before the meet with help from the rest of the students of the committee.
5	"Key"; Transliteration: "Kagi" (Japanese: 鍵)	November 6, 2010
The episode begins with Kohei giving a speech on the Athletic Meet day but does not know how to say it. Everything is going well and everyone is exited. At the final competition, Haruna gets injured while racing and can not run with Kohei. Then Kohei ask Kuze to join him. At the end of episode, Iori gives Kohei the Student Oversight Building's key.
6	"Letter"; Transliteration: "Tegami" (Japanese: 手紙)	November 13, 2010
Haruna seems to have wished for something when she was a little girl. At present time school the event "School Image Month" begins but preparation is completed without anything being said to Kohei even though he wants to help. Meanwhile, Kanade suspects them and thinks Erika may have Kohei-love fever but wonders about Kohei's feelings towards Erika. Haruna has been keeping all the letters that Kohei replied to when he was away. Soon after that, Kanade sneaks to Kohei's room but gets caught. At the "School Image Month" event, Haruna argues with her sister about her memory loss because of a car accident. It's later revealed that lost the memories of her year with Kohei all ended with the letter she sent so Kohei tried to make Haruna happy to make up for it (she thought it was all her fault). However, Haruna do not want that. After they confront each other they able to resolve it (actually, it was a misunderstanding). And it reveal Haruna wish that Kohei came back to island.
7	"Omen"; Transliteration: "Maebure" (Japanese: 前触れ)	November 20, 2010
Someone confesses to Erika but she refuses. Erika's birthday is today. Erika helps Kohei for upcoming swimming pool event then Kohei gives her a present (flowers) which surprises her. At her room, Erika's heart is pounding. At the swimming pool event, Erika gives Kohei a sandwich for lunch and also puts Yakiso on it. As the event ends, Kohei asks Erika to have a swim race and they also nearly end up kissing but then Erika feels her heart pounding again. It is revealed that she wants blood.
8	"Memory"; Transliteration: "Kioku" (Japanese: 記憶)	November 26, 2010
Erika has a dream where she sucks Kohei's blood. There are rumors of a vampire at school, but both Iori and Erika deny it being them. Both Kohei and Erika try to look for that vampire at night when they meet up with Iori and Seichiro. The four of them then see a vampire. It is revealed she is Kuze who is a servant which serves vampires. While they chase Kuze, Erika meets Haruna(in her vampire mode). And it is finally revealed that when the accident happened it was Erika who saved Haruna and erased her memory. Because Haruna saw her in Vampire mode, Iori suggested she should erase her memory like before. But Kohei begs Erika not to do that but Erika refuses meanwhile Haruna awakens and thanks Erika for saving her six year ago. Erika proceeds and instead of erase her memory, she restores them all.
9	"Servant"; Transliteration: "Kenzoku" (Japanese: 眷属)	December 4, 2010
Kuze is shown to be lying on the grass on the cliff. Back at school, Haruna told Kanade everything about what had happened and Kanade thanks Erika. Kuze appears but seems to ignore them as well as Iori and Seichiro. Iori asks both Erika and Kohei in charge of "The culture fair". Back to Kuze, Seichiro meets her and wants her to meet someone. Meanwhile, Erika and Kohei go shopping together and then she tells Kohei about a "servant" which reveals kuze formed a contract with her mother (Kaya Sendo). Erika tells Kohei about the promise she had made with her mother that if she can not find a servant after graduating her mother will drag her back to her estate. Then Kohei offers to be Erika's servant but she refuses because she also just want to be a normal human. Later at night, Erika begins to drink more blood and shows she wants Kohei's blood most.
10	"Thirst"; Transliteration: "Kawaki" (Japanese: 渇き)	December 11, 2010
At Pandemonium, the students submit their application for culture fair event. Later at night, Erika goes to meet her mother and discusses about having servant but Erika keeps refusing not to have servant. After that Erika refuses to drink blood and tries to control it. At the beach Iori tells everything to Kohei. While the class hangs out Erika is no longer able to control her thirst then Kohei gives her his blood.
11	"Parting"; Transliteration: "Ketsubetsu" (Japanese: 訣別)	December 18, 2010
Erika awakens in her room but does not remember what had happened. After meeting Kohei at Pandemonium, she is unable to control her thirst. Kuze comes to her room and reveal that Kohei's blood is special and once she drank it, she is unable to stop. Kuze also warns about her mother (she will try to take Kohei). Erika still does not come out to meet Kohei. However, Shiro offers her blood but she refuses.
12	"Red Promise"; Transliteration: "Akai Yakusoku" (Japanese: 赤い約束)	December 25, 2010
The episode begins with Erika being in prison. Iori tells Kohei that after a vampire draws blood directly from human they will keep desiring blood more and more. Later, Kohei goes to meet Kaya and Sendo to talk about Erika and try to take her back. Erika shows up but Kaya tries to make Kohei be Erika's servant but Erika refuses. Kohei wants Erika back and offers his blood but might or might not become her servant, for it is what they decide between them. The episode ends with the ceremony which everyone enjoys.
OVA	"The Place I Longed to Reach"; Transliteration: "Tadoritsuita Basho" (Japanese: たどり着いた場所)	February 26, 2011
Kohei shows an expression just like at the beginning of episode 1 but is interrupted by his friend. Everyone has vacation as they arrive at cabin they were all surprised because it was huge and everyone will be sleeping together. Yukimaru talks to each other about promise they have made which creates a misunderstanding to Seichiro. After the bath, Kanade asks everyone what is the guy they think of the most and surprisingly answer is Kohei (even Kuze) except for Shiro (she thinks about her brother). Later, they have a tea party together. In the morning, they have the main event "The Great Tennis Match-ups!" and Erika and Kohei win the match. After the match, they have a bath at hot-spring then Iori tricks Kohei again (makes him go to girl's bath). Erika thanks Kohei but then sucks his blood from his finger (he cuts himself while opening a bottle of energy drink).

=== Music ===
The opening theme for the Fortune Arterial visual novel is "Tobira Hiraite, Futari Mirai e" (扉ひらいて、ふたり未来へ, Open the Door, to Our Future) sung by Mizuho. An insert song in the game is "Akai Yakusoku" (赤い約束, Red Promise) sung by Veil. A maxi single containing the opening theme and insert song was released on January 25, 2008. An image song for the game, "It's My Precious Time!", is also sung by Mizuho and a single containing the image song was released on October 25, 2007. August released the game's original soundtrack on May 30, 2008. A character song album titled Fortune Arterial Feeling Assort was released by Geneon on August 14, 2009. Shot Music released a remix album, Fortune Arterial -Omnibus Edit- P-O-P, with remixes of the game's background music and theme songs on January 29, 2010.
