= Gal Guardians: Demon Purge =

- Developer: Inti Creates
- Publisher: Inti Creates
- Director: Kyo Kobayashi
- Producer: Takuya Aizu
- Programmer: Kazuto Kimishima
- Artist: Masanori Itō
- Platforms: Nintendo Switch; PlayStation 4; PlayStation 5; Windows; Xbox One; Xbox Series X/S
- Release: WW: February 23, 2023
- Genre: Platformer
- Modes: Multiplayer, single-player

Gal Guardians: Demon Purge, known as Grim Guardians: Demon Purge in Japan, is a 2023 platform video game developed and published by Inti Creates. It is a spinoff of Gal Gun.

A sequel, Gal Guardians: Servants of the Dark, was released on March 27, 2025.

== Gameplay ==
Two characters from Gal Gun, Shinobu and Maya, become trapped in a castle similar to Castlevania. Players must guide them to freedom by traversing the castle. Gal Guardians: Demon Purge is a side-scrolling platform game. Shinobu is a ranged attacker, and Maya is a melee fighter. If one dies, players can continue playing by having the other reach her. The game is saved at checkpoints. It supports cooperative multiplayer.

Each time the player defeats a boss for the first time, they acquire a new subweapon for both of the sisters. At certain points in the game, the player can also acquire weapon upgrades. Throughout the stages, players encounter various schoolgirls who have been caught within the dimensional merger, whom they can rescue. At a certain point in the game, a base is unlocked, which the player can return to upgrade their subweapons, earn rewards for replaying stages, and engage in conversation with various characters.

The game has two "loops"—the initial, mostly linear loop, and a "second loop", upon which the game becomes significantly less linear.

Upon acquiring their first ending, players unlock extra content when returning to the game, most notably an extended side-quest involving locating and returning lost panties that have been caught in dimensional rifts. Notably, the game's anime-style opening movie (featuring the game's main vocal theme, Never x Never x Never) plays for the first time after the player has initially acquired their first ending, upon which it will thereafter play every time the game is started. This likely was done as the opening contains plot spoilers (such as the presence of Adult Kurona as the game's main threat), as well as potentially to mask the game as a more traditional Castlevania inspired title for first time players.

== Plot ==
Demon-hunting sisters Shinobu and Maya Kamizono are shocked when their ordinary high school is suddenly ripped from the human world, transported to the demon realm, and transformed into a sinister castle. They soon learn this is the work of Kurona, a mischievous student from the Demon Academy, who claims to have gained "unlimited power." Declaring it as her ultimate "prank," Kurona challenges the sisters to confront her on the castle's top floor.

Determined to restore their school and rescue their classmates, Shinobu and Maya begin their ascent. Along the way, they save trapped schoolgirls and battle warped versions of their own friends – Aoi, Akira, Kaname, Nanako, and Chiru – who have been transformed into powerful demonic bosses by the dimensional merger. After fighting their way to the summit and defeating Kurona, their victory is cut short by the sudden appearance of an older, more powerful version of Kurona from the future. This Adult Kurona easily defeats the sisters and sends them back in time, forcing them to relive the entire ordeal from the beginning.

Caught in this time loop, the sisters must navigate the castle once more. During this second journey, they rescue a kind angel named Risu and reconnect with their childhood friend, Houdai, who has mysteriously fused with the castle itself. Establishing a base of operations with Houdai's help, he informs them they must defeat the bosses again to collect five items that would "get any healthy teenage boy fired up" to boost his Pheromone power. This requires them to defeat the bosses of each stage again. After the five "items" have been collected, Houdai is able to detect that the source of Kurona's power is a dimensional mirror that she is keeping hidden in a secret room.

Upon reaching and defeating the younger Kurona again, she reveals the source of the chaos: the Dimensional Mirror. This powerful artifact has created a rift connecting Kurona's present with Adult Kurona's future, facilitating the latter's plan to conquer all realms. Kurona claims the mirror judges entrants based on beauty and chose her for passage.

The game's conclusion hinges on choices made by the player, leading to one of three main endings, although all paths culminate in a final battle within the Dimensional Rift. Before facing Adult Kurona, the sisters must first fight Houdai, now brainwashed into serving as Adult Kurona's devoted, foot-worshipping minion. Defeating Adult Kurona in any ending sends her back to her own time, foiling her plans.

Endings:

- Normal Ending (Default): Shinobu forcefully shatters the Dimensional Mirror to gain entry. After defeating both Houdai, and Adult Kurona's first form, Houdai's attempt to restrain Adult Kurona with a Pheromone Field fails, leaving Shinobu and Maya to defeat her final form on their own. The sisters return home, only to find their school still trapped in the demon realm, much to Shinobu's fury and Kurona's amusement.
- Good Ending (Requires collecting machine parts for Chiru): Chiru builds a device allowing the sisters safe passage through the mirror. During the final battle, Houdai successfully uses the Pheromone Field on Adult Kurona. Their rescued friends (Aoi, Akira, Kaname, Nanako, Chiru, and Risu) arrive, lending their powers and making the final fight significantly easier. The sisters return to a normal school life, though Kurona's antics soon call them back to action.
- Doki Doki Ending (Requires rescuing all schoolgirls): Houdai successfully traps Adult Kurona in the Pheromone Field. The rescued schoolgirls arrive, all confessing their love for the sisters. The final confrontation shifts genre, becoming a Gal Gun-inspired "Doki Doki Mode" sequence where the sisters defeat Adult Kurona by overwhelming her with "ecstasy" using their Pheromone Shots. Back home, the prolonged Pheromone Field effects cause all the rescued girls to become romantically obsessed with the sisters

Additionally, an optional scene can be unlocked by acquiring all subweapon upgrades, showing Shinobu and Maya appeasing the Dimensional Mirror's "interests" by donning bunny girl costumes to pass through.

=== Post-game ===
After acquiring their first ending, upon returning to the game, the player can activate an additional post-game story.

Shinobu and Maya find a pair of panties in the castle. At the gym in the base, they are told by one of the students, Tsubomi Haruno, that the undies are hers. The sisters realise that they've not been wearing any underwear ever since the dimensional merger occurred. Chiru tells them that the dimensional merger caused the underwear of all of the girls to separate and get stuck in dimensional rifts, although it's unclear if it was just a strange coincidence or done intentionally. The Sisters take it upon themselves to hunt down everyone's underwear from the dimensional rifts that are scattered throughout the castle's various levels, before returning them to their rightful owners, including their own.

Upon the success of the undies operation, Tsubomi brands the sisters the "Masters of Undies", much to their shame and embarrassment.

== Development ==
The title was originally Grim Guardians: Demon Purge, but this was changed outside Japan in March 2023 after a dispute over the trademarked term "Grimguard". Inti Creates released the game for Windows, PlayStation 4 and 5, Xbox One and Series X/S, and Switch on February 23, 2023.

== Reception ==
Gal Guardians: Demon Purge received positive reviews on all platforms except for the PlayStation 5, which received mixed reviews. Although Digitally Downloaded said it is not innovative, they said fans of the early Castlevania games would enjoy it, an assessment echoed by Hardcore Gamer. Nintendo Life called it "a solid, playable adventure" and said it is almost, but not quite, as good as Bloodstained: Curse of the Moon. Nintendo World Report praised its retro gameplay, though they said it can feel a bit repetitive by the end.

== Sequel ==
A sequel Servants of the Dark, was announced in September 2024. It released for Microsoft Windows, Nintendo Switch, PlayStation 4, and PlayStation 5 on March 27, 2025 and on June 5, 2025 on Xbox One and Xbox Series X/S. It set to release on Nintendo Switch 2 on January 28, 2027. It received "generally favourable" reception according to Metacritic.
