= Gal Gun: Double Peace =

2015 video game

- Developer: Inti Creates
- Publishers: Alchemist (2015); JP/AS: Inti Creates (2022); NA/EU: PQube (2016; 2022)
- Director: Masanori Ito
- Producers: Takuya Aizu; Yukimasa Tamura; Shigeru Nakagawa
- Artist: Masanori Ito
- Writer: Toshiaki Tai
- Composers: Ryo Kawakami; Ippo Yamada; Luna Umegaki; Tsutomu Kurihara; Hiroaki Sano
- Engine: Unreal Engine 3
- Platforms: PlayStation 4; PlayStation Vita; Microsoft Windows; Nintendo Switch
- Release: PlayStation 4, PlayStation Vita: JP: August 6, 2015; UK: July 22, 2016; NA: August 2, 2016; Microsoft Windows: WW: September 27, 2016; Nintendo Switch: WW: March 17, 2022
- Genre: Rail shooter
- Mode: Single player

Gal Gun: Double Peace (ぎゃる☆がん だぶるぴーす, Gyaru Gan Daburu Pīsu) is a rail shooter bishōjo video game developed by Inti Creates. The game was released on PlayStation 4 and PlayStation Vita in Japan in August 2015, in Europe in July 2016, and in North America in August. It is the sequel to the 2011 game, Gal Gun, and is similar to its predecessor.

The player takes the role of a male student, Houdai Kudoki, who attempts to shoot his female classmates with "Pheromone Shot" while he finds his "True Love" girlfriend.

A Microsoft Windows version of the game was released via Steam on September 27, 2016, and a Nintendo Switch version of the game was released on March 17, 2022.

== Synopsis ==
The game takes place in a fictional academy in Japan, named Sakurachi Academy. A student cupid angel, Ekoro, has to strike a student with a love arrow during her exam, which will help the student find the love of her life. The target is protagonist Houdai Kudoki, an unpopular male student at the academy. However, Ekoro notices that Kurona, a demon angel who is also doing a practical exam, has the same intended target of Houdai. In an effort to strike the target first, Ekoro accidentally increases the dose of the arrow by thirty-two times the original intended amount. This makes every girl at the school grow madly in love with Houdai, frantically running after him in an effort to claim him as their partner. At the same time, the aforementioned demon angel is striking girls with her staff, which makes the girls express their love for Houdai via the act of aggressive "crush bullying". Due to unintended side effect caused by increased dose of the shot, Houdai will face a life alone if he doesn't find his "True Love" girlfriend before the sunset.

The sisters Shinobu and Maya, who are the students at the academy and childhood friends of Houdai are also relevant to the plot. They aren't affected by Houdai's curse due to a hidden profession as demon hunters, the sisters spend the game hunting Kurona, whilst also rekindling a bond with Houdai, whom they have not spoken to in three years.

The game features branching paths and multiple endings.

== Gameplay ==
Gal Gun: Double Peace is a rail shooter bishōjo game. The player fends off waves of female classmates using the pheromone shot, a power granted to the protagonist Houdai via the cupid Ekoro. If the player shoots the girl, the pheromone shot will give them euphoria, subduing them in the process, thus preventing them from confessing their love feelings to the player that will damage player's HP if they succeed. The player may use the analog stick to shoot the classmates. Unlike the original, the PlayStation Move is not supported in the home console version.

Specific sections will also require the use of touch or swipes. This is done via the PlayStation 4's touchpad on the controller, or the screen on the Vita. "Doki-Doki Mode" makes a return, effectively breaking up the gameplay and preventing tedium. Kurona's cursed girls are more difficult to subdue, requiring the player to first shoot a mini demon angel that hovers around the infected girl before the female student may be shot with a pheromone shot. Holding the right shoulder button allows the players reticule to be zoomed in, with the left shoulder button serving as a method of slowing the sights down. Both of these serve as a mean of gaining the player a more accurate shot. Zooming in also allows the player to see through invisible walls. Items such as character profiles, cosmetics or other school girls to subdue can be found behind certain hidden walls, as well as decreased cover for female students to hide behind.

The academy shop is open to the player. It is run by Aoi, a female musician at the school who isn't affected by Houdai's cupid condition. Items here can be purchased, including increased player stats, more powerful shots and new camera angels for Doki-Doki mode. Donations can also be made to Aoi, which will unlocking her secret ending if enough are made. All currency is gained by completing levels or specific requests from other students. These requests can be viewed in between levels, and are usually completed by collecting a certain hidden item within a stage.

The title features branching paths and dialogue trees. The differing routes allows the player to select what stage they'd like to play from an ordered list (in order to play stages the player passed on, a new game must be started) whilst the dialogue ranges from statements of love to perverted remarks, and these all allow the player to either straighten a girl's affection for Houdai or dwindle it, depending on her tastes and what is said.

There are over seventy girls in the game, all of which contain specific endings. If shot, they can be interacted with, and the player may experiment to see if they are his destined lover. Like the first, Double Peace features a "Mom’s Arrived Screen". Activating this will make the game have the layout and aesthetics of an RPG. This is reserved for when someone walks into the room, and the player feels the need to hide the subject matter of the game. This is exclusive to the PC and PlayStation 4 version of the game.

== Release ==
Gal Gun: Double Peace was released on PlayStation 4 and PlayStation Vita in Japan on August 6, 2015, by publisher Alchemist. An international release of these versions was carried out by the publisher PQube. The company promised the game would be uncensored from the original Japanese product, remaining completely intact, a rarity for a game of this subject matter. The game was widely available in various chains throughout Europe, but North America saw a limited release, exclusive to VGP.ca for Canada and Amazon.com for the United States. Rice Digital primarily handled the British sale, offering both a standard edition and a collectors edition, titled the Mr Happiness edition. This set includes a wall scroll, artbook, soundtrack, bonus downloadable content, and a screen cleaner in the shape of female undergarments. Rice also offered the North American version of the game. Conversely, the Canadian distribution was handled by Video Games Plus. VGP offered standard copies as well as an exclusive edition of their own, dubbed the 'launch edition'. This included a copy of the game alongside an artbook. Amazon only sold the standard editions.

For 2016, the English version of the game was originally to be released on July 15 in Europe and 19 in North America, but were delayed to July 29 and August 2, respectively, due to "manufacturing delays"; PQube later moved the European release date to July 22.

On July 27, EB Games, who had exclusive rights to distribute the game in Australia, started pulling copies from stores, as well as Senran Kagura: Estival Versus, leaving Australians with only the options of importing or downloading it via PlayStation Store.

The North American Vita version garnered some attention around release due to a misprint on the game box. The game, rated 'M' for Mature (17+) by the ESRB was incorrectly labeled on the back as 'E' for Everyone (6+), but with the correct description of "sexual content". Due to the game's exclusivity to online retailers in the region, the title was not recalled. A similar occurrence happened years earlier when Atelier Meruru: The Apprentice of Arland was first released in Japan with an A (All Ages) rating, which would then later be revoked and would be given a B (Ages 12+) rating in the re-release from CERO instead.

A Microsoft Windows port was released via Steam on September 27, 2016.

A Nintendo Switch port was released on March 17, 2022. It was also stated to include DLCS and a new opening cinematic on the back of physical copies of Gal*Gun Double Peace.

== Reception ==
Reception

Aggregate score
Aggregator	Score
Metacritic	PS4: 64/100; NS: 66/100

Review scores
Publication	Score
4Players	50/100
Destructoid	7.5/10
Famitsu	8/10, 8/10, 8/10, 7/10
GameRevolution	8/10
Hardcore Gamer	4/5
MeriStation	7.6/10
Nintendo Life	6/10
Push Square	3/10
TouchArcade	3/5

Gal Gun: Double Peace received "mixed or average" reviews from critics, according to review aggregator Metacritic. The title fared far better in Japan, with Famitsu reviewers awarding both versions of the game a 31/40, recording scores of 8/8/8/7 from the four respective critics.

Jed Whitaker of GameRevolution gave the game a positive review, applauding the branching paths and magnitude of content to unlock, while also praising the replay value and ability of seeing through objects, saying it added depth. Despite this, he complained of the faulty touch controls and sexualization of underage girls. Ultimately though, Whitaker gave the game an 8/10: "I kind of love Gal-Gun: Double Peace not only for daring to be as stupid and perverse as it is with no excuses, but also for being one of the most content-rich and replayable games in its genre. If you can overlook (or enjoy) the cringeworthy perverseness found here, you'll find an enjoyable little shooter".

CJ Andriessen of Destructoid awarded both the PlayStation 4 and Vita versions a 7.5/10. Andriessen enjoyed the replay value within a game of multiple endings, collectibles and differing scenarios depending on which path the player selected, as well as the variety within the different arcs. However, he took issue with the short length of the game, as well as other minor faults throughout the title. Overall though, Andriessen cited the experience of playing it as enjoyable.

Sammy Barker of Push Square gave the game a negative review. Barker cited the sluggish reticule and faulty touch controls as frustrating. He also complained of the performance on the Vita, while also criticizing the game's graphics, saying it looks over a decade old. Barker did conversely like the multitude of different girls in the game, and the fact they each have a unique voice. He would go on to give the game a 3/10, closing out his review with "shameless like a boob tube but about a billion times less interesting, Gal*Gun: Double Peace is a bad rails-shooter that tries tirelessly to get a raise, only to leave you feeling limp and agitated".

=== New Zealand ban ===
The game was deemed objectionable and banned in New Zealand by the OFLC, due to its "sexualization of underage schoolgirls and low difficulty, making the game purely for titillation".
