= Rie Kanda =

Japanese voice actress

Rie Kanda (神田 理江, Kanda Rie; born June 16, 1978 in Tokyo, Japan) is a Japanese voice actress affiliated with 81 Produce.

Kanda is also known under the names Asamiya Saki, Saitou Aiko, Saeki Ami, Suzuki Mari, Tokiwa Misaki, Mimura Sakiko and Mimura Shoko.

== Filmography ==
=== Anime ===
- Fortune Arterial (Sendō Erika) (2010)

Unknown date

- Ah! My Goddess (Tennis club member) (Ep. 1) (1993)
- Demonbane (Al-Azif, Etheldreda) (2006)
- Figure 17 (Minoru Kaneko) (2005-2006)
- Gakuen Alice (Anna, Kawako Usami) (Eps. 3 and 5) (2004)
- Gravitation (Woman) (Ep. 1) (2000)
- Gunparade Orchestra (Natsuko Saitou) (2005-2006)
- Hanaukyo Maid Tai (Maid 1) (Ep. 5) (2004)
- Madlax (Female Student B) (Ep. 2) (2004)
- PaRappa the Rapper (Gallery, Mother) (Eps. 17 and 25) (2002)
- Shrine of the Morning Mist (Izumi Sakibara) (2002)
- Tsubasa: Reservoir Chronicle (Information Desk Attendant) (2005-2006)
- Tsuki wa Higashi ni Hi wa Nishi ni: Operation Sanctuary (Honami Fujieda) (2004)
- Yami to Bōshi to Hon no Tabibito (Seiren) (2003)

=== Games ===
- Atelier Iris: Eternal Mana (Popo) (2004)

Unknown date

- Atelier Iris 2: The Azoth of Destiny (Poe, Dour) (xxxx)
- Atelier Judie ~The Alchemist of Gramnad~ (Judith Volltone) (xxxx)
- Demonbane (Al Azif, Etheldreda) (2006)
- Ever 17 (Additional Voices) (xxxx)
- Final Fantasy Tactics Advance (Shara) (xxxx)
- Heart de Roommate (Asumi Hirota) (xxxx)
- Growlanser V (Vanette) (xxxx)
- Shadow Hearts: From the New World (Hildegard Valentine) (xxxx)
- Super Robot Wars UX (Al Azif) (xxxx)
- Tsuki wa Higashi ni Hi wa Nishi ni: Operation Sanctuary (Honami Fujieda) (xxxx)

=== Drama CDs ===
- Mix Mix Chocolate (Schoolgirl 2)
