= The Sacred Blacksmith =

Japanese light novel series

- The cover of the first light novel featuring Cecily Campbell

聖剣の刀鍛冶（ブラックスミス） (Seiken no Burakkusumisu)
- Genre: Epic fantasy; Sword and sorcery
- Light novel
- Written by: Isao Miura
- Illustrated by: Luna
- Published by: Media Factory
- Imprint: MF Bunko J
- Original run: November 22, 2007 – August 23, 2013
- Volumes: 16
- Manga
- Written by: Isao Miura
- Illustrated by: Kōtarō Yamada
- Published by: Media Factory
- English publisher: NA: Seven Seas Entertainment
- Magazine: Monthly Comic Alive
- Original run: March 27, 2009 – January 27, 2017
- Volumes: 10
- Anime television series
- Directed by: Masamitsu Hidaka
- Produced by: Hiromasa Minami; Hiroshi Kudo; Kazuya Takahashi; Masazumi Katō; Shōji Hirako; Takashi Kochiyama
- Written by: Masashi Suzuki
- Music by: Tamiya Terashima
- Studio: Manglobe
- Licensed by: AUS: Madman Entertainment; NA: Funimation Entertainment; UK: Manga Entertainment
- Original network: AT-X, CTC, tvk, TV Saitama, CTV, Tokyo MX, Sun TV
- English network: US: Funimation Channel
- Original run: October 3, 2009 – December 19, 2009
- Episodes: 12

The Sacred Blacksmith (Japanese: 聖剣の刀鍛冶(ブラックスミス), Hepburn: Seiken no Burakkusumisu; lit. "The Sacred Sword Blacksmith"), is a Japanese light novel series by Isao Miura, with illustrations by Luna. 16 volumes were published by Media Factory under their MF Bunko J label from November 2007 to August 2013. A manga adaptation by Kōtarō Yamada was serialised in the seinen manga magazine Monthly Comic Alive from March 2009 to January 2017 and compiled into ten tankōbon volumes. A 12 episode anime adaptation by Manglobe studios aired from October to December 2009.

== Plot ==
Forty-four years ago, a great war known as the Valbanill War ravaged the land. One of the war's most dangerous weapons was the Demon Contract, where humans sacrifice their bodies to become powerful demons. Realizing the damage the contracts have caused the land, the surviving nations made peace and banned the use of the Demon contracts.

Cecily Campbell is a 3rd generation Knight from Housman, one of the cities of the Independent Trade Cities, a democratic federation of cities. As her grandfather was one of the founders of the Independent Trade Cities, she is proud of her heritage and wishes to protect her city as a knight, like her father and grandfather before her. One day, she fights a mad veteran of the war causing trouble in the market, and, inexperienced and outmatched, faces defeat. But she is saved by a mysterious blacksmith named Luke Ainsworth. Cecily is impressed by Luke's katana, a weapon she has never seen before, and asks him to make one for her. Her involvement with Luke will bring her to an adventure she never expected.

== Characters ==
=== Protagonists ===
Cecily Campbell (セシリー・キャンベル, Seshirī Kyanberu)
Voiced by: Ayumi Fujimura (Japanese); Cherami Leigh (English)
A 3rd generation knight from The Knight Guards of Housman, the Third City of the Independent Trade Cities. Her grandfather, a former nobleman who became a knight, was one of the founders of the Independent Trade Cities during the Valbanill War. After the war ended, the Campbell family served as knights protecting the city's independence. When her father died of an illness, Cecily took up the role of the head of house, and thus became a knight. She believes strongly in justice and the protection of the city and its citizens, so much that she hesitated to kill a possessed citizen attacking the city. Cecily is a strong, smart girl with great leadership skills, evident early when she leads a group of knights and mercenaries against a band of thieves and monsters.
Luke Ainsworth (ルーク・エインズワース, Rūku Einzuwāsu)
Voiced by: Nobuhiko Okamoto (Japanese); Blake Shepard (English)
A blacksmith of great skill and renown and is also a talented swordsman. Possessing dark brown hair and blue eyes with his left eye made of glass (his real eye was used to create Lisa), he is arrogant, private and often insensitive to others. He lives with Lisa, who aids him in his work and often accompanies him on his business. He comes to know Cecily after saving her repeatedly from certain death. Luke wields a Japanese katana and employs a unique sword-fighting style, which is uncommon in a land where most people use a longsword and shield. He also possesses extraordinary blacksmith skills, aided by Lisa's magical powers.
Although Luke often criticizes Cecily for her inadequacies, he has slowly come to accept her. Her will to protect the city and all its citizens reminds him of Lisa Oakwood, the love of his youth. After his encounters with Cecily, Luke has also come to appreciate Lisa. He becomes increasingly worried that Lisa is living a lifestyle that he has forced upon her. After his confrontation with Lisa about her true feelings, he confesses his regret in forcing the burden of his past onto her and wishes for her to walk her own path. At the end, Luke promises that they will be together forever. Eventually, Luke falls in love with Cecily. At the end of the novels, the two marry, and have two children.
Lisa (リサ, Risa)
Voiced by: Aki Toyosaki (Japanese); Monica Rial (English)
A little girl who is a live-in assistant to Luke. Lisa is actually a demon born from Lisa Oakwood, Luke's childhood best friend. Although unconfirmed, it is suggested that in order to protect Luke forever, Lisa Oakwood made a Demonic Pact before being killed by Valbanill and sacrificed herself to create Lisa.
Lisa greatly resembles Lisa Oakwood when she was young, possessing similar traits, including blonde hair, purple eyes, and elven ears. She has a sweet personality and is very polite. Lisa is also able to create a large magical fireball that enables Luke to forge katanas in the heat of battle. Lisa loves Luke and her life revolves entirely around him. She has proven herself very capable of household chores and takes delight in doing them. In addition, Lisa assists Luke in the forge. When confronted by Luke about her true feelings, Lisa reveals that while she is very happy being with Luke, it also pains her because she is only a "duplicate". She shoulders the burden of Luke's past and knows that her existence reminds Luke of it. However, Lisa confesses that her one wish in life is to remain by Luke's side forever. Three hundred years after Valbanill is sealed away, Lisa is still alive and unchanged in appearance. She is the teacher of Luke and Cecily's descendants whom she has watched over for three centuries and makes the sacred sword that finally frees Aria.
Aria (アリア)
Voiced by: Megumi Toyoguchi (Japanese); Anastasia Muñoz (English)
The demon sword of wind. Aria is special in that she can transform into a human. In her human form, she is beautiful, light-hearted, romantic and very feminine. Her exact age is unknown but she has memories reaching back to the Valbanill War where she was born of a demon contract on the battlefield. Her past is filled with murder and carnage and Aria has come to accept that such is her fate as a demon sword. However, after meeting Cecily, she has learned that there are those who wield swords not for the purpose of killing but protecting. Because of this, she has become incredibly fascinated with Cecily and the two form a powerful bond which enables them to become stronger. As a demon sword, Aria is able to sense other demon swords. Throughout her stay with Cecily, she meets other demon swords like herself, which prompts her curiosity. She is particularly interested in how she was born and how she is able to take a human form. Her transformation into a sword is invoked with the chant: "I call on the powers that be. reveal the truth within. Awaken the power of wind. Awaken and slay god" (眠りを解け。真実を掴め。風をこの手に。-神を殺せ). At the end of the novels, Aria is revealed to be the sacred sword needed to seal Valbanill away. She sacrifices herself, but Cecily promises to make a sacred sword to replace her so that she can be free. After 300 years, Luke and Cecily's descendants and Lisa, their teacher and guardian, free Aria by creating a new sacred sword to be used in her place.

=== Supporting characters ===
Hannibal Quasar (ハンニバル・クェイサー, Hannibaru Kueisā)
Voiced by: Yōsuke Akimoto (Japanese); Mark Stoddard (English)
Leader of the Knight Guards of Housman and veteran of the Valbanill War.
Hugo Housman (ヒューゴー・ハウスマン, Hyūgō Hausuman)
Voiced by: Kazuhiko Inoue (Japanese); Christopher Bevins (English)
Mayor of the City of Housman.
Justina Albright (ジャスティーナ・オルブライト, Jasutīna Oruburaito)
Voiced by: Kikuko Inoue (Japanese); Cynthia Cranz (English)
Patty Baldwin (パティ・ボルドウィン, Pati Barudowin)
Voiced by: Michiru Yuimoto (Japanese); Kara Edwards (English)
Cecily's friend who works for the city. At the end of the novels, she marries Reginald.
Reginald Drummond (レジナルド・ドラモンド, Rejinarudo Doramondo)
Voiced by: Hideki Tasaka (Japanese); Chris Cason (English)
A powerful and aggressive knight of Housman that initially looks down on Cecily. However, after witnessing her fight against a monster, he starts to respect her more as a knight. He wields a zweihander (a two-handed sword or greatsword). At the end of the novels, he marries Patty.
Charlotte E. Firobisher (シャーロット・フィーロビッシャー, Shārotto Fīrobisshā)
Voiced by: Kaori Fukuhara (Japanese); Alexis Tipton (English)
A young girl from the Empire who is an illegitimate daughter of the Emperor. As proof, she has an "E" as her middle name, which is an indication of the royal family. Initially portrayed as a spoiled and selfish girl, she is, in fact, very down to Earth, and can cook and do many household chores despite her supposed status. She struggles internally to fulfill her mother's dying wish: to be recognized as a legitimate child of the Emperor. However, when the Empire refuses to recognize her and brands her as an impostor, she is forced into the tough decision of having to face the death penalty or defect to an opposing nation. Cecily convinces her to renounce her royal status then she, along with her bodyguards, defects to the Military Nation.
Doris (ドリス, Dorisu)
Voiced by: Miyuki Sawashiro (Japanese); Maxey Whitehead (English)
One of Charlotte's companions. She wields Claymore, the Demon Sword of Earth.
Margot (マーゴット, Māgotto)
Voiced by: Minori Chihara (Japanese); Trina Nishimura (English)
One of Charlotte's companions. She wields Rhomphaia, the Demon Sword of Scarlet Light.
Penelope (ペネロペ, Penerope)
Voiced by: Mikako Takahashi (Japanese); Jamie Marchi (English)
One of Charlotte's companions. She wields a ballock knife, the Demon Sword Assassin.
Lisa Oakwood (リーザ・オークウッド, Rīza Ōkuuddo)
Voiced by: Hinako Sasaki (Japanese); Monica Rial (English)
Luke's childhood friend who wanted to be a knight and protect everyone in the city. Unfortunately, she died trying to protect Luke from Valbanill. While it has not been confirmed, Cecily believes that Lisa Oakwood created the demon Lisa to stay by Luke's side forever in her place.
Fio Atkins (フィオ・アトキンス, Fio Atokinsu)
Voiced by: Nozomi Masu (Japanese); Leah Clark (English)
The maid who serves the Campbell Family. She is very strong within the domestic sphere and is able to physically overpower anyone who interferes with her duties as she perceives them. She is very loyal towards the Campbell Family and reacts strongly to anyone speaking ill of the family.
Lucy Campbell (ルーシー・キャンベル, Rūshī Kyanberu)
Voiced by: Ai Orikasa (Japanese); Lydia Mackay (English)
Cecily's mother. She is a calm and gentle woman. She wishes that Cecily would be more feminine. She acts as a mother figure to Charlotte while she and her bodyguards stay in the Campbell house.

=== Antagonists ===
Siegfried (シーグフリード, Shīgufurīdo)
Voiced by: Ryōtarō Okiayu (Japanese); J. Michael Tatum (English)
A recently promoted commander from the Empire. He is actually the cloaked figure who is the source of most of the conflict in the series. He wields the Demon Sword of Corruption.
Jack Strader (ジャック・ストラダー, Jakku Sutoradā)
Voiced by: Kiyoyuki Yanada (Japanese); R Bruce Elliott (English)
The mad veteran Cecily was fighting earlier in the marketplace, who then makes cameo appearances until Episode 4.
Augustus Arthur (オーガスタス・アーサー, Ōgasutasu Āsā)
Voiced by: Hōchū Ōtsuka (Japanese); Kenny Green (English)
Francisca (フランシスカ, Franshisuka)
Voiced by: Masumi Asano (Japanese); Colleen Clinkenbeard (English)
Siegfried's bodyguard and personal attendant.
Evadne (エヴァドニ, Evadoni)
Voiced by: Satsuki Yukino (Japanese); Clarine Harp (English)
A Demon Sword of the Black Flame, who, like Aria, can take human form. In her human form, she is morose and taciturn. She was in Charlotte's possession but may have come from Siegfried. She transforms into a sword by chanting "Shake off your slumber, cloak yourself in darkness, bring yourself the end and kill God" (眠りを解け。闇をまとえ。結末をあなたに。-神を殺せ).
Old Knight (老騎士)
Voiced by: Tomohisa Asō (Japanese); Cole Brown (English)
The wielder of Elsa, the Demon Sword of Thunder. A veteran of the Valbanill War, he lost his daughter after the war when a demon attacked his home. His sanity now gone, he lives for only one thing, to get revenge on Valbanill. He comes to Luke's home seeking vengeance.
Elsa (エルザ, Eruza)
Voiced by: Ryoko Shintani (Japanese); Brina Palencia (English)
A Demon Sword of Thunder who can shape-shift to human form. In her human form, she is a quiet, sad girl. Elsa was born from the rage of the Old Knight when his daughter was slain. She has the same name as his daughter.
After his defeat, she slays him with a misericorde, fulfilling the promise made by his real daughter and dying herself from the wounds she received fighting Cecily and Aria. She transforms into a sword by chanting "Shake off your slumber. The time is at hand. By the judgement of thunder, kill God" (眠りを解け。時は来たれり。雷の裁きを。-神を殺せ).

== Media ==
=== Light novels ===
No.	Release date	ISBN
1	November 22, 2007	978-4-8401-2083-8
2	May 25, 2008	978-4-8401-2141-5
3	September 25, 2008	978-4-8401-2423-2
4	January 23, 2009	978-4-8401-2602-1
5	March 25, 2009	978-4-8401-2723-3
6	June 25, 2009	978-4-8401-2802-5
7	September 25, 2009	978-4-8401-3028-8
8	January 25, 2010	978-4-8401-3157-5
9	May 25, 2010	978-4-8401-3283-1
10	November 25, 2010	978-4-8401-3487-3
11	November 25, 2011	978-4-8401-3931-1
12	March 23, 2012	978-4-8401-4534-3
13	July 25, 2012	978-4-8401-4646-3
14	November 22, 2012	978-4-8401-4903-7
15	March 25, 2013	978-4-8401-5133-7
16	August 23, 2013	978-4-8401-5253-2

=== Manga ===
The manga was announced simultaneously with the anime adaptation, on the wraparound jacket of the fourth light novel volume. Artist Kōtarō Yamada launched the series in Media Factory's Monthly Comic Alive magazine on March 27, 2009. The ninth volume announced in February 2015 that the series would end in its tenth volume, and the last chapter was published in the magazine's March issue on January 27, 2017.

Tokyopop announced their license to the series in November 2010, with the first volume scheduled for June 7, 2011. However, the publisher shut down on May 31, 2011, with all of its titles reverting to their original owners. The series was licensed by Seven Seas Entertainment in October 2012.

No.	Original release date	Original ISBN	English release date	English ISBN
1	June 23, 2009	978-4-8401-2582-6	May 21, 2013	978-1-937867-32-4
2	October 23, 2009	978-4-8401-2928-2	August 6, 2013	978-1-937867-65-2
3	March 23, 2010	978-4-8401-3304-3	December 3, 2013	978-1-937867-83-6
4	September 22, 2010	978-4-8401-3375-3	March 4, 2014	978-1-62692-008-8
5	March 23, 2011	978-4-8401-3769-0	July 1, 2014	978-1-62692-040-8
6	November 22, 2011	978-4-8401-4062-1	November 4, 2014	978-1-62692-086-6
7	August 23, 2012	978-4-8401-4710-1	March 3, 2015	978-1-62692-121-4
8	August 23, 2013	978-4-8401-5303-4	July 14, 2015	978-1-62692-162-7
9	February 23, 2015	978-4-0406-7258-8	November 24, 2015	978-1-62692-214-3
10	February 23, 2017	978-4-0406-9042-1	July 11, 2017	978-1-62692-273-0

=== Anime ===
An anime adaptation was announced on the wraparound jacket for the fourth light novel volume. The series was directed by Masamitsu Hidaka and written by Masashi Suzuki, with animation by the studio Manglobe. The series character designs were provided by Jun Nakai. The opening theme is "Justice of Light" by Mayumi Gojo while the ending theme is "Miracle Happy Day" (みらくるハッピーディ) by Aki Toyosaki. The series aired from October 3, 2009 to December 19, 2009.

The series was licensed by Madman Entertainment in Australia and New Zealand, Manga Entertainment in the United Kingdom, and Funimation in North America. Funimation later announced that it would release the series uncut on DVD after streaming the edited version online. The series was one of the first of Funimations's relaunched collector's edition line of series, receiving a limited edition containing an art booklet. It was broadcast on the Funimation Channel starting on August 8, 2011.

No.	Title	Original release date	English air date
1	"Knight"; Transliteration: "Kishi – Knight" (Japanese: 騎士 – Knight)	October 3, 2009	August 8, 2011
After confronting a citizen who was haggling at a tamahagane merchant, Cecily Campbell, a member of the Knight Guards of Housman, attempts to stop Jack Strader, a mentally unhinged war veteran, from attacking civilians. After her sword is busted in the fight, she is saved by Luke Ainsworth, a skilled blacksmith wielding an unusual curved sword called a katana. Before she can thank him, he insults her skills as a knight and leaves. Cecily learns the advanced skills necessary to repair her sword have dwindled among the cities blacksmiths in favour of cheaper mass production techniques, so she becomes determined to have Luke forge her the katana he uses. At Luke's home where he lives with his friend and assistant, Lisa, Luke refuses her request, stating he only forges those katana for his own personal use. A nearby group of soldiers are attacked by monsters being controlled by a man in a black cloak who wants the treasure they are guarding. Luke easily slays the monsters with his katana, whilst also saving Cecily again, so the cloaked man transforms one of his allies into a demon who destroys Luke's Katana. While Cecily distracts the demon Luke and Lisa use magic to forge a new magical katana in mere seconds.
2	"Devil's Contract – Valbanill"; Transliteration: "Akuma Keiyaku – Valbanill" (Japanese: 悪魔契約 – Valbanill)	October 10, 2009	August 15, 2011
Luke destroys the demon but Cecily is surprised when his new sword simply crumbles away, as his katana forged by magic are more fragile than his real ones. The damage from the battle suddenly catches up to Cecily when her armour falls off, exposing her breasts, so she beats Luke in a fit of rage. The next day Luke uses his bruised appearance as an excuse to skip a meeting with several foreign diplomats about the demon Valbanill who was sealed away by a sacred sword but may soon wake up. It is decided that Luke will forge a new sacred sword. Cecily's commander, Hannibal Quasar, interrogates a bandit who claims the cloaked man can forge demon contracts and turn men into demons. The bandit is killed by a demon inside his body to keep him from talking. Hannibal finds out the soldiers guarding the treasure were a ruse and the treasure was secretly allowed to enter the city by herself. Luke finally agrees to forge Cecily a katana, but only if she can pay the enormous fee for materials and the lengthy forging process, which she can't. Cecily is given a mission from Hannibal to guard a young woman named Aria.
3	"Demon Sword"; Transliteration: "Maken – Sword" (Japanese: 魔剣 – Sword)	October 17, 2009	August 22, 2011
Cecily is told that Aria is actually a powerful weapon called a Demon Sword that can take human form. At Luke's request Aria transforms into a sword which Cecily demonstrates can form blades made from wind. Hannibal plans to use Aria as bait to capture whoever tried to steal her. In the city's prison many prisoners infected by demon parasites escape. Cecily obtains a new sword from the armoury that has one sharp edge and one blunt edge, intending to use it to practice for when she eventually gets a katana from Luke. Reginald, another knight, mocks her for bothering to carry a sword when she is too afraid to kill in battle. The prisoners attack the town on the orders of the cloaked man. Cecily joins the fighting, but having never killed someone before, is overcome by fear and is unable to kill her opponent. Reginald kills the man instead and accuses Cecily of cowardice in front of the other knights. Aria praises Cecily for preferring to preserve life. Elsewhere, Jack Strader, who forged a demon pact years ago to save his own life during the war, is offered a chance to redeem himself by the cloaked man.
4	"Pledge"; Transliteration: "Seiyaku – Promise" (Japanese: 誓約 – Promise)	October 24, 2009	August 29, 2011
In the morning, Cecily is using her new practice sword to train while Aria watches her. Aria expresses interest in Cecily becoming her next master, but Cecily rejects this, opting to become her friend instead. Hannibal reveals that the Demon Sword auction might be a ploy to bait Siegfried, known to Cecily as "the man in the black". Cecily performs the auction with Aria, until the participants' applause is cut off when Jack appears in the middle and sets the place on fire. Luke, Cecily and Aria manage to defeat Jack and attempt to save the people. Thereafter, Aria pledges to become Cecily's partner as a sword meant to protect the people.
5	"Ties – Together"; Transliteration: "Kizuna – Together" (Japanese: 絆 – Together)	October 31, 2009	September 5, 2011
Aria and Cecily are sitting together at Luke's shop while Lisa is supporting Luke with daily chores. Cecily finds that Lisa only has another identical set of clothes to the one she is wearing, and asks Luke to let Lisa go with her and Aria to the marketplace. They manage to pick a new dress for Lisa, and Cecily convinces Luke to show his compassion for Lisa. On their way back home, Lisa asks if Luke finds her new dress to his liking, but Luke says nothing, making her sad. He then gives her a hat he said he picked up and is glad it matches. Lisa is touched he got her something.
6	"Princess"; Transliteration: "Kōjo – Princess" (Japanese: 皇女 – Princess)	November 7, 2009	September 12, 2011
Cecily and Aria are attacked by a young woman called Doris who is a bodyguard to Princess Charlotte E. Firobisher. Cecily has a tough time fighting and loses her sword. Aria asks to fight with her, and she eventually agrees, but during the fight, they discover Doris has been using the Demon Sword of Earth, Claymore, all this time. Doris is accompanied by 2 other guards: Margot, who has the Demon Sword of Scarlet Ray, Rhompair, and Penelope, who wields the Demon Sword that Slays Demon Swords, Ballock knife. Each take turns attacking Cecily, who manages to stand her ground with Aria's powers. Meanwhile, Princess Charlotte herself confronts Luke and tries to force him to come with her using the Demon Sword of Black Flames, Evadne. However, it soon becomes clear that these women are not the murderous thieves and kidnappers they first appear to be.
7	"Family"; Transliteration: "Kazoku – Family" (Japanese: 家族 – Family)	November 14, 2009	September 19, 2011
Charlotte and the others are forced to work as maids in exchange for staying in the Campbell house and, unfortunately for Cecily, she is dragged in as well. However, whilst living and working together, they begin to learn more about each other. Meanwhile Aria talks to Evadne about what it means to be a demon sword.
8	"Departure – Resolution"; Transliteration: "Shuttatsu – Resolution" (Japanese: 出立 – Resolution)	November 21, 2009	September 26, 2011
When the Empire refuses to accept Charlotte's status, they also demand that she and her bodyguards be arrested and extridited, along with the return of the 4 demon swords. The mayor offers her negotiated refuge in a neighboring garrison state, provided she divulges what she knows about the empire. Refusing this rejection by the empire, Charlotte wonders if she can make another plea in person, and her bodyguards plan to steal back the 4 demon swords and capture Luke and Aria to bring to him as gifts in exchange for legitimacy. Cecily, wielding Aria, fights off the bodyguards with their demon swords, and eventually makes the princess see what is truly important before all 4 defect to the garrison state.
9	"Remnants – Lisa"; Transliteration: "Omokage – Lisa" (Japanese: 面影 – Lisa)	November 28, 2009	October 3, 2011
Luke is off to visit the grave of an old friend, Lisa Oakwood, with Cecily. He tells the story of what happened with the demon Valbanil. Meanwhile, Lisa is left to repair a dagger for a customer named Elsa, who is not as she seems. Multiple attacks against the weapon shop follow to reveal the shocking intended target at the end.
10	"Victim of Love – Tragedy"; Transliteration: "Junjō – Tragedy" (Japanese: 殉情 – Tragedy)	December 5, 2009	October 10, 2011
The Man in Black attacks again alongside the old soldier and Elise. Aria learns why demon swords exist.
11	"Truth"; Transliteration: "Shinjitsu – Truth" (Japanese: 真実 – Truth)	December 12, 2009	October 17, 2011
Lisa and Luke's backstory is fleshed out, revealing that Luke's memory of the situation in the cave was hazy and Lisa being created from a demon contract. Sigfried gets fed up with the independent city and gathers followers to attack.
12	"Blacksmith"; Transliteration: "Katanakaji – Blacksmith" (Japanese: 刀鍛冶 – Blacksmith)	December 19, 2009	October 24, 2011
Sigfried's demon attack lays waste to the city and its defenders valiantly try to protect it. Cecily and Aria fight off Sigfried's assistant who was sent to attack them and end the defense. Luke goes to face off against Sigfried, only for his sword to break due to contact with the demon sword of darkness corroding it. After defeating the assistant, Aria is worn out, but Cecily and Lisa go to support Luke, arriving just as Luke's sword breaks and is wounded. He and Lisa forge a new katana for Cecily, but she has to fight Sigfried due to Luke's injury. While it cost her the blade, she defeats Sigfried and breaks his demon sword, but Sigfried escapes.

== Reception ==
The light novels have sold over 780,000 copies. Chris Schmitt wrote "Sacred Blacksmith has a very odd take on the fantasy genre, mixing moe character designs similar to K-On! with some deep, and sometimes dark, fantasy elements."

Theron Martin of Anime News Network gave the anime series a B concluding, "Although The Sacred Blacksmith stumbles in places and fails to fully develop its setting or carry through on the plot threads it establishes, it nonetheless achieves an occasional and undeniable level of sincerity in its characters' convictions and interactions and at least partly delivers on its potential. It may be far from the elite fantasy titles out there, but even within its genre you could certainly do far worse for a pleasing diversion."
