= Go Go Burunyanman =

- Box art of the Ecstasy version
- Genres: Shoot 'em up, Eroge
- Developer: DigitalCute
- Publishers: JP: DigitalCute (PC); JP: Alchemist (PSP)
- Platforms: Microsoft Windows; PlayStation Portable
- First release: Go Go Burunyanman; December 19, 2008
- Latest release: Go Go Burunyanman Ecstasy!! June 27, 2014.

Go Go Burunyan-man (それゆけ！ぶるにゃんマン, Soreyuke! Burunyan-man) is a series of Japanese horizontal shoot'em up video games originally developed for Windows by Digital Cute.

It was originally released as a minigame within Musumaker (むすめーかー, Musumēkā; Daughter Maker), a life simulation eroge. The title name comes from a combination of the words "Buruma" (bloomers) and "Nya" (meow). All playable characters are moe anthropomorphization of a cat, and all bosses are the same of a mouse.

== GamePlay ==
The game system is generally a typical horizontal-scrolling shooters. It has three actions; moving the player's character, shooting and the bomb. The player's bullet power increases during the player is close to enemy's bullet. At the Easy or Normal difficulty level, the speed of enemy's bullets also becomes slower. In the Story mode, the game inserts scenes of dialogue between the protagonist and a boss character or thoughts of the protagonist. When Dark-Burunyan-man (ダークぶるにゃんマン) is selected, a H-scene is inserted in the end of each stage.

== Games ==
=== Soreyuke! Burunyan-man ===
The first game of the series (Soreyuke! Burunyan-man (それゆけ！ぶるにゃんマン)) was released as a minigame within Musumaker released for Windows on December 19, 2008.

=== Soreyuke! Burunyan-man Hardcore!!! ===
それゆけ！ぶるにゃんマン Hardcore!!!
- Developer: DigitalCute
- Publisher: JP: DigitalCute
- Platform: Microsoft Windows 98
- Release: 2012-01-27
- Genres: Shoot 'em up, Eroge

Soreyuke! Burunyan-man Hardcore!!! (それゆけ！ぶるにゃんまん はーどこあ！！！) was released on download stores on January 27, 2012. New playable characters include Sukunyan-man (すくにゃんマン) and Dark-Burunyan-man (ダークぶるにゃんマン).

=== Soreyuke! Burunyan-man Portable ===
それゆけ！ぶるにゃんマン Portable
- Publisher: JP: Alchemist
- Platform: PlayStation Portable
- Release: 2012-08-02; 2013-06-06
- Genre: Shoot 'em up

Soreyuke! Burunyan-man Portable (それゆけ！ぶるにゃんマンPortable) is a PlayStation Portable port of the Hardcore version.

Changes include the introduction of new playable character Meinyan-man (めいにゃんマン) joined., removal of Dark-Burunyan-man and hentai scenes.

==== Reception ====
Reception

Review score
Publication	Score
Famitsu	28/40

Famitsu reviewers awarded the Portable version a 28/40.

=== Soreyuke! Burunyan-man ECSTASY!!! ===
それゆけ！ぶるにゃんマンえくすたしー!!!
- Box art of the Ecstasy version
- Developer: DigitalCute
- Publisher: JP: DigitalCute
- Platform: Microsoft Windows
- Release: 2014-06-27
- Genres: Shoot 'em up, Eroge

Soreyuke! Burunyan-man ECSTASY!!! (それゆけ！ぶるにゃんマンえくすたしー!!!) was based on the Hardcore edition, but added elements from Portable version and added H-scenes.

In the new "Ecstasy" mode, combo system, breaking effect, new enemies and stages were added. Some enemies attack patterns were refreshed.

=== Go Go Burunyanman Ecstasy!!! Steam-Edition ===
Go Go Burunyanman Ecstasy!!! Steam-Edition
- Publisher: Steam?
- Platform: Microsoft Windows
- Release: 2016-04-06
- Genre: Shoot 'em up

Added on Steam Greenlight in April 2016, but was never released in part because of the retirement of the Greenlight program. It was intended to be a version of Burunyan-man ECSTASY!!! without eroge contents.
