= No Fate! Only the Power of Will =

2010 video game

- Xbox 360 version cover art
- Developer: Alchemist
- Publisher: Alchemist
- Platforms: Xbox 360; PlayStation Portable
- Release: JP: February 25, 2010
- Genre: Visual novel
- Mode: Single-player

No Fate! Only the Power of Will (のーふぇいと！- only the power of will -) is a Japanese visual novel developed and released by Alchemist on February 25, 2010. The gameplay in No Fate! Only the Power of Will follows a plot-line which offers pre-determined scenarios with courses of interaction.

== Gameplay ==
Much of the gameplay requires little interaction from the player as the majority of the time is spent reading the text that appears on the game's screen. The text being displayed represents the thoughts of the characters or the dialogue between them. The player is occasionally presented with choices to determine the direction of the game. Depending on what is chosen, the plot may progress in a specific direction.

== Story ==
Hero Iinchou (委員長) is walking around one day when a girl comes out of the sky. She said she was from the world beyond inner space. The plot revolves around her relationship with Iinchou and acclimating her to the school he attends.
