= Michiru Yuimoto =

Japanese voice actress

Michiru Yuimoto (結下 みちる, Yuimoto Michiru; born February 25 in Tokyo, Japan) is a Japanese voice actress. She also uses the alias Fūri Samoto, primarily for visual novels.

== Anime ==
- Fushigiboshi no Futagohime - Soma (ep 31)
- Happiness! - Jun Watarase
- Nanatsuiro Drops - Sumomo Akihime
- Koihime Musō - Daikyō, Shōkyō
- Shin Koihime Musō - Chinkyū Kōdai / Nenene
- Blessing of the Campanella - Nina Lindberg
- The Sacred Blacksmith - Patty Baldwin
- Fate/stay night - Kaede Makidera (TV)
- Mashiro-Iro Symphony - The color of lovers (TV) - Yuiko Amaha (eps 9, 11–12)
- Shuffle! (TV) as schoolgirl A (ep 6)

== Games ==
- Heart de Roommate - Marumu Ogamayama
