= Love & Destroy =

1999 video game

- Developer: Inti Creates (Note: Produced by Arc Entertainment. Additional work by Sony Computer Entertainment Japan.)
- Publisher: Sony Computer Entertainment
- Director: Makoto Yamaguchi
- Producers: Ryoji Agakawa; Akira Sato
- Designer: Yoshihisa Tsuda
- Artist: Masakazu Katsura
- Composer: Ippo Yamada
- Platform: PlayStation
- Release: JP: December 16, 1999
- Genres: Third-person shooter, dating sim
- Mode: Single-player

Love & Destroy (Note: Japanese: ラブアンドデストロイ, Hepburn: Rabu ando Desutoroi) is a 1999 third-person shooter video game developed by Inti Creates and published by Sony Computer Entertainment for the PlayStation. Set in the near future, the plot depicts an alien invasion which nearly brings about human extinction. To save humanity, a scientist sends three remaining mechs and their robotic, female navigators back in time where they recruit the unnamed, male protagonist as a mech pilot to stamp out the invasion. Bringing out the full, offensive potential of a mech requires a positive, emotional link between the human pilot and navigator.

Part of the gameplay in Love & Destroy is made up of 3D shooter missions, where the player battles enemies after choosing one of three navigators and her respective mech, each equipped with a unique set of weapons. These action segments alternate with romantic interactions between the player character and the navigators. The story unfolds differently depending on the player's use of navigator, on-screen choices, and performance during missions.

Staff members for SCEI subsidiary Arc Entertainment were previously known for their work on the Arc the Lad series of role-playing games, while Love & Destroy marked new developer Inti Creates' second overall release. Love & Destroy features character designs by manga artist Masakazu Katsura and animated cutscenes by the studio Production I.G. The game sold poorly and critical reception has been mixed.

== Gameplay ==
The player battles an enemy using the K-Silhouette. The player's health and remaining time are displayed top-right, while the selected weapon is on the bottom right.

Love & Destroy is a third-person shooter consisting of a series of missions where the player uses a Battle Pod mech to eliminate either a single, large boss or a group of smaller enemies. These battles have a five-minute time limit and take place in large, 3D cityscapes through which the player can freely maneuver. The environments are highly destructible, allowing the player to demolish any building. The game supports DualShock controller functionality with the analog sticks mapped to movement and aiming. The player can choose one of three mechs and its respective Q-Tron navigator for any mission. All of them come equipped with a basic vulcan cannon for targeting and firing at enemies from a distance, though each Battle Pod varies in speed and has a unique set of weapons. ViVi's "V-Silhouette" is the fastest but uses mostly weak, short-ranged melee attacks; LuLu's "L-Silhouette" is the slowest but uses mostly powerful, long-ranged projectiles; and KiKi's "K-Silhouette" has balanced speed and uses medium-ranged lasers that deal intermediate damage. One Battle Pod may present more of an advantage over another depending on the situation. Performing well increases the player's score and unlocks more powerful upgrades. If the player's health gauge depletes, the mission is a failure though it will not result in a game over. The storyline will progress regardless of whether a player accomplishes or fails a mission.

The game features dating sim mechanics between missions, which are shown as animated full motion videos (FMVs) depicting social and romantic interactions between the player character and the Q-Trons. During these sequences, the player can be presented with a choice of whether or not they like a particular Q-Tron. The plot unfolds differently and its outcome changes depending on the use of Q-Tron, on-screen choices, and mission success. Doing well in each mission and using the same Q-Tron repeatedly will foster the protagonist's relationship with her and result in a better ending for the characters. The player can also collect up to 100 voice clips from each Q-Tron. Some hidden clips break the fourth wall and require actions such as opening the PlayStation's disc lid.

== Plot ==
The story of Love & Destroy opens in the near future when an extraterrestrial entity known as "Germ" (Note: Japanese: ジャム, Hepburn: Jam) descended from the sky and began feeding off human stress, quickly spreading across Earth and leaving mass destruction in its wake. After a few decades, humanity developed measures to counter the invasion with "Battle Pod" (Note: Japanese: バトルポット, Hepburn: Batorupotto) technology. These weaponized mechs were equipped with "S.E.E.D." (Note: Japanese: シード, Hepburn: Shīdo) (Synchronized Energy of Emotive Dynamics), a system relying on positive, sympathetic emotions to effectively utilize their offensive capabilities. This would be best accomplished when each human pilot established a romantic connection with a robotic, female navigator called a "Q-Tron." (Note: Japanese: キュートロン, Hepburn: Kyūtoron) After years of fighting, the plan ultimately proved unsuccessful and humanity was nearly wiped out. In a final attempt to salvage the planet's future, a scientist sends three Q-Trons, their Battle Pods, and an instructor back in time to present day Japan, just before the appearance of the Germ. It is there that they across the unnamed player character, a male highschooler whom they rescue when the Germ initiates its attack. He then joins them in defending the world against the alien threat.

=== Characters ===
- ViVi (Note: Japanese: ビビ, Hepburn: Bibi): Voiced by Mao Motomura. The second model of Q-Tron produced. Feisty, rebellious, and obstinate, she is highly confident in her fighting ability and hates to lose. She is skilled in mechanics and weapons maintenance.
- LuLu (Note: Japanese: ルル, Hepburn: Lulu): Voiced by Natsumi Yanase. The prototype model of Q-Tron and leader of the group due to the vast amount of information she has accumulated. Calm and quiet with a sad disposition, she feels responsible for the deaths of many pilots during the war over the years. She is a machine operations and control specialist.
- KiKi (Note: Japanese: キキ, Hepburn: Kiki): Voiced by Kozue Yoshizumi. The newest model of Q-Tron produced. Sweet, cheerful, and curious, she strives to gain more experience as a navigator. Data management and program engineering are her area of expertise.
- Egg (Note: Japanese: エッグ, Hepburn: Eggu): Voiced by Wataru Takagi. A robot instructor in the form of an anthropomorphic egg with wings. It coordinates the missions with the pilots and Q-Trons.

== Development and release ==
Love & Destroy was developed by Inti Creates. Production was led by Arc Entertainment was a division of publisher Sony Computer Entertainment that was formed in 1997 and led by Ryoji Agakawa and Akira Sato. Sony's Japan Studio assisted on development. Prior to this, the subsidiary's staff was responsible for the Arc the Lad series of PlayStation role-playing games. The producer of those games, Agakawa, would serve the same role for Love & Destroy. Love & Destroy is the second game by Inti Creates, which was founded in 1996 by a group of former Capcom employees. It was designed by Yoshihisa Tsuda, the lead designer of the company's debut title Speed Power Gunbike. Love & Destroy was directed by Makoto Yamaguchi, who stated that the most difficult aspect of its development was his seclusion from his workers due to himself rarely bathing during long work hours. The game features character designs by manga artist Masakazu Katsura, known for love stories such as Video Girl Ai, DNA², and I"s. The FMV cutscenes were animated by the studio Production I.G., which had provided animation for SCEI's Yurodora series of romance visual novels for the PlayStation. Inti Creates' sole music composer at the time, Ippo Yamada, was responsible for creating the soundtrack and sound effects in Love & Destroy, as well other duties such as casting voice actors and booking recording studios. The game's ending features the vocal track, "My Glory Days," performed by Haruna Kawagoe.

Love & Destroy was released in Japan on December 16, 1999. A guidebook was issued by Shueisha the same day. Shueisha also published a light novel adaptation of the game on April 24, 2000, written by Tatsuya Hamasaki and featuring illustrations of Katsura's character designs by Takayuki Goto. The game was a commercial failure. SCEI restructured its game development process shortly thereafter, dissolving Arc Entertainment. Inti Creates, having also lost publisher Sony Music Entertainment Japan to the corporation's reorganization in 1998, once again found itself without funding and would not gain a foothold in the industry until a partnership with Capcom allowed them to develop the Mega Man Zero series a few years later.

== Reception ==
Reception

Review score
Publication	Score
Dengeki PlayStation	70/100, 75/100

Critical reception for Love & Destroy has been mixed. It received a score of 19 out of 40 by the Japanese gaming publication Weekly Famitsu. USgamer journalist Jeremy Parish stated, "It basically feels like everything about 'cool '90s Japan' rolled into a single video game [...] Like some sort of harem anime meets Neon Genesis Evangelion meets Omega Boost." GameSpot contributor James Mielke also compared its concept to Evangelion, equated its shooter gameplay to Armored Core, was impressed by its sense of scale, and described the game as "an impressive piece of software that, while not perfect, offers up some hectic fighting action." Bruno Sol of the Spanish magazine Superjuegos was less fond of the graphics and control in the battle portion, mentioning they did not live up Arc Entertainment's previous game The Granstream Saga. He admired the animation during the cutscenes and thought that the dating segments were the game's more interesting aspect, likening them to Tokimeki Memorial: Forever With You and the Yarudora series. Sol felt that Katsura's character designs did not meet the mangaka's standards, but speculated that they would be appreciated by the artist's fans nonetheless. Hardcore Gaming 101's Kurt Kulata summarized Love & Destroy as "unique and interesting" with a presentation resembling Hudson Soft's Bulk Slash for the Sega Saturn. However, he found it difficult to follow the action with the "occasionally claustrophobic camera and intense destruction" and doubted a player could develop a bond with the girls given the game's overall short length.
