= Heart de Roommate =

2002 video game

- The cover art of the English version.
- Developer(s): AngelSmile
- Publisher(s): JP: AngelSmile; NA: G-Collections; WW: Jast USA (Remaster)
- Platform(s): Microsoft Windows; macOS; Linux
- Release: JP: January 24, 2002; NA: January 1, 2004; WW: September 30, 2022 (Remaster)
- Genre(s): Visual novel, eroge
- Mode(s): Single-player

Heart de Roommate (はあとdeルームメイト) is a Japanese adult visual novel developed by AngelSmile for Microsoft Windows. It was released in Japan in January 2002, and later received an English translation by G-Collections in 2004. The game was re-released by Jast USA in 2022 as Heart de Roommate Remastered, an updated version with enhanced visuals and support for the macOS and Linux operating systems.

== Gameplay ==
The gameplay in Heart de Roommate is standard for a visual novel. The player spends most of the time reading text onscreen which indicates the narration, inner thoughts, or dialogue of the characters. At different points in the game, the player will be faced with a decision between two or more choices, which may progress the player in a specific path in the game and have a positive or negative effect on the plot.

Heart de Roommate is divided into twenty-six different "episodes" to resemble an anime series, even having an episode preview for each upcoming episode. It also has a special episode in which the characters announce which character will be the main heroine for the next half of the game, depending on the choices made by the player, this episode may or may not appear.

== Story ==
Yusuke Sawada had just been transferred by his parents into a new school, Aiho Academy. But, unfortunately, his parents forgot to enroll him in the dorm, and the apartment he was planning on staying in burnt down as he arrived. While complaining about his current situation, he is mistaken for a panty thief and attacked by a girl, Asumi Hirota, who happens to be his former childhood acquaintance. After realizing who he is, Asumi assumes that he is there to threaten her, and becomes uneasy. Asumi, believing Yusuke has something on her, decides to do something for him under one condition: he must not tell anyone her secret. However, Yusuke does not know what the secret is, but decides to pretend he does. After Asumi explains her condition, Yusuke asks if Asumi can give him a place to stay, Asumi agrees and takes him to the girl's dorm, but, because the dorm doesn't let males in the dorm, she must sneak him in. After meeting the roommates, he is accepted (with some debates) into their room.

== Characters ==
- Yusuke Sawada (沢田 勇介, Sawada Yusuke)

The main character, whom the player takes the role of. He complains constantly about things going bad in his life and believes he has bad luck.

- Asumi Hirota (広田 明日美, Hirota Asumi) (Voiced by: Asamiya Saki)

The self-appointed leader of the roommates. She is very energetic and is constantly picking on Yusuke, she can become angry very quickly but, despite her outward appearance, is very kind and sweet. Later on the extra ending, she is known to have a dangerous disease.

- Tomoe Katsuragi (桂木 朋絵, Katsuragi Tomoe) (Voiced by: Izumi Maki)

She is a shy, sweet girl who cares deeply for her friends. When first meeting Yusuke she is very shy toward him as she isn't good with guys, but as time passes, she grows to like him.

- Marumu Ogamayama (小熊山 まるむ, Ogumayama Marumu) (Voiced by: Michiru Yuimoto)

A very strange and quiet girl who shows very little emotion. She doesn't say much but when she does talk, it is usually in a joking manner. Her lack of emotion is due to an accident which damaged her brain causing her to lose all of her emotions.

- Namiki Honjo (本庄 なみき, Honjō Namiki)

Yusuke's cousin who makes him call her sister. She is just as energetic as Asumi and even has a similar hair style and color to her. She is a little older than the roommates but is in the same grade as them.

- Yoshiko Yagami (八神 良子, Yagami Yoshiko)

She is the homeroom teacher of the four roommates and is very kind to her students, even will to bend rules as to get them out of trouble and putting her own self on the line to help them.

== Remaster ==
In September 2022, Jast USA released a remaster of Heart de Roommate, titled Heart de Roommate Remastered. The remaster features high definition visuals, improved user interfaces, and additional ports to macOS and Linux.

== Reception ==
Heart de Roommate has received generally positive reviews. In his review of the game, HonestGamers Editor-in-Chief Jason Venter stated "Heart de Roommate should be considered a must-have for anyone interested in seeing the genre’s best without feeling like a complete pervert." Russian gaming magazine Strana Igr gave the game an informal 8/10 score, while simultaneously cautioning against playing Heart de Roommate as a first introduction to Japanese media.
