= Speed Power Gunbike =

1998 video game

- Developer: Inti Creates
- Publisher: Sony Music Entertainment Japan
- Director: Yoshihisa Tsuda
- Producer: Takuya Aizu
- Designer: Yoshihisa Tsuda
- Artists: Toru Nakayama; Keiichi Nabetani
- Composer: Ippo Yamada
- Platform: PlayStation
- Release: PlayStation: JP: April 23, 1998; PlayStation Network: JP: January 27, 2016
- Genre: Action
- Mode: Single-player

Speed Power Gunbike (Note: Also known as Variable Running Gunbike (Japanese: 可変走攻ガンバイク, Hepburn: Kahen Sōkō Gunbike) in Japan.) is an action video game for the PlayStation, released exclusively in Japan on April 23, 1998, from publisher Sony Music Entertainment Japan. It is the first game developed by Inti Creates, a group of designers with similar goals and interests who had recently broken off from Capcom. The game was heavily inspired by science fiction anime of the 1980s.

Set in Japan in the post-apocalyptic year of 2097, Speed Power Gunbike entails the war between humanity's last survivors and a technologically advanced race known as the Michi. The plot follows a team consisting of three members, each piloting a titular "Gunbike", a weaponized vehicle capable of taking different forms including a motorcycle and a bipedal mech. The player takes control of one these three characters, utilizing the different forms of the Gunbike to traverse a series of enemy-filled, 3D stages. The objective is to complete each stage and to reach and defeat its boss before a meter, representing both a time limit and the player's health, runs out.

Speed Power Gunbike suffered from underwhelming sales numbers upon its launch. Inti Creates blamed this on their own lack of experience appealing to a wider audience, the game's rushed development, and poor marketing by its publisher. Review scores for the game have been widely mediocre. Its gameplay had a mixed response from media outlets with some viewing it as overly difficult due to complex controls and a faulty camera system. The game's 3D polygonal graphics were mostly praised and its visual design has been favorably compared to other science fiction properties.

== Gameplay and premise ==
The player traverses a stage in Bike mode. The "Anergy" meter on top left acts a both a time limit and the player's health.

Speed Power Gunbike is an action game with a story that takes place in Japan in the post-apocalyptic year of 2097. An invading race known as the Michi has staked its claim on Earth by artificially creating extreme changes in the planet's atmosphere, pushing humanity to the brink of extinction. To fight the Michi, the remaining humans establish a counter-offensive centered around the use of transformable, combat vehicles called "Gunbikes". The game focuses on a squad of Gunbike pilots that includes Ippei (Note: Japanese: イッペー, Hepburn: Ippē) (voiced by Wataru Takagi), an ambitious youth fighting to avenge the death of his brother; Major Nohno (Note: Japanese: ノウノ, Hepburn: Nouno) (voiced by Toshiyuki Morikawa), a level-headed military commander and leader of the unit; and Ami (Note: Japanese: アミ, Hepburn: Ami) (voiced by Sachiko Sugawara), a robot devised using a hybrid of human and Michi technology and made specifically to be a Gunbike rider. The player is given the option to choose one of these three characters and their respective Gunbike at the start of the game. The game offers a tutorial or "Training" mode for learning the numerous Gunbike mechanics and an "Operation" mode that offers each character's story.

Stages in Speed Power Gunbike are presented in 3D with a third-person perspective of the player character. The objective is to reach the end of each stage while avoiding obstacles, breaking through barriers, battling enemies, and then defeating a boss in a large arena. The player is tasked with doing all this while keeping watch on the Gunbike's "Anergy" meter, which acts as both health and a time limit and slowly ticks down from its full tank of 99, shown on a heads-up display (HUD). The meter drops rapidly every time damage is taken from enemies and will result in a game over should it hit zero. Bonus items can be picked up to refill the meter. Gunbikes can transform into three different modes. These modes can swapped between at any time with each one having different control schemes and certain advantages over the others.

The first, Bike mode, appears as a motorcycle and is used primarily to quickly race through a stage at high speeds, but is easily affected by enemy attack and is difficult to turn. Gamepad buttons are mapped to acceleration, braking, and destroying enemies and stage barriers when at high speeds. The second, Robot mode, appears as a much slower, bipedal mech that offers high offensive and defensive capabilities. Simultaneous presses of different face buttons allow this mode to utilize a laser cannon, a rush maneuver, or a jump-thrust attack for battling enemies. The third, Rally mode, appears as a three-wheeled buggy, is easier to turn than the other modes, and is effective at exploring non-linear portions of a stage. Hitting two or more enemies or barriers in a row in either Bike or Rally mode will create a "Rush" combination that can be racked up for performing a special dash attack while in Robot mode. An even more powerful attack, capable of wiping out all on-screen enemies, can be executed if enough combinations are done in succession in order to fill the HUD's "G-Power" meter.

== Development and release ==
Speed Power Gunbike was the first game developed by Inti Creates, a company formed in 1996 by 11 ex-Capcom staffers with similar goals and passions. Lacking a publisher for their first project, they turned to Sony Computer Entertainment (SCE), which had the PlayStation Club Digital Entertainment Program (DEP) sponsorship for individual game designers or teams. One of the Inti Creates members won an award for "best creation in the professional category" with a 10 million yen prize. After negotiating with the publisher's parent company, Sony Music Entertainment Japan (SME), group members invested 10 million yen apiece to establish the company as a second-party developer to Sony. Yoshihisa Tsuda was the designer and director of Speed Power Gunbike, while Inti Creates president and CEO Takuya Aizu took on the role of producer. Toru Nakayama designed the characters and did the mechanical designs alongside Keiichi Nabetani. Noboru Honda devised the game's concept. According to Aizu, the team members chose to create Speed Power Gunbike based on their own personal interests: "We assumed that whatever game we want to create would be the kind of game that consumers would enjoy. So, we basically just created the game we wanted to create without worrying too much about its appeal". The game's premise was largely inspired by science fiction anime of the 1980s in order to cater to a PlayStation user demographic of young males in their teens or 20s. However, it was structured as to not pay homage to a specific anime property.

Development took 18 months. The first year was spent building the prototype, alpha version of the game. When this version was presented to SME, Tsuda was told it should have been more finished; he recalled that Capcom had been less strict with regards to its alpha versions. Despite its focus on action, the design team wanted to worldbuild though a dramatic script with spoken dialogue. Once the characters were established, voice actors were hired to fit their respective roles. Casting of voice talent was done by Ippo Yamada, who was also responsible for nearly all other facets of the game's audio design including composing the musical score, creating sound effects, converting sound data, and booking recording studios. Wataru Takagi was chosen to voice the lead character Ippei because the producer was a fan of his work on the anime series After War Gundam X and because his voice fit the producer's penchant for including "hot" characters in his games. The role allowed Takagi to establish a relationship with Inti Creates, as he would continue to provide voice-overs for the company's games for decades thereafter.

A pre-release version of Speed Power Gunbike was showcased at the Autumn Tokyo Game Show in September 1997 alongside other SME titles like Tenchu: Stealth Assassins, Lagnacure, DamDam Stompland, and Escaper. News outlets reported that Speed Power Gunbike was originally set to be released in Japan that November. After a delay, it launched on April 23, 1998. It sold poorly and received underwhelming feedback from consumers. "This was a really important lesson for us, and we learned a lot from that project," Aizu lamented. "We realized that producing a title that'll appeal to others is actually quite difficult, and that we really have to think about our audience instead of just think about what we want to create." The producer stated that the team was ultimately dissatisfied with the finished product, having lacked the time to complete it the way they had envisioned. He also blamed poor advertising from Sony Music, claiming that there were both disagreements and a lack of communication between the developer and SME's marketing department regarding the game's target audience. Though its creators had vastly overestimated its success in Japan due its mecha premise, Aizu speculated that it was not even considered for release in North America due to this type of fiction's lack of popularity overseas. SME ceased its funding of game production soon after, so Inti Creates partnered with its subsidiary SCE for its next title, Love & Destroy. Speed Power Gunbike was adapted into a novel by Fumihiko Iino, which was published on October 1, 1998, by Shogakukan. Speed Power Gunbike was made available on the Japanese PlayStation Network, including the PlayStation 3 and PlayStation Portable, on January 27, 2016, via publisher City Connection's Clarice Games label.

== Reception ==
Reception

Review scores
Publication	Score
Famitsu	23 / 40
GameSpot	6.6 / 10
Mega Fun	48%
Ação Games	6.5/10
Dengeki PlayStation	65/100, 65/100
Gamers' Republic	C+

Critical reception for Speed Power Gunbike has been consistently mediocre. The gaming press offered a mixed response its gameplay and challenge owing to either its controls, level design, camera, or a combination of these aspects. Dave Halverson of Gamers' Republic positively proclaimed, "The gameplay's a speedy mix of dodging, transforming, destroying, and racing through a bleak metallic landscape. The missions are generously timed, often include mild puzzle elements, and have stunning climaxes." However, he faulted game's "tricky" controls and "sporadically mediocre" level design. GameSpot writer Josh Smith similarly described its "sluggish and awkward" controls and maze-like stages as serious flaws and that mastering the game's training mode was required to surmount its extreme difficulty. Anthony Chau of GameFan and Georg Döller of Mega Fun also criticized the controls and found that the fast-paced, action heavy gameplay became too monotonous or boring in the long run. Both Smith and Joe Salina of Hardcore Gaming 101 criticized the camera for taking too long to correctly position itself behind the player character's viewpoint when he or she is quickly turned around. Smith explained, "Like a lot of third-person 3D shooters, heavy emphasis on rotation often leaves you staring at yourself in the face, rather than the direction in which you're travelling. Speed Power Gunbike seems to pull itself out of such predicaments with alarming lethargy." However, Salina offered a much more supportive opinion of the overall gameplay, likening it to a Sonic the Hedgehog game. The reviewer had no issues with its controls and concluded there was little to dislike "unless you absolutely hate both racing and action games." In another positive blurb, Retro Gamer suggested that the gameplay mechanics were initially difficult to grasp, but that it offered a rewarding experience once players could overcome the learning curve. The magazine echoed Salina's comparison, calling it "some kind of strange, less forgiving alternate universe Sonic game that wanted the player to earn the feeling of freedom and speed."

Reviewers including Chau, Smith, Salina, and Ação Games praised the game's 3D polygonal graphics. Chau noted its "hand-drawn polygon" visuals to match those of both Tail Concerto and Mega Man Legends. Halverson also mentioned the game's boss encounters as being visually analogous to Mega Man Legends, though he remarked the graphics in Speed Power Gunbike as a shortcoming due to the limitations of the original PlayStation's 3D graphical capabilities. While Chau was satisfied with the game's frame rate of 30 frames-per-second, Halverson felt that increasing it would have improved his own experience. Both Chau and Smith were distracted by instances of horizon "pop-up" when driving in Bike mode. Critics have favorably paralleled the aesthetic of Speed Power Gunbike to various science fiction and cyberpunk anime properties. Halverson, Salina, and Retro Gamer all likened the game's use of motorcycles in a futuristic setting to the film Akira. Famitsu, Retro Gamer, and Chau saw the game's setting as being similar to Megazone 23, Cyber City Oedo 808, and Bubblegum Crisis respectively. Both Chau and Ultra Game Players compared the game's Gunbikes to the Cyclone mecha from Robotech. Salina described each Gunbike as "a mixture of KITT from Knight Rider and a Transformer." The game's use of English text has been humorously ridiculed as Engrish, particularly the game over message which exclaims, "Anergy empty!! You all over!!"
