= Gal Gun =

2011 video game

- Developer: Inti Creates
- Publishers: Alchemist (2011–12); JP/AS: Inti Creates (2021); NA/EU: PQube (2021)
- Series: Gal Gun
- Platforms: Xbox 360; PlayStation 3; Nintendo Switch; Windows
- Release: Xbox 360; JP: January 27, 2011; PlayStation 3; JP: February 23, 2012; Nintendo Switch; JP/AS: January 28, 2021; NA/EU: February 12, 2021; Windows; WW: February 12, 2021
- Genres: Bishōjo, rail shooter
- Mode: Single-player

Gal Gun (Note: Japanese: ぎゃる☆がん, Hepburn: Gyaru Gan), stylized as Gal★Gun, is a 2011 rail shooter game series developed by Inti Creates and published by Alchemist.

The games takes place in a fictional academy in Japan, where the player takes the role of a male student clumsily chosen by an angel to fix up problems she might have caused in her cupid-esque activities. The player must shoot female classmates lustfully running after him due to said mistakes with "Pheromone Arrows" to prevent them from making their partner, while falling for one of the four main heroines before each game's designated deadline. The mainline games are a parody and homage of harem and romance tropes popular during the mid to late Heisei era.

Gal Gun was first released on Xbox 360 on January 27, 2011, followed by a PlayStation 3 port a year later. A sequel, Gal Gun: Double Peace, was released in Japan for PlayStation 4 and PlayStation Vita in 2015, and a remastered version titled Gal Gun Returns (Note: Japanese: ぎゃる☆がん りたーんず, Hepburn: Gyaru Gan Rita ̄ nzu) was released in Japan and Asia for Nintendo Switch on January 28, 2021, and in North America and Europe on February 12. A Windows version was also released worldwide on the same date.

A spin-off series, Gal Guardians, was first released in 2023 and revolves around the demon hunting miko heroines of Double Peace, taking on the monsters of hell in gothic, Castlevania inspired games, albeit, with the series' trademark humor.

== Gameplay ==
The player moves a reticle on the screen to fire at schoolgirls running towards the player. A girl on the centre-right has just been shot at her weak spot as indicated by an "Ecstasy Shot!!" pop-up on the right. The player's health, and the "Heart Gauge" can be seen on the lower right.

Gal Gun is a rail shooter and bishōjo game. The player controls the protagonist, Tenzou, to shoot down his female classmates with "Pheromone Arrow", while he moves automatically through predetermined route on each stage. The player may use the analogue stick or mouse to move the reticle on the screen. Girls run toward the player attempting to profess their love via notes or screams that must be prevented by firing at them. If player fails to do so, this results in damage to his health. The girls who have been shot receive euphoria, subduing them in process. Each girl has their own weak point in their body that results in an "Ecstasy Shot", subduing them immediately if shot. As the game progresses through each stage, the player may confront female teachers that must be shot multiple times, making them harder to subdue.

During "Doki Doki Mode", the player zooms in and shoots at the selected part of the girl, which fills the gauge on the left. This mode is often the main subject of censorship, as well the controversy regarding rewarding players for "sexualising" in-game girls.

If the player subdues enough girls, the Heart Gauge fills up, which enables option to initiate "Doki Doki Mode", by aiming on a girl and pressing the button. During Doki Doki Mode, the player needs to fill a "Doki Doki Gauge" within the time limit by zooming in and shooting at the selected part on the girl. More sensitive parts of the girl will fill the gauge faster, but the girl will block the part quickly. When the gauge is full, the player can give her euphoria, and "Doki Doki Bomb" will subdue all the other girls on the screen. Tenzou's stats also changes depending on the selected girl.

The game has dating sim-based Story Mode, where player may be asked to answer the questions from the main characters. The player's answer affects the main girl's love interest on Tenzou, which affects the story progression and the ending.

During Story Mode "Action Events" may occur, which can be either a mini-game or boss battle. The player's performance during such events will also affect the progression towards the ending.

The developer also added a panic button that switches the action for a retro-looking game, with authentic animations and sounds. This is referred to as a Mama kita gamen or "Mom arrived screen".

In the original Xbox 360 version, the player could control the camera below the hemline of the girl during Doki Doki Mode. However, Microsoft ordered the game publisher, Alchemist, to eliminate this feature by releasing "Panties Protect Patch" [sic] update on March 18, 2011. This change only affects the Xbox 360 version, and therefore does not affect subsequent releases on other platforms.

== Synopsis ==
The first game takes place in a fictional academy, named Sakurazaki Academy. The apprentice cupid angel, named Patako, must shoot an assigned person with a so-called "Pheromone Arrow" in order to graduate. Patako targets the protagonist Tenzou Motesugi, a second-year male student, with her crossbow, in hope of getting a girlfriend when shot with an arrow, as she claimed he has no experience with the girls. However, she accidentally shoots Tenzou with sixteen arrows instead of one, as it was somehow set to full-automatic "overkill" firing mode without her knowledge.

The aura effect created by multiple shots causes him to attract female students from the entire school, trying to confess their love of him, and they desperately run after him trying to make him their partner. This effect only lasts for a single day of his life. Patako refers him as "Way Too Freakin' Popular" ("WTFP").

An unintended major consequence he faces after being shot with multiple arrows is if he is unable to find a girlfriend before the sunset, he will be destined for a life of loneliness.

The player can choose one of four main "True Love" girls. Each has different route, and features different endings, as well depending on player's progression.

== Release ==
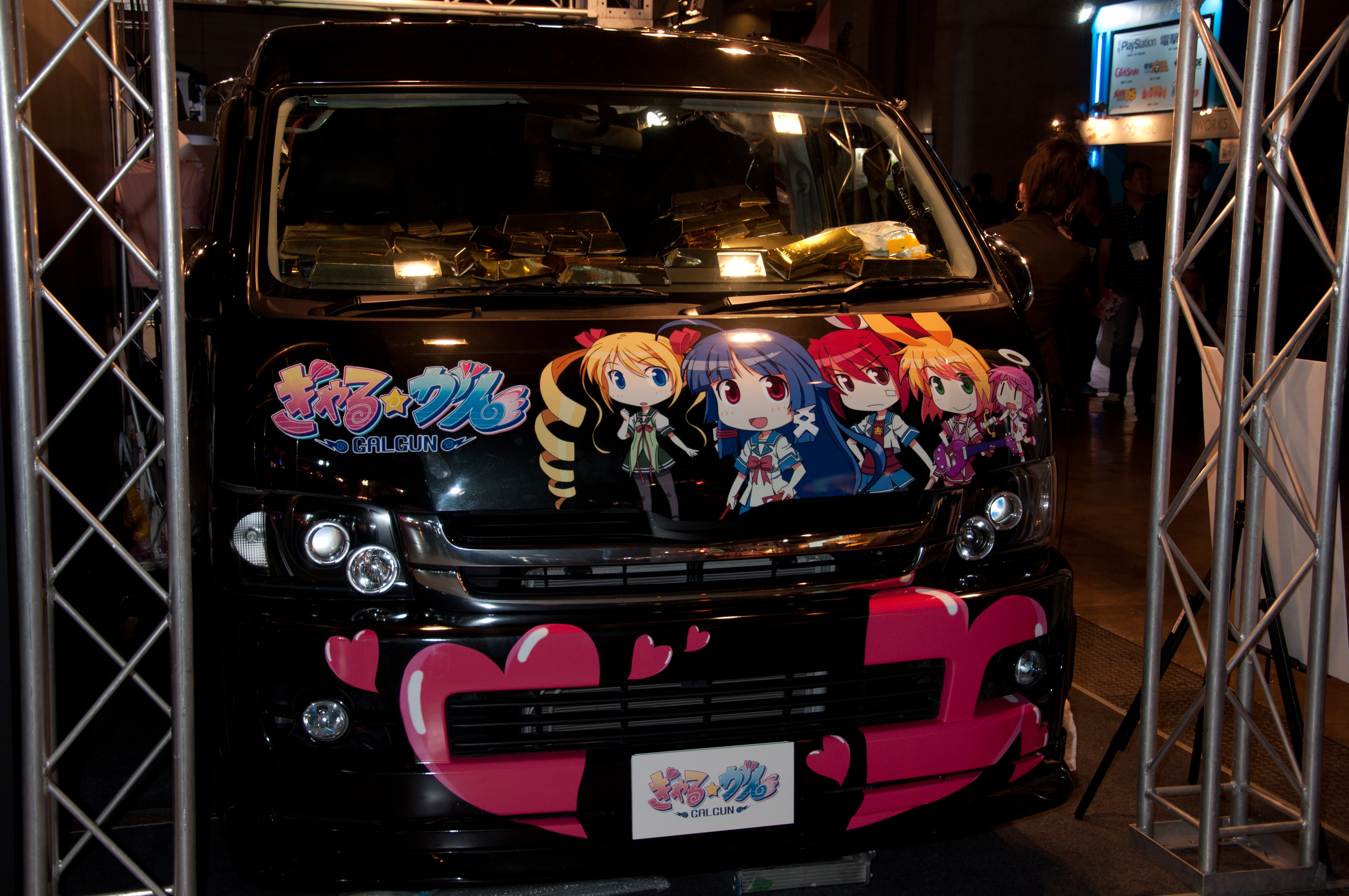
A Gal Gun promotion at the 2010 Tokyo Game Show.

Gal Gun was originally released on the Xbox 360 in Japan on January 27, 2011. A PlayStation 3 port with additional characters and PlayStation Move support was released on February 23, 2012.

To commemorate the original release's 10th anniversary, a remastered version, titled Gal Gun Returns, was released in Japan and Asia for Nintendo Switch on January 28, 2021. Unlike the original title, Gal Gun Returns is localized. It was released in North America and Europe on February 12, alongside the Windows version for all regions. An Xbox One version of the game was initially planned for release alongside both systems, but was later cancelled.

== Reception ==
Reception

Aggregate score
Aggregator	Score
Metacritic	NS: 68/100

Review scores
Publication	Score
Destructoid	6/10 (NS)
Famitsu	7/10, 6/10, 6/10, 7/10 (XB360) 8/10, 8/10, 8/10, 8/10 (PS3)
Nintendo Life	4/10 (NS)
Nintendo World Report	6.5/10 (NS)

Four reviewers in Famitsu reviewed the Xbox 360 version of Gal Gun. The reviewers generally found the game fun, with one complimenting how surprisingly well the bishōjo game and shooter game mechanics worked together. The same reviewers found the lack of background music made the game feel monotonous while another said it lacked mini-games or other events to give more variety to the game. While one reviewer said that all the girls were cute in the game, their facial expressions and animations were somewhat limited and their reactions were somewhat limited. One reviewer found the "Doki Doki" mode fun while two others found it monotonous and that the girls reactions made them feel embarrassed respectively.

Reviewing the PlayStation 3 version, reviewers in Famitsu complimented the sillier nature of the game, how it incoporated the PlayStation Move and that it additional features from the Xbox 360 version and that some of the more erotic content was not censored. While giving it higher scores, these reviewers still commented that the game grew monotonous as it went on.

Gal Gun Returns for the Nintendo Switch received mixed reception from critics, currently holding a 68 on review aggregator Metacritic for the Switch version.

== Sequels and spin-offs ==
A sequel, Gal Gun: Double Peace, was released in Japan for PlayStation 4 and PlayStation Vita on August 6, 2015. Noting the praise of the first game received from players outside Japan, Inti Creates released Double Peace on July 22, 2016 in Europe and August 2 in North America, making the first game in the series being released worldwide.

A virtual reality (VR) tech demo game, Gal Gun VR, was released worldwide for PC on August 9, 2017 via Steam.

A third official game in the series, titled Gal Gun 2, was released in Japan on March 15, 2018 for the Nintendo Switch and PlayStation 4 and a PC port was released on July 20 via Steam. The Japanese version was published by Inti Creates, whilst the North American and European release were handled by PQube Games.

Mighty Gunvolt, an 8-bit styled spin-off of Inti Creates' other title, Azure Striker Gunvolt, features Ekoro from Gal Gun as a playable character. The game was originally released for the Nintendo 3DS in August 2014, while a PlayStation 4 and Vita port, titled Gal Gunvolt, was released on August 6, 2015 to coincide with the release of Double Peace.

On February 23, 2023, Inti Creates released Gal Guardians: Demon Purge for the Nintendo Switch, PlayStation 4, PlayStation 5, Xbox Series X/S, Xbox One, and Windows as a spinoff of Double Peace, which stars sisters Shinobu and Maya Kamizono, protagonists from Gal*Gun: Double Peace and Gal*Gun 2, as they discover a castle filled with demons that suddenly appears at Sakurazaki Academy with their job being to demon hunter duo to solve the mystery of what happened to the school and its students. The game also features Kurona, a mischievous demon girl and antagonist from the same two games, challenging the sisters. The game is a 2D action platformer with heavy inspiration from Castlevania in which players explore the castle, finding secrets, battling enemies and bosses, and obtaining items to advance the story and access new areas in either single player or co-op gameplay with a depth scoring system.

On September 2024, a sequel, Gal Guardians: Servants of the Dark, was announced. It is a co-op Metroidvania platformer inspired by Koji Igarashi's run on the Castlevania series. The main heroines are two demon maids who must battle other demon lords in order to revive their perished own, all while paying mind of the presence of Kamizono sisters of the previous game causing chaos in the demon world. On March 27, 2025, the game was officially released. It currently stand at "Generally Favorable" on Metacritic.
