= Your Diary (video game) =

2011 video game

- Your Diary original visual novel cover featuring (from left to right): Sayuki Ayase, Kanade Hirosaki, Yua and Yūhi Minagawa

ユアダイアリー (Yua Daiarī)
- Genre: Drama, Fantasy, Romance
- Video game
- Developer: Cube
- Publisher: Cuffs (Windows); Alchemist (PSP); Hobibox (Windows); Entergram (PS4. PS Vita)
- Genre: Eroge, Visual novel
- Platform: Windows, PSP, PS4, PS Vita
- Released: JP: September 30, 2011 (Windows); WW: August 10, 2018 (Windows)
- Manga
- Written by: Cube
- Illustrated by: Sō Hamayumiba
- Published by: Hakusensha
- Magazine: Young Animal Island (2012–2013); Young Animal Innocent (2014)
- Original run: June 29, 2012 – March 19, 2014
- Volumes: 1

Your Diary (ユアダイアリー, Yua Daiarī) is a Japanese adult visual novel developed by Cube, a brand of Cuffs. It was originally released on September 30, 2011, for Microsoft Windows. Later, Alchemist ported the game without the erotic content to the PlayStation Portable. Your Diary will be released for the PlayStation 4 and PlayStation Vita. The story revolves around Tomoki Nagamine, who has feelings for an upperclassman named Sayuki Ayase. Upon receiving a diary from the library manager, he is informed by Yua that all of his happiest memories will be recorded in the diary.

The gameplay of Your Diary follows a branching plot line which offers pre-determined scenarios with courses of interaction, and focuses on the appeal of the four female main characters by the player character. The game ranked as the third best-selling bishōjo game at the time of its release. It received a manga adaptation which serialized in Hakusensha's Young Animal Island between volumes 19 and 24.

== Gameplay ==
Average dialogue and narrative in Your Diary. Here, Tomoki is talking to Yua.

Your Diary is a romance visual novel in which the player assumes the role of Tomoki Nagamine. Much of its gameplay is spent reading the text that appears on the screen, which represents the story's narrative and dialogue. The text is accompanied by character sprites, which represent who Tomoki is talking to, over background art. Throughout the game, the player encounters CG artwork at certain points in the story, which take the place of the background art and character sprites. Your Diary follows a branching plot line with multiple endings, and depending on the decisions that the player makes during the game, the plot will progress in a specific direction.

There are four main plot lines in the original Windows release that the player will have the chance to experience, one for each of the heroines in the story. Throughout gameplay, the player is given multiple options to choose from, and text progression pauses at these points until a choice is made. Some decisions can lead the game to end prematurely and offer an alternative ending to the plot. To view all plot lines in their entirety, the player will have to replay the game multiple times and choose different choices to further the plot to an alternate direction. In adult versions of the game, there are scenes depicting Tomoki and a given heroine having sex.

== Plot ==
=== Story ===
Your Diary main heroines from left to right: Yūhi, Sayuki, Kanade, and Yua.

Tomoki Nagamine attempts to confess his love to an upperclassman named Sayuki Ayase; however, he does not succeed in doing so, being caught off by a sad expression on her face. In the meantime, he works alongside his crush Sayuki in the library committee. One day, after wandering into a seemingly-abandoned library, the library manager Misuzu gives Tomoki a diary called "Your Diary", telling him that the book chose him. A cute girl introducing herself as Yua—who is the goddess of happiness—comes bursting out of the book and informs Tomoki that all his happiest memories will be recorded in his diary. The story mostly revolves around Tomoki interacting with the four heroines (in later versions, seven) and eventually forming a romantic relationship with one.

=== Main characters ===
Tomoki Nagamine (長峰 智希, Nagamine Tomoki)
The protagonist and playable character of Your Diary. He has a crush on Sayuki but is unable to express his feelings for her. Tomoki works as a member in the library committee alongside her, in hopes of coming to understand her more. He is a generally serious person, yet he tends to be oblivious when it comes to love. Upon being given a diary, all of his happiest memories are to be written down.

Yua (ゆあ)
Voiced by: Ryōko Watanabe
Yua, the main heroine of Your Diary, is a bubbly and energetic girl who claims to be the goddess of happiness. Despite being a deity, she doesn't seem to have any special powers. She has a somewhat childish demeanor which causes her to be teased by other characters. Yua gets along with most people because of her carefree attitude and cheerfulness.

Sayuki Ayase (綾瀬 紗雪, Ayase Sayuki)
Voiced by: Cedric
Being the eldest member of the library committee, she acts like a big sister to everyone else, to Yua in particular. Graceful and smart, Sayuki is the object of Tomoki's affections. Tomoki was unable to confess to her when seeing her sad expression which leads to him joining the library committee. Sayuki has a mysterious aura and seems to bear some secrets of her own.

Yūhi Minagawa (深菜川 夕陽, Minagawa Yūhi)
Voiced by: Miyako Suzuta
The childhood friend of Tomoki who lives above the café she works at part-time. Her mother died a few years ago so she works with her father to keep the family business running. Yūhi is talented at cooking and her homemade dessert is very popular. Like Sayuki, she has secret feelings for Tomoki, but she hides these feelings and often acts tsundere towards him.

Kanade Hirosaki (広崎 かなで, Hirosaki Kanade)
Voiced by: Misono Moriya
Kanade is the younger sister of Hibiki, Tomoki's friend. A first-year at school, she is extremely timid and cries often which causes her to be teased. One of her hobbies is drawing memories from her past. Even though Kanade already has a brother, she likes to think of the protagonist as a brother as he would often play games with her when she was a young child.

Kaho Enomoto (榎本 香穂, Enomoto Kaho)
Voiced by: Ui
A good friend of Tomoki and Yūhi who is also their classmate. Kaho is quite popular at school, especially with lesbian girls. More than anything else, Kaho likes to either participate in sports or create a commotion. Kaho was a sub-character in the original version of Your Diary, but she was promoted to a heroine in Your Diary+.

Natsuki Fujimura (藤村 奈月, Fujimura Natsuki)
Voiced by: Natsu Sawata
Natsuki is a friend and classmate of Kanade. They are similar in the fact that they both have a shy nature. Because Natsuki barely talks at all and is usually emotionless, it is difficult to tell what she is thinking. The most important person to her is Kanade, her only friend. In Your Diary+, she is promoted to a heroine from a sub-character.

Hotori Ichinose (一ノ瀬 ほとり, Ichinose Hotori)
Voiced by: Shiho Moriyasu
Hotori was added as a heroine in Your Diary+. She is a dainty girl who attends the same school as Tomoki. Being good-looking and helpful, she has no problem befriending others. Hotori often visits the café Yūhi works at.

== Development and release ==
Your Diary is the second title developed by Cube. The game was planned to have fantasy elements incorporated in, unlike Cube's previous visual novel Natsu no Ame, which was thought by staff to be quite a realistic story. The scenario was written by Inori Tanemura and Airu Minamoto. In Your Diary+ and Your Diary+H, Ryoichi Futaba assisted in writing the screenplay. Character designs were drawn by Kantoku, who is best known for his illustrations in the light novel series The "Hentai" Prince and the Stony Cat; the super deformed (SD) art was by Suimya. Lastly, the game was directed by Naoto Sakura.

Your Diary was first released on September 30, 2011, in limited edition for Microsoft Windows, containing the game itself and coming bundled with a soundtrack CD as an extra bonus. A regular edition, with different package art, was released on July 27, 2012. Alchemist released an all-ages version under the title Your Diary+ for the PlayStation Portable on November 28, 2013; the limited edition release comes with a maxi single. Your Diary+ introduces a new heroine, and two sub-characters are promoted to heroines. An updated version of Your Diary+ with added H-content was released for Microsoft Windows under the title Your Diary+H on May 30, 2014. A vocal CD comes bundled with +H's limited release. Hobibox released an English and Chinese-translated version of the game on August 10, 2018, which is playable on Steam. On June 27, 2019, Your Diary+ was released simultaneously on the PlayStation 4 and PlayStation Vita consoles by Entergram.

== Related media ==
=== Manga ===
A manga adaptation based on Your Diary, drawn by manga artist Sō Hamayumiba, was serialized between volumes 19 and 24 of Hakusensha's Young Animal Island sold between June 29, 2012 and September 27, 2013. Alongside the final issue (No. 24) of Young Animal Island, a single tankōbon volume (ISBN 978-4592143444) was released under the Jets Comics imprint. The manga continued serialization in volume 1 of Young Animal Innocent sold on March 19, 2014, but the manga has been unfinished ever since. Ever Glory Publishing has licensed the manga and released a volume in Taiwanese on May 28, 2014.

=== Music and audio CDs ===
Your Diary features music by Duca, who performs the opening theme, "Clover" (クローバー, Kurōbā), and ending theme, "Colorful Diary" (カラフルDiary, Karafuru Diary). Your Diary+ replaces the original opening and ending themes with "Lost Happiness" (幸せのオトシモノ, Shiawase no Otoshimono) and "If I'm With You" (キミとなら, Kimi to Nara). Your Diary+H employs Duca's "Wishing You" as an image song.

The game's original soundtrack titled Your's Sound Diary CD came bundled with the limited edition release of Your Diary, containing background music (BGM) tracks and game-size versions of the opening and ending theme. A maxi single titled Your Diary+ Vocal CD comes bundled with the consumer port's limited edition release, containing the songs used in Your Diary+. A vocal CD titled Your's Songs Diary CD was released with the limited edition of +H, and contained various songs from Your Diary sang by seiyuu. A new character song called "Platonic Syndrome", sang by Yua's seiyuu Ryōko Watanabe, was included.

== Reception ==
Your Diary+

Review score
Publication	Score
Famitsu	30 / 40

Your Diary ranked as the third best-selling bishōjo game at the time of its release on Getchu.com, a major redistributor of visual novel and domestic anime products. During the next month, the game ranked again at twenty one out of thirty. Your Diary was the twenty fourth best-selling game of the year on the website. The Japanese video game magazine Famitsu reviewed Your Diary+, and gave it a total review score of 30/40 (out of the four individual review scores of 8, 8, 7, and 7). In the Famitsu review, Kantoku's character designs were considered to be attractive and the game's system was praised for making it easy to complete the game. Your Diary+ was the 666th best selling video game of the year in Japan in 2013, with 5,726 units sold.
