= Tsuki wa Higashi ni Hi wa Nishi ni =

Japanese adult visual novel video game

- Operation Sanctuary
- Cover from the Operation Sanctuary video game

月は東に日は西に (Tsuki wa Higashi ni Hi wa Nishi ni)
- Genre: Harem, Romance, Comedy, Fantasy, Science fiction
- Video game
- Developer: August
- Publisher: August
- Genre: Eroge, Visual novel
- Platform: Windows, Dreamcast, PlayStation 2
- Released: JP: July 20, 2003 (Windows); JP: June 24, 2004 (Dreamcast); JP: October 7, 2004 (PlayStation 2)
- Light novel
- Written by: Okada Runa
- Illustrated by: Bekkankō
- Published by: Harvest
- Original run: March 25, 2004 – May 25, 2004
- Volumes: 3
- Anime television series
- Directed by: Shōsei Jinno
- Produced by: Tsuneo Takechi; Asuka Yamazaki; Makoto Nakamura; Toshio Hatanaka; Takashi Mizukami; Hiroshi Nomura; Tomoko Takayama
- Written by: Mitsuhiro Tōgō
- Music by: Akifumi Tada
- Studio: Radix Ace Entertainment
- Original network: AT-X
- Original run: June 30, 2004 – September 22, 2004
- Episodes: 13
- Original video animation

Operation Sanctuary+
- Directed by: Shōsei Jinno
- Written by: Mitsuhiro Tōgō
- Music by: Akifumi Tada
- Studio: Radix Ace Entertainment
- Released: December 12, 2004
- Runtime: 12 minutes each
- Episodes: 4
- Light novel

Tōhonseisō School Life
- Written by: Kano Kiichi
- Illustrated by: Bekkankō
- Published by: Gakken
- Published: December 25, 2004
- Volumes: 1
- Manga
- Written by: Takeda Mika
- Published by: ASCII Media Works
- Magazine: Dengeki G's Magazine
- Published: January 27, 2005
- Volumes: 1

Operation Sanctuary, known in Japan as Tsuki wa Higashi ni Hi wa Nishi ni (月は東に日は西に; lit. The Moon in the East, The Sun in the West) or Hani Hani (はにはに) for short, is a Japanese adult visual novel developed by August. It was released on July 20, 2003, for Windows using the NScripter engine. The Dreamcast and PlayStation 2 versions were released by Alchemist in 2004. An anime adaptation was broadcast in Japan in 2004, and originally ran from June 30, to September 22.The title references a haiku by Yosa Buson: "Nanohana ya tsuki wa higashi ni hi wa nishi ni."

ASCII Media Works published a manga adaptation for on January 27, 2005, serialized in Dengeki G's Magazine. Multiple light novels based on the game have also been published. Geneon Universal has produced several drama CDs.

== Plot ==
Naoki Kazumi is a boy whose parents died in an accident five years ago, and his memory went along with it. Since he had nowhere else to go, he lives with his cousin Matsuri Shibugaki and her parents. Every morning before school, he is awakened by his childhood friend, Honami Fujieda, who keeps telling him that he is not a child anymore, but still comes to wake him up. These usual, ordinary days seem to stretch on forever, until one day up on the school's rooftop, while Naoki is taking a peaceful nap, out of nowhere, a girl falls out of the sky. This girl, called Mikoto Amagasaki, comes from 100 years in the future, and she went back in time with the intention of finding her brother. When Mikoto sees Naoki, she mistakes him for her brother.

== Characters ==
=== Main ===
Naoki Kuzumi
Voiced by: Hikaru Midorikawa
The protagonist. He lost his parents and memory in an accident five years ago. He has living with his cousin Matsuri and her parents since the accident.
Mikoto Amagasaki
Voiced by: Junko Kusayanagi
A girl who falls from the sky. Naoki thinks that her appearance in that manner was a day dream. Mikoto is from 100 years in the future and went back in time searching for her brother.
Honami Fujieda
Voiced by: Rie Kanda
Naoki's childhood friend. She has taken care of him since before the loss of his parents and memory.
Matsuri Shibugaki
Voiced by: Yuuki Kajita
Naoki's cousin. She is quite close to Chihiro.
Chihiro Tachibana
Voiced by: Hitomi
Matsuri's best friend and classmate. She is the lone member of the garden club.
Yui Nonohara
Voiced by: Yuka Inokuchi
Naoki's homeroom teacher. The students love her in part because she is so short. Yui, like Mikoto, is from the future.
Kyouko Nishina
Voiced by: Yukiko Iwai
The school nurse. She is Yui's best friend and also comes from the future.

=== Supporting ===
Fumio Akiyama
Voiced by: Kanoko Hatamiya
Naoki's class representative. She is also a superintendent of the student dormitory.
Yusuke Amagasaki
Mikoto's brother who went back in time and happens to look much like Naoki.
Koji Hirose
Voiced by: Hiroki Takahashi
Naoki's best friend. He plans to reform the astronomy club that Naoki belongs to.
Yuka Hirose
Koji's younger sister.
Genzou Shibugaki
Matsuri's father. He works at a trading company and is very busy. Naoki calls him "Oyaji (Dad)".
Eri Shibugaki
Matsuri's mother. She works at the same company as her husband and is likewise very busy. Naoki calls her "Eri-san".
Jun'ichi Fukano
Mathematics teacher. He is strict with his students but truly cares for their well-being.
Rei Usami
Chief director of the school. The students rarely see her. She is also from the future.

== Adaptations ==
=== Printed media ===
A manga for Tsuki wa Higashi ni Hi wa Nishi ni, illustrated by Takeda Mika, began serialization in Dengeki G's Magazine on January 27, 2005. The manga was published by ASCII Media Works, and Dengeki Comics. Only one volume was published. An anthology comic consisting of four panel comic strips, has also been publicized, published under and issued by Majiku Comics (Enterbrain) on January 29, 2004. A novel series for Tsuki wa Higashi ni Hi wa Nishi ni was written by Okada Runa and published by Harvest. The first volume was published on March 25, 2004, and volume two and three were published on April 25, 2004, and May 25, 2004. A light novel called Tsuki wa Higashi ni Hi wa Nishi ni: Tōhonseisō School Life was published by Gakken on December 25, 2004, and written by Kano Kiichi. The light novel contains a short stories collection featuring the heroines. It was serialized in the Megami Magazine.

=== Drama CDs ===
Several drama CDs based on the game have been produced by Geneon Universal. Tsuki wa Higashi ni Hi wa Nishi ni's first drama CD was released on February 25, 2004. A second drama CD was released on April 23, 2004, entitled Tsuki wa Higashi ni Hi wa Nishi ni - Groovin' White Vacation. The first volume of another drama CD was released on October 22, 2004, the second volume was later released on November 25, 2004. The third volume was released on December 22, in the same year.

=== Anime ===
An anime adaptation was produced by Radix Ace Entertainment, and directed by Mitsuhiro Tōgō and Shousei Jinno. The anime was based on Honami scenario of PC version, and contained twelve episodes and a special episode which mainly aired on Japanese Association of Independent Television Stations between June and September 2004. Four DVDs were released between October 22 and December 12, 2004, and additional four episodes based on Mikoto scenario were contained in volume four.

==== Episode list ====
No.	Title	Original release date
1	"Girl who Came down from the Sky" "Sora kara Maiorita Shōjo" (空から舞い降りた少女)	June 30, 2004
For Naoki, it seems the same, typical day, his childhood friend Honami Fujieda wakes him up for school as usual, and they advance to school. All is normal, until when he takes a nap on the school rooftop, and out of the blue, a girl falls out of the sky, and embraces him. Naoki dismisses the obscene occurrence as a day dream. This girl later introduces herself to the class as Mikoto Amagasaki, and she thanks Naoki for taking her to the health centre.
2	"Hunch of Pleasant School Life" "Tanoshii Gakuen Seikatsu no Yokan" (楽しい学園生活の予感)	July 7, 2004
The episode starts with Naoki having a bad dream, and then waking up from it. He feels somewhat relieved when Honami comes to wake him up as usual, who is surprised when he suddenly hugs her. They both go to school, where they talk about starting an astronomy club with their friends. Naoki delivers coffee beans to Kyouko Nishina, the school nurse. She invites him to have a cup of coffee, and he reluctantly accepts. Afterwards she takes him to a secret place no students know about.
3	"Physical Examination with a Pounding Heart" "Dokidoki Shintai Kensa" (ドキドキ身体検査)	July 14, 2004
In school, it is the day for physical examination. The representatives are selected for the class, and Naoki recommends Honami.
4	"Run, Marupin!" "Hashire, Marupin!" (走れ、まるぴん!)	July 21, 2004
Naoki goes to the beach with Kyouko and Yui Nonohara, his homeroom teacher. Somehow, Naoki makes it back in time to the party Mikoto and the others prepared.
5	"Happy Birthday" "Happī Bāsudē" (ハッピーバースデー)	July 25, 2004
Honami tells Naoki that it is Mikoto's birthday is on the last day of tests, and everyone decides to throw a surprise party.
6	"Bicycle of Love" "Koi no Baishikuru" (恋のバイシクル)	August 4, 2004
Naoki teaches Chihiro how to ride a bicycle.
7	"Brother & Sister" "Burazā & Shistā" (ブラザー＆シスター)	August 11, 2004
Naoki has another bad dream, and is woken up by his cousin Matsuri. At school, Naoki and the rest have swimming class.
8	"The Night of Each Other" "Sorezore no Yoru" (それぞれの夜)	August 18, 2004
Over summer vacation, the gang are on an observation of Perseids meteors, in order to present a good observation report to Hasumi-sai.
9	"A Summer Festival" "Natsumatsuri" (夏祭り)	August 25, 2004
It is the summer festival, Naoki and Honami end up watching the fireworks together. Then suddenly, Naoki falls to the ground, to Honami's shock.
10	"Another Myself" "Mou Hitori no Jibun" (もう一人の自分)	September 1, 2004
Naoki continues to have bad dreams, and then waking up in his bed again. Naoki starts getting memory loss and he collapses in school. He is taken to the nurse's office.
11	"Go beyond Time and Space" "Jikū wo Koete" (時空を超えて)	September 8, 2004
The truth about Mikoto is revealed.
12	"The Moon in the East, The Sun in the West" "Tsuki wa Higashi ni Hi wa Nishi ni" (月は東に日は西に)	September 15, 2004
In the end, Naoki and Honami get married.
13	"School Life Running around Everywhere (Special Episode)" "Tōhonseisō Sukūru Raifu (Tokubetsu hen)" (東奔西走スクールライフ(特別編))	September 22, 2004
A summary of the story and characters.
9' (OVA)	"Loneliness" "Ronrinesu" (ロンリネス)	December 12, 2004
10' (OVA)	"Dream and Fact" "Yume to Genjitsu" (夢と現実)	December 12, 2004
11' (OVA)	"Memories" "Kioku" (記憶)	December 12, 2004
12' (OVA)	"Operation Sanctuary" "Operēshon Sankuchuarī" (Operation Sanctuary)	December 12, 2004

== Staff ==
=== Game ===
- Character design: Bekkanko
- Scenario: Taku Sakakibara, Hiroyuki Uchida, Hideaki Anzai
- Music: LOOPCUBE
  - Opening: divergent flow
    Lyrics: H/de.
    Music: Hiroki
    Vocal: Mayu
  - Ending: Asu no Omoide (Memories of Tomorrow)
    Lyrics: H/de.
    Music: Hiroki
    Vocal: Mayu

=== Anime ===
- General director: Mitsuhiro Tōgō
- Director: Shouji Jinno
- Character design: Norikatsu Nakano
- General key animation director: Norikatsu Nakano
- Art director: Shinji Katahira
- Scenario: Kazuharu Satō, Tsutomu Kaneko
- Music: Akifumi Tada
  - Opening: amulet
    Lyrics: a.k.a.dRESS
    Music: a.k.a.dRESS
    Vocal: Mayumi Iizuka
- Animation production: Radix
