= Princess Lover! =

Japanese visual novel

- Princess Lover! visual novel cover

プリンセスラバー! (Purinsesu Rabaa!)
- Video game
- Developer: Ricotta
- Publisher: Ricotta (Windows); Comfort (PS2)
- Genre: Eroge, Visual novel
- Platform: Windows, PlayStation 2
- Released: June 27, 2008 (Windows); January 28, 2010 (PS2)
- Manga
- Written by: Ricotta
- Illustrated by: Naoha Yuigi
- Published by: Media Factory
- Magazine: Media Factory Mobile!
- Original run: March 20, 2009 – 2009
- Volumes: 1
- Anime television series
- Directed by: Hiromitsu Kanazawa
- Produced by: Masanobu Arakawa; Mika Nomura; Tatsuhiro Nitta; Yuka Sakurai
- Written by: Makoto Nakamura
- Studio: GoHands
- Original network: Chiba TV, tvk, CTV, Tokyo MX, Sun TV, AT-X, TV Saitama
- Original run: July 5, 2009 – September 20, 2009
- Episodes: 12
- Manga

Princess Lover! Pure My Heart
- Written by: Ricotta
- Illustrated by: Yū Midorigi
- Published by: Kill Time Communication
- Magazine: Comic Valkyrie
- Original run: July 27, 2009 – November 27, 2010
- Volumes: 1
- Manga

Princess Lover! Eternal Love For My Lady
- Written by: COMFORT
- Illustrated by: Shu
- Published by: ASCII Media Works
- Magazine: Dengeki Moeo
- Original run: August 26, 2009 – August 26, 2010
- Volumes: 1
- Original video animation
- Directed by: Manaka Toyota
- Produced by: Futanari Satoshikun
- Written by: Riyūji Hatsumi
- Music by: Akira Asano
- Studio: Public Enemies
- Released: September 17, 2010 – October 22, 2010
- Runtime: 30 minutes
- Episodes: 2
- icon

Princess Lover! (プリンセスラバー!, Purinsesu Rabā!) is a Japanese visual novel and the first title developed by Ricotta. It was first released as an eroge for Microsoft Windows on June 27, 2008, in both limited and regular editions, which was followed by an all-ages release for the PlayStation 2 on January 28, 2010. The gameplay in Princess Lover! follows a linear plot line which offers pre-determined scenarios and courses of interaction, and its story focuses on the appeal of the four female main characters.

Princess Lover! has received several transitions to other media. The game was first adapted into three light novels written by Utsusemi and illustrated by Hyūma Kitsuhi. It was then followed by two manga adaptations: the first, illustrated by Naoha Yuigi, began serialization in Media Factory's Media Factory Mobile! service on March 20, 2009; and the second, illustrated by Yū Midorigi, began its serialization in the manga magazine Comic Valkyrie on July 27, 2009. An anime adaptation produced by the animation studio GoHands also began its broadcast in Japan on July 5, 2009, and it was later followed by other networks in the same month. An Internet radio show has also been produced to promote the anime adaptation, and began its broadcast on July 3, 2009. A two-part adult OVA series was released in late 2010.

== Gameplay ==
A conversation in Princess Lover! depicting the protagonist Teppei talking to Yū.

The gameplay in Princess Lover! requires little interaction from the player, as most of the duration of the game is only spent on reading the text that appears on the lower portion of the screen, representing either dialogue between characters, or the inner thoughts of the protagonist. Every so often, the player will come to a "decision point", where he or she is given the chance to choose from multiple options. The time between these points varies and can occur anywhere from a minute to much longer. Text progression pauses at these points and depending on the choices that the player makes, the plot will progress in a specific direction. There are four main plot lines in the game that the player will have the chance to experience, one for each of the heroines in the story. To view all of the plot lines, the player will have to replay the game multiple times and make different decisions to progress the plot in an alternate direction.

== Plot ==
Arima Teppei lost his parents in a traffic accident. His grandfather Isshin adopted him and ordered him to succeed the head of Arima Group Corporation. At Shuuhou Gakuen, a high school only for wealthy students, Teppei's new life as a celebrity starts.

== Characters ==
=== Main characters ===
Teppei Arima (有馬 哲平, Arima Teppei)
Voiced by: Takuma Terashima (anime, PS2 game) / Akira Ishida (OVA)
The main protagonist. Prior to the series, Teppei grew up in a happy family with his mother and father, a noodle shop owner. Coming back from school one day he learns that his parents were killed in an automobile accident. He is then picked up by his grandfather, Isshin Arima, who is the owner of the Arima Financial Combine, a very wealthy and perhaps the most powerful industrial group in Japan. Isshin then adopts Teppei with the aim of making him the successor to the Arima corporation (in place of his now-deceased daughter and Teppei's mother) and Teppei is enrolled in the most prestigious private school in Japan. He is a good swordsman and excels at quick drawing techniques.
Charlotte Hazelrink (シャルロット・ヘイゼルリンク, Sharotto Heizerurinku)
Voiced by: Kazane (Windows game) / Ryōka Yuzuki (anime) / Aya Endō (PS2 game)
One of the four main heroines of the series, Charlotte is the princess of the fictional Hazelrink Principality. She and Teppei first meet when he saves her from some thugs. She likes to tease Teppei and has a cheery nature.
Aside from this, she is in love with Teppei and, in the anime, even asks Teppei to not forget about her. She also has very big breasts which attract Teppei's attention. She is a childhood friend of Sylvia van Hossen and is a little jealous of Sylvia for being named as Teppei's fiancée. She has a butler who is very protective of her and who will often go to great lengths to protect her. She also has a fiancée in the anime; despite this she does not want to give up on Teppei.
Sylvia van Hossen (シルヴィア・ファン・ホッセン, Shiruvia Fan Hossen)
Voiced by: Suzune Kusunoki (Windows game, OVA) / Megumi Toyoguchi (anime) / Erika Harumi (PS2 game)
One of the four main heroines of the series, Sylvie is a noble of the fictional Flemish Principality of Eastern Europe. While she grew up in Flemish, she has not spent much of her mature life in that nation and attends school in Japan. She is the elder of the two daughters of Vincent van Hossen, the head of the van Hossen family and is very skilled in fencing. She first meets Teppei when they spar in the garden during a party. Both of them are surprised when they are told that their marriage has been arranged. When they next sparred, Sylvia won the showdown by the merest fraction of a second. She is a bit reserved but enjoys her bouts with Teppei and is trying to understand him as a friend first, before they are married. Maria, her younger sister, wants her to marry Teppei. Sylvia is the best friend of Charlotte, the Princess of Hazelrink. She is also the captain of the Flemish military unit called the Horse Riders. She is a hard woman with high standards and initially has a tendency to be outwardly repulsed by Teppei. She has difficulty expressing her feelings around him and is better with actions than words. She loved her late mother very dearly but was unable to cry at her funeral. Her feelings for Teppei are similar to those she has for her mother's memory. In the 9th episode she admits to Seika that she could not understand her feelings towards Teppei and in the 11th episode shows her true feelings to Teppei with a kiss.
In the game her route concludes with Teppei and Sylvia getting married and Sylvia pregnant with Teppei's baby. The game ends with her saying she is extremely happy and thanking Teppei for everything.
Seika Hōjōin (鳳条院 聖華, Hōjōin Seika)
Voiced by: Fūri Samoto (Windows game) / Emiri Katō (anime) / Eri Kitamura (PS2 game)
The daughter of the Hōjōin family whose company are rivals to Arima. Although she is initially neutral towards Teppei, once she finds out he is an Arima, she immediately dislikes him due to her family's longstanding antipathy for Teppei's grandfather (Many years previously, Teppei's grandfather was a workaholic and his lonely grandmother had an affair with Seika's grandfather which resulted in Isshin throwing his wife out of their house and his cutting ties with the Hōjōin. More recently, he refused to sell Seika's fashions in any of his group's stores). Seika has a loud and forthright nature. She is the 'Club Representative' of the 'Society Club' and reserves the right to limit membership to those students who satisfy her conditions to join the school's most elegant and exclusive club. Outside of school, she is a very popular model and one of the most gifted young fashion designers in all of Japan. Despite her initial dislike for Teppei, she falls in love with him due to his tenacious nature. However, she is uncertain how Teppei will react and is mostly quiet about it.
Yū Fujikura (藤倉 優, Fujikura Yū)
Voiced by: Ayaka Kimura (Windows game, OVA) / Yuki Matsuoka (anime) / Yuka Inokuchi (PS2 game)
A maid of the Arima household who sometimes councils Teppei. She had been in an orphanage from a very young age until Isshin Arima took her into his care and brought her up to be an admirable maid. She has sworn to serve the Arima family to show her gratitude. She feels privileged to have been assigned as the maid-in-charge of serving Teppei, the next heir to the Arima Group. In addition to her household duties, Yuu is also an expert at computers and is able to type and work at almost superhuman speed. She thinks of Isshin Arima as a parent and develops tender feelings for Teppei, but feels that she is too low in class to be with him. Of all the girls, she is the most tender and nurturing and Teppei compares Yuu to his mother.

=== Supporting characters ===
Isshin Arima (有馬 一心, Arima Isshin)
Voiced by: Kyōnosuke Hiruma (Windows game) / Norio Wakamoto (anime & PS2 game)
The owner of the wealthy Arima corporation and grandfather of Teppei. He adopts Teppei when his daughter (Teppei's mother) and son-in-law were killed. Having learned his lesson with his daughter, Isshin allows Teppei to do as he wishes within broad guidelines rather than what Isshin wants him to do so that Teppei does not run away like his mother did. Isshin has an excellent memory despite his advanced age and, not having been a part of his childhood, wants to get to know Teppei better. He was an entrepreneur during World War II and made his fortune in the aftermath of the war. His company extends into many areas including automotive and metal industries.
Kanae Kobayashi
Voiced by: Asako Dodo
Teppei's mother. She was the heir to the Arima Group Corporation before she died even though she had had little contact with her father for years prior to the story. She fell in love with Kobayashi, Isshin was inflexible. Due to her strong headed nature and despite her father's disapproval, she ran away and eloped.
Mr. Kobayashi
Voiced by: Kanemitsu Nobuaki
Teppei's father and a skilled swordsman but also a lazy man. The only thing that he feared was the wrath of his wife. He and Kanae died together. Teppei believes Kanae fell in love with his father because he and Isshin have similar personalities.
Maria van Hossen (マリア・ファン・ホッセン, Maria Fan Hossen)
Voiced by: Mio Ōkawa (Windows game, OVA) / Kaya Miyake (anime) / Maki Kobayashi (PS2 game)
The younger of the two van Hossen sisters. She is lovely and energetic. She loves her father Vincent and loves to cling to him all the time. She has called Teppei 'Onii-chan' since their first meeting because he is engaged to marry her elder sister Sylvia.
Vincent van Hossen (Binsento Fan Hossen)
Voiced by: Takehito Koyasu (anime & PS2 game)
The father of Maria and Sylvia. He is a respectable figure in society and a supporter of the Arima Group. Teppei's grandfather, Isshin Arima, places great trust in Vincent and thus he chose his daughter, Sylvia, to be Teppei's fiancée. Vincent is calm and collected no matter the situation.
Alfred (アルフレッド, Arufureddo)
Voiced by: Yosuke Akimoto (anime & PS2 game)
One of the butlers of the Hazelrink family. He has served Charlotte, Princess of Hazelrink since she was a baby and has sworn by his life to protect her. His devotion runs so deeply that he is overly protective of Charlotte. Alfred is a very good fist-fighter and an expert of martial arts. He is so vigorous that Teppei believes he will live to see 100. His name is a reference to Alfred Pennyworth, Bruce Wayne's butler from the Batman Series.

=== Others ===
Hartmann Bezelheim
Charlotte's fiance, Hartmann is also the most successful businessman in Charlotte's nation and one of the chief traders with the Arima company. In the anime, he serves as the primary villain. He hates Arima and wants to kill Teppei for vengeance. Despite his engagement to Charlotte, he is having an affair with Josephine. He wears glasses and has a tendency to make flashy entrances.
Josephine
The secretary of Charlotte's fiance. She is a busty red-haired woman who is absolutely loyal to Hartmann and jealous of Charlotte's position as Hartmann's future wife.
Ayano Kaneko (金子 綾乃, Kaneko Ayano)
Voiced by: Soyogi Tōno (Windows game) / Nozomi Sasaki (anime) / Tae Okajima (PS2 game)
One of the members of Seika Houjouin's posse. She is promoted to one of the main heroines in the sequel of the Princess Lover Series, Princess Lover! Eternal Love For My Lady.
Haruhiko Nezu (根津 晴彦, Nezu Haruhiko)
Voiced by: Ichigo Miruku (Windows game) / Minoru Shiraishi (anime & PS2 game)
A vain classmate of Teppei's. He has great respect for Teppei and calls him Teppei-sama.
Erika Takezono (竹園 エリカ, Takezono Erika)
Voiced by: Nazuna Gogyō (Windows game) / Kaoru Mizuhara (anime) / Ryōko Ono (PS2 game)
Another one of the members of Houjouin Seika's posse.
Mr. Todomura
He is from the Arima Group Commissions Department.

== Development ==
Princess Lover! is the first title developed by the visual novel developer Ricotta. The project is notable as the development team comprises a limited number of credited members. Scenario for the game was provided by Shōta Onoue who has previously worked on titles such as Tactics' Tenshi no Himegodo. Art direction and character designs were done by Kei Komori who is known for his work in various dōjin titles. Komori later went on to create Ricotta's second title Walkure Romanze: Shōjo Kishi Monogatari.

== Release history ==
Princess Lover! was first released to the public on June 27, 2008, as a limited edition collected in a DVD playable only on Microsoft Windows. The limited edition included the game itself, and it also included a maxi single entitled "Songs From Princess Lover!". It was later followed by an all-ages consumer console release published by Comfort and released for the PlayStation 2 on January 28, 2010. The PlayStation 2 version entitled Princess Lover!: Eternal Love For My Lady will contain remastered graphics, and additional scenarios for Ayano Kaneko, a supporting female character being promoted to a heroine.

== Adaptations ==
=== Books and publications ===
Princess Lover! was first adapted into a series of light novels written by Utsusemi and illustrated by Hyūma Kitsuhi. The first of the novels, titled Princess Lover! Silvia van Hossen's Romance (プリンセスラバー! シルヴィア＝ファン・ホッセンの恋路, Purinsesu Rabaa! Shiruvia Fan Hossen no Koiji), was released on November 29, 2008. The second of the novels, titled Princess Lover! Charlotte Hazelrink's Romance (プリンセスラバー! シャルロット＝ヘイゼルリンクの恋路, Purinsesu Rabaa! Sharurotto Heizerurinku no Koiji), was released on May 30, 2009. Both of these light novels were published by Kill Time Communication and released in regular and limited editions. The limited editions included the book itself and a telephone card; the second novel also received a version with a poster included instead. The regular editions of did not contain the aforementioned extras. A third light novel series, titled Princess Lover! Silvia van Hossen's Romance 2 and also written by Utsusemi and illustrated by Kitsuhi, began serialization in Kill Time Communication's Nijiken Dream Magazine on June 17, 2009.

A 135-page visual fan book for Princess Lover! was published by Max on December 2, 2008. The book contained illustrations and computer graphics used in the visual novel and various publications, introduction and explanations of the story and characters, production design and sketches, and interview with the development team, and also a short story entitled "Little Princess!"

=== Manga ===
There have been three manga adaptations based on Princess Lover! The first manga series was illustrated by Japanese manga artist Naoha Yuigi, and it was first serialized on Media Factory's Media Factory Mobile! service for mobile phones on March 20, 2009. A second manga series, Princess Lover! Pure My Heart, was also serialized in Kill Time Communication's Comic Valkyrie. The manga, which began serialization while the first was still ongoing, was illustrated by Yū Midorigi and received assistance from Utsusemi, the author of the light novel adaptations. The third manga, Princess Lover! Eternal Love For My Lady illustrated by Shu, was serialized in ASCII Media Works's Dengeki Moeo magazine from October 2009 to October 2010 issues. The three manga were collected in one volume each.

=== Anime ===
The anime adaptation of Princess Lover! was first formally announced in March 2009 via its official website. The anime was produced by GoHands as the animation studio's first production, and it was directed by Hiromitsu Kanazawa and written by Makoto Nakamura. It was first exhibited as a video in a public showing in Akihabara on June 21, 2009, and again at Television Kanagawa's Tvk Anime Matsuri 2009 exhibition in Nippon Seinenkan in Shinjuku, on June 27, 2009. Both events featured a public showing of the anime's first episode along with Umineko no Naku Koro ni, in addition to various other anime for the Tvk Anime Matsuri event. The anime began its televised broadcast in Japan on July 5, 2009, on the Chiba TV and TV Kanagawa broadcasting networks, ending on September 20, 2009. They also released an uncensored version in the webcast section.

In May 2021, Princess Lover! was one of five anime titles (along with KonoSuba, That Time I Got Reincarnated as a Slime, Zombie Land Saga, and Nekopara) that were given a limited ban by the Russian government for their depiction of reincarnation.

=== OVA ===
On September 24, 2010, a 2-part Princess Lover! adult OVA was animated by Hoods Entertainment under the name Public Enemies. It features Sylvia as the main heroine and contains an original story with various erotic scenes. It was released on DVD by the adult anime label.
