= Mashiroiro Symphony =

2009 video game and media franchise

- Mashiroiro Symphony visual novel cover

ましろ色シンフォニー (Mashiroiro Shinfonī)
- Genre: Drama, Harem, Romance
- Video game
- Developer: Palette (PC)HuneX (PSP)
- Publisher: Palette (PC); Comfort (PSP), Shiravune (PC)
- Genre: Eroge, Visual novel
- Platform: PC, PSP
- Released: October 30, 2009 (PC)
- Manga
- Written by: Palette
- Illustrated by: Futago Minazuki
- Published by: Kadokawa Shoten
- Magazine: Comp Ace
- Original run: November 2009 – October 2010
- Volumes: 2
- Manga

Mashiroiro Symphony: Wind of Silk
- Written by: Palette
- Illustrated by: Futago Minazuki
- Published by: Kadokawa Shoten
- Magazine: Comp Ace
- Original run: April 2011 – September 2011
- Volumes: 1
- Manga

Mashiroiro Symphony: Twinkle Moon
- Written by: Palette
- Illustrated by: Futago Minazuki
- Published by: Kadokawa Shoten
- Magazine: Comp Ace
- Original run: October 2011 – January 2012
- Volumes: 1
- Anime television series

Mashiroiro Symphony: The Color of Lovers
- Directed by: Eiji Suganuma
- Produced by: Shinsaku Tanaka; Satoshi Fukao; Yūka Sakurai; Toshio Okada
- Written by: Team Rikka
- Music by: Akito Matsuda (Note: Credited under the pseudonym Nijine.)
- Studio: Manglobe
- Licensed by: NA: Sentai Filmworks
- Original network: TV Aichi, AT-X
- English network: US: Anime Network
- Original run: October 5, 2011 – December 21, 2011
- Episodes: 12 + OVA

Mashiroiro Symphony: Love is pure white (ましろ色シンフォニー -Love is pure white-, Mashiroiro Shinfonī -Love is pure white-; lit. Pure White Symphony: Love is pure white) is a Japanese adult visual novel developed by Palette, and it was released in Japan on October 30, 2009, for Microsoft Windows PCs. Mashiroiro Symphony is Palette's ninth title. The gameplay in Mashiroiro Symphony follows a linear plot line, which offers pre-determined scenarios and differs upon the player's decisions, and its storyline focuses on the appeal of the four female main characters. Futago Minazuki has illustrated three manga adaptations serialized in Kadokawa Shoten's Comp Ace magazine. Four drama CD adaptations titled Mashiroiro Symphony Original Drama CD Series were released by Lantis in 2010. A 12-episode anime adaptation produced by Manglobe aired in Japan between October and December 2011.

== Gameplay ==
A conversation in Mashiroiro Symphony depicting the protagonist Shingo talking to Airi and Sakuno

The gameplay in Mashiroiro Symphony requires little interaction from the player, as most of the duration of the game is only spent on reading the text that appears on the lower portion of the screen, representing either dialogue between characters, or the inner thoughts of the protagonist. Every so often, the player will come to a "decision point", where they are given the chance to choose from multiple options. The time between these points varies and can occur anywhere from a minute to much longer. Text progression pauses at these points and depending on the choices that the player makes, the plot will progress in a specific direction. There are four main plot lines in the original release that the player will have the chance to experience, one for each of the heroines in the story. This is increased to six plot lines in the PlayStation Portable version with the extended scenario for two female characters. To view all of the plot lines, the player will have to replay the game multiple times and make different decisions to progress the plot in an alternate direction. The PC-only Sana Edition contains only a single heroine's plot which is taken from the PlayStation Portable version's extended scenario and expanded further with new scenes and CGs.

== Plot ==
The story of Mashiroiro Symphony primarily takes place in the fictional town of Kagamidai (各務台), which consists of two distinct districts dubbed the "Old District" (旧市街, Kyū-shigai), which primarily contains traditional housings resided by upper class families, and the "New District" (新市街, Shin-shigai), which is generally inhabited by working class families. The town also houses two private academic institutions undergoing a merger: the Yuihime Girls' Private Academy (私立結姫女子学園, Shiritsu Yuihime Joshi Gakuen), a notorious upper-class girls' academy nicknamed Yuijo (結女), and the Kagamidai Private Academy (私立各務台学園, Shiritsu Kagamidai Gakuen), a coeducation school which Shingo, the protagonist whose role the player assumes, attends. As part of the merger, students from both schools are selected to participate in a test class at the Yuihime Girls' Academy campus, an act which is initially opposed by the female student body.

== Characters ==
=== Main characters ===
Shingo Uryū (瓜生 新吾, Uryū Shingo)
Voiced by: Takahiro Mizushima (Drama CD/anime)
Shingo is the main protagonist and is a second-year student of Kagamidai Academy. He is very hardworking and kind. He was selected as a test student, and transferred to Yuihime Girls' Academy to participate in 2-T, the second-year test class. He was elected the class representative. He quickly makes friends with several girls at Yuihime Girls' Academy, though Airi does not want to get along with him or any of the other boys. He was sickly and asthmatic in his childhood, but he is in good health now. His parents are busy with their work and are seldom at home.

Airi Sena (瀬名 愛理, Sena Airi)
Voiced by: Nazuna Gogyō (PC), Ryōko Ono (Drama CD/PSP/anime)
Airi is a second-year student of Yuihime Girls' Academy and the principal's daughter. She always gets the best grades among all second-year students. At first, she was against the plan for merging of the schools, and rejected male students from Kagamidai Academy, but she began getting along with them several weeks later. She was elected the class representative along with Shingo. She was born and brought up in an upper class family in the Old District, but she has lived by herself in a low-priced apartment in the New District since she started attending Yuihime Girls' Academy. She lives in a simple life and often goes shopping to a local supermarket in the New District named Kume Mart to buy reasonable-priced food and daily necessities.

Sakuno Uryū (瓜生 桜乃, Uryū Sakuno)
Voiced by: Oto Agumi (PC), Mai Gotō (Drama CD/PSP/anime)
Sakuno is Shingo's younger stepsister and first-year student of Kagamidai Academy; her father married Shingo's mother about ten years ago. She has a quiet personality and is good at cooking, but has a poor sense of direction and often gets lost. She was selected as a test student with her brother, and transferred to Yuihime Girls' Academy to participate in 1-T, the first-year test class. She happened to meet Airi at night on September 30, the day before the transferring on October 1. She became close friends with Airi at that time. She often goes shopping to Kume Mart, too. She is youngest but tallest among the main female characters.

Angelina Nanatsu Sewell (アンジェリーナ・菜夏・シーウェル, Anjerīna Nanatsu Shīweru)
Voiced by: Miru (PC), Oma Ichimura (Drama CD/PSP/anime)
Angelina, nicknamed Ange (アンジェ, Anje), is a second-year student of Yuihime Girls' Academy. Unlike other female students, she does not wear school uniform, but always wears a maid costume. She is a "stray maid" (野良メイド, nora meido) and hopes to meet her future master someday. She is in Shingo's class and tries to help the students from Kagamidai Academy assimilate. Her father is Japanese and her mother is British, but she speaks only Japanese because she was born and brought up in Japan. She has a cheerful personality and is very good at housekeeping tasks such as cooking and cleaning, but is weak at general educational subjects such as English and mathematics. Her favorite food is tokoroten. She later becomes Shingo's maid, and refers to him as "master" (旦那さま, danna-sama) (in her storyline of the game and, temporarily, in the fifth episode of the anime).

Miu Amaha (天羽 みう, Amaha Miu)
Voiced by: Risa Matsuda (PC), Noriko Rikimaru (Drama CD/PSP/anime)
Miu is a third-year student of Yuihime Girls' Academy. She lives in a house nearby the school with her mother and two cats. She is the founder and president of the Nuko Club (ぬこ部, nukobu), a school club whose purpose is to care for injured wild animals and then return them to the wild. She works part-time at a maid café named Dolce to earn money for club activities; as the Nuko Club is not an official club, the club's budget is not supplied by the school. She is very kind to Shingo and becomes fond of him. She is eldest but shortest among the main characters.

Sana Inui (乾 紗凪, Inui Sana)
Voiced by: Misono Moriya (PC), Mayumi Yoshida (Drama CD/PSP/anime)
Sana is a second-year student of Yuihime Girls' Academy and Airi's childhood friend. Although a supporting character in the PC game version, she is a main character in the PSP game version, as the result of taking first place in a favorite character poll of the game. She likes Miu very much and is in the Nuko Club because of her. Although she does not like boys, she makes an effort to makes the male students from Kagamidai Academy feel welcome, but she later reverts to her true self. She dislikes Shingo especially and often calls him "kuzu-mushi" (クズムシ; lit. "trash worm"). This is exacerbated when she notes the growing closeness between Shingo and Miu. In the anime and Miu's route in the game, Sana develops feelings for Shingo herself, but is heartbroken when Shingo and Miu start dating since she realizes that if she had been nicer to him, he might have chosen her. In her own route, Sana finally realized about her own feelings for Shingo and she was jealous of Miu because Shingo being kind to her (even though she already knew that Shingo was kind to everyone). Sana had a toy ring as a memento from her late mother.

Yutsuki Onomiya (小野宮 結月, Onomiya Yutsuki)
Voiced by: Hiroko Taguchi (PSP/anime)
Yutsuki is a new female character included in the PSP game version. She is a second-year student of Yuihime Girls' Academy, but is not in Shingo's class. She is in the drama club. She is good at cooking but not good at cleaning. She lives in a shrine with her parents and grandmother. In the anime, she appears in the last episode.

=== Others ===
Hayata Mukunashi (椋梨 隼太, Mukunashi Hayata)
Voiced by: Omame (PC), Tatsuhisa Suzuki (Drama CD/PSP/anime)
Hayata is a second-year male student of Kagamidai Academy and Shingo's good friend. He is Kagamidai Academy's student council president. He also transferred to Yuihime Girls' Academy to participate in 2-T. He acts as the vice-president at Yuihime Girls' Academy's student council. He has a fiancée.

Ranka Sena (瀬名 蘭華, Sena Ranka)
Voiced by: Kazane (PC), Harumi Sakurai (Drama CD/PSP/anime)
Ranka is Airi's mother and the principal of Yuihime Girls' Academy. She is very popular among her students. She got a divorce from her husband more than ten years ago.

Machi Yatsuzuka (八塚 万智, Yatsuzuka Machi)
Voiced by: Rino Kawashima (PC), Kei Mizusawa (Drama CD/PSP/anime)
Machi is a female teacher who teaches Japanese at Yuihime Girls' Academy. She is the homeroom teacher of Shingo's class, 2-T; Airi, Angelina, Sana and Hayata are also in the same class. She is shy and is not good at talking with young men, but she actually likes boys' love. She is a 29-year-old single woman and wants to get married as soon as possible. She becomes the adviser for the Nuko Club (in Miu's storyline of the game and the seventh episode of the anime).

Yuiko Amaha (天羽 結子, Amaha Yuiko)
Voiced by: Fūri Samoto (PC), Michiru Yuimoto (Drama CD/PSP/anime)
Yuiko is Miu's mother. She often gets mistaken for Miu's older sister due to her young appearance. She is a graduate of Yuihime Girls' Academy, and Ranka's friend. She has two cats named Domon and Karin inside the house. Her husband lives in a distant town on business.

Eleanor Sewell (エレノア・シーウェル, Erenoa Shīweru)
Voiced by: Akane Tomonaga (Drama CD)
Eleanor is Angelina's mother from Britain, who lives in Britain with her husband. She is a graduate of Yuihime Girls' Academy, too. She appears in the third drama CD volume.

Setsu Onomiya (小野宮 セツ, Onomiya Setsu)
Voiced by: Ikuko Tani (PSP)
Setsu is Yutsuki's grandmother. She is a new character included in the PSP game version.

Rio Inui (乾 理央, Inui Rio)
Voiced by: Mami Fujita (PSP)
Rio is Sana's younger brother, who is too young to attend school. He is a new character included in the PSP game version and Sana Edition. He is the reason why Sana dislikes boys (Rio also hates girls because of his sister). Rio also usually calls Sana by the nickname that Sana often uses when she calls Shingo. It later revealed that Rio actually cared about his older sister (Sana also cared about her younger brother).

Pannya (ぱんにゃ)
Voiced by: Kazane (PC), Harumi Sakurai (Drama CD/PSP/anime)
Pannya is a strange, female cat-like creature that lives on the campus of Yuihime Girls' Academy. She is close to Miu. Her name "Pannya" comes from "panda" and "nyanko" ("kitty" in Japanese).

== Development ==
Mashiroiro Symphony's illustration which was first introduced on August 15, 2008

Mashiroiro Symphony is the ninth title developed by the visual novel developer Palette, after their previous titles such as Moshimo Ashita ga Hare Naraba and Sakura Strasse. Mashiroiro Symphony's scenario was written by three people: Hozumi K, who wrote Airi and Angelina's storylines; Hare Kitagawa, who has previously worked on Minori's Haru no Ashioto, provided Sakuno's storyline; and Orgel, who provided Miu and Sana's storyline. Character design and art direction for the game was split among three people: Tsubasu Izumi, who worked on Feng's Akaneiro ni Somaru Saka, provided character designs for female characters; Tamahiyo provided designs for two male characters, Shingo Uryū and Hayata Mukunashi; and Nagomi Tozakura provided super deformed illustrations. Mashiroiro Symphony's music was solely composed by Burton, who provided music for Sakura Strasse. Tsubasu Izumi and Burton also work on Palette's thirteenth title Koi ga Saku Koro Sakura Doki, which was released on June 27, 2014.

Mashiroiro Symphony was first released for Microsoft Windows PCs on October 30, 2009. An all-ages edition developed by HuneX and published by Comfort playable on the PlayStation Portable (PSP), titled Mashiroiro Symphony: *mutsu no Hana, was released on June 30, 2011.

== Adaptations ==
=== Manga ===
Mashiroiro Symphony received three manga adaptations illustrated by Japanese illustrator Futago Minazuki, which were serialized in the manga magazine Comp Ace. The first manga adaptation, which covers Airi Sena, was serialized between the November 2009 and October 2010 issues, published on September 26, 2009, and August 26, 2010, respectively. The twelve individual chapters were later collected into two tankōbon volumes published by Kadokawa Shoten on April 26, 2010, and September 25, 2010. A second manga adaptation illustrated by Minazuki titled Mashiroiro Symphony: Wind of Silk (ましろ色シンフォニー -Wind of silk-), which covers Sana Inui, was serialized between the April and September 2011 issues of Comp Ace. Six chapters were collected into a single volume released on August 26, 2011. A third manga illustrated by Minazuki titled Mashiroiro Symphony: Twinkle Moon (ましろ色シンフォニー -Twinkle moon-), which covers Yutsuki Onomiya, was serialized between the October 2011 and January 2012 issues of Comp Ace. Four chapters were collected into a single volume released on December 26, 2011. A manga anthology illustrated by various artists titled Magi-Cu 4-koma Mashiroiro Symphony was released by Enterbrain on March 25, 2010.

=== Drama CDs ===
Lantis released four drama CDs titled collectively as the Mashiroiro Symphony Original Drama CD Series, one for each heroine. Airi's CD, titled Dotera, Mō Icchaku (どてら、もう一着), was released on July 21, 2010. Sakuno's CD, titled Nichiyōbi ni wa Te o Tsunaide (にちようびには手をつないで), was released on August 25, 2010. Angelina's CD, titled Tenshi ni wa Shukufuku no Mabushisa o (天使には祝福のまぶしさを), was released on September 22, 2010. Lastly, Miu's CD, titled Haru wa Omochi no Yakegoro (春はお餅のやけごろ), was released on October 27, 2010.

=== Internet radio show ===
An Internet radio show to promote the anime series titled Nuko-Radi! Nukumori ga Koishiku Naru Radio (ぬこラジ!〜ぬくもりが恋しくなるラジオ〜) began airing on October 4, 2011. The show is produced by Lantis Web Radio and is streamed biweekly. It is hosted by Takahiro Mizushima and Ryōko Ono, the voices of Shingo and Airi in the anime, respectively. The opening theme is "Niji no Asa ni" (虹の朝に) by Choucho, and the ending theme is "Suisai Candy" (水彩キャンディー) by Marble.

=== Anime ===
A 12-episode anime television series adaptation produced by Manglobe and directed by Eiji Suganuma titled Mashiroiro Symphony: The Color of Lovers (ましろ色シンフォニー -The color of lovers-) aired between October 5 and December 21, 2011, on TV Aichi. The story is based on Miu's route of the game, but also includes parts of other routes as well. The screenplay was written by Team Rikka, and the chief animation director Toshie Kawamura based the character design used in the anime on Tsubasu Izumi's and Tamahiyo's original concepts. The music was produced by Nijine, and the sound director is Satoshi Yano. The series was released on six Blu-ray Disc (BD) and DVD compilation volumes between January 25 and June 27, 2012. This series was streamed online with English-subtitles by Crunchyroll and the Anime Network. Sentai Filmworks has licensed the series in North America and released the series with on DVD with English subtitles on December 4, 2012.

| No. | Title | Original release date |
|---|---|---|
| 1 | "White-Colored Meeting" "Mashiro-iro no Deai" (ましろ色の出会い) | October 5, 2011 |
While returning home from the local mall, Sakuno Uryū gets lost and calls her older brother, Shingo, to come find her just before her battery goes dead. It begins to rain and Sakuno gets help from a girl passing by who offers to call Shingo. Shortly afterwards, Shingo meets up with Sakuno and the girl who helped her, Airi Sena, in a nearby park. Shingo, Sakuno and Shingo's friend, Hayata Mukunashi, who attend Kagamidai Private Academy, are three of the students chosen to take part in a temporary ten-month transfer to Yuijo Private Academy, which until now has been a prestigious all-girls school. Upon entering the school grounds, they are greeted by Angelina Nanatsu Sewell, a student and aspiring maid. The siblings are surprised to find Airi, who happens to be the daughter of Yuijo's principal, at the school. She makes it clear to Shingo and the others that not all of the students approve of the student transfer and that she is very against the transfer of boys into the school.
| 2 | "Rejection-Colored Cooking" "Kyozetsu-iro no Kukingu" (きょぜつ色のクッキング) | October 12, 2011 |
After Airi's declaration the previous day, a gloomy atmosphere develops among the Kagamidai students. Shingo realizes that Airi is the only one who can change the current mood at the school. Angelina likes the idea of there being more students around to serve, and one of Angelina's friends, Sana Inui, is also for the student transfer. Shingo makes several mistakes while adjusting to life at Yuijo which only serve to infuriate Airi. During lunch, Shingo meets Miu Amaha, a friendly third-year student, who is looking after a strange cat-like creature she has named Pannya. The gloomy atmosphere improves when the mixed class makes chestnut rice, with the boys following Shingo's good example. Since their efforts cannot be graded with leftover food, the boys prove their worth by gorging themselves to finish it off. The next day, Shingo and Airi are chosen as their class' representatives.
| 3 | "Annoyance-Colored Anxiety" "Iraira-iro no Dokidoki" (イライラ色のドキドキ) | October 19, 2011 |
Shingo cannot initially get the hang of being a class representative and continues to irritate Airi. Despite Shingo trying to be friendly with her, she makes it clear that she refuses to get along with the boys and she tells him to leave her alone. Later that night at school, Shingo again encounters Pannya, who leads him to a shed. There he find Miu who explains that this is the Nuko Club, which cares for injured animals before releasing them back into the wild; Pannya is one such animal. Miu asks Shingo to join the club. Shingo starts to get used to being a class representative and becomes faster at finishing the work. One evening, Airi has to leave early for a personal matter and Shingo offers to do the rest of the work by himself provided she tutor him for the upcoming tests. Later, Shingo goes to a local supermarket with his sister, Miu and Angelina, where they unexpectedly run into an embarrassed Airi.
| 4 | "Airi-Colored Secret" "Airi-iro no Himitsu" (アイリ色のひみつ) | October 26, 2011 |
Airi reveals that she has been living alone since she entered Yuijo and does not have much money to spend on living expenses. On the way back from the supermarket Shingo and the others stop by Airi's apartment and everyone helps to make dinner. Airi asks them to keep her living situation a secret so as to maintain her image at school. The next day, Airi eats lunch with Shingo and the other girls. Airi keeps her promise with Shingo and helps him as well as Sakuno, Angelina, Miu and Sana study for the upcoming tests. During another study session at Airi's apartment studying, Shingo and the girls celebrate Airi's birthday. While spending more time with the others, Airi begins opening up to them. After the exams are over, Airi and Shingo begin addressing each other without the use of honorifics.
| 5 | "I am Your-Colored Maid" "Anata-iro no Meido desu" (あなた色のメイドです) | November 2, 2011 |
Airi realizes her growing feelings for Shingo and she wants to confirm that she feels differently around Shingo compared to other boys. Shingo overhears that the principal is thinking about abolishing the Nuko Club because of complaints from various students. Due to Shingo's constant helpfulness, Angelina starts to see him as her rival in being a maid. The next day, Angelina runs around school looking for ways to help, but she has no luck in finding any work to do. Airi notices Angelina's attitude and goes to cheer her up. Afterwards, Angelina runs after Shingo and asks him if he will consent to be her master.
| 6 | "Search-Colored Bath Time" "Tesaguri-iro no Basu Taimu" (てさぐり色のバスタイム) | November 9, 2011 |
Angelina goes home with Shingo and Sakuno, only to find that she has nothing to do because they have all the household chores covered. Sakuno and Angelina both cook a meal for dinner and Angelina tries to be as helpful as possible to Shingo later on. Shingo officially joins the Nuko Club and assists Sana in posting member recruitment posters around the school since six members are needed to prevent the abolishment of the club. That night, the principal shows up at the Uryuu home to tell Angelina the student council president is having a hard time without her and Angelina happily returns to the academy, though she still considers Shingo to be her master. The recruitment posters are taken down and most of them are burned. Sakuno and Angelina join the club and help in the recruitment of a sixth member. A sudden rain shower soaks Shingo and Airi on the way home from school and Airi suggests that Shingo come to her apartment to get an umbrella. Airi offers him a bath to warm up before he leaves, but Shingo is reluctant to take one before her. The two of them end up taking a bath together with the lights out. The next day, despite being bad with animals, Airi decides to join the Nuko Club.
| 7 | "Twilight-Colored Swing" "Tasogare-iro no Buranko" (たそがれ色のブランコ) | November 16, 2011 |
Now with six members, the Nuko Club is officially recognized by the principal. Shingo and the others have to arrive early every day to care for the animals. Miu invites both Shingo and Sana to go with her to buy supplies for the club which displeases Sana. Sana's displeasure grows when she finds out that Miu and Shingo are now on a first name basis, and that Miu shared the cocoa that Sana gave her with Shingo. Another day, Shingo and Sana are left alone in the club room and Sana applies a compress to Shingo's aching neck. Shingo discovers there is a rumor going around that he and Sana are going out. Shingo talks with Sana about it, and she says she will clear up the rumor. Shingo and Sana decide to also refer to each other by their first names but she is still upset with Shingo because she thinks he likes Miu. Later, while working in the club room, Miu falls asleep on Shingo's shoulder.
| 8 | "Kitten-Colored Black and White" "Koneko-iro no Kuro to Shiro" (こねこ色の黒と白) | November 23, 2011 |
Sana finds that two kittens have abandoned at the Nuko Club. Since none of the members can take them home, they decide to care for them while they ask around for potential caretakers, but no one can take the kittens. Shingo notices Miu's wounded fingers and Sana tells him that Miu lets animals bite her to assure them that she will not hurt them. At the same time, Sana asks Shingo what he thinks about Miu. When Shingo comes to school early because of the kittens, he discovers that Miu stayed overnight and slept in the club room to look after them. Shingo asks her not to push herself too hard, as Sana listens from outside. Later on Sana asks Miu the same thing she did with Shingo. After responding, Miu then asks Sana what she thinks about him. Afterwards, the club members realize the black kitten responds to the name Shingo, while the white one responds to the name Miu. The principal expresses her concern that more pets will be abandoned at the Nuko Club, and makes sure the club is taking responsibility for the animals. Shingo tells Miu she should go home after school and get some rest because she has been pushing herself for the animals. When he arrives at the club room, Sana informs Shingo that Miu was suddenly called by her part-time job to fill in for someone else. Shingo goes after Miu to stop her and he catches her as she collapses.
| 9 | "Same-Colored Couple" "Onaji-iro no Futari" (おなじ色のフタリ) | November 30, 2011 |
Shingo brings Miu to his home and after a night's rest she returns home. To their surprise, later that day Shingo and Sana find Miu in the club room looking after the kittens. The Nuko Club's advisor, Machi Yatsuzuka, places the female kitten, Miu, with one of her friends. Sana volunteers to take the male kitten, Shingo, home with her, despite Miu's protests. Miu invites Shingo to her house to thank him for taking care of her when she collapsed. At her house, Shingo meets Miu's playful mother, whom he mistakes for her older sister. That evening after they part ways at the park, Shingo returns to Miu's house because he forgot his cell phone, and accidentally sees Miu in the nude. Miu promises Shingo she will depend on him more, instead of shouldering things all by herself. The next day, Sana runs out of the club room after noticing a difference in how Miu and Shingo act towards each other. Airi stops Sana and suspects that she is upset because of Shingo.
| 10 | "Tear-Colored Shelter" "Namida-iro no Amayadori" (なみだ色の雨やどり) | December 7, 2011 |
Airi is concerned that Sana is trying to ignore her feelings for Shingo and act like she has up until now. At lunch, Sana mentions that the kitten Shingo is still not used to his new home even after a week's time. The Nuko Club members clean up the club room, and Miu suggests that Sana and Shingo wash a fish tank together. When they return to the club room, they find their adviser has returned the kitten Miu, since she has also not become accustomed to her new home. Sana volunteers to take Miu in too and she leaves to go retrieve Shingo. Airi tries to stop her, but is unsuccessful. Miu tells Shingo that Sana is allergic to cats, which is why Miu was against Sana raising the kitten. Miu also tells Shingo about when she first met Pannya with its mother and later on found Pannya alone and hurt; Miu intends to eventually release Pannya back into the wild. Touched by Miu's gentleness, Shingo tells her that he loves her and as she accepts his feelings, they embrace each other. Sana, who witnessed this, runs off and cries on the swing set while holding the kitten Shingo in the rain. Airi arrives to comfort her and Sana cries on her shoulder.
| 11 | "Mashiroiro Symphony" "Mashiro-iro Shinfonī" (ましろ色シンフォニー) | December 14, 2011 |
Sana is absent from school, and Airi covers for her, telling the others she has a cold. Sana returns for the first day of finals and has dealt with her feelings for Shingo. Shingo studies with Miu at her house where her mother teases them. Sana later suggests that she and Shingo go buy a Christmas present for Miu, but Airi is concerned that Sana will end up hurt again. Sana, who still has feelings for Shingo, tells Airi that she will be satisfied in just hearing his voice over the phone. In return for accompanying him to buy Miu's present, Shingo buys Sana two cat plushies, one black and the other white. On Christmas Eve, Shingo meets up with Miu after her job is over and they go back to Shingo's house. Meanwhile, Sakuno, Angelina and Sana go to Airi's apartment. Angelina tells the others that she heard a rumor that the school merger is going through difficulties, and in the worst-case scenario, there will not be a merger. The girls, led by Sana, go outside and play in the snow in the nearby park where they talk about love. Back at Shingo's house, Shingo and Miu kiss repeatedly and embrace each other.
| 12 | "Beginning-Colored Season" "Hajimari-iro no Kisetsu" (はじまり色の季節) | December 21, 2011 |
Angelina, Airi and Sakuno see what they think is Pannya around town, but soon realize that it was in fact Pannya's mother. The Nuko Club members go to where Miu first met Pannya and see Mamanya (Pannya's mother) and another smaller Pannya-like animal with her. The club members realize they have to let Pannya go back to its family, though this weighs heavy on Miu most of all. Airi is inspired by Miu, who can still smile despite having to give Pannya up, to help the school merger succeed, and organizes a student rally for the cause. Miu tries to be overly happy towards Pannya, but breaks down in the club room and cries on Shingo's shoulder. After talking with her mother, Miu finally resolves to let Pannya go back to its family. The club members go to the forest clearing where Miu met Pannya and it is reunited with its family after the club members say goodbye. Time passes, and in the spring the school merger has been completed. After Miu graduated, Sana becomes the club president. Shingo and Miu spend time together in front of the cherry blossoms. Shingo and Miu return to the forest clearing and see Pannya's tail in the bush.

== Music ==
The visual novel Mashiroiro Symphony has three theme songs: the opening theme "Symphonic Love" (シンフォニック・ラブ) sung by Miyuki Hashimoto, the insert song "Sayonara Kimi no Koe" (さよなら君の声) sung by Aki Misato, and the ending theme "Kimi-Iro Mirai" (キミイロミライ) sung by ЯIRE. The PC game's original soundtrack was released by Palette on December 27, 2009. The opening theme for the PSP version is "Yumemiru Mama ni Koi o Shite" (夢見るままに恋をして) by Hashimoto. An image song album titled Mashiroiro Symphony Original Drama Series Sound Portrait was released on November 24, 2010, by Lantis featuring the theme songs from the drama CDs as well as other songs by Hashimoto, Misato, Rino and ЯIRE.

The anime has two theme songs: the opening theme "Authentic Symphony" by Choucho, and the ending theme "Suisai Candy" (水彩キャンディー) by Marble. "Sayonara Kimi no Koe" is also included in the anime's final episode. The single for "Authentic Symphony" was released on October 26, 2011, while the single for "Suisai Candy" was released on November 9, 2011. Two character song singles sung by the voice actresses from the anime were released by Lantis. The first, titled "Character Palette Vol. 1", for the characters Airi Sena and Sakuno Uryū, sung by Ryōko Ono and Mai Gotō, respectively, was released on November 23, 2011. The second, titled "Character Palette Vol. 2", for the characters Miu Amaha, Sana Inui and Angelina Nanatsu Sewell, sung by Noriko Rikimaru, Mayumi Yoshida and Oma Ichimura, respectively, was released on December 21, 2011. The anime's original soundtrack titled Mashiroiro no Melody (ましろ色の旋律) was released on January 25, 2012.

== Reception ==
From July to September 2009, Mashiroiro Symphony ranked three times in the top ten in national PC game pre-orders in Japan. The rankings were at No. 10 in July, No. 7 in August, and No. 1 in September. Mashiroiro Symphony ranked twice in terms of national sales of PC games in Japan: at No. 1 in October 2009 and at No. 49 in January 2010.

On reviewing the English release Mashiroiro Symphony HD -Love Is Pure White- based on the Japanese 2023 FHD release, Thomas Knight of NookGaming highly recommended the visual novel praising the way it explores relationships.
