= Palette (company) =

Japanese virtual novel studio

- Logo
- Industry: Computer games
- Founded: February 4, 2002
- Headquarters: Tokyo, Japan
- Products: Visual novels
- Website: www.clearrave.co.jp

Palette (Japanese: ぱれっと, Hepburn: Paretto; also stylized as PALETTE) is a Japanese visual novel studio founded in 2002. It is an adult game brand under Clearrave (株式会社クリアレーヴ, Kabushiki gaisha Kuriarēvu), a software company located in Mitaka, Tokyo. Palette is known for developing Mashiroiro Symphony, their ninth title released in 2009. It was ported to the PlayStation Portable and was adapted into an anime television series in 2011.

== Works ==
=== Palette ===
Between 2002 and 2019, sixteen works were released from Palette, and the upcoming seventeenth work will be released in 2020. (Note: 製品情報 [Product] (in Japanese). Palette.)

#	Title	Release date	Character design	Scenario	Music
1	Hachimitsu-sou de Hoppe ni Chuu (はちみつ荘deほっぺにチュウ)	September 27, 2002	Tamahiyo (Note: たまひよ)	Junichi Yonemura (Note: 米村 純一, Yonemura Jun'ichi)	Kashiwamaru (Note: かしわ丸)
2	Fukushuu no Megami: Nemesis (復讐の女神 -Nemesis-)	April 25, 2003	Tamahiyo	Aoi Futami (Note: 双海 葵, Futami Aoi)	Kashiwamaru
3	Ai Cute! Kimi ni Koi Shiteru (愛cute! キミに恋してる)	February 27, 2004	Tamahiyo	N. Koretto (Note: これっと)	Kashiwamaru
4	Maria Diana (MERI+DIA ～マリアディアナ～)	March 25, 2005	Tamahiyo	N.	Kashiwamaru
5	Moshimo Ashita ga Hare Naraba (もしも明日が晴れならば)	February 24, 2006	Kusukusu (Note: くすくす)	Nyaon	Burton; Hideki Higuchi (Note: 樋口 秀樹, Higuchi Hideki)
6	MP (えむぴぃ Maid promotion master)	February 23, 2007	Tamahiyo	N.	Burton
7	Sakura Strasse (さくらシュトラッセ)	January 25, 2008	Kusukusu	Nyaon	Burton; Hideki Higuchi
8	Sakuranbo Strasse (Sakura Strasse FanDisc) (さくらんぼシュトラッセ)	August 29, 2008	Kusukusu	Nyaon	Burton; Hideki Higuchi
9	Mashiroiro Symphony (ましろ色シンフォニー -Love is pure white-)	October 30, 2009	Tsubasu Izumi (Note: 和泉 つばす, Izumi Tsubasu)	Kei Hozumi (Note: 保住 圭, Hozumi Kei); Orgel (Note: おるごぅる, Orugouru); Hare Kitagawa (Note: 北川 晴, Kitagawa Hare)	Burton
10	Steal My Heart (すてぃ～るMyはぁと ～Rhapsody of moonlight～)	July 30, 2010	Tamahiyo	Koroya Kimura (Note: 木村 ころや, Kimura Koroya); Ichirou Tanaka (Note: 田中 一郎, Tanaka Ichirō); N.	Burton
11	Hare Tokidoki Otenkiame (晴れときどきお天気雨)	November 25, 2011	Kusukusu	Nyaon	Burton
12	Minna Sasagechau! (みんな捧げちゃう!)	February 28, 2013	Tamahiyo	Takami Tanikawa (Note: たにかわ たかみ, Tanikawa Takami); Ganosu (Note: がのす)	Shade
13	Koi ga Saku Koro Sakura Doki (恋がさくころ桜どき)	June 27, 2014	Tsubasu Izumi	Mirai Minase (Note: みなせ 未來, Minase Mirai)	Burton
14	9-Nine: Kokonotsu Kokonoka Kokonoiro (9-nine-ここのつここのかここのいろ)	April 28, 2017	Tsubasu Izumi	Kazuki Fumi	Abukawa Osamu
15	9-Nine: Sorairo Sorauta Soranooto (9-nine-そらいろそらうたそらのおと)	April 27, 2018	Tsubasu Izumi	Kazuki Fumi	Abukawa Osamu
16	9-Nine: Haruiro Harukoi Harunokaze (9-nine-はるいろはるこいはるのかぜ)	April 26, 2019	Tsubasu Izumi	Kazuki Fumi	Abukawa Osamu
17	9-Nine: Yukiiro Yukihana Yukinoato (9-nine-ゆきいろゆきはなゆきのあと)	April 24, 2020	Tsubasu Izumi	Kazuki Fumi	Abukawa Osamu
18	9-Nine: Shinshou (9-nine-新章)	April 23, 2021	Tsubasu Izumi	Kazuki Fumi	Abukawa Osamu

=== Palette Darkside ===
Palette Darkside (Palette darkside) is a sub-brand of Palette. Their sole work Kegareta Neoro: Taorareta Shimai was released on November 12, 2004. Palette Darkside's official website (Note: http://www.clearrave.co.jp/index3.htm (2004–2006), http://www.clearrave.co.jp/ds/index3.htm (2006–2007)) was closed on April 21, 2007, when Palette announced the first report of Sakura Strasse.

#	Title	Release date	Character design	Scenario	Music
1	Kegareta Neoro: Taorareta Shimai (汚れた音色～手折られた姉妹～)	November 12, 2004	Oura Masuda (Note: 増田 逢羅, Masuda Ōra)	Nyaon; Shiyu Kurotaki (Note: 黒瀧 絲由, Kurotaki Shiyu)	Kashiwamaru

== Internet radio show ==
An Internet radio show titled Homerarete Nobiru Radio (ほめられてのびるらじお, Homerarete Nobiru Rajio; lit. A Radio Which Thrives on Praise), abbreviated as HomeRadi (ほめらじ, Homeraji), began to broadcast on March 8, 2007. This series is sponsored by Purple Software and Palette, and the show is hosted by Hideki Ogihara and Kazane. The show title was Homerarete Nobiru Radio PP (Note: PP represents Purple and Palette.) at first, but later it changed to Homerarete Nobiru Radio Z on May 5, 2011.

== Palette Broadcasting Station ==
Palette Broadcasting Station (ぱれっと放送局, Paretto Hōsōkyoku) began to broadcast at Niconicommunity on May 2, 2012.

== Notes ==
Japanese
