= List of Akaneiro ni Somaru Saka episodes =

The episodes of Akaneiro ni Somaru Saka are produced by TNK based on the original Japanese adult visual novel by Feng of the same name. The episodes are directed by Keitaro Motonaga and composed by Makoto Uezu. The anime series will be airing first on Chiba TV on October 2, 2008, and subsequently on various other broadcast stations.

Eleven pieces of theme music are used for the episodes; one opening theme and 10 ending themes. The opening theme is "Hatsukoi Parachute" (初恋パラシュート) by Miyuki Hashimoto. The first ending theme, "Sweet Gift" by Rie Kugimiya, used in the first two episodes; the second ending theme, "Confusion..." by Ryou Hirohashi, was used for the episode three; the third ending theme, "Shōjo Test wa Muzukashii" (少女テストは難しい) by Emiri Katou, was used for episode four; the fourth ending theme, "Akane-Iro Hometown" (茜色 hometown) by Rie Kugimiya, was used in episode five; the fifth ending theme, "Cherry Pink Mystery" by Emiri Katou, was used in episode six; the sixth ending theme, "Make a Miracle!" by Rie Tanaka, was used in episode seven; the seventh ending theme, "Love Diving" (ラブダイビング, Rabu Daibingu) by Marina Inoue, was used in the eighth episode; the eighth ending theme, "Chu.chu.ru. no yakusoku" by Rie Tanaka, was used in episode nine; the ninth ending theme, "Mezamenai Wish" (目覚めない Wish...) by Aya Hirano was used in episodes ten and eleven and the tenth ending theme, "Ai Koko Kara" (愛ここから) by Aya Hirano was used in episode twelve.

== Episode list ==
No.	Title	Original release date
1	"A Madder Red First Kiss"; Transliteration: "Akaneiro no Fāsuto Kissu" (Japanese: あかね色のファーストキッス "The Scarlet First Kiss")	October 2, 2008
Whilst walking in the evening, Yuuhi is saved from two guys trying to pick her up by Jun'ichi, going away only knowing him as "the Geno Killer". The next day at school, when Yuuhi transfers into Jun'ichi's class, both are surprised to see each other again so soon. During a discussion with Ayanokouji, she asks Jun'ichi out, shocking the class. It then turns out only to be for a cup of tea, which is how she wanted to express her gratitiude. She learns that he was a former delinquent. The following day, Yuuhi is pressed for details with regards to her first encounter with Jun'ichi, and in his confusion on clarifying matters for the class, Jun'ichi kisses her, only to get beaten up for taking her first kiss. That evening, Yuuhi turns up at the Nagase residence, stating that she is moving in as Junichi's fiancee, much to his and Minato's surprise.
2	"A Madder Red Approach"; Transliteration: "Akaneiro no Apurōchi" (Japanese: あかね色のアプローチ "The Scarlet Approach")	October 9, 2008
A scene from Yuuhi's past provides some background on the arranged marriage between Jun'ichi and Yuuhi and to her moving in with him. Yuuhi and Jun'ichi have trouble adjusting to living together, and Yuuhi spends her first night sleeping on the couch. The next day after school Yuuhi goes grocery shopping with Minato for dinner. Yuuhi is amazed by the supermarket and by Minato's shopping savviness. That evening after supper the Nagase residence loses power and Yuuhi trips in the dark and falls on Jun'ichi leading to another very awkward situation. Minato resets the breakers and power is restored, but Yuuhi blames Jun'ichi and puts him into a Cross Armlock, which leads to another awkward situation. Yuuhi ends up sleeping in Minato's room and the two girls are able to talk and become better friends. It is revealed that his parents are the people shown fighting on the train.
3	"A Mysterious Scream"; Transliteration: "Kaikiiro no Sukurīmu" (Japanese: 怪奇色のスクリーム "The Bizarrely-Colored Scream")	October 16, 2008
Jun'ichi's teacher Seijirou Sugishita goes missing in an abandoned portion of the school. The student council president Mitsuki Siina enlists Jun'ichi and his friends to search for him in the abandoned school building. While searching Jun'ichi and Yuuhi fall down a trap door into a pit. The two are forced to work together to try to get out, but are unable to escape. In the same pit Mr. Sugishita wakes up from under a blanket and the trio are found shortly afterward by Minato.
4	"An Indigo Mad Party"; Transliteration: "Aiiro no Maddo Pāti" (Japanese: 藍色のマッドパーティ "The Blue Mad Party")	October 23, 2008
Karen Ayanokouji, Jun'ichi's classmate, invites him and his class to her casual "home" party. He is at first not interested, but is dragged along by Minato who also receives an invitation. When they arrive Jun'ichi, Yuuhi, and company find that the party is actually a formal event on a huge cruise ship. Seeing how underdressed everyone is Karen loans them some formal wear, and Minato makes quite the impression on Jun'ichi when he sees her with her revealing dress. This causes Jun'ichi to have awkward feelings about his sister and asks her to cover up. Later, on their way back from the ladies room, the girls discover the kitchen is seriously behind schedule as most of the cooks are seasick. This prompts Minato and the girls to swing into action to save the party. The girls finish the feast and Minato puts on a show slicing up a tuna. Karen, feeling upstaged by the tuna show, puts on her own performance fighting against a giant octopus. This sends a scared Yuuhi running out onto the deck where she trips and activates the fireworks, which ricochet throughout the ship causing a fire in the party hall. Everyone escapes safely except for Minato and Yuuhi, and so Jun'ichi goes into the fire to save them.
5	"A Madder Red First Date"; Transliteration: "Akaneiro no Fāsuto Dēto" (Japanese: あかね色のファーストデート "The Scarlet First Date")	October 30, 2008
Jun'ichi asks Minato to see a monster movie with him, which causes Yuuhi to become angry that Jun'ichi never thought to include her. Just before the trio are about to leave, Minato fakes a phone call and makes up a lie about a previous commitment she forgot about and cannot cancel, forcing Jun'ichi and Yuuhi to go on a date. While the two are out Minato decides to go shopping. After the movie, Yuuhi accidentally walks into a man, spilling her food onto him. Jun'ichi quickly comes to Yuuhi's rescue again and saves her from the man and his friend. Jun'ichi and Yuuhi continue with their date, but are caught by Mitsuki in the park, and are forced to make a quick exit to avoid Mitsuki's questioning. On their way home, Yuuhi's hat is blown onto a rock by the side of the river. Jun'ichi goes to retrieve her hat but accidentally falls in, sending Yuuhi into a panic. Yuuhi rushes them home in a cab and frantically searches the house for medicine and blankets. Minato comes home soon afterwards and cures Jun'ichi with some instant ramen. The next day, everyone at school is talking about Jun'ichi and Yuuhi's date thanks to Mitsuki and Nagomi (who was also at the movie).
6	"A Golden Yellow Montage"; Transliteration: "Yamabukiiro no Montānyu" (Japanese: 山吹色のモンターニュ "The Golden Yellow Montagne")	November 6, 2008
Karen invites Jun'ichi and his school friends (including their teacher) up to a mountain hotel resort to make up for the events of the cruise ship party. While there, everyone continues to hang around and tease Jun'ichi, who is not impressed by their company. Karen takes this to mean that Jun'ichi is not satisfied with the luxuries of the hotel and so she takes the group on a long hike up to the Ayanokouji family's secret hot spring. There they learn that the secret hot spring is a co-ed bath, which causes some problems since there are guys and girls. This is shortly interrupted by the sounds of a beast, and Minato takes off to find out the source of the noise. Jun'ichi, worried for his sister, follows soon afterwards with the rest of the group in tow, only to find Minato bathing in the hot spring with a bear and cub. The bear and cub leave and the group go in for a dip, boys on one side, girls on the other, and Jun'ichi tries to deal with his urge not to peek on the girls. Jun'ichi ultimately gives in, but finds that the girls have already left to interrogate Yuuhi about her relationship with Jun'ichi.
7	"A Steel Festival"; Transliteration: "Haganeiro no Fesutibaru" (Japanese: 鋼色のフェスティバル "The Steel-Colored Festival")	November 13, 2008
It's the school Cultural Festival and Yuuhi, Karen, Fuyuhiko and Tsukasa (along with the rest of their classmates) are doing a Yakisoba café. However, they face tough competition from the Yakisoba stand put up by Minato and the tennis club. Meanwhile Jun'ichi is kidnapped by Mitsuki, Nagomi and Mr. Sugishita for secret training regarding a dangerous mission. Back at the Yakisoba café the girls end up wearing their school swimsuits to attract business and end up triumphing over the tennis club's Yakisoba stand. At the end of the festival everyone is called out to the school track field to witness Jun'ichi's epic battle in his "Big Genokiller" against a robotic octopus.
8	"A Twilight Desire"; Transliteration: "Tasogareiro no Dezaia" (Japanese: 黄昏色のデザイア "The Dusk-Colored Desire")	November 20, 2008
Tsukasa conducts the school's sports meet since Mitsuki is sick. After school Tsukasa shows Jun'ichi and Yuuhi an embarrassing picture of the two from the cultural festival she intends to enter in a contest for best media, which eventually leads Jun'ichi to bring up embarrassing things from Tsukasa's past to put an end to her teasing. This causes Tsukasa to recall her childhood dream to become a voice actress. The next day the students are given a career investigation assignment and Tsukasa sets out fulfill her dream by applying and preparing for an audition. Unfortunately on the day of the audition Tsukasa becomes very nervous and she loses her voice during the audition. Later however, after a talk with Jun'ichi, Tsukasa decides to renew her ambition to become a voice actress.
9	"A Madder Red Birthday"; Transliteration: "Akaneiro no Bāsudei" (Japanese: あかね色のバースデイ "The Scarlet Birthday")	November 27, 2008
Tsukasa's photo of Jun'ichi and Yuuhi from the Cultural Festival comes in first place as Best Amitié. Minato convinces Yuuhi to help with Jun'ich's surprise birthday party by getting Jun'ichi's present, but Yuuhi has a difficult time choosing a gift. She ends up sneaking into Jun'ichi's room for some clues on what to get him and discovers Jun'ichi's stash of dirty magazines. While looking through the magazines Yuuhi is caught by Minato and confesses her difficulty trying to find Jun'ichi's gift. Minato offers to let Yuuhi bake the cake instead as her present to Jun'ichi. The next day at his party Jun'ichi receives many strange birthday gifts from friends and family. Afterwards Jun'ichi finds the cake Yuuhi baked and everyone tries a piece. The cake did not turn out very well, but Jun'ichi tells Yuuhi that it is delicious because she baked it for him. Minato begins to feel jealous.
10	"A Madder Red Confusion"; Transliteration: "Akaneiro no Konfyūjon" (Japanese: あかね色のコンフュ−ジョン "The Scarlet Confusion")	December 4, 2008
Yuuhi is beginning to understand her feelings for Jun'ichi. As a result she fakes being sick and Jun'ichi stays home from school to care for her. Yuuhi demands a redo first kiss and the two finally confess their true feelings. At school the girls encourage Yuuhi to take initiative to move her and Jun'ichi's relationship to the next level, and Karen announces her intentions towards Jun'ichi. The next day Fuyuhiko confronts Jun'ichi about his feelings for his sister and advises Jun'ichi to make a decision. At Nagomi's suggestion Yuuhi comes to Jun'ichi's bedroom in middle of the night dressed as a maid and despite some awkwardness the two are able to become closer. The next evening Yuuhi leaves to report back to her family leaving Jun'ichi and Minato alone. Minato uses this chance to express her feelings for her brother and Jun'ichi is still unsure how he feels for his sister.
11	"A Madder Red Puzzlement"; Transliteration: "Akaneiro no Pazurumento" (Japanese: あかね色のパズルメント "The Scarlet Puzzlement")	December 11, 2008
Yuuhi meets with her father and rejects her engagement to Jun'ichi, saying she'd rather decide for herself without external pressures. Upon her return Yuuhi senses some weirdness she can't place in the Nagase home, but neither Minato nor Jun'ichi are willing to admit anything. This causes a rift between Yuuhi and Jun'ichi, which everyone at school notices. When confronted about the apparent rift between the two Yuuhi lies to cover up the true nature of the situation. After school Jun'ichi is whisked away to meet his parents, who have suddenly returned to the country, leaving Yuuhi and Minato alone at home for the evening. After dinner Yuuhi reveals to Minato her intention to leave the Nagase house, the nullified engagement and her hurt at being lied to. Minato finally admits her love for Jun'ichi and her heartache regarding the situation and Yuuhi hugs her.
12	"A Madder Red Hill"; Transliteration: "Akaneiro ni Somaru Saka" (Japanese: あかね色に染まる坂 "The Scarlet-Dyed Hillslope")	December 18, 2008
After Jun'ichi came back home after meeting his parents, Yuuhi was so angry over Jun'ichi lying to her that she decided to break up with him and leave the house that night. The next day, Minato left the house as well in order for Jun'ichi to make a decision between her and Yuuhi. When Jun'ichi got back home from school, he started thinking about the moment Minato came back from training and decided to take care of him a few years ago. Mr. Sugishita suddenly appeared to tell Jun'ichi to become a man and be true to himself, after taking him to the beach. Meanwhile, Yuuhi decided to stay at Karen's place and Minato stayed with Nagomi. When Jun'ichi got back to the house, he felt lonely and thought about his past and the girl he loves most, by the help of an imaginary Geno-killer, his past self before Minato arrived. With the help of his past self he finally became one with his alter-ego, and Jun'ichi confessed his love to Minato.
13 (OVA)	"It's the Akane-iro ni Somaru Saka Hardcore OVA, Big Brother!!"; Transliteration: "Akaneiro ni Somaru Saka Hādokoa OVA desuyo nīsan!!" (Japanese: あかね色に染まる坂 ハードコア OVAですよっにいさん!!)	June 26, 2009
With the summer crisp smell in the air, Jun'ichi and the group head to one of Ayanokouji's Families privately owned islands. To have a so called "Student Vacation" But, the school president has a plan to make this vacation as perverted as possible. Though a much conceited effort, she exclaims to have received sun skin lotion from a sponsor company of hers. In a scene it shows on the lotion containers. "Warning, May cause extreme daringness" "Ingredients, etc, etc, etc" in other words, a love potion. With this the girls each on their own torment Jun'ichi throughout the day and have a perverted but entertaining time. Thus Nagomi comes in with her alienated antics and saves the day by knocking everyone out with her chopoooo's. The following morning everyone thinks it was just a dream. Thus ending their perverted vacation.
