= Akaneiro ni Somaru Saka =

Japanese visual novel

- Akaneiro ni Somaru Saka original visual novel cover

あかね色に染まる坂
- Genre: Romance
- Video game
- Developer: Feng
- Publisher: Feng (Windows); GN Software (PS2/PSP)
- Genre: Eroge, Visual novel
- Platform: Windows, PS2, PSP
- Released: July 27, 2007 (Windows)
- Light novel

Akaneiro ni Somaru Saka: Nagomi Maniacs
- Written by: Mutsuki Mizusaki
- Illustrated by: Akira Sawano
- Published by: Harvest
- Imprint: Nagomi Bunko
- Published: December 15, 2007
- Light novel

Akaneiro ni Somaru Saka: Nagase Minato no Koi Iro
- Written by: Mao Shinji
- Illustrated by: Ryohka (cover); Piēru Yoshio
- Published by: Kill Time Communication
- Imprint: Nijigen Game Bunko
- Published: February 29, 2008
- Manga
- Written by: Feng
- Illustrated by: Homare Sakazuki
- Published by: Kadokawa Shoten
- Magazine: Comp Ace
- Original run: June 26, 2008 – June 26, 2009
- Volumes: 2
- Anime television series
- Directed by: Keitarō Motonaga
- Produced by: Uesama; Katsumi Koike; Makoto Itō; Masanori Gotō; Tetsuko Kotani
- Written by: Makoto Uezu
- Music by: Kenichiro Suehiro
- Studio: TNK
- Licensed by: NA: Sentai Filmworks
- Original network: Chiba TV, Tokyo MX, KBS, TV Saitama, NBN, AT-X
- Original run: October 2, 2008 – December 18, 2008
- Episodes: 12 + OVA

Akaneiro ni Somaru Saka (あかね色に染まる坂; lit. The Hill Dyed Rose Madder), also known in short as Akasaka, is a Japanese adult visual novel developed by Feng and first released for Windows as a DVD on July 27, 2007. A version without adult content was released under the title Akaneiro ni Somaru Saka: Parallel on July 31, 2008, by GN Software for the PlayStation 2. A port of this version of the game was released for the PlayStation Portable on December 17, 2009, under the title Akaneiro ni Somaru Saka: Portable. The gameplay of Akaneiro ni Somaru Saka follows a plot line which offers predetermined scenarios with courses of interaction, and focuses on the appeal of the six female main characters.

Two light novels were produced between December 2007 and February 2008 written by different authors, and an Internet radio show began in April 2008. A manga adaptation began serialization in Kadokawa Shoten's seinen magazine Comp Ace on June 26, 2008, illustrated by Homare Sakazuki. An anime adaptation produced by TNK and directed by Keitaro Motonaga aired in Japan between October and December 2008.

== Gameplay ==
An average conversation in Akaneiro ni Somaru Saka featuring the main character talking to Tsukasa.

The gameplay of Akaneiro ni Somaru Saka requires little interaction from the player as most of the duration of the game is spent simply reading the text that appears on the screen which represents either dialogue between the various characters or the inner thoughts of the protagonist. Every so often, the player will come to a point where he or she is given the chance to choose from multiple options. The time between these points is variable and can occur anywhere from a minute to much longer. Gameplay pauses at these points and depending on which choice the player makes, the plot will progress in a specific direction. In the original version, there are six main plot lines that the player will have the chance to experience, one for each of the heroines in the story. This number increases to seven with the PlayStation 2 version. The player needs to replay the game multiple times and make different decisions to progress the plot in an alternate direction to view all storylines. One of the goals of the gameplay from the PC version is enabling them to view sex scenes depicting the protagonist, Jun'ichi, and six heroines.

== Plot ==
High school student Jun'ichi Nagase goes by the nickname Geno Killer since he was rebellious in middle school. This is used inadvertently to help a girl named Yuuhi Katagiri from trouble, who later transfers to his school. Jun'ichi kisses her due to a misunderstanding. Outraged, because he stole her first kiss and make her embarrassed, she screams at him. Later, it turns out that Yuuhi is his fiancée as arranged by their parents. Their parents discuss the matter and order them to go out together for one month to restore their relationship. If their relationship does not get better, the engagement will be canceled.

== Characters ==
Jun'ichi Nagase (長瀬 準一, Nagase Jun'ichi)
Voiced by: Wataru Hatano (anime)
Jun'ichi is the main protagonist of the series and is a second year high school student. He had a reputation of a delinquent in junior high school until his sister, Minato, decided to move in with him. Junichi has a snarky attitude and is often teased by everyone around him, including his teacher.
Yuuhi Katagiri (片桐 優姫, Katagiri Yūhi)
Voiced by: Harumi Sakurai (PC), Rie Kugimiya (anime/PS2)
Yuuhi is the main heroine in the series. She is very beautiful, which often causes trouble for her, since it draws unwanted attention from men. One day, when Yuuhi was being harassed by two men, she was saved by Jun'ichi. The next day, Yuuhi transfers to his school and class, hoping meet her fiancé because she heard that he was in this area. Later, after a misunderstanding on Jun'ichi's part, Junichi kisses her in public, causing her to have ill feelings towards him. Throughout the series, her feelings for him grow.
Minato Nagase (長瀬 湊, Nagase Minato)
Voiced by: Hikaru Mizusawa (PC), Aya Hirano (anime/PS2)
Minato is Jun'ichi's younger sister and attends the same school that he does as a first year high school student. She is capable in all areas of household related work and is proud of it. She also has unique abilities, like listening to the ground to detect the presence of animals, as well as be able to communicate with them. She has feelings for Jun'ichi. She mentions that she was adopted once, but later says it was a joke. In the PC game Minato is blood-related to Jun'ichi but in the PS2 version she is not related to him, and it is implied that she is not blood-related to Jun'ichi in the anime. In the anime version she ends up with Jun'ichi; in the manga however, he doesn't reciprocate her feelings, and ends up with Yuuhi.
Tsukasa Kiryu (霧生 つかさ, Kiryū Tsukasa)
Voiced by: Nami Kurokawa (PC), Marina Inoue (anime/PS2)
Tsukasa is the lively second year student in the same class as Jun'ichi, and is a childhood friend. She is a member of the News club. Tsukasa loves to gossip as well as tease Jun'ichi.
Nagomi Shiraishi (白石 なごみ, Shiraishi Nagomi)
Voiced by: Oma Ichimura (PC), Ryō Hirohashi (anime/PS2)
Nagomi is a first year high school student in the same class as Minato. She has an air of mystery around her, which is hinted of being an alien, and can be found just about anywhere at the right time.
Mitsuki Siina (椎名 観月, Shiina Mitsuki)
Voiced by: Mayumi Yoshida (PC), Rie Tanaka (anime/PS2)
Mitsuki is the president of the student council. She is a third year student who is popular among the student body. Mitsuki likes to use Jun'ichi as her lapdog getting him to do favors for her or perform activities for the student body.
Mikoto Tachibana (橘 ミコト, Tachibana Mikoto)
Voiced by: Fūri Samoto (PC), Erino Hazuki (anime/PS2)
Mikoto is a third year high school student in the same class as Mitsuki. She has an individual route which is not available at the beginning of the PC game.
Karen Ayanokouji (綾小路 華恋, Ayanokōji Karen)
Voiced by: Emiri Katō (anime/PS2)
Karen is a second year student that is in the same class as Jun'ichi. She was first introduced in Parallel. Karen comes from a very rich family like Yuuhi and is proud of herself on acting like a lady. She becomes best friends with Yuuhi. She eventually admits to falling in love with Jun'ichi.
Fuyuhiko Nishino (西野 冬彦, Nishino Fuyuhiko)
Voiced by: Daisuke Kishio (PC), Akira Ishida (anime/PS2)
Nishino is Jun'ichi's best friend in second year of high school who serves as vice-president of the student council. He is full of strange ideas that often get Jun'ichi into trouble, and close to Tsukasa due to being the same line of thinking with her.
Seijirou Sugishita (杉下 清次郎, Sugishita Seijirō)
Voiced by: Jin Aoshima (PC), Rikiya Koyama (anime/PS2)
Sugishita is Jun'ichi's teacher. Despite being strict when it comes to academics, he has a rather eccentric personality, especially towards him.
Aya Nijo (二条 亜矢, Nijō Aya)
Voiced by: Rokumi Maminami (PC), Kaori Fukuhara (anime/PS2)
Nijo is the secretary and treasurer of the student council.
Yutori Shiraishi (白石 ゆとり, Shiraishi Yutori)
Voiced by: Oma Ichimura (PC), Ryō Hirohashi (anime/PS2)
Yutori is the younger sister of Nagomi.
Sai Fujimiya (藤宮 彩, Fujimiya Sai)
Voiced by: Hikaru Kaga (PC), Yū Kobayashi (anime/PS2)

== Development ==
Akaneiro ni Somaru Saka is the fifth project developed by the visual novel studio Feng, and is similar to their fourth title Aozora no Mieru Oka. The producer for the game is Uezama. The project uses four different artists in character design: Tsubasu Izumi (designer of Yuuhi, Mitsuki, and Mikoto), Ryohka (designer of Minato and Nagomi), Naturalton (designer of Tsukasa), and Akira Sawano (designer of the protagonist, and the supporting cast). The scenario was entirely written by Kenji Saitō. For the PlayStation 2 version, an additional heroine named Karen Ayanokōji was included and is designed by Manabu Aoi.

=== Release history ===
On July 23, 2007, a free game demo of Akaneiro ni Somaru Saka became available for download at Feng's official website. In the demo, the player was introduced to the main characters in the game through a sequence that is typical of the gameplay found in a visual novel which includes times during gameplay where the player is given several choices to make in order to further the plot in a specific direction. The full game was first released on July 27, 2007, as a DVD playable only on a Microsoft Windows PC, containing full voice acting with the exception of Jun'ichi. A PlayStation 2 version without adult content was released on July 31, 2008, by GN Software under the title Akaneiro ni Somaru Saka: Parallel (あかね色に染まる坂 ぱられる, Akaneiro ni Somaru Saka: Parareru).

== Adaptations ==
=== Books ===
Two light novels have been produced. The first, published on December 15, 2007, by Harvest, is written by Mutsuki Mizusaki and illustrated by Akira Sawano. The second, published on February 29, 2008, by Kill Time Communication, is written by Mao Shinji, the front cover is illustrated by Ryohka, and the inside has illustrations by Piēru Yoshio. An art book for the visual novel called Akaneiro ni Somaru Saka Official Fan Book (あかね色に染まる坂 オフィシャルファンブック, Akaneiro ni Somaru Saka Ofisharu Fan Bukku) was published on February 29, 2008, by Broccoli.

=== Internet radio show ===
An Internet radio show to promote the Akaneiro ni Somaru Saka: Parallel called Koyama Rikiya×Hirohashi Ryō no Akaneiro ni Somaru Radio (小山力也×広橋涼のあかね色に染まるラジオ) began broadcasting on April 2, 2008, and is distributed on Nico Radio. The show is streamed online every Thursday, and is hosted by Rikiya Koyama and Ryō Hirohashi who voice Seijirō Sugishita and Nagomi Shiraishi from the visual novel. There are seven corners, or parts, to the show that each episode is divided into. Several voice actors from the visual novel have appeared on the show as guests who include Erino Hazuki (as Mikoto), Marina Inoue (as Tsukasa), Miyuki Hashimoto, Emiri Katō (as Karen), and Kaori Fukuhara (as Aya).

=== Manga ===
A manga adaptation began serialization in Kadokawa Shoten's seinen magazine Comp Ace on June 26, 2008. The story is based on the visual novel that preceded it, and is illustrated by Homare Sakazuki.

=== Anime ===
An anime adaptation produced by animation studio TNK, directed by Keitaro Motonaga, and written by Makoto Uezu aired in Japan on Chiba TV between October 2 and December 18, 2008. The anime's opening theme, "Hatsukoi Parachute" (初恋パラシュート, Hatsukoi Parashūto), is performed by Miyuki Hashimoto and the ending theme, "Sweet Gift", is performed by Rie Kugimiya. A second ending theme performed by Ryō Hirohashi, "Confusion...", is used for episode three. TNK made a mistake in the credits for "Hatsukoi Parachute" and named it "Ren'ai Parachute" instead. An additional original video animation episode was released on June 26, 2009, with the seventh and final DVD compilation volume. Anime licensor Sentai Filmworks has licensed the series along with the OVA and release the complete collection on March 8, 2011.

== Music ==
The PC version of the visual novel has two main theme songs, one opening theme and one ending theme. The opening theme, "Setsunasa no Gradation" (せつなさのグラデイション, Setsunasa no Guradeishon), is sung by Miyuki Hashimoto, written by Aki Hata, composed by Akiko Tomita, and arranged by Junpei Fujita. The ending theme, "Akaneiro ni Somaru Saka" (あかね色に染まる坂), is sung by Chiki-chan, written by Hata, and is composed and arranged by Yūichi Nakano. The PS2 version's opening theme is "Akane no Saka" (あかねの坂), which is sung and composed by Hashimoto, written by Noboru Yamaguchi, and arranged by Masaki Suzuki. The PC game's original soundtrack called Gradation! was released by Lantis on October 31, 2008, containing two discs.
