= Walkure Romanze =

Japanese visual novel and anime series

- Walkure Romanze: Shōjo Kishi Monogatari

ワルキューレ ロマンツェ 少女騎士物語 (Warukyūre Romantse Shōjo Kishi Monogatari)
- Genre: Action, Romance, Sports-(Jousting)
- Video game
- Developer: Ricotta
- Publisher: Ricotta
- Genre: Eroge, Visual novel
- Platform: Windows
- Released: JP: October 28, 2011
- Anime television series
- Directed by: Yūsuke Yamamoto
- Written by: Kazuyuki Fudeyasu
- Music by: Lantis
- Studio: Eight Bit
- Original network: Tokyo MX, Sun TV, AT-X, KBS, TV Aichi
- Original run: October 6, 2013 – December 22, 2013
- Episodes: 12
- icon

Walkure Romanze: Shōjo Kishi Monogatari (ワルキューレ ロマンツェ 少女騎士物語, Warukyūre Romantse Shōjo Kishi Monogatari; lit. Valkyrie Romance: Girl Knight Story), also known as Walroma (ワルロマ, Waruroma) for short, is a Japanese eroge visual novel developed by the visual novel company Ricotta for Windows PCs. It is Ricotta's second visual novel after Princess Lover!. It was released on October 28, 2011. The game is described by the development team as a "romancing female knights ADV" (少女騎士恋愛ADV, shōjo kishi renai ADV). On August 9, 2012, Ricotta announced that a fandisc titled Walkure Romanze More&More was in production. The fandisc is scheduled for release in 2013. An anime television series adaptation titled Walkure Romanze, produced by Eight Bit and directed by Yūsuke Yamamoto, aired from October 6 to December 22, 2013.

== Plot ==
Walkure Romanze's story revolves around Takahiro Mizuno, a student studying at an academy with jousting as the main focus for sport. Takahiro acts as an advisor to the riders of the sport. Takahiro goes through each day tediously until the time of the annual competition draws near. Due to some odd circumstances, his childhood friend Mio Kisaki is challenged to a duel and she is forced to participate even though she has never even ridden a horse before. Takahiro agrees to train Mio as her Begleiter, but only until the duel is over. She later enrolls in the annual competition. She and the four other heroines all want Takahiro to become their Begleiter.

== Characters ==
Takahiro Mizuno (水野 貴弘, Mizuno Takahiro)
Voiced by: Seiichiro Yamashita (anime)
The protagonist of Walkure Romanze. Takahiro was a very good athlete in the junior competitions but has since left the scene due to an injury he incurred during a championship finals match.
Mio Kisaki (希咲 美桜, Kisaki Mio)
Voiced by: Berisa Matsuda (PC), Ai Shimizu (drama CD/anime)
A friend of Takahiro's and also lives quite close to him. Mio enjoys watching jousting competitions and strongly believes that Takahiro will eventually recover from his injury and return to competing. She has feelings for Takahiro.
Noel Marres Ascot (ノエル・マーレス・アスコット, Noeru Māresu Asukotto)
Voiced by: Ran Shimabara (PC), Eriko Nakamura (drama CD/anime)
Daughter of a marquess family. Her jousting skills are top class. Noel puts in all she has got into the competitions because she promised her younger sister that she would never lose when she is competing in front of her. She has feelings for Takahiro.
Mireille Marres Ascot (ミレイユ・マーレス・アスコット, Mireiyu Māresu Asukotto)
Voiced by: Noriko Shitaya
The younger sister of Noel Marres Ascot. When she was young, Mireille was injured in a jousting accident. After Mireille's operation was done successfully, she strangely did not show any signs of getting better. Later, she was forced to spend her life in a wheelchair. Noel attempted to give up the sport but Mireille implored her to continue as she didn't blame her for the event. Mireille told her sister to continue while she supported her all the way in her endeavors in jousting to which the latter promised to make Mireille happy.
Celia Cumani Aintree (スィーリア・クマーニ・エイントリー, Sīria Kumāni Eintorī)
Voiced by: Rino Kawashima (PC), Kei Mizusawa (drama CD/anime)
Celia was the winner of the jousting competitions during both her first and second year at the academy and is regarded as a prodigy in jousting. Celia also has excellent grades and has been the president of the student council for consecutive years. She has feelings for Takahiro.
Lisa Eostre (リサ・エオストレ, Risa Eosutore)
Voiced by: Koori Natsuno (PC), Hiroko Taguchi (drama CD/anime)
A first-year student at the academy but is regarded as a very promising rookie. She develops feelings for Takahiro. No one in the first year class is able to stand up to her.
Akane Ryūzōji (龍造寺 茜, Ryūzōji Akane)
Voiced by: Hitomi Nabatame
Mio's best friend at school. She has a great fondness for Celia, so much so that even saying her name causes her to lose focus. She started jousting at the age of five.

== Development ==
Walkure Romanze is Ricotta's second game, after their first game, Princess Lover!, released in 2008. The scenario for Walkure Romanze is being written by Hare Kitagawa, Takami Tanikawa, Hatsu, Natake, Octopus, assault and Orgel. Kitagawa's authoring credits include Akiiro Renka, Happiness! Re:Lucks, and Time Leap. The art and character designs were handled by Kei Komori, who also worked on Princess Lover!.

Due to the unusual jousting theme of the game and Komori's personal love for armour, the Ricotta staff had to do a lot of research. With regards to the game, the staff would like the player to pay close attention to how the sport of jousting brings the protagonist and the heroine together, and how the trust between the two slowly blossoms into love. They also stated that they originally had five heroines being designed but the number was later cut down to four.

=== Release history ===
Walkure Romanze was originally planned to be released in the winter of 2009 but has since been delayed to 2010. It was scheduled for June 24, 2011 but was then subsequently delayed to September 30, 2011.

== Adaptations ==
=== Manga ===
A manga adaptation, illustrated by Mitsu King, was serialized in ASCII Media Works' Dengeki Daioh between the May 2012 and July 2013 issues. Two tankōbon volumes were released: the first on November 27, 2012, and the second on August 27, 2013. A second manga, illustrated by Manoe Nagisa, was serialized in ASCII Media Works' Dengeki Hime between the July and November 2012 issues. A third manga, illustrated by No. Gomesu, started serialization in Kill Time Communication's Comic Valkyrie Web Edition in the second volume released on January 28, 2013. A fourth manga, titled Walkure Romanze: Noel Etoile and illustrated by Sawayoshi Azuma, began serialization in Dengeki Hime in the July 2013 issue.

=== Anime ===
An anime television series adaptation, produced by Eight Bit and directed by Yūsuke Yamamoto, aired from October to December 2013. The opening theme is "Un-Delayed" by Miyuki Hashimoto and the ending theme is "MoonRise Romance" by Natsuko Aso.

==== Episodes ====
No.	Title	Original release date
1	"The Flower Garden" "Sakura no En" (桜の園)	October 6, 2013
2	"Mio's Trials" "Mio no Shiren" (美桜の試練)	October 13, 2013
3	"The Morning of the Duel" "Kettō no Asa" (決闘の朝)	October 20, 2013
4	"What it Takes To Be a Knight" "Kishi no Shikaku" (騎士の資格)	October 27, 2013
5	"Girls Without Their Armour" "Yoroi o Nuida Shōjo-tachi" (鎧を脱いだ少女たち)	November 3, 2013
6	"Time Off in Helen's Hill" "Herenzuhiru no Kyūjitsu" (ヘレンズヒルの休日)	November 10, 2013
7	"Under The Windmill" "Kazaguruma no Shita de" (風車の下で)	November 17, 2013
8	"I Wish Upon A Shooting Star" "Nagareboshi ni Negau" (流れ星に願う)	November 24, 2013
9	"The Maidens Festival" "Otome-tachi no Saiten" (乙女たちの祭典)	December 1, 2013
10	"Clash" "Gekitō" (激闘)	December 8, 2013
11	"Where Victory Lies" "Shōri no Yukue" (勝利のゆくえ)	December 15, 2013
12	"When Summer Ends" "Natsu no Owari ni" (夏の終わりに)	December 22, 2013

== Music ==
The game's opening theme to Walkure Romanze is "Hontō no Yūki ni Kawaru Made" (本当の勇気に変わるまで) by Miyuki Hashimoto. The song is composed and arranged by Takagō Azuma. The ending theme is "Kibō no Hoshi (Hero)" (希望の星〜HERO〜) and is also sung by Hashimoto. The game also includes two insert songs by Sayaka Sasaki: "Shooting the future" and "Mind Squall".

== Reception ==
In Getchu.com's 2011 Bishōjo Game Awards (based on user votes), Walkure Romanze won first place in the Graphics category, second place in Ero, as well as 20th place overall. The game was also Getchu's fifth best selling game for 2011.
