= 9-Nine =

Japanese video game series

- Original cover
- Created by: Palette
Further information
Video game
9-Nine: Kokonotsu Kokonoka Kokonoiro
Developer	Palette
Publisher	JP: Palette; WW: Sekai Project
Genre	Eroge, visual novel
Platform	Windows, PlayStation 4, Nintendo Switch
Released	Windows: JP: April 28, 2017; WW: February 1, 2019; PlayStation 4, Nintendo Switch: JP: June 23, 2022
Video game
9-Nine: Sorairo Sorauta Soranooto
Developer	Palette
Publisher	JP: Palette; WW: Sekai Project
Genre	Eroge, visual novel
Platform	Windows, PlayStation 4, Nintendo Switch
Released	Windows: JP: April 27, 2018; WW: August 17, 2019; PlayStation 4, Nintendo Switch: JP: June 23, 2022
Video game
9-Nine: Haruiro Harukoi Harunokaze
Developer	Palette
Publisher	JP: Palette; WW: Sekai Project
Genre	Eroge, visual novel
Platform	Windows, PlayStation 4, Nintendo Switch
Released	Windows: JP: April 26, 2019; WW: September 1, 2020; PlayStation 4, Nintendo Switch: JP: June 23, 2022
Video game
9-Nine: Yukiiro Yukihana Yukinoato
Developer	Palette
Publisher	JP: Palette; WW: Sekai Project
Genre	Eroge, visual novel
Platform	Windows, PlayStation 4, Nintendo Switch
Released	Windows: JP: April 24, 2020; WW: March 20, 2021; PlayStation 4, Nintendo Switch: JP: June 23, 2022
Video game
9-Nine: Shinshō
Developer	Palette
Publisher	JP: Palette
Genre	Visual novel
Platform	Windows, PlayStation 4, Nintendo Switch
Released	Windows: JP: April 23, 2021; PlayStation 4, Nintendo Switch: JP: June 23, 2022
- Manga
- Written by: Palette
- Illustrated by: Izumi Kawachi
- Published by: Futabasha
- Magazine: Gaugau Monster
- Original run: October 22, 2021 – present
- Volumes: 2
- Anime television series

9-Nine: Ruler's Crown
- Directed by: Koichi Ohata
- Written by: Kōsuke Koremizu
- Music by: Yamazo
- Studio: PRA
- Original network: Tokyo MX, BS NTV
- Original run: July 5, 2025 – September 27, 2025
- Episodes: 13
- Video game

As:9-Nine: Arteisia
- Developer: Palette
- Publisher: JP: Palette
- Genre: Eroge, visual novel
- Platform: Windows
- Released: JP: June 26, 2026
- icon

9-Nine is a Japanese adult visual novel series developed and published by Palette. It was released for Windows in four episodes from April 2017 to April 2020, with a final episode released in April 2021. It was later ported to the PlayStation 4 and Nintendo Switch in June 2022. An English version of the visual novels was released by Sekai Project from February 2019 to March 2021. An all-aged extra episode was released in April 2021. A manga adaptation with art by Izumi Kawachi has been serialized online via Futabasha's Gaugau Monster website since October 2021. An anime television series adaptation produced by PRA, titled 9-Nine: Ruler's Crown, aired from July to September 2025. A spin-off to the visual novels, As:9-Nine: Arteisia, was released in June 2026.

== Plot ==
Shiromitsugawa City is a sleepy college town consisting of various high schools. Living by himself away from his family, Kakeru Niimi enjoys a peaceful life as an ordinary student until a major earthquake shatters the sacred artifact at the local Hakuda Tsukumo Shrine.

In the wake of this event, where Kakeru's world is now connected to an alternate world, artifacts that awaken superhuman abilities begin to show up in young men and women in the town, and one such Artifact User emerges as a serial killer.

Kakeru is approached by his classmate Miyako Kujo to track down this serial killer, and in doing so, becomes embroiled in the ensuing chaos between the Artifact Users.

9-nine - Kokonotu Kokonoka Kokonoiro

The first instalment in the series focuses on the first of the four heroines, Miyako Kujo. After finding a petrified human in their college town, Shiromitsugawa City, Kakeru and Miyako work together to investigate the culprit behind this incident. This game can be played on its own without knowledge of the other series instalments.

9-nine - Sorairo Sorauta Soranooto

The second instalment in the series focuses on the second heroine, Sora Niimi. The story branches off from the first game, Kokonotsu Kokonoka Kokonoiro, and focuses instead on the romance between Kakeru and his sister Sora while they work with Miyako to track down the Artifact User petrifying people in the town. This game can be played on its own without knowledge of the other series instalments.

9-nine - Haruiro Harukoi Harunokaze

The third instalment in the series focuses on the third heroine, Haruka Kosaka. The story branches off from the second game, Sorairo Sorauta Soranooto, and focuses on the budding romance between Kakeru and Haruka. Kakeru's group runs into the Artifact User organisation Rig Veda, who appear to oppose their efforts to investigate the serial killings. This game can be played on its own without knowledge of the other series instalments.

9-nine - Yukiiro Yukihana Yukinoato

The fourth instalment in the series focuses on the final heroine, Noa Yuki, branching off from the third game, Haruiro Harukoi Harunokaze. Having uncovered the mastermind behind the incidents, and realizing Noa's Artifact is the key to defeating the mastermind, Kakeru divulges everything he knows about the matter. Together, they oppose the mastermind and uncover the final secrets behind the Artifacts that arrived in their world.

Due to the story structure of this game, it is strongly recommended that this game be played only after completing the previous three games.

9-nine - Shinsho

The final instalment in the series ties up loose ends from the previous four chapters with after-story scenes for each heroine. There is a new scenario featuring a story that is yet to find salvation, the final, unfinished task Kakeru has yet to complete.

It is strongly recommended that this game be played only after completing all previous games.

== Characters ==
Kakeru Niimi (新海 翔, Nīmi Kakeru)
Voiced by: Atsushi Abe
Miyako Kujō (九條 都, Kujō Miyako)
Voiced by: Misato Fukuen
Sora Niimi (新海 天, Nīmi Sora)
Voiced by: Atsumi Tanezaki
Haruka Kōsaka (香坂 春風, Kōsaka Haruka)
Voiced by: Yuri Yamaoka
Noa Yūki (結城 希亜, Yūki Noa)
Voiced by: Akane Fujita
Sophitia (ソフィーティア, Sofītia)
Voiced by: Satomi Arai
Satsuki Naruse (成瀬 沙月, Naruse Satsuki)
Voiced by: Hana Takeda
Yoichi Fukazawa (深沢 与一, Fukazawa Yoichi)
Voiced by: Kazutomi Yamamoto
Renya Takamine (高峰 蓮夜, Takamine Renya)
Voiced by: Tomokazu Sugita

== Other media ==
=== Manga ===
A manga adaptation illustrated by Izumi Kawachi began serialization on Futabasha's Gaugau Monster website on October 22, 2021. The manga's chapters have been collected into two tankōbon volumes as of July 2025.

No.	Release date	ISBN
1	July 3, 2025	978-4-575-44095-9
2	July 3, 2025	978-4-575-44096-6

=== Anime ===
An anime television series adaptation was announced on May 29, 2024. Titled 9-Nine: Ruler's Crown, the series is produced by PRA and directed by Koichi Ohata, with series composition handled by Kōsuke Koremizu, characters designed by Saori Sakiguchi, and music composed by Yamazo. The cast from previous games reprised their roles. The series aired from July 5 to September 27, 2025, on Tokyo MX and BS NTV. The opening theme song is "ResoNAnce", performed by Araki, while the ending theme song is "Pale Blaze", performed by Chihiro Yonekura.

==== Episodes ====
No.	Title	Directed by (Note: Production staff information is taken from the ending credits of each episode.)	Written by	Storyboarded by	Original release date
1	Branch 01	Yoshitaka Koyama	Kiyoko Yoshimura	Koichi Ohata	July 5, 2025 (Note: Episodes 1 and 2 premiered back-to-back.)
2	Branch 02	Naoki Hishikawa	Kiyoko Yoshimura	Koichi Ohata	July 5, 2025
3	Branch 03	Ryō Ōkubo	Fuka Ishii	Koichi Ohata	July 12, 2025
4	Branch 04	Harume Kosaka	Fuka Ishii	Harume Kosaka	July 19, 2025
5	Branch 05	Shiho Takahashi	Hiro Akizuki	Katsuhiko Nishijima	July 26, 2025
6	Branch 06	Naoki Hishikawa	Hiro Akizuki	Shin Katagai	August 2, 2025
7	Branch 07	Ryō Ōkubo	Hiro Akizuki	Koichi Ohata	August 9, 2025
8	Branch 08	Harume Kosaka	Hiro Akizuki	Harume Kosaka	August 16, 2025
9	Branch 09	Youhei Honma	Kiyoko Yoshimura	Koichi Ohata	August 30, 2025
10	Branch 10	Arai Masaki	Fuka Ishii	Koichi Ohata	September 6, 2025
11	Branch 11	Naoki Hishikawa	Fuka Ishii	Koichi Ohata	September 13, 2025
12	Branch 12	Ryō Ōkubo	Kiyoko Yoshimura	Koichi Ohata	September 20, 2025
13	Branch 13	Yoshitaka Koyama	Kiyoko Yoshimura	Koichi Ohata	September 27, 2025
