= Sakura Strasse =

2008 video game

- Developer: Palette
- Publisher: Palette
- Platform: Windows 2000/XP/Vista
- Release: January 25, 2008
- Genres: Eroge, Visual novel
- Mode: Single player

Sakura Strasse (さくらシュトラッセ, Sakura Shutorasse) is an eroge visual novel developed by Palette for Windows as a DVD. It was released on January 25, 2008. Sakura Strasse is Palette's seventh game. "Sakura" means cherry blossom in Japanese and "Strasse" means street in German. Its opening theme "Himitsu Recipe" (lit. "Secret Recipe") was sung by Miyuki Hashimoto and was included in her album Brilliant Moment.

Kusukusu provided the art for the game. There was the internet radio show Homerarete Nobiru Radio PP: Sakura Strasse Tokubetsuhen. There was a limited CD, which recorded the program, on the correspondence sales.

On April 1, 2010, the subscription sales of light-emitting diode (LED) adaptation of the characters began. It costs ¥1,480. The light was reported to be the world's first full-scale moe LED light.

An anime television series adaptation of Sakura Strasse was announced in January 2009, but has since been delayed since 2010, with no signs of continuing production.

== Plot ==
In the small shopping street called "Sakura Strasse", there is a European Food Restaurant "Kamome Tei". Harumi Ayase was born as an eldest son of the manager of the restaurant. After his father died, his mother managed the restaurant, but she came down with an illness. He attempts to become a chef, but he is unskilled. At that time, German witch Marie Rudel accidentally meet Harumi.

== Characters ==
Harumi Ayase (綾瀬 春美, Ayase Harumi)
Harumi is the main protagonist of the game.
Marie Rudel (マリー・ルーデル, Marī Rūderu) Voiced by: Fūri Samoto
Marie is the main heroine, is a Witch, German and a fan of Japanese manga and anime.
Yuka Ayase (綾瀬 優佳, Ayase Yūka) Voiced by: Kazane
Yuka is an elder sister-in-law of Harumi.
Karin Satomura (里村 かりん, Satomura Karin) Voiced by: Mio Ōkawa
Karin is an old friend of Harumi.
Lulli (ルゥリィ, Rūrī) Voiced by: Honoka Imuraya
Lulli is a familiar of Marie.
