= Hoshizora no Memoria =

Japanese visual novel

- Hoshizora no Memoria: Wish Upon A Shooting Star
- Box art of the visual novel

星空のメモリア-Wish upon a shooting star-
- Genre: Romance, Drama, Sci-fi; Supernatural, Mystery
- Video game
- Developer: Favorite, Crossnet
- Genre: Visual novel, Eroge
- Platform: Windows
- Released: JP: March 27, 2009; NA: December 18, 2017

Hoshizora no Memoria: Wish Upon A Shooting Star (Japanese: 星空のメモリア -Wish upon a shooting star-, Hepburn: lit. "Memoria of the Starry Sky: Wish Upon A Shooting Star") is the fifth visual novel developed by Favorite. Before the game was released, a Prologue Trial Edition was released to the public on 27 February 2009; the standard version of the game was released on 27 March 2009. A fandisk titled Hoshizora no Memoria -Eternal Heart- which contained two extra routes was released on 29 January 2010; both the standard game and the fandisk were sold together in Hoshizora no Memoria Complete, released 26 November 2010. Sekai Project announced an English localization of the game, which was released on December 18, 2017 on Steam. A Sekai Project translation of Eternal Heart was released to steam on Nov 18th, 2022.

== Plot ==
=== Main Story ===
After their mother dies of an illness, high schooler You Kogasaka and his younger half-sister Chinami move back to their childhood hometown of Hibarigasaki to live with their aunt, Shino. Their return prompts You to recall his childhood, when he spent the evenings playing by a lookout with a white-haired girl. Upset at You moving away, the girl made a promise with him to return and marry her one day. Upon returning to Hibarigasaki years later, You locates the now fenced-off lookout, whereupon he encounters a mysterious girl who looks exactly like his childhood friend did seven years ago. She introduces herself as Mare, and tells You that she has been waiting for him for a long time. You points out her unusual clothing and large scythe, and describes her as a shinigami, a name she takes upon herself. Later, while You is visiting Mare at the lookout, she tells him to close his eyes, then stabs him in the chest with her scythe. While no blood is drawn or injury occurs, You forgets the name of his childhood friend, and Mare informs him that she has "reaped" his nightmare.

Meanwhile, back at school, You ends up joining the Astro Circle (Tenkuru), which is in desperate need of new members and has been demoted from an official club to a hobby circle. Its members include Asuho Minahoshi, the daughter of a local cafe owner, Kosame Hisakaki, the younger twin sister of student council member Komomo Hisakaki, and club president Haruto Okaizumi, along with third-year student Suwa Setsuna, who rarely comes to club meetings. Setsuna is implied to be investigating the lookout where Mare appears, for unknown reasons. The Astro Circle eventually recruit You's neighbor Isuzu Aoi by recreating the southern night sky in a homemade planetarium, due to Isuzu loving the southern constellations, resulting in their elevation to official club status.

While visiting the lookout with one evening, You, Chinami, and Mare are attacked by an unseen figure, implied to be Setsuna. Chinami is knocked unconscious but recovers; subsequently, the attacker texts You and asks to meet him at the lookout. The attacker is revealed to have been Kosame, whose intent is to eliminate Mare, whom she describes as an "illusory dream." However, before she is successful, Komomo intervenes, and Kosame later apologizes for her actions, which You forgives.

Hoshizora no Memoria features seven alternate endings depending on the player's choices throughout the game, all of which begin after Kosame's attack.

=== Character Endings ===
In Asuho's route, Asuho confesses her love for You, but as the two begin dating, she is held back by her fear that You loves the lookout girl from his memories more than her. Asuho, who also knew You in his childhood, has kept with her a Tanabata card written by You on which he wished to reunite with Yume, the lookout girl. Determined to prove that he loves Asuho more, You has Mare destroy the card and thus reap Asuho's nightmare.

In Komomo's route, it is revealed that Kosame is in fact not properly human, but is an illusory dream of similar nature to Mare. Kosame died in an accident at the lookout during her childhood (explaining why the lookout is fenced off), prompting a grief-stricken Komomo to use her powers as a shrine maiden to give her new form as an illusory dream, using the shrine's sacred object, a meteorite, as her host object. Kosame is revealed to have attacked Mare in order to protect Suwa, and furthermore is the one who requested that Suwa be sent to Hibarigasaki, in order to eliminate Kosame herself. However, Suwa, who has grown to care for Kosame, ultimately refuses to carry out her task. Kosame then asks Mare to send her back using her scythe, but You and Komomo intervene. Komomo instead asks Mare to reap her own nightmare, which turns out to be Kosame's ephemeral nature. As a result, she is able to remain in human form.

In Kosame's route, it is revealed that she is unable to retain a physical form while under the light of the full moon. When You discovers this, Kosame expresses sadness about her unreal nature and explains that they can never be together, but You, unable to accept this, is able to cause Kosame's physical form to return. However, Kosame, still unable to accept that she is anything but a ghost destined to disappear at any time, ultimately asks Mare to eliminate her. Mare, however, criticizes her for this and points out that You would be grief-stricken if she were to depart. To prove this, Mare instructs Kosame to vanish, then tells You that she has "returned." You, seeing through Mare's deception, borrows her scythe and cuts his wrists, causing him to enter an oneiroid state that allows him to perceive of Kosame, who tearfully recognizes You's love for her and decides to stay. You is later taken to a hospital, during which time he has a vision of his mother, Kasumi, who says she no longer needs to watch over him.

In Isuzu's route, You learns that she was in fact raised in Australia, but moved to Hibarigasaki with her parents due to her younger sister Suzuha's fragile health. Isuzu, devastated after moving away from her childhood home, began to visit the Hibarigasaki science center to see planetarium shows of the southern night sky. After the science center closed down, its director gifted Isuzu with an old telescope, along with a key to Hibari High's rooftop, so she could continue stargazing. While stargazing one night with Chinami and Suzuha, Isuzu and You are visited by Mare, who recognizes Isuzu's "nightmare" and reaps it with her scythe, causing the telescope to fall apart in Chinami's arms. Isuzu blames Chinami for breaking the telescope and stops talking to her, which results in You seemingly distancing himself from Isuzu as well. However, Chinami and You later give the repaired telescope back to Isuzu, revealing that they worked together to fix it in order to mend their friendship. Isuzu forgives Chinami, and reconciles with You as well. Years later, You takes Isuzu to Ayers Rock in Australia to see the southern night sky once again.

In Chinami's route, Chinami and You, along with their friend Mirai Asuka - the president of the Occult Circle of which Chinami is a member - perform stakeouts at Hibari High to investigate reports of a ghost which plays music on the upper floors. While investigating alone one night, Chinami and You recognize the sound of the mysterious music as a song composed by Chinami's late father, Chihiro. The player then learns that the music is coming from a music box under secret repair by Taiga, You's father, along with the astral deity Ren, whom Taiga has asked to watch over Chinami. It is revealed that in the past, Kasumi and Chihiro were lovers, but due to his poor health, Chihiro asked Ren to erase Kasumi's memories of him. Kasumi then married Taiga, giving birth to You; however, after learning of Ren's actions, Taiga divorced Kasumi out of guilt, and Kasumi returned to Chihiro, giving birth to Chinami. Chihiro later died from his illness, prompting Kasumi to move away from Hibarigasaki. As she becomes intimate with You, Chinami is able to reconcile with her past, and the two of them later work up the courage to introduce themselves to Taiga and Ren.

=== True Ending ===
After each individual route's completion, a mysterious girl begins to encounter You in each subsequent playthrough; You eventually recognizes her as the lookout girl, but is unable to approach her. In the true route, Asuho confesses to You but You turns her down, after which she reveals to him the name of the lookout girl: Yume. You's friends then work together to find the lookout girl; their search ends when Setsuna reveals that there is a patient the Hisakakis' father's hospital by the name of Yume Ototsu. You begins to visit Yume, who at first pretends not to remember him from their childhood. The two later sneak out with aid from Asuho, Kosame, and Komomo, visiting the lookout together, where Yume is able to get You to express his true feelings of grief from over the years. After this, You and Yume continue to see one another, but eventually Yume asks Mare to reap You's memories of her. Mare complies, and subsequently vanishes. Years later, You visits the lookout and encounters Yume, which causes him to faintly remember their history. You is able to communicate with his mother's spirit, who tells him she will help him reunite with Yume.

The game then reverts to just after You and Yume first visited the lookout together. You visits Mare, who attempts to cheer him up by stripping naked, but You rejects her advances. Later on, Yume begins to succumb to her illness, and writes a final farewell to You. It is also revealed that Yume has been communicating with Chihiro's ghost, whom only she is able to perceive due to her illness. Later on, Mare asks You to reap her with her scythe, as she came into existence due to the wishes made by You and Yume; by returning her "light" to them, You will gain the power to help Yume survive. You reluctantly complies and reaps Mare. Years later, Mare is reborn as Mea, the daughter of You and Yume, and the family visit the lookout together under Hibarigasaki's starry sky.

=== Secret Ending ===
Mare's route is unlocked only after completing Yume's. In this route, You accepts Mare's feelings after she strips for him in the second timeline of Yume's route, and the two have sex. You later takes Mare on a date to visit Yume, and the two return to You's house and enjoy dinner with his family. You then realizes Mare is forcing herself to retain her form at daytime, and he promptly embraces her, promising that he will always be with her. Mare expresses a desire to marry You and someday visit the stars with him, so she can introduce him to her family.

== Gameplay ==
Average dialogue and narrative in Hoshizora no Memoria depicting the main character You talking to Mare.

Hoshizora no Memoria is a romance visual novel in which the player assumes the role of Kogasaka You. Much of its gameplay is spent on reading the story's narrative and dialogue. The text in the game is accompanied by character sprites, which represent who You is talking to, over background art. Throughout the game, the player encounters CG artwork at certain points in the story, which take the place of the background art and character sprites. When the game is completed at least once, a gallery of the viewed CGs, played background music, and the "memory mode" which allows the player to experience to re-play the game's erotic scenes, become available in the game's album. Hoshizora no Memoria follows a branching plot line with multiple endings, and depending on the decisions that the player makes during the game, the plot will progress in a specific direction.

There are seven plot lines the player will have the chance to experience, each of them centered around You's romance with one of the girls. Throughout gameplay, the player is given multiple options to choose from, and text progression pauses at these points until a choice is made. To view all plot lines in their entirety, the player will have to replay the game multiple times and choose different choices to further the plot to an alternate direction. When first playing the game, only the scenarios for Asuho, Isuzu, and Komomo are available. To access Chinami's route, Isuzu's route must be completed, to access Kosame's route, Komomo's route must be completed. To access Yume's route, all previous routes must be completed, and to access Mare's route, Yume's route must be completed.

== Main characters ==
You Kogasaka (小河坂 洋, Kogasaka You)
Voiced by: none

The protagonist of the story. After living in the city for years, he and his sister Chinami move back to their smaller hometown of Hibarigasaki. He remembers a promise he made with a girl when he was a child and now he is trying to find her. He joins the Astro Circle and gets a job working at a restaurant called the Milky Way, which is where Asuho lives.

Asuho Minahoshi (南星 明日歩, Minahoshi Asuho)
Voiced by: Fūri Samoto

The vice-president of the astronomy club who always seems to clash with the student council at Hibari High (Hibari-Kou). She is a maid waitress at the Milky Way, which is owned by her father. She has had feelings for You since she was a child but has hidden her feelings from him.

Isuzu Aoi (蒼 衣鈴, Aoi Isuzu)
Voiced by: Karin Azuma

Kogasaka's neighbor and a first year at Hibari High. Shy and somewhat cold, she dislikes the Kogasakas at first (even sending them death threats), however she slowly opens up and becomes friends with You and Chinami. She has an interest in tarot cards and the supernatural. She is originally from Australia and she longs for the southern starry sky in her memories.

Komomo Hisakaki (姫榊 こもも, Hisakaki Komomo)
Voiced by: Yuana Miyazawa

The elder of the Hisakaki twins and a member of the student council. She tends to have a tsundere personality and hates the stars for unknown reasons. In the beginning she tries to get the Astro Circle abolished, and wants to recruit You in the student council. She often gets into arguments with Asuho. She is a shrine maiden at the Seitengu, which worships a hoshigami (star god).

Kosame Hisakaki (姫榊 こさめ, Hisakaki Kosame)
Voiced by: Suzune Kusunoki

The younger of the Hisakaki twins. She has a calm and mysterious personality and often randomly takes sides in arguments. Like her sister, she is also a shrine maiden.

Chinami Kogasaka (小河坂 千波, Kogasaka Chinami)
Voiced by: Ren Minazuki (Wish upon a Shooting Star), Yukina Fujimori (Eternal Heart)

You's little sister. She often refers to herself as Chinami and tends to talk in third person at the same time, behaving in an energetic manner. Extremely childish and immature, she tends to drive her older brother crazy.

Mare S. Ephemeral (メア=S=エフェメラル, Mare=S=Ephemeral)
Voiced by: Mitsu Anzu

She calls herself a shinigami (the label that You gave her), and "reaps" people's nightmares. Shortly after meeting You, she stabs him with her scythe causing him to forget the name of the lookout girl, whom she resembles.

Yume Ototsu (おとつ ゆめ, Ototsu Yume)
Voiced by: Soyogi Tōno

The girl that You met at the lookout. She has an illness that caused her to be sent to the city for treatment, however she returned to Hibarigasaki years later.

== Minor characters ==
Suwa Setsuna
Voiced by: Fujiko Ito

A shrine maiden and cousin of the Hisakakis, she works for the main branch of the Seitengu and was dispatched to Hibarigasaki in order to send off a spirit.

Haruto Okaizumi
Voiced by: Fami Aizawa

A 3rd-year student and president of the Astro Circle. He has a tendency to yell "Shiiiiiiiit!!!!" when something upsets him, such as when Komomo threatens to abolish the Astro Circle or when she flings away flyers during recruitment sessions. He has a split personality named Toudou who, in contrast to Haruto is very brash and has no interest in astronomy. Haruto has a goal of becoming an astronomer at NASA some day.

Souichirou Minahoshi
Voiced by: Shoto Elsa

He is the father of Asuho and owner of the Milky Way. He is the former president of the Astronomy club, and he worked as an astronomer at the Science Society before it was closed down.

Mirai Asuka
Voiced by: Tatsuya Hirai

A second-year student at Hibari High and friend of You's. He is the president of the Occult Circle (Okaken). Originally the one and only member, he and You try and recruit Chinami into their respective clubs, she ends up joining the Occult Circle.

Suzuha Aoi
Voiced by: Mimoe Usami

A 3rd-grader and the younger sister of Isuzu. She is very shy and is easily frightened by strangers. She is chronically ill which often causes her to miss school for long periods of time. Her parents were forced to return to Japan because her body couldn't handle Australia's harsh desert climate.
