= Akane Fujita =

Japanese voice actress

- 藤田 茜
- Born: January 26, 1993 (age 33); Shizuoka Prefecture, Japan
- Occupation: Voice actress
- Years active: 2013–present
- Agent: Ken Production
- Notable work: Eromanga Sensei as Sagiri Izumi; Akashic Records of Bastard Magic Instructor as Sistine Fibel; Senran Kagura as Senkō; Genshin Impact as Sucrose; Seirei Gensouki: Spirit Chronicles as Celia Claire

Akane Fujita (藤田 茜, Fujita Akane; born January 26, 1993) is a Japanese voice actress from Shizuoka Prefecture. She is affiliated with Ken Production. After passing an audition in 2011, she made her debut as a voice actress in 2012, and she played her first main role in 2016. She is known for her roles as Sagiri Izumi in Eromanga Sensei, Sistine Fibel in Akashic Records of Bastard Magic Instructor, and Celia Claire in Seirei Gensouki: Spirit Chronicles.

== Life and career ==
Fujita had an interest in voice acting since at least her junior high school years, since she had regularly been watching anime, and she had friends who were anime and voice actor fans. According to her, one reason she decided to become a voice actor was because she "wanted to do something that was fun". During her high school years, she was a part of her school's broadcasting club. As a third-year student, she participated in a national broadcasting competition sponsored by NHK. In 2011, she decided to participate in an audition organized by the agency Ken Production. She passed the audition, and pursued studies at a voice acting training school while also pursuing university studies.

Fujita made her voice acting debut in 2012, voicing the character Yuri in the video game Generation of Chaos: Pandora's Reflection. She would then play a number of supporting roles in anime series such as Aikatsu!, Chihayafuru, Magical Warfare, and Pokémon XY & Z. In 2015, she voiced Yukari Mizumoto in The Idolmaster Cinderella Girls and Megumi Uda in High School Fleet. She was also cast as the character Sagiri Izumi in an online radio drama adaptation of the light novel series Eromanga Sensei.

In 2016, she made her adult game voice acting debut with Tayutama 2: You're the Only One, under the name "Kanako" (夏和小).

In 2017, Fujita reprised the role of Sagiri in the anime television series adaptation of Eromanga Sensei. She also performed the song "Natsuiro Koi Hanabi" (夏色恋花火), which was used as the ending theme for the series' eighth episode. That same year, she was cast as the character Sistine Fibel in the anime series Akashic Records of Bastard Magic Instructor; she and co-stars Yume Miyamoto and Ari Ozawa performed the series' ending theme "Precious You". She also played the roles of Leviathan in the anime series Seven Mortal Sins and Kaiko Mikuniyama in the anime series A Sister's All You Need. She performed the song "Levi no Recipe" (レヴィのレシピ, Revi no Reshipi), which was used as an insert song in the second episode of Seven Mortal Sins, and the song "Innocent Lovely" (イノセント・ラブリー), which was used as the ending theme to the ninth episode of A Sister's All You Need. In 2018, she voiced Fū Sagami in Release the Spyce.

== Voice roles ==
=== Anime television series ===
| Year | Title | Role | Note | Ref. |
|---|---|---|---|---|
| 2012–6 | Aikatsu! | Akane Mimori | | |
| 2012–6 | Aikatsu! | Shizuka Kisaki | | |
| 2012–6 | Aikatsu! | Minami Hateruma | | |
| 2013 | Chihayafuru 2 | Napa Payakaroon | | |
| 2013 | Chihayafuru 2 | female student | | |
| 2013 | Heroes: Legend of the Battle Disks | Sophie | | |
| 2014 | Magical Warfare | Ida Futaba | | |
| 2015 | Death Parade | Sae | | |
| 2015 | Pokémon XY & Z | Bara | | |
| 2015 | The Idolmaster Cinderella Girls | Yukari Mizumoto | | |
| 2016 | High School Fleet | Megumi Uda/Megu-chan | | |
| 2016 | Orange | Kakeru Naruse (young) | | |
| 2016 | Orange | child | | |
| 2016 | Orange | female student | | |
| 2016 | Mahou Shoujo Nante Mouiidesukara | Yuzuka Hanami | | |
| 2017 | Akashic Records of Bastard Magic Instructor | Sistine Fibel | | |
| 2017 | Eromanga Sensei | Sagiri Izumi | | |
| 2017 | Seven Mortal Sins | Envy Demon Lord Leviathan | | |
| 2017 | A Sister's All You Need | Kaiko Mikuniyama | | |
| 2018 | Release the Spyce | Fū Sagami | | |
| 2018 | Inazuma Eleven: Ares no Tenbin | Tsukushi Ootani | | |
| 2018 | Senran Kagura: Shinovi Master | Senkō | | |
| 2019 | W'z | Haruka | | |
| 2019 | Mini Toji | Kiyoka Musumi | | |
| 2019 | A Certain Scientific Accelerator | Leader | | |
| 2020 | A Certain Scientific Railgun T | Leader | | |
| 2020 | Iwa-Kakeru! Sport Climbing Girls | Akane Uchimura | | |
| 2021 | Bottom-tier Character Tomozaki | Tsugumi Narita | | |
| 2021 | Osamake | Midori Shida | | |
| 2021 | How Not to Summon a Demon Lord Ω | Babaron | | |
| 2021 | Seirei Gensouki: Spirit Chronicles | Celia Claire | | |
| 2023 | Chillin' in My 30s After Getting Fired from the Demon King's Army | Marika | | |
| 2024 | A Salad Bowl of Eccentrics | Noa Minakami | | |
| 2025 | Mobile Suit Gundam GQuuuuuuX | Comoli Harcourt | | |
| 2025 | 9-Nine: Ruler's Crown | Noa Yūki | | |
| 2025 | Dekin no Mogura | Shio Inukai | | |
| 2025 | Inexpressive Kashiwada and Expressive Oota | Kashiwada-san | | |
| 2026 | Jack-of-All-Trades, Party of None | Shion Nasturtium | | |
| 2026 | Champignon Witch | Cat Witch | | |
| 2027 | Shin Oishinbo | Mariko Niki | | |

=== Anime film ===
| Year | Title | Role | Note | Ref. |
|---|---|---|---|---|
| 2020 | High School Fleet: The Movie | Megumi Uda | | |

=== Video games ===
She sometimes credited as "Kanako" (夏和小).

| Year | Title | Role | Credited as | Note | Ref. |
|---|---|---|---|---|---|
| 2012 | Generation of Chaos: Pandora's Reflection | Yuri | | | |
| 2014 | Tokyo 7th Sisters | Rena Araki | | | |
| 2014 | Granblue Fantasy | Renie | | | |
| 2015 | The Idolmaster Cinderella Girls Starlight Stage | Yukari Mizumoto | Akane Fujita | | |
| 2016 | Aikatsu! Photo on Stage | Minami Hateruma | Akane Fujita | | |
| 2016 | Girls' Frontline | G36C | | | |
| 2016 | Girls' Frontline | Five-seveN | | | |
| 2016 | Tayutama 2: You're the Only One | Mito Kohaku | Kanako | | |
| 2017 | Infinite Stratos: Archetype Breaker | Fanil Comet | Akane Fujita | | |
| 2017 | Shinobi Master Senran Kagura: New Link | Senkō | | | |
| 2017 | Tayutama 2: After Stories | Mito Kohaku | Kanako | | |
| 2017 | Soi Kano: Gyutto Dakishimete | Kumakura Yoake | Kanako | | |
| 2017 | 9-Nine Kokonotsu Kokonoka Kokonoiro | Noa Yūki | Kanako | | |
| 2018 | Dragon Quest builders 2 | Heroine | | | |
| 2018 | RIDDLE JOKER | Mibu Chisaki | Kanako | | |
| 2018 | 9-Nine Sorairo Sorauta Soranooto | Noa Yūki | Kanako | | |
| 2018 | Death end re;Quest | Lydia Nolan | Akane Fujita | | |
| 2018 | Kimi to Mezameru Ikutsuka no Houhou | Hirakata Hatsune | Kanako | | |
| 2018 | Sword Art Online: Memory Defrag | Makoto | Akane Fujita | | |
| 2019 | Arknights | Bibeak | Akane Fujita | | |
| 2019 | Arknights | Shamare | Akane Fujita | | |
| 2019 | Azur Lane | USS Shangri-La | Akane Fujita | | |
| 2019 | Azur Lane | USS Bataan | Akane Fujita | | |
| 2019 | 9-Nine Haruiro Harukoi Harunokaze | Noa Yūki | Kanako | | |
| 2019 | Sakura, Moyu. -As the Night's, Reincarnation- | Mashiro | Kanako | | |
| 2019 | Sakura, Moyu. -As the Night's, Reincarnation- | Kuro | Kanako | | |
| 2019 | Aonatsu Line | Kotone Shiino | Kanako | | |
| 2019 | pieces / Wataridori no Somnium | Kimihara Yua | Kanako | | |
| 2019 | Café Stella and the Reaper's Butterflies | Shiki Natsume | Kanako | | |
| 2020 | Genshin Impact | Sucrose | Akane Fujita | | |
| 2020 | 9-Nine Yuukiiro Yukihana Yukinoato | Noa Yūki | Kanako | | |
| 2020 | Death end re;Quest 2 | Lydia Nolan | Akane Fujita | | |
| 2020 | Girls Book Maker ~Grimm to Sannin no Ohime-sama 1~ | Shirayuki | Kanako | | |
| 2020 | Hacking the Moon to Find My Goddess | Tsukuyomi | Kanako | | |
| 2020 | pieces / Yurikago no Canaria | Kimihara Yua | Kanako | | |
| 2020 | Hyrule Warriors: Age of Calamity | Impa | | | |
| 2021 | Final Fantasy VII Remake Intergrade | Nayo | | | |
| 2022 | Luminous Avenger iX 2 | Vespa | | | |
| 2022 | Blue Archive | Miyako Tsukiyuki | | | |
| 2022 | Made in Abyss: Binary Star Falling into Darkness | Dorothea | | | |
| 2023 | Angelic☆Chaos RE-BOOT! | Tanikaze Amane | Kanako | | |
| 2024 | Goddess of Victory: Nikke | Trony | | | |
| 2026 | Zenless Zone Zero | Phoenix | | | |
| 2026 | Final Fantasy Resonance | Fina | | | |

=== Dubbing ===
- People Places Things, Clio
