= Ryōko Ono =

Japanese voice actress

- 小野 涼子
- Born: June 22, 1977 (age 49); Yokohama, Japan
- Other names: Nazuna Gogyō (五行 なずな, Gogyō Nazuna)
- Occupation: Voice actress
- Children: 1

Ryōko Ono (小野 涼子, Ono Ryōko; born June 22, 1977) is a Japanese voice actress. She is also known as Nazuna Gogyō (五行 なずな, Gogyō Nazuna) or Rikka Kitami (北見 六花, Kitami Rikka).

== Filmography ==
=== Anime ===
2004

- Kurau: Phantom Memory as Washima
- Otogi Zoshi as Daughter 2 (ep 2)
- Black Jack as Wato

2005

- Honey and Clover as Female Student C (ep 3)
- Trinity Blood as Jessica Lange
- To Heart 2 as Library committee member (ep 3)
- Immortal Grand Prix as Amy Stapleton

2006

- Witchblade as Aoi
- Tactical Roar as Honomi Tateyama; Yui Asarigi
- Futari wa Pretty Cure Splash Star as Hitomi Itō
- Digimon Savers as Nanami
- Ouran High School Host Club as Honoka Kimiwada; Maid A (ep 7,15)
- Zegapain as Irie
- Black Jack 21 as Wato
- Honey and Clover II as Announcer (ep 7)
- Marginal Prince as Joshua (Young)
- 009-1 as Bess (ep 8)
- Hataraki Man as Editor (ep 8)

2007

- Nodame Cantabile as Kaoru Suzuki
- Tokyo Majin Gakuen Kenpucho: Tou as Hinano Oribe; Female Reporter (ep 3)
- To Heart 2 as Sasara Kusugawa (ep 3)
- Bakugan Battle Brawlers as Lars Lion
- Sola as Touko Uehara
- Tokyo Majin Gakuen Kenpucho: Tou 2nd Act as Hinano Oribe
- Minami-ke as Atsuko
- Vassalord

2008

- Minami-ke: Okawari as Atsuko

2009

- Minami-ke: Okaeri as Atsuko
- Aoi Hana as Kawasaki Senpai
- Aki Sora as Kana Sumiya
- Fairy Tail as Mirajane Strauss, Lullaby, Angelica, Zeref (Ultear's disguise)

2010

- Sound of the Sky as Iliya Arkadia
- Ōkami-san to Shichinin no Nakamatachi as Ringo's Mother (ep 9)
- Yosuga no Sora as Kazuha Migiwa

2011

- Oretachi ni Tsubasa wa Nai as Hiyoko Tamaizumi
- Bakugan Battle Brawlers New Vestroia as Lars Lion
- Mashiroiro Symphony as Airi Sena

2012

- Smile PreCure! as Namie Sasaki

2013

- Minami-ke: Tadaima as Atsuko

2014

- Barakamon as Ikue Kōmoto
- D-Frag! as Takao's Older Sister (ep 8)
- Fairy Tail [TV-2] as Mirajane Strauss

=== Video games ===
==== Visual novels ====
Under the name Nazuna Gogyō.

- Friends as Mio Suzuya
- Hare Tokidoki Otenkiame as Rin
- Hoshi Ori Yume Mirai as Rikka Narusawa
- Izuna: Legend of the Unemployed Ninja as Fuuka
- Kamikaze Explorer! as Kotoha Okihara
- Manatsu no Yoru no Yuki Monogatari: Midsummer Snow Night as Kaede Haruno
- Mashiroiro Symphony as Airi Sena
- Noble Works as Sena Tsukiyama
- Oretachi ni Tsubasa wa Nai as Hiyoko Tamaizumi
- Princess Lover! as Erika Takezono
- Sekai Seifuku Kanojo as Ako Hananomiya
- Sono Hanabira ni Kuchizuke o as Kaede Kitajima
- Stellar Theater as Kaguya Himenomiya
- SuGirly Wish as Anna Tsukigase
- Yosuga no Sora as Kazuha Migiwa
- Kono Oozora ni, Tsubasa wo Hirogete as Amane Mochizuki
- Ao no Kanata no Four Rhythm as Reiko Satōin; credited as Rikka Kitami (PC game) and Ryōko Ono (PSV game)
- Fushigi Yūgi: Suzaku Ibun as Misaki Himuro (Priestess of Seiryuu)

==== Other games ====
- Arcana Heart 2 as Parace L'sia
- Azur Lane as Königsberg, Köln, Karlsruhe, and Leipzig
- Arknights as Robin
- Higan: Eruthyll as Eluya
