= Fūri Samoto =

Japanese voice actress

Fūri Samoto (佐本 二厘, Samoto Fūri), referred as Fūrin by fans, is a Japanese voice actress primarily for visual novels.

== Voice roles ==
2003

- Hajiome

2004

- Reminiscence Blue
- Raspberry
- Pussy Cat
- North Wind as Yukari Yanagi
- Sister Sister at Kasuminokouji Sana

2005

- Festa!! -Hyper Girls Pop- as Kotoko Kusakube
- Pure×Cure
- Happiness! Jun Watarase and Soprano
- Otome wa Boku ni Koishiteru as Takako Itsukushima

2006

- Yokobari Saboten as Ayane Nanatsuki
- Hapokuri
- Nanatsuiro Drops Sumomo Akihime
- Aozora no Mieru Oka as Mikoto Tachibana

2007

- Nutmeg as Hotori
- Katahane as Wakaba and Light Faure
- Dies irae (video game) as Ayase Kasumi

2008

- Sakura Strasse as Marie Rudel

2009

- Mashiroiro Symphony as Amaha Yuiko
- Hoshizora no Memoria -Wish upon a Shooting Star- as Minahoshi Asuho
- Hoshizora no Memoria -Eternal Heart- as Minahoshi Asuho
- Yoake Mae yori Ruriiro na -Moonlight Cradle- as Estel Freesia

2010

- Iro ni Ide ni Keri Waga Koi wa as Kikyou Tenjo
- Shukufuku no Campanella as Nina Lindberg
- Rui wa Tomo wo Yobu -Full Voice- as Wakutsu Tomo
- Rui wa Tomo wo Yobu Fan Disc -Asu no Mukou ni Mieru Kaze- as Wakutsu Tomo

2011

- Rui wa Tomo wo Yobu Drama CD -Nemurenu Mori no Ibara-hime- as Wakutsu Tomo
