= Harumi Sakurai =

Japanese voice actress

- 櫻井 浩美
- Born: October 21; Tokyo, Japan
- Occupations: Voice actress; narrator
- Years active: 2001–present
- Agent: Office Watanabe
- Height: 165 cm (5 ft 5 in)

Harumi Sakurai (櫻井 浩美, Sakurai Harumi, born October 21) is a Japanese voice actress and narrator. Some of her prominent roles are Saya Tokido in Little Busters!, Yuri Nakamura in Angel Beats!, Awaki Musujime in A Certain Magical Index, Lisanna Strauss in Fairy Tail and Sylphie Appleton in Argevollen.

== Filmography ==
=== Anime ===
List of voice performances in anime
Year	Series	Role	Notes	Source
2003	Pluster World	Deryi		
2004	Kyo Kara Maoh!	Sangria		
2005	The Law of Ueki	Kamui 'Shirokage' Rosso		
2005	Gunparade Orchestra	Azusa Hikomura		
2006	Tsuyokiss	Serebu Tachibana		
2008	H2O: Footprints in the Sand	Hayami Kohinata		
2008	Koihime Musō	Sonken Chūbō		
2009	Pandora Hearts	Dledlum		
2009	To Heart 2 Adplus	Silfa		
2009–19	Fairy Tail	Lisanna Strauss, Arana Webb		
2010	Angel Beats!	Yuri Nakamura		
2010	Bakuman	Ōtsuki Nanami		
2010	A Certain Magical Index II	Awaki Musujime		
2011	The Qwaser of Stigmata II	Miyuki Seta		
2011	Heaven's Memo Pad	Shoko Sakuma		
2011	Mashiroiro Symphony: The Color of Lovers	Pannya, Ranka Sena		
2012	Queen's Blade Rebellion	Luna Luna		
2012	Accel World	Nickel Doll		
2012	To Love Ru Darkness	Ryoko Mikado		
2013	The "Hentai" Prince and the Stony Cat.	Tsukasa Tsutsukakushi		
2013	High School DxD	Katerea Leviathan		
2013	Symphogear G	Otome Kaburagi, Ako Ōki		
2014	Little Busters EX	Saya Tokido		
2014	Nanana's Buried Treasure	Sansa Kurosu		
2014	Argevollen	Silfie Appleton		
2015	To Love Ru Darkness 2nd	Ryoko Mikado		
2018	A Certain Magical Index III	Awaki Musujime		
2021–22	Kaginado	Saya Tokido, Yuri Nakamura		
2022	The Devil Is a Part-Timer!!	Hinako Sasaki	Ep. 8 & 9	

=== Video games ===
List of voice performances in video games
Year	Title	Role	Notes	Source
2006	Yamiyo ni Sasayaku: Detective Kyouichirou Sagara	Nagisa Ishikawa		
2006	Hisui no Shizuku: Hiiro no Kakera 2	Mao Yasaka		
2006	Chaos Wars	Shelly, Karen		
2007	Under the Moon: Tsukiiro Ehon	Ashe		
2007	Record of Agarest War	Beatrice		
2008	H2O+	Hayami Kohinata		
2008	Doki Doki Majo Shinpan 2 Duo	Kureha Haori		
2008	Kimi no Yusha	Heim		
2008	The Shield of Aigis	Ren Tsubakihara		
	The Law of Ueki: Taosu ze Roberto Jūdan!!	Kamui Russo		
2019	Another Eden	Akane		
2020	Moe! Ninja Girls RPG	Nanao Kashima		
2024	Blue Archive	Kyougoku Satsuki		

=== Dubbing roles ===
- Care Bears – Good friend bear
- X-Men: Evolution – Kitty
