= List of Chibi Vampire characters =

The Chibi Vampire manga series and its light novel adaptation feature a cast of characters created by Yuna Kagesaki. The series takes place in a fictional Japan where vampires live amongst humans and are slowly dying out from lack of reproduction. Among them is Karin Maaka, an unusual vampire who does not drink blood but instead must inject it into others because her body produces too much. The youngest child in a family of vampires, Karin lives like a normal human teenager, attending school and walking in the daylight with no harm to herself. Her parents, Henry and Calera Maaka, along with her older brother Ren and younger sister Anju, worry about her unusual nature. At school Karin meets a new transfer student, the human Kenta Usui, with whom she becomes friends and later falls in love. After he learns her secret, he agrees to help Karin during the day when her vampire family is unable to watch over her. While the awkward couple deal with the issues of a relationship between a human and a vampire, they meet Yuriya Tachibana, a human-vampire hybrid sent by her uncle Glark to look for the "psyche" of vampires. The pair eventually kidnaps Karin, the "Spring of Psyche", and intending that all vampires drink her blood so that it may rejuvenate their species.The anime television adaptation features character designs by Yumi Nakayama and a slightly modified story. Yuriya, Glark and Bridget do not appear; instead, the Maaka family finds itself targeted by the Sinclair family of vampire hunters. Victor Sinclair wishes to destroy the family, blaming them for his family's "shame" because his ancestor Alfred Sinclair fell in love with Elda Maaka, Karin's grandmother. Victor blames Elda for loving Alfred and filling his life with sadness. Victor's grandson Winner initially aids him in his quest, but develops feelings for Karin who gave him confidence when he questioned his ability to follow his dreams.

== Protagonists ==
An embarrassed Karin in her manga and anime guises

=== Karin Maaka ===
Karin Maaka (真紅 果林, Maaka Karin) is descended from a long line of purebred vampires. However, instead of having to drink blood like normal vampires, Karin's body overproduces blood. Generally, once a month she reaches a point where she can no longer hold it in, and she must bite someone to inject them with her blood or else suffer from a massive nosebleed. In the anime, if Karin goes too long without biting someone and tries to hold her blood in, she enters a "berserker"-like state and aggressively attacks the first target she can find. Being near a person suffering misfortune causes Karin's blood to increase ahead of schedule. Due to her unusual situation, Karin lives like a normal human rather than a vampiress. She lives in the daylight, is not susceptible to common vampire weaknesses, and lacks the skills normal vampires have. These differences cause her to be somewhat separate from her parents and older brother, whom she only sees for a few hours in the time before she goes to sleep (she spends more time with her younger sister Anju, who has not yet awakened as a vampiress). In the first chapter Karin meets Kenta Usui and is dismayed that her blood increases around him. He has a lot of misfortune in his life. Karin resolves to do favors for him and thus reduce his misfortune and her blood problems around him. As the series progresses, Karin falls in love with Kenta. He returns her feelings, though Karin is initially troubled to learn that human-vampire children are born sterile.

Karin is rendered unconscious for several days after trying to hold in her blood and suffering a massive nosebleed, during which time her family grows increasingly concerned that her condition would kill her. Her mother journeys to her birthplace in search of answers and learns that Karin is a rare vampiress, called the "Spring of Psyche", that is born when the vampire species is struggling. The blood Karin produces can bestow fertility in other vampires. Karin is later kidnapped by vampires who want to feed from her to rejuvenate their own lives, though it will kill Karin in the process. They also plan to impregnate Karin against her will to continue the Psyche's existence. After Kenta and the Marker family save Karin from the Brownlicks, her nose-bleeding ceases, leaving her as though she were a normal human, who will likely grow old and die. Her family erases all of her memories of vampires, including themselves, promising Kenta that they will continue watching over her happiness although she will not know them. At the end of the series, Karin and Kenta have married and are shown to have a teenage daughter named Kanon.

In the anime adaptation, the blood-making issue and Karin's capture are not mentioned. Instead, Karin has the opportunity to become a full vampiress, which she initially declines, but then pursues after Kenta encourages her. The transformation is interrupted and Karin goes berserk. Kenta comes to her rescue by volunteering to be bitten, ending the berserker rage, confirming their romantic relationship. at the end of the anime she is still not a full vampiress and is still dealing with her blood-making issue, still has of all her memories and still lives with her family and spends much time with Kenta. In the anime television series, Karin Maaka is voiced by Sayuri Yahagi in Japanese and Chelsea Curto in English.

=== Kenta Usui ===
Kenta Usui (雨水 健太, Usui Kenta) is the first human to have found out Karin's secret. At Anju's suggestion, the Marker family makes him an ally to aid in caring for Karin during the daylight hours. Kenta and his mother live in a one-room apartment and do not have much money. Consequently, Kenta cannot afford three meals a day, often leaving him hungry during the middle of the day. Karin, realizing this, begins making him a bento box lunch every day. Kenta works with Karin part-time at Julian Restaurant, seeking all the extra hours he can to support himself and his mother. He dreams of being a model citizen with a family and a good job. As a child, he was ignored by his maternal grandmother due to the circumstances of his birth. This leads to his being a person who tries to live a life free of prejudice and allows him to sympathize with Karin's unusual nature. He offers his neck to Karin to bite whenever she needs so she won't have any more nosebleeds. Karin ends up biting him twice, with the second bite following their first kiss. (It was thanks to Maki and Sophia's encouragement th a Kenta opened his heart to love.) When Karin is kidnapped, Usui aids the Markers in tracking her down, led by Sophia Pistis, the spirit of the first Psyche. While they are there in Kenta's hometown and at Karin's suggestion, Kenta goes to see his sick grandmother, not wanting to lose the last chance to reconcile with her. After Karin's memories are modified by her family, Kenta, whose memories weren't erased, promises to keep her heritage a secret and to make her happy. At the end of the series, they are married with a child, the reincarnated spirit of Sophia. In the anime television series, Kenta Usui is voiced by Katsuyuki Konishi in Japanese and Yahav Rom in English. He also appears to work very hard for his family and their daughter apparently has a crush on Ren. Something that Kenta's oblivious about and annoys Karin. While being around Usui some bluntly point out that the way his eyes are creepy, which makes Usui feel annoyed or down.

== Antagonists ==
=== Yuriya Tachibana ===
Yuriya Tachibana (橘 友里耶, Tachibana Yuriya) is a half-vampire who first appears in the eighth volume of the series. She moves into Karin's town at the behest of her uncle Glark to seek out an unusual vampire. Because she is half-vampire, she can also walk in the sunshine and only has to feed once a month, however she is sterile and will never be able to have children. When Karin befriends her, Yuriya initially lies to her uncle and tries to protect her. She is nearly killed by Elda Marker after she is discovered. She later betrays Karin, reluctantly helping her uncle because her uncle means more to her than Karin does. They capture Karin so that she can be used as the Spring of Psyche. Yuriya, as a half-vampire, was mistrusted by full-fledged vampires because it was the half-vampires who had betrayed them in Europe and led the vampire hunting church against them two generations ago.

Later, Yuriya expresses remorse for her part in Karin's capture and helps her escape after seeing a vision of her mother, a by-product of coming into contact with Karin's blood months beforehand. After Karin is safe, Yuriya goes to find her uncle to ensure he finds safe shelter as the sun rises. Near the end of the series, Yuriya is living with her uncle again. She returns briefly to Karin's town, but only shows herself to Kenta out of concern that the hovering Markers would kill her if she tried to approach Karin directly. She asks Kenta to pass Karin a new cellphone to replace the one broken during Karin's kidnapping, before saying her goodbyes, noting that she will probably not see either of them again.

=== Bridget Brownlick ===
Bridget Brownlick (ブリジット・ブラウンリック, Burijitto Buraunrikku) is a powerful and ambitious vampire, of a powerful and ambitious vampire clan. When Glark offers her the Spring of Psyche, a vampire that produces blood which, if consumed by vampires, will increase fertility, she leaps at the chance. Her family has controlled the Psyche for many generations until James Marker convinced Cecilia Armash, whose family produces the Psyche every thousand years, to allow her daughter Calera to marry into the Marker family. After Karin is rescued, Ren detains Bridget so that Kenta and Karin may get away. Months after Karin's rescue, Bridget calls to let Ren know she is pregnant with his child, the first vampire child conceived since Anju Maaka. It's revealed by Karin, that Bridget gave birth to a son named Rei. Bridget also believes that her intimate time with Ren and her pregnancy means something more, as she had left Gilbert. And stated she wants him to be married to her, so they can raise their child. However, whether not wanting the responsibility of fatherhood or the shock, Ren wants nothing to do with her. And years later, its shown he's never had contact with them. Only years later does he reveal himself to his son, though only to protect Karin's daughter. Bridget thinks he's come to reunite and become lovers again, though he clearly is horrified at the idea of being with her.

=== Glark ===
Glark (グラーク, Gurāku), when he first enters the story, is an Osaka-based criminal, seen punishing two under-criminals for botching an assignment. He believed that conditions are ripe in the vampire community for the rebirth of the psyche. He aimed to identify her and then profit from that knowledge. He sent his niece Yuriya to Shiihaba City to check out the Markers and report any unusual vampires she saw. Since he hadn't given Yuriya a complete briefing or gotten her full buy-in, it took a while for Karin's name to get back to him. He then contacted the highest vampire clan, the Brownlicks, and Bridget Brownlick came to take Karin. He knew that the vampires, in their greed, would drain Karin of her blood to restore their fertility, so he sought to get first in line, as well as taking the forethought to have her forcefully impregnated to ensure the creation of another Psyche. This is thwarted by the Marker family who rescued Karin and prevented anything happening to her. After a fierce battle with Henry Marker, (with assistance from Elda Marker) Glark is left behind to die in the sunlight but is luckily saved from being caught in the sun by Yuriya. Afterward, he contacts Henry to see if they can find a way to use Karin's blood without harming her, but is informed that she is no longer producing excess blood.

=== Victor Sinclair ===
Victor Sinclair (ヴィクター・シンクレア, Vikutā Shinkurea), a character created for the anime adaptation, is Winner's grandfather. Disgusted by his ancestor's seduction, which he blames for his family's exile from society, he holds a strong grudge against all vampires, particularly the Markers. An expert hunter and skilled fighter, his goal is to rid the world of the Markers and erase his family's shame. Though he recognizes that Winner only achieves his goal of becoming a vampire hunter, he has not forgotten that he did so only after Karin bit him. At the end of the anime it is shown in a very decisive manner, however, that this 'goal' is born of delusion and general unhappiness with his life and possibly his harsh perceived destiny. Karin bites him, allowing her blood to free Victor from his delusions. In the anime television series, Victor Sinclair is voiced by Katsumi Chō.

== Supporting cast ==
=== Anju Maaka ===
Anju Maaka (真紅 杏樹, Maaka Anju), Karin's younger sister, is a normal vampiress who has yet to reach the onset of her adulthood, and is the only family member who can still travel outside in daytime, when it is cloudy, during dusk, or when she is carrying her parasol to block out the sun. Anju is proficient in the vampiric arts, having a large group of bat familiar spirits who aid in her watch over Karin. Anju, who collects strange dolls, is more frequently seen carrying Boogie-kun (ブギーくん, Bugī-kun), a doll housing the soul of a serial killer. As Karin is unable to erase human memory, Anju's aid is frequently required after Karin has bitten a human. However, Anju knows that when she matures, Karin will be alone when she is outside during the day, so she persuades her parents to allow Kenta to know about Karin without having his memories erased so that he can look after her during the day. In the anime her first victim when she turned into a vampiress is Karin's best friend. Karin, who was shopping for a gift for Anju, saw her when she bit her friend, Maki, and got mad at her but both later got over it. Anju also found out her blood preference is Jealousy. In the manga when she reaches maturity, her first victim is a classmate who has a crush on her. She is initially hurt when Karin tries to force herself to be cheerful about Anju's maturation, but eventually both sisters admit they will miss their times together during the day. In here her blood preference is loneliness. At the end of the series, she cries as Karin's memories are erased and asks Kenta to give Karin enough happiness for them all. She is later seen keeping the family's promise to watch over Karin and her child Kanon. Towards the end of the manga, both Anju and Karin are stunned by Bridget's pregnancy and that they'll both be aunts. After Karin's memories are erased, Anju is seen passing her niece, quietly reminding her that the family will still be there to watch over them. In the anime television series, Anju Maaka is voiced by Yuka Inokuchi in Japanese and Marian Elizabeth Spencer in English.

=== Ren Maaka ===
Ren Maaka (真紅 煉, Maaka Ren), the oldest of the Marker children, has no qualms about sucking blood, and believes vampires to be superior to humans. However, he prefers female victims, seducing female victims and often spending days in their company before he's done with them, and refuses to suck on male blood. Ren often appears annoyed at Karin for her seeming lack of vampiric abilities and her friendliness towards humans. While he will listen to his father Henry, Anju is often the one who will calm him when he's annoyed or subtly prod him into acting in certain ways. He greatly fears Elda Marker, whose overly affectionate manner when he was a child causes him to flee at the mere sight or mention of her. Despite his seeming to always harass Karin, he does love her and wants her to be a normal vampiress along with the family. In the anime television series, Ren Maaka is voiced by Junichi Suwabe in Japanese and Jerry Szombathy in English. Months after Karin's abduction has been resolved he gets a telephone call from Bridget Brownlick, telling him that she is pregnant and that he is the father. This leaves him and his family with great shock, though he has no intentions of being with Bridget. Eventually, it's revealed she had a boy named Rei. Whether due to how Bridget had almost hurt Karin, the shock of being a father, or he doesn't want the responsibility, Ren is very indifferent to the news and wishes not to discuss it. He also erased Karin's memories of her family and being a vampiress so that she could live a normal life as a human after she no longer produced excess blood.

=== Henry Marker ===
Karin Maaka's father, Henry Marker (ヘンリー・マーカー, Henrī Mākā) is a vampire who is portrayed to have a surprisingly human personality; he seems to act in a way one might call "stern." Despite Karin's anomalies and flaws, he loves her dearly. This is exemplified when Karin first suffered a nosebleed at a human school; Henry braved the sunlight to rescue Karin from the hospital workers, who would have realized she was a vampire upon examination, and is severely burned in the process. Henry shows concern when the possibility of love between Karin and Kenta Usui arises. Even though he was from the first generation born in Japan, he and Calera kept the original spelling of their last names, while their children chose to use a Japanese spelling. In the anime television series, Henry Marker is voiced by Dai Matsumoto in Japanese and Paul Pistore in English. In the last volume, Henry's father James reveals that the Edwardses/Markers have an oath to protect the psyche of life because of the death of James' brother Edward. It was also revealed that despite being one of the most mild-mannered vampires, Henry's inherent determination to protect his daughter, the current psyche, made him the most dangerous vampire in Japan. Henry, like his family, was shocked about Bridget's pregnancy and thought that his son would marry her, which Ren quickly told his father to shut up about. His blood preference is "pride".

=== Calera Marker ===
Calera Maaka (カレラ・マーカー, Karera Mākā) is the wife of Henry, having a strong determined personality. However, in important matters she and Henry are equals. When she was first engaged, she was reluctant to marry Henry since she thought she was marrying his father James. However, after James tells her all Henry needs is a strong-willed woman to help him become a better vampire, she takes control and becomes determined to make him into a decent husband. Because her family was the first to increase the vampires numbers in a generation, the other vampire wives envy her and see her as a fertility buddha. Calera loves Karin and worries about the effects of Karin's nature, eventually traveling to her home to see her parents to try to find out the cause and hopeful cure out of fear it will kill her. However, she returns to find her mother Cecilia dead and her father Daniel dying. Calera, out of all the family members, wasn't entirely flabbergasted to hear of Bridget's pregnancy. Her only comment about having a grandchild was "about time." Whenever she feels something stupid has been said or done she usually hits them with whatever she has in her hand, including the random green night slipper. Her blood preference is dishonesty. Calera despises her mother-in-law Elda, who sleeps in a coffin in the Marker family basement. In the anime television series, Calera Maaka is voiced by Emi Shinohara in Japanese and Chio Su Ping in English.

=== Elda Marker ===
Elda Marker (エルダ・マーカー, Eruda Mākā), Henry's mother, sleeps in a coffin in the basement along with her husband, James, whom she greatly loves. When she first awakens in the manga, she runs rampant through Karin's school to extract blood for him so he can wake up, but is saddened to learn upon returning home that he had dried up and was dead. Later in the manga, it has been revealed that Elda had a habit of bullying other vampires which causes them to fear her and her family. All the vampires in Japan has heard of Elda to be the fiercest vampire you shall ever meet. Despite being vampires, Elda and Calera frequently display a struggle between mother and daughter-in-law but the two still do care for each other. Aside from the color and length of their hair and their bust size, Karin and Elda look nearly identical. Elda is fond of her grandchildren, Karin in particular, who she worries will end up hurt upon learning of Karin's feelings for Kenta. It revealed that Elda really despises half-breed vampires because they were the cause to remove them out of Europe. She despises them and would take it to the extreme of killing one. In the anime television series, Elda Maaka is voiced by Yuri Shiratori in Japanese and Denise Tan Shu Fen in English. In the manga, her blood preference was never stated, though she did bite some people and said that she was not attracted to Usui's blood at all. Her husband, James Maaka's blood preference was "young" blood, which Elda collected for him since he harmed humans if he bit them directly. In the anime, her preference was "love."

=== Fumio Usui ===
Fumio Usui (雨水 文緒, Usui Fumio), Kenta's mother, is generally depressed and has trouble keeping jobs, usually being fired after one of her male co-workers sexually harasses her. It was speculated by Anju that she has overactive pheromones, which is the reason why men are drawn to her. In the first volume, Karin bites Fumio, injecting her blood and leaving Fumio cheery, energetic, and with a great increase in self-confidence. It is later speculated that Karin's blood makes people who they want to be. The sudden change in his mother's behavior, coupled with the strange marks on her neck, make Kenta suspicious about what Karin did to her that night. Fumio is a young mother, having gotten pregnant at the age of sixteen by her high school boyfriend, Shusei Iizuka. Her mother was furious at this, ordering Fumio to get an abortion, but Fumio refuses. During her pregnancy, she is abused by her mother, verbally and physically, and after his birth, her mother ignores Kenta, only speaking to him long enough to yell about him being a disgrace. To protect him from getting hurt any further, Fumio took Kenta and fled to Shiihaba to start a new life. However, when her mother was sick, Fumio returned to take care of her. In the anime, she finally finds a job that works for her and becomes very happy. In the anime television series, Fumio Usui is voiced by Aya Hisakawa.

=== Maki Tokitou ===
Maki Tokitou (時任 麻希, Tokitō Maki) has been Karin's best friend and classmate since childhood. When they were young, Maki helped Karin, who was stuck in a drainage ditch, and it was Maki's mother who taught Karin how to cook so well. Karin and Maki remained best friends through high school. She watches Karin and Usui's relationship progress and encourages them when she can. In the anime adaptation, Maki falls in love with Winner Sinclair but is jealous because he pays more attention to Karin, and she later found out from Winner that Karin is a vampire. In the anime television series, Maki Tokitou is voiced by Mikako Takahashi. In the last chapter of vol. 14, 'Airmail', Maki tries to set up Yuuji Kikuchi, whom she has known since childhood, with Fumio Usui. That doesn't work, so he suggests going out with her. They have a fractious dating life, which continues into marriage. She also becomes a physical education instructor at Shiihaba Middle School, where Kanon goes. In the final short story, set in 2009, she comes over to Karin's house to celebrate Karin's birthday.

=== Shusei Iizuka ===
Shusei Iizuka (飯塚 修成, Iizuka Shusei) is Kenta Usui's father. He and Fumio conceived Kenta while still in high school, upsetting Fumio's mother. He was barred from contact with Kenta. He and Kenta look very much alike, with the exception of a scar above Shusei's left ear, shown in an omake to have been given to him by Fumio at a young age when she pushed him into a jungle gym. He locates Fumio and Kenta by following a detective charged to find Fumio by her mother, wanting to apologize for the past. He notes that he is dating a woman who is now pregnant, and he does not intend to repeat the mistakes he made with Fumio.

=== Winner Sinclair ===
Anime-exclusive character

Winner Sinclair (ウィナー・シンクレア, Winā Shinkurea) is a character seen only in the anime adaptation. The descendant of Alfred Sinclair, he is a vampire hunter who gained the confidence to follow in his grandfather's steps after he was bitten by Karin when he was a child. Winner is first shown in the beginning of the first episode at the dock where he is seen bitten by Karin. He is generally happy and full of confidence, however he frequently makes a fool of himself and is considered inept by even the vampires he attempts to hunt. He means well and is not afraid to put himself at risk for others. He has dark blonde hair and blue eyes, and is afraid of blood. Winner isn't very smart; not only does he refuse to accept Karin is creeped out by him, he sees as a prize to fight Kenta over. He is first member of the Sinclair clan since Alfred to break free from the mutually destructive vendetta against the Marker clan. In the anime television series, Winner Sinclair is voiced by Kōki Miyata. In the English dub, he is voiced by James Shubert.

=== Alfred Sinclair ===
Anime-exclusive character

Alfred Sinclair (アルフレッド・シンクレア, Arufureddo Shinkurea) is a character created for the anime adaptation. He is the ancestor of Winner and Victor Sinclair. The Sinclair's family history has written him down as the man who was in love with a vampire, Elda Marker. He was both a poet and a writer who wanted a world where humans and vampires could co-exist without fighting. Alfred's father both disapproved of and feared Alfred's vampire lover Elda, forbidding him to see her. After having locked away his son to stop the relationship and lied to Elda, saying Alfred had asked him to break up with her for him, Elda was driven to a mad feeding frenzy by her rage and feelings of abandonment. This led Alfred's father to take advantage of the situation and make a bid to rid the world of her presence. During the raid on her hiding place, however, Alfred managed to free himself and find her before the others got to her. In a stroke of misfortune, Elda's den was set alight, leaving the two inside to be burnt alive. To save his love, Alfred offered her his blood as she could gain strength to escape the fire, promising he would never forget he loved her. Things did not go as he thought it would and once Elda bit him, his love was gone so all that was left was hatred for her and all vampires. In a trance, he stabbed her in the chest, leaving a scar between her breasts. Briefly after Elda had fled, cursing all humans, he snapped out of this trance-like state and to his horror realized what he had done, it is unknown if he died while being burned alive or died from natural cause. In the anime television series, Alfred Sinclair is voiced by Tomokazu Sugita.

== Other characters ==
=== Harumi ===
Harumi' (晴美, Harumi) is a girl seen in early chapters of the manga. When Karin attempted to bite her, she was interrupted by Kenta and in return stole Karin's bag. She was discovered to be selling herself at the local Love Hotel by Fumio Usui in order to pay for living there after she ran away from her family. Eventually, Fumio forces the police to shut down the Love Hotel after posing as a student claiming to be forced into working at the hotel against her will and Harumi was persuaded by Fumio to return to her family.

=== Kanon Usui ===
Daughter of Karin and Kenta Usui, and the reincarnation of Sophia Pistis. She shares her love for Kenta in a comedic manner which makes Karin somewhat uncomfortable. She seem to have inherited her great-grandmother Elda's playful behavior.

=== Sophia Pistis ===
Sophia Pistis (ソフィア・ピスティス, Sofia Pisutisu) was a woman who was born inside a vampiress and was the psyche known as "the fountain of life". For thousands of years she was reborn within the body of a vampiress of the Armash bloodline and forced to have a child to continue that bloodline. Once the next member of her bloodline was born she would be drained of her blood to help the other vampires reproduce. Unfortunately as the vampiress she was reborn in could not drain the blood of another, they had a limited lifespan and would eventually die, becoming part of Sophia's life essence in the process and forcing her to be reborn in the body of another member of the bloodline. In the past, Edward Edwards (エドワード・エドウズ, Edowādo Edōzu), a granduncle of James, died breaking a reincarnation of hers out of the vampires' prison, which marked the Edwardses a clan of traitors.

The kiss between Karin and Kenta, reconciling humans and vampires, broke the curse, or obligation, to be reborn. She was passed over to Kenta when Kenta and Karin kissed and was able to lead Kenta to where the Brownlicks had taken her to because of it. According to James Marker, the vampires had relied on her for the sake of their own survival for centuries, however, after centuries their efforts had become vain. After Karin's rescue, she declared because she was now inside of Kenta she was now free of her curse, but admitted after centuries had forgotten how to return to her grave. Despite this, she is content, as she is with Kenta, who she loves. Eventually she was reborn as Karin and Kenta's daughter, Kanon Usui, who shares her love for Kenta in a comedic manner which makes Karin somewhat uncomfortable.

The name "Pistis Sophia" would later appear as the original name of a character in another one of Kagesaki's manga, Hekikai no Aion. It was revealed on a special that she is the younger sister of the Akuma twins, with one of them (Shizuki) sharing the same name for reasons unknown. They refer to Karin's Sophia as Psyche when they briefly met inside Karin a few months before her rebirth as Kanon.

=== James Marker ===
James Marker (ジェイムス・マーカー, Jeimusu Mākā) was Elda Marker's husband and Karin's grandfather, he came to Japan under the name of "James Edwards" but had adopted Elda's family name upon marrying her to hide the Edwards family name. When Elda awakened in the storyline, she discovered he had died in his sleep, apparently due to his reluctance during his lifetime to drink the blood of humans. He came to Japan to escape the church's Vampire hunt and had ensured Elda Marker's well-being after her family was apparently lost. When he met Cecila he attempted to marry her but she was already in love with Daniel, in the end he settled for an agreement that Cecila's daughter would marry his son. In truth he wanted to safeguard the Armash bloodline. His motivations were discovered after Calera visited her dying father. His spirit/ghost lingered around the home, was spotted by Anju and put into a stuffed teddy bear. Anju knew that ghosts disturbed Karin. Somehow Anju discovered that this was James' ghost and she and Calera questioned him about all the issues raised by Karin's abduction. Anju later gave the stuffed teddy bear to Elda to keep her company at night.

=== Cecila Armash ===
Cecila Armash (セシリア・アルマーシュ, Seshiria Arumāshu) was Calera's mother and Karin's grandmother. Because other vampires considered the Armash family disreputable Cecila and Calera had no contact after Calera's marriage to Henry Marker. She had already passed on by the time her daughter Calera returned to visit.

Having been sheltered most of her life, Cecelia was something of a well-meaning airhead.

=== Daniel Armash ===
Daniel Armash (ダニエル・アルマーシュ, Danieru Arumāshu) is Calera's father and Cecila's husband who adopted her family name to preserve the curse. When his wife Cecila died he lost the will to live and decided to allow himself to wither away and die with her. By the time Calera found him he was already too far gone and she stayed with him to the end.

=== Sister Rosary ===
As well as the main series, chapter 58, the final chapter of Vol.14, reveals the fate of the church which had hunted the vampires in Europe causing them to flee to Japan. The chapter revolves around Sister Rosary (シスター・ロザリー, Shisutā Rozarī), the last remaining member of the church and two descendants of the remaining members of Elda Marker's family left behind in Europe, Frederick and his aunt.

Sister Rosary is the nun seen in the last chapter of the manga. She is the last member of the church that hunted the vampires. For three years before the events of the chapter, Frederick Marker had been visiting the church and both had shared a common fondness for Japanese manga. Rosary was the last remaining sister of the church having been adopted as a baby by the previous sole surviving sister of the church sister Alyssa. After Frederick's aunt Elga tries to end the legacy of the church, she comes to understand that despite what Alyssa had taught her, not only were vampires not as extinct as the church had thought, but there were both good and bad vampires as well. Despite the events between Frederick and his aunt, Frederick continues to visit Sister Rosary after his aunt gives him permission to do as he pleases.

=== Frederick Marker ===
Frederick Marker (フリードリヒ・マーカー, Furīdorihi Mākā) was revealed in the last chapter of the manga as a descendant of one of the surviving vampires left behind when the other Vampires fled to Japan. He is a distant blood relative to Karin (second cousins) and her family (grandson of Elda's brother, hence her grandnephew). He originally greets Sister Rosary three years before the storyline posing as a university student and had attended confession to confess he was an otaku, to which Sister Rosary revealed she too was fond of Japanese manga. However, when Frederick's maternal aunt Elga tries to kill her, Frederick protects Sister Rosary due to his fondness of her and a feeling of responsibility and reveals it was he who was the one who had found her as a baby in the freezing snow and took her to the church in the first place. He bears a slight resemblance to Ren Maaka.

=== Elga Marker ===
Elga Marker (エルガ・マーカー, Eruga Mākā), Frederick's aunt, is a surviving member of the Marker family in Europe revealed in the last chapter of the manga and is Elda's niece (daughter of the latter's brother). She sent her nephew Frederick to investigate Sister Rosary after she inherited the legacy of the vampire hunting church from Sister Alyssa. However, after Frederick refuses to kill the last member of the church, she attempts to take Sister Rosary's life herself only to find her nephew Frederick had decided to protect Sister Rosary. After he reveals he is responsible for Rosary entering the church in the first place, she leaves him to do as he pleases. She bears many physical similarities to Elda, Karin, and Kanon.
