= Aion (manga) =

Japanese manga series

- Cover of the first volume of Aion featuring Seine Miyazaki

碧海のAiON
- Manga
- Written by: Yuna Kagesaki
- Published by: Fujimi Shobo
- English publisher: NA: Viz Media
- Magazine: Monthly Dragon Age
- Original run: August 10, 2008 – October 5, 2012
- Volumes: 11

Aion (碧海のAiON, Hekikai no Aiōn; literally meaning "Aion of Green Sea") is a Japanese manga series written and illustrated by Yuna Kagesaki. The series was published in Japan by Fujimi Shobo and serialized in Monthly Dragon Age magazine. The manga has been distributed in English by Tokyopop. The story is about an immortal girl, Seine Miyazaki, and an orphan boy, Tatsuya Tsugawa, who gets involved with her.

== Plot ==
After both his parents died in an accident, Tsugawa Tatsuya is now left with millions in inheritance that he cannot use. In the weeks after, he is still mourning and thinking about his father's last words, "A Tsugawa family's man must be a man of great caliber". However, Tatsuya is not confident he can fulfill his father's last wish.

One day a week after the accident, he meets Seine Miyazaki, a strange girl who seems to enjoy being bullied. Tatsuya believes he can help her although his friends only see her as a masochist pervert, and Seine herself told him to mind his own business.

Seine hunts creatures of the sea, a kind of parasitic bug that controls humans and influences them to do hateful things. She possesses an immortal body and a beast called AiON that is used to lure and devour the bugs from inside the human host. She and the bugs naturally have an impulse to kill each other on contact.

Even so, Tatsuya still cannot just leave her alone. He wants to help her.

== Characters ==
=== Main characters ===
Seine Miyazaki (宮崎星音, Miyazaki Seine)
Voiced by: Haruka Tomatsu (Drama CD)
Miyazaki Seine is a 300-year-old girl with an immortal body who Tatsuya invites to live in his home; before that she lived in a cardboard box in a park. In the first episode, Seine looks like a masochist because she seems to like being bullied. Actually, she becomes close to people who are infected by "mushis", a kind of parasitic, mind-controlling bugs, in order to hunt them. Her hunting ways go against the kind and pacifist Tatsuya's beliefs. Her motive is to avenge her foster father Shimon's death by killing the people of sea, the mermaids. She controls a black snake called Aion that lives inside her. Her weakness is her inability to swim. Tatsuya at first calls her "Miyazaki-san." She tells Tatsuya to call her "Seine" since "Miyazaki" is just made up; "Seine" merely sounds most like her real name. She claims to only love Shimon, but she is slowly warming up to Tatsuya.

Tatsuya Tsugawa (津川達哉, Tsuwaga Tatsuya)
Voiced by: Mamiko Noto (Drama CD)
After the death of his parents in a car accident, Tatsuya tries to live to fulfill his father's last wish of becoming a "high caliber" man. After "saving" Seine from bullying, he insisted on trying to help her even after finding out the real goal of Seine. He is kind, optimistic and believes in other people's good side which is sometimes an obstacle in Seine's revenge. He is a bad cook, but Seine somehow is not bothered by his food. He has a crush on Seine and wants to be acknowledged as a "high caliber" man by her.

Nagisa Yoshiyuki
Nagisa is a girl in Tatsuya's class, a long time acquaintance, and would probably like to get closer to Tatsuya, but Nagisa has had violent allergic reactions whenever she is in Tatsuya's house ever since Tatsuya found a lost puppy (soon to be Crokette). She stays away from the house and the dog, effectively putting some distance between him and her, even though she loves him. She is the fourth person shown in the story to be infected by a "mushi".

Minato-kun
Minato-kun is a boy in Tatsuya's school, friend to both Tatsuya and Nagisa. Nagisa asks him to keep her allergy to dogs confidential.

Shizuki (Pistis Sophia)
Shizuki is the older sister of the "Akuma Twins". Being the older, she is sarcastic, lazy, and smart, but she has a weak body; she can get sick and tired easily, cannot swim in pools as a result of the chlorine, and almost was killed by Tatsuya's food. She has an immortal body and has lived for centuries. She gave immortal bodies to Seine and Shimon. Her former name was "Pistis Sophia" but she changed because it was "stupid". She is a Oyaji-con (she is attracted to "handsome" grown up men). The name Pistis Sophia is a character from an earlier work of Yuna Kagesaki's: Chibi Vampire, who is actually their younger sister Psyche. Shizuki and her sister call Seine "Sehne".

Yuzuki
Yuzuki is Shizuki's younger sister. She is the opposite side of her sister: her body has superhuman strength, she is diligent and a good cooker but is a little dumb. She is good-hearted and satisfies her Onee-sama's orders. She also has an immortal body and has lived for centuries. She is a Lolicon (she get excited by children, especially girls) to the point to kissing every children on their mouth upon seeing them.

Shimon
Shimon was Seine's third foster father and the one person who showed her kindness when she was young. He was known as a magician in his time and was also known to be 1700 years old (about 300 years ago in present time of the story). He bore the "Aion" mark, just like Seine does at the present time, but he had it across the right shoulder and was able to use Aion's power for his own, unknown, reasons. Seine is bent on revenge after the mermaid ate Shimon, but after Ariel said that they would "return" Shimon to Seine she just spit onto Seine's forehead, causing her to go into a coma-like sleep.

Minagi
Tatsuya's first cousin, once-removed, an elementary school aged girl. Her parents were the second and third ones shown in the story to be infected by a "mushi".

Tsukasa
Tsugawa family lawyer, responsible for managing Tatsuya's money until he gets old enough. Tatsuya calls him his "brother", which he explains as foster-brother since Tsukasa was in the house so much in earlier years. When he was first seen, he had been knocked unconscious by the Akuma twins and took a long time to regain consciousness.

=== Creatures of Sea ===
"Mushis"
"Mushi" is the name of any kind of mind controlling bug. They infect humans by touch or bite. An infected human has a normal life until they see Seine's face, then they develop an irrepressible rage toward her and a desire to kill her. Seine usually refrains from destroying the mushi before the infected human kills her once, otherwise the desire to kill her remains even after the mushi is removed.

Mermaids
They are Seine's prey. They are 7 in all. As of the start of the story, Seine believes she has killed one of them. Up to chapter 32, five of them have been introduced and named.

Sheila
The youngest of the mermaids; she is despised by all her older sisters except for Ariel. Seine thought she had killed her some 300 years before, but Ariel restored her body almost entirely, leaving her badly scarred about the neck and unable to talk, but with the ability to change herself to have legs and walk about on land. She was introduced as a new transfer student; and Tatsuya is given the assignment of teaching her sign language. Her true goal is infect a lot of people to order to take revenge on Seine for leaving her without her voice. She falls in love with Tatsuya.

Anoshu
The fourth of the mermaids. A bit of a dimwit, and not entirely a bad sort.

Enati
The third of the mermaids. Possesses Simon's skull, and supposedly all his knowledge.

Bella
The second of the mermaids. She is sadistic, heartless and cruel. She is respected (feared) by her younger sisters, with Sheila fearing her the most. The only one she fears is her older sister Ariel.

Ariel
The first mermaid and the eldest of them all. Ariel is also biggest of them and the most powerful. Only being overcoming for her "Father". She is the only one who is nice to Sheila and gave her a new body to replace the one that she had lost. She admits to loving Sheila more than she loves her other sisters.

== Manga ==
On July 2, 2010, Tokyopop announced it had acquired a title license for Aion's release in North America at Anime Expo with a first volume release set at January 8, 2011. Tokyopop released three volumes total before closing its North American publishing division in April 2011. After Tokyopop lost the rights, Viz Media re-published the series digitally under their Viz Selects line.

== Reception ==
Reviews on the manga were mixed, overall Anime News Network gave the first two volumes a C rating while ANN praised the story's "fantastical mix-and-match of ideas" and "Lively conversation and psychological gamesmanship in the later chapters" however, it was also seen to have plain artwork and too many subplots. The second volume also was said to focus too much on secondary characters with no plot advancement. Newsarama called the artwork of the series so far "definitely appealing" and states it has great deal of potential with occasionally quite creative angles. Newsarama also goes on to say that the relationship is left unexplained between the two main characters and although the questions being put forward are intriguing they are not really suspenseful and that sort of slow build between the two main characters can sometimes make it difficult to judge a series solely by its first volume. The Manga Critic did a short take on the first volume calling it "maudlin, nonsensical, and boring" with bad artwork the bottom line being that the story is both predictable and emotionally flat, making it a tough sell for all but the most ardent Chibi Vampire fans.

Sequential Tart gave the first two volumes both a grade of 7, saying that the first book was a solid set up for the series and has a lot of possibilities on where it can go, the review goes on to say that the plot has a serious flaw in having Tatsuya's parents and aunt and uncle out of the picture fast to get him and Seine living together in the same house. The second volume had more mixed feelings with the focus on Seine and learning more about her background and relationships being good but the fan service at the start of the volume being questioned.
