= Yuka Inokuchi =

Japanese voice actress (born 1978)

- 猪口 有佳
- Born: June 5, 1978 (age 47); Kurume, Fukuoka Prefecture, Japan
- Other names: Yuka Inokuchi (いのくちゆか); Ayaka Kimura (木村あやか); Shingetsu Hatsukaze (新月初風); Ara Jinba (神葉愛良); Akari Muraki (むらきあかり); Mirai Yamada (山田ミライ); Chiyoko Satō (佐藤ちよこ); Mirika Sawano (沢野みりか); Kana Shida (志田かな); Suzuharataruto (鈴原たると); Shiori Ino (飯野汐里)
- Occupation: Voice actress
- Years active: 1999–present
- Agent: Ken Production
- Height: 153 cm (5 ft 0 in)

Yuka Inokuchi (猪口 有佳, Inokuchi Yuka; born June 5, 1978) is a Japanese voice actress who is affiliated with Ken Production. She is originally from Kurume, Fukuoka Prefecture. She voices Uzume in Ai Yori Aoshi, Rin Kamishiro in Maburaho, Anju Maaka in Karin, Tabitha in The Familiar of Zero, Nao Yorihime in Yosuga no Sora, and Ai in Dragon Crisis!. She also goes by Ayaka Kimura (木村 あやか, Kimura Ayaka) and is known for her extensive work in visual novels and adult original animation videos. Other roles include Momiji in Maple Colors, Aoi Niiyama in Akiiro Renka, Chisa in Gift, Kana Suoin in Otome wa Boku ni Koishiteru, Mikan in Wanko to Kuraso, Yui Kuroda in Hoshiuta.

== Filmography ==
=== Anime ===
List of voice performances in anime
Year	Title	Role	Notes	Source
2002	The Twelve Kingdoms	Secretary 2		
2002–03	Ai Yori Aoshi series	Uzume		
2002	Atashinchi	Yuzuhiko Tachibana (0 years old)		
2002	Shrine of the Morning Mist	Girl C		
2002	Petite Princess Yucie	Girl		
2002	GetBackers	High school girl		
2003	Gunparade March	Miho, Mieko		
2003	Maburaho	Rin Kamishiro		
2003	R.O.D the TV	Airport staff		
2004	Doki Doki School Hours	Schoolgirl		
2004	Tsuki wa Higashi ni Hi wa Nishi ni - Operation Sanctuary	Yui Nonohara		
2004–05	Girls Bravo series	Hinata		
2004	Petopeto-san	Chochomaru Sahara		
2004	Kakyuusei 2	Yuri Shirai		
2004	Uta Kata	Tomoko		
2004	Maple Colors	Momiji Aio	OVA Adult, As Ayaka Kimura	
2005	Negima! series	Zazie Rainyday		
2005	Mahoraba	Sakura Utsugi		
2005	Kaiketsu Zorori	Girl		
2005	MÄR	Schoolgirl		
2005	Best Student Council	Kenran Seitokai Secretary		
2005	Night Shift Nurses: Experiment	Yuu Yagami	OVA Adult	
2005	Canvas 2: Niji Iro no Sketch	Saya Saginomiya		
2005	Cluster Edge	Children		
2005	Kotencotenco	Putchi		
2005	Karin	Anju Maaka		
2006	Ray	Hana		
2006–12	The Familiar of Zero series	Tabitha		
2006	Night Head Genesis	Ayane		
2006	Negima!?	Zazie Rainyday		
2006	Buso Renkin	Chisato Wakamiya		
2006	Mamoru-kun ni Megami no Shukufuku o!	Anna Hase		
2006	Hell Girl: Two Mirrors	Mari Fujimaki		
2007	Kaze no Stigma	Yukari Shinomiya		
2007	Blue Drop	Noval Operator 2		
2007	Rental Magica	Ghost girl		
2007	Double Duty Nurses	Hitomi Naruse	OVA Adult	
2008–10	Koihime Musō series	Tōtaku (Dong Zhuo), Yue		
2008	Yozakura Quartet	Kana Tatebayashi	Also Hana no Uta in 2013	
2010	Stitch!: Zutto Saikō no Tomodachi	Girl		
2010	Yosuga no Sora	Nao Yorihime		
2011	Dragon Crisis!	Ai		
2012	Love, Election and Chocolate	Ai Sarue		
2013	Muromi-san	Homan-san		
2014–15	PriPara series	Ran Tan		

=== Film ===
List of voice performances in film
Year	Title	Role	Notes	Source
2010	Crayon Shin-chan: Super-Dimension! The Storm Called My Bride	Children		
2011	Negima! Anime Final	Zazie Rainyday		

=== Video games ===
List of voice performances in video games
Year	Title	Role	Notes	Source
2002	Unlimited Saga	Judy, Michel	PS1/PS2	
2003	One: Kagayaku Kisetsu e	Nagamori MizuhoKei 長森瑞佳	PC Adult	
2003	Ai Yori Aoshi	Uzume	PS1/PS2	
2003	After...	Rū	PC Adult	
2003–05	Maple Colors games	Momiji Akiho	PC Adult	
2003	Tsuki wa Higashi ni Hi wa Nishi ni: Operation Sanctuary	Yui Nonohara		
2004–05	Night Shift Nurses: Sun	Yu Yagami	PC Adult, related videos	
2005	Otome wa Boku ni Koishiteru	Kana Suōin	PC Adult	
2005	Akiiro Renka	Aoi Shinyama	PC Adult	
2005	Tears to Tiara	Rimurisu リムリス	PC Adult	
2006–15	Tsuyokiss	Sunao Konoe	Also as Mirai Yamada	
2005–06	Gift games	Chisa Fujimiya	PC Adult, As Ayaka Kimura	
2005–06	Negima! games	Zazie Rainyday	PS1/PS2	
2006	Canvas 2	Saya Saginomiya	PS1/PS2	
2006	Maho Tama Series	Mei	PC Adult, As Ayaka Kimura	
2006	Wanko to Kurasō	Mikan	PC Adult	
2006	Crayon Shin-chan strongest family Kasukabe King Wie - クレヨンしんちゃん 最強家族カスカベキング うぃ～	Saki サキ	Wii	
2007–10	Koihime Musou	Totaku (Dong Zhuo)	PC Adult; Mana: Month	
2007–08	The Familiar of Zero games	Tabitha	PS1/PS2	
2007	Buso Renkin games	Chisato Wakamiya 若宮千里	PS1/PS2	
2007–10	Time Leap	Yu Hayama	As Suzuharataruto	
2008	Princess Lover!	Yu Fujikura 藤倉優	PC Adult, Also as Ayaka Kimura, also sequel in 2010	
2008	Haruiro Ouse	Haruna Okazaki 岡崎春奈	PC Adult; Sawano Milica name	
2008	Yosuga no Sora	Nao Yorihime	PC Adult, As Ayaka Kimura	
2008	Hoshiuta	Yui Kuroda	PC Adult, As Ayaka Kimura	
2010	Love, Election and Chocolate	Ai Saure	PC Adult, As Chiyoko Sato, also portable in 2012	
2010	Axanael	Noko	PC Adult, As Ayaka Kimura	
2011	Kajiri Kamui Kagura	Tenma Numahime	PC Adult, As Ayaka Kimura, also Hikari in 2013	
2012	Maji de Watashi ni Koi Shinasai! S	Sayaka Mayuzumi 黛 紗也佳	PC Adult; As Ayaka Kimura	
2012	Generation of Chaos 6	Sasha	PSP	
2014	Granblue Fantasy	Anna, Tsukuyomi	Mobile / Browser / PC	

=== Drama CDs ===
List of voice performances in audio recordings
Title	Role	Notes	Source
Kira Kira Melody Gakuen (Kirakira☆メロディ学園)	Setsuko Yashiro		
Growlanser 3	Elena		
Nurse Witch Komugi			
Hybrid x Heart Magias Academy Ataraxia	Aine Chidorigafuchi	As Ayaka Kimura	
