= Maple Colors =

2003 video game

- Cover art of the DVD-ROM release.

メイプルカラーズ (Meipuru Karāzu)
- Genre: Erotica, Harem
- Video game
- Developer: Apricot
- Publisher: CrossNet
- Genre: Adventure, Visual novel
- Platform: Microsoft Windows
- Released: July 25, 2003
- Video game

Maple Colors: Kessen ha Gakuen Matsuri!
- Developer: HuneX
- Publisher: Kadokawa Shoten
- Genre: Adventure, Visual novel
- Platform: PlayStation 2
- Released: March 31, 2005
- Original video animation
- Directed by: Ryou Kanda
- Produced by: Taketo Watari
- Written by: Yasuyuki Muntou
- Music by: Fujimoto
- Studio: Image House; Studio Soul
- Licensed by: AUS: Siren Visual; NA: Critical Mass
- Released: December 24, 2004 – March 25, 2005
- Runtime: 30 minutes each
- Episodes: 2

Maple Colors (メイプルカラーズ, Meipuru Karāzu) is a Japanese erotic visual novel and adventure game developed by Apricot and published by CrossNet, released on July 25, 2003 for Windows. The game was later ported to the PlayStation 2 by HuneX and published by Kadokawa Shoten on March 31, 2005; adapted into a two-episode animated series by Image House and localized in North America by Critical Mass, and in Australia by Siren Visual. A sequel, Maple Colors 2, was released in 2008.

== Gameplay ==
Unlike the formula of most visual novels, which are noted for their minimal interaction, Maple Colors is slightly different in that it combines elements of an adventure game with that of interactive fiction. Though reasonably limited, players control chibi versions of characters, able to travel around isometric maps, perform tasks, collect items and even participate in mini-games. In a more recognizable fashion, players watch and listen to sequences of story and then select choosable actions or responses when they are presented. As choices are intricately linked to alternating routes of plot, the direction of the story is changed, leading to erotic scenes between characters and ultimately one of various endings. In order for the player to watch all the possible endings in this regard, he or she will have to effectively replay through the game several times, all the while making different selections.

== Plot ==
Yoshijirou Saku is a young Japanese transfer student of the fictional Kouka Academy, an institution renowned for its theatre. A rebel by virtue of his delinquency, Saku and schoolmate Mirai Aoi are wrongfully held responsible for a fight when they come to the aggressive aid of a defenseless student being bullied; faculty members ruling to expel them and their disorderly class. Yukihito Aizen, the respected though contemptible head of the drama club, with eyes set on Mirai, proposes a commutation requiring the offenders to enlist their entire class in a play or else face expulsion.

== Characters ==
Yoshijirou Saku (佐久 良次郎, Saku Yoshijirō)

Yoshijirou Saku is the unlikely protagonist of the series. A recent second-year transfer student, his life takes an unexpected turn when he is blamed for fighting and threatened with expulsion, along with classmate Mirai Aoi. Given the chance to redress his actions, Yoshijirou is assigned to recruit his entire class, a notorious group of disobedient misfits, to perform in a play lest having to leave school permanently with them.

Mirai Aoi (葵 未来, Aoi Mirai)

Loud and headstrong, Mirai Aoi is a second-year student and the most iconic character of the series. Known among her class by the nickname "Captain", Mirai is a temperamental, fastidious leader, determined to combat the ridicule and undermining she and her group regularly receive from the rest of the school. An accomplice by association, Mirai is required to assist Yoshijirou in appropriating their class for the play; a task she grows to respect and admire him for.

Momiji Aio (秋穂 もみじ, Aio Momiji)

Momiji Aio is a second-year student, recognizable by her long pink hair and flamboyant wardrobe; aspiring to be a playwright and director. A short, friendly girl, Momiji is meek and easily intimidated by nature; on stage, a serious and capable actress. She is good friends with Mirai.

Sora Suzuhara (鈴原 空, Suzuhara Sora)

Distant and reserved, Sora Suzuhara is a second-year student who is also on the swim team. With a preference for solitude and disinterest in others, Sora is antisocial, nihilistic, mysterious, and deadpan. Through her acquaintance with Yoshijirou however, Sora becomes emotional, open and appreciative.

Amu Uzuki (卯月 あむ, Uzuki Amu)

Amu Uzuki is an adolescent entertainer, actress and celebrity, widely known and recognized across Japan for her acting, affluence, and looks. She visits Kouka Academy in response to the play being arranged and offers to participate in it; taking a fondness for Yoshijirou. In spite of the fame and fortune she commands, her classist family, constant traveling, few friends and nonexistent love life take a toll on her.

Motoko Sakimori (咲守 素子, Sakimori Motoko)

Direct and quiet, Motoko Sakimori is a second-year student who doubles as the local Shinto shrine miko. She is recognized for donning her robes in place of a school uniform, serious, tough-love attitude, nage-waza martial arts and purple hair. In a fashion similar to Sora, Motoko opens up around Yoshijirou, showing a less seen, tender side of her; one including an affection for anything cute.

Youko Momoi (桃井 葉子, Momoi Yōko)

Youko Momoi is a second-year student who is on the girls' softball team as an ace pitcher. A friendly though clumsy girl, Youko is easily intimidated, buckles under pressure and struggles with theatre. Of all the characters that appear in the game, Youko is the only one bespectacled female.

== Casts ==
- Yoshijirou Saku - Hikaru Midorikawa
- Mirai Aoi - Hitomi
- Momiji Aio - Ayaka Kimura
- Sora Suzuhara - Akane Tomonaga
- Amu Uzuki - Momoka Usami
- Motoko Sakimori - Ruru
- Youko Momoi - Ooonami
- Mirin Kazuki - Kasumi Touno
- Yumi Sakanakura - Seiko Ikuina
- Makoto Sakura - Kohiro Fukumoto
- Maki Sanebara - Sayuki Haruno
- Hijiri Takano - Kyouko Hirano
- Kanata Tanaka - Haruka Nagami
- Yato Chikumagawa - Ai Kawano
- Chika Natsume - Miya Serizono
- Yoriko Niyou - Pochi Uchino
- Minori Baba - Rin Miyabi
- Konoha Hayashi - Yuki Kajita
- Momo Momochi - Asuka Misono
- Akira Yamagata - Ren Kashiwakura
- Chikara Ohkubo - Yūsuke Kazami
- Atsushi Onikojima - Kenji Nojima
- Nayuta Kuon - Yukimatsu Yoshi
- Kojirou Koishi - Kazunari Tanaka
- Kochi Shinonome - Shin Shōin
- Kimonobu Hattori - Kazunari Tanaka
- Itaru Hebime - Michael Shitanda
- Junichi Migata - Mari Oda
- Kouzukenosuke Mimasaka - Hiroshi Sato
- Getarou Memekura - Ai Kawano
- Tarou Yamada - Tomokazu Sugita
- Kanako Sakamoto - Mari Oda
- Shinobu Watarai - Rin Miyabi
- Tetsuko Iwata - Asuka Misono
- Yumeko Jinguuji - Shiho Kawaragi
- Yukihito Aizen - Tomokazu Sugita
- Hiiko Osugi - Hiroshi Sato
- Chibi - Kenji Nojima
- Debu - Michael Shitanda

== Development ==
Maple Colors was officially announced via its website going live on January 15, 2003; character profiles released same day. On January 29, CrossNet reported that it would be releasing a public, downloadable benchmark of the game on February 1; this was postponed until February 3 the day after. Despite this, the trial was actually released on February 4; select participants were additionally awarded game merchandise.

After updating the game website with additional screenshots, CrossNet announced that Maple Colors would be released on July 18 on May 22. The site was revamped on May 30, followed by more screenshots, a sample of the opening video and theme "Breakthrough Your Heart" by Yuria, and then additional screenshots from June 6 to 9. On June 11, after announcing the voice actors working on the project, CrossNet stated that Maple Colors had been postponed until July 25. The day after, CrossNet announced that it was hosting a public venue to showcase the game in Akihabara from June 13 to 14. This was followed by subsequent updates to the game site from June 18 to July 1.

Two days later, on July 3, CrossNet scheduled another venue for July 11 and 12 in Akihabara and Osaka. With the release date readily approaching, CrossNet announced on July 7 that it would be hosting a celebratory event; confirming that the July 25 date was unchanged. As final commercial endeavors, the complete soundtrack of the game was released on September 26 by Lantis; a radio drama following on October 22.

=== Patches ===
On July 24, 2003, the day before Maple Colors was released, a series of debilitating bugs were discovered. That same day, CrossNet announced that it was developing a patch to address the issues in time for the release. The following day the patch went live, downloadable from the official game website, bringing the game up to version 1.11. Despite the effort, two more patches were developed to supplement the previous patches as well as address newly discovered bugs, bringing the game up to a stable version of 1.11β.

== Reception ==
Maple Colors was met with mixed reception, ranking 28 out of 50 on Getchu.com for the year of its release. Maple Colors H, a gaiden released on January 30, 2004, fared better, ranking 4 out of 20 for the month of its release, 16 for the month of February, and 40 out of 50 for the overall year. Maple Colors: Kessen ha Gakuen Matsuri!, according to the July 2004 issue of Famitsu.
