= Yosuga no Sora =

Japanese visual novel and its franchise

- Yosuga no Sora original visual novel cover featuring Akira Amatsume (top) and Sora Kasugano (bottom)

ヨスガノソラ
- Genre: Romance, Drama
- Video game
- Developer: Sphere
- Publisher: Sphere
- Genre: ADV, Visual novel
- Platform: Windows
- Released: December 5, 2008
- Manga
- Written by: Takashi Mikaze
- Published by: Kadokawa Shoten
- Magazine: Comp Ace
- Original run: August 26, 2009 – November 26, 2010
- Volumes: 2
- Anime television series
- Directed by: Takeo Takahashi
- Produced by: Tomoko Kawasaki; Takahiro Yamanaka
- Written by: Naruhisa Arakawa
- Music by: Manabu Miwa; Jun Ichikawa (Note: Credited under the pseudonym Bruno Wen-li.)
- Studio: Feel
- Licensed by: NA: Media Blasters
- Original network: AT-X, Tokyo MX, BS11
- English network: US: Toku
- Original run: October 4, 2010 – December 20, 2010
- Episodes: 12
- icon

Yosuga no Sora (Japanese: ヨスガノソラ; lit. "Sky of Connection") is a Japanese romance drama eroge visual novel developed by CUFFS ("Sphere"). The game was originally released for Windows on December 5, 2008. It was adapted into a serialized manga and an anime television series. A sequel/fan disk titled Haruka na Sora was released on October 24, 2009, containing new and expanded scenarios for several characters from the original game.

== Plot ==
Tragically orphaned by a car accident, the Kasugano twins travel to their grandparents' countryside residence in Okukozome via railcar, hoping to reconstruct the shards of a shattered life. These two lonely souls, physically alike yet spiritually divergent, are unaware of the challenges these conflicting expectations will unveil in the coming days. Uncertain of the future, Haruka Kasugano clings to memories, hoping to find the strength he needs to protect his ailing sister. As the tale develops, it tells four stories, each with one girl: Kazuha Migiwa, rich but kind; Akira Amatsume, polite but sad; Nao Yorihime, depressed but hopeful; Sora Kasugano, petite but fierce.

== Characters ==
=== Main ===
Haruka Kasugano (春日野 悠, Kasugano Haruka)
Voiced by: Hiro Shimono (anime, teenager), Megumi Matsumoto (anime, child)
The protagonist of the series, with a gentle appearance and slim profile, Haruka, in many ways, is the spitting image of his fraternal twin sister, Sora. Personable and honest, he forges lasting friendships with remarkable ease. Haruka copes with the loss of his parents with a stout heart, burdened with the knowledge that the future of his delicate sister depends on him. He cannot swim. Haruka is well regarded around the village, as their grandmother was once a doctor. The game depicts routes in which Haruka engages in romantic and sexual relationships with the story's heroines, including his sister.
Sora Kasugano (春日野 穹, Kasugano Sora)
Voiced by: Hiroko Taguchi (game [credited as "Shiranami"], anime)
She is a quiet, fragile and reclusive girl, fraternal twin sister to the protagonist. Frail since birth, Sora was denied the sort of independent life that many take for granted. Yet beneath Sora's angelic doll-like appearance lies a troublesome personality prone to emotional withdrawal, intellectual and physical laziness, and a severe lack of social graces. She spends most of her time surfing the Internet and eating crisps and instant food, so long as Haruka is by her side. Her strong bond with her brother strengthened as a result of the tragic loss of their parents and a kiss they shared as children, leads her to fantasize about incest, and she goes to great lengths to seduce him or at least to get him to spend more time with her. She hates Nao due to Nao raping Haruka, although it is implied that they were all once good friends. She is often seen clinging to a stuffed rabbit toy, which she received as a present from her mother before she died, which lends her a deceptively childlike character.
Nao Yorihime (依媛 奈緒, Yorihime Nao)
Voiced by: Yuka Inokuchi (game [credited as "Ayaka Kimura"], anime)
Beautiful, intelligent and an excellent swimmer, Nao is Haruka's next-door neighbor and childhood friend, one year older than Haruka. When the Kasugano twins last visited the area, their departure was particularly painful for Nao, who, for some reason, had grown quite close to Haruka after having raped him on one occasion, about which she expresses guilt. Upon their return, she rekindles their former close relationship. Nao's compassion and maturity project a sense of sisterly love towards others, though for Haruka, there is a deeper and more intimate feeling. In her route and in the anime, she has a relationship with Haruka where at first Sora disagrees and even hates her, but after Nao saves her stuffed rabbit from a fire she seems to accept their relationship. In the end, Haruka and Nao make love while everyone else watches the fireworks.
Akira Amatsume (天女目 瑛, Amatsume Akira)
Voiced by: Mana Tsukishiro (game), Kayo Sakata (anime)
Akira is Haruka's energetic classmate with an innocent personality that makes befriending the girl second nature. Her enthusiasm is contagious to those around her. She was orphaned as a baby and taken in by the keeper of the local shinto shrine and raised as his granddaughter when none of her more distant relatives were willing to take her. Although still a teenager, Akira has been the only miko and shrine keeper since her foster grandfather died. She spends much of her time practicing the habits and traditions, including performance of requisite ceremonies and holiday festivals. She also devotes much of her time to helping the elderly in the village, making her beloved by all. It is strongly implied that she is the illegitimate daughter of Kazuha's father. In her route and the anime, she and Haruka start a relationship, but it is Akira herself, due to her insecurities, who tries to end it, but Haruka prevents her and tries to help her. In the end, after Haruka helps Akira find out who her real mother is, she thanks him, and they both resume their relationship and make love while promising to be together forever.
Kazuha Migiwa (渚 一葉, Migiwa Kazuha)
Voiced by: Ryōko Ono (game [credited as "Nazuna Gogyo"], anime)
Haruka's classmate, the beautiful daughter of an influential magnate, Kazuha lives a cultured life that could be compared to that of a modern princess. Sharp-minded and attentive to detail as a result of her parents' constant travels and long-distance liaisons, she learned from a young age to behave responsibly, as befitting her social standing. Nevertheless, Kazuha does not consider herself superior to others and doesn't hesitate to lend a helping hand whenever asked. Kazuha is an experienced viola player, yet she shies away from competing, preferring to play only for those she cares for. She dotes on Akira constantly and worries excessively for her well-being, and this leads to some speculation that they may be romantically involved. It is revealed (implied) that they are half-sisters with Kazuha referring to Akira as sister. Kazuha's excessive concern for Akira stems from her desire to make up for her mother's refusal to acknowledge Akira's existence and her father's apparent neglect of her. In her route and in the anime, she and Haruka fall in love. In the end, Haruka manages to overcome the problems with Kazuha's father because she thought he was ignoring his half-sister Akira, and Kazuha also manages to start a relationship with Haruka, eventually playing a song on the viola that they remembered because they made love while listening to the song.

=== Supporting ===
Kozue Kuranaga (倉永 梢, Kuranaga Kozue)
Voiced by: Yukari Minegishi (game [credited as "Airi Himekawa"], anime)
Representative of Haruka, Ryouhei, Kazuha and Akira's class, often nicknamed "class rep". She fell in love at first sight with Haruka due to his gentle profile and appearance. Kozue is seen by others as a shy but serious person who is also very polite, but through her shy and responsible appearance, she has a "delusion mode" in which she imagines being in a romantic relationship with Haruka due to her crush on him. In Sora's storyline, she and Nao are the ones who later catch the twins having sex, and she can't accept their relationship the most due to her feelings towards Haruka. At the end of the final episode, she questions Nao if she is in love; all that matters is her feelings. In Haruka na Sora she is the protagonist of her own route.
Yahiro Ifukube (伊福部 やひろ, Ifukube Yahiro)
Voiced by: Ryōko Tanaka (game [credited as "Hikaru Isshiki"], anime)
Best friend to Motoka Nogisaka and proprietor of a family-owned candy store, the rough-looking Yahiro would prefer spending her time sleeping and drinking. In truth, her ill-tempered and sardonic mannerisms hide Yahiro's true personality: a woman whose past is littered with lost dreams, forgotten promises, and broken romances. She has been Akira's unofficial guardian since her foster grandfather died and none of his relatives were willing to look after her. In an attempt to understand the undercurrents that he perceives surrounding Akira and Kazuha, Haruka persuades Yahiro to explain that, unbeknownst to the other characters, Akira's father has been aiding her financially since she had spent her savings from when she worked in the city as well as the scant earnings from the candy store to pay for Akira's education and other needs. In Haruka na Sora, she shows a cuter side of her as a tsundere in her route.
Motoka Nogisaka (乃木坂 初佳, Nogisaka Motoka)
Voiced by: Tae Okajima (game [credited as "Soyogi Tono"], anime)
Motoka is working as a maid in the Migiwa Household, and graduated from junior college two years ago. While not ideally suited for household chores, her warm compassion and captivating personality offset these deficiencies. She is best friends with Ifukube Yahiro, a notoriously heavy drinker, which makes Motoka's low tolerance to alcohol a particularly hazardous social issue, especially since she has a particular fondness for the taste of sake. She is the star of the anime's omake bonus feature, in which she entertains people with her skilled impressions of other characters, and eventually falls in love with Haruka despite him being significantly younger than her. At the end of the omake, located in the final chapter, Motoka gets to marry Haruka, who is the only one of all the heroines who manages to do so.
Ryouhei Nakazato (中里 亮平, Nakazato Ryōhei)
Voiced by: Sai Ushirono (game), Takurou Nakakuni (anime)
Haruka's classmate. For all his faults and freakish behavior, Ryouhei is a person who can always be counted on despite being a confessed idiot. Carefree and spontaneous, he brands himself as the ultimate ladies' man, applying cheesy pickup lines whenever a pretty face draws near. Yet when the situation calls for it, Ryouhei can offer profoundly sound advice with an eye that quickly identifies the root of a problem.

== Development ==
=== Staff ===
- Illustrations by: Takashi Hashimoto, Hiro Suzuhira
- Script by: Yukiji Tachikaze, Seiri Asakura
- Music by: Manack

=== Release history ===
The game was originally released for Windows PC on December 5, 2008. A sequel/fan disk titled Haruka na Sora was released on October 24, 2009. It contains full scenarios for Kozue and Yahiro, an expansion to Sora's story from the original game, and additional bonus material.

== Adaptations ==
=== Anime ===
Yosuga no Sora was adapted into a 12-episode anime series that aired on October 4, 2010. Each episode consists of a 22-minute feature segment and a 3-minute omake segment. The anime's main plot is presented in a multi-arc branching format that independently tells the stories of Kazuha, Akira, Nao, and Sora while sharing certain common episodes. The title of each episode incorporates the names of the characters it concerns. The bonus segment focuses on Motoka's story, relying more extensively on humor and super deformed character designs. Each segment has its own ending credit sequence in each episode. The anime's opening theme is "Hiyoku no Hane"-(比翼の羽根) by eufonius, and the ending themes are "Tsunagukizuna"-(ツナグキズナ) by Nekocan feat. Junca Amaoto, and "Pinky Jones"-(ピンキー・ジョーンズ) by Momoiro Clover.

The first volume of the series was released by King Records for DVD and Blu-ray Disc formats on December 22, 2010, and the final fourth volume was released on March 26, 2011, with a limited edition Blu-ray Disc, including the stuffed toy strap of Sora Kasugano.

The series premiered on Toku in the United States on December 31, 2015.

==== Episode list ====
ep. 1
ep. 2 | ep. 7
ep. 3 | ep. 5 | ep. 8 | ep. 10
ep. 4 | ep. 6 | ep. 9 | ep. 11
ep. 12
Kazuha | Akira | Nao | Sora

(In parentheses are the episode numbers for each arc, e.g. (A3) is the third episode in Akira's arc. Legend: A-Akira, K-Kazuha, N-Nao, S-Sora.)

The arcs' episodes presented in order are: K: 1–4; A:1–2, 5–6; N: 1, 7–9; S: 1, 7, 10–12. Episodes of an extra arc, that of Motoka, occur at the end of each episode.

| No. | Title | Original release date |
|---|---|---|
| 1 (AKNS1) | "Distant Memories"; Transliteration: "Haruka na Kioku" (Japanese: ハルカナキオク) | October 4, 2010 |
After the sudden death of their parents, Haruka and his twin sister Sora move to the house formerly inhabited by their late grandfather, in a small village they often visited as children. There, Haruka encounters several of the residents, some of whom are old friends, but Sora stays at home, refusing to go to school even as Haruka starts attending. Realizing that Haruka is growing increasingly distant and slipping from her grasp, Sora goes to Haruka's room at night and appeals to Haruka as she removes her clothes...
| 2 (AK2) | "Akira Embarrassed"; Transliteration: "Akira Hazukashi" (Japanese: アキラハズカシ) | October 11, 2010 |
Sora asks Haru to take her measurements so she can have a uniform made and finally starts attending school with Haruka. However, she is disappointed that she and Haruka are in different classes. While cleaning the swimming pool as part of a mixed gym, Akira accidentally soaks Kazuha, who forgot her swimsuit, and so Akira takes her to dry off. Haruka finds Kazuha's phone and goes to return it, only to overhear a sensual-sounding conversation in which Kazuha addresses Akira as "Onee-chan" (big sister).
| 3 (K3) | "A Careful Distance" (Fansub: "Indecision"); Transliteration: "Tsukazu Hanarezu" (Japanese: ツカズハナレズ) | October 18, 2010 |
When Kazuha realizes that Haruka has overheard their conversation, she chases him down to clear up any misunderstanding. She reveals that Akira is, in fact, her illegitimate older sister, born of a different mother. Due to her family's societal standing, Kazuha's father cannot acknowledge Akira as his daughter, causing Kazuha to resent her father and feel a burden of guilt and responsibility towards the always-hard-working Akira. To help lift Kazuha's spirits, Haruka invites her out on a date, and they subsequently realize and admit their rapidly progressing feelings towards each other. Meanwhile, Akira continues to try her best on her own, but collapses, apparently due to exhaustion.
| 4 (K4) | "Haruka's Heart"; Transliteration: "Harukazu Hāto" (Japanese: ハルカズハート) | October 25, 2010 |
On their way home from school, Haruka and Kazuha are interrupted by a frantic Yahiro, who is concerned over the non-appearance of the always-responsible Akira. They discover Akira at her home, collapsed due to exhaustion, and Kazuha proceeds to blame herself and her infatuation with Haruka for not noticing Akira's condition. Akira recovers a few days later but confronts Kazuha about her abandonment of Haruka and the inappropriate sense of guilt she feels regarding their father's actions. Realizing the truth of Akira's words, Kazuha withdraws into a state of depression while struggling to determine what to do. The day of the festival arrives, and Kazuha works up the courage to appear, where she is reunited with Haruka. Haruka informs Kazuha that her father has been supporting Akira financially in secret all this time. When Kazuha witnesses her father praising Akira, she realizes that she has misjudged him. Thus, she could move past her codependency toward Akira and pursue a whole-hearted romantic relationship with Haruka.
| 5 (A3) | "Darkness Brightens" (Fansub: "Darkness Revealed"); Transliteration: "Yami Akiraka ni" (Japanese: ヤミアキラカニ) | November 1, 2010 |
The introduction to this episode replays the event where Haruka was standing near the girls' locker room, overhearing Akira's and Kazuha's conversation. Still, this time, instead of walking away misled, Akira comes out and takes the phone from Haruka. This allows for the story to have an alternative ending. Haruka notices that Akira has been acting strange lately, and decides to talk to her alone at school the next morning. He sees the sad look on Akira's face becomes worried, and wants to help Akira find her mother's pendant (after remembering her losing it as a child). They search for the pendant by a tree they would play by as kids, only to Haruka's horror that a landslide had removed the tree. He attempts to dig around for it but without any luck. The two go to Akira's residence to bathe and have a romantic moment together. From there, Haruka goes to the festival and, after seeing Akira cry while dancing the sacred dance, rushes off to see what has happened.
| 6 (A4) | "I Won't Give Up"; Transliteration: "Akiramenai yo" (Japanese: アキラメナイヨ) | November 8, 2010 |
Haruka enters Akira's room and stops her from burning something, which is the doctor's missing journal, where it is written that Kazuha and Akira have a chance of mistaken identity. With the journal, he suggests to Yahiro and Kazuha a DNA test to prove things once and for all. Yahiro refuses, but, despite disapproval from her mother, Kazuha agrees. Haruka informs Akira at the shrine the next day that the DNA results will be out in five days, but Akira disappears on the fifth day. Haruka finds her at the train station, where they talk until the evening. When the DNA results arrive that night, Kazuha and Sora deliver it to Akira, who is still at the station, but she buckles, too scared to read it. It is then that Kazuha's mother appears and tells everything at their home, where Akira is shown the lost pendant, which was returned to her by someone who found it in the mountains, based on the name engraved on its back. She reveals that she and Akira's mother had shared the same hospital room, and, one day, Akira pulled the pendant off of her neck, and Mrs. Migiwa held her in her arms. After hearing that Akira's mother had died, she gave the pendant to her to make her feel, at least, the presence of a mother. Akira then reads the DNA results, and it reads negative, which means Akira is born of a different mother. Kazuha's mother lets her keep the pendant there and apologizes to Akira. She later confesses her love for Haruka and vice versa.
| 7 (NS2) | "Sinful Maidens"; Transliteration: "Tsumi na Otomera" (Japanese: ツミナオトメラ) | November 15, 2010 |
This episode replays the event where Sora asks Haru to take her measurements so she can have a uniform made. The next day Nao comes over to bring Haruka some mosquito repellent, since Sora is scared of mosquitoes, and then leaves almost immediately. The next day Ryouhei invites Haruka to the school rooftop to take a peek at the girls cleaning the pool. Haruka warns Ryouhei, though, not to peek at Nao and leaves. Much later, Ryouhei tells Nao that Haruka, "the prince she has been waiting for," has a crush on her, but she thinks he does not like her. The truth is that something happened between the two many summers ago: Nao, trying to escape the noise of her arguing parents, ran to Haruka's house. At that time, Haruka was sleeping on their veranda and was surprised to see Nao on top of him with her clothes undone. Until now, Nao has felt guilty about what she did. However, Ryouhei, Akira, and Kazuha are involved in bringing Haruka and Nao together. They made the two meet at the school pool on a Sunday. When changing after the swimming lesson, Haruka rushes into the girls' locker room when Nao is scared by a black cat inside a box. The school supervisor hears their chatter, but the two could hide inside a box before he catches them. Thinking it was just the cat, he leaves. There, Nao gets to know that Haruka does not hate her, only that he was just surprised at the events of that summer day, dispelling her assumptions. Meanwhile, Sora shows her hatred of Nao, whom she thinks is why Haruka has been preoccupied the past couple of days at home on her laptop.
| 8 (N3) | "The Sky. Still Dark." (Fansub: "Darkened Sky"); Transliteration: "Nao Kuraki Sora" (Japanese: ナオクラキソラ) | November 22, 2010 |
By now Sora is showing her hatred of Nao in the open, even in front of Ryouhei and Nao herself. One afternoon Sora, attracted by the smell of curry cooking in the kitchen, catches Haruka and Nao having intercourse in the living room. Sora throws Nao out of the house, warning her not to see Haruka ever again since it is the second time she catches the two doing the "dirty deed." She then throws the curry they cooked down the drain, as she only wants Haruka's cooking. Nao is desolate after that, and though she wants to see Haruka, she has to hide because Sora is always nearby. However, Haruka is always optimistic Sora will forgive and accept them both, as he, after knowing from Ryouhei that she changed, wants Nao to return to being a cheerful, caring, and lighthearted person. Sora lightens up a bit to the sight of Haruka and Nao being together, but still has some resistance, and prefers to distance herself from the two. It is for this reason that she never joined Haruka and Nao, along with Ryouhei, Kazuha, Akira, and Motoka, for the annual summer trip to the beach.
| 9 (N4) | "Distant Feelings"; Transliteration: "Haruka na Omoi" (Japanese: ハルカナオモイ) | November 29, 2010 |
Sora decides to follow everyone at the beach, but at the moment she got off the bus, she heard news of a young man that was rescued from drowning unconscious. As Sora looks over, she finds out that the boy in question is Haruka. However, Nao acted quickly and performed mouth-to-mouth resuscitation. With that event, Sora becomes even more insecure, eventually telling Haruka not to leave home and making excuses just to make him stay. One day, Sora makes Haruka choose between her and Nao, but he just shrugs it off and proceeds to school with Nao as if nothing is wrong. That afternoon, Haruka finds Sora missing after receiving a text from her saying, "Let's leave here." Akira, Kazuha, and Ryouhei join Nao and Haruka in search of her until, amidst the rain, Nao finds Sora at the bus stop. Refusing to go with Nao, Sora runs out of the bus stop, angrily telling her that she is the reason why Haruka has changed. Suddenly, a bolt of lightning strikes the bus stop and burst into flames. Sora then remembers she forgot her stuffed bunny inside. Nao rushes in to retrieve the only memento Sora has of her mother, causing her to be nearly trapped inside. After receiving the rescued item, Sora reveals to Nao her insecurities with her, that she is afraid Haruka would leave her alone. The next night, Sora joins everyone during the Summer Festival at the shrine. This time, Sora is more receptive to Nao.
| 10 (S3) | "Imitating the Bird's Cry" (Fansub: "As for a Bird's Faked Cry"); Transliteration: "Tori no Sorane wa" (Japanese: トリノソラネハ) | December 6, 2010 |
This episode replays the event where Haruka is trying to talk to Sora about his relationship with Nao. Still, this time, Sora is always at the back of his mind since, lately, she seems not to accept Nao, and she seems to be teasing him. Haruka suggests a date with Nao, but cannot get to tell Sora about it, even disguising it as if he will be spending time with Ryouhei. During the date, though, Nao notices that Sora is never far from Haruka's mind; he buys things for his sister rather than for her and eventually spoils their date. They plan to make croquette curry upon arriving home but is canceled when Haruka finds Sora not feeling well in her room after having a bad dream. The next day, Nao notices that Haruka tries to hide his date with her from Sora, but she goes along. One night, Haruka catches Sora masturbating in her room while mentioning his name, much to his dismay—she has been enamored with him ever since that one summer day in their childhood when Haruka kissed Sora while playing.
| 11 (S4) | "The Uncertain Pair"; Transliteration: "Sorameku Futari" (Japanese: ソラメクフタリ) | December 13, 2010 |
Haruka takes Nao on a date again, but he cannot shake the sight of Sora masturbating that night off from his mind. Eventually, Haruka hits his limit and tries to get rid of those thoughts by taking Nao to a love hotel, but she rejects his act and asks if he really loves her. Haruka is unable to answer and returns home. Soon after, Sora gets a fever and Haruka stays home to take care of her. That evening, Sora, with her fever subsided, confesses her feelings to Haruka and the two make love, beginning a relationship. This did not go unnoticed, as everyone, especially Kozue and Nao, begins to see the twins spend more and more time with each other. One afternoon, when Kozue and Nao decide to visit the Kasugano residence, they catch the twins in the middle of sexual intercourse.
| 12 (S5) | "Towards the Distant Sky" (Fansub: "To the Distant Sky"); Transliteration: "Haruka na Sora e" (Japanese: ハルカナソラヘ) | December 20, 2010 |
Kozue runs away in shock at the sight of the twins having sex, while Nao calmly leaves the scene, but Sora doesn't even care. Haruka thinks of ditching school, but she tells him to think little of it. Kozue tells him the next day that she'll never talk to him again, while Nao effectively ends her relationship with him after his apology. That night, Haruka fights with Sora when he tells her they should stop doing it, even inadvertently hitting her. Things get complicated when they find out that their parents left no money for the two, and in order to survive they have to be taken under custody of their relatives, but this means them living apart. That afternoon, Haruka awakens to find Sora missing and her room in a mess. He goes looking for her after receiving a text from Sora, which sounds like a suicide note. Nao even helps him look for her everywhere, mentioning her confrontation with Sora, saying she has seen the two making love that summer day and that "now they are even." Haruka then remembered the lake Akira mentioned the other day. Haruka finds Sora, and his attempt to stop her from going deeper into the lake nearly ends in them drowning. Days later the two leave the place to live together overseas in the city where an artisan who had connections with their parents lived, hoping to find happiness elsewhere. Even though Kozue is unwilling to accept them, Nao believes they will do just fine.

=== Drama CD ===
There are five drama CDs: two released with the purchase of the original visual novel Yosuga no Sora from stores Sofmap and Messe Sanoh, one released with the pre-ordering of its Fan Disc Haruka na Sora, and two released with the purchase of the Blu-ray volumes 2 and 4 of its anime adaptation.

| Title | Affiliation | Kind |
|---|---|---|
| "秘密のリゾート遊び" | Yosuga no Sora | (Exclusive) Retailer Bonus: Sofmap |
| "叉依姫神社祭り" | Yosuga no Sora | (Exclusive) Retailer Bonus: Messe Sanoh |
| "ソイネノソラ" | Haruka na Sora | (Exclusive) Pre-ordering Bonus |
| "添い寝CD（依媛奈緒／春日野穹）" | Yosuga no Sora (anime) | Blu-ray Bonus |
| "添い寝CD（渚一葉／天女目瑛）" | Yosuga no Sora (anime) | Blu-ray Bonus |

=== Manga ===
Yosuga no Sora was adapted into a manga of the same title, illustrated by Takashi Mikaze, and serialized from October 2009 to January 2011 issues of Kadokawa Shoten's Comp Ace magazine. It was compiled into two volumes.

=== Music ===
Sphere released the original game's OST, with music composed by Manack, on February 27, 2009.

The OST for the anime adaptation, with music composed by Manabu Miwa (Manack) and Jun Ichikawa (Bruno Wen-li), consists of both new compositions and newly arranged versions of tracks from the original game. It was released on two CDs, subtitled "Arrange" and "New", accompanying the Japanese Blu-ray disc release of the anime with volumes 1 and 3 respectively.

There are nine music releases: three affiliated with the original visual novel Yosuga no Sora, one affiliated with its fan disc Haruka na Sora, and five affiliated with its anime adaptation. Some titles are not consistent among official, retailers, and databases, thus their normalized titles are given following style guidelines from MusicBrainz.

| Title (Normalized) | Affiliation | Kind |
|---|---|---|
| "ヨスガノソラ: Image" | Yosuga no Sora | (Exclusive) limited editionbonus |
| "ヨスガノソラ" | Yosuga no Sora | Commercial album |
| "ヨスガノソラ: Maxi-Single" | Yosuga no Sora | Commercial album |
| "ハルカナソラ: キャラクターソング" | Haruka na Sora | (Exclusive) Limited Edition Bonus |
| "比翼の羽根" | Yosuga no Sora (anime) | Commercial album |
| "ツナグキズナ" | Yosuga no Sora (anime) | Commercial album |
| "ピンキージョーンズ" | Yosuga no Sora (anime) | Commercial album |
| "ヨスガノソラ: New" | Yosuga no Sora (anime) | Blu-ray bonus |
| "ヨスガノソラ: Arrange" | Yosuga no Sora (anime) | Blu-ray bonus |

== See also ==
- Aki Sora – Japanese manga series
