= Maburaho =

Japanese light novel and anime series

- Cover of the first light novel (Kindle version)

まぶらほ
- Genre: Fantasy, harem
- Light novel
- Written by: Toshihiko Tsukiji
- Illustrated by: Eiji Komatsu
- Published by: Fujimi Shobo
- Imprint: Fujimi Fantasia Bunko
- Magazine: Dragon Magazine
- Original run: August 2000 – January 2011
- Volumes: 30
- Manga
- Written by: Toshihiko Tsukiji
- Illustrated by: Miki Miyashita
- Published by: Kadokawa Shoten
- English publisher: AUS: Madman Entertainment; NA: ADV Manga
- Magazine: Monthly Dragon Age
- Original run: April 9, 2003 – September 9, 2004
- Volumes: 2
- Manga
- Written by: Toshihiko Tsukiji
- Illustrated by: Kinoto Sensōji
- Published by: Fujimi Shobo
- Magazine: Monthly Dragon Age
- Original run: 2005 – 2006
- Volumes: 2
- Anime television series
- Directed by: Shinichiro Kimura
- Produced by: Masato Matsubayashi; Shigeaki Tomioka; Takashi Tachizaki; Tsuneo Takechi; Yuji Matsukura
- Written by: Koichi Taki
- Music by: Koichi Korenaga; Ryo Sakai
- Studio: J.C.Staff
- Licensed by: Crunchyroll; AUS: Madman Entertainment; NA: ADV Films
- Original network: WOWOW
- Original run: October 14, 2003 – April 6, 2004
- Episodes: 24

Maburaho (Japanese: まぶらほ) is a Japanese romantic school comedy light novel series written by Toshihiko Tsukiji, illustrated by Eiji Komatsu and serialized in Gekkan Dragon Magazine. The light novel was adapted into a manga illustrated by Miki Miyashita and later developed into a 24 episode anime series produced by J.C.Staff and broadcast by WOWOW in Japan.

The series is about the story of Kazuki Shikimori, a second year student of the prestigious magic school, Aoi Academy. Unlike ordinary people who can use magic fewer than a hundred times and several of his classmates, who can use magic several thousand times, Kazuki can only use his magic eight times before he turns to ash. His life changes when it is revealed that Kazuki is descended from a line of world-famous magicians and he has the potential to father the most powerful magician in the world. Suddenly three girls, Yuna Miyama, Kuriko Kazetsubaki and Rin Kamishiro, enter Kazuki's life in order to obtain his valuable genes.

A.D. Vision (ADV) acquired the English language distribution rights of the anime series in March 2004 and released it under its ADV Films division. Later the same year, ADV acquired the English language rights to the manga, which is released under the ADV Manga division.

== Plot ==
Maburaho is set in a world where every character has the ability to use magic, however everyone's magic is not equal. Each person in the story has a different degree of magic and a set number of times that they can use their magic. The average person is able to use magic fewer than a hundred times, however some people are able to use magic several thousand times. Because of this, a person's social standing is determined by the number of times that he or she can perform magic. If someone uses up all of their magic, their body turns to ash and is scattered into the winds.

The series first introduces us to Kazuki Shikimori, a second year student from an elite magic school, Aoi Academy. However, unlike his classmates, Kazuki can only use his magic eight times before he turns to dust. As a result, he is at the bottom of the school's social pecking order. However things change one day when Yuna Miyama shows up in his dorm room and declares that she is his wife. Moments later, Kuriko Kazetsubaki and Rin Kamishiro appear at Kazuki's dorm, the former in order to obtain his genes and the latter to kill him to escape her obligation to marry him. Kazuki learns that he is a descendant of most of the world's greatest magicians from both the eastern and western worlds. Even though he has a feeble spell count, his offspring has the potential of becoming a powerful magician.

Despite his weak spell count, each spell he performs is treated as an epic event. Kazuki's magic is referred to as the most powerful magic in the world able to achieve miracles. Due to Kazuki's kindness, his spell count begins to drop as he uses his magic on behalf of each girl. First by making it snow in the middle of summer to cheer up Yuna. Second by pulling Yuna out of a vortex that also merges the boy's and girl's dorms together. Kazuki uses his magic again to destroy two Behemoths in order to save Kuriko, who was unable to defeat them. And then, Kazuki reverses time to save Rin's homemade box lunch. He also uses it to save his childhood friend Chihaya Yamase after a monster summoned by Kazuki's classmates appeared at the school festival. Not long after, Yuna accidentally releases an incurable retrovirus on herself which also creates a doppelganger of her with the opposite of all her qualities (ex. the real Yuna loves Kazuki, the clone wants to kill him). Kazuki uses his sixth spell to obliterate the clone. Finally, Kazuki uses his last two charges in order to save Yuna's life from the virus.

Each event leaves an impression on the girls and they attempt to keep Kazuki from using any more of his magic and eventually search for ways to increase his spell count. However, their attempts fail when halfway through the series Kazuki uses the last of his magic to save Yuna from the magical retrovirus. However, while Kazuki turned to ash and the ashes scattered, his ghost remains.

At this point in the story, Shino Akai appears in order to capture Kazuki and add him to her ghost collection. The girls try to protect Kazuki from Shino and eventually learn that Kazuki's ashes had been scattered into each of their own hearts. But before Kazuki's ashes were completely returned to him, Shino informs Rin and later the rest of the girls that this is not the first time someone's ashes have been scattered and later restored. However, when Kazuki's ashes are returned to him and his body restored, he will lose all of his memories. Knowing this, the girls still return Kazuki's ashes to him. At the very end of the anime series, it is shown that instead of losing his memories as a side effect of restoring his body, Kazuki has now split into ten different bodies.

In the novel, the side effect of Kazuki's restoration was gaining a special magical body that can cause disaster to the whole world if he lets out his magic powers. Another side effect of Kazuki's restoration is the overflowing of his magical powers every now and then causing minor mishaps and sometimes great chaos.

== Characters ==
From left to right: Rin Kamishiro, Kazuki Shikimori, Yuna Miyama, and Kuriko Kazetsubaki

=== Primary characters ===
Kazuki Shikimori (式森 和樹, Shikimori Kazuki)
The male protagonist, Kazuki, is a second year student from an elite magic school, Aoi Academy, with serious social problems, and because he has a low spell count of only eight spells, most of the other students, especially the girls, would not notice him. At the beginning of his second year it is revealed that he is descended from not only the most powerful of eastern mages, but the most powerful of western mages. Having both powerful bloodlines fused into one body means that despite his low spell count, he is capable of wielding nearly omnipotent power. He is therefore the most powerful character in the series. He is shown to have feelings for Yuna as her kiss was the one to bring him back to his human form.
Overall, Kazuki is a good person and helps others by using his magic, even when that means that he runs the risk of turning into ash. His selflessness and kindness eventually wins over the hearts of Rin and Kuriko. He is at times indecisive and not very courageous, but he prevalently shows his honest nature and his sense of doing the right thing.
Voiced by: Daisuke Sakaguchi (Japanese); Blake Shepard (English)
Yuna Miyama (宮間 夕菜, Miyama Yuna)
Yuna, the typical harem anime "housewife", transfers to Aoi Academy to become Kazuki's wife and even first introduced herself as "Yuna Shikimori" to the rest of Kazuki's class. Yuna is the only one who actually cares for Kazuki from the very beginning instead of just being interested in his genes. As the series progress, Yuna becomes extremely possessive of Kazuki and becomes very jealous when other girls show any kind of interests in him. Even later on the hair sticking out of her head acts as a locator to be able to find Kazuki.
Using flashbacks, it is explained that Yuna and Kazuki first met each other when they were still children. Yuna was crying because she was about to move away, but after hearing Kazuki introduce himself as the greatest magician in the world, she begged him to use his magic so that she and her parents would not have to move. Instead, she settles on having him make it snow on a warm summer's day with a promise to become Kazuki's bride if he can do it.
Tsukiji states in an interview in Newtype USA that Yuna was the first character that "popped" into his head, so he created the two other characters to be different from her.
Voiced by: Hitomi Nabatame (Japanese); Jessica Boone (English)
Kuriko Kazetsubaki (風椿 玖里子, Kazetsubaki Kuriko)
At the beginning of the story, Kuriko's only interest in Kazuki is to obtain his genes for the wealthy and influential Kazetsubaki family and the stature that goes with being the mother of a powerful sorcerer. A third year student and a member of the student government, Kuriko takes great pleasure in flirting with Kazuki and teasing Yuna. Often she will appear out of nowhere into Kazuki's arms or lap right in front of Yuna or use her body, charm, or her family's resources to seduce Kazuki. Kuriko gradually falls in love with him. Of the three girls, Kuriko demonstrates to be the most knowledgeable with regards to magic and the politics surrounding magic. She has an extremely high magic count, and it is considered to be among the strongest, though it is nowhere near as strong as Kazuki's. Near the beginning of the series, Kuriko finds herself playing "mother" to the ghost girl Elizabeth after an incident that resulted in both the boys and girls dorms merging together by one of Kazuki's magical spells.
Voiced by: Yuki Matsuoka (Japanese); Tiffany Grant (English)
Rin Kamishiro (神城 凜, Kamishiro Rin)
The third prominent female character, Rin is a competent swordswoman and a member of the Kamishiro branch family. Rin has a reserved and dignified personality and always dresses in a samurai-style kimono that is suitable to her warrior nature. Rin is ordered by the head family to secure Kazuki's genes in order to ensure the Kamishiro family's dominance, which according to Kuriko, has been weakening because of the number of branch families. At the beginning of the story, Rin would prefer to kill Kazuki than be forced to marry someone whom, in her words, has bad grades, no athletic prowess, and no redeeming values. However, as the story progress, she gradually softens up to Kazuki and even begins to smile after witnessing his kindness and compassion towards others, including herself. Kazuki is the only one who could eat her horrendous cooking, and was totally honest about it.
Voiced by: Yuka Inokuchi (Japanese); Kim Prause (English)

=== Supporting characters ===
Chihaya Yamase (山瀬 千早, Yamase Chihaya)
First appearing in the anime during the Aoi Fest, Chihaya, or Yamase as Kazuki calls her, is Kazuki's childhood friend and is in the same year as Kazuki at Aoi Academy. Tsukiji describes Chihaya as a comet that circles around and visits our system every once in a while. For most of their childhood, Chihaya did everything she could to prevent Kazuki from using any of his magic. However, when they got older, Kazuki began avoiding her making her feel like Kazuki hated her.
Chihaya makes three appearances in the anime series, the first appearance during the Aoi Fest when she asks Kazuki if their classes would join together to produce a play. However after the festival, Chihaya moves away. Chihaya's second appearance occurs when the students of Aoi Academy take a field trip to Kyoto after Kazuki has become a ghost. It is through her that it is learned that each of the girls contains a portion of Kazuki's ashes.
Chihaya makes one final appearance at the very end when she visits Kazuki. Even though his ashes returned from all four girls, Kazuki has not return to normal. It is soon revealed that Kazuki made the same promise to Chihaya as he did with Yuna moments before Kazuki met Yuna. Chihaya believed that Kazuki made it snow for her and that misunderstanding led Kazuki to avoid her. Because of that event, Yuna and Chihaya jointly hold the last portion of Kazuki's ashes.
In the novel, Chihaya was a character in the side stories that was released along with the novel, but not part of the main story itself. In the side stories, Chihaya is not Kazuki's childhood friend but just a student from another class that had a crush on Kazuki. Chihaya is a shy and inward character and does not have the proper chance to convey her feelings to Kazuki.
Voiced by: Mai Nakahara (Japanese); Luci Christian (English)
Dr. Haruaki Akai (紅尉 晴明, Akai Haruaki)
It is through Dr. Akai's monologue at the beginning of the series that the world of Maburaho is explained. The resident (and rather bishōnen) doctor of Aoi Academy, Dr. Akai is a formidable wizard with great powers of his own. Despite his laid-back appearance, he has Kazuki's best interests at heart. Throughout the series Dr. Akai uses a variety of eye lenses that he carries around and through which he uses his magic. Dr. Akai is quite smitten with Kaori Iba, and sometimes comments to her that he has a "special bed" in the nurse's office just for her.
Dr. Akai's main interest in Kazuki is that of a research subject, especially after Kazuki becomes a ghost. During the recap of events in episode 20, he reveals that this is the second time he has seen someone's body being restored after their ashes had been scattered. But while he knows how to restore Kazuki's body, he does not reveal the information to Yuna, Kuriko, or Rin.
Voiced by: Kōji Tsujitani (Japanese); Jason Douglas (English)
Shino Akai (紅尉 紫乃, Akai Shino)
Shino enters the story after Kazuki becomes a ghost. She attempts to capture Kazuki and make him part of her ghost collection, but is thwarted by her older brother, Dr. Akai. Afterwards, she becomes an assistant under her brother, but she still tries to make Kazuki part of her collection for personal reasons. At the end of the series, it is revealed that she along with Karei, Kazuki's dorm manager, were in a similar situation as Yuna, Rin, and Kuriko and tries her best to convince them that restoring Kazuki's body is pointless. She is powerful with seals and great in combat exceeding both Kuriko and Rin. She does not hate Kazuki, but feels that a tragedy will repeat itself if the girls persist on their goal. It is hinted that she has feelings for Kazuki since her brother had asked her why she kept hesitating to put Kazuki into her collection, even though she could have done so at any time. It is also believed that Shino and her brother, Dr. Akai and Karei are somehow "ghosts" as in episode 23 she flashes back to when Japan was still in the era of Warring States, and how the Manager told her to "keep her promise", like they promised long ago. In the last episode of the anime, one of the "Kazuki's" went to her for a health checkup and at the end, she tells Kazuki about a "new bed" and tells him to come over whenever he wants, showing that she is fully in love with him the same way her brother is from Kaori Iba.
Voiced by: Yoshino Takamori (Japanese); Monica Rial (English)
Elizabeth (エリザベート, Erizabēto)
It is explained in the story that Elizabeth is a ghost of a young girl who was once a member of a noble family during the Holy Roman Empire. Elizabeth is first introduced in the third episode when she moves into Kazuki's dorm room. She once lived in an old mansion that was located between the girls and boys dorms until a group of real-estate agents from the Kazetsubaki group drove her out. After Kazuki and Yuna make an unsuccessful attempt to retrieve a suit of armor for her, Elizabeth creates a magical vortex which sucks Yuna in. Elizabeth threatened to torture her so Kazuki uses his magic to save Yuna, who ended up being tickled instead of tortured. Kazuki's magic resulted in the girls dormitory being pulled toward and merging into the boys dorm.
When Elizabeth sees Kuriko, who resembles Elizabeth's mother, lift up a helmet, it reminded her of a knight that guarded her and Elizabeth adopts Kuriko as her new mother. From then on, Elizabeth lives in Kuriko's chest and often tries to help Kuriko with Kazuki. When Kazuki becomes a ghost at the midpoint of the story, Elizabeth tries to gives him advice in order to cheer him up. She also seems to get mad easily, and then starts to use her magic to destroy things in anguish.
Voiced by: Kimiko Koyama (Japanese); Sasha Paysinger (English)
Karei Hirosaki (尋崎 華怜, Hirosaki Karei)
Through most of the series Karei is seen sweeping in front of the boys dorms, which she manages. She is always seen wearing a sexy, black funeral outfit and often appears to be watching out for Kazuki, even after he becomes a ghost. At the end of the series, it is revealed that she along with the ghost collector, Shino, were in a similar situation as Yuna, Rin, and Kuriko. However, unlike Shino, Karei views that it is better for a person to be alive, even without their memories, than to remain a ghost.
While never directly stated in the series, there are strong hints that the man that Karei and Shino once loved is related to Kazuki. The first is that Karei pledges to watch over her love from the background, something she still does with Kazuki. Second is that Karei's love was a Shinto priest, while Kazuki is also descended from a line of Shinto priests. And finally is an overlay between Karei's love and Kazuki as Karei reminds Shino of their pledge to watch over their love.
Voiced by: Emi Shinohara (Japanese); Kelly Manison (English)
Kaori Iba (伊庭 かおり, Iba Kaori)
Yuna and Kazuki's homeroom teacher for the class of 2-B. She seems like a student herself, as she rarely if ever truly tries to exercise control over the class of 2-B. Instead, she enjoys spending her time playing video games, sometimes playing them while in the middle of teaching a class.
Voiced by: Junko Noda (Japanese); Christine Auten (English)
Class 2-B
Class 2-B is the most troublesome class at Aoi Academy. During the entire series, the students of the class are always coming up with schemes to make money and getting into fights which destroy parts of the school building. The more notable members of the class are:

Yokihiko Nakamaru (仲丸 由紀彦, Nakamaru Yokihiko)
Nakamaru is a greedy individual who pretends to be Kazuki's best friend, but is extremely jealous of Kazuki's relationship with Yuna and would try to exploit Kazuki's abilities for his own personal gain. In every case, his schemes always backfire, hurting him the most.
Voiced by: Ryō Naitō (Japanese); Christopher Ayres (English)
Sayumi Morisaki (杜崎 沙弓, Morisaki Sayumi)
She's a member of a rival house of Rin Kamishiro and is the only class member who does not participate in the class's schemes. Her clan happens to be masters of unarmed combat, and though she does not take part in the long-standing feud between her family and Rin's, she does want to compete honorably with Rin to finally determine who is the best.
Voiced by: Akeno Watanabe (Japanese); Kaytha Coker (English)
Kazumi Matsuda (松田 和美, Matsuda Kazumi)
An equally opportunistic girl who is often Nakamaru's foil.
Voiced by: Masumi Asano (Japanese); Kira Vincent Davis (English)

Maiho Kurioka (栗丘 舞穂, Kurioka Maiho)
Maiho is another of Kazuki's classmates. Maiho was introduced in the original novel just as the script for the anime series was finishing. At first, Shinichiro Kimura, director of the anime series, wanted to bring Maiho into the series but decided to focus on the relationships between Kazuki, Yuna, Kuriko, Rin and Chihaya, though Maiho does make an appearance in the final episode. According to Newtype USA, Maiho has the ability to neutralize magical powers. Because of this, she often tags along with Kazuki in order to keep his magic in check, much to Yuna's irritation.
Voiced by: Chiemi Chiba (Japanese); Cynthia Martinez (English)

=== Novel characters ===
Kentaro Miyama (宮間 健太郎, Miyama Kentaro)
Kentaro first appears in The Volume of Revival – Part 2 (South East). He is Yuna's father and an archeologist. However, the artifacts he uncovered end up being sold in the black market. Kentaro met his wife, Yukari, in Turkey where they fell in love at first sight and got married. But according to Kentaro, it seemed more like he had been forced in marriage.
Yukari Miyama (宮間 由香里, Miyama Yukari)
First appearing in The Volume of Revival – Part 6 (North West), Yukari is Yuna's mother who works as a broker in Italy. The first impression Yukari gave out to Kazuki was that she is a beautiful traditional Japanese woman, but actually she was the one who had taught Yuna that it is bad to lose, which had led to Yuna's easily jealous character. Yukari had once chased Kentaro all over the world before finally cornering him at the summit of Kilimanjaro and forced him into agreement to marry her.
Liera Scharnhorst (リーラ·シャルンホルスト, Rīra Sharunhorusuto)
Debuting in the side story, The Volume of Maids, Liera is the captain from the Maid Organization, MMM (More and More Maids) fifth armored company (commonly known as "Housekeeper"). Liera is very calm and cool and a marvel at housework. From nursing to piloting of a fighter aircraft, she can do anything; but when things come to Kazuki, she loses her composure. Kazuki has been appointed to be her next master and because of that Liera had been trying her best. Because of her love for Kazuki, Liera tends to easily forget about the existence of Yuna.
Kamiyo Yamase (山瀬 神代, Yamase Kamiyo)
Kamiyo is Chihaya's younger sister who makes her first appears in a side story in The Volume of Revival – Part 3 (South). Even though Kamiyo's magic and grades are above average, she was not accepted to Aoi Academy. Her ex-classmates state that she is cute enough to easily get herself a boyfriend. Kamiyo adores and idolizes her elder sister Chihaya. So when Kamiyo sees Chihaya in very depressed mood, Kamiyo decides to find out and fix the problem (Kazuki) for her older sister.

== Development ==
Maburaho was Toshihiko Tsukiji's first attempt at writing a romantic school comedy. Tsukiji inspired to write Maburaho after losing a previous novel competition hosted by Gekkan Dragon Magazine, the Dragon Cup. Tsukiji won the competition and Maburaho received high acclaim from Gekkan Dragon readers. In an interview in Newtype USA, Tsukiji states, "I kept two key words in mind, two things that are common to every teenage boy—school and girls." Tsukiji wanted to create three characters that were different from each other in every way.

Yuna Miyama introduces herself to the class as Yuna Shikimori.

Tsukiji originally conceived of ending the series after six installments with the death of Kazuki after using all of his magic, however the publisher asked him to extend the series. Instead of manipulating Kazuki's magic count, Tsukiji decided to continue the story with Kazuki as a ghost. "I figured it'd probably be most interesting if I made him a ghost," states Tsukiji.

When discussing the anime adaptation, Tsukiji states, "I was actually very inspired by a scene from Episode 1, the one where Yuna introduces herself." Tsukiji was amazed with how skillfully anime director Shinichiro Kimura and the voice actors were able to express each of the girls' personalities.

== Media ==
=== Novels ===
The novel series Maburaho is written by Toshihiko Tsukiji and illustrated by Eiji Komatsu. The novel is serialized in Gekkan Dragon Magazine and 30 volumes of Maburaho have been published as of February 2011.

The anime series had adapted the storyline until "The Volume of Being a Spirit – Part 3".

No.	Title	ISBN	Publication date
1	"No Girl No Cry" "Nō Gāru Nō Kurai" (ノー·ガール·ノー·クライ)	ISBN 4-8291-1387-1	October 2001
2	"The Volume of (Being a) Human" "Ningen no Maki" (にんげんの巻)	ISBN 4-8291-1397-9	December 2001
3	"The Volume of (Being a) Spirit – Part 1 (Top)" "Yūrei no Maki – Ue" (ゆうれいの巻·うえ)	ISBN 4-8291-1419-3	March 2002
4	"The Volume of (Being a) Spirit – Part 2 (Middle)" "Yūrei no Maki – Naka" (ゆうれいの巻·なか)	ISBN 4-8291-1448-7	July 2002
5	"The Volume of Maids" "Meido no Maki" (メイドの巻)	ISBN 4-8291-1470-3	October 2002
6	"The Volume of (Being a) Spirit – Part 3 (Bottom)" "Yūrei no Maki – Shita" (ゆうれいの巻·した)	ISBN 4-8291-1507-6	March 2003
7	"Urge Overkill" "Āji Ōvākiru" (アージ·オーヴァーキル)	ISBN 4-8291-1528-9	June 2003
8	"The Volume of Revival – Part 1 (East)" "Fukkatsu no Maki – Higashi" (ふっかつの巻·ひがし)	ISBN 4-8291-1555-6	September 2003
9	"The Volume of Revival – Part 2 (South East)" "Fukkatsu no Maki – Tōnan" (ふっかつの巻·とうなん)	ISBN 4-8291-1575-0	December 2003
10	"The Volume of Revival – Part 3 (South)" "Fukkatsu no Maki – Minami" (ふっかつの巻·みなみ)	ISBN 4-8291-1597-1	March 2004
11	"The Volume of Revival – Part 4 (South West)" "Fukkatsu no Maki – Nansei" (ふっかつの巻·なんせい)	ISBN 4-8291-1623-4	June 2004
12	"The Volume of (having) More Maids" "Motto Meido no Maki" (もっとメイドの巻)	ISBN 4-8291-1650-1	September 2004
13	"The Volume of Revival – Part 5 (West)" "Fukkatsu no Maki – Nishi" (ふっかつの巻·にし)	ISBN 4-8291-1685-4	January 2005
14	"The Volume of Revival – Part 6 (North West)" "Fukkatsu no Maki – Seihoku" (ふっかつの巻·せいほく)	ISBN 4-8291-1697-8	March 2005
15	"The Volume of Revival – Part 7 (North)" "Fukkatsu no Maki – Kita" (ふっかつの巻·きた)	ISBN 4-8291-1755-9	September 2005
16	"Desolation Angels" "Desoreishon Enjerusu" (デソレイション·エンジェルス)	ISBN 4-8291-1727-3	November 2005
17	"The Volume of Revival – Part 8 (North East)" "Fukkatsu no Maki – Hokutō" (ふっかつの巻·ほくとう)	ISBN 4-8291-1808-3	March 2006
18	"The Volume of (having) More and More Maids" "Motto Motto Meido no Maki" (もっともっとメイドの巻)	ISBN 4-8291-1835-0	June 2006
19	"Strange Phenomenon" "Sutorenji - Fenomenon" (ストレンジ・フェノメノン)	ISBN 4-8291-1861-X	October 2006
20	"The Volume of Trouble with Women - 1" "Jonan no Maki - ichi" (じょなんの巻・いち)	ISBN 4-8291-1894-6	January 2007
21	"The Volume of More Maids" "Sarani Meido no Maki" (さらにメイドの巻)	ISBN 4-8291-1912-8	June 2007
22	"The Volume of Trouble with Woman - 2" "Jonan no Maki - ni" (じょなんの巻・に)	ISBN 4-8291-1963-2	September 2007
23	"Rin's Volume" "Kibishi no Maki" (凜の巻)	ISBN 4-8291-3255-8	January 2008
24	"The Volume of Trouble with Women - 3" "Jonan no Maki - san" (じょなんの巻・さん)	ISBN 4-8291-3280-9	April 2008
25	"Another Maid Volume" "Matamata Meido no Maki" (またまたメイドの巻)	ISBN 4-8291-3323-6	October 2008
26	"The Volume of Trouble with Women - 4" "Jonan no Maki - yon" (じょなんの巻・よん)	ISBN 4-8291-3378-3	February 2009
27	"The Volume of Trouble with Women - 5" "Jonan no Maki - go" (じょなんの巻・ご)	ISBN 4-8291-3436-4	August 2009
28	"The Volume of Trouble with Women - 6" "Jonan no Maki - roku" (じょなんの巻・ろく)	ISBN 4-8291-3504-2	March 2010
29	"The Volume of Trouble with Women - 7" "Jonan no Maki - nana" (じょなんの巻・なな)	ISBN 4-8291-3568-9	September 2010
30	"The Volume of Trouble with Women - 8" "Jonan no Maki - hachi" (じょなんの巻・はち)	ISBN 4-8291-3615-4	February 2011
31	"The Volume of Trouble with Women - 9" "Jonan no Maki - kyū" (じょなんの巻・きゅう)	ISBN 4-8291-3836-6	December 2012
32	"The Volume of Trouble with Women - 10" "Jonan no Maki - Jū" (じょなんの巻・じゅう)	ISBN 4-04-070547-7	March 2015

=== Anime ===
In 2003, an anime series was produced by J.C.Staff and was broadcast on the Japanese network, WOWOW. Consisting of 24 episodes, the series first aired on October 14, 2003, with the episode "They Came..." and concluded on April 6, 2004, with the episode "It Was Over...".

On March 8, 2004, ADV Films announced that it had acquired the license to the animated series. The first DVD volume, also available with an artbox, was released on April 19, 2005, and concluded nearly a year later with volume 7. ADV Films later released a Thinpack of the entire series on April 3, 2007.

==== Theme music ====
Opening

1. Magic of Love (恋のマホウ, Koi no Mahō) by Ichiko

Ending

1. We'd Get There Someday by Ichiko (ep. 1–23)
2. We'd Get There Someday by Hitomi Nabatame, Yuki Matsuoka, and Yuka Inokuchi (ep. 24)

== Reception ==
The English language release of Maburaho was met with mediocre reviews. Many critics comment that Maburaho was a typical "by the book" harem comedy that added little originality to the genre. "Maburaho feels like more of an unfinished prototype for the harem genre than an actual anime series", states Anime News Network critic, Carlo Santos. "The plot is there, but it lacks any defining elements besides the general theme of magic; the characters are there, but they don't have any particular traits apart from being, well, the one loser guy and the cookie-cutter hot girls chasing after him." Santos goes on to state. Chris Beveridge, critic for AnimeOnDVD, comments, "Maburaho has some cute quirks to it, very nice character designs and it's a show that actually took a risk midway through the series by changing the nature of the lead character." However Beveridge goes on to say, "While it has these good points, it didn't capitalize on them and instead worked hard towards keeping with a mediocre series of events and scripts. ... It's a by the book piece with some flashes of creativity."

Jason Thompson gave the manga series a half-of-one-star review in his Manga: The Complete Guide, saying "The characters and situations are stock, the girls are identical except for their hair, and the fanservice is tame."
