= Yuna Kagesaki =

Japanese manga artist

- Born: Yuna Kagesaki; March 3, 1973 (age 53)

Yuna Kagesaki (影崎 由那, Kagesaki Yuna) is a manga artist, born on March 3, 1973, best known for being the author of the manga Chibi Vampire. Her work has been published under four different names: Yuna Kagesaki (影崎 由那, Kagesaki Yuna) (professionally published non-pornographic comics, except for Sakura no Ichiban), Yuna Kagezaki (影崎 由那, Kagezaki Yuna) (same characters but different readings; only in Taishō Komachi Jikenchō Sakura no Ichiban!), Yūna Kagesaki (影崎 夕那, Kagesaki Yūna) (spelled with different kanji) when drawing CG's for PC games, and Yuta Kageyama (影山 由多, Kageyama Yuta) when drawing hentai manga or HCG's for PC games.
In the bonus comic strips at the end of volume 3 of her work Hekikai no AiON, she refers to herself as "K-ya (real name)" (Ｋ谷（本名）, Kēya (hommyō)), suggesting that her real name begins with "K" and ends with "ya".

== List of manga work ==
=== as Yuna Kagesaki (影崎 由那) ===
- HA I KA RA (ハ・イ・カ・ラ") (1 volume)
- HAIKARA MONO (HAIKARA·MONO") (1 volume)
- Hekikai no AiON (碧海のAiON) (11 volumes, plus a spinoff volume)
- Higurashi no Naku Koro ni Kokoroiyashi-hen (ひぐらしのなく頃に 心癒し編) (illustrator) (1 volume)
- Ka-non – Karin × Hekikai no AiON – Kagesaki Yuna Tampenshū (ＫＡ−ＮＯＮかりん×碧海のＡｉＯＮ 影崎由那短編集) (1 volume)
- Karin (かりん) (15 volumes, including an extra unnumbered volume)
- Kyōmen no Silhouette (鏡面のシルエット, Kyōmen no Shiruetto) (art only; written by Tamase Nagayama (永山 珠瀬, Nagayama Tamase)) (serialized in Good! Afternoon from 2010 to 2013; 4 volumes)
- Oniichan☆Control (おにいちゃん☆コントロール) (5 volumes)
- Strange Mansion (すとれんじ マンション) (1 volume)
- Tamanyan (たまにゃん) (serialized in Monthly Dragon Age, started July 2013 and ended after 15 chapters)
- Sora x Lila (ソラ×リラ) (serialized in Comic High!, starting 2014) (ended with 9 chapters, 2 volumes)
- Majo no Ie: Ellen no Nikki (魔女の家 エレンの日記) (2 volumes)

=== as Yuna Kagezaki (影崎 由那) ===
- Taishō Komachi Jikenchō Sakura no Ichiban! (大正小町事件帖 櫻の一番！) (5 volumes)

=== as Yūna Kagesaki (影崎 夕那) ===
- Confine (コンファイン) (1 volume)
- TWINS (ツインズ) (1 volume)
- Vampire Neko Musume Sōdō Tan (ヴァンパイア猫娘騒動譚) (1 volume)
- Vicious (ヴィシャス) (1 volume)

=== as Yuta Kageyama (影山 由多) ===
- Accent (アクセント) (1 volume)

== List of games illustrated ==
=== General Audience ===
- D.C.P.S. (Da Capo Plus Situation)
- Infinity
- Never7 - the end of infinity
- Shiritsu Hōō Gakuen "Ichinen Jun'ai-gumi" (私立鳳凰学園「一年純愛組」)
- Super Real Mah-jong Hi Pai Paradise (スーパーリアル麻雀Hi・Paiパラダイス)
- Super Real Mah-jong Hi Pai Paradise 2 Onsen e ikō yo! (温泉へいこうよっ！)

=== Eroge Content ===
- YES! "Yōkan no Vampire" (YES!『洋館のヴァンパイア』)
- BACTA 2
- Pretty Sentai Kyarurūn (ぷりてぃ戦隊きゃるる～ん)
- FILE
- Ce'st·la·vie
- Ippatsu JANG! (イッパツJANG！)
- Kirijima Shinryōshitsu no Gogo (霧島診療室の午後)
- Coming Heart
- Escape! (エスケイプ！)
- HIGH School DAYS (HIGHスクールDAYS)
- Ya Ku So Ku (や・く・そ・く)
- Sotsugyō Shashin (卒業 写真)
- Sotsugyō Shashin 2
- Ayu (あゆ)
- Mio & Miho (みお＆みほ)
- Mayu (まゆ)
- Tenshi no Hina (天使のひな)
- Ko Ko Ro 2 (コ・コ・ロ・・・2)

== List of light novels illustrated by her ==
- Chibi Vampire: The Novel (かりん 増血記, Karin Zōketsuki) (written by Tōru Kai (甲斐 透, Kai Tōru)) (9 volumes)
- Karin Zōketsuki Hajirai Diary (かりん 増血記 恥じらいダイアリー, Karin Zōketsuki Hajirai daiarii) (written by Tōru Kai) (2 volumes)
- Totsugeki Ōjo (突撃王女) (written by Hifumi Suzuki (鈴木 一二三, Suzuki Hifumi)) (1 volumes)
