= Chibi Vampire =

Japanese manga, light novel, and anime television series

- Chibi Vampire manga volume 1 cover

かりん (Karin)
- Genre: Romantic comedy, supernatural
- Manga
- Written by: Yuna Kagesaki
- Published by: Kadokawa Shoten
- English publisher: NA: Tokyopop (print) (expired); Viz Media (digital)
- Magazine: Monthly Dragon Age
- Original run: October 2003 – February 2008
- Volumes: 14
- Light novel

Chibi Vampire: The Novel
- Written by: Tohru Kai
- Illustrated by: Yuna Kagesaki
- Published by: Fujimi Shobo
- English publisher: NA: Tokyopop (expired)
- Magazine: NEO Magazine
- Original run: December 10, 2003 – May 10, 2007
- Volumes: 9
- Anime television series

Karin
- Directed by: Shinichiro Kimura
- Produced by: Makoto Chiba; Masaaki Tanaka; Tomoko Suzuki; Yoshito Danno
- Written by: Yasunori Yamada
- Music by: Masara Nishida
- Studio: J.C.Staff
- Licensed by: NA: Geneon Entertainment
- Original network: WOWOW
- Original run: November 4, 2005 – May 12, 2006
- Episodes: 24

Chibi Vampire, originally released in Japan as Karin (Japanese: かりん), is a Japanese manga series written and illustrated by Yuna Kagesaki. The story is about an unusual vampiress girl, who instead of drinking blood must inject it into others because she produces too much. Chibi Vampire first premiered in the shōnen magazine Monthly Dragon Age in the October 2003 issue, and ran until February 2008. The individual chapters were published by Kadokawa Shoten into fourteen collected volumes. Later an anime series for "Chibi Vampire" was also produced in 2005. This anime series has a somewhat similar but different story and ending.

In 2003, Tohru Kai began writing a series of light novels based on the manga, with Kagesaki providing the illustrations. The nine-volume series was published in Japan by Fujimi Shobo. Both the manga and light novel series were licensed for English language release by Tokyopop. Tokyopop renamed the manga series to Chibi Vampire and the novel series to Chibi Vampire: The Novel.

In 2005, an anime television series adaptation was animated by J.C.Staff and directed by Shinichiro Kimura. Spanning twenty-four episodes, the series aired in Japan on WOWOW from November 4, 2005, through May 12, 2006. It was licensed for an English release to Region 1 DVD, under the original name Karin, by Geneon USA. On July 3, 2008, Geneon Entertainment and Funimation Entertainment announced that Funimation had agreed to be the exclusive North American distributor of Geneon titles, including Karin.

== Plot ==
Karin Maaka lives with a family of vampires who immigrated to Japan two centuries earlier. Unlike the rest of her family, Karin does not feed on blood, she produces it. As a result, she is forced to bite others to expel the extra blood, lest she suffer exaggerated nose-bleeds. She also exhibits no normal vampire traits, and instead lives her life just as an ordinary teenage girl would. She can go outside during the day, attends high school, and follows the sleep pattern of normal humans. However, the general peacefulness of her life is disrupted with the arrival of a new transfer student, Kenta Usui.

Any time she goes near him her blood increases. At first she tries to avoid him but they are in the same class and work in the same restaurant. Kenta begins to think that there is something fishy about Karin and eventually he learns her secret. Karin's older brother Ren tries to erase his memory but Anju, Karin's younger sister, stops him from doing so. She convinces her parents Henry and Calera to make Kenta their ally, because he can help Karin during the daylight. Karin and Kenta become friends, and as they spend more time with one another, fall in love, though they are slow to admit their feelings to one another.

Yuriya Tachibana, a human-vampire hybrid, moves to the area at the request of her vampire uncle, Glark. By chance, Yuriya gets a job at the same restaurant where Karin and Kenta work. As hybrids are sterile, Tachibana disapproves of Karin and Kenta's relationship, feeling any children they had would be unhappy like her. Despite this, Karin likes Tachibana and considers her a friend. On the other hand, Karin's grandmother Elda hates hybrids, as a betrayal danger to vampires. Karin rescues Yuriya from her grandmother. Karin is unaware that Tachibana is actually there to help her uncle and the Brownlick clan spy on her. After another nose bleed leaves Karin comatose for several days, Karin's family ask Kenta to give her some time alone, but the two lovers are unable to stand being apart and eventually reunite and become a couple. Shortly after they share their first kiss, Tachibana helps Glark and Bridget Brownlick kidnap Karin and take her the Brownlick estate. It is revealed that Karin is a "psyche", a blood-giving vampire that can give life to other vampires and heal the sterility currently plaguing all vampires. In doing so, however, vampires have historically been greedy and drain the psyche dry, killing her as a sacrifice. The first psyche, Sophia, reveals herself to Kenta but cannot be seen by anyone else while helping him find Karin.

Karin's father Henry, her brother Ren, and Kenta go to rescue Karin. Meanwhile, Tachibana is horrified to learn that not only will Karin be killed, but also raped until she has a child to produce a new psyche to replace her. She apologizes to Karin for disapproving of Kenta's relationship and for hurting Karin, and helps her escape just as Kenta comes in with Ren. While Ren takes care of the vampire, Bridget, holding Karin captive, Henry battles Glark and the Brownlicks, joined belatedly by his mother Elda. Kenta, Karin, and Tachibana escape, but Tachibana leaves them to go ensure her uncle would not be caught in the sun.

It is later revealed that Karin shared consciousness with Sophia, who gave Karin her condition and helped Kenta rescue Karin. Karin stopped producing excess blood (and being a vampire altogether) after Sophia moved from Karin to Kenta during her last bite. Karin's family sorrowfully erases all of her memories of them, so that she can live as a normal human with Kenta, while they quietly watch over her. They had prepared to do so for over four years, and the process is successful; they cannot erase Kenta's memories however without him reverting to a 4-year old such that he is left having to keep the secret from Karin, who he marries shortly after. At the end of the series, Karin and Kenta have a daughter named Kanon, who is the reborn Sophia; Karin's sister Anju continues to watch over her sister's happiness.

== Media ==
=== Manga ===
Written by Yuna Kagesaki, Chibi Vampire premiered in Japan in the October 2003 issue of Monthly Dragon Age and ran until the February 2008 issue. It was also published in fourteen collected volumes by Kadokawa Shoten, released between October 1, 2003, and April 1, 2008, in Japan. A one-shot side story created by Kagesaki, Karin Side Story: The Vampire of the Western Forest (かりん外伝西の森のヴァンパイア, Karin Gaiden: Nishi no Mori no Vanpaiya), was included in the June 2008 issue of Monthly Dragon Age. It concerns Karin's cousin Friedrich Marker, and concludes with a family tree of the Marker/Maaka family. A second side story is Maki-chan, Helping Angel of Love, concerned with Karin's friend Maki Tokitou. It ends with an epilog, of Maki walking out on her husband for the umpteenth time and coming to Karin's house to help celebrate Karin's birthday. Both side stories were collected into a volume titled Chibi Vampire: Airmail.

In 2005, Tokyopop acquired the license to release both the manga and light novel series in English in North America. To avoid confusion with another of its properties, Tokyopop chose to release the manga under the name Chibi Vampire instead of under its original name of Karin. Tokyopop released the first translated manga volume on April 11, 2006, and the last one on September 29, 2009. They also released the novel series with the manga. Tokyopop also released a collection of Karin short stories under the title Chibi Vampire: Airmail on August 31, 2010. Viz Media later acquired the rights to the series and released a complete digital publication for Kindle. The series has also been released internationally by Pika Édition in France, and by Waneko in Poland.

=== Light novels ===
A series of light novels, Chibi Vampire: The Novel (かりん増血記, Karin Zōketsuki), were written by Tohru Kai with illustrations provided by Kagesaki. The novels were published by Fujimi Shobo, with the first volume released on December 10, 2003. As of April 2008, nine volumes have been released. Tokyopop, which also licensed the manga series, acquired the license to release the novels in English in North America. As the company had renamed the manga series from Karin to Chibi Vampire, it released the novel series under the name Chibi Vampire: The Novel. The first English volume was released on January 9, 2007. In June 2008, Tokyopop restructured itself, breaking into two subsidiaries under a single holding company, and cut its publication releases by more than half. As part of this cut back, Tokyopop canceled the remaining releases of Chibi Vampire: The Novel after the fifth volume, due to be released July 8, 2008. The company later reversed the cancellation and announced that volume six would be released April 13, 2010. In the end volume 8 was published by Tokyopop on March 1, 2011, but volume 9 was not.

Chibi Vampire: The Novel is closely tied to the manga series, with each novel volume designed to be read after its corresponding manga volume. For example, the first novel takes place between the events that occur in the first and second volumes of the manga series, and the fourth volume of the manga mentions characters and events from the first novel volume.

=== Anime ===
In 2005, an anime television series adaptation was animated by J.C.Staff, directed by Shinichiro Kimura, and written by Yasunori Yamada. Spanning twenty-four episodes, the series aired in Japan on WOWOW from November 4, 2005, through May 12, 2006. It was licensed for an English release to Region 1 DVD, under the original name Karin, by Geneon USA; however, the company went out of business before completing the release of the series. On July 3, 2008, Geneon Entertainment and Funimation Entertainment announced an agreement to distribute select titles in North America. While Geneon Entertainment will still retain the license, Funimation Entertainment will assume exclusive rights to the manufacturing, marketing, sales and distribution of select titles. Karin was one of several titles involved in the deal. While Funimation is distributing the DVDs, Geneon is the licensor of the series, and also produced the English dub in association with Odex.

=== Other ===
A book entitled Karin All-Nosebleeds Book (かりん まるごと鼻血ぶ〜っく, Karin Marugoto Hanaji Buukku) (ISBN 978-4-0471-2439-4) was published by Kadokawa Shoten on March 17, 2006, as a guidebook to give an overview of the Chibi Vampire series. The first portion of the book contains illustrations by Yuna Kagesaki; the second part contains an overview of the series' setting, including a map of the town featured in Chibi Vampire; the third part has the results of a reader questionnaire; the fourth part has descriptions of the characters, and outlines of some of the popular scenes throughout the series. This book was published by TokyoPop as Chibi Vampire: Bites on December 28, 2010.

== Reception ==
The English language light novel, and manga adaptations have received generally favorable reviews by various notable critics. Theron Martin from Anime News Network gave the first two manga volumes an overall B+ grade. Martin said that there is a good twist in play on a genre badly in need of one, he also added that the artwork was good, but it was also generic as well as sometimes "cartoonish". Martin also did reviews for the fifth, sixth, tenth, twelfth, thirteenth, and fourteenth volume. Martin referred to Elda as a "juicy" new character in the fifth volume, but said that some of the plot was too generic. He praised the sixth volume for having much drama and important plot info. but was unimpressed by the "true humor", and un-translated sound effects. Martin gave both volumes an overall B rating. In the tenth volume which was also given a B rating, Martin again praised the plot developments but said that the addition of the half-vampire character was "not particularly interesting". Martin gave the twelfth, and thirteenth volumes an overall grade of a B+ saying that there is more "intricate writing" than meets the eye. His criticism about these two volumes were that some of the content is too clichéd. The final volume received a B+ rating from Martin who gave a plus to almost all of the plot resolutions that did not involve Maki. He said that reasons behind Sophia's existence were an issue though along with action scenes that were hard to follow.

Chris Johnston from Newtype USA gave the first manga volume a positive review calling it a "charmingly macabre manga ". Johnston stated that the addition of the vampire plot accentuates the humor, and gives the story more of a purpose than just puppy love. Chris Beveridge from Mania also gave the fourteenth volume a review. Beveridge gave the volume a B rating saying he was glad the series ended on a good note before becoming too uninteresting. He also said that the artwork was spot on, and the franchise as a whole is "good fun".

In 2007, the Chibi Vampire light novel series was a runner up for the Kadokawa Shoten's first annual Light Novel Award in the "Novelization" category.

== See also ==
- Vampire film
- List of vampire television series
