= List of eroge =

This is a list of Japanese erotic video games, also known in Japan as eroge. This list does not include fan created parodies. The market in Japan for this type of game is quite large, and only a small number of the games gain any level of recognition beyond the fans of the genre.

== 0–9 ==
- 5
- 11eyes: Tsumi to Batsu to Aganai no Shōjo
- 21: Two One

== A ==
- After...
- Air
- Aiyoku no Eustia
- Akaneiro ni Somaru Saka
- Akane Maniax
- Akiba Girls
- Alpha
- Angel
- Angels in the Court
- Ayakashi

== B ==
- Baldr Force
- Baldr Sky
- Battle Raper series
  - Battle Raper
  - Battle Raper 2
- Beat Angel Escalayer
- Bible Black
- Bittersweet Fools
- Black Souls series

== C ==
- Cafe Little Wish
- Campus (anime)
- Canary (video game)
- Canvas2
- Cat Girl Alliance (Koneko Doumei)
- Caucasus: Nanatsuki no Nie
- Cherry Petals Fall Like Teardrops
- Clear (video game)
- Clover Heart's
- Cobra Mission: Panic in Cobra City
- Comic Party
- Cosmos no Sora ni
- Criminal Girls: Invite Only
- Cross Channel
- Cross Days

== D ==
- Da Capo
- Da Capo II
- December When There Is No Angel
- Demonbane
- Desire
- The Devil on G-String
- Divi-Dead
- Djibril – The Devil Angel
- Do You Like Horny Bunnies?
- Dohna Dohna
- Dōkyūsei series by ELF
  - Dōkyūsei (Classmates)
  - Dōkyūsei 2
- Dōsei (Cohabitation)
- Dracu-riot!
- Dragon Knight series
  - Dragon Knight
  - Dragon Knight II
  - Dragon Knight III (Knights of Xentar)
  - Dragon Knight 4
- Dramatical Murder

== E ==
- Edelweiss
- Eden*
- Ef: A Fairy Tale of the Two
- Él
- Enzai: Falsely Accused
- Eternal Fantasy
- EVE Burst Error

== F ==
- FairChild
- FairlyLife
- Fate/stay night by Type-Moon
  - Fate/hollow ataraxia
- Flyable Heart
- Fortune Arterial
- The Fruit of Grisaia
- Full Metal Daemon: Muramasa
- Furifuri

== G ==
- Gaku Ou: The Royal Seven Stars
- Gals Panic series
- Gekkō no Carnevale
- Gift
- Girl Next Door
- Go Go Burunyanman
- A Good Librarian Like a Good Shepherd
- Green Green
- The Guts! series

== H ==
- H_{2}O: Footprints in the Sand
- Happiness! (video game)
- Haru no Ashioto
- Harukoi Otome
- Hatsuyuki Sakura
- Heart de Roommate
- Hello, Good-bye
- Honey Select
- HoneyComing
- Hoshiuta
- Hoshizora e Kakaru Hashi
- Hoshizora no Memoria

== I ==
- The Idol Janshi Suchie-Pai series
- If My Heart Had Wings
- Imouto Paradise!
- Imouto Paradise 2
- In Search of the Lost Future
- Iro ni Ide ni Keri Waga Koi wa
- Itaike na Kanojo

== J ==
- Jingai Makyō

== K ==
- Kagetsu Tohya
- Kamikaze Explorer!
- Kana: Little Sister
- Kango Shicyauzo
- Kanojo × Kanojo × Kanojo
- Kanon
- Kara no Shojo
- Kaze no Uta
- Kikokugai
- Kimi ga Nozomu Eien
- Kimi no Nagori wa Shizuka ni Yurete
- Kindred Spirits on the Roof
- Kira Kira
- A Kiss for the Petals
- Kizuato
- Knights of Xentar (Dragon Knight III)
- Koihime Musō
- Kono Aozora ni Yakusoku wo
- Kud Wafter
- Kurenai no Tsuki
- Kusari

== L ==
- Lady Sword
- Lamune
- Lightning Warrior Raidy
- Lightning Warrior Raidy II:~Temple Of Desire~
- Little Busters!
- Lolita Syndrome
- Love, Election and Chocolate

== M ==
- Magic Woman M (Magical Girl Meruru)
- Magical Canan
- Mahjong Sisters
- Maitetsu
- Maji de Watashi ni Koi Shinasai! (Majikoi!)
- Maji Suki: Marginal Skip
- Maple Colors
- Mashiroiro Symphony
- Mizuiro
- Moekan
- Moon
- Moonlight Lady
- Muv-Luv
- My Girlfriend Is the President

== N ==
- Naka no Hito nado Inai! Tokyo Hero Project
- Nanatsuiro Drops
- Nee Pon? × Rai Pon!
- The Nekopara series
- Night Life
- Night Shift Nurses
- Night Slave
- Nightwalker: The Midnight Detective
- No, Thank You!!!
- Nocturnal Illusion
- Nora, Princess, and Stray Cat
- North Wind (video game)
- Nostradamus ni Kiite Miro
- Nursery Rhyme

== O ==
- One: Kagayaku Kisetsu e
- Orange Pocket
- Otome wa Boku ni Koishiteru (Otoboku)

== P ==
- Peace@Pieces
- Phantom of Inferno
- Pipi & Bibi's
- Poibos Part 1
- Popotan
- Princess Holiday
- Princess Lover!
- Prism Heart
  - Prism Ark
- Prism Rhythm
- Puzznic

== R ==
- R.U.R.U.R.
- The Rance series by AliceSoft
- Rapelay
- Really? Really!
- Ren'ai CHU!
- Root After and Another
- Rui wa Tomo o Yobu
- Rumbling Hearts

== S ==
- Saishū Shiken Kujira
- Sakura no Uta
- Sakura Sakura
- Sakura Strasse
- Sanarara
- Saori
- Saya no Uta
- School Days
  - Summer Days
  - Cross Days
  - Shiny Summer Days
- Season of the Sakura
- Sekai to Sekai no Mannaka de
- Sexfriend
- Sharin no Kuni: The Girl Among the Sunflowers
- Shikkoku no Sharnoth: What a Beautiful Tomorrow
- Shizuku
- Shuffle!
- Shuffle! Love Rainbow
- Shukufuku no Campanella
- Slow Damage
- Snow
- Snow Sakura
- Sora no Iro, Mizu no Iro (SoraMizu)
- Sora o Tobu, Mittsu no Hōhō.
- Soul Link
- Stellar Theater
- Steam-Heart's
- Stepmother's Sin
- The Story of Little Monica
- Suika
- _Summer (video game)
- Suzunone Seven!

== T ==
- Tayutama: Kiss on my Deity
- Tears to Tiara
- Tea Society of a Witch
- Tenshin Ranman: Lucky or Unlucky!?
- Tenshitachi no Gogo
- Three Sisters' Story
- Tick! Tack!
- Time Leap
- Togainu no Chi
- To Heart
- To Heart 2
- Tōka Gettan
- Tomoyo After: It's a Wonderful Life
- Tōshin Toshi
  - Tournament of the Gods
- Triangle Heart
- True Love
- Tsuki wa Higashi ni Hi wa Nishi ni: Operation Sanctuary (Hanihani)
- Tsukihime
- Tsuyokiss
- Twinkle Crusaders

== U ==
- Utawarerumono

== V ==
- The Vanilla Series
- Variable Geo
- VR Kanojo

== W ==
- W.L.O. Sekai Renai Kikō
- Wagamama High Spec
- Walkure Romanze
- We Without Wings
- The Welcome to Pia Carrot series
- White Album
- White Album 2
- Wind: A Breath of Heart
- With You: Mitsumeteitai (Windows version only)
- Wonderful Everyday
- Words Worth

== Y ==
- Yami to Bōshi to Hon no Tabibito
- Yorite Konoha wa Kurenai ni
- Yosuga no Sora
- You and Me and Her: A Love Story
- Yume Miru Kusuri: A Drug That Makes You Dream
- YU-NO: A Girl Who Chants Love at the Bound of this World

== Z ==
- Zettai Fukuju Meirei

== See also ==
- Bishōjo game
- List of erotic video games
- List of hentai authors
- List of video games based on anime or manga
- Visual novel
