= Lump of Sugar =

Japanese video game company

Lump of Sugar Ltd.
- Lump of Sugar Logo
- Native name: 有限会社ランプオブシュガー
- Romanized name: Yūgen-gaisha Ranpu obu Shugā
- Type: Joint-stock company
- Industry: Computer games
- Genre: Eroge, Visual novel
- Founded: April 2005
- Headquarters: Japan
- Products: Nursery Rhyme; Itsuka, Todoku, Ano Sora ni; Tayutama: Kiss on my Deity; Tayutama: It's Happy Days; Prism Rhythm; Hello, Good-bye; Diamic Days; Gaku Ou: The Royal Seven Stars; Gaku Ou: It's Heartful Days!!; Hanairo Heptagram; Magical Charming!; Sekai to Sekai no Mannaka de; Nekotsuku, Sakura
- Website: lumpofsugar.co.jp

Lump of Sugar Ltd. (有限会社ランプオブシュガー, Yūgen-gaisha Ranpu obu Shugā) is a Japanese company specializing in adult visual novels. Founded in April 2005, their first game, Nursery Rhyme was released later that year. Their third work, Tayutama: Kiss on my Deity, was released in 2008, and was later adapted into an anime and manga.

== Lump of Sugar Broadcasting ==
Lump of Sugar Broadcasting is an internet radio show which started airing on September 13, 2007. It is sponsored by Russell and Broccoli, hosted by Hina Nakase and Hirorin, and a number of guests have also attended. It is currently ongoing.

=== Guests ===
- Haruka Shimotsuki
- Yui Sakakibara
- Fumitake Moekibara
- Kicco
- Noriko Rikimaru
- Yui Ogura
- Keito Mizukiri
- Kota Oshita
- Riko Korie

== Works ==
=== Independent works ===
- Nursery Rhyme (2005)
- Itsuka, Todoku, Ano Sora ni. (2007)
- Tayutama: Kiss on my Deity (2008)
- Tayutama: It's happy days (2009)
- Prism Rhythm (2010)
- Hello, Good-bye (2010)
- Diamic Days (2011)
- Gaku Ou: The Royal Seven Stars (2012)
- Gaku Ou: It's Heartful Days!! (2012)
- Hanairo Heptagram (2012)
- Magical Charming! (2013)
- Sekai to Sekai no Mannaka de (2014)
- Unmei Senjou no Phi (2014)
- Rensou Relation (2015)
- Kodomo no Asobi (2015)
- Tayutama 2: You're the Only One (2016)
- Tayutama 2: After Stories (2017)
- Yorite Konoha wa Kurenai ni (2018)
- Wakaba-iro no Quartet (2019)
- Nekotsuku, Sakura (2020)
- Madohi Shiroki no Kamikakushi (2021)
- Yumahorome ~Toki o Tometa Yakata de Asu o Sagasu Maigo-tachi~ (2022)
- Arcana Alchemia (2022)
- Haruka Ao no Hanayome ni (2023)

=== Cooperated Works ===
- Animal☆Panic (2019)
- Rurizakura (2023)
- Kira☆Kano (2024)
