= Sekai to Sekai no Mannaka de =

2014 video game

- Cover art, featuring (clockwise from the bottom left): Haruka, Minori, Kokoro, and Aira.
- Developer: Lump of Sugar
- Publisher: Lump of Sugar
- Platform: Windows
- Release: JP: January 31, 2014
- Genres: Eroge, Visual novel, Bishōjo Game
- Mode: Single-player

Sekai to Sekai no Mannaka de (世界と世界の真ん中で), subtitled Celestial Globe of Your Heart, and sometimes abbreviated as Sekachu (セカチュー), is a Japanese adult visual novel developed by Lump of Sugar and released on January 31, 2014 for Windows PCs. The story of Sekachu begins with Renri Ōmi's younger sister Kokoro being discharged from the hospital. When he and his friends are cleaning out the Erdõs dormitory, they find various clues that guide them to a mysterious object.

The gameplay in Sekachu follows a branching plot line which offers pre-determined scenarios with courses of interaction, and focuses on the appeal of the female main characters by the player character. The game was a commercial success at the time of its release; however, sales declined later on that year.

== Gameplay ==
Average dialogue and narrative in Sekachu depicting the player character Renri Ōmi talking to (from left to right): Ataru Nishō, Minori Tsukidate, Kokoro Ōmi, Haruka Akane, and Aira Shiratori.

Sekachu is a romance visual novel in which the player assumes the role of Renri Ōmi. Much of its gameplay is spent reading the text that appears on the screen, which represents the story's narrative and dialogue. The text is accompanied by character sprites, which represent who Renri is talking to, over background art. Throughout the game, the player encounters CG artwork at certain points in the story, which take the place of the background art and character sprites.

There are four main plot lines (and a bonus route) that the player will have the chance to experience, one for each of the heroines in the story. Throughout gameplay, the player is given multiple options to choose from, and text progression pauses at these points until a choice is made. Some decisions can lead the game to end prematurely and offer an alternative ending to the plot. To view all plot lines in their entirety, the player will have to replay the game multiple times and choose different choices to further the plot in an alternate direction. There are scenes depicting Renri and a given heroine having sex.

== Plot ==
=== Setting ===
Most of Sekachu's story takes place during spring break in the fictional Kaginomori Academy (鍵ノ森学舎, Kaginomori Gakusha), which is famous for its math and science courses. This prestigious academy also has a total of eighty-eight dormitories. A few students, who attend Kaginomori, are residents of the Erdõs (エルデシュ, Erudeshu) dormitory. The game, set in the countryside, combines harem and fantasy elements together.

=== Story and characters ===
Kokoro Ōmi (近江 小々路, Ōmi Kokoro; voiced by Aine Sakura), the main heroine of Sekachu, is being discharged from the hospital. She is a sweet girl who is loved by everyone, and despite her weak constitution, has a bright and lively personality. Kokoro is to join her older brother Renri Ōmi (近江 連理, Ōmi Renri), the player character, at Kaginomori Academy, and board the Erdõs dormitory. Renri is serious, but caring, and his nagging has earned him the nickname "okā-san". He and his friends decide to clean out Erdõs, for Kokoro, and while cleaning out the attic, they discover mysterious keys and incantation-like words, which are clues guiding them to a secret room housing a gigantic object. This is referred to as the "Celestial Globe" by the main characters.

Another heroine includes Minori Tsukidate (月舘 美紀, Tsukidate Minori; voiced by Iroha Haruno), a beautiful and intelligent girl, appearing to be very ladylike. However, she is fun-loving outside of school. Renri makes other friends during his stay in Kaginomori, such as Aira Shiratori (白取 愛良, Shiratori Aira; voiced by Haruru Aikaze), an extremely quiet girl who only seems to talk to him. Much of the time, Aira does not change her facial expression. Renri's senpai, Haruka Akane (朱音 遥, Akane Haruka; voiced by Ui), is a genius with dreadful sleeping habits and tends to speak slowly. She has a pair of dog ears and a tail.

== Development ==
The production and planning of Sekachu began right after Hanairo Heptagram, another work by Lump of Sugar. The game was originally going to be called Tobira no Mukō no Sphere (扉の向こうのスフィア), but in mid-development, Celery and Tetsujin wanted to change the title, and searched in bookstores for inspiration. Later on, Tetsujin proposed the idea of Sekai to Sekai no Mannaka de, for a title.

Celery directed the game, and wrote the scenario; Tetsujin and Tamaki Ichikawa also contributed to the writing. The character designer was Fumitake Moekibara, who has drawn many character designs in previous Lump of Sugar games, such as Nursery Rhyme, Itsuka, Todoku, Ano Sora ni, and Tayutama: Kiss on my Deity. The game's music was composed entirely by Shigenobu Ōkawa.

=== Release history ===
The game's official website opened on August 21, 2013. This site would update information pertaining to the self-described "heart eloping ADV" (ココロ道行きADV, Kokoro Michiyuki ADV), Sekachu. Before any copies of the game were released, there were two free trial downloads. The first of these was made available on November 8, 2013, and the second on December 30, 2013. Both of these versions included adult content. The game was postponed for a month before being released as a limited edition DVD-ROM for Windows PCs on January 31, 2014. A full version of the game was put up for download on the official website - this time, not for free - on October 2, 2015.

== Related media ==
=== Books and publications ===
If pre-ordered, then the limited edition of Sekachu packaging would include a reservation-only booklet, titled Sekachu Confidential Official Book. A 127-page visual fan book was released by Kadokawa Shoten on June 27, 2014. Before the game's release, Sekachu received a fair amount of publicity in bishōjo magazines such as Tech Gian, Dengeki Hime, BugBug, Push!!, and Pasocom Paradise.

=== Music and audio CDs ===
Sekachu has three theme songs: "Hoshi no Yō ni Naritai" (星のようになりたい; "I Want to Be Like a Star"), the first opening theme, and "Recollections", the ending theme, were sung by Kicco. Aira's voice actress, Haruru Aikaze, performed "Sing a Song", the only insert song in the game. A maxi single came bundled with the limited edition's release, containing the three songs and their instrumental versions. The background music of Sekachu was released in an original soundtrack on January 31, 2014, along with the limited edition's release.

== Reception ==
Sekachu ranked first in terms of national sales of PC games in Japan in February 2014. Also, Sekachu was No. 1 in the January 2014 sales ranking on Getchu.com, a major redistributor of visual novel and domestic anime products. The sales of Sekachu quickly decreased, only ranking at No. 24 the following month on the website. As for the whole year, the game was ranked at No. 18. Sekachu is part of Bushiroad's Chaos TCG trading card game series, and has been released as a booster pack.
