= Nursery Rhyme (video game) =

Japanese visual novel

- Original visual novel cover of Nursery Rhyme

ナーサリィ☆ライム (Nāsaryi Raimu)
- Genre: Drama, Fantasy, Romance
- Video game
- Developer: Lump of Sugar
- Publisher: Lump of Sugar (Windows); Moepli (FOMA)
- Genre: Eroge, visual novel
- Platform: Windows, FOMA
- Released: JP: November 25, 2005
- Light novel

Nursery Rhyme 1. Watakushi no Ōji-sama
- Written by: Sasa Miyachiruda
- Illustrated by: Fumitake Moekibara (cover art); Maru-chan
- Published by: Softgarage
- Imprint: Sofgare Novels
- Published: September 25, 2006

Nursery Rhyme (ナーサリィ☆ライム, Nāsaryi Raimu) is a Japanese eroge visual novel developed by Lump of Sugar and released on November 25, 2005 for Windows. The story follows the life of Shizuma Hasekura, who visits his childhood friend Makina Tomoe and her twin sister, Yukina Tomoe. Nursery Rhyme is set in future, and takes place in the same world of Tayutama: Kiss on my Deity.

The gameplay in Nursery Rhyme follows a branching plot line which offers pre-determined scenarios with courses of interaction, and focuses on the appeal of the five female main characters by the player character. The game ranked at No. 2 in the national top 50 for best-selling PC games sold in Japan. Nursery Rhyme has made transitions into other media, such as a light novel and audio dramas.

== Gameplay ==
Example of what average dialogue and narrative looks like in Nursery Rhyme. From left to right: Tita, Makina, Krile (and Azrael), Yuria, Rin and Yukina.

Nursery Rhyme is a romance visual novel in which the player assumes the role of Shizuma Hasekura. Much of its gameplay is spent reading the text that appears on the screen, which represents the story's narrative and dialogue. The text is accompanied by character sprites, which represent who Shizuma is talking to, over background art. Throughout the game, the player encounters CG artwork at certain points in the story, which take the place of the background art and character sprites. Nursery Rhyme follows a branching plot line with multiple endings, and depending on the decisions that the player makes during the game, the plot will progress in a specific direction.

There are five main plot lines that the player will have the chance to experience, one for each of the heroines in the story. Throughout gameplay, the player is given multiple options to choose from, and text progression pauses at these points until a choice is made. Some decisions can lead the game to end prematurely and offer an alternative ending to the plot. To view all plot lines in their entirety, the player will have to replay the game multiple times and choose different choices to further the plot to an alternate direction. Throughout gameplay, there are scenes depicting Shizuma and a given heroine having sex.

== Plot ==
=== Setting ===
The game, taking place 500 years after the events of Tayutama: Kiss on my Deity, is set in a fictional Japan where the existence of magic has been recognized by society, and thus has been the subject of much research. Magic is also applied to everyday life; for example, stuffed toys are able to talk. Users of magic must wear a special ring which controls their powers, and are urged to blend in with society. Despite Nursery Rhyme being set in the future, Japan's culture is depicted as unchanged for the most part. Many of the characters attend Shōsei Gakuen (将星学園), a prestigious all-girls school which provides its students with magic classes, as well as academic courses. Shōsei Gakuen hosts a female-dominated sport event known as Sophilos (ソフィロス).

=== Main characters ===
The player assumes the role of Shizuma Hasekura (支倉 静真, Hasekura Shizuma), a sensible teenager who, while his parents are working overseas, is visiting his energetic childhood friend Makina Tomoe (巴 真紀奈, Tomoe Makina; voiced by Mahiru Kaneda). She is talented at sports such as Sophilos, although her grades are suffering. Makina has an older twin sister called Yukina Tomoe (巴 有希奈, Tomoe Yukina; voiced by Yuki Matsunaga), who is more mature than Makina. She enjoys gardening, and is skilled at cooking.

Shizuma meets spoiled rich girl Tita Flawless Brandt (ティータ・フローレス・ブラント, Tīta Furōresu Buranto; voiced by Kana Yoshikawa). She is a tsundere, and is in constant competition with the twins. The last two heroines are Krile Shikishima (敷島・クルル, Shikishima Kururu; voiced by Komugi Nishida), a genius with dog-like ears and a tail, and Rin Lim Venus (凛・リム＝ウェムス, Rin Rimu Vīnasu; voiced by Risa Matsuda), a shy and clumsy elf who is aiming to become a teacher.

== Development and release ==
Nursery Rhyme is the first title developed by Lump of Sugar. The visual novel's scenario was written by Seimei Shibusawa, Daisangen, Eiji Takashima and Fuminori Aki. The character designs and illustrations for the visual novel were drawn by Fumitake Moekibara. The game's music was composed and arranged by a.k.a.dRESS (ave;new). The opening movie was animated by Radiant Impression Prelude.

Self-described as a "pure love heartful adventure game" (ピュアラブは～とふる アドベンチャーゲーム, Pyua Rabu Hātofuru Adobenchā Gēmu), Nursery Rhyme was released on November 25, 2005 as a DVD-ROM for Windows PCs. A version playable on FOMA mobile phones was released by Moepli on September 8, 2006. A desk accessory package called Itsusora & Nursery Rhyme Desktop Accessory "Sugar Pot!" (いつ空＆ナーサリィ ライムデスクトップアクセサリー「しゅが☆ぽ！」) was released on August 17, 2007.

== Adaptations ==
=== Printed media ===
The cover to Nursery Rhyme 1. Watakushi no Ōji-sama.

A 111-page book titled Nursery Rhyme Visual Guide Book was published by Jive on April 24, 2006. The book included content such as computer graphics, story and character explanations, and rough sketches. A 234-page light novel titled Nursery Rhyme 1. Watakushi no Ōji-sama (NURSERY☆RHYME 1.わたくしのおうじさま), written by Sasa Miyachiruda and published by Softgarage, was released on September 25, 2006 under the Sofgare Novels imprint. The cover art was drawn by Fumitake Moekibara, and the internal illustrations were drawn by Maru-chan.

=== Music and audio CDs ===
Nursery Rhyme features music by Saori Sakura, who performs the opening theme, "true my heart", and ending theme, "Dearness". The original soundtrack was released with the visual novel as a reservation bonus, titled Nursery Rhyme Memories original sound track. A maxi single by Saori Sakura was released on September 3, 2007 containing remixes of the opening theme and another song called "kiss my lips". A character song single was released on December 29, 2007 at Comic Market 73.

A drama CD was released with the visual novel as a reservation bonus. The first track focuses on the twins Makina and Yukina; the second track focuses on Tita and Rin; the third and final track focuses on Krile and her pet, Azrael. A second drama CD, titled Nursery Rhyme Drama CD "Life is sweet", was released by Rio on June 30, 2006.

== Reception and legacy ==
According to a national ranking of how well bishōjo games sold nationally in Japan, Nursery Rhyme was the No. 2 best-selling bishōjo game at the time of its release. Tomoyo After: It's a Wonderful Life, released on the same day, took the No. 1 spot. Nursery Rhyme was the 18th most widely sold game of 2005 on Getchu.com.

The opening theme, "true my heart", has become an internet meme. This is due to the misheard lyric "kishimen" (きしめん), which spawned a series of remix parodies on Nico Nico Douga. "true my heart"'s melody has also appeared in the Kumikyoku Nico Nico Douga videos, as has "kiss my lips". Some of the Nursery Rhyme characters feature in Megami Engage!.
