= Mai Goto =

Japanese voice actress

- 後藤 麻衣
- Born: August 22, 1982 (age 44); Obihiro, Hokkaido, Japan
- Occupation: Voice actress
- Years active: 2003–present
- Agent: Ken Production

Mai Goto (後藤 麻衣, Gotō Mai; born August 22, 1982) is a Japanese voice actress.

== Filmography ==
=== Anime ===
- 11eyes – Yuka Minase
- Angel's Drop – Shinobu
- Blessing of the Campanella – Ritos Tortilla
- Brighter than the Dawning Blue – Mai Asagiri
- Buddy Complex – Tsubasa Watase
- Cardfight!! Vanguard – De Toilette
- Circlet Princess – Nina Avelin
- ef: a tale of memories – Mizuki Hayama
- Fullmetal Alchemist: Brotherhood – May Chang
- Haganai – Female Student
- Hakken Taiken Daisuki! Shimajirō – Yatsu
- Haruka Nogizaka's Secret – Mika Nogizaka
- Happiness! – Sumomo Kohinata
- Kemeko Deluxe! – Tamako Kobayashi
- K-ON! – Student
- Ladies versus Butlers! – Pina Suforumukuran Estoh
- Mashiroiro Symphony – Sakuno Uryū
- Nanatsuiro Drops – Yuki
- Phi-Brain - Puzzle of God – Airi Mizutani
- Pupipō! Reiko Azuma
- The Qwaser of Stigmata – Astarte
- Rin-ne – Yukina
- Shakugan no Shana S – Yukino Ozaki
- Shin Koihime Musō – Ryūbi Gentoku AKA Tōka
- Shin Koihime Musō: Otome Tairan – Ryūbi Gentoku AKA Tōka
- Wagamama High Spec – Toa Narumi
- You're Under Arrest: Full Throttle – Female Police Officer
- Zatch Bell! – Child

=== Video games ===
- 11eyes Crossover – Yuka Minase
- Ar tonelico Qoga: Knell of Ar Ciel – Saki
- Blaze Union: Story to Reach the Future – Elena
- Dengeki Gakuen RPG: Cross of Venus – Mika Nogizaka
- ef - a fairy tale of the two. – Mizuki Hayama
- Generation of Chaos: Pandora’s Reflection – Dominic
- Happiness! Deluxe – Sumomo Kohinata
- Nanatsuiro★Drops Pure!! – Yuki-chan, Autumn Princess Karin
- Haruka Nogizaka's Secret: Cosplay, Hajimemashita♥ – Mika Nogizaka
- Haruka Nogizaka's Secret: Dōjinshi Hajimemashita♥ – Mika Nogizaka
- Mashiro Iro Symphony: *mutsu no hana – Sakuno Uryū
- Narcissu ~Moshimo Ashita ga Aru Nara~ – Chisato Kusunoki
- Riddle Joker – Mayu Shikibe
- Shukufuku no Campanella Portable – Ritos Tortilla
- Suiheisen made Nan Mile? - Deep Blue Sky & Pure White Wings - (Mariya Hanami)
- Tenshin Ranman: Happy Go Lucky!! – Sana Chitose
- Time Leap – Komomo Shinonome
- Twinkle ☆ Crusaders Go Go – Pakki
- Yoake Mae yori Ruri Iro na -Brighter than dawning blue- – Mai Asagiri
- Yoake Mae yori Ruri Iro na Portable – Mai Asagiri
- YOU and ME and HER: A love story – Aoi Mukou
