= Gaku Ou: The Royal Seven Stars =

Japanese visual novel

- Original visual novel cover

学☆王 -THE ROYAL SEVEN STARS-
- Genre: Action, Fantasy
- Video game
- Developer: Lump of Sugar
- Publisher: Lump of Sugar
- Genre: Visual novel, eroge
- Platform: Microsoft Windows, PlayStation Portable
- Released: January 27, 2012 (Windows); March 28, 2013 (PSP)
- Manga
- Published by: Media Factory
- Magazine: Monthly Comic Alive
- Original run: January 2012 – May 26, 2012
- Volumes: 2

Gaku Ou: The Royal Seven Stars (学☆王 -THE ROYAL SEVEN STARS-; lit. "School King") is a Japanese adult visual novel developed and published by Lump of Sugar. The game first released on January 27, 2012, it was then later ported to PlayStation Portable, entitled Gaku Ou: The Royal Seven Stars + Meteor (学☆王 -THE ROYAL SEVEN STARS- ＋METEOR), and released on March 28, 2013, by Alchemist. The PSP version removes the explicit scenes and loses the rating 15 or older, but adds a new opening and the new main female character named Sorano. Lump of Sugar later went on to produce a fan disc called Gaku Ou -It's Heartful Days!!- (学☆王 -It’s Heartful Days!!-) released on Comiket 82 in 2012. The fan disc is set after the events of the main game. A manga adaptation, titled Gaku ☆ Ou -twinkle star story- (学☆王〜the twinkle star story〜) began serialization in Monthly Comic Alive by Media Factory.

== Gameplay ==
A screenshot from the game, depicting the protagonist, Hiroto, making conversation with one of the heroines, Akari.

Alike a typical visual novel game, the amount of gameplay is extremely minimal. The game gives the player a well-rounded perspective of the characters through the use of dialogue boxes that narrate the character's voice as well as their thoughts and emotions. As the game progresses, the player will reach a point where the players will choose an alternate direction between routes. The PC version contains adult material scenes, depicting the protagonist having sex with the various heroines.

In the PSP port, it removes any scenes that involve sexual interaction between characters, it also contains additional scenarios and adds a new main female character, Sorano, the protagonist's younger sister.

== Plot ==
=== Story ===
Hiroto is a prince from the Kingdom of Eleutheria on the small far-away planet of Fadenfrus. He was tired of spending his days in the royal palace and yearned for a school life like those on Earth, where his mother had once attended. His wish came true when he was allowed to attend Konoegahara Gakuen in Junesis, a country well known for its superior education system. However, the school only had 7 students (including himself) and was on the brink of closure since it was being targeted by officials. He decided to oppose the country to save the school and protect the school life that he had longed for... but moreover, the ulterior motive for him being sent to Earth was to take over Junesis!

PSP cover art, featuring new heroine, Sorano.

=== Playable characters ===
Hiroto
Hiroto is the male protagonist of the game.

Sorano
Sorano is the female protagonist of the game. She is Hiroto's younger sister. This character is only playable on the PSP version of the game.

=== Seven Stars ===
Akari Konoe (近衛 光莉, Konoe Akari)

- Voiced by: Yuka Kotorii (PC), Natsumi Takamori (PSP)

Akari is the first heroine met by Hiroto, she is the school director's granddaughter.

Annemarie Lohenstein (アンネマリー・ローエンシュタイン, Annemarī Rōenshutain)

- Voiced by: Usa Fujisaki (PC), Chiyo Ousaki (PSP)

Annemarie is a cute girl who is an exchange student from Switzerland. She enjoys baking.

Hinayu Mayuzumi (黛 比奈夕, Mayuzumi Hinayu)

- Voiced by: Rokka Kitami (PC), Ryoko Ono (PSP)

Hinayu is one of the teachers teaching at Konoegahara Gakuen, she is quite shy at times. Despite her small stature, she is a senior classmate.

Uzuki Aquarius Tenguuji (天宮寺・アクアリウス・海月, Tenguuji Akuariusu Uzuki)

- Voiced by: Yuri Bara (PC), Misato Fukuen (PSP)

Uzuki is a high spirited, energetic girl who excels in sports. She likes to tease Akari.

Erkenbert Lohenstein (エルケンバート・ローエンシュタイン, Erukenbāto Rōenshutain)

- Voiced by: Ryōta Ōsaka (PC, PSP)

Erkenbert is Annemarie's older brother, he is an otaku.

Shou Onihara (穂仁原 翔, Onihara Shō)

- Voiced by: Kōta Ōshita (PC, PSP)

Shou's nickname is Harashou, he likes music.

== Related media ==
=== Printed media ===
In 2012, a manga called Gaku Ou: The Twinkle Star Story was serialized in Comic Alive by Media Factory, which was authored by Lump of Sugar. Tatetsu Teto provides the illustrations. A visual fan book for Gaku Ou: The Royal Seven Stars was officially released on June 15, 2012, published by Enterbrain. The visual book contains material suitable for audiences over 18, and is precisely 144 pages long.

=== Music ===
All the songs, including in the PSP version, were composed by a.k.a.dRESS of Ave;new. Both the opening and ending songs were performed by Saori Sakura, titled "My Sweet Lady" and "Fluorite Diary", respectively. In the PSP game, the opening song "My Little Glory" was also sung by Saori Sakura.
