= Ringo Aoba =

Japanese voice actress

- 青葉 りんご
- Born: Kagoshima Prefecture, Japan
- Occupation: voice actress

Ringo Aoba (青葉 りんご, Aoba Ringo) is a Japanese voice actress from Kagoshima Prefecture.

== Career ==
Aoba worked with Rock 'n' Banana until July 1, 2013.

== Video game voice work ==
=== 2011 ===
- Euphoria – Nemu Manaka

=== 2013 ===
- Gensou no Idea: Oratorio Phantasm Historia – Kanzaki Noel
- Hapymaher – Hirasaka Keiko [84]
- Nanay happy Princess – Hibiki wood Otowa
- Baldo sky zero – Murrell
- Brides love – Cherry Yuki Mori Misaki
- Naimononedari are you sister – Ayaka 七々原
- The sunny nostalgia CA – Bird Yu Kei
- Love in bloom, a promise of love ~ Annaffiare ~ – Mind the hangjin road
- Us «and» to starry sky «sky» is round – Nirehara cheer sounds
- Vlaomote of my girlfriend-Pure Sweet Heart ~ – 鳴ヶ崎 Kanna
- By Akuma oshioki!! round Kido Thad expression hentai punishment Department – Corona
- Three pole Princess 3-World newborn- – Scripture Wei, Kanu
- Against polar Princess 5-genealogy of the King cut off the ravages of war- – Uesugi Kenshin, Honda tadakatsu, Tachibana dōsetsu

== Filmography ==
- Harukazedori ni Tomarigi o (2007) – Kanome Urashima
- Shin Koihime Musō (2007) – Batai (Tanpopo)
- Chōkō Sennin Haruka (2008) – Narika Shihōdō
- Love Selection (2008) – Yayoi
- Sakura Strasse (2008) – Christof Clement
- Sengoku Hime (2008) – Tachibana Dousetsu
- Honō no Haramase Dōkyūsei (2008-2009) – Mai Ebihara, Nanoha Homura
- Flyable Heart (2009) – Megumi Hayakawa
- Hana to Otome ni Shukufuku o (2009) – Mayako Yamamoto
- Imouto Smile (2009) – Natsuki Namisawa
- Sakura Tale (2009) – Lydie de Le Fehver
- Ama Ane (2010) – Yuzuki Yashima
- Deardrops (2010) – Sakurai Kanade
- Princess Knight Catue (2010) - Catue Dragundaala [Hentai]
- Fault!! (2010) – Mio Sugiyama
- Hoshizora e Kakaru Hashi (2010) – Ibuki Hinata
- Jinki Extend Re:vision (2010) – Satsuki Kawamoto
- Kono Uta ga Owattara: When This Song Is Over (2010) – Mizuku Fujiwara
- Noble Works (2010) – Maya Nagamitsu
- Love Death 555! (2010) – Ichigo Takagaki
- Euphoria (2011) – Nemu Manaka
- fortissimo EXA//Akkord:Bsusvier (2011) – Sayuki Kurobane
- Bishoujo Mangekyo: Norowareshi Densetsu no Shojo (2011) – Kirie Kagarino
- Dracu-riot! (2012) – Sayo Aragami
- fortissimo EXS//Akkord:nächsten Phase (2012) – Sayuki Kurobane
- Love La Bride (2013) – Sakuranomori Misaki
