= Prism Rhythm =

Japanese visual novel

- Visual novel cover of Prism Rhythm

プリズムリズム (Purizumurizumu)
- Genre: Harem, Romance
- Video game
- Developer: Lump of Sugar
- Publisher: Lump of Sugar
- Genre: Eroge, Visual novel
- Platform: Windows, PlayStation Portable
- Released: JP: May 28, 2010 (Windows)
- Manga

Lump of Comic: Prism Rhythm
- Written by: Lump of Sugar
- Illustrated by: Fumitake Moekibara
- Published by: Enterbrain
- Novel

Prism Rhythm Novel
- Written by: Ricotta
- Published by: Paradigm
- Published: August 31, 2010

Prism Rhythm (プリズムリズム, Purizumurizumu) is a Japanese visual novel, the fourth installment developed and published by Lump of Sugar. The trial edition was released on April 2, 2010, and the limited edition was released on May 28, 2010. The characters featured in Prism Rhythm were designed by Natuki Tanihara and Yau Sesena. A four-panel manga titled Lamp of Comic: Prism Rhythm has been published, and a novel of Prism Rhythm was written by Ricotta and then publicized on August 31, 2010.

== Characters ==
Kazuki Tokitou (土岐遠 一騎, Tokitō Kazuki)
Kazuki is the player character of Prism Rhythm. He is inspired to enroll in a reputable school after seeing Caroline Marigold's amazing dance skills.

Elsterrier Marigold (エルステリア・マリーゴールド, Erusuteria Marīgōrudo)
Voiced by: Ai Shimizu
Elsterrier is Caroline's younger sister and a classmate of Kazuki's in St.Beltina Academy. She is an unusually hard worker and is quite clever.

Kasumi Tokitou (土岐遠 カスミ, Tokitō Kasumi)
Voiced by: Yu Asakawa
Kasumi is Kazuki's busty cousin, she is an upperclassman.

Lia Berlioz (リア・ベルリオーズ, Ria Beruriōzu)
Voiced by: Yukina Fujimori
Ria is another classmate of Kazuki who works in the library named Azrael. She likes to spread and create rumors.

Gin Mizune (水音 銀, Mizune Gin)
Voiced by: Hina Nakase
Gin is a girl with a very small stature who enjoys eating food a great deal. Her real name is Christine McWorter (クリスティン・マックウォーター).

Caroline Marigold (キャロライン・マリーゴールド, Kyarorain Marīgōrudo)
Voiced by: Mikage Haida
Elsterrier's older sister.

Stitch
A green-haired maid.

Babii
An owl-like creature with a ponytail.

Kyouji Asakwa
A guy with red hair.

Yunaha Christie
A purple-haired girl.

== Media ==
=== Printed media ===
On August 31, 2010, a novel based on Prism Rhythm was published by Paradigm. The story was written by RICOTTA.

A four-panel comic strip manga of Prism Rhythm called Lamp of Comic: Prism Rhythm has been published, with a total of five pages. Each page focuses on the protagonist Kazuki interacting with a different heroine, Elsterrier, Kasumi, Lia, Gin and Caroline.

=== Audio CDs ===
The opening theme to Prism Rhythm is 'Pure My Voices' sung by Ave; new. The ending song to Elsterrier's route is 'Prism' sung by Matsutade Mio, Lia's ending song is 'Present' sung by Fujimori Yukina, Kasumi's ending song is 'Dreams' sung by Urakasumi Shino, and Gin's ending song is 'Smile' sung by Nakasehina. Haida Mikage provides the vocals for Caroline's ending theme, 'Spring Snow'. Two discs for Prism Rhythm's original soundtrack have been produced.

Disc 1
No.	Title	Length
1.	"Prism Rhythm"	3:02
2.	"The Gentle Flow of Morning"	4:20
3.	"The Blue Connected to the Beach"	4:13
4.	"Scenery in the Town with the Waterway"	4:58
5.	"The Bustling Rhythm of the Water"	4:28
6.	"The Moonlight Reflected in the Water"	4:06
7.	"Melody of Our Good Fortune"	4:54
8.	"With a Heart as Clear as the Water"	4:27
9.	"The Moment Our Hearts Overlapped"	4:19
10.	"You Will Be Near Me"	4:57
11.	"The Sound of Wave Echoing in the Evening"	4:10
12.	"A Drop of Anxiety and Wonderment"	4:48
13.	"Prism of Water and Wood"	3:40
14.	"A Fairy that Inhabits My Memories"	4:23
15.	"Festival of Gratitude to the Great Tree"	5:00
16.	"The Dance of Lovely Bertina"	4:16
17.	"The Melody of Oze and the Forest"	4:11
18.	"The Future of Each Young Lady"	4:20
Total length:		78:32

Disc 2
No.	Title	Length
1.	"At My Own Carefree Pace"	4:39
2.	"The Ship Rocking on the Water"	5:32
3.	"A Moment Wrapped in Happiness"	5:16
4.	"Tears of Gentle Delight"	6:15
5.	"The Challenge is the Continual Tension"	4:52
6.	"Haruki's Interweaving Scenery"	5:32
7.	"Those People Who Support Our Institution"	5:20
8.	"Prism"	5:40
9.	"Present"	5:40
10.	"Dreams"	6:23
11.	"Smile"	5:16
12.	"Spring snow"	4:41
13.	"A Bouquet for Minstrel Gin"	1:35
14.	"The Future of Each Young Lady ~Long ver~"	3:15
Total length:		69:56

== Reception ==
On Getchu, Prism Rhythm was ranked first with the highest sales in May, 2010. Then in the following month June, Prism Rhythm's ranking dropped to 26th place. Prism Rhythm came 8th in the sales ranking of the year 2010, whilst Hello, Good-bye came 6th. On PCpress, Prism Rhythm came 5th in the reservation ranking log of April, 2010.
