= Yuki Matsunaga =

Japanese voice actress

- 松永 雪希
- Born: February 3 Japan
- Occupation: Voice actress
- Years active: 2002?–2011

Yuki Matsunaga (松永 雪希, Matsunaga Yuki, born February 3) is a Japanese voice actress primarily for visual novels.

== Voice roles ==
- Otome wa Boku ni Koishiteru as Yukari Kamioka
- Shuffle!, Tick Tack!, and Really? Really! as Nerine
- Haru no Ashioto
- School Days as Otome Katō
- Sakura Bitmap as Hiyama Riko
- Tayutama: Kiss on my Deity as Kikuramikami no Hime
