= Dracu-riot! =

2012 video game

Dracu-Riot!
- Developer: Yuzu Soft
- Publisher: Yuzu Soft
- Artists: Kobuichi; Muririn
- Platform: Windows
- Release: March 30, 2012
- Genres: Visual novel, eroge
- Mode: Single player

Dracu-riot! (ドラクリオット!, Dorakuriotto!) is an adult visual novel released by Yuzusoft on March 30, 2012. It is the 6th visual novel from Yuzusoft, immediately following Noble Works and Tenshin Ranman. It has three manga adaptations.

The game was originally announced for a release by Sekai Project in 2017, but it was later taken over by NekoNyan. It has since been released in English and Chinese by NekoNyan.

== Plot ==
The story takes place on the man-made floating island of Aqua Eden, where gambling and prostitution are considered legal by the government.

One summer day, Yūuto Mutsura and Naota Kurahashi travel to the artificial island. During their visit, they meet a girl named Miu, who directs them to a brothel for Naota to fulfil his goal of losing his virginity. Soon after, Miu gets kidnapped, is taken to a warehouse and is held for ransom. Yuuto then goes to rescue her, where he too is taken hostage. The kidnappers are arrested by an island security task force. During a subsequent misunderstanding, Yuuto is turned into a vampire, learns that Aqua Eden is really a safe haven for vampires and that Miu is a vampire herself.

== Characters ==
=== Main characters ===
- Yūto Mutsura (六連 佑斗, Mutsura Yūto)—The protagonist. He goes to Aqua Eden with his friend hoping to find good food. He gets turned into a vampire while there.
- Miu Yarai (矢来 美羽, Yarai Miu) (Voiced by: Kōri Natsuno)—A telekinetic veteran vampire who sides with a security task force on Aqua Eden. She considers herself responsible for turning Yuuto into a vampire.
- Azusa Mera (布良 梓, Mera Azusa) (Voiced by: Shizuku Satō)—A human girl who does not like being treated like a child. She is the dorm leader.
- Rio Inamura (稲叢 莉音, Inamura Rio) (Voiced by: Hinata Ayukawa)—A gentle vampire waitress at the Alexandrite restaurant/pub in the shopping district, who possesses super-human strength. She is sexually naive.
- Elina Olegovna Oven (エリナ・オレゴヴナ・アヴェーン, Erina Oregovuna Avēn) (Voiced by: Erio Suzuki)—A Russian vampire. She works as a Bunny girl at the Orthoclase casino. She makes vulgar jokes frequently. She's different from a normal vampire because she needs to suck vampire blood to use her electricity-controlling powers.

=== Sub characters ===
- Hiyori Ōfusa (大房 ひよ里, Ōfusa Hiyori) (Voiced by: Yuka Kanematsu)
- Sayo Aragami (荒神 小夜, Aragami Sayo) (Voiced by: Ringo Aoba)
- Anna Reticle (アンナ・レティクル, Anna Retikuru) (Voiced by: Rino Kawashima)
- Moeka Awaji (淡路 萌香, Awaji Moeka) (Voiced by: Shizuku Takaido)
- Nicola Cepheus (ニコラ・ケフェウス, Nikora Kefeusu) (Voiced by: Yuzu Asano)
- Motoki Ōgi (扇 元樹, Ōgi Motoki) (Voiced by: One More Chance)
- Hyōma Masukata (枡形 兵馬, Masutaka Hyōma) (Voiced by: Devil Katō)
- Naota Kurahashi (倉端 直太, Kurahashi Naota) (Voiced by: Tetsuto Furukawa)

== Music ==
=== Theme song: Scarlet ===
- Songwriters: Yui Sakakibara, Famishin, Inohara Satoru (Angel Note)
- Performance: Yui Sakakibara

=== Character song ===
==== 1. Love Incident (character : Miu Yarai) ====
- Songwriters: kala（Angel Note），Famishin, Inohara Satoru (Angel Note)
- Performance: Miu Yarai (Voiced by: Kōri Natsuno)

==== 2. Growling! (character : Azusa mera) ====
- Songwriters: Kamishiro Ami（Angel Note），Famishin, Inohara Satoru (Angel Note)
- Performance: Azusa mera (Voiced by: Shizuku Satō)

==== 3. きっと大丈夫 (character : Rio Inamura) ====
- Songwriters: Mami Nakayama（Angel Note），Famishin, RM-G (Angel Note)
- Performance: Rio Inamura (Voiced by: Hinata Ayukawa)

==== 4. NO LIMIT (character : Elina Olegovna Obeh) ====
- Songwriters: Riryka（Angel Note），Famishin, BAL（Angel Note）
- Performance: Elina Olegovna Obeh (Voiced by: Erio Suzuki)
