= Itaike na Kanojo =

2003 video game

- Developer: Zero
- Publishers: Visual Art's (Windows, Android); AiCherry (DVDPG)
- Designer: Muririn
- Engine: RealLive
- Platforms: Windows, DVD TV game, Android
- Release: JP: October 24, 2003 (Windows); JP: April 30, 2010 (Renewal); JP: June 16, 2011 (DVDPG); JP: March 14, 2013 (Android)
- Genres: Eroge, Visual novel
- Mode: Single player

Itaike na Kanojo (いたいけな彼女; lit. She Who is Innocent) is a Japanese adult visual novel developed by Zero, a brand under Visual Art's. Itaike na Kanojo was first released as a PC game for Microsoft Windows on October 24, 2003, and was later released as a DVD TV game and an Android game. A renewal edition of the game was also released. Itaike na Kanojo is playable on the RealLive scripting engine. The gameplay in Itaike na Kanojo follows a branching plot line which offers pre-determined scenarios with courses of interaction, and focuses on the appeal of the main heroine Honoka Nanase.

The story follows Takumi Akiyoshi, an average male student who, as punishment for losing a bet, is told to confess to the class bully victim as a joke. However, she takes this seriously and clings to him. Itaike na Kanojo premiered as the 15th most sold bishōjo game in Japan during the second half of October 2003.

== Gameplay ==
Itaike na Kanojo is an erotic romance visual novel in which the player assumes the role of Takumi Akiyoshi. The gameplay requires little interaction from the player as most of the duration of the game is spent on simply reading the text that will appear on the screen; this text represents either dialogue between the various characters, or the inner thoughts of the protagonist. Every so often, the player will come to a "decision point" where he or she is given the chance to choose from options that are displayed on the screen, typically two to three at a time.

During these times, gameplay pauses until a choice is made that furthers the plot in a specific direction, depending on which choice the player makes. There are two main endings that the player will have the chance to experience, one of them is the 'good' ending, and the other is the 'bad' ending. In order to view the plot lines to their entirety, the player will have to replay the game multiple times and choose different choices during the decision points in order to further the plot in an alternate direction. Throughout gameplay, there are scenes depicting Takumi and Honoka having sexual intercourse. The only character in the game that is voiced is Honoka.

== Plot and characters ==
The story follows an average male student named Takumi Akiyoshi (秋吉拓巳, Akiyoshi Takumi). He grew up in a wealthy family, however, his parents are divorced, and he lives alone. One day, as punishment for losing to a bet, Takumi is told to confess to the class bully victim and become a couple with her for a joke. The class bully victim is a girl called Honoka Nanase (七瀬ほのか, Nanase Honoka; voiced by: Michi Tanaka), who is the main heroine of Itaike na Kanojo. Honoka has a shy, innocent personality, but also has a determined side. To his surprise, and annoyance, Honoka takes the joke seriously, and becomes his girlfriend.

Besides Takumi and Honoka, there are few other characters, one being Hiroyuki Ogata (緒方寛之, Ogata Hiroyuki). Hiroyuki is one of Takumi's friends, whom Takumi secretly hates. Another one of Takumi's friends is Yosuke Iwata (岩田洋介, Yōsuke Iwata). The bullies who pick on Honoka are Megumi Sakuragi (桜木恵, Sakuragi Megumi), and Akiko Ijima (飯島亜紀子, Ījima Akiko). Two more characters are introduced in the story, Honoka's aunt, Emiko Kawakami (川上恵美子, Kawakami Emiko), and the maid of the Akiyoshi household, Kaori Shizu (志づ香, Shidzu Kaori).

== Development, release and sales ==
Itaike na Kanojo is Zero's 28th visual novel, after the production of Erocon ~Erotic Controller 4U~. Characters featured in the visual novel were all designed by Muririn, who is known for her artwork in Is This a Zombie?, and Tenshin Ranman: Lucky or Unlucky!?. Oshima Toshihiko provides music in the game, and the only credited voice actor is Michi Tanaka, who voices Honoka. On October 24, 2003, Zero released Itaike na Kanojo for Microsoft Windows, as an 18 prohibited PC game. It was distributed as a CD-ROM containing two discs. Zero re-released the visual novel as a renewal edition on April 30, 2010, the renewal edition only contains one disc, and unlike the original version, is fully voiced.

AiCherry released Itaike na Kanojo as a DVD TV game on June 16, 2011, including any of the erotic scenes from the PC release, as did the android version of the game which followed on March 14, 2013, and was released by Zero. Itaike na Kanojo had overall average sales for a visual novel. According to a national sales ranking of bishōjo games sold in Japan, the PC release of Itaike na Kanojo premiered at No. 15 during the second half of October 2003. The visual novel charted once more at No. 26 during the first half of November 2003.

== Related media ==
=== Music ===
Itaike na Kanojo has two pieces of theme music. Music in Itaike na Kanojo was composed and arranged by Oshima Toshihiko, who also provided music for two earlier visual novels released by Zero, Hajimete no Orosuban, and Hajimete no Oisha-san. The game has an opening and insert song, which are both sung by Yuki Mashiro. Itaike na Kanojo's opening theme is "Himawari" (向日葵, Sunflower), and the insert song is "Hidarite Migite" (左手右手, Left Hand Right Hand).

=== Card game ===
Itaike na Kanojo was included in an expansion pack of a Japanese collectible card game called Lycèe Trading Card Game, which is developed by Silver Blitz and published by Broccoli. The card game mostly specializes in characters from visual novels, but sometimes from other media such as manga or anime. Silver Blitz released the expansion box on April 13, 2007.
