= 11eyes: Tsumi to Batsu to Aganai no Shōjo =

Japanese visual novel, manga series and anime series

- Cover of the visual novel

11eyes -罪と罰と贖いの少女-
- Genre: Action; Supernatural horror; Suspense
- Video game
- Developer: Lass
- Publisher: Lass (PC); 5pb. (Xbox 360, PSP)
- Genre: Eroge, Visual novel
- Platform: Microsoft Windows, Xbox 360, PlayStation Portable
- Released: April 25, 2008 (PC); April 2, 2009 (Xbox 360); January 28, 2010 (PSP)
- Manga
- Written by: Lass
- Illustrated by: Naoto Ayano
- Published by: Kadokawa Shoten
- Magazine: Comp Ace
- Original run: August 29, 2009 – September 25, 2010
- Volumes: 3
- Anime television series

11eyes
- Directed by: Masami Shimoda
- Produced by: Makoto Itō; Yūichirō Takahata; Eiji Mannō; Mana Tsurugi; Uesama
- Written by: Kenichi Kanemaki
- Music by: Shōichirō Sakamoto
- Studio: Doga Kobo
- Licensed by: NA: Sentai Filmworks; UK: MVM Films
- Original network: CTC, SUN, CTV, Tokyo MX, TVS, KBS Kyoto, AT-X
- Original run: October 6, 2009 – December 22, 2009
- Episodes: 12 + 1 OVA
- icon

11eyes: Tsumi to Batsu to Aganai no Shōjo (Japanese: 11eyes -罪と罰と贖いの少女-; lit. 11eyes: Sin, Damnation, and the Atonement Girl), known simply as 11eyes in its anime adaptation, is a Japanese adult visual novel developed and published by Lass first released on April 25, 2008, for a Microsoft Windows PC as a DVD; 11 eyes is Lass' fourth game. A port playable on the Xbox 360 entitled 11eyes CrossOver was released on April 2, 2009, published by 5pb. A manga adaptation illustrated by Naoto Ayano began serialization in the October 2009 issue of Kadokawa Shoten's Comp Ace magazine. An anime television series adaptation by Doga Kobo aired in Japan from October to December 2009. A fan disc for Windows entitled 11eyes -Resona Forma- was planned for release at Fall 2010. The anime has been licensed in North America by Sentai Filmworks; distributor Section23 Films announced that it would release the complete box set on January 11, 2011.

== Plot ==
Since losing his sister seven years ago, Kakeru Satsuki lived a detached life. He only regained a sense of normalcy through the support of his childhood friend, Yuka Minase, and their other school friends. One day, the sky turned red, the moon turned black, everyone around Kakeru and Yuka vanished, and monsters appeared in the streets. They named this altered reality "Red Night." After several similar occurrences, they encountered four other people affected by the phenomenon: Misuzu Kusakabe, a red-haired swordswoman and onmyouji; Kukuri Tachibana, a silent girl who physically resembled Kakeru's deceased sister and shared her name; Yukiko Hirohara, a cheerful girl who transforms into a cold killer when her glasses are removed; and Takahisa Tajima, a pyrokinetic with a fiery personality. Kakeru, wanting to repay Yuka's kindness and support, struggled to awaken his own latent power, which Misuzu assured him would eventually manifest. These six individuals united to survive using their unique abilities, but they became targets of grotesque creatures known as "Black Knights", who sought their deaths. The situation became more complex when the group discovered a girl named Lisette trapped within a red crystal, guarded by the Black Knights. She pleaded for their rescue. The series explores the mystery of Red Night, the identities of the Black Knights and their connection to Lisette. It also examines the significance of Kukuri's resemblance to Kakeru's deceased sister and the nature of Yuka and Kakeru's powers.

== Characters ==
Kakeru Satsuki (皐月 駆, Satsuki Kakeru)
Voiced by: Shinsuke Nakamoto (PC), Daisuke Ono (Xbox 360 & anime)
The main protagonist of the series. He and his sister were orphaned in their youth, and went to an orphanage where they first met Yuka. After his older sister committed suicide ten years prior to the main storyline, Kakeru felt that his life was empty. This was later filled by Yuka and his new friends he met in high school. He has heterochromia and wears an eyepatch over his right eye, known as the eye of Aeon, which holds what seems to be the power of precognition. It also shows him images of Velad, an ancient King of Drasuvania who also apparently possessed the eye. He is able to use his right eye in battle to predict and counter his opponent's moves. In the VN, the real power of the eye of Aeon not only covers precognition, but also allows the bearer to assimilate all the memories and abilities of countless previous bearers. Ultimately, it also allows the bearer to realize the desired future out of all the possible futures there are. The price for those powers is that upon death, the bearer's soul is absorbed into the eye as it's being passed on to a new bearer. This explains why Kakeru dreams of Velad, who was the previous bearer of the eye. The Eye of Aeon is also a magic stone on its own and is not a fragment of Liselotte's voidstone, nor can it increase her power; a complete opposite from the anime where it was the most important fragment. After this fact is revealed, the Black Knights are no longer after Kakeru's life and he is given the option to walk away from the ongoing conflicts, although he decides to keep fighting with his friends.
Yuka Minase (水奈瀬 ゆか, Minase Yuka)
Voiced by: Oto Agumi (PC), Mai Goto (Xbox 360 & anime)
Kakeru's childhood best friend. She met him at the orphanage where they grew up, and was able to help Kakeru feel better after his sister's suicide. She now attends the same high school as Kakeru and spends most of her time with him, causing most other characters to believe that she is Kakeru's girlfriend. In the later part of the story, she discovers that she also has a power that seems to negate others' powers. She and Kukuri name the power "Hand of Glory". However, it's merely a misconception of her and other companions in the "Red Night". Later in the game, she was able to remember why the bloody event at Ayame orphanage, where she, Kakeru, and Kukuri used to live as orphans, happened. It turned out that because her power was awakened and she did not know how to control it at the time, it wreaked havoc in the orphanage. The orphans living there started to go insane and killed each other. She explained Kukuri and Kakeru weren't affected due to her power to nullify. This event had such an impact on her that she sealed this portion of memories in her mind ever since and did not dare to go near the orphanage once she was adopted. Liselotte, while using her connection with the "fragments", tells Yuka that her power is "Phantasmagoria", a special technique/spell used by Liselotte herself. The power allows her to bring out others' worst memories or show people illusions of her own design. She explains that her power appears to nullify others because while being affected by Phantasmagoria, people unconsciously lose the will to maintain their power so it appears as though the power is nullified. While being conscious of her own power, she uses it to try to keep Kakeru to herself by using her power on the whole group and create an illusionary world. She later fades away and is absorbed by Liselotte because she uses up all her power creating the perfect world.
Misuzu Kusakabe (草壁 美鈴, Kusakabe Misuzu)
Voiced by: Haruka (PC), Yuu Asakawa (Xbox 360 & anime)
A red-haired swordswoman. She is one year older than Yuka and Kakeru. She is an Onmyoji from the Kusakabe clan, a clan of Onmyoji that is famous for having Oni's blood in the bloodline and the five demonic swords known as Kusakabe's Five Treasures. Misuzu possesses all five swords, keeping them in her fingernails by using dimensional magic that she learned from forbidden scrolls that were created by one of her ancestors who learned and incorporated Western magic, Kusakabe Ryoichi. While she appears to be strong, Misuzu is the weakest mind of the group. She is traumatized when Misao reveals the truth about the "fragments". For a short few days when Misao gives the remainder of the group time to think over whether they decide to continue to be her and Avaritia's opponents or to commit suicide themselves, Misuzu considers killing herself and is snapped back by Kakeru. Misuzu has feelings for Kakeru. In the final battle, she gives all she has to kill Misao by using Doujikiri Yasutsuna.
Kukuri Tachibana (橘 菊理, Tachibana Kukuri)
Voiced by: Risa Matsuda (PC), Noriko Rikimaru (Xbox 360 & anime)
A strange girl from the school who looks exactly like Kakeru's dead sister. She is one year older than Yuka and Kakeru. She has the ability to materialize her soul into the form of an angel that appears chained. She calls the angel "Abraxas". "Abraxas" attacks by sending out chains with sharp blades and has healing powers. She is the adopted daughter of the famous novelist in the area from whom she inherited her last name. She has no memories beyond five years ago, when she was 13, and seems to have lost her voice. She uses a sketchbook for communication. In one scene of 11eyes CrossOver, it is noted by Shuu indirectly that her power is unique and incredibly difficult to reproduce by mages. The chains on Abraxas are actually representation of Kukuri's lost memories. The chains are also seals of Abraxas power. In the final battle, due to Yuka's power, her lost memories return to her and Abraxas is unchained. She reveals that she is in fact Satsuki Kukuri, Kakeru's sister from an alternate reality. In her original reality, it was Kakeru who was killed in an experiment causing her to go berserk and destroy an entire facility. After that, she was transported to this reality. She reveals that her parents aren't dead but rather that Kakeru, Yuka and she were abandoned due to their powers. She also reveals that Ayame orphanage is actually a place where children with powers are assembled for research, and that the founder of the place is one of Misuzu's maternal ancestors. While unchained, Abraxas's name is "Demiurge" and has godly powers. Her left eye can peek into the past while her right eye has a power similar to the precognition power of the eye of Aeon. She also has the power of spontaneous generation (i.e., creating things from nothing). Kukuri is the only heroine in this game to have her ending as a separate act.
Yukiko Hirohara (広原 雪子, Hirohara Yukiko)
Voiced by: Miru (PC), Oma Ichimura (Xbox 360 & anime)
A lively girl who is later seen killing monsters mercilessly during the Red Night. She is a granddaughter of the Hirohara Zaibatsu, one of the richest houses in the 11eyes world. She came back to Japan from the nation Dransvania. Her primary power of regeneration makes her almost immortal. She fights using two knives. Her positive personality is maintained by a self-hypnotic suggestion while she is wearing her glasses. When the glasses are removed, her eyes and personality turn into that of a killing machine. She is one year younger than Yuka and Kakeru. When Takahisa goes berserk due to Saiko's death, she kills him as an act of mercy to free his mind from Liselotte's influence. After killing Takahisa she realizes that she loved him. In the anime her fragment is ripped out by Superbia, killing her, while in the game she is absorbed by Liselotte.
Takahisa Tajima (田島 賢久, Tajima Takahisa)
Voiced by: Andarushia (PC), Showtaro Morikubo (Xbox 360 & anime)
A young man from the school who is a pyrokineticist. He is in the same grade as Yuka and Kakeru, but is not from their class. His personality is brash and that of a loner and is easily identified with a grey mullet. He is now under the guardianship of Saeko. In his childhood, he was trying his best to survive after his parents abandoned him. Saeko was the one that took him in, but he has little to no respect for her in spite of that. Saeko first saw Tajima when she was hiding from the police. He was also the one who discovered the wall that prevents the characters from escaping the city and thus the Red Night. In the anime he lost control of himself and let the fire demon inside him take over. After destroying half the city he asked Yukiko to kill him before the fire demon completely took control of him. On 11eyes -Resona Forma- Takahisa has younger sister named Ema.

=== Black Knights ===
Avaritia (アワリティア, Awaritia)
Voiced by: Eigou Mirai (PC & Xbox 360), Yoji Ueda (anime)
The leader of the black knights and determined to crush the "fragments". He is one of the 14 saints from Index, called "George of the Rainbow". He was sent out with his subordinates to eliminate Index top priority threat, Liselotte Werckmeister. After a seemingly losing battle with Liselotte at Ayame's Hill 70 years ago, he used his last resort, the forbidden technique, Contract of the Rainbow to split Liselotte's soul and the piece of Emerald Tablet within her into seven fragments to weaken her. Liselotte with one of the fragments remaining in her body was sealed within the crystal. The other fragments, due to the technique, were scattered across six parallel worlds. This explains why he calls the gang "fragments" because their bodies contain those "fragments" and those "fragments" are the sources of their powers. In his past mission, he sealed a dragon within his body with the same technique and releases it in the final battle to crush the "fragments" and Liselotte with the price of losing himself. It took a lot out of him to maintain seal of the dragon within his body and at the same time Liselotte's seal.
Ira (イラ, Ira)
Voiced by: Margarine Tengu (PC & Xbox 360), Yuki Fujiwara (anime)
The second Black Knight to be slain. Killed by Kakeru, a slimly muscular male with predatory, slanted red eyes. He is armed with scythes embedded on his forearms. He specializes in Chinese martial arts. He is actually an apostle of Index and at the same time a subordinate of George of the Rainbow. His index's name is "Sebastian of the Holy Bone".
Invidia (インウィディア, Inwidia)
Voiced by: Risa Matsuda (PC), Noriko Rikimaru (Xbox 360)
She is the only female Black Knight beside Superbia and is the only member with wings that can fly. She uses a sword that resembles a spine that specializes for long range attack. The fourth knight to be killed. She plans to explode herself and take down everyone in Kakeru's gang with her. Her attempt fails due to Yuka's awakened power and Yukiko kills her by stabbing her forehead. She is also a subordinate of George of the Rainbow and her Index's name is "Elaine of the Dragon Skeleton". In the game, it is revealed that she loves Sebastian.
Acedia (アケディア, Akedia)
Voiced by: Uoshuyaki (PC & Xbox 360), Yoshiya Naruke (anime)
The "mage" of the group. He is after the bearer of the eye of Aeon and uses scrolls as his weapons. He is quickly killed by Kukuri, however one part of its head "scholastica" manages to flee. However it is killed by Shiori afterwards. In the game, his two-parted head is cut down by Misuzu using Doujikiri and Scholastica dies at this time instead and Acedia is killed by Shiori afterward. Scholastica is actually Acedia's sister and they share a body. His Index's name is "Benedict of the Bookshelf". It is revealed by Shiori that Benedict and George are people in her family line. Shiori refers to him as her prototype when she kills him.
Gula (グラ, Gura)
Voiced by: Keisuke Kuroiwa (PC & Xbox 360), Teruyuki Tanzawa (anime)
One of the Black Knights, whose figure is a giant fat male with a club as its weapon. He is also the first one to die. He was killed by Misuzu. His role in the story and within the Black Knight group is most minor. His Index's name is "Samson of the Holy Club".
Superbia (スペルビア, Superubia)
Voiced by: Erena Kaibara (PC), Hyo-sei (Xbox 360)
The most powerful Black Knight after Avaritia. She fights using two Japanese swords that are similar to Misuzu's. She is in fact the only Black Knight who has no association with Index. Rather, she is actually Kusakabe Misao, the Kusakabe onmyoji that Misuzu admires. She reveals that her two swords were part of Kusakabe's treasures. The swords she has, Onikiri and Kumokiri, in additions to Misuzu's, were once referred as Kusakabe's Seven Swords. After she took the two swords and left her clan, the swords that Misuzu has then became Kusakabe's Five Treasures. In the game, she looks down on all the "fragments" and Kakeru except Shiori because only Shiori is strong enough to fight her. She is also the only member of the Black Knights who is actually alive or living without burden. The four subordinates of George are actually dead and their souls are bound by her with Larva (the Red Night's creatures) as their bodies. She also sealed the memories they had while they were alive. She also contributes part of her power to help keeping the dragon sealed within George. It is hinted that she helps George and his group because she admires and loves him.

They are named after the 7 Cardinal Sins.

=== Sub characters ===
Shiori Momono (百野 栞, Momono Shiori)
Voiced by: Honoka Imuraya (PC), Emiko Hagiwara (Xbox 360 & anime)
She is a "traditional magician" and is usually seen with a book. She seemed indifferent to the students who approached her in class at first but eventually warmed up to Kaori and Tadashi and grew to treasure them due to their friendly spirit. Her secret identity is that of an apostle of Index, the largest magical organization within the world of 11eyes and 3days. Her real name given by Index is "Ursula of the Bookshelf". She transferred to Kakeru's school to monitor the place and report its situation to Index. Her assignment was due to the sudden disappearance of the last warden. She is extremely powerful and is a candidate for the next 14 saints, the highest officials within Index. However, her family line is cursed to be born without eyeballs. In her case, the curse is even worse and she couldn't even move a finger. Her current body is a magical artifact that her brain and nervous system were transplanted into and which allows her to hold 5000 magical books within. The body operates by absorbing magical energy. In the anime she gave her fragment to Kakeru to send Liselotte to the space-time rift. She is a classmate of Yuka and Kakeru. One of the main heroines in 11eyes CrossOver.
Kaori Natsuki (奈月 香央里, Natsuki Kaori)
Voiced by: Harumi Nukumori (PC), Kaori Mizuhashi (Xbox 360 & anime)
She is a good friend of Yuka and Kakeru, often seen hitting Tadashi due to his personality. She is also a classmate of Yuka and Kakeru. One of the main heroines in 11eyes CrossOver. Her involvement in 11eyes CrossOver is due to her being a target of the doppelganger.
Tadashi Teruya (照屋 匡, Teruya Tadashi)
Voiced by: Ouen Maikeru (PC), Kouta Nemoto (Xbox 360)
A good friend of Yuka and Kakeru, who is often hit by Kaori. His role in the story is that of the class clown and the perverted friend. He is a classmate of Yuka and Kakeru.
Saeko Akamine (赤嶺 彩子, Akamine Saiko)
Voiced by: AYAKO (PC), Chiaki Takahashi (Xbox 360 & anime)
The doctor at the school. The current guardian of Takahisa. In her youth, she was the gang leader of an all girl gang called "Kurenai Tenyo".
Lisette Weltall (リゼット・ヴェルトール, Rizetto Verutōru)
Voiced by: RINA (PC), Ayano Niina (Xbox 360)
The girl in the crystal who is tied deeply to the world of the "Red Night" itself. While she is basically good at heart, she has a split personality known as Liselotte Werckmeister. It is Liselotte who is the master of the "Red Night". Lisette was raped and almost killed as a child, and due to that incident Liselotte was born.
Verard (ヴェラード, Verādo)
Voiced by: Hitoshi Bifu (PC & Xbox 360)
Also called Velad or Vlad. He is the mysterious man appeared in Kakeru's dreams, who also possesses the Eye of Aeon. It is revealed that he is King of Drasuvania. He was Liselotte's lover. It was because of his death that she decided to destroy the world using the "Black Moon".

=== New characters in 11eyes CrossOver ===
Shū Amami (天見 修, Amami Shū)
The protagonist in 11eyes CrossOver. He is known as a "modern mage", those who activate their sorceries using technology such as cell phones linking to servers that can access the spiritual plane instead of using grimories. Apparently, this was a special method created by his grandfather. He is from the same class as Yuka, Kakeru, Shione and Mio.
Shione Azuma (吾妻 汐音, Azuma Shione)
Voiced by: Mai Nakahara
She is from the same class as Yuka, Kakeru, Mio and Shū. She had a crush on Shū and confessed to him. However, she was rejected, as Shū was afraid that his life of a magician would put her in danger.
Mio Kouno (紅野 澪, Kōno Mio)
Voiced by: Emiri Katō
Another character being able to use "modern magic". Her father happened to be Shū's grandfather's student, explaining her knowledge in the special magic style. She is from the same class as Yuka, Kakeru, Shione and Shū.
Kanae Kuroshiba (黒芝 かなえ, Kuroshiba Kanae)
Voiced by: Rie Tanaka
A classmate of Takahisa. Often seen with a book. She is secretly the main antagonist of 11eyes CrossOver. She is an extremely powerful witch who has been living for over a century. She is even more powerful than Shiori and is able to call for her koyu kekkai by just a finger snap. She seems to be well aware of the "Red Night" and its purpose, but she avoid letting others besides Shiori knows that fact. She belongs to Thule Society, a group of magical organization created by the Nazi during World War II and consist of seven extremely powerful dark art users to oppose and try to eliminate Index. She has a Kirakishou-Suigintou complex with Liselotte. It's through her manipulation and engineering that send the doppelganger to kidnap and sacrifice the victims' live force to the "Artificial Emerald Tablet" inside her mirror Koyu Kekkai. The "Artificial Emerald" is her plan of secret world domination. The "Artificial Emerald Tablet" is created by the sacrificed life forces of specific people and would be completed once the ten thousandth victim is sacrificed. While under construction, the "Artificial Emerald Tablet" allows her to tune magical power within her mirror koyu kekkai to her own advantage so other people can't activate their sorcery inside it. Upon completion, the effect of the tablet would extend to the whole world and she would basically be able dominate the world since there would be no magus or other sorcery users to stop her. She claims part of the reason for doing this is to prevent Liselotte from destroying the world.

=== New characters in 11eyes Resona Forma ===
Johanna (ヨハンナ, Yohanna)
The founder and current pope of the Holy Office of Index. She has been the head of Index for almost a millennium, making her the oldest character of 11eyes. For that, some apostles of Index called her Great Mother Johanna (母なるヨハンナ, Haha Naru Yohanna) out of respect. In addition, Johanna is also known for having been collecting magical items from around the world to prevent them from falling into the wrong hands, thus, giving her the name Johanna of the Vault. Apparently, the most valuable and powerful item that she collected is the God's Name Tablet, the largest fragment of the Emerald Tablet found.
Sophia Measley (ソフィア・ミーズリー, Sofia Miizurii)
Index's top researcher and the creator of Shiori's artificial body. She used to be a member of Thule Society, but it was only for having funding for her research and Sophia herself was not very devoted to the organization. After Germany's defeat in 1945, she joined Index.
Ema Tajima (田島 恵麻, Tajima Ema)
A first year of Kouryoukan Academy and Takahisa's younger sister. During her childhood, she was frequently abused by her father and her older brother Takahisa was the only one who actually cared for her. After an event when Takahisa accidentally burned the house down with his newly awakened power while trying to save his sister from their father, they had to move to Ayame Garden. However, Takahisa ran off from the orphanage not long afterwards, as he feared that his power would also kill his sister like how he killed his father.

== Media ==
=== Video games ===
- 11eyes ~Tsumi to Batsu to Aganai no Shoujo~
  - Released for PC on April 25, 2008.
- 11eyes Crossover
  - A modified version of the original. Adult content was removed but some additional story and characters were introduced. Released for Xbox 360 on April 2, 2009, for PSP on January 28, 2010, and for iOS on December 2, 2010.
- 11eyes -Resona Forma-
  - A fandisc released for PC on April 15, 2011.

=== Anime ===
#	Title	Original release date
1	"Red Night" "Akai Yoru" (赤い夜 〜Vörös éjszaka)	October 6, 2009
After witnessing his sister’s suicide, Kakeru Satsuki lives the remainder of his childhood in an orphanage, where he meets a young girl named Yuka Minase, who becomes his first friend. Yuka helps Kakeru open up to the world again, and they attend high school at Rainbow High together along with two new friends, the slightly perverted Tadashi Teruya and the hot-headed Kaori Natsuki, who keeps Tadashi under control. The ordinary days they have come to expect are overturned when they are thrown into an alternate world which they call "Red Night" due to the sky turning blood-red and the moon turning black. In it, everyone has disappeared and they are pursued by nightmarish creatures bent on their death. However, as quick as it appeared, the Red Night mysteriously ends. Both are left unsure if their experience was simply their imagination. As they walk to school together, Kakeru reflects on how Yuka had always taken care of him, and vows to protect her if the Red Night ever happens again. Later that same day a queer new student named Shiori Momono transfers into their class after having moved to Japan from Italy. As the other students pepper her with questions, she announces that she has no interest in them and walks towards Yuka and Kakeru instead. The moment Yuka makes eye contact however, she faints, and is carried to the infirmary by Kakeru. The doctor questions Yuka about his covered right eye after he leaves, to which Yuka explains that Kakeru can't see through that eye, and they are both different coloured, so he wears an eyepatch. After school, the duo go to the mall, where they are watched over by a strange girl resembling Kakeru's sister who is in turn watched over by Shiori.
2	"The Maiden of Crystal Palace" "Suishō no Shōjo" (水晶の少女 〜A kristály palotában hajadon)	October 13, 2009
Kakeru and Yuka are thrown back into the Red Night dimension again. This time they meet a strong young woman named Misuzu Kusakabe, a senior at Rainbow High who saves them from a horde of the evil nightmarish creatures using a lightning sword. As they run away, the two question Mizusu about this world, which she believes to be another dimension created by someone, thus reflecting the same scenery but running on different space-time. Misuzu asks them if they possess any special powers like herself, and the answer is no. The trio then try to make their way to the crystal towers in the center of the city, which according to Misuzu are full of powerful energy, for a chance of escape. However, an odd insect-like woman appears before them and declares that they cannot pass. At that, the woman and Misuzu begin to duel. Instead of fighting to win, Misuzu, Yuka and Kakeru are successful in their attempt to flee to the crystal towers, where they stumble upon a young maiden trapped within a crystal. She introduces herself as Lisette and Misuzu believes her to be an enemy who created this world. The trio are attacked by some much-stronger adversaries, earning them the name of "Black Knight" due to their blackish appearance but once again find themselves returned to the normal world. The three of them head to a cafe to calm themselves, where Misuzu explains that she has seen others in the Red Night too: one boy and two girls, and all are students at Rainbow High. Misuzu asks Kakeru to take off his eyepatch, revealing a golden right eye, and tests Yuka if she can feel any electric charges she released, which Yuka does not. While walking home, Kakeru espies his older sister, but she turns out to be Shiori instead. Kakeru then goes to the cafe he works part-time at to give him a leave, only to meet another part-timer there, a cheerful young girl who is a freshman at Rainbow High named Yukiko Hirohara. With her back turned to them, the fresh cut on her wrist mysteriously disappears. The next day, at the library, Yuka and Kakeru are trying to search up on the Red Night, and as Kakeru takes a book titled "The Maiden of Crystal Palace", catches sight of his sister's eye staring right back at him, with a note left on the ground that tells him he has awakened the Devil. Kakeru then starts groaning with pain as his right eye aches once more.
3	"The Lonely Pride" "Kodoku na Hokori" (孤独な誇り 〜Egyedülálló büszkeség)	October 20, 2009
Kakeru, Misuzu and Yuka find out that the moon has turned black, this time in the real world. With such a bad omen, Misuzu tells them that if they are ever sent into the Red Night again, the school will be their meeting place. Kakeru, wishing to protect Yuka, asks Misuzu if she will teach him how to use a sword. Misuzu refuses, but Kakeru is determined to learn so he can protect Yuka the next time they are taken to the Red Night. Meanwhile, a lonely and worried Yuka encounters Yukiko, who cheers her up with her lively smile. Yuka also notices that Yukiko is interested in the school delinquent, Takahisa Tajima. After school, Kakeru trains alone on the field using a baseball bat, closely watched over by Shiori and Yuka. After watching him train, Misuzu takes him and Yuka back to her home, where she shows them her true abilities, which comes in five different sword forms that are kept sealed on her nails, the answer to why she wears gloves. It was also initially under the agreement that only one sword could belong to one person, but Misuzu won against all five of the swords, causing her family to seek her life, prompting her to move to this part of Japan. Finishing her introduction, Misuzu begins Kakeru's training. She later explains to Yuka that she cut down her own father to get the last sword. As Kakeru laments with frustration, the Red Night appears again, and the stronger Black Knights are sent to dispose of them, the "fragments". As a Black Knight is about to crush Yuka and Kakeru, chains appear out of nowhere and frighten the Black Knight to escape. Meanwhile, as Misuzu faces difficulty defeating Gula, one of the Black Knights, but thanks to a girl stabbing him, Misuzu is able to finish him off, causing one of the crystal towers in the center of the Red Night to disappear. Trapped under the broken car with an unconscious Yuka, Kakeru vaguely sees his older sister looking down at him peacefully.
4	"Smiling Behind a Facade" "Kamen no Bishō" (仮面の微笑 〜A mosolygó maszk)	October 27, 2009
Takahisa and Yukiko are revealed to be two of the few in the Red Night, with Takahisa having the ability to manipulate fire. Yukiko happily introduces Yuka, Kakeru and Misuzu to Takahisa, calling him "Mr. Hero of Justice" after he saved her from a monster. Kakeru is determined to find his power after Takahisa teases him but cannot seem to awaken it. As he trains, he sees Misuzu leaping towards Yuka, and he jumps in front of her to take the blow only to find everyone staring at him. Misuzu, although her face betrays no emotion, was in truth really thinking of pointing her sword at Yuka to test his resolve, but didn't do it in the end. The next day at school, they are taken once more to the Red Night and are attacked by two of the Black Knights named Ira and Invidia. Misuzu tries to fight and hold back Ira but fails to break the standoff. She is saved by Yukiko, who enters the fight very nearly delivering a death blow to Misuzu's opponent when she is impaled from behind by Invidia. Just as the Black Knights are assured of victory, Takahisa ignites them and the Red Night ends once again. Yukiko staggers up and puts on her glasses again, turning into the cheerful and outgoing freshman they know so well. She also reveals her regeneration skills by healing the large wound in her stomach. After a hug from Yuka, Yukiko tells them that she was born in the country of Dransvania, where there were constant massacres, also where she found her abilities. Yukiko then thanks them for accepting her for who she is, bloody personality and regeneration skills and all.
5	"For My Friends and For Tomorrow" "Tomo to Asu no Tameni" (友と明日のために 〜Barátokért és a holnapért)	November 3, 2009
Yuka faints again at school, and the school doctor, Saeko Akamine concludes that it is anemia. She also reveals to them that she is Takahisa's legal guardian after discovering him living on the streets as a child. After the visit to the infirmary, Kakeru and Yuka are firstly introduced to the mute Kukuri Tachibana, who is identical in looks and name to Kakeru's dead sister, shocking Yuka and Kakeru especially. Meanwhile, Takahisa gets into a motorcycle accident to find that there is a barrier in the middle of the city that only he cannot pass through. Kakeru resumes his sword training with Mizusu at school, soon after which the Red Night falls. During the Red Night, Misuzu is immediately engaged by Invidia, and Yuka and Kakeru are again forced to escape. While running away, they are met by Ira who blocks their way out of the school grounds. He at first overwhelms Kakeru, but eventually Kakeru's powers awaken in a battle protecting Yuka, allowing him to detect his movements before he executes them, and Kakeru manages to fell his opponent. Despite his victory, Kakeru falls to the ground violently convulsing with pain.
6	"Upset Heart" "Kokoro Midarete" (心乱れて 〜szíbtép fájdalom)	November 10, 2009
Kakeru is stuck in a coma racked with pain and his past memories. His friends are by his side, worried for his state of health. Misuzu attempts a ritual to heal him and free Kakeru of his torment. His right eye, or known as The Eye of Aeon activates and past and present meet in a meeting of the minds. The next morning, Kakeru awakens healed to a weakened Misuzu who is passed out in his lap. Yuka, who comes to check up on him, witnesses only this, completely misinterpreting what she had seen. The others gather for breakfast. A short, enjoyable peace is broken when Misuzu has a dizzy spell which Kakeru responded to with concern, upsetting Yuka, and causing her to blindly flee. Kakeru finally catches up with Yuka on the school rooftop and assures her that Misuzu and he are only friends. Yuka confesses her feelings for him, wanting a kiss to legitimize their relationship. Kakeru refuses, making Yuka run away again. As Kakeru once again tries to follow, the Red Night falls. A standoff ensues between their team of dubbed "fragments" and the Black Knights. As the battle begins Misuzu readies herself for a fight and Yukiko starts to engage in battle when Kukuri reveals her powers and slaughters all the nightmare blobs and a Black Knight named Scholastica in the process. After everyone regroups, Takahisa reveals that he has found Yuka's tattered backpack. Kakeru, fearing the worst, looks for Yuka.
7	"Twisted Awakening" "Yuganda Kakusei" (歪んだ覚醒 〜kanyargos ebredes)	November 17, 2009
With no one to protect her now, Yuka is desperately trying to run and forget her fears about Kakeru and Misuzu. The others search in vain for Yuka, fearing the worst, and split up to find her. Kakeru and Takahisa search in the school while the girls search the city. Meanwhile, Lisette awakens to find herself alone and tests the limits of the crystal barrier. Yukiko manages to find Yuka at a temple, talking to herself about Kakeru. Aravitia, the chief Black Knight, notices Lisette's attempted escape and leaves the matter of the Fragments to the other Black Knights. Yukiko tries to cheer up Yuka as she laments both her lack of power and her belief that Kakeru is becoming distanced from her. Yukiko advises that it may be for the best, revealing her own bloody past. The boys continue to search as Scholastica, wounded and dazed, disintegrates before their eyes. Misuzu meets with them as Invidia appears, wishing revenge for marring her face and body. Kakeru activates the Eye of Aeon to fight Invidia and manages to land a severe blow before the pain begins to cripple him. Superbia and Misuzu duel as the Black Knight remarks about Misuzu's Onmyoji heritage. Misuzu become suspicious of Superbia's knowledge but that becomes unimportant as Superbia displays the Kusakabe duel-blade stance and takes a human form, revealing herself to be a female warrior once part of Misuzu's family that Misuzu once idolized, Misao Kusakabe. Takahisa continues his battle with Invidia but both reach their limits. Yukiko and Kukuri arrive on the scene and attack Invidia. A cyclone then traps them with Invidia and she reveals her explosive blood. Yuka suddenly appears and cries for Kakeru, activating her latent power. Invidia's power, Misuzu's sword, and Kukuri's chains all disappear. When Yukiko realizes Invidia has been neutralized, she stabs her in the head. Misuzu explains that Yuka has the dangerous power of nullification, the ability to prevent the use of enemies' or friends' powers. Then Yuka faints because she used her powers too much.
8	"Witching Hour" "Ōma ga Toki" (逢魔が時〜félhomály öv)	November 24, 2009
The Black Knights converse over the Fragments. Yuka awakens the next morning to see Kakeru dozing on a chair beside her bed. He enquires if she is alright and Yuka assures him and declares she wishes to protect him. Downstairs in the living room, Misuzu and Takahisa discuss Yuka's power, the Red Night and the reason they are chased by the Black Knights. Kakeru confronts Kukuri about the notebook and asks her to leave Yuka alone. After Takahisa leaves to in search of Yukiko, Misuzu checks the oni barrier around her house, which shows hairline cracks. Meanwhile Yukiko tells Takahisa about how much everyone means to her and how much loss she has suffered as Kakeru follows Misuzu to her dojo, where Misuzu shows him the mark branded into her shoulder. She then cuts herself and offers Kakeru the power of the Kusakabe by drinking her blood. Yuka witnesses this intimate moment and then faints. Takahisa has made his way back to school but is caught by Saeko for being late after scolding him she wants him to meet her after school to go out to eat. In class Shiori gets a love letter which she destroys then asks to go to the nurses office. A raven goes to attack Shiori but she reveals magical abilities by destroying the bird. Remarking to herself that she can't stay out of it any longer. Yuka wakes from her blackout as Kakeru and Misuzu duel. Kakeru finds his movements light and agile. He uses the eye and predicts Misuzu's next move hitting her hard and wounding her. Yuka walks in and offers Misuzu a hanky for her cut then suddenly leans forward and licks her blood exclaiming shes just like Kakeru. Yukiko found Takahisa at school and they share a very warm moment. Kukuri and Misuzu are walking to school, Misuzu comforts Kukuri about Kakeru not trusting her. Back at the house Yuka and Kakeru start to do some chores around the house when they hear a noise. Kakeru goes to check it out and finds Shiori who blasts him with magic then tells him cryptically, "you are the one who awakened the demon." Takahisa and Yukiko go to meet Saeko and found her strung up magically, dead with Superbia seated beside her.
9	"Breaking Bonds" "Kowareta Kizuna" (壊れた絆 〜törött kötés)	December 1, 2009
After seeing Saeko strung up by Superbia, Takahisa goes into a fit of rage; exactly what his parents had feared and thus abandoned him on the streets. Meanwhile, Shiori informs Kakeru that only he can stop the demon. Things start to stir up when Takahisa is revealed to be fighting a Superbia clone, and at the same time Misuzu is fighting the real Superbia. Kakeru and Kukuri come to aid Misuzu, and Superbia retreats. Misuzu realizes that her and Superbia's power are far too great a distance in strength, and hangs her head in despair. Yukiko confronts the group as they are discussing the Black Knights, covered in blood, shaking with tears and revealed that she has killed Takahisa.
10	"The Witch Awakens" "Majo Kakusei" (魔女覚醒 〜bukott angyal)	December 8, 2009
Shiori comes and tells Kakeru and Misuzu everything about the Red Night and about the Black Knights, revealing herself to be a young magician and librarian of a secret magical organization called the Index. In her explanation, she shows several key facts, starting with the girl in the crystal, Lisette. Lisette is actually the mirror image of a wicked witch named Liselotte, who seeks to destroy the world to fulfill her lover, a man named Verard's, dying wish. 64 years prior, Liselotte was sealed away by Index using a forbidden spell. However, by doing so, the various members that accomplished it turned into hideous creatures who are now called the Black Knights, who guard Liselotte's seal. While Liselotte remains trapped, due to her immortality, her soul could only be separated, so that is what the Black Knights did. They split her soul into seven pieces and threw them into different human bodies that resided in different parallel worlds, which have now all been brought together mysteriously in the same world in the form of Kakeru, Yuka, Yukiko, Misuzu, Takahisa, Kukuri, and Shiori. If all the fragments of her soul are recollected into Liselotte's body, she can grant her wish to destroy the world by sending it into Hell via the black moon. This makes the Black Knights hunt them for their souls. Shiori is forced to stop when the Red Night appears, and the group is immediately engaged in battle. Meanwhile, Yukiko, who is grieving for Takahisa, now seeks vengeance against the Black Knights and goes alone to fight them. Yuka tries to protect Kakeru, but faints again, and Kakeru locks her in a classroom to keep her safe and joins the others to search for Yukiko. Meanwhile, Yukiko loses to Misao, who gruesomely kills Yukiko and takes her fragment of Liselotte's soul, which will prevent Yukiko from regenerating. When Kakeru, Misuzu, and Shiori arrive, they find Yukiko's dead body there but Yuka suddenly appears and take Yukiko's fragment from Misao, and throwing it towards the red crystal. The seal is destroyed and Lisette, now Liselotte, awakens.
11	"The Choice called Destruction" "Metsubō to Iu Sentaku〜válogatott-hoz kialvás" (滅亡という選択〜válogatott-hoz kialvás)	December 15, 2009
Liselotte awakens and proceeds to kill Yuka and absorb her fragment. Kakeru envisions the flashback and try to reflect the power, but fails. Now that Yuka and Yukiko's fragments have been absorbed, Liselotte gains her dark powers again. Avaritia, in order to protect the remaining fragments, teleport Misuzu and Kakeru out of the Red Night, while Shiori stays behind to fight Liselotte alongside Misao and Avaritia (in his dragon form, Georgius.) Meanwhile, Kakeru and Misuzu try to find out if Yuka is still alive and tries to find their way back into the Red Night. As Shiori is about to be absorbed and killed by Liselotte, Kukuri appears and transforms into Abraxus, the spirit inhabiting her body and Misao tries to hold Liselotte still while Avaritia fires a blast at them. In Yuka's world, as the black moon is coming closer, Kakeru and Misuzu discuss what they should do if the others fail and proceed to do a "ritual" (which requires them to have sex) to power up Kakeru's abilities. A crack that leads them to the Red Night opens, and Misao appears behind them and tells them that her love, Avaritia, died, Abraxus was killed, and Shiori committed suicide. She told them indirectly that this too, might happen to Misuzu (In this case, Kakeru). After Misao dies, Yuka comes out. As Kakeru walks towards her, he is stabbed by Liselotte using Yuka's body and has his body and the Eye of Aeon absorbed into her. She also absorbs Misuzu. Liselotte, remembers her discussion with Verard about destroying the world. It seems that everyone is dead. Then, Yuka proceeds to say, "...and the two of them lived happily ever after." Kakeru disagrees on this ending.
12	"Daybreak of the Dark Night" "Yamiyo no Akatsuki〜a sötét hajnal" (闇夜の暁〜a sötét hajnal)	December 22, 2009
As it turns out, all of the events in Episode 11 were just Kakeru's vision of what would happen if he were to protect Yuka from Liselotte's attack. Determined to forestall those events from occurring Kakeru decides to kill himself to prevent Liselotte from taking his Eye. After stabbing himself, he has a flashback and remembers all of his childhood memories, particularly how Yuka has always looked out for him. To his surprise he wakes up in the infirmary. Misuzu explains that is he alive because Yuka nullified the sword when he stabbed himself, and that Liselotte couldn't fight on due to Yuka's ability also nullifying her powers. Kakeru then notices Yuka sleeping in the bed next to his. Shiori appears and introduces Kakeru to Abraxas, the spirit that his sister Kukuri hosted within her body. She further explains how Kukuri is still alive and how Abraxas killed Kakeru in another World among other things. The group feels the world shift and watch as Yuka is absorbed by the bed. The group races to the roof to find that the Black Moon is near, and Liselotte that has sealed Yuka in a crystal so that she is unable to use her nullification power. Kakeru demands Yuka's return and agrees to Liselotte's demand that he give himself up. Shiori and Abraxas attack Liselotte, but fail. The two remaining Black Knights arrive to give assistance. Superbia shields Kakeru and Avaritia engages Liselotte, stalling her for a short time. Abraxas uses the time gained by Avaritia to give Shiori's fragment to Kakeru, and Superbia informs him that with the Eye of Aeon and Shiori's fragment which has the ability to travel through space-time, he may be able to seal Liselotte in a dimensional rift. The Red Night reappears and Misuzu draws the forbidden Doujikiri Yasutsuna sword to shield Kakeru. While Kakeru is facing off with Liselotte, the voice of Velad, the former bearer of the Eye of Aeon, appears in Liselotte's mind, stating that it is foolish to destroy the world. Liselotte, however, no longer cares about destroying the world to avenge Velad but is, instead, determined to obtain the Eye of Aeon, a fragment of the Emerald Tablet, for herself. Together, Misuzu and Misao counter the power Liselotte is releasing, but she disappears. Kakeru, using the Eye of Aeon, saw where Liselotte was going reappear and surprises her. When he uses Shiori's fragment to seal her away Liselotte tries to flee but is hindered by Avaritia and the two of them are drawn into in the dimensional rift contained in the crystal fragment. As a result of Liselotte's disappearance Yuka is freed and the Red Night starts to collapse. Misao uses what appears to be the last of her energy to return Kakeru, Yuka and Misuzu to the real world - a World of Peace. In this world, only Kakeru, Yuka, and Misuzu are aware of the events of the Red Night. Yukiko and Takahisa along with Saiko are alive but have forgotten about the Red Night and that they knew Kakeru and the others. The story ends with Misuzu asking Kakeru and Yuka if they want to accompany her to Ayanas. As Kakeru looks up in the sky with his Eye of Aeon he sees that the Black Moon still exists. The episode concludes with the text 'Akarat on jon holnap?' which means 'Will you come tomorrow?', which may imply a future sequel or second season.
13 (OVA)	"Pink Phantasm and Dream Story" "Momoiro Genmutan 〜rö zsaszí n é jszaka" (桃色幻夢譚 〜rö zsaszí n é jszaka)	June 25, 2010
The seven main character enter a "Pink Night" where their powers have a perverted twist: Kakeru can see through everyone's clothes, Yuka changes the boys into girls, Misuzu's swords are turned into vibrators, Kukuri can speak but only says and draws profanities, Yukiko becomes sexually excited upon taking off her glasses, and Takahisa sprinkles a small fountain of water. The events of this episode are merely a parody of the main series and have nothing to do with the other 12 episodes.

=== Music ===
The original 11eyes visual novel has three pieces of theme music; one opening theme, one ending theme, and one insert song. The opening theme is "Lunatic Tears" by Ayane, the ending theme is "Kegare Naki Yume" (穢れ亡き夢) by Asriel, and the insert song is "Bōkyaku no Tsurugi" (忘却の剣) by Ayane. 11eyes CrossOver has one opening theme, "Endless Tears..." by Ayane, and one ending theme, "Tsuioku no Chikai" (追憶の誓い) by Asriel. A soundtrack album of music from the games was released on May 5, 2009, by Lass, although it was never sold commercially. The anime series' opening theme is "Arrival of Tears" by Ayane, and the ending theme is "Sequentia" by Asriel. The trailer of the PSP version of 11eyes Crossover used the song "Shinjitsu e no Requiem" (真実ヘの鎮魂歌) by Ayane.

== Reception ==
The anime's music was cited as one of its strong points by Anime News Network's Theron Martin. Martin said 11 Eyes tries to "do something different" for the genre but it doesn't have "the caliber" for this. He praised some things: the plot twist, and the second half of the series but he stated the good moments are "infrequent". Chris Beveridge from Mania.com compared it with Venus Versus Virus, and noted 11 Eyes "has some nice ideas but didn't execute it well".
