= Yorite Konoha wa Kurenai ni =

Eroge visual novel by Lump of Sugar

- Cover Art from the Visual Novel
- Developer: Lump of Sugar
- Publisher: Lump of Sugar
- Producer: KawausoP
- Artists: Moekibara Fumitake; Kanade Nakoto
- Writers: Mizuki Satori; Tetsujin; Yoshii Hajime
- Platform: Microsoft Windows
- Release: JP: January 26th 2018
- Genres: Eroge, Visual novel, Bishōjo game
- Mode: Single-player

Yorite Konoha wa Kurenai ni (縁りて此の葉は紅に) is an adult visual novel created by Japanese game developer Lump of Sugar and released on January 26, 2018. The gameplay in Yorite Konoha wa Kurenai ni follows a branching plot line that offers pre-determined scenarios and options for the player to choose their actions. The game mainly focuses on the appeal of the four main female characters.

== Gameplay ==
Typical gameplay from Yorite Konoha wa Kurenai Ni, showing dialogue and character sprites. From left to right: Ikaruga Kazuha, Tarumi Konoha, and Sasaura Suzuna.

Yorite Konoha wa Kurenai ni is a romance visual novel in which the player assumes the role of Seiji Sasaura. Most of the gameplay is spent reading text, representing the story's dialogue as well as Seiji's inner thoughts. The text is displayed alongside character sprites. The player encounters different CG artworks throughout the game. It has multiple different routes for the story to take based on the player's decisions. The game revolves around the four main heroines, following a branching plotline where the player chooses different "routes" for each of the characters. The game consists almost entirely of game sprites displayed alongside text to make the emotions of the characters clearer. There are also pre-rendered CG scenes, often at pivotal points in the story. The game depicts the main character performing sexual acts with the four main characters.

== Plot ==
=== Setting ===
The story is set in a world where humans and beings referred to as "Mahoroi" coexist on Earth. The Maharoi possess animal features and spiritual abilities and live longer compared to their human counterparts. Humans have coexisted with these beings for hundreds of years. The story is set in its entirety in the town of Tsugumomi, with events taking place in various locations in Konoha's house and outdoors in the woods. The story is set during autumn.

=== Story and characters ===
The story follows Sasaura Seiji (笹浦 清司), the main character, as he moves into the town of Tsugumomi because his parents need to spend time overseas for business. They stay with a family friend, called Konoha, who lets him stay in her home. Seiji used to live there when he was young, but has lost all memory of that time. The story begins with Seiji and his sister, called Sasaura Suzuna (笹浦 すずな), who are on a train on the way to Tsugumomi. Suzuna is presented as having a close, lovey-dovey relationship with her brother Seiji. When they come to Konoha's house, they meet Ikaruga Kazuha (斑鳩 和羽), a maid employed part-time at Konoha's house who is shown to be inept and have a stoic personality. She leads Seiji and Suzuna to Konoha's room, where they meet Tarumi Konoha (稜未 小乃葉), a half-Mahoroi that is over 200 years old with a childlike appearance. They also meet Kinari Momiji (木那里 もみじ) in the town of Tsugumomi, who has forgotten everything about herself other than her own name and that the main character is her "master". The story then branches off into four different routes, one for each character.

In Suzuna's route, she is shown to be lazy (leaving even dressing herself for her brother to do) and has a mischievous personality, constantly teasing and trying to seduce her brother. The protagonist remarks that her personality reminds him of the Cheshire Cat. She is shown to be hopelessly in love with him, but whenever he confronts her about it, she acts flustered and defensive. She is very envious of Momiji and her openness with Seiji. In Momiji's route, the "master and pet" dynamic runs throughout her story arc. Mojimi and Seiji grow closer throughout the story, and even when Seiji tries to distance himself from her (for her own sake), she begs to be with him again. The second half of her story focuses on her true identity, which is revealed in the common route as well. She is very expressive and feels strong emotions towards the protagonist, showing no inhibitions and a lack of understanding of social norms. She is also excitable and displays dog-like behaviour, for example: going for walks, playing fetch, being petted, and drinking milk. In Konoha's route, the early story focuses on the affection the protagonist shows towards Konoha, he takes on the role of her guardian. The latter part of the story focuses on the time they spend together, giving more insight into her personality and the father-daughter dynamic between them, as well as Konoha's internal struggle between whether to be a mother figure or be more childlike, as her outward appearance would suggest. She is shown doting on others throughout her route and is shown to have a penchant for alcohol in the evenings. In Kazuha's route, the story focuses on the protagonist's past. The history between the two races (humans and Mahoroi) is also elaborated on, and the origin of the Mahoroi is explained. The protagonist also teaches her to think more positively about life, as she is extremely worried about her Mahoroi powers being too weak. The characters also help her with her maid duties when she slips up.

The game also has three minor characters: Ehoku Minori (江北 実), Kouzu Iehisa (鴻洲 家久), and Kurishima Hoozuki (栗島 ほおずき). Minori is Seiji's classmate. She is described as mysterious and is always "on the edge of her seat". Ieshia becomes friends with Seiji after he moves into Seiji's school. He is described as "a handsome and sportsmanlike guy", but inside, he is not. Kurishima, although young-looking, is very mature. She is very serious and makes a good balance for the more laid-back Konoha.

== Development and release ==
Yorite Konoha wa Kurenai ni was developed by Lump of Sugar. The storyline of the game was written by Mizuki Satori, Tetsujin, and Yoshii Hajime, with art designs by Moekibara Fumitake and Kanade Nakoto.

Mizuki and Moekibara worked together on the creation of a light novel and Mizuki was satisfied with Moekibara's performance, so he wanted to work with him again for the development of the game. They were inspired by the opinions of users and staff during the development process. For example, Kemonomimi heroines is a theme that was added to the game after following the advice of users.

According to the producer, KawausoP, the concept of Yorite Konoha wa Kurenai ni is "coexistence and coprosperity between different species". The title is a metaphor for the story itself. Yo (縁; lit. 'destiny of two people') refers to the divine connection between protagonist and heroines, and Konoha wa Kurenai ni (此の葉は紅に; lit. 'this leaf turns red') refers to the character arc over the game, describing the characters as metaphorical leaves that change and mature over time.

Moekibara was able to design the characters of the game "freely". He drew the characters based on their "personality and atmosphere". In the interview, Moekibara described the background setting of Yorite Konoha wa Kurenai ni as "a mixture of Japanese traditions and modern culture", so he also designed the character's clothing based on this atmosphere. Moekibara gave Kazuha's maid costume as an example; he said that her costume was designed to a mix of Hakama and Apron. During another interview, Moekibara explained that they designed Kemonomimi of heroines to be fluffy so that they can fit with the atmosphere of game as a whole. They also paid attention to the animal features and the clothing of the heroines when it came to erotic scenes, he said that he looked for "the feeling of chaku-ero (着エロ, transl. non-nude erotica)".

The game was able to be pre-ordered on the Lump of Sugar website from August 25, 2017. They held a campaign for the customers who pre-ordered the game from August 25, 2017, to December 3, 2017, in which they were offered a poster with Momiji printed on it. Lump of Sugar first released a free trial of the game for download on November 24, 2017. Multiple talk shows and distribution meetings were held all over Japan until December 22, 2017, in which Yorite Konoha wa Kurenai ni related gifts being handed out.

The Download Edition, First Press Limited Edition, and Premium Edition of Yorite Konoha wa Kurenai ni were released by Lump of Sugar on January 26, 2018, compatible up to Windows 7/8.1/10. The Premium edition of the game was bundled with some gifts, such as a key case and calendar. Merchandise such as dakimakura covers and posters were also included as bonuses when customers bought the game from Sofmap and other shops. The regular edition was released on March 9, 2018. On December 25, 2020, a popular edition of the game was released, which had a lower price than other editions of the game. (Note: Originally, it was priced from 8,800 yen to 1,5800 yen, the popular edition was priced at 3,800 yen.)

== Music ==
External videos
- Akari no Arika by Kicco on YouTube

The opening theme of the game, Akari no Arika (アカリノアリカ), was created by Kokomi and Mizuno Daisuke, sung by Kicco. The full version of the song is not played during gameplay, but a CD containing the full version as well as other songs from the game was released with the game. A two CD original soundtrack album was also produced.

Yorite Konoha wa Kurenai ni Original Soundtrack Disc 1
No.	Title	Length
1.	"アカリノアリカ -Title ver.-"	3:51
2.	"継椛実サンライズ"	3:51
3.	"stupid fellow"	3:03
4.	"深淵の時"	2:43
5.	"すれ違い"	4:22
6.	"神気の法則"	4:14
7.	"STD -Super Tactical Dash-"	4:20
8.	"もみじのテーマ"	3:38
9.	"もみじのテーマ -minor ver.-"	3:58
10.	"もみじのテーマ -Piano Ver.-"	5:49
11.	"すずなのテーマ"	4:21
12.	"すずなのテーマ -minor ver.-"	5:44
13.	"すずなのテーマ -Piano Ver.-"	4:20
Total length:		54:14

Yorite Konoha wa Kurenai ni Original Soundtrack Disc 2
No.	Title	Length
1.	"小乃葉のテーマ"	4:27
2.	"小乃葉のテーマ -minor ver.-"	5:44
3.	"小乃葉のテーマ -Piano ver.-"	4:20
4.	"和羽のテーマ"	4:44
5.	"和羽のテーマ -minor ver.-"	3:59
6.	"和羽のテーマ -Piano Ver.-"	5:21
7.	"素直な想い"	4:50
8.	"Happy Time"	3:42
9.	"こころ花火"	5:47
10.	"夢のつづき"	3:58
11.	"Love Bites"	3:19
12.	"悠久の絆"	4:48
13.	"Departure"	2:32
Total length:		57:31

== Reception ==
On Getchu.com, a redistributor of visual novel and anime products, the first press limited edition and premium edition of the game ranked as the fifth and eighth best-selling bishōjo game for the month of its release. According to the Japanese magazines Megastore and BugBug, it was the best and second best-selling bishōjo game when it first appeared in the monthly ranking, respectively. (Note: BugBug, Megastore, and Getchu.com have different date ranges on the monthly ranking. In this case, the date range of BugBug is from the 16th of a month to the 15th of the next month. For Megastore, it is from the 11th of the month to the 10th of the next month. For Getchu.com, it is from the beginning of the month to the end of the month.) The game's soundtrack was ranked ninth in the Bishōjo Game Awards 2018 "Music Category".

Panzer Komori from TG Smart compared its setting to Tayutama: Kiss on my Deity before the release, and pointed out the selling points of the game are Kemonomimi heroines and computer graphics. He expected that the game would have a well-done love story and romantic atmosphere. He was also curious about whether the game would make the fans of Lump of Sugar happy because of the similar setting. Nekoko from BugBug published a positive review of the game. He wrote that the Kemonomimi heroines designed by Moekibara were "very cute" and considered Konoha's appearance, which he described as "childlike" and said she was his favourite character overall. Nekoko also praised the relationships between the characters, which he believes were all well portrayed.

When BugBug introduced Wakaba-iro no Quartet, another visual novel developed by Lump of Sugar, it noted that Moekibara's popularity was based on his performance on Tayutama and Yorite Konoha wa Kurenai ni.
