= Poibos Part 1 =

1983 video game

- Developer(s): ZAT-SOFT
- Publisher(s): Daimyo microcomputer academy
- Platform(s): NEC PC-6001, NEC PC-8001, NEC PC-8801, NEC PC-9801, FM-7, Sharp MZ, Sharp X1
- Release: JP: November 9, 1983
- Genre(s): Role-playing game
- Mode(s): Single-player

Poibos Part 1: Dasshutsu (ポイボスＰａｒｔ１ 脱出, lit. Poibos Part 1: Escape) is a sci-fi role-playing video game released by ZAT-SOFT for various computer platforms in Japan in 1983. It was originally developed on the premise of sequels, but only the first game was released. The planet name "Poibos" refers to the god Phoebus from Greek mythology, with simplified spelling for a Japanese audience. Poibos Part 1 is one of the first JRPGs ever created, and the first in a sci-fi setting.

== Plot ==
The Dark Galactic Emperor invaded Poibos and destroyed almost the entire population. The few survivors were imprisoned on the planet Kurane belonging to Empire. One of them, our main protagonist Jorg, managed to escape. He needs to find the seven surviving Holy Men and try to resurrect Poibos.

== Gameplay ==
Poibos Part 1 is a standard early party RPG with tiled map, turn-based battles and random encounters.
