= Sora o Tobu, Mittsu no Hōhō. =

Japanese adult visual novel developed by La'cryma

- Sora o Tobu, Mittsu no Hōhō. logo

空を飛ぶ、3つの方法。 (Three Ways to Fly in the Sky)
- Genre: Drama, Romance
- Manga
- Written by: La'cryma
- Illustrated by: Kinusa Shimotsuki
- Published by: Kadokawa Shoten
- Magazine: Comp Ace
- Original run: November 26, 2007 – present
- Volumes: 2
- Video game
- Developer: La'cryma
- Publisher: La'cryma
- Genre: Eroge, Visual novel
- Platform: Windows
- Released: July 25, 2008 (PC, limited edition); August 20, 2008 (PC, regular edition)

Sora o Tobu, Mittsu no Hōhō. (空を飛ぶ、3つの方法。; lit. Three Ways to Fly in the Sky, commonly abbreviated as Soramitsu (そらみつ)) is a Japanese adult visual novel developed by La'cryma. It was released on July 25, 2008, for Windows as a limited edition DVD. The gameplay in Soramitsu follows a linear plot line, which offers predetermined scenarios and courses of interaction, and focuses on the appeal of the female main characters.

Soramitsu has also been adapted into other media. Before the game's release, a manga adaptation based on the visual novel illustrated by Japanese illustrator Kinusa Shimotsuki was serialized in the seinen manga magazine Comp Ace published by Kadokawa Shoten on November 26, 2007.

== Gameplay ==
The gameplay in Soramitsu requires little interaction from the player, as most of the duration of the game is only spent on reading the text that appears on the screen, representing either dialogue between characters, or the inner thoughts of the protagonist. Occasionally, the player will come to a point where he or she is given the chance to choose from a list of options that are displayed on the screen, typically two to three at a time. During these times, the gameplay pauses until the player makes a decision, which effectively furthers the plot. There are multiple plot lines that the player may experience. To view all of the plot lines, the player must replay the game multiple times and make different choices to progress the plot in an alternate direction. One of the goals of the gameplay is for the player to view the hentai scenes depicting the protagonist and the heroines having sexual intercourse, in addition to the game's story.

== Development ==
Soramitsu was first announced to the public at Broccoli's 2007 content lineup media conference as the second project of the visual novel studio La'cryma, a collaboration among visual novel studios Broccoli and Circus. Unlike its predecessor True Tears, neither visual novel studio GameCrab nor Japanese illustrator Rei Izumi were involved with the project. Instead, the position of scenario writer was given to Yū Kamiya, who has also planned the project, while the position of art director and character designer was given to Hirō Ōgi, with additional art design by Masato Mizuki, Haruki Kazami, and Yuki Takano.

=== Release history ===
Soramitsu was first available to the public as a free game demo which was first released on March 21, 2008, in the May issue of the Japanese magazine Tech Gian, followed by an online release on May 2, 2008. Soramitsu was originally announced to be released on May 30, 2008, but was later delayed, and released on July 25, 2008, for the PC as a limited edition, and was later followed by a standard edition release on August 20, 2008.

== Adaptations ==
=== Manga ===
Before the game's release, Soramitsu was adapted into a manga series, illustrated by Japanese illustrator Kinusa Shimotsuki. It was first serialized in the seinen manga magazine Comp Ace, published by Kadokawa Shoten, on November 26, 2007. The first bound volume was released on July 10, 2008.
