= Tenshin Ranman: Lucky or Unlucky!? =

Japanese visual novel

- Original Tenshin Ranman visual novel cover. Clockwise: Ruri (top right), Sana, Aoi, and Unohana.

天神乱漫 LUCKY or UNLUCKY!?
- Genre: Fantasy, Harem, Romance
- Audio drama

Tenshin Ranman: Original mini-drama
- Produced by: Yuzusoft
- Original run: February 6, 2009 – March 19, 2009
- Episodes: 4
- Manga
- Written by: Yuzusoft
- Illustrated by: Aya Yamabuki
- Published by: ASCII Media Works
- Imprint: Dengeki Comics
- Magazine: Dengeki G's Festival! Comic
- Original run: April 25, 2009 – October 26, 2011
- Volumes: 2
- Video game
- Developer: Yuzusoft
- Publisher: Yuzusoft (PC); Russell (PSP)
- Genre: Eroge, Visual novel
- Engine: KiriKiri
- Platform: PC, PlayStation Portable
- Released: JP: May 29, 2009 (PC); JP: March 25, 2010 (PSP)
- Light novel

Tenshin Ranman ~ Natsu no Yoru no Waru Yume ~
- Written by: Itoi Ken'ichi
- Illustrated by: Muririn (cover); Satoru Arikawa
- Published by: Harvest
- Imprint: Nagomi Bunko
- Published: January 1, 2010
- Volumes: 1

Tenshin Ranman: Lucky or Unlucky!? (天神乱漫 -LUCKY or UNLUCKY!?-) is a Japanese adult visual novel developed by Yuzusoft, and released for the PC on May 29, 2009. The game was later ported to the PlayStation Portable console by Russell on March 25, 2010, under the title Tenshin Ranman - Happy Go Lucky!!. The gameplay in Tenshin Ranman follows a plot line which offers pre-determined scenarios with courses of interaction, and focuses on the appeal of the four female main characters. The story revolves around Haruki Chitose, the very unfortunate protagonist, and older brother of Sana Chitose. One day, he receives a parcel containing something he would never have thought.

Before the game's release, a Tenshin Ranman web radio program was broadcast in Japan on radio station Onsen. Five character image songs, one for each heroine, were produced by Yuzusoft from February 6, 2009, to March 19, 2009. Each character CD came with a different mini drama. A manga was serialized in ASCII Media Works' Dengeki G's Festival! Comic, and later released in two tankōbon volumes. There has also been a light novel adaptation published by Harvest.

In 2015, Sekai Project announced an official English localization of Tenshin Ranman.

== Gameplay ==
Tenshin Ranman is a romance visual novel in which the player assumes the role of Haruki Chitose. Much of its gameplay is spent reading the text that appears on the screen, which represents the story's narrative and dialogue. The text is accompanied by character sprites, which represent who Haruki is talking to, over background art. Throughout the game, the player encounters CG artwork at certain points in the story, which take the place of the background art and character sprites. The game follows a branching plot line with multiple endings, and depending on the decisions that the player makes during the game, the plot will progress in a specific direction.

There are four main (with two unlockable plots for the sub-heroine) plot lines that the player will have the chance to experience, one for each of the heroines in the story. Throughout gameplay, the player is given multiple options to choose from, and text progression pauses at these points until a choice is made. Some decisions can lead the game to end prematurely and offer an alternative ending to the plot. To view all plot lines in their entirety, the player will have to replay the game multiple times and choose different choices to further the plot to an alternate direction. Throughout gameplay, there are scenes depicting Haruki and a given heroine having sexual intercourse, however, these sexual scenes are removed in the PlayStation Portable version. The PlayStation Portable also add two new heroine of the game.

== Plot ==
=== Story ===
Haruki Chitose lives with his younger sister Sana Chitose, and at first glance, seems like an ordinary guy, however, he is extremely unfortunate to a degree. Eventually he accepts it as a part of his daily life. One day, Haruki receives a parcel with the only words written on it: "creature". This turns out to be a goddess who has come to remove his misfortune, and starts to live in the Chitose household. Sana does not approve of this, and several other characters get involved.

=== Main characters ===
Haruki Chitose (千歳 春樹, Chitose Haruki)
The main protagonist. He is extremely unlucky, causing him to come to terms with this and accept this as a daily routine. He is rather cold, though he does show his soft side from time to time. His younger sister is Sana Chitose.

Unohana no Sakuya Hime (卯花之佐久夜姫)
Voiced by: Maya Takashi (PC) / Shizuka Itō (PSP)
Unohana is a goddess who came delivered to the Chitose residence in a parcel, with the intention of removing Haruki's bad luck. She starts to live with him. Unohana is very talented, likes to read manga, and flirts with Haruki a lot.

Ruri Rindou (竜胆 ルリ, Rindou Ruri)
Voiced by: Mia Naruse (PC/PSP)
A fox-eared girl who serves Unohana. She loves sweets, and will often attempt to bite Haruki, to his dismay. Ruri also has a habit of smelling people.

Sana Chitose (千歳 佐奈, Chitose Sana)
Voiced by: Oto Agumi (PC) / Mai Goto (PSP)
Sana is Haruki's younger sister. She is gentle and kind, but gets jealous easily. She is especially good at doing housework such as cooking and laundry. Sana is not actually blood related to Haruki.

Aoi Yamabuki (山吹 葵, Yamabuki Aoi)
Voiced by: Fūri Samoto (PC/PSP)
Hiroki's outgoing childhood friend. Aoi is very popular at school, due to her looks and personality. She tries to be helpful to Haruki, by giving him lucky charms in order to try to get rid of the bad luck. She is Wataru's younger sister.

== Media ==
=== Printed media ===
A manga adaptation was serialized in the Dengeki G's Festival! Comic magazine between April 2009 and October 2011 issues. Two tankōbon volumes were published in Japan by ASCII Media Works, under their Dengeki Comics imprint. The manga was illustrated by Aya Yamabuki.

A light novel called "Tenshin Ranman ~ Natsu no Yoru no Waru Yume ~" (天神乱漫〜夏の夜の悪夢〜) was published by Harvest under their Nagomi Bunko imprint on January 1, 2010. It was written by Itoi Ken'ichi, and illustrated by artist Satoru Arikawa, the cover was illustrated by Muririn.

=== Web radio and character CDs ===
A web radio directed by Niji, called "Tenshin Ranman! Ōra no Taki! 〜Maina Suion ga Detemasu yo〜" (天神乱漫! オーラの滝! 〜まいなすイオンがでてますよ〜) was hosted on radio station Onsen. The show broadcast from January 6, 2009, to July 7, 2009. It is hosted by voice actress Yui Sakakibara. A total of fourteen broadcasts were made.

Five character image songs, one for each heroine, were produced by Yuzusoft. Unohana's character song, titled "Charge of Soul", was released on February 6, 2009. Ruri's character song, titled "Chīsana Negai" (小さな願い, Small Wish), was released on February 20, 2009. Sana's character song, titled "With You!!", was released on March 6, 2009. Lastly, Aoi's character song, titled "Mottō" (モットー, More), was released on March 19, 2009. Each character CD comes with a mini-drama.

== Reception ==
On Getchu.com, a major redistributor of visual novel and domestic anime products, Tenshin Ranman was ranked as the second most widely sold game of May 2009, the month and year of the visual novel's release, only falling behind Tayutama: It's Happy Days, which ranked first. The visual novel made another appearance in the charts, ranking No. 11 in June 2009 on Getchu.com. Tenshin Ranman was ranked as the third most widely sold game in the first half of 2009, on Getchu.com. The visual novel was also voted as the overall most recommended visual novel to play as of May 2009.
