= Hello, Good-bye =

2010 video game

ハローグッドバイ (Harō Guddobai)
- Genre: Action, Drama, Historical fiction, Romance
- Video game
- Developer: Lump of Sugar
- Publisher: Lump of Sugar
- Genre: Eroge, Visual novel
- Platform: Windows
- Released: JP: December 17, 2010
- Manga

Lump of Comic: HGB
- Written by: Lump of Sugar
- Illustrated by: Fumitake Moekibara
- Published by: Enterbrain
- Published: April 2011
- Audio drama

Hello, Good-bye: To You the Commonplace Miracle
- Produced by: Marine Entertainment
- Written by: Lump of Sugar
- Released: August 12, 2011

Hello, Good-bye (ハローグッドバイ, Harō Guddobai) is a Japanese adult visual novel developed and published by Lump of Sugar. It was released on December 17, 2010, for Windows as Lump of Sugar's sixth title. A trial edition was released in October 2010 rated for all ages. The primary focus of the game is the appeal of the four female main characters. The story revolves around the protagonist, Kaito Toubu, a secret agent tasked with infiltrating the demilitarised territory of Morino in an alternate universe Japan.

In April 2011, an official fan book was published by Enterbrain, which contained a Hello, Good-bye four-panel manga titled Lump of Comic: HGB illustrated by Fumitake Moekibara, who also provided the illustrations and character designs for the game. In August 2011, a Hello, Good-bye drama CD was produced by Marine Entertainment.

== Gameplay ==
An example of the gameplay in Hello, Good-bye, the image depicts the protagonist Kaito Toubu having a conversation with Suguri (left), May (center), and Natsume (right).

Hello, Good-bye is romance visual novel in which the player assumes the role of Kaito Toubu. Much of its gameplay is spent on reading the story's narrative and dialogue. The text in the game is accompanied by character sprites, which represent who Kaito is talking to, over background art. Throughout the game, the player encounters CG artwork at certain points in the story, which take the place of the background art and character sprites. Hello, Good-bye follows a branching plot line with multiple endings, and depending on the decisions that the player makes during the game, the plot will progress in alternative directions.

There are four main plot lines that the player will have the chance to experience, one for each of the four heroines: May Yukishiro, Suguri Saotome, Natsume Rindo, and Koharu Hiiragi. Throughout gameplay, the player is given multiple options to choose from, and text progression pauses at these points until a choice is made. Some decisions can lead the game to end prematurely, which offers an alternative ending to the plot. To view all plot lines in their entirety, the player will have to replay the game multiple times and choose different choices to further the plot in an alternate direction. Hello, Good-bye also features an achievement system. Once the player has accomplished all the tasks or completed the routes, they will receive the privilege of having a glossary of terms from the game and their definitions, background CG and music libraries, a sprite viewer, and even an additional minigame starring the Lump of Sugar mascot, Azrael. There are scenes with sexual CGs depicting Kaito and a given heroine having sex.

== Plot ==
=== Setting ===
In Japan, there are two conflicting factions, The United Provinces of Japan (日本合州国) in the west and The Federation of Japan (日本連邦) in the east. Despite them still opposing each other, they have made a temporary suspension of fighting known as The Morino Ceasefire Treaty (守乃特別区). This treaty has existed for at least a century, and many have decided to worship it. The story is set at the Cathedral School (天主堂学院), a catholic school located on an island that provides education from kindergarten to university. Sister Therese teaches history there.

=== Main characters ===
Kaito Toubu (東武 カイト, Toubu Kaito)
Voiced by: Junji Majima (drama CD)
Kaito Toubu is the protagonist, and a secret agent undercover whose job is to infiltrate the neutral grounds of Morino and gather intelligence for the United Provinces of Japan. His training as a soldier enables him to think calmly and rationally about things. He can see déjà vu. He is affiliated with The United Provinces of Japan, and his related arcana is The Fool.

May Yukishiro (雪代 メイ, Yukishiro May)
Voiced by: Ryoka Yuzuki
May Yukishiro is one of the heroines in the story, and the first to be met by Kaito. She is a sweet, kind, and sometimes rather clumsy girl, but tends to be slow at times. This is due to her innocent and caring nature. In the beginning, May is willing to help Kaito as much as she can, since she is always kind and helpful, especially to uncivilized people. She is oblivious to many things, making her a naive person. May is very calm and reserved most of the time. Taking care of flowers seems to be one of her hobbies, as she is first seen by Kaito looking after lilies blooming on a hill. Her route in the game focuses on unraveling the truth about Kaito. She is affiliated with The United Provinces of Japan, and her related arcana is The Empress.

Suguri Saotome (早乙女 すぐり, Saotome Suguri)
Voiced by: Yuko Goto
Suguri Saotome is also a heroine in the story, the second heroine met by Kaito. She is best friends with May and is just as kind and helpful as her, but is more of a tomboy. She is an outgoing, high-spirited girl despite her tsundere appearance. In the beginning, she accidentally mistakes Kaito for her childhood friend and then pulverizes him for it. She is affiliated with The Morino Ceasefire Treaty, and her related arcana is The Star.

Natsume Rindo (竜胆 棗, Rindo Natsume)
Voiced by: Akiko Yajima
Natsume Rindo is another one of the heroines in the story, and the third heroine to be met by Kaito. At the beginning of the story, she is a transfer student. At first, she seems to be a serious, and simply put, a very well-behaved girl, but she is actually an innocent girl who is easily embarrassed by romance and the like. It is shown that Natsume has an extreme fondness for sweets. She is affiliated with The Federation of Japan, and her related arcana is Judgment.

Koharu Hiiragi (柊 コハル, Hiiragi Koharu)
Voiced by: Mai Kadowaki
Koharu Hiiragi is the fourth and final heroine in the story. She is a mysterious, small-statured girl who insists she is Kaito's imouto (younger sister). Koharu's favorite food is meat. She is affiliated with The Morino Ceasefire Treaty, and her related arcana is Wheel of Fortune.

=== Minor characters ===
Munenori Iwashimizu (岩清水 宗典, Iwashimizu Munenori)
Voiced by: Kōta
Munenori Iwashimizu is a perverted classmate of Kaito's. He wears glasses, and his related arcana is The Magician.

Sister Therese (シスター・テレーズ, Shisutā Terēzu)
Voiced by: Hina Nakase
Sister Therese works in a church, and is also a teacher teaching history in a catholic school called Cathedral School, and her related arcana is Tempelance.

Shidō Kiritake (桐竹 士道, Kiritake Shidō)
Voiced by: Takaya Kuroda
Shidō is a retired, elderly man who is referred to as 'uncle' by May. He is the foster parent of Kaito.

Woman Operator (オペレーター, Operētā)
A woman operator whose real name is unknown.

== Development and release ==
Hello, Good-bye is Lump of Sugar's sixth game. The scenario was written by Tetsujin. Character design and art direction were headed by Fumitake Moekibara. Hello, Good-bye's music was composed by Shigenobu Ōkawa and Yūta Yamaguchi. The videos featured in the game were produced by RMG, and the animation in the game was produced by Silver Link. A trial edition, rated for all ages, was released by Lump of Sugar in Japan on October 16, 2010. The full, adult game was released on December 17, 2010, for Windows as a limited-edition version. The trial and limited edition are fully voiced. Promotional videos were released commercially, with four different versions featuring one of the four heroines in Hello, Good-bye: May, Suguri, Natsume, or Koharu.

== Related media ==
=== Printed media ===
Enterbrain published a 144-page visual fan book was on April 1, 2011. The fan book contains a terminology dictionary, story and character introductions, interviews, autographs, an illustration gallery, comments from staff, and a short four-panel manga titled Lump of Comic: HGB, which can also be read online. The manga is illustrated by Fumitake Moekibara. The Hello, Good-bye characters are designed to give the appearance of chibis in the comic strips.

=== Music and audio CDs ===
Marine Entertainment released a spin-off drama CD titled To You the Commonplace Miracle (ありふれた奇跡をあなたへ, Arifureta Kiseki o Anata e) on August 12, 2011, written by Lump of Sugar. The drama CD features an episode called "School Festival".

The opening theme for Hello, Good-bye is "Goodbye Crisis" (グッバイ クライシス, Gubbai Kuraishisu) by Masami Okui, with lyrics written by Trinity, and arrangement by Macaroni☆. The ending theme "Unnamed Place" (無名ぷれす, Mumei Puresu) is by Haruka Shimotsuki, with lyrics by Mao Sumita. The opening and ending themes were released on two separate CDs, also containing the instrumental versions of the two songs. Hello, Good-bye contains three insert songs. The first is "Namonaki Monogatari" (名も無き物語) by Kicco, with lyrics by Akko and composition by Kan Sayuri. The second is "Watashi wa Anata o Shinjiteiru" (私はあなたを信じている, I Believe in You) by Tohko, with lyrics by YoshiShina. The third is "Bokura no Machi" (ぼくらのまち, Our Town) by Riyu Kosaka, with lyrics by Takanori Mizoguchi and composition by Yoichi Sakai. A two-disc original soundtrack was also produced.

Hello, Good-bye Original Soundtrack Disc 1
No.	Title	Length
1.	"She is a Kind Girl"	3:02
2.	"I'll Remember You"	3:21
3.	"My Place"	3:55
4.	"I Meet You"	3:28
5.	"I Say Hello"	3:48
6.	"You Say Good-bye"	4:31
7.	"Where Shall We Go?"	4:43
8.	"Matter"	4:27
9.	"Occurring"	4:52
10.	"Stillness"	3:50
11.	""You" and "I""	3:39
12.	"Magic Bullet Shooter"	3:49
13.	"En Folkefiende"	2:43
14.	"Who Killed Cock Robin?"	3:41
15.	"Bygone Days"	4:19
Total length:		58:08

Hello, Good-bye Original Soundtrack Disc 2
No.	Title	Length
1.	"Together, Again"	4:55
2.	"A Hard Day's…"	3:11
3.	"A Mad Tea-Party"	4:18
4.	"So Beautiful"	4:52
5.	"Imagine"	4:34
6.	"Namonaki Monogatari"	4:30
7.	"That's Not Bad"	4:16
8.	"Indiscretion "No""	3:47
9.	"Ceiling Painting "Yes""	3:30
10.	"In Paradisum"	3:07
11.	"So darling…"	3:58
12.	"Interval"	2:59
13.	"Sanbi no Ikenie to Inori o, Aruiwa Tsuitō Suru Sono Tamashī e no Awaremi o"	4:24
14.	"Briefing"	2:52
15.	"Bet Your Life!"	3:48
Total length:		59:01

=== Merchandise ===
Merchandise has been produced for Hello, Good-bye, including figurines produced by Volks Inc., special stick posters, rough line art books, desktop accessories, Hello, Good-bye school attire cosplay, bed sheets, pillow cases, and booklets regarding the game. There are also collectible Lump of Sugar trading cards that depict the characters from their existing visual novels, including Hello, Good-bye.

== Reception ==
Hello, Good-bye was the sixth best selling visual novel in 2010 on Getchu, and was the number one best selling visual novel of December 2010 sold on Getchu. In January 2011, the ranking lowered to 20th place. Hello, Good-bye was ranked first as the most pre-ordered visual novel game in Japan in November 2010. Getchu.com awarded Hello, Good-bye first place for the visual novel with the best quality movie-making in 2010. Moe Game Award gave Hello, Good-bye silver (second place) for the best visual novel song in 2011, which was "Goodbye Crisis" sung by Masami Okui, losing only to Grisaia no Kajitsu which achieved gold. On Hello, Good-bye's official website, a popularity poll was held for the characters. May Yukishiro came in fourth place with 2,092 votes, Natsume Rindo came in third place with 2,179 votes, Suguri Saotome came in second place with 2,306 votes, and Koharu Hiiragi came in first place with 2,317 votes. Koharu then received a special wallpaper as a prize.

On reviewing the English-language version, Thomas Knight of NookGaming praised the artwork and enjoyed all of the routes, but criticized how quickly the relationships with the heroines developed.
