= Noriko Rikimaru =

Japanese voice actress and narrator

Noriko Rikimaru (力丸 乃りこ, Rikimaru Noriko, born January 20, 1976) is a Japanese voice actress and narrator.

== Notable voice roles ==
- Class President – My Bride is a Mermaid
- Sister Claire – Chrono Crusade
- Elie's Mother – Groove Adventure Rave
- Asuka Shiratori – Izumo: Takeki Tsurugi no Senki
- Sugimoto – Jigoku Shōjo
- Tetsuko Hongo – Magikano
- Nori Sakurada – Rozen Maiden
- Manaka Komaki – To Heart 2
- Holly – Viewtiful Joe
- Mito Mashiro – Tayutama
- Kukuri Tachibana – 11eyes
- Patchouli Knowledge, Luna Child – Koumajou Densetsu II: Stranger's Requiem, Koumajou Remilia: Scarlet Symphony
- Miu Amaha – Mashiroiro Symphony
- Sarah Jerand – Star Ocean: The Last Hope
- Chiyo and Chinatsu - Swing Out Sisters
