= Fan disc =

Video game distribution

A fan disc (sometimes called fandisk or simply abbreviated as FD) is a package of additional content, usually released by a game company after the successful launch of one of its titles. The contents of fan discs varies, but often includes new images, music, minigames and miscellaneous information related to the original game.

Eroge visual novels, such as Popotan, frequently receive fan discs. Since most visual novels depict standalone stories, rarely warranting sequels, this particular genre notoriously employs fan discs as a medium to explore pre-established settings and profit from the original game's popularity. Sometimes, a fan disc is made as a compilation of two separate, but similar games, aiming to serve as a link between them (the Come See Me Tonight series being an example).

Tsukihime's PLUS-disc translation by mirror moon, MangaGamer's first official English translation of the Edelweiss fan disc, Edelweiss Eiden Fantasia, and Jutsuki Sen & Co.'s partial patch of Muv-Luv: Altered Fable are notable examples of high-quality projects dedicated to make fan discs accessible to audiences unfamiliar with the Japanese language.

== See also ==
- Expansion pack
- Downloadable content
- Original video animation
