= Tayutama: Kiss on my Deity =

Japanese visual novel, released 2008

- Tayutama: Kiss on my Deity visual novel cover

タユタマ -Kiss on my Deity-
- Genre: Drama, Fantasy, Romance, Harem
- Video game
- Developer: Lump of Sugar
- Publisher: Lump of Sugar (Windows); 5pb. (Xbox 360)
- Genre: Eroge, Visual novel
- Platform: Windows, Xbox 360
- Released: JP: July 11, 2008 (Windows); JP: November 5, 2009 (Xbox 360)
- Manga
- Written by: Yūya
- Illustrated by: Yukiwo
- Published by: Kadokawa Shoten
- Magazine: Comp Ace
- Original run: January 2009 – July 2009
- Volumes: 1
- Anime television series
- Directed by: Keitaro Motonaga
- Produced by: Tatsuhiro Nitta; Tsukuru Maruyama; Eiji Mannō; Michiko Koyanagi
- Written by: Makoto Uezu
- Music by: Shigenobu Ōkawa; Yutaka Minobe
- Studio: Silver Link
- Licensed by: NA: Sentai Filmworks
- Original network: Chiba TV, TV Kanagawa
- Original run: April 5, 2009 – June 21, 2009
- Episodes: 12
- Video game

Tayutama: It's Happy Days
- Developer: Lump of Sugar
- Publisher: Lump of Sugar
- Genre: Eroge, Visual novel
- Platform: Windows
- Released: JP: May 29, 2009
- Video game

Tayutama 2: You're the Only One
- Developer: Lump of Sugar
- Publisher: Lump of Sugar
- Genre: Eroge, Visual novel
- Platform: Windows
- Released: JP: September 23, 2016

Tayutama: Kiss on my Deity (タユタマ -Kiss on my Deity-) is a Japanese visual novel developed by Lump of Sugar. It was first released as an adult game for Windows PCs on July 11, 2008, in both limited and regular editions, and was later followed by an Xbox 360 version. Tayutama is Lump of Sugar's third title after their previous titles Nursery Rhyme and Itsuka, Todoku, Ano Sora ni. The story centers on the male protagonist Yuri Mito, a high school student who is the son of a family that presides over the local Shinto shrine. As Yuri performs a ritual to transfer a relic that hosts a fictional, supernatural race called Tayutai, he and his friends accidentally summon a goddess, who incarnates as a young girl.

The gameplay in Tayutama mainly consists of reading a text-based, branching plot line with multiple endings, and offers pre-determined scenarios and courses of interaction based on the player's decisions. The game received two awards from the 2008 Bishōjo Game Awards for its visuals. It received a fan disc titled Tayutama: It's Happy Days in May 2009, and made several transitions to other media. It received a manga adaptation illustrated by artist Yukiwo, who co-created an original story for the adaptation. A twelve-episode anime series produced by the animation studio Silver Link was broadcast in Japan between April and June 2009. A manga anthology series drawn by multiple artists, an Internet radio talk show used to promote the anime adaptation, and several music albums were also released.

== Gameplay ==
A conversation in Tayutama depicting the protagonist Yuri talking to Yumina (pictured).

Tayutama is a romance visual novel in which the player assumes the role of Yuri Mito. Its gameplay mainly consists of reading and progressing through the story's narrative and dialogue. The game's text is accompanied by character sprites, which represent who Yuri is talking to, appearing on top of background artwork. Throughout the game, the player encounters CG artwork at certain points in the story, which take the place of the regular background art and character sprites. When the game is completed at least once, a gallery of the viewed CGs and played background music is available on the game's title screen. Tayutama follows a branching plot line with nonlinear sequences and multiple endings, where the plot's direction is affected by the player's decisions.

Throughout gameplay, the player is given multiple options to choose from, and text progression pauses at these points until a decision is made. These decisions determine the sequence in which the story's events will occur, and progress the plot toward a specific heroine's ending. There are four main plot lines in the original Windows version that the player will have the chance to experience, one for each of the heroines in the story. This is increased to five plot lines in the Xbox 360 version with the extended scenario for Nue. In order to view all plot lines in their entirety, the player will have to replay the game multiple times and make different decisions to progress the plot in alternate directions.

== Plot ==
Sosei Academy as seen in Tayutama. Slightly's school building is seen to the left, while Flawless' school building is seen to the right.

=== Setting and themes ===
The main part of Tayutama takes place in a town called Ashihara-chō (葦原町), which houses various landmarks such as the Sosei Academy (創聖学院, Sōsei Gakuin), which the main characters attend, and the Yachimata Shrine (八衢神社, Yachimata Jinja), a local Shinto shrine managed by Yuri's family. Sosei Academy consists of two departments: a notorious all-girls department named Flawless (フローレス, Furōresu), which stems its roots from the Sosei Girls' Academy; and a recently added coeducation department named Slightly (スライトリー, Suraitorii). The campus grounds are separated into two parts which houses the two separate departments. Students attending the Flawless department live in a dormitory across from the school building, which is separated from Slightly's school building and schoolyard by a small forest.

Supernatural phenomena are a recurring theme in Tayutama. The fictional, mythological race Tayutai (太転依) is worshiped by the Yachimata Shrine, and its members are able to take shape in various forms, including humans. Various characters also possess supernatural abilities, such as Yuri who excels in Shinto studies and practices, and Mashiro, who is a Tayutai herself. Yumina and Ameri both receive wings as a result of gaining the favor and allying respectively with Houou and Ouryu, two Tayutai. Mifuyu is befriended by Nue, another Tayutai, and is physically powerful enough to engage a Tayutai in battle.

=== Principal characters ===
The player assumes the role of Yuri Mito (泉戸 裕理, Mito Yūri; voiced by Satoshi Hino), the protagonist of Tayutama. Yuri comes from a family that presides over the Yachimata Shrine, and holds a vast knowledge in Shinto practices. He takes an interest in automobile maintenance, and also aspires to be an auto mechanic or designer. Mashiro Mito (泉戸 ましろ, Mito Mashiro; voiced by Noriko Rikimaru), the main heroine of Tayutama, is a Tayutai girl with a high understanding of spiritual powers. She is the incarnation of the goddess Kikuramikami no Hime (綺久羅美守毘売; voiced by Haruka Nagami), and wishes for a mutual harmony between humans and Tayutai. She falls in love with Yuri soon after being left in his care, to the extent that she claims to be his wife.

Several characters also become involved in Yuri and Mashiro's attempt to create a world where both humans and Tayutai can coexist together. Ameri Kawai (河合 アメリ, Kawai Ameri; voiced by Asami Shimoda), another heroine, is Yuri's energetic and outgoing childhood friend. She frequently carries around candies, which she often shares with others, and has a crush towards Yuri, but is unable to carry her feelings further. Yumina Takanashi (小鳥遊 ゆみな, Takanashi Yumina; voiced by Kaori Mizuhashi), also a heroine, is Yuri's stepsister who resided with his family until their mother's death. She is often shy and quiet in front of others, and takes an interest in activities such as drawing and cooking. Yumina transfers into Flawless early in the story, and often voluntarily takes care of the household chores for Yuri's family. Mifuyu Kisaragi (如月 美冬, Kisaragi Mifuyu; voiced by Shizuka Itō), the last of Tayutama's heroines, is an honor student from Flawless. She is calm and intelligent, and tends to act as an elder sister figure to other Flawless students. She is skilled in various martial arts, and is in particular proficient in kenjutsu.

=== Story ===
The story of Tayutama revolves around the male protagonist Yuri Mito, whose family manages the local Shinto shrine. One day during spring break, Yuri and his friends Ameri Kawai and Sankurou Kaname find in the school's woods a mysterious relic that was used in the past to seal the Tayutai, an ancient, mythological race. Yuri discovers that the school board has determined that the relic is insignificant for preservation, and that it will be demolished to allow the school to expand. After coming to the conclusion that destroying the relic may have adverse consequences, the trio attempts to relocate the relic's spirits. As Yuri performs the ritual, he summons Kikuramikami no Hime, a Tayutai goddess who explains to him the belligerent relationship between humans and Tayutai; Kikuramikami then incarnates as a young girl, Mashiro, in hopes of maintaining a mutual relationship with humans. Shortly afterwards, the relic is destroyed in an accident, releasing the entire race of Tayutai. Among them are Nue, Houou, and Ouryu, three influential Tayutai who hold humans in low regard and are referred to collectively as the "Three Mightiest" (三強, Sankyō). Following the incident, Yuri takes Mashiro to the Yachimata Shrine to live with his family, and later finds Mashiro as a teenager, who proclaims herself to be Yuri's wife.

In their attempt to create a world where humans and Tayutai can peacefully coexist, Yuri and Mashiro battle the members of the Three Mightiest in a successive, nonlinear order determined by the player's decisions. In one scenario, Nue, a young female Tayutai, begins to steal undergarments from the Flawless dormitories due to her curiosity in them. She is defeated by Mashiro and Mifuyu Kisaragi, and finds herself befriended by Mifuyu, who later begins to take care of her as a guardian. Yumina Takanashi, Yuri's stepsister, also begins to take care of Hou, an exhausted bird Tayutai who begins to nest on Yumina's head. Yumina is later attacked by Ou, another Tayutai who makes up the Houou couple with Hou, before the couple reconciles with the help of Yuri and Mashiro. Lastly, Ameri allies herself with Ouryu, the last of the Three Mightiest, out of jealousy from the amount of attention Mashiro receives from Yuri. After Ameri reconciles with Yuri, Ouryu agrees to stop attacking humans, and acknowledges Mashiro's goal.

== Development and release ==
Tayutama is the third title developed by Lump of Sugar. The visual novel's scenario was written by Chihiro Fumikata. The character designs and illustrations for the visual novel were drawn by Fumitake Moekibara; Moekibara also served the same position for Lump of Sugar's previous titles. The game's music was composed entirely by Shigenobu Ōkawa, who was also one of the two composers for Itsuka, Todoku, Ano Sora ni.

Tayutama was first released for Windows on July 11, 2008, in both limited and regular editions. The limited edition contained the game itself, a vocal collection CD, an official fan book, character portraits, and a phone strap; the regular edition did not contain the aforementioned extras. A fan disc of Tayutama, titled Tayutama: It's Happy Days, was released on May 29, 2009, in both limited and regular editions. The limited edition of It's Happy Days contained the game itself and a visual fan book with short summaries of the game's characters, illustrations, conception materials, and an interview with the game's development team. 5pb. released an Xbox 360 version of the original game on November 5, 2009. The Xbox 360 version contains remastered graphics, additional music, and additional scenarios for Nue, a supporting female character being promoted to a heroine. It was released in both limited and regular editions, and the limited edition contains the game itself, a phone strap, and a drama CD adaptation.

A sequel titled Tayutama 2: You're the Only One was announced on April 24, 2015, to commemorate Lump of Sugar's 10th anniversary and released on September 23, 2016. The game was submitted to Steam Greenlight by Chinese publisher Hikari Field on September 15, 2016. An append disc for Tayutama 2, featuring the characters of Tayutama, was released to users who purchased Lump of Sugar's previous titles, Rensō Relation and Kodomo no Asobi.

== Adaptations ==
=== Printed media ===
A manga adaptation based on Tayutama was serialized between the January and July 2009 issues of the manga magazine Comp Ace. The manga series was drawn by illustrator Yukiwo and written by Yūya, and features an original story in which Yuri becomes a girl. The individual chapters were later compiled into a single bound volume published by Kadokawa Shoten on June 26, 2009. Enterbrain published a series of four-panel comic strip anthologies, titled Magi-Cu 4-koma Tayutama: Kiss on my Deity. The anthology series spanned four volumes, and it was released under Enterbrain's Magi-Cu Comics imprint between April 25 and October 26, 2009. The contents of the anthologies were drawn by numerous artists, and eighteen different illustrators contributed to the first volume.

An art book titled Tayutama: Kiss on my Deity Official Book was released with the game's limited edition release on July 11, 2008. The book included content such as sketches of the characters and staff comments. A 112-page visual fan book for the fan disc, Tayutama: It's Happy Days, was first released with the game's limited edition release on May 29, 2009; it was also released separately on January 22, 2010. The book contains content such as illustrations and computer graphic artwork from the game, development materials, and staff interviews.

=== Anime ===
A Tayutama anime adaptation was first announced in Enterbrain's Tech Gian magazine on December 20, 2008. The anime series was produced by Silver Link, directed by Keitaro Motonaga and written by Makoto Uezu. The anime was first exhibited as a video at Media Factory's Spring Anime Festival in the Ryōgoku KFC Hall in Tokyo, on March 29, 2009. The exhibition featured a public showing of the anime's first episode along with Phantom: Requiem for the Phantom and Queen's Blade's respective episodes, and also talk shows featuring voice actors from the three series. The anime was first broadcast in Japan between April 5 and June 21, 2009, on the Chiba TV broadcasting network, and was later broadcast on other independent stations and the AT-X network. The series was released in Japan as six separate Blu-ray Disc and DVD volumes between June 25 and November 25, 2009; each volume also contains an animated extra titled Tayutayu: Pure my Heart (たゆたゆ -Pure my heart-). Sentai Filmworks licensed the anime for distribution by Section23 Films in North America, and the series was released as a volume of two DVDs on March 16, 2010.

An Internet radio talk show titled Tayutama Radio: Hirusagari no Yometachi (タユタマらじお -昼下がりの嫁たち-) was hosted by Noriko Rikimaru and Asami Shimoda, who voiced Mashiro and Ameri respectively in the anime. The radio show was first streamed on the Japanese Internet radio network Onsen on March 9, 2009, and continued to do so every Monday until its tenth episode on July 13, 2009.

== Music ==
The Windows version of Tayutama has four main theme songs: "Konna Haru no Sora o" (こんな春の空を), the first opening theme, and "Niji o Mitsuketa Yō na Iro de" (虹を見つけたような色で), the ending theme, were sung by Haruka Shimotsuki; "Shunkan Spline" (瞬間スプライン, "Shunkan Supurain"; "Instantaneous Spline"), the second opening theme, and "Cherry", an insert song, were sung by Kicco. The Xbox 360 version featured three theme songs: "Ōka Shunkō" (桜花春煌), the first opening theme song, and "Eien o Hajimeyou" (永遠を始めよう; "Let's Begin Eternity"), the ending theme, were both performed by Kicco; "Doko made mo Tomo ni" (どこまでも共に; "Together Anywhere"), the second opening theme, was performed by Shimotsuki. There are also four additional insert songs, one for each heroine and was sung by their respective voice actresses. The insert song for Mashiro is "Marital Vows"; the insert song for Ameri is "Going My Way" (ごーいんぐまいうぇい, Gōingu Mai Uei); the insert song for Yumina is "Flower Doll"; and lastly, the insert song for Mifuyu is "Rainy Pain".

The first music release was a maxi single entitled "Shunkan Spline". The single contains the titular theme song and "Cherry", and was released on June 27, 2008. The game's original soundtrack was released on July 9, 2008. Of the 31 tracks collected in the album, two are the theme songs "Konna Haru no Sora o" and "Niji o Mitsuketa Yō na Iro de". Another maxi single, titled "The Fine Every Day", was released on April 22, 2009. The single contains the opening theme for the anime, "The Fine Every Day", and the opening theme for Tayutama: It's Happy Days, "Jōnetsu no Uoburu" (情熱のウォブル; "Passionate Wobble"), both sung by Kicco. A maxi single by Ui Miyazaki, titled "Kizuna no Uta" (キズナノ唄; "Song of Bonds"), was released on May 27, 2009, featuring the titular ending theme for the anime. An image song album, titled Tayutama: Kiss on my Deity Chara-son + (「タユタマ-Kiss on my Deity-」キャラソン+, Tayutama: Kiss on my Deity Kyarason+), was released on July 24, 2009, containing the Windows version's second opening theme and inserts. Lastly, an album titled Xbox 360 Tayutama: Kiss on my Deity Theme Songs (Xbox360ソフト「タユタマ-Kiss on my Deity-」主題歌集, Xbox 360 Sofuto "Tayutama: Kiss on my Deity" Shudaika-shū) was released on November 25, 2009.

== Reception and legacy ==
According to a sales ranking conducted by PCPress, Tayutama: Kiss on my Deity was the second best-selling bishōjo game in July 2008, only falling behind Key's Little Busters! Ecstasy. It was also the second most widely sold game on Getchu.com for July 2008, and was the sixth most widely sold game of the year on the website. The game was also the twenty-seventh most widely sold game on the website for the month of April 2009. The game received two awards from the 2008 Bishōjo Game Awards panel, a silver prize for graphics, coming behind Akabeisoft2's The Devil on G-String, and a gold prize for character designs. Tadamoto Ōsawa, the editor-in-chief of the Japanese bishōjo magazine BugBug, praised Moekibara for his heroines' appealing character designs, and cited Mashiro as a character fitting for the award.

The anime adaptation received mixed reviews. Chris Beveridge of Mania.com praised the series' aesthetics. He stated that it "has a solid looking presentation to it with its animation style and character design," and in particular found the costume and setting designs appealing. However, he criticized how the storyline "has a whole lot of the familiar ... that keeps it from standing well on its own," and described the series as "not bad, it's just another show that we've seen before." Stig Høgset of T.H.E.M. Anime Reviews also noted the characters are "generally pleasant to look at." He described the adaptation's story as "fairly straightforward and hardly difficult to follow," but criticized it as "basically written with a complete disregard for logic and common sense." Høgset concluded by comparing Tayutama's anime adaptation to Natsume's Book of Friends, stating that although the former is "honestly trying to tell a decent story about the possible friendship between two different races ... [the latter] does this a hell of a lot better."

Several characters from Tayutama also appear in video games created by other developers. Ameri, Mashiro, and Mifuyu were featured as playable characters in the fighting game Twinkle Queen. The game was released on August 26, 2010, for Wii, and also featured characters from The Devil on G-String, Windmill's Shukufuku no Campanella, and BaseSon's Shin Koihime Musō. Ameri and Mashiro were also featured as characters in Illusion's Characolle! 3D animation program series. The program's fourth entry, Characolle! Lump of Sugar, was released on July 1, 2011, and included the characters' models and scenery assets based on Tayutama's locales as part of the package.
