= List of Demon Lord, Retry! episodes =

Demon Lord, Retry! is an anime series adapted from the light novel of the same title written by Kurone Kanzaki. It is produced by Ekachi Epilka and directed by Hiroshi Kimura, with series composition by Ōka Tanisaki, and character designs by Chiyo Nakayama. The series aired from July 4 to September 19, 2019, on Tokyo MX and BS Fuji. (Note: Tokyo MX lists the series premiere on July 3, 2019, at 24:00, which is July 4 at midnight JST.) The opening theme song is "Tempest" performed by Kaori Ishihara, while the ending theme song is "New" performed by Haruka Tōjō. Funimation streamed the series, which following Sony's acquisition of Crunchyroll, the series was moved to its namesake platform.

An anime adaptation of the Demon Lord, Retry! R manga was announced on August 21, 2023. It was later revealed to be a television series produced by Gekkō and directed by Kazuomi Koga, with series composition by Katsuhiko Takayama, character designs by Minori Homura, and music by Supa Love. The season aired from October 5 to December 21, 2024, on Tokyo MX and other networks. The opening theme song is "Ashita Sekai ga Owaru Toshite mo" (明日世界が終わるとしても; Even if the World Ends Tomorrow) performed by Asca, while the ending theme song is "Clanssi:c" (クランシック) performed by MIMiNARI feat. Yuho Kitazawa. Crunchyroll streamed the series.

== Episodes ==
=== Demon Lord, Retry! (2019) ===
No.	Title (Note: All English titles are taken from Funimation.)	Original air date
1	"Demon Lord's Descent"; Transliteration: "Maō Kōrin" (Japanese: 魔王降臨)	July 4, 2019
After 15 years the MMORPG Infinity Game is shutting down. The game's creator, Akira Ono, suddenly finds himself summoned into the game as his character, the Demon Lord Hakuto Kunai. As he tries to grasp his situation, he encounters an injured girl fleeing from demon king Greol, the latter of whom attacks him, to little effect. The demon king is then quickly defeated with no effort. The girl, Aku, explains they are in the Kingdom of Holy Light whose people worship the Holy Church and the angel Cherub. As these are not parts of the original game, Akira (as Kunai) reasons that someone in the game must have tried to summon his character, the "demon lord" Hakuto Kunai, but accidentally summoned Akira in Kunai's body. Aku tells that she is an abused and mistreated orphan cast out by cruel villagers as a sacrifice to Greol. At a nearby shrine, Kunai finds the mages responsible for his summoning dead by Greol's hand, as well as a wishing idol. Upon being questioned, the idol says it cannot send Kunai home as this would contradict the wish that summoned him. Instead, it gives Kunai a magic ring before turning into dust. Kunai takes Aku back to her village but upon seeing the villagers abusing her, Kunai's anger awakens the ring, which encourages him to kill the villagers, saying he has the right and authority. Instead, Kunai reveals himself as the Demon Lord, sets the village on fire as revenge, and makes Aku his partner as they head towards the capital.
2	"Golden Luna"; Transliteration: "Kin'iro no Runa" (Japanese: 金色のルナ)	July 11, 2019
Luna Elegant, one of the three Holy Maidens, seeks out the rumoured Demon Lord to defeat him. O Wengoal and his bandits, the Moles, plan to ambush her and increase their reputation. Kunai plans to find another shrine idol, hoping a similar being to the one that summoned him could send him back home. The next morning, the Moles lay in wait for Luna's envoy, but Kunai and Aku walk into the "trap" first. Kunai initially mistakes O Wengoal for his boss from the real world, as the two look practically identical, causing them to have a confused conversation. This is interrupted by the arrival of Holy Maiden Luna, who forces the bandits to retreat while Kunai realises he can be injured by Luna's magic. Irritated by her arrogant, childish attitude, Kunai defeats her soldiers, then punishes her by spanking her repeatedly and requisitioning her money. Upon reaching the city, Kunai uses Luna's money to rent a room at an inn, (noting both upon entering the city and the inn that the naming habits of this world are terrible) and buys Aku food and new clothes, noticing Aku's heterochromia. Later they go dining together, and, overwhelmed by his kindness, Aku asks Kunai if there is any way she can repay him. Their meal and conversation is interrupted by an embarrassed and furious Luna barging into the restaurant to demand the return of her money. However, she is forced to calmly join them for dinner when threatened with a second spanking. She later insists on sharing their room since it was paid for with her gold. Elsewhere, a second Holy Maiden approaches the city with her soldiers.
3	"Killer Queen"; Transliteration: "Kirā Kuīn" (Japanese: キラー・クイーン)	July 18, 2019
Kunai asks Luna about the Cherub and learns it died after sealing away Greol, but the remaining two angels, Ophan and Seraph, are allegedly still alive (of note is that Luna states that some "misguided fools" believed the idol in the wishing shrine to be the Ophan. Kunai gives this theory more thought than Luna does). Luna's older sister, Holy Maiden Killer Queen, arrives in her war chariot with the intent to drag Luna home. Kunai comes up with a plan to make money by selling easily crafted and worthless (to Kunai) items to an antiques dealer. Luna and Queen bicker while an army of Satanists, believing they failed to summon the Demon Lord, plan to kill both Holy Maidens using a miasma sludge sealed in a box called Hades. Luna claims she tamed the Demon Lord, though Queen states that she doubts that a "Demon Lord" exists. The cult then attacks, and Kunai realises the cultists wear the same robes as the ones who summoned him. As the cultists unleash Hades to weaken Luna and Queen, Kunai's ring tempts him to murder the Maidens but Kunai refuses. The ring paralyses him, forcing him to swap into another of his Infinity Game avatars, Zero Kirisame, at the cost of Zero being in control and acting as his character had in the game. Zero defeats the cultists in short order and with aplomb. Queen instantly falls in love with him after he treats her like a woman instead of a warrior, and decides to make him her husband, realizing that Zero made her feel a way she had never thought possible before. Her unfortunate right-hand man Mount Fuji is unlucky enough to regain consciousness in time to witness Queen failing to contain her emotions, and is informed of his impending demise at Queen's hands for witnessing her lapse of personality. Zero leaves and turns back into Kunai, who is mortified at ever having created such an embarrassing character. Luna decides to continue travelling with Kunai and Aku while elsewhere, two bounty hunters debate what jobs they can take, noting a large bounty on a crudely illustrated picture of Kunai when settling on a job that calls for the extermination of an infestation of Sand Wolves.
4	"Yu Kirino"; Transliteration: "Kirino Yū" (Japanese: 桐野 悠)	July 25, 2019
While travelling aboard Luna's carriage, Kunai disguises Luna as a schoolgirl so she won't draw attention. The two bounty hunters, swordwoman Mikan and cross-dressing mage Yukikaze, are in the area hunting sand wolves for their bounty, but the pack is too large and they flee. Kunai, who happened to be nearby, defeats the wolves for skill points then leaves. Kunai notices Aku's leg has healed badly, causing her to limp. He uses his skill points to summon one of his NPC aides, Yu Kirino, a doctor and scientist who, despite being a genius, has an unfortunate sadistic streak and a fetish for young boys. Despite the possibility of Yu going rogue, Kunai summons her anyway and finds that in this new world, Yu is still loyal but has her own free will. Kunai decides to keep a close eye on her, forbids her from killing anyone, and discloses his situation. Using her unique skill "Hand of God", Yu fixes Aku's leg in no time, but is scolded by Kunai when she asks Aku to dress like a boy. While testing her leg, Aku suggests she has fallen in love with Kunai because of his kindness. Kunai thanks Yu for her help and his praise causes the now self-aware Yu to experience happiness and develop a crush on him. Later, as Aku sleeps, she gains a rare magical survival skill called "Heroine".
5	"Merciless Invasion"; Transliteration: "Yōsha naki shinryaku" (Japanese: 容赦なき侵略)	August 1, 2019
Due to defeating the sand wolves so easily, Mikan and Yukikaze are amazed by Kunai, though Mikan is irritated they lost the bounty. Meanwhile Utopia, founder of the Satanist Cult, after learning a "Demon Lord" killed Greol, decides to appease Hades by offering all the capital's citizens as sacrifices. Kunai and the others visit Luna's province, specifically Rabi Village, which is extremely run down as Luna has been letting the Holy Church manage it for her. Kunai suspects the Church deliberately gave her the least valuable territory to keep her out of the way. He decides to improve the village by adding a hospital and hot spring. He removes the useless Church manager and learns the village is populated by demi-humans called Bunnies, whom the Church consider inferior. The Bunnies are struggling to farm the poor quality soil, so Kunai uses skill points to provide an unlimited source of water and better fertiliser. Elsewhere, Luna's oldest sister, Holy Maiden Angel White, debates on the danger Kunai may pose. Dona Dona, the head noble, is determined to punish Kunai to please his fellow nobles, while the head soldier, Marshall Arts, prefers to wait and see what kind of man Kunai is for himself. Killer Queen barges in, still hopelessly obsessed with Zero, leaving Angel worried about her sisters' state of mind.
6	"Turmoil in the Capital"; Transliteration: "Shinto Dōran" (Japanese: 神都動乱)	August 8, 2019
At the Noma Noma tavern, the S-Rank adventurers Mink and Organ debate about the existence of a Dragonkin fighting for justice before being given a poster of the Demon Lord, whilst Mikan and Yukikaze overhear their talk. Meanwhile Kunai, Luna, and Yu hold a feast for Aku at the high-class restaurant Artemis in the kingdom's capital to celebrate her leg being healed. They are joined by Ebifry Butterfly, a central figure of nobility in the kingdom who Luna explains through Kunai's telepathic messaging is a powerful social figure with many connections through the kingdom. Kunai decides to attempt to gain her trust, and as he negotiates with her and tells about his improvements to be done at Luna's Rabi Village, the surrounding area comes under synchronised attacks by the Satanist Cult. Kunai tells his party to remain calm and stay in the restaurant while he takes care of the trouble. Mikan and Yukikaze are in the midst of the fighting, but Kunai comes to their aid and disposes the Satanists, who summon a mid-tier demon called Carnival. Kunai easily defeats Carnival and the populace cheers, recognising him from posters as the Demon Lord.
7	"All or Nothing"; Transliteration: "Kenkon'itteki" (Japanese: 乾坤一擲)	August 15, 2019
While the previous episode's fighting was happening, Carmiya, an assassin disguised as a clown calming down the nobles, approaches Kunai's party with the intent to poison them, but Yuu scares him away with a "magic trick" that involves amputating his arms. In another part of the capital, Killer Queen, Mount Fuji, and Marshall Arts clear out a horde of undead, and Mink defeats another group of Satanists whilst healing Church members. The surviving cultists regroup and summon a demon prince Oruit as their last resort, who lays waste to all the combatants and destroys Angel White's holy barrier. Tron is ordered by Utopia prior to the battle to fly in and dump the Hades miasma onto the combatants, and she does so while Mink and Queen try to hold their ground against Oruit. Kunai swaps to Zero Kirisame at the last minute and effortlessly defeats Oruit, but not before Oruit mortally wounds Tron and drains her blood to transform himself into a bestial entity. Zero revives Tron from death and upon being told she forgot how to smile, encourages her to regardless of her circumstance. Zero defeats Oruit once more and strikes a victory pose, to the amazement of Tron and the bliss of Killer Queen.
8	"Demon Lord's Handiwork"; Transliteration: "Maō no Yakudō" (Japanese: 魔王の躍動)	August 22, 2019
Kunai discusses with Angel White where he could obtain more information about Seraph, whilst Angel tries to deduce if he is still a legitimate threat to the kingdom and Church. Both parties end the conversation on seemingly amicable terms, though Angel was hiding her stress, worrying what Kunai's end goal is and wondering how he was able to tame the selfish Luna and defeat Greol so easily, whom Kunai called more like a cheap imitation than a demon king. Kunai finds he has collected enough skill points to summon a second NPC into the world and unlocked the ability to teleport to familiar locations. He and Aku visit the Church library to read up on the angels that allegedly created the world, but also to find ways to give himself resistance to magic, which did not exist in the futuristic setting of Infinity Game. A story he reads to Aku about a dog finding rare treasures in a dungeon gives Kunai the idea of such a possibility. On their way back, Tron finds Kunai and identifies him with Zero, insisting on travelling with him for saving her life. The group teleports back to Rabi Village and Kunai instantly constructs a hospital and hot springs resort, noting they are somehow still able to operate without a source of electricity, with the intent of employing the residents. He summons his aide Isami Tahara, for his fast learning capabilities and marksmanship skills, to protect Rabi Village.
9	"Dancing Swindler and the Giant Gold Coin"; Transliteration: "Odoru Sagishi to Dai Kinka" (Japanese: 踊る詐欺師と大金貨)	August 29, 2019
Isami Tahara is summoned by Kunai late at night, and is immediately taken aback by the unfamiliar world around him. Isami is taken into the resort and briefed on the situation, and he is frightened when told Yu is also with them. Isami is tasked with training the residents of the village and managing its upkeep, to which he thinks is too much work, but Kunai reassures he has the intelligence for it. When he pats Isami's arm, Isami receives a shock, but declines seeking Yu for help. Yu, Tron, Luna, and Aku greet Isami, while Kunai spends the night thinking how to prepare for Ebifry's arrival. Kunai returns to the capital and sells a music box to Nanden Mannen, the antiques dealer he visited before, for 15 gold coins. He then visits Bingo, the tailor whom he bought Aku's clothes from, and requests the making of 20 tuxedos and bunny suits. After establishing a food delivery route to Rabi Village, Kunai retreats backs to the inn for the night. Kunai/Akira swaps to Zero Kirisame for a while and ponders on the time he used to play as him. One week later, Ebifry arrives at the renewed Rabi Village. She brings with her Commando Sambo, and Kunai recommends Yu to cure his blindness, who uses eye drops. Sambo is overjoyed, and Ebifry pays Yu with a holy lambda coin worth 100 gold coins.
10	"Madam Roars"; Transliteration: "Madamu, hoeru" (Japanese: マダム、咆える)	September 5, 2019
A flashback from 10 years prior to the show's events shows a 6 year old Luna with a friend called Eagle rushing to a noble's mansion to buy bread. They are shunned away by the nobles and Luna retaliates by swearing she'll grow up to be a Holy Maiden and they'll get their comeuppance. Two years later, her training at the Church begins, at the cost of Eagle being executed for being a demi-human. She officially became a Holy Maiden at the age of 10 years, and was assigned her province which included Rabi Village. Seeing a young Kyon and Momo reminded Luna of Eagle, so she prayed to Cherub for strength. At this point, Luna's reminiscence is interrupted by Kunai and Ebifry approaching the hot springs. Luna takes Ebifry inside, her enthusiasm has Ebifry deduce Luna's crush on Kunai which she embarrassingly rejects. Ebifry ultimately decides to live in Rabi Village. Meanwhile, Angel learns of Ebifry's holiday in Rabi Village, thinking Kunai has manipulated her too, though Queen has no concern, saying Angel has yet to find love whilst the other two have. Isami and Yu converse while working on a map of the village's future development, Isami noting that Yu's personality has changed and that he refuses to waver to Ebifry's influence. Later, Kunai receives a checkup from Yu which devolves into Yu fondling his body, so Kunai abruptly leaves. That evening, everyone feasts and Tron goes to the bath hoping to see Zero but Kunai carries her back to the women's side. After bathing, Aku goes to sleep with Kunai, who is later joined by Luna making her own excuses to sleep with him.
11	"Yukikaze Attacks"; Transliteration: "Yukikaze, shūrai" (Japanese: ユキカゼ、襲来)	September 12, 2019
Kunai leaves the village to explore the capital again, leaving a letter behind for Luna and Aku telling them to not look for him. Yukikaze and Mikan encounter him there, and Yukikaze insists on inviting Kunai to his favourite tavern Noma Noma, where everyone treats Kunai to food and drink out of gratitude for defeating Carnival. Perturbed by Yukikaze's perverted mannerisms, Kunai states he is unfamiliar with the land's customs and adventurer system. Yukikaze and Mikan tell Kunai about the Guild accepting requests and receiving fees, having monster parts sold, rankings, other guilds competing for the attention of high-rank adventurers, and mercenary work. Kunai compares this business to professional sports, and notes the relative instability of the occupation. Yukikaze also mentions the current state of wartime makes traversing the northern territories difficult. Item classification is also elaborated: Normal, Solid, High-end, Unique, Legendary, and ineffective mass-produced items. Kunai decides to travel north, and Yukikaze volunteers; Kunai reasoning his need for an experienced guide. At the Church, Angel White's anxiety reaches a tipping point. She uses her Omega Staff to teleport to Luna to rescue her, but becomes confused at the sight of Rabi Village undergoing construction. Isami spots Angel, mistaking her for a magician hired for help, and tasks her with moving a supply of magic crystals. Angel eventually meets Luna, and is distraught by Luna's unwillingness to leave. Angel is even more unnerved at the sight of Tron, and is forced by Luna to let Kyon and Momo escort her to the baths. Believing it's her last chance to pry Luna from Kunai's influence, she explores the baths, and is surprised to find someone waiting for her.
12	"Angel White and Demon Lord"; Transliteration: "Shiro Tenshi to Maōu-sama" (Japanese: 白天使と魔王様)	September 19, 2019
Angel finds Kunai at the end of the baths, and reluctantly joins him at his insistence. Greatly embarrassed by the situation and flustered at the sight of Kunai, Angel attempts to interrogate him over his intentions for "deceiving" Luna and Ebifry. Kunai maintains his composure in front of a naked Angel and responds that they acted out of their own volition. Kunai coerces Angel to bathe and drink sake to calm her down. As the two talk, Angel becomes frustrated and breaks down over being called innocent, hardheaded, and ultimately admitting she is incompetent in managing the kingdom well on her own. Kunai gifts her an angel halo in a final effort to reassure her before leaving, noting she is the only Holy Maiden able to reflect her title. After the bath, Kunai uses his teleport skill and the two reappear back at the capital's castle, which Angel mistakes as the same miracle power she used to go to Rabi village. Further compounding this confusion, Kunai confides to Angel that the reason he wants to learn about Seraph is because he believes that Ophanim summoned him to this world, thinking back to the shrine idol. All of Angel's misunderstandings come together to confirm Kunai's identity as "Lucifer". As Kunai takes his leave, a smitten Angel promises to guide Kunai "back to what he once was". The next day, Kunai leaves Isami and Yu to the village's care as he departs to the northern city of Rookie with Yukikaze and Mikan. Upon arrival, they are greeted by a group of heroes led by an overweight young man in suspiciously modern clothing, and Kunai is repulsed by the sight. The episode ends with the tease "To be continued!!".

=== Demon Lord, Retry! R (2024) ===
No.	Title	Directed by (Note: Production staff information is taken from the ending credits of each episode.)	Written by	Storyboarded by	Original release date (Note: Episodes are released on ABEMA and Crunchyroll a week before their televised airings.)
1	"ReTry"; Transliteration: "Ritorai" (Japanese: リトライ -ReTry-)	Kazuomi Koga	Katsuhiko Takayama	Masayoshi Nishida	October 5, 2024
2	"ReStart"; Transliteration: "Risutāto" (Japanese: リスタート -ReStart-)	Rintaro Kitabayashi	Katsuhiko Takayama	Sekishige Sekino	October 12, 2024
3	"ReCycle"; Transliteration: "Risaikuru" (Japanese: リサイクル -ReCycle-)	Naoki Hishikawa	Takayama Katsuhiko	Naoki Hishikawa	October 19, 2024
4	"ReCruit"; Transliteration: "Rikurūto" (Japanese: リクルート -ReCruit-)	Azumaikuo Yamauchi	Katsuhiko Takayama	Teika Sasaki	October 26, 2024
5	"ReMind"; Transliteration: "Rimaindo" (Japanese: リマインド -ReMind-)	Yoshimura Asahi	Katsuhiko Takayama	Rintaro Kitabayashi & Sekino Sekiju	November 2, 2024
6	"ReUnion"; Transliteration: "Riyunion" (Japanese: リユニオン -ReUnion-)	Shigeru Yamazaki	Katsuhiko Takayama	Dazhou Zhengji	November 9, 2024
7	"ReMain"; Transliteration: "Rimein" (Japanese: リメイン -ReMain-)	Kansaku Ando, Rintaro Kitabayashi & Tatsuo Yamazaki	Katsuhiko Takayama	Tatsuo Yamazaki	November 16, 2024
8	"ReCovery"; Transliteration: "Rikabarī" (Japanese: リカバリー -ReCovery-)	Gao Xia Yong Cheng	Katsuhiko Takayama	Masayoshi	November 23, 2024
9	"ReQuest"; Transliteration: "Rikuesuto" (Japanese: リクエスト -ReQuest-)	Kenya Ueno	Katsuhiko Takayama	Junichi Sakata	November 30, 2024
10	"ReScue"; Transliteration: "Resukyū" (Japanese: レスキュー -ReScue-)	Hidetoshi Omori	Katsuhiko Takayama	Hidetoshi Omori	December 7, 2024
11	"ReSurrect"; Transliteration: "Rizarekuto" (Japanese: リザレクト -ReSurrect-)	Naoki Hishikawa	Katsuhiko Takayama	Tatsuo Yamazaki	December 14, 2024
12	"ReVenge"; Transliteration: "Ribenji" (Japanese: リベンジ -ReVenge-)	Yasuhiro Tomita; Kazuomi Koga	Katsuhiko Takayama	Teika Sasaki	December 21, 2024
