= Wagamama High Spec =

Japanese visual novel and anime series

- Original visual novel cover featuring four heroines (from left to right) Kaoruko Rokuonji, Mihiro Miyase, Toa Narumi and Ashe Rufflette Sakuragi

ワガママハイスペック (Wagamama Haisupekku)
- Genre: Drama, romance
- Anime television series
- Directed by: Satoshi Shimizu
- Written by: Kōjirō Nakamura
- Studio: AXsiZ
- Licensed by: NA: Crunchyroll
- Original network: Tokyo MX, Sun TV
- Original run: April 11, 2016 – June 27, 2016
- Episodes: 12
- Video game
- Developer: Madosoft
- Publisher: JP: Madosoft (Windows); JP: iMel (PS Vita, Switch); WW: Sekai Project (Windows)
- Genre: Eroge, Visual novel
- Platform: Windows, PlayStation Vita, Nintendo Switch
- Released: Windows: JP: April 28, 2016; WW: July 25, 2017; PlayStation Vita: JP: July 27, 2017; Nintendo Switch: JP: September 24, 2020
- Video game

Wagamama High Spec Over Clock
- Developer: Madosoft
- Publisher: JP: Madosoft
- Genre: Eroge, Visual novel
- Platform: Windows
- Released: JP: August 25, 2017

Wagamama High Spec (Japanese: ワガママハイスペック, Hepburn: Wagamama Haisupekku; lit. "Selfish High Spec"), officially abbreviated as Wagahigh (ワガハイ, Wagahai), is a Japanese adult visual novel developed by Madosoft and was released for Windows on April 28, 2016. It was ported to the PlayStation Vita. An English version of the visual novel was released by Sekai Project in July 2017. A 12-episode anime television series adaptation animated by AXsiZ aired between April and June 2016. A sequel to the visual novel titled Wagamama High Spec Over Clock was released in August 2017. The sequel was announced at the Comic Market 91 event on December 29, 2016.

== Gameplay ==
Average dialogue in Wagamama High Spec depicting the main character Kōki talking to Mihiro, Toa, Kaoruko and Ashe (respectively).

Wagamama High Spec is a romance visual novel in which the player assumes the role of Kōki Narumi. Much of its gameplay is spent on reading the story's narrative and dialogue. The text in the game is accompanied by character sprites, which represent who Kōki is talking to, over background art. Throughout the game, the player encounters CG artwork at certain points in the story, which take the place of the background art and character sprites. The game follows a branching plot line with multiple endings, and depending on the decisions that the player makes during the game, the plot will progress in a specific direction.

There are four main plot lines that the player will have the chance to experience, one for each heroine. Throughout gameplay, the player is given multiple options to choose from, and text progression pauses at these points until a choice is made. Some decisions can lead the game to end prematurely, which offer an alternative ending to the plot. To view all plot lines in their entirety, the player will have to replay the game multiple times and choose different choices to further the plot to an alternate direction. Throughout gameplay, there are scenes with sexual CGs depicting Kōki and a given heroines having sex.

== Plot ==
Kōki Narumi is a male student at Ōsui Academy (桜翠学園, Ōsui Gakuen). Ōsui Academy doesn't have many male students as it changed from an all-girls school to a coeducation school one year ago. Kōki secretly acts as a manga author under the name "Imosarada" (literally Potato Salad), with spending his ordinary school life. Toa Narumi is a female student at Ōsui Academy. She is from a good family and serves the student council president. At the start of the story, there is not any relationship between Kōki and Toa in the school.

One day, Toa finds out that Kōki is "Imosarada" due to an unexpected event. Toa calls Kōki at the student council room and confides her secret to him. Actually, she is "Shika-kun", an illustrator drawing illustrations of Kōki manga. As she is searching for male members for the student council at that time, Toa suggests to Kōki that he should join the council. Although Toa's best friend, Mihiro Miyase, strongly opposes Kōki's joining, he becomes a member of the council to help Toa.

After Kōki's joining, vice president, Ashe Rufflette Sakuragi, and student council president, Kaoruko Rokuonji, also join the student council. In this way, Kōki comes to be involved in various tasks with the four heroines: Toa, Mihiro, Ashe and Kaoruko.

== Characters ==
=== Main characters ===
Kōki Narumi (鳴海 幸樹, Narumi Kōki)
A second-year student of Ōsui Academy. He secretly acts as a manga author under the pen name "Imosarada" (いもさらだ; "potato salad") and serializes a romantic comedy manga titled Deredere Scramble (デレデレスクランブル; lit. Lovestruck Scramble) in a magazine named Weekly Shōnen Champ (週刊少年チャンプ).

Kaoruko Rokuonji (鹿苑寺 かおるこ, Rokuonji Kaoruko)
Voiced by: Hiyo Sakurano (game), Mariko Honda (anime)
A first-year student and the student council president of Ōsui Academy. She has a kind personality and is respected by other students. She secretly acts as an illustrator under the pen name "Shika-kun" (しかくん; "deer") and has drawn illustrations for Kōki's manga since a year before. Kōki and Kaoruko did not initially know their real names and identities, because they were always contacted through their editor and had never met directly.

Ashe Rufflette Sakuragi (桜木・ルーフォレット・アーシェ, Sakuragi Rūforetto Āshe)
Voiced by: Aine Sakura (game), Megu Sakuragawa (anime)
A second-year student and the student council vice president. She is good at playing the piano as her parents are musicians, and currently aims to be a composer. She has a strong personality and thinks of Kōki as her rival. She has a large appetite.

Toa Narumi (鳴海 兎亜, Narumi Toa)
Voiced by: Ann Komatsu (game), Mai Gotō (anime)
A first-year student and Kōki's younger sister. She is good at computer programming and can develop application software by herself. She has a quiet and lazy personality and often plays truant from school. She knows that Kōki is a manga author. She is a fan of Shika-kun.

Mihiro Miyase (宮瀬 未尋, Miyase Mihiro)
Voiced by: Aoi Shirosaki (game), Chiyo Ousaki (anime)
A first-year student and Toa's best friend. She is good at cuisine as her family runs a yōshoku restaurant. She is a bit mischievous and often enjoys teasing Kōki. She also knows that Kōki is a manga author. She placed first at this year's entrance examination.

=== Other characters ===
Karen Watanuki (四月一日 奏恋, Watanuki Karen)
Voiced by: Ryōko Mizuha (game)
A second-year student and Kōki's classmate. She is the class representative of Kōki's class and sits the next to Kōki in the classroom. She is the vice president of the school's drama club and hopes for Kaoruko and Ashe to join the club.

Yukari Iwakuma (岩隈 縁, Iwakuma Yukari)
Voiced by: Rino Kawashima (game)
A social studies teacher at Ōsui Academy. She is a homeroom teacher of Kōki's class and an advisor at the student council.

Chitose Takatsuka (鷹司 千歳, Takatsuka Chitose)
Voiced by: Koromo Ginno (game)
An editor at the manga magazine Weekly Shōnen Champ. She is responsible for Deredere Scramble, the manga written by Imosarada (Kōki) and illustrated by Shika-kun (Kaoruko).

Kotarō Satō (佐藤 虎太郎, Satō Kotarō)
Voiced by: Kazusa Kitani (game)
A first-year student who is a classmate of Toa and Mihiro. He often gets mistaken for a girl due to his lovely face and small stature.

Masato Ikari (猪狩 雅人, Ikari Masato)
Voiced by: Uta Kijima (game)
A second-year student and Kōki's classmate. He is popular among the school's girls but does not have any girlfriend because he likes fat women and is not interested in slender girls.

Kinjirō Sarukawa (沙流川 金次郎, Sarukawa Kinjirō)
Voiced by: Ryōji Koura (game)
A second-year student and Kōki's classmate. He is not popular among the school's girls because he likes eroge/galge and is a bit pervert. Kōki and Masato nickname him as "Saru" (サル; "monkey") after his surname. He is the president of the Boys Club (男子部, Danshi-bu), an amusement club for the school's male students.

== Development and release ==
External videos
- Wagamama High Spec PV (Sekai Project) - YouTube
- Wagamama High Spec Opening Movie (Madosoft official channel) - YouTube

Wagamama High Spec is Madosoft's third game after Namaiki Delation in July 2013, and Yakimochi Stream in September 2014. The game's first news was released in June 2015. The game's character design was provided by Tsumire Utsunomiya; super deformed illustrations was provided by Nanateru. The scenario was written by five authors; Mojasubii, Ryūsuke Mutsu, Nissy, Coyote Hayama, and Hato. Hato is a scenario writer of Nora, Princess, and Stray Cat, developed by Harukaze. The game's theme song is "Miracle Heart!!", sung by Haruna Ōshima and composed by Yūya Saitō. The design direction was provided by Cao.

The game's free trial version became available for download on December 24, 2015, in Japan, and a prologue was released on February 4, 2016. The game's full version was released on April 28, 2016, for Windows. A PlayStation Vita port was released by iMel on July 27, 2017. An English version was released by Sekai Project on July 25, 2017, for Windows and is distributed on Steam.

A sequel developed by Madosoft titled Wagamama High Spec Over Clock was released on August 25, 2017, for Windows.

== Adaptations ==
=== Anime ===
External videos
- TV anime Wagamama High Spec PV(Madosoft official channel) - YouTube

A 12-episode anime television series adaptation was produced by AXsiZ, directed by Satoshi Shimizu, written by Kōjirō Nakamura, and the character design was provided by Masashi Nomura. It aired between April 11 and June 27, 2016, on Tokyo MX and Sun TV as a series of five-minute shorts. The series was released on Blu-ray in Japan on August 26, 2016. The anime's ending theme is "High Spec Days" (ハイスペックDays) sung by Haruna Ōshima. The single containing the theme song was released on June 22, 2016.

An Internet radio show to promote the anime titled Wagamama High Spec Radio (ワガママハイスペックRADIO) aired six episodes between April 6 and June 15, 2016. The show was produced by the Internet radio station "Onsen" and was streamed online every other Wednesday. It is hosted by Mai Gotō, the voice actress of Toa Narumi.

No.	Title	Original release date
1	"Glaring Summer Days" "Giragira Samā Deizu" (ギラギラサマーデイズ)	April 11, 2016
The four student council members—Kaoruko Rukuonji (president), Ashe R. Sakuragi (vice-president), Mihiro Miyase (secretary), and Toa Narumi (treasurer)—are introduced. The four girls are doing their work on a hot day in June and sweating profusely in the student council room. Unable to stand the heat, Ashe proposes that they take off their clothes, owing to no one seeing them and anyway, they are all girls. At this idea, Mihiro agrees heartily and Kaoruko follows their example shyly. Meanwhile, Toa was just about to sneak off to the library to escape the heat and the embarrassment of taking off her clothes. However, the others spring up on her and despite her protests, begins to remove her clothes. Screaming, Toa pushes past them and hits the air-conditioner switch, causing the temperature to shoot up to a boiling 40 degrees Celsius. Now hotter than ever, all the girls express their desire to leave the room, but Kaoruko brings up a good point that the students would probably call them perverts. In the Nantonaku Wakaru Wagahigh (なんとなくわかるワガハイ; literally Somehow Understanding Wagahigh) corner, they introduce Ousui Academy's Student Council President, Kaoruko Rokuonji, who is a manga illustrator. She draws a manga written by Narumi Kouki, Toa's elder brother, and imply that he might appear in future episodes.
2	"Cheerful Cooking" "Ukiuki Kukkingu" (ウキウキクッキング)	April 18, 2016
Mihiro's family runs a Western restaurant, and she wishes for her friends to give her some dish ideas. Toa proposes snacks like ice-cream and potato chips, which are immediately eliminated. Ashe prepares a humongous bowl of udon for Mihiro to try next, but Mihiro refuses. Lastly Kaoruko prepares a simple meal of bitter curry and rice, to which Mihiro happily wolfs down before screeching two seconds later that it is too spicy. Kaoruko, surprised, tries it, and adds more spices to it instead. In the end, Mihiro's family restaurant's new menu for the summer was still a great success. In Nantonaku Wakaru Wagahigh corner, they introduce Mihiro Miyase, who is a poster girl for her parents' restaurant, "Youshoku Miyase", a great cook, has great grades, and has the biggest chest among them. Ashe points out that Mihiro says surprising things at times, and bans Kaoruko from trying to say it on-air.
3	"Last-Minute Drawing" "Girigiri Dorōingu" (ギリギリドローイング)	April 25, 2016
Kaoruko, who illustrates manga, is unable to portray the character in the manner she wants it too. So she asks Mihiro and Toa to help by modelling for her. Toa initially refuses, but after espying the prize: Hokkaido Limited Edition Potatoes, Maya no Mezame (マヤのめざめ, literally Maya's Awakening), she 'turns' into Kaoruko's servant in order to get them. As the 2 girls model and Toa is asked to kiss Mihiro, Ashe saunts in to see the both of them kissing. Blushing furiously, Ashe hurriedly apologises and immediately try to leave the student council room in embarrassment, while an embarrassed Mihiro tries to explain the situation. In Nantonaku Wakaru Wagahigh corner, they introduces Ashe R. Sakuragi, the vice-president of Ousui Academy Student Council. Her mother is a famous pianist, and her father is a former violinist. Despite being from a rich family, Toa points out that she has commoner-like tastes, while Mihiro adds that she eats a lot in diners, with Kaoruko supporting the argument, to Ashe's shock and surprise.
4	"Frantic Hunting" "Dotabata Hantingu" (ドタバタハンティング)	May 2, 2016
Due to Kaoruko's constant sketches of manga, the floor is now littered with balls of used paper. Toa and Ashe do not seem to mind as they feel that the cleaner is coming on the weekends to clean up anyway. Their lazy manner is changed to fear when Kaoruko notices a cockroach scuttling among the papers. Screaming, the three girls except for the fearless Mihiro huddle in a corner and they beg Mihiro to kill it. At once, Mihiro is prepared to take action, scrolling up a piece of paper in her hands, she slams it down on the cockroach, which is killed immediately. The girls are greatly relieved, but Mihiro, due to experience of running a restaurant, knows that there are bound to be more cockroaches, ordering them to clean up the student council room. After cleaning, the student council room has seemingly magically turned clean. However, there seem to be many more under the chest of drawers. In Nantonaku Wakaru Wagahigh corner, they introduces Toa Narumi. Despite being lazy, she has high-programming skill. When Kaoruko points out that even breathing is a chore for Toa, she tries to stop breathing, and passes out as a result.
5	"Scary After-School" "Bikubiku Afutā Sukūru" (ビクビクアフタースクール)	May 9, 2016
Ashe is spooked out after reading a book of horror stories she borrowed from Kouki. Due to the late hour, she heads for home, but is spooked out by the dimness and silence of the school. Suddenly, she is spies many crows flying about, and runs away down the hall in fright, and down the stairs. There, she is freaked out by a faceless girl wearing a dripping wet uniform and sprints back up to the student council room, where she meets Toa. However, as Toa stands up to greet her, Ashe realises that Toa's face resembles a deathly pale ghost face, and faints in fright. In truth, the crows were flying to Mihiro, who was feeding them bits of grain and rice. The faceless girl was actually Kaoruko, whose black locks happened to fall over her face. Her uniform was wet as the faucet had broken and sprayed her with water. Meanwhile, Toa was chewing some bubble gum, which when popped, splattered onto her face in a white gooey glob. In Nantonaku Wakaru Magahigh corner, they introduces Narumi Kouki, while pointing out that there is no sign of him appearing in the anime. Toa suggest that the viewers be her new brother by using methods cannot be said in television, which Ashe points out it is just direct marketing.
6	"Puzzlingly Mysterious" "Nazonazo Misuteriasu" (ナゾナゾミステリアス)	May 16, 2016
Kaoruko gets excited after noticing a strange paper that Toa's brother, Kouki, left on the desk in the student council room, believing it to be the key to writing the next chapter of their Manga. In the end, Kaoruko supposedly solves it after looking through ancient Sumerian writing, converting it via calculation of Saturn's orbital period, omitting all 'noise' texts, before translating it to Aomori text and then ancient Japanese text, revealing the message: In the seventh month of 2016, the human race will die. Kaoruko innocently believes the message, and begins to weep but Mihiro and Ashe find it rather ridiculous. As the 3 girls begin to argue, Toa arrives, take a glance at the note, and explains to them that her brother's handwriting gets very messy when he is in a hurry, helping them translate the message: I am in a supplementary class because I failed a test, so I'll be late. This proves to be something totally unrelated to what Kaoruko originally made it out to be. In Nantonaku Wakaru Wagahigh corner, since there are nothing left to explain, none of them but Ashe does the title call. When they thought of something to do in the corner, Toa suggests on explaining KakoTama, a smartphone game.
7	"Mumbly Sleeping" "Munyamunya Surīpingu" (ムニャムニャスリーピング)	May 23, 2016
Kaoruko has bags under her eyes due to how she has been burning the midnight oil. Ashe and Mihiro, noticing this, are determined to put Kaoruko to sleep and let her have some rest. Mihiro sings her a lullaby while Ashe tucks her in, but this does not appear to work. Ashe then tries hypnosis therapy but gets hypnotized herself instead. In the end, Toa proposes a CD of sleep-effective music which she just bought recently. This soon proves to be effective and Kaoruko is soon fast asleep. The other girls then prepare to do some work. When Kaoruko wakes up feeling refreshed, she espies the other girls had been fast asleep as well, thanks to the CD. The Nantonaku Wakaru Wagahigh has been renamed to Nantonaku Wakaru KakoTama corner. To help them explain, Kaoruko invites two people; a shrine maiden and a girl with animal ears.
8	"Suspenseful Mechanic" "Harahara Mekanikku" (ハラハラメカニック)	May 30, 2016
There is a robot in the Student Council Room that can supposedly help with school life. Ashe, excited at seeing a robot for the first time, is keen to examine it but accidentally breaks off the robot's head. Mihiro then lets Ashe be the 'new robot' instead by wrapping her with cardboard and stashing the real robot away. Kaoruko is also excited to meet the 'new robot' and has it do much work for her. However, Toa seems to suspect something. Mihiro is nervous that Toa will figure out that the robot is actually Ashe, but actually Toa had received a note from the Faculty Office earlier in which the company requested that they bring back the robot as there is a critical design error. A resigned Mihiro then knows that the jig is up, while an unsuspecting Ashe is still being used by the president to do chores. In Nantonaku Wakaru KakoTama corner, they explain that KakoTama's time setting is set during Taisho era Japan. While the shrine maiden tries to introduce herself, Kaoruko steps in, to her dismay.
9	"Kitty Kitty Melancholic" "Nekoneko Merankorikku" (ネコネコメランコリック)	June 6, 2016
Mihiro has found a cat outside the school and takes it to Toa, asking for help to find its owner as there is a collar around it. Toa agrees but Mihiro then asks Toa to take care of the cat too as she lives at a restaurant, and pets are not allowed. Toa sighs and agrees. She writes plenty of notices and request that the other girls help her out by distributing them at the school gate. So far, there had been no replies and the cat is instead wreaking havoc and causing a lot of inconvenience for Toa. In the end, the find the owner of the cat and both the owner and the cat thanks Toa gratefully, ending with the cat's grateful mews resounding through the cool evening air. In Nantonaku Wakaru KakoTama corner, Toa explains on how to play KakoTama: by encircling the stones to attack the enemy, which is called Akui. The girl with the animal ears is known as Chimimaru, a yōma.
10	"This-and-That Slapstick" "Arekore Surappusutikku" (アレコレスラップスティック)	June 13, 2016
Since the academy's website can now upload videos, advised by the teachers, Kaoruko wants the Student Council to upload a movie. They throw some idea for the movie's theme; academy love story, horror, science fiction, ESP, gourmet, and serial drama. In the end, they make a movie by using all of the themes: In a dystopic Ohnari Academy, the Glutton Empress Arche is challenged by Mihiron in an eating contest. Empress Arche choked, so Mihiron wins the contest. Out of nowhere, a mysterious ESP user (portrayed by Kaoruko) revives Arche with her puppeteering skill. In return, out of Axis-kun the robot (who happens to also be the judge of the contest), a ninja appears (portrayed by Toa), defeating both of the enemies. Toa's deed has somehow managed to steal Mihiron's heart, as the preview ends in a hanging scene, asking the viewers to look forward for the full movie for the conclusion of the forbidden love. Kaoruko seems pleased about the movie, while Ashe and Mihiro object to the action of uploading the bad movie. In Nantonaku Wakaru KakoTama corner, when Mihiro asks whether youma eat humans, Chimimaru says that it depends on the time and situation. The shrine maiden is known as Kohaku, and Toa compliments her as being cool. While Kohaku deny it out of being modest, Chimimaru agrees and reveal that her master Kohaku is a girl that ran away from home, angering her master.
11	"Round-and-Round Swimming" "Guruguru Suimingu" (グルグルスイミング)	June 20, 2016
The girls are at a spa resort having fun at the pool, and Ashe shows them how to dive. She executes it perfectly, but loses her bikini top in the process. The plot thickens when Ashe's bikini top is left floating towards the 'Dangerous Zone' of the spa resort, which Mihiro foresees that there will be a lot of dangerous creatures there. However, they still venture into the 'Dangerous Zone', and get sidetracked by whirlpools, big waves and geysers. In the end, Ashe manages to get her bikini top, but slips down a long and slippery slide, thankfully emerging unhurt and with her bikini top. However, Ashe's bikini bottoms are floating away now. In Nantonaku Wakaru KakoTama corner, Toa expertly makes up KakoTama's plot background, which turns out to be true after all. Mihiro points out that Chimimaru is getting used to the corner already.
12	"Exciting Surprise" "Dokidoki Sapuraizu" (ドキドキサプライズ)	June 27, 2016
Toa's brother, Kouki Narumi comes to the student council room, only to get himself asked to buy foods; oshiruko for Mihiro, miso soup for Ashe, oden for Toa and tom yam for Kaoruko. The instant he leaves, all of them breath a sigh of relief, and starts preparing for Kouki's surprise birthday party. They want to thank him for all he has done, while Toa pointing out that they rely on her brother too much, and lately he spends more time outside than in the student council. When Kouki returns, they greet him and wish him a happy birthday, with Kaoruko praises him for managing to find the tom yam she orders. In Nantonaku Wakaru KakoTama corner, once again, Ashe is the only one trying to do the title call. Kaoruko explains that they have nothing planned for the last corner, shocking Ashe and Kohaku. Mihiro suggests that the viewers play KakoTama themselves. Kohaku then asks Kaoruko on how is she going to return home, in which the latter replies that she has no idea.

== See also ==
- Hamidashi Creative, another visual novel developed by Madosoft
