= Makina-san's a Love Bot?! =

Japanese manga series

- First tankōbon volume cover, featuring Makina Agatsuma

かくして! マキナさん!! (Kakushite! Makina-san!!)
- Genre: Erotic comedy; Romantic comedy; Science fiction
- Manga
- Written by: Yoshimi Sato
- Published by: Futabasha
- English publisher: NA: Seven Seas Entertainment
- Imprint: Action Comics
- Magazine: Monthly Action (October 25, 2022 – February 24, 2024); Web Comic Action (April 2, 2024 – December 2, 2025)
- Original run: October 25, 2022 – December 2, 2025
- Volumes: 6
- Anime television series
- Directed by: Masayoshi Nishida; Kentaro Iino (assistant)
- Written by: Yōhei Kashii
- Music by: Kyohei Matsuno
- Studio: BloomZ; Wolfsbane (production cooperation)
- Licensed by: OceanVeil
- Original network: Tokyo MX, BS Fuji (censored)
- Original run: April 7, 2025 – June 23, 2025
- Episodes: 12

Makina-san's a Love Bot?! (かくして! マキナさん!!, Kakushite! Makina-san!!; lit. 'Hide! Makina-san!!' (Note: The word 隠して ('hide') is spelled in hiragana as a pun with かくして (or 斯くして), meaning 'thus', played on at the start of each issue name. Therefore, the title, in the form かくして、マキナさん, also means 'Thus, Makina-san [...]'.)) is a Japanese manga series written and illustrated by Yoshimi Sato. It began serialization on Futabasha's seinen manga magazine Monthly Action in October 2022. After the magazine's disbandment in February 2024, it was transferred to the Web Comic Action website in April of the same year, and ended in December 2025. An anime television series adaptation produced by BloomZ aired from April to June 2025.

== Plot ==
Eita Akutsu is a shy robot enthusiast who pines for his popular classmate Makina Agatsuma. One day, Makina is caught in an apartment bombing. She reveals to Eita that she is an advanced lifelike android and instructs him on how to repair her. She starts living with him and constantly tries to seduce him.

== Characters ==
Makina Agatsuma (我妻 マキナ, Agatsuma Makina)
Voiced by: Tomoyo Takayanagi (Japanese); Chloe Eves (English)
Eita Akutsu (阿久津 栄太, Akutsu Eita)
Voiced by: Yō Taichi (Japanese); P.M. Seymour (English)
Mimika Imose (妹兄 ミミカ, Imose Mimika)
Voiced by: Yūki Kuwahara (Japanese); Mana T. Johnson (English)
Mamimi (まみみ)
Voiced by: Hina Natsume (Japanese); Hayley Nelson (English)
Alma Sakimori (防人 アルマ, Sakimori Aruma)
Voiced by: Eriko Matsui (Japanese); Elsie Lovelock (English)
Landlady (大家さん, Ōya-san)
Voiced by: Ryōko Shintani (Japanese); Jennifer Silverman (English)

== Media ==
=== Manga ===
Written and illustrated by Yoshimi Sato, Makina-san's a Love Bot?! began serialization in Futabasha's seinen manga magazine Monthly Action on October 25, 2022. After the final issue of the Monthly Action magazine was published on February 24, 2024, the series was transferred to the Web Comic Action website on April 2 the same year. The series ended on December 2, 2025. The series' chapters were collected into six tankōbon volumes released from April 12, 2023, to January 15, 2026.

In March 2025, Seven Seas Entertainment announced that they had licensed the series for English publication.

==== Volumes ====
No.	Original release date	Original ISBN	English release date	English ISBN
1	April 12, 2023	978-4-575-85830-3	October 14, 2025	979-8-89561-086-2
1. "Makina-san Gets Mech-sposed" (かくして、マキナさんはメカバレる。, Kakushite, Makina-san wa Meka-bareru.); 2. "Makina-san's in My Room" (かくして、マキナさんは部屋にいる。, Kakushite, Makina-san wa Heya ni Iru.); 3. "Makina-san Acquires a Uniform" (かくして、マキナさんは制服を得る。, Kakushite, Makina-san wa Seifuku o Eru.); 4. "Makina-san Can't Hide It All" (かくして、マキナさんは隠しきれない。, Kakushite, Makina-san wa Kakushikirenai.); 5. "Makina-san's Taken Away" (かくして、マキナさんは奪われる。, Kakushite, Makina-san wa Ubawareru.); Bonus: "Makina-san F**ks" (かくして、マキナさんは○○る。, Kakushite, Makina-san wa ****ru.)
2	November 9, 2023	978-4-575-85906-5	January 6, 2026	979-8-89561-087-9
6. "Makina-san's Sister Switches In" (かくして、姉妹機たちは入れ替わる。, Kakushite, Shimaiki-tachi wa Irekawaru.); 7. "Makina-san Takes Her Body Back" (かくして、マキナさんはとりもどす。, Kakushite, Makina-san wa Torimodosu.); 8. "Makina-san Becomes a Horror Story" (かくして、マキナさんは怪談となる。, Kakushite, Makina-san wa Kaidan to Naru.); 9. "Makina-san's Kiss" (かくして、マキナさんはちゅーをする。, Kakushite, Makina-san wa Chū o Suru.); 10. "Makina-san Goes Home" (かくして、マキナさんは実家に戻る。, Kakushite, Makina-san wa Jikka ni Modoru.); 11. "The Weapon Makes Its Move" (かくして、マキナさんはその兵器は動き出す。, Kakushite, Makina-san wa Sono Heiki wa Ugokidasu.); Bonus: "Makina-san Gets Mended" (マキナさんのメンテ事情, Makina-san no Mente Jijō)
3	May 10, 2024	978-4-575-85963-8	May 5, 2026	979-8-89561-088-6
12. "Makina-san's Stuck with Cocks" (かくして、マキナさんはオナモミる。, Kakushite, Makina-san wa Onamomiru.); 13. "Makina-san Doesn't Make a Debut" (かくして、マキナさんはデビューしない。, Kakushite, Makina-san wa Debyū Shinai.); 14. "Makina-san Engages in Some Lewd Exercise" (かくして、マキナさんはHな運動をする。, Kakushite, Makina-san wa Ecchi na Undō o Suru.); 15. "Makina-san Gets Sucked on in the Gym Storage Room" (かくして、マキナさんは体育館で吸われる。, Kakushite, Makina-san wa Taiikukan de Suwareru.); 16. "The AIs Get Creative" (かくして、そのAIたちはクリエイティブる。, Kakushite, Sono AI-tachi wa Kurieitiburu.); 17. "Mimika-chan Acquires an Underling" (かくして、みみかちゃんは手下を得る。, Kakushite, Mimika-chan wa Teshita o Eru.); Bonus: "Makina-san Gets Mended 2" (マキナさんのメンテ事情 2, Makina-san no Mente Jijō 2)
4	December 12, 2024	978-4-575-86033-7	September 8, 2026	979-8-89561-651-2
18. "Makina-san Cooks" (かくして、マキナさんはクッキングる。, Kakushite, Makina-san wa Kukkinguru.); 19. "Youth Makes Suckers of Us All" (かくして、若さは掃除機の用法を違わせる。, Kakushite, Wakasa wa Zōjiki no Yōhō o Tagawaseru.); 20. "Makina-san Encounters Her Sister" (かくして、その姉妹は遭遇する。, Kakushite, Sono Shimai wa Sōgū Suru.); 21. "The Weaponized Robot Cheers Up" (かくして、兵器ロボは元気になる。, Kakushite, Heiki Robo wa Genki ni Naru.); 22. "Makina-san Destroys a Butt" (かくして、おケツは決壊する。, Kakushite, Oketsu wa Kekkai Suru.); 23. "Makina-san and the Indescribable, Very Strange Happenings" (かくして、その怪現象は名状しがたい。, Kakushite, Sono Kaigenshō wa Meijō Shigatai.)
5	June 12, 2025	978-4-575-86102-0	January 19, 2027	979-8-89765-744-5
24. Kakushite, Makina-san wa Inaku Naru. (かくして、マキナさんはいなくなる。); 25. Kakushite, Kaigenshō wa Mokugeki Sareru. (かくして、怪現象は目撃される。); 26. Kakushite, Makina-san-tachi wa Dejitaru. (かくして、マキナさんたちはデジタる。); 27. Kakushite, Minna wa Karada o Arau. (かくして、みんなはからだを洗う。); 28. Kakushite, Sono Heiki wa Kuzureochiru. (かくして、その兵器は崩れ落ちる。); 29. Kakushite, Akutsu Eita wa Rachi Sareru. (かくして、阿久津栄太は拉致される。)
6	January 15, 2026	978-4-575-86183-9	—	—
30. Kakushite, Akutsu Eita wa Nigeōseru. (かくして、阿久津栄太は逃げおおせる。); 31. Kakushite, Ēta wa Asa Kaeru. (かくして、えーたは朝帰る。); 32. Kakushite, Nazo no Shōjo wa Haiyotte Kuru. (かくして、謎の少女は這いよってくる。); 33. Kakushite, Yoku Wakannai Mono to Kaikō Suru. (かくして、よくわかんないモノと邂逅する。); 34. Kakushite, Sono Rejidensu wa Ībiru. (かくして、そのレジデンスはイービる。); 35. Kakushite, Shimai wa Meka-bareru. (かくして、姉妹はメカバレる。); 36. Kakushite, Subete ga Motodooru. (かくして、全てが元どおる。); 37. Kakushite, Yatsura wa Maimodoru. (かくして、やつらは舞い戻る。)

=== Anime ===
An anime television series adaptation was announced on May 10, 2024. The series was produced by BloomZ in cooperation with Wolfsbane and directed by Masayoshi Nishida, with Yōhei Kashii handling series composition, Yusaku Nakamura designing the characters, Kentaro Iino serving as assistant director, and Kyohei Matsuno composing the music. It aired from April 7 to June 23, 2025, on Tokyo MX and BS Fuji. The opening theme song, "Ie de Yeah! tte Age Tiger" (家でYeah!ってアゲタイガー; "At Home, Yeah! Age Tiger"), was performed by Serena Kōzuki, while the ending theme song, "Android ni Kubittake" (アンドロイドにくびったけ; "Crazy About an Android"), was performed by Brave Mental Orchestra. WWWave Corporation licensed the series for streaming on OceanVeil.

==== Episodes ====
No.	Title	Directed by	Storyboarded by	Original release date
1	"Makina is Discovered as a Robot"; Transliteration: "Makina-san ga Robotto da to Hanmei" (Japanese: マキナがロボットだと判明)	Masayoshi Nishida	Masayoshi Nishida	April 7, 2025
Popular high school student Makina Agatsuma is intrigued by her classmate Eita Akutsu saving a small robot from falling down the stairs and checks on him. He has a crush on her, but is too shy and devotes himself to making robots. Elsewhere, a female scientist oversees realistic androids in pods. Eita later goes to his apartment and finds Makina wearing only a blanket. She reveals she is an android and is damaged, then hands him her manual and asks him to repair her. Despite her parts being radically advanced, he repairs her and triggers a self-regenerating feature for her skin. She explains that she was designed for infiltration and seduction, but someone put a bomb in her apartment, and she went to him for his compassion for machines. She then shocks him by asking to have sex.
2	"Makina is In My Room"; Transliteration: "Kakushite, Makina-san wa Heya ni Iru" (Japanese: かくして、マキナさんは部屋にいる)	Kentaro Iino	Masayoshi Nishida	April 14, 2025
A classmate named Mamimi enjoys drawing and discussing yaoi with Makina. Eita later refuses Makina's advances, lecturing her that sex should only be with someone you love. This confuses Makina, who confesses she is a virgin and her only point of reference for sex is yaoi. She compliments Eita's mechanical skill and declares him her owner as she will live with him. He asks her to put on clothes, but she instead demonstrates her camouflage feature that creates an illusion of clothes. She lounges on his bed, reading a manga as he comments that her sexiness is bad for his heart.
3	"Makina Bathes with a Guy"; Transliteration: "Kakushite, Makina-san wa Kon'yoku Suru." (Japanese: かくして、マキナさんは混浴する。)	Masayoshi Nishida	Masayoshi Nishida	April 21, 2025
Eita learns Makina does not need food. She soon joins him in the bath and tries to bathe him, but accidentally crushes his genitals. As he tries to escape, her head and leg fall off from stress, so he repairs her again. She values her friendships at school, so she wants the repairs done as soon as possible. When he finishes and needs to sleep, they share the bed, and she hugs him before going into Sleep Mode, and he is unable to break her grip.
4	"Makina Gets a Uniform"; Transliteration: "Kakushite, Makina-san wa Seifuku o Eru" (Japanese: かくして、マキナさんは制服を得る)	Kentaro Iino	Masayoshi Nishida	April 28, 2025
Eita has an erotic dream about Makina. As she makes a big deal about his erection, his landlady confronts him about the noise, but assumes he was masturbating. Since her apartment was blown up, Makina calls Mamimi for a new school uniform, and they go to meet her at the park with Eita hiding. As they wait, Makina stretches, but her leg falls off from stress, so Eita drags her to the men's restroom to repair her. Mamimi arrives to see this, assumes from the noises that Makina is being assaulted, and bursts in to see Makina intact, but does not see Eita because he is crushed against the door. Makina makes her think it was a prank. Back in Eita's apartment, Makina changes into the uniform and tries to seduce him, but he refuses. His landlady confronts him about the noise again.
5	"Thus, Makina Can No Longer Hide"; Transliteration: "Kakushite, Makina-san wa Kakushikirenai." (Japanese: かくして、マキナさんは隠しきれない。)	Masayoshi Nishida	Masayoshi Nishida	May 5, 2025
Eita has another erotic dream about Makina. At school, she slips on a banana peel and her leg comes off, so they hide in a locker as he repairs her. Mamimi sees him watching over her and assumes he is a stalker. When Makina's leg comes loose again, she hides in the locker and calls Eita to get her, but Mamimi intercepts and threatens him with a stun gun until a teacher apprehends her. As school ends, Makina assumes she was abandoned. When Eita finally arrives, an upset Makina demands to have sex, but he refuses. In their struggle, her head falls off, so he carries her home, not noticing a young girl who spotted them and is intrigued.
6	"Thus, Makina is Taken"; Transliteration: "Kōshite Makina-san wa Tsuresarareru" (Japanese: こうしてマキナは連れ去られる)	Kentaro Iino	Masayoshi Nishida	May 12, 2025
Eita repairs Makina while she talks to Mamimi on the phone, but his actions make her orgasm, confusing Mamimi until Makina hangs up. Eita says her hip joint must be replaced so that her leg will stop falling off, but they do not know where to find replacements. Outside, Eita finds the girl who spotted them, who wet herself. He brings her inside so she can shower, then leaves. When Makina attempts to help her shower, the girl uses a banana peel to make her slip, then closes a door on her neck to trap her, gags her with her panties, then draws a knife. Hearing a commotion, Eita returns to find Makina's head and the girl's headless body. Makina reveals that the girl is also a robot, and she attached her head to Makina's body before escaping.
7	"Thus, the Sisters Trade Places"; Transliteration: "Kōshite, Shimai wa Tachiba o Kōkan Suru" (Japanese: こうして、姉妹は立場を交換する)	Yasuhiro Tomita	Masayoshi Nishida	May 19, 2025
A shocked Eita faints and has an erotic dream of Makina seducing him in a swimming pool before waking up. Makina reveals the girl is Mimika Imose, a sister unit who was the one who blew up her apartment and was jealous of Makina for having an adult body while she had the body of a child. He attaches Makina's head to Mimika's body, then considers leaving her like that before she insists on finding her body. Meanwhile, Mimika revels in her new adult body, but her leg falls off. Eita realizes Mimika did not leave through the door or window, so she must still be there. It is soon revealed that she was hiding in the dropped ceiling as she dives down and takes Eita hostage with a knife to his throat.
8	"Thus, Makina Becomes a Ghost Story"; Transliteration: "Kakushite, Makina-san wa Kaidan to Naru." (Japanese: かくして、マキナさんは怪談となる。)	Masayoshi Nishida	Masayoshi Nishida	May 26, 2025
Mimika denies blowing up Makina's apartment before she demands Eita repair her leg. He does, but his actions make her orgasm. Unable to handle it, she drops the knife and ejects her head, allowing Makina to swap their heads back. Makina converts her hand into a cannon and tries to destroy Mimika, but Eita stops her. Mimika gives a sob story about having no home, and Eita lets her live with them, making Makina berate him for his naïveté. When Mimika admits that the panties she gagged Makina with were stained with dog urine, Makina attacks her and they fight in the dropped ceiling, but Makina's head falls off. The landlady confronts Eita about the noise. When she sees Makina's head, however, she faints and falls on him. Mamimi then enters the apartment intending to beat Eita up, but she faints when she sees Eita and the landlady together. When they wake up and see each other, they both scream as Mamimi runs away. This causes the landlady to think the place is haunted.
9	"Thus, Makina Shares a Kiss"; Transliteration: "Kakushite, Makina-san wa Chū o Suru." (Japanese: かくして、マキナさんはちゅーをする。)	Yūma Kano & Ryūto Yasuhiro	Masayoshi Nishida	June 2, 2025
Eita has an erotic dream about both Makina and Mimika. He wakes up to find Mimika has disassembled Makina and stuffed her in the freezer. After fixing Makina, he falls for Mimika's story of only wanting to keep Makina's parts cool, so Makina yells at him for falling for her innocent act. They later go to school, where Mimika uses banana peels to trip up Makina, while Mamimi attacks Eita. Back home, they receive a package of new clothes for the girls, and Mimika kisses Eita on the cheek. As Makina gets jealous, Mimika learns that they have not kissed or had sex and mocks Makina for being a freeloader. Makina angrily grabs Eita and tries to kiss him, but is too embarrassed and tries to have sex. However, she stops since she still does not know how sex works.
10	"Thus, The Weapon Awakens"; Transliteration: "Kakushite, Sono Heiki wa Ugokidasu." (Japanese: かくして、その兵器は動き出す。)	Yasuhiro Tomita	Masayoshi Nishida	June 9, 2025
Eita uses a 3D printer to make a replacement hip joint for Makina, but it breaks since the material is not strong enough. Mimika suggests raiding the factory where they came from, but they do not remember where it is. They decide to check Makina's old hideout, but find a vacant lot where it was. The sisters reveal they had a third sister who was designed for warfare. Meanwhile, Mamimi spots them and, thinking Mimika is Eita and Makina's child, angrily charges, but they leave without noticing her. She hurls a rock in frustration, but the third sister, Alma Sakimori, emerges from the river and vaporizes it with a ray gun. Alma tries to kill Mamimi for seeing her, but since she is programmed not to attack humans, her head falls off. When Mamimi helps repair her, Alma calls her her owner. Mamimi asks Alma to help her defeat Eita, describing him as a pervert, only to realize Alma cannot because of her programming, while Alma becomes aroused imagining being in a pervert's clutches. Eita, Makina, and Mimika have fun sledding down a levee, but Eita spots Alma before they crash into a bush.
11	"Thus, Makina Gets Covered in Burrs"; Transliteration: "Kakushite, Makina-san wa Onamomiru." (Japanese: かくして、マキナさんはオナモミる。)	Kentaro Iino	Masayoshi Nishida	June 16, 2025
Mamimi bathes Alma, who explains how she ultimately ended up in the river. After realizing some forms of torture do not count as attacks, Mamimi gives Alma a dildo to use on Eita and shows her some yaoi, which Alma quickly become addicted to. Meanwhile, when Eita, Makina, and Mimika go home, they find burrs in Makina's hair. She tries to look up the burrs on her phone, but since she called them "sticklecocks", her content filter blocks her. She then ignorantly tries to use a burr on Eita as a sex toy, but he stops her. Since Eita needs money to make a new hip joint, Makina and Mimika try posting sexy pictures online, but Eita forbids it. They then decide to make a livestream, but Makina gets nervous and cannot figure out what to say. She then casually removes her head, causing a shocked Eita and Mimika to stop recording.
12	"Thus, Makina Does a Naughty Workout"; Transliteration: "Kakushite, Makina-san wa Ecchi na Undō o Suru." (Japanese: かくして、マキナさんはHな運動をする。)	Masayoshi Nishida	Masayoshi Nishida	June 23, 2025
Eita finally replaced Makina's hip joint. She later wakes him up for school, but hits him when he has an erection. Mamimi sees them together and wants to attack, but Alma is at the library reading yaoi. In P.E., the class plays tennis. Eita's opponent is Mamimi and Makina's opponent is Hana Suzuki, the class tennis champ. Mamimi deliberately hits Eita's face with the ball. Makina plays well against Hana until her hip joint malfunctions and makes her orgasm and lose. Makina excuses herself to the nurse's office while Mamimi, who thinks Eita put a vibrator in Makina, does the same. Eita sneaks away and he and Makina hide in the equipment room. He finds her pelvic area is jammed with gunk and cleans it with a vacuum cleaner, making her orgasm. Hana enters the room looking for spare balls and is traumatized, thinking they were having sex. Makina returns, but the teacher tells her to go back to the nurse's office because she is off-balance. Meanwhile, Mamimi is in the nurse's office wondering where Makina is. A narration says Eita and the others have many more adventures to come.

== See also ==
- Crossing Time, another manga series by Yoshimi Sato
