= Hamidashi Creative =

2020 video game

- Original cover for the visual novel

ハミダシクリエイティブ (Hamidashi Kurieitibu)
- Video game
- Developer: Madosoft
- Publisher: JP: Madosoft (Windows); JP: iMel (PS4, Switch); WW: Sekai Project (Windows)
- Genre: Eroge, Visual novel
- Platform: Windows, PlayStation 4, Nintendo Switch
- Released: Windows: JP: September 25, 2020; PlayStation 4, Nintendo Switch: JP: June 24, 2021
- Video game

Hamidashi Creative Totsu
- Developer: Madosoft
- Publisher: JP: Madosoft
- Genre: Eroge, Visual novel
- Platform: Windows
- Released: JP: November 25, 2022
- Anime television series
- Directed by: Hisayoshi Hirasawa (chief); Shige Fukase
- Written by: Kōichi Arisu
- Studio: Hayabusa Film
- Original network: Tokyo MX, SUN, TVA, KBS
- Original run: October 4, 2024 – December 20, 2024
- Episodes: 12
- Video game

Hamidashi Creative Re:Re:call
- Developer: Madosoft
- Publisher: JP: Madosoft
- Genre: Eroge, Visual novel
- Platform: Windows
- Released: JP: April 25, 2025

Hamidashi Creative (Japanese: ハミダシクリエイティブ, Hepburn: Hamidashi Kurieitibu), officially abbreviated as Hamikuri (ハミクリ), is a Japanese adult visual novel developed by Madosoft and released for Windows on September 25, 2020. It was later ported to the PlayStation 4 and Nintendo Switch in June 2021. A sequel to the visual novel titled Hamidashi Creative Totsu was released in November 2022. A short-form anime television series adaptation produced by Hayabusa Film aired from October to December 2024. A spin-off to the visual novel titled Hamidashi Creative Re:Re:call was released in April 2025.

== Characters ==
Tomohiro Izumi (和泉智宏, Izumi Tomohiro)
Hiyori Izumi (和泉妃愛, Izumi Hiyori)
Voiced by: Megumi Toda
Kano Tokiwa (常磐華乃, Tokiwa Kano)
Voiced by: Hotori Asami
Asumi Nishiki (錦あすみ, Nishiki Asumi)
Voiced by: Yukino Tsumugi
Sio Kamakura (鎌倉詩桜, Kamakura Sio)
Voiced by: Miki Horiba
Ameri Ryūkan (竜閑天梨, Ryūkan Ameri)
Voiced by: Rie Okamoto

== Jailbreak ==
In 2024, security researchers discovered that a specific save file for the PS4 version of Hamidashi Creative could be used as an entry point for a homebrew exploit.

== Adaptations ==
=== Anime ===
A 12-episode anime television series adaptation, created through a crowdfunding campaign, is produced by Hayabusa Film, chief directed by Hisayoshi Hirasawa, directed by Shige Fukase, written by Kōichi Arisu, and the character design was provided by Keiya Nakano based on Tsumire Utsunomiya's original design. It aired from October 4 to December 20, 2024 as a series of two-minute shorts. The series' theme song "Hayo, New World" is performed by Megu Sakuragawa.

== See also ==
- Wagamama High Spec, another visual novel developed by Madosoft
