= 180-Byō de Kimi no Mimi o Shiawase ni Dekiru ka? =

Japanese anime television series

- Key visual

180秒で君の耳を幸せにできるか?
- Genre: ASMR
- Created by: RaRo
- Anime television series
- Directed by: Yoshinobu Kasai
- Written by: Kien Aien
- Music by: Takaaki Nakahashi
- Studio: Ekachi Epilka; Indivision
- Original network: Tokyo MX
- Original run: October 15, 2021 – December 31, 2021
- Episodes: 12
- Related media
- Aru Asa Dummy Head Mike ni Natteita Ore-kun no Jinsei

180-Byō de Kimi no Mimi o Shiawase ni Dekiru ka? (180秒で君の耳を幸せにできるか?, "Can I Make Your Ears Happy in 180 Seconds?") is a Japanese original short anime television series about ASMR co-animated by Ekachi Epilka and Indivision and directed by Yoshinobu Kasai, with character designs provided by Takayuki Noguchi. The series aired from October to December 2021 on Tokyo MX. The anime's theme song is "Chuchoter" by Ayumi.

== Characters ==
Akari Sawake (澤家月光, Sawake Akari)
Voiced by: Shiori Mikami
Shūsui Kagami (鏡秋水, Kagami Shūsui)
Voiced by: Suzuko Mimori
Hikari Sawake (澤家陽光, Sawake Hikari)
Voiced by: Azumi Waki
Udoku Sawake (澤家雨読, Sawake Udoku)
Voiced by: Kanae Itō
Nanako (ナナコ)
Voiced by: Yu Serizawa
Kanako (カナコ)
Voiced by: Aoi Koga
Jirō (二郎)
Voiced by: Show Hayami

== Episode list ==
No.	Title	Original release date
1	"3 Minutes, Bamboo Made Earpick"; Transliteration: "Sanpunkan de, Take-sei Mimikaki" (Japanese: 3分間で、竹製耳かき)	October 15, 2021
2	"3 Minutes, Titanium Made Earpick"; Transliteration: "Sanpunkan de, Chitan-sei Mimikaki" (Japanese: 3分間で、チタン製耳かき)	October 22, 2021
3	"3 Minutes, Wind Chimes and Cicadas. Sound of Ice"; Transliteration: "Sanpunkan de, Fūrin to Semi. Kōri no Oto" (Japanese: 3分間で、風鈴と蝉。氷の音)	October 29, 2021
4	"3 Minutes, Carbonated Water"; Transliteration: "Sanpunkan de, Tansansui" (Japanese: 3分間で、炭酸水)	November 5, 2021
5	"3 Minutes, Baby Cotton Swab"; Transliteration: "Sanpunkan de, Akachan Menbō" (Japanese: 3分間で、赤ちゃん綿棒)	November 12, 2021
6	"3 Minutes, Cream"; Transliteration: "Sanpunkan de, Kurīmu" (Japanese: 3分間で、クリーム)	November 19, 2021
7	"3 Minutes, Squeeze"; Transliteration: "Sanpunkan de, Sukuīzu" (Japanese: 3分間で、スクイーズ)	November 26, 2021
8	"3 Minutes, Hard Boiled"; Transliteration: "Sanpunkan de, Hādo Boirudo" (Japanese: 3分間で、ハードボイルド)	December 3, 2021
9	"3 Minutes, OL's Life Sound"; Transliteration: "Sanpunkan de, Ō Eru no Seikatsuon" (Japanese: 3分間で、OLの生活音)	December 10, 2021
10	"3 Minutes, Become a Baby"; Transliteration: "Sanpunkan de, Akachan ni Narō" (Japanese: 3分間で、赤ちゃんになろう)	December 17, 2021
11	"3 Minutes, Electric Earpick"; Transliteration: "Sanpunkan de, Dendō Mimikaki" (Japanese: 3分間で、電動耳かき)	December 24, 2021
12	"3 Minutes, Everyone Gathers for the Final Episode"; Transliteration: "Sanpunkan de, Saishūkai Dashi Zen'in Shūgō" (Japanese: 3分間で、最終回だし全員集合)	December 31, 2021
