= Aru Asa Dummy Head Mike ni Natteita Ore-kun no Jinsei =

Japanese anime television series

- Key visual

ある朝ダミーヘッドマイクになっていた俺クンの人生 (Aru Asa Damī Heddo Maiku ni Natteita Ore-kun no Jinsei)
- Genre: ASMR, comedy, yuri
- Created by: RaRo
- Anime television series
- Directed by: Yoshinobu Kasai
- Written by: Kien Aien
- Music by: Miki Nomiyama
- Studio: Ekachi Epilka; Indivision
- Original network: Tokyo MX
- Original run: October 13, 2022 – December 29, 2022
- Episodes: 12
- Related media
- 180-Byō de Kimi no Mimi o Shiawase ni Dekiru ka?

Aru Asa Dummy Head Mike ni Natteita Ore-kun no Jinsei (ある朝ダミーヘッドマイクになっていた俺クンの人生, Aru Asa Damī Heddo Maiku ni Natteita Ore-kun no Jinsei; "My Life After I Became a Dummy Head Microphone One Morning") is a Japanese original short anime television series co-animated by Ekachi Epilka and Indivision and directed by Yoshinobu Kasai. Original character designs were provided by cura, while Yoshinori Ōtsuka adapted the designs for animation. The series aired from October to December 2022 on Tokyo MX. The anime's theme song is "Katachi ni Dekinai Monologue" by Kotoko.

== Characters ==
Ore-kun (俺クン)
Voiced by: Tomokazu Sugita
A former salaryman whose consciousness inhabits various inanimate objects and animals.
Yuri Asakusa (浅草ゆり, Asakusa Yuri)
Voiced by: Saori Ōnishi
A second-year high school student in the ASMR Club.
Panda Kuramae (蔵前ぱんだ, Kuramae Panda)
Voiced by: Akari Kitō
A second-year high school student who is Yuri's best friend. She harbours feelings of affection towards Yuri.
Ume Toranomon (虎ノ門うめ, Toranomon Ume)
Voiced by: Mayu Sagara
A first-year high school student.
Tsurugi Kanegafuchi (鐘ヶ淵つるぎ, Kanegafuchi Tsurugi)
Voiced by: Lynn
A third-year high school student and the chairwoman of the school's disciplinary committee.
Toto Asakusa (浅草とと, Asakusa Toto)
Voiced by: Miyu Kubota
Yuri's younger sister.
Kaori Asakusa (浅草かおり, Asakusa Kaori)
Voiced by: Kaori Mizuhashi
Yuri and Toto's mother.

== Episodes ==
No.	Title	Original release date
1	"I'm going to be a Dummy Head Microphone."; Transliteration: "Ore-kun, Damī Heddo Maiku ni Naru." (Japanese: 俺クン、ダミーヘッドマイクになる。)	October 13, 2022
A salaryman who had died after being hit by a truck finds himself reincarnated as a dummy head microphone in a high school club room.
2	"I'll Be Your Bicycle Saddle."; Transliteration: "Ore-kun, Jitensha no Sadoru ni Naru." (Japanese: 俺クン、自転車のサドルになる。)	October 20, 2022
Ore-kun discovers that he has suddenly become the seat of a bicycle belonging to Panda.
3	"I'm Going to Be Crispy Chicken."; Transliteration: "Ore-kun, Paripari Chikin ni Naru." (Japanese: 俺クン、パリパリチキンになる。)	October 27, 2022
Now a chicken in a chicken farm, Ore-kun is carried away by a worker and turned into fried chicken, which Yuri, Ume, and Panda eat in the club room.
4	"I Will Become a Pillow."; Transliteration: "Ore-kun, Makura ni Naru." (Japanese: 俺クン、枕になる。)	November 3, 2022
Ore-kun has become Yuri's pillow during a video call between Yuri and Panda.
5	"I Will Become a Pacifier."; Transliteration: "Ore-kun, Oshaburi ni Naru." (Japanese: 俺クン、おしゃぶりになる。)	November 10, 2022
Much to his chagrin, Ore-kun is now a pacifier, spending time in Ume's mouth as the girls play house with Yuri's little sister Toto.
6	"I'm Going to Be a Ruler."; Transliteration: "Ore-kun, Monosashi ni Naru." (Japanese: 俺クン、物差しになる。)	November 17, 2022
Ore-kun becomes a tape measure belonging to Tsurugi Kanegafuchi, the uptight disciplinary committee chairwoman.
7	"I'm Going to Be a Multidimensional Space-Time Anomaly."; Transliteration: "Ore-kun, Tajigen-teki Toki Kūkan Ijō ni Naru." (Japanese: 俺クン、多次元的時空間異常になる。)	November 24, 2022
Ore-kun finds himself adrift in space as Tsurugi dreams about Yuri's mother flirting with her.
8	"I'm Going to Be a Condenser Mic."; Transliteration: "Ore-kun, Kondensā Maiku ni Naru." (Japanese: 俺クン、コンデンサーマイクになる。)	December 1, 2022
With Ore-kun as a condenser microphone, Panda recites a horror story.
9	"I Will Become Amber Candy."; Transliteration: "Ore-kun, Kohakutō ni Naru." (Japanese: 俺クン、琥珀糖になる。)	December 8, 2022
As kohakutō candy, Ore-kun witnesses a conversation between Toto and Ume in the former's room.
10	"I'm Going to Be a Puppy."; Transliteration: "Ore-kun, Koinu ni Naru." (Japanese: 俺クン、子犬になる。)	December 15, 2022
Ore-kun becomes a puppy and is soon adopted by Yuri and her mother, with Yuri intrigued by the dog's intelligence.
11	"I'm Going to Be a Dummy Head Microphone. 2"; Transliteration: "Ore-kun, Damī Heddo Maiku ni Naru. 2" (Japanese: 俺クン、ダミーヘッドマイクになる。2)	December 22, 2022
His consciousness having returned to the ASMR Club's dummy head microphone, Ore-kun finds himself at the centre of a king game between Yuri, Panda, and Ume.
12	"I'm Going to Be a Dummy Head (Ultimate Perfect Body)."; Transliteration: "Ore-kun, Damī Heddo (Kyūkyoku Kanzen-tai) ni Naru." (Japanese: 俺クン、ダミーヘッド（究極完全体）になる。)	December 29, 2022
As Panda struggles to give Yuri chocolates on Valentine's Day, Ore-kun (as the dummy head microphone) appears behind her and transforms into a dummy-headed humanoid clad in a black zentai suit. Proclaiming himself the girls' guardian spirit, he carries Panda to Yuri, disappearing without a trace immediately after.
