= Crossing Time =

Japanese manga series

- Cover of Fumikiri Jikan volume 1 by Futabasha

踏切時間 (Fumikiri Jikan)
- Genre: Slice of life
- Manga
- Written by: Yoshimi Sato
- Published by: Futabasha
- Magazine: Monthly Action
- Original run: May 25, 2016 – September 25, 2021
- Volumes: 8
- Anime television series
- Directed by: Yoshio Suzuki
- Written by: Misuzu Chiba
- Studio: Ekachi Epilka
- Licensed by: Crunchyroll
- Original network: Tokyo MX
- Original run: April 10, 2018 – June 26, 2018
- Episodes: 12

Crossing Time (Japanese: 踏切時間, Hepburn: Fumikiri Jikan; lit. "Railroad Crossing Time") is a Japanese manga series by Yoshimi Sato. It was serialized in Futabasha's seinen manga magazine Monthly Action from May 2016 to September 2021 and was collected in eight tankōbon volumes. An anime television series adaptation by Ekachi Epilka aired from April to June 2018.

== Characters ==
Ai (アイ)
Voiced by: Sayaka Senbongi
Tomo (トモ)
Voiced by: Yui Ogura
Mashima (真島)
Voiced by: Yuri Komagata
Tanishi (田西)
Voiced by: Kazuki Matsunaga
Misaki Komaba (駒場 みさき, Komaba Misaki)
Voiced by: Suzuna Kinoshita
Takashi Komaba (駒場 たかし, Komaba Takashi)
Voiced by: Mitsuhiro Ichiki
Utako (詩子)
Voiced by: Yu Ayase
Kurobe (黒部)
Voiced by: Mariko Honda
Teacher (先生, Sensei)
Voiced by: Yasuhiro Mamiya
Akemi (あけみ)
Voiced by: Kazusa Aranami
Hassaku Oji-san (はっさくおじさん)
Voiced by: Norio Wakamoto
Yukiko (雪子)
Voiced by: Yukari Tamura
Saiki (斉木)
Voiced by: Ken Narita

== Media ==
=== Manga ===
Crossing Time is written and illustrated by Yoshimi Sato. It was serialized in Futabasha's Monthly Action magazine from May 25, 2016, to September 25, 2021. Eight tankōbon volumes was released from December 12, 2016 to December 9, 2021.

No.	Release date	ISBN
1	December 12, 2016	978-4-57-584896-0
2	May 12, 2017	978-4-57-584972-1
3	March 12, 2018	978-4-57-585123-6
4	June 12, 2018	978-4-57-585168-7
5	March 12, 2019	978-4-57-585279-0
6	December 12, 2019	978-4-57-585392-6
7	September 12, 2020	978-4-57-585488-6
8	December 9, 2021	978-4-575-85665-1

=== Anime ===
An anime television series adaptation was announced in the March 2018 issue of Monthly Action, published on January 25, 2018. It is produced by Ekachi Epilka and directed by Yoshio Suzuki, with Misuzu Chiba handling the series' scripts, and Kaori Takamura designing the characters. Yuri Komagata performed the opening theme song "Tomare no Susume". It aired on Tokyo MX from April 10 to June 26, 2018. (Note: Tokyo MX lists the series premiere at 25:15 on April 9, 2018, which is effectively 1:15 a.m. JST on April 10.) Crunchyroll streamed the series.

No.	Title (Note: All English titles are taken from Crunchyroll.)	Original release date
1	"Their Youth"; Transliteration: "Futari no Seishun" (Japanese: 二人の青春)	April 10, 2018
2	"Majima Eriko Is Sexy"; Transliteration: "Majima-san wa Eroi" (Japanese: 真島さんはエロい)	April 17, 2018
3	"Together With Sensei"; Transliteration: "Sensei to Issho" (Japanese: 先生といっしょ)	April 24, 2018
4	"SNS Siblings"; Transliteration: "SNS Kyōdai" (Japanese: SNS兄妹)	May 1, 2018
5	"Goth Ordeals"; Transliteration: "Gosu Junan" (Japanese: ゴス受難)	May 8, 2018
6	"Mr. Hassaku and I"; Transliteration: "Watashi to Hassaku Ojisan" (Japanese: 私とはっさくおじさん)	May 15, 2018
7	"Railroad Crossing Poet"; Transliteration: "Fumikiri no Poeto" (Japanese: 踏切のポエト)	May 22, 2018
8	"SNS Siblings 2"; Transliteration: "SNS Kyōdai 2" (Japanese: SNS兄妹②)	May 29, 2018
9	"Heart of the City Train Part 1"; Transliteration: "Toden Kokoro-jō Zenpen" (Japanese: 都電こころ状 前編)	June 5, 2018
10	"Heart of the City Train Part 2"; Transliteration: "Toden Kokoro-jō Kōhen" (Japanese: 都電こころ状 後編)	June 12, 2018
11	"Majima Eriko Is Sexy Part 2"; Transliteration: "Majima-san wa Eroi 2" (Japanese: 真島さんはエロい②)	June 19, 2018
12	"Their Youth Part 2"; Transliteration: "Futari no Seishun 2" (Japanese: 二人の青春②)	June 26, 2018

== See also ==
- Makina-san's a Love Bot?!, another manga series by Yoshimi Sato
