= Megu Sakuragawa =

Japanese singer and voice actress

- 櫻川めぐ
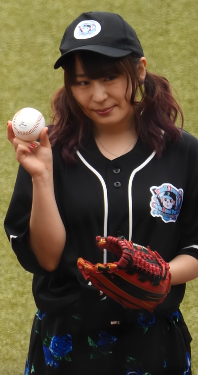
- Sakuragawa at a BanG Dream! promotion with Pacific League baseball in 2018
- Born: Sakuragawa, Ibaraki Prefecture, Japan
- Other name: Meguchi
- Occupations: Singer; voice actress
- Years active: 2008–present
- Agent: S Inc
- Height: 153 cm (5 ft 0 in)
- Musical career
- Genres: J-Pop
- Instruments: Vocals; drums
- Label: Lantis
- Member of: Roselia

Megu Sakuragawa (櫻川 めぐ, Sakuragawa Megu) is a Japanese singer, voice actress, and drummer from Ibaraki Prefecture, Japan. She is better known as Tsubasa Kira from Love Live! and Ako Udagawa from BanG Dream!, the latter of which involves playing drums for the band Roselia. She is currently affiliated with S.

== Works ==
=== Anime ===
- Armed Blue Gunvolt – Cyan, Morpho
- BanG Dream! – Ako Udagawa
- Love Live! School Idol Project Series – Kira Tsubasa
- Teppen!!!!!!!!!!!!!!! Laughing 'til You Cry – Miyu Komatsuzaki
- Wagamama High Spec – Sakuragi Ashe Rufflette
- Yahari Ore no Seishun Love Comedy wa Machigatteiru. – Yokko and Yukko

=== Games ===
- BanG Dream! Girls Band Party! – Ako Udagawa
- Mahou Shoujo Lyrical Nanoha A's PORTABLE -THE BATTLE OF ACES-
- Idol Incidents – Kazuna Yasuda
- Corpse Seed 3 – Rinon Durandal
- Corpse Seed 3: Heartclub Extreme – Rinon Durandal
- Corpse Seed 4: Endless Brawl – Rinon Durandal
- Hakoniwa No Folclore – Majo Korone
- Azure Striker Gunvolt – Joule/Lumen
- Azure Striker Gunvolt 2 – Joule
- Azure Striker Gunvolt 3 – Lumen
- Gunvolt Records Cychronicle – Lumen

=== Songs ===
- "Brave Blade" (Campione! opening)
- "Private Wars" (with Maho Matsunaga, Ayuru Ohashi)
- "Shocking Party" (with Maho Matsunaga, Ayuru Ohashi)
- "Unreal Creation!" (Hamidashi Creative visual novel opening)
- "Itsusatsu no Arō" (Hamidashi Creative Totsu visual novel opening)
- "Hayo, New World." (Hamidashi Creative anime ending)
