= Chiyo Ousaki =

Japanese voice actress and singer

- 桜咲 千依
- Born: 12 February 1988 (age 38); Kanagawa Prefecture, Japan
- Occupations: Voice actress; singer; DJ
- Years active: 2012–present
- Notable work: Sara Rukawa in Da Capo III; Koume Shirasaka in The Idolmaster Cinderella Girls; Mihiro Miyase in Wagamama High Spec.

Chiyo Ousaki (桜咲 千依, Ōsaki Chiyo; born 12 February 1988) is a Japanese voice actress, singer, and DJ from Kanagawa Prefecture. She is known for voicing Sara Rukawa in Da Capo III, Koume Shirasaka in The Idolmaster Cinderella Girls, and Mihiro Miyase in Wagamama High Spec.

== Biography ==
Chiyo Ousaki, a native of Kanagawa Prefecture, was born on 12 February 1988. Although she was primarily a stage actor during her childhood, a voice training instructor of hers recommended a voice acting career because of her "unique voice". After going to a voice acting event as a high school student, she became seriously interested in voice acting as a profession. Despite being affiliated to an agency, Ousaki enrolled in Tokyo Announcement Academy to study the basics of voice acting. After graduating, she started her first job was as a radio show assistant and began voice acting in original net animation. In March 2011, she changed the script of her given name from hiragana (ちよ) to kanji (千依).

In 2013, Ousaki voiced Sara Rukawa in the anime adaptation of the 2012 visual novel Da Capo III and was one of the five singers of the series' opening theme "Sakura Happy Innovation". In February 2016, she was cast as Mihiro Miyase in Wagamama High Spec. In June 2019, she was cast as Mink in Demon Lord, Retry!.

She voices Koume Shirasaka in The Idolmaster Cinderella Girls, a sub-franchise in The Idolmaster franchise. Since then, she has performed as a singer on several Idolmaster music releases, including the 2013 single "The Idolmaster Cinderella Master 022: Koume Shirasaka" (which charted at #12 in the Oricon Singles Chart) and the 2023 single The Idolmaster Cinderella Girls Starlight Master R/Lock On! 17: Kaidan Mairi (which charted at #19 in the Oricon Singles Chart).

On 11 February 2015, her mini-album "Nanairo" was released from Volare Vox; the mini-album's six songs included theme music she had performed for such media as anime shorts and web series. She is also a member of the bands C+ and Ichidars no Ongakutai (alongside Satoshi Henmi). In June 2016, she made her first appearance as a DJ, performing at the Cosunon DJ party at Fai Aoyama. In March 2017, she and Hachiōji-P were the guest DJs at "Anisong DJ Fes: Mirai" at Y-Studio in Chai Wan, Hong Kong.

== Filmography ==
=== Anime ===
2013

- Da Capo III, Sara Rukawa

2015

- The Idolmaster Cinderella Girls, Koume Shirasaka

2016

- Wagamama High Spec, Mihiro Miyase

2017

- The Idolmaster Cinderella Girls Theater, Koume Shirasaka

2019

- Demon Lord, Retry!, Mink

=== Video games ===
2012

- Da Capo III, Sara Rukawa
- PhaseD, Natsuki Takamine

2013

- Gaku Ou: The Royal Seven Stars, Annemarie Lohenstein

2015

- Hitotsu Tobashi Ren'ai, Kurenai Saegusa

2019

- Arknights, Popukar

== Discography ==
Title	Year	Single details	Peak chart positions		Sales
Title	Year	Single details	JPN	JPN Hot	Sales
"The Idolmaster Cinderella Master 022: Koume Shirasaka"	2013	Released: 13 November 2013; Label: Nippon Columbia	12	—	—
"—" denotes releases that did not chart or were not released in that region.
