= Da Capo III =

Japanese visual novel

- Da Capo III original visual novel cover featuring Himeno Katsuragi (left) and Ricca Morizono (right).

～ダ・カーポIII～ (Da Kāpo III)
- Genre: Fantasy, Harem, Romantic comedy
- Video game
- Developer: Circus
- Publisher: JP: Circus; WW: MangaGamer
- Genre: Visual novel
- Platform: Windows, PSP, Linux, macOS
- Released: Windows: JP: April 27, 2012; PSP: JP: February 28, 2013; Linux, macOS, Windows: WW: January 20, 2017; Switch, PS4: WW: August 24, 2023
- Manga
- Written by: Circus
- Illustrated by: Yuka Kayura
- Published by: Kadokawa Shoten
- Magazine: Comptiq
- Original run: April 10, 2012 – present
- Manga
- Written by: Circus
- Illustrated by: Nonoka Hinata
- Published by: ASCII Media Works
- Magazine: Dengeki G's Magazine
- Original run: September 2012 – present
- Anime television series
- Directed by: Kenichi Ishikura
- Written by: Kenichi Ishikura
- Music by: Ryosuke Nakanishi
- Studio: Actas (Note: Credited as Kazami Gakuen Kōshiki Dōga-bu (風見学園公式動画部名義))
- Licensed by: NA: Crunchyroll
- Original network: Tokyo MX, TVA, MBS, BS11, AT-X, Sun TV
- Original run: January 5, 2013 – March 30, 2013
- Episodes: 13
- Other games
- Da Capo (predecessor); Da Capo II (predecessor); Da Capo 4 (sequel)

Da Capo III (〜ダ・カーポ III〜, Da Kāpo III; abbreviated as D.C. III) is a Japanese visual novel developed by Circus that was released in limited and regular editions on April 27, 2012, as a DVD for Windows and is rated for ages 15 and up. It is the third main installment of the Da Capo visual novel franchise, after Da Capo and Da Capo II. The story takes place 20 years after the events from Da Capo II. The gameplay in Da Capo III follows a branching plot line which offers pre-determined scenarios with courses of interaction, and focuses on the five female main characters. A 13-episode anime adaptation aired between January and March 2013.

== Gameplay ==
Da Capo III is a romance visual novel in which the player assumes the role of Kiyotaka Yoshino. Much of its gameplay is spent on reading the story's narrative and dialogue. Da Capo III follows a branching plot line with multiple endings, and depending on the decisions that the player makes during the game, the plot will progress in a specific direction. There are five main plot lines that the player will have the chance to experience, one for each of the heroines in the story. After the completion of the first four heroine routes, an additional scenario called Zero is made available, which revolves around Aoi Hinomoto, another heroine of the game. After Zero is finished, another route is made available. Throughout gameplay, the player is given multiple options to choose from, and text progression pauses at these points until a choice is made. To view all plot lines in their entirety, the player will have to replay the game multiple times and choose different choices to further the plot to an alternate direction.

== Plot ==
Da Capo III occurs about 20 years after Da Capo II on Hatsune island, once famous for its everlasting cherry trees. Ricca Morizono, president of Kazami Academy's official newspaper club, is determined to prove the existence of magic along with Kiyotaka Yoshino, the only male member of the club. There are four other girls in the club: Himeno Katsuragi, Kiyotaka's childhood friend; Charles Yoshino, Kiyotaka's cousin; Sara Rukawa, a transfer student; and Aoi Hinomoto, a frail but energetic part-timer. One day, Ricca suggests they should visit the rumored magical cherry tree to test its power by making a wish together. It suddenly blooms once again to their surprise, and all receive an unknown text message from the distant past telling them to fulfill a promise. In the following days investigating the source of the message, they begin to gain recollection of the events of their previous life. They are ultimately greeted by Sakura Yoshino, who tells them about their previous life in 1950.

All but Aoi were students in an underground magical school in London known as "The Weather Vane" or "Kazamidori". London was surrounded by a mysterious magical fog driving magicians out of control at that time, and Sakura Yoshino who was supposed to live in the 21st century was also teleported to 1950s London. Kiyotaka helped settle several incidents and was elected member of the student's council. The player is given a choice to develop a romance relationship with Ricca, Charles, Himeno or Sara. After clearing all four routes, the player advances into the Zero chapter.

In Zero, it is revealed that the magic fog is summoned by Aoi, who insists that she does not own magical power. Aoi foresees that she will die in a future summer. Terrified, she uses a spell to make the world loop between November 1950 and April 1951. The spell makes the fog to appear and brings Sakura to the past. Kiyotaka encourages Aoi to face the future, but they fail to dissipate the fog at the end of April 1951, causing them to loop once again.

Aoi tells everyone about the problem in chapter Da Capo, and the spell is dissipated with the help of everyone in Weather Vane, sending Sakura back to future. The magicians seal their memories into the cherry blossom tree, scheduled to be released when they reunion under the tree. They also make a promise to hanami when cherry reblossoms. After that they loop back one last time to live a life without fog and time loop. The promise brings everyone's reincarnation to Hatsune island to reunite with Sakura, and the game ends with everyone doing hanami with her.

== Development and release ==
Da Capo III is the 52nd title developed by the visual novel developer Circus. The game's production was headed by Tororo, president of Circus. The scenario was written by two people: Kōta Takeuchi and Chihare Ameno, who is also the game's director. Character design and art direction for the game was split between two artists: Natsuki Tanihara and Yuki Takano. Music in the game is performed by four artists: CooRie, Yozuca, Aimi and Suzuko Mimori.

Da Capo III was first announced on November 1, 2009, at Circus' 10th Anniversary Premium Concert and Announcement event as one of the ten Da Capo-related announcements made at the event, and was formally unveiled in the August 2011 issue of Dengeki G's Magazine. Da Capo III was released on April 27, 2012, in limited and regular editions, playable as a DVD for Windows and is rated for ages 15 and up. The limited edition came bundled with an original illustration booklet, the game's original soundtrack album, and a promotional card from the Weiß Schwarz collectible card game.

Da Capo III was ported to the PlayStation Portable by Kadokawa Games under the title Da Capo III Plus released on February 28, 2013. An updated version of the original game with additional story and visuals titled Da Capo III R was released on May 24, 2013, for Windows and is rated for ages 15 and up. An adult version of Da Capo III R titled Da Capo III R: X-rated was released on May 31, 2013. A sequel titled Da Capo III: Platinum Partner was released on April 25, 2014. Another sequel titled Da Capo III: With you was released on September 30, 2016, and another sequel titled Da Capo III: Dream Days was released on September 29, 2017.

MangaGamer released a demo of an English version of Da Capo III for Linux, macOS and Windows on December 23, 2016, and the full version was released on January 20, 2017, in both all-ages and adult versions. The all-ages version was also released on Steam.

Under the title D.C. III P.S. ~Da Capo III~ Plus Story and published by Entergram, further ports for the Nintendo Switch and PlayStation 4 was released on August 24, 2023.

== Adaptations ==
=== Internet radio show ===
An Internet radio show to promote Da Capo III titled Kazami Gakuen Shinbun-bu (風見学園新聞部, Kazami Academy Newspaper Club) had a pre-broadcast on January 5, 2012, and began regular broadcasting on February 2, 2012. The show is streamed online every Thursday, and is produced by the Japanese Internet radio station Hibiki. The show is hosted by the voice actresses of the five heroines in Da Capo III: Erika Kaihō as Aoi Hinomoto, Mikoi Sasaki as Himeno Katsuragi, Emi Nitta as Ricca Morizono, Ui Miyazaki as Charles Yoshino, and Chiyo Ousaki as Sara Rukawa.

=== Manga ===
A manga adaptation illustrated by Yuka Kayura began serialization in the May 2012 issue of Kadokawa Shoten's Comptiq magazine. A second manga illustrated by Nonoka Hinata began serialization in the September 2012 issue of ASCII Media Works' Dengeki G's Magazine.

=== Anime ===
A 13-episode anime adaptation, produced by the anime production committee Kazami Gakuen Kōshiki Dōga-bu (a pseudonym for Actas) and directed by Kenichi Ishikura, aired between January 5 and March 30, 2013.

No.	Title	Original release date
1	"Blooming Cherry Blossoms"; Transliteration: "Sakura Saku" (Japanese: サクラサク)	January 5, 2013
On the island of Hatsune-jima, 20 years after it was once well known for its blooming everlasting cherry blossom trees, the official Kazami Academy newspaper club members: Kiyotaka Yoshino, his cousin Charles Yoshino, his neighbor Himeno Katsuragi, the club president Ricca Morizono, Sara Rukawa, and Aoi Hinomoto decide "magic" to be their article theme in order to beat their rival, Suginami, the president of the unofficial newspaper club. They pay a visit to the dead cherry blossom tree in Sakura Park, rumored to be magic in the past. When they make a wish, the cherry blossom tree suddenly blooms much to everybody's surprise. At that moment, they all received a text message that says "When the cherry blossoms bloom, at that promised place..." from an unknown sender dated in 1951. The next morning, while the islanders are excited by the cherry blossom trees blooming again the two clubs accept a duel to unravel the mystery of the cherry blossom tree with Kiyotaka's partnership on the bet. Sakura Yoshino makes an appearance at the cherry blossom tree.
2	"Warm Place"; Transliteration: "Atataka na Tokoro" (Japanese: あたたかなところ)	January 12, 2013
Sakura walks around in confusion. Kiyotaka and his friend Kōsuke Edogawa discuss about girls. Ricca commences investigation on the cherry blossom tree. Charles tries to persuade Kiyotaka to make her his own home made cooking and soon later succeeds when Kiyotaka promises to do so. However, it turns out Aoi lost her keys while they were gathering info so she, Himeno, Sara, and Kiyotaka split up looking for them. Fortunately they were found, but Kiyotaka has accidentally broken his promise with Charles without realizing. He comes home late at their apartment to find a slightly annoyed Charles but she seems to quickly forgive him by taking a bath with him before he apologizes properly.
3	"Where Cherry Blossoms Flutter"; Transliteration: "Sakura Mau Tokoro" (Japanese: さくら舞うところ)	January 19, 2013
Kiyotaka meets the mysterious Sakura and later he coincidentally saves her from falling and afterwards she thanks him. He searches through records on strange phenomena of incidents that happened before the cherry blossom tree withered 20 years ago. Mikoto tells him that the unofficial club is also ancient. Then on the same day, Kiyotaka and Sakura meet for the third time by the blooming cherry blossom tree. Kiyotaka helps her find her lost cat Utamaru, when they find her Kiyotaka brings her to a sweet shop for a treat. They become closer as the day slowly ends.
4	"A Place One Wants to Be Forever"; Transliteration: "Itsumademo Itai Tokoro" (Japanese: いつまでもいたいところ)	January 26, 2013
Kiyotaka is on the bus with Himeno, with an awkward atmosphere since the past events in the morning; Kiyotaka went in Himeno's bedroom without permission and sees her undressed, which infuriated her. The bus stops suddenly and Kiyotaka saves Himeno from falling and she thanks him. In the club room they decipher the information they have gather so far, which leads to the former principal of Kazami Academy who resembles Sakura that disappeared 20 years ago, much to Kiyotaka's surprise. Later that day, Sakura and Kiyotaka end up playing together in the park after he finds her spying on him, she notices Kiyotaka is daydreaming while looking slightly lonely. Himeno invites him out in the evening where the two take a walk alone. Kiyotaka admits he feels unfortunate because he is spending a lot less time with her which touches Himeno. She insists on holding hands with Kiyotaka and he agrees to.
5	"A Place Where One Is Not Alone"; Transliteration: "HItori Janai Tokoro" (Japanese: ひとりじゃないところ)	February 2, 2013
Sara and Kiyotaka go to the library together for research. On the way, Charles jumps on him that causes a misunderstanding made Sara shout at him and runs off. Throughout the school day, Sara avoids Kiyotaka until he helps her clean up on duty. They accidentally get themselves locked in the gym equipment room together but they use this time to talk to each other. Sara reveals the reason she enrolled to Kazami Academy was because of a future dream her parents had foreseen. But things take a turn for the worse when Sara starts to need to use the restroom badly. Luckily, Himeno finds them just in time but this causes yet another misunderstanding. Later, they both of them go to the softball club. Sakura helps Kiyotaka pick up balls. He found Sara later taking nap under the cherry blossom tree.
6	"A Place Where We Can Be Together"; Transliteration: "Futari de Ireru Tokoro" (Japanese: ふたりでいれるところ)	February 9, 2013
Ricca and Kiyotaka eat lunch together in the club room leaving Kōsuke and the male students jealous. Ricca tells him it bothers her how little time he spends with her and the amount he spends with the other girls assisting them. When Suginami tries to convince Kiyotaka into sharing and exchanging information, Ricca comes along and says he has to beat the unofficial newspaper club. At the end of the day, Kiyotaka and Ricca go around town having fun looking at magic material and clothes, and talk about past lives like lovers. Sakura is finally introduced to Kiyotaka's friends.
7	"A Place Where I Can Rely on You"; Transliteration: "Amaerareru Tokoro" (Japanese: あまえられるところ)	February 16, 2013
The club members examine on Sakura being related to Sakura Yoshino, but are unsure compare to her age. Kiyotaka notices Aoi's fever and takes care of her for the day, including change her clothes! The next day, Aoi is absent at school so Kiyotaka visits her, where she asks him to spoil her once more by cooking and sleeping with her. Coming home late in the morning without a notice has Himeno worrying about him.
8	"The Place Overflowing with Love, Dreams, and Hope"; Transliteration: "Ai to Yume to Kibō ga Afureru Tokoro" (Japanese: 愛と夢と希望が溢れる場所)	February 23, 2013
Everyone goes to a water resort. Kiyotaka has won tickets to it in a lottery, and even invites Sakura. The girls try to get Kiyotaka's attention by seeing who is most attractive but Sakura keeps dragging him away. He also finds Mikoto, Kōsuke and his sister Shiki there observing them. They then participate in a swimsuit competition held there. Sakura steps in when Ricca accidentally loses her top. In the end, Sakura wins and earns a Japanese confectionery set. In the sun setting, she encounters Minatsu Amakase who recognizes her.
9	"A Nice Place for a Young Girls' Festival and a Sunset"; Transliteration: "Bishōjo Matsuri to Yūhi ga Kirei na Tokoro" (Japanese: 美少女祭りと夕日が綺麗な場所)	March 2, 2013
After Kiyotaka and Kōsuke have an unknown conversation with Suginami. Shiki and the student council seize them for questioning, Suginami manages to free Kiyotaka somehow. After school, the student council yet insists Kiyotaka to talk and runs in hot pursuit. The next day, he accompanies Mikoto to a theme park where things go wild. At night, Suginami gives Kiyotaka an address regarding to the Amakase Detective Agency.
10	"Where Two People Have Just Come"; Transliteration: "Futari ga Tadoritsuita Tokoro" (Japanese: ふたりがたどりついたところ)	March 9, 2013
Kiyotaka meets Minatsu, Yuzu Kohinata (who knew Nanaka Shirakawa), and Yuuhi Takanashi at the Amakase Detective Agency. He listens to their explanation of robots then later requests about the cherry blossom tree's magic. The club members continue their discussion of magic of the cherry blossom trees. Kiyotaka shows the agencies the strange text message, learns of Minatsu's past and theories of magic. At school, he and Ricca have lunch together, she trips on top of him and shared a kiss. Later, they found Sakura and when Ricca touched her they see a vision of themselves meeting.
11	"Place of Memories and Beginnings"; Transliteration: "Omoide to Hajimari no Tokoro" (Japanese: 思い出と始まりの場所)	March 16, 2013
Sakura walks in a rainy night as the memories of Jun'ichi Asakura sadden her. Ricca also confuse with sudden influx of memories she'd remembered. After seeing Sakura in the rain Himeno goes searches for her then called Kiyotaka for help. Ricca touches the eternal cherry blossom tree and remembers past memories of her and Kiyotaka living as a family when they first planted the tree. Sakura arrives at the old Asakura and Yoshino residence and remembers more of Jun'ichi and Nemu back in the day. Ricca found Sakura and tells a story about her life as a magician and her friend Jill. Then the sun rises through the clouds. Sakura decides to keep moving forward.
12	"Place of the Unwithering Cherry Blossom Trees"; Transliteration: "Karenai Sakura ga Aru Tokoro" (Japanese: 枯れない桜がある島)	March 23, 2013
Everyone gathers to meet Sakura saying she made a decision to leave the island until after having fun together with everyone once more. They took pictures, have cake, playing in the ocean, sightseeing all of Hatsune-jima. Ricca lets Sakura be alone with Kiyotaka as a date by going to different sites, then Kazami Academy seeing the school is prepare for the graduation ceremony. Finally, at the eternal cherry blossom tree Sakura reveals the memories of her and Jun'ichi to Kiyotaka. Sakura disappears and reunites with Jun'ichi. Afterward, the club members receive another text message from Sakura.
13	"Da Capo"; Transliteration: "Da Kāpo" (Japanese: ダ・カーポ)	March 30, 2013
Kiyotaka wakes up in the morning then walks with Himeno and everyone else to school. They decided to write a different article for the graduation edition for the official newspaper club. Charles jumps on Kiyotaka again, Sara and Aoi try to spend time with him. Himeno contacts Kiyotaka in the courtyard but they get interrupted. Ricca has lunch with Kiyotaka as they talk more about past lives. The official and the unofficial club members found them on the roof of the school, Suginami uses his trick to help Kiyotaka and Ricca escape from them since their competition is meaningless now. Ricca tells Kiyotaka how they should move with their daily lives. The girls eventually found them and they all ask Kiyotaka to which girl he would choose, but he answers that he wants their relationship to stay the way they are for now. That evening, at the eternal cherry blossom tree they meet a girl, who reveals she is Sakura Yoshino, different from the other Sakura they all knew which feels nostalgic to them. She shows her magic of summoning Japanese sweets as she about to tell them a long dream-like story like a da capo. The episode ends showing Sakura in London holding a sakura twig meeting Ricca and Kiyotaka.

== Music ==
The Da Capo III visual novel has nine pieces of theme music: four opening themes, two ending themes, and three insert songs. The four opening themes are: "Da Capo III (Kimi ni Sasageru Ai no Mahō)" (ダ・カーポIII 〜キミにささげる あいのマホウ〜) by Yozuca, "Hajimari no Uta" (ハジマリノウタ) by No Life Negotiator, "Shiny Steps!!" by Suzuko Mimori, and "True Magic..." by Yurica/Hana-tan. The two ending themes are: "Harukaze ni Negai o" (春風に願いを) by Hiromi Satō, and "All is Love for you" by CooRie. The insert songs are: "Watashi ni wa Mienai" (私には見えない) Kyoro The World, "Hirari Namida" (ひらり涙) by CooRie, and "Kimi ga Ita Mirai Kimi to Inai Mirai" (君がいた未来 君といない未来) by Yozuca.

The opening theme for the anime is "Sakura Happy Innovation" (サクラハッピーイノベーション) by Emi Nitta, Ui Miyazaki, Mikoi Sasaki, Chiyo Ousaki, and Erika Kaiho. The main ending theme is "Meguru" (メグル) by CooRie. Other ending themes include "Aitai yo" (会いたいよ) by Yozuca for episodes 1 and 10, and "Reflection" by Emi Nitta for episode 6.

== Reception ==
Da Capo III ranked at No. 6 in terms of national PC game pre-orders in Japan in March 2012. In 2012, Da Capo III went on to rank three times in terms of national sales of PC games in Japan. The rankings were at No. 3 and No. 8 in April for the regular and limited editions, respectively, and No. 11 in May.
