= Ekachi Epilka =

Japanese animation studio

Ekachi Epilka Inc.
- Native name: 株式会社エカチエピルカ
- Romanized name: Kabushiki-gaisha Ekachi Epiruka
- Type: Kabushiki gaisha
- Industry: Animation studio
- Founded: March 2017; 9 years ago
- Defunct: July 31, 2025; 14 months ago
- Headquarters: Hokkaido, Japan
- Website: ekachi-epilka.jp

Ekachi Epilka Inc. (Japanese: 株式会社エカチエピルカ, Hepburn: Kabushiki-gaisha Ekachi Epiruka) was a Japanese animation studio based in Hokkaido that was founded in March 2017. The studio primarily worked as an outsourcing and subcontracting company for other studios and produced four series between 2018 and 2022. The studio began bankruptcy proceedings in July 2025.

== Works ==
=== Television series ===
Title	Director(s)	First run start date	First run end date	Eps	Note(s)	Ref(s)
Crossing Time	Yoshio Suzuki	April 10, 2018	June 26, 2018	12	Based on a manga written by Yoshimi Sato.	
Demon Lord, Retry!	Hiroshi Kimura	July 4, 2019	September 19, 2019	12	Based on a light novel written by Kurone Kanzaki.	
180-Byō de Kimi no Mimi o Shiawase ni Dekiru ka?	Yoshinobu Kasai	October 15, 2021	December 31, 2021	12	Original work. Co-animated with Indivision.	
Aru Asa Dummy Head Mike ni Natteita Ore-kun no Jinsei	Yoshinobu Kasai	October 13, 2022	December 29, 2022	12	Original work. Co-animated with Indivision.	
