= Demon Lord, Retry! =

Japanese light novel series and its franchise

- First light novel volume cover

魔王様、リトライ! (Maō-sama, Ritorai!)
- Genre: Fantasy, isekai
- Novel series
- Written by: Kurone Kanzaki
- Published by: Shōsetsuka ni Narō
- Original run: 2016 – present
- Light novel
- Written by: Kurone Kanzaki
- Illustrated by: Kōji Ogata (1st edition); Makoto Iino (2nd edition)
- Published by: Futabasha
- English publisher: NA: J-Novel Club
- Imprint: Monster Bunko, M Novels
- Original run: June 30, 2017 – present
- Volumes: 10
- Manga
- Written by: Kurone Kanzaki
- Illustrated by: Amaru Minotake
- Published by: Futabasha
- English publisher: NA: J-Novel Club
- Imprint: Monster Comics
- Magazine: Web Comic Action
- Original run: October 2017 – present
- Volumes: 5 + 12
- Anime television series
- Directed by: Hiroshi Kimura
- Written by: Ōka Tanisaki
- Music by: Satoshi Hōno
- Studio: Ekachi Epilka
- Licensed by: Crunchyroll
- Original network: Tokyo MX, BS Fuji
- Original run: July 4, 2019 – September 19, 2019
- Episodes: 12
- Anime television series

Demon Lord, Retry! R
- Directed by: Kazuomi Koga
- Written by: Katsuhiko Takayama
- Music by: Supa Love
- Studio: Gekkou
- Licensed by: Crunchyroll; SEA: Tropics Entertainment
- Original network: Tokyo MX, RKB, BS Fuji, BS NTV, KTN
- Original run: October 5, 2024 – December 21, 2024
- Episodes: 12
- icon

Demon Lord, Retry! (魔王様、リトライ!, Maō-sama, Ritorai!) is a Japanese fantasy light novel series written by Kurone Kanzaki and illustrated by Kōji Ogata (first edition) and Amaru Minotake (second edition). It began serialization online in 2016 on the user-generated novel publishing website Shōsetsuka ni Narō, as well as the website Hameln. It was later acquired by Futabasha, which has published the series since June 2017 under its Monster Bunko imprint. A manga adaptation with art by Amaru Minotake has been serialized via Futabasha's digital publication Web Comic Action since October 2017. J-Novel Club has licensed the light novel and manga series for English releases in July 2019, with the first English-translated volume being published in November 2019.

An anime television series adaptation by Ekachi Epilka aired from July to September 2019. An anime television series adaptation of the Demon Lord, Retry! R manga, produced by Gekkou, aired from October to December 2024.

== Plot ==
As Akira Ono prepares to shut down the servers of his creation, the MMORPG Infinity Game, he suddenly finds himself in the body of his character, Demon Lord Hakuto Kunai, after an unexplained event. The new world he wakes up in appears to be set within Infinity Game, but with some differences. He encounters and summons various companions who join him on his travels, and his reputation as "Demon Lord" spreads throughout the land, making him a target. Eventually, Ono/Kunai finds himself having to deal with the sociological problems of the Kingdom of Holy Light and the Satanist cult that opposes it, as he continues to pursue his mission of finding out why and how he was summoned.

== Characters ==
=== Main ===
Hakuto Kunai (九内 伯斗, Kunai Hakuto) / Akira Ōno (大野 晶, Ōno Akira)
Voiced by: Kenjiro Tsuda (Japanese); Jessie James Grelle (English)
Akira Ono is the creator of Infinity Game and has been its administrator for 15 years. He has an average, unassuming appearance who firmly believes God does not exist; outside of that, he seems perfectly ordinary. Through thousands of hours of gameplay he has become extremely experienced at his work, and as a functional employed adult has excellent acting skills, which he uses to maintain the appearance of his character, the self-proclaimed Demon Lord of the Great Empire Hakuto Kunai. He takes on Kunai's appearance of a tall man with sharp black eyes, long black hair, and the clothing of a mafia boss upon his summoning into the game's world. He smokes constantly, reinforcing the image of a mobster, and is quite sociable but becomes shy around women. He does not like being accused of actions he did not commit and prefers to avoid violence where possible, but will not hold back if he feels his actions are justified. Since Ono is sharing a body with Kunai's original personality, he can also be quite brutal towards his enemies, a side that the magic ring obtained early in his adventure attempts to appeal to. As Demon Lord, he boasts high levels of durability, physical strength, and numerous techniques, but no magic resistance, as he notes magic was not a proper mechanic in the original Infinity Game. He gains skill points for killing enemies, which he can spend to create items out of hammerspace, summon one of his eight NPCs to aid him, or unlock more administrator actions. His current goal is to find as much information as he can as to who, why, and how he was summoned, and if he can return home. Like Akira, Kunai is also an atheist, though this is because he thinks of himself as a god. His novel/manga design features slit pupils, and his chin shape and hair aren't as long.

Aku (アク, Aku)
Voiced by: Kanon Takao (1st anime), Momo Asakura (2nd anime) (Japanese); Natalie Hoover (English)
Aku is a 13-year-old girl with short blonde hair, an androgynous appearance, and heterochromic eyes, one red and one green. Her long fringe covers the left side of her face, over her green eye. She is the first friend Kunai makes once inside the game, unable to walk well because of an infected right leg. Aku was orphaned by disease at a young age, and this status, along with her unusual eyes, lead the other people in her village to bully and abuse her, forcing her to carry out the village's worst jobs such as waste disposal; she did not complain as she just wanted to be helpful. When the demon king Greol appeared and demanded human sacrifices from the nearby villages, Aku was cast out to be killed, but fled until she was saved by Kunai. Initially keeping her for information about the world around him, over time Kunai came to see Aku as a daughter figure. She is somewhat silly, constantly calling him Demon Lord in public; despite being told to call him by his last name. Aku's name means "evil" in Japanese, which Kunai notes the irony of. Her anime design gives her somewhat longer hair than the novel/manga, but is otherwise similar.

Luna Elegant (ルナ・エレガント, Runa Ereganto)
Voiced by: Kaori Ishihara (1st anime), Aina Suzuki (2nd anime) (Japanese); Kristen McGuire (English)
Luna is a 16-year-old girl with rose colored hair and eyes. The youngest of the Holy Maidens in the Kingdom of Holy Light, she respects her sisters while in their presence but is determined to one day surpass them both. Her natural talent and high levels of magical power have made her self-centered and narcissistic with an inflated opinion of her own abilities, though when faced with her first real fight, her lack of experience left her unable to make quick decisions and she was swiftly and embarrassingly defeated by Kunai, which included Kunai spanking her multiple times, a fact that he used on several occasions as a threat to keep her attitude in check. She has also neglected her own province, letting the Church manage it for her at a bare-minimum state, until Kunai decides to turn it into a resort to generate income from nobles. After developing a tsundere relationship with Kunai, she decided to continue traveling with him, often becoming jealous when he pays attention to other girls. She befriends Aku quickly and treats her like a little sister. Initially wearing a monastic habit fitting of her title, Kunai later has her wear a school uniform so as to avoid her standing out. In the novel/manga, her design was simpler, decorated with cross-shaped pins on her hair and frill dress, and the veil absent; this design was shared amongst the other Holy Maidens.

=== Supporting ===
Killer Queen (キラー・クイーン, Kiraa Kuiin)
Voiced by: Haruka Tomatsu (Japanese); Caitlin Glass (English)
Killer Queen is the 17-year-old middle sister of the Holy Maidens, though her aggressive, vulgar personality is more fitting of her name than the title. She is a wild beauty otherwise, with amber eyes, messy braided golden hair that reaches to her ankles, a voluptuous figure, and wearing a white and blue short dress with black leggings and gold boots. Rather than a Holy Maiden, Queen is a warrior who prefers the frontlines, riding in a war chariot. She has high skill and sense in close combat, using a variety of melee weapons. Her rough demeanor is changed for the first time upon seeing Kirisame Zero appear and effortlessly beating a large amount of Satanists and clearing away the Hades miasma that was weakening her. Due to Zero being the first man to ever treat her like a proper lady, she has since devoted her life to finding and being with Zero, to the point of obsession. In the novel/manga, all three Holy Maidens wore identical outfits and appearances; Queen received the most drastic revision for her anime design.

Angel White (エンジェル・ホワイト, Enjeru Howaito)
Voiced by: Aki Toyosaki (Japanese); Megan Shipman (English)
Angel White is the 18-year-old eldest sister of the Holy Maidens. She is the only one of the three who can be considered "normal", as she is calm, religious, straightforward, and always tries to analyze the situation. She has long vivid pink hair and fuchsia eyes, wears a white veil and gown dress that exposes her cleavage, elbow-length gloves, silver boots, and is described as beautiful beyond compare; even Kunai is taken aback by how attractive she is. White is very suspicious and cautious of Kunai's reputation as the Demon Lord, wondering if the rumor that demon king Greol being slain was true. She then suffers a brief nervous breakdown when she finds her younger sisters going through drastic changes in their behavior, with no obvious reason why. When the two do finally meet, White becomes anxious as to why Kunai is intent on researching Seraph, one of the angels said to have created the kingdom. She is also in disbelief how Luna, the embodiment of selfishness, was tamed by Kunai so fast, attributing it to brainwashing. Their conversation ends on seemingly amicable terms, with White agreeing to wait and see for his accomplishments before judging him, but still remains uneasy of what Kunai's end goal could be. When Kunai later gifts her an angel halo, during a trip to Rabi Village and an embarrassing moment in one of the outdoor baths between the two, she confuses Kunai with "Lucifer" thanks to a series of misunderstandings, and swears she will guide him to the right path. During this time she develops romantic feelings for him, but she herself does not seem to be aware of this. In the novel/manga, all three Holy Maidens wore identical outfits and appearances.

Yū Kirino (桐野 悠, Kirino Yū)
Voiced by: Rina Satō (Japanese); Katelyn Barr (English)
The first of Akira Ono's NPC's to be summoned by Kunai; a 22-year-old appealing woman with long black hair, black eyes, and a laboratory coat who served as a boss of "Nightless City" in the original Infinity Game. She is described as a brilliant mad scientist, but also a sadist with an attraction to young boys. Her innate power "Hand of God" allows her to morph her fingers into surgical instruments and exterminate any illness and cure any wound, which can only be described as cheating. Kunai chose Yu with the intent of having her invent a solution to his lack of magic resistance, as well as to have someone to confide his situation to, but forbade her to kill so as to focus on gathering information. She initially proposes using the Nightless City, but it was turned down because their world had a cyberpunk setting, and the act of bringing in an urban fortress into a fantasy world would be too much. After healing Aku's leg, Kunai complimenting Yu caused her to experience happiness for the first time, which she describes as "an all-knowing creator acknowledging my presence for the first time". From then on, she develops a crush on Kunai and experiences a wave of euphoria whenever Kunai states that he is counting on her. Across different mediums, her design and outfit has undergone several minor changes, but the one constant is her lab coat.

Isami Tahara (田原 勇, Tahara Isami)
Voiced by: Tomokazu Seki (1st anime), Wataru Komada (2nd anime) (Japanese); Eric Rolon (English)
The second NPC summoned by Kunai; a 31-year-old male special forces soldier with short brown hair and an innate speciality for firearms; he owns 47 firearms from flintlocks to sniper rifles that all apparently have their own will, can float in the air, and can by commanded by Isami to shoot specific targets or follow and protect a target such as Aku. He apparently has infinite bullets. He has a teasing, provocative attitude and is considered a lazy genius, with a fast learning capability no matter what he is made to do, and producing a result higher than that of his peers. He is noted to get along amicably with Yu, but is secretly afraid of her, nor does he like to think of the horrors she has committed back in Infinity Game. Perhaps Isami's most iconic trait is the absolute adoration he has for his little sister Manami who is much younger than him, his in-game bio stating he became Kunai's aide to earn money to raise her and himself out of homelessness.

Zero Kirisame (霧雨 零, Kirisame Zero)
Voiced by: Showtaro Morikubo (1st anime), Kentarō Kumagai (2nd anime) (Japanese); Jessie James Grelle (English)
An alternate character of Akira Ono initially meant to be a joke character but played for at least 10 years, he is first seen when Kunai is forced to swap avatars in order to save Luna and Killer Queen after his magic ring paralyzes him, at the cost of being unable to control Zero. With his silver hair and eyes, gold chains, and enormous white coat covered with strange phrases and artwork of a silver dragon drawn on the back, Zero's presence draws in all types of attention. He is extremely proud and arrogant, bragging about being the best. Zero showcases immense physical prowess and barefisted close combat techniques, including the ability to create a dragon-shaped shockwave and multiplying his damage output based on how many lives his enemy had killed. The gallant delinquent is likened to a berserker during battle, feeling great joy in a good fight. His sense of justice means he cannot ignore weak people being abused by the strong, especially women and children. Ironically, he was programmed to be wrathful over the actions of Hakuto Kunai and his Grand Empire and is a declared enemy, not knowing they are now one and the same. After his first stunt saving Killer Queen and Luna from the Satanists and their miasma, he became the object of Queen's undying affection, and word of his actions spread. He became a target of concern for the Satanists and others due to being a half-dragon hybrid. Kunai would swap to Zero to save Queen from Satanists again, this time battling demon prince Oruit. He revives Tron from fatal damage inflicted by his opponent before finishing a transformed Oruit off, earning him a new admirer. Later, Tron would find Kunai and recognize from his soul makeup and manner of speech that he and Zero are the same person. Much like Kunai, Zero is quite talkative but becomes shy about contact with girls. Ono/Kunai can only watch and experience the bitter taste of his over-the-top creation gain awareness, and is deeply embarrassed that he ever created such a showy delinquent character, but those traits are amusingly the reason Queen is attracted to Zero, and he himself acts similar to Zero many times without realizing it. He is depicted with a motorcycle in the original Infinity Game. In the manga/novel, he sports a different hairstyle, a scar on his cheek, and his coat design changed somewhat as well, most noticeably the collar.

Tron (トロン, Toron)
Voiced by: Suzuna Kinoshita (Japanese); Sarah Wiedenheft (English)
A half-demon girl with red eyes and blonde hair in a long ponytail in the image of a blue and black gothic lolita, appearing around the same age as Aku. Much like Aku, she was orphaned at a young age and persecuted by the world around her, by demonkind for having unclean blood, and by humans for being a half-breed. Her melancholic behavior was reinforced by the Satanist leader Utopia capturing her and seeing her as nothing more than a tool, as he also hates her for being impure. She was tasked with delivering a second release of Hades miasma to aid the Satanists summoning Oruit. When Zero Kirisame appears and easily defeats Oruit, he mortally wounds Tron through her gut and drains her blood to transform into a bestial entity. As Tron bleeds out and quietly accepts the end of her miserable life, she is fully revived when Zero feeds her a magic energy bar and is told to just smile, no matter the hardship. She has held a crush and admiration for Zero since then. Tron can fly freely, and can see the souls and emotions of people via colors. It is through this ability that she manages to track down Kunai and find that he and Zero are the same being. Out of love for Zero, Tron insists on joining Kunai, who after thinking it would be wrong to leave someone Zero saved back on the streets again, eventually relents. Kunai promises to her that if she behaves and serves him well, he won't mind bringing out Zero to see her. She is so far the only character to know that Zero and the Demon Lord are the same. Her manga design has untied straight hair.

Mikan (ミカン, Mikan)
Voiced by: Hitomi Nabatame (Japanese); Beth Lipton (English)
A 17-year-old B-rank adventurer with tan skin and short orange hair and eyes, fitting of her name. She travels alongside Yukikaze, and is serious and straightforward in nature compared to her friend. She is described as being rebellious but kind, and has a preference towards frontline battling, fighting with a large two-handed sword. Despite the two adventurers being saved by him twice, Mikan remains distrustful of Kunai because of his ominous title, and objects to Yukikaze opening up to him, but when Kunai plans to travel to the northern territories, it is Mikan who tells him about guilds and how weapons and armor looted from dungeons are categorized. Kunai then recruits the two to help him traverse the northern territories. She wears torn, broken armor that exposes a lot of her breasts, arms, and body, covered by a green cloak, and goggles on her head; this is changed from a modest red outfit in the novel/manga, where she also has red eyes and hair.

Yukikaze (ユキカゼ, Yukikaze)
Voiced by: Sora Tokui (Japanese); Apphia Yu (English)
A 16-year-old B-rank adventurer with pale skin, silver hair with a red ribbon, and silver eyes, described repeatedly as a "girlish boy". He travels alongside Mikan, and is sexually perverted and joking in nature compared to his friend. He constantly spouts obscene innuendo, even in the midst of danger. As a mage, he fights using ice and wind magic, fitting of his name. Because Kunai saved the two adventurers twice, Yukikaze is enamored with him while Mikan remains distrustful. Yukikaze helps to explain items and life as an adventurer, and informs Kunai that traversing the north is tough because of a war campaign that is happening. He volunteers himself to travel with Kunai when he states his plan to go to the northern territories, so Kunai recruits the two to help him. Yukikaze wears an ornate black bandeau and skirt, loose black boots and stockings with suspenders, purple cloak with pink underside, and an oversized witch hat, decorated with red and orange scarves. The novel/manga gives him a far more simpler appearance of a loose black and white shirt with large sleeves, pink shorts, and a smaller hat decorated with a large button of a snowman face.

Mink (ミンク, Minku)
Voiced by: Chiyo Ousaki (1st anime), Minori Suzuki (2nd anime) (Japanese); Amanda Lee (English)
A 20-year-old S-rank adventurer with red eyes, neck-length indigo hair that obscures her right eye, and wearing a blue dress with multiple belts and braces, topped with a flat, wide-brimmed hat. A bandage wrapped around her forehead covers her right eye, though there is no injury. Mink has a tall buxom stature, her countenance and big breasts naturally draw in the eyes of men. She suffers from Chunibyo syndrome (delusions of grandeur), leading to her spouting outlandish phrases. She has a favorite pose while she does so, raising her right hand over her covered eye in dramatic fashion. Mink is very energetic and always ready for a fight. Despite being a priestess who uses the power of light to purify and heal, she enjoys chanting strange, macabre words that are not expected of a priest. She is considered a "Star Player", the equivalent of a celebrity. Despite Organ being her companion, Mink does most of the fighting while Organ stays a distance away. She is shown to be powerful enough to hold her own against large groups of Satanists and even Oruit, until the Hades miasma was dumped onto her by Tron. Her outfit more resembles a nun habit in the novel/manga.

Organ (オルガン, Orugan)
Voiced by: M.A.O (1st anime), Mirai Tachibana (2nd anime) (Japanese); Emi Lo (English)
An S-rank adventurer of an unknown age with blue eyes, deep magenta hair that reaches down to her bare feet, and wearing nothing but a brown bandeau and bikini, with bangles on her wrists, neck, and stomach, covered by a tattered black robe with red interior that hides her appearance. Part of her skin from the legs up to the left side of her body is discolored, and teal scales are found growing on her left cheek and right leg; this could be a result of her half-demon heritage. Organ is reclusive and apathetic, keeping in touch only with Mink, she does not care much about anyone else. Because she was weak and became strong to protect herself, she does not like to see the strong saving the weak, and wonders why Mink bothers to do so. Only Mink knows that she is a half-demon. Organ dislikes Zero, and after witnessing him saving Tron, another half-devil, her frustration increased. Even though Zero is of mixed race just like her, a half-dragon is valued, while a half-demon is hated. In Organ's eyes, this logic is unreasonable, and it frustrates her; this is why she goes to great lengths to hide herself, constantly changing where she is, to avoid being a target of subjugation.

Iei (イエイ, Iei)
The 45-year-old pub landlord of the Noma Noma tavern. She is well-built and has a loud, amicable, boisterous nature, and many young adventurers such as Yukikaze and Mikan see her as a motherly figure. She looks after her patrons and knows many of them at a personal level, and is noted to manage the tavern and her regulars with great efficiency. She and all the adventurers at Noma Noma treat Kunai to food and drink for defeating Carnival when Yukikaze and Mikan take him there. Iei and the tavern she owns are named after Romanian lyrics from the chorus of Dragostea Din Tei.

Mount Fuji (マウント・フジ, Maunto Fuji)
Voiced by: Tyson Rinehart
Killer Queen's second-in-command and most devout follower; he visually references Street Fighter's Zangief. He is usually carrying Queen's arsenal on his back, such as her sword or her Holy Sigma hammer. When he notices Queen acting meek towards Zero, he does a spit-take, to which Queen angrily whispers he would be executed if he ever acknowledges what he just saw.

Marshall Arts (マーシャル・アーツ, Maasharu Aatsu)
Voiced by: Chris Rager
The leader of the kingdom's military forces. Marshall Arts is, despite being in his 60s, a seasoned veteran who puts more confidence in his own subordinate's reports than the words of a nobleman. He holds great respect for the previous leader Commando Sambo, and holds a celebration in his honor when Sambo's blindness is cured by Yu. He does not hide his hostility towards Dona Dona.

Dona Dona (ドナ・ドナ, Dona Dona)
Voiced by: Anthony Bowling
A high-ranking bureaucrat of great influence of the kingdom, although he is of such elevated class, his vulgar expressions (such as subtly masturbating in Angel White's presence) leave a bad impression of himself. Regardless, he is still considered important for his ability to lead, deal with, and bring many other nobles together. He owns many mining operations, and controls a large portion of the kingdom's economy. He does not hide his hostility towards others including Marshall Arts and his own assassin butler Azur, and becomes upset upon finding out Ebifry Butterfly had moved to Rabi village. Dona Dona is named after a song about a calf being led to slaughter.

Ebifry Butterfly (エビフライ・バタフライ, Ebifurai Batafurai)
Voiced by: Kimiko Saitō (Japanese); Jamie Marchi (English)
A central figure amongst the nobility of the kingdom, Ebifry bears the most influence of all female nobles. Luna refers to her as "Madam". Her large, obese body is adorned with such decor and dress making it clear to the eye that she is wealthy. Such is the influence she radiates that it scares other nobles, and her skill in politics and socialization allows her to control the wives of nobility with iron hands. Ebifly is envious, since when she was little she was always bullied for being fat. She is also proud and social, despite her past she has grown to be a strong, threatening woman. It is through this upbringing that allowed her to be unfazed by Kunai's title of Demon Lord when they first meet. After learning from Luna that Ebifry is one of the greatest social powers in the kingdom, Kunai proposes prospects involving renovating Luna's province to gain her trust, taking advantage of her concern regarding her appearance. She becomes curious of the message Kunai is trying to send, and after witnessing Commando Sambo's blindness being cured and experiencing the various types of baths in the hot springs resort, she makes the decision to move out of the kingdom and have permanent residence in Rabi Village, a move that shocks all of the high class. She has a bitter relationship with her sister, Kakifry.

Momo (モモ, Momo) and Kyon (キョン, Kyon)
Momo Voiced by: Yurika Kubo (Japanese); Kylie Stewart (English)
Kyon Voiced by: Kazusa Aranami (Japanese); Kimberly Grace (English)
Two Bunny residents of Rabi Village in Luna's neglected province. Momo has tan skin, short black hair and brown eyes, with "-usa" as a verbal tic (part of "usagi" meaning "rabbit"), while Kyon has light blue hair and maroon eyes, and has "-pyon" as a verbal tic (Japanese onomatopoeia for hopping); they do this because the Bunnies are conditioned to talk that way to the humans who looked down on them. The two friends, along with the other residents of the village, are overwhelmingly grateful to Kunai for improving their town, and promise to keep the source of his contributions secret. Momo and Kyon are later employed by Kunai to help greet visitors and manage the hot springs resort.

Oruit (オルイット, Oruitto)
Voiced by: Hikaru Midorikawa (Japanese); Chris Gardner (English)
A demon "prince of darkness" with silver hair, pale skin, blue slit pupils with black sclera, and wearing a black and blue suit and cloak over his black wings. He is condescending, collects works of art, and is very spiteful towards angels and dragons. He was summoned by a large group of surviving Satanists as a last resort after the demon Carnival's defeat and made short work of Killer Queen, Mount Fuji, and Mink. When Zero came in however, he was swiftly outclassed despite his rank. Becoming stressed at the thought of losing so easily, he spots Tron and mortally wounds her through her gut, draining her blood, which he calls "stinky and disgusting" due to being half-breed. He transforms into an exaggerated bat-hellhound entity, but is still vanquished by Zero. It is later revealed that what Zero killed was just a vessel in Oruit's image, though he still felt the pain and humiliation of the fight. In his mansion, Oruit has a female servant who is suffering from the same petrification as the idol Kunai met, and is pestered by another demon resembling a young boy called Cale.

Utopia (ユートピア, Yuutopia)
Voiced by: Takehito Koyasu (Japanese); Ben Phillips (English)
The leader of the Satanist cults, dressed in a cassock with a hood covering his eyes. His goal is to destroy the Kingdom of Holy Light and its Holy Maidens, the reason he claims is to overthrow the government led by the luxurious and rich of the kingdom and create a new country that respects everyone and gives basic needs, though this is all a lie taking advantage of the poor's resentment. Has a strong hatred for dragons, because they claimed to be neutral in the past when the Demon Regime fought against the Beast Kingdom, but always intervened against the demons. He is upset of Zero being a half-dragon who appeared suddenly, but is more concerned of Hakuto Kunai being a Demon Lord his cultists did not intend to summon, and may oppose him.

Otamega (ヲタメガ, Otamega)
A hero of the northern territories referred to as a "Holy Brave". He is a somewhat overweight young man wearing modern day clothes, unkempt brown hair, and his spectacles emit a blinding shine that covers his eyes. On his back is a big white boxy rucksack with two handles coming out from it, one a sword of light and the other a morningstar. He is the image of someone right out of an anime convention. It is not made clear how he came to the game's world, but he has an altruistic nature, wishing to have power to change the lives of poor people for the better, but that made him hated by the elites of the region. Nevertheless, Otamega isn’t the type of person who would change his ideals to protect himself, his peers from home already gave low opinions of him anyway. He apparently goes around the northern countries every year distributing food to the poor. Despite his unfit body, he can move fast like the wind and bears the power of an army. Otamega is followed by a passionate, loyal group of heroes called the White Tri Stars; this along with his rucksack design and the "White Comet" epithet he gives himself are all homages to Mobile Suit Gundam. "Otamega" can also be read as a shortening of "Otaku-megane" or "glasses-geek". While a somewhat major character in the novels, he makes a cameo appearance in the anime as part of the final episode's teaser, with Kunai confused and repulsed by the sight of him.

Akane Fujisaki (藤崎 茜, Fujisaki Akane)
Voiced by: Azumi Waki
Another NPC created by Akira Ono; a 16-year-old athletic schoolgirl with black eyes and short dark hair, wearing a qipao that changes to a sailor fuku when she enters the game. Her personality is stated to be headstrong and cheerful, as well as a feverish otaku. She wields a pair of tonfa and is noted to be the fastest of Kunai's aides. Unlike Yuu and Isami, it is unknown how Akane came to be in the series's setting as Akira did not willingly summon her. She encounters Mink and Organ at some point in her wandering journey, and also befriends Otamega through their shared passion of popular culture. So far, she only has a proper appearance in the novels.

== Media ==
=== Light novels ===
Futabasha started publishing since June 2017 under their Monster Bunko imprint, illustrated by Kōji Ogata. Three volumes have been published between June 2017 and June 2018. A second, revised, edition of the light novels, illustrated by Makoto Iino, began publishing under Futabasha's M Novels label from October 2018. This series is also available in English with J-Novel Club acquiring the rights for English releases in July 2019, with the first English-translated volume being published in November 2019.

==== 1st edition ====
No.	Release date	ISBN
1	June 30, 2017	978-4-575-75141-3
2	October 30, 2017	978-4-575-75166-6
3	June 30, 2018	978-4-575-75194-9

==== 2nd edition ====
No.	Original release date	Original ISBN	English release date	English ISBN
1	October 22, 2018	978-4-575-24115-0	November 4, 2019 (Digital)	978-1-7183-6298-7
2	February 15, 2019	978-4-575-24147-1	January 11, 2020 (Digital)	978-1-7183-6300-7
3	May 30, 2019	978-4-575-24178-5	April 11, 2020 (Digital)	978-1-7183-6302-1
4	August 30, 2019	978-4-575-24202-7	August 29, 2020 (Digital)	978-1-7183-6304-5
5	February 29, 2020	978-4-575-24147-1	November 23, 2020 (Digital)	978-1-718-36306-9
6	August 31, 2020	978-4-575-24314-7	March 28, 2021 (Digital)	978-1-718-36308-3
7	February 27, 2021	978-4-575-24381-9	November 16, 2021 (Digital)	978-1-718-36310-6
8	November 29, 2021	978-4-575-24472-4	September 12, 2022 (Digital)	978-1-718-36312-0
9	September 29, 2023	978-4-575-24677-3	January 14, 2025 (Digital)	978-1-718-36314-4
10	September 30, 2024	978-4-575-24772-5	September 29, 2025 (Digital)	978-1-718-36316-8

=== Manga ===
A manga adaptation with art by Amaru Minotake has been serialized via Futabasha's digital publication Web Comic Action since October 2017. It was collected in five tankōbon volumes in December 2019. J-Novel Club has licensed the manga. Amaru Minotake continued the "re-vamped" manga under the title Demon Lord, Retry! R in 2020, with the first volume published in July. As of November 2026, another twelve volumes have been published. J-Novel Club is continuing to license the manga for English translation.

No.	Original release date	Original ISBN	English release date	English ISBN
1	March 30, 2018	978-4-575-41023-5	March 4, 2020 (Digital)	978-1-7183-4870-7
2	August 30, 2018	978-4-575-41032-7	June 10, 2020 (Digital)	978-1-718-34871-4
3	January 30, 2019	978-4-575-41046-4	September 9, 2020 (Digital)	978-1-718-34872-1
4	June 28, 2019	978-4-575-41063-1	December 9, 2020 (Digital)	978-1-718-34873-8
5	December 28, 2019	978-4-575-41095-2	March 3, 2021 (Digital)	978-1-718-34874-5
R-1	July 30, 2020	978-4-575-41132-4	Nov 3, 2021 (Digital)	978-1-718-34875-2
R-2	December 28, 2020	978-4-575-41189-8	January 12, 2022 (Digital)	978-1-718-34876-9
R-3	July 30, 2021	978-4-575-41258-1	September 7, 2022 (Digital)	978-1-718-34877-6
R-4	January 14, 2022	978-4-575-41346-5	November 30, 2022 (Digital)	978-1-718-34878-3
R-5	July 15, 2022	978-4-575-41458-5	September 14, 2023 (Digital)	978-1-718-34879-0
R-6	January 13, 2023	978-4-575-41571-1	April 25, 2024 (Digital)	978-1-718-34880-6
R-7	August 30, 2023	978-4-575-41717-3	June 25, 2025 (Digital)	978-1-718-34881-3
R-8	February 29, 2024	978-4-575-41836-1	September 17, 2025 (Digital)	978-1-718-34882-0
R-9	September 30, 2024	978-4-575-41981-8	December 24, 2025 (Digital)	978-1-718-34883-7
R-10	March 28, 2025	978-4-575-42115-6	April 1, 2026 (Digital)	978-1-718-34884-4
R-11	November 14, 2025	978-4-575-42248-1	—	—
R-12	November 13, 2026	978-4-575-42547-5	—	—

=== Anime ===
An anime television series adaptation aired from July 4 to September 19, 2019, on Tokyo MX and BS Fuji. (Note: Tokyo MX listed the series premiere on July 3, 2019 at 24:00, which is July 4 at midnight JST.) It is produced by Ekachi Epilka and directed by Hiroshi Kimura, with series composition by Ōka Tanisaki, and character designs by Chiyo Nakayama. The opening theme song is "Tempest", performed by Kaori Ishihara, while the ending theme song is "New", performed by Haruka Tōjō. Funimation streamed the series, which following Sony's acquisition of Crunchyroll, the series was moved to its namesake platform.

An anime adaptation of the Demon Lord, Retry! R manga was announced on August 21, 2023. It was later revealed to be a television series produced by Gekkou and directed by Kazuomi Koga, with series composition by Katsuhiko Takayama, character designs by Minori Homura, and music by Supa Love. The season aired from October 5 to December 21, 2024, on Tokyo MX and other networks. The opening theme song is "Ashita Sekai ga Owaru Toshite mo" (明日世界が終わるとしても; Even if the World Ends Tomorrow). performed by Asca, while the ending theme song is "Clanssi:c" (クランシック), performed by MIMiNARI feat. Yuho Kitazawa. Crunchyroll streamed the series. Tropics Entertainment licensed the series and streamed it in their Tropics Anime Asia YouTube channel.
