= Clear =

Clear may refer to:

- Transparency, or clarity, the physical property of allowing light to pass through

== Arts and entertainment ==
=== Music ===
==== Groups ====
- Clear (Christian band), an American CCM group from Cambridge, Minnesota
- Clear (hardcore band), a vegan straight edge hardcore group from Utah

==== Albums ====
- Clear (Bomb the Bass album), 1995
- Clear (Cybotron album), originally and later titled Enter, or the title song (see below), 1983
- Clear (Spirit album) or the title song, 1969
- Clear (EP), by Periphery, 2014
- Clear, by James Ferraro, 2008
- Clear, an EP by Summer Walker, 2019

==== Songs ====
- "Clear" (Cybotron song), 1983
- "Clear" (Maaya Sakamoto song), 2018
- "Clear!", by Kardinal Offishall, 2009
- "Clear", by Miley Cyrus from Hannah Montana 2: Meet Miley Cyrus, 2007
- "Clear", by Needtobreathe from Hard Love, 2016
- "Clear", by P-Model from P-Model, 1992
- "Clear", by Twenty One Pilots from Regional at Best, 2011

=== Other media ===
- Clear (magazine), an American fashion and lifestyle magazine
- Clear (visual novel), a 2007 adult Japanese visual novel and related media
- "Clear" (The Walking Dead), a television episode
- Clear, a 2001 ballet by Stanton Welch

== Businesses and organizations ==
- Clear (company), a UK-based carbon-offsetting company
- Clear (shampoo), a brand of anti-dandruff shampoo from Unilever
- Clear Secure, a New York City-headquartered, biometrics-based, identity-verification technology company
- Clear (Scientology), a belief in Scientology
- Campaign for Lead Free Air, a UK anti-pollution group
- Cannabis Law Reform, a UK pro-cannabis legalisation group

== People ==
- Bob Clear (1927–2010), American baseball coach
- Cameron Clear (born 1993), American football player
- Eddie Clear (born 1944), American soccer player
- Edwin A. Clear (1896–1960), English World War I flying ace
- Marc Clear, British opera singer, musical performer, and director
- Mark Clear (born 1956), American baseball pitcher
- Todd Clear (born 1949), American criminologist

== Technology ==
- CLEAR (DOS command), an internal command in Seattle Computer's 86-DOS
- clear (Unix), a UNIX command
- Clear, any transmission or data which is not encoded
- CERN Linear Electron Accelerator for Research, a research and development facility

== Other uses ==
- Clear, Alaska, US
  - Clear Airport, a state-owned public-use airport
  - Clear Space Force Station, a radar station
- The Clear or tetrahydrogestrinone, an anabolic steroid

== See also ==
- Claro (surname)
- Clear channel (disambiguation)
- Clearance (disambiguation)
- Cleare, a surname
- Clearing (disambiguation)
- Cleere, a surname
- Clere, a surname
- CLR (disambiguation)
- {{Clear}}, a Wikipedia template
