= Maji Suki: Marginal Skip =

2009 video game

- Maji Suki original visual novel cover

マジスキ ～MarginalSkip～ (Maji Suki ~Mājinaru Sukippu~)
- Genre: Harem, Fantasy, Romance
- Video game
- Developer: Moonstone
- Publisher: Moonstone
- Genre: Eroge, Visual novel
- Platform: Windows, iOS, Android
- Released: JP: April 24, 2009 (Windows)
- Manga

Maji Suki
- Written by: Moonstone
- Illustrated by: Aya Oryu
- Published by: Futabasha
- Magazine: Comic High!
- Original run: March 2009 – May 2010
- Volumes: 2

Maji Suki: Marginal Skip (マジスキ ～MarginalSkip～, Maji Suki ~Mājinaru Sukippu~) is a Japanese adult visual novel developed and published by Moonstone. Moonstone has also released such visual novels as Gift, and Clear. Maji Suki was first released as a DVD for Windows PCs on April 24, 2009. The story revolves around Takayuki Kujou, who made a promise to a girl in the past, and now they are reunited.

Gameplay in Maji Suki offers branching plot lines and a multiple choice navigation, where multiple paths and endings are available for completion. The player, who assumes the role of Takayuki Kujou, can end up with any of the five heroines presented in the game. Maji Suki has made transitions into other media, such as a manga that serialized in Comic High!, and an internet radio show.

== Gameplay ==
Gameplay in Maji Suki, showing the other characters' thoughts in thought bubbles.

Maji Suki is a romance visual novel in which the player assumes the role of Takayuki Kujou. Its gameplay mainly consists of reading and progressing through the story's narrative and dialogue. The game's text is accompanied by character sprites, which represent who Takayuki is talking to, appearing on top of background artwork. Throughout the game, the player encounters CG artwork at certain points in the story, which take the place of the regular background art and character sprites. Maji Suki follows a branching plot line with nonlinear sequences and multiple endings, where the plot's direction is affected by the player's decisions.

The gameplay requires little interaction from the player as most of the duration of the game is spent on simply reading the text that will appear on the screen; this text represents either dialogue between the various characters, or the inner thoughts of the protagonist. Every so often, the player will come to a "decision point" where they are given the chance to choose from options that are displayed on the screen, typically two to three at a time. During these times, gameplay pauses until a choice is made that furthers the plot in a specific direction, depending on which choice the player makes. There are five main plot lines that the player will have the chance to experience, one for each of the five heroines in the story. In order to view the five plot lines to their entirety, the player will have to replay the game multiple times and choose different choices during the decision points in order to further the plot in an alternate direction. Throughout gameplay, there are scenes depicting Takayuki and a given heroine having sexual intercourse.

== Plot ==
On a night with the full moon glowing, Takayuki made a promise to a girl in the past; before she left, he told her that he would save her whenever she got in trouble. After that, the girl disappeared. In the present time, Takayuki is attending a private academy, and reunites with the girl, who is actually a princess from a magic world.

=== Principal characters ===
The main protagonist of the game is Takayuki Kujou (九条 貴之, Kujō Takayuki), who is the vice president of the student council. He is a very kind and considerate person. When Takayuki was young, he met a girl called Sheila El Elise (シェーラ＝エル・エリス, Shēra Eru Erisu; voiced by Fūri Samoto) who is the main heroine of the game, she is the princess of the magic world. Sheila is a skilled magic user, and has a sweet, polite personality, however, she is scary once angered. She loves mitarashi dango. Sheila's younger sister is Neithright "Neith" Heithlover (ニースライト・ヒースラヴァー, Nīsuraito Hīsuravā; voiced by Yukari Aoyama), she is one year younger than her older sister. Neithright is an introverted girl who used to be a princess also, however, due to some issues, her parents divorced and she became a normal girl. She is quite quick to become jealous when it comes to Takayuki.

Takayuki has three childhood friends, Yukina Miyazaki (宮崎 由紀菜, Miyazaki Yukina; voiced by Oto Agumi), Touko Amatsu (天津 冬子, Amatsu Tōko; voiced by Tomoe Tamiyasu), and Kanade Misagiri (御狭霧 かなで, Misagiri Kanade; voiced by Kazane). Yukina is a girl who has known Takayuki since he was young, she lives in an orphanage. Touko is a popular girl who is a year older than Takayuki, she is the leader singer of the group Date Course, under the stage name of Risa Amatsu. Takayuki lives with Kanade because both of his parents have died; Kanade is one year younger than him, and is like a little sister to him.

== Development and release ==
Maji Suki is the seventh product of Moonstone (not including the Gift and Clear fan discs/sequels). Kure was the scenario writer and planner, whilst the main visuals were drawn by Mitha. Other artists that contributed to the game include Hinata Mutsuki, Miiko Inagaki, and Itou Life. Computer graphics (CG) for the game were handled by: Mitsuki Saiga, Yamakaze, Hinata Nao, Endori, and rastel. On a related note, Sasanqua worked on the background graphics (BG). Kaoru was the system supervisor for Maji Suki, and background music (BGM) was arranged by a music production group called Angel Note. The supervisor of the game was tororo, and the producer was Hotaru Koizumi.

A trial version of the game became available through download on the official Maji Suki website on March 6, 2009. The limited edition of Maji Suki was released by Moonstone for Windows PCs on April 24, 2004, as a DVD-ROM. On May 29, 2009, a regular edition was released as one DVD. An iOS and Android version of Maji Suki was made available on April 4, 2013.

== Related media ==
=== Printed media ===
A manga adaptation of the visual novel simply titled Maji Suki and drawn by Aya Oryu was serialized in the seinen Comic High! magazine between March 2009 and May 2010. Futabasha published two tankōbon volumes on September 12, 2009, and May 12, 2010. Two art books for Maji Suki have been published. The first of these was the Maji Suki Prelude Book which was published on March 27, 2009, by Media Village, consisting of forty eight pages in full color. Another book, titled Maji Suki ~Marginal Skip~ Official Fan Book, was published on November 25, 2009, by Twin Tails. It contains story and character explanations, staff interviews, CG commentary, and more.

=== Music and audio CDs ===
The visual novel's opening theme is "Promise ~Moonlit Night of Memory~" (Promise 〜月夜の記憶〜, Promise ~Tsukiyo no Kioku~) by Hiromi Satō and NANA. "Kiss Me Tonight" is the ending song to Maji Suki, sung by Aina Kase, and Date Course sung the insert song "I Want to Hold You" (抱きしめて欲しいよ, Dakishimete Hoshii Yo). A single for Promise ~Moonlit Night of Memory~ was released by PetaBits Records on April 24, 2009. An original soundtrack for Maji Suki came bundled with the limited edition, containing songs and various BGM. Lastly, PetaBits released a Maji Suki vocal album on May 29, 2009.

=== Internet radio show ===
An internet radio show to promote the sales of the visual novel called Maji Suki Communication was broadcast every Friday on Nico Nico Douga, sixteen episodes were made between January 23 and May 8, 2009. The show was hosted by J-pop group Date Course, which consists of three members: Risa Amatsu, Miho Touma, and Narumi Kureha. They are voiced by Tomoe Tamiyasu, Milk, and Aina Kase, respectively. A DVD called Date Course FANDISC Maji Suki Ver. was released on September 18, 2009, containing the sixteen episodes of Maji Suki Communication, two episodes of Maji Suki Communication Public Recording, and another two episodes of Maji Suki Communication Meeting for Reviewing. Additionally, two Maji Suki songs and a Date Course wallpaper data collection was included in the DVD.

Date Course is also an in-universe group in Maji Suki. It is explained in the game that Touko Amatsu assumes the identity of Risa Amatsu who is the lead singer of Date Course. She is a childhood friend to Takayuki, and one of the five dateable heroines in Maji Suki. The group made their debut in their roles of promoting and appearing as characters in Maji Suki. Date Course went on to create music which was later included in visual novels such as Princess Party.

== Reception ==
On Getchu.com, a major re-distributor of visual novel and domestic anime products, Maji Suki ranked as the second most widely sold game of April 2009. The game charted further during the next month, and ranked No. 26 out of thirty titles. Overall, Maji Suki was the forty second most widely sold visual novel of 2009 on Getchu.com. In the 2009 Moe Game Awards, Maji Suki won the topic award for its in-universe singer group Date Course, which also hosted the Maji Suki Communication radio show.
