= Imouto Paradise 2 =

2013 Japanese visual novel

- Imouto Paradise! 2: Onii-chan to Go nin no Imouto no Motto! Ecchi Shimakuri na Mainichi
- Original visual novel cover for Windows.

妹ぱらだいす！2 ～お兄ちゃんと5人の妹のも～っと！エッチしまくりな毎日～
- Genre: Harem, Incest, Erotica
- Video game
- Developer: Moonstone Cherry
- Publisher: Moonstone Cherry (PC); Dennou Club (DVDPG)
- Genre: Eroge, Visual novel
- Platform: Windows, DVD TV game, Smartphone
- Released: JP: May 31, 2013 (PC)
- Original video animation
- Directed by: Yanaha Sadayama
- Written by: That man ○ east
- Released: August 3, 2013 – October 4, 2013
- Runtime: 15 minutes each
- Episodes: 2
- Manga
- Written by: Moonstone Cherry
- Illustrated by: Mikage Sikizai
- Published by: Enterbrain; Kadokawa Shoten
- Imprint: Tech Gian Style
- Magazine: Tech Gian
- Original run: August 2013 – February 2014
- Volumes: 1
- Light novel
- Written by: Hiro Masayuki
- Illustrated by: Itou Life
- Published by: Paradigm
- Imprint: Puchipara Bunko
- Published: October 11, 2013
- Prequel
- Imouto Paradise!

Imouto Paradise! 2: Onii-chan to Go nin no Imouto no Motto! Ecchi Shimakuri na Mainichi (妹ぱらだいす！2 ～お兄ちゃんと5人の妹のも～っと！エッチしまくりな毎日～) is a Japanese erotic visual novel developed by Moonstone Cherry and released on May 31, 2013, for Windows PCs and later ported as a DVD TV game. Imouto Paradise! 2 is a sequel to the visual novel Imouto Paradise!, featuring a new cast of characters, but with a similar plot. Both games depict incest.

The gameplay in Imouto Paradise! 2 follows a branching plot line which offers pre-determined scenarios with courses of interaction, and focuses on the appeal of the five female main characters by the player character. A majority of the scenes portray sexual acts between characters. The story follows Keiichi Nanase who is left alone with his five younger sisters when his parents leave to go on an overseas trip. Imouto Paradise! 2 premiered as the sixth best selling visual novel at the time of its release on Getchu.com, and charted once more in June.

Following the visual novel's release, Imouto Paradise! 2 made transitions into other media, one of these being a manga serialized in Enterbrain's Tech Gian magazine between the August 2013 and February 2014 issues. The manga was later published as a single bound volume by Kadokawa Shoten. There was much controversy regarding the manga's content, leading to Kadokawa recalling the publication. An adult original video animation (OVA) series was adapted from Imouto Paradise! 2, spanning two episodes. A light novel, an art book, and audio CDs were also released.

== Gameplay ==
Average dialogue and gameplay in Imouto Paradise! 2, depicting the protagonist Keiichi talking to Momoka.

Imouto Paradise! 2 is an erotic visual novel in which the player assumes the role of Keiichi Nanase. Much of its gameplay is spent reading the text that appears on the screen, which represents the story's narrative and dialogue. The text is accompanied by character sprites, which represent who Keiichi is talking to, over background art. Throughout the game, the player encounters CG artwork at certain points in the story, which take the place of the background art and character sprites. Imouto Paradise! 2 follows a branching plot line with multiple endings, and depending on the decisions that the player makes during the game, the plot will progress in a specific direction.

Being an erotic title, relationships between characters become sexual; scenes of this kind depict a varying combination of masturbation, oral sex and intercourse. Throughout gameplay, the player is given multiple options to choose from, and text progression pauses at these points until a choice is made. Some decisions can lead the game to end prematurely and offer an alternative ending to the plot. To view all plot lines in their entirety, the player will have to replay the game and choose different choices to further the plot to an alternate direction. There are several endings in Imouto Paradise! 2, including a harem ending. (Note: A harem ending is when the protagonist (usually a male) ends up with multiple love interests, instead of choosing one. This may not necessary be the "bad" ending.)

== Plot ==
=== Setting ===
Imouto Paradise! 2 is chronologically set several years after the events of its prequel visual novel Imouto Paradise!. The protagonist from the previous game, Sōichirō Nanase, has had children with each one of the sisters of Imouto Paradise!, as all the characters share the same last name Nanase, as well as the sisters from Imouto Paradise! 2 having similar physical appearances and personalities to their predecessors. Most events in the game take place in the Nanase residence, in which Keiichi, Momoka, Ririna, Yuzu, Chiharu, and Shizuku each have their own bedrooms. There is also a living room, kitchen, bathroom, and back garden.

=== Story and characters ===
The heroines of Imouto Paradise! 2 (from left to right): Momoka, Chiharu, Yuzu, Ririna, and Shizuku.

The story follows Keiichi Nanase (七瀬 恵一, Nanase Keiichi; voiced by: Jun Shita), who is the main character. Keiichi is a perverted but friendly older brother to his five blood-related younger sisters. When his parents are on an overseas trip, he is left alone with his sisters, one of his sisters being Momoka Nanase (七瀬 桃花, Nanase Momoka; voiced by: Airi Himekawa). Momoka is the first sister introduced in the game. She is devoted to her older brother, and like her Imouto Paradise! counterpart Aya, she likes committing herself to household jobs. She has a generally cheerful personality, and she is quick to forgive due to her innocence, though she is quite strict at times. Ririna Nanase (七瀬 理々奈, Nanase Ririna; voiced by: Mao Tachibana) is the second sister. She is very intelligent, and good at studying, but quick tempered. Keiichi notes that she is a top student in all areas, and is like the disciplinarian in the family.

The third sister is Yuzu Nanase (七瀬 柚子, Nanase Yuzu; voiced by: Yaya Kinoshita). She is often teased by her older brother, Keiichi, this is due to her innocent and naive nature. She has little knowledge of sexual topics. Chiharu Nanase (七瀬 千春, Nanase Chiharu; voiced by: Akane Ueda) is the fourth sister, she is always cheerful and knows how to brighten up a mood. She likes anime and manga, and plays games together with her older brother. She is a member of the cheerleading squad. The fifth and final sister is Shizuku Nanase (七瀬 しずく, Nanase Shizuku; voiced by: Maya Suzuya). Shizuku likes to read books, and from this, she has gained sexual knowledge and sex techniques, making her quite knowledgeable in that area.

== Development and release ==
The production of Imouto Paradise! 2 began after Moonstone Cherry's previous visual novels, Imouto Paradise! and Houkago Eroge Bu!. Moonstone Cherry is a sub-brand of Moonstone, which is best known for developing visual novels such as Gift and Clear, one of them having a TV anime adaptation. Itou Life worked on the directing and character designs in Imouto Paradise! 2, as he did in Imouto Paradise!. The scenario for Imouto Paradise! 2 was written by Minase Takumi, Takamura Hadzuki, and Izumi Manyoru. Aoshima Shuuzou arranged the visual novel's soundtrack.

Moonstone Cherry first released a free trial of the game for download on the official website on April 18, 2013. Imouto Paradise! 2 was released by Moonstone Cherry for Windows PCs as a DVD ROM on May 31, 2013, compatible up to Windows XP/Vista/7/8. Pre-orders of the game were bundled with a bonus drama CD. Merchandise such as dakimakura covers and telephone cards have also been included as a pre-order bonus in reservations.

On the day of the visual novel's release, a promotional event was held in Akihabara stores. Autograph sessions with staff were held, as well as Imouto Paradise! 2 related gifts being handed out. On November 28, 2013, Dennou Club released Imouto Paradise! 2 as a DVD TV game (DVDPG), playable on a DVD player. The next day, the full visual novel was made available via download. Imouto Paradise! 2 was released for mobile social game Nijiyome in April 2014.

== Related media ==
=== Print media ===
A manga (ISBN 978-4047295117) illustrated by Mikage Sikizai was serialized in Enterbrain's seinen manga magazine Tech Gian between the August 2013 and February 2014 issues. All seven chapters of the manga were compiled into one tankōbon volume by Kadokawa Shoten under Enterbrain's Tech Gian Style imprint on April 3, 2014. A digital version of the Imouto Paradise! 2 manga was formerly available on Amazon's Kindle store as an e-book, before being removed. Kadokawa later issued a "voluntary recall" for the manga, in order to avoid "confusion and trouble" for bookstores.

A light novel adaptation (ISBN 978-4894903449) was written by Hiro Masayuki, and illustrated by Itou Life, who was also the visual novel's primary illustrator. Paradigm published the 249-page novel under its Puchipara Bunko imprint on October 11, 2013. A 129-page art book (ISBN 978-4863791862), titled "Imouto Paradise! 2 Visual Fan Book" (妹ぱらだいす! 2 ビジュアルファンブック, Imōto Paradaisu! 2 Bijuaru Fanbukku), was published by Max on September 26, 2014. The book contained character introductions, original illustrations, event and background galleries, production sketches, publicity illustrations, and a long interview.

=== Music and audio CDs ===
An Imouto Paradise! 2 single was released containing the game's opening theme, "Even More ☆ Paradise!" (ももっと☆ぱらだいす!, Mo Motto ☆ Paradaisu!), and ending theme, "Thinking All the Time" (いつも思うと, Itsumo Omō to), as well as their karaoke, instrumental, and music box versions. Both opening and ending songs are sung by Milk, with composition and arrangement by Aoshima Shuuzou.

Five drama CDs, each focusing on a different sister of Imouto Paradise! 2, were bundled separately as a bonus in pre-orders of the visual novel. The retailers that distributed these CDs are Sofmap, Getchuya, Medio!, Melonbooks, and Amazon. Keiichi is not voiced in any of the drama CDs. On December 27, 2013, a compilation album titled GWAVE 2013 1st Progress was released by Timer Entertainment, containing theme songs from various eroge games, including Imouto Paradise! 2's opening song.

=== Anime ===
A two-episode original video animation (OVA) series was directed by Yanaha Sadayama, and released as two separate DVD volumes on August 3, 2013, and October 4, 2013. The first episode focuses on Ririna, whilst the second episode focuses on Momoka. Both DVDs feature Momoka and Ririna on the cover, and the episodes had a duration of fifteen minutes each, respectively. Unlike the visual novel, Keiichi is fully voiced, credited to Jun Shita in both episodes of the anime. Yuzu, Chiharu, and Shizuku do not make appearances.

==== Episode list ====
No.	Title	Original release date
1	"A Secret Virgin's Break"; Transliteration: "Himitsu no Vājin Bureiku" (Japanese: ヒミツのヴァージンぶれいく)	August 3, 2013
Keiichi finds out one of his younger sister Ririna's dark secrets. Ririna has sexual intercourse with Keiichi, thinking it will persuade him not to tell anybody else about her secret. Keiichi's other younger sister, Momoka, is introduced.
2	"Break the Hogging Virgin"; Transliteration: "Gekan Hitorijime, Vājin Bureiku" (Japanese: 下巻 独り占め、ヴァージンぶれいく)	October 4, 2013
Keiichi accidentally splashes Momoka with water, resulting in her clothes being soaked. Later, Keiichi asks her a favor, which she misunderstands as something else. After Keiichi tells her he just wanted to borrow some pencil lead, Momoka and Keiichi end up "trying out some things".

== Reception and controversy ==
On Getchu.com, a major redistributor of visual novel and domestic anime products, Imouto Paradise! 2 ranked as the sixth best selling visual novel for the month of its release. In June, the game charted further at No. 26. During the first half of 2013, Imouto Paradise! 2 was the eighteenth most widely sold visual novel on Getchu.com, and furthermore, was the twenty ninth most widely sold visual novel for the entirety of the year. In Getchu.com's voting results for May 2013, Imouto Paradise! 2 was voted to be the ninth best visual novel of the month. Imouto Paradise! 2 won a gold prize in the system department from Moe Game Award 2013, with Tonari no Puu-san and Kurano-kunchi no Futago Jijou also receiving prizes.

DMM produced a mobile app card battle game called Moonstone ☆ Princess Collection for iOS and Android, with erotic content. The app includes characters from Imouto Paradise! 2 and other adult visual novels developed by Moonstone. In the game, the player can complete quests and battle opponents in ranked matches.

The Imouto Paradise! 2 manga was designated as an "unhealthy publication" by the Tokyo Metropolitan Government, due to its "glorification of incestuous acts". It was the first publication to be formally restricted as such by the government since Bill 156 revised the law in 2010. Bookstores in Japan became prohibited from selling or renting the particular book to minors under the age of 18, and they are also not permitted to browse the book. Bookstores have been legally obligated to separate and place the book in an adult section. Amazon has removed the Imouto Paradise! 2 manga from its Kindle store, despite the fact that the book had ranked number one on Amazon's comic bestseller list for Kindle. Publisher Kadokawa Shoten issued a "voluntary recall" for the Imouto Paradise! 2 manga, and it is uncertain whether the company will protest the government's decision and other matters. A representative of Kadokawa has stated, "We have not received the official notice from Tokyo, so we wish to refrain from commenting. After we receive the notice, we want to consider the action we will take moving forward."

Responses to the restriction and ban of the Imouto Paradise! 2 manga were generally negative. The Comic Book Legal Defense Fund requested that Dan Kanemitsu, a blogger, and a Japanese-to-English translator who has worked on translating many anime, weigh in on the situation. Kanemitsu criticized the government, saying, "We should always be careful when start to entrust the government with discriminatory policies, be that against people, sexuality, or mediums of self-expression. How would you like it if someone told you homosexuality could be tolerated in only certain mediums, or that you may dance to waltz music but not to polka tunes?" Kanemitsu concluded his interview, saying, "If unchecked, the logic behind how Imouto Paradise 2 was designated harmful to minors can be employed by those in power to enforce their own brand of morality upon the public."

Patrick W. Galbraith, the author of The Moe Manifesto, (Note: The Moe Manifesto is a book written by Patrick W. Galbraith, containing interviews between the author and various Japanese creators and critics. They discuss the term 'moe', and what it defines.) was interviewed in the Otaku USA magazine. Galbraith was asked whether Imouto Paradise! 2 falls into the 'moe' category, to which he replied, "Well, it's an adult manga based on an erotic visual novel, so I'd say that it's wank material. It's not exactly mainstream manga, you know? Where it might overlap with the moe phenomenon, though, is that you have really cute characters and people who are into those characters." Furthermore, he commented on the restriction of the Imouto Paradise! 2 manga, saying that, "I don't think that it's surprising that they took on Imouto Paradise, because it's got a decent fan following, has an emphasis on incest, which is one act specifically mentioned in the ordinance, and the characters are marked by a kind of cuteness that's worrisome for a lot of people, because cuteness often bleeds into youthfulness." Like Kanemitsu, Galbraith showed distaste towards the government's decision to restrict the manga, saying that he "is not a fan" of this ordinance.
