= Kanojo × Kanojo × Kanojo =

Japanese erotic visual novel and its franchise

- Kanojo × Kanojo × Kanojo: Sanshimai to no Dokidoki Kyōdō Seikatsu
- Original visual novel cover for Windows (Left, middle and right: Mafuyu, Akina and Natsumi).

彼女×彼女×彼女～三姉妹とのドキドキ共同生活～
- Genre: Erotic comedy, harem
- Video game
- Developer: ωstar
- Publisher: Omega Star (Windows); Palace (PSP); Mints (DVDPG)
- Genre: Eroge, Visual novel
- Platform: Windows, PlayStation Portable, DVD TV game
- Released: JP: May 30, 2008 (Windows); JP: June 11, 2010 (PSP); JP: October 19, 2012 (DVDPG)
- Video game

Kanojo × Kanojo × Kanojo Dokidoki Full Throttle!
- Developer: Crossnet
- Publisher: Omega Star (Windows); Palace (PSP); Mints (DVDPG)
- Genre: Eroge, Visual novel
- Platform: Windows, PlayStation Portable, DVD TV game
- Released: JP: February 27, 2009 (Windows); JP: December 17, 2010 (PSP); JP: November 16, 2012 (DVDPG)
- Original video animation
- Directed by: Kōsuke Murayama
- Produced by: MS Pictures
- Studio: Studio Eromatick
- Licensed by: NA: Kitty Media
- Released: December 25, 2009 – May 20, 2011
- Runtime: 30 minutes each
- Episodes: 3
- Original video animation

Kanojo × Kanojo × Kanojo Full Version
- Directed by: Kōsuke Murayama
- Produced by: MS Pictures
- Studio: Studio Eromatick
- Released: April 19, 2013
- Runtime: 90 minutes

Kanojo × Kanojo × Kanojo: Sanshimai to no Dokidoki Kyōdō Seikatsu (彼女×彼女×彼女～三姉妹とのドキドキ共同生活～) is a Japanese erotic visual novel developed by Crossnet, and released for Windows PCs on May 30, 2008. Kanojo × Kanojo × Kanojo was later released for the PlayStation Portable, and as a DVD TV game. A sequel visual novel, titled Kanojo × Kanojo × Kanojo Dokidoki Full Throttle!, was released as a PC game for Windows on February 27, 2009, and later released as a PSP game and DVD TV game as well. The story follows Shiki Haruomi, who begins living with three beautiful sisters after the volcano on his home island erupts.

Kanojo × Kanojo × Kanojo premiered as the sixth best selling visual novel in the month and year of its release on Getchu.com. The gameplay in Kanojo × Kanojo × Kanojo follows a branching plot line which offers pre-determined scenarios with courses of interaction, and focuses on the appeal of the three female main characters by the player character. A hentai original video animation (OVA) series was produced, containing three episodes. Other media such as art books, and various merchandise were also released.

== Gameplay ==
What gameplay looks like in Kanojo × Kanojo × Kanojo. Here, Shiki is conversing with (left to right) Akina, Midori, and Suzuran.

Kanojo × Kanojo × Kanojo is an erotic visual novel in which the player assumes the role of Shiki Haruomi. Much of its gameplay is spent reading the text that appears on the screen, which represents the story's narrative and dialogue. The text is accompanied by character sprites, which represent who Kyōtarō is talking to, over background art. Throughout the game, the player encounters CG artwork at certain points in the story, which take the place of the background art and character sprites. Kanojo × Kanojo × Kanojo follows a branching plot line with multiple endings, and depending on the decisions that the player makes during the game, the plot will progress in a specific direction.

Throughout gameplay, the player is given multiple options to choose from, and text progression pauses at these points until a choice is made. Some decisions can lead the game to end prematurely and offer an alternative ending to the plot. To view all plot lines in their entirety, the player will have to replay the game multiple times and choose different choices to further the plot to an alternate direction. Throughout gameplay, there are scenes depicting Shiki and a given heroine having sex. Scenes of this kind depict a varying combination of masturbation, oral sex and intercourse.

== Plot and characters ==
The main protagonist is Shiki Haruomi (志木 春臣, Haruomi Shiki; voiced by Tanaka Momotarō), a handsome boy who is considerably strong, due to his fishing experience on the island. He is generally calm and collected. Shiki moves into a relative's house after a volcanic eruption occurs on his home island, and in the relative's house, there are three beautiful sisters who happen to be his childhood friends, one of them being Akina Orifushi (織節 秋奈, Orifushi Akina; voiced by Miyabi Arisugawa). Akina is the second eldest of the sisters, and out of the three, is the most loving towards Shiki. She is popular at school, being a perfectionist and an honor student. Whilst Akina is usually sweet and kind, she does have a jealous side. Though not being the eldest, Akina excels at studies, sports, and housework.

The eldest sister is Natsumi Orifushi (織節 夏実, Orifushi Natsumi; voiced by Kotone Hirokawa), who became the manager of Min-Min Ice Creamery after the sisters' parents died. Natsumi has a hard time resisting alcohol, and can become tipsy just with its scent. She is gentle, unfussy, and has a polite-manner way of speaking; however, when she drinks, she becomes aggressive. Natsumi's hobbies include fortune telling, she loves to tell other people's fortunes, as well as her own. She likes to call Shiki "Haru-chan", due to her thinking it's more friendly. The youngest sister is Mafuyu Orifushi (織節 真冬, Orifushi Mafuyu; voiced by Kana Nojima), who is two grades below Shiki. Mafuyu has a quiet and stoic personality, and because of this, her mood can be hard to read. Despite this, Mafuyu is sexually curious and likes to read erotic novels. Shiki accidentally sees her masturbating a few times.

Shiki also becomes enrolled at Akina's school, where he gets acquainted with three other characters, among them being his class president Midori Byakudan (白檀 翠, Byakudan Midori; voiced by Ayane Mikoto). Midori, for some reason, holds a grudge against Shiki. She is somewhat stern, and very intelligent, often quoting famous sayings, and proverbs. Midori has a best friend called Suzuran Himenohara (姫野原 鈴蘭, Himenohara Suzuran; voiced by Runa Sakaki), a shy, bespectacled girl who is also Shiki's classmate. She fell in love with Shiki at first sight, causing her to stalk him regularly. Suzuran rarely ever talks, but instead communicates by floriography. Shiki befriends a boy in his class called Tsukasa Honnouji (本能寺 司, Honnouji Tsukasa; voiced by Ichiro Tanaka), who, despite being good-looking, is unpopular with girls. This is due to his cowardly and immature nature. Tsukasa dislikes this fact about himself and wishes to be more popular with girls. He feels that Shiki has outclassed him in this respect, but still treasures Shiki as a friend.

== Development ==
Kanojo × Kanojo × Kanojo is the eighth visual novel Crossnet has developed, after Crossnet's previous visual novel Ayakashi, which spawned a TV anime and manga series. The characters of Kanojo × Kanojo × Kanojo are designed by Jin Happoubi, who is known for his character designs in the Boin series. Neko Kosume and Izumi Banya are the visual novel's scenario writers, whilst music is provided by a Japanese music production company called Angel Note. The opening of the game, "Kanojo × Kanojo × Kanojo ~Hold Me Tight Tonight~" (彼女×彼女×彼女 ～今夜はぎゅっと抱きしめてね～, Kanojo × Kanojo × Kanojo ~Kon'ya wa Gyutto Dakishimete ne~), is sung by Mami Nakayama. Full Throttle!, Kanojo × Kanojo × Kanojo's sequel, is set a year after the events of the first game, and a yaoi ending with Tsukasa becomes available.

=== Release history ===
Omega Star first released Kanojo × Kanojo × Kanojo for Windows PCs as a DVD ROM on May 30, 2008. The visual novel was later ported to a PlayStation Portable console on June 11, 2010, by PalaceGame, a UMD publisher. Kanojo × Kanojo × Kanojo was released as a DVD TV game on October 19, 2012, by Mints. A sequel visual novel titled Kanojo × Kanojo × Kanojo Dokidoki Full Throttle! (彼女×彼女×彼女 ドキドキ フルスロットル！) was released for Windows PCs as a DVD ROM on February 27, 2009. On December 17, 2010, PalaceGame released a PSP port for Full Throttle!, it was also released as a DVD TV game by Mints on December 16, 2012. Both games, Kanojo × Kanojo × Kanojo, and Full Throttle!, were bundled together and released as a pack on December 18, 2012.

== Related media ==
=== Merchandise ===
Merchandise has been produced based on the game. PVC character figures that depict the sisters of Kanojo × Kanojo × Kanojo were produced by Milk Pot. The first of these was of Akina, released on March 31, 2012. A limited edition of the Akina figure was released the same day, sporting the same design, but a different colored uniform. Another figure of Akina was released by Milk Pot on April 22, 2014. PVC figures for Mafuyu and Natsumi were released November 30, 2012 and May 31, 2013. Another version of the Mafuyu figure was released on May 31, 2014. A painted polystone figure depicting Natsumi lying down is to be released by Blackberry on March 31, 2015. Dakimakura cases were produced, each featuring a different sister, various tapestry, and masturbation toys were also released.

=== Books and publications ===
A 176-page art book, titled Kanojo × Kanojo × Kanojo Jin Happoubi Art Works (彼女×彼女×彼女 八宝備仁アートワークス, Kanojo × Kanojo × Kanojo Happōbijin Ātowākusu; ISBN 978-4-86252-819-3), was published by Core Magazine on June 30, 2010. The book contains illustrations from the game, and interviews from staff. Oaks published a mook on September 25, 2010, titled Zeppan Hakkin Eroge (絶版発禁エロゲ, ISBN 978-4-7990-0023-6), which features content from Boin, Resort Boin, and Kanojo × Kanojo × Kanojo, with the addition of its sequel Full Throttle!.

=== Anime ===
A three-episode hentai original video animation (OVA) series directed by Kōsuke Murayama, was produced by Studio Eromatick, and distributed by MS Pictures under its Platinum Milky label. All three episodes were released as both a Blu-ray Disc (BD) and DVD. (Note: Kanojo × Kanojo × Kanojo is one of the few hentai titles to be released in high-definition.) The first episode was released on December 25, 2009, and the limited edition DVD of the first episode comes bundled with character artwork and a CD. Kanojo × Kanojo × Kanojo's second episode was released on June 18, 2010. Lastly, the third and final episode was released on May 20, 2011. All three episodes were later compiled into one 90-minute-long OVA titled Kanojo × Kanojo × Kanojo Full Version, which was released as a BD and DVD on April 19, 2013. Additional scenes are added into the full version. The three episodes were licensed and released on DVD and Blu-ray by Kitty Media in 2016 with an English dub.

==== Episode list ====
No.	Title	Original release date
1	"Meetings Are Gentle, Firm, Imp Paradise"; Transliteration: "Tokai wa Ottori, Shikkari, Koakuma Paradaisu" (Japanese: 都会はおっとり、しっかり、小悪魔パラダイス)	December 25, 2009
Shiki arrives at the Orifushi household and reunites with the three sisters, Akina, Natsumi, and Mafuyu, who are his childhood friends. He soon starts going to Akina's school, where he learns she is the school idol, and has a strange encounter with Suzuran, one of Akina's friends.
2	"Meeting in Toilet, Infirmary, and Maid Paradise"; Transliteration: "Tokai wa Toire, Hokenshitsu, Meido Paradaisu" (Japanese: 都会はトイレ、保健室、メイドパラダイス)	June 18, 2010
When rushing to the school toilets, Shiki accidentally bumps into Suzuran, who brings him into the ladies' restroom and has sex. Later that day, Shiki ends up having group sex with Midori and Suzuran in the infirmary, when Midori insists that Shiki break up with Suzuran (though this is a misunderstanding), and in return, Shiki can do whatever he wants to Midori.
3	"Meeting at the Festival, Bath and Harem Paradise"; Transliteration: "Tokai wa Omatsuri to Ofuro to Hāremu Paradaisu" (Japanese: 都会はお祭りとお風呂とハーレムパラダイス)	May 20, 2011
Shiki has sexual intercourse with all three Orifushi sisters dressed up as maids, which they call "service". The Min-Min Ice Creamery service, which Natsumi runs, has problems, causing Natsumi to doubt herself. She makes Shiki work hard while she, Akina, and Mafuyu are at a festival.

== Reception ==
On Getchu.com, a major redistributor of visual novel and domestic anime products, Kanojo × Kanojo × Kanojo ranked as the sixth best selling visual novel in the month of its release, behind Moonstone's visual novel Clear, which ranked fifth. The game charted further the next month, ranking at No. 20. According to Getchu.com, during the first half of 2008, Kanojo × Kanojo × Kanojo was the 20th most widely sold PC game. Furthermore, it was the 38th most widely sold PC game in that year.

Full Throttle! ranked as the fourth best selling PC game during the month of its release on Getchu.com, whilst August's visual novel Yoake Mae yori Ruriiro na ranked No. 1 that month. However, the game failed to chart further in March. Full Throttle! was the 17th most widely sold PC game during the first half of 2009, and the 37th most highly sold visual novel of the year.

=== Controversy ===
An eroge called Paizuri Cheerleader VS Sakunyuu Ouendan! was released by Marine for Windows PCs on September 24, 2010. It was reported on New-akiba.com, a Chiyoda based online magazine for Akihabara, that Paizuri Cheerleader allegedly plagiarized one of the CG (computer graphics) samples from Kanojo × Kanojo × Kanojo, which was released about two and a half years before Paizuri Cheerleader, the visual novel in question.
