= Clearer =

Clearer may refer to:

- Clearing house (finance)
- Yarn clearer
