= Yukiwo =

Japanese manga artist

Yukiwo (ユキヲ) is a Japanese male illustrator and adult game artist from Tokyo. He illustrated the manga adaptations to two visual novels developed by Moonstone: Gift, and Clear. His seinen manga Musashino-sen no Shimai has been made into a live action film. It premiered in Japanese theaters on November 17 of 2012. Yukiwo is also the illustrator of the light novel Noucome. His manga Dropkick on My Devil! received an anime adaptation in 2018.

== Works ==
=== Artbook ===
- nouvelle vague - published by Core Magazine

=== Manga ===
==== Original ====
- Dropkick on My Devil! - 2012
- JJ Doctor with T - 2015
- Marika-chan Otsu - 2010
- Musashino-sen no Shimai - 2007
- Oyoshi ni Natte! Ranmaru-san - 2012
- Uchū Pharaoh ☆ Patra-chan - 2014

==== Adaptation ====
- Clear: Itsuka Tatta Ano Oka de... - 2007 (Moonstone)
- Gift ~under the rainbow~ - 2006 (Moonstone)
- Tayutama: Kiss on my Deity - 2009 (Lump of Sugar)

=== Visual novels ===
- Hyper→Highspeed→Genius - 2011 (Windmill)
- Gemini - 2004 (Moonstone)
- Kizumono no Gakuen 3: Heaven's Door - 2007 (Rasen)
- RPG Gakuen (guest artist) - 2010 (Circus)

=== Light novels ===
- Noucome - 2012
