= Clearing =

Clearing or The Clearing may refer to:

== Arts and media ==
- The Clearing (EP), a 2006 EP by Weatherbox
- The Clearing (film), a 2004 drama film
- The Clearing (Homeland), an episode of the American television series Homeland
- The Clearing (podcast), a 2019 true crime podcast
- The Clearing (TV series), 2023

=== Albums ===
- Clearing (Fred Frith album), 2001
- Clearing (Hyd album), 2022
- The Clearing (Locrian album), 2011
- The Clearing (Sleep for Sleepers album), 2009
- The Clearing (Wolf Alice album), 2025

== Ecology ==
- Clearing (forest), a tract of land with few or no trees in the middle of a wooded area
- Clearing (geography), the process by which vegetation is permanently removed
- Deforestation, the clearing away of trees to make farmland

== Economics and finance ==
- Clearing (finance), the process of settling a transaction after committing to it
- Market clearing, the matching of supply and demand via price movement

== Other uses ==
- Clearing, Chicago, a community area in Illinois, U.S.
- The Clearing (Ellison Bay, Wisconsin), also known as The Clearing Folk School
- Clearing (telecommunications), the disconnecting of a call
- Yarn clearing, in textile industry
- Clearing, a practice in Scientology
- Clearing, a process used by the UK's Universities and Colleges Admissions Service (UCAS)

== See also ==
- Clear (disambiguation)
- Clearance (disambiguation)
