= Clere =

Clere is a surname. Notable people with the surname include:

- Alice Clere (died 1538), daughter of Sir William Boleyn
- Edward Clere (MP) (1536–1606), English politician
- Edward Clere (born 1974), American politician
- John Clere (disambiguation), multiple people
- Thomas Clere (died 1545), courtier and poet at the court of Henry VIII

== See also ==
- Clear (disambiguation)
- Cleare, a surname
- Cleere, a surname
