= Cleage =

Cleage is a surname. Notable people with the surname include:

- Albert Cleage (1911–2000), American Congregationalist minister, political organizer, and author
- Pearl Cleage (born 1948), African-American author
- Ralph Cleage (1898–1977), American baseball player

== See also ==
- Cleare
