= Mai-chan's Daily Life =

Japanese manga series

- Cover of the first volume

まいちゃんの日常 (Mai-chan no Nichijō)
- Manga

Game Over
- Written by: Uziga Waita
- Published by: Sanwa Shuppen
- Imprint: Sanwa Comics
- Magazine: Ayla Deluxe
- Published: February 24, 2003
- Volumes: 1
- Manga
- Written by: Waita Uziga
- Published by: Sanwa Shuppen
- Imprint: Sanwa Comics
- Magazine: Ayla Deluxe
- Published: April 21, 2004
- Volumes: 1
- Live-action film

MAI CHAN'S Daily Life: THE MOVIE
- Directed by: Sado Satō
- Written by: Sado Satō
- Released: November 29, 2014
- Runtime: 63 minutes

Mai-chan's Daily Life (Japanese: まいちゃんの日常, Hepburn: Mai-chan no Nichijō) is an ero guro manga series written and illustrated by Uziga Waita. It was published by Sanwa Shuppan on April 21, 2004, and serialized in Ayla Deluxe magazine. The manga was adapted from a previous manga written and illustrated by Uziga called Game Over, a compilation of 10 short stories. Two chapters were about Mai's story, the second chapter, "Mai-chan's Secret", and the third, "Mai-chan's Daily Life". Game Over was published on February 24, 2003, by Sanwa Shuppen and serialized in Ayla Deluxe magazine.

A live-action film adaptation was released on November 29, 2014, directed and written by Sado Satō. An Koshi played the title role of Mai-chan.

== Plot ==
A young maid named Mai happens to have regenerative abilities, and her mistress forces her to participate in sexual acts with customers, who are allowed to do whatever they want to her. She's immortal as well as being able to regenerate, as is a young boy called Kizuna. A life of being sexually humiliated and dismembered daily ensues.

== Characters ==
- Mai: The title character. She is an innocent, clumsy, 17-year-old maid who is immortal and has the power to regenerate.
- Kaede: Kaede is the chief maid of the mansion and has a very sadistic personality. She enjoys the misfortune of Mai, who is sexually tortured every day. However, she does somewhat grow attached to Mai. She is a major character in Waita's non-guro manga Fragile but it is not elaborated if the two manga exist in the same timeline
- Kizuna: A young boy who is a masochist and in the same constitution as Mai. Like Mai, he also has the power to regenerate.
- Sayurin: Kaede's "pet", a human with amputated limbs who appears to lack communication skills. She was also forced to be sexually tortured but lacks immortality, unlike Mai, and is eventually accidentally killed. She is the protagonist of Waita's non-guro manga Fragile but it is not clarified if the two manga exist in the same timeline.
- George Reitman: The "President of 'A' country" and one of the customers of the mansion. He threatens to take Mai away to be used as a lab experiment, but Kaede saves Mai from this worse fate by impaling him in the skull (Kaede does not want to lose Mai because she is one of her "pets").
- Elmo Muraki: A young girl and customer of the mansion. She buys Kizuna as a sex slave.

== Media ==
=== Chapters ===
No.	Title	Release date	ISBN
1	Game Over	February 24, 2003	4883561658
1. News; 2. Mai-chan's Secret; 3. Mai-Chan's Daily Life; 4. Hao Chi Feng Jiao; 5. Song of the Dull Knife; 6. Dining Table Banquet; 7. Game Over; 8. The Lawless Area of Oz; 9. Jingle Bells; 10. Guts Marin

No.	Title	Release date	ISBN
1	Mai-chan's Daily Life (まいちゃんの日常)	April 21, 2004	978-4883562473
1. The Immortal Maid; 2. Scary, Scary Kaede; 3. Mai-chan's Home Cooking; 4. Mai-chan's Outing; 5. Sharpening New Products; 6. Would You Do Me a Favor?; 7. Mai-chan's Brother?; 8. Amateur Fights; 9. Impossible!; 10. Please, Just a Glimpse; 11. Mai-chan's Choice; 12. I'll Do My Best; 13. Closing Comic: Mai-chan's Secret

=== Live action film ===
A live-action film adaptation entitled MAI CHAN'S Daily Life: THE MOVIE was announced on March 14, 2014, by the manga creator Waita Uziga. Casting choices for the film included An Koshi as the title character, Mai-chan, Miyako Akane as a new character named Miyako, Soaco Roman as the head maid, and Shogo Maruyama as the residence's master. The film was directed and written by Sado Satō and supervised by Uziga Waita. The film was released on November 29, 2014, and had an English release on September 20, 2016.

== Reception ==
The manga is well known for its grotesque material, and two scenes nearing the manga's end have become a popular internet meme and subject on 4chan. The title was included in She's Lost Control's "A Beginner's Guide to Eff'd-Up Hentai", including Night Shift Nurses, Imouto Paradise!, and Bible Black.
