= Imouto Paradise! =

2011 Japanese visual novel

- Imouto Paradise! Onii-chan to Go nin no Imouto no Ecchi Shimakuri na Mainichi
- Imouto Paradise! visual novel cover

妹ぱらだいす! 〜お兄ちゃんと5人の妹のエッチしまくりな毎日〜 (Imōto Paradaisu! 〜Onii-chan to Go nin no Imouto no Ecchi Shimakuri na Mainichi〜)
- Genre: Harem
- Video game
- Developer: Moonstone Cherry
- Publisher: Moonstone Cherry (PC); M-Trix (Android); Dennou Club (DVD Player); MangaGamer (PC)
- Genre: Eroge, Visual novel
- Platform: Windows, Android, DVD Player
- Released: JP: January 28, 2011 (PC); JP: July 29, 2011 (Android); JP: September 29, 2011 (DVD Player); WW: August 22, 2014 (PC)
- Light novel
- Written by: Kurotaki Itoyoshi
- Illustrated by: Ito Raifu
- Published by: Paradigm
- Imprint: Paradigm Novels 499
- Published: April 28, 2011
- Volumes: 1
- Manga
- Written by: Moonstone Cherry
- Illustrated by: Itotin
- Published by: Max
- Magazine: Comic Potpourri Club
- Original run: March 2011 – May 2011
- Original video animation
- Directed by: Teruaki Murakami
- Produced by: Kōichi Murakami
- Written by: Shinichirō Sawayama
- Studio: Anime Antenna Iinkai
- Licensed by: NA: R18.com
- Released: December 9, 2011 – April 20, 2012
- Runtime: 30 minutes each
- Episodes: 2

Imouto Paradise! Onii-chan to Go nin no Imouto no Ecchi Shimakuri na Mainichi (Note: Japanese: 妹ぱらだいす! 〜お兄ちゃんと5人の妹のエッチしまくりな毎日〜; lit. Little Sister Paradise! Older Brother and Your Five Younger Sisters Naughty Spree Every Day) is a Japanese erotic visual novel developed and published by Moonstone Cherry. Imouto Paradise! was first released on January 28, 2011, playable on Windows as a PC game. On July 29, 2011, M-Trix produced an Android version of Imouto Paradise!, and on September 29, 2011, the game was released as a DVDPG edition by Dennou Club. MangaGamer released an English language localization of the game on August 22, 2014. On May 31, 2013, Paradigm published a light novel and an adult manga for Imouto Paradise! serialized in the Comic Potpourri Club magazine. A hentai original video animation series was produced. Moonstone Cherry released a sequel to the first visual novel called Imouto Paradise 2.

== Gameplay ==
An example of what gameplay looks like in Imouto Paradise! Here, Sōichirō is conversing with Rio, Aya, Michika, Koharu and Hiyori.

Imouto Paradise! is an erotic visual novel that takes incest as one of its major themes. In Imouto Paradise!, the player assumes the role of Sōichirō Nanase, who is the main protagonist of the first visual novel, and the older brother of the five date-able heroines presented in the game. In Imouto Paradise! 2, the player assumes the role of Sōichirō's future son, Keiichi Nanase, who is also an older brother of five younger sisters. Much of the gameplay is spent reading text that appears on the bottom of the screen, which represents the story's narrative and dialogue. Text is accompanied by character sprites, whom of which Sōichirō or Keiichi can converse with, over background art. Throughout the game, the player will encounter CG artwork, which replaces the background art and character sprites. Imouto Paradise! offers a branching plot line with multiple endings, and depending on the decisions that the player makes during the game, the plot will progress in a specific direction. There are five plot lines for each heroine that the player will have the chance to experience, and in order to experience all five plot lines, the player will have to replay the game multiple times and experiment with different choices.

The player will also encounter various background music (BGM) throughout the game, different BGMs will play depending on the atmosphere or tone of the scene. All characters are voiced in the game, with the exception of the protagonist, Sōichirō and Sōichirō's father.

Throughout gameplay, the player is given multiple options to choose from, and text progression pauses at these points until a choice is made. Some decisions can lead the game to end prematurely and offer an alternative ending to the plot. To view all plot lines in their entirety, the player will have to replay the game multiple times and choose different choices to further the plot to an alternate direction. Along with choices, the player will also have to select a heroine from the map select screen, which can also affect the ending the player attains. Throughout gameplay, there are scenes depicting the protagonist and a given heroine having sex.

== Plot and characters ==
School has recently just let out for summer vacation, and due to business trips, the main character's parents are overseas. As an older brother, Sōichirō Nanase (七瀬 総一郎) is to spend the summer vacation alone with only his five younger sisters for company, the first being the motherly Aya Nanase (七瀬 綾, Nanase Aya; voiced by: Toa Yukimura). Aya is a cheerful, always smiling, gentle little sister. She enjoys cooking, doing the laundry, cleaning, and other household chores. With both parents away, she looks after everyone. She's always loved her older brother as another guy, and thinking about how she'd want to be lovers with him, it appears that she's interested in sex. ”But I’m his blood-related little sister!” as she takes a step back while worrying about that every day. The second sister is tsundere Rio Nanase (七瀬 理央, Nanase Rio; voiced by: Yui Ogura), she is the stern little sister who watches after the studies of the others. Completely unaccustomed to anything related to sex, she's a late bloomer in that subject matter. Whenever her female siblings start to talk about anything lewd, she gets completely red in the face. Whenever her older brother is in front of her somehow or another she's always angry at him. Though that is the attitude she takes, she actually really likes her older brother. She tries her best to show those feelings of love towards him, but before anyone knows it, she hits him with an elbow. A typical tsundere who can't be honest with herself.

Thirdly, there is mild-mannered Hiyori Nanase (七瀬 日和, Nanase Hiyori; voiced by: Yoshimi Yoshida), Koharu's younger twin sister. Among her siblings she's the most timid. Quick to get flustered. She's always worried about something. Even when there's nothing there she trips and falls. When she was younger, anytime there was a problem her older brother helped her so she is rather pampered. She relies on her older brother so much that she believes that what he says is completely true to the point that when he tells total lies she totally believes him. Hiyori has no experience in sex, but is rather curious about it. Another sister includes spunky Koharu Nanase (七瀬 小春, Nanase Koharu; voiced by: Saori Yukito), Hiyori's older twin sister. Among her siblings she's the most energetic. With few worries, when something crosses her mind, she's a girl that blurts it out without any hesitation. She's open-minded about sex and is a type that is frank and okay with dirty jokes and indecent topics. When her parents are away, she boldly tempts her older brother with sexual advances. It's an established fact that she always outmaneuvers the others. Multi-skilled, she participates in both the tennis and swimming clubs. Due to that, she always eats a lot, but unfortunately none of those nutrients go into her chest. The last sister is the quiet, mysterious Michika Nanase (七瀬 みちか, Nanase Michika; voiced by: Shiho Nakaya), a little sister who shows very little emotion. Her expression generally doesn't change.

She appears to love books as she's always seen walking around with one. Her room is filled with books. She's a bookworm whose thoughts can't be read. But if there's anything sexual going on, she goes after the protagonist relentlessly. This is her way of expressing affection. Believing in the absurd information she read in a book that said, ”In order to become lovers with the person you love, it’s best to train your target,” her aim is to make her older brother her own. She has learnt several sexual techniques from what she has read in books. It just so happens that Sōichirō is constantly having perverted thoughts, and on top of that, his sisters are acting oddly assertive.

== Development ==
Ito Raifu was responsible for the directing and character designs in both games Imouto Paradise! Onii-chan to Go nin no Imouto no Ecchi Shimakuri na Mainichi, and the sequel, Imouto Paradise! 2 Onii-chan to Go nin no Imouto no Motto! Ecchi Shimakuri na Mainichi. Koizumi Hotaru produced both of the games. The scenario for Imouto Paradise! was handled by Kuzumi Takeyuki, Minase Takumi, and Wakase Ryō, it was supervised by Kure. The scenario for Imouto Paradise! 2 was handled by Minase Takumi, Takamura Hadzuki, and Izumi Manyoru. CGs in the game were produced by Rastel, Hinata Nao, En Dori, Ēkichi, and the same group handled CGs for Imouto Paradise! 2, with the addition of Meiki Hito. The design was handled by GETUMEN and Sākitto, in both games. Tetsuya provided background art in both games, with assistance from Izumoji Zensuke in the second game. Rastel, En Dori, Softhouse - Seal, and Grandee provided game animation, in Imouto Paradise! 2 the game animation was provided by Motchi Yuki. Kishimoto Mari, and Aoshima Shūzō provided the music for the first game, whilst Aoshima Shūzō provided the music for the second game. In both Imouto Paradise! and Imouto Paradise! 2, the opening movies were by Hishino Yūki. Kaori was the system supervisor for the two games.

== Release ==
Moonstone Cherry released Imouto Paradise! Onii-chan to Go nin no Imouto no Ecchi Shimakuri na Mainichi as a DVD ROM for the PC on January 28, 2011. Before the official release, a trial edition for Imouto Paradise! was released on December 28, 2010. It was rated 18+, as all games in the Imouto Paradise! franchise are, including the download edition for Imouto Paradise!, which was released on December 9, 2011, and the H Anime Enhanced edition, which was released on March 29, 2013. An Android version of Imouto Paradise! was produced by M-Trix on July 29, 2011, and two months later the game was released for the DVD Player on September 29, 2011, by Dennou Club. An English translation for Imouto Paradise! was released in Europe by MangaGamer on August 22, 2014, and a hard copy version on March 16, 2015.

== Related media ==
=== Print media ===
A visual fan book has been published, (ISBN 978-4048953047), entitled Sister Paradise! Official Visual Fan Book, was published on April 26, 2011, by Kadokawa Group Publishing, and consists of 95 pages. Max has also published a book called Itou Raifu Art Works, which contains illustrations, rough line art, and pinups for the games Imouto Paradise! and Houkago☆Eroge Bu! ~Eroge Seisaku no Tame Onnanoko to Ecchi Shimakuri na Mainichi~, another visual novel developed and published by Moonstone Cherry. The book was released on April 18, 2012, for mature readers. Another related work includes an illustration compilation book commemorating the 10th anniversary of Moonstone. It contains original illustrations and comments from the illustrators of Moonstone's games, comments from various other staff such as scenario writers, and is 144 pages long. The book was published on January 25, 2013.

A light novel (ISBN 978-4894903449), for Imouto Paradise!, was published by Paradigm under Paradigm Novels 499 on April 28, 2011. It was written by Kurotaki Itoyoshi and illustrated by Ito Raifu.

A manga adaptation for Imouto Paradise!, illustrated by Itotin, was published by Max and serialized in the Comic Potpourri Club magazine from March 2011 to May 2011. The manga contains pornographic material, and consists of three chapters.

=== Audio CDs ===
On December 29, 2010, a vocal CD containing four different variations of the opening theme for Imouto Paradise! was released, including the full version of the song, which is three minutes and forty nine seconds long. There was also a karaoke version, which was the same length as the full version, an arranged version, with a length of one minute and fifty three seconds long, and lastly, a guitar arranged version, one minute and twenty seven seconds long. The disc length in entirety is ten minutes and fifty eight seconds long. The vocal CD was released at Comic Market 79.

Two adult drama CDs entitled Oyasumi Mae ni Imōto ni Nuite Morau (おやすみ前に妹にヌいてもらう) were produced by Sofmap, and adapted from the first game, Imouto Paradise!. The first drama CD was produced containing Aya and Rio's stories on August 12, 2011, and the second drama CD was produced on December 16, 2011, containing Hiyori, Koharu and Michika's stories.

=== Anime ===
Two Imouto Paradise! hentai original video animation episodes based on the original game have been produced by MediaBank, directed by Murakami Teruaki, and labelled under Gold Bear. Anime Antenna linkai helped produce the anime. Both episodes ran for 30 minutes each.

The episodes were sold in separate DVD volumes in Japan. Imouto Paradise!'s first DVD volume was released by MediaBank on December 9, 2011, containing the first OVA episode. Its DVD cover art depicts Aya and Koharu. MediaBank released the second DVD volume on April 20, 2012, containing the second OVA episode. The DVD cover art depicts Rio, Hiyori, and Michika. The anime is localized in English on R18.com.

==== Episode list ====
| No. | Title | Original release date |
|---|---|---|
| 1 | "Onii-chan, Fuck Me First"; Transliteration: "Oni-chan, Watashi to Shiyō yo" (Japanese: お兄ちゃん、わたしとしようよっ) | December 9, 2011 |
Sōichirō is woken up by Aya, after having a very erotic dream of her and Rio. Hiyori asks him what masturbation is, which leads to an awkward conversation at the breakfast table. Sōichirō accidentally catches Aya masturbating in her room, whilst she is fantasizing about having sex with him. Soon after, Aya realizes that Sōichirō saw everything. Later, Koharu walks into Sōichirō's room when he is watching porn, that leads to them both having sex. Aya admits to Sōichirō, that even though she's his sister, she thought about him while masturbating, and apologizes before confessing her love, which leads to the two having sex. Whilst the two are laying down together, Sōichirō says that he loves her, and that they are all his precious sisters, which makes Aya question the word sisters in her head. When Hiyori wets herself, she asks Sōichirō if he is going to punish her. He first says no, but then considers this and tries it. Koharu later asks him if he wants to play with her again, and he denies this, saying "the devil made me do it". Aya overhears this, and wonders if he did it with Hiyori and Koharu too, before coming to terms with the fact that he loves all the sisters. Later that day, Rio agrees to let Sōichirō see her breasts, and they end up having sexual intercourse, Rio reluctant at first. The episode ends revealing that Aya was outside the door.
| 2 | "Onii-chan, Let's Do it More!"; Transliteration: "Oni-chan, Motto Shiyō yo!" (Japanese: お兄ちゃん、もっとしようよっ！) | April 20, 2012 |
Sōichirō has yet another erotic dream, with Hiyori and Koharu in it this time. He is once again woken by Aya, however, this time, she has noticed that he has had an erection and wants to please him, by having sex. But before long, Sōichirō has had enough and thanks her. Aya pretends to her sisters that nothing has happened, but she has realized that since they had sexual intercourse for the first time, Sōichirō started to change a little bit, and notes that even if she asks for it, he is never in the mood. She feels like she is being avoided, and doesn't know what to do. Michika notices Aya's strange behavior. After asking to see it, Sōichirō shows Rio what a porn site looks like. She confides to him that she doesn't know much about sex, and wants to know more about it. This leads to Sōichirō and Rio having sexual intercourse. Sōichirō wakes up to find Michika who has tied him to the bed, and she tells him that what he desires is also her desire. They have sex, but Sōichirō avoids coming inside of her, and says that it was really close, to her confusion. He tells her why, and she answers back, "What a shame." Presumably the next day, Sōichirō asks Aya where the others are, and she tells him that Michika is at the library, Koharu is at her club, and that Hiyori and Rio said that they were going to a friend's house. Aya and Sōichirō are alone together. When asked if she was going anywhere, Aya tells him that they are rarely alone together these days, which he agrees to. She tells him that she has a favor to ask of him, which is to take a video of her masturbating. It is shown that it is embarrassing for her, but she wants to turn Sōichirō on. One thing leads to another, and they have sex. Afterwards, it is revealed that the sisters left the house so that they could be alone. They all come up with the conclusion that he won't come inside any of them because he is concerned about Aya. Rio tells them that they suit each other, so they should cheer for them both. In the end, all of the sisters end up fighting over him.

== Theme songs ==
Opening Theme

- "Younger Sister Paradise!" (妹ぱらだいす!, Imōto Paradaisu!)
  Performed by: Miruku
  Lyrics by: Miruku
  Composition and arrangement by: Aoshima Shūzō

Ending Theme

- "Lovely Candy" (ラブリー キャンディ, Raburī Kyandī)
  Performed by: Nagasaki
  Lyrics by: Nagasaki
  Composition by: Fine Chemical
  Arrangement by: Fine Chemical

== Reception ==
Imouto Paradise! and Imouto Paradise! 2 has had good sales overall. In the month and year of its release, Imouto Paradise! came No. 6 on the monthly sale ranking of January 2011, on Gethu.com, a major redistributor of visual novel and domestic anime products. In the following month of February, the game came No. 12, and in March, it ranked No. 19. On Getchu.com, Imouto Paradise! was voted as the 3rd most recommended visual novel game to play, as of January 2011. Astarcube reviewed the game and gave it a score of 79 out of 100. Merchandise for Imouto Paradise! and the game's sequel Imouto Paradise! 2 has also been presented to Japanese market, before and after the games initial releases. Merchandise for Imouto Paradise! and Imouto Paradise! 2 include dakimakura covers, pillow covers, pin-ups, telephone cards with illustrations on them, and several sexual toys.

The anime of Imouto Paradise! was reviewed by Timeenforceranubis of SLC, a hentai review site. It was a generally positive review, saying, "The girls’ voices are spot-on, each having her own manner of speaking (“Tsundere,” “Playful/Seductive,” “Loving,” etc.), but all of them eventually ending up at “desperate and horny,” which they all pull off masterfully." The critic also praises the character designs, facial expressions, and visual styles. However, they criticized, "The visual style isn’t without it’s [sic] problems, however. Very specifically, Hiyori’s eyes are very large, which could be an issue for some people. In addition, the erratic “camera,” while providing a sense of intensity to the sex scenes, doesn't have nearly the same effect outside of them. Rather, it makes the characters hard to focus on." They concluding the review positively, saying, "If you like incest hentai, Imouto Paradise is an absolute must-see, full stop. Those just generally into high-intensity ero-anime, as well as Teruaki Murakami fans, should check it out as well."

=== Cultural impact ===
Imouto Paradise! and its sequel Imouto Paradise! 2 are often compared to anime or manga such as Night Shift Nurses, the Bible Black series, Mai-Chan's Daily Life, and other works that are considered 'gross' or 'immoral', due to Imouto Paradise!'s depictions of incest. This could also be because the Imouto Paradise! 2 manga was designated as an "unhealthy publication" by the Tokyo Metropolitan Government for "glorification of incestuous acts". The title was included on SLC's 'A Beginner's Guide to Eff’d-Up Hentai', which also includes Night Shift Nurses, Bible Black, and Mai Chan's Daily Life.

Imouto Paradise! has made appearances in other media. In the Houkago☆Eroge Bu! ~Eroge Seisaku no Tame Onnanoko to Ecchi Shimakuri na Mainichi~ visual novel, there is a poster on the wall in one of the rooms, depicting Aya from Imouto Paradise!. There are posters depicting characters from other Moonstone games, including Icha Pri! ~Ojousama to Icha Love Ecchi na Mainichi~, and Princess Evangile. In the background of one of the classrooms, there is a collection of Imouto Paradise! figurines and nendoroids designed to look like the sisters.

== See also ==
- Lolicon
- Incest in anime and manga
- List of eroge
