= Clearance =

Clearance can refer to:

== Medicine ==
- Renal clearance ratio, a relative measure of the speed at which a constituent of urine passes through the kidneys
- Clearance (pharmacology), the rate at which a substance is removed or cleared from the body by the kidneys or in renal dialysis

== Engineering ==
- Engineering tolerance, a physical distance or space between two components
  - Hydraulic clearance, in hydraulic systems
  - Clearance in civil engineering, including:
    - The difference between the loading gauge and the structure gauge: the amount of space between the top of a rail car and the top of a tunnel or the bottom of a rail car and the top of rail
    - Air draft, applies to bridges across navigable waterways
    - Clearance car, a type of railroad car used to check clearances around the tracks
- Ride height or ground clearance, the amount of space between the base of an automobile tire and the underside of the chassis

== Finance and trade ==
=== Intellectual property ===
- Collective rights management, the licensing of copyright and related rights
- Sample clearance, legal permission to re-use a recording in another work

=== Other uses in finance and trade ===
- Cheque clearing, the process of transferring value on a cheque from one bank account to another
  - The activity of a clearing house (finance), where a variety of financial instruments are cleared through the issuing institution
- Customs clearance, in international trade, the movement of goods through customs barriers
- Market clearing or equilibrium price, the price at which quantity supplied is equal to quantity demanded
- Closeout (sale), in retail, the final sale of items to zero inventory

== Games and sports ==
- Clearance (cue sports)
- A chess term for removal of pieces so that a bishop, rook or queen is free to move
- In Australian rules football, the clearing of the ball out of a ball-up situation

== Other uses ==
- Authorization or permission from an authority
  - Air traffic control clearance in aviation
  - Security clearance, a status granted to individuals allowing them access to classified information
- Clearance rate, in criminal justice, the number of crimes "cleared" divided by the number reported
- Deforestation, the deliberate clearance of woodland or forest for human development
- The Highland Clearances, eviction of tenants in the Scottish Highlands during the 18th and 19th centuries
- The Lowland Clearances, eviction of tenants as part of the Scottish Agricultural Revolution in the Scottish Lowlands

== See also ==
- Clear (disambiguation)
- Clearing (disambiguation)
