= Maya Suzuya =

Japanese voice actress

- Occupation: Voice actor

Maya Suzuya (鈴谷 まや, Suzuya Maya; born August 21, year of birth unknown) is a Japanese voice actress mainly known for adult games. She was affiliated with Atelier Peach. She is now a freelancer.

== Works in games ==
=== 2009 (As Anzai Sari mainly) ===
- Eve to Iu Na no Omocha - Chizuru
- Wakan Saimin ~Osananajimi no Kanojo wa Saimin Playmates~ - Natori Shouko

=== 2010 ===
- Cthulhu ~Otome no Fureru, Tenshi no Yubisaki~ - Kureo
- Hime to Majin to Koi Suru Tamashii
- JK to Inkou Kyoushi 3 ~Manbiki Shoujo Hen~ - Kuzumori Juri
- Cthulhu ~Great Hunting~
- Megami to Love! ~5nin no Megami-sama to Ichahame Haramase Shinkon Seikatsu~ - Sharu
- Mamasen - Hagumi Tabuchi
- Hissatsu Chikannin II - Rin Koibuchi, Fizz

=== 2012 ===
- Chupi Chupi Otoko no Ko
- Zettai Ryouiki ☆ Sex Royale!! ~Mujintou Okashiai Battle~
- Grand Libra Academy
- Aina - Aina
- Sora to Kumo to Kimi no Koi
- Namima no Kuni no Faust
- Daten no Kioku Series

=== 2013 ===
- Aozora Stripe - Satsuki Tsuruno
- Imouto Paradise! 2 - Shizuku Nanase
- Josou de Haramasete Gaiden ~Kako wa Yuuyami Iro no Shoujo to Tomo ni~ - Shigure Momosato
- Josou Kaikyou - Meguru Munakata
- Moshimo Ossan ga Auction Site de Shiriatta Kyonyuu Gal - Hitomi Shiraishi

=== 2014 ===
- Otome ga Kanaderu Koi No Aria (Kanade Jougasaki)
- Teito Hiten Daisakusen
- Make Me Lover
- AstralAir no Shiroki Towa - Corona
- Pretty x Cation - Komachi Yakuouji
- Ren'ai Made Sentakushi Hitotsu - Karen Hishikawa

=== 2015 ===
- Yuki Koi Melt - Inaba Usagi
- Tokeijikake no Ley Line -Asagiri ni Chiru Hana- -
- Tou no Shita no Exercitus - Luana
- Sono Kojou ni Yuusha Hou Ari! - Mira
- Kami no Rhapsody - Fornisgein
- Sakura no Uta - Natsuko Kuriyama

=== 2016 ===
- Hataraku Otona no Ren'ai Jijou - Sayoko
- Otome ga Irodoru Koi no Essence - Kanade Jougasaki
- Anata o Otoko ni Shite Ageru! - Beniyuki Toumi
- Onii-chan, Kiss no Junbi wa Mada Desu ka? - Saya Seguchi
- Shoujo Minority -Nagusame no Ai-
- Sakura Nova - Arisa Moegihara
- Re: LieF ~Shin'ainaru Anata e~
- Himekoi ＊ Sucreine!

=== 2017 ===
- Ouchi ni Kaeru made ga Mashimaro Desu - Kanon
- Omokage Railback
- Golden Hour - Marika Kitakami
- Ubu na Otome no Ecchi na Onegai - Hozumi
- AstralAir no Shiroki Towa Finale -Shiroki Hoshi no Yume- - Corona
