= CLR =

CLR may refer to:

== Organizations ==
- Chief Langalibalele Rifles, an infantry regiment of the South African Army
- Combat Logistics Regiment, a type of United States Marine Corps regiment
- Commando Logistic Regiment, a logistic regiment of the Royal Marines
- Compagnie Luxembourgeoise de Radiodiffusion, a Luxembourg-based radio-broadcaster, part of RTL Group
- CLR (formerly Computer Language Research), a subsidiary of Thomson Reuters Tax & Accounting
- Council on Library Resources, USA
- Circle of Liberal Reformers, a political party in Gabon
- Central London Railway, which became part of the London Underground

== Publications ==
- California Law Review, a publication by the UC Berkeley School of Law
- Commonwealth Law Reports, reports of decisions of the High Court of Australia
- Introduction to Algorithms by Cormen, Leiserson, and Rivest, nicknamed for its authors' initials

== Technology ==
- "clear" instruction, in some computer programming assembly languages
- Centerline Radius, a term in the tubing industry used to describe the radius of a bend
- Circuit layout record, in the telecommunications industry
- Common Language Runtime, the virtual-machine component of Microsoft .NET
- Compensation Log Record, a type of database log record
- Current-Limiting Resistor, an electronic component
- Mercedes-Benz CLR, a racing-car

== Other uses ==
- Calcium Lime Rust, a household cleaning product
- Cliff Hatfield Memorial Airport, an airport in Calipatria, California
- Coffee leaf rust, a plant disease caused by the fungus Hemileia vastatrix
- Command, Leadership, Resource management, another acronym for Cockpit Resource Management
- Consumer leverage ratio, measure of debt vs income
