= Musashino-sen no Shimai =

Japanese web manga series

- First manga volume cover, depicting Ranko (top left), and Hikaru (bottom right).

武蔵野線の姉妹
- Genre: Slice of life, Lolita, Comedy
- Manga
- Written by: Yukiwo
- Published by: Flex Comix; G-Mode
- Magazine: FlexComix Blood; FlexComix Next; Comic Meteor
- Original run: December 2007 – May 2012
- Volumes: 5
- Live-action film
- Directed by: Junichi Yamamoto
- Produced by: Is.Field
- Music by: AOI
- Released: November 17, 2012
- Runtime: 91 minutes

Musashino-sen no Shimai (Japanese: 武蔵野線の姉妹; "Sisters of Musashino Line") is a Japanese web manga series illustrated and written by Yukiwo that was digitally serialized in three different magazines, from December 2007 to May 2012, and the manga is not ongoing. Ranko and Hikaru, the main characters and sisters in Musashino-sen no Shimai, are voiced in the "+Voice" versions of the manga. The story focuses on the everyday life of the two unemployed sisters living in Tokyo who love Lolita fashion. A live-action film based on the series has been released.

== Plot ==
Two beautiful sisters, Ranko and Hikaru Midorikawa, live in a high-end apartment in Tokyo, and both love Lolita fashion. They live carefree and worry-free lives, as they are NEET. Often the sisters will go to the Akihabara and Shibuya shopping districts to shop for various garments, and converse with people. The sisters are unemployed because Ranko made a fortune off the financial market, and they no longer need jobs. Hikaru takes care of household duties, whilst Ranko surfs the internet and plays games.

One day, Hikaru decides that she and Ranko should no longer be living this kind of lifestyle, and applies herself for a job, a waitress at a maid café. Naturally, Ranko is worried about Hikaru and joins her at the maid café at a daily basis.

== Characters ==
=== Main characters ===
Ranko Midorikawa (緑川 蘭子, Midorikawa Ranko)
Voiced by: Mai Goto (+Voice)
Ranko, or otherwise known as "Ran", is the older of the two sisters, but the shortest. She is 24 years old, but has a somewhat childish, innocent appearance. Like her younger sister Hikaru, Ranko loves anything Lolita and dresses in that fashion. She loves to go on online chat rooms, gamble, and play video games. Other notable traits of Ranko include her preference for fatty foods, such as ramen. Sometimes she will wake up at midnight and eat curry. Thanks to her money making off the financial market, she and Hikaru can live in luxury for the rest of their lives, and unlike Hikaru, Ranko is happy with that.

Hikaru Midorikawa (緑川 ひかる, Midorikawa Hikaru)
Voiced by: Rena Maeda (+Voice)
Hikaru, or otherwise known as "Pandora", is the younger of the two sisters, and also the tallest. She is four years younger than her older sister Ranko, being 20 years old, but may as well be the oldest, as she is more down to earth and caring than her sister, she is also better at household duties. Personality wise, Hikaru and Ranko are very different, except their love for Lolita clothing. Hikaru is socially inept, and worries a great deal. After her sister makes a fortune, Hikaru starts to work at a maid cafe despite the fact she could simply stay at home, or go shopping. Hikaru has a liking for yaoi manga.

== Media ==
=== Manga ===
Yukiwo's Musashino-sen no Shimai first began to be serialized on Flex Comix's FlexComix Blood web magazine, in December 2007. Then, in June 2008, the manga transitioned to the FlexComix Next web magazine. From October 2012 onward, Musashino-sen no Shimai was digitally serialized in G-Mode's Comic Meteor magazine. So far, five tankōbon volumes have been released between July 2009 and May 2012. "+Voice" versions of the manga were published, which includes the voices of two main characters Ranko and Hikaru, who are voiced by Mai Goto and Rena Maeda, respectively.

No.	Release date	ISBN
1	July 25, 2009	978-4-7973-5545-1
2	April 10, 2010	978-4-7973-5917-6
3	November 20, 2010	978-4-7973-6238-1
4	July 12, 2011	978-4-7973-6587-0
5	May 20, 2012	978-4-593-85690-9

=== Film ===
A live-action film for Musashino-sen no Shimai was first announced on Flex Comix's official website in August 2010. Screenplay was written and directed by Junichi Yamamoto, and the film was released by Is.Field as a DVD on November 17, 2012. Music in the film was provided by AOI, and the theme song, "Celebrity NEET" (セレブニート, Serebunīto), was sung by Yumi Matsuzawa. On August 23, 2012, the trailer was published on YouTube.

==== Cast ====
- Ranko Midorikawa - Natsuki Katō
- Hikaru Midorikawa - Sayaka Nakaya
- Eiyu Ryo - Chisato Nakata
- Hitoshi Munakata - Yuki Hiyori
- Shizuru Munakata - Ayaka Komatsu
- Takahiro Todo - Mitsuru Karahashi
- Rin Kono - Yu Toa
- Cop - Ujigami Ichiban
- Nyanpu sama - Koriki Choshu
- Chiba Shigeru - Iwami Yoshimasa
- Hiro Ozaki - Fujii Paige
- Nancy - Katsunobu
- Ken - Kyousuke Hamao
- Montesquieu President - Hitoshi Ozawa
