= Cleere =

Cleere is a surname. Notable people with the name include:

- Nigel Cleere (born 1955), English ornithologist
- Peter "Chap" Cleere (born 1982), Irish politician and hurler
- Séamus Cleere (born 1940), Irish hurler

== See also ==
- Clear (disambiguation)
- Cleare, a surname
- Clere, a surname
- St Cleer, village in Cornwall, England
