= Eddie Clear =

American soccer player

Personal information
- Full name: Edward Clear
- Date of birth: May 15, 1944 (age 82)
- Place of birth: St. Louis, Missouri, U.S.
- Date of death: March 18, 2022
- Place of death: St. Louis, Missouri, U.S.
- Height: 5 ft 10 in (1.78 m)
- Position: Midfielder

Youth career
- 1959-1966: Schumacher, Kutis, White Star FC

Senior career*
Years	Team	Apps	(Gls)
1967–1969	St. Louis Stars	11	(0)

International career
1968	United States	5	(0)
- * Club domestic league appearances and goals

Edward Clear (May 15, 1944 – March 18, 2022) was a retired American soccer defender who earned five caps with the United States national team in 1968.

== Early life ==
He was born on the Northside of St. Louis, Missouri on May 15, 1944, to James, a lifelong civil servant working with the US Postal Service, and Marie Clear, a housewife and part-time waitress. He was the second of five children: his three sisters Carol, Katie, and Mary Bridget, and brother Doug. He grew up playing CYC soccer and baseball for his local Catholic parish team, Holy Rosary. Later he played both sports for his high school, Christian Brothers College. During the years between his school playing days and his professional career, Clear played for several high-profile soccer teams in the St. Louis area: Schumacher, Kutis, and White Star FC.

== Professional ==
He played professionally for the St. Louis Stars in both the National Professional Soccer League and North American Soccer League from 1967 to 1969.

== National team ==
Clear gained his first of five caps with the U.S. national team in a 3–3 tie with Israel. He played the next three games with the U.S., then did not play in the next two U.S. games. His final appearance with the U.S. came in a 1-0 World Cup qualifier victory over Canada on October 27, 1968. He was a substitute for Bob Gansler.

Clear was inducted into the St. Louis Soccer Hall of Fame on November 14, 1996.

== Personal life ==
After his retirement from soccer he married Joan (Hummel) Clear in April 1969. He went on to have 7 children and 13 grandchildren. The couple divorced in 1980. He would later marry Barb (Bilger) Clear, with whom he would remain married until his death. Clear died March 18, 2022, from complications caused from a heart attack he suffered at his South St. Louis home.
