= Clear channel =

Clear channel may refer to:

- iHeartMedia, a US broadcasting company formerly known as Clear Channel Communications.
- Clear Channel Outdoor, an outdoor advertising company currently a subsidiary of iHeartMedia and Mubadala Investment Company.
- Clear-channel station, a regulatory category of AM broadcast stations in North America.
