= Cleare =

Cleare is a surname. Notable people with the surname include:

- Aaron Cleare (born 1983), Bahamian athlete
- Ann Cleare (born 1983), Irish composer
- Cordell Cleare (born 1965), American activist and politician

== See also ==
- Clear (disambiguation)
- Cleere, a surname
- Clere, a surname
