= John Clere =

John Clere may refer to:

- John Clere (MP for Colchester) (by 1479–1539), English Member of Parliament (MP) for Colchester 1512 and 1515
- John Clere (naval commander) (c. 1511–1557), English sailor and Member of Parliament (MP) for Bramber 1542 and 1545, Thetford March 1553 and Norfolk 1555
