= Todd Clear =

American criminologist

Todd R. Clear
- Born: March 15, 1949 (age 77)
- Education: Anderson University (B.A., 1971), State University of New York, Albany (M.A., 1972; Ph.D., 1977)
- Awards: 2004 Bruce Smith Sr. Award from the Academy of Criminal Justice Sciences
- Scientific career
- Fields: Criminal justice
- Institutions: Rutgers University-Newark
- Thesis: The specification of behavioral objectives in probation supervision (1977)

Todd Ray Clear (born March 15, 1949) is an American criminologist and distinguished professor in the school of criminal justice at Rutgers University–Newark.

== Education ==
Clear received his BA in sociology from Anderson University in 1971, and his M.A. and Ph.D. in criminal justice from the State University of New York, Albany in 1972 and 1977, respectively.

== Career ==
Clear's first academic appointment was at the State University of New York at Albany in 1973. He joined the faculty of Rutgers University–Newark in 1978 as a professor in the school of criminal justice, a position he held until 1996. He served as the Associate Dean of the Florida State University College of Criminology and Criminal Justice from 1996 to 1999. From 1999 to 2010, he served as a distinguished professor in the John Jay College of Criminal Justice. In 2010, he became the dean of the Rutgers School of Criminal Justice, a position he held until September 1, 2014, when he was replaced by Shadd Maruna. After serving as interim chancellor of Rutgers University–Newark for six months, he became the provost in January 2014, a position he held for two years. He then returned to the faculty of the university's School of Criminal Justice.

== Research ==
Clear has researched various aspects of crime policy during his career. These include incarceration in the United States and its effects on crime, the effectiveness of prison religion programs, and the effects of individuals often being punished with fines for breaking certain laws.

== Honors, awards and positions ==
Clear has served as president of the American Society of Criminology (2008–2009), The Academy of Criminal Justice Sciences (1999–2000), and The Association of Doctoral Programs in Criminology and Criminal Justice (1998–2006). In 2004, he received the Bruce Smith Sr. Award from the Academy of Criminal Justice Sciences; in 2007, he received the Herbert Bloch Award from the American Society of Criminology.
