= Clear (company) =

UK-based carbon offsetting company

Clear is a UK-based carbon offsetting company, founded in 2007 by Dr Bruce Elliott, Neil Chapman and Ben Hedley.

== UK Government's Quality Assurance Scheme ==
Clear were the first carbon offset company in the world to qualify for the UK Government's Quality Assurance Scheme for Carbon Offsetting. They differentiate themselves by only offsetting using Certified Emission Reductions (CERs) which have been issued every time the United Nations prevents one tonne of Carbon dioxide equivalent being emitted through carbon projects registered with the Clean Development Mechanism (CDM)

== Research ==
Clear has a research arm which has produced a variety of reports on subjects such as the carbon footprint of the UK's speed hump population, and the carbon footprint of a Segway PT and a Formula One car.

== Press ==
There has been some press coverage of Clear, primarily for their unusual products such as Skydiving product and Commuting product and releasing their carbon footprinting intellectual property online in the form of a free carbon audit tool

== See also ==
- Mitigation of global warming
- Business action on climate change
- Emissions trading
