= Moonstone (company) =

Japanese visual novel studio

- Type: Joint stock company
- Industry: Computer games
- Founded: 2003
- Headquarters: Japan
- Products: Visual novels
- Website: moon-stone.jp

Moonstone is a Japanese visual novel studio known for creating adult-oriented bishōjo games. The founding members of Moonstone had once been members of Circus, a similar visual novel studio. After the establishment of Moonstone, a collaboration project between Moonstone and Circus was set up for Circus' game Suika AS+, and then another collaboration project between the two companies was set up for Moonstone's game Gift. On 2009 Moonstone established the sub-brand Moonstone Cherry, which focuses on nukige titles.

== Games produced ==
=== By Moonstone ===
- Ashita Deatta Shōjo (May 30, 2003)
- Imōto Watashi, Donna Koto Datte... (November 28, 2003)
- Doko e Iku no, Ano Hi (June 25, 2004)
- Gift (May 27, 2004)
  - Gift Rainbow-colored Stories (January 27, 2006)
- Clear (August 24, 2007)
  - Clear Crystal Stories (May 3, 2008)
- Maji Suki ~Marginal Skip~ (April 24, 2009)
- Angel Ring (June 25, 2010)
- Princess Evangile (July 28, 2011)
  - Princess Evangile: W Happiness (June 29, 2012)
- Magical Marriage Lunatics!! (September 27, 2013)
- Love Sweets (April 25, 2014)
- Natsu no Iro no Nostalgia (January 30, 2015)

=== By Moonstone Cherry ===
- Icha Pri! ~Ojousama to Icha Love Ecchi na Mainichi~ (December 18, 2009)
- Imouto Paradise! ~Onii-chan to Go nin no Imouto no Ecchi Shimakuri na Mainichi~ (December 28, 2010)
- Houkago☆Eroge Bu! ~Eroge Seisaku no Tame Onnanoko to Ecchi Shimakuri na Mainichi~ (February 25, 2012)
- Imouto Paradise! 2 ~Onii-chan to Go nin no Imouto no Motto! Ecchi Shimakuri na Mainichi~ (April 18, 2013)
- Demon Busters ~Ecchi na Ecchi na Demon Taiji~ (October 31, 2014)
- Imouto Paradise! 3 ~Onii-chan to Go nin no Imouto no Motto! Ecchi Shimakuri na Mainichi~(January 26, 2018)
