= Night Shift Nurses =

Japanese animated series

- North American cover art for Night Shift Nurses: RN's Revenge

夜勤病棟 (Yakin Byōtō)
- Genre: Erotica, Harem, Psychological, Hentai
- Created by: Mink
- Video game

Yakin Byōtō
- Developer: Mink
- Publisher: Mink
- Genre: Visual novel
- Platform: Microsoft Windows 95 or later
- Released: December 22, 1999 – October 31, 2008
- Original video animation

Night Shift Nurses
- Directed by: Nao Okezawa
- Produced by: Hiromi Chiba; Tatsuya Tanaka
- Written by: Ryo Saga
- Music by: Hiroaki Sano
- Studio: Discovery; AT-2 Project
- Released: December 8, 2000 – August 26, 2005
- Runtime: 30 minutes
- Episodes: 10+2 specials (5.5 and 10.5)
- Original video animation

Night Shift Nurses 2
- Directed by: Nao Okezawa
- Written by: Ryo Saga
- Music by: Hiroaki Sano
- Studio: 9 Maiami
- Released: 30 July 2004 – 27 January 2006
- Runtime: 30 minutes
- Episodes: 5
- Original video animation

Night Shift Nurses: Kranke
- Directed by: Nao Okezawa
- Written by: Johichi Michigami
- Music by: Hiroaki Sano
- Studio: Hanjin Animation
- Released: 27 May 2005 – 25 November 2005
- Runtime: 30 minutes
- Episodes: 3
- Original video animation

Night Shift Nurses: Experiment (or Night Shift Nurses 3)
- Directed by: Kinji Yoshimoto
- Written by: Yoshio Takaoka
- Music by: Hiroaki Sano
- Studio: AT-2 Project
- Released: 29 July 2005 – 27 January 2006
- Runtime: 30 minutes
- Episodes: 3
- Original video animation

Night Shift Nurses: Nanase Ren
- Directed by: Teruaki Murakami
- Written by: Osamu Momoi
- Music by: Hideki Yamamoto
- Studio: Flavors Soft; Sugarboy
- Released: 4 December 2005
- Runtime: 34 minutes
- Original video animation

Night Shift Nurses: Kazama Mana
- Directed by: Teruaki Murakami
- Written by: Osamu Momoi
- Music by: Hideki Yamamoto
- Studio: Flavors Soft; Sugarboy
- Released: 17 August 2006
- Runtime: 31 minutes
- Original video animation

Night Shift Nurses: Yagami Yu
- Directed by: Teruaki Murakami
- Written by: Osamu Momoi
- Music by: Hideki Yamamoto
- Studio: Flavors Soft; Sugarboy
- Released: 21 December 2006
- Runtime: 33 minutes

Night Shift Nurses is the North American localization of Yakin Byōtō (夜勤病棟), a Japanese OVA series adapted by Discovery from the visual novel of the same name. It was formerly licensed by Anime 18, and now by Critical Mass Video. The series is particularly notorious for its explicit depictions of rape, necrophilia, sadomasochism, and paraphilia.

== Synopsis ==
=== Setting ===
Night Shift Nurses, as was originally written for the game, takes place in an undisclosed area of Japan, mainly at the fictional St. Juliana Hospital. A majority of the game is portrayed on campus with minor visits to the character's residences and surrounding towns.

=== Plot ===
Yakin Byōto 1: Ryuji Hirasaka is an unemployed, middle-aged Japanese gynaecologist, single, independent, and living on his own. One evening, he receives an email from the fictional St. Juliana Hospital, a local institution, offering him a temporary job opportunity. He contently accepts, scheduling to meet with the president the following day.

That afternoon, semi-formal and with a portfolio, Ryuji commutes to the hospital. After an acquaintance with Ren Nanase, a nurse who escorts him to the president, he is frightened to discover his potential employer is a woman he had brutally raped in the past, Narumi Jinguji. In spite of the excruciating atmosphere, however, Narumi explains her wish to develop a department in the hospital that caters to the sexual interests of patients; in need of his expertise to oversee the operation. Overwhelmed with lewd excitement, Ryuji agrees.

Yakin Byōto 2: A young elite doctor Souichiro Kuwabara couldn't forget his feelings towards Ren Nanase, whom he had fallen in love with back in his training days. He's been switching occupations at different hospitals one after another, to go look for her, and finally he meets her again at the Sei-Katorea General Hospital. However, her attitude was remote and sadly enough his love couldn't be fulfilled. To make things worse and more complicated, he finds a stack of photographs depicting Ren being molested. Ren had been turned into a lewd woman by Hirasaka when she was still working at St. Juliana. He was very disappointed after what he had witnessed to the point where he ends up losing his mind and going insane-(both mentally and sexually).

Yakin Byōto 3: In a rural village, Yotsuya Jiro, a young novelist was lying in front of a hospital after falling off his bike. He was seriously injured with a broken leg, and when he thought he was about to die, a pink-haired nurse named Yuu Yagami, helped him. He was sent into an emergency ward, and he met a beautiful woman, Reika Mikage. She is a director of the hospital, and she asked him to become a test subject. Because he didn't have any relatives, he accepted it. Then, Yuu was supposed to take care of him. Since that day, his fate had changed a lot.

Yakin Byōto Zero: This is the back story of how the genius doctor Ryuuji Hirasaka acquired his perverted pastime as a med school student. He and Narumi Jinguuji are rivals at the top of their class. One day, Narumi tells him that if he can seduce the woman she designates in the 2 weeks before graduation, she'll admit her defeat and do anything he tells her. The girls she suggests are just as beautiful and desirable as herself. Sensing his perverted perceptions transforming into a talent at her tantalizing suggestion, he readily agrees.

== Characters ==
Ryuji Hirasaka (比良坂 竜二, Hirasaka Ryūji)
Voiced by: Nobuo Tobita (Japanese); Bjorkin Stiles, Michael Sanderson (English)
Ryuji Hirasaka is the aforementioned villain protagonist of the series. A knowledgeable practitioner, his life takes a sharp turn when he is invited to direct and corrupt a team of nurses at his new place of work. An unconvicted sex offender, Ryuji is vicious, controlling and intimidating, often cold reading those under him to learn about their vulnerabilities and how to exploit them. He sports a mullet and is bespectacled. He is murdered by Ren at the end of episode 5. In Night Shift Nurses Kranke he has a better ending: he marries Ren and the couple decide to move to the countryside to continue their experiments.

Narumi Jinguji (神宮寺 成美, Jinguji Narumi)
Voiced by: Kaoru Hoshioki (Japanese); Irie, Marcia Belle, Likki Dee Split (English)
Narumi Jinguji is the thirty-two-year-old head practitioner of the St. Juliana Hospital, specializing in gynaecology. Voluptuous and enticing, she arranges to meet with Ryuji one afternoon to offer him the chance to sexually discipline a select group of her nursing staff for the purpose of developing a prostitution ring. As a previous rape victim of her own employee, Narumi exhibits bursts of psychological imbalance and unrest. She is noted for her long green hair. Like Ryuji, she too wears glasses. She commits suicide after attempting to kill Ryuji near the end of episode 5. In Night Shift Nurses Kranke, she is shown attending Ryuji and Ren's wedding.

Ren Nanase (七瀬 恋, Nanase Ren)
Voiced by: Yuu Mikage (Japanese); Lynna Dunham, Kendall Harrison (English)
Bright and friendly, Ren Nanase is a twenty-two-year-old nurse at the St. Juliana Hospital who is arguably the most iconic character of the series. She is the first nurse Ryuji meets and the first who genuinely welcomes him as a friend and superior. When her love for an inpatient boxer, Naoya Ohkawa, is discovered, Ryuji learns of her match fixing and uses it as blackmail. Like the nurses to come, in spite of the abhorrent treatment she receives, Ren develops Stockholm syndrome and becomes emotionally attached to her abuser. Ren is distinguishable by her incredibly long hair, of which is usually tied into a ponytail. It is later revealed that she is pregnant. She is the one who kills Ryuji after he gained back his consciousness. After being arrested she admits that she loves him. In Night Shift Nurses Kranke, she marries Ryuji, lives with him in the countryside, and becomes a "good" wife.

Remi Shinjyo (新城 礼美, Shinjō Remi)
Voiced by: Nana Aikawa (Japanese); Nursey, Lotus, Jessica Thorne (English)
Remi Shinjyo is a twenty-seven-year-old senior nurse of the hospital maternity ward. As a headstrong superior, Remi is outwardly proud, fastidious and authoritative, especially to Ryuji. Although it is not mentioned until later, Remi is responsible for an act of malpractice that resulted in the death of a patient. Ryuji takes advantage of Remi's malpractice and subjects her to inhumane experiments. Like Ren, Remi falls for Ryuji and shows huge interest of wanting to be experimented by Ryuji again. Amongst all the nurses, she is one of the few nurses in the series that is not a virgin.

Ako Fujisawa (藤沢 亜子, Fujisawa Ako)
Voiced by: Saya Tohno (Japanese); Alexis J. Parker, Kay Parrott, Mika Moon (English)
Shy and quiet, Ako Fujisawa is a twenty-three-year-old pharmacist. The daughter of a wealthy family, she is falsely accused of stealing drugs from her department and this is used as the basis for her series of abuse. In much the same fashion as Ren and Remi, Ako develops delusional, obedient feelings for Ryuji. Owing to one of the elements of the show, Ako becomes a coprophile.

Hikaru Kodama (児玉 ひかる, Kodama Hikaru)
Voiced by: Mai Akizuki (Japanese); Syndi Snackwell (English)
Hikaru Kodama is a twenty-one-year-old amateur nurse, newly employed and specializing in pediatrics. As her department suggests, Hikaru absolutely loves children and like them, is energetic. She is the fourth and final nurse to be subjected to Ryuji and by far endures the most inhumane practices in the first phase of the series. It is later revealed that most of the group has to endure the same thing as her. Hikaru is noted for her pigtails and loose socks. She has an adoptive sister, Ai, hospitalized for heart problems. She later admits to have fallen for the doctor. In Night Shift Nurses Kranke, the doctor later does his experiments on both her and her sister. During Ryuji and Ren's wedding, she is the one who catches the bouquet.

Ai Kodama (児玉 あい, Kodama Ai)
Ai Kodama is Hikaru's adopted younger sister and a female patient at St. Juliana Hospital who suffers from a serious heart condition. She has a very close relationship with her older sister.
Voiced by: Asuka Tanii, Mai Akizuki

Dr. Sekigawa (関川, Sekigawa-sensei)
Voiced by: Katsuyuki Konishi

Naoya Okawa (大川 直哉, Okawa Naoya)
Naoya is a professional boxer and a male patient at St. Juliana Hospital who had broken his leg in an accident. He has romantic feelings for Ren, until he found out that she was in a relationship with Ryuji.

Souichiro Kuwabara (九羽原 宗一郎, Kuwabara Souichiro)

Voiced by: Shinji Kawada

Souichiro Kuwabara is a young, seemingly kind-hearted male doctor supposedly in his late 20s who first appears in the second series of Night Shift Nurses-(Night Shift Nurses 2, Yakin Byoutou Ni|夜勤病棟・弐). A few years after St. Juliana closed down due to the strange circumstances that had occurred in the previous series, he gets employed at a different hospital called Sei-Katorea General Hospital-(聖カトレア総合病院|Sei Katorea Sōgō Byōin). Dubbed "The Super Elite Doctor", he gets a lot of admirers from the female staff and a few female patients; his father is a director of two other hospitals that he runs at the same time. Despite appearing to be kind-hearted at first, it turns out to be a facade, and he is revealed to be every bit as depraved and misogynistic as Ryuji Hisakawa, as he starts raping and abusing his female co-workers at the hospital.

Mana Kazama (風間 愛, Kazama Mana)

Voiced by: Nana Nogami (PC game), Emi Motoi (OVA)

Mana is a red-haired nurse employed at the same hospital as Souichiro.

Riuru Kaneshiro (金城 瑠璃, Kaneshiro Riuru)

Voiced by: Asuka Hojo

Riuru is the blonde-haired director of Sei-Katorea General Hospital. She's in a bisexual relationship with Konohara, one of the nurses employed at the hospital; it's revealed that she is futanari.

Karen Konohara (小乃原 香蓮, Konohara Karen)

Voiced by: Maria Asano (PC game), Mari Tomokawa (OVA)

Karen is a blue-haired lesbian nurse at Sei-Katorea General Hospital. She is shown to have a bad temper and has the personality of a typical tsundere character.

Suzuka Nogami (野上 涼華, Nogami Suzuka)

Voiced by: Ayana Sumoto

Suzuka is a lavender haired nurse at Sei-Katorea General Hospital. She is shown to have a habit of shoplifting random merchandise from different stores which she had inherited from her childhood; she has the personality of a young innocent child.

Sayuki Tezuka (手塚 咲雪, Tezuka Sayuki)

Voiced by: Yuki Iwata

Sayuki is an orange-haired nurse at Sei-Katorea General Hospital. She wears her hair up in two side braids; she also suffers from a minor form of Autonomic Ataxia, causing her body to tremble in fear whenever her stress levels get too high.

Jiro Yotsuya (四谷 次郎, Yotsuya Jirō)
Yotsuya is a young novelist who resides in a rural small town village called Tokizaka.

Yuu Yagami (八神 優, Yagami Yuu)

Voiced by: Ayaka Kimura

Yuu is a dark pink haired nurse who works at the same hospital that Yotsuya was staying at after he was injured.

Reika Mikage (御影 麗佳, Mikage Reika)

Voiced by: Mari Oda

Sakurako Kujou (九条 桜子, Kujou Sakurako)

Voiced by: Ren Kashikura

Hiyori Kisaragi (如月 ひより, Kisaragi Hiyori)

Voiced by: Haruka Kurasawa

Shizune Yunagi (夕凪 静音, Yūnagi Shizune)

Voiced by: Miru Takakura

Koko Amamiya (甘宮 心, Amamiya Koko)

Voiced by: Natsu Asaka

Shizuru Hirasaka (比良坂 詩弦, Hirasaka Shizuru)

Voiced by: Himari

Maya Yumizuka (弓塚 麻耶, Yumizuka Maya)

Voiced by: Milk Kano

Eri Kedouin (祁答院 英莉, Kedouin Eri)

== Game ==
The original video game came out first. The adult visual novel Yakin Byōtō (known in North America as Night Shift Nurses) was released in Japan on December 22, 1999. The anime OVA adaptation followed later, premiering on December 8, 2000.

== Anime ==
Night Shift Nurses, originally known in Japan as Night Shift Ward (夜勤病棟) is an adult original video animation based on the visual novel created by Mink. It was released in Japan between December 8, 2000 and January 30, 2004, consisting of 10 episodes. The series was released in North America by Anime 18 between May 14, 2002 and November 8, 2005, consisting of 9 of 10 episodes.

- Night Shift Nurses 1 Karte 2000
- Night Shift Nurses: Kranke 2005
- Night Shift Nurses 2 2004
- Night Shift Nurses 3
- Night Shift Nurses 4

=== Night Shift Nurses 1 Kranke 2000 ===
No.	Title	Original release date
0–OVA	TBA	December 8, 2000
1	"Karte 1"	December 8, 2000
2	"Karte 2"	December 8, 2000
3	"Karte 3"	December 8, 2000
4	"Karte 4"	December 8, 2000
5	"Karte 5"	December 8, 2000
6	"Karte 6"	December 8, 2000
7	"Karte 7"	December 8, 2000
8	"Karte 8"	December 8, 2000
9	"Karte 9"	December 8, 2000
10	"Karte 10"	December 8, 2000

=== Night Shift Nurses - Kranke 2005 ===
No.	Title	Original release date
1	"Night Shift Nurses - Kranke 1"	May 27, 2005
2	"Night Shift Nurses - Kranke 2"	May 27, 2005
3	"Night Shift Nurses - Kranke 3"	May 27, 2005

=== Night Shift Nurses 2 2004 ===
No.	Title	Original release date
1	"Episode 1"	May 27, 2004
2	"Episode 2"	May 27, 2004
3	"Episode 3"	May 27, 2004
4	"Episode 4"	May 27, 2004
5	"Episode 5"	May 27, 2004

== Reception ==
As a result of the unrestrained content of the series, Night Shift Nurses is usually regarded as one of, if not the most graphic hentai ever released. Several minutes of particularly unruly scenes were even banned from North American releases. Industry aggregator Mania.com gave the series an F, citing that although the animation is "clean" and "slick", the quantity of edits made for the American release yields it one that "[...]I in no way [can] recommend."
