= Yarn clearer =

Device to remove faults from yarn

A yarn clearer is a device to remove faults (thick places, thin places, foreign matter) from the yarn. Yarn clearing improves the quality of the spun yarn and hence of the cloth made of it. Clear, uniform yarn is especially important for smooth operation of high-speed textile machinery.

Yarn clearing is usually part of the yarn winding step. The yarn from a number of spinning bobbins, called 'cops', is wound on to larger packages called 'cones' for subsequent processing into fabric. During the winding the yarn was traditionally passed through the narrow slit in a steel plate of a yarn clearer or slub-catcher. The object was to catch thick places, or slubs, which occurred when the spinning process suffered an aberration, and to prevent them being woven into the fabric to present unsightly faults.

In modern textile industry, after detecting the faults, the clearer cuts the faulty pieces from the yarn, and after that the piecing device joins the cut ends.

== See also ==
- Wilson Yarn Clearer
