= Clear (video game) =

Visual novel

- Clear original visual novel cover featuring (from left going clockwise): Haruno, Sayu, Nonoka, Miki and Natsuki.

クリア (Kuria)
- Genre: Romance
- Video game
- Developer: Moonstone
- Publisher: Moonstone (Windows); Sweets (PS2)
- Genre: Eroge, Visual novel
- Platform: Windows, PlayStation 2
- Released: August 24, 2007 (Windows); February 19, 2009 (PS2)
- Manga

Clear Itsuka Tatta Ano Oka de
- Written by: Moonstone
- Illustrated by: Yukiwo
- Published by: Kadokawa Shoten
- Magazine: Comp Ace
- Original run: August 2007 – July 2008
- Volumes: 2
- Novel

Clear Short Stories
- Written by: Nikaidō Kageyama
- Illustrated by: Hoppege
- Published by: Harvest
- Imprint: Harvest Novels
- Published: March 1, 2008
- Video game

Clear Crystal Stories
- Developer: Moonstone
- Publisher: Moonstone
- Genre: Eroge, Visual novel
- Platform: Windows
- Released: May 3, 2008

Clear (クリア, Kuria) is a Japanese adult visual novel developed by Moonstone which was released on August 24, 2007, for Windows. A PlayStation 2 version, which removes all adult content and adds two additional story routes, was later released on February 19, 2009. The story of Clear follows Kōichi Yukino, a young man who longs for connection and belonging, prompting him to leave the city and return to Harukajima, the island where he was born. There, he discovers more about his past and meets several girls who form deep connections with him.

The gameplay is largely spent reading the dialogue and text that appear on the screen, and the player's choices affect how the plot progresses. There are five main heroines that the player has the choice of romantically pursuing, each with her own story route and ending. Clear was ranked as the third best-selling PC game in Japan at the time of its release. A manga based on the game, drawn by Yukiwo, was serialized in Kadokawa Shoten's Comp Ace. A novel and two drama CDs were also released, as well as a fan disc called Clear Crystal Stories.

== Gameplay ==
An example of gameplay in Clear, showing the protagonist conversing with Miki.

Clear is a romance visual novel in which the player assumes the role of the protagonist, Kōichi Yukino. The majority of the game is spent reading dialogue and the inner thoughts of the protagonist, which appears as text on the screen. The text is accompanied by character sprites over background art, representing the character the player is talking to. Every so often, the player will come to a "decision point" where they will be presented with multiple options that appear on screen; the player's choice at these points will affect the plot progression and the ending they receive.

There are five main story routes and endings—one for each heroine—and one bad ending. After completing a given heroine's route, a playable afterstory for that heroine can be selected from the game's menu. Once all routes are cleared, an additional epilogue is unlocked, which can also be accessed from the menu. There are instances throughout the game where the player will encounter CG artwork taking the place of character sprites and background art; the Windows version of the game includes CGs depicting sexual intercourse. The PlayStation 2 version adds two new story routes for Hisame Arima and Yuzuru Kisaki.

== Plot ==
=== Setting and story ===
The primary setting of the story is Harukajima (春賀島), a small rural island off the coast of mainland Japan, known for its vivid natural scenery, beaches, and old infrastructure. The island is connected to the mainland by a truss railway bridge, and some bus services also travel between the two. Harukajima's main form of local transportation is the tram operated by Harukajima Electric Railway (春賀島電鉄, Harukajima Dentetsu). It is often referred to as the "Spring Train" (春電, Haru-den) by island residents. The only school on Harukajima is Kotogaoka Academy (琴が丘学園, Kotogaoka Gakuen), a large institution with grand Western-style architecture attended by the protagonist and heroines. Kotogaoka Academy is divided into three sections—for elementary, junior high, and high school students—and the tram line runs all the way up to the school gates. Other frequented locations on the island include Ebisu Shrine (蛭子神社, Ebisu Jinja)—the shrine near the peak of the mountain where Haruno and Hisame work—the cliff behind the shrine that overlooks the sea, and the only shopping district on the island, Nakasu Shopping District (中洲商店街, Nakasu Shōtengai).

The story of Clear is told from the perspective of the protagonist, Kōichi Yukino, a young man who struggles with a deep loneliness due to being different from everyone around him. Hoping to find a place where he truly belongs, he leaves the city behind and returns to the island where he was born and raised: Harukajima. Although the island feels familiar to him, his memories of growing up there remain hazy. Upon arriving, he is reunited with his childhood friend, Miki Tsukimura, and moves in with his grandfather, Kangetsu. Shortly afterward, his younger stepsister, Natsuki Yukino, unexpectedly shows up, having followed him to the island. The two enroll at Kotogaoka Academy as high school students. As Kōichi adjusts to life on Harukajima, he meets several other girls with whom he begins to form meaningful connections, and gradually starts to piece together his mysterious past.

=== Main characters ===
The protagonist of Clear is Kōichi Yukino (行野 光一, Yukino Kōichi), a cynical and lazy young man who feels alienated from everyone around him, knowing he is different from normal people. Missing many of his memories and emotions, he finds it difficult to understand and connect with others. Kōichi is not an ordinary human—he is, in fact, a type of bloodsucking vampire. When Kōichi moves to Harukajima, he is followed by his caring younger stepsister, Natsuki Yukino (行野 無月, Yukino Natsuki; voiced by Saki Minase), the first heroine of the game. Though actually his cousin, she was adopted by the Yukino family after her parents died. Viewing herself as her older brother's "guardian", she took on all the housework and cared for him while they lived with Kōichi's father in the city. She is shy and quiet around most people but shows her more lively side when she's with Kōichi. Both she and Kōichi are members of the swimming club at Kotogaoka Academy.

The second heroine, Kōichi's childhood friend Miki Tsukimura (月村 美姫, Tsukimura Miki; voiced by Sakiko Mimura), is overjoyed to reunite with him upon his return to Harukajima. Miki has a graceful and gentle disposition and is popular at school for both her good grades and beautiful appearance. As a member of the volunteer club, she is also well-liked by the townspeople for her engagement with the community. Miki has harbored romantic feelings for Kōichi since they were children. Another heroine, Nonoka Okamoto (岡本 ののか, Okamoto Nonoka; voiced by Marina Ōno), is a clumsy and absentminded maid who works at the Yukino residence. Like the others, she also attends Kotogaoka Academy. She suffers from amnesia and has no memory of her past, which led to her being taken in by Kangetsu and brought to live in the Yukino household. She is affectionately nicknamed "Nono-chan".

The fourth heroine is Haruno Motomachi (本町 春乃, Motomachi Haruno; voiced by Karen Kusano), a high-spirited girl with a positive attitude who also attends Kotogaoka Academy. She works part-time as an apprentice shrine maiden at Ebisu Shrine, assisting Hisame, the chief priest's daughter, in exorcising ghosts and spirits. The reason she became a shrine maiden is because spirits are drawn to Haruno and often possess her. The fourth and final heroine is Sayu Miyagino (宮城野 紗由, Miyagino Sayu; voiced by Soyogi Tōno), a cheerful girl often mistaken for being much younger due to her short stature and childlike demeanor. She always carries a doll named Sayurin (さゆりん) with her, through which she communicates using ventriloquism. Sayu is a member of the volunteer club alongside Miki, who she is good friends with.

== Development and release ==
Clear is the fifth title developed by Moonstone. Planning for the game began in spring of 2005, during the production of Moonstone's previous visual novel Gift, while scriptwriting started in February 2006. Since Gift was viewed as a more "moe-type story", it was decided that Clear would take on a more serious tone, though not to the point of becoming overly heavy. The title Clear was chosen to reflect the "transparent wall" that the protagonist feels between him and other people, symbolizing his feelings of alienation. The production of Clear was overseen by Hotaru Koizumi, while planning was led by Kure who was also in charge of writing the scenario for the game. Kure stated that he was conscious of how bishōjo game protagonists tend to be bland and lacking in individuality, so he focused on creating a protagonist with a strong personality for Clear. The game's artwork was handled by four artists: Mitha, Mamoru Naruse, Mīko Inagaki, and Endori. Mitha and Inagaki had previously worked on Gift, while Naruse was brought on after his dōjinshi caught the attention of staff. Mitha was responsible for designing the main characters, while Endori handled the sub-character designs. Additionally, four people were in charge of computer graphics—Kayaka, Udonko, Yamakaze, and Nao Hinata—while background art was provided by Sazanka. Finally, the game's music was composed by musical group Angel Note.

Clear was first released as an adult game for Windows as a single DVD-ROM on August 24, 2007, in both limited and regular editions—the limited edition came bundled with a metal clock featuring the character Miki, an illustration booklet, and an original soundtrack CD. A PlayStation 2 port, under the title Clear: Atarashī Kaze no Fuku Oka de (Clear 〜新しい風の吹く丘で〜; Clear ~On the Hill Where a New Wind Blows~), was released by Sweets on February 19, 2009. The port removes all adult content and adds new voice acting, event CGs, and two additional story routes for Hisame Arima and Yuzuru Kisaki—Hisame was a supporting character promoted to a heroine, while Yuzuru is an original heroine introduced in the PS2 version. The scenarios for Hisame and Yuzuru were written by Kyō Kobayashi. The port also includes an updated UI system. The PS2 version was released in limited and regular editions; the limited edition included a setting material collection, a newly drawn comic, and a character voice CD. A downloadable version of Clear became available on March 18, 2011.

=== Fan disc ===
Moonstone began planning for a fan disc immediately after development for the main game had finished. The fan disc, titled Clear Crystal Stories, was released for Windows in DVD-ROM format at the Dream Party spring events—first in Tokyo on May 3, and later in Osaka on May 18, 2008. The game was also purchasable through mail order from the official website. Crystal Stories contains a story route for Nen—a minor character from Clear—and an afterstory for each of Clear's five heroines. The scenario for the fan disc was written by Kyō Kobayashi and Himawari Neko. The game became available for download on August 7, 2009.

== Related media ==
=== Print ===
A manga adaptation based on the game, titled Clear Itsuka Tatta Ano Oka de (Clear いつか立ったあの丘で―; Clear On That Hill Where I Once Stood), was serialized in Kadokawa Shoten's Comp Ace magazine between the August 2007 and July 2008 issues. The manga was illustrated by Yukiwo and Torino Kotobuki assisted with writing the story. The first tankōbon volume was published by Kadokawa Shoten under the Kadokawa Comics Ace imprint on March 26, 2008, and the second volume was published on June 26, 2008. A one-shot manga drawn by Yukiwo was published in the March 2009 issue of Comp Ace, based on the PlayStation 2 version of the game. A 222-page novel, titled Clear Short Stories, was published by Harvest under the Harvest Novels imprint on March 1, 2008. It was written by Nikaidō Kageyama and illustrated by Hoppege.

Before the game's release, a 32-page magazine book titled Clear: Prelude Book was published by Media Village on July 28, 2007. The book included character introductions, staff comments, trading cards, and a CD-ROM containing various movies, wallpapers, and an audio drama. A 144-page visual fan book was published by Ichijinsha under the DNA Media Books imprint on April 28, 2008. The visual fan book contained character and story introductions, graphics from the game, illustrations, rough sketches, and staff interviews. A drama CD and poster were also included in the book's appendix.

=== Music and audio CDs ===
The game's opening theme is "Garasu no Loneliness" (硝子のLoneliness, Glass Loneliness), sung by Riryka. The game has two ending themes: "Crystal Love" sung by Kazco, and "Brilliant Days" by Riryka. There are also three insert songs: "Bitter sweet pain" by Haruka Shimotsuki, "Eternal" (エターナル, Etānaru) by Rekka Katakiri, and "One-way Shining" by Chata. An image song titled "Perfect tears", performed by Riryka, was used in promotional movies for the game. The opening theme for the PlayStation 2 version is "Frozen Tear" by Ceui.

A CD single for "Perfect tears" was released by Lantis on May 23, 2007. The single included the image song, a remix of the game's opening theme, and instrumental versions of both tracks. The game's original soundtrack came bundled with the limited-edition release on August 24, 2007, and included two discs along with a bonus drama track. A vocal album titled Clear vocal mini album was released on September 26, 2007, by Lantis containing the opening theme, both ending themes, and the three insert songs featured in the game. A drama CD, titled Doki! Onna Darake no Onsen Ryokō (ドキッ☆女だらけの温泉旅行, Ba-dump!☆A Hot Spring Trip Filled with Girls), was distributed for free at the 2007 Dream Party spring events in Osaka and Tokyo. Another drama CD was released by Lantis on May 9, 2008, containing fourteen drama tracks.

== Reception ==
In July 2007, the limited-edition version of Clear ranked third in national PC game pre-orders in Japan. It went on to place third in PC game sales for August and appeared once more in the rankings in the following month, at 47th. On Getchu.com, a major redistributor of visual novel and domestic anime products, Clear was the third best-selling game in August 2007 and ranked 23rd overall for the year. Its fan disc, Clear Crystal Stories, later placed fifth in Getchu.com's sales rankings for May 2008. As of December 21, 2009, the PlayStation 2 version of Clear had sold 6,315 copies.

In Getchu.com's 2007 Bishōjo Game Ranking, users cast votes for the best games in the following categories: overall, scenario, theme song, music, visuals, system, and heroines. Clear ranked 20th overall, 11th in the theme song category, and 17th for music, but did not place in any of the remaining categories. In a collection of game song reviews titled "The Ultimate 50 Game Songs - Part 2", published in Yōsensha's AniSong Magazine, writer Ryūichi Sumikawa described Clear's opening theme, "Garasu no Loneliness", as a trance-like song and praised Riryka's "evergreen vocals".
