= Gift (2005 video game) =

2005 Japanese adult visual novel

- Gift original visual novel cover

ギフト (Gifuto)
- Video game
- Developer: Moonstone
- Publisher: Moonstone (PC); Sweets (PS2); Mtrix (iPhone); Cyberfront (PSP)
- Genre: Eroge, visual novel
- Platform: Windows, PS2, iOS, PSP
- Released: JP: May 27, 2005 (PC); JP: October 19, 2006 (PS2); JP: April 16, 2009 (iOS); JP: February 2, 2012 (PSP)
- Light novel
- Written by: Mako Komao
- Illustrated by: Mugi Komeda; Mitha; Koma Miyama; Mamoru Naruse
- Published by: Harvest
- Original run: December 25, 2005 – May 1, 2006
- Volumes: 5
- Manga

Gift: Under the Rainbow
- Written by: Yukiwo
- Published by: Kadokawa Shoten
- Magazine: Comptiq
- Original run: January 10, 2006 – February 10, 2007
- Volumes: 2
- Video game

Gift Rainbow-colored Stories
- Developer: Moonstone
- Publisher: Moonstone
- Genre: Eroge, visual novel
- Platform: Windows
- Released: JP: January 26, 2006 (PC)
- Anime television series

Gift: Eternal Rainbow
- Directed by: Shigeru Kimiya
- Produced by: Oshi Yoshinuma; Ryuutarou Kawakami; Yoshiyuki Itou
- Written by: Masashi Suzuki
- Music by: Masumi Itō
- Studio: OLM Team Iwasa
- Original network: Tokyo MX TV, KBS, TVK, GTV, AT-X, TVN, BS Asahi, SBC, RKK, Fukui TV
- Original run: October 6, 2006 – December 22, 2006
- Episodes: 12
- Light novel

Gift Prism: Over the Rainbow
- Written by: Hiroshi Sukeno
- Illustrated by: Mitha; Yukiwo
- Published by: Kadokawa Shoten
- Published: November 7, 2006
- Original video animation

Gift: Eternal Rainbow
- Directed by: Shigeru Kimiya
- Studio: OLM Team Iwasa
- Released: June 22, 2007
- Runtime: 24 minutes

Gift (ギフト, Gifuto) is a Japanese adult visual novel developed by Moonstone and released on May 27, 2005, for Windows. The original game was a collaboration project where the company Circus helped to produce it, though Moonstone did the majority of the work involved. Gift is Moonstone's fourth title, and was followed up with an adult fan disc called Gift Rainbow-colored Stories released on January 27, 2006, for Windows. It was later ported to the PlayStation 2 and PlayStation Portable. The gameplay in Gift follows a plot line which offers pre-determined scenarios with courses of interaction, and focuses on the appeal of the five female main characters. The story revolves around Haruhiko Amami, a male high school student living in a town where a rainbow is always seen in the sky.

The game premiered as the second best-selling PC game sold in Japan for the time of its release, and charted in the national top 50 three more times afterwards. A set of five drama CDs, one for each heroine, was released by Lantis between September 2005 and February 2006. There have been six light novels written, a five-chapter illustrated story series that serialized in the Dengeki Hime magazine, two Internet radio shows produced, along with a manga series serialized in Kadokawa Shoten's seinen magazine Comptiq between January 2006 and February 2007. A 12-episode anime adaptation, produced by Oriental Light and Magic, aired in Japan between October and December 2006.

== Gameplay ==
The gameplay requires little interaction from the player as most of the duration of the game is spent on simply reading the text that will appear on the screen; this text represents either dialogue between the various characters, or the inner thoughts of the protagonist. Every so often, the player will come to a "decision point" where he or she is given the chance to choose from options that are displayed on the screen, typically two to three at a time. During these times, gameplay pauses until a choice is made that furthers the plot in a specific direction, depending on which choice the player makes.

There are five main plot lines that the player will have the chance to experience, one for each of the heroines in the story. In order to view the five plot lines to their entirety, the player will have to replay the game multiple times and choose different choices during the decision points in order to further the plot in an alternate direction.

== Plot ==
Gift is a story that revolves around high school student Haruhiko Amami and his strong connection to Gift's mysterious power. The town of Narasakicho, where Gift's story takes place, has two distinguishing characteristics: a rainbow that seems permanently fixed in the sky no matter the weather, and an ability known as Gift possessed by all its inhabitants. Gift's power can only be evoked by each person once in a lifetime, and is able to grant a single miracle. To be successful, a Gift must reflect the shared feelings of both the giver and the receiver. If the feelings are not mutual, the Gift is distorted and has the ability to wreak havoc on the surrounding area. When this happens, a black streak appears in the rainbow above town until Gift is used correctly. The story begins as Haruhiko's younger sister, Riko Fukimine, returns home after several years away. Beginning with her appearance, Haruhiko's life starts to change very quickly and feelings of the past begin to surface once more.

== Characters ==
The girls of Gift: Chisa (top-left), Rinka (top-center), Yukari (top-right), Kirino (bottom-left), and Riko (bottom-right).

=== Main characters ===
Haruhiko Amami (天海 春彦, Amami Haruhiko)
Voiced by: Takuo Kawamura (PC), Yūki Tai (PS2/anime)
Haruhiko, a second-year student at Shimano Gakuen, is the main protagonist of Gift. He is a childhood friend of Kirino and the older brother of Riko, though they are not related by blood. He tends to be blunt in his mannerisms and likes to tease Kirino constantly. Whenever Gift is concerned, he is adamant that it is a helpful and worthwhile power to possess, for he claims that he owes his own life to it. His mother died many years ago, soon after his birth. It was then revealed that Gift was in fact created on the same day he was born by his mother Haru Amami before she died. But because Gift can only be sent or received once in a person's lifetime, in order for both Riko and Kirino's Gift be removed, he has to remove the source Gift itself which is embodied by the everlasting rainbow in the sky. But as a result, he also lost his life for a while before Riko found him.

Riko Fukamine (深峰 莉子, Fukamine Riko)
Voiced by: Rino Sakura (PC), Ai Shimizu (PS2/anime)
Riko is Haruhiko's younger sister in name, although they are the same age and are in the same class together in school after she enrolls. In third grade, she joined Haruhiko's family due to family circumstances and Haruhiko immediately treated her as if she really were his little sister. When they were younger, she left for several years, only to appear again one day out of the blue years later. The reason she returned was to be with Haruhiko as he is her first love and has continued to be in love with him. She is currently a second-year at Shimano Gakuen and shares the same class as Haruhiko.

Kirino Konosaka (木之坂 霧乃, Konosaka Kirino)
Voiced by: Yui Sakakibara (PC), Ui Miyazaki (PS2/anime)
Kirino is Haruhiko's childhood friend and next door neighbor. They are such good friends that she often comes over to his house in the mornings before school to not only wake him up, but also to make him breakfast. She tends to be the unfortunate receiver of much of Haruhiko's teasing due to her timid nature, though she does not mind it much, as she is in love with Haruhiko. She is one year younger than Haruhiko and is a first-year student at Shimano Gakuen.

Rinka Hokazono (外薗 綸花, Hokazono Rinka)
Voiced by: Rina Misaki (PC), Shiho Kawaragi (PS2/anime)
Rinka is a very tough but beautiful girl who is able to defend herself without even breaking a sweat. She is a master at the Ousō style of swordsmanship and was even a teacher of the kendo club in junior high school. She has a series of special training devices near the gym which are dangerous to nearly anyone except for her. She has an older sister who has died years ago. Unknown to most people, she has a liking for Shoujo Manga. She is a first-year student at Shimano Gakuen.

Chisa Fujimiya (藤宮 千紗, Fujimiya Chisa)
Voiced by: Ayaka Kimura (PC), Ryoko Shintani (PS2/anime)
Chisa is Kirino's best friend. Her father is the founder of Fujimiya Corporation so she is considered a businessman's daughter and raised as a princess. She is on good terms with Rinka. Unknown to everyone, though, she is in fact a witch that often flies around town on her broomstick. She has a small crow familiar named Jinta. She seems to be able to respond to Haruhiko's banter about things very well. She is a first-year student at Shimano Gakuen and is Kirino's classmate.

Yukari Kamishiro (神代 縁, Kamishiro Yukari)
Voiced by: Nana Nozaki (PC), Ami Koshimizu (PS2/anime)
Yukari, or "Yukarin" as she is known by her friends, is a third-year student at Shimano Gakuen, and she also works as a maid at the Fujimiya Residence. She acts older than her age and is skilled at treating injuries. She tends to speak with a quiet voice. Her reason that she works there is that she has lost a portion of her past memories, and seems to have an innate ability to talk to animals. Her always likes is to cheer for others in life by saying: "Please do your best."

Masaki Edo (江戸 真紀, Edo Masaki)
Voiced by: Toshiya Aranami (PC), Kazutoshi Hatano (PS2/anime)
Masaki, known as Maki to his friends, is one of Haruhiko's good friends who is obsessed with things having to do with science. He will often invent outrageous devices that eventually go out of control.

Nami Satō (里緒 奈美, Satō Nami)
Voiced by: Oto Agumi (PC), Yukiko Iwai (PS2/anime)
Nami is a girl who has been seen clinging to Rinka ever since Rinka saved her in the past. She is very enthusiastic when it comes to anything concerning Rinka, which often causes her to rave about how amazing Rinka is. She has shown herself to be jealous of others who may seem to be more than just friends with Rinka, which could be because she is in love with her.

=== Gift: Prism additional characters ===
Sena Asakawa (浅川瀬奈, Asakawa Sena)
Voiced by: Atsuko Enomoto (PS2/anime)
Sena is a second-year student in Shimano Gakuen and also is the head of the School's Student Council, who is recommended by the former head. She is the official Idol of Shimano Gakuen whose popularity is comparable to that of Riko's. Sena has a liking for penguins and is obsessed with getting as many of those toys as possible. She is able to collect Gift from every male student in Shimano Gakuen who confesses his feelings to her, but she doesn't go out with any of those guys even once. In addition, this Gift to her is easily obtainable, but it doesn't make her happy even if she has that ability.

Nene Himekura (姫倉寧々, Himekura Nene)
Voiced by: Naoko Matsui (PS2/anime)
Nene is a third-year student in Shimano Gakuen and is a daughter of a wealthy man whose financial ability far exceeds that of the Fujimiya Household. Although she is popular with the first and second-year students in the school, many classmates dislike her for her extremely high-handed nature due to her upbringing. This results in her having no one to call a friend in school. Her father is a successful IT entrepreneur while her mother is a famous celebrity making Nene a real society princess. But she has a bad habit of carrying only credit cards of all sorts and no cash which makes buying in school canteens very difficult. She always replies to anyone who tries to confess their feelings to her: "Call my lawyers first!"

Miyu Akihara (秋原未遊, Akihara Miyu)
Voiced by: Yuka Iguchi (PS2/anime)
Miyu is a second-year student in Shimano Gakuen who is a quiet girl and always carry a book with her. She has a collie dog and seems to always peeping at Haruhiko from the shadows after he has helped her before. Both her parents have died and Miyu herself has been living on royalties paid to her mother's literary works which are mainly romance novels and thus also affected her ambition to become a novelist. She belongs to the literary club at school and loves reading. She is also actively writing stories and posts the works onto her own website.

== Development and release ==
Koizumi Hotaru managed the production of Gift, and Lantis, a Japanese company that specializes in the music industry, also cooperated with production. Characters in the game were designed by the following; Mitha, Koma Miyama, and Misuzu Takano. Gift's art was illustrated by Amerika Tamugi, Yuu Touka, and Karuya Yuka, with the addition of character designers Mitha, Koma, and Misuzu. Shigezo Tsuchiyama handled the programming for Gift, and Kure worked as the scenario planner.

Gift was first introduced to the public in Japan as a limited edition version on May 27, 2005 as a DVD playable on a Microsoft Windows PC. The regular edition was released on June 10, 2005, also as a DVD, and then another version was released on December 16, 2005 as a CD-ROM. A fandisc called Gift Rainbow-colored Stories (ギフト にじいろストーリーズ, Gifuto Nijiiro Sutōrīzu) was released on January 27, 2006 as a CD-ROM. A version for the PlayStation 2 (PS2) with adult content removed, called Gift: Prism, was developed by Sweets and released in Japan on October 19, 2006 in limited and regular editions. This PS2 version has added CGs to replace the adult scenes and also has added three additional heroines that the protagonist can pursue in addition to the original five. The PS2 game was re-released on August 9, 2007 at a lower price. An iOS edition of the PS2 version was released on April 16, 2009. A PlayStation Portable version by CyberFront was released on February 2, 2012.

== Adaptations ==
Gift manga volume 1

=== Print media ===
A five-part illustrated story series was serialized in MediaWorks' Dengeki Hime magazine between the February and June 2005 issues. Each issue focused on a different Gift heroine. A light novel series based on the game comprising five volumes was published by Harvest. Each of the novels covers one of the five heroines starting with Riko, and going through with Kirino, Rinka, Chisa, and Yukari, in that order. The first novel was released on December 25, 2005, and the final novel was released on May 1, 2006. The novels were written by Japanese author Mako Komao, with accompanied illustrations provided by Mugi Komeda, Mitha, Koma Miyama, and Mamoru Naruse. A separate light novel called Gift Prism: Over the Rainbow was written by Hiroshi Sukeno; the novel's front illustration was by Mitha, and Yukiwo worked as the main illustrator. It was published by Kadokawa Shoten on November 7, 2006.

Gift's manga adaptation, illustrated by Yukiwo and titled Gift: Under the Rainbow, was serialized in Kadokawa's seinen Comptiq magazine between January 10, 2006 and February 10, 2007. Two tankōbon volumes were released for the 13 chapters produced. Two art books based on Gift have been published. The first of these was a 39-page long fan book titled Gift First Fan Book, which was published by Broccoli in May 2005. A 111-page art book, titled Gift Artworks was published by MediaWorks on August 1, 2006.

=== Audio CDs and radio shows ===
A vocal mini album was released by Lantis for the visual novel Gift on July 7, 2005, containing eight tracks. Lantis released an original soundtrack for Gift's fan disc Gift Rainbow-colored Stories on January 12, 2006, titled Gift - Niji-Iro Stories 'Seven Color Ribbon', containing 25 tracks. Two albums from the anime were published by Lantis. The first of these is Gift ~eternal rainbow~ Character Song Mini Album, which comprises five different character songs for each of the heroines. An original soundtrack for the anime was released on January 24, 2007, containing 38 tracks.

There are five drama CDs based on the series published by Lantis. Each of the CDs covers one of the five heroines starting with Riko, and going through with Kirino, Chisa, Rinka, and Yukari, in that order. The first CD was released on September 22, 2005, and the final CD was released on February 22, 2006.

Lantis Net Radio has hosted two Gift-related shows: Gift Rainbow Station (aired from October 11, 2005, to May 23, 2006), and Gift Rainbow Homeroom (aired from July 14 to December 29, 2006). The two radio shows feature different on-air personalities.

=== Anime ===
A 12-episode anime television series adaptation, titled Gift: Eternal Rainbow (ギフト〜エターナルレインボー〜, Gifuto 〜Etānaru Reinbō〜), was produced by Oriental Light and Magic and directed by Shigeru Kimiya. It aired in Japan between October 6 and December 22, 2006. The opening theme is "Niji Iro Sentimental" by Miyuki Hashimoto and the ending theme is "Kokoro Niji o Kakete" by Misato Fujiya. Six DVD compilations volumes were released between December 22, 2006, and May 25, 2007, each volume containing two episodes. An extra episode was released as a DVD-exclusive original video animation on June 22, 2007.

==== Episodes ====
No.	Title	Original release date
1	"The Rainbow City"; Transliteration: "Niji ga Yadoru Machi" (Japanese: 虹が宿る街)	October 6, 2006
Haruhiko's childhood friend Kirino had been eagerly awaiting the day that they'd once again be able to attend school together, but a misuse of Gift's mysterious power threatens to ruin the entrance ceremony.
2	"The Little Sister has Returned"; Transliteration: "Kaette Kida Imōto" (Japanese: 帰ってきだ妹)	October 13, 2006
Riko, Haruhiko's younger sister, returns home after several years. Things start to return to the way they once were, but what of Kirino's feelings?
3	"First Love"; Transliteration: "Hatsukoi no Hito" (Japanese: 初恋の人)	October 20, 2006
Haruhiko is getting jealous that other guys are looking Riko's way, but why should he have these feelings if he's only her brother? Does Riko even see him that way?
4	"The Passing Summer"; Transliteration: "Surechigau Natsu" (Japanese: すれ違う夏)	October 27, 2006
On a hot summer day, Maki and the others invite Haruhiko and Riko to the beach. While there, he devises plans to get Haruhiko and Riko back on better terms.
5	"At the Closed Place"; Transliteration: "Tozasareta Basho de" (Japanese: 閉ざされた場所で)	November 3, 2006
Nami won't leave Rinka alone, so Rinka and Haruhiko pretend to be a couple in the hopes that she'll back off. Nami sees through their ruse and unleashes the terrible side of Gift's power.
6	"Appearances"; Transliteration: "Omokage" (Japanese: 面影)	November 10, 2006
Kirino is having misgivings about Haruhiko and Riko finally making up. As an unintended consequence of a witch's fake Gift, Haruhiko begins to see Riko as his late mother.
7	"The Meaning of Happiness"; Transliteration: "Shiawase no Imi" (Japanese: 幸せの意味)	November 17, 2006
Haruhiko finds the witch responsible for the fake Gifts and discovers that she is, in fact, Chisa. In order to see Riko as herself again, Haruhiko is prepared to sacrifice some very important memories... and even the rainbow itself.
8	"Time of Memories"; Transliteration: "Omoide no Jikan" (Japanese: 思い出の時間)	November 24, 2006
While on a school trip in Kyoto with Riko and the others in his class, Haruhiko finds himself unable to buy the love charm Kirino had requested, because his feelings lie elsewhere.
9	"Linked Hearts, Broken Feelings"; Transliteration: "Tsunagaru Kokoro, Togireta Omoi" (Japanese: つながる心、途切れた想い)	December 1, 2006
Upon returning from the trip, Haruhiko admits to Kirino that he can't return her feelings. She later accuses Riko of breaking an important childhood promise.
10	"A Past Taken Away"; Transliteration: "Ubawareta Kako" (Japanese: 奪われた過去)	December 8, 2006
With Riko begging for forgiveness, an emotionally broken Kirino has Riko give up her past with Haruhiko so she can stay with him from now on. Haruhiko is then forced to come to terms with his own severed past with Kirino.
11	"The Secret of Gift"; Transliteration: "Gift no Himitsu" (Japanese: Giftの秘密)	December 15, 2006
Haruhiko struggles to come to terms with Gift's true power and how he can protect the one he loves, which leads him back to the very first Gift: a parting farewell from his dying mother.
12	"The Eternal Rainbow"; Transliteration: "Eien no Niji" (Japanese: 永遠の虹)	December 22, 2006
With Riko's memories restored, Haruhiko sets about repairing his broken friendship with Kirino. Though Gift's power is gone, and the Eternal Rainbow along with it, Haruhiko and Riko vow to see the rainbow together again.
OVA	"Critical Moment at the Konosaka Inn"; Transliteration: "Konosaka Ryokan Kikiippatsu" (Japanese: 木之坂旅館 危機一髪)	June 22, 2007
Kirino's family runs a Japanese inn, and her friends from school are helping out. Business has been slow due to a large hotel being opened up close by, and Haruhiko gets the idea to clean up the inn so that new customers may come in. During this time, Chisa, Rinka, and Yukari start acting strange whenever around Haruhiko.

== Reception ==
According to a national sales ranking of bishōjo games sold in Japan, the PC release of Gift premiered at No. 2 during the second half of May 2005. Gift charted further in the rankings, ranking No. 9 in the first half of June, No. 34 in the second half, and lastly, No. 44 in the first half of July. On Getchu.com, a major redistributor of visual novel and domestic anime products, Gift ranked No. 2 in PC sales in Japan for May 2005, the month and year of its release, only falling behind the visual novel Princess Witches, which ranked first. In the following month June, the ranking fell to No. 11. In the entirety of 2005 on Getchu.com, Gift ranked No. 32. The fan disc Gift Rainbow-colored Stories, ranked first in January 2006, the month and year of its release, on Getchu.com. In the following month, the ranking fell to No. 13. For the first half of 2006, Gift Rainbow-colored Stories ranked No. 12 on Getchu.com.
