= Regista =

Japanese visual novel publishing company

- Company type: Limited company
- Industry: Computer games
- Founded: 2001
- Headquarters: Japan
- Products: Visual novels
- Website: regista.co.jp

Regista (レジスタ, Rejisuta) is a Japanese visual novel publishing company founded in 2001 by Takumi Nakazawa. The company name comes from an Italian word meaning film director, control tower, producer, and game maker. The company mainly ports adult game to the consumer port PlayStation 2. In 2006, Regista published their first original game named I/O by GN Software, and in 2007 published their second original game called Myself ; Yourself by Yeti.

== Games published ==
- Aria the Natural: Tōi Kioku no Mirage
- H_{2}O +
- I/O
- I"s Pure
- Izumo 2: Gakuen Kyōsōkyoku Double Baton
- Koihime † Musō
- Con Neko: Keep a Memory Green
- Life Like an hour
- Myself ; Yourself
- Root Double: Before Crime * After Days
- Saint Beast: Rasen no Shō
- School Days L×H
- Secret Game: Killer Queen
- Sekai no Subete: Two of Us
- Sharin no Kuni, Himawari no Shōjo
- Tamayura: Mitama Okuri no Uta
- Teikoku Sen Senki
