= FairChild =

Japanese visual novel

- FairChild official visual novel cover

FairChild -フェアチャイルド (Feachairudo)
- Genre: Romance, Drama
- Manga

FairChild - Heartful Mail
- Written by: ALcot
- Illustrated by: Nimura Yuuji
- Published by: ALcot; Enterbrain
- Magazine: Tech Gian
- Original run: April 2007 – September 2007
- Video game

Touch! FairChild Heroines
- Developer: ALcot
- Publisher: ALcot
- Genre: Browser game
- Platform: Windows
- Manga

FairChild - Favorite Dishes
- Written by: ALcot
- Illustrated by: Nimura Yuuji
- Published by: ALcot; Enterbrain
- Magazine: Tech Gian
- Original run: November 2007 – March 2008
- Video game
- Developer: ALcot
- Publisher: ALcot
- Genre: Eroge, Visual novel
- Platform: Windows
- Released: JP: December 14, 2007
- Other
- ALcot Classic Works 2013

FairChild (FairChild -フェアチャイルド, Feachairudo) is a romance visual novel released in Japan, developed and published by ALcot. ALcot has also produced such visual novels as My Girlfriend is the President, and Clover Heart's. The game was officially released on December 14, 2007, playable on Windows as a DVD ROM. The gameplay of FairChild offers branching plot lines and a multi choice navigation, where multiple paths and endings are available for completion. The game consists of six chapters, the first being the prologue chapter, and the rest featuring one of the five heroines. FairChild is an 18 prohibited game, due to the sexual content.

A prelude book and visual fan book for FairChild have been published, as have online two online webcomics, which serialized in Enterbrain's Tech Gian magazine. Several FairChild audio CDs have also been produced. Magome Togoshi composed the music for FairChild. On the official website of FairChild, a flash game was published by ALcot, called Touch! FairChild Heroines.

== Gameplay ==
What a typical conversation in FairChild looks like. Here, Kazuki is conversing with Kotori.

In FairChild, the player assumes the role of Takanashi Kazuki, who is the main protagonist of the game. Much of the gameplay is spent reading the Kazuki's narrative. Kazuki interacts with other characters by dialogue, which can be read in the text box near the bottom of the screen. The game's interface includes a backlog, auto mode and text skip. The player will often encounter decision points, where they must select one of the choices in order to further the plot in a specific direction.

The protagonist may end up with one of the five heroines, Kotori, Tobari, Yuuhi, Kokoro and Sakuya. However, depending on the decisions they make in the game, or from not attain enough affection from one of the heroines, they could also receive the "bad ending", where the protagonist ends up with Kotori's younger sister, Aine. Along with choices, the player will also have to select a heroine from the map select screen, and as a heroine's affection rises, more hearts will be increasingly displayed near the heroine, ultimately ending with a large heart with wings. Extra menus can be obtained, such as CG, music, H scene and bonus H scenarios, but only after the player meets the mystery man, who appears on the map as a question mark. Each time a heroine's route has been completed, new features will be added to the opening screen, such as CGs, and new instruments to the opening screen music, additionally, feathers appear on the screen when you have finished the game.

== Plot ==
The main protagonist of Fairchild is Takanashi Kazuki, a boy whose parents died when he was young, and despite the tragedy, in the present time, he lives an enjoyable, peaceful life in his aunt's house, with his childish, energetic cousin Hazumi Kotori and his sweet, gullible next-door neighbor and friend Hinamori Kokoro. Kazuki wants to live this life forever, however, nothing lasts forever. To gain something means to lose something. He and the people around him are all growing up into adults. The game's primary focuses are friendship, family conflict, and romance. Other heroines in the game other than Kotori and Kokoro include Aizara Tobari, the teasing childhood friend of Kazuki, Arisugawa Yuuhi, Kazuki's cold classmate, and Kagami Sakuya, Kazuki's senpai who is the student council president.

== Characters ==
=== Protagonists ===
Takanashi Kazuki (たかなし かずき, Kazuki Takanashi)
Takanashi is the main protagonist of the game. When he was little, his parents died so he lives with his aunt and cousin, Kotori.

=== Heroines ===
Hazumi Kotori (はずみ ことり, Kotori Hazumi)
Voiced by: Yui Sakakibara
Kotori is the cousin of Takanashi, who is very loving but energetic, consequently bad at studying, though she tries hard at it. She also has a very big imagination, and tends to fantasize often. Kotori loves to glomp Kazuki from behind.

Aizara Tobari (あいざわ とばり, Tobari Aizara)
Voiced by: Mia Naruse
Tobari is Kazuki's childhood friend, she comes from a prestigious family. Her goal is to be a neo-Nadeshiko. She loves feeling up the other girls. She is also the sole member of the tea ceremony club.

Hinamori Kokoro (ひなもり こころ, Kokoro Hinamori)
Voiced by: Agu Mion
Kokoro is Kazuki's next-door neighbor, her window is across from Kazuki's. She has a very innocent and sweet nature, and is quite gullible, despite being one year older than Kazuki.

Arisugawa Yuuhi (ありすがわ ゆうひ, Yuuhi Arisugawa)
Voiced by: Soyogi Tono
Yuuhi is Kazuki's classmate who sits beside him in class. She recently came back from America to Japan. She has a cool attitude and is hard to approach.

Kagami Sakuya (かがみ さくや, Sakuya Kagami)
Voiced by: Samoto Nirin
Sakuya is the student council president of Kazuki's school. She is also in the top grade.

== Development and release ==
The project manager for FairChild was Kawahara Tatsumi, Miyazō Tokino and Sora Shimomoto worked on the game's scenario. The illustrations for the game were handled by Nimura Yūji and Aona Masao. Magome Togoshi, Manack, and MANYO provided the music for FairChild. The movie making was produced by Pachira. ALcot officially released the game in Japan on December 14, 2007, as a DVD ROM, playable on the platform Microsoft Windows for the PC. Each chapter of the game was released separately as a trial before the FairChild's official release. All of the heroine chapters were released in November, whereas the prologue chapter was released on October 27, 2007, as trial edition. All of the releases, including the trials, are age rated 18+, as FairChild is an eroge game. In December, soon before the release of the complete edition, the prelude book was published, containing guides and more. On September 27, 2013, FairChild was released as a part of ALcot Classic Works 2013, and still maintains the age rating 18+. Other games which were also released part of ALcot Class Works 2013 include Clover Heart's, Engage Links, Natsupochi, and Triptych.

== Media ==
=== Printed media ===
Before the release of the visual novel of FairChild, a mini webcomic called FairChild - Heartful Mail was published on ALcot's official website, and was serialized in Enterbrain's Tech Gian magazine from April to September, in 2007. There are five pages, each featuring a different heroine. Another webcomic has also been published on ALcot's official site, called FairChild - Favorite Dishes, which serialized in the Tech Gian magazine from November 2007 to March 2008. Alike FairChild - Heartful Mail, the webcomic consists of five pages, each featuring one of the five heroines.

On December 1, 2007, a prelude book for FairChild was published by Media Village. The book contains character introductions, story guides, and staff interviews. Ichijinsha published a visual fan book, on April 23, 2008. The visual fan book consists of game CGs, illustrations, and includes a short comic and short story titled "Kimi ga Kureta Shiawase". The book is 127 pages long.

=== Music and audio CDs ===
The opening theme is "FairChild", sung by Yui Sakakibara, who is Kotori's voice actor in the game. The ending theme is "Hare no Chikumori", which is also sung by Yui. FairChild has two image songs, "Twinkle Love", by YURIA, and "Purest Days", by Marie. On December 14, 2007, an audio CD labelled "FairChild Arrange Soundtrack" was published by ALcot. It contains the five heroine themes, "Sun-Spot Birdsong", "A Lady Without Virtue", "Melancholic Lady at the Window", "Flowers and Pâtissière", and "Innocent Kitty", and other BGMs. Another audio CD was published by Music Boat, and distributed by Ardeur, called "FairChild GM Original Soundtrack", containing two discs. There was a pre-release for the CD at Comiket 73 on December 29, 2007. ALcot also produced a CD for the image song Purest Days, which also comprises the instrumental version. The CD was released on December 14, 2007, the same day as the arranged soundtrack. On October 14, 2007, "FairChild Maxi Single" was commercially released as a vocal CD by ALcot. Lastly, a CD called "FairChild Theme Song Short Version Collection" was produced, on the same day as the arranged soundtrack and Maxi Single, by ALcot. The CD contains different versions of the theme song, each heroine has their own version.

=== Browser game ===
On FairChild's official website, there is a flash game called Touch! FairChild Heroines (Touch! フェアチャヒロインズ, Touch! Feachahiroinzu), where the player can sexually interact with all five heroines (at a time). 'The game does not include any H-scenes. The gameplay in Touch! FairChild Heroines is very simple, the player may select one of the actions on the left (in Japanese), and the particular heroine reacts to each one differently. There is a textbox on the bottom of the screen that reads the heroine's dialogue, which is also in Japanese. The game and system is laid out almost identically to the visual novel itself.

== Reception ==
On Getchu, a major redistributor of visual novel and domestic anime products, FairChild was ranked ninth in the PC sales ranking for December 2007.
