= World Love (disambiguation) =

World Love is an album by Canadian singer Lisa Lougheed.

World Love may also refer to:

- "World Love," a song by the Magnetic Fields from their 1999 album 69 Love Songs
- W.L.O. Sekai Renai Kikō, or World Love Organization, a Japanese adult visual novel

== See also ==
- A World of Love, a 1955 novel by Elizabeth Bowen
- A World of Love, 1975 Argentine film
- Zamaana Deewana (lit. 'World Love'), a 1995 Indian Hindi-language film
