= Nakazawa =

Nakazawa (written: 中澤, 中沢, 仲澤 or 仲沢) is a Japanese surname. Notable people with the surname include:

- Ayumu Nakazawa, Japanese voice actor
- Daisuke Nakazawa, sushi chef
- Kazuto Nakazawa (born 1968), Japanese animator
- Kei Nakazawa (born 1959), Japanese writer and professor
- Keiji Nakazawa (born 1939), Japanese manga artist and writer
- Kyle Nakazawa (born 1988), Japanese-American football player
- Masatomo Nakazawa (中澤 匡智; born 1983), Japanese actor, voice actor and singer
- Masatsugu Nakazawa (中澤 公胤; born 1975), Japanese professional wrestler known as Michael Nakazawa
- Motoki Nakazawa (中沢 元紀; born 2000), Japanese actor
- Sae Nakazawa (born 1983), Japanese judoka
- Takumi Nakazawa (born 1976), Japanese video game writer
- Tomohide Nakazawa (中澤 友秀; born 1980), Japanese footballer
- Yuji Nakazawa (born 1978), Japanese football player
- Yuko Nakazawa (born 1973), Japanese J-pop singer
- Christoph Nakazawa (born 1989), video game developer
