= Hyo-sei =

Japanese voice actress and singer

- 氷青
- Born: Kumiko Yokote (横手 久美子); April 21, 1973 (age 53); Chiba Prefecture, Japan
- Occupations: Voice actress; singer
- Agent: Power Rise

Kumiko Yokote (横手 久美子, Yokote Kumiko; born April 21, 1973 in Chiba) is a Japanese voice actress and singer who works for Power Rise under the alias Hyo-sei (氷青, Hyōsei). For adult works, she goes by the name Elena Kaibara (海原 エレナ, Kaibara Erena). Hyo-sei released her first album titled Fuyu Hanabi (冬花火) on April 21, 2010.

== Early life and career ==
Graduated from Nihon University College of Art and Drama after graduating from Nihon University Learning Shino High School. After graduating from the Tokyo Media Academy Voice Actor Vocal Department (currently Tokyo Voice Actor Academy Voice Actor Training Department), she joined Ken Production and stayed at the company until June 30, 2013. After a free period, she moved to the Toritori Office in August of the same year. In June 2015, the company moved to the current office following the start of the company's merger with Trias.

With the start of activities as a singer in the spring of 2004, she changed her artistic name to Hyo-sei. Until then, she was active as Kumiko Yokote, her real name. Since 2009, she has been active as a vocalist for the milleluci unit based on Showa Kayo / Bossa Nova, and since 2016 the band's name has changed to Sen no Akashi.

== Filmography ==
=== Anime ===
- Digimon Frontier (Tsunomon)
- Elemental Gelade (Partin "Parl" Cels)
- Futari wa Pretty Cure Splash Star (Shinohara-sensei)
- Gift (Haruhiko's mother)
- Imouto Bitch ni Shiboraretai as Mina (2017)
- Kamisama Kiss (Narukami)
- Kimi ga Aruji de Shitsuji ga Ore de (Venis)
- Koihime Musou (Teiiku)
- Lucifer and the Biscuit Hammer (Shea Moon)
- Magical Girl Lyrical Nanoha (Noel K. Ehrlichkeit)
- Megachu! (Jordh)
- Rockman EXE (Miyuki Kuroi)
- Ojamajo Doremi (Tetsuya Kotake)
- Pokémon Advanced Generation (Nagi)
- Petite Cossette (Hatsumi Mataki)
- Raimuiro Senkitan (Sophia)
- Sasami: Mahou Shōjo Club (Mihoshi-sensei)
- Sexfriend (Taeko Nonomiya)
- Super Mario (Princess Peach)
- Shin Seiki Inma Seiden (Ootori Kaori)
- Shoujo Sect (Sayuri Ookami)
- Shugo Chara! (Eru)
- Shugo Chara!!Doki— (Eru)
- Shugo Chara!!Doki Dokki! (Eru)
- Sister Princess (Shirayuki)
- Strawberry Panic! (Shion Toumori)
- Tatsunoko Fight (Neon)
- Tottoko Hamtaro (Sae-san)
- Yoake Mae Yori Ruri Iro Na (Natsuki Takamizawa)
- Yokorenbo: Immoral Mother (Junko Fujisaki)
- Zero Sum Game (Yuuka Tokano)

=== Video games ===
- 11eyes: Tsumi to Batsu to Aganai no Shōjo (Kusakabe Misao and Superbia)
- 77 ~And, two stars meet again~ (Karen Lux Victoria)
- Action Taimanin (Oboro)
- Arknights (Indigo)
- Azur Lane (KMS Regensburg)
- Blue Archive (Itagaki Kanoe)
- Cotton 2: Magical Night Dreams (Appli ke Pumpkin)
- G Senjō no Maō (Mizuha Shiratori)
- Kourin no Machi, Lavender no Shoujo (Kamiyama Reika)
- Maji de Watashi ni Koi Shinasai! (Shiina Miyako)
- Muv-Luv, Muv-Luv Alternative, & Muv-Luv Altered Fable (Kamiyo Tatsumi)
- My Girlfriend is the President (Irina Vladimirovna Putina)
- Nee Pon? × Rai Pon! (Zero)
- Saya no Uta (Ōmi Takahata)
- The Witcher 3: Wild Hunt (Priscilla)
- Yoake Mae Yori Ruri Iro Na (Natsuki Takamizawa)

=== Drama CDs ===
- Final Fantasy Tactics Advance Radio Edition (Montblanc)
- G Senjō no Maō (Mizuha Shiratori)
- Maji de Watashi ni Koishinasai! (Miyako Shiina)
- Mossore
