= The Devil on G-String =

2008 video game

G-senjou no Maou - The Devil on G-String
- Developer: Akabeisoft2
- Publishers: Akabeisoft2; Sekai Project
- Platform: Windows
- Release: JP: May 29, 2008; WW: November 5, 2015
- Genres: Eroge, Visual novel
- Mode: Single-player

The Devil on G-String (Japanese: G線上の魔王, Hepburn: G Senjō no Maō) is a Japanese adult visual novel developed by Akabeisoft2 and first released for Windows as a DVD on May 29, 2008, in limited and regular editions. The gameplay follows an interactive branching plot line with multiple scenarios, and focuses on the appeal of the four female main characters. The title "G Senjō no Maō" comes from August Wilhelmj's "Air on the G String", an adaptation of J.S. Bach's original "Air", and Schubert's Erlkönig known as Maō in Japan.

== Gameplay ==
A scene in The Devil on G-String depicting Kyōsuke talking to Yuki (left) and Mizuha (right).

Much of the gameplay in The Devil on G-String requires little interaction from the player, because the majority of the time is spent reading the text that appears on the game's screen. The text being displayed represents the thoughts of the characters or the dialogue between them. The player is occasionally presented with choices to determine the direction of the game. Depending on what is chosen, the plot may progress in a specific direction. There are four different routes in total.

== Characters ==
The player assumes the role of Kyōsuke Azai (浅井京介, Azai Kyōsuke), the protagonist of The Devil on G-String and adopted son of a powerful yakuza boss. Though he acts kind and understanding in most social situations, this persona is a pretense used to hide his work as a highly intelligent and ruthless businessman. As the president of one of his father Gonzō's corporations, Kyōsuke employs brutal—and often illegal—business tactics in order to pay off a massive debt accruing intense interest. This debt is held against him by his father and is supposedly partially representative of the costs of raising him, "down to the last sheet of toilet paper". Due to Gonzō's abusive "education" and the severity of Kyōsuke's debt, he views money as the means, end, and purpose of life. Kyōsuke also notably loves classical music.

Maō (魔王, Demon King, Devil; voiced by: Jun Fukuyama) is an alias of the primary antagonist of the game. At the start of the game, "Maō's" background is shrouded in secrecy and little is known about him. He seemingly derives his name from Schubert's lied "Erlkönig", but the game later adds multiple layers to this by including references to old role-playing games in which a Demon King is the primary antagonist and to codenames of the character's previous associates.

Haru Usami (宇佐美ハル, Usami Haru; voiced by: Rino Kawashima) is the main heroine of The Devil on G-String. She can be considered a game-theoretical and observational genius as well as a musical prodigy, but her social skills are severely lacking, as evidenced by her awkwardly long, unkempt hair. Haru has a long history with "Maō" but is hesitant to discuss it with the rest of the game's cast. Other characters include: Eiichi Aizawa (相沢栄一, Aizawa Eiichi; voiced by: Mahiru Kaneda), a close friend of Kyōsuke who harbors a comedic dark side beneath his boy-next-door facade; Tsubaki Miwa (三輪椿姫, Miwa Tsubaki; voiced by: Sumire Murasakibana), Kyōsuke's classmate and an obsessive diary keeper; Kanon Azai (浅井花音, Azai Kanon; voiced by: Haruka Kawai), the only natural child of Kyōsuke's adoptive father and a world-class figure skater; Mizuha Shiratori (白鳥水羽, Shiratori Mizuha; voiced by: Hyosei), another of Kyōsuke's classmates and the daughter of their school's owner; and Yuki Tokita (時田ユキ, Tokita Yuki; voiced by: Hokuto Minami), Haru's close friend with a talent for criminal psychology and negotiations.

== Plot ==
The Devil on G-String's story revolves around Kyōsuke Azai, the adopted son of Gonzō Azai (浅井権三, Azai Gonzō), a yakuza leader. Kyōsuke works under Gonzō in order to pay off the sum total of a loan taken out by his biological father and the costs of raising Kyōsuke himself under Gonzō's wing. He eventually hopes to reunite with his mother, from whom he was separated many years earlier. At the beginning of the game, a girl named Haru Usami transfers into Kyōsuke's school and introduces herself as "a hero". She initially ignores Kyōsuke, but soon asks him if he knows a person named "Maō". Kyōsuke replies to the peculiar question in the negative, but later that evening, receives a bizarre email from a "Maō". Due to his possible connection to yakuza turf wars, Gonzō instructs Kyōsuke to find and capture the enigmatic figure. The game's expository first chapter ends with "Maō" directly challenging Haru to discover his identity.

The second chapter of the game, "Kidnapping Spree", centers on the struggles of the Miwa family to keep their family's orchard, despite both Kyōsuke and "Maō" independently working with a developer who wishes to buy the land. When "Maō" kidnaps the youngest child of the Miwa family and asks for an exorbitant sum as ransom, Kyōsuke helps the eldest, his classmate Tsubaki, obtain the necessary funds via a yakuza loan. Depending on the player's choices, the Miwa family can be saved (granting an ending showing Tsubaki and Kyōsuke cohabitating years later) or forced to accept the developer's offer in order to repay their debt. In all scenarios, "Maō's" demands are met despite the best efforts of the protagonists and Tsubaki's brother is returned safely. It is first strongly suggested in this chapter that "Maō" may in fact be an alter ego of Kyōsuke: his psychiatrist is shown to be acutely interested in memory lapses that coincide with severe headaches and, for the player, with "Maō's" activity.

The third chapter of the game, "The Mephistopheles Murders", sees "Maō" take on an accomplice in order to kill people involved with Kanon Azai's skating career. He poses as a radical nationalist to gain the trust of his similarly idealistic accomplice; Haru, Kyōsuke, and Haru's friend Yuki work to save Kanon and her chance at an Olympic quota. After capturing and interrogating the accomplice, the protagonists follow his information into a trap: the entire plot was actually a diversion. "Maō's" actual target was Gonzō, whose enemies he had been arming in order to draw his target out personally. Gonzō had considered this possibility and evades the car bombing which was meant to kill him. It is possible for the player to follow an alternate path in this chapter which sees Kanon and Kyōsuke build a romantic relationship, and portrays her figure skating career in a more detailed manner.

In the fourth chapter, "Blind Spot in Negotiations", one of Kyōsuke's classmates takes Mizuha Shiratori and a teacher hostage on the school grounds after hours. Depending on the player's choices, this can be resolved quickly and segue into a romantic subchapter involving Mizuha, or can become a drawn-out affair which eventually leads to "Maō's" final plan. In the latter case, Kyōsuke and his fellow yakuza surround the school while Yuki Tokita, with her extensive knowledge of the criminal mind, negotiates with the captor. Surprisingly, the hostage scenario ends with the revelation that Yuki had enabled the captor to escape at the very beginning of negotiations, and was herself the mastermind behind the event in an attempt to financially ruin Mizuha's father. Furthermore, Yuki is revealed to be Mizuha's neglected half-sister, illuminating her motive. A second, farcical hostage situation occurs when Yuki appears to take Mizuha captive for the second time, but she has no intent to harm her captive. The situation is resolved just as news reaches Kyōsuke that his mother had been killed by a drunk driver.

Shortly thereafter, "Maō" succeeds in killing Gonzō, who had apparently to the player discovered that "Maō" was indeed Kyōsuke. Though by all prior indications "Maō" had been a dissociated identity of the protagonist, the fifth chapter, "G Senjō no Maō", reveals it to be Kyōsuke's supposedly dead older brother Kyōhei. he bears a grudge against Haru and Gonzō because Haru's father, a con artist and civil engineer, took advantage of the death of Kyōsuke's little sister to manipulate his family into accepting Haru's father's enormous gambling debt. Ultimately, Kyōsuke's father murdered Haru's father in revenge, and awaits execution. Similarly, Haru's mother was killed by "Maō" years later; thus orphaned, the familial hatred became mutual in a sense. The title of the game is revealed to be taken from a recurring hallucination associated with post traumatic stress disorder stemming from the moment of Haru's mother's murder: whenever she attempts to play her mother's violin, she sees a demon creep up the instrument's G string. It is revealed that Haru and Kyōsuke met briefly and connected as children.

Later in the chapter, Kyōhei initiates an elaborate scheme that drives the entire downtown area into chaos. Kyōhei informs the police that he will demand his army of trained mercenaries and rebellious youths to stand down pending the release of several criminals, including his father. At the end of the event, as Kyōsuke escapes the area, Kyōhei calls him and fakes an emotional suicide. The ruse is quickly discovered and the police engage in a shootout with Kyōhei, apparently ending in his death.

In the epilogue, Kyōhei is revealed to have faked his death yet again, and pays Haru a visit at Kyōsuke's home. After a struggle and a chase, Haru nearly murders an unarmed Kyōhei out of rage; Kyōsuke takes the shot instead, in a selfless attempt to spare her from the guilt. When the police question him, rather than attempt to generate sympathy by painting the victim as a brutal killer, Kyōsuke attempts to enrage the investigators with a confession of cruel intent in order to blind them to the facts implicating Haru. He successfully eliminates her association with the crime, but is sentenced to eight years in prison. At his release, he is met by Haru and her daughter, who is revealed to be nearly eight and thus Kyōsuke's. At first, he regrets siring a child who will live with the stigma of a criminal father (like himself, his brother, and Haru), but he is soon overcome by the love in his daughter's eyes, and finally lets go of the past to live for the future.

== Development ==
The Devil on G-String is Akabeisoft2's ninth game in three years, and the second of four games released in 2008 alone. The project is notable as having very few people credited for having taken a part in the creation of the game. Planning for the project and the scenario were headed by Loose Boy. Art direction and character design were done by Alpha.

=== Release history ===
Before The Devil on G-String's initial release, two free game demos became available for download at Akabeisoft2's official website. In the demos, the player is introduced to the main characters in the game that is typical of the gameplay found in a visual novel which includes times during gameplay where the player is given several choices to make in order to further the plot in a specific direction. The full game was first released on May 29, 2008, in limited and regular editions playable as a DVD on a Microsoft Windows PC. The limited edition contained an art collection from Akabeisoft2's previous titles Sharin no Kuni, Himawari no Shōjo, that game's fan disc Sharin no Kuni, Yūkyū no Shōnenshōjo, and Sono Yokogao o Mitsumeteshimau: A Profile Kanzenban, a desk calendar, and a demo of Tayutama: Kiss on my Deity from Akabeisoft2's sister brand Lump of Sugar released two months after The Devil on G-String. An all-ages English version of The Devil on G-String published by Sekai Project was released on Steam on November 5, 2015.

== Related media ==
Two drama CDs set in The Devil on G-String universe were released in 2009, the first on January 9 and the second on June 26. Fourteen episodes of an Internet radio show to promote the drama CDs titled G Senjō no Maō Presents Haru to Eiichi no Hal Ichi Bang×2 (G線上の魔王 Presents ハルと栄一のハル★イチ Bang×2) was distributed on the visual novel's official website between November 7, 2008, and May 8, 2009. The show was hosted by Rino Kawashima and Mahiru Kaneda, the voices of Haru and Eiichi in the visual novel, respectively. The show also featured four other voice actors from the game and drama CDs as guests: Sumire Murasakibana (voice of Tsubaki), Hokuto Minami (voice of Yuki), Satoshi Tsuruoka (voice of Ryūhei Oda (drama CD-only character)), and Jun Fukuyama (voice of Maō, Kyōhei in the drama CDs).

Ichijinsha released a manga anthology titled G Senjō no Maō Comic Anthology on September 25, 2008, under their DNA Media Comics imprint. Ichijinsha also released a fan book titled G Senjō no Maō Visual Fan Book on July 14, 2009.

== Music ==
Most of the game's soundtrack is made up of classical music renditions, arranged by Tiko-μ. In order to enhance this aspect of the game and spread an appreciation for the works the soundtrack is based on, the game includes a feature to show the current soundtrack playing alongside its original classical piece (when applicable). The visual novel has three main theme songs, one opening theme, one insert song played near the end of the game, and one ending theme. The opening theme, "Answer", is sung by Rekka Katakiri, written by Kanoko, and composed by Junpei Fujita. The insert song, "Close Your Eyes", is sung by Ayane, and is written and composed by Chiyomaru Shikura. The ending song, "Yuki no Hane, Toki no Kaze" (雪の羽 時の風), is performed by Barbarian On The Grove featuring Chata and is written and arranged by Bassy. The two theme songs were included on the compilation album The Best Game Vocals of Akabeisoft2 released on February 23, 2007 featuring theme songs from several games by Akabeisoft2. The game's original soundtrack was released by 5pb. on April 24, 2009 in a three-disc set.

== Reception ==
From mid-March to mid-April 2008, about two months before The Devil on G-String's release, the game ranked second in national PC game pre-orders in Japan. The limited edition of The Devil on G-String ranked second in terms of national sales of PC games in Japan in May 2008, and the regular edition ranked twenty-sixth for the same month. The limited edition ranked again for June 2008 at 23rd-highest selling in Japan. The Devil on G-String ranked first for the month of May 2008, in terms of sales at Getchu.com. The game ranked again at sixteen the following month in the same ranking. For the first half of 2008, The Devil on G-String ranked third best in sales at Getchu.com. The game received first prize at the Bishōjo Game Awards for 2008.
