= Oma Ichimura =

Japanese voice actress

Oma Ichimura (壱智村 小真, Ichimura Oma; born Tomoko Omata (小俣 智子, Omata Tomoko), May 3, 1977 in Kanagawa) is a Japanese freelance voice actress who worked for Office CHK.

== Filmography ==
- Yukiko Hirohara in 11eyes
- Poyomon in Digimon Adventure 02
- Satomi Arimoto in Fruits Basket
- Uribo in Himawari!
- Sakuya in Izumo: Takeki Tsurugi no Senki
- Marina Koizumi and Miho Maruyama in Ojamajo Doremi series
- Nelp and Loveran in Pretty Cure
- Aya Hoshino in Super GALS! Kotobuki Ran
- Chiyo and Chinatsu in Swing Out Sisters
- Natsume Sorayama in Sora no Iro, Mizu no Iro (OVA 1)
- Rin Asakura in The World of Narue
- Ibuki Shikimori in Happiness!
- Angelina Nanatsu Sewell in Mashiroiro Symphony
- Starship Ezekiel (a.k.a. "Ell") in My Girlfriend is the President
- Asuka Tooyama, Natsuki Mitobe and Yuki Koyomi in Honoo no Haramase Doukyuusei
- Minamo Shiosaki in Love Death 2, 3 and FINAL!
