= I/O (video game) =

2006 video game

- I/O Revision II cover art
- Developer: Regista
- Publishers: GN Software, Asgard
- Director: Takumi Nakazawa
- Producer: Takumi Nakazawa
- Artist: Soyosoyo
- Writers: Takumi Nakazawa; Nobuaki Takerube
- Composer: Onoken
- Platforms: PlayStation 2, Microsoft Windows
- Release: PlayStation 2: JP: January 26, 2006; Microsoft Windows: JP: August 29, 2008
- Genre: Visual novel
- Mode: Single-player

I/O is a Japanese science fiction mystery visual novel developed by Regista. It was released by GN Software for the PlayStation 2 on January 26, 2006, and by Asgard for Microsoft Windows on August 29, 2008, under the title I/O Revision II. The story begins in Tokyo in 2032, when a total lunar eclipse coincides with a citywide computer malfunction. It follows four protagonists across the real world and the virtual world of Babylon. Completing each route fills gaps in the others, and the full story emerges only after the player completes all four.

Takumi Nakazawa directed and produced the game, devised its concept with Romeo Tanaka, and co-wrote the scenario with Nobuaki Takerube. Soyosoyo designed the characters and Onoken composed the music. Two soundtrack albums and a drama CD were also released.

Famitsu gave the game a score of 25 out of 40. Dengeki Online recommended it to fans of novel-style adventure games looking for a dense story, while noting that its complex plot might limit its appeal.

== Gameplay ==
I/O is a mystery adventure visual novel in which the player chooses one of four protagonists at the start, each with a different scenario. At certain points, the player chooses between two options to advance the plot. These choices affect how the story develops and lead to different endings. The player must complete all four routes to uncover the truth behind the story. The four protagonists are unconnected at the start, but may meet as their stories progress.

The scenarios begin in a "fragmented" state. Each time the player completes a route, information from that route "repairs" related scenes in other routes, unlocking sections that were previously unplayable. The game calls this process "defrag" and tracks its progress on a "defrag map". Routes A and B form a "light" pair, and routes C and D a contrasting "dark" pair. Because the stories become progressively more demanding from A to D, the developers recommend playing the routes in that order to make the overall plot easier to follow.

== Plot ==
The game is set in a near-future Japan where advanced networked technology coexists with a look and atmosphere that have changed little from the present day. At 00:12 on April 26, 2032, a total lunar eclipse is visible over Tokyo. At the same moment, every computer controlling the city malfunctions for 90 seconds. The failure cuts network connections and power, disables vehicle controls, and throws the network's virtual space into chaos. The cause remains unexplained. In the aftermath, strange incidents, terrorism, and network crime become more frequent. The story moves between the real world and Babylon, a virtual world administered by a group called Anunnaki.

The game follows four protagonists, one per route. Route A follows Hinata Aoi (葵 日向, Aoi Hinata), a high school student who has long felt detached from himself and his surroundings, more so since his twin sister Mutsuki (夢月) disappeared two years earlier. On the day of the eclipse, Hinata receives a mysterious email that appears to be an SOS from Mutsuki. He begins searching for her with his childhood friend Sakuya Kawahara (川原 朔夜, Kawahara Sakuya). In route B, Ishtar (イシュタル, Ishutaru), a freelance programmer, leads Criminal, a team of hackers who take on legal hacking work. A clash with a mysterious cracker escalates into a conflict with Code, a cyberterrorist group.

Route C follows a second Ishtar, who is colder than the first and works alone on an investigation within an organization. It remains unclear whether the two Ishtars are the same person. Route D follows a man known only by the code name He (ヒィ), who opposes an organization single-handedly. Both routes take place in a chaotic, decadent city that could be a virtual copy of the real world or a ruined version of it. The game presents these two stories only in fragments.

Criminal's other members include Mika Ayase (綾瀬 みか, Ayase Mika), Kōsuke Miyata (宮田 浩介, Miyata Kōsuke), and twin sisters Mayumi (真佑実) and Masami Shinozuka (篠塚 真佐実, Shinozuka Masami). The school doctor, Yayoi Amane (天音 弥生, Amane Yayoi), is Hinata's confidant. Ea (エア) is a member of Anunnaki and a friend of Ishtar. LEM (レム, Remu), a fairy-like resident of Babylon, is a "Shadow", a player's alter ego within the virtual world.

== Development ==
I/O was developed by Regista. After going independent in 2004, Takumi Nakazawa set out to make an original game. The head of Regista introduced him to Romeo Tanaka, who drafted a basic framework that Nakazawa revised into the game's original concept. Nobuaki Takerube then took over from Tanaka and worked with Nakazawa to develop the concept into a detailed plot. Seeing how demanding the concept was, Takerube chose to write the scenario himself rather than only supervise it. Nakazawa directed and produced the game and co-wrote its scenario.

Soyosoyo, who designed the characters, was recommended to Nakazawa for the ability to draw science fiction scenes and stylish characters quickly. The artist was asked to envision a cyberpunk world along the lines of Blade Runner and Ghost in the Shell. Onoken composed the music. The game features full voice acting for all characters, including the protagonists.

According to Nakazawa, development began with the game's twists and overall structure. A key twist required four protagonists and suited a near-future setting with a virtual world, while a present-day feel was kept to make the game more approachable. Nakazawa and Tanaka each devised one of the game's two main twists.

Nakazawa described two themes. One was the loneliness that arises as advances in virtual technology drive the real and virtual, or body and mind, apart. The other was the search for human connection, which he summed up as "boy meets girl". He designed the routes to contrast with one another, down to their protagonists' personalities, so that the four stories would complement each other. Inspired by the Mesopotamian poem the Epic of Gilgamesh, the game draws on Babylonian mythology, naming some of Babylon's administrators after gods such as Ea. The developers also assigned each of the 22 Major Arcana tarot cards to a character.

In 2012, Nakazawa recalled I/O as one of his most memorable games. The size and complexity of the scenario had led to confusion between him and Takerube; in hindsight, he saw the large amount of information as inevitable for a game themed on the information society. He said the slash in the title had no particular meaning at first, but came to suggest dividing one by zero, an operation he associated with an infinite loop in a program. Although I/O was not meant to be part of his Infinity series, he felt it shared something of that series' essence and wanted to reflect this in the title differently. The game's working title had been AI.

== Release ==
By late October 2004, the game had an official website and its first magazine advertisement had appeared. Magazines began running feature articles on it in December. A soundtrack album, I/O Premium Soundtrack Limited Edition, was first sold at Comiket 67 in December 2004 and went on general sale on February 18, 2005, in a limited run of 2,000 copies. The album includes the opening theme and 10 pieces of background music selected from the 23 tracks Onoken composed for the game. GN Software formally announced the game in March 2005, and it was originally planned for release in autumn 2005. It placed 16th in a ranking of anticipated titles in Dorimaga in March 2005, and 9th in a similar ranking in Famitsu in July 2005, and was showcased at Sega's booth at Tokyo Game Show 2005 in September.

The game was released by GN Software for the PlayStation 2 on January 26, 2006, in both a standard and a limited edition. The limited edition included Illustration Program, a 50-page booklet featuring Soyosoyo's concept sketches and artwork by 20 guest illustrators, along with other merchandise. Shortly after launch, Regista reported that demand had far exceeded expectations, causing widespread stock shortages, and that additional copies were being produced.

The game's complete soundtrack album, I/O Perfect Audiotracks, and the drama CD I/O Overbrowse Damsel were both released by 5pb.'s Five Records label on February 24, 2006. A Microsoft Windows version, titled I/O Revision II, was released by Asgard on August 29, 2008.

== Reception ==
Four Famitsu reviewers gave the game a combined score of 25 out of 40. One liked that the game introduced new developments after the first playthrough. Another thought its mythological elements, including quotations from the Bible and the Epic of Gilgamesh, might divide opinion but were not off-putting because the game's worldview was consistent. A third felt that the game's exploration of the virtual and the real, human life, and ontology gave it the feel of a cyber science fiction coming-of-age story.

Usagi-dan of Dengeki Online recommended the game to fans of novel-style adventure games looking for a dense story, while noting that its complex plot meant it was not for everyone. The reviewer observed that, because of the game's "Defrag System", the first routes end abruptly and the overall picture starts to come together after the third route. Usagi-dan found its themes of life's meaning and human connection moving, praised features such as the autosave and glossary, and felt that the urge to see what happens next made the long playtime easy to overlook.
