= Yeti (Japanese company) =

Japanese video game developer

- Company type: Joint stock company
- Industry: Video games
- Founded: 2005
- Headquarters: Japan
- Products: Visual novels
- Website: yetigame.jp

Yeti (イエティ, Ieti) is a Japanese visual novel producing company which mainly deals in the porting of adult games for the consumer port PlayStation 2 and removing the erotic content in effect. Yeti produced their first original work in December 2007 entitled Myself ; Yourself.

== Games ==
- Dear My Friend: Love Like Powdery Snow, released April 28, 2005; originally by Light.
- Kon Neko: Keep a Memory Green, released October 27, 2005; originally by Marmalade.
- Tamayura: Mitama Okuri no Shi, released June 29, 2006; originally by Akabeisoft2.
- Sekai no Subete: Two of Us, released September 28, 2006; originally by Tamasoft
- Myself ; Yourself, released December 20, 2007; original work by Yeti
- Koihime Musō, released in spring 2008; originally by BaseSon
- Secret Game: Killer Queen, released in spring 2008; originally by Flat.
- Root Double: Before Crime * After Days, released in June 2012, original work by Yeti.
- Rebellions: Secret Game 2nd Stage, released in March 2013, originally by Flat.
- Furuiro Meikyuu Rondo ~Histoire de Destin~, will be released sometime in 2013, originally by Yatagarasu.

=== Canceled Titles ===
- Sharin no Kuni, Himawari no Shōjo, originally by Akabeisoft2.

Canceled due to 5pb. publishing it for Xbox 360.
