= Naka no Hito nado Inai! Tokyo Hero Project =

Japanese visual novel

- Naka no Hito nado Inai! Tokyo Hero Project original visual novel cover.

中の人などいない！ トーキョー・ヒーロー・プロジェクト
- Genre: Science fiction, Harem, Romance
- Video game
- Developer: ALcot
- Publisher: ALcot
- Genre: Eroge, Visual novel
- Platform: Windows
- Released: JP: August 31, 2012; JP: February 22, 2013
- Manga
- Written by: ALcot
- Illustrated by: Yamadori Ofū
- Published by: Enterbrain
- Magazine: Tech Gian
- Published: January 25, 2014
- Volumes: 1

Naka no Hito nado Inai! Tokyo Hero Project (中の人などいない！ トーキョー・ヒーロー・プロジェクト) (Note: Literally "there is no one inside", the phrase is used in reference to fictional characters to show an intent to ignore that there is a real person behind them, fixating on the character instead. It might be used for example for an anime character being voiced by an actor or an online gaming avatar being controlled by a person.) is an adult Japanese visual novel developed and published by ALcot. It was released for Windows as a DVD ROM on August 31, 2012, and released as a regular edition on February 22, 2013. A manga for Tokyo Hero Project was published by Enterbrain, and serialized in Enterbrain's Tech Gian magazine.

== Media ==
An audio CD was released by ALcot on December 28, 2012, entitled Naka no Hito nado Inai! Tokyo Hero Project Original Soundtracks. It contains the original soundtrack for the game, and contains two discs. The first disc has a length sixty four minutes long and fifty seven seconds. The second disc has a length of fifty four minutes and ten seconds. A 129-page visual fan book entitled Naka no Hito nado Inai! Tokyo Hero Project Visual Fan Book was published by Max on June 1, 2013. One volume of a manga derived from the game was published by Enterbrain on January 25, 2014, and serialized in the Tech Gian magazine. Illustrations in the manga were provided by Yamadori Ofū. It can also be read on ALcot's official site.

== Reception ==
On Getchu.com, Tokyo Hero Project ranked No.3 in the monthly sales ranking of August 2012, the month of the game's release. It also made twenty seventh place in September 2012's monthly sales ranking.
