= ALcot =

Japanese video game company

- Type: Private
- Industry: Video games
- Headquarters: Japan
- Website: www.alcot.biz

ALcot (アルコット, Arukotto) is a Japanese company that specializes in adult visual novels. Their first work was Clover Heart's, which was released for PC on November 28, 2003. ALcot is highly associated with the company ALcot Honeycomb, which also produces visual novels. In June 2008, there was a personal information leakage problem for their eroge Clover Hearts.

== Web Radio ==
ALcot has a radio program that is being delivered by HiBiKi Radio Station, from June 6, 2013, under the title, "Soyogi to Rikka no Radio de ALcot!".

== Works ==
- Clover Heart's
- Triptych
- Natsupochi
- FairChild
- Engage Links
- Shinigami no Kiss wa Wakare no Aji
- Kurenai no Tsuki
- My Girlfriend is the President
- Real Imouto ga Iru Ooizumi-kun no Baai
- Vestige -Yaiba ni Nokoru wa Kimi no Omokage-
- Kicking Horse Rhapsody
- Onigokko!
- Aneiro
- Naka no Hito nado Inai! Tokyo Hero Project
- Clover Day's
- LOVEREC.

== ALcot Classic Works 2013 ==
ALcot produced a DVD box called ALCot Classic Works 2013 containing five of their visual novel installments, Clover Heart's, Engage Links, FairChild, Natsupochi, and Triptych. ALcot Classic Works 2013 also includes the windows version for Clover Heart's, which is 18+. It was released on September 27, 2013.
