= Root Double: Before Crime * After Days =

2012 video game

- Windows cover art, featuring (left to right) Natsuhiko, Yuuri, and Watase
- Developers: Regista, Yeti
- Publishers: JP: Yeti; WW: Sekai Project
- Director: Takumi Nakazawa
- Producer: Takumi Nakazawa
- Artists: Mikeou; Wadapen; Narumi Ōtaka; Eco
- Writers: Souki Tsukishima; Tora Tsukishima; Moyashi Himukai
- Composer: Takuma Sato
- Platforms: Xbox 360; Microsoft Windows; PlayStation 3; PlayStation Vita; Nintendo Switch
- Release: June 14, 2012: Original version Xbox 360; JP: June 14, 2012 Microsoft Windows; JP: September 28, 2012 Xtend Edition PlayStation 3; JP: October 24, 2013 PlayStation Vita; JP: July 24, 2014; NA: March 13, 2018; EU: June 19, 2020 Microsoft Windows; WW: April 27, 2016 Nintendo Switch; WW: November 26, 2020
- Genre: Visual novel
- Mode: Single-player

Root Double: Before Crime * After Days, (Note: Root Double: Before Crime * After Days (Japanese: ルートダブル -Before Crime * After Days-, Hepburn: Rūto Daburu -Before Crime * After Days-)) stylized as ROOT√DOUBLE, is a visual novel video game developed in a collaboration between Regista and Yeti, and released by Yeti for Xbox 360 and Microsoft Windows in 2012. An updated version with a new ending, titled Root Double: Before Crime * After Days: Xtend Edition, was released for PlayStation 3 and PlayStation Vita in 2013 and 2014, and was released in English by Sekai Project for Microsoft Windows in 2016; the PlayStation Vita version was released in North America in 2018 and is planned to be released at a later date in Europe. It was also ported to Nintendo Switch in 2020.

The game is set in 2030 in a combined city and research hub whose residents are unable to interact with the outside world without permission from the local government. After an accident at an institute in the city, one of the game's two protagonists, Watase Kasasagi, is sent in as part of a rescue team; the other, a high school student named Natsuhiko Tenkawa, happens to be in the institute as well at the time of the accident.

== Gameplay ==
The Senses Sympathy System interface in Root Double.

Root Double is a visual novel where much of the gameplay involves reading the story's narrative through text and imagery.

At the start of the game, there are two story scenarios for the player to choose from: Route After and Route Before (denoted in game as √After and √Before, respectively; A and B for short). Each scenario occurs from the perspective of a different character whom the player assumes the role of; After has the player take on the role of Watase Kasasagi and Before has the player take on the role of Natsuhiko Tenkawa. Upon completion of both scenarios, Route Current (√Current; C for short) becomes available and upon completion of Current, Route Double (√Double; D for short) is unlocked.

An essential component in the game is the "Senses Sympathy System" ("SSS"). Throughout the game, the player is given a chance to adjust their impressions ("Senses") of the characters (including the characters that they are taking the role of) using sliders. The SSS is based on the Enneagram of Personality, with each of the main characters of the story representing one of the nine different types. At scenes where the player is allowed to give their input - referred to as "branches" - the enneagram figure will show up on the screen; however, only characters that are relevant to the scene can have their Senses be adjusted. How the player interacts with the SSS at the branches directly influence the progress of the story. When the enneagram figure shows up, the color surrounding the outline of the graph signifies the importance of the player's input. There are three different colors: blue, yellow, and red. Blue are branches that can influence a character's overall favor but are generally not important to the story; however, skipping too many blue branches can be detrimental later on. Yellow are branches that affect a character's actions and change how the story advances. Finally, red are branches in which deciding incorrectly will lead to an undesirable outcome, making the inputs at these branches critical.

Each story scenario has multiple endings based on the results of the SSS up to certain points in the game. In the cases that the player gets a "bad ending", a hint is given which would give tips on how to avoid it; should the player not want the hints, they can be turned off in the options menu.

== Synopsis ==
=== Setting ===
Root Double takes place at a fictional location in Japan named Rokumei City, a combined city and research hub with 180,000 residents. In the world of Root Double, humans who have extrasensory perception abilities has become commonplace. From its initial discovery, researchers named these abilities "Beyond Communication" ("BC") and the people who have BC "Communicators". Due to the lack of knowledge and fear about BC, Communicators are discriminated against by ordinary people; as a result, the Japanese government enacted laws to help protect Communicators, turning certain cities - including Rokumei - into Communicator-friendly territories where Communicators could live together and be given guidance. The residents of the city cannot interact with the outside world unless given permission by the government; in exchange for this, and for giving up their privacy, they receive many benefits such as exemption from taxes and access to high-quality medical facilities.

Rokumei City is home to over 300 research facilities; the largest one is named the 6th Laboratory of Atomic and Biological Organization ("LABO") and conducts nuclear research. The story begins on September 16, 2030 at 6:19AM when an explosion occurs at LABO. Watase, the captain of the rescue squad of Rokumei City, is dispatched to LABO along with his teammates after the incident occurs. Around the same time Natsuhiko, a high school student and resident of Rokumei City, is inside the LABO facility and trying to escape with his friends. During the rescue operation, LABO's nuclear reactor suffers a meltdown, sending the facility to lockdown and trapping the rescue squad and survivors of the explosion inside LABO for nine hours. Due to the meltdown, lethal radiation has leaked and contaminated the facility, putting the two groups in danger of radiation exposure. There exists anti-radiation medication (called "AD") that can temporarily lower the effects of radiation exposure but there is not enough of the medication offered until the lockdown lifts.

=== Main characters ===
Depending on the story route being played, the player takes on the role of one of two protagonists. Nine central characters appear over the course of the two routes.

- Captain Watase Kasasagi: Protagonist of √A. The captain of the rescue squad dispatched to the incident at "LABO" on request of the city. ...Or so he's heard, as he's lost his memories due to encountering some sort of trouble. It appears he had a composed and logical (to put it in a bad way, dry) personality before his amnesia, but naturally, he doesn't remember that. The story of √A begins with him waking up in LABO. With him and his companions trapped ina desperate crisis without an escape route, he could not have awoken in any worse circumstances. Prepared to do or die, he tries to search for survivors and find a way out of LABO, but the situation just gets worse by the moment... Can he carve a path through this extreme situation? And what of his memories...?
- Kazami Tachibana: Lieutenant of the rescue squad team. She is a capable officer who has helped out her captain up until now. With Captain Kasasagi having lost his memories due to unforeseen trouble, she takes up the role of captain in his place. She is a superb squad member, and the first female rescue worker in Rokumei City history. So far, female rescue workers have been very rare due to stamina issues, but with her special skills such as her knowledge/handling of equipment, Kazami rose out above all the other candidates and was appointed as the first female rescue squad worker. Even in an extreme situation like that of √A, she never loses her composure and remains a woman with an iron core.
- Jun Moribe: A rookie rescue worker. She's still a greenhorn, but no one can surpass her when it comes to passion. She admires heroes of justice who defeated the strong and protected the weak, so she wants to become one. Having becoming an elite firefighter and rescue worker at her young age shows that she has outstanding talent much like Kazami. She is incredibly dexterous. Her nimble fingers allow her to free people trapped in machinery and untangle any mess of rope or cable during a mission when seconds count. Though it clashes with her image, she's taken up knitting as a hobby to improve her dexterity skills.
- Ena Tsubakiyama: A teacher at Natsuhiko's school. She is an egoistic and quirky woman. She's quick-witted, an eloquent speaker, and a model when it comes to taking proactive action, so she's highly trusted by her peers. She's still inexperienced as a teacher, but her passion attracts the students and draws out their motivation. However, she's too aggressive, and has a flaw of occasionally being willing to do anything to achieve her goals... She somehow gets trapped in LABO on September 16. She doesn't appear very compatible with rescue squad, as she's not all that cooperative with them and clashes with their opinions many times.
- Natsuhiko Tenkawa: Protagonist of √B. A high schooler living in Rokumei City. A quiet boy who hates standing out in any way. He is by no means emotionless, but he rarely shows any passionate emotions. He is the one who is there in body, but not in spirit, as he always seems to be gazing somewhere far off. He tends to simply stick to his daily routine. He is very sensitive and quite perceptive of others' emotions. He gets very tired of being a part of groups, and is often alone. His mother (Miyoko Tenkawa) is a scientist who is so busy at work that she rarely comes home. Therefore, Natsuhiko essentially lives alone. It seems that as a child, he was rather cheerful and mischievous, the opposite of his current self... He somehow gets trapped in LABO on September 16.
- Yuuri Kotono: Natsuhiko's childhood friend. In √B, she lives at Natsuhiko's house for some reason. She's bad at household chores, so she's no help on that front. In all truth... she is quiet and of few words, so she almost never talks to anyone. She eats dinner with Natsuhiko, and listens to what he has to say without talking back, and she's always on his side. But her presence is very comforting to Natsuhiko, and is precious to him. She somehow gets trapped in LABO on September 16. In √A, she is rescued shortly after the start of the game. She keeps her silence and barely speaks to anyone, so no one can tell what she's thinking. On top of that, she has bad reflexes and no stamina, so she's mostly a burden.
- Mashiro Toba: Natsuhiko's childhood friend and neighbor. In √B, she is like Natsuhiko's own personal wife (albeit not actually married) in how she constantly takes care of him. Cooking is her specialty (though it's rough). She's not just kind and gentle to Natsuhiko, but to others as well, and so is relied on by many others. On the other hand, she's bad at relying on others, and as such, has a bad habit of not telling her worries to others. She's very active in contrast to Natsuhiko and tries to take him around to all sorts of places, but that's because she's hoping it'll make Natsuhiko to go back to his old self.
- Salyu (Real name: Louise Yui Sannomiya): Half-Japanese, half-French. A young yet bright genius who skipped two grades. "Yui" is her middle name, while "Louise" is her first name. "Salyu" is her nickname. A girl with a difficult to approach air about her that contains a mystique far removed from normal people. She is of very few words, and her expression rarely changes. She's not oppressive, but nor does she attempt to make any friends of her own. Despite that, she appears actively conscious of Natsuhiko. She constantly carries a ferret mascot-type robot called "Alice". She transfers into Natsuhiko and Mashiro's high school early on in √B. It appears she's a distant relative of Natsuhiko's, as she moves into Natsuhiko's house right after she transfers... She somehow gets trapped in LABO on September 16. Furthermore, she runs away from the rescue squad after they find her and try to save her. A mysterious girl indeed.
- Keiji Ukita: Natsuhiko's neighbor who works as a researcher (his position is something along the lines of an assistant manager) at the research institute. He seems like an inflexible old man, but he's brimming with a sense of justice, an honest man who can be depended upon as long as injustice is not at play. He got trapped in LABO after the explosion on September 16 when he failed to evacuate in time. It seems he feels a sense of responsibility for the incident as a member of the facility's staff.

Other characters include Miyoko Tenkawa, Natsuhiko's mother and a high-ranking researcher at LABO who managed to escape the facility in time; Dojima and Hijama, two rescue workers trapped somewhere inside LABO; and the Rescue Squad Commander, who attempts to contact the team trapped inside and provide support.

=== Story ===
==== Route √After ====
Captain Watase wakes up with amnesia inside LABO, trapped along with rescue workers Kazami and Jun, researcher Ukita, and civilians Ena and Yuuri. As they continue to find the bodies of other rescue workers and researchers, the group proceed to find an exit to the facility, putting out fires and attempting to locate the three children also trapped inside LABO: Natsuhiko, Mashiro, and Salyu. With radiation slowly increasing, the group manage to locate a service elevator as an exit, but find that the elevator is out of service, and the corpse of a young girl lays resting at its door. They continue their search for the children, but Ukita and Jun begin to grow suspicious of Watase. Yuuri disappears, and Watase finds her dead body before it disappears from sight when he gathers the others. With nowhere to go, Watase heads towards the nuclear reactor in Area N, only to find that there is no nuclear reactor in LABO: a giant machine is found inside, and Natsuhiko's bleeding body rests on it. As Ukita, Jun, and Kazami begin to turn aggressive and psychotic towards the others, Watase learns that he himself was actual a terrorist, who had shot Natsuhiko and caused the facility's lockdown.

==== Route √Before ====
Natsuhiko, Salyu, and Mashiro head towards LABO to prevent a terrorist plot, but as they venture inside, Natsuhiko encounters Yuuri, a girl who lives at his home and has PTSD following an incident 9 years ago in LABO. Over the course of their adventure inside LABO, Natsuhiko recounts the events of the previous week. Six days prior, Natsuhiko unlocks his BC Telepathy ability when Ukita gets into a car accident. The next day, the mysterious transfer student Salyu moves in with Natsuhiko and Yuuri. He, Salyu, and Mashiro grow closer over the next few days, until Mashiro reveals she has the ability of Empathy and had read the mind of a terrorist planning an attack. The trio prevent a disaster in a BC facility, leading to the criminals' arrest, but they discover that the terrorists' true plot is to infiltrate LABO and cause a meltdown. The kids head towards LABO, catching up to the present time, where Natsuhiko learns that Yuuri died 9 years ago in the incident at LABO, and Natsuhiko was the one who was actually suffering from PTSD until he manifested a delusion of Yuuri that lives with him. As he and Mashiro head towards an exit, Mashiro is shot by a terrorist: Watase. Natsuhiko is shot in Area N, but not before he uses his heightened BC abilities to erase Watase's memories.

==== Route √Current ====
Believing to be a disembodied ghost, Natsuhiko witnesses the events of √After through the amnesiac Watase's eyes, using his BC to falsify Watase's memories and create illusions when necessary. When Natsuhiko sees his own bleeding-yet-breathing body in Area N, he realizes that he has actually been connected to Watase's mind with the Senses Sympathy (SS) ability. When the other survivors turn aggressive against Watase, Natsuhiko returns back to his body.

==== Route √Double ====
Natushiko and Watase find Yuuri still alive and trapped inside a secret room in LABO. Natsuhiko uses SS to delve into Yuuri's memories, learning that her death was faked and she was imprisoned in LABO to be tested as an SS user; when the current incident began, Yuuri guided Natsuhiko with SS through his memories to overcome his PTSD. Natsuhiko and Yuuri then venture into the memories of Watase, where they discover that his twin sister had died in a city-wide arson incident caused by a Communicator, and that the terrorist group Q recruited him and Ukita to attack LABO; the pair, Dojima, and Hiyama infiltrated the facility to rescue the test subjects (Yuuri and the young girl) before a malice infected them and led them to attack the kids. Natsuhiko and Yuuri discover that the young girl, Subject N, was an SS user who dispersed her own Malice to those near her, falsifying Watase's memories into believing he hates Communicators and was kidnapping the test subjects rather than rescue them. With the malice purged from his mind, Watase teams up with Natushiko to purge the remaining Malice, which had infected Ukita, Jun, and Kazami when they found Subject N's body.

From Ukita's memories, they learn of his desire to rescue the test subjects from the experiments conducted in LABO, and his plan to use the Area N machine to cause a lockdown. From Jun's memories, they learn of the gas explosion that killed her friend and Kazami's sister, Nagisa, which motivated her to become a rescue worker. Natsuhiko also delved into the memories of Ena, who is a commissioner investigating the BC research conducted in LABO and posing as a teacher, and Salyu, who is the daughter of the original test subject, Communicator A, who caused the original arson incidents. In Kazami's memories, they discover that Subject N is actually Nagisa, whose death was also faked in order to imprison her inside LABO, and that Kazami had developed SS abilities as well. With the last remaining malice from Nagisa expunged, all 9 survivors plan an escape route using an emergency door activation and escaping through the coolant pipes. Outside the facility, Watase threatens Natsuhiko to hand over Yuuri, so that she can be taken to Q. Natsuhiko reveals that Q is the cause of all the major incidents that have occurred in Rokumei over the years, and so he willingly turns himself in.

One year later, Watase is released from prison, and the truth about LABO and Rokumei City is publicly revealed. The group reunite and continue their united efforts to confront and arrest the members of Q.

== Development ==
The game was developed in a collaboration between Regista and Yeti. It was directed and produced by Takumi Nakazawa, and written by Team Tsukishima, which consists of Souki Tsukishima, Tora Tsukishima, and Moyashi Himukai, based on an original concept by Nakazawa; the writers were recruited and chosen through a competition. The music was composed by Takuma Sato. The main characters were designed by Mikeou, and the side characters by Wadapen and Narumi Ōtaka. Eco was the colorist and the supervisor for the creation of the event CGs. According to Nakazawa, the key concepts of the game are "escape from a locked room", "lethal crisis", "suspect everything in an extreme situation", "near future sci-fi", and "group drama". He cited the works of Christopher Nolan and J. J. Abrams as heavy influences on Root Double, mentioning Nolan's Memento and Inception, and Abrams' Fringe and Lost; another work that inspired him was the film The Poseidon Adventure.

In early 2016, Nakazawa said that he had originally come up with the concept for the game around ten years prior. His concept was a story depicting two protagonists with opposing ideologies. At this point, the game was not an escape story; that element was added later to make the story more entertaining. He started with thinking of its twist, then its setting, its characters, and the story. As he developed the story, he made changes to the characters and setting. While Nakazawa's previous works focused on characters awaiting rescue from dangerous situations, he wanted to reverse that situation with Root Double; he wanted the protagonists to be in opposite situations, so he had one be involved in the rescuing and the other being rescued. The protagonists' differences were also reflected in their respective routes, with Route A focusing on suspense and survival, and B focusing on mystery and drama. The route structures were made to be polar opposites, with A starting out thrilling, and with B gradually becoming more thrilling. Root Double was Souki Tsukishima's first work on a long "novel game"; he felt that he did not have much experience with this, so he put a lot of effort into writing the story. He found the first draft that he received to be interesting, but also thought that it would be hard to write; he took care in making sure his scenario matched up perfectly with Nakazawa's idea of the game's world. The story was written by Team Tsukishima, and was refined and revised over the course of several meetings.

The game was first mentioned on a teaser site in December 2010, where it was called a "new sci-fi suspense adventure". In January 2011, Yeti announced the game, and said that they planned to release it in 2011. In March 2011, Yeti announced that they would not publicize the game, because of its themes and the 2011 Tōhoku earthquake and tsunami; development was put on hold, but in July 2011, Yeti revealed that it had been taken up again, and that it would be released for the Xbox 360. They had considered changing the background story of the game, but eventually decided to keep the story unchanged and follow their original plan, while also portraying the in-game disaster "more carefully and conscientiously". There had been some discussion about whether the game should be released or not, but the development team felt that it was important to portray how "hope can be found even in the deepest despair". Xtend Edition, an updated version of the game, which features a new ending, was developed for the PlayStation 3; according to Nakazawa, it felt necessary to make Xtend Edition to get more people to play the game.

After Nakazawa heard English-speaking people ask on Facebook if the game would be available in English, he looked into it, finding that the English-speaking audience for visual novels had grown. He thought that the content of Root Double would be enjoyable for English-speakers, so it was decided that the game would be translated. At their panel at Anime Expo 2015, Sekai Project announced that they would localize Xtend Edition in a collaboration with Lemnisca Translations, and release it for Microsoft Windows. They launched a crowdfunding campaign on Kickstarter for the game in January 2016, with a goal of raising 135,000 USD. 53% of this would go to licensing, programming and porting, 27% to translation and editing, 10% to Kickstarter and card processing fees, and 10% to shipping fees. They also had three planned "stretch goals", allowing for the production of a fanbook and the translation of drama CDs based on the game if they manage to raise more than the goal. During the campaign, Sekai started examining the possibility of releasing the game for the PlayStation Vita; they announced that they had managed to get it approved by Sony, and that they would be able to release it for that platform. This required additional programming by Regista, as the PlayStation Vita version's engine needed to be reformatted to support the English script. The US$135,000 goal was reached on February 2.

== Release ==
On March 29, 2012, a demo was made available in which the player can play all the way to one of the game's endings. The game was released by Yeti on June 14, 2012, for the Xbox 360, and on September 28, 2012, for Microsoft Windows. Xtend Edition was released on October 24, 2013, for the PlayStation 3, and on July 24, 2014, for the PlayStation Vita. The Microsoft Windows version of Xtend Edition was initially estimated to be released worldwide in March 2016, but was delayed to April 27. The PlayStation Vita version was released on March 13, 2018 in North America, and will be released at a later date in Europe. As the PlayStation Vita version's file size exceeds the size limitation for physical PlayStation Vita games, both the Japanese and English PlayStation Vita releases are only available digitally.

== Reception ==
Reception

Aggregate score
Aggregator	Score
GameRankings	83%

Review scores
Publication	Score
Famitsu	8/8/8/8 (X360) (Note: Each of the four reviewers in Famitsu scored the game on a ten point scale); 9/9/8/7 (PS3)
Hardcore Gamer	4/5
RPGFan	78%

Root Double was well received by critics. It was the 15th highest selling video game in Japan during its launch week, with 5,450 copies sold, and at the end of 2012 it was the 350th best selling video game of the year in Japan, with 6,599 copies sold. The PlayStation 3 version was the 392nd best selling video game of the year in Japan of 2013, with 2,567 copies sold. The Steam release had an estimated total of 26,200 players by July 2018.
