= Ayumu Nakazawa =

Japanese voice actor

Ayumu Nakazawa (中澤歩/中澤 アユム, Nakazawa Ayumu) is a Japanese voice actor specializing in the voicing of characters from eroge (adult video games). He was a member of AG Promotion.

== Filmography ==
=== Video games ===
- EVE Burst Error (1995) – Susumu Nikaido
- One: Kagayaku Kisetsu e (1998) – Mamoru Sumii
- Meguri, Hitohira (2003) – Toshinobu Okina
- Clover Heart's (2003) – Roberto Ichimonji
- Angel Type (2005) – Akira Shidara
- Harukoi Otome (2006) – Tasuku Oikawa
- Konna Ko ga itara Boku wa mou (2006) – Susumu
