= Koihime Musō =

Japanese video game, manga and anime series

- Koihime Musō original visual novel cover

恋姫†無双 ～ドキッ☆乙女だらけの三国志演義～ (Koihime Musō: Doki Otome Darake no Sangokushi Engi)
- Genre: Action, comic fantasy
- Video game
- Developer: BaseSon (Windows); Yeti (PS2)
- Publisher: Nexton (Windows); Regista (PS2); MangaGamer (Europe, US Windows)
- Genre: Visual novel, Strategy, Eroge
- Platform: Windows; PlayStation 2
- Released: January 26, 2007 (Windows); April 11, 2008 (Windows re-release); November 20, 2008 (PS2); February 28, 2011 (Europe, US Windows)
- Video game

Shin Koihime Musō: Otome Ryōran Sangokushi Engi
- Developer: BaseSon (Windows); Yeti (PSP, PS2)
- Publisher: Nexton (Windows); Yeti (PSP, PS2)
- Genre: Visual novel, Strategy, Eroge
- Platform: Windows; PlayStation Portable; PlayStation 2
- Released: Windows; December 26, 2008; July 23, 2010 (Shin Koihime Musou Moeshouden); PlayStation Portable; September 22, 2010 (Wu-Hen); October 28, 2010 (Wei-Hen); November 25, 2010 (Shu-Hen); PlayStation 2 November 10, 2011
- Video game

Shin Koihime Musō: Otome Taisen Sangokushi Engi
- Developer: Rain Entertainment
- Publisher: JP: BaseSon; NA: Pentavision Global
- Genre: Fighting
- Platform: Arcade (RCI Neo Standard)
- Released: July 30, 2011
- Manga
- Written by: BaseSon
- Illustrated by: Yayoi Hizuki
- Published by: ASCII Media Works
- Magazine: Dengeki G's Festival! Comic
- Original run: April 26, 2008 – October 26, 2010
- Volumes: 2
- Anime television series
- Directed by: Nobuaki Nakanishi
- Written by: Gō Zappa
- Studio: Doga Kobo (Note: Production assistance (制作協力) for all episodes provided by Studio Live.)
- Licensed by: NA: Sentai Filmworks
- Original network: Tokyo MX, Chiba TV, TV Aichi, KBS Kyoto, TV Saitama, AT-X, Anime Network
- Original run: July 8, 2008 – September 23, 2008
- Episodes: 12 + OVA
- Anime television series

Shin Koihime Musō
- Directed by: Nobuaki Nakanishi
- Written by: Gō Zappa
- Studio: Doga Kobo
- Licensed by: NA: Sentai Filmworks
- Original network: Tokyo MX, Chiba TV, TV Saitama, AT-X, Anime Network
- Original run: October 5, 2009 – December 21, 2009
- Episodes: 12 + 2 OVAs
- Anime television series

Shin Koihime Musō: Otome Tairan
- Directed by: Nobuaki Nakanishi
- Written by: Gō Zappa
- Studio: Doga Kobo
- Licensed by: NA: Sentai Filmworks
- Original network: Tokyo MX, Chiba TV, TV Saitama, AT-X, Anime Network
- Original run: April 4, 2010 – June 17, 2010
- Episodes: 12
- icon

Koihime Musō: Doki Otome Darake no Sangokushi Engi (恋姫†無双 ～ドキッ☆乙女だらけの三国志演義～; lit. "Love Princess†Unmatched: Throb Romance of Three Kingdoms Filled with Girls") is a series of Japanese adult visual novels and strategy video games primarily developed and published by BaseSon for the Windows and is based on the classic 14th century Chinese novel Romance of the Three Kingdoms by Luo Guanzhong. The first game was developed by BaseSon, and was first released on January 26, 2007, for Windows as two DVD-ROMs, followed by a re-release on April 11, 2008, containing an extra CD-ROM.

Koihime Musō: Doki Otome Darake no Sangokushi Engi has made several transitions to other media. A manga adaptation by Japanese illustrator Yayoi Hizuki was first serialized in the Japanese magazine Dengeki G's Festival! Comic on April 26, 2008. An anime adaptation produced by Doga Kobo began broadcasting on July 8, 2008, and has since released two additional seasons.

== Premise ==
The game is set in ancient China during and after the fall of the Han dynasty with some major differences, most notably: most of the male characters in the novel have become female, and the Three Kingdoms that were formed after the Han Dynasty have already been established. Despite each kingdom being ruled by an independent monarchy, they are still loyal to the Han empire. However, the empire is on the verge of collapse as civil unrest, banditry and infighting bring turmoil to the nation.

As the empire finally collapse and warlords wage war with each other, amidst the turmoil several major factions are formed, ready to rule and unite the fractured nation. These major factions (5 in Koihime Musō, 7 in the sequel) are the Shoku faction (Chinese: 蜀, Shǔ) led by Kazuto Hongō in Koihime Musō and in the sequel, Queen Ryūbi (Liu Bei) of the Kingdom of Shu, the Gi faction (Chinese: 魏, Wèi) led by Queen Sōsō (Cao Cao) of the Kingdom of Wei, the Go faction (Chinese: 吳, Wú) led by Princess Sonken (Sun Quan) of the Kingdom of Wu and in the sequel, her older sister Queen Sonsaku (Sun Ce), the Tōtaku faction (Chinese: 董卓, Dong Zhuo) led by Governess Tōtaku, Governor of Dong province, the En/Yuan faction led by Lady Enshō, Lord of Yuan province, and in the sequel the Kōkintō/Yellow Turban Rebels led by the Zhang sisters, Chōkaku, Chōhō and Chōryō and the Nanban/Southern Barbarians led by Mōkaku.

== Gameplay ==
The gameplay in Koihime Musō follows a linear plot line, which offers pre-determined scenarios and courses of interaction, and focuses on the appeal of the female main characters.

== Development ==
Koihime Musō is the fifth game developed by BaseSon, known for creating their first title, One2: Eien no Yakusoku, sequel to Tactics' One: Kagayaku Kisetsu e. Direction and planning for Kohime Musō was done by K. Baggio, who has also provided scenario used in the game, along with fellow writers Izumi Kumashiro, Takuya Aoyama, Assault, and Shiina Arai. Art direction and character designs were split between five people, Kanan Yatsuha, Kantaka, Hinata Katagiri, Eiji Hikage, and Hokuto Saeki. Music in the game was provided by Takumaru, Ryō Mizutsuki, and Ichinoryū Uehara.

== Release ==
Koihime Musō was first available to public on January 26, 2007, as an adult game playable only on Microsoft Windows PCs as two DVD-ROMs. It was subsequently followed by a re-release on April 11, 2008. While the gameplay and scenario in the game is essentially the same, an extra fandisc not available in the original version titled Sheishei Musō (謝謝†無双) was included with the re-release as a CD-ROM. An all-ages consumer port for the PlayStation 2, retitled as Koihime Musō (恋姫†夢想), developed by Yeti and published by Regista was released on October 30, 2008. An enhanced re-release of Koihime Musō, Shin Koihime Musō: Otome Ryōran Sangokushi Engi (真・恋姫†無双 〜乙女繚乱☆三国志演義〜) was released on December 26, 2008, with extended scenario. An English translation of Koihime Musō was released by European publisher MangaGamer on February 28, 2011. Additionally, Gamania formally launched a web-browser based MMO strategy game titled Web Koihime Musō (Web恋姫†夢想) on December 7, 2010, which has since been running on eight different servers. The game allows players to control up to 5 generals at a time from the Shin Koihime Musō cast, join one of the 3 warring factions and try to conquer players of the other two opposing factions with the Red Turban Bandit faction acting as a NPC faction. Like most other browser based MMOs, this game is free to play with a Gamania account, however paying users gain access to enhancements otherwise unavailable or very difficult to obtain.

A PlayStation 2 version, titled Koihime Musō (恋姫†夢想) developed by Yeti and published by Regista was released on October 30, 2008. A new version of Koihime with many new characters Shin Koihime Musō: Otome Ryōran Sangokushi Engi (真・恋姫†無双 〜乙女繚乱☆三国志演義〜) was released on December 26, 2008. A third version of Koihime Shin Koihime Musō: Moe Shōden (真・恋姫†無双～萌将伝～) was released on July 23, 2010. MangaGamer acquired licensing rights to the first game and released it on February 28, 2011. June 2012 the website Jlist.com began selling copies of Koihime Musō as a DX version with restored voices; in a partnership with MangaGamer. Another game named Koihime Eiyūtan has been announced; however, it is unknown if it is a follow-up or a remake of a preceding game. In 2017, 28 June the release of the first part of the Kakumei trilogy with the title - Shin Koihime Musō – Kakumei: Sōten no Haou (真・恋姫†夢想-革命- 蒼天の覇王). The release of the second part is the title - Shin Koihime Musō – Kakumei: Son Go no Ketsumyaku~ (真・恋姫†夢想・革命～孫呉の血脈～) scheduled for 2018, 27 Jule. The release of the third is the title - Shin Koihime Musō – Kakumei: Ryū-ki no Taimou (真・恋姫†夢想・革命～劉旗の大望～) scheduled for 2019.

A 2D fighting game titled Koihime Enbu (恋姫†演武) has been announced for a January 28, 2016 release on the PlayStation 3 and PlayStation 4.

A dungeon management and visual novel hybrid spin-off starring several of the characters from Koihime Musō titled Suzukuri Dungeon: Karin in the Mountain (巣作りカリンちゃん) has been released on Steam and other platforms. The story scenes and adult content have been removed from the Steam version with a patch required to restore them. An expansion called Hoshiyomi no Shintaku exists but this is not available in English.

== Media ==
=== Manga ===
A manga adaptation based on the original visual novel drawn by Japanese illustrator Yayoi Hizuki, with its title renamed as Koihime Musō (恋姫†夢想) began serialization in the second issue of the manga magazine Dengeki G's Festival! Comic published by ASCII Media Works on April 26, 2008.

=== Anime ===
An anime adaptation produced by Doga Kobo began broadcasting in Japan on July 8, 2008, on the Tokyo MX and the Chiba TV broadcasting networks, followed by other broadcasting networks later during the same month. The anime television series, with its title shortened to simply Koihime Musō, featured a story very different from that found in the original visual novel. The original protagonist, Hongo Kazuto, is not present in the anime, nor does the grand battle between the three kingdoms take place. Instead, it features Kan'u's adventure in China, meeting many other characters from the game along the way. The anime is among those noted for sometimes depicting the characters in an exaggerated super deformed manner. After the last episode aired, it was announced an OVA was in production. The OVA was released on April 1, 2009, and actually featured all the characters in an alternate setting - that of a modern high school. The second season of anime, a series based on the second game, entitled Shin Koihime Musō (真・恋姫†無双), continue where the last season left off, aired from October 5, 2009, to December 2009. The third season began airing April 2010, titled Shin Koihime Musō: Otome Tairan (真・恋姫†無双 ～乙女大乱～). The first season has been licensed in North America by Sentai Filmworks; distributor Section23 Films, who released the first season on DVD on January 4, 2011. This release, however, uses the Japanese TV masters and omits improvements made to the animation for the Japanese DVD release. The second and third seasons of Koihime Muso are also licensed by Sentai Filmworks. The second season was released on March 1, 2011, while the third season was released on May 24, 2011.

=== Music ===
The visual novel has four main theme songs, one promotion theme, one opening theme, one insert song, and one ending theme. The promotion theme was "Sōten no Mukō e" (蒼天の向こうへ, On Towards the Blue Skies), and was performed by ☆396☆. The opening theme song was "Hφwling Sφul", which was performed by Rekka Katakiri. The insert theme was "Kuon: Utakata" (久遠 〜詩歌侘〜, Eternity: Simple Poem), while the ending theme was "Shizai Senri: Koihime Yobite Hyakka no Ō to Nasu" (志在千里 〜恋姫喚作百花王〜, Aiming Far: The Princesses in Love Summon the Ruler of Flowers), both performed by Chata. All of the songs were composed and arranged by Takumaru, with the lyrics written by K. Bajjo.

The opening for Shin Koihime Musou is called "HE∀ting Sφul" also by Rekka Katakiri. The ending song is a Piano Arranged version of "Shizai Senri: Koihime Yobite Hyakka no Ō to Nasu" (志在千里 〜恋姫喚作百花王〜, Aiming Far: The Princesses in Love Summon the Ruler of Flowers) by Chata.

The anime has two theme songs. The opening theme, titled "Flower of Bravery", was performed by fripSide, and was composed and written by Chiyomaru Shikura, and arranged by Satoshi Yaginuma. The ending theme, titled "Yappari Sekai wa Atashi☆Legend!!" (やっぱり世界はあたし☆れじぇんど!!) was performed by fripSide NAO project!, composed and arranged by Satoshi Yaginuma, and written by Nao, Shinichirō Yamashita, and Satoshi Yaginuma.

The anime adaptation of Shin Koihime Musou also has two theme songs. The opening is titled "Tōen no Chikai" (闘艶結義〜トウエンノチカイ〜), also performed by Rekka Katakiri. The ending is titled "Otome Ryouran☆Battle PARTY" (乙女繚乱☆ばとるPARTY) by Mai Goto, Nami Kurokawa and Miya Serizono. They also voice lead characters Ryūbi, Kan'u and Chōhi respectively.

== Trivia ==
- Koihime Musō's title names are allusions to Koei's Dynasty Warriors series.

- Koihime Musō is a play on the Japanese title of Dynasty Warriors, Sangoku Musō.
- The sequel game, Shin Koihime Musō, is derived from the Dynasty Warriors games after the first one, which are called Shin Sangoku Musō in Japan.
- The final game in the series, Shin Koihime Musō: Moeshōden is derived from the Xtreme Legends games for Dynasty Warriors, which are called Mōshōden in Japan.
