= W.L.O. Sekai Renai Kikō =

2009 video game

- Developer: Akabeisoft2
- Publishers: 5pb., Akabeisoft2 (Xbox 360)
- Platforms: Windows, Xbox 360
- Release: JP: March 26, 2009; JP: June 3, 2010; (Xbox 360)
- Genre: Visual novel
- Mode: Single-player

W.L.O. Sekai Renai Kikō (W.L.O.世界恋愛機構; officially translated into English as World Love Organization) is a Japanese adult visual novel developed and published by Akabeisoft2 on March 26, 2009. The game was ported to Xbox 360 by 5pb. on June 3, 2010. The Xbox 360 version removed sexual content, but the graphics were increased to 1280x720 resolution and 5.1 surround sound was added. The gameplay in W.L.O. Sekai Renai Kikō is typical of a visual novel, following a plotline which offers pre-determined scenarios with courses of interaction.

A fandisc, W.L.O. Sekai Renai Kikō L.L.S. -Love Love Show- was released for PC on September 24, 2009.

== Gameplay ==
Much of the gameplay requires little interaction from the player as the majority of the time is spent reading the text that appears on the game's screen. The text being displayed represents the thoughts of the characters or the dialogue between them. The player is occasionally presented with choices to determine the direction of the game. Depending on what is chosen, the plot may progress in a specific direction. The PC version contains scenes of the protagonist having sex with the heroines, but these were removed for the console version.

== Music ==
The PC version's opening theme song is Love Paradise (ラブパラダイス), sung by Rekka Katakiri, composed by bassy, and with lyrics by wight. The Xbox 360 version's opening theme song Watashi LOVE na Otome! (ワタシ☆LOVEな☆オトメ！), by the group Afilia Saga East, was released as a CD single on April 28, 2010.

== Reception ==
W.L.O. Sekai Renai Kikō won the gold prize in the character design category in the 2009 Moe Game Awards. It was Getchu's 22nd best selling game of 2009, and the fandisc was the 44th best-selling.
