= My Girlfriend Is the President =

2009 video game

Osananajimi wa Daitouryou: My girlfriend Is the President
- Developer: Alcot
- Publishers: JP: Alcot; NA: JAST USA
- Engine: KiriKiri
- Platform: Microsoft Windows
- Release: JP: 30 October 2009; NA: 28 December 2011
- Genres: Eroge, Visual novel
- Mode: Single Player

Osananajimi wa Daitouryou: My Girlfriend Is the President (幼なじみは大統領: MY GIRLFRIEND IS THE PRESIDENT Osananajimi wa Daitōryō: Mai Gārufurendo Izu za Purejidento) is a visual novel developed by Alcot and later released in English by JAST USA. The game centers on protagonist Junichiro Hondo who awakes one morning to discover his next-door-neighbor and lifelong friend Yukino Ohama has suddenly become president of the fictitious United States of Nippon (Japan).

== Gameplay ==
The player assumes the role of Junichiro Hondo, alike a typical visual novel, the amount of game play is minimal. Occasionally interactions in the game are required to progress to the proceeding scene, by selecting one of the options/choices that appear in the center of the screen. Usually they are choices about what action to elect, depending on the players decision there are multiple endings. There are four main plot lines, each one resolving around the relationship of Junichiro and the heroine. The various routes resolve around the relationship between Junichiro and the heroine of choice. Most of the gameplay is spent reading the text along the bottom, with a character sprite or event CG supporting it.

== Plot ==
=== Story ===
An alien spacecraft controlled by Ku Little Little launches into Earth, destroying the headquarters of the government of Nippon. To avoid chaos, the extraterrestrials brainwash the populace into the belief that Junichiro's childhood friend Yukino Ohama is leader of the country of Nippon. For some reason, the brainwashing does not affect Junichiro himself.

=== Settings and Locations ===
The majority of the game's events and scenarios occur in the United States of Nippon, which is being controlled by Yukino, who was brainwashed to believe she is the president. The Snow House is ostensibly Yukino's home, however it is actually the camouflaged body of Starship Ezekiel. The Flare House is similar to the Snow House except it is sustained and kept by Irina Vladimirovna Putina, the president of Rusia. Lez Star is considered to be the largest and most powerful ship in the game, and it is the headquarters of Guardian and its members. Guardian is a fictional affiliation maintained by the extraterrestrials, the main antagonist, Joseph Soma Mirange, leads Guardian and opposes the protagonists along with Starship Jeremiah and occasionally Kuon.

=== Characters ===
Junichirō Hondō (本堂 純一郎, Hōndo Junichirō)

Junichiro Hondo is the story's protagonist. His actions tend to revolve around supporting Yukino, when not sexually harassing females. An incident earlier in his life resulted in his body's reconstruction, providing him with more power, having a memory that exceeds an ordinary person's, and an excessively tough body. For some reason, he remembers the original world before his childhood friend became president. His personality is that of a sociable, bright, and unabashed pervert with an honest heart. He likes girls and often gets beat up for his sexual harassment. Contrary to his usual playful attitude, he has a strong sense of justice and responsibility, acting with the belief of "I can do it!" and "This happens all the time in Hollywood." He is a parody of Junichiro Koizumi.

Yukino Ohama (桜濱 雪乃, Ohama Yukino)
Voiced by: Aya Tachibana

Yukino Ohama, arguably the most iconic character, is Junichirō's neighbor and childhood friend who was selected to be president of Nippon after the accidental destruction of the previous administration. She has a brainwashing device embedded in her body, turning the world into one where the left becomes right if she says it is. Her approval ratings climb rapidly due to her looks, personality and the brainwashing effects. She even has a fan club among the government officials. She is also known to love anime and manga making her supporters to call her ‘Your Excellency’. She is a daughter of doctors, good at sports, and has excellent grades. Even with that, she isn't boastful about it, and has a modest and gentle personality. Although she wears the mask of a prim and proper high-class lady, but is clumsy and spoiled in her private life. She is also an extremely shy person, fretting over messing up her lines and blushing during speeches. Since she set forth the "Jun-kun Supremacy Doctrine" and has a troublesome side of passing crazy laws for the sake of love, disputes between Junichiro and the bureaucrats never die out. Junichiro embarrasses her often with perverted comments, that causes her to blush more than mildly. Sometimes she pretends to be a dog and plays around with Junichiro which leads to Irina lecturing them. She is a parody of Barack Obama.

Irina Vladimirovna Putina (イリーナ・ウラジーミロヴナ・プチナ, Irīna Urajīmirovuna Puchina)
Voiced by: Erena Kaibara

Irina Vladimirovna Putina is an active duty president who reigns over "Rusia" (Russia) with super charisma. She obtains information that a UFO crashed into Nippon, and visits to talk about laws dealing with import restrictions. On the day of her visit, Irina is seen assaulting a strange man and when she strikes back, Junichiro rescues her, which causes her to become dumbstruck. As it turns out, the man placed a bomb in the building because he suspected something similar to this may happen, so Junichiro escapes with Irina heroically and afterwards she exposes her gratitude. She later visits the Snow House as a guest of Yukino and is able to recognize James Hondo (Junichiro gave her a fake name when they first met), she hugs him to everyone's shock and tells him to become her husband. Yukino makes matters worse by stating that Jin is to be her First Gentleman; a huge scandal erupts as the two women argue over Jin. She becomes interested in him ever since, making an appearance at his school as a transfer student while handling government affairs. However, she becomes disillusioned by the protagonist, the great king of sexual harassment. She disciplines him with her slapping fan to make him into a gentleman even to this day. As a disciplinarian in school, correcting the behavior of the students is her daily routine. She fosters a rivalry against the childhood friend president who's also the head of the student council, and seems to have plans to correct the entire school as a disciplinarian. Yukino and her friends nicknamed her Puchin, but she gets mad when they call her that. She is a parody of Vladimir Putin.

Starship Ezekiel (ヱゼキエル, Wezekieru)
Voiced by: Miru (aka Oma Ichimura)

Starship Ezekiel (called "Ell") is a state-of-the-art UFO designed to take the appearance and actions of a young girl whilst upholding the task of protecting the other characters. Ell has a very obedient and earnest personality, she does whatever is necessary to fulfill the task that she is given and does whatever she can to protect the other members of the cast. However, being such an honest girl causes her to become very depressed when she fails at a task and she usually resorts to placing herself in a box while emitting a depressed aura. It is noted that after crashing on Earth she developed a fear of heights. Her identity is made top secret, and she protects the president and her cabinet as an SP agent in government. She has a tendency to be quiet and shy of strangers and a girl that leaves a fleeting impression in some respects. She can be a natural airhead that takes jokes seriously and does hysterical things. She chooses to get close to Junichiro and take care of him in order to understand the love that's awakening inside of her. Due to having limited knowledge pertaining to sex, she obediently receives Junichiro's sexual harassment. Ell is the younger sister of Starship Jeremiah, better known as Remi, the two share a rivalry because Remi is jealous that her creator Ku Little Little seems more prideful of her newer creation Ell than herself. Her design and personality (as well as artificial nature) are very similar to Hatsune Miku.

Ran Miyoshi (三芳 蘭, Miyoshi Rin)
Voiced by: Sakura Kashiwa

Ran Miyoshi is chief of staff of Nippon as well as an older mentor-like character to Junichirō. She is also a childhood friend of the Junichirō who lives near his house, and is one year older. Whenever she has time off, she often comes over to look after the Junichirō or Yukino, whose parents are seldom at home. As a mysterious woman with an obscure private life, she also works part-time at a Chinese restaurant while serving as Yukino's Chief of Staff. She is the former student council president, currently undertaking the role of student council advisor. She constantly provides various intelligence by making use of her wide connections. She is the person that recommended Yukino to become student council president. She mostly takes care of domestic affairs, and the president and internal staff depend on her. She gives instructions to the staff while serving them her delicious Chinese cuisine. Out of the main female cast, Ran has the largest bust size.

Kuon (クオン)
Voiced by: NiraiKano

Kuon is a very sincere and decent person. She is completely devoted to Irina who is her mistress and wishes for nothing but her happiness. She is on good terms with everyone in the series as long as they don't try to harm Irina, she shows a lot of jealousy towards Junichiro in Irina's Route and falls in love with him in Ran's Route. She wears a maid's attire.

Morita (森田)
Voiced by: Katsuhito Nomura

Morita is a man with light brown hair and glasses, behind them are blood red eyes. He often walks around without a shirt on for an unknown reason, Morita is actually a space detective who administrates a secret agency named Coalition Headquarters.

Quo Little Little (クー・リトルリトル, Kū Ritoruritoru)
Voiced by: Ringo Aoba

Quo is very aloof most of the time, even after vaporizing the leaders of Nippon she didn't seem to care or just didn't show that she cared. She is very proud of Ell, due to her being her latest and most productive creation, she is fond of Junichiro and loves to tease him in situations where he's at conflict with himself, but also helps him in situations where he is with any of the heroines. She loves to play video games, spending hours a day on several games rather than trying to finish a device that will turn the world back to normal. In the fan disc, she and Remi are date-able characters.

Starship Jeremiah (エレミヤ, Eremiya)
Voiced by: Mia Naruse

Starship Jeremiah, better known as Remi, is the older sister of Ell, despite her noticeably short stature and bust size. It is revealed in Ell's route that she is jealous of Ell, because Ku Little Little takes more pride in her newer creation, Starship Ezekiel. Remi seems to have a lesbian attraction to Yukino, which bothers Junichiro a great deal. She is associated with Guardian, making it her mission to kidnap the president of Nippon, Yukino Ohama. She has a habit of saying the phrase mokyu a lot. In the fan disc, she and Ku Little Little are date-able characters.

Saionji (西園寺)
Voiced by: Kazuya Ichijō

A mysterious panda that wears spectacles and has a red bandana/scarf around his neck, he works in a shop called Shitaian. His actual name is Psion. Despite his appearance, Saionji is a colleague of Guardian. Though he takes the form of a panda, he is Ran's father.

Joseph Soma Mirange (ヨーゼフ・相馬（そうま）・メレンゲ, Yūzefu Sōma Merenge)
Voiced by: ??

A strange-looking elderly man who is an accomplice of the co-operation Guardian. His clothes seem to be foreign, around his neck is a necklace with a red jewel of some kind. Joseph is the potential main antagonist in the series.

== Development ==
=== Release ===
Alcot officially released the company's ninth game Osananajimi wa Daitouryou: My girlfriend is the President - Trial Edition on 18 September 2009, with an age rating of 17+. Then the first press limited edition game was officially published and released on 30 October 2009, the age rating was raised to 18+. Osananajimi wa Daitouryou W President Pack was announced to be and was released on 26 August 2011. The visual novel received its first English translation on 26 November in the same year the trial edition was released.

=== Fan disc ===
Due to the popularity of the eroge, a fan disc of Osananajimi wa Daitouryou: My girlfriend is the President published by Alcot, was officially released in Japan on 13 August 2010. Like the original game, the visual novel contains H-scenes suitable for ages over 18. The game also includes the addition of other date-able characters, aside from Yukino, Irina, Ell and Ran.

== Music ==
Nakayama Mato provides all of the lyrics arrangements for the following songs. The opening theme to Osananajimi wa Daitouryou: My girlfriend is the President is Rocket Love Panic sung by Marie, and its ending song is Encore also sung by Marie. The visual novel contains two image songs, LOVE Complex (Yukino and Irina's image song) and Family Bond (Ell and Ran's image song). My Girlfriend is the President's fan disc opening theme is Dramatic Parade sung by Aya Tachibana. The five main characters have background music leitmotifs, Yukino's theme is 'Osananajimi wa Daitouryou', Irina's theme is 'Rusia Yori Ai wo Komete', Ell's theme is 'Hoshizora Kara Kita Shoujo', Ran's theme is 'Antatchabururedi', and Jun's theme is 'Hondou Junichiro no Theme'.
