= Akabeisoft2 =

Japanese video game developer

- Type: Kabushiki gaisha
- Industry: Computer games
- Founded: 2005; 21 years ago
- Headquarters: Japan
- Products: Visual novels
- Website: http://www.akabeesoft2.com/

Akabeisoft2 (あかべぇそふとつぅ, Akabēsofutotsū) is a Japanese adult visual novel producing company, emerged from the former doujin circle Akabei Soft. Some of Akabeisoft2's games have had consumer port releases. For example, 5pb. released W.L.O. Sekai Renai Kikō to the Xbox 360 and Yeti brought Tamayura onto the PlayStation 2 and is no longer porting Sharin no Kuni, Himawari no Shōjo.

Akabeisoft2's G Senjō no Maō was very well received and was awarded the Bishōjo Game Award gold prize in the scenario and graphic categories in addition to the grand prize in 2008. W.L.O. Sekai Renai Kikō was awarded the Moe Game Award silver prize in the character designer category in 2009.

== Brands ==
- Akabeisoft3
- Cosmic Cute
- Effordom Soft
- Applique
- Akatsuki Works

== Former brands ==
- Akabeisoft2 TRY
- Applique Sister (all members joined Akabeisoft3)
- Akatsuki Works Black (all members joined Akabeisoft3)
- Shallot (all members joined Akabeisoft3)
- Spermaniax (all members joined Akabeisoft3)
- Syangrila (all members joined Akabeisoft3)
- Syangrila Smart (all members joined Akabeisoft3)
- Team It's (all members joined Akabeisoft3)
- Wheel

== Games ==
- Tamayura, 2005
- Sharin no Kuni: The Girl Among the Sunflowers, 2005
- Tamayura: Ryoujoku Side, 2006
- Sono Yokogao wo Mitsumete Shimau: A Profile Kanzenban, 2006 (remade version of Akabeisoft's A Profile)
- Konna Ko ga Itara, Boku wa Mou...!!, 2006
- Sharin no Kuni, Yūkyū no Shōnenshōjo, 2007
- The Devil on G-String, 2008
- Konboku Mahjong: Konna Mahjong ga Attara Boku wa Ron!, 2008
- W.L.O. Sekai Renai Kikō, 2009
- Okiba ga Nai!, 2010
- Kōrin no Machi, Lavender no Shōjo, 2010
- Oresama no RagnaRock, 2010 (developed by Akabeisoft2 TRY)
- Yaya, Okiba ga nai!, 2011
