= Clover Heart's =

- Cover to the PS2 Clover Heart's: Looking for Happiness limited edition version featuring Rea and Rio Mikoshiba.
- Developer(s): ALcot; HuneX (PS2); Dennō Club (DVD game)
- Publisher(s): ALcot (PC); Interchannel (PS2)
- Platform(s): Windows, PlayStation 2, DVD player game
- Release: ^{JP} November 28, 2003 (Windows)^{JP} August 26, 2004 (PS2)
- Genre(s): Eroge, Visual novel
- Mode(s): Single player

Screenshot of what average conversation looks like in Clover Heart's. Pictured are Rio Mikoshiba and Rin Asuka. Note that the conversation text "え......" appears by Rio, instead of in a more orthodox message window.

Clover Heart's is an adult visual novel developed by ALcot.

== Characters ==
Hakuto Nagumo (南雲 白兎, Nagumo Hakuto)
Voiced by: Ryōko Tanaka
Itsuki Nagumo (南雲 夷月, Nagumo Itsuki)
Voiced by: Aoi Kisaragi
Rea Mikoshiba (御子柴 玲亜, Mikoshiba Rea)
Voiced by: Kana Fumiduki
Rio Mikoshiba (御子柴 莉織, Mikoshiba Rio)
Voiced by: Suzune Kusunoki
Chimari Komamiya (駒宮 ちまり, Komamiya Chimari)
Voiced by: Mahiru Kaneda
Madoka Sakaki (榊 円華, Sakaki Madoka)
Voiced by: "Yuki"
Kenji Sakaki (榊 賢治, Sakaki Kenji)
Voiced by: Tsukasa Madera
Yūki Hayama (葉山 雄基, Hayama Yūki)
Rin Asuka (飛鳥 凛, Asuka Rin)
Kuon Nogisaka (乃木坂 久遠, Nogisaka Kuon)
Robert Ichimonji (ロベルト＝イチモンジ)
Voiced by: Ayumu Nakazawa
Saionji-sensei (西園寺 先生)
Airi Momose (桃瀬 愛理, Momose Airi)
The PS2 exclusive character.
Voiced by: Mia Naruse

== Releases ==
Clover Heart's was first released for PC on four CDs on November 28, 2003. On June 25, 2004, a DVD edition of the game was released.

The game was ported to the PlayStation 2 as Clover Heart's: Looking for Happiness. The PS2 version has the pornographic elements removed, but features the new character Airi Momose. Looking for Happiness was released in three versions: a limited edition, standard edition, and Best version (budget release). The limited edition came with a bonus drama CD.

Lastly, it was ported as a DVD TV game on January 26, 2006.
