= Sharin no Kuni: The Girl Among the Sunflowers =

2005 video game

- Japanese cover art
- Developer: Akabeisoft2
- Publishers: JP: Akabeisoft2, 5pb.; WW: Front Wing
- Artist: Alpha
- Writer: Loose Boy
- Platforms: Microsoft Windows, PlayStation Portable, Xbox 360, PlayStation 3
- Release: Microsoft Windows: JP: November 25, 2005; WW: TBA; Xbox 360: JP: October 28, 2010; PlayStation Portable: JP: February 23, 2012; PlayStation 3: JP: February 28, 2013
- Genre: Visual novel
- Mode: Single-player

Sharin no Kuni: The Girl Among the Sunflowers (Note: Known in Japan as Sharin no Kuni, Himawari no Shōjo (車輪の国、向日葵の少女; "Wheel Country, Sunflower Girl")) is a visual novel video game, developed by Akabeisoft2 for Microsoft Windows in November 2005 in Japan; it was later released by 5pb. for Xbox 360, PlayStation Portable and PlayStation 3 in Japan, and is planned for release in the West by Front Wing for Microsoft Windows. A PlayStation Vita version was also in development by Front Wing but was later cancelled after multiple delays. The player takes the role of Kenichi Morita, a young man who has been training for seven years to become a "Special High Class Individual" – an elite class of people possessing complete legal authority – and travels to a farming town to rehabilitate three students and prepare them to re-enter society.

The game was written by Loose Boy, with character art by Alpha. They also created the fan disc Sharin no Kuni, Yūkyū no Shōnenshōjo (Note: Sharin no Kuni, Yūkyū no Shōnenshōjo (車輪の国、悠久の少年少女; lit. "Wheel Country, Eternal Boys and Girls")) (2007), and a manga adaptation by Usami Wataru was published from 2008 to 2011.

== Synopsis ==
=== Setting ===
Sharin no Kuni is a visual novel set in an isolated farming town in an unnamed country, referred to as the "wheel country", and was prior to the events of the story the origin of a civil uprising, which was suppressed by the government. Although nominally democratic, all aspects of society in this country are influenced by an elite stratum of people known as "Special High Class Individuals" (SHCI). These individuals possess complete legal authority, using this to confer "obligations" – rules which if disobeyed result in confinement in a forced-labor camp – upon those whose actions are deemed detrimental to society. The wheel country borders the poverty-stricken and war-torn "southern country", whose inhabitants often are discriminated against in the north.

=== Plot ===
The player takes the role of Kenichi Morita, a young man who has been training for the past seven years to become an SHCI. For his final examination, he has been dispatched to the same town in which he lived as a child, with the objective to pose as a student in the town's school and rehabilitate three students who possess "obligations" to prepare them to re-enter society.

== Development and release ==
The game was developed by Akabeisoft2 and written by Loose Boy, and features character art by Alpha. Akabeisoft2 originally released the game for Microsoft Windows on November 25, 2005 in Japan, and it was later released by 5pb. for other systems: Xbox 360 on October 28, 2010, PlayStation Portable on February 23, 2012, and PlayStation 3 on February 28, 2013. A Western release is planned for Microsoft Windows and PlayStation Vita, by the video game developer Front Wing; they will also make a patch available for the Microsoft Windows version that adds "18+" content to the game. The PlayStation Vita version will be distributed physically by Eastasiasoft and digitally through the PlayStation Store; it was originally intended to be distributed by Limited Run Games, but plans had to be changed as PlayStation Vita cart production had ended in North America before the game was ready for release.

The PlayStation Vita version of the game was ultimately cancelled on February 15, 2021. The announcement was made through a Backers Only update on the Kickstarter page but was shared by backers elsewhere

Other media based on the game has been released: a fan disc, Sharin no Kuni, Yūkyū no Shōnenshōjo, was published in January 2007, and was later bundled with the PlayStation Portable release of the original game. A manga adaptation of the original game was created by Usami Wataru and serialized in Dengeki Daioh from 2008 to 2011, and later published in three collected volumes by Kadokawa Corporation.

=== Localization ===
In April 2016, Front Wing announced that they would localize and publish the game for the West under the title Wheel Country, Sunflower Girl: Sharin no Kuni, using a crowdfunding campaign to finance the release. The campaign launched in June 2016, but had troubles meeting its goal of US$140,000; Tokyo Otaku Mode, the company in charge of managing the campaign, added new lower-priced tiers for people to contribute through, but suspended the campaign in July 2016, with 39% of the goal funded and only eight days remaining of the campaign, as they considered it unlikely to succeed at that point. They planned a re-launch of the campaign, with improved communication and promotion and re-planned campaign goals and reward tiers; initially planned for re-launch in August, the new campaign started on November 21, 2016, with a goal of US$80,000, and with the game's localized title changed to Sharin no Kuni: The Girl Among the Sunflowers. This incarnation of the campaign fared better, reaching US$60,000 within the first few days, and the goal of US$80,000 on December 2. The campaign also reached two "stretch goals" on top of the original goal: one of US$120,000, allowing the development of a PlayStation Vita version, and one of US$145,000, allowing for the inclusion of the Yūkyū no Shōnenshōjo fan disc in the localization.

== Reception ==
Reception

Review score
Publication	Score
Famitsu	32/40

In their cross-review, Famitsu's writers said that they enjoyed the game, and praised it for its scenario and characters; one of them said that the female character designs, while attractive, felt dated. In February 2010, the game was the tenth best selling title on the web store ErogeShop.
