= Kira Inugami =

Japanese manga artist

Kira Inugami (狗神 煌, Inugami Kira) is a Japanese manga artist. She often participates in cosplaying events. Some of Kira Inugami's body pillows are sold online in Japan.

== Works illustrated ==
- H_{2}O: Footprints in the Sand artbook & manga
- √after and another artbook
- Ebiten: Kōritsu Ebisugawa Kōkō Tenmonbu
- Seitokai no Ichizon
