= H2O: Footprints in the Sand =

Japanese adult visual novel

- H_{2}O: Footprints in the Sand
- H_{2}O original visual novel cover. Depicted are the three heroines (from left to right): Hinata, Hayami, and Otoha.
- Video game
- Developer: Makura
- Publisher: Makura (PC); Kadokawa Shoten, Regista (PS2)
- Genre: Eroge, Visual novel
- Platform: Windows, PlayStation 2
- Released: June 23, 2006 (Windows); April 24, 2008 (PS2)
- Manga
- Written by: Makura
- Illustrated by: Kira Inugami
- Published by: Kadokawa Shoten
- Magazine: Comp Ace
- Original run: January 26, 2007 – February 26, 2008
- Volumes: 2
- Anime television series
- Directed by: Hideki Tachibana
- Produced by: Tomoko Kawasaki; Tsuneo Takechi; Seiichi Hachiya; Makoto Chiba; Tomoko Suzuki; Ryōsuke Hiramitsu; Yuka Harada
- Written by: Jukki Hanada
- Music by: Junpei Fujita
- Studio: Zexcs
- Original network: Fukui TV
- Original run: January 4, 2008 – March 21, 2008
- Episodes: 12
- Sequel
- Root After and Another

H_{2}O: Footprints in the Sand is a Japanese adult visual novel by Makura that was released on June 23, 2006, for Windows as a DVD; a version playable on the PlayStation 2 under the title H_{2}O + followed on April 24, 2008, with adult content removed and added scenarios and graphics not seen in the original release. H_{2}O is Makura's first game; a sequel named Root After and Another was later produced in October 2007. The gameplay in H_{2}O follows a plot line that offers predetermined scenarios with courses of interaction, and focuses on the appeal of the three female main characters. There are two modes of gameplay, the Blindness Effect and Normal Effect, where the former plays on the fact that the protagonist is blind, and the latter mode removes the added element of gameplay the Blindness Effect has. The story is broken into three parts: the original introduction and meeting, following by a separation and reunion, and finally ending with the protagonist choosing one of the girls and spending the rest of the game with her.

A manga adaptation, drawn by Kira Inugami, was serialized in Kadokawa Shoten's Comp Ace between 2007 and 2008. A 12-episode anime by the animation studio Zexcs aired in Japan between January and March 2008 on the Fukui TV television network. Several music albums have also been released. The name H_{2}O comes from the first letter of the three main heroines: Hayami, Hinata, and Otoha. Footprints in the Sand comes from a poem; the first part of this poem appeared in episode one of the anime and the second half in the final episode.

== Gameplay ==
An example of what average conversation looks like in H_{2}O. Here, Takuma is talking with Otoha.

The gameplay requires almost no interaction from the protagonist as the entire duration of the game is spent on simply reading the text that will appear on the screen. There are three main plot lines that the player will have the chance to experience, one for each of the heroines in the story. When the person plays the game for the first time, only Hayami's plot line is available. After finishing it once, the option to choose Hinata's plot line becomes available at the decision point in the early part of the game. The protagonist must replay the game several times to view all three plot lines in their entirety.

The game can be played in two modes, a Blindness Effect Mode or a Normal Effect Mode. The former takes into account that the protagonist is blind. Although the protagonist can imagine what the people he talks with look like, he cannot discern the color of the world around him, which renders the artwork in an almost black and white tone, giving it a stylish and dream-like appearance as well. As gameplay progresses and the protagonist's condition gradually heals, this convention eventually fades away as the protagonist can now see with his own eyes the world around him. The Normal Effect Mode does not use the effect from the Blindness Effect Mode and therefore the visuals are otherwise unchanged from their originally-colored state. The two modes can be changed at any time throughout the gameplay.

There are three parts in the gameplay. The first part, entitled the "Past Chapter" (過去編, Kako-hen) serves to set up the story and for the protagonist to meet and get to know the characters, especially the three heroines. Following the first part, there is a time where the protagonist must leave for several years only to come back in the so-called "Reunion Chapter" (再会編, Saikai-hen) and meet the girls he knew before who have changed somewhat. After the player chooses one of the girls, the third part in the story called the "After Game" (アトゲー, Atoge) ends the game, which is also where most erotic contents are viewable. The story consists primarily of the first two parts, which are a flashback from the protagonist's point of view.

== Plot ==
H2O revolves around Takuma Hirose, a blind young male junior-high school student, though the cause for his blindness is undetermined. After his mother died unexpectedly, it left a deep emotional scar on him, which caused him to become very lonely and reserved. Due to this, Takuma and his uncle move from the city out into a rural area and Takuma is enrolled into a new junior school. At his new school, he meets several new girls, though three of whom he gets to know the most out of anyone else; the firm and obstinate Hayami Kohinata, kind Hinata Kagura, as well as cheerful and mysterious Otoha. As Takuma interacts with these girls, his medical condition gradually begins to heal and he is completely recovered.

== Characters ==
Takuma Hirose (弘瀬 琢磨, Hirose Takuma)
Voiced by: Ami Koshimizu
Takuma is the quiet main protagonist of the series. Due to being blind, he carries around a white cane named "Tomoda Chisa" (友田千紗), a pun on the word Tomodachi (友達; lit. 'friend'). His mother committed suicide, leaving deep emotional scar on Takuma. Wanting to rectify this, he moves to the countryside to live with his uncle Teruo Hozumi (穂積 輝夫, Hozumi Teruo). Takuma is naturally friendly and likes to befriend everyone he meets in his new town. His mind reverts to that of a child after Hayami's family killed his mom. He recovers slowly under Hayami's care, due to his delusion causing him to view her as his mother. He later fully recovers and even regains his eyesight after coming to terms with his mother’s death.
Hayami Kohinata (小日向 はやみ, Kohinata Hayami)
Voiced by: Harumi Sakurai
Hayami is Takuma's female classmate from a rich family of doctors who sits next to him. She is anti-social and possesses a sharp attitude towards others, refusing to befriend them due to her accepting her own status as an outcast. Since her family charged high prices in medical examinations and refused to take any patients in without the fees, the villagers revolted against them, burned their house, kicked them out of the village except Hayami. Due to this, she is often referred to by her classmates as the "cockroach" (ゴキブリ, gokiburi), but does not fight back when being bullied. Without a home, Hayami is poor and lives alone in an abandoned trolley on the outskirts of town, which was eventually burned down by the other adults out of hatred and later on moves in with Takuma and his uncle.
Hinata Kagura (神楽 ひなた, Kagura Hinata)
Voiced by: Ryōko Tanaka
Hinata is the granddaughter of the village headman and one of the rich members of town. She is Takuma's classmate who serves as student council president in their class. Hinata is kind yet clumsy and tends to fall down, as she even fell down a flight of stairs at school, but Takuma was there to save her. Her real name is Hotaru Kagura (神楽 ほたる, Kagura Hotaru), the younger sister of Hinata.
Otoha (音羽)
Voiced by: Mia Naruse
Otoha is a spirit who can only be heard and seen by Takuma. She is always cheerful and will appear out of nowhere, clinging suddenly to him. Later stories reveal that Otoha is the real Hinata Kagura, who fell into a river and drowned. She took the name Otoha from Hotaru's picture book that she drew herself. Before disappearing, Otoha shows Takuma a strange world, where she is his fiancée. Just before she disappears, Otoha confesses her love for him, but says that she is not the one he belongs with. Otoha eventually gets reincarnated as a five-year-old girl.
Yui Tabata (田端 ゆい, Tabata Yui)
Voiced by: Mio Yasuda
One of Takuma's female friends, Yui comes from a rich background and uses formal speech to distinguish herself from the "commoners". She has a self-aggrandizing personality and always has two male henchmen tagging along. Yui is very proud and condescending, but that does not actually mean she is unfriendly to others. Yui gets along quite well with everyone except Hayami.
Hamaji Yakumo (八雲 はまじ, Yakumo Hamaji)
Voiced by: Yui Sakakibara
Hamaji is Takuma's optimistic classmate. Despite his feminine appearance and voice, he is actually a boy who crossdresses as a girl. His family owns a convenience store. Hamaji seems to be bisexual as he flirts with Takuma occasionally, but eventually marries his best friend Maki Kumon (久門 真紀, Kumon Maki).
Rin Misakura (御桜 稟, Misakura Rin)
Voiced by: Rui Takagi
The main protagonist in Sakura no Uta, Rin is an exchange student from the city who is gentle and hard-working, but can be rather clumsy.

== Development and release ==
H_{2}O: Footprints in the Sand was released as an adult game for the PC on June 23, 2006; an artbook came bundled with the game. A version for the PlayStation 2 entitled H_{2}O + with adult content removed was released on April 24, 2008, by Kadokawa Shoten. The PS2 version contains new computer graphics and scenarios not seen in the original release.

== Related media ==
=== Manga ===
A manga adaptation illustrated by Kira Inugami was serialized in Kadokawa Shoten's magazine Comp Ace between January 26, 2007, and February 26, 2008. Two tankōbon volumes were released: the first on December 26, 2007, and the second on March 26, 2008.

=== Anime ===
A 12-episode anime adaptation produced by Zexcs, directed by Hideki Tachibana, and written by Jukki Hanada aired in Japan between January 4 and March 21, 2008, on the Fukui TV television network. A preview video was streamed on Kadokawa Shoten's official website for their magazine Newtype on December 19, 2007. The video most notably contains an English narration, which is rare for Japanese trailers. The first episode of the series was previewed on December 23, 2007, in Akihabara, Japan, and the final episode was previewed on March 20, 2008, in Machida, Japan. The first episode opens with a partial recitation of the poem "Footprints", and the end of the poem is recited in the second half of the final episode. The anime was licensed for release in English by Kadokawa USA, but its Kadokawa Pictures USA subsidiary later closed down, thus canceling the release.

No.	Title	Original release date
1	"Takuma" (Japanese: 琢磨)	January 4, 2008
Takuma Hirose, a blind junior high school student, moves from the city to a rural area to live with his uncle to help relieve him of his blindness. On his first day of school, he befriends other classmates, but discovers that the girl he sits next to in class, Hayami Kohinata, is subject to constant bullying by a few of her classmates. Takuma tries to protect Hayami in any way he can, but since cannot do much for her since he is blind. which she herself reminds him of. Otoha, a spirit only Takuma can see, gives him the temporary ability to see. He later meets Hayami on the hill with his eyesight healed.
2	"Hayami" (Japanese: はやみ)	January 11, 2008
Takuma is shown around town by Hinata and two of her friends. When they come across a suspension bridge, Takuma is told that a monster lives on the other side and that he should never cross it. Despite the warning, Takuma does so anyway and finds a naked Hayami washing in a waterfall. She later brings him to her home, which consists of two old ropeway gondolas. He soon discovers her poor lifestyle but tries to help her out. Takuma protects Hayami from being beaten up at school the next day, which Hinata intervenes, ending the fight and protecting both of them. A flashback where Hinata befriends Hayami is shown, but there was a fire after their meeting and Hinata stopped their friendship. After the fight, Takuma follows Hayami to her house where she teaches him how to build a toy windmill.
3	"Hinata" (Japanese: ひなた)	January 18, 2008
After the events of the previous night, Hinata meets Takuma so they can walk to school together. On the way, they run into Hayami who had been waiting for him. She tries to take Takuma herself, but Hinata opposes, leading to the three going to school together. At school, Takuma's class has to sketch outside for the day, during which Hinata refers to Takuma as the "Destined One" while feeding him an omelet she made. Takuma later discovers that Hinata was once Hayami's good friend, but when he tries to ask Hinata why she acts so distant now, Hinata does not tell him. However, a flashback is shown that explains that she was a daughter of an important villager while Hayami was a commoner and Hinata's Grandfather discouraged their friendship. Takuma tries to take Hinata to see Hayami, but when they get to the bridge, Hinata kisses Takuma as Hayami looks on.
4	"Hamaji" (Japanese: はまじ)	January 25, 2008
Takuma, Hinata, Yui, Hamaji, and Maki go to the beach together to have fun before Hamaji's younger sister Yukiji shows up and tries to take Hamaji back home. They agree to let her stay, but Yukiji attempts to hurt Takuma or otherwise separate him from the others due to her love for Hamaji. As Yukiji is confronted by the others about Takuma, she runs away and swims in the sea. Takuma tries to save Yukiji when her leg cramps, only to get drowned. Hamaji has to use CPR to revive Takuma, who is strangely in slow motion. Yukiji thanks him for saving her while he was florid with Hamaji's CPR. While taking a bath, Takuma finally realizes that Hamaji is actually male. Hayami goes to the beach to show Takuma his true feelings, but they get interrupted by Hinata.
5	"Kagura" (Japanese: 神楽)	February 1, 2008
After the events of the beach trip, Hayami starts to ignore Takuma at school, and Hinata continuously presses Takuma to come along with her. Takuma asks Hamaji about what happened between Hinata and Hayami, to which he tells him the whole story. Hinata and Hayami had once been good friends until the other villagers burned Hayami's house to the ground and severed the ties between the two girls. Takuma visits Hinata's home and drags her over to when Hayami lives across the bridge. Hinata becomes upset about how she has treated Hayami in the past and apologizes to her in tears, resulting in the reconciled friendship.
6	"Yui" (Japanese: ゆい)	February 8, 2008
Hinata continues to hang out with Hayami and still wants to befriend her, but the other members of the class are confused on the whole situation since Hinata makes things complicated ith her being a member of the Kagura family. Even worse, Yui still hates Hayami due to Hayami's family abusing their power in the town many years ago, which indirectly caused the death of Yui's grandfather due to sickness. When Yui, Hamaji, and Maki go to town, they run into Takuma, Hinata, and Hayami. While shopping for clothes together, Yui suddenly gets frustrated by the situation and leaves. She drops her wallet, leading her to go through the mountains to get back into town. Hayami goes to look for her alone since she knows the mountain area well, and the two meet at the ruins of Hayami's former home. Otoha makes a vision of Hayami with her family eating sweet omelette, Hayami's favorite food, to Yui. The next day at school, Yui starts to show a little compassion for Hayami.
7	"Hotaru" (Japanese: ほたる)	February 15, 2008
Hinata reveals her real name as Hotaru and after her older sister Hinata died many years ago, the Kagura family decided to tell the village that Hotaru had actually died, thus Hotaru took Hinata's place. Hotaru does not want to do this anymore, but her grandfather gets furious at her for trying to revert to being Hotaru again after so many years. Hotaru's grandfather discourages her from going outside the house for the time being, not even for school. During this time, Hotaru thinks of the past when she was with Hinata. After Hinata receives some class notes from school from her friends, reads some they attached, and finally decides to go to school the following day, she tells everyone that her name is actually Hotaru. Her friends quickly adapt to the change and call her "Hotaru" now.
8	"Otoha" (Japanese: 音羽)	February 22, 2008
Otoha uses her spiritual powers to have Takuma experience an unfamiliar world containing the same people in the same place, but all of them have changed. Hayami and Hotaru are living with Takuma as younger sisters not related by blood, Hamaji is Takuma's childhood friend, Yui is an evil magical girl, and Otoha can come to school with everyone as Takuma's fiancée. Otoha tells Takuma how he has to take charge in order for the world to correct itself, but it tires him out to constantly be correcting others regarding their strange behaviors. Otoha splits with Takuma and bids him goodbye as she disappears before him.
9	"Hozumi" (Japanese: 穂積)	February 29, 2008
With the Summer Festival approaching, the villagers are starting to bring out decorations covered in bells, which makes Takuma remember about his late mother's bell. Takuma takes the bell to school, but does not know that there is a tradition in the village for a boy to give a bell to a girl he likes before the summer festival, leading to a few misunderstandings. At night, Hayami presses him to tell her more about his mother, to which he openly tells her that she committed suicide. At night of the festival, Hayami meets Takuma on a hill overlooking the village and he confesses his love for her. Hayami accepts him and they kiss in the moonlight.
10	"Kohinata" (Japanese: 小日向)	March 7, 2008
After Takuma and Hayami become a couple, Takuma starts getting hounded by his friends at school for the details for the summer festival. They are told by Hotaru's grandfather that Hayami's family drove Takuma's mother to commit suicide, which is later confirmed by Takuma's uncle. Amidst this revelation, Takuma realizes that his vision is starting to blur again. During a typhoon one day, Takuma reveals his frustration to Hayami, causing her to run outside. She makes it to the bridge with sandbags pilled across it to prevent a flood and starts attacking it with a sign. Two guys from her class, who had previously punched Hayami, find her doing this and start beating her up again.
11	"Hirose" (Japanese: 弘瀬)	March 14, 2008
Hayami eventually escapes being punched with Yui's intervention and meets Takuma, who went searching for her. She confronts Takuma on his past, urging him to vent his anger, only for them to get conscious. Having lost his vision due to his refusal to forgive and forget, Takuma wakes up, learning that he might be unable to see again. Takuma becomes introverted, believing everything he experienced was an illusion. Hayami decides to leave the village, but is stopped by the village elder and two others, who intend to kill her. After a brief conversation, Hotaru's grandfather fired a shot towards Hayami.
12	"H_{2}O"	March 21, 2008
Takuma and Hayami are saved from the village elder's wrath when Hotaru arrives with the police. Takuma's mentality has experienced a drastic change, shifting to a childish state, with the belief that Hayami is his mother. He is sent to Tokyo for further treatment and is accompanied by Hayami. Life goes well for the two, but Takuma still recalls Hayami to a certain extent. Later, Hayami leaves Takuma's side to help a child on the railroad tracks, leading him to remember that his mother had never committed suicide, but had attempted to save a life as well. Realizing this, he regains his sight and mentality, but cannot stop Hayami from crossing in front of an oncoming train. Years passed, Takuma returns to the village. After building a windmill on the same hill where Takuma met Hayami, he thinks of her and encounters a younger Otoha at the age when she died, who mentions something about convincing the Spirit Committee. As Otoha leaves, Takuma sees Hayami walking up the hill with the bell he gave her on a neckband around her neck and realizes that she was brought back to life. With that, Takuma and Hayami were together again.

=== Music ===
The game's opening theme is "H_{2}O" and the ending theme is "Tomorrow", both sung by Monet. The maxi singles for the opening and ending themes were released at Comiket 70 on August 12, 2006. Two more theme songs used in the game were "Dream" and "Footprints in the Sand", also both sung by Monet. A character song album for Otoha entitled Otoha's Ghostly Bon Festival Dance (音羽の死霊の盆踊り, Otoha no Shirei no Bon Odori), sung by Mia Naruse, was released on October 22, 2006, at the DreamParty Tokyo convention. An arrange maxi single titled H_{2}O: Prelude containing arranged versions of "H_{2}O" and "Tomorrow", was released on December 21, 2007. The game's original soundtrack came bundled with the original game as a pre-order bonus. The opening theme for the anime version is "One-winged Icarus" (片翼のイカロス, Katayoku no Ikarosu) by Yui Sakakibara and the maxi single was released on January 25, 2008. The ending theme for the anime is "Kazahane" (カザハネ) by Haruka Shimotsuki and the single was released on February 22, 2008. "Footprints in the Sand" by Monet is the ending theme in the anime's final episode.

== Reception ==
Across the national ranking of bishōjo games in amount sold in Japan, H_{2}O debuted second and ranked in again the following ranking at number thirteen. H_{2}O was the second highest selling game for the month of June 2006 on Getchu.com, just behind Summer Days, and for the first half of 2006 was the fourteenth highest selling game on the same website. H_{2}O dropped to the twenty-fifth highest selling game on Getchu.com for the entire year of 2006.
