= Sakura no Uta =

2015 video game

- Logo
- Developer: Makura
- Publishers: JP: Makura; WW: Shiravune
- Director: SCA-DI
- Producer: SCA-DI
- Artists: Kira Inugami; Motoyon; Kagome; SCA-DI
- Writer: SCA-DI
- Composers: Matsumoto Fuminori; ryo; Pixelbee; Blasterhead
- Platform: Windows
- Release: JP: October 23, 2015; WW: TBA
- Genres: Eroge, Visual novel

Sakura no Uta: Sakura no Mori no Ue o Mau (サクラノ詩－櫻の森の上を舞う－) is a Japanese adult visual novel developed by Makura and released on October 23, 2015 for Windows. It is Makura's third game after H_{2}O: Footprints in the Sand and Root After and Another. The plot explores topics related to art and aesthetics, such as aestheticism, mimesis and the nature of artistic genius, incorporating references to literary figures such as Oscar Wilde and Kenji Miyazawa.

== Gameplay ==
The gameplay requires almost no interaction from the player as nearly the entire duration of the game is spent on simply reading the text that will appear on the screen; this text represents either dialogue between the various characters, or the inner thoughts of the protagonist. There is a single choice that the player gets to make which determines which girl the protagonist chooses. There are six main plot lines that the player will have the chance to experience, one for each of the heroines in the story. In order to view the six plot lines to their entirety, the player will have to replay the game multiple times and choose a different choice at the single decision point in order to further the plot in an alternate direction. A true ending will be available after the completion of the stories of all the heroines.

== Plot ==
Naoya Kusanagi lost his mother when he was a child. Naoya's father, who is a famous artist, is the only person that can help him cope with the loss of his friend Rin Misakura, who moved away while they were in elementary school. 6 years later, Naoya's father died. After the funeral ends, Naoya is taken into the custody of The Natsume family in exchange for cooking meals at their home, and Rin is transferred back to Naoya's class.

== Characters ==
Naoya Kusanagi (草薙 直哉, Kusanagi Naoya)
Naoya is the main protagonist of the story. He moved into the Natsume household after his father died. He cooks for the Natsume family since neither Ai, Kei, nor Shizuku can cook decent meals.
Rin Misakura (御桜 稟, Misakura Rin)
Rin is Naoya's childhood friend, and is quite clumsy. She moved to the countryside, but then moved back, transferring to Naoya's class. She refers to Naoya as "Kusanagi-kun", but used to call him "Nao-kun" before she moved back.
Shizuku Natsume (夏目 雫, Natsume Shizuku)
Shizuku is Ai's and Kei's younger sister; she rarely smiles. She is currently working as a model.
Yūmi Kawachino (川内野 優美, Kawachino Yūmi)
Yūmi is an underclassman to Naoya. She is a neat freak.
Ai Natsume (夏目 藍, Natsume Ai)
Ai is Kei's and Shizuku's older sister, and Naoya's homeroom teacher. She is popular among the students, and is very short despite being twenty-four years old. After Naoya's father died, she invited him to live with her family.
Makoto Toritani (鳥谷 真琴, Toritani Makoto)
Makoto is the president of the school's art club; she is a very bossy person.
Rina Hikawa (氷川 里奈, Hikawa Rina)
Rina is an underclassman to Naoya. After Rin moved away, Naoya began to play with her. She looks up to Naoya as her big brother.
Kei Natsume (夏目 圭, Natsume Kei)
Kei is Ai's and Shizuku's brother, and also Naoya's good friend.
Kuriyama Natsuko (栗山 奈津子, Natsuko Kuriyama)

== Development ==
Originally titled Sakura no Uta (サクラノ詩): The tear flows because of tenderness., it was announced as the debut title for Japanese developer Makura in 2004. A manga adaptation illustrated by Hakone Odawara was serialized in Kadokawa Shoten's manga magazine Comp Ace between March 26, 2005 and March 26, 2006; the chapters were later collected into a single tankōbon volume released on June 7, 2006.

According to brand representative SCA-DI, Makura was originally conceived as a separate entity from KeroQ where they could release titles "that SCA-DI couldn't write", and they planned their first work to depict ordinary schooldays. However, the original script for Sakura no Uta became depressing in tone, so it was scrapped and they released H_{2}O: Footprints in the Sand first, which was being developed simultaneously. Afterward, development of Sakura no Uta restarted, this time with SCA-DI writing the script. The third chapter, "PicaPica", was written by Ei Asou.

A trial version called Sakura no Uta ~Haru no Yuki~ (サクラノ詩 ～春ノ雪～) was released on September 6, 2008 as a pre-order bonus for Supreme Candy ~Oudou ni wa Oudoutaru Riyuu ga Arun Desu!~, containing the first chapter of the title. It was later rereleased as a bonus for the June 2014 issue of Tech Gian and the Official Visual Archive. However, the final product and its respective trial version were highly different from this "prototype," with changes ranging from the characters to the setting, and the graphics being redrawn.

SCA-DI announced that he is working on a sequel titled Sakura no Toki: Sakura no Mori no Shita o Ayumu (サクラノ刻 -櫻の森の下を歩む-), and a teaser website was made public on July 28, 2017.

In responding to a Reddit AMA concerning the then to-be released English localization of Wonderful Everyday, SCA-DI stated that he would be "especially happy" if a localization for Sakura no Uta and Sakura to Toki were to be released.

Localizations of Sakura no Uta have been announced in both English and Chinese.

== Reception ==
Sakura no Uta won the grand prize in the overall category of the Moe Game Awards 2015, the gold prize in the Users' Pick category, and the first place in the October monthly award. It also achieved first place in the overall, scenario, and music categories of the 2015 PC game rankings on Getchu.com. Additionally, characters Ai Natsume and Shizuku Natsume were voted second and nineteenth respectively, and the opening movie achieved second place.
