= Ebiten: Kōritsu Ebisugawa Kōkō Tenmonbu =

Japanese manga series

- Ebiten

公立海老栖川高校天悶部 (Kōritsu Ebisugawa Kōkō Tenmonbu)
- Genre: Comedy, Parody, Harem
- Manga
- Written by: SCA-ji
- Illustrated by: Kira Inugami
- Published by: Kadokawa Shoten
- Magazine: Comp Ace
- Original run: December 2008 – February 2013
- Volumes: 4
- Original net animation
- Directed by: Hideki Okamoto
- Produced by: Satoshi Fujita; Seiichi Hachiya; Jun Fukuda; Bunpei Ogawa; Atsuyuki Okamoto; Fumihiko Shinozaki; Yoshihisa Tsuda; Hitomi Nishioka
- Written by: Yūko Kakihara
- Music by: Yūichi Nonaka
- Studio: AIC Classic
- Licensed by: NA: Sentai Filmworks
- Released: July 14, 2012 – September 15, 2012
- Episodes: 10 + OVA

Kōritsu Ebisugawa Kōkō Tenmonbu (公立海老栖川高校天悶部; lit. "Ebisugawa Public High School Astronomy Club"), often shortened to Ebiten (えびてん), is a Japanese comedy manga series by Kira Inugami and SCA-ji, serialized in Kadokawa Shoten's Comp Ace magazine. Three volumes have been released as of June 2012. A 10-episode original net animation adaptation by AIC ran on niconico between July and September, 2012. Following the ONA series, an OVA episode was bundled with the fourth volume of the manga, released in December 2012. The series has been licensed by Sentai Filmworks in North America.

== Plot ==
Itsuki Noya is a new student at Ebisugawa High School who joins his school's astronomy club only to discover that its club room is in the basement for some reason. What he finds inside is that the club is filled with weirdos who all happen to be girls.

== Characters ==
Itsuki Noya (野矢 一樹, Noya Itsuki)
Voiced by: Mamiko Noto (drama CD), Mariya Ise (anime)
A young boy who is the male heir of the Noya Group. Upon joining the Astronomical Club under the assumption it was the Astronomy Club, he is forced to crossdress, as Kyoko only wanted girls to join.
Kyōko Todayama (戸田山 響子, Todayama Kyōko)
Voiced by: Ami Koshimizu (drama CD), Kana Asumi (anime)
The Astronomical Club's delusional president who has a wild personality and is constantly harassing Hakata.
Izumiko Todayama (戸田山 泉子, Todayama Izumiko)
Voiced by: Emiri Katō (drama CD), Iori Nomizu (anime)
Kyoko's younger sister and Itsuki's personal maid, who is constantly treating him as her toy, forcing him to call her Elizabeth Margaret. Not willing to relinquish Itsuki to Kyoko, she transfers schools and joins the Astronomical Club. Although she treats Noya as her toy, she appears to have genuine feelings for him.
Hakata Kanamori (金森 羽片, Kanamori Hakata)
Voiced by: Mai Nakahara (drama CD), Asuka Nishi (anime)
An author of yaoi dōjinshi who is constantly being sexually harassed by Kyoko.
Rikei Hiromatsu (廣松 理圭, Hiromatsu Rikei)
Voiced by: Ayumi Tsuji (drama CD), Risako Murai (anime)
An emotionless girl who simply goes with the flow. She appears to have a fetish for cats.
Hasumi Ōba (大庭 蓮實, Ōba Hasumi)
Voiced by: Ayako Kawasumi (drama CD), Satomi Satō (anime)
A polite and kindhearted member of the Astronomical Club, who is often seen conversing with Yuka. She will occasionally emit a scary aura.
Yuka Iseda (伊勢田 結花, Iseda Yuka)
Voiced by: Rie Kugimiya (drama CD), Midori Tsukimiya (anime)
The tsundere student council president who is constantly looking for a reason to shut down the Astronomical Club. She has feelings for Hasumi. She is also afraid of cats.
Shōko Ōmori (大森 荘子, Ōmori Shōko)
Voiced by: Kaori Nazuka
Supposedly the club's advisor, although she constantly insists that a cat is the advisor in order to escape harsh reality.
Eiji (エイジ)
Voiced by: Kazuhiko Inoue
Itsuki's older brother and Shōko's "boyfriend". He is the same kind of person as Kyōko, but at a professional level.

== Media ==
=== Manga ===
The manga is serialized in Seinen magazine Comp Ace, running from December 2008.

=== Anime ===
A 10-episode original net animation adaptation by AIC Classic was streamed on Nico Nico Douga between July 14, 2012, and September 15, 2012. A television broadcast featuring longer episodes began airing from October 3, 2012, and is being streamed by Crunchyroll. An OVA episode was bundled with the fourth volume of the manga, released in January 2013. The series has been licensed in North America by Sentai Filmworks. Each episode parodies an anime or television show.

==== Episode list ====
No.	Title	Original release date
1	"Be Reborn! The Astronomical Legend"; Transliteration: "Yomigaere! Tenmon Densetsu" (Japanese: よみがえれ! 天悶伝説)	July 14, 2012
Upon entering Ebisugawa High School, Itsuki Noya goes to the 'Tenmon' club, believing it to be the astronomy club, and wishes to join. However, the club president, Kyōko Todayama, decides to first put Itsuki through some bizarre tests, which seemingly have nothing to do with astronomy. After the tests are more or less deemed worthless, Itsuki is made a member, saving the club from being abolished. Episode Parody: Saint Seiya
2	"Crybaby Hakata's Stunning Transformation"; Transliteration: "Nakimushi Hakata no Kareinaru Henshin" (Japanese: 泣き虫はかたの華麗なる変身)	July 21, 2012
Crybaby Hakata Kanamori is pushed around by Kyoko as she attempts to recruit people for the Tenmon club, the pressure of which soon causes her to delusionally dress up as a bunny. Kyoko soon decides to take advantage of Hakata's delusions and thrusts her into a magical girl battle to bring her back to the Tenmon club. Episode Parody: Sailor Moon
3	"From Confetti Candy With Love"; Transliteration: "Konpeitō yori Ai o Komete" (Japanese: 金平糖より愛をこめて)	July 28, 2012
A girl from another school becomes interested in the Tenmon club, although Kyoko is oddly hostile towards her. It is soon revealed she is Kyoko's younger sister, Izumiko, who was close with Kyoko before she ended up divulging in her delusions. Kyoko and Izumiko soon engage in a quiz battle, which is interrupted by the student council president, Yuka Iseda, forcing them to settle their score in another fashion. Episode Parody: Ultraman Series
4	"Kokuin 2012"; Transliteration: "Kokuin 2012" (Japanese: 刻印2012)	August 4, 2012
Club member Rikei Hiromatsu develops a fetish for being rubbed against by the club's cat mascot, Neko-sensei. She later runs into Izumiko again, prompting her to try to make amends with Kyoko. Meanwhile, the school is plagued with incidents of girls fainting, with Yuka threatening to abolish the Tenmon club if they can't prove they are innocent by the end of the day. Too lazy to investigate properly, Kyoko decides to accuse the first person she sees, which turns out to be Izumiko. However, the club's vice president, Hasumi Ōba, proves Izumiko's innocence whilst Rikei uses an army of cats to stop Yuka from abolishing the club. Afterwards, Izumiko joins the rest of the club in viewing the stars, where she notices a particular star, apparently known as the Death Star. Episode Parody: Blue Comet SPT Layzner
5	"This is the Miracle of the Astronomical Club! The Maid is Alightened!"; Transliteration: "Koko ga Kiseki no Tenmon-bu! Meido ga Maiorita!" (Japanese: ここが奇跡の天悶部！ メイドが舞い降りた！)	August 11, 2012
Izumiko, who had long been searching for Itsuki, finally finds him, becoming shocked by the fact he was crossdressing the entire time. Itsuki explains how he was forced to crossdress as Kyoko only wanted girls to join the Tenmon club. Izumiko reveals she is the personal maid for Itsuki, who is the successor to the Noya group, often treating him like a toy. As Izumiko feuds against Kyoko over who gets to own Itsuki, she finds herself interesting in perfecting his crossdressing. Not willing to hand Itsuki over, Izumiko decides to transfer schools and join the Tenmon club. Episode Parody: Fist of the North Star
6	"Aim for the Stars! The Girl Who Dreams of Love"; Transliteration: "Hoshi o Nerae! Ai o Yumemiru Shōjo" (Japanese: ホシを狙え！ 愛を夢見る少女)	August 18, 2012
Yuka, who is revealed to be a former member of the Tenmon club, comes to the clubroom to abolish it. Hasumi invites Yuka to go stargazing with them before making a decision. Whilst waiting for it to get dark, the club holds a hero show whilst Hasumi and Yuka recall their childhood, in which they met an old lady who loves stargazing together. Later that night as Yuka is scared off by scary stories, she and Hasumi end up at the house where the old lady lived before she died. It is then revealed that the hero show was a part time job so the club could rent a telescopic camera to take a picture of the Rosette Nebula the old lady had always wanted to see. Episode Parody: Metal Hero Series - mainly Space Sheriff Shaider
7	"Viva-ten"; Transliteration: "Bibaten" (Japanese: ビバ天)	August 25, 2012
Kyoko impulsively decides to form a band, only to realise no one can actually play any instruments. As Kyoko remains undeterred and decides to shoot a PV to recruit musicians, the gang follow Neko-sensei and discover their teacher, Shōko Ōmori, is an obsessive stalker. Later, Kyoko arranged for Itsuki and Hakata to be locked in the clubroom in the hopes of gaining some 'interesting footage', but also to get Izumiko to get over Itsuki. It soon ends when Izumiko breaks them out after noticing Itsuki having headaches from stimulating situations. After being exposed to another bout of fanservice, Itsuki has a sudden change in personality, becoming his true self. Episode Parody: K-on!
8	"TTR Astronomical Club Special Investigation Team: Astronomical Special Endless Herbs (Pheremone)"; Transliteration: "TTR Tenmon-bu Tokusō Chōsahan Tenmon Supesharu Hateshinaki Feromon" (Japanese: TTR 天悶部特捜調査班 天悶スペシャル 果てしなき香草（フェロモン）)	September 1, 2012
Without the constant medicine doses Izumiko had given him in the past, Itsuki becomes a confident fiend who can make women bow to him with his pheremones. As the others realise they need a drug to counter the effects of Itsuki's pheremones, Itsuki starts spreading his pheromones across the school, turning all the girls into loyal zombies. Kyoko develops a new batch of anti-pheremone and confronts Itsuki, but Izumiko stands in her way, allowing Itsuki to knock her out and escape with the anti-pheremone. Episode Parody: MMR:Magazine Mystery Reportage
9	"The Astronomical Club's Great Victory! Face Tomorrow, Ready Go!!"; Transliteration: "Tenmon-bu Dai-shōri! Ashita ni Mukatte Redī Gō!!" (Japanese: 天悶部大勝利！明日に向かってレディーゴー!!)	September 8, 2012
Kyoko and the others confront Itsuki, who transforms into a handsome adult form and uses a drug to transform Kyoko and Hakata into little girls with the intention of making them his loli maids. As Shōko manages to rescue them, Kyoko deduces that the same drug was used to keep Itsuki under control. Just as Itsuki arrives on the scene, his elder brother and Shōko's boyfriend briefly appears, turning Kyoko and Hakata back to normal before leaving. As Kyoko confronts Itsuki in a final showdown, she explains her research up until now was for the purpose of escaping the force engagement between her and Itsuki. As Itsuki overpower Kyoko, Izumiko stands against him, causing him to recall his true self and shoot himself with the antidote. Episode Parody: Dragon Ball
10	"Beautiful Dreamers"; Transliteration: "Byūtifuru Dorīmāzu" (Japanese: ビューティフルドリーマーズ)	September 15, 2012
With everything settled and Itsuki reverted to his normal form, the school prepares for a culture festival. As Kyoko questions Izumiko over why she likes Itsuki, she explains how she initially hated him when he transferred into her school, but warmed up to him as they started stargazing. Believing everything to be okay, Itsuki relieves Izumiko of her duty as his maid, which comes as a shock for her. Whilst following Neko-sensei the next day, Izumiko recalls how she first resisted against Itsuki's pheromone state. When Itsuki tried to jump in order to repent himself, Izumiko saved him but fell too, with Itsuki losing his memories of the incident protecting her, which he only regained following the battle with Kyoko. When Izumiko is put in trouble again after a 'telescope' tank dangles her over the edge of the building, Itsuki steps in to rescue her, confessing his love for her. They both fall, but are saved by the other club members. Afterwards, Kyoko arranged for her engagement to Itsuki to be cancelled so he can get together with Izumiko. Episode Parody: Urusei Yatsura
