= Sarasa Nagase =

Japanese novelist

- 永瀬さらさ
- Born: May 26
- Occupation: Novelist
- Writing career
- Period: 2013-present
- Notable work: I'm the Villainess, So I'm Taming the Final Boss The Do-Over Damsel Conquers the Dragon Emperor
- Notable awards: The 11th Kadokawa Beans Novel Award: Encouragement Award and Reader's Choice Award; 2012

Sarasa Nagase (永瀬さらさ; May 26) is a Japanese novelist living in Kyoto.

== Career ==
Her debut novel, Seireiuta-shi to Yumemiru Yasai (精霊歌士と夢見る野菜; Spirit Singers and Dreaming Vegetables, originally titled My Grandfathers' Clock) won the 2012 11th Kadokawa Beans Novel Award: Encouragement Award and Reader's Choice Award.

== Works ==
- Seireiuta-shi to Yumemiru Yasai (精霊歌士と夢見る野菜; lit. 'Spirit Singers and Dreaming Vegetables') series.

No.	Title	Release date	ISBN
1	Seirei kashi to yumemiru yasai (精霊歌士と夢見る野菜)	November 1, 2013	978-4041010686
2	Seirei kashi to yumemiru yasai: Beni-iro no shukusai (精霊歌士と夢見る野菜 紅色の祝祭)	March 1, 2014	978-4041012550
3	Seirei kashi to yumemiru yasai: Konjiki no yakusoku (精霊歌士と夢見る野菜 金色の約束)	August 1, 2014	978-4041016664

- German Court Orchestra Score (ドイツェン宮廷楽団譜, Doitsu~en kyūtei gakudan fu)
- I'm the Villainess, So I'm Taming the Final Boss, originally published in Shōsetsuka ni Narō, acquired by Kadokawa Shoten and is published by Yen Press in English. It received an anime adaptation by Maho Film.
- The Do-Over Damsel Conquers the Dragon Emperor, originally published in Shōsetsuka ni Narō, acquired by Kadokawa Shoten and is published by in English by Cross Infinite World. It received an anime adaptation by J.C. Staff.
- The Disowned Queen's Consulting Detective Agency (勘当されたので探偵屋はじめます！ 実は亡国の女王だなんて内緒です, Kandō Sareta no de Tantei-ya Hajimemasu! Jitsu wa Bōkoku no Joōda Nante Naisho Desu; I've Been Disowned, So I'm Starting A Detective Agency! It's a secret That I'm Actually The Queen of a Fallen Kingdom.) originally published in Shōsetsuka ni Narō, acquired by Earth Star Publishing. Published in English by J-Novel Club.
