= I'm the Villainess, So I'm Taming the Final Boss =

Japanese light novel series

- First light novel volume cover

悪役令嬢なのでラスボスを飼ってみました (Akuyaku Reijō Nanode Rasubosu o Katte Mimashita)
- Genre: Isekai
- Novel series
- Written by: Sarasa Nagase
- Published by: Shōsetsuka ni Narō
- Original run: May 2017 – August 2019
- Light novel
- Written by: Sarasa Nagase
- Illustrated by: Mai Murasaki
- Published by: Kadokawa Shoten
- English publisher: NA: Yen Press
- Imprint: Kadokawa Beans Bunko
- Original run: September 1, 2017 – present
- Volumes: 11
- Manga
- Written by: Sarasa Nagase
- Illustrated by: Anko Yuzu
- Published by: Kadokawa Shoten
- English publisher: NA: Yen Press
- Magazine: Comp Ace
- Original run: June 2018 – August 2019
- Volumes: 3
- Anime television series
- Directed by: Kumiko Habara
- Written by: Kenta Ihara
- Music by: Natsumi Tabuchi; Hanae Nakamura; Miki Sakurai; Sayaka Aoki; Kanade Sakuma
- Studio: Maho Film
- Licensed by: Crunchyroll; SA/SEA: Medialink
- Original network: Tokyo MX, MBS, Wowow, AT-X, BS-TBS
- Original run: October 1, 2022 – December 17, 2022
- Episodes: 12
- icon

I'm the Villainess, So I'm Taming the Final Boss (悪役令嬢なのでラスボスを飼ってみました, Akuyaku Reijō Nanode Rasubosu o Katte Mimashita) is a Japanese light novel series written by Sarasa Nagase and illustrated by Mai Murasaki. It began serialization online in May 2017 on the user-generated novel publishing website Shōsetsuka ni Narō. It was later acquired by Kadokawa Shoten, who have published ten volumes since September 2017 under their Kadokawa Beans Bunko imprint. A manga adaptation with art by Anko Yuzu was serialized in Kadokawa Shoten's seinen manga magazine Comp Ace from June 2018 to August 2019. It was collected in three tankōbon volumes. Both the light novel and manga are licensed in North America by Yen Press. An anime television series adaptation produced by Maho Film aired from October to December 2022.

== Premise ==
Aileen Lauren d'Autriche, fiancee of the Crown Prince Cedric Jean Ellmeyer abruptly regains her memories of a past life moments after he publicly breaks their engagement. She realizes she has been reborn into the world of the fictional otome game Regalia of Saints, Demons and Maidens, as the game's villainess. To prevent her death, Aileen must stop the game's other villain, former Prince and current Demon Lord, Claude Jean Ellemeyer, from awakening his final powers. She wishes to avert her fate by proposing a marriage to Claude. However, accomplishing her goals may be harder than she expected.

== Characters ==
Aileen Lauren d'Autriche (アイリーン・ローレン・ドートリシュ, Airīn Rōren Dōtorishu)
Voiced by: Rie Takahashi (Japanese); Alexis Tipton (English)
The youngest child and only daughter of the Duke d'Autriche, Alieen grew up overshadowed by her three older brothers until the Crown Prince of the Ellemeyer Empire proposed to her. The engagement gave Aileen purpose, leading her to work hard and excel in sports and studies. Her dedication made her appear vain and snobbish to her peers, who ostracized her. In her previous life, she was a terminally ill Japanese teenager obsessed with the fictional otome game Regalia of Saints, Demons and Maidens. Aileen wants to use her position to create a better, more equal world for humans and demons alike.
Claude Jean Ellmeyer (クロード・ジャンヌ・エルメイア, Kurōdo Jannu Erumeia)
Voiced by: Yūichirō Umehara (Japanese); John Burgmeier (English)
Claude is the oldest son of the current Emperor. The original heir to the throne, Claude was disinherited when he displayed magical powers early in his childhood, as they revealed his half-demon status. Claude grew to become ruler of demonkind. He was the final boss in the original game, destined to succumb to his demonic side, killing Aileen off-screen before dying at the hands of the Holy Sword Maiden. He is an intelligent and capable ruler. He slowly becomes more open as a result of his interactions with Aileen.
Cedric Jean Ellmeyer (セドリック・ジャンヌ・エルメイア, Sedorikku Jannu Erumeia)
Voiced by: Toshiki Masuda (Japanese); Kyle Igneczi (English)
Cedric is Claude's younger half-brother and heir to the throne after Claude was ousted. Although charismatic, Cedric is deeply insecure. He was the heroine's main romantic route in the original game. Cedric falls in love with Lilia Reinoise and ends his engagement to Aileen.
Keith Eigrid (キース・エイグリッド, Kīsu Eiguriddo)
Voiced by: Jun Fukuyama (Japanese); Kyle Phillips (English)
Claude's devoted aide and right-hand man. As a child, he was a page to the royal family. A young Prince Claude used his powers to save him from drowning. His selfless rescue earned him Keith's undying devotion. He followed Claude into exile by choice.
Beelzebuth (ベルゼビュート, Beruzebyūto)
Voiced by: Yūki Ono (Japanese); Brandon Johnson (English)
Claude's demon aide. Beelzebuth is fiercely loyal to Claude, often acting as a sort of bodyguard to him. Aileen earns his loyalty.
Lilia Reinoise (リリア・レインワーズ, Riria Reinwāzu)
Voiced by: Kana Hanazawa (Japanese); Hayden Daviau (English)
The game's heroine and main character in the original setting, and the series' main antagonist. Lilia is the Holy Sword Maiden, which grants her powers effective against demons and the ability to summon the Maiden's Holy Sword.
Almond (アーモンド, Āmondo)
Voiced by: Tomokazu Sugita (Japanese); Anthony Bowling (English)
A crow in the service of Claude. Like most of demonkind, he is very loyal and protective of his lord. He is named Almond by Aileen after he enjoys her almond cookies.
Isaac Lombard (アイザック・ロンバール, Aizakku Ronbāru)
Voiced by: Yuma Uchida (Japanese); Alejandro Saab (English)
A close childhood friend of Aileen's and the one she trusts to join her in all her adventures, no matter how dangerous. He is cautious and prudent.
Jasper Varie (ジャスパー・バリエ, Jasupā Barie)
Voiced by: Hiroki Yasumoto (Japanese); Marcus D. Stimac (English)
A journalist and friend of Aileen. His newspaper specializes in reporting that champions fairness and truth. Jasper has a vast networks of contacts, who can be trusted to provide sensitive information.
Denis (ドニ, Doni)
Voiced by: Takuto Yoshinaga (Japanese); Ciarán Strange (English)
A sixteen-year-old genius architect and inventor in Aileen's service.
Luc (リュック, Ryukku)
Voiced by: Shin'ichirō Kamio (Japanese); Jerry Jewell (English)
A skilled doctor who specializes in clinical medicine. He is employed by Aileen.
Quartz (クォーツ, Kwōtsu)
Voiced by: Yu Miyazaki (Japanese); Jarrod Greene (English)
A botanist is employed by Aileen to work at Claude's castle to help maintain all the lord's plants.
James Charles (ゼームス・シャルル, Zēmusu Sharuru)
Voiced by: Soma Saito (Japanese); Ben Balmaceda (English)
The president of the Mische Academy school council. James is a half-demon, born under the name Ashtarte, though he goes to great lengths to hide it. James was the final boss of Regalia of Saints, Demons and Maidens 2. Aware of his fate, Aileen aims to save him.
Auguste Zelm (オーギュスト・ツェルム, Ōgyusuto Tserumu)
Voiced by: Tasuku Hatanaka
The vice-president of the student council of the Mische Academy and the first romance route of the original sequel game.
Walt Lizanis (ウォルト・リザニス, Woruto Rizanisu)
Voiced by: Toshiyuki Toyonaga (Japanese); James Cheek (English)
A member of the Mische Academy school council and the second romance route of the original sequel game.
Kyle Elford (カイル・エルフォード, Kairu Erufōdo)
Voiced by: Chiaki Kobayashi (Japanese); Kieran Flitton (English)
A member of the Mische Academy school council and the third romance route of the original sequel game.
Selena Gilbert (セレナ・ジルベール, Serena Jirubēru)
Voiced by: Ayana Taketatsu (Japanese); Emily Neves (English)
A female student at the Mische Academy and the heroine in the original sequel.
Rachel Danis (レイチェル・ダニス, Reicheru Danisu)
Voiced by: Rie Murakawa
A female student of the Mische Academy. She develops feelings for Isaac.
Elephas Levi (エレファス・レヴィ, Erefasu Revi)
Voiced by: Koki Uchiyama
A mage and member of the Levi tribe, he was the final boss of the fan disc of the original game.

== Media ==
=== Light novels ===
The series by Sarasa Nagase began serialization online on the user-generated novel publishing website Shōsetsuka ni Narō in May 2017. It was acquired by Kadokawa Shoten who began publishing it as a light novel with illustrations by Mai Murasaki through their Kadokawa Beans Bunko imprint on September 1, 2017. The light novel is licensed in North America by Yen Press. As of December 2022, eleven volumes have been released.

No.	Original release date	Original ISBN	English release date	English ISBN
1	September 1, 2017	978-4-04-106036-0	October 12, 2021	978-1-9753-3405-5
2	March 1, 2018	978-4-04-106037-7	February 22, 2022	978-1-9753-3407-9
3	September 1, 2018	978-4-04-107258-5	June 21, 2022	978-1-9753-3409-3
4	March 1, 2019	978-4-04-107259-2	November 8, 2022	978-1-9753-3411-6
5	July 1, 2019	978-4-04-108267-6	April 18, 2023	978-1-9753-3413-0
6	September 1, 2019	978-4-04-108268-3	August 22, 2023	978-1-9753-3415-4
7	January 1, 2020	978-4-04-108962-0	December 12, 2023	978-1-9753-3417-8
8	September 1, 2020	978-4-04-109847-9	April 16, 2024	978-1-9753-3419-2
9	October 1, 2021	978-4-04-111863-4	September 17, 2024	978-1-9753-7834-9
10	September 30, 2022	978-4-04-112995-1	June 3, 2025	978-1-9753-7836-3
11	December 28, 2022	978-4-04-113125-1	September 23, 2025	978-1-9753-7838-7

=== Manga ===
A manga adaptation by Anko Yuzu was serialized in Kadokawa Shoten's seinen manga magazine Comp Ace from June 2018 to August 2019. It was collected in three tankōbon volumes. The manga is also licensed in North America by Yen Press.

No.	Original release date	Original ISBN	English release date	English ISBN
1	November 26, 2018	978-4-04-107720-7	October 26, 2021	978-1-9753-2120-8
2	June 26, 2019	978-4-04-108347-5	November 30, 2021	978-1-9753-2121-5
3	December 26, 2019	978-4-04-108930-9	March 1, 2022	978-1-9753-2123-9

=== Anime ===
On October 1, 2021, an anime adaptation was announced. It was later revealed to be a television series produced by Maho Film and directed by Kumiko Habara, with scripts written by Kenta Ihara, and character designs handled by Momoko Makiuchi, Eri Kojima, and Yūko Ōba. The music is composed by Natsumi Tabuchi, Hanae Nakamura, Miki Sakurai, Sayaka Aoki, and Kanade Sakuma. It aired from October 1 to December 17, 2022, on Tokyo MX, MBS, Wowow, AT-X, and BS-TBS. The opening theme song is "Kyо̄kan Sarenakute mo Ii Janai" (共感されなくてもいいじゃない) by Rie Takahashi, while the ending theme song is "Nomick" (ノミック, Nomikku) by ACCAMER. Crunchyroll streamed the series outside of Asia, and have premiered an English dub starting on October 15, 2022. Medialink licensed the series across Asia-Pacific.

No.	Title	Directed by (Note: Information is taken from the ending credits of each episode.)	Written by	Storyboarded by	Original release date (Note: Episodes are released on Abema a week before their air dates on television.)
1	"The Wicked Heiress's Story Begins"; Transliteration: "Akuyaku Reijō no Makuake" (Japanese: 悪役令嬢の幕開け)	Kumiko Habara	Kenta Ihara	Kumiko Habara	October 1, 2022
The main character awakens in her life as Aileen Lauren d'Autriche, the villainess in the last otome game she played before her reincarnation, Regalia of Saints, Demons, and Maidens. Not only that, but she gains awareness in the middle of the game's ball where she is dumped by her fiancé, crown prince Cedric Jean Ellmeyer, for the game's heroine, Lilia Reinoise. Refusing to give her ex-fiancé the satisfaction of seeing her cry, she politely excuses herself and leaves. Realizing she's nearing the end of the game, wherein the demon lord awakens and kills off her character, she vows to find and "tame" him to prevent her own death. She makes her way to the demon lord's domain where she confirms his identity as Claude Jean Ellmeyer and asks him to marry her.
2	"The Villainess May Have Many Enemies, but She Also Has Many Underlings"; Transliteration: "Akuyaku Reijō wa Teki mo Ōiga Teshita mo Ōi" (Japanese: 悪役令嬢は敵も多いが手下も多い)	Naoyoshi Kusaka	Kenta Ihara	M.F.K	October 8, 2022
Aileen's business achievements in pharmaceuticals and agriculture will become Cedric's after their engagement is officially annulled, and her father coldly orders her to recoup the losses before the next ball in two months. Later, she meets an old friend, Jasper Varie, and asks him for a favor. Aileen proposes to renovate Claude's castle, Claude tasks Keith with finding out who has been embezzling funds meant for him and his domain. Claude aids Aileen in being universally accepted by demons everywhere. The next day, Aileen, Jasper, and the workers she hired arrive. It's determined that Luc, Quartz, and Isaac will make cosmetics for Aileen's new business ventures. Meanwhile, Cedric is concerned about Aileen's association with the demon lord. With the repairs going well, Claude and Keith inform Aileen that the embezzlement issue has been resolved.
3	"The Villainess Is Greedy and Goes for the Win"; Transliteration: "Akuyaku Reijō wa Gōyoku nanode Kachi ni Iku" (Japanese: 悪役令嬢は強欲なので勝ちに行く)	Kyōhei Ōyabu	Kenta Ihara	Kumiko Habara	October 15, 2022
Almond finds a threatening letter in the garbage at the academy and retrieves it. Claude gifts Aileen with an outfit to wear to the ball that evening. Aileen and Isaac theorize that the threatening letters are forgeries is correct. Lilia is declared missing. Cedric suspects Aileen and sends a search party into Claude's domain. Cedric orders Aileen's arrest at the ball. Lilia arrives in Claude's castle, surprising him as she got past his magic barrier without him knowing, and professes pity for him. Lilia accidentally causes Claude and Beelzebuth pain by nature of her Holy Sword Maiden powers and desperately tries to get Claude on her side. Claude becomes enraged and demands she leave. Claude arrives at the ball and saves Aileen. With Isaac's help, Aileen proves that she was framed. She signs the annulment documents, officially ending her engagement to Cedric, and Claude asks her to dance. Claude escorts Aileen home after the ball. He kisses her goodnight, but at the same time Aileen gets a flashback from the game of Claude fully transforming into a demon lord after being betrayed by the person he trusted most.
4	"The Villainess Should Be Able to Tame the Final Boss"; Transliteration: "Akuyaku Reijō wa Rasubosu datta Kaeru Hazu" (Japanese: 悪役令嬢はラスボスだった飼えるはず)	Toshiaki Kanbara	Kenta Ihara	Kunihisa Sugishima	October 22, 2022
Aileen and Beelzebuth confront Keith for selling demons into slavery. Keith forged the original documents for the land sale, resulting in him being blackmailed into selling demons to keep the forgery a secret. Aileen concocts a plan to capture the noble blackmailing Keith. Cedric and Lilia show up and kidnap Aileen. The assault is foiled by Claude, who loses control and transforms into a dragon. Lilia attacks, but is intercepted by Aileen, who declares that she has Sword Maiden blood, too. After, she professes her love to Claude and cries, her tears bring him back to his human form. Cedric's right to the throne is revoked and Claude becomes the crown prince once again, taking Aileen as his fiancée.
5	"The Villainess Tricks Her Fiancé"; Transliteration: "Akuyaku Reijō wa Konyakusha o Damasu" (Japanese: 悪役令嬢は婚約者をだます)	Naoyoshi Kusaka	Kenta Ihara	M.F.K	October 29, 2022
Events from Regalia of Saints, Demons, and Maidens 2 begin to unfold. Someone is using demon incense to incite the demons and boost physical strength in humans. A demon uprising occurs in the duchy of Mirchetta, led by a demon claiming to be a representative of demon-kind named Ashtarte. Claude intends to go and negotiate alone. Aileen goes undercover as a boy named Ailey at Mische Academy in Mirchetta, together with Isaac without Claude's knowledge. On her first day, she saves the game's villainess, Rachel Danis, from her abusive fiancé. Later, she meets Walt Lizanis, Auguste Zelm, and Kyle Elford, and finally the game's final boss, James Charles, who is half demon. She also meets the game's heroine, Selena Gilbert, who idolizes Lilia Reinoise and despises Aileen. Aileen joins the student council to uncover who's responsible for the release of demon incense. As a test, James, the council president, tasks her with investigating a potential vampire attack on a female student to prove her worth. While on patrol with Isaac, they find Rachel being threatened by one of the professors. When the professor attempts to harm Rachel, Isaac rescues her and Ailey gives chase after the professor. She smells demon incense and finds the professor unconscious with James looming over him in demon form.
6	"The Villainess Is Unforgiving of Evil"; Transliteration: "Akuyaku Reijō wa Aku o Yurusanai" (Japanese: 悪役令嬢は悪を許さない)	Kyōhei Ōyabu	Kenta Ihara	Kyōhei Ōyabu	November 5, 2022
Under the influence of demon incense, James struggles to remain human and Ailey tries to keep his secret from Walt, who followed her. James escapes thanks to Ailey, but her identity as a woman is revealed to Walt. Rachel explains the situation with the "vampire attack," that it was all orchestrated by the professor, and the mention of the professor using a mysterious smoking pipe makes Ailey suspicious. Ailey witnesses Selena's cruel side. After a threat from Ashtarte is made to the academy, Claude decides that he must inspect the academy to keep the students safe. Claude arrives at the academy. On patrol, demon incense nearly reveals James's true nature and they search for the source. Ailey exposes the plot to hide demon incense in the festival's prizes.
7	"The Villainess Steals the Show"; Transliteration: "Akuyaku Reijō wa Deban o Sōdori Suru" (Japanese: 悪役令嬢は出番を総取りする)	Naoyoshi Kusaka	Kenta Ihara	M.F.K	November 12, 2022
James tells Aileen that he is Ashtarte, but that someone else is using his name to commit crimes. Claude sneaks out to attend the festival at Mische Academy. At the festival, Ailey and the other student council members search for demon incense. Walt and Kyle inform Ailey that the Church has also covertly placed incense in the arena to try and draw the demon out of hiding. If Claude participates in the tournament, he will turn into a dragon if the incense is lit. Selena retrieves Claude for the tournament, but Ailey intercepts in costume to distract him. She insults Aileen, which angers Claude and backfires when he teleports them to the arena to challenge her to a duel. While fighting, Ailey dodges an attack and Claude destroys one of the incense burners, giving Ailey the idea to use Claude's attacks to destroy the incense and keep him safe. Walt and Kyle arrive in costume to try and help Ailey, and Auguste arrives just in time to save her from Claude after all the incense are destroyed. Before her identity can be revealed, Keith and Beelzebuth arrive, distracting Claude. Claude and Auguste become friends. The next day, Rachel volunteers to enter the White Lily Princess pageant to try and win the prize, which is demon incense. Isaac buys Rachel a dress, but Selena pushes Rachel down the stairs to ruin her chances. With Rachel's ankle sprained, Ailey volunteers to enter the pageant "in drag," arriving looking like herself, Aileen.
8	"The Crimes of the Villainess Are Revealed"; Transliteration: "Akuyaku Reijō no Akuji wa Abakareru" (Japanese: 悪役令嬢の悪事は暴かれる)	Naoyoshi Kusaka	Kenta Ihara	Kunihisa Sugishima	November 19, 2022
Ailey wins the pageant and receives the prize, an incense burner, running off with it before the award ceremony can conclude. However, once she reports to the Council, the incense burner is empty. Back on stage, Selena holds the stolen demon incense and announces that Ashtarte is in their midst. James's true nature is revealed by the incense and Ailey attempts to bring him back to his senses. After James reverts back, the Council members turn on Selena, who reveals that she was instructed by someone else. Suddenly, a horde of demons appears over the academy. Ailey reveals to the Council that she is really Aileen and attempts to use the Holy Sword to scare the demons away when Claude arrives. The next day, Aileen tries to reconcile with Claude for lying to him. Claude knew Selena was guilty all along, since she smelled of demon incense, and captured her the night before. Aileen concludes the person instructing Selena and posing as Ashtarte was Lilia and confronts her back in the capital. Lilia reveals that she was also reincarnated into the game world like Aileen. Lilia only views everything as a game while Aileen understands that this is reality for them now. "Ashtarte" calls off the demon attacks and peace returns to the academy.
9	"The Villainess Should Just Be Forgotten"; Transliteration: "Akuyaku Reijō no Koto wa Wasureta Kata ga Ii" (Japanese: 悪役令嬢のことは忘れた方がいい)	Kiyotaka Kanchiku	Kenta Ihara	Tetsurō Amino	November 26, 2022
Aileen, Walt, Kyle, Auguste, and James infiltrate a black market auction selling demons to bring it down. Aileen and Auguste are interrupted by a hooded sorcerer, who offers the evidence in exchange for an audience with the demon lord. His reveals himself to be Elephas Levi, the final boss of the first game's fan disc. Claude saves Aileen from falling off a balcony in shock and scolds her for keeping secrets. Aileen introduces Claude to Elephas. Claude goes missing and the magic barrier around the forest is gone. Suddenly, Aileen's father arrives and tells her that Claude has been stabbed, and that while he is okay, he has apparently lost his memories and magic. The Emperor prevents Aileen from seeing Claude. A ball is planned for Claude to find a new fiancée. Cedric and Lilia protest the annulment of Aileen and Claude's engagement, branding it suspicious to do after he's lost his memory, and convinces the Dowager Empress to allow Aileen to attend the ball. The Dowager declares that if Aileen attempts to see Claude before the ball, she will be executed. Lilia reveals that this is all part of her plan to challenge Aileen. Almond finds where Claude is being kept and Elephas helps her infiltrate the building to see him. Claude wonders if they're fated to be together.
10	"The Love of the Villainess Doesn't Reach"; Transliteration: "Akuyaku Reijō no Ai wa Todokanai" (Japanese: 悪役令嬢の愛は届かない)	Toshiaki Kanbara	Kenta Ihara	Kunihisa Sugishima	December 3, 2022
Aileen forms a plan to get Claude back with Isaac. Jasper arrives to inform them that Claude is doing an inspection of the kingdom with Cedric and Lilia. Elephas advises on how Aileen might trigger Claude's memories to return. Aileen plans to infiltrate the inspection party and sneaks in to visit Claude again. A fight breaks out at the demon lord castle when Selena shows up, having been apprehended by Auguste for leaving Mirchetta against Claude's orders. Auguste tries to speak with Selena before she leaves but is rejected. Aileen once again disguises herself as Ailey to infiltrate Claude's guards as a new recruit. Claude realizes immediately but keeps it a secret for her safety, warning her to stay away from him. An upset Aileen declares that she won't be attending the ball.
11	"The Villainess Always Gets Condemned"; Transliteration: "Itsudatte Akuyaku Reijō wa Danzai sareru" (Japanese: いつだって悪役令嬢は断罪される)	Naoyoshi Kusaka	Kenta Ihara	M.F.K	December 10, 2022
Claude requests that the demons convince Aileen to attend the ball. They reconcile. Elephas betrays Aileen even though he doesn't want to. He shows her that he has taken Almond hostage. Aileen is accused of betraying Claude and the city. Claude asks Aileen to tell him she loves him and he will believe her, but with Almond's life at risk, she lies and says she never loved him. Almond suddenly breaks out of his prison and tells Claude Aileen is lying, but Elephas shoots Almond with magic, killing him. Some of Claude's demon powers return and he tells Aileen to protect the demons until he returns, teleporting her and the gang back to his castle. At Claude's castle, Keith becomes provisional demon lord and orders all the demons to flee. Back at the imperial palace, Claude sadly holds Almond and is attacked by Lilia, who uses demon incense and a new Holy Sword she acquired to pacify him. The gang are forced to separate to evade imperial forces. James goes with Aileen. While flying on a demon's back, Elephas finds them and takes Aileen hostage. Her Holy Sword activates by itself and Aileen uses the distraction to throw herself and Elephas off the demon's back, sending them plummeting to the ground.
12	"Even the Villainess Can Be the Main Character if There Is Love"; Transliteration: "Akuyaku Reijō datte Ai ga Areba Shujinkō" (Japanese: 悪役令嬢だって愛があれば主人公)	Naoyoshi Kusaka	Kenta Ihara	Tetsurō Amino	December 17, 2022
Elephas and Aileen have been detained by Levi family, having landed directly in their domain, who intend to use the demon lord to attack the Empire and free the family members the Dowager is holding hostage. Elephas reveals the Dowager was the "horrible master" he was serving. He tells her that Lilia got her hands on another Holy Sword and ordered him to attack Claude with it, which is how he lost his memories and powers. During their fall, Aileen absorbed all Elephas's magic, so he can't help them escape, but Aileen uses the Sword to escape. Before she breaks him out, Elephas removes one of his eyes as penance and gives it to Aileen, telling her to use it to break the spell on Claude. Aileen leaves Beelzebuth in charge of the demons while she and Elephas go to rescue Claude. James contacts Aileen and informs her they've found Claude, but that the situation with him and the guards is dire. Aileen and Lilia duel. Lilia tries to reabsorb Aileen's Holy Sword, but she uses Claude's demon powers to thwart the attempt. Aileen becomes more powerful and destroys Lilia's sword, winning the duel. Almond, who wasn't truly dead, is released by Cedric and stops Lilia, allowing Elephas to use his sorcerer's eye to break the spell on Claude, meanwhile the Dowager loses her youth and beauty. Cedric leaves Lilia and Elephas swears his loyalty to Claude. The shamed Emperor and now elderly Dowager's corruption is exposed as the two flee the country in order to escape justice. Cedric and Lilia are sentenced to prison, and Aileen and Claude are finally married.

== Reception ==
By May 2023, the series has sold over 1.3 million copies.

Rebecca Silverman of Anime News Network said of the first volume of the light novel: "It isn't wholly innovative, but Aileen's growing awareness that she's actively rewriting the plot is good, and the novel just gets better as it goes on." She praised the illustrations and said that "Aileen's active script-flipping gives the book a real edge", but criticized its use of familiar story beats and present tense narration. She later reviewed the second and third volumes, stating: "Both books have a lot of good giggles in them, with the ducks being a highlight across both volumes. The epilogue to volume three is a delightful comedy of errors ... and Aileen, although at times unbelievably dense, is mostly a very engaging heroine."

== See also ==
- Within the Villainess, another light novel series by the same illustrator
- Betrothed to My Sister's Ex, another light novel series by the same illustrator
- The Most Heretical Last Boss Queen, another light novel series that centers on a similar plot of a girl reincarnating as the main antagonist of an Otome game.
- The Villainess Is Adored by the Prince of the Neighbor Kingdom, another light novel series that centers on a similar plot of a girl reincarnating as the main antagonist of an Otome game.
