= Hibiki's Magic =

Manga series by Jun Maeda

- Cover of volume 1 of Hibiki's Magic, published by Tokyopop, showing Hibiki.

ヒビキのマホウ (Hibiki no Mahō)
- Genre: Drama, Fantasy
- Manga
- Written by: Jun Maeda
- Illustrated by: Rei Izumi
- Published by: Kadokawa Shoten
- English publisher: NA: Viz Media
- Magazine: Shōnen Ace (former); Comp Ace
- Original run: August 2004 – May 2016
- Volumes: 6

Hibiki's Magic (ヒビキのマホウ, Hibiki no Mahō), subtitled a continental chronicle in the original version, is a Japanese manga series written by Jun Maeda and illustrated by Rei Izumi. The story centers on a young girl named Hibiki who is the apprentice to a very skilled wizard named Shirotsuki. Hibiki does not have much skill with magic, and the only thing she is really good at is making tea. After an accident where her teacher nearly dies, Hibiki comes to stay at a famous magic academy and works as a teacher herself.

Hibiki's Magic started serialization in the August 2004 issue of Kadokawa Shoten's Shōnen Ace, but later transferred to Kadokawa's Comp Ace in November 2005, and concluded in the May 2016 issue. Tokyopop licensed the series in North America, and released the first two volumes in 2007. The manga is described by Anime News Network as having an "inspirational tone" with a very cute style of storytelling. IGN Comics describes the manga as a "solid story that breaks out of that cuteness mold."

== Plot ==
Hibiki's Magic revolves around the title character Hibiki, a lonely young girl under the wing of a skilled wizard named Shirotsuki. At the story's onset, Hibiki is living with Shirotsuki and is in training as an assistant to learn the art of magic. Shirotsuki, whom Hibiki refers to as "Master", is searching for the key to immortality. He is a renowned expert at the craft known as Magic Circles, which draws its power from the art of elaborate circles that enact various enchantments. Even though Shirotsuki invites Hibiki to learn what he knows, she is unskilled in magic and rarely succeeds in anything she does. In spite of repeatedly failing, she keeps trying with her teacher's encouragement.

Shirotsuki's research is interrupted when a group of men break into his house during an experiment. Shirotsuki's soul becomes trapped inside a squirrel-like creature called a gusk, and his real body is lost in a fire that results from his magical protection wards; Hibiki and the gusk barely escape alive. With nowhere else to go, Hibiki takes up residence in the nearby capital city Kamigusk. Hibiki is surprised that Shirotsuki's reputation precedes him, and she is taken to the local Kamisaid Magic Academy where she is given the position of professor. Hibiki's attempts to convince the administration of her shortcomings meet with failure. Hibiki is forced to learn to cope with being a professor in the most famous magic school in the country and meets many new people that help her along the way.

Hibiki meets a hard-to-handle student named Ahito who hates magic, and while he and Hibiki are eventually able to become friends, Ahito continues to hate magic. With the help of her master, Hibiki creates a homunculus in the form of a young girl which names herself Shiraasan. While she is hard to keep in line, Hibiki and Shiraasan share a close relationship. Hibiki meets a cursed girl named Nazuna Shireiyu, and Hibiki tries to help alleviate her curse, and in doing so becomes her friend. Nazuna turns out to be the granddaughter of the king of the land where Hibiki's Magic takes place.

In the world of Hibiki's Magic, in order to gain magic one must make a sacrifice. It can be a physical sacrifice, such as Ahito experiencing pain, or a mental sacrifice, such as Shirotsuki losing his memories. Hibiki tries to help by making the sacrifices a little more bearable.

== Characters ==
Hibiki's Magic characters (from left to right): Mizuki, Yui, Shirotsuki, Hibiki, Ahito, Shiraasan, Yukko, Ikko, Asuma, Misaki, and Nanako.

Hibiki (ヒビキ)
Hibiki is a young girl with little confidence in her abilities, except in tea making. When she met Shirotsuki, Hibiki was a shy girl who would hide in the corner of a room in his house speechlessly. Eventually, Hibiki warmed up to Shirotsuki's affectionate personality and came to consider him a very important person. Hibiki can be very lighthearted, and always helps people who need it. She has no talent for magic, and relies on her master to help her in this regard. She is a crybaby and somewhat clumsy, but does her best and wins people over with her abundant kindness and warm heart.
Shirotsuki (シロツキ)
Shirotsuki is a very skilled wizard who took Hibiki into his home in order to train her as an assistant to his craft. Despite Hibiki's constant failures, Shirotsuki never gets angry with her and lets her take her time to get it right. He had been in love with a young woman his age named Yui, but had sacrificed his memories of her and his loved ones for his magic.
Ahito (アヒト)
Ahito is a young man enrolled as a student at Kamisaid Magic Academy. In spite of this, he does not believe that magic is useful to mankind He had been forced to go to the academy by his grandmother. His parents had died in a war while conducting horrible experiments and he remarks that "they deserved it". This attitude stems from a series of painful magical experiments he was involved in as a child so he could save a girl his age named Mizuki, but she died prematurely. Ahito becomes friends with Hibiki, and starts to act a little more nicely to her. Ahito sacrificed going through pain for his magic; he is physically injured after gazing upon someone with his healing eyes.
Shiraasan (シイラアサン, Shiiraasan)
Shiraasan, also known as Shi-chan, is a female homunculus, or artificial human, created by a joint effort of Hibiki and Shirotsuki. Despite looking like a very young girl, Shiraasan has the maturity of an adult who finds nothing wrong with reading newspapers or smoking cigarettes. Since homunculi were originally created as weapons in Hibiki's Magic, Shiraasan can procure guns and other weapons to use as she pleases, such as taking care of stray flies. Shiraasan has a very independent personality and does not like to be told what she can and cannot do. After it is confirmed that she is a stable lifeform, Shiraasan warms up to Hibiki and loves her very much.
Asuma (アスマ)
Asuma is a male wizard with a frivolous personality and is the director of Kamisaid Magic Academy. He likes using magic to surprise others, such as making flowers and small birds appear out of nowhere. His sacrifice for magic is that he ages quickly. For example, when Misaki was saved by him, she was surprised he had aged a few years in one day.
Misaki (ミサキ)
Misaki is Asuma's assistant and is the first person that Hibiki meets from Kamisaid Magic Academy. When Hibiki makes a mistake, Misaki lectures her and informs her how a member of the faculty should act, even when it may not entirely be her fault. Due to Hibiki's low magical experience, Misaki worries about Hibiki succeeding as a member of the staff. Like Hibiki, Misaki cannot perform magic, though she still has a vast knowledge of magic at her disposal. She had been adopted by a man that constantly abused her and the only thing that could cheer her up was a book from a magic user. She had been saved by Asuma and hopes to be of use to him.
Ikko^{[A]} (イッコ)
Ikko is a female teacher at Kamisaid Magic Academy whose specialty is curses. While normally a sweet, young woman, her personality becomes sinister when she is performing her curses. She shows a skill in sewing when she is asked by Hibiki to make new clothes for Shiraasan.
Yukko^{[A]} (ユッコ)
Yukko is a woman around the same age as Ikko, her older sister. Yukko lost her young daughter Nanako in the last war, and since then has spent all her time researching how to make a homunculus in human form, though has never been able to produce one that looks human. After the incident with Shiraasan, Yukko is finally able to accept her daughter's death and ceases to make more homunculi. Yukko sacrificed her slumber for her magic.
Nazuna Shireiyu (ナズナ=シレイユ)
Nazuna is a young girl whose grandfather is the king of the land of Kamisaid. She is a skilled sword-fighter, but is followed by the dead spirits of baby chicks, who believe her to be their mother, and rest on her, thus interfering in her sword-training. Hibiki is able to help her initially by making some of them disappear, though the chicks come back.

== Production and release ==
The manga series Hibiki's Magic is written by Jun Maeda and illustrated by Rei Izumi. As stated at the back of the first volume, Maeda first conceived Hibiki's Magic as a short story he wrote as a student, and the story contains an unspecified theme that he has carried through a lot of stories since. In 2003, he wanted to collaborate with Izumi, one of his favorite artists, and remembered his earlier concept that would become Hibiki's Magic. After Izumi drew some early character designs for Hibiki, Maeda wanted to continue the story and start a manga with Izumi as the artist.

The manga premiered in the August 2004 issue of Kadokawa Shoten's Shōnen Ace. It was later transferred to Kadokawa Shoten's Comp Ace magazine on November 26, 2005. Hibiki's Magic went on hiatus after the release of Comp Ace volume 15 on May 26, 2007, during which only three chapters were released: the first in Comp Ace's August 2008 issue, next as a bonus chapter in the September 2008 issue of Comp Ace, and finally in a special edition of the magazine's July 2011 issue titled Key Station. The manga resumed regular publication with the April 2013 issue of Comp Ace, and concluded with the May 2016 issue. Kadokawa Shoten published six tankōbon volumes from August 10, 2005, to February 25, 2017.

At the 2006 San Diego Comic-Con, Tokyopop announced that it had acquired Hibiki's Magic for distribution in English in North America. Tokyopop released the first volume on January 9, 2007, followed by the second volume on September 11, 2007. Viz Media re-released the two volumes published by Tokyopop digitally starting in October 2015. Kadokawa Media licensed the series in Chinese.

No.	Original release date	Original ISBN	North American release date	North American ISBN
1	August 10, 2005	978-4-04713-713-4	January 9, 2007	978-1-59816-766-5
01. "The Magic of Transposition" (転位のマホウ, Teni no Mahō); 02. "The Magic That Cannot Heal" (Part 1) (癒えないマホウ (前編), "Ienai Mahō" (zenpen)); 03. "The Magic That Cannot Heal" (Part 2) (癒えないマホウ (後編), "Ienai Mahō" (kōhen)); 04. "The Magic of Life" (Part 1) (生命のマホウ (前編), "Seimei no Mahō" (zenpen)); 05. "The Magic of Life" (Part 2) (生命のマホウ (中編), "Seimei no Mahō" (chūhen)); 06. "The Magic of Life" (Part 3) (生命のマホウ (後編), "Seimei no Mahō" (kōhen)); Side Story: "Even If I Forget You" (ぼくがきみをわすれても, "Boku ga Kimi o Wasuretemo")
2	December 26, 2006	978-4-04713-866-7	September 11, 2007	978-1-42780-458-7
07. "The Magic That Protects All" (失わないためのマホウ, "Ushinawanai Tame no Mahō"); 08. "The Magic of the Cursed Item" (呪具のマホウ, "Jugu no Mahō"); 09. "The Magic of the Heart" (伝心のマホウ, "Tsute no Mahō"); 10. "The Magic of the Demon" (悪魔のマホウ, "Akuma no Mahō"); 11. "The Magic That Saves" (救うためのマホウ, "Sukū Tame no Mahō"); Bonus Story: "Our Beginning Song" (きみとぼくのはじまりのうた, "Kimi to Boku no Hajimari no Uta")
3	February 26, 2014	978-4-04120-827-4	—	—
12. "The Magic of Living Weapons" (生命兵器のマホウ, "Seimei Heiki no Mahō"); 13. "The Magic of Blessing" (祝福のマホウ, "Shukufuku no Mahō"); 14. "The Magic of Warmth" (温もりのマホウ, "Nukumori no Mahō"); 15. "The Magic of a Single Night" (一夜のマホウ, "Ichiya no Mahō"); 16. "The Magic of Sketching" (らくがきのマホウ, "Rakugaki no Mahō"); Bonus Story: "Your Gift to Me" (きみがぼくにくれたもの, "Kimi ga Boku ni Kureta Mono")
4	February 26, 2015	978-4-04-102548-2	—	—
5	February 25, 2017	978-4-04-105227-3	—	—
6	February 25, 2017	978-4-04-105228-0	—	—

== Reception ==
Anime News Network's (ANN) review of the first volume states that "Hibiki's Magic...focus[es] on the ways that magic effects the everyday lives of its users. The personal focus is welcome, but the book is a little too compressed and rushed to evoke exactly the emotional response that it desires." While at the same time describing the first volume as having an "inspirational tone", the review ends by saying, "Don't come to Hibiki's Magic expecting a life-changing re-examination of magic. It's a heavy dose of pure cuteness for those who like their sweet-and-sour drama with lots of cheese." The first volume of Hibiki's Magic was featured in ANN's Right Turn Only column in January 2007, where Carlo Santos compares the series to "Someday's Dreamers with more guts and heart," which portrays magicians as similar to normal people with "weaknesses and all" as opposed to "other tales of magic [which] focus on how cool and different magicians are [compared to normal people]." Visually, the series is described as being too similar to "every other fantasy series" and even cites similarities with "Hogwarts' magic robes and school logo." IGN Comics' review said, "This book ought to be fairly popular for its intended age group....Make no mistake, this book is cute in every sense of the word...but at the same time it's a solid story that breaks out of that cuteness mold."

In a review at Comic Book Bin, the reviewer Leroy Douresseaux praised Jun Maeda for crafting a "gentle, yet highly engaging story about deep friendship and strong love and devotion." Douresseaux also cited Rei Izumi's art as "cute" and how her "visuals are also emotionally potent." In a review at Mania, Michelle Ramonetti follows with other reviewers, citing the series as "deceptively cute", but also describing it as "often funny, but mostly bittersweet--and a real tear-jerker." The manga's theme is thought to be related to "finding hope in times of pain and grief." In the online appendix to Manga: The Complete Guide, Jason Thompson cites Hibiki's Magic as "a cross between Someday's Dreamers and Atelier Marie and Elie," though describes it as being "less optimistic than Someday's Dreamers." Thompson goes on to pan the manga as a "dull moe title" with "crude, generic art."

== Notes ==
- ^{A} In Tokyopop's release of the series, Ikko's and Yukko's names were transliterated incorrectly. In the original katakana script, each name has a sokuon in it, denoting a gemination (doubling) of the consonant that follows the sokuon; in this case, the second 'k' in both Ikko and Yukko. In Tokyopop's release, the sokuon was treated as a tsu sound, resulting in Ikko's name rendered as Itsuko and Yukko's name rendered as Yutsuko.
