= Stellar Theater =

2009 Japanese visual novel

ステラ シアター (Sutera Shiatā)
- Manga
- Illustrated by: Waki
- Magazine: Comp Ace
- Original run: March 26, 2009 – present
- Video game
- Developer: Rosebleu
- Publisher: Rosebleu (PC); Cyberfront (PSP/PSVita)
- Genre: Eroge, Romance
- Platform: PC; PSP; PSVita
- Released: June 26, 2009 (PC); February 28, 2013 (PSP/PSVita)

Stellar Theater (ステラ シアター, Sutera Shiatā) is a Japanese visual novel by Rosebleu. It was first released for PC on June 26, 2009. A manga adaptation based on the game began serialization on March 26, 2009, in Comp Ace. A fandisc, Stellar Theater Encore, came out June 24, 2011. A version of the game for PlayStation Portable was released in February 2013 by Cyberfront; both a physical release, and a download release compatible with the PlayStation Vita. The PSP version removes sexual content but adds a new character and has a different opening animation.

== Development ==
The character designs of Stellar Theater are done by Hiro Suzuhira.
