= The Do-Over Damsel Conquers the Dragon Emperor =

Japanese light novel series and its adaptations

- First light novel volume cover

やり直し令嬢は竜帝陛下を攻略中 (Yarinaoshi Reijō wa Ryūtei Heika o Kōryaku-chū)
- Genre: Fantasy; Romance; Sword and sorcery
- Novel series
- Written by: Sarasa Nagase
- Published by: Shōsetsuka ni Narō
- Original run: November 2, 2019 – present
- Light novel
- Written by: Sarasa Nagase
- Illustrated by: Mitsuya Fuji
- Published by: Kadokawa Shoten
- English publisher: NA: Cross Infinite World
- Imprint: Kadokawa Beans Bunko
- Original run: March 1, 2020 – present
- Volumes: 10 + 2 short story collection
- Manga
- Written by: Sarasa Nagase
- Illustrated by: Anko Yuzu
- Published by: Kadokawa Shoten
- English publisher: NA: Yen Press
- Magazine: Comp Ace
- Original run: July 27, 2020 – present
- Volumes: 10
- Anime television series
- Directed by: Kentarō Suzuki
- Produced by: Kiyoka Ueda; Gou Kodama; Yuuto Onuma; Chiho Shibayama; Nao Matsumura; Shuka Nishimae
- Written by: Atsuo Ishino
- Music by: Shūhei Mutsuki
- Studio: J.C.Staff
- Licensed by: Crunchyroll
- Original network: AT-X, Tokyo MX, BS NTV, Kansai TV
- English network: SEA: Animax Asia
- Original run: October 9, 2024 – December 25, 2024
- Episodes: 12
- icon

The Do-Over Damsel Conquers the Dragon Emperor (Japanese: やり直し令嬢は竜帝陛下を攻略中, Hepburn: Yarinaoshi Reijō wa Ryūtei Heika o Kōryaku-chū) is a Japanese light novel series written by Sarasa Nagase and illustrated by Mitsuya Fuji. It began serialization online in November 2019 on the user-generated novel publishing website Shōsetsuka ni Narō. It was later acquired by Kadokawa Shoten, which has published nine volumes since March 2020 under its Kadokawa Beans Bunko imprint. A manga adaptation with art by Anko Yuzu has been serialized in Kadokawa Shoten's seinen manga magazine Comp Ace since July 2020. It has been collected in ten tankōbon volumes. An anime television series adaptation produced by J.C.Staff first season aired from October to December 2024.

== Synopsis ==
Jill Cervel, a noblewoman and warrior from the borderlines between the Kingdom of Kratos and Empire of Rave, is engaged to Crown Prince Gerald and she sacrifices her youth in honing sword arts and magic. She participated in countless battles to input a standstill in any forthcoming civil wars. However, after discovering Gerald's incestuous relationship with his sister, Jill is framed and publicly chased to escape from execution. She is suddenly lunged upon a clockwork lance that sends her back five years to the day of Gerald's propose of marriage to her. After regressing, to avoid suffering the same fate, she impulsively proposes to the dashing Emperor Hadis Teos Rave, who was supposed to become her future enemy. Yet, Jill will soon find she may have made the better choice.

== Characters ==
Jill Cervel (ジル・サーヴェル, Jiru Sāveru)
Voiced by: Azumi Waki (voice drama), Shu Uchida (anime)
The daughter of a noble family and the heroine. Skilled in magic and raised as a knight, she would initially be betrothed to Prince Gerard. However, after being framed for a false crime, she would meet an untimely end by his hand. In her dying breath, after expressing regrets over her choices in life she eventually found herself back in the past, at the moment Gerard would choose his bride-to-be. In an impulsive attempt to change her future, she would declare her love towards Emperor Hadis, the man that would be her enemy in the previous timeline.
Hadis Teos Rave (ハディス・テオス・ラーヴェ, Hadisu Teosu Rāve)
Voiced by: Takuya Satō (voice drama), Kikunosuke Toya (anime)
The nineteen-year-old emperor of the Empire of Rave. In the previous timeline, he had a tormented past due to circumstances that led to the deaths of future title holders. After being exiled from the capital, Hadis encountered Jill when she swore to stop him from becoming a threat across the borders. In the new timeline, he is rather gullible to love after Jill inadvertently declared her proposal to him.
Rave (ラーヴェ, Rāve)
Voiced by: Shiori Izawa
Gerard (ジェラルド, Jerarudo)
Voiced by: Shun'ichi Toki
The prince of the Kratos Kingdom, at his fifteen birthday he proposed to Jill to be married in the future. However, he only saw Jill as a pawn and wanted to marry so he can use her for his goals and has a forbidden love with his little sister Faris. When Jill discovered their transgression, he broke off their betrothal and falsely accused Jill for trying to kill his sister so she will get executed to hide his and sister's honor. In the new timeline, he still tries to propose Jill, but Jill had proposed to Hadis instead, thus changing the timeline of events.
Camila (カミラ, Kamira)
Voiced by: Mari Hino
Zeke (ジーク, Jīku)
Voiced by: Tatsumaru Tachibana
Sphere (スフィア, Sufia)
Voiced by: Yuka Nukui
Faris (フェイリス, Feirisu)
Voiced by: Ayumi Mano
Gerard's little sister and the princess of the Kratos kingdom. She is engaged in a forbidden and incestuous relationship with her brother.
Elincia (エリンツィア, Erintsia)
Voiced by: Kaori Nazuka
Listeard (リステアード, Risuteādo)
Voiced by: Makoto Furukawa

== Media ==
=== Light novel ===
Written by Sarasa Nagase, The Do-Over Damsel Conquers the Dragon Emperor originally began serialization on the Shōsetsuka ni Narō website on November 2, 2019. It was later acquired by Kadokawa Shoten, who began publishing the series with illustrations by Mitsuya Fuji on March 1, 2020, under their Kadokawa Beans Bunko imprint. As of October 2026, ten volumes and two short story volumes have been released.

In December 2022, Cross Infinite World announced that it had licensed the novels for an English release.

No.	Original release date	Original ISBN	English release date	English ISBN
1	March 1, 2020	978-4-04-108963-7	March 28, 2023 (digital); May 31, 2023 (print)	979-8-88560-037-8
2	October 1, 2020	978-4-04-109848-6	June 30, 2023 (digital); August 20, 2023 (print)	979-8-88560-039-2
3	February 27, 2021	978-4-04-111135-2	September 29, 2023 (digital); October 18, 2023 (print)	979-8-88560-041-5
4	April 1, 2022	978-4-04-112323-2	May 31, 2024 (digital); September 11, 2024 (print)	979-8-88560-115-3
5	September 30, 2022	978-4-04-112996-8	August 30, 2024 (digital); October 8, 2024 (print)	979-8-88560-117-7
6	April 28, 2023	978-4-04-113651-5	September 30, 2024 (digital); December 16, 2024 (print)	979-8-88560-119-1
SS1	February 1, 2024	978-4-04-114576-0	September 30, 2025 (digital); April 28, 2026 (print)	979-8-88560-180-1
7	October 1, 2024	978-4-04-115079-5	June 30, 2025 (digital); October 19, 2025 (print)	979-8-88560-178-8
SS2	November 1, 2024	978-4-04-115442-7	November 30, 2025 (digital); August 29, 2026 (print)	979-8-88560-199-3
8	August 1, 2025	978-4-04-116160-9	—	—
9	April 1, 2026	978-4-04-117280-3	—	—
10	August 1, 2026	978-4-04-117797-6	—	—

=== Manga ===
A manga adaptation illustrated by Anko Yuzu began serialization in Kadokawa Shoten's Comp Ace magazine on July 27, 2020. As of March 2026, ten tankōbon volumes have been released. In February 2023, Yen Press licensed the manga in English.

No.	Original release date	Original ISBN	English release date	English ISBN
1	October 26, 2020	978-4-04-110814-7	August 22, 2023	978-1-9753-6042-9
2	August 26, 2021	978-4-04-111671-5	December 12, 2023	978-1-9753-6044-3
3	March 26, 2022	978-4-04-111800-9	April 16, 2024	978-1-9753-6046-7
4	December 26, 2022	978-4-04-113250-0	August 20, 2024	978-1-9753-8969-7
5	July 25, 2023	978-4-04-113897-7	March 25, 2025	978-1-9753-9476-9
6	January 26, 2024	978-4-04-113899-1	October 21, 2025	979-8-8554-0397-8
7	July 25, 2024	978-4-04-115220-1	April 28, 2026	979-8-8554-1913-9
8	December 26, 2024	978-4-04-115599-8	April 27, 2027	979-8-8554-3040-0
9	September 24, 2025	978-4-04-116481-5	—	—
10	March 26, 2026	978-4-04-117092-2	—	—
11	December 24, 2026	978-4-04-117883-6	—	—

=== Anime ===
An anime adaptation was announced on April 28, 2023, later revealed to be a television series. It is produced by J.C.Staff and directed by Kentarō Suzuki, with Atsuo Ishino overseeing series scripts, and Sana Komatsu designing the characters. The first season of the series aired from October 9 to December 25, 2024, on AT-X and other networks. The opening theme song is "Awaku Kasuka" (淡く微か; Faintly Dim), performed by sajou no hana, while the ending theme song is "Gradation", performed by HaNaTan. Crunchyroll streamed the series.

==== Episodes ====
No.	Title	Directed by (Note: Production staff information is taken from the ending credits of each episode.)	Written by	Storyboarded by	Original release date
1	"I Tried to Avoid the Route to Destruction and Somehow Ended Up Courting My Greatest Enemy"; Transliteration: "Hametsu Rūto o Sakeyou to Omottara, Nazeka Saidai no Teki ni Kyūkon Shitemashita" (Japanese: 破滅ルートを避けようと思ったら、何故か最大の敵に求婚してました)	Ishida Miyuki	Atsuo Ishino	Kentarō Suzuki	October 9, 2024
Jill Cervel, the 16-year-old daughter of a minor noble family, is killed attempting to escape after being sentenced to death by her fiancé Gerald der Kratos, the 21-year-old prince of the Kratos Kingdom, on false charges after finding out that Gerald was in a forbidden romantic relationship with his sister Faris. Filled with thoughts of regret for becoming engaged to Gerald in her final moment, she finds herself six years in the past right before she became Gerald's fiancé at his 15th birthday party. Desperate to not become Gerald's fiancé, Jill confesses her love with a random person not knowing that the person would go on to become kingdom's greatest enemy, the emperor of the Rave Empire Hadis Teos Rave. Hadis brings Jill to his ship on the way to Rave. Jill asks about why Hadis accepted her confession despite the age difference as Hadis was attracted to her great magical power. Jill then tells Hadis that the marriage proposal was just a lie to get out of marrying Gerald, and the dragon god Rave appears before the two. But Jill decides she wants to go through with the marriage hoping to steer Hadis away from his path of darkness.
2	"I Already Know the Tragedy That Is to Come, so I Will Do What I Can to Avoid It"; Transliteration: "Korekara Okiru Higeki mo Sudeni Shitte Itanode, Dōnika Kaihi Shitai to Omoimasu" (Japanese: これから起きる悲劇も既に知っていたので、どうにか回避したいと思います)	Kim Seungdeok	Atsuo Ishino	Kentarō Suzuki	October 16, 2024
With Jill and Hadis agreeing to get married, Rave gives Jill a Dragon Consort's Ring as proof of their relationship. The ship comes under attack, and Jill uses her power to launch it safely into the harbor in the town of Beilburg in the Rave Empire. At the harbor, Jill finds out that only she and Hadis can see Rave, while also meeting Sphere de Beil, the daughter of a marquess and one of Hadis' potential fiancés who went on a murder-suicide rampage in the original timeline after Hadis returned from Kratos. Hadis explains to Jill that he is known as the cursed emperor because all the princes ahead of him in the line of succession mysteriously died. The next day, Jill goes out disguised as a boy to gather information about Sphere and learns that Kratos soldiers have infiltrated Rave. The soldiers kidnap Sphere, while Marquess Beil lies to Hadis about Jill being a spy and the one responsible for the infiltration. Jill is imprisoned with Sphere, and Sphere explains that she was a loner due to her ability to see dragons that others could not, but Hadis reached out to her and even defended her from her father. She fell in love with him but got rejected for Jill. Jill figures out that Marquess Beil orchestrated Sphere's kidnapping to frame Jill for kidnapping Sphere and decides that she needs to expose the marquess for his crimes. Soon afterwards, Zeke and Camila, Jill's would-be bodyguards who were killed in the original timeline, arrive to rescue the two.
3	"The Situation Is Desperate, but as the God of War's Daughter, I Will Defeat the Enemy with Brute Strength"; Transliteration: "Zetsubō-teki Jōkyōdeshitaga Gunshin Reijōnanode, Butsuri de Musō Shite Yarou to Omoimasu" (Japanese: 絶望的状況でしたが軍神令嬢なので、物理で無双してやろうと思います)	Shigeki Awai	Atsuo Ishino	Kentarō Suzuki	October 23, 2024
Piecing together the information from Jill, Sphere, Camila, and Zeke, the group figures out that Marquess Beil hired ruffians to disguise as soldiers from the northern forces to disgrace them and erode the emperor's reputation so that the marquess can rise to power, all while intending to sacrifice Sphere for that objective. After realizing that the purpose of Sphere's murder-suicide was to protect the disgraced northern forces that Camila and Zeke are part of that led to them coming to Kratos in the original timeline, Jill reveals herself and comes up with a plan to save everybody. Jill asks Sphere to formally accuse her father, while telling her that she is married to Hadis in name only. Jill puts the plan into action by using her power to break the castle walls and rescue the captured soldiers. After coming into contact with Hugo, the leader of the ruffians, Jill comes up with a plan to pretend to get captured and overpowers Hugo and the ruffians, while the freed soldiers destroy the ruffian ships in the port and Zeke stops the priest from stabbing Sphere. Shortly afterwards Marquess Beil arrives and has a dragon attack Jill and company, but Hadis arrives to override Marquess Beil's orders to the dragon.
4	"My Fiancé is Trying His Best to Woo Me and I Don't Know What to Do About It"; Transliteration: "Konyaku Aite ga Honki de Kudoite Kurunode, Taisho Hōhō ga Tonikaku Wakarimasen" (Japanese: 婚約相手が本気で口説いてくるので、対処方法がとにかく分かりません)	Masashi Tsukino	Tatsuhiko Urahata	Kо̄ichi Takada	October 30, 2024
Hadis sends the dragon away and threatens Hugo over his failure to understand the duty of the northern forces. Hugo orders his men to bow, and he informs Hadis that Marquess Beil orchestrated the incident, leading to his arrest. That night, Jill heads to her new bedroom and finds Hadis hung over after drinking wine. Hadis asks Jill to feed him apples, but has to cut them himself after Jill struggles to cut them. Jill thanks Hadis for not executing the marquess, and the two have a romantic conversation before Jill falls asleep. The next day, Camila and Zeke are assigned to be Jill's bodyguards, and Jill tells that them that while she and Hadis are a married couple, the marriage is just for show. Zeke sees the ring and explains that she has been cursed by the goddess Kratos. Camila explains the story of the goddess Kratos and dragon god Rave as the two lands they governed were cursed and separated by a magic shield but became prosperous when they married. Sphere delivers Jill a letter written by Gerald that tells her that he is coming to take her back to Kratos.
5	"When Seeking the Truth, Things Turned into an Argument, so I Can No Longer Do Anything"; Transliteration: "Shinjitsu o Shirou to Shita Tokoro Kenka ni Nattanode, Watashi wa Nani mo Dekinaku Narimashita" (Japanese: 真実を知ろうとしたところ喧嘩になったので、私は何もできなくなりました)	Taisuke Kurose	Atsuo Ishino	Taisuke Kurose	November 6, 2024
With Gerald coming to Rave to see if she has become Hadis' dragon consort, Jill struggles to make her unofficial relationship look convincing in preparation for his arrival. Jill, Hadis, and Gerald discuss the matter. Jill tells Gerald that Hadis needs her since she can see the dragon god, and in response Gerald will break that dependency. The conversation is interrupted with news of Marquess Beil's apparent death that convinces the civilians that the emperor's curse is active. Afterwards, Camila and Zeke further explain the myth about the goddess and dragon god as due to the magic shield separating the lands, the goddess transformed into the Sacred Spear to bypass the shield, and when presented by Kratos to the emperor, she impaled the dragon consort. In response, the consort stabbed herself with the Heavenly Sword to trap the goddess in her own shadow that destroyed the curse. Sphere, possessed by the shadow of the goddess, attacks Jill before Hadis knocks her out and tells Jill that he does not see her as his wife. He orders Camila and Zeke to bring the women to the palace and kill any who disobey. As Sphere recently turned 14, Jill understands that Hadis wanted somebody under 14 to be his wife to avoid marrying a vessel for the goddess. That night, riots engulf Beilburg as Hadis kills a rebel soldier seeking vengeance for losing his wife and daughter. Hadis goes out to kill the rebels, all while Rave traps Jill behind a magic shield to prevent her from interfering.
6	"Upstarts Are Attempting to Get Close to My Fiancé and I Want to Beat Them at Their Own Game"; Transliteration: "Konyaku Aite ni Chikayoru Tomogara ga Itanode, Kaeriuchi ni Shiteyaritai to Omoimasu" (Japanese: 婚約相手に近寄る輩がいたので、返り討ちにしてやりたいと思います)	Shūji Miyazaki	Tatsuhiko Urahata	Iku Suzuki	November 13, 2024
In addition to protecting Jill from the goddess targeting her, the magic shield also blocks everybody's memories of her. Meanwhile Camila and Zeke are on lookout and sees that Marquess Beil is trying to escape to Kratos after faking his death. With Jill knowing that a war between Rave and Kratos will happen if she does nothing, Jill decides that she needs to destroy the spear that carries a piece of the goddess' soul, and Rave reveals himself to be the Heavenly Sword. Jill shatters the shield with the sword and rings the bell at the central tower to draw the goddess to her, while telling Hadis that he needs to do what an emperor is supposed to do. The spear flies towards Jill to fight her. Jill recognizes the spear as the same one that killed her in the original timeline, getting her to realize that it was the goddess who sent her back in time. Jill breaks the spear to defeat the goddess. Exhausted from fighting the goddess, Gerald swoops in to kidnap her, but Hadis comes to the rescue. Hadis sends Gerald flying towards the Rakia Mountains that border Rave and Kratos. Afterwards, Jill attempts to confess her love to Hadis but says her true feelings of disinterest first causing Hadis to faint. That night, Jill makes another attempt, but realizes that she is not ready to confess at the moment.
7	"I Want to Stop Living the Slow Life, so I Have Decided to Start in the Dragon Knights"; Transliteration: "Surō Raifu Seikatsu o Owara Setainode, Ryū Kishi-dan Hajimeru Koto ni Shimashita" (Japanese: スローライフ生活を終わらせたいので、竜騎士団始めることにしました)	Miyuki Ishida	Atsuo Ishino	Kо̄ichi Takada	November 20, 2024
Jill dreams of the time in her original timeline when Kratos took Elentzia Teos Rave, the first princess of Rave, prisoner. The next morning, Jill and Hadis travel to Rahelm, the capital of Rave, with Camila and Zeke accompanying them. Upon arriving at Rahelm, Hadis' uncle George Teos Rave attacks and wounds Jill and Hadis with the real Heavenly Sword, notifying him that he does not recognize Hadis as the Dragon Emperor. Rave teleports Jill and Hadis to safety in a village inside the Duchy of Neutrahl, a neutral territory on the border of Kratos, but it causes Rave to disappear, all while Jill and Hadis had their magic energy sealed. Jill recalls that George would go on to raise his own army and initiate the False Emperor Rebellion having declared Hadis a false emperor. The four settle in an abandoned home in Neutrahl, laying low until their energy returns in about half a year. One month later, news arrives that George has ordered the lords of each region to search for Hadis. In response, Jill and Zeke decide to join the Dragon Knights in order to gather intel and head for town. Jill sees a dragon and attacks it at its weak point, not realizing that it was a test for applicants. Afterwards, the captain of the Dragon Knights arrives, revealed to be Elentzia, and in the original timeline she committed suicide after being captured.
8	"I, the Dragon Consort, am Now Hated by the Dragon and I Want to Find a Way to Be Friendly Again"; Transliteration: "Ryū-hi no Watashi ga Ryū ni Kirawarete Shimattanode, Dōnika Nakayoku Naritai to Omoimasu" (Japanese: 竜妃の私が竜に嫌われてしまったので、どうにか仲良くなりたいと思います)	Masashi Tsukino	Tatsuhiko Urahata	Shinpei Nagai	November 27, 2024
Jill and Zeke begin training as members of the Dragon Knights with Elentzia explaining how scale and eye colors determine rank. Elentzia has her dragon Rosa do a compatibility test and Rosa attacks Jill, causing her to come home dejected. Hadis cheers Jill up, vowing to fight Rosa if nothing else. The next day, Jill is assigned to town patrol duty and spots Lawrence Marton, who was the aide-de-camp in the original timeline who always made correct decisions. As Lawrence tries to tell Jill a rumor, the second prince Risteard Teos Rave arrives asking Jill to deliver a message from Elentzia. After telling her the message, Elentzia tells Jill she and Risteard both believe that Hadis is the true emperor, but they cannot support him because their grandfathers, Duke Neutrahl and Duke Lehrsatz respectively, do not recognize Hadis as emperor having both lost a crown prince to the curse. She also tells Jill that Rosa sees Jill as her equal or a threat through her actions. Afterwards, Risteard has Jill greet his dragon, Brynhild. The dragon flees out of fear, causing Risteard to question who Jill is since the only other time Brynhild fled was when she met Hadis. At the end of the day, Jill returns home with Risteard having followed her, which Jill admits was on purpose knowing that he can be trusted. Hadis and Risteard engage in a shouting match after seeing that Hadis had been gardening.
9	"My Fiance and I Nearly Ripped Each Other to Shreds and It May Still End up Being a Bloodbath"; Transliteration: "Kon'yaku Aite to Shuraba ni Nari Kakemashitaga, Yappari Shuraba ni Narisōdesu" (Japanese: 婚約相手と修羅場になりかけましたが、やっぱり修羅場になりそうです)	Takaaki Ishiyama	Tatsuhiko Urahata	Iku Suzuki; Shinpei Nagai	December 4, 2024
Risteard and Jill bring Hadis over to see Elentzia to fill him in on the situation. To figure out where their allegiances lie, Jill asks for aid, then take Elentzia and Risteard hostage. But before they could get an answer, one of Elentzia's knights informs her that George has set the village on fire. The dragons quickly put out the fire while the village was evacuated resulting in no deaths. Afterwards, Risteard and Elentzia express their support for Hadis, and Elentzia brings Hadis to meet Gerald's sister Faris der Kratos, who had come to Rave to propose that she marries Hadis because she has six years before becoming a vessel for the goddess, and to use the engagement to resolve tensions between Kratos and Rave. However, Faris acted in secrecy because of Gerald's overprotectiveness. With the imperial forces issuing a proclamation, Jill tells Hadis to go through with the engagement so that Elentzia can mobilize her dragon knights, with Hadis just needing to refuse the betrothal. After Faris leaves, Hadis cooks dinner while Elentzia tells him that she got in contact with his brother Vissel and that Risteard's sister Frida is safe. Afterwards, Hadis becomes frightened that Jill is cheating on him because he heard a rumor that Jill and Lawrence fell in love, but Jill clears up the matter and tells him that she has been bullied by some of the dragon knights.
10	"As a Result of Doing-over My Life, I Find Myself Out of Options Once Again"; Transliteration: "Jinsei Yarinaoshita Kekka, Matamoya Jinsei Tsumi Kakete Shimaimashita" (Japanese: 人生やり直した結果、またもや人生詰みかけてしまいました)	Masashi Tsukino	Tatsuhiko Urahata	Shinpei Nagai	December 11, 2024
With Vissel having dispatched the troops under the pretense of looking for Hadis, Elentzia instructs Hadis and Risteard to meet up with them at the handover location. Jill makes the two-day expedition to the location with Hadis, Zeke, Camilla, Risteard, and Lawrence and along the way, Jill explains that his relationship with Lawrence is meant to serve as a distraction. That night with the party camping for the night, Lawrence warns Zeke and Camilla that the plan is possibly a trap and review a contingency plan in that scenario to pass onto Jill. In that situation, the party is to head over to the dragon's nest to regroup. The next day, the party heads to the dragon's nest by following a dried-up river. At the nest, the party unexpectedly meets up with Elentzia, who reluctantly follows George's orders and had set up a trap there. Elentzia takes Jill hostage, and Hadis orders the rest of the party to retreat. Despite his magical power being sealed, Hadis easily deals with the Dragon Knights and jumps on Elentzia's dragon to free Jill while fighting George, but Jill gets attacked by the dragon's breath. While Hadis was fighting, the rest of the party retreats, but gets ambushed by George's troops. However, the stuffed bear and stuffed chicken that she brought along as a familiar saves them.
11	"My Fiancé's Uncle Is Behaving So Outrageously That I Can No Longer Stand Silently By"; Transliteration: "Konyaku Aite no Oji ga Muchakucha Sugitanode, Mohaya Damatte Misugosu Wake ni wa Ikimasen" (Japanese: 婚約相手の叔父が無茶苦茶すぎたので、もはや黙って見過ごすわけにはいきません)	Nana Fujiwara	Atsuo Ishino	Daisuke Kurose	December 18, 2024
Hadis is taken prisoner while Jill awakens inside the dragon's nest after being knocked out having been teleported there by a black dragon. However, the black dragon does not recognize Jill as the Dragon Consort and attacks her. Meanwhile, the remaining party members hide out at a nearby cave waiting until the enemy troops retreat. Jill figures out that George's Heavenly Sword was made from the Sacred Spear after learning from the black dragon that her magic is sealed by the goddess. Jill uses the magical eggshell she picked up to defeat the black dragon. She notices a black dragon egg that will hatch into a monster if the Dragon Emperor dies beforehand. Jill shows her conviction and obligation to protect Hadis, convincing the black dragon to allow her to ride on it and leave the nest. Jill rides the black dragon to the cave where Risteard and company are hiding to prepare for the counterattack. The party rides dragons that Risteard sent Brynhild to fetch and attack the enemy troops from above, while Jill engages in a fight with Elentzia. Jill's sword breaks, but refuses to surrender, while Risteard confronts Elentzia demanding her to explain why she betrayed Hadis. George suddenly appears and shows Risteard the family lineage scroll, revealing that Hadis is not a blood relative of the since his parents are Vissel's mother and a guard and thus, the imperial family is not descended from the Dragon Emperor and are at risk of being executed as scapegoats should the rightful bloodline continue. It is revealed Elentzia hid the truth so Hadis and Risteard wouldn't feel the need to kill one another. As Jill prepares to engage in combat with George, Hadis suddenly appears.
12	"The Do-Over Damsel Conquers the Dragon Emperor"; Transliteration: "Yarinaoshi Reijō wa Ryūtei Heika o Kōryaku-chū" (Japanese: やり直し令嬢は竜帝陛下を攻略中)	Miyuki Ishida; Hikaru Tanaka	Atsuo Ishino	Kentarо̄ Suzuki	December 25, 2024
Hadis goes berserk and tries to kill George, Elentzia, and Risteard, but Jill calms him down after promising to bear ten children with him and become a family with Elentzia and Risteard despite being unrelated by blood. George gets consumed by the fake Heavenly Sword and transforms into a one-eyed dragon intent on destroying the empire. Hadis fights George and slays him outside Rahelm. Half a month later in Rahelm, Jill's magic remains sealed despite the fake Heavenly Sword being destroyed, while Jill turns 11 years old, prompting Hadis to cancel the scheduled parade to throw a birthday party for Jill, but Jill tells Hadis that they can do both. Jill returns to Beilburg through Rave's teleportation to confront Faris, who is boarding a ship to Kratos, having figured out that Faris made the fake Heavenly Sword and Gerald gave it to George since her magic is still sealed. Faris reveals herself as the embodiment of the goddess who is aware of Jill's previous life. Jill declares that she will make Hadis happy and fights Faris using the Heavenly Sword against the Sacred Spear Faris retrieved after Jill broke it, but is overwhelmed forcing Rave to teleport her back to Rahelm. Hadis has his coronation ceremony where he declares his marriage to Jill, and Jill makes a sudden appearance to greet him.
