= The Villager of Level 999 =

Japanese light novel series

- First light novel volume cover featuring (from left to right) Alice, Kagami, and Rex

LV999の村人 (Lv999 no Murabito)
- Genre: Fantasy
- Novel series
- Written by: Koneko Hoshitsuki
- Published by: Shōsetsuka ni Narō
- Original run: July 14, 2015 – December 1, 2018
- Light novel
- Written by: Koneko Hoshitsuki
- Illustrated by: Fuumi
- Published by: Enterbrain
- Original run: April 30, 2016 – January 25, 2019
- Volumes: 8
- Manga

The Level 999 Villager
- Written by: Koneko Hoshitsuki
- Illustrated by: Kenichi Iwamoto
- Published by: Kadokawa Shoten
- English publisher: NA: Kadokawa
- Imprint: Kadokawa Comics A
- Magazine: Comp Ace
- Original run: May 26, 2017 – present
- Volumes: 21
- Anime television series
- Directed by: Yoshinobu Kasai
- Written by: Shinzō Fujita
- Music by: Hiroshi Nakamura
- Studio: Brain's Base
- Licensed by: Crunchyroll
- Original network: TV Tokyo, BS Fuji
- Original run: July 2, 2026 – September 17, 2026
- Episodes: 12
- icon

The Villager of Level 999 (Japanese: LV999の村人, Hepburn: Lv999 no Murabito) is a Japanese light novel series written by Koneko Hoshitsuki and illustrated by Fuumi. It was initially serialized on the user-generated novel publishing website Shōsetsuka ni Narō from July 2015 to December 2018, before being acquired and published by Enterbrain from April 2016 to January 2019. A manga adaptation illustrated by Kenichi Iwamoto began serialization in Kadokawa Shoten's seinen manga magazine Comp Ace in May 2017. An anime television series adaptation produced by Brain's Base aired from July to September 2026.

== Plot ==
Everyone is born with a class assigned to them. Their class—warrior, hero, magician, cleric, etc—determines the life they will live. Among these classes is the weakest: the villager. Villagers have no power; they are protected by the other classes. Koji Kagami is one of them. At the age of two, Kagami understood that money was the key to a better life, and that killing monsters was the fastest way to earn it. He spent 20 years killing monsters and reached level 999, despite the average level of villagers being 10.

== Characters ==
Koji Kagami (鏡 浩二, Kagami Koji)
Voiced by: Satoshi Inomata
Alice (アリス, Arisu)
Voiced by: Nao Tōyama
Takako (タカコ)
Voiced by: Hiroya Egashira
Rex (レックス, Rekkusu)
Voiced by: Nobunaga Shimazaki
Krull (クルル, Kururu)
Voiced by: Manaka Iwami
Tina (ティナ)
Voiced by: Aoi Koga
Paruna (パルナ)
Voiced by: Lynn
Menо̄ (メノウ)
Voiced by: Yūichirō Umehara
Militaria Remote (ミリタリア・リモート, Miritaria Rimōto)
Voiced by: Yōji Ueda
Dark Dragon (ダークドラゴン, Dāku Doragon)
Voiced by: Tetsu Inada

== Media ==
=== Light novel ===
Written by Koneko Hoshitsuki, The Villager of Level 999 was initially serialized on the user-generated novel publishing website Shōsetsuka ni Narō from July 14, 2015, to December 1, 2018, before being acquired and published by Enterbrain with illustrations by Fuumi in eight volumes, from April 30, 2016, to January 25, 2019.

No.	Release date	ISBN
1	April 30, 2016	978-4-04-734117-3
2	August 31, 2016	978-4-04-734286-6
3	December 28, 2016	978-4-04-734411-2
4	May 31, 2017	978-4-04-734666-6
5	September 30, 2017	978-4-04-734847-9
6	February 5, 2018	978-4-04-735026-7
7	July 5, 2018	978-4-04-735244-5
8	January 25, 2019	978-4-04-735417-3

=== Manga ===
A manga adaptation illustrated by Kenichi Iwamoto began serialization in Kadokawa Shoten's seinen manga magazine Comp Ace on May 26, 2017, with its chapters compiled into twenty-one tankōbon volumes as of July 2026.

The manga adaptation is published in English on Kadokawa's BookWalker website under the title The Level 999 Villager.

No.	Release date	ISBN
1	December 26, 2017	978-4-04-106300-2
2	February 26, 2018	978-4-04-106304-0
3	June 25, 2018	978-4-04-107063-5
4	January 25, 2019	978-4-04-107810-5
5	July 25, 2019	978-4-04-108472-4
6	December 26, 2019	978-4-04-108473-1
7	May 26, 2020	978-4-04-109627-7
8	October 26, 2020	978-4-04-109628-4
9	February 26, 2021	978-4-04-109629-1
10	August 26, 2021	978-4-04-111673-9
11	February 26, 2022	978-4-04-111799-6
12	August 26, 2022	978-4-04-112850-3
13	February 25, 2023	978-4-04-112851-0
14	May 26, 2023	978-4-04-113690-4
15	November 25, 2023	978-4-04-113691-1
16	February 26, 2024	978-4-04-113692-8
17	August 26, 2024	978-4-04-115218-8
18	February 26, 2025	978-4-04-115864-7
19	August 26, 2025	978-4-04-116480-8
20	February 25, 2026	978-4-04-117091-5
21	July 23, 2026	978-4-04-117678-8

=== Anime ===
An anime television series adaptation was announced on August 21, 2025. It is produced by Brain's Base and directed by Yoshinobu Kasai, with Shinzō Fujita supervising series scripts, Kentarō Matsumoto designing the characters, and Hiroshi Nakamura composing the music. The series aired from July 2 to September 17, 2026, on TV Tokyo and BS Fuji. (Note: TV Tokyo listed the series premiere on July 1 at 24:00, which is effectively July 2 at midnight JST.) The opening theme song is "Not a Hero", performed by Nakuru Aitsuki and Itsuki Natsume, while the ending theme song is "HP", performed by Yukimura. Crunchyroll is streaming the series.

==== Episodes ====
No.	Title	Directed by (Note: Production staff information is taken from the ending credits of each episode.)	Written by	Storyboarded by	Original release date
1	"How the World Works"; Transliteration: "Sekai no Shikumi" (Japanese: 世界の仕組み)	Yoshinobu Kasai	Shinzō Fujita	Yoshinobu Kasai	July 2, 2026
In Hexaldria, (formerly Japan) human's lives are dictated by their class and level. 99% are Villagers below Level 10, but there are rare classes such as Mage, Warrior and Merchant, and the extremely rare Sage, Hero and King classes. Koji is a Villager who has achieved Level 999 by hunting monsters for 20 years. Rex the Hero and Princess Kannazuki the Sage recruit party members to slay the Demon King, though Rex rejects strong candidates in favour of pretty young women; Tina the Priest and Parna the Mage. A red-haired girl with demon horns seeks a Hero sword in the Ancient Cavern, where Koji is hunting demons for money. When Rex arrives and finds the sword missing, he blames the girl and attacks. Koji easily blocks the whole party's strikes and falsely claims the girl is his sister and her horns hair accessories. When Rex demands the sword which only a Level 90 Hero can lift, Koji admits years ago he lifted it with brute strength and sold it for cash. Shocked Koji is Level 999, Kannazuki demands he atone by joining their quest. Koji refuses; he only cares about money, has no grudge against the Demon King, and rejects Kannazuki's marriage offer. Leaving Rex with a warning to learn how the world really works, Koji departs. The girl reveals she wishes Koji to be her husband.
2	"The Ultimate Idiot"; Transliteration: "Saikō ni Baka Dakara" (Japanese: 最高に馬鹿だから)	Masashi Okubo & Yoshinobu Kasai	Shinzō Fujita	Minoru Ōhara	July 9, 2026 (Note: From Episode 2, episodes are released on ABEMA, DMM TV and Crunchyroll a week before their televised airings.)
Alice clarifies she intends to marry Koji in three years when she is old enough. She must keep the sword away from the Hero to prevent him killing her ill father, the Demon King, as she ultimately hopes to foster human-demon coexistence. Koji argues this is impossible because demon horns emit monster-creating miasma. However, moved by her determination, Koji wraps Alice's horns in a special material that safely neutralizes her mana and stops the miasma. Alice also asks Koji to buy a Spirit Blessing potion for her father's illness to prevent an indiscriminate human war against all demons. Learning the potion costs a staggering ten gold coins, Koji offers to buy it and escort her home if the Demon King repays him fifteen gold. He hires his friend Takako, a Level 124 Monk who harbours no grudge against demons after one saved her life. When Alice asks how Koji reached Level 999, Takako hints he lacks a fundamental human limitation. Suddenly, a demon named Menow drops Bloody Buffer monsters onto Valham City, declaring war. As Rex rallies adventurers to fight the flying monsters, Koji intervenes to protect innocent Villagers from being hit by the falling monsters. Alice identifies Menow as her father's loyal servant, prompting Koji to leap into the sky to confront him.
3	"Demon and Human Coesistence"; Transliteration: "Mazoku to Ningen no Kyōzon" (Japanese: 魔族と人間の共存)	Seiya Ishida	Yukiko Sakagami & Shinzō Fujita	Masaharu Okuwaki	July 16, 2026
Koji denies being an enemy of the Demon King, citing his friendship with the King's daughter, Alice. When Menow claims his attack was ordered by the Demon King, Koji counters that Alice described her father as bedridden. Menow remembers the order came from the King's aide, prompting him to retreat out of fear the Demon King is being manipulated. Koji decides to accompany Menow in the morning to uncover the truth, despite risking the hatred of both races. Rex and his party attempt to arrest Menow for the attack and Koji as a traitor. Koji insists humans and demons could coexist if not for the demon's inability to stop producing monster-generating miasma from their horns. Rex's party tries to stop them, but Koji, Menow, Alice, and Takaka easily escape. Menow reveals an attack is also planned on the fortress city Salmaria. Upon arrival, they find Salmaria has already repelled the demon army and is planning a counter-raid on the Demon King's castle. Fearing the overconfident soldiers will face defeat on open ground, Koji resolves to speak with the Demon King to stop the war. They encounter Rex again and flee just as Berserk Hellbeasts from the Demon King's army appear inside the fortress.
4	"I Have Questions For You"; Transliteration: "Kikitai Koto ga Aru" (Japanese: 聞きたいことがある)	Yoshinobu Kasai	Shinzō Fujita	Minoru Ōhara	July 23, 2026
Rex’s party encounters Koji defeating the Hellbeasts. While Parna remains suspicious, Kannazuki decides to trust him. As a monster horde approaches, Rex evacuates Salmaria, and Koji entrusts Alice to his care before sneaking away to face the horde alone. Takaka explains to Rex Koji wants to protect human-demon coexistence. Confused why Koji is recklessly risking his life, Takaka explains that what Koji lacks, which makes him so strong, is the fear of death. After his father was killed by a monster, Koji rejected the weakness of his "Villager" class and accidentally discovered that when Villagers overcome fear their Level increases far more rapidly than other Classes. By age nine, he reached Level 53 and avenged his father. However, after bandits later killed his mother, Koji grew to resent both humans and demons, but chose neutrality as he knew it would be pointless to blame the entire species for the crimes of only a few individuals. Inspired to truly understand him, the group decides to join Koji on the battlefield, reasoning they cannot question him if he gets himself killed.
5	"Assigned Roles"; Transliteration: "Ataerareta Yakuwari" (Japanese: 与えられた役割)	Naoki Hishikawa	Shinzō Fujita	Nahoko Asahi	July 30, 2026
A flashback reveals nine-year-old Koji once infiltrated the Demon King's castle and spoke to him. Alice arrives with soldier and adventurer reinforcements. Rex marvels at Koji’s stamina, only to learn Koji has been taking tactical five-minute naps in the midst of battle, a testament to his rejection of common sense. Esteller, the Demon King’s corrupt aide, appears with Messiah, a doomsday weapon powered by the drugged Demon King. Esteller reveals Koji’s "Villager" class caps his Level 999 stats to that of a Level 300 Hero, so he cannot defeat Messiah. Undeterred, Koji fights on, revealing his ultimate goal: after hitting Level 999, he gained the skill "One Who Challenges God", meaning a God exists who designed this world and wants Koji to challenge him. To free the people who are trapped by their class titles, Koji intends to surpass Level 999 and defeat God. Koji smashes Messiah and rescues the Demon King, whom Parna believes they should execute while he is weak. Esteller reclaims the Demon King and issues an ultimatum: Koji has one year to buy a mysterious 10,000-gold Guild item that identifies God, or face an even greater assault next time. Everyone is baffled when Koji decides to raise funds by opening a casino.
6	"Her Highness's Thinking"; Transliteration: "Hime-sama no Ōkangae" (Japanese: 姫様のお考え)	Seiya Ishida	Shinzō Fujita	Seiya Ishida	August 6, 2026 (Note: This episode aired at 12:30 a.m. JST, 30 minutes after the regular air time on TV Tokyo.)
Parna abandons the party to report to Hexaldria's King, seeking help to eradicate all demons. Koji struggles to recruit enough casino workers before the grand opening. The King sends David, a slightly perverted royal aide, to check on Kannazuki and bring her home if she is not training properly. Kannazuki insists she is training under the expert Koji. Impressed after observing a dungeon mission, David overhauls the casino's recruitment strategy, successfully drawing huge crowds. Takako develops a crush on David, who is shocked to realize she is actually a woman and that their "male bonding" was flirting. Kannazuki, furious that Koji held back her training to protect her, demands harsher instruction to reach Level 200. Rex defeats an orc sorcerer bare-handed for higher EXP, deepening his respect for Koji’s struggles in training. Curious about Koji’s skills other than Auto-Revive and Limit-Break, the party questions him. Suddenly depressed, Koji reveals five of his skills merely let him flick pebbles with lethal force and accuracy, Exotic-Full-Burst is literally just a cool sounding name with zero benefits, and Reverse reduces the number of spells he can use the higher his level, so as a Level 999 he can no longer cast spells at all.
7	"You're Changed by the People You Meet"; Transliteration: "Deai wa Hito o Kaeru" (Japanese: 出会いは人を変える)	Masaki Arai	Yukinori Fukushima	Masaharu Okuwaki	August 13, 2026
Two days before the casino opens, Takako realizes they lack enough alcohol. David reveals he knows the schedule of a traveling wine merchant, though his convenient knowledge of such makes Koji suspicious. Despite this, opening night is a success, featuring games, a bar, a chapel, and Takako's secret dance club. Meanwhile, David helps Alice hide her horns after seeing them by accident, earning her gratitude. However, Menow spots David meeting a royal agent and suspects betrayal, leading Alice and Koji to monitor David for a week before deciding he is trustworthy when nothing bad happens. In Hexaldria, Parna recalls her schoolmate Adalvel was killed alongside his village after he tried to initiate cultural exchange with a demon village, who feigned peace in order to attack the village. Resentful that Rex's party abandoned their demon-slaying mission, Parna blames Koji for ruining her revenge. After the casino earns just 15 gold in its first week, Koji resolves to hunt the formidable Dark Dragon for extra profit, taking Menow along despite his warnings of the danger. Left behind, Alice heeds David’s advice to make herself more useful to Koji and asks Kannazuki to teach her magic.
8	"Incompatible"; Transliteration: "Aīrenai" (Japanese: 相容れない)	Shoji Kobari	Yukinori Fukushima	Tomoya Takashima & Fukurō Kobari	August 20, 2026
Alice decides to master healing magic and asks David why he kept her horns secret; he explains it was because of her kind heart. Meanwhile, Koji and Menow spend days searching the Dark Dragon’s territory in vain. Suspecting an underground dungeon, Koji digs until the earth begins magically refilling itself, proving there is something underground. Using Limit Break, Koji digs fast enough to break through and find the dungeon. Over six days of defeating low-level monsters, they earn 284 gold. Koji finds the layout strange, a repetitive sequence of straight paths and spiral staircases, and notices they never get hungry or tired. David reveals he must return to the capital soon. Suddenly, Parna arrives and rips off Alice's bandages, exposing her horns to a room of customers. Duke Militaria Remote, the King's aide and Adalvel’s father, arrives with a hundred knights. He arrests David for concealing Alice from the King, orders Kannazuki and Rex returned to the King, and plans to use Alice to track Menow before executing them both. Takako smashes through a wall and escapes with Alice and Tina. Finally, on floor 100, Koji and Menow reach the Dark Dragon, who praises them for making it to his chamber.
9	"Hope Like Never Before"; Transliteration: "Kore Made ni Nai Kibō" (Japanese: これまでにない希望)	Seiya Ishida	Shinzō Fujita	Minoru Ōhara	August 27, 2026
The dragon explains he is a world-maintaining singularity who causes powerful humans to be born. As these humans can only reach him by defeating the Demon King, or buying the guild item, Koji claims he slew the Demon King. As a reward the dragon offers two choices: transcend to the next state of existence, or return home with his memories erased. A total reset would then occur to spawn a new Demon King and rewrite everyone's memories to conceal the truth. Menow is upset to learn the Demon King is merely a tool to facilitate human transcendence. Rejecting both options, Koji battles the dragon to break the system, using Limit Break to temporarily assume the power of a level 999 Hero and spontaneously learn the skill Counterspell Focus. Esteller interrupts, revealing Koji neither killed the Demon King nor bought the item, making him ineligible to transcend. Esteller admits he is another world-maintaining singularity who has served every Demon King after each reset. Since altering the system requires transcendence, Koji decides he will return to the surface with his memories intact, accomplish a specific goal, buy the guild item, and return to transcend in the future. Because Koji's plan requires the Demon King, Esteller returns him, eager to watch what Koji does next.
10	"I'll Destroy It"; Transliteration: "Korekara Kowasu" (Japanese: これから壊す)	Yoshinobu Kasai	Yukiko Sakagami	Minoru Ōhara	September 3, 2026
After rescuing the Demon Lord, Koji explains to him his belief that all people should be able to coexist peacefully, and his fear this will never be possible as long as the world control system exists. Alice, Takako and Tina reunite with them and Alice is overjoyed to see her father. Kagami proposes forcing the Human King into a sit-down negotiation to secure an immediate ceasefire between the two races. However, David appears and warns that peaceful dialogue is impossible as the King harbours an intense hatred toward demons and possesses mind-control abilities, which he used in the past to make Kannazuki hate the Demon King, and which he uses to brainwash all powerful adventurers to hate the Demon King. However, her time with Koji broke the mind control on Kannazuki, and David decided to become loyal to Koji in his gratitude for helping Kannazuki. Fearing Kannazuki will have her free will taken from her again, Koji launches a direct assault through the main castle gates to save her and Rex. Meanwhile, the Demon King unleashes his dormant power to aid the effort. As Koji destroys the castle defenses, the party begins to realize the King's extreme actions may be driven by the underlying rules of the world's system itself.
11	"The King's Authority is Absolute"; Transliteration: "Ō wa Zettai" (Japanese: 王は絶対)	Shoji Kobari	Yukinori Fukushima	Masaharu Okuwaki	September 10, 2026
David warns Koji to beware Duke Militaria, whose skill reduces all non-mana stats. Koji and David find Parna with the King, who admits to mildly hypnotizing Rex while fully brainwashing Kannazuki. Amused by Koji’s explanation of world resets, the King reveals he is the human singularity while Esteller and the Dark Dragon are the demon and monster singularities. Parna is initially horrified but stays loyal to the King, who kidnaps the Demon King, spares Koji and Tina for future brainwashing, and tries to kill Alice. Koji jumps in front of Alice and is killed. Bored, the King lets Parna burn Alice, who stubbornly refuses to move because she is using her remaining strength to successfully revive Koji. The King and Militaria then reveal they framed Militaria’s peace-seeking son, Adalvel, for murdering a demon, causing the demons he tried to befriend to slaughter Adalvel and his peaceful followers. Disgusted that Militaria orchestrated his own son's murder, Parna attacks him, but Koji stops Parna, declaring Militaria isn't worth it. Remorseful, Parna heals Alice instead. Outraged by Militaria’s cruelty, obsession with the King, and ruinous actions, Koji overcomes Militaria’s stat-draining ability and surpasses his limits once more.
12	"Damned Ideas of Common Sense"; Transliteration: "Kuso Mitai na Jōshiki" (Japanese: クソみたいな常識)	Yoshinobu Kasai	Shinzō Fujita	Tomoya Takashima, Fukurō Kobari & Yoshinobu Kasai	September 17, 2026
With Militaria unconscious, Koji confronts the King, who believes he is an unbeatable singularity destined to protect the world system until a true champion emerges. Koji counters that the system keeps everyone, even the King, trapped in a cycle of generating failed champions and resets. He offers to save the King by becoming the final champion, destroying the system from the outside instead of breaking rules from within. Koji breaches the throne room's impenetrable barrier and borrows Menow's mana to destroy Kannazuki’s tower, catching her as she falls. Breaking the brainwashing restores Kannazuki and Rex to normal. After Esteller convinces the King to trust Koji, the King grants him six months to earn the 10,000 gold, buy the guild item, and transcend, followed by five years to save the world before he activates the total system reset. Six months later, tentative peace blooms as humans and demons hunt monsters together. Parna, Kannazuki, and Rex work at Koji's casino to draw high-paying clientele. After earning the money, Koji buys the item, a paper ticket, bids farewell, tears the ticket and vanishes. Three years pass; humans and demons coexist, and while Koji’s friends move on with their lives across distant lands, Alice grows up and continues to wait for him.

== Reception ==
The manga adaptation won the grand prize at the Minna ga Erabu!! Denshi Comic Taishō 2019 competition hosted by NTT Solmare. The manga adaptation also won the Terra Award at the 2020 Piccoma Awards.

== See also ==
- Management of a Novice Alchemist, another light novel series with the same illustrator
