= Comp Ace =

Japanese game and manga magazine

- Cover of the September 2024 issue featuring The Saga of Tanya the Evil
- Categories: Seinen manga, Visual novels, Computer games
- Frequency: Monthly
- Publisher: Kadokawa Shoten
- First issue: March 26, 2005
- Country: Japan
- Based in: Tokyo
- Language: Japanese
- Website: web-ace.jp/compace/

Comp Ace (コンプ エース, Konpu Eesu; short for Comptiq Ace) is a Japanese computer game and manga magazine published by Kadokawa Shoten. Comp Ace began as a special edition version of another one of Kadokawa Shoten's magazines, Comptiq. The first issue was released on March 26, 2005, and was published quarterly for the first three volumes which had cover illustrations by Itaru Hinoue of Key. Volumes four through nine were published bimonthly with cover art provided by Aoi Nishimata of Navel. Volume ten was published three months after volume nine, and from ten on the magazine was published monthly, now with new cover art by Naru Nanao, Hiro Suzuhira, and illustrators from Type-Moon and August. Starting with the August 2007 issue published on June 26, 2007, Comp Ace broke off from Comptiq and became its own magazine. Its main focus is on bishōjo games and manga that are based on said games.

== Serialized manga ==
- 11eyes: Tsumi to Batsu to Aganai no Shōjo
- _Summer
- Aiyoku no Eustia
- Akaneiro ni Somaru Saka
- Akira's Ambition
- Alice Quartet Obbligato
- Angel Magister
- Ao no Kanata no Four Rhythm
- AR Forgotten summer
- Arcana Heart
- Baldr Sky
- Basquash! Eclipse Stage
- Battle Cinder-Ella-
- Canaan
- Canvas 2 ~Niji Iro no Sketch~
- Cardfight!! Vanguard
- Clear
- Code Geass - Knightmare of Nunnally
- Cross Days
- Da Capo III
- Dahlia in Bloom
- The Do-Over Damsel Conquers the Dragon Emperor
- Eve: New Generation
- FairlyLife
- Fantasista Doll
- Fate/Extra CCC Foxtail
- Fate/kaleid liner Prisma Illya
- Fate/kaleid liner Prisma Illya 2wei!
- Fate/kaleid liner Prisma Illya 3rei!!
- Festa!! -Hyper Girls Pop-
- Fukanzen Shinsei Kikan Iris
- H_{2}O: Footprints in the Sand
- Hatsune Miku: Mikubon
- Hatsuyuki Sakura
- Hana no Miyako!
- Hibiki's Magic
- Higurashi no Naku Koro ni - Onisarashi-hen and Utsutsukowashi-hen arcs
- Hoshiuta
- HR
- Hybrid x Heart Magias Academy Ataraxia
- Idolmaster: Xenoglossia
- I'm the Villainess, So I'm Taming the Final Boss
- In Search of the Lost Future
- Kantai Collection: Seamine Squadron Chronicles
- Kono Aozora ni Yakusoku o: Melody of the Sun and Sea
- Kiddy Girl-and Pure
- Kimi ga Aruji de Shitsuji ga Ore de
- The Level 999 Villager
- Little Busters!
- Lucky Star
- Macross Frontier
- Magical Girl Lyrical Nanoha ViVid
- Magical Girl Lyrical Nanoha Innocent
- Mahō Shōjo Ikusei Keikaku
- Maji de Watashi ni Koishinasai!
- Maoyū Maō Yūsha - "Kono Watashi no Mono Tonare, Yuusha Yo" "Kotowaru!"
- Mashiroiro Symphony
- Melty Blood
- Miniten: Happy Project
- Munto
- Musō Tōrō
- Ninja Slayer: Machine of Vengeance
- Oretachi ni Tsubasa wa Nai: Rhapsody
- Over Lord
- Rental Magica from Solomon
- The Saga of Tanya the Evil
- Sakura no Uta
- School Days
- Stellar Theater
- Strike Witches
- Strange and Bright Nature Deity
- SweetHoneyComing
- Tantei Opera Milky Holmes
- Tayutama: Kiss on my Deity
- Tengen Toppa Gurren Lagann: Gurren Gakuen-hen
- Tick! Tack!: Never Say Goodbye
- Touhou Suzunaan: Forbidden Scrollery
- Tsuyokiss
- Utsūtsuhi de Onikki
- Valkyria Chronicles
- Weiß Survive R
- The Wrong Way to Use Healing Magic
- Yosuga no Sora
- Yōjo Senki
