= Fukui Television Broadcasting =

Fukui Television Broadcasting Co., Ltd.

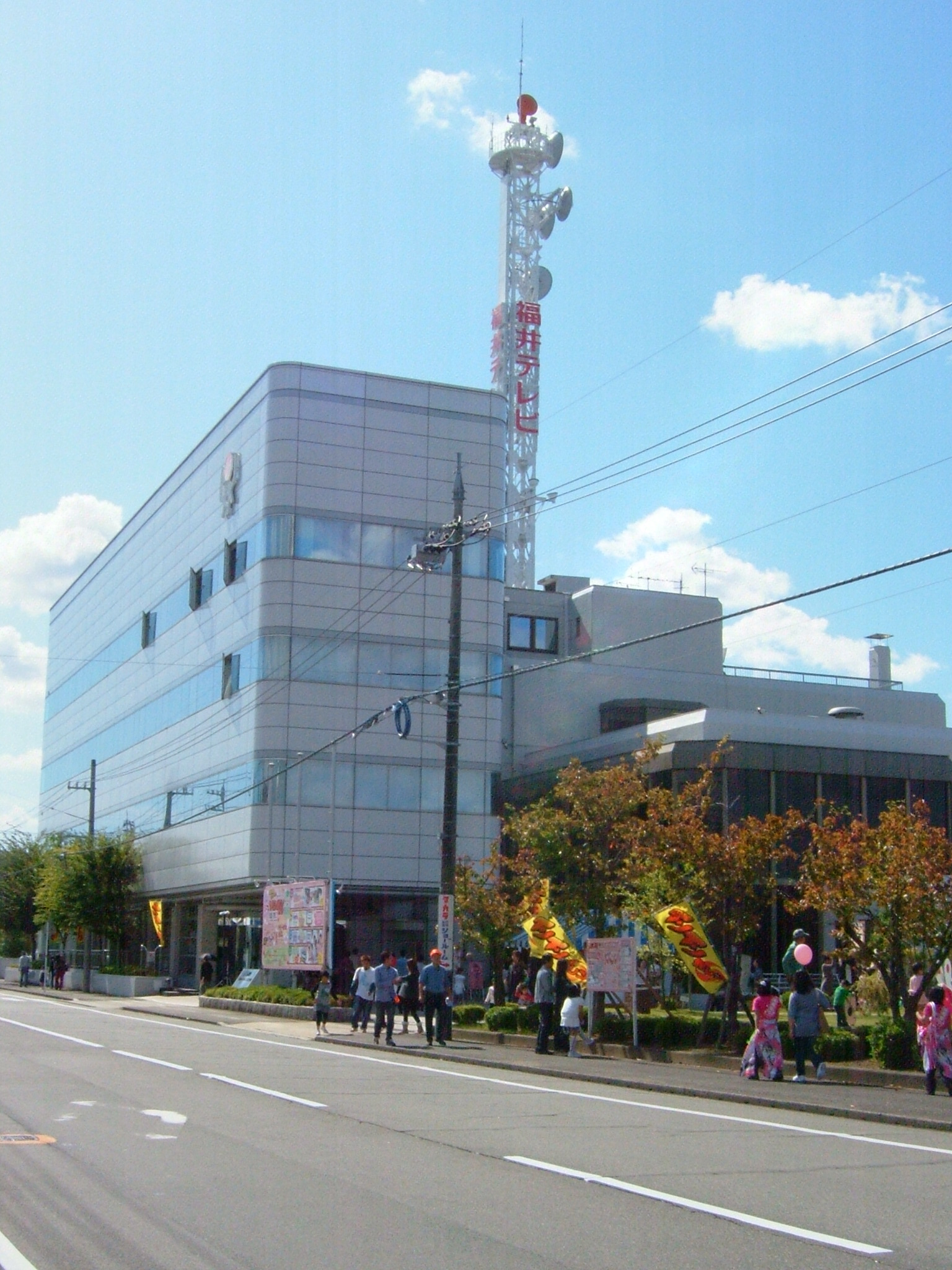
- Trade name: Fukui TV
- Native name: 福井テレビジョン放送株式会社
- Romanized name: Fukuiterebijonhōsō kabushikigaisha
- Company type: Kabushiki gaisha
- Industry: Television broadcasting
- Founded: January 29, 1969; 57 years ago
- Headquarters: 3-410 Toiyacho, Fukui City, Fukui Prefecture, Japan
- Website: www.fukui-tv.co.jp
- Footnotes / references Data from its Company Profile

JOFI-DTV
- Fukui Prefecture; Japan
- City: Fukui
- Channels: Digital: 22 (UHF); Virtual: 8
- Branding: Fukui TV; FTB

Programming
- Affiliations: Fuji News Network and Fuji Network System

Ownership
- Owner: Fukui Television Broadcasting Co., Ltd.

History
- First air date: October 1, 1969
- Former call signs: JOFI-TV (1969–2011)
- Former channel numbers: 39 (analog UHF, 1969–2011)
- Call sign meaning: FukuI (name of prefecture)

Technical information
- Licensing authority: MIC

Fukui Television Broadcasting Co., Ltd. (福井テレビジョン放送株式会社, Fukui Terebijon Hōsō Kabushikigaisha; FTB), currently known as Fukui TV (福井テレビ, Fukui Terebi), is a Japanese terrestrial commercial television broadcasting company headquartered in Fukui, Japan. The company was established on October 1, 1969. Fukui TV is a member of Fuji News Network - Fuji Network System keyed by Fuji Television.
