= Root After and Another =

2007 video game

- Developer(s): Makura
- Publisher(s): Makura
- Platform(s): Windows
- Release: JP: October 26, 2007
- Genre(s): Eroge, Visual novel
- Mode(s): Single player

Root After and Another (styled as √after and another) is a Japanese adult visual novel by Makura which was released on October 26, 2007 for Windows as a DVD in limited and regular first editions. Root After and Another is Makura's second game and is the sequel to their first game H_{2}O: Footprints in the Sand. The gameplay in Root After and Another follows a plot line which offers pre-determined scenarios with courses of interaction, and focuses on the appeal of the six female main characters with playable routes. The game's scenario was ranked 17th and the music was ranked 25th in Getchu.com's 2007 ranking.

== Gameplay ==
The gameplay requires almost no interaction from the player as nearly the entire duration of the game is spent on simply reading the text that will appear on the screen; this text represents either dialogue between the various characters, or the inner thoughts of the protagonist. There is a single choice that the player gets to make which determines which girl the protagonist chooses. There are six main plot lines that the player will have the chance to experience, one for each of the heroines in the story. In order to view the six plot lines to their entirety, the player will have to replay the game multiple times and choose a different choice at the single decision point in order to further the plot in an alternate direction. In contrast to visual novel adventure games where the text appears near the bottom of the screen leaving the rest of the window open for viewing the game's visual content, the text in Root After and Another appears over the entire screen in a shaded, but otherwise transparent box. However, there is an option to hide the text in order to see the background without obstruction.

== Plot ==
Root After and Another takes place after H_{2}O: Footprints in the Sand; Setsuna Inagaki is a new character.

== Characters ==
Takuma Hirose (弘瀬 琢磨, Hirose Takuma)
Hayami Kohinata (小日向 はやみ, Kohinata Hayami)
Setsuna Inagaki (稲垣 雪那, Inagaki Setsuna)
Yukiji Yakumo (八雲 雪路, Yakumo Yukiji)
Hamaji Yakumo (八雲 はまじ, Yakumo Hamaji)
Yui Tabata (田端 ゆい, Tabata Yui)
Hotaru Kagura (神楽 ほたる, Kagura Hotaru)
Otoha (音羽) / Hinata Kagura (神楽 ひなた, Kagura Hinata)
Maki Kumon (久門真紀, Kumon Maki)
