= HoneyComing =

2007 video game

- HoneyComing original visual novel cover

ハニーカミング (HanīKamingu)
- Genre: Drama, Harem
- Manga

HoneyComing: Sweet Love Lesson
- Written by: Hooksoft
- Illustrated by: Ui Takano
- Published by: Kadokawa Shoten
- Imprint: Kadokawa Comics Ace
- Magazine: Comptiq
- Original run: February 2007 – October 2008
- Volumes: 3
- Manga

HoneComi The 4-koma
- Written by: Hooksoft
- Illustrated by: Yuki Kiriga
- Published by: ASCII Media Works
- Imprint: Dengeki Comics EX
- Magazine: Dengeki G's Magazine; Dengeki G's Festival! Comic
- Original run: February 28, 2007 – April 25, 2009
- Volumes: 1
- Video game
- Developer: Hooksoft
- Publisher: Hooksoft (Windows); Kadokawa Shoten (PS2)
- Genre: Eroge, Visual novel
- Platform: Windows, PlayStation 2
- Released: JP: June 29, 2007 (Windows limited ed.); JP: August 24, 2007 (Windows regular ed.); JP: September 3, 2009 (PS2)
- Light novel
- Written by: Jōji Kamio
- Illustrated by: Makako Matsumoto; Rakko
- Published by: GoodsTrain
- Imprint: TwinTail Novels
- Original run: October 25, 2007 – July 2008
- Volumes: 3
- Light novel
- Written by: Hack; Masamune Yotsuya
- Illustrated by: Makako Matsumoto; Rakko
- Published by: Harvest
- Imprint: Harvest Novels
- Original run: December 1, 2007 – March 2008
- Volumes: 3
- Manga

SweetHoneyComing
- Written by: Hooksoft
- Illustrated by: Akuru Uira
- Published by: Kadokawa Shoten
- Imprint: Kadokawa Comics Ace
- Magazine: Comp Ace
- Original run: March 2009 – July 2009
- Volumes: 1
- Video game

@HoneyComing RoyalSweet
- Developer: Hooksoft
- Publisher: Hooksoft
- Genre: Eroge, Visual novel
- Platform: Windows
- Released: JP: August 28, 2009 (Windows)
- Light novel

@HoneyComing RoyalSweet
- Written by: Renri Akatsuki
- Illustrated by: Makako Matsumoto
- Published by: Eagle Publishing
- Imprint: Pumpkin Novels
- Published: January 15, 2010
- Volumes: 1

HoneyComing (ハニーカミング, HanīKamingu) is an adult Japanese visual novel developed by Hooksoft which was released on June 29, 2007, for Windows. Kadokawa Shoten published a PlayStation 2 port of the game on September 3, 2009. HoneyComing is Hooksoft's sixth title, along with other games such as Orange Pocket, and _Summer. A fan disc called @HoneyComing RoyalSweet was released on August 28, 2009. The gameplay in HoneyComing follows a plot line which offers pre-determined scenarios with courses of interaction, and focuses on the appeal of the five female main characters. The game offers three different modes: Amusement, Feeling, and Only One. The story revolves around Kōichirō Ogata, a young man entering his first year of high school into a former all-girls school. However, at this school, there are still mandatory subjects taught on love and romance, much to the dislike of Kōichirō.

There have been three manga adaptations based on HoneyComing published by ASCII Media Works and Kadokawa Shoten. Five character song CDs were released between December 2006 and April 2007. Many drama CDs have also been produced. Two light novel series were published by GoodsTrain and Harvest, and another light novel adaptation consisting of one volume was published by Eagle Publishing.

== Gameplay ==
Example of what average conversation looks like in HoneyComing. Here, Kōichirō is talking with Asahi.

The gameplay requires little interaction from the player as most of the duration of the game is spent on simply reading the text that will appear on the screen; this text represents either dialogue between the various characters, or the inner thoughts of the protagonist. Every so often, the player will come to a "decision point" where he or she is given the chance to choose from options that are displayed on the screen, typically two to three at a time. During these times, gameplay pauses until a choice is made that furthers the plot in a specific direction, depending on which choice the player makes. There are five main plot lines that the player will have the chance to experience, one for each of the heroines in the story. In order to view the five plot lines to their entirety, the player will have to replay the game multiple times and choose different choices during the decision points in order to further the plot in an alternate direction.

The game begins with a choice of three modes: Amusement, Feeling, and Only One. Amusement Mode is intended for beginners where each of the heroines will have a favorable impression, and an icon on the screen shows the player how far in the game they have progressed. The Feeling Mode does not have an icon to show how far the player has progressed, and is seen as the typical setting for an adult visual novel. The last mode, Only One, starts with a selection for the player to choose one of the five heroines. Whichever girl the player chooses will determine which route the player will experience.

== Plot ==
=== Story ===
HoneyComing's story revolves around the protagonist Kōichirō Ogata, a male first-year high school student who does not have any interest in matters such as love or romance. The high school he is admitted to, named Aikyō Academy (愛嬌学園, Aikyō Gakuen), used to be an all-girl school formally named Aikyō Girl's Academy (愛嬌女学園, Aikyō Jogakuen), and still carries a high population of female students. He starts school with his childhood friend Asahi Kamijō, his younger stepsister Mio Ogata, and best male friend Masanori Shinozaki. Kōichirō eventually meets two more female upperclassmen from the same school named Clarissa Satsuki Maezono, and Yuma Shichiri, along with a female underclassman from an affiliated school named Marino Tagaya; Kōichirō becomes friends with them. Since the school used to only have female students, there are certain classes oriented towards girls which are still required to take, such as lessons on love and romance.

These lessons are known as Love-making Lessons (恋愛授業, Renai Jugyō), and students at Aikyō are required to take these classes on how to fall in love, and the ways of proper romance techniques. Each lesson, two people (of the opposite sex) pair up to make something, such as a meal for example, and they must form good communication if they intend to pass the test. There are also tests on practical skills which required note taking to later be studied for tests. During these lessons, students from Aikyō, and a nearby affiliated junior-high school, are combined for a total range of six grades from the lowest to the highest. Each time, forty new students from either school are chosen to take part in a special class for the Love-making Lessons. The students in the special class this year include: Kōichirō, Asahi, Clarissa, Mio, Yuma, Marino, Kaoru, Masanori, and Hiroko. Two teachers are assigned to this class: Ichigo Raidō (who is in charge of the boys), and Tsukasa Kurebayashi (who is in charge of the girls).

The girls of HoneyComing (from left to right): Yuma, Clarissa, Asahi, Marino, and Mio.

=== Characters ===
==== Main characters ====
Kōichirō Ogata (緒方 光一郎, Ogata Kōichirō)
Kōichirō is a first-year high school student and is the protagonist of the story. He lives in a four-person household with his father Hajime, his stepmother Minatsu, and his younger stepsister Mio; Mio is Minatsu's daughter, and is not related by blood with Kōichirō. Due to the relationship between his father and birth-mother, Kōichirō dislikes matters such as love or romance. Kōichirō's father wants to change this side of his son, so he enrolls him into Aikyō Academy because they teach lessons on love and romance. He dislikes sweet food.

Asahi Kamijō (上条 朝陽, Kamijō Asahi)
Voiced by: Kyōko Hirano (PC), Kyōko Fujimoto (PS2)
Asahi is Kōichirō's childhood friend, and is the same age as him; since they have known each other for a long time, she likes to address him as "Kō" (コウ). She has a strong personality, however she is sometimes shown to be shy. Unlike Kōichirō, she is very interested in love and romance, and gets excited about the lessons at Aikyō about them. Again in contrast to Kōichirō, she loves sweet food, especially chocolate, so much so that Kōichirō sometimes refers to Asahi as a "chocolate junkie".

Clarissa Satsuki Maezono (前園・クラリッサ・皐, Maezono Kurarissa Satsuki)
Voiced by: Ichigo Momoi (PC), Aiko Okubo (PS2)
Clarissa, or simply "Clair" (クレア, Kurea), is a second-year student at Aikyō. Her father is Italian and her mother is Japanese, making her half Italian, and half Japanese. A year before the story began, Clarissa's grandmother on her mother's side was sick and Clarissa and her family moved back to Japan from Italy. She has a gentle personality accentuating through her kind heart and speech patterns. Due to this, she is seen as an idol at school and around her neighborhood. She is in the Gardening Club, and will often help out at the local senior citizen's home as a volunteer.

Mio Ogata (緒方 未央, Ogata Mio)
Voiced by: Mio Ōkawa (PC), Maki Kobayashi (PS2)
Mio is Kōichirō younger stepsister, not related by blood, but since their age difference is not by much, she is also a first-year student at Aikyō, and is in Kōichirō's class. She has a small build, is short, and has a quiet personality. She is a delicate person, and is known to be a crybaby. She loves her brother very much, and will often go to great lengths to please him. She is in the Drama Club at school.

Yuma Shichiri (七里 由馬, Shichiri Yuma)
Voiced by: Riko Koide (PC), Tomo Adachi (PS2)
Yuma is a third-year student at Aikyō. Despite Aikyō transitioning to a school with both male and female students, Yuma still embraces the school as an all-girls school, and is seen as an upper-class type of girl. However, she loves the lesser expensive food of the working class, and is known to be quite a glutton in this respect. She is always reserved, and expressionless, though when she wants to talk, she will often speak with a wicked tongue. Yuma is in the Naginatajutsu Club, and is very skilled at the sport.

Marino Tagaya (多賀谷 麻里乃, Tagaya Marino)
Voiced by: Yō Ochi (PC), Rika Ogaki (PS2)
Marino is a third-year student at an affiliated junior-high school of Aikyō's. She was once the daughter of a rich man, but her father's business eventually went bankrupt. Due to this, she has taken a part-time job so she does not have to willingly live in poverty. She still has pride for her upbringing, and will add "-desu wa" (～ですわ) at the end of some of her sentences. Her school's students are combined into Aikyō's love and romance lessons, of which she is an unwilling participant; this is because she has androphobia, a fear of men.

==== Supporting characters ====
Hajime Ogata (緒方 肇, Ogata Hajime)
Voiced by: Keigo Honda (PC), Shinya Takahashi (PS2)
Hajime is Kōichirō's father. He is the manager of a small company, and returns home early most of the time. Unlike his son, Hajime can go on and on about how wonderful love and romance is, and he wants his son to be the same way; Kōichirō just treats him like an annoyance when he is like this, which is almost all the time. If he is in a quarrel, or gets excited, he yells very loudly, which is something the neighborhood has grown accustomed to.

Minatsu Ogata (緒方 美夏, Ogata Minatsu)
Voiced by: Shino Kujō (PC), Yūko Gotō (PS2)
Minatsu is Mio's mother, and Kōichirō's stepmother after his father remarried. She often gets mistaken for Mio's older sister due to her young appearance. Kōichirō and Mio were still very young when the Minatsu married Hajime.

Masanori Shinozaki (篠崎 政則, Shinozaki Masanori)
Voiced by: Kai Mondo (PC), Shintarō Ōhata (PS2)
Masanori is Kōichirō's best male friend, and is a fellow first-year student at Aikyō. He is a skinhead and has a strong build. Due to this, he appears as though he would fit in with the Japanese yakuza, but he is just impulsive by nature. He has a younger sister named Koyori that he dots on constantly due to his sister complex and lolicon behavior.

Koyori Shinozaki (篠崎 こより, Shinozaki Koyori)
Voiced by: Aoi Kamizugi (PC), Megu Ashiro (PS2)
Koyori is Masanori's younger sister. She does not like her brother at all and thinks of him as if he were trash.

Kaoru Nakanishi (中西 薫, Nakanishi Kaoru)
Voiced by: Yukari Aoyama (PC), Akane Tomonaga (PS2)
Kaoru, like Masanori, is a good friend of Kōichirō. He has a small build and has a reserved personality, and many of the girls at school think he is cute.

Ichigo Raidō (雷堂 苺, Raidō Ichigo)
Voiced by: Izumi Maki (PC), Natsumi Yanase (PS2)
Ichigo is Kōichirō's homeroom teacher and is in charge of the lessons on love and romance for Kōichirō's class; she heads the boys in such lessons. When she gets angry, her speech becomes rude, and with wield a naginata; she is a very enthusiastic teacher. Since Yume is in the Naginatajutsu Club, Ichigo often advises her on the sport.

Tsukasa Kurebayashi (紅林 司, Kurebayashi Tsukasa)
Voiced by: Rino Kawashima (PC), Kei Mizusawa (PS2)
Tsukasa is another teacher at Aikyō Academy, and is also in charge of the lessons on love and romance for Kōichirō's class; he heads the girls in such lessons. He appears to be female, but almost all the students know he is male. He is always seen wearing traditional female Japanese-style clothing. He differs from Ichigo in that Tsukasa has a calm personality. Tsukasa often gives advice to Mio in the Drama Club.

Hiroko Yano (矢野 弘子, Yano Hiroko)
Voiced by: Sakura Fubuki (PC), Hitomi Nabatame (PS2)
Hiroko is Marino's roommate in the women's dormitory, and is her close friend. She wears glasses, and is a plain member of the working class. Hiroko and Marino often call each other "Maririn" (まりりん), and "Piroko" (ぴろ子) as terms of endearment.

Ryōko Sumeragi (皇城 椋子, Sumeragi Ryōko)
Voiced by: Yukari Aoyama (PC), Akane Tomonaga (PS2)
Ryōko is a girl in the same class as Clarissa. She has a bright, vigorous personality. Without knowing exactly why, Ryōko finds herself thinking about Clarissa often.

Mana Tagaya (多賀谷 真奈, Tagaya Mana)
Voiced by: Rino Kawashima (PC), Kei Mizusawa (PS2)
Mana is Marino's younger sister, and is the youngest of her three siblings. She has a similar competitive spirit as with her older sister, and is also very strong-willed.

Mamoru Tagaya (多賀谷 護, Tagaya Mamoru)
Voiced by: Izumi Maki (PC), Natsumi Yanase (PS2)
Mamoru is Marino's younger brother. He still has a childish attitude and is mischievous. However, he takes great care with Mana.

Mitsutaka Saionji (西園寺 三孝, Saionji Mitsutaka)
Voiced by: Keigo Honda (PC), Shinya Takahashi (PS2)
Mitsutaka is a son of the distinguished Saionji family. He has a haughty attitude typical of such an upbringing.

Manato Shimoyanagi (下柳 港, Shimoyanagi Manato)
Voiced by: Hitomi
Manato is a female maid in the Saionji household. She is in charge of looking after the Saionji family, but flat-out dislikes her line of work.

== Development and release history ==
The producer for HoneyComing was Akira Asami, while supervision of the project was headed by Mujin Kawanami, who was also the main scenario writer. The art director for the game was Shitano, but the character artwork was headed by Makako Matsushita, and Racco. General computer graphics was headed by Rohei Yamane, who was accompanied by Mitsuki, and Mahiro. The music in the game was composed by Takao Matsūra, while sound in general was done by VII.

On May 16, 2007, a free game demo of HoneyComing, "Ver. 1.00", for Clarissa's scenario became available for download at HoneyComing's official website via a direct download link or BitTorrent. More free game demos followed, one for each heroine, and then yet another free game demo, "Ver. 1.02", for all five heroines later became available for download in early July 2007. An update for Ver. 1.02 was released on September 13, 2007. The full game was first introduced in Japan as a limited edition version on June 29, 2007 as a DVD playable on a Microsoft Windows PC. The regular edition was released on August 24, 2007. A fan disc of HoneyComing, called @HoneyComing RoyalSweet, was released in both premium and basic editions for the PC on August 28, 2009. @HoneyComing RoyalSweet features short stories for the five heroines of HoneyComing and contains additional scenarios for four sub-heroines. A version of HoneyComing without adult content playable on the PlayStation 2 was published by Kadokawa Shoten and released on September 3, 2009 titled SweetHoneyComing.

== Related media ==
HoneyComing: Sweet Love Lesson manga volume 1.

=== Manga ===
A manga adaptation, under the title HoneyComing: Sweet Love Lesson (HoneyComing ～すうぃーとLOVEレッスン～, HoneyComing ~Swīto LOVE Ressun~), was serialized in Kadokawa Shoten's Comptiq magazine under their Kadokawa Comics Ace imprint between the February 2007 and October 2008 issues, illustrated by Ui Takano. Three bound volumes were released for the series between August 10, 2007, and October 10, 2008. A second manga, this time a four-panel comic strip, under the title HoneComi The 4-koma (ハニカミ The4コマ, HaniKami The 4-koma), was serialized in ASCII Media Works' Dengeki G's Magazine under their Dengeki Comics EX imprint between February 28, 2007, and January 30, 2008, illustrated by Yuki Kiriga. The manga was subsequently transferred to Dengeki G's Festival! Comic, a special edition version of Dengeki G's Magazine, on April 26, 2008, and ran in that magazine until the publication of its sixth volume on April 25, 2009. The four-panel comic strip had also appeared in Dengeki G's Festival! Comic with the first issue sold on November 26, 2007. A single bound volume for HoneComi The 4-koma was released on July 27, 2009, by ASCII Media Works. A short-lived third manga entitled SweetHoneyComing (スイートハニーカミング, SuītoHanīKamingu) illustrated by Akuru Uira was serialized in Kadokawa Shoten's Comp Ace magazine under their Kadokawa Comics Ace imprint between the March and July 2009 issues.

=== Light novels and books ===
There are two erotic light novel series based on HoneyComing. The first series is written by Jōji Kamio, with illustrations by Makako Matsumoto and Rakko, and is published by GoodsTrain under their TwinTail Novels label. The first novel was released on October 25, 2007, featuring Asahi on the cover, and the second novel was released in February 2008 featuring Clarissa on the cover. The third and final novel was released on July 25, 2008, featuring Marino on the cover. The second light novel series is written by Hack and Masamune Yotsuya with the same illustrators, and is published by Harvest, under their Harvest Novels label. Three novels were published in the second series released between December 1, 2007, and March 2008. Lastly, an adult light novel based on the game's fan disc @HoneyComing RoyalSweet, was published by Eagle Publishing on January 15, 2010, under their Pumpkin Novels label. It was written by Renri Akatsuki, and illustrated by Makako Matsumoto.

A 60-page visual fan book for HoneyComing, entitled HoneyComing Official Perfect Visual Book, was published by ASCII Media Works on December 7, 2007. The book includes a promotional illustration gallery, a character and story introduction, interviews with staff and voice actors, and more. Another visual fan book, for @HoneyComing RoyalSweet, entitled @HoneyComing RoyalSweet Official Fan Book, was published by Eagle Publishing on January 15, 2010, consisting of 111 pages.

=== Music and audio drama ===
HoneyComing's opening theme is "Love Hell Rocket" by Haruko Aoki. The short version of the opening theme is available for download at HoneyComing's official website; an "eight-bit-shooting" arrange version of the song is also available for download. The game's ending theme is "Kaerimachi" (帰り道, Return Trip) by Miki Tsuchiya. A music album entitled HoneyComing Variety Sound Collection "IF" was sold with the limited edition version of the game; the album contained the opening and ending themes along with background music featured in game. Five character song CDs under the main title of HoneyComing First Impression were released; each CD covers one of the heroines from the game. The first, Asahiism, was released on December 29, 2006; the second, Clairism, followed on January 26, 2007; the third, Mioism, went on sale on February 23, 2007. The last two, Yumaism, and Marinoism, were released on March 23, 2007, and April 27, 2007, respectively. The game's original soundtrack was released on January 9, 2008. A drama CD entitled HoneyComing: one more chime! was released by Marine Entertainment on December 29, 2007. The voices were the same as provided for the visual novel.

Three different drama CDs were released on May 25, 2007, all of which containing two drama tracks and an insert song for one of the heroines. One of these drama CDs was HoneyComing Getchuya Original Drama CD, which was released by Getchuya. The second drama CD, titled HoneyComing LAOX Original Drama CD, was released by LAOX; and a third, titled HoneyComing Messe Sanoh Original Drama CD, was released by Messe Sanoh. Lastly, Sofmap released a drama CD titled HoneyComing Sofmap Original Drama CD, which consists of two discs, each disc containing two audio drama tracks and an insert song.

== Reception ==
In the October 2007 issue of Dengeki G's Magazine, poll results for the fifty best bishōjo games were released. Out of 249 titles, HoneyComing ranked nineteenth with fourteen votes, and was tied with ToHeart.

Two character popularity polls were held on the official website. The first character poll started on June 8, 2007, and results were announced on June 22, 2007. A total of 28,960 votes were counted. Clarissa came first; Asahi came second; Marino came third; Mio came fourth, and Yuma came fifth. Four other characters were included in the poll. As a prize for gathering the most votes, Clarissa received both a wallpaper and screensaver. A second character poll ran on the official website from June 29, 2007, from July 31, 2007, notably longer than the first one. A total of 18,211 votes were made, and Clarissa resulted in gathering the most votes again, respectively.

HoneyComing was the highest selling game for the month of June 2007 on Getchu.com, and dropped to eleventh in the ranking the following month. HoneyComing was the third most widely sold game for the first half of 2007 on Getchu.com, just behind D.C.II Spring Celebration in second and Kimi ga Aruji de Shitsuji ga Ore de in first. Furthermore, HoneyComing was the fourth most widely sold game of 2007 on Getchu.com.
