= FairlyLife =

Japanese visual novel

- FairlyLife's original visual novel cover.

フェアリーライフ (FearīRaifu)
- Genre: Drama, Harem, Romance
- Manga
- Written by: Hooksoft
- Illustrated by: Kurumi Morisaki
- Published by: Kadokawa Shoten
- Magazine: Comp Ace
- Original run: September 26, 2008 – November 26, 2008
- Video game
- Developer: Hooksoft (Windows)
- Publisher: Hooksoft (Windows); GN Software, Piacci (PSP)
- Genre: Eroge, Visual novel
- Platform: Windows, PlayStation Portable
- Released: October 10, 2008 (Windows)
- Video game

Mikuri Makuri
- Developer: Hooksoft
- Publisher: Hooksoft
- Genre: Eroge, Visual novel
- Platform: Windows
- Released: December 28, 2008

FairlyLife (フェアリーライフ, FearīRaifu) is a Japanese adult visual novel developed by Hooksoft and was first released for Windows as a DVD on October 10, 2008, as a limited edition. FairlyLife is Hooksoft's seventh title, along with other games such as _Summer and HoneyComing. The game is described by the development team as "infinite gravity! A full power noisy miracle romantic comedy ADV" (重力無限大!全力どたばたミラクルラブコメADV, jūryoku mugendai! Zenryoku dotabata mirakuru rabucome ADV). The gameplay in FairlyLife follows a plot line which offers pre-determined scenarios with courses of interaction, and focuses on the appeal of the five female main characters. The title and logo of FairlyLife is reminiscent of Hooksoft's fourth title Like Life, and both games feature moe anthropomorphism. A manga adaptation illustrated by Kurumi Morisaki was serialized in Kadokawa Shoten's manga magazine Comp Ace between September 26 and November 26, 2008.

== Gameplay ==
FairlyLife's gameplay requires little interaction from the player as most of the duration of the game is spent simply reading the text that appears on the screen which represents either dialogue between the various characters or the inner thoughts of the protagonist. Every so often, the player will come to a point where he or she is given the chance to choose from multiple options. The time between these points is variable and can occur anywhere from a minute to much longer. Gameplay pauses at these points and depending on which choice the player makes, the plot will progress in a specific direction. There are five main plot lines that the player will have the chance to experience, one for each of the heroines in the story. To view all five plot lines, the player will have to replay the game multiple times and make different decisions to progress the plot in an alternate direction. One of the goals of the gameplay is for the player to enable the viewing of hentai scenes depicting the protagonist, Akinori Takaoka, and one of the five heroines having sexual intercourse.

== Development ==
FairlyLife is Hooksoft's seventh title. The game was directed by Mujin Kawanami, and produced by Akira Asami. The general manager was Kei, and the event planner was Uto Yakamoto. The game was programmed by Ichirōji, and was edited by Noah Kuroki. The scenario staff for FairlyLife consists of Kawanami as the main writer, and Mohrii as the only other writer. Art direction was headed by Shitano, while graphics was headed by Rohei Yamane and other graphics were done by Mitsuki and Mahiro. Character design was shared by the two artists Makako Matsushita and Racco. The music in the game was composed by Takao Matsuura, while sound in general was headed by VII.

=== Release history ===
Two free game demos are available for download at FairlyLife's official website; the first contains no adult material, while the second does. FairlyLife was first be released on October 10, 2008 as a limited edition DVD playable only on a Microsoft Windows PC, and came bundled with a music CD containing an insert song featured in the visual novel and a set of piano arrange tracks of the heroines' leitmotifs. A fan disc featuring a focus on the heroine Miku Takaoka entitled Mikuri Makuri was released at Comiket 75 on December 28, 2008. A PlayStation Portable port titled FairlyLife: MiracleDays was released by GN Software on February 25, 2010.

== Related media ==
=== Manga ===
A manga adaptation illustrated by Kurumi Morisaki was serialized in Kadokawa Shoten's seinen manga magazine Comp Ace between September 26 and November 26, 2008, compiling three chapters.

=== Music and audio CDs ===
FairlyLife's opening theme is "FairlyLife" sung by Miyuki Hashimoto, the insert song is "Sky" (ソラ, Sora) by Miki Tsuchiya, and the ending theme is "Smile" (笑顔にかえて, Egao ni Kaete) by Nana. The game's original soundtrack was released by Lantis on February 25, 2009, and contained thirty-five tracks.

Hooksoft released a combination drama and music CD on May 30, 2008, entitled FairlyLife The First Review "What are you doing?" which contains twelve tracks, ten drama and two music. The music tracks are the full version of FairlyLife's opening theme song "FairlyLife", and the instrumental version of that song. Five of the drama tracks contain short radio dramas, and the remaining four tracks cover two different stories split in two parts each. Hooksoft released another combination drama and music CD at Comiket 74 on August 17, 2008, entitled Midsummer's Large Neverland Free-for-all Fight! I Don't Want to Be An Adult (真夏のネバーランド大混戦!～大人になんてなりたくない～, Manatsu no Nebārando Daikonsen! Otona ni Nante Naritakunai). In addition to a new drama and the full version of FairlyLife's opening theme song, the CD also contains the full opening themes from the visual novels BackStage and Hare Hare Harem being produced by Hooksoft's sister brands TJR and Smee, respectively.
