= List of HoneyComing chapters =

HoneyComing is a Japanese adult visual novel developed by Hooksoft, released for the PC and PlayStation 2. The game has three manga adaptations, the first being HoneyComing: Sweet Love Lesson, a seinen manga illustrated by Ui Takano, which was serialized in Comptiq between the February 2007 and October 2008 issues. All 19 chapters were compiled into three tankōbon volumes and published by Kadokawa Shoten under their Kadokawa Comics Ace imprint between August 9, 2007 and October 10, 2008. A second manga adaptation, illustrated by Yuki Kiriga, and titled HoneComi The 4-koma, was serialized in the Dengeki G's Magazine, and later transferred to the Dengeki G's Festival! Comic between February 28, 2007 and April 25, 2009. ASCII Media Works released HoneComi The 4-koma as a single tankōbon volume on July 27, 2009, under their Dengeki Comics EX imprint.

Lastly, a manga illustrated by Akuru Uira called SweetHoneyComing, was serialized in Comp Ace between the March 2009 and July 2009 issues. Kadokawa Shoten later collected the manga into a single tankōbon volume on July 25, 2009, under their Kadokawa Comics Ace imprint.

== Chapter list ==
=== HoneyComing: Sweet Love Lesson ===
No.	Release date	ISBN
1	August 9, 2007	4-04-713951-3
001. The Starting Bell of Love; 002. Refreshing Minds; 003. The Duel After School; 004. My Sister Loves Color; 005. Milk and Chocolate of Homecoming
2	January 10, 2008	4-04-715008-8
006. Confession; 007. The Reason for Being Diligent; 008. Treasured Flower Language; 009. Mary and the Devil; 010. Other Side of the Smiling Face; 011. We Have No Clue?; 012. The Selfish Angel
3	October 10, 2008	4-04-715085-1
013. Prince Charming Syndrome; 014. Misunderstanding Love Circumstances; 015. Wild Strawberries; 016. Two-Way Thinking; 017. Although It's Not Enough...; 018. Honey Going; 019. Honey Coming

=== HoneComi The 4-koma ===
No.	Release date	ISBN
1	July 27, 2009	978-4-04-867966-4

=== SweetHoneyComing ===
No.	Release date	ISBN
1	July 25, 2009	978-4-04-715251-9
