= List of HoneyComing light novels =

Light novel volume 1 published by Harvest.

Two light novel series and one standalone publication have been published based on a Japanese adult visual novel called HoneyComing, which was developed by Hooksoft. The first series was written by Jōji Kamio, and illustrated by two artists, Makako Matsumoto, and Rakko. The first volume was published on October 25, 2007, and the third and final volume was published on July 25, 2008. GoodsTrain released all volumes under their TwinTail Novels imprint. A second light novel series was published by Harvest, under their Harvest Novels imprint. Hack and Masamune Yotsuya both authored the books, while Makako Matsumoto and Rakko worked as the illustrators again, respectively. Three novels were published in the second series released between December 1, 2007, and March 2008. Lastly, a light novel titled @HoneyComing RoyalSweet was written by Renri Akatsuki, and illustrated by Makako Matsumoto. Eagle Publishing released a single volume on January 15, 2010, under their Pumpkin Novels imprint.

== Volume list ==
=== HoneyComing (GoodsTrain) ===
| No. | Release date | ISBN |
|---|---|---|
| 1 | October 24, 2007 | 978-4-7756-0252-2 |
| 2 | February 25, 2008 | 978-4-7756-0285-0 |
| 3 | July 25, 2008 | 978-4-7756-0328-4 |

=== HoneyComing (Harvest) ===
| No. | Release date | ISBN |
|---|---|---|
| 1 | December 21, 2007 | 4-434-11212-0 |
| 2 | February 2008 | 4-434-11505-7 |
| 3 | April 2008 | 4-434-11694-0 |

=== @HoneyComing RoyalSweet ===
| No. | Release date | ISBN |
|---|---|---|
| 1 | January 15, 2010 | 4-861-46176-6 |
