= Like Life =

Japanese visual novel

- Like Life Renewal Edition visual novel cover.

ライク・ライフ (Raiku Raifu)
- Genre: Drama, Harem
- Video game
- Developer: Hooksoft
- Publisher: Hooksoft (Windows); GN Software (PS2/PSP); NTT DoCoMo (FOMA)
- Genre: Eroge, Visual novel
- Platform: Windows, PS2, FOMA, PSP
- Released: May 28, 2004 (Windows); April 28, 2005 (PS2); August 24, 2006 (PS2 re-release); August 17, 2007 (FOMA); September 28, 2007 (PC Renewal); October 1, 2009 (PSP)
- Light novel
- Written by: Jōji Kamio
- Illustrated by: Hirokō Buda; Araiguma
- Published by: Softgarage
- Original run: August 20, 2004 – April 15, 2005
- Volumes: 4
- Video game

Life Like Hyokoban
- Developer: Hooksoft
- Publisher: Hooksoft
- Genre: Eroge, Visual novel
- Platform: Windows
- Released: December 29, 2004

Like Life (ライク・ライフ, Raiku Raifu) is a Japanese adult visual novel developed by Hooksoft which was released on May 28, 2004 playable on Windows as a CD; a PlayStation 2 consumer console port called Like Life An Hour followed on April 28, 2005 by GN Software. An updated version of the original game released on September 28, 2007 called Like Life Renewal Edition (Like Life新装版, Like Life Shinsōban), compatible up to Windows Vista, is playable on Windows as a DVD. A PlayStation Portable version of the game titled Like Life Every Hour was released on October 1, 2009. The gameplay in Like Life follows a plot line which offers pre-determined scenarios with courses of interaction, and focuses on the appeal of the five female main characters. The story revolves around Kazuma Kōsaka who is living a normal life in his aunt's home while he attends high school. One day, objects all over town start turning into girls, and his mobile phone is no exception; after the transformation, Kazuma names her Himeko Kōsaka.

Four light novels based on Like Life were released between August 2004 and April 2005 written by Jōji Kamio. An adult fandisc for Hyoko, one of the supporting characters, was released at Comiket 67 on December 29, 2004 called Like Life Hyokoban, playable on Windows as a CD. There have been four drama CDs released: two bundled with the limited edition of the PS2 game, one with the original release of Life Like Hyokoban, and the last was based on the PS2 game version and was released in Japanese store in January 2005.

== Gameplay ==
The gameplay requires little interaction from the player as most of the duration of the game is spent on simply reading the text that will appear on the screen; this text represents either dialogue between the various characters, or the inner thoughts of the protagonist. Every so often, the player will come to a "decision point" where he or she is given the chance to choose from options that are displayed on the screen, typically two to three at a time. During these times, gameplay pauses until a choice is made that furthers the plot in a specific direction, depending on which choice the player makes.

There are five main plot lines that the player will have the chance to experience, one for each of the heroines in the story. In order to view the five plot lines to their entirety, the player will have to replay the game multiple times and choose different choices during the decision points in order to further the plot in an alternate direction.

== Plot ==
=== Story ===
Like Life's story revolves around Kazuma Kōsaka who had to move into his aunt's house due to his parents always being too busy. He lives next door to his childhood friend Yumi Miyasato, and the two of them walk together to Shimousanomiya Academy (下総ノ宮学園, Shimousanomiya Gakuen) which they both attend. One day at school, many strange transfer students arrive at school: all over town, objects start turning into girls, though they still retain some form of what they used to be on their person. Kazuma's mobile phone is no exception and turns into a girl he names Himeko Kōsaka. The concept of giving moe traits to inanimate objects is known as moe anthropomorphism.

=== Characters ===
==== Main characters ====
Kazuma Kōsaka (高坂 和真, Kōsaka Kazuma)
Kazuma is the protagonist of the story and is the person the player assumes. Both of his parents are working overseas, so he came to live at his aunt's house. He is almost never in contact with his parents, which is in stark contrast to the kind environment he finds himself in with his friends.

The girls of Like Life: Tsubaki (top-left), Kizuna (top-right), Atori (center), Yumi (bottom-left), and Himeko (bottom-right).

Yumi Miyasato (宮里 結未, Miyasato Yumi)
Voiced by: Mayumi Shindō (Windows/PS2)
Yumi is Kazuma's childhood friend who lives next door to him. She is always cheerful, and is a natural airhead. She often refers to Kazuma as "Kazu-kun". Every morning, she climbs over the veranda between her home and Kazuma's and enters into his room to wake him up for school. She comes over to his house so often, it is almost as if she lives there, and she is treated like a member of Kazuma's family. She always wears a pea-green ribbon in her hair. She is a health-food nut and is extremely popular at her school; so much so that she even has bodyguards to protect her from the constant attention.

Himeko Kōsaka (高坂 姫子, Kōsaka Himeko)
Voiced by: Junko Kusayanagi (Windows/PS2)
Himeko was, at one point, Kazuma's favorite mobile phone, but one day she transformed into a beautiful young high school girl. At first, Kazuma did not believe that she used to be his cell phone for he did not witness the transformation. In fact, the first time he saw her was in his room sitting down wearing a wedding dress, which is what she originally was wearing after her transformation. Somehow, she gets admitted into Kazuma's school and gets into his class. She retains a bit of her former self on her appearance: there is one cell phone strap above each of her ears, and the antenna is still visible behind her left ear. Despite the transformation, Himeko still functions as a cell phone. For example, every time Kazuma gets a text message, she sings the game's opening song "GirlsLife" to signify this, but since it happens often, she tends to be out of breath. If her battery is running low, she will start to appear as if she is sick, and must recharge via connecting a recharger to her power source located on her chest. This way, she does not have to eat like the other objects that turned into girls.

Tsubaki Sawaki (沢木 椿, Sawaki Tsubaki)
Voiced by: Shino Kujō (Windows), Yūko Gotō (PS2)
Tsubaki is a girl who transfers into Kazuma's class; she has a weak body, but a strong-willed personality. When she first found out about Himeko living in Kazuma's house, she hinted at the fact that he may be a lolicon. Her sickness is not stated, but she constantly coughs up blood, possibly due to a lung hemorrhage. She enjoys acting superior to others she deems to be unworthy of her time. Sometimes she behaves differently around Kazuma, likening her to a tsundere character type.

She is in fact not the real Tsubaki, but merely a personification of the real Tsubaki as a transfer student into Kazuma's school; she is presented as an older identical twin of the real Tsubaki. The fake Tsubaki constantly worries about her real counterpart and looks after her. This is because the real Tsubaki has been hospitalized for a long time, and since the hospital bills are so expensive, a rift has built up between Tsubaki and her parents, leaving her more or less alone. Years before, she attended the same school as Kazuma and admired him from afar, but she was never able to tell him how she felt since she became hospitalized.

Atori Arikawa (有川 あとり, Arikawa Atori)
Voiced by: Marina Ono (Windows/PS2)
Atori is another girl who transfers into Kazuma's class; she is introverted, always tends to be nervous, and constantly falls down because of it. After her beloved grandmother died, she closed herself off and became introverted. She has a natural gift when it comes to cooking. She generally attempts to avoid physical contact with others, but is close with any of the objects that turned into girls. Due to this, she was early on able to become friends with Himeko and Tsubaki. She never goes without wearing earmuffs to hide her red-colored ears. It is later revealed in the visual fanbook that she is Sōya's younger sister.

Kizuna Rindōji (竜胆寺 絆, Rindōji Kizuna)
Voiced by: Kiyomi Asai (Windows/PS2)
Kizuna is yet another girl who transfers into Kazuma's class. She is a wealthy girl, who is in fact supposed to be a first year high school student, but used her money to skip a grade and get into Kazuma's class. She first met Kazuma as a child, and ever since has adored him. She is not only selfish, but she hates to lose, and tries to use her standing in society for her own benefit. She even went as far as to buy the school she attends and brought her own desk from her home; she mainly has no common sense about how the world works.

==== Supporting characters ====
Tae Yamazaki (山崎 妙, Yamazaki Tae)
Voiced by: Mai Goto (Windows), Eriko Fujimaki (PS2)
Tae is Kazuma's aunt; she took him in while his parents are overseas. She loves to play dirty tricks on Makoto in an attempt to allure him with her feminine charm, though she also acts like a normal guardian. She has a youthful appearance and personality, so when she is called "Oba-san" (おばさん; lit. "aunt", but also implies middle-aged), she gets really angry and has even gone so far as to throw knives at Makoto for doing so. After her refrigerator and vacuum cleaner turned into girls, she became their godparent. She is usually hard to figure out, and is readily aberrant.

Ichigeki Kodera (小寺 一撃, Kodera Ichigeki)
Voiced by: Kazunari Tanaka (Windows/PS2)
Ichigeki is Kazuma's delinquent friend who is in love with Yumi. His family owns a temple, to which he is the heir. Outwardly, he appears to be a typical gang member, though he wears a wig to make himself took tougher. His personality changes when around girls he likes, and is always trying to go after Yumi. He is the leader of the bodyguard squad that protects Yumi while at school. His dream is to one day be a shōjo manga author. In fact, Tsubaki gives him high praise for his artistic ability.

Shōko Usui (碓井 祥子, Usui Shōko)
Voiced by: Natsumi Yanase (Windows/PS2)
Shōko is Kazuma's homeroom teacher. She is typically unhappy, and was flustered when objects in town started turning into girls. In the classroom, she lacks confidence and often asks her mother for help after school.

Itsuki Kobayashi (小林 唯月, Kobayashi Itsuki)
Voiced by: Kozue Yoshizumi (Windows/PS2)
Itsuki is one of the maids at Kizuna's mansion. She has a stern personality towards Kizuna, and has the tendency to shun others. At Kizuna's mansion, there are other maids, but they are all identical to Itsuki. This came about when various objects in the mansion all transformed into Itsuki.

Sōya (総哉)
Voiced by: Unknown (PC), Eiji Miyashita (PS2)
Sōya is a man who constantly smokes cigarettes, has silver hair, and has sanpaku-eyes. He is Mitsuba's owner, and always keeps her nearby. He is Atori's older brother.

==== Former objects ====
Okiru (起留)
Voiced by: Kiyomi Asai (Windows/PS2)
Okiru is Kazuma's former alarm clock. She has a rude personality, and will wake Kazuma up by hitting him with one of her hammers.

Akari (あかり)
Voiced by: Kozue Yoshizumi (Windows/PS2)
Akari is Kazuma's former desk lamp. Her light source comes from under the skirt she wears, and must flip the skirt to illuminate anything; due to this, she is extremely embarrassed.

Hyoko (氷庫, Hyōko)
Voiced by: Kozue Yoshizumi (Windows/PS2)
Hyoko is Kazuma's former refrigerator. She enjoys ridiculing Kazuma. Originally she went unsold, but after she transformed, she thanked Tae for buying her. She appears in the fandisc Like Life Hyokoban as the main heroine.

Tōka (トウカ)
Voiced by: Megumi Kobayashi (Windows/PS2)
Tōka is a former post box on a street corner in town. While originally being eighty years old, she looks like a youthful girl, but still retains the wisdom of someone in their late years.

Keshiko (消し子)
Voiced by: Megumi Kobayashi (Windows/PS2)
Keshiko is the former blackboard eraser from Kazuma's class. She makes a small cameo appearance in the _Summer original video animation mini-series.

Kōmon (校門)
Voiced by: Kana Fumizuki (Windows/PS2)
Kōmon is the former front school gate of Kazuma's school. She often cites the fault of others.

Mako (マコ)
Voiced by: Mai Gotō (Windows), Eriko Fujimaki (PS2)
Mako is the former coffee pot in the teacher's lounge at Kazuma's school; she was originally Shōko Usui's. At first she is terrible at making coffee, but after she makes friends with Shōko, she gets better at the task.

Nobuko (信子)
Voiced by: Kozue Yoshizumi (Windows/PS2)
Nobuko is a former traffic light. She has a strong sense of justice, and will call those who run red lights evil.

Mitsuba (三葉)
Voiced by: Kana Fumizuki (Windows/PS2)
Mitsuba is a former sex doll owned by Sōya, who she is almost always together with. In the PlayStation 2 version, she was changed to be a former child's doll.

Kiyori Kōsaka (高坂 浄, Kōsaka Kiyori)
Voiced by: Natsumi Yanase (Windows/PS2)
Kiyori is Tae's former long-time favorite vacuum cleaner. The vacuum cleaner hose is unified with her single-braided hair. She has the habit of belittling herself after she makes a mistake. When a room gets dirty, she would rather choose suicide than not clean it.

Kagari (篝)
Voiced by: Natsumi Yanase (Windows/PS2)
Kagari is a former Maneki Neko owned by Atori's family. She was bought around eighty years ago, and was once owned by Atori's late grandmother. She is content with living a solitary life and acting as Atori's guardian. Kagari always is at odds with Kazuma.

== Development ==
=== Release history ===
Like Life was first introduced to the public in Japan on May 28, 2004 as a CD-ROM playable on Windows. A version for the PlayStation 2, retaining its adult rating, called Like Like an hour, was developed by GN Software and released in Japan on April 28, 2005 in limited and regular editions. The regular edition PS2 game featured a different cover than the limited edition. The limited edition PS2 release came bundled with two drama CDs entitled Like Life radio hour and Like Life Typical Hot Spring Traveler's Journal (Life Like的温泉紀行, Like Life Teki Onsen Kikō), and a music CD containing twenty-one tracks used in the game. The PS2 version was re-released at a cheaper price on August 24, 2006, and its rating dropped to ages seventeen and up. A portable version, playable on FOMA cellular phones, was produced by NTT DoCoMo on August 17, 2007. Various patches were released as free downloads to update the original game ranging between version 1.1 to version 1.4. An updated version of the original game called Like Life Renewal Edition (Like Life新装版, Like Life Shinsōban) was released on September 28, 2007 compatible up to Windows Vista playable as a DVD; Life Like Renewal Edition retailed for 6,800 yen. A version playable on the PlayStation Portable called Like Life Every Hour was released by GN Software on October 1, 2009 with a CERO rating of C (ages 15 and older).

== Related media ==
Like Life novel volume 1.

=== Light novels ===
There have been four character light novels based on the game written by Japanese author Jōji Kamio, with illustrations by Hirokō Buda and Araiguma, published by Softgarage. The novels contain adult material not suitable for children. The first novel covers Himeko, the second covers Yumi, and the last two are general novels entitled Omnibus. The first novel was released on August 20, 2004, and the final novel was released on April 15, 2005.

=== Fandisc ===
A fandisc sequel of sorts based on the Like Life visual novel entitled Like Life Amusement Disc "Hyokoban" (Like Life 氷庫版; meaning "Like Life Hyoko Edition") was released by Hooksoft at Comiket 67 on December 29, 2004 playable as a CD on Windows. A popularity contest was held earlier in 2004 to decide who should be the focus of the fandisc, and Hyoko, one of the supporting characters, was ranked first. The original version was available at Comiket and came bundled with a drama CD. The game was first sold outside of Comiket on January 6, 2005.

=== Music and audio CDs ===
Like Life's opening theme is "GirlsLife" sung by Miyuki Hashimoto, the ending theme is "Reach Out" (届きますように, Todokimasu Yōni) sung by Nana, and there the insert song "Sky and Rain and Rainbows and" (空と雨と虹と, Sora to Ame to Niji to), also sung by Miyuki Hashimoto. The game's original soundtrack was released by Lantis on July 22, 2004 and contained twenty-four tracks. A drama CD entitled Drama CD Like Like an hour: Winter and a Festival and an Untied Ribbon (ドラマCD Like Life an hour ～冬と祭と解けたリボン～, Dorama CD Like Life an hour ~Fuyu to Matsuri to Hodoketa Ribon~) was released on December 29, 2005 and contained seven tracks.

== Reception ==
Like Life was the second-most widely sold game in May 2004 in Japan on Getchu.com, a major redistributor of visual novel and domestic anime products. In Getchu.com's sales ranking, it only fell behind Circus' Da Capo Plus Communication, which ranked first, but did beat Clannad in sales that month, which ranked No. 3. The game made another appearance in the charts and ranked No. 18 in the following month. For the first half of year 2004 on Getchu.com, Life Life ranked seventh in sales, and for the entirety of 2004 on Getchu.com, it ranked No. 14.
