= Nostradamus ni Kiite Miro =

2008 video game

Nostradamus ni Kiite Miro♪
- Developer(s): Lime
- Publisher(s): Lime
- Designer(s): Akira
- Platform(s): Windows
- Release: February 29, 2008
- Genre(s): Visual novel, Eroge
- Mode(s): Single player

Nostradamus ni Kiite Miro♪ (ノストラダムスに聞いてみろ♪, Nosutoradamusu ni Kiite Miro♪, lit. Try Asking Nostradamus♪) is the first visual novel developed by Navel's sister brand Lime.

The story concerns a girl who suddenly appears in front of Nagi Tsukuba, the protagonist, claiming to be the incarnation of Nostradamus' The Prophecies. She claims that it is somehow his fault that the world did not end in July 1999 (as supposedly predicted in century 10, quatrain 72), and that Nostradamus, being extremely bothered by this, has sent her to prove to Nagi that the prophecies are to be respected.

== Characters ==
=== Main characters ===
Nagi Tsukuba (筑波 那岐, Tsukuba Nagi)
Nagi is the main hero in Nostradamus ni Kiite Miro♪ and the role the player assumes.

Stra (ストラ, Sutora)
Voiced by: Harumi Sakurai
Stra is the proclaimed Nostradamus Prophecy. She's brave and positive.

Thiya (ティア, Tia)
Voiced by: Ryōko Tanaka
Thiya is the encarnation of Agastya.

Kukuri Shirayama (白山 菊理, Shirayama Kukuri)
Voiced by: Mahiru Kaneda
Kukuri is Thiya's owner. Claims that she will be Nagi's wife in the future.

Sakuya Sengen (浅間 咲耶, Sengen Sakuya)
Voiced by: Akane Tomonaga
Chikuya is the most popular girl at school.

Honoka Akiba (秋葉 穂ノ香, Akiba Honoka)
Voiced by: Honoka Imuraya
Honoka is Nagi's sister-in-law.

=== Sub characters ===
Mizuha Nyukawakami (丹生川上 水波, Nyukawakami Mizuha)
Voiced by: Hina Kamimura

Sano Hikawa (氷川 佐之, Hikawa Sano)
Voiced by: Junji Majima

Nami Akiha (秋葉 那美, Akiha Nami)
Voiced by: Hitomi (voice actress)

Chiru Uemiya (梅宮 智瑠, Uemiya Chiru)
Voiced by: Fūka

Hime Shirayama (白山 媛, Shirayama Hime)
Voiced by: Emi Motoi

Nostradamus (ノストラダムス, Nosutoradamusu)
Voiced by: Takehito Koyasu

=== Other ===
Masato (真聡)
Masato is a boy who always appears in Navel and Lime games peeking at the girls' underwear.
