= Kaminuma =

Kaminuma (written: 上沼 or 神沼) is a Japanese surname. Notable people with the surname include:

- Emiko Kaminuma (上沼 恵美子), Japanese singer

== Fictional characters ==
- Kiriko Kaminuma (神沼 桐子), a character in the visual novel Orange Pocket

== See also ==
- Kaminuma Bluff, a bluff on Ross Island, Antarctica
- Kaminuma Crag, a nunatak of Antarctica
