= Ashiro =

Ashiro may refer to:

- Ashiro, Iwate, town in Japan
- Megu Ashiro (亜城 めぐ) (born 1978), Japanese voice actress
