= Summer (video game) =

Japanese adult visual novel

- _Summer
- _Summer original visual novel cover.

アンダーバーサマー (Andābā samā)
- Genre: Drama, Harem, Romance
- Video game
- Developer: Hooksoft
- Publisher: Hooksoft (Windows); GN Software (PS2)
- Genre: Eroge, Visual novel
- Platform: Windows, PlayStation 2
- Released: July 15, 2005 (Windows); August 24, 2006 (PS2); October 4, 2007 (PS2 re-release); December 21, 2007 (PC Renewal)
- Light novel
- Written by: Jōji Kamio
- Illustrated by: Makako Matsuhita (cover); Araiguma
- Published by: Softgarage
- Imprint: Sofgare Novels
- Original run: October 14, 2005 – September 25, 2006
- Volumes: 4
- Original video animation
- Directed by: Takahiro Okao
- Produced by: Softgarage
- Studio: Rikuentai
- Released: October 27, 2006 – January 26, 2007
- Runtime: 30 minutes each
- Episodes: 2

_Summer (アンダーバーサマー, Andābā Samā), also known as Underbar Summer, is a Japanese adult visual novel developed by Hooksoft which was released on July 15, 2005, playable on Windows as a CD; a PlayStation 2 consumer console port called _Summer## followed on August 24, 2006, by GN Software. An updated version of the original game, called _Summer Renewal Edition (_Summer新装版, _Summer Shinsōban), which is compatible up to Windows Vista as a DVD, was released on December 21, 2007.

The gameplay in _Summer follows a plot line which offers pre-determined scenarios with courses of interaction, and focuses on the appeal of the six female main characters. The story revolves around Takumi Kaizu, who after years of making good friends, many of whom are female, is asked by his best male friend Osamu Funada if he likes anyone. With his last summer in high school quickly approaching, Takumi decides to find someone to like by the end of summer vacation. _Summer has had overall well received sales, premiering as the most sold bishōjo game in Japan during the first half of July in 2005, and would go on to chart twice more.

_Summer has made several transitions into other media, such as a mini four-panel web comic, a manga one-shot published in Kadokawa Shoten's Comp Ace magazine, and four character light novels written by Jōji Kamio. An illustrated story titled _Summer## Official Illust Story was serialized in MediaWorks' Dengeki G's Magazine. A two-episode original video animation was produced; the two DVDs were released on October 27, 2006, and January 26, 2007. Several drama CDs were released based on the game, including one released as a prologue to the OVA.

== Gameplay ==
Example of what average conversation looks like in _Summer. Here, Takumi is talking with Konami.

_Summer is a romance visual novel in which the player assumes the role of Takumi Kaizu. The gameplay requires little interaction from the player as most of the duration of the game is spent on simply reading the text that appears on the screen; this text represents either dialogue between the various characters, or the inner thoughts of the protagonist. Every so often, the player will come to a "decision point" and must choose from options that are displayed on the screen, typically two to three at a time.

During these times, gameplay pauses until a choice is made that furthers the plot in a specific direction, depending on which choice the player makes. There are six main plot lines that the player will have the chance to experience, one for each of the heroines in the story. In order to view the six plot lines to their entirety, the player will have to replay the game multiple times and choose different choices during the decision points in order to further the plot in an alternate direction.

Throughout gameplay, there are scenes depicting Kyōtarō and a given heroine having sex. However, in the PlayStation 2 port, these scenes are removed. The visual novel also features real-time choices (RTC), this is when the player given a choice within a time period, and varying on the amount of time the player takes to make the choice, it will affect the ensuing dialogue.

== Plot ==
=== Story and setting ===
_Summer's story takes place in a small seaside town during the summer, where Takumi Kaizu is a normal high school student enjoying his final year in school with the rest of his friends. Over the years, he has made good memories with these friends of his, most of whom are girls, though apparently still have no overt feelings of attraction towards any of them. There are six main potential love interests presented to Takumi in _Summer; they are Konami Hatano, Shino Ebizuka, Sana Kaizu, Chiwa Amano, Wakana Shimazu, and Hinako Nanao.

Konami is the kind and timid childhood friend of Takumi, and the main heroine. She will come to Takumi's house in the morning and prepare breakfast for him. As a contrast to Konami's gentle personality, her female friend Shino is rough and hot-tempered, but protective of Konami. Takumi has a younger stepsister called Sana, an energetic, fun-loving girl, if not a little lazy for being unable to wake up in the morning without Takumi. Sana has a best friend called Chiwa, a mysterious and very strange girl, who is known to be unpredictable. An upperclassman called Wakana has an immense crush on Takumi, despite her popularity with boys due to her beauty and elegant personality. The homeroom teacher of Takumi, named Hinako, will often be seen trying to find free food because of her money wasting.

When Takumi is asked by his best male friend Osamu Funada if he likes anyone, Takumi starts to think about it though is still confused on what to do next. With his last summer in high school quickly approaching, Takumi decides to find someone to like by the end of summer vacation. Takumi slowly starts to take a romantic interest in the girls around him, while his friend Osamu relentlessly searches for a girlfriend as well.

=== Characters ===
==== Main characters ====
Takumi Kaizu (海津匠, Kaizu Takumi)
Voiced by: Takashi Kondo (OVA)
Takumi is the protagonist of the story. He is a high school student who enjoys the time he's been spending with his close friends and wants it to last as long as it can. Despite having many beautiful girls as good friends, Takumi still has no attraction towards any of them, though when his friend Osamu Funade asks him if there's anyone he likes, he decides to try to find an answer to that question by the end of the next summer vacation which is right around the corner. He has a younger step sister called Sana.

The girls of _Summer: Hinako (top-left), Wakana (top-right), Chiwa (center-left), Sana (center-right), Shino (bottom-left), and Konami (bottom-right).

Konami Hatano (波多野小奈美, Hatano Konami)
Voiced by: Maki Izumi (game) / Natsumi Yanase (OVA)
Konami is the main heroine who usually has a quiet, timid personality, though is also very helping. She is the seagull-loving childhood friend of Takumi and even goes as far as to go over to Takumi's house every morning and make him breakfast. Konami is a close friend of Shino Ebizuka, though they are not alike personality wise.

Shino Ebizuka (海老塚信乃, Ebizuka Shino)
Voiced by: Mahiru Kaneda (game) / Yuki Kajita (OVA)
Shino is Konami's closest female friend who has a tough personality. She often acts in ways to defend Konami or react strongly on her behalf when she will not speak up over certain matters. She has shown herself to have a temper and often will get angry at Osamu's repeated perverted actions, which often earns him a beating on Shino's behalf.

Sana Kaizu (海津沙奈, Kaizu Sana)
Voiced by: Junko Kusayanagi (game/OVA) / Junko Nakata (PS2)
Sana is Takumi's younger step-sister by one year who lives with him, though there is no blood relation between them. She most often has an active personality when awake, though still has problems getting up for school during the week despite now being in high school. Her best friend is Chiwa Amano who hangs out with her constantly.

Chiwa Amano (天野千輪, Amano Chiwa)
Voiced by: Minami Kitato (game) / Hitomi (OVA)
Chiwa is Sana's best friend who has an odd personality. She always speaks with a silent tone and will often point the obvious during times relating to something perverted that either Takumi or Osamu have done. She will usually do certain things that give her a creepy visage and is known to be unpredictable.

Wakana Shimazu (島津若菜, Shimazu Wakana)
Voiced by: Yukari Aoyama (game) / Akane Tomonaga (OVA)
Wakana is a very beautiful girl who is one year above Takumi. She seems to have a crush on Takumi, of which he is unaware of. At school, Yuno Kawakami will often follow her around either helping her out with simple things or by fending off pushy guys with a wooden sword.

Hinako Nanao (七緒日向子, Nanao Hinako)
Voiced by: Mia Naruse (game/OVA) / Semio Nono (PS2)
Hinako is Takumi's homeroom teacher. She is apparently hooked on buying strange and often useless mail-order products with the money she earns in her job. Since most of her money is spent in this fashion, she is usually found wandering the halls of the student cafeteria during lunchtime in hopes of getting free food. Hinako has a teacher friend called Kasumi.

==== Supporting characters ====
Yuno Kawakami (川上由乃, Kawakami Yuno)
Voiced by: Aoi Kamizuki (game) / Megumi Kobayashi (OVA)
Yuno is a second-year girl who will follow Wakana around school, protecting her with a wooden sword from pushy guys or just helping her with simple things like purchasing meal tickets at the cafeteria. She has a forceful personality which helps whenever she is protecting Wakana, whom she addresses while adding the Japanese honorific sama (さま) to the end of her name as a sign of intense respect.

Kasumi Suda (梳田 かすみ, Suda Kasumi)
Voiced by: Hikaru Issiki (game) / Ryouko Tanaka (OVA)
Kasumi is a teacher from another school and a friend of Hinako's. She has a cool, collected, and generally kind personality.

Chizuru Tachibana (立花 智鶴, Tachibana Chizuru)
Voiced by: Hikaru Isshiki (game)
Chizuru is a young woman who is a Yamato nadeshiko, which means the "personification of an idealized Japanese woman". Chizuru is also the tea ceremony club adviser. Most of the time, she is a calm and composed person, however, she is scary when made angry.

Osamu Funade (船田治, Funada Osamu)
Voiced by: Yūga Takane (game) / Kenji Nojima (OVA)
Osamu is Takumi's best male friend who has a bold personality, often not turning up the chance to peek at a girl changing her clothes or is otherwise partially or completely naked. Shino will attempt to beat him to persuade him otherwise, though despite this he still finds some way to get around her onslaughts. Due to this personality, it can be said that he has perhaps a higher than average liking to the opposite sex, something Takumi himself has noted. His nickname is Funamushi, meaning sea slater.

Ochimusha Master (落ち武者マスター, Masutā Ochimusha)
Voiced by: Oirī Wana (game) / Hikaru Hanada (OVA)
An old man who owns a cafe, where Takumi and the others will often visit. His real name and age are a mystery. He is often seen smoking tobacco, and likes to give advice to those who are in need.

== Development and release ==
Makako Matsuhita and Racco worked as the character designers and illustrators for the game, while Mujin Kawanami and Celsior were the scenario writers, but primarily Mujin. Rohei Yamane mostly took charge of graphics, however, Uto Yakamoto and Mitsuki assisted in this. Uto also worked as the event planner. All art was directed by Radio Fish (officially written as RADiO FiSH), and Hattan handled the background coloring. Music in the game was provided by Takao Matsuura, and sound effects by VII. Ichirouji worked as the programmer, and Noah Kuroki handled the editing. Kei took the job of being the general manager, and Akira Asami was the game's producer. The chief writer of the game, Mujin Kawanami, also worked as the director, and Yoshimi Kuze takes credit as the voice director.

_Summer is self-described as a "laid-back school romance love comedy adventure game" (まったり純恋学園ラブコメADV, Mattari Jun Koi Gakuen Rabu Kome ADV), according to Hooksoft. _Summer was released in Japan on July 15, 2005, as a CD-ROM playable on Windows. A version for the PlayStation 2 with adult content removed, called _Summer## (アンダーバーサマー ダブルシャープ, Andābā Samā Daburu Shāpu; read as Underbar Summer Double Sharp), was developed by GN Software and released in Japan on August 24, 2006, in limited and regular editions. The limited edition PS2 release came bundled with a drama CD, a cell phone strap featuring Konami Hatano, and a double-sided hug pillowcase, also featuring Konami. The PS2 version was re-released at a cheaper price on October 4, 2007. An updated version of the original game, called _Summer Renewal Edition (_Summer新装版, _Summer Shinsōban), which is compatible up to Windows Vista as a DVD, was released on December 21, 2007.

== Related media ==
_Summer novel volume 2.

=== Print media ===
Before the visual novel's official release, a four-panel web comic illustrated by Haruka Ogataya began serialization on Hooksoft's official website from April 27 to July 4, 2005. These and Like Life's comic strips were later published in the MTG corner of Enterbrain's Tech Gian magazine. In the comic, characters are drawn to give the appearance of chibis. A one-shot manga illustrated by Kankiriko for _Summer was published by Kadokawa Shoten and was published in the Japanese video game magazine Comp Ace in its June 2005 issue.

There have been four erotic character light novels based on the game written by Japanese author Jōji Kamio and illustrated by Araiguma, published by Softgarage under their Sofgare Novels imprint. Cover illustrations for all four volumes were by Makako Matsushita. The first novel covers Konami, the second covers both Chiwa and Sana, the third covers Shino and Wakana, and the fourth is a general novel titled Omnibus. The first novel was released on October 14, 2005, and the final novel was released on September 25, 2006. A six-chapter illustrated story of _Summer##, titled _Summer## Official Illust Story, was serialized in MediaWorks' Dengeki G's Magazine between the March and August 2006 issues. There would be one chapter per issue focusing on a different heroine. It was written by Mujin Kawanami, also the chief writer for the game, and illustrated by two artists, Makako Matsuhita and Racco, who worked as the illustrators for the game.

Two visual fan books have been published for _Summer. The first, entitled _Summer Visual Fan Book, was published by Kill Time Communication in November 2005. The book consists of 135 pages and contains a character and story introduction, an illustration gallery, voice actor and staff interviews, strategy guides, and more. A 129-page visual fan book, titled _Summer ## Perfect Visual Book, was published for the PlayStation 2 port of the game by MediaWorks in August 2006. The visual fan book contains part of a six-chapter illustrated story called _Summer## Official Illust Story, a drama CD of _Summer##, voice cast interviews, character introductions, and ecchi illustrations.

=== Music and drama CDs ===
_Summer's opening theme from the game is "Love Song" (こいのうた, Koi no Uta) sung by Miyuki Hashimoto, and the ending theme from the game is "Important Person" (たいせつなひと, Taisetsu na Hito) by YuNa; "Important Person" was also used as an insert song. The game's original soundtrack was released by Lantis on November 23, 2005, and contained thirty-one tracks. In July 2005, Messe Sanoh released a retailer bonus CD titled _Summer Original Arrange SoundTracks. A maxi single containing the opening and ending themes of the OVA was released on September 29, 2006. The OVA's opening theme is "Soda Water and Paper Airplanes" (ソダ水とひこうき雲, Sodasui to Hikoukigumo) by Yuma Kosaka, and the OVA's ending theme is "_Summer", also by Yuma Kosaka. A soundtrack consisting of nine tracks titled Underbar Summer Soundtrack with Drama was released by Hooksoft on July 25, 2005, and it also came bundled with the limited edition of the _Summer game. It contains two in-game songs, a 20-minute-long drama, and the six heroines' background music leitmotifs. Konami's theme is "Kamome no Uta" (カモメの唄, Song of the Seagull); Shino's theme is "Kiyoku Tadashiku" (清く正しく, Purely Correct); Sana's theme is "Otona no Kaidan" (大人の階段, Stairs of an Adult); Chiwa's theme is "Chīsana Negai" (小さな願い, A Small Wish); Wakana's theme is "Hatsukoi" (初恋, First Love), and lastly, Hinako's theme is "Himawari" (ひまわり, Sunflower).

There are several drama CDs based on the series produced by different companies. Hooksoft released a drama CD called _Summer The Secret Disc Character Voice Drama Collection on December 29, 2004, which contains six tracks, each track featuring a different heroine. The six tracks came bundled with the April 2005 issue of Enterbrain's Tech Gian magazine. The first produced set of drama CDs contains three CDs titled _Summer: Everblue Days released between December 29, 2005, and April 21, 2006, by Marine Entertainment. On August 24, 2006, a drama CD titled _Summer## Appendix Special Drama CD was released by Hooksoft; it contains two discs, each track has a different heroine's story. The drama CD was included in the perfect visual book. On the same day, a drama CD titled _summer## First Press Bonus Drama CD was released, containing one disc of fifteen tracks. Another CD was released on September 29, 2006, by Softgarage as a prologue to the OVA series.

=== Anime ===
An original video animation (OVA) series produced by animation studio Rikuentai, and directed by Takahiro Okao, was distributed by Softgarage. Softgarage released the first episode of the _Summer OVA in Japan as a DVD titled _Summer Season 1 on October 27, 2006, in both regular and limited editions, and the second episode was released as a DVD titled _Summer Season 2 on January 26, 2007, also in both regular and limited editions. The limited editions were released on UMD (Universal Media Disc), and include illustrations by the staff of Hooksoft. After the ending credits of the two episodes, there is a short, humorous bonus episode around five minutes long each. Takumi Kaizu, who was not voiced in the game, is voiced by Takashi Kondo in the OVA.

The anime's opening theme, "Soda Water and Contrails" (ソダ水とひこうき雲, Sodasui to Hikoukigumo), is sung by Yuma Kosaka, who also provided vocals for the anime's ending theme, "_Summer". A character from Like Life named Keshiko makes a small cameo appearance as the blackboard eraser in both episodes, though she is left unnamed in the OVA series. Like Life is an earlier visual novel by Hooksoft released on May 28, 2004.

==== Episodes ====
No.	Title	Original release date
1	"Is There Anyone You Like?" "Suki na yatsu, inai no ka?" (好きなやつ、いないのか?)	October 27, 2006
Takumi Kaizu has just returned from a trip to the hotsprings and now summer vacation is almost here, however first comes the Tanabata festival. When asked by his best friend if he likes anyone, Takumi is unsure on how to respond.
2	"I Wish Everyone Could Stay Like This Forever" "Minna ga itsu made mo kono mama de iraremasu yō ni" (みんながいつまでもこのままでいられますように)	January 26, 2007
Summer vacation has come and the group of friends decide to meet up together to watch the fireworks of the fireworks festival up on a lighthouse. While Takumi is there, he remembers some memories that he shared with Konami when they were younger.

=== Miscellaneous ===
Solid Theater has produced two PVC figures for _Summer. They are of the characters Konami and Chiwa, and were released in February 2007. Character goods such as phone danglers, an underlay, a clear file, a mouse pad, and fastener accessories were all produced by Exhaust, and sold at Comiket. Also, a dakimakura cover depicting Konami was produced by Axia; the cover came bundled with the limited edition PS2 release.

At Comiket 68, a paper bag containing _Summer and Like Life related items was given out. The bag contained a CD folder, a mini-clock depicting two characters from Like Life, Okiru and Keshiko (the latter had a cameo appearance in the _Summer OVA series), a mini lantern imitating the lanterns from the fictional shrine in _Summer, a cold bottle cover, a booklet-type post card set, a sticker set, a bookmark, a drawn underlay, a telephone card, and lastly, a drama CD.

An adult fan disc to _Summer and Like Life, titled _Summer Life (アンダーバーサマーライフ, Andābā Samā Raifu; Underbar Summer Life) was released for Windows by Hooksoft on December 16, 2005. The disc includes a collection of wallpapers, screen savers, and opening movies for both _Summer and Like Life, as well as unpublished voice actor interviews.

== Reception ==
The Japanese video game magazine Famitsu reviewed the PlayStation 2 port of the game _Summer##, and gave it a total review score of 20/40 (out of the four individual review scores of 5, 6, 5, and 4). According to a national sales ranking of bishōjo games sold in Japan, the PC release of _Summer premiered at No. 1 during the first half of July 2005. The game made another appearance in the charts during the second half of July, and ranked as the 18th most sold game, before charting for the last time as the 40th most sold game during the first half of August.

On Getchu.com, a major redistributor of visual novel and domestic anime products, _Summer was ranked as the most widely sold game in Japan in July 2005, the month and year of the visual novel's release. The visual novel failed to chart further, but it was ranked as the fifth most widely sold game of 2005 on Getchu.com, but outranked by Tsuyokiss, Yoake Mae yori Ruriiro na, Fate/hollow ataraxia, and To Heart 2 XRATED, which ranked first. _Summer did however beat visual novels such as Happiness!, Tick Tack!, Tomoyo After: It's a Wonderful Life, and School Days in sales that year. The theme song for _Summer appeared in Tech Gian's The Best Hits listing in September 2009.

Hooksoft held a popularity poll for the characters of _Summer between August 5–26, 2005. With a total of 15,740 votes, results were rallied up and announced on September 26, 2005, and recorded in the download section. Konami came in first place with a total of 4,196 votes, and with 4004 votes, Chiwa came second. Wakana came third with 2,616 votes; with 1,757 votes, Shino came fourth. Sana came fifth with 1,297 votes; with 484 votes, Yuno came sixth, and Hinako came seventh scoring 472 votes. Six other characters were included in the poll. As a prize for gathering the most votes, a downloadable wallpaper featuring Konami was made available on the website in various resolutions.
