= Shōjo Sect =

Japanese adult yuri manga series

- Logo of the OVA

少女セクト (Shōjo Sekuto)
- Genre: Erotic (Yuri)
- Manga
- Written by: Kenn Kurogane
- Published by: Core Magazine
- Magazine: Comic MegaStore
- Original run: June 17, 2003 – June 17, 2005
- Volumes: 2
- Original video animation

Shōjo Sect: Innocent Lovers
- Studio: Amarcord
- Released: July 25, 2008 – November 25, 2008
- Episodes: 3

Shōjo Sect (少女セクト, Shōjo Sekuto) is a Japanese adult yuri manga series written and illustrated by Kenn Kurogane. The manga was serialized in the adult manga magazine Comic MegaStore from June 17, 2003, to June 17, 2005, and was later released as two bound volumes. A limited single bound volume anthology was released in 2015 in Japanese convenience stores to commemorate the start of the series ten years ago, containing a new extra chapter. A three-part OVA series titled Shōjo Sect: Innocent Lovers, animated by Amarcord, was announced in April 2008 with the first episode released in July and concluded with its third and final episode in November 2008.

== Plot ==
The story revolves around the main protagonists Shinobu Handa and Momoko Naitou. They have known each other since childhood and Shinobu fell in love with Momoko from the first day they met. Now enrolled in Kagome Academy, an all-girls school, Momoko has forgotten about the past, but Shinobu has not. Both follow their own ways, but Shinobu still hopes for Momoko to remember their promise from long ago.

== Characters ==
Shinobu Handa (藩田思信)
Voiced by: Minami Hokuto
Shinobu is one of the main characters of the story. She has no trouble with money or making her way in the world and is popular with girls. She is a bourgeois-only child. She loves women regardless of age. In regards to frequently coming in late, sleeping in class, and generally being a delinquent, she is ahead of the curve and in the school's poetry club. However, it seems that she used to be a perfect student straight out of some movie. Although Shinobu is involved in a harem with most of her dorm mates, she is in love with Momoko Naitou the most.
Momoko Naitou (内藤桃子)
Voiced by: Kaname Yuzuki
The other main character of the series. Momoko is a member of the school's disciplinary committee which is a duty that she takes very seriously and often puts her at odds with Shinobu. She is very gluttonous (though she never seems to gain any weight), irritable, and has very little tolerance for other people's antics (though she is shown to have a mischievous side of her own). She is kind to her classmates, however, which makes her very popular. Momoko always wears a rather strong-smelling perfume which usually gives away her presence before she even makes it known. Several years prior to the start of the series, she first met Shinobu in a park when they both were very young. Shinobu gave her a cookie and Momoko in return gave her a kiss; afterwards, they were shown playing hide and seek together. This encounter left Shinobu with deep feelings of love for Momoko, though Momoko does not remember at all. Later in high school, Momoko finds it hard to warm up to the older Shinobu due to the latter's promiscuity, but after several events, reciprocates her feelings after realizing that Shinobu is genuinely kind and truly loves her.
Kirin Suwabe (諏訪部麒麟)
Voiced by: Ai Miyashita
Shinobu's best friend and one of the scholarship-funded orphans in the special dorm who is constantly seen in Shinobu's company. She fancies herself as Shinobu's servant which she says gives her a sense of self-worth. Kirin is very much in love with Shinobu despite her longtime feelings for Momoko, and even said that she would gladly share Shinobu as long as she could stay with her. She later ends up falling for another girl named Matsuri, who is deeply in love with her and who Kirin had sex with once in the manga and second episode of the anime.
Kyouko Hayato (隼砥教子)
Voiced by: Asuka Hōjō
A 27-year-old teacher of the high school division of Kagome School For Girls. She is tall and beautiful yet acts somewhat childish, which makes her popular among her students; in the past, she has dated several other young girls but after a while she remained single for a short time. Her favorite student is Momoko, with whom she is infatuated. She often hangs around with Momoko after school and allows her to stay at her place. She has a hard time with money, due to her expensive tastes but remains constantly upbeat. In the manga, after seducing Momoko in her apartment, she is afflicted with harsher symptoms of her illness and is forced to resign from school to recuperate, bringing an untimely end to their lovers' relationship. She later is mentioned in a bonus chapter time skip, in which she has traveled to Amsterdam to visit a hospitalized friend, and has sent Momoko a letter detailing her trip. It is unspecified what her illness(es), but in the manga Momoko mentions Kyouko's need of a donor. She lives in a high rise apartment and drives a RX-8.
Chizuru Komai (狛井千鶴)
Voiced by: Kaede Yamazaki
A classmate of Momoko, she is a very bold and stubborn girl who has trouble expressing herself. She does not compromise well with others and tends to be rather single-minded which makes her difficult to deal with. She is deeply in love with her older sister Shigure and tries desperately to make her see it. She goes to Momoko for advice and succeeds in mutually achieving her older sister's affections, which leaves Momoko shocked in learning that she assisted an "unnatural love." She is a member of the school's drama research club to which she is very dedicated and uses much of her allowance on.
Shigure Komai (狛井時雨)
Voiced by: Risa Matsuda
A third-year student and Chizuru's older sister. She is beautiful, intelligent, and serene with a good grip on things. She could easily be a class leader but chooses to go straight home after school instead. She is deeply in love with Chizuru but is much more subtle about her feelings and even tries to suppress them, though she eventually gives in after going to Shinobu for advice and realizing that both her and her sister's feelings are too strong to ignore.
Maya Enjoji (燕条寺 真弥)
Voiced by: Soyogi Tōno
One of the many girls in the school who is infatuated with Shinobu. Maya is a pretty smart girl, but she is also very submissive and weak-willed so she'll go along with about anything anyone tells her to do. One day when Maya was on clean-up duty, she found Shinobu sleeping in an empty room. Her infatuation got the better of her, she kissed Shinobu unaware that she was in the process of waking up. Shinobu later confronted her about it and Maya broke down and began apologizing, saying that she'll do anything to make it up to her. Shinobu brought Maya to an empty club room where she proceeded to seduce her. After some encouragement from Kirin, Maya pledged herself as Shinobu's servant, in return for being able to kiss her whenever she wants. Maya's devotion to Shinobu continues to grow and she is the only girl who ends up staying by her side pass their high school days, after which they form a three-way relationship between themselves and Momoko, who became Shinobu's lover. Shinobu helps Maya to break out of her shell and become more assertive, though she also becomes quite perverted in the process. The manga reveals that she suffers from low blood pressure, causing her to sleep in and take time for herself to wake up.
Sayuri Ookami (大神 小百合)
Voiced by: Elena Kaibara
A third-year student with a rebellious appearance-(especially when it comes to her clothes and school uniform) who longs to make Shinobu hers and hers alone. Ookami is the top of her class and is well respected by her teachers as well as most of her underclassmen for her model behavior but also proves to be a calculated schemer in her pursuit of Shinobu. She attempts to seduce Shinobu in an empty room but is repeatedly, yet, halfheartedly refused because Shinobu doesn't want to hurt another girl. Her true plan was to get Momoko to lose her temper and get herself expelled so that she would be separated from Shinobu. Her plan is realized when Momoko attacks her with a fire extinguisher; however, in the anime OVA, Sayuri punches her in the face resulting in Sayuri unknowingly knocking her head against a fire alarm leading to frantic uproar at the entire school. The matter is settled quietly out of court and Momoko is allowed to stay, but she chooses to leave for a different school anyway while Sayuri on the other hand is expelled from Kagome Academy due to her actions. Despite the fact that her plan ultimately succeeded, it proves to be in vain as Momoko and Shinobu consummate their feelings four months later. It is unknown what had happened to Sayuri after she got kicked out of school, but it's implied that she got sent to a new school.
Matsuri Yoshioka (吉岡 まつり)
Voiced by: Aki Nishihara
A girl with short orange hair who has a crush on Kirin whom with she has sex in the ova's second episode. She is of the few residents of the student dorms that does not attend the same school as the other girls. After Kirin graduates, Matsuri is able to remain in a relationship with Kirin.
Aki Kasagi (笠 置秋) and Nori Kasagi (笠 置紀)
(Aki & Nori) Voiced by: Ichigo Hinata
Identical twin sisters and students of Kagome Girls Academy who have been inseparable since birth and have grown closer to each other after learning about sex. They are both infatuated with Hatoko, an upperclassman with whom they are involved in a lesbian harem and a romantic/sexual relationship with. In order to hide away from their parents, they've moved into the school's dorms together where they could have a place of their own for themselves. Aki is more polite and laid back while Nori is more bolder and outgoing.
Hatoko Tsukudajima (佃嶋 鳩子)
Voiced by: Yuri Michikusa
An upperclassman student who is a member of a punk rock band. She is also a member of the light music club that has its members pay for its shockingly expensive music equipment. She is very friendly and caring but can also be a bit over-courteous. Hatoko cannot handle being spoiled herself and has trouble handling her fans; but her biggest fans/lovers Aki and Nori do not seem to be bothersome to her.
Akane Shinomiya (篠 宮茜)
Voiced by: Soyogi Tōno
One of Sayuri's accomplices and lover with whom she has a romantic and sexual relationship with. She was ordered by Sayuri into tricking Shinobu to see Momoko, but instead lured her into the math prep room where Sayuri was waiting for her and locked Shinobu from outside while Sayuri proceeded to rape her until Momoko intervened.

=== Other characters ===
These characters appear only in the manga:

Neo Asafuki (鳰 旦蕗)
Setsuka's classmate. She has feelings for Momoko beyond that of a "cute underclassman", but she can never make herself say it. Setsuka has bugged her about it, but when it comes to a quarrel, she puts up an even fight. Owing to Setsuka, she thinks of herself as someone who attracts other girls and is not proactive in working to improve herself. She has a pretty self-righteous personality, but is not all that strong-willed to enforce it. She continues to keep Setsuka at arm's length, but won't cut her loose.
Setsuka Inubosaki (犬吠埼 雪華)
She's Momoko's upperclassman, and lives in the same dorm. She has very particular mannerisms, and her head and mouth are always busy with her endless schemes. Even though she's aware of how Asafuki feels, she makes repeated, determined passes at her. However every time she does, she gets compared to Momoko, therefore she sees her as an enemy. She's short of stature, her hair is hard to style, her face doesn't have much charm, etc. The inferiority of her physical features compared to Momoko's causes her to feel compromised. However, she doesn't seem to mind that it is not ladylike that her pitching arm is good enough to hurl a chair one-handed.
Suu Sumi (鷲見 歌 須恵)
She has sociable and clever way of speaking and entices innocent underclassman into her evil clutches at the Pet Care Club's Captain. She's a third-year student. She's well known for only going after good-looking girls, and it is become a socially desired status to be scouted for the pet Club. However, if one does not know to step out from it, they'll be absorbed into the club as an obedient pet. Using the selection of beautiful to her advantage, every time she arranges an "introduction party" with all-boys school, she forces the bill onto the boys and then flees earning herself the title "Ripoff Queen" outside the school.
Yuhazu Tomoi (弓巾 朋永)
A weak-willed and unassertive transfer student who initially planned on joining the fashion club. Because she witnessed Sue playing with an underclassman, she herself eventually falls into Suu's hands. She was accepted into the popular Pet Club the very day she transferred, therefore some students hate her for that, but she doesn't know why. Tomoi generally thinks "I guess all transfer students get bullied unreasonably". She has many clothes and has spent much money on them. She puts her parents in a tight spot with her credit card bills. She's lower middle-class spendthrift.
Utano Yoshikiri (章切 詩乃)
A mute student who is afflicted with a curse that will cause her to disappear if she tries to speak; only communicating through gestures. Because of this, Chikae never leaves her side, acting like an interpreter and thus Chikae often gets on everyone's bad side. She feels indebted to Chikae because she now has a lower position. Unlike Chikae who is often too busy over Utano to care about her looks. Utano would often buy a bunch of fashion magazines and then secretly leave them open on Chikae's desk; Chikae would often misunderstand and think that Utano likes those types of clothes, and thus Utano would usually wear clothes that are rather unfitting for her.
Chikae Kai (甲斐 盟絵)
Utano's classmate and roommate. She thrives on only getting Utano things and making them available to her; therefore she forgets everything else, deals harshly with people around her, and pulls no punches when she talks, leaving her in endless quarrels. The only places that she and Utano are apart from each other are the restrooms and doctors/dentist offices.
Sonoko Mochida (持田 園子)
Kaori's childhood friend. Owing to her sincere looks and slightly slow mind, she often gets in disastrous situations and is easily bullied. Believing that her feeling for Kaori could be too much and needing to hide them from her, she left herself concerned a lot with how she looked. Appearing as she does, she is also quite popular with boys.
Kaori Yuze (湯瀬 花織)
Sonoko's childhood friend and one of Momoko's new classmates. She possesses a relatively good figure for her height but is barely grateful for it herself and wears glasses as well as putting on charmless triple plait; looking so plain that the boys hardly notice her. Her favorite dishes are canned roast chicken and Japanese herbal tea.

== Media ==
=== Manga ===
Shōjo Sect began as a manga series written and illustrated by Kenn Kurogane. The manga was serialized in the adult manga magazine Comic MegaStore from June 17, 2003, to June 17, 2005, and was later released as two bound volumes.

==== List of volumes ====
No.	Japanese release date	Japanese ISBN
1	18 August 2005	978-4-877348-82-3
2	19 April 2006	978-4-877349-79-0
3	14 November 2015	978-4-864368-50-6

=== OVA ===
A three-part OVA series titled Shōjo Sect: Innocent Lovers animated by Amarcord was announced in April 2008, with the first episode released on July 25, 2008.

==== OVA episodes ====
No.	Title	Original sale date
1	"First Period"; Transliteration: "1 Jigenme" (Japanese: 1 時限目)	July 25, 2008
Sixteen-year-old Shinobu Honda is known as the "player" in her school because of her sexual charisma with other female students. Sixteen-year-old Momoko Naitou is the one who tries to keep her so-called friend in line. Meanwhile, there are strange stories about the "Phantom Doll" spreading across the halls. The Komai sisters seek advice from both Shinobu and Momoko about what to do to about dealing with their growing relationship and end up having sex after Chizuru confesses her love to Shigure one night, half naked. After Maya, one of Shinobu's admirers, steals a kiss from her while she is sleeping, Shinobu punishes her by lustful teasing and submitting her with her seductive talents and the help of her best friend and lover Kirin. After that, Momoko realizes that both of the Komai sisters didn't arrive at class today. The next day, during swimming class, Chizuru shows her lover to Momoko on her cell phone. Later that day, Momoko is on closing duty. She sees Shinobu and accuses her of giving Shigure inappropriate advice up on the roof that morning which starts up an argument and an awkward moment between the two girls.
2	"Second Period"; Transliteration: "2 Jigenme" (Japanese: 2 時限目)	September 25, 2008
Kirin plays "doctor" for Matsuri, who had faked mumps in order to be with her. After making her statement on how grateful she is to be loved by many people, Shinobu tells Momoko she loves her. Feeling uneasy, Momoko leaves the apartment. She feels bored with her life and starts seeing her teacher, Hayato-sensei, and they end up having sex in a hotel room. The entire class soon gets wind of it and the girls completely ignore her. Meanwhile, Hayato-sensei collapses and is sent to a hospital. Hiding in a closet, Shinobu and Naitou hear from girls having a three-way about the teacher's illness and go see her. Hayato is no longer able to teach at the school and must leave. After parting with her lover/teacher on peaceful terms, Momoko goes outside to where Shinobu is waiting and thanks her for bringing her to the hospital.
3	"Third Period"; Transliteration: "3 Jigenme" (Japanese: 3 時限目)	November 25, 2008
Shinobu discovers that Maya is wearing the same type of lipstick that Momoko wears and subsequently takes her into the "reflection room" (a small, quiet room in the attic), leaving Kirin to come up with an excuse for their tardiness to school. That afternoon, Momoko is seen sitting in a restaurant with a mountain of hamburgers in front of her when Shinobu arrives to give her a gift for Valentine's Day: baked chocolates. Later, Shinobu is lured into a room alone with Sayuri. In order to keep Sayuri from exposing photographic proof of Momoko and Hayato-sensei's relationship, Shinobu is forced to strip naked and have sex with her. Momoko walks in on the two and rushes to Shinobu's aid, giving Sayuri time to escape. When she realizes what had happened, she charges at Sayuri and knocks her unconscious with a single punch. As a result of the ordeal, Sayuri is expelled and Momoko is forced to transfer schools; however, in truth she decided to switch schools at her own terms. In her frustration regarding the events, Shinobu runs to the park where she and Momoko first met and played at as children. The two are reunited and later have sex at a love hotel.
