= GN Software =

Japanese video game developer (2002–2010)

- Company type: Joint stock company
- Industry: Computer games
- Founded: 2003
- Headquarters: Japan
- Products: Visual novels

GN Software is a Japanese video game developer and publisher of consumer console games, mainly for the PlayStation 2. GN Software is under the parent company Good Navigate, which is also what GN stands for. From 2010 in advance, all their ports are released under the brand "Piacci".

== Games produced ==
=== As GN Software ===
2003

- Ren'ai CHU! Happy Perfect

2004

- Komorebi no Namikimichi: Utsurikawaru Kisetsu no Naka da
- Apocripha/0

2005

- Izumo Complete
- Angel's Feather -Kuro no Zanei-
- Like Life an hour

2006

- I/O
- Izumo 2: Mōki Tsurugi no Hirameki
- _Summer##

2007

- Majokko a la Mode II
- Castle Fantasia

2008

- Izumo 2
- Akaneiro ni Somaru Saka Parallel
- Suigetsu

2009

- Pia Carrot he Youkoso!! G.P -Gakuen Princess-
- Akaneiro ni Somaru Saka Portable
- MagusTale Eternity

=== As Piacci ===
2008

- Pia Carrot e Youkoso!! G.O. ~Summer Fair~
- Hoshiful ~Hoshi no Furu Machi~

2009

- Canvas 3 ~Hakugin no Portrait~
- Like Life Every Hour

2010

- Sakura Sakura -Haru Urara-
- Fairly Life Miracle Days
- White Breath Perfect Edition
- 77 (Sevens) ~beyond the Milky way~

2011

- Pia Carrot e Youkoso!! 4 ~Natsu no Koitatsu~
- Kuon no Kizuna Sairinshou -Portable-
- Suzukaze no Melt -days in the sanctuary-
- Suigetsu 2

2012

- SuGirly Wish
- Yaneura no Kanojo
