= Orange Pocket =

Japanese visual novel

- Orange Pocket DVDPG visual novel cover.

オレンジポケット (Orenji Poketto)
- Genre: Drama, Harem
- Video game
- Developer: Hooksoft
- Publisher: Hooksoft (Windows); Pionesoft (DC, PS2); Dennō Club (DVDPG); NTT DoCoMo (FOMA)
- Genre: Eroge, Visual novel
- Platform: Windows, Dreamcast, PlayStation 2, DVD TV game, FOMA
- Released: JP: June 13, 2003 (PC); JP: April 28, 2004 (DC, PS2); JP: July 14, 2005 (DVDPG); JP: August 4, 2006 (FOMA)
- Light novel
- Written by: Jōji Kamio
- Illustrated by: Hirokō Buda
- Published by: Softgarage
- Imprint: Sofgare novels
- Original run: October 20, 2003 – April 15, 2004
- Volumes: 3

Orange Pocket (オレンジポケット, Orenji Poketto) is an adult Japanese visual novel developed by Hooksoft which was released on June 13, 2003, for Windows as a CD. Subsequent enhanced ports to the Dreamcast as Orange Pocket: Cornet and to the PlayStation 2 as Orange Pocket: Root were released. Both ports feature their own exclusive characters and new scenarios not in the original Windows release. Limited editions of these versions were also released which contained a drama CD and a booklet with sketches and artwork of the girls in the game. The gameplay in Orange Pocket follows a plot line which offers pre-determined scenarios with courses of interaction, and focuses on the appeal of the female main characters. The story revolves around Hideaki Eda, who is enjoying a life in the country somewhere in Japan. His childhood friend moves from the city he used to live in to where he lives now and starts attending his school. She adapts to a rural life quickly and soon things start to become noisier as Hideaki begins to hang out with more girls from his school.

Other versions of the game followed, which were playable as a DVD TV game, and on FOMA mobile phones. The Windows version has been updated several times, ending with version 1.10 on September 29, 2006. Three light novels based on Orange Pocket were released between October 2003 and April 2004 written by Jōji Kamio.

== Gameplay ==
The gameplay requires little interaction from the player as most of the duration of the game is spent on simply reading the text that will appear on the screen; this text represents either dialogue between the various characters, or the inner thoughts of the protagonist. Every so often, the player will come to a "decision point" where he or she is given the chance to choose from options that are displayed on the screen, typically two to three at a time. During these times, gameplay pauses until a choice is made that furthers the plot in a specific direction, depending on which choice the player makes.

There are ten main plot lines that the player will have the chance to experience, one for each of the heroines in the story. Eight heroines are from the original game, and the last two come from the console versions, though both versions only get one of those two heroines; therefore, there are nine heroines in the Dreamcast and PlayStation 2 versions. In order to view the plot lines to their entirety, the player will have to replay the game multiple times and choose different choices during the decision points in order to further the plot in an alternate direction.

== Plot ==
Orange Pocket's story takes place in a rural area in Japan near a large mountain and river. The protagonist, Hideaki Eda, is attending East Tsukuda Academy (東津久田学園, Higashi Tsukuda Gakuen) and is experiencing an enjoyable life. One day, Hideaki's childhood friend Nazuna Ayase returns from the city and starts attending his school. She adapts to a rural life quickly and soon things start to become noisier as Hideaki begins to hang out with more girls from his school.

== Characters ==
=== Main characters ===
Hideaki Eda (江田 秀晃, Eda Hideaki)
Hideaki is the protagonist of the story, and is the person the player assumes. As a child, he lived in the city, which is where he met Nazuna Ayase. His parents were transferred due to their jobs, and he had to leave the city for a rural area. Soon after moving, he becomes close friends with Kazan, Madoka, Eru, and Sakino. After moving, Hideaki became very carefree due to his new friends and the laid-back nature of the town.

Nazuna Ayase (綾瀬 ナズナ, Ayase Nazuna)
Voiced by: Minami Hokuto
Nazuna is a childhood friend of Hideaki and at the beginning of the story transfers schools and comes to attend the same school as him. Her appearance, since she grew up in the city, gives her a contrast to those who grew up in the rural area where the story takes place, but she is very sociable and cheerful. After meeting Hideaki's circle of friends for the first time, she easily is able to blend in with them and gets along smoothly. She has excellent reflexes and always gets above-average grades in school.

Minori Nanao (七緒 美典, Nanao Minori)
Voiced by: Mia Naruse
Minori is in a grade below Hideaki, and is a close friend to Eru Kurosaki. She is very gentle and quiet, liking to do things at her own pace. She has the special skill to go to sleep anywhere, so she always carries around her favorite pillow. She often rests after school in the school library. Despite her small build, she has the largest breasts of any of the heroines in the game.

Madoka Omigawa (小見川 円, Omigawa Madoka)
Voiced by: Yui Moeki
Madoka is Hideaki's friend, and is one of his classmates. She has a bright, active personality, and is able to set the mood wherever she goes. She is an only child and is very well known around the area where she lives. She has good reflexes, but does not do very well in academic studies. While Madoka appears at ease on the outside, internally she has various insecurities and is unhappy. She is childhood friends with Sakino, and is very close with her.

Eru Kurosaki (黒崎 恵留, Kurosaki Eru)
Voiced by: Yukari Aoyama
Eru is in a grade below Hideaki, and acts like his younger sister. Whenever his parents are not home, Eru, who lives in the same neighborhood, comes over to perform domestic chores like cooking and cleaning. She has an obedient and generally quiet personality, but likes to joke with her friends. She is close friends with Minori Nanao, who is the same age as her.

Sakino Fujiki (藤木 咲乃, Fujiki Sakino)
Voiced by: Hina Makase
Sakino is Hideaki's friend, and another ones of his classmates. She is childhood friends with Madoka, and is very close with her. She has a serious personality, wears glasses, and constantly tries to get Madoka to settle down and do her work. Sakino dislikes physical exercise, unlike Madoka. She sometimes is a shy person, but is able to become more sociable, though still generally dislikes speaking to others. This gives her a gloomy appearance, but she is just constantly thinking about things.

Kiriko Kaminuma (神沼 桐子, Kaminuma Kiriko)
Voiced by: Hikaru Isshiki
Kiriko is one of Hideaki's classmates, though she does not appear in the beginning of the story. This is due to her liking to be alone and thus gives her a cool type of personality. She does have some friends at school, but she is basically alone most of the time. Kiriko enjoys photography, and often carries around her camera. Her grandfather owns a watch store which she lives above and works at as a part time job.

Haya Maebara (前原 羽弥, Maebara Haya)
Voiced by: Kana Fumizuki
Haya is an upperclassman at Hideaki's school. She has a short build which is in contrast to her otherwise strong personality, though she has been known to act timidly at times. She is actually very lonely, and she acts childishly. Haya is a typical tsundere character.

Yūki Ayase (綾瀬 ユーキ, Ayase Yūki)
Voiced by: Ayane Mikimoto
Yūki is a younger girl living next door to Hideaki. She often refers to Hideaki as Onii-chan (おにーちゃん; meaning "older brother").

Arika Minamoto (源 ありか, Minamoto Arika)
Voiced by: Kohiro Fukumoto
Arika is another upperclassman at Hideaki's school. She is a close friend of Haya's, and is a serious, level-headed type of person. Arika looks after both Haya and Hideaki as an older-sister would. She hides the fact that she plays the guitar, likes to sing songs as she plays, and wants to become a professional musician. She was a minor character in the original game, but was given a scenario in the PlayStation 2 version.

Korune Kawanami (川波 ころね, Kawanami Korune)
Voiced by: Mao Enokizu
Korune is in a grade below Hideaki. Her parents own a bakery in town. She generally has a cheerful personality, though when around men she will act like she is in a hurry and will attempt to run away quickly. She only makes an appearance in the Dreamcast version of the game.

=== Supporting characters ===
Kazan Okumura (奥村 華山, Okumura Kazan)
Voiced by: Tsukasa Madera
Kazan is Hideaki's best male friend. He comes from an old family, and is an only child. He has an honest and diligent personality and will always show courtesy to others. He had respect for his grandfather while he was still alive; he was a martial arts master. His grandfather had taught him this skill, which gave him a roughneck label at one point. After Hideaki initially moved, Kazan and he were at odds with each other, but gradually they became good friends. Hiiragi Tachibana is his fiancé, and he loves her dearly.

Hiiragi Tachibana (立花 柊, Tachibana Hiiragi)
Voiced by: Ayane Mimotoki
Hiiragi is one of Hideaki's friends, and is Kazan's future wife-to-be. Like Kazan, she too comes from an old family and has adopted an older way of thinking about the world. She takes great pride that she is Kazan's fiancé, and does not hesitate to profess this fact. She is generally gentle and quiet, but she too has learned the same martial arts style as Kazan, and it is hinted at that she is better than he is at the art.

Tomika Utsugi (空木 朋佳, Utsugi Tomika)
Voiced by: Satomi Kodama
Tomika is a young teacher at the school Hideaki attends, and is his homeroom teacher. She has a bright personality and will always help her students with problems. She is popular with the students, who will often refer to her as "Tomika-chan" as a term of endearment.

Shōzan Okumura (奥村 松山, Okumura Shōzan)
Shōzan was Kazan's late grandfather. He was the head of Kazan's family, and was a martial arts master, along with being intellectual. He had a great influence on Kazan's character as he grew up. In his last years of life, he wrote a novel under the pen name Sakado Okamura (奥村佐門, Okamura Sakado).

== Development ==
=== Release history ===
Orange Pocket was first introduced in Japan on June 13, 2003, as a CD-ROM playable on a Microsoft Windows PC. Two consumer console versions for the Dreamcast (DC) and PlayStation 2 (PS2) with adult content removed were developed by Pionesoft and released on April 28, 2004, in limited and regular edition versions. The DC version was called Orange Pocket: Cornet, and the PS2 version was called Orange Pocket: Root. The limited edition versions for Cornet and Root came bundled with an original drama CD and an artbook corresponding to either version. A version playable as a DVD TV game titled Orange Pocket DVDPG was released on July 14, 2005. A portable version, playable on FOMA cellular phones, was produced by NTT DoCoMo on August 4, 2006. Various patches were released as free downloads to update the original game ranging between version 1.02 to version 1.07. The final version, 1.10, was released on September 29, 2006.

== Related media ==
Novel volume 1.

=== Light novels ===
There have been three adult character light novels based on the game written by Jōji Kamio and illustrated by Hirokō Buda, published by Softgarage under their Sofgare novels imprint. The first novel covers Eru, the second covers Nazuna, and the third is a general novel entitled Omnibus. The first novel was released on October 20, 2003, followed by the second on January 15, 2004, and finally the third on April 15, 2004.

=== Music and audio CDs ===
Orange Pocket's opening theme is "OrangePocket", and the ending theme is "Haruoto" (はるおと), both by Maki Yuzuki. The game's original soundtrack, titled Sound Pocket, was released by Lantis on October 22, 2003 and contained 29 tracks. Another album called Orange Pocket Arrange & Drama was released on January 21, 2004, as a two-disc set: disc one contained 18 arrange versions of background music from the game's original soundtrack, and disk two contained seven drama tracks.
