= Ryōko Tanaka =

Japanese voice actress from Tokyo (born 1973)

- 田中 涼子
- Born: July 28, 1973 (age 52); Tokyo, Japan
- Occupation: Voice actress
- Years active: 1997–present

Ryōko Tanaka (田中 涼子, Tanaka Ryōko; born July 28, 1973) is a Japanese voice actress from Tokyo.

== Career ==
Tanaka was born in Tokyo. She used to belong to the Arts Vision, Office Mori and Pro-Fit talent agency. She is currently free. She is a native of Japan Narration Acting Institute. She has a good relationship with Harumi Sakurai in the trade. She is known for the alias as Hikaru Isshiki (Japanese: 一色 ヒカル).

== Filmography ==
=== Anime ===
- _Summer as Kasumi Suda
- 3000 Leagues in Search of Mother
- Agent Aika as Blue B; White Delmo S
- Battle Athletes Victory
- Chūka Ichiban
- Coji-Coji
- DT Eightron
- Ga-Rei: Zero as Mei Isayama
- Gift as Ibuki Yajima
- H_{2}O: Footprints in the Sand as Hinata Kagura
- Himitsu no Akko-chan
- Kaginado as Yuiko Kurugaya
- Kakyūsei 2 as Hiroku Hirasawa
- Kodomo no Jikan as Kyōko Hōin
- Little Busters! as Yuiko Kurugaya
- Lost Universe
- Rewrite as Touka Nishikujou
- Sakura Diaries
- Shuffle! as Tsubomi
- School Days as Hikari Kuroda
- The Fruit of Grisaia as Yumiko Sakaki
- The Share House's Secret Rule as Kanade Ayase

=== Video games ===
- Aoi Namida
- Ayakashibito as Touko Ichinotani
- Crescendo as Ayame Sasaki
- I/O as Sakuya Kawahara
- Iinazuke
- Little Busters! as Yuiko Kurugaya
- Really? Really!
- Rewrite as Touka Nishikujou
- Shuffle! on the Stage as Nadeshiko Benibara
- Tokyo Babel as Messenger
- Tomoyo After: It's a Wonderful Life as Tomoyo Sakagami
- Eiyuu Senki as Abe no Seimei, Hercules

==== As Hikaru Isshiki ====
2003

- Clover Heart's as Hakuto Nagumo
- Orange Pocket as Kiriko Kaminuma

2004

- Mama Love as Kaori Akizuki
- Majipuri -Wonder Cradle- as Sora Kitajima
- Forest as Kaoru Mayuzumi
- Dear My Friend as Saeka Nagamura
- Hitomi -My Stepsister- as Hitomi Maejima

2005

- Yume Miru Kusuri as Mizuki Kirimiya
- Yunohana as Tsubaki Takao
- Tomoyo After: It's a Wonderful Life as Tomoyo
- School Days as Hikari Kuroda
- Otome wa Boku ni Koishiteru as Hisako Kajiura and Kei Takanashi
- _summer as Kasumi Suda and Chizuru Tachibana
- Anejiru The Animation as Ryoko Shirakawa
- Ayakashibito as Tōko Ichinotani
- Ayakashi as Akino Yoake
- Yatohime Zankikou as Tou Kusanagi

2006

- Really? Really! as Tsubomi
- Tsumashibori as Sakura Aoi
- Summer Days as Hikari Kuroda
- Aruto as Saori Tachibana
- Boy Meets Girl as Miu Tsubasa
- BOIN ni kakero! as Kei Inamori

2007

- AneImo 2 ~Second Stage~ as Saori Shirakawa
- Sekai de ichiban NG na Koi as Asami Kouno
- R.U.R.U.R. as R-Benibana

2008

- Sumaga as Arided and Ari Kawashima
- Yosuga no Sora as Yahiro Ifukube

2009

- Coμ -Kuroi Ryuu to Yasashii Oukoku- as Kagome Hinaori

2011

- Grisaia no Kajitsu as Yumiko Sakaki
- Maji de Watashi ni Koi Shinasai! S as Seiso Hazakura

=== Drama CDs ===
- Hanayome wa Kaihatsu Shitsucho as Sana Takashiro
