= Megu Ashiro =

Japanese voice actress

- 亜城めぐ
- Born: August 10, 1978 (age 48)
- Other name: Megumi Kobayashi (小林恵美)
- Occupation: voice actress
- Employer: TAB Production

Megu Ashiro (亜城めぐ, Ashiro Megu; born August 10, 1978), also known under the name Megumi Kobayashi (小林恵美, Kobayashi Megumi), is a Japanese voice actress from Yamagata, Japan. Previously affiliated with TAB Production, the Gekidan Jūshin theater troupe, and Air Agency.

== Filmography ==
=== Anime ===
- _summer
- BASToF Lemon
- Canvas 2 ~Niji Iro no Sketch~
- Great Teacher Onizuka
- Jigoku Shōjo
- Mahoromatic
- Monster
- Otogi-Jūshi Akazukin
- Red Garden
- Samurai Shodown
- School Days (anime) as Kokoro Katsura
- Seven of Seven
- Shadow Star
- Sgt. Frog
- This Ugly Yet Beautiful World

=== Games ===
- Nadia: The Secret of Blue Water
- One: Kagayaku Kisetsu e
- Raw Danger
