= Yuki Kiriga =

Japanese manga author

- Born: May 14
- Area: Manga

Yuki Kiriga (霧賀ユキ, Kiriga Yuki; born May 14) is a Japanese manga author. She is known for creating characters with cute appearances, and even provided chibi illustrations for characters in Sister Princess and Strawberry Panic! in the Japanese bishōjo magazine Dengeki G's Magazine.

== Works ==
- Boku × Neko?
- Di Gi ★ A La Mode
- Di Gi Charat Theater: Dejiko's Adventure (English: September 2004)
- HaniComi The 4-panel
- Tenshi no Hane to Akuma no Shippo
