= Jōji Kamio =

Japanese writer

Jōji Kamio (神尾 丈治, Kamio Jōji) is a male Japanese author who has written many erotic novels based from adult Japanese visual novels. He has been writing such novels since 2001. He has notably written novels for the past four visual novels by Hooksoft: Orange Pocket, Like Life, _Summer, and HoneyComing.

== Works ==
- _Summer
- HoneyComing
- Like Life
- Lost Passage
- Orange Pocket
- Soul Link
- Triangle Heart 3
