= Hitomi (voice actress) =

Japanese voice actress

- ひと美
- Born: February 15, 1967 (age 58); Osaka, Japan

Hitomi (ひと美, born February 15, 1967) is a Japanese voice actress from Osaka Prefecture, Japan. She has also done voice work, especially in eroge, under the name Minami Hokuto (北都 南, Hokuto Minami). She is married to fellow voice actor Kazuya Ichijō.

== Adult Roles ==
=== Eroge ===
1998

- Kyouhaku (Reika Takatsukasa)
- Magical Kanon (Sayaka Mizuki)

1999

- Little My Maid (Hina)
- Ingoku no Gakuen Biseito Choukyou (Rena Anemiya)
- Rensa ~Uragiri no Kusari~ (Moeki Ito)

2000

- Rasen Kairou (Aoi Mizuyo)
- Shiyouzumi ~Condom~ (Shiori Kusanagi)
- Shin Ruriiro No Yuki ~Furimukeba Tonari ni~ (Yurino Shinozaki)
- Sumire (Keiko Fujieda)
- Teito no Yuri (Saori Kojima)
- Dennou M Dorei - Reimi (Reimi Kazato)
- Lens no Mukougawa... (Yoriko Takaoka)
- Ry?jokuki (Miki Matsubara)
- ~Miboujin~ Niku Dorei (Yuki Takazawa)
- Triangle Heart 3 ~Sweet Songs Forever~ (Nanoha Takamachi)
- Dorei Ichiba (Cecilia)
- Castle Fantasia ~Seima Taisen~ (Renard Theron)

2001

- Gibo (Mio Shinohara)
- Flutter of Birds ~Tori-tachi no Hane Bataki~ (???)
- Tsubaki-iro no Prigione (Mari Yanase)
- Aozameta Tsuki no Hikari (Alice)
- Dokusen (Yukino Kotoriasobu)
- Ryoujoku Kangofu Gakuin (Etsuki Kawai)
- Kimi ga Nozomu Eien (Fumio Hoshino)
- W/B (Epinera Angelica)
- Itsuka no Sora (Futaba Yuzaki)
- Ingoku Byoutou ~Himerareta Wana~ (Ikumi Hayakawa)
- Midarana Tsumi ~Etsuraku no Hinemosu~ (Rei Bito)
- Dorei Ichiba Renaissance (Cecilia)
- Archimedes no Wasuremono (Sakura Yoshino)
- Sacrifice ~Seifuku Gari~ (Niumi Mizukoshi)

2002

- Mei☆Puru (Rino Morisaki)
- Yadokari Typhoon! (Mina)
- Sky (Ran Irie)
- Deep 2 (Mutsumi Nomura)
- Maid Hunter Zero One ~Nora Maid~ (Sayo)
- Mahou Senshi Sweet Knights ~Heroine Ryoujoku Shirei~ (Sweet Kiss)
- Nankin (???)
- Floralia (Ofumi Kaga)
- D.C. Da Capo (Sakura Yoshino)
- Psychicer Mimi (Bibi Koenji)
- Onna Kyoushi -Nikutai Jugyou- (Misaki Nagasawa)
- Sakura Kikou ~Dorei Choukyou~ (Mayumi Hayase)
- Unicchi! ~Weenie Witches~ (Daniela Hawkeye)
- Jewel Matrix (Annette)
- Kegareta Eiyuu ~Jain Seijo Gari~ (Yukari Mutsuki)
- Kinoko ~Kindan no Chiryouyaku~ (Kinoko)
- Hachimitsu Sou de Hoppe ni Chuu (Yumi Igarashi)
- Princess Holiday ~Korogaru Ringotei Senya Ichiya~ (Rachel Harvest)
- Shuuchuu Chiryoushitsu (Nanami Mizuno)
- Ingoku Byoutou 2 ~Karamiau Wana~ (Ikumi Hayakawa)
- Aniyome (Miyuki Suehiro, Miwa Kagura)
- Sensei Da-isuki (Yui Saionji)
- D.C. ~Da Capo~ Seasons (Sakura Yoshino)
- Imouto Jiru (Miu Kohinata)
- Ikenai Oshigoto (Reiho Ijima)
- Platinum Wind ~Hoshi no Uta ga Kikoetara~ (Rita)
- Moldavite (Annette Valois)
- Kazoku Keikaku (Aoba Takayashiki)

2003

- Fukuramikake (Mia Akiba)
- Tokidoki Sugar (Emi Kirishima)
- Gibo Shimai (Natsuki Akashi, Kana Kimura)
- Usamimi Deliveries!! (Beruno Kutsuki)
- Muv-Luv (Miki Tamase)
- Motto! Himitsu Taiken (Kazuko Nakajima)
- Marionette ~Ito Tsukai~ (Aoi Hojo)
- Boku no Natsu Asobi (Chika Mizusawa)
- Fukushuu no Megami -Nemesis- (Megumi Ogiwara, Yuzu Ogiwara)
- One 2 ~Eien no Yakusoku~ (Kuon Asou)
- Hiyoko no Kimochi (Ruria Shipp?)
- Tounosawa Majutsu Kenkyuukai (Sayuri Katsuki)
- Natsu Shoujo (Ayamizu Azuma)
- Eclipse -Zettai Reido Keikaku Soushitsu Shoujo- (Luserina Ariass)
- Candy Toys (Lenny Fujishima Goleman)
- Orange Pocket (Nazuna Ayase)
- Nee, Chanto Shiyou Yo! (Yome Hiragi)
- Komorebi ni Yureru Tamashii no Koe (Ayana Koenji)
- Monograph ~Tooi Yakusoku~ (Mamoru Goho)
- Izayoi no Hanayome (Tamaki Kurasawa)
- Maid Youbi wa H ga Ippai (Yuna)
- Thunder Claps! (Makoto Yaegaki)
- Negai no Mahou. (Mutsumi Takase)
- Dokidoki Onee-san (Reiko Miura)
- Crescendo ~Eien Dato Omotte Ita Ano Koro~ (Kaori Shito)
- Maple Colors (Mirai Aoi)
- Chikansha Thomas (Anna Chris Ford)
- Salem no Majo-tachi (Sakoeri, Julia Vuirado)
- Shin Aniyome (Miyuki Suehiro, Miwa Kagura)
- Punitsuma ~Oku-san wa Anatairo~ (Aya Sakuramiya)
- Kattobi! (Aoihi Jinba)
- Shiki to Hitsuji to Warau Tsuki ~Cry for the Moon~ (Keirai, Myojo Ichinose)
- Sacred Plume (Horyi)
- Hime Ichiya (Kanoe)
- Giin Oyako Celeb ~Kegareyuku Soukyuu no Bara~ (???)
- Zaishuu -The SiN- (Harumi Shin)
- Futarijime ~Osananajimi to Natsu to Gimai~ (Chinatsu Momoi)
- Ricotte ~Alpenbul no Utahime~ (Von Tina Bonifattsu)
- Tsuki wa Higashi ni Hi wa Nishi ni ~Operation Sanctuary~ (Eri Shibukaki, Chihiro Tachibana)
- Hoshizora Planet (Tenshi Ninomiya)
- Innyuu Joshikousei Ryoujoku Shidou Youryou (Chika Suzutsuki)
- Fukuramikake 2 ~Bra Kaemashita~ (Mia Akiba)
- Sister Contrast! (Suzume Umino)
- Presence (Nanaoto Amagi)
- Imouto Watashi Donna Koto Datte... (Mirin Nonohara)
- Kizumono no Shoujo -Kizumono no Gakuen Gaiden- (Seion Yoshikawa)
- Kanaete Ageru ~Fuyu ga Kureta Okurimono~ (Meya)
- Daibanchou -Big Bang Age-
- Soko ni Umi ga Atte... (Natsumi Kaibara)

2004

- Komokyun!! ~Heart ni Yureru Tamashi no Fandisc~ (Ayana Koenji)
- Maple Colors H (Mirai Aoi)
- Hitomi - My Stepsister (Yuki Yanagimoto)
- Imouto ~Sweet & Bitter~ (Miku Suzuki)
- Forest (Black Alice)
- Floralia + ~floralia plus~ (Ofumi Kaga)
- OL Shimai (Reika Fujino)
- Cradle Song ~Kinou ni Kanaderu Ashita no Uta~ (Serenia Rasumun)
- Ai Cute! Kimi ni Koishiteru (Choko)
- Shuffle! (Primula)
- Mahokoi ~Ecchi na Mahou de Koi x Koi Shichau~ (Chocolat Des Cappuccino)
- Angel Maid (Ayame Sakuraba)
- Love Fetish ~Tekoki Hen~ (Chisato Kusanagi)
- Mahou Senshi Sweet Knights 2 ~Metzer Hanran~ (Kanaha Yuzaki)
- Mejoku ~Fukushuu Gakuen~ (Kaori Aizaki)
- Love Fetish ~Paizuri Hen~ (Chisato Kusanagi)
- Maiden Breeder 2 (Miriru)
- Ui-chan no Niizuma Diary~ (Kazu Shirase)
- D.C.P.C. ~Da Capo Plus Communication~ (Mitsu-kun, Sakura Yoshino)
- Shamana Shamana ~Tsuki to Kokoro to Taiyou no Mahou~ (Patricia Hugh)
- Angel Wish ~Houkago no Meshitsukai ni Chuu~ (Nanami Kidosaki)
- Kuro Ai ~Ichiya Saikan Inkou Rannyuuroku~ (Honoka Houjou)
- Miko-san Hosoude Hanjouki (Narumi Osato)
- Nee, Chanto Shiyou Yo! 2 (Yome Hiragi)
- Doko e Iku no, Ano Hi (Kazuha Motegi)
- Hinatabokko (Suzuno Kisaragi)
- Sakura Machizaka Stories Vol. 1 (Shino Koumura, Riina Nitta, Mishou Hotaka)
- Kazoku Keikaku ~Soshite Mata Kazoku Keikaku wo~ (Aoba Takayashiki)
- D.C. ~Da Capo~ Seasons (Sakura Yoshino, Mitsu-kun)
- Ringetsu (Ayumi Hitsuki)
- Puni Puni Handmaid (Tonbo)
- Friends ~Child Flower~ (Yuki)
- August Fan Box (Chihiro Tachibana, Eri Shibukaku, Rachel)
- Love Fetish ~Sanshamendan Hen~ (Chisato Kusanagi)
- Suigetsu (Suzuran Yamato)
- Yin-Yang! X-Change Alternative (Miu Kotosaka)
- Tsuma x Tsuma 4 ~Koko wa Hitozuma Fitness~ (Ai Narushima)
- Ane to Boin (Ringo Hanamaru, Anne Hanamaru)
- Konneko (Namami Minamino)
- Kana: Imouto (Miki Kondo)
- Magical Tale (Fafa)
- Yoimachi Hime ~Taishou Inwai Kyuuketsu Kitan~ (Elle)
- Miko Mai ~Tada Hitotsu no Negai~ (Hisana Kazami)
- Miko-san Hosoude Hanjouki Extra (Narumi Osato)
- Tetsuwan Gacchu! (Mina, Nami)
- Eigou Kaiki (Yun Hizaki)
- Peace@Pieces (Kyoko Hanazawa, Mika)

2005

- Answer Dead (Bibi Kisaragi, Michie Touno)
- Cafe-Aqua (Arisa Tomonaga)
- Yureru Bus Guide ~Oppai ga Ippai~ (Mai Tachibana)
- Kurokami Shoujotai (Miyabi Nakamikado, Kagura)
- Dyogrammaton (Ukiko Kagura)
- Futago Hinyuu x 3 (Stella, Alyssum)
- Samurai Jupiter (Lulu Shinonome)
- Hinatarte ~Hinatabokko Fandisc~ (Suzuni Kisaragi)
- Makai Tenshi Djibril -Episode 2- (Akira Kanno)
- Cartagra ~Tsuki kurui no Yamai~ (Otowa, Koyuki)
- Love Fetish ~Maso Hen~ (Chisato Kusanagi)
- Love Death ~Realtime Lovers~ (Nanami Katsuki)
- Kyouhaku 2 ~Kizu ni Saku Hana Senketsu no Beni~ (Saki Akirahime)
- Tonarizuma (Ryoko Kozu)
- Tousui Kitan (Kiriha Hidea)
- Kourin Tenshi En Ciel Rena (Akito Hayamizu)
- Princess Witches (Karen Kasuga)
- Pastel Chime Continue (Stork S. Farnese)
- Diorama (Moe Futami)
- D-spray Biyaku de Motemote Kachou Dairi Hosa (Sayaka Tsurumi)
- Caramel Box Yarukibako (Hitomi Mizushima)
- Supacchu! ~Ikaga ni Watashi ga Hakimono wo Aisuru you ni natta no ka~ (Tokiko Kurosu)
- Yagai Gakushuu (Akane Kamizumi)
- Futari no Aniyome (Sayumi Fujimi)
- Swan Song (Taeko Nogi)
- Tsuyokiss (Erika Kiriyoru)
- Chotto Sunao ni Donburi Kanjou (Tamami Kamishiro)
- Tsui Tsui ~Twintail Twins~ (Mike Himesugi)
- Honoo no Haramase Tenkousei (Sayaka Minase, Wakana Misaki, Rinatsu Nagai)
- Ayakashi (Orie Natsuhara)
- Dancing Crazies (Himeko Inasera)
- Happiness! (Suzuri Onagi)
- Tutorial Summer (Yuzu Seto)
- Bin★Can Darling (Naho Hidaka)
- Ryouki 2 ~Ayashiku Ugomeku Inbou no Enbukyoku~ (Martina, Meteor)
- Terrible Future (Tsukioto Fujiwara)
- Nazunagasuki Nazuna to Wakana no Monogatari (Elle)
- Pascha C++ (Stork S Farnese
- Galzoo Island (Kappa's, Chinese Tenten)
- Yatohime Zankikou (Hokuto)
- Gibo to Oba ~Soshite Yuujin no Haha~ (???)
- Debo no Subako (Shiruera Purisuna)
- Tonarizuma Mini Fandisk Featuring Hayakawa Hiromi Kouzu Ryouko (Ryoko Kozo)

2006

- Gore Screaming Show (Himego Yumegawa)
- White x Red (Asuka Sumeragi)
- Yumekumi! ~Wake Ari Bukken, Yousei Tsuki~ (Miu)
- Harukoi Otome ~Otome no Sono de Gokigenyou~ (Chie Ōgami, Mai Kiryū)
- Himemiko (Magyo Tsurugi)
- Muv-Luv Alternative (Miki Tamase)
- Gakuto! (Mary Nishida)
- Setsuei (Shiko Suzuma)
- Hokenshitsu ~Magical Pure Lesson~ (Komomo Ryūgasaki)
- Kono Aozora ni Yakusoku o (Shizu Fujimura)
- Junren (Tsukino Asakura)
- Kamisama no Yado! (Wakana Fujimiya)
- Bleed Blood (Mora)
- Yokubari Saboten (Akina Natsume)
- Fukou na Kami (Mishiro-sama)
- Tsuma to Mama to Boin (Kanemi Yotsuba)
- Tenshitsuki no Shoujo (Maria Uragami)
- Mahou ga Sekai wo Sukuimasu! (Angela)
- D.C. II ~Da Capo II~ (Sakura Yoshino)
- Tsuma Tsuma ADV ~Hitozuma Onsen Hanjouki~ (Ai Tachibana, Midori Yamazaki)
- Koi iro Chu! Lips (Misaki Kasuga)
- Natsuiro Kouen ~Denpatou no Shita de Ai wo Kataru~ (Kyouka Shinozaki)
- Happiness! Re:Lucks (Suzuri Onagi)
- Koi Otome (Ruri Yamato)
- A.C.D.C. Rumbling Angel (Sakura Yoshino)
- My Tsuma (Mana Aio)
- Kikaijikake no Eve -Dea Ex Machina- (Touko Hirano)
- Ayakashi H (Orie Natsuhara)
- Otaku ☆ Masshigura (Akira Kageyama)
- Mehime no Toriko ~Haikousha no Seifuku Shoujo~ (Yuzuru Touya)
- Tori x Tori ~Ecchi Shitekunnakya Itazura Shichauzo?~ (Beryuaru Asumodeu)
- Colorful Aquarium (Saria)
- Really? Really! (Kouyou Fuyou, Primula)
- Haruka ni Aogi, Uruwashi no (Miyabi Kazamatsuri)
- Minikiss ~Tsuyokiss Fan Disc~ (Youme Hiragi, Erika Kiritani)
- Sentinel (Kuon Tokizami)
- Fossette ~Cafe au Le Ciel Bleu~ (Shizu Fujimura)

2007

- Alea Akaki Tsuki o Haruka ni Nozomi (Ami Kamishiro)
- Koihime † Musou ~Doki Otome Darake no Sangokushi Engi~ (Sonshouka)
- Itsuka, Todoku, Ano Sora ni. (Yadokasa Ashita)
- Oshiete! Onetei (Touko Morioka)
- Haitoku no Gakuen 2 ~Yami o Tsugu Mono~ (Dominic)
- Utsurigi Nanakoi Tenkiame (Fumiko Houami)
- Mashiro Botan (Mashiro Miyazono)
- Mahou Senshi Symphonic Knights ~Megami o Tsugu Otome-tachi~ (Kanaha Yuzuki/Sweet Kiss)
- Figurehead (Twins)
- D.C. II ~Da Capo II~ Spring Celebration (Yoshino Sakura, Suzume Isowashi)
- Amesarasa ~Ame to, Fushigi na Kimi ni, Koi wo suru~ (???)
- Touka Gettan (Nene Midou)
- Kimi ga Aruji de Shitsuji ga Ore de (Mihato Uesugi)
- Honey Coming (Minato Shimoyanagi)
- Ouzoku (Stella, Voice System, Narrator, Voice of mystery)
- Koisuru Otome to Shugo no Tate - The Code Name is "Shield 9" (Marina Shinjou)
- Majiyome ~Majin-kun no Hanayome~ (???)
- Gun-Katana - Non-Human-Killer (Haruka Rokuro, Miyo Mukai)
- Ne-pon? x Raipon! (Marron)
- Sweet! (Hiyori Tenfuka)
- Shin Ringetsu (Ayumi Hitsuki)
- Eternal Fantasy (Prill)
- Magus Tale ~Sekaiju to Koisuru Mahoutsukai~ (Mylene Service)
- Ashita no Kimi to Au Tame ni (Rin)
- Fair Child (Nanaru Saionji)
- Otome Chibaku Yuugi ~Disgrace Return Play~ (Nanao Miasasaka)

2008

- D.C.P.K. ~Da CaPoker~ (Sakura Yoshino)
- Nostradamus ni Kiite Miro (Nami Akiba)
- Choukou Sennin Haruka (Mitsuki, Saginomiya)
- Ikusa Otome Valkyrie 2 (Freya)
- Sacred Ground (Stella Ikushita, Sweet Kiss, Succubus)
- Haruiro Communication (Erika Kiriyoru)
- G-senjou no Maou (Yuki Tokita)
- Furufuru Full Moon (???)
- MagusTale Infinity (Mylene Service)
- Konboku Mahjong ~Konna Mahjong ga Attara Boku wa Ron!~ (Saki Shimoyanagi)
- Magica Ride (Andante)
- Hime nochi Honey (Nanami)
- Ashita no Nanami to Au Tame ni ~Ashita no Kimi to Au Tame ni~ Fandisc (Rin)
- Shin Koihime † Musou ~Otome Ryouran Sangokushi Engi~ (Shoshoka)

2009

- Seiken no Fairies (Rio Hitsugi)
- Anettai Chuuihou!? (???)
- D.C. II ~Da Capo II~ To You - Side Episodes (Sakura Yoshino, Suzume Isowashi)
- Kagura Douchuuki (Nazuna Raido)
- 77(Sevens) ~And, two stars meet again~ (Kotone Fujikado)
- Maji de Watashi ni Koishinasai! (Koyuki Sakakibara)
- Soukou Akki Muramasa (Muramasa Nisei, Ritsu Kazama, Funa)
- Shuffle! Essence+ (Primula)
- Kiss to Maou to Darjeeling (Terashinbou Sanjo)
- Atori no Sora to Shinchuu no Tsuki (Asa Kirikage)
- D.C.II Fall in Love (Sakura Yoshino)
- 15 Bishoujo Hyouryuuki (Nanashi)

2010

- Kagura Gakuen Ki (Nazuna Raido)
- Unival! Paranormal Girls Strike!! (Megu Watase)
- Sugar Coat Freaks (Jill Gransyrto Ruritania)
- Narikiri Bakappuru! (Hiwa Gokutsunesama)
- Areas ~Koi Suru Otome no 3H~ (Mizuki Otawa)
- Subarashiki Hibi ~Furenzoku Sonzai~ (Kimika Tachibana)
- Shin Koihime † Musou ~Moeshouden~ (Sonshoka)
- Akatsuki no Goei ~Tsumibukaki Shuumatsuron~ (Kanako)
- Kotori Love Ex P (Sakura Yoshino, Kanako Saeki)
- Noblesse Oblige (Yukari Hiiragi)
- Neko Koi! ~Nekogami-sama to Nekomimi no Tatari~ (Gosenzo-zama)
- Acchi Muite Koi (Runa Narumi)
- Evolimit (Lidia von Erhart)
- Comsome! ~Combination Somebody~ (Rin Gokago)
- Motto Nee, Chanto Shiyou yo! (Shizuka Oribe, Koma)
- Suzukaze no Melt -Where wishes are drawn to each other- (Mina Hiiragi)
- Ren'ai Saimin ~Tsun na Kanojo ga dereru Saimin~ (Fuuka Kudoriya)
- Jinki Extend Re:Vision (Rui Kousaka)
- D.C. Dream X'mas ~Da Capo~ Dream Christmas (Sakura Yoshino, Kanako Saeki)
- Tiny Dungeon ~Bless of Dragon~ (Uluru Kajuta)
- Ore no Tsure wa Hito de nashi (Io Itsumi)

2011

- Gokudou no Hanayome (Sarasa Suoin)
- Damatte Watashi no Muko ni Nare! (???)
- Bloody Rondo (Francisca Poirot)
- Tsuyokiss 3gakki (Erika Kiriyoru)
- Secret Game Code:Revise (Hitomi Kasuya)
- Shuffle! Love Rainbow (Primula)
- Kagura Soushunfu (Nazuna Raido)
- Stellar Theater Encore (Mashiro Nanairo)
- Motto Nee, Chanto Shiyou yo! Afterstory (Shizuka Oribe, Koma)
- Maikaze no Melt -Where leads to feeling destination- (Mina Hiiragi)
- Tiny Dungeon ~Birth for Yours~ (Uluru Kajuta)
- Lunaris Filia ~Kiss to Keiyaku to Shinku no Hitomi~ (Tamako Hinohara)
- Hanachiru Miyako to Ryuu no Miko (Shina)
- Appare! Tenka Gomen (Yukina Yui)

2012

- Maji de Watashi ni Koishinasai! S (Koyuki Sakakibara)
- Dousei Lover Able (Satuki Yanase)
- Eiyuu Senki (Magoko, Gawain)
- Appare! Tenka Gomen Matsuri ~Koi to Arashi wa Ooedo no Hana~ (Yukina Yui)

2013

- Komorebi no Nostalgica (???)

=== OVA ===
2000

- Magical Kanan (Sayaka Mizuki, Tsuyuha)
- Campus (Maiko Kousaka)

2001

- Heisa Byoutou (Satuki Aoyagi)

2002

- Shokuzai no Kyoushitsu (Nanase Hiramatsu)
- Dokusen (Yukino Takanashi)
- Tsuki Kagerou (Youkiri Arima)

2003

- Flutter of Birds II (Rinha Sunohara)
- Office Lingerie (Hitomi)

2004

- Ryokan Shirasagi (Hibari Akisawa)
- Maple Colors (Mirai Aoi)

2006

- Futari no Aniyome (Sayumi)

2007

- Resort Boin (Maya Koromogae)

== General Roles ==
=== Anime ===
1996

- Brave Command Dagwon (Broadcasting staff)

1998

- Let's Nupu-Nupu (???)

1999

- Let's Dance With Papa (Youko)

2001

- Beyblade (Chikushi)

2002

- Lightning Attack Express (Riho)
- Mirmo! (Azumi Hidaka; Gorou)

2003

- Rumbling Hearts (Fumio Hoshino)

2004

- Burst Angel (Mika)
- Operation Sanctuary (Chihiro Tachibana)

2005

- Magical Canan (Tsuyuha)
- Shuffle! (Primula)

2006

- Elemental Gelade (Cicoria "Cocowet" col Wettovi)
- Happiness! (Suzuri Minagi)

2007

- Shuffle! Memories (Primula)
- Kono Aozora ni Yakusoku (Shizu Fujimura)

2008

- Kimi ga Aruji de Shitsuji ga Ore de (Mihato Uesugi)
- Koihime Musō (Son Shoukou/Shouren)
- Shōjo Sect (Shinobu Handa)

2011

- Maji de Watashi ni Koi Shinasai! (Koyuki Sakakibara, Yukihiro)

2013

- Da Capo III (Sakura)
- DD Fist of the North Star (Mother)

=== Video games ===
2002

- Melty Blood (Akiha Tohno)

2003

- Tenerezza (Loro)

2004

- Orange Pocket (Nazuna Ayase)
- Tsuki wa Higashi ni Hi wa Nishi ni ~Operation Sanctuary~ (Chihiro Tachibana, Eri Shibukaki)
- Suigetsu ~Mayoi-Gokoro~ (Suzuran Yamato)

2005

- Kazoku Keikaku ~Kokoro no Kizuna~ (Aoba Takayashiki)
- Angel Wish ~Kimi no Egao ni Chu!~ (Nanami Kidosaki)
- Maple Colors ~Kessen wa Gakuen-sai~ (Mirai Aoi)
- Erementar Gerad: Matoe, Suifu no Ken (???)

2006

- BLOOD+ ONE NIGHT KISS (Michiru Namikawa)
- Gift -prism- (Minagi Nonomura)

2007

- Happiness! De:Lucks (Suzuri Minagi)
- Kono Aozora ni Yakusoku o: Melody of Sun and Sea (Shizu Fujimura)

2008

- Suigetsu ~Portable~ (Suzuran Yamato)

2009

- Kono Aozora ni Yakusoku o: Te no Hira No Rakuen (Shizu Fujimura)
- Really? Really! -RiaRiaDS- (Primula, Koyuou Fuyou)
- Tsuyokiss 2gakki: Swift Love (Erika Kiriyoru)
- Touka Gettan ~Koufuu no Ryouou~ (Nene Midou)

2010

- Kana ~Imouto~ (Miki Kondo)
- Tsuyokiss 2gakki Portable (Erika Kiriyoru)
- 77 (Sevens) ~beyond the Milky way~ (Kotoe Fujikado)

2012

- Tokyo Babel (Kerberos)

2013

- Rebellions: Secret Game 2nd Stage (Hitomi Kasuya)
