= Mobile phone charm =

Dangling mobile phone accessory

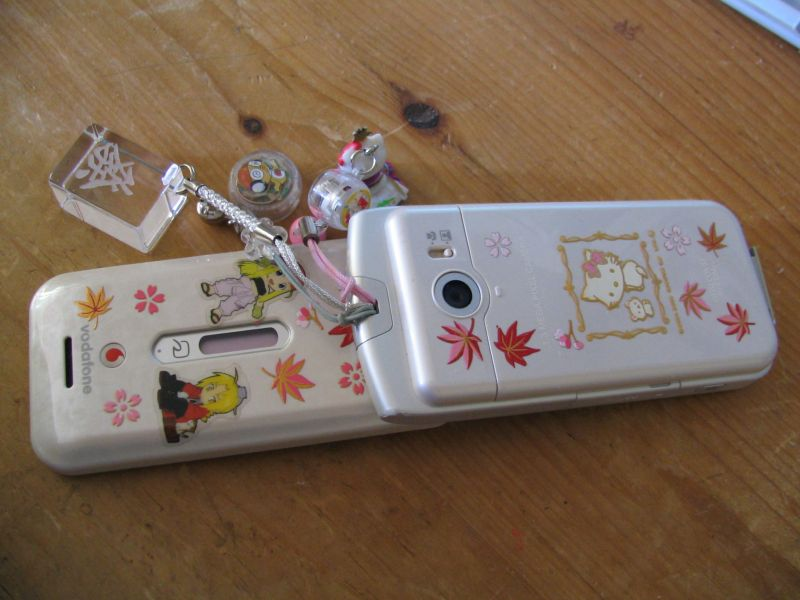
Mahjong tile phone charm

Phone charms (also phone danglers, phone lanyards, phone chains and phone straps) are charms that are connected to a mobile device either via a phone connector or a silicone plug, which fits into the jack port sometimes provided with circle cotters and a lobster clasp, or a small strap, knotted with a cow hitch knot, or a lanyard. Some phones may have a loop hole through which a strap can be attached or a phone case may be needed for the strap in phones that lack a loophole. In Japan, they are known as "keitai straps" (携帯ストラップ). Phone straps have now become a cultural phenomenon beyond their basic utility, and they may be themed with famous characters such as Hello Kitty. Phone straps may also serve additional functions, such as screen cleaning.

== History ==
Phone charms first originated in Japan and later in the United States. They gradually became popular in the United Kingdom and Ireland. In recent years, it has become popular to accessorize a phone this way, and Maki-e stickers are also becoming more common, especially in Japan, and to a lesser extent, other parts of Asia.

When Apple released the iPhone 3GS in 2008, it lacked a slot for attaching accessories. In response, a Korean company invented hanging charms that consumers could attach to the phone using screws.

In 2018, British designer Anya Hindmarch introduced dangling mobile phone charms as part of her "Pimp Your Phones" collection. Cellphone charms have seen a resurgence in popularity corresponding to the Y2K aesthetic trend of the 2020s.

== Types of charms ==
There are a variety of charms available, such as miniature figurines of characters, rhinestone crystal charms, and beaded charms. Some charms flash or light up when the phone rings. Many charms also have a small bell attached. Charms can be found in Gashapon machines, many of which are based on characters from popular franchises. There are also charms that can be utilized as a screen cleaner.

== See also ==
- Charm bracelet
- Key chain
