= Natsumi Yanase =

Japanese voice actress

Natsumi Yanase (やなせ なつみ, Yanase Natsumi; born May 10, 1971) is a Japanese voice actress from Tokyo, Japan. She also goes by the name Izumi Maki (まきいづみ, Maki Izumi) when voicing adult games. Her former stage name was Hiromi Yanase (柳瀬 洋美, Yanase Hiromi).

== Roles ==
=== Anime ===
- D.C. II: Da Capo II (Akane Hanasaki)
- Dragon Ball GT (Palace (Japonais))
- Debutante Detective Corps (Yōko Ryūzaki)
- Ef: A Tale of Memories. (Chihiro Shindō)
- Hanaukyo Maid Team (Yuki Morino)
- Kaginado (Komari Kamikita)
- Lamune (Tae Isawa)
- Little Busters! (Komari Kamikita)
- Maji de Watashi ni Koi Shinasai! (Tatsuko Itagaki)
- Soul Link (Nanami Inatsuki)
- _summer OVA (Konami Hatano)

=== Video games ===
- _Summer (Konami Hatano)
- Atelier Iris: Eternal Mana (Norn)
- Atelier Iris 2: The Azoth of Destiny (Fee)
- Atelier Iris 3: Grand Phantasm (Nell Ellis)
- D.C. II: Da Capo II (Akane Hanasaki)
- Ef: The First Tale. (Chihiro Shindō)
- Ef: The Latter Tale. (Chihiro Shindō)
- Grisaia no Kajitsu (Chizuru Tachibana)
- Haru no Ashioto (Yuzuki Kaede)
- Hoshiuta (Yurika Amamiya)
- I/O (Ea)
- Island Days (Kokoro Katsura)
- Lamune (Tae Isawa)
- Little Busters! (Komari Kamikita)
- Logos Panic
- Love & Destroy (LuLu)
- Maji de Watashi ni Koi Shinasai! (Tatsuko Itagaki)
- Moe! Ninja Girls RPG (Waka Kyogoku)
- Narcissu: Side 2nd (Himeko)
- Rapelay (Manaka Kiryū)
- Riviera: The Promised Land (Fia)
- Sakura Sakura (Nanako Sakura)
- Strip Battle Days (Kokoro Katsura) (credited as "Izumi Maki")
- Valkyrie Profile (Nanami, Lemia)
- Heart de Roommate (Tomoe Katsuragi)
- Tintin: Destination Adventure (Tin Tin)

=== Drama ===
- Kyuukyoku Parodius (Tako A)
