= Softgarage =

Japanese media company

Softgarage 株式会社ソフトガレージ
- Company type: KK
- Industry: Entertainment
- Founded: July 26, 1989
- Headquarters: Shibuya, Tokyo, Japan
- Products: Anime; Games; Character goods; Music; Books
- Divisions: Pink Pineapple

Softgarage (ソフトガレージ, Sofutogarēji) is a Japanese company that produces anime, games, character goods, music, and books. Softgarage was the company that produced the GR: Giant Robo anime. Though Softgarage primarily focuses on the production of original video animation (OVAs), it has also worked on anime television series and anime film. Softgarage has also delved into the production of anime related goods, such as mousepads.

They also own the hentai OVA label Pink Pineapple, which they inherited when they bought the rights to KSS's assets after KSS went bankrupt in 2005.

== History ==
The company was first founded on July 26, 1989.

== Major works ==
=== OVA series ===
- Guardian Hearts/Guardian Hearts! Power UP!
- Wind: A Breath of Heart
- Lime-iro Senkitan
- _Summer
- Minami no Teiō

=== Anime television ===
- Kakyuusei 2
- GR: Giant Robo
- Lime-iro Senkitan

=== Other ===
- Natural Woman (film)
- Mujara (art book series)
