= Stepsibling =

Child of a step-parent to whom one is not biologically related

Adam	Agatha	Ben	Betty
	Charles		David

Charles and David are stepsiblings as they are joined by the marriage of their parents Ben and Agatha.

Stepsiblings are children born of two different families who have been joined by marriage. A male stepsibling is a stepbrother and a female is a stepsister. The stepsiblings relationship is connected through law and is not a blood relation.

Stepsiblings are sometimes abbreviated informally as stepsibs.

== Terminology ==
The prefix step originates from the old English "steop" meaning bereaved or orphaned. Today it refers to a blended family where children are from each parent's previous life.

Stepsiblings are distinct from:

- Half-siblings share a biological connection to one but not both parents.
- Adoptive siblings are legally related but not related through blood.

== Culture ==
In many fairy tales, the central character has a stepmother and the stepsiblings serve as an extension of their mother. Cinderella and Mother Hulda features wicked stepsisters who take after their parents. The story Kate Crackernuts serves as a counterexample where the daughter of the evil stepparent is a loving stepsister.

Many romance novels feature heroes who are the stepbrother of the heroine. The step-relationship generally stems from a marriage when the hero and heroine are at least in their adolescence.

Some family films and television sitcoms feature a blended nuclear family including siblings as the center premise. In many cases, the step-family is large and full of children causing situations such as sibling rivalry, rooming, falling in love, and getting along amongst the children as popular plot-lines. This premise gained traction with the 1968 films Yours, Mine and Ours and With Six You Get Eggroll and the 1969 launch of the television sitcom The Brady Bunch. Some contemporary family sitcoms have made the blended family sitcom more popular with the TGIF show Step by Step bringing about other shows such as Aliens in the Family, Life with Derek, Drake & Josh, and the short-lived NBC family sitcom Something So Right. The Disney Channel animated series Phineas and Ferb also prominently features a blended family, chosen by co-creator Jeff "Swampy" Marsh in part due to its under-use in children's programming, and his personal experiences growing up in such a family.
