= Akane Tomonaga =

Japanese voice actress

- 友永 朱音
- Born: December 2, 1975 (age 49); Tokyo, Japan
- Occupation: Voice actress
- Years active: 1996–present
- Agent: Axlone
- Height: 158 cm (5 ft 2 in)

Akane Tomonaga (友永 朱音, Tomonaga Akane; born December 2, 1975), also known as Yukari Aoyama (青山 ゆかり, Aoyama Yukari), is a Japanese voice actress from Tokyo, Japan.

== Filmography ==
=== Anime ===
- Jigoku Sensei Nūbē (1996), Tomoko
- Hell Girl (2005), Yōko
- Lamune (2005), Hikari Nakazato
- Higurashi When They Cry (2006–2007), Receptionist, Nurse
- Underbar Summer (2006), Wakana Shimazu
- Kotetsushin Jeeg (2007), TV Announcer
- Sisters of Wellber (2008), Iruga
- Chaos;Head (2008), Orgel Seira
- Koihime Musō (2008–2010), Kaku (Ei)
- Yozakura Quartet (2008), Schoolgirl
- We Without Wings (2011), Akira Yoshikawa
- Horizon in the Middle of Nowhere (2011), Captain
- Maji de Watashi ni Koi Shinasai! (2011), Kazuko Kawakami
- Diabolik Lovers (2013), Cordelia
- In Search of the Lost Future (2014), Yui Furukawa
- The Fruit of Grisaia (2014), Kazuki Kazami
- Time Bokan 24: The Villains' Strike Back (2017), Yáng Yuhuan
- Black Rock Shooter: Dawn Fall (2022), Lunatic

=== Video games ===
- Tristia of the Deep-Blue Sea (2002), Rafarew
- Snow Sakura (2003), Saki Tachibana
- Remember 11: The Age of Infinity (2004), Suzukage Hotori
- Underbar Summer (2005), Wakana Shimazu
- Harukoi Otome (2006), Riru Orito
- Seinarukana: The Spirit of Eternity Sword 2 (2007), Nagamine Nozomi (under the alias Yukari Aoyama)
- Chaos;Head (2008), Orgel Seira
- Hoshiuta (2008), Midori Kinoshita
- We Without Wings (2009), Akira Yoshikawa
- Maji de Watashi ni Koi Shinasai! (2009), Kazuko Kawakami
- In Search of the Lost Future (2010), Yui Furukawa
- Kamidori Alchemy Meister (2011), Black Eushully/Jane
- Root Double: Before Crime * After Days (2012), Jun Moribe
- Blue Archive (2022), Sorai Saki

== Dubbing roles ==
List of Japanese dubbing performances in films and series
Year	Title	Role	Notes
2021	Bad Cat	Misscat	Japanese Ver

=== Drama CD ===
- Mashiroiro Symphony (2010), Eleanor Sewell
