= Lamune =

Japanese adult visual novel developed by Neko Neko Soft

- Lamune DVD cover

ラムネ (Ramune)
- Genre: Drama, Romance, Slice of life story
- Video game
- Developer: Neko Neko Soft
- Publisher: Neko Neko Soft (PC); Interchannel (PS2)
- Genre: Visual novel
- Platform: PC, PlayStation 2
- Released: July 30, 2004 (PC); August 25, 2005 (PS2)
- Light novel
- Written by: Okada Runa
- Illustrated by: Ankoromochi
- Published by: Paradigm
- Original run: November 2004 – January 2005
- Volumes: 2
- Anime television series

Lamune: Garasu Bin ni Utsuru Umi
- Directed by: Jun Takada
- Studio: Trinet Entertainment; Picture Magic (Note: Animation production assistance (アニメーション制作協力) for all episodes provided by Radix.)
- Original network: Chiba TV, KTV, TVS, THK, tvk
- Original run: October 11, 2005 – December 27, 2005
- Episodes: 12
- Manga
- Illustrated by: Rino Fujii
- Published by: Kadokawa Shoten
- Magazine: Comp Ace
- Published: January 26, 2006
- Volumes: 1
- Light novel
- Written by: Takamitsu Kouno
- Illustrated by: Genichiro Kondo
- Published by: Megami Bunko
- Published: February 1, 2006
- Volumes: 1
- icon

Lamune (ラムネ, Ramune) is a Japanese adult visual novel developed by Neko Neko Soft. Originally released on July 30, 2004, for the PC. it was followed by an all-ages version for the PlayStation 2, and was released on August 25, 2005. A twelve-episode anime series based on the visual novel, entitled Lamune: Garasu Bin ni Utsuru Umi (ラムネ 〜ガラスびんに映る海〜; lit. Lamune: Sea Reflected in the Glass Bottle), was produced by Trinet Entertainment and Picture Magic and aired between October 11, 2005, and December 27, 2005. Light novels, drama CDs, and one volume of a manga adaptation have also been produced.

== Plot ==
Kenji Tomosaka moved to a coastal town as a child. The sea spread in front of him shines like ramune, reflecting the sunlight of the summer.

He meets Nanami Konoe, who lives next door. As time passes, their shared memories have accumulated. They think of their normal lives and relationships as precious things.

The sun begins to shine strongly, cicadas begin to buzz, and the sky clears up. For Kenji and Nanami, it is not just another ordinary summer.

== Characters ==
=== Main characters ===
Kenji Tomosaka (友坂 健次, Tomosaka Kenji)
Voiced by: Kishō Taniyama (anime)
Kenji is the male leading character of the story. He is a 2nd year high school student. He and his childhood friend, Nanami, are inseparable; They take turns waking each other, walk to and from school together, and tend her family's vegetable field on the outskirts of town. He owns a vintage Triumph motorcycle, passed down to him by his father. He had wanted that motorcycle ever since he was a child, and his father finally decided to give it to him, even though it was always breaking down. Kenji really likes Nanami, but he is too shy to confess his feelings and therefore teases her to hide them.

Nanami Konoe (近衛 七海, Konoe Nanami)
Voiced by: Ran Tōno (PC)/Yūko Gotō(anime/PS2)
Nanami is the female leading character of the story. She has long lavender hair. She is Kenji’s childhood best friend, next-door neighbor, and classmate at school. Her family owns a vegetable field on the outskirts of town, which she tends with Kenji's help. She and Kenji take turns waking each other up every morning.
Profile:
- Birth date: May 20
- Favorite food: Home-grown vegetables
- Favorite drink: 100% fruit juice

Suzuka Tomosaka (友坂 鈴夏, Tomosaka Suzuka)
Voiced by: Hina Kamimura (PC)/Mikako Satō(anime/PS2)
She is Kenji's younger, light blue-haired sister. Suzuka is a gentle, active, and innocent character.
Profile:
- Birth date: August 22
- Favorite food: Spaghetti with tomato sauce
- Favorite drink: Lemon tea

Hikari Nakazato (仲里 ひかり, Nakazato Hikari)
Voiced by: Yukari Aoyama (PC)/Akane Tomonaga(anime/PS2)
Hikari is Kenji and Suzuka's older cousin. She is short and has long, golden hair done in twin tails. She is somewhat quick-tempered and is a tomboy. Hikari may be annoying at times, but she really cares for her cousins and Nanami and is willing to help them when they're in trouble. Hatano, Kenji's friend and classmate, is crazy about Hikari and pesters her when she visits her cousins during the summer. She loves spicy food.
Profile:
- Birth date: March 20
- Favorite food: Tom yam kung
- Favorite drink: Milk or almost all of carbonated soft drinks

Tae Isawa (石和 多恵, Isawa Tae)
Voiced by: Izumi Maki (PC)/Natsumi Yanase(anime/PS2)
Tae is the Student Council President and Kenji’s senpai in school. She has short dark purple hair and is often seen wearing her jersey. She is a very mature, good-tempered, and responsible person. She has three younger siblings (two brothers and one sister) to take care of.
Profile:
- Birth date: February 2
- Favorite food: Mitarashidango (a kind of dango)
- Favorite drink: Hojicha

Hiromi Sakura (佐倉 裕美, Sakura Hiromi)
Voiced by: Sakura Takatsuki (PC)/Hiroko Taguchi(anime/PS2)
Hiromi is Suzuka's black-haired classmate. She is a soft-spoken and timid girl who has been infatuated with Kenji since childhood. She confesses to him just before she has to move away.
Profile:
- Favorite food: Anmitsu, Mitsumame
- Favorite drink: Ramune

Misora Ayukawa (鮎川 美空, Ayukawa Misora)
Voiced by: Ryōko Shintani(anime/PS2)
Misora is a biker girl whose bike, a Honda CB400 SUPER BOL D'OR, breaks down just outside town while she is touring in the countryside. She stays at Kenji's house until the required parts are delivered and works at Nanami's family's cafe to earn the money she needs for the repairs. She has pink hair with a cowlick and two short twin tails.
Profile:
- Favorite food: French toast
- Favorite drink: Sports drink

=== Side characters ===
Hatano (端野, Hatano)
Voiced by: Shintaro Ōhata(anime/PS2)
Kenji’s friend and classmate, Hatano, serves as comic relief. He has a crush on Kenji's cousin, Hikari, and tries to make moves on her whenever she visits, but is always turned down. He would do anything for her to the point of becoming her slave.

Kagami Konoe (近衛 各務, Konoe Kagami)
Voiced by: Suzune Kusunoki(PC)/Erika Narumi(anime/PS2)
Kagami is Nanami's mother who runs a kissaten or coffee shop right across the street from their house. She has a kind and gentle personality. Because of her youthful appearance, she is often mistaken for Nanami's elder sister.

Kenryū Tomosaka (友坂 健柳流, Tomosaka Kenryū)
Voiced by: Takashi Nagasako(anime/PS2)
Kenji and Suzuka’s father who is a judo instructor at Suzuka's school. He is very strict when teaching her and does not accept failure. He is also adamant that Kenji takes care of his motorcycle.

== Music (game) ==
Opening Theme

- "Just Kidding 76's" (なんてね76's, Nantene 76's)
  Performed by: Hiromi Satou
  Lyrics by: Tomo Kataoka
  Composition and arrangement by: Hitoshi Fujima (Elements Garden)

Ending Theme

- "Lamune" (ラムネ, Ramune)
  Performed by: Duca
  Lyrics by: Tomo Kataoka
  Composition by: Hijiri Anze
  Arrangement by: Katsumichi Harada

Insert Theme (PC)

- "Evening Calm" (夕凪, Yūnagi)
  Performed by: KAKO
  Lyrics by: Yanachī
  Composition by: Jan Amano
  Arrangement by: Takehiro Kawabe

Insert Theme (PS2)

- "Two(Lamune 79's)" (ふたり(ラムネ79's), Futari(Ramune79's))
  Performed by: KAKO
  Lyrics by: Nachi Kio
  Composition and arrangement by: Hitoshi Fujima (Elements Garden)

== Music (anime) ==
Opening Theme

- "The Melody of Lemonade’s Color" (ラムネ色のメロディ, Ramune Iro no Merodi): Episodes 01 - 12
  Performed by: Mayu
  Lyrics by: Tomu
  Composition by: Raito
  Arrangement by: Yougo Kanno

Ending Theme

- "Summer vacation": Episodes 01 - 11
  Performed by: Ayumi Murata
  Lyrics by: Tomu
  Composition and arrangement by: TARAWO
- "Just Kidding 76's" (なんてね76's, Nantene 76's): Episode 12 insert ending theme.
  Performed by: Hiromi Satou
  Lyrics by: Tomo Kataoka
  Composition and arrangement by: Hitoshi Fujima (Elements Garden)

Insert Theme

- "A Sea Bluer than Ever" (いつもより青い海, Itsumo Yori Aoi Umi): Episode 01
  Performed by: Tae Isawa (CV: Natsumi Yanase)
  Lyrics and composition by: Yuuko Yamaguchi
  Arrangement by: Kazuo Satou
- "The Meteor of Dreams" (夢いっぱいの箒星, Yume Ippai no Houkiboshi): Episodes 03 & 05
  Performed by: Suzuka Tomosaka (CV: Mikako Satou)
  Lyrics by: Tomu
  Composition by: Nozomu Nakamura
  Arrangement by: KANKE
- "Kira Kira": Episodes 06 & 10
  Performed by: Nanami Konoe (CV: Yūko Gotō)
  Lyrics and composition by: Nozomu Nakamura
  Arrangement by: Kazuo Satou
- "Time Machine" (タイムマシーン, Taimu Mashīn): Episodes 07 & 09
  Performed by: Misora Ayukawa (CV: Ryouko Shintani)
  Lyrics and composition by: Ritsuko Miyajima
  Arrangement by: Fumikazu Takenaka
- "Lovely Season" (大好きなSeason, Daisuki na Season): Episode 07
  Performed by: Hikari Nakazato (CV: Akane Tomonaga)
  Lyrics and composition by: Rie
  Arrangement by: Yasufumi Yamashita
- "The Sky of Sometime" (いつかの空, Itsuka no Sora): Episode 09
  Performed by: Hiromi Sakura (CV: Hiroko Taguchi)
  Lyrics by: Himi Izutsu
  Composition by: YORI
  Arrangement by: Yousuke Sugimoto
- "Eyes Sunshine" (瞳サンシャイン, Hitomi Sanshain): Episode 10
  Performed by: Tae Isawa (CV: Natsumi Yanase)
  Lyrics and composition by: Yuuko Yamaguchi
  Arrangement by: Kazuo Satou

== DVD ==
Six DVDs of anime series were released by Interchannel in Japan.

- Lamune DVD Vol.1 (Eps. 01 - 02)
- Lamune DVD Vol.2 (Eps. 03 - 04)
- Lamune DVD Vol.3 (Eps. 05 - 06)
- Lamune DVD Vol.4 (Eps. 07 - 08)
- Lamune DVD Vol.5 (Eps. 09 - 10)
- Lamune DVD Vol.6 (Eps. 11 - 12)

== CD Albums ==
Opening and ending Single albums

- Opening theme song Single: "The Melody of Lemonade’s Color" (ラムネ色のメロディ, Ramune Iro no Merodi) performed by Mayu.
- Ending theme song Single: "Summer vacation" (NECM-12104) performed by Ayumi Murata.
- Lamune Original Soundtrack Complete Edition composed by Yūko Fukushima.

Character image songs and drama albums

Six character image songs and drama albums were released by Interchannel in Japan.

- Lamune Characters Collection Vol.1 Nanami Konoe (CV: Yuko Gotō) "Kira Kira" (NECM-12113)
- Lamune Characters Collection Vol.2 Hikari Nakazato (CV: Akane Tomonaga) "Lovely Season" (大好きなSeason, Daisuki na Season; NECM-12115)
- Lamune Characters Collection Vol.3 Suzuka Tomosaka (CV: Mikako Satō) "The Meteor of Dreams" (夢いっぱいの箒星, Yume Ippai no Houkiboshi; NECM-12116)
- Lamune Characters Collection Vol.4 Tae Isawa (CV: Natsumi Yanase) "Eyes Sunshine" (瞳サンシャイン, Hitomi Sanshain; NECM-12118)
- Lamune Characters Collection Vol.5 Misora Ayukawa (CV: Ryōko Shintani) "Time Machine" (タイムマシーン, Taimu Mashīn)
- Lamune Characters Collection Vol.6 Hiromi Sakura (CV: Hiroko Taguchi) "The Sky of Sometime" (いつかの空, Itsuka no Sora)

== Media ==
=== Books ===
One game fanbook for the PS2 version was published by JIVE in Japan.

- Lamune ~The Glass Jar that Reflects the Sea~ Visual Guide Book - ISBN 978-4-86176-242-0
  Release date: October 2005

A light novel mainly adapted between episodes 07–08 was published by Megami Bunko (Gakken). Written by Takamitsu Kouno, and illustrated by Genichiro Kondo.

- Lamune - ISBN 4-05-903507-6
  Release date: February 2006

Paradigm has published two 18 prohibited light novels based on the game, the first was published in early November 2004, and the second was published in January 2005. Both books were written by Okada Runa and illustrated by Ankoromochi. One focuses on Nanami's scenario, and the other focuses on Tae.

=== Manga ===
A manga illustrated by Rino Fujii was published in the Japanese manga magazine Comp Ace on Jan 26, 2006, published by Kadokawa Shoten.

=== Anime ===
A twelve-episode anime series was produced by Trinet Entertainment and Picture Magic. It is based on the visual novel and is entitled Lamune: Garasu Bin ni Utsuru Umi (ラムネ 〜ガラスびんに映る海〜; lit. Lamune: Sea Reflected in the Glass Bottle). The anime was directed by Jun Takada, and airs on the networks Chiba TV, Kansai TV, Teletama, Tokai TV, and tvk.

==== Episode list ====
No.	Title	Original release date
1	"The Hermit Crab and the Straw Hat"; Transliteration: "Yadokari to Mugiwara Boushi" (Japanese: ヤドカリと麦わら帽子)	October 11, 2005
When Kenji Tomosaka moved to a new coastal town, many years ago, he met a girl on the beach who was playing with some hermit crabs. She runs away crying after Kenji puts a crab on her head. When he gets back to his new home, he finds out the girl is his next-door neighbor, and that his and her balconies are close enough that he could jump from one to the other. In the present time, Kenji wakes up after a strange dream and then heads over to wake up Nanami Konoe. He finds her lying in the space between her bed and her wall and helps her out of it. Now begins the story of these two close childhood friends.
2	"The Summer Field and the Nanami Special"; Transliteration: "Natsu no Hatake to Nanami Supesharu" (Japanese: 夏の畑とななみすぺしゃる)	October 18, 2005
Back when Kenji and Nanami were young, they played on the beach and had a lot of fun. Back in the now, a small conversation between Sakura and Kenji leaves Nanami angry at him, but they end up on good terms again, with some help from Nanami's mother. They then head to Nanami's field, and work a bit there whilst talking about the past.
3	"Little Cousin and Fireworks"; Transliteration: "Chicchana Itoko to Hanabi" (Japanese: ちっちゃなイトコと花火)	October 25, 2005
In a flashback, we see the first time Nanami took Kenji to her field outside the town. Back in the now, Kenji's cousin Hikari is visiting; she is staying there during summer vacation. In the evening, the very same day, Kenji, Nanami, Suzuka, Hikari, and Hatano enjoy themselves with fireworks.
4	"The School Council President and the Reward"; Transliteration: "Jichikaichou to Gohoubi" (Japanese: 自治会長とごほうび)	November 1, 2005
This episode focuses mostly on Tae. She is taking care of her younger siblings and has done so for a long time, as revealed by a flashback. On top of that, she is also a member of the Student Council, and she is arranging a plan for cleaning up around the town. Most of the main cast volunteers for this, and they all enjoy a day of cleaning up around town.
5	"The Starry Sky and a Telescope"; Transliteration: "Hoshizora to Bouenkyou" (Japanese: 星空と望遠鏡)	November 8, 2005
When Suzuka and Kenji were kids, they tried to watch a meteor shower, but could not because of where they lived. They decided to make a promise to try to watch again after they moved. In the present, another meteor shower is coming up, and Suzuka hears what seems to be Kenji wanting to break their promise.
6	"Three People and Two Pearls"; Transliteration: "Sannin to Futatsu no Shinju" (Japanese: 三人と二つの真珠)	November 15, 2005
When Kenji, Nanami, and Hikari were kids, they found an oyster with 2 pearls in it. It was decided that Hikari would keep the pearls since there were only two of them. Back in the present, Hikari has enrolled in Kenji's school, causing trouble for him. On top of that, she has begun diving more, but what is she looking for?
7	"Biker Girl and Part-Time Job"; Transliteration: "Baiku Shōjo to Arubaito" (Japanese: バイク少女とアルバイト)	November 22, 2005
When Misora Ayukawa's bike breaks down, she ends up staying at Kenji's. Although he tries to fix her bike, he ends up making things worse, and his father has to fix his screw-ups. The next day, Kenji tries to help her find a part-time job, but has very little success. Later, Kenji tries to apologize to an upset Nanami.
8	"The Bond Between the Two and Swaying Feelings"; Transliteration: "Futari no Kizuna to Yureru Omoi" (Japanese: ふたりの絆と揺れる想い)	November 29, 2005
Tae asks Kenji to meet her alone after school, but when he arrives, he finds Hiromi there instead. She confesses her feelings for him, even knowing that they are unrequited, because her family is moving away. When Nanami asks Kenji what happened, he doesn't say anything. During the class field trip, Kenji ends up spending more time with Hiromi than Nanami, much to her displeasure.
9	"The Distance Between the Two and a Lamune Bottle"; Transliteration: "Futari no Kyori to Ramune no Bin" (Japanese: ふたりの距離とラムネの瓶)	December 6, 2005
A flashback shows that Hiromi and Kenji met when they were kids. Hiromi was immediately smitten by Kenji, who traded her a bottle of lamune for her blue hairpin. Before giving her the bottle, Kenji took a drink from it: an indirect kiss in the making. Ever since then, Hiromi has cherished the bottle. Sad that she is moving away, she is pleasantly surprised by Kenji and the others who arrive to help pack and spend what little time remains with her. As the finish packing, Hiromi's precious bottle is accidentally broken. Later, Kenji and Nanami see her off to the train, and Kenji gives her another bottle of lamune. Amazed that he remembered, she gives them some last-minute advice before she leaves.
10	"The Folk Dance and Overlapping Hearts"; Transliteration: "Fōkudansu to Kasanaru Kokoro" (Japanese: フォークダンスとかさなる心)	December 13, 2005
Kenji and Nanami decide to go on a date around town. Although they have a good time, the bike breaks down on them, stranding them at an inn. Deciding to break the awkwardness of having to share a room, Kenji and Nanami go down to the lake, where Nanami confesses her feelings for Kenji, but will Kenji accept them?
11	"The Typhoon Night and the End of Summer"; Transliteration: "Taifū no Yoru to Natsu no Owari" (Japanese: 台風の夜と夏の終わり)	December 20, 2005
Years ago, a typhoon hit, and Kenji jumped the gap between his and Nanami's house to comfort Nanami. In the present, another typhoon threatens, and instead of Kenji going to Nanami, she comes to his room. Nanami collapses due to stomach pain, and with phone service disrupted by the storm, Kenji is forced to take Nanami to the hospital in a hand cart. While she's recovering from her appendectomy, Kenji tends to the garden in her place. While he's returning to the hospital on his motorbike to take her home (not knowing that Suzuka and the others have already done so), the road, weakened by the rain from the typhoon, gives way before him. Nanami goes to the garden searching for Kenji, not knowing that he has been hurt.
12	"100 Loans and 100 Debts"; Transliteration: "Hyakko no Kashi to Hyakko no Kari" (Japanese: 100個の貸しと100個の借り)	December 27, 2005
Nanami stays at Kenji's bedside, refusing to go to school, but no matter how much she wants Kenji to wake up, he remains comatose. The season passes, and everyone starts moving on in their own way. Come the spring term, Nanami also returns to school but has to repeat her second year, and she continues to visit Kenji every day. Finally, the summer break arrives, and Kenji comes out of his coma to everyone's relief.

== Staff ==
- Original Work: Neko Neko Software
- Director: Jun Takada
- Producer: Yoshihiro Ikeda, Saburo Ōmiya, Takashi Nakanishi
- Executive Producer: Masaki Kobayashi, Akira Akamatsu
- Series Composition: Takamitsu Kōno
- Script: Daisuke Ishibashi, Takamitsu Kōno, Tsutomu Kaneko
- Storyboard: Jun Takada, Tetsuya Endo
- Episode Director: Jun Takada, Shintaro Itoga
- Character Draft: Yūki Osamu, Mochi Ankoro
- Character Design: Gen'ichiro Kondo
- Composite Director: Atsushi Nakayama
- Art Supervision: Tadao Kubota
- Color Design: Maki Tanaka
- Sound Manager: Kaoru Machida
- Sound Producer: Kōichi Izuka
- Sound Works: Trinet Entertainment
- Music: Yuuko Fukushima
- Music Producer: Kazuo Ōnuki
- Music Works: Interchannel
- Animation Director: Chiyoko Sakamoto, Megumi Noda, Yuka Hasegawa
- Animation Producer: Toshirō Sakuma (Studio Ranmaru), Takashi Nomura (Radix Ace Entertainment)
- Assistant Producer: Kōsaku Sakamoto (Trinet Entertainment)
- Animation Production: Trinet Entertainment, Inc., Picture Magic
- Animation Production Assistant: Radix Ace Entertainment Co., Ltd.
