= Kantaro: The Sweet Tooth Salaryman =

2017 television series

Kantaro: The Sweet Tooth Salaryman (さぼリーマン甘太朗, Saboriman Kantarou) is a comedy-drama television series co-produced by Netflix and TV Tokyo. The plot revolves around Ametani Kantarou, played by Onoe Matsuya II, a salaryman who works at a publishing house. His colleagues perceive him as a fast and efficient worker that everyone can trust, but in reality he slacks off from work to eat sweets. Its first season has twelve 24-minutes episodes and was released by TV Tokyo between 13 July and 29 September 2017, and by Netflix on 7 July 2017.

The series is based on the manga series Saboriman Ametani Kantarou written by Tensei Hagiwara and illustrated by Inoue ABD.

Although the story is fictional, the show features real locations and dessert hotspots in Tokyo. Each episode is centered on a typical Japanese dessert such as anmitsu, kakigōri, or mitsumame, or a Japanese interpretation of a foreign dish such as parfait, eclair, pancake or matcha bavarois.

== Cast ==
- Onoe Matsuya II (尾上松也) as Ametani Kantarou
- Ishikawa Ren (石川恋) as Dobashi Kanako
- Minagawa Sarutoki (皆川猿時) as Miyake Toru
- Onoue Hiroyuki (尾上寛之) as Yamaji Daisuke
- Shimizu Hazuki (清水葉月) as Sano Erika

Others

- Kentaro Ito (伊藤健太郎) as Takarabe Yutaka
- Yagi Masayasu (八木将康) as Gogase Hiroki
- Nakamura Yasuhi (中村靖日) as Matsuzawa Fuufu
- Moriguchi Yoko (森口瑤子) as Ametani Eriko

== Production credits ==
- Original writing: Manga Saboriman Ametani Kantarou by Hagiwara Tensei (萩原天晴)
- Screenwriter: Murakami Hiroki (村上大樹), Adachi Shin (足立紳), Yamaguchi Toshiyuki (山口智之), Sakai Yoshifumi (酒井善史)
- Producer: Narita Gaku, Kobayashi Fuminori (小林史憲)
- Director: Moriya Kentaro (守屋健太郎) 6 episodes, Ishida Yusuke (石田雄介) 4 episodes, Takashima Natsuki 2 episodes
- Music: Makido Taro (牧戸太郎)
- Theme song: "Ice Cream" (アイスクリーム) Itowokashi (イトヲカシ)

== Episodes ==
Season 1
No. overall	No. in season	Title	Directed by	Written by	Original release date	Prod. code
1	1	"Anmitsu"	Kentarô Moriya	TBA	TBA	101
Systems programmer Kantaro starts his first day as a sales rep in a publishing company. His colleagues think he is cool and efficient but he's really only working so hard so has time to play hooky and eat sweets! In this episode he visits the Kanmidokoro Hatsune, a traditional sweets shop in Ningyōchō.
2	2	"Kakigori"	Kentarô Moriya	TBA	TBA	102
On a hot day, Kantaro can't wait to enjoy an icy delight. Unfortunately, he's not the only one... One of the two kakigori places in this episode is Kooriya Peace (氷屋ぴぃす) which is located in Kichijōji.
3	3	"Mamekan"	Kentarô Moriya	TBA	TBA	103
With a suspicious Dobashi breathing down his neck, Kantaro attempts to complete a mamekan triathlon. The three shops featured in this episode are Kanmidokoro Irie, Umemura and Sagamiya.
4	4	"Parfait"	Yusuke Ishida	TBA	TBA	104
Kantaro reaches top sales despite his clandestine activity. He couldn't care less but ultra-competitive Takarabe has other plans. Kantaro had peach parfait at Kajitsuen Libre in Shinjuku. Dobashi brings dorayaki from Seijuken to the office as a trap for Kantaro.
5	5	"Hotcakes"	Yusuke Ishida	TBA	TBA	105
Kantaro will have to shake the rookie tagging along and grilling him for sales tips if he wants to taste the heavenly hotcakes he’s been eyeing. Dobashi suspects that Kantaro might be the author of the popular sweets blog, AmaBlo. Kantaro manages to have hotcakes at Coffee Tengoku in Asakusa.
6	6	"Matcha Bavarian Cream"	Natsuki Takashima	TBA	TBA	106
Kantaro is stalked by a manga artist who is looking for inspiration for his next, long-awaiting work. In order to satisfy his craving for a fusion dessert, Kantaro will have to mediate marital trouble between the artist and his Western wife. Meanwhile, Dobashi continues to try and catch Kantaro out. This episode features Kinozen in Iidabashi, Tokyo.
7	7	"Savarin"	Natsuki Takashima	TBA	TBA	107
Dobashi goes on an errand with her boss who is acting odd. They end up enjoying a decadent savarin cake at a French cafe, Café Recherche in Yokohama. The shop is now permanently closed since September 2019.
8	8	"Ohagi"	Yusuke Ishida	TBA	TBA	108
Kantaro accepts a babysitting gig for his boss so he can gorge on a traditional sweet. He has to sweet talk the sour kid with a box of surprising ohagi. Kantaro gets his ohagi in this episode from Takeno to Ohagi.
9	9	"Éclair"	Yusuke Ishida	TBA	TBA	109
Kantaro is trying to enjoy a special treat but with the surprise visit of his sweets-hating, dentist mother, Kantaro will have to use all his wiles if he's going to get away with it. The éclairs are from Rue de Passy.
10	10	"Caramel Pudding"	Kentarô Moriya	TBA	TBA	110
After being tempted away during his late night work obligations, Kantaro remains loyal to the voluptuous caramel pudding that first caught his eye. The Italian-style restaurant that serves the caramel pudding is Esse Due in Akasaka.
11	11	"Chocolate"	Kentarô Moriya	TBA	TBA	111
Kantaro teaches his foil, Takarabe the importance of self-indulgence by taking him on an enlightening chocolate-filled experience. Minimal is the chocolate shop featured in this episode.
12	12	"Mont Blanc"	Kentarô Moriya	TBA	TBA	112
Kantaro is starting to lose his composure due to overwork. Will he get to enjoy any seasonal treats this autumn? The chestnut-themed shop is Waguriya.

== See also ==
- List of original programs distributed by Netflix
- Wagashi
