= Chichi dango =

Type of Japanese confectionery

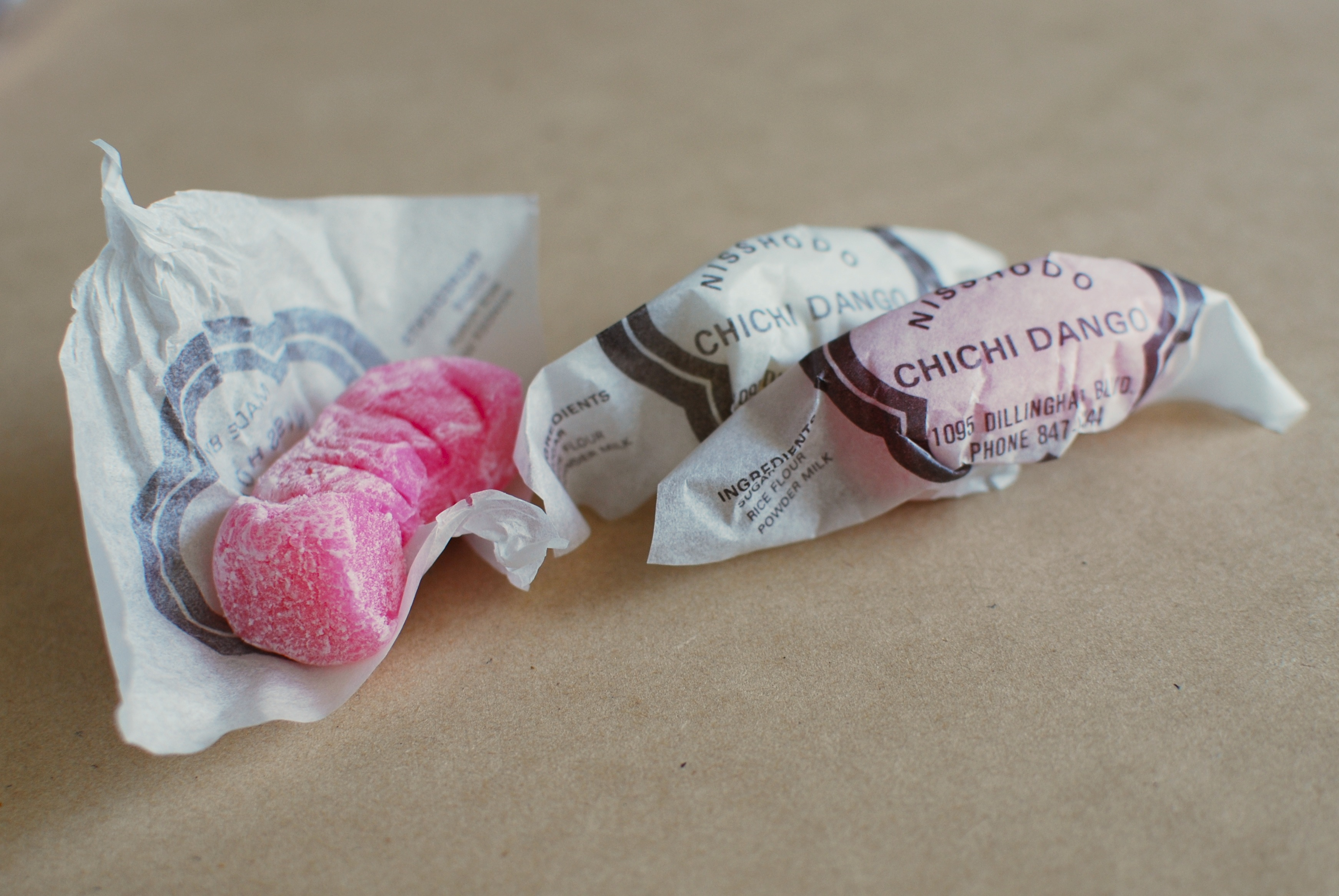
Chichi dango from the Nisshodo Candy Store in Honolulu, Hawaii

Chichi dango (乳団子 "milk dango") is a soft, sweet type of dango of Japanese origin. It is considered a type of dessert confection made of mochiko (sweet rice flour), and is popular in Hawaii, particularly during Girls' Day celebrations.

== See also ==
- Botan Rice Candy
- Hawaiian cuisine
- Mochi
