= Mitarashi dango =

Skewered rice dumplings with sweet soy sauce

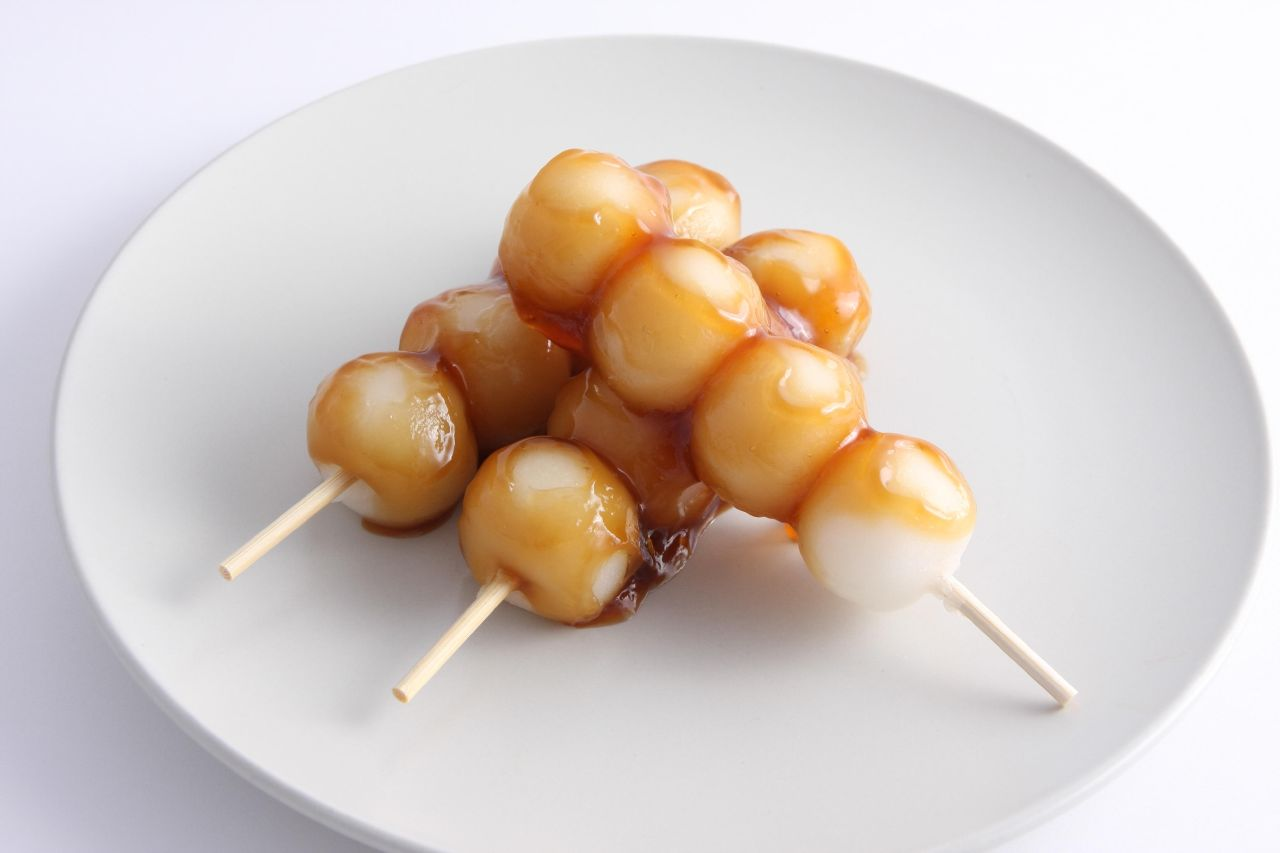
- Mitarashi dango
- Type: Dango
- Course: Dessert, snack
- Place of origin: Japan
- Region or state: Kyoto
- Created by: Mitarashi Tea House
- Main ingredients: Glutinous rice flour, sweet soy sauce

Mitarashi dango (みたらし団子、御手洗団子) are a type of Japanese dango (rice dumpling) covered with a sweet soy sauce glaze. They are skewered onto sticks in groups of 3–5 (traditionally 5) and are characterized by their glassy glaze and burnt fragrance.

== Origin ==
Mitarashi dango allegedly originates from the Kamo Mitarashi Tea House in the Shimogamo area of Sakyo-ku ward of Kyoto, Japan. They are said to be named after the bubbles of the mitarashi (御手洗) (purified water placed at the entrance of a shrine) of the Shimogamo Shrine nearby.

Another theory is that the 5-dango version sold at the original tea house was made to imitate a human body; the top-most dango represented the head, and the remaining four represented the arms and legs.

== Gallery ==
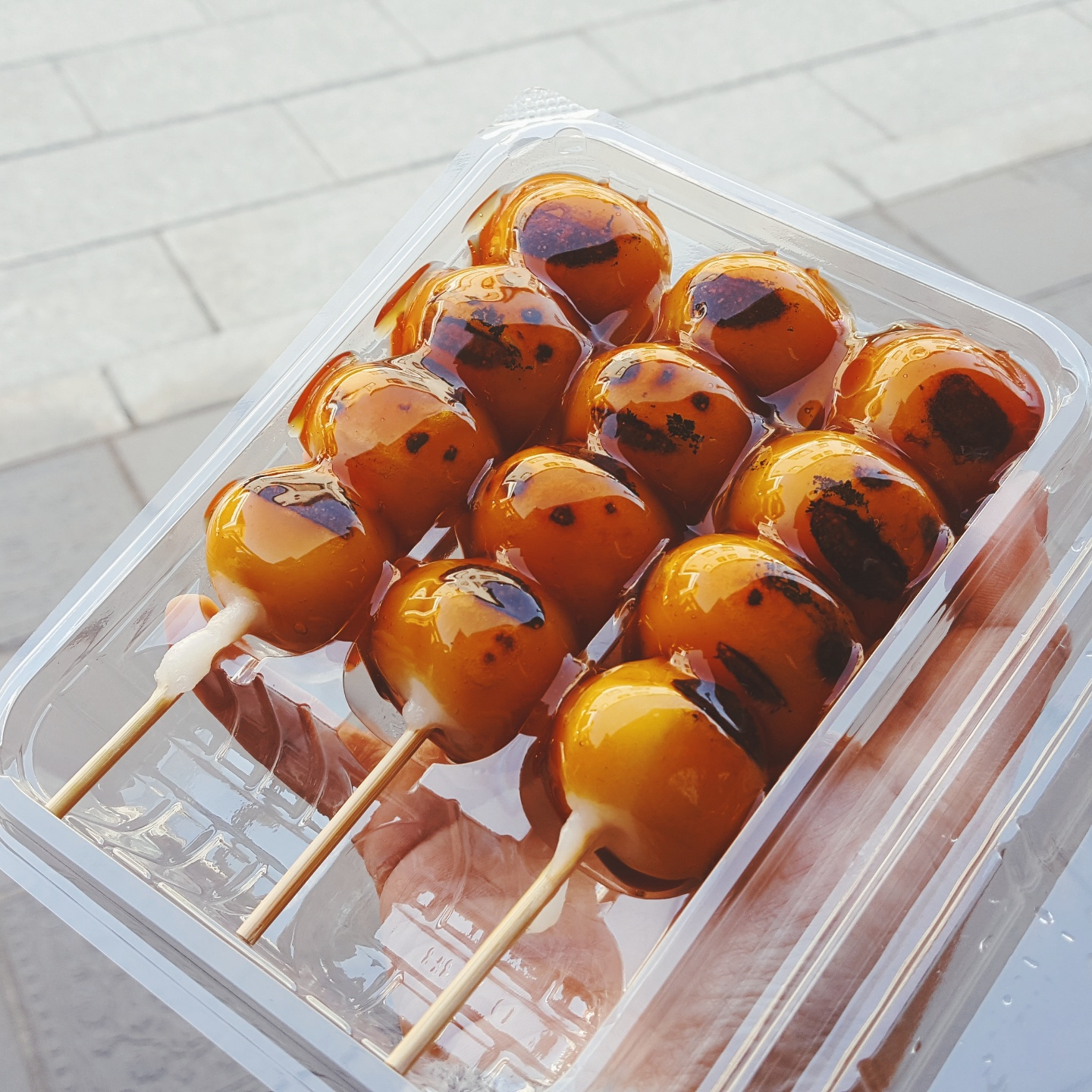

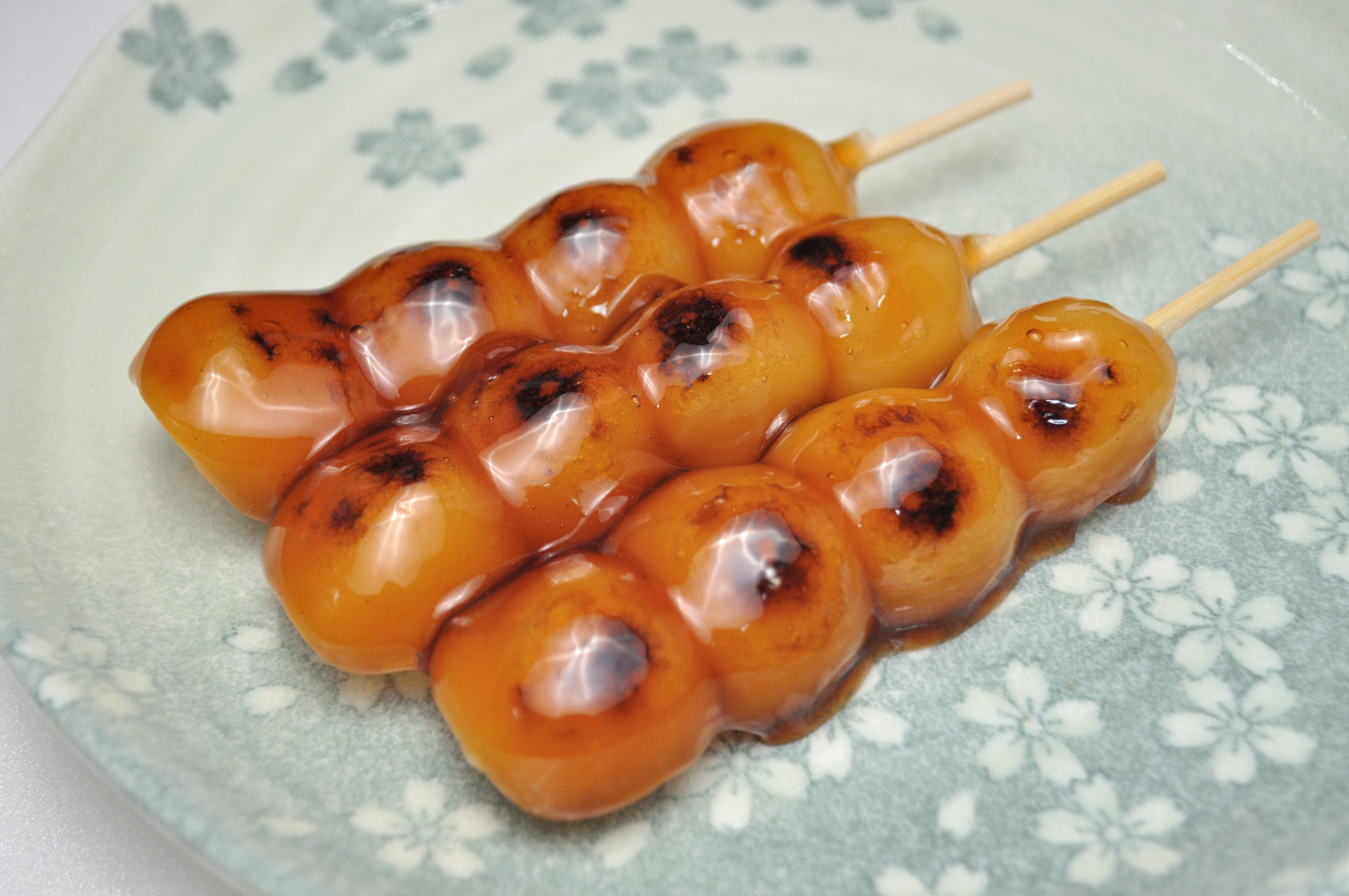

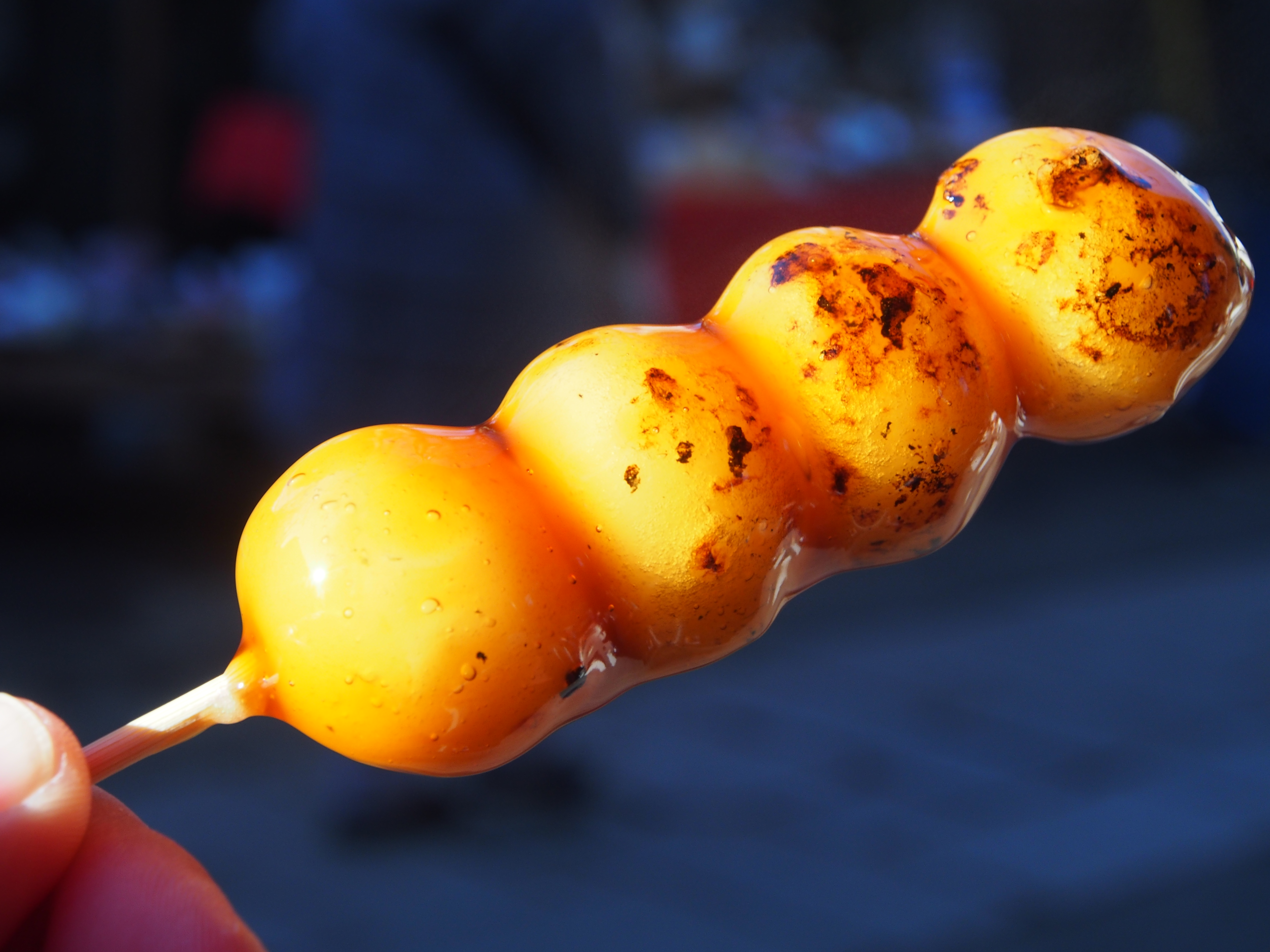

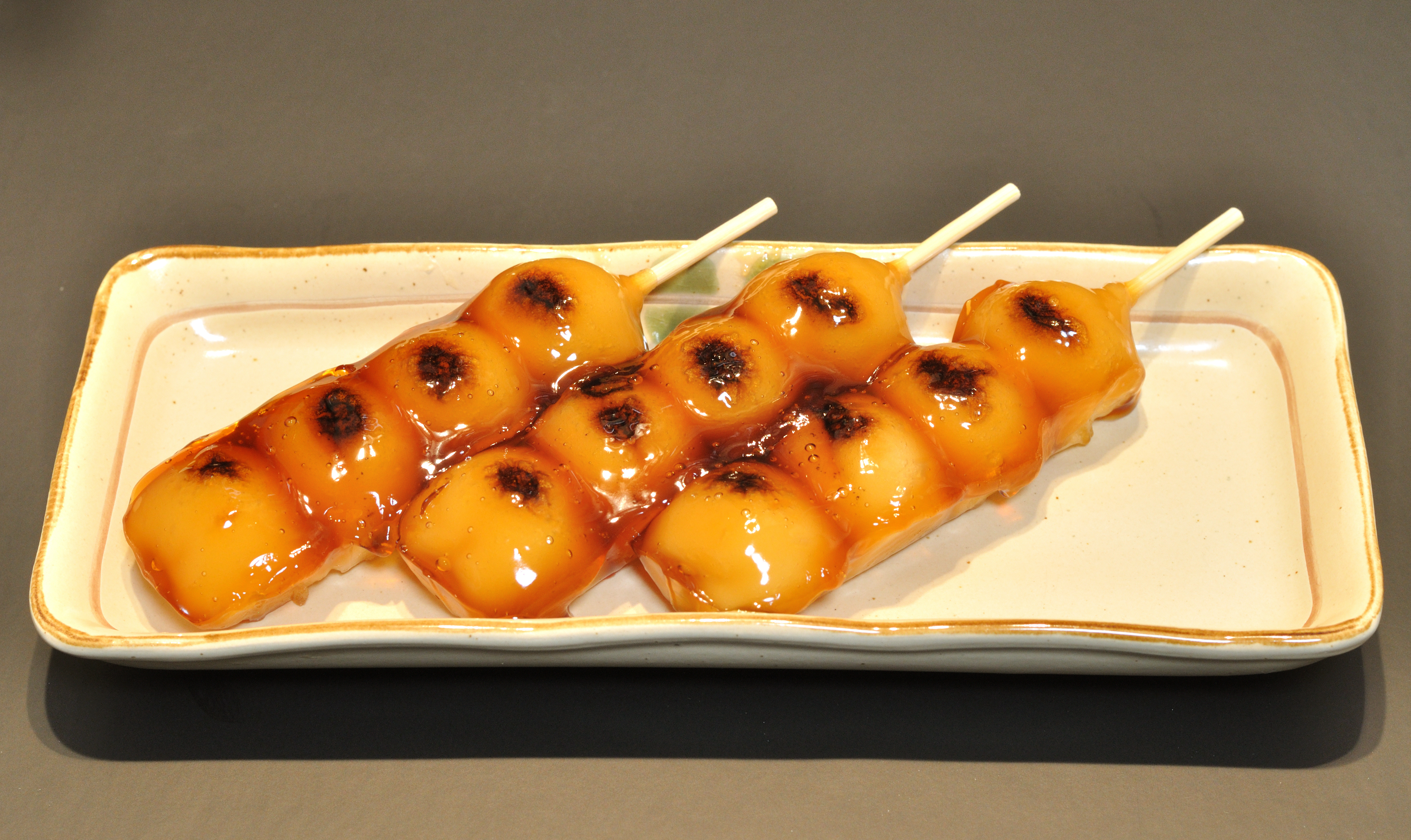
