= Happiness! (video game) =

Japanese adult visual novel

- Happiness! original visual novel cover.

はぴねす! (Hapinesu!)
- Genre: Comedy, Harem, magical
- Video game
- Developer: Windmill
- Publisher: Windmill (Windows); Marvelous Interactive (PS2)
- Genre: Eroge, Visual novel
- Platform: Windows, PlayStation 2
- Released: October 21, 2005
- Novel series
- Written by: Nikaidō Kageyama; Satoshi Mikado; Mutsuki Mizusaki
- Illustrated by: Kocha
- Published by: Harvest
- Original run: April 2006 – July 2008
- Volumes: 7
- Manga
- Written by: Windmill
- Illustrated by: Rino Fujii
- Published by: Media Factory
- Magazine: Monthly Comic Alive
- Original run: August 2006 – June 2007
- Volumes: 2
- Anime television series
- Directed by: Hiroshi Hara
- Produced by: Makoto Itō
- Written by: Satoru Nishizono
- Music by: Toshimichi Isoe
- Studio: Artland
- Licensed by: NA: Maiden Japan
- Original network: Chiba TV, Kids Station, Teletama, TV Aichi, TV Kanagawa, TV Osaka
- Original run: October 5, 2006 – December 21, 2006
- Episodes: 12 + OVA

Happiness! (はぴねす!, Hapinesu!) is a Japanese adult visual novel developed by Windmill released on October 21, 2005, for Windows PCs. The game was later ported to the PlayStation 2. An adult fan disc titled Happiness! Re:Lucks was developed by Windmill's sister brand Windmill Oasis and released on July 28, 2006, for Windows. A manga illustrated by Rino Fujii was serialized in Media Factory's Monthly Comic Alive between 2006 and 2007. A series of novels were published by Harvest between 2006 and 2008. A 12-episode anime produced by Artland aired in Japan between October and December 2006, and an original video animation episode followed in January 2007.

== Plot ==
Happiness! centers around Yūma Kohinata, a high school student attending Mizuhosaka Academy's regular section of the school, and his close friends Jun Watarase and Hachisuke Takamizo. The other section of the school, aptly named the magic section, was founded in order to train mages in the art of using magic. The day after Valentine's Day, a gas explosion at the magic section causes all the mages in training to transfer to the normal section for the time being. Two girls from the magic section, Haruhi Kamisaka and Anri Hiiragi, are placed in Yūma's class. Now Haruhi and her friends must adjust to the transfer into the normal section of Mizuhosaka Academy.

== Characters ==
Yūma Kohinata (小日向 雄真, Kohinata Yūma)
Voiced by: Takashi Ōhara (anime)
Yūma is the main protagonist in the story. He has a nice, helping personality and is not afraid to help girls in need. His two close friends are Hachisuke Takamizo, and Jun Watarase, who seems to have a crush on him. When he was younger he was able to do some magic in order to help Haruhi who was being bullied, but now he professes that he cannot use magic (though in reality he still can). Additionally, he seems to be put off by the notion of using magic whatsoever, even if it is able to help people. Eventually, he realizes that magic can bring happiness if used in the right way and transfers to the magic section. In the end, he learned that his real mother is Suzuri Minagi (a teacher in the magic section). He is actually one of a kind and one of the most powerful and quickest of learners when it comes to magic, although he doesn't use it because of a few accidents when he was younger and because his mother erased his memory when he was young. He eventually started to harbour feelings for Haruhi Kamisaka.

Haruhi Kamisaka (神坂 春姫, Kamisaka Haruhi)
Voiced by: Yui Sakakibara
Haruhi is the main heroine in the story. She is a mage in training and is seen as very skilled amongst her peers, who have been known to think of her as a genius when it comes to using magic. When she was younger, Yūma was able to use some magic in order to help her from some bullies which made her want to become a mage herself. Her magic wand is named soprano (ソプラノ, Sopurano), which owes its form from a trumpet that Haruhi used to play before she started to study magic. She harbours feelings for Yuma Kohinata. She was mistaken by Ibuki Shikimori to be the daughter of "that" woman (the woman who stole the Shikimori treasure) and even tried to control her to break the barrier that seals the treasure in the Shikimori Forest. In the end, she got together with Yuma when he was transferred to the Magic Section.

Anri Hiiragi (柊 杏璃, Hiiragi Anri)
Voiced by: Mia Naruse
Anri is Haruhi's close friend and also a fellow mage in training. She tends to have a very strong-willed type of personality which she uses to try to get the things she wants. It can also make her reckless when it comes to her using magic, due to her being overconfident and underskilled compared to Haruhi. She is left handed according to the seventh anime episode. Her magic wand is named Paella (パエリア, Paeria) and was formed from her favorite feathered pen. She applied for a part-time job as a waitress in the Oasis cafeteria to save some money for her to be able to go abroad and study at a Magic Institution. Eventually, she begins working for Otoha Kohinata in the school's cafeteria.

Koyuki Takamine (高峰 小雪, Takamine Koyuki)
Voiced by: Yura Hinata
Koyuki is a friend of Haruhi and Anri who is one year above them and is also in the magic section. Her magic wand is named Sphere Tom (スフィアタム, Sufia Tamu) though it is also known to be nicknamed "Tama-chan" (タマちゃん). It takes the form of a staff with a small green sphere on the end that floats on the staff. Unlike the other magic wands featured that can speak spiritually, sphere Tom has a face from which to voice its opinions. Koyuki inherited the craft of making "Tama-chan"s and puts a lot of effort not only into their creation but going as far as to remember the order in which she made each one despite them appearing all to be relatively similar in appearance. As this dedication to magic has shown, she seems to be very skilled in her use of magic, especially divination magic or fortune telling.

Ibuki Shikimori (式守 伊吹, Shikimori Ibuki)
Voiced by: Miru (PC), Oma Ichimura (PS2/anime)
Ibuki is a young girl and powerful mage who transfers into Sumomo's class. Most of the time, she is very standoffish and will push people away from her either figuratively or literally, so as to be left alone. Her family is known for being well-advanced in terms of magic, and even at such a young age Ibuki has shown herself to be well skilled as she uses her magic wand named Bisaim (ビサイム, Bisaimu), which takes the form of an umbrella. The Kamijō family has been serving the Shikimori family for generations. This explains why Saya and Shinya Kamijō are always with Ibuki and act as her protectors and followers. She wanted to retrieve the Shikimori treasure for a reason that she wanted to see her sister, Natsumi, who died from sealing the angel demons that came out of the treasure. She mistakenly thought that Haruhi, because of her great skills in using magic, is the daughter of the woman who stole and hid the treasure.

Saya Kamijō (上条 沙耶, Kamijō Saya)
Voiced by: Rina Misaki (PC), Shizuka Itō (PS2/anime)
Saya is a young girl who transfers into Yūma's class along with her twin brother Shinya, who is also a mage. She was initially mistaken for a ghost by Hachisuke after he met up with her one night by chance at school. Her magic wand is named Sanbach (サンバッハ, Sanbahha) and takes the form of a violin bow. They have been serving the Shikimori family for generations. They never knew their mother because she is already dead. The reason is unknown. Their, she and her brother Shinya, wanting to see and meet their mother, urged their father to steal the Shikimori treasure for it was believed to have powers that can bring back the spirit of the dead but it turned into chaos. The treasure was provoked and unleashed the angel demons contained in it. Thus, it must be sealed again. Suzura Minagi, Natsumi Shikimori and Takamine's mother tried to stop it. This however, ends up with Natsumi sacrificing her life to seal it and stop the demons, much to Ibuki's sorrow.

Sumomo Kohinata (小日向 すもも, Kohinata Sumomo)
Voiced by: Oto Agumi (PC), Mai Goto (PS2/anime)
Sumomo is Yūma's younger sister who seems to have an energetic personality. She has known Haruhi since childhood and they used to play together. Due to family circumstances, Sumomo didn't become Yūma's sister until after she had entered elementary school. She has amazing skills in cooking.

Hachisuke Takamizo (高溝 八輔, Takamizo Hachisuke)
Voiced by: Kikutaro Numekawa (PC), Takuo Kawamura (PS2/anime)
Hachisuke, otherwise known simply as Hachi, is one of Yūma's close friends and hangs out with him and Jun Watarase constantly. He seems to be desperate for any affection from girls, as the closest chance he has at getting a girl is with his friend Jun, who, despite his feminine appearance, is in fact male. He is often very perverted as well.

Jun Watarase (渡良瀬 準, Watarase Jun)
Voiced by: Fūri Samoto (PC), Michiru Yuimoto (PS2/anime)
Jun is another of Yūma's close friends. Despite being born male, Jun has a feminine appearance and wears women's clothes. Due to this, girls at Jun's school treat Jun as a girl, and they even allow Jun to change clothes with them. Jun enjoys the attention received from male students. Jun is attracted to men, and has a desire to date Yūma, but Yūma spurns Jun's multiple advances. Jun adores hanging around girls as friends. Jun's signature attack, the Patriot Missile Kick, is a flying side kick, normally used as a means to keep Hachi under control.

Otoha Kohinata (小日向 音羽, Kohinata Otoha)
Voiced by: Tomomi Misaki (PC), Chizuko Hoshino (PS2/anime)
Otoha is the unorthodox mother of Yūma and Sumomo. She runs the school cafeteria called Oasis. Otoha often does not act her age, but rather she acts closer to her daughter's age. She is close friends with Suzura Minagi. This is why Suzuri entrusts her to take care of Yuma.

Shinya Kamijō (上条 信哉, Kamijō Shinya)
Voiced by: Healthy Tarō (PC), Kentarō Itō (PS2/anime)
He is the twin brother of Saya Kamijyo. His family has served Shikimori for every generations. He has a wooden, katana-like magic wand though the name is unknown. One of his defining traits is that he has a horrible sense of direction where he even gets lost walking to school with his sister as they manage to get separated constantly. However, if Saya is in any danger, he instantly knows where she is and runs to her in seconds.

Suzuri Minagi (御薙 鈴莉, Minagi Suzuri)
Voiced by: Hitomi
She is the biological mother of Yūma Kohinata. She is a teacher in the magical section. She was forced to entrust her son, Yuma, to her close friend, Otoha, because of many tragic things that had happened. She erased Yuma's memory of her before going separate ways. She revealed the whole story to Haruhi and Anri of what had happened in the past.

== Development and release ==
Happiness! is the sixth title developed by the visual novel developer Windmill. The project's planning was headed by Kocha and Chatora, who also served as the director. The scenario was written by four people: Chatora, Celery, Kei Watanabe and Ayaka. The art director and character design was provided by Kocha, and the super deformed illustrations were done by Yui Haga. The music in the game was composed by members of Elements Garden and OdiakeS under the name Ecnemuse.

Happiness! was released in Japan on October 21, 2005, as a limited-edition version, playable only on Windows PCs as a DVD; the regular edition was released on November 18, 2005. The limited edition came bundled with an illustration booklet and the game's original soundtrack. A fan disc titled Happiness! Re:Lucks was released on July 28, 2006, as a limited-edition version playable on a Windows PC as a DVD; the regular edition was released on September 15, 2006. Developed by Windmill's sister brand Windmill Oasis, the staff for Re:Lucks was largely the same as the original game, except for the scenario staff, which was divided between Chatora, Celery, Eiji Takashima, Hare Kitagawa and Kei Hozumi. Happiness! was ported to the PlayStation 2 by Marvelous Interactive under the title Happiness! De:Luxe on January 25, 2007.

== Adaptations ==
=== Novels ===
Harvest published seven novels based on Happiness! from April 2006 to July 2008. The first two were written by Nikaidō Kageyama, the next four were written by Satoshi Mikado, and the last was written by Mutsuki Mizusaki.

=== Manga ===
A manga adaptation, illustrated by Rino Fujii, was serialized in Media Factory's Monthly Comic Alive magazine between the August 2006 and June 2007 issues. Two tankōbon volumes were released: the first on December 22, 2006, and the second on May 23, 2007.

=== Anime ===
A 12-episode anime adaptation written by Satoru Nishizono, directed by Hiroshi Hara, and produced by Artland, aired on Japan television between October 5 and December 21, 2006. On January 25, 2007, an original video animation (OVA) episode was released with the first print limited edition of Happiness! De:Luxe. Two pieces of theme music are used for the anime: one opening theme and one ending theme. The opening theme is "Happiness!" by Ayumi Murata, and the ending theme is "Magical Generation" by Yui Sakakibara. The anime's original soundtrack was released on November 22, 2006, in Japan, published by Media Factory. It was released on DVD in Japan from December 5, 2006, to May 25, 2007. Maiden Japan licensed the series and released the complete series on DVD on April 1, 2014.

No.	Title	Original release date
1	"Valentine"; Transliteration: "Barentain" (Japanese: バレンタイン)	October 5, 2006
Haruhi Kamisaka is one of the mages in training at Mizuhosaka Academy who on Valentine's Day, runs into Yūma Kohinata, who she believes may be a boy she's been trying to find for years. After the magic section of the academy suffers from a gas explosion, Haruhi and her friends transfer over to the normal section and Haruhi ends up in Yūma's class.
2	"Cherry Blossom Viewing"; Transliteration: "Ohanami" (Japanese: お花見)	October 12, 2006
A new school year has begun and the upperclassmen prepare for the entrance ceremony. Of the new students, Sumomo, Yūma's sister, is entering as a first year student. Later, Haruhi and Anri are invited by Yūma and his friends to participate in the cherry blossom viewing with them occurring the following Sunday.
3	"Oasis"; Transliteration: "Oashisu" (Japanese: オアシス)	October 19, 2006
The students aren't coming to the school cafeteria as often as they used to and Anri begins working as a waitress in order to bring in business. However, complications arise.
4	"The Vanished Tama-chan"; Transliteration: "Kieta Tama-chan" (Japanese: 消えたタマちゃん)	October 26, 2006
Tama-chan, Koyuki's magical wand, starts to feel that he's not very important compared to the other thousand similar Tama-chan's Koyuki has made. Tama-chan leaves Koyuki for a time because he is in doubt of her feelings towards the Tama-chans she has made.
5	"The Beautiful Girl at Midnight"; Transliteration: "Mayonaka no Bishōjo" (Japanese: 真夜中の美少女)	November 2, 2006
Hachisuke thinks he has found a beautiful female ghost at school and promises to "send her to heaven." Upon revealing this knowledge to his friends, they all go with him to school at night to find out if what he saw really was a ghost and if there's anything they can do about it.
6	"The Mysterious Transfer Student"; Transliteration: "Nazo no Tenkōsei" (Japanese: 謎の転校生)	November 9, 2006
A new female student named Ibuki Shikimori transfers into Sumomo's class, though is cold towards everyone and thus has no friends. Sumomo, feeling bad for her, tries very hard to become her friend.
7	"The Plan to Convert Ibuki into a Friend"; Transliteration: "Ibuki Tomodachika Keikaku" (Japanese: 伊吹友達化計画)	November 16, 2006
In an attempt to make Ibuki more friendlier towards others, Haruhi and her friends think up ways that they can spend time together with Ibuki, such as eating lunch together, playing games together, or going out bowling together. At the end of the day, Ibuki starts to view the others as friends.
8	"Summer Expectations"; Transliteration: "Natsu no Omowaku" (Japanese: 夏の思惑)	November 23, 2006
Yūma and his friends get the chance to go to the school's practice area away in the mountains, but they are just using it for a light vacation during the summer. While there, Yūma and Haruhi become closer and start addressing each other by their given names.
9	"School Festival"; Transliteration: "Gakuensai" (Japanese: 学園祭)	November 30, 2006
The school festival has arrived, and all the students are getting prepared. Near the end of the festival, Ibuki takes Yūma captive, and attempts to force Haruhi to give up the secret to break the barrier on Shikimori Forest.
10	"The Past"; Transliteration: "Kako" (Japanese: 過去)	December 7, 2006
Sumomo has been affected by a spell from the fight between Haruhi and Ibuki at the school festival, and is unconscious. Yuma's past is revealed to Haruhi and Anri along with a related event that caused the death of Ibuki's older sister.
11	"The Shikimori Treasure"; Transliteration: "Shikimori no Hihō" (Japanese: 式守の秘宝)	December 14, 2006
Yūma's biological mother starts to help Sumomo's condition, but in the meantime Ibuki goes within the barrier in Shikimori Forest to obtain the Shikimori Treasure. Meanwhile, Jun takes Yūma to the aquarium to cheer him up, but Yūma leaves when Jun is not looking.
12	"The Magic of Happiness"; Transliteration: "Shiawase no Mahō" (Japanese: 幸せの魔法)	December 21, 2006
Demons appear in the forest and the mages try to stop them. Yūma's power is needed to stop the Shikomori Treasure, the source of the demons, but he firmly believes that magic only brings unhappiness. Haruhi tells Yūma that she was the girl saved by his magic in the past, and that magic can also be a source of happiness if used correctly. Haruhi then proceeds to kiss Yūma. Afterwards, Yūma uses the flute and seals the monsters away once more. In the end, Yūma transfers to the magic section and is now together with Haruhi.
OVA	"The Brilliant Day of Jun Watarase"; Transliteration: "Watarase Jun no Kareinaru Ichinichi" (Japanese: 渡良瀬準の華麗なる一日)	January 25, 2007
By mixing several different magic spells, Jun Watarase is transformed into a biological girl via magic, and starts to experience an unusual spike in popularity from the boys at school. Due to Jun's transformation, she has more charm and attraction than any of the other girls, which makes all the boys lose their senses. The boys then begin chasing after her, asking for a kiss.

== Music ==
The opening theme of the Happiness! visual novel is "Zero" by Hiromi Satō, and the ending theme is "Mezame no Asa" by the voice actresses of the four main heroines (Yui Sakakibara, Mia Naruse, Yura Hinata and Oto Agumi), performing under the name Happiness! Heroines. The opening theme of Happiness! Re:Lucks is "Happi-day♪" by Yui Sakakibara, and the ending theme is "With You..." by Hiromi Satō. The opening theme of Happiness! De:Luxe is "Happiness Hōteishiki" by Yui Sakakibara, and the ending theme is "Ohayō" by Ayumi Murata.

== Reception ==
In a 2007 survey of Dengeki G's Magazine readers, Happiness! ranked 38th in a list of "the most interesting bishōjo games"; a five-way tie with Tokimeki Memorial 2, Tsukihime, Welcome to Pia Carrot G.O. and YU-NO: A girl who chants love at the bound of this world.
