= Rino Fujii =

Japanese manga artist

Rino Fujii (藤井理乃, Fujii Rino; born June 6) is a Japanese manga illustrator from Aichi Prefecture. He has mainly participated in manga anthologies based from bishōjo games. As of June 2007, he has been illustrating the third Clannad manga adaptation.

== Works ==
- Happiness!
- Lamune
- Official Another Story Clannad: Hikari Mimamoru Sakamichi de (manga version)
