= Dango =

Japanese ricecake

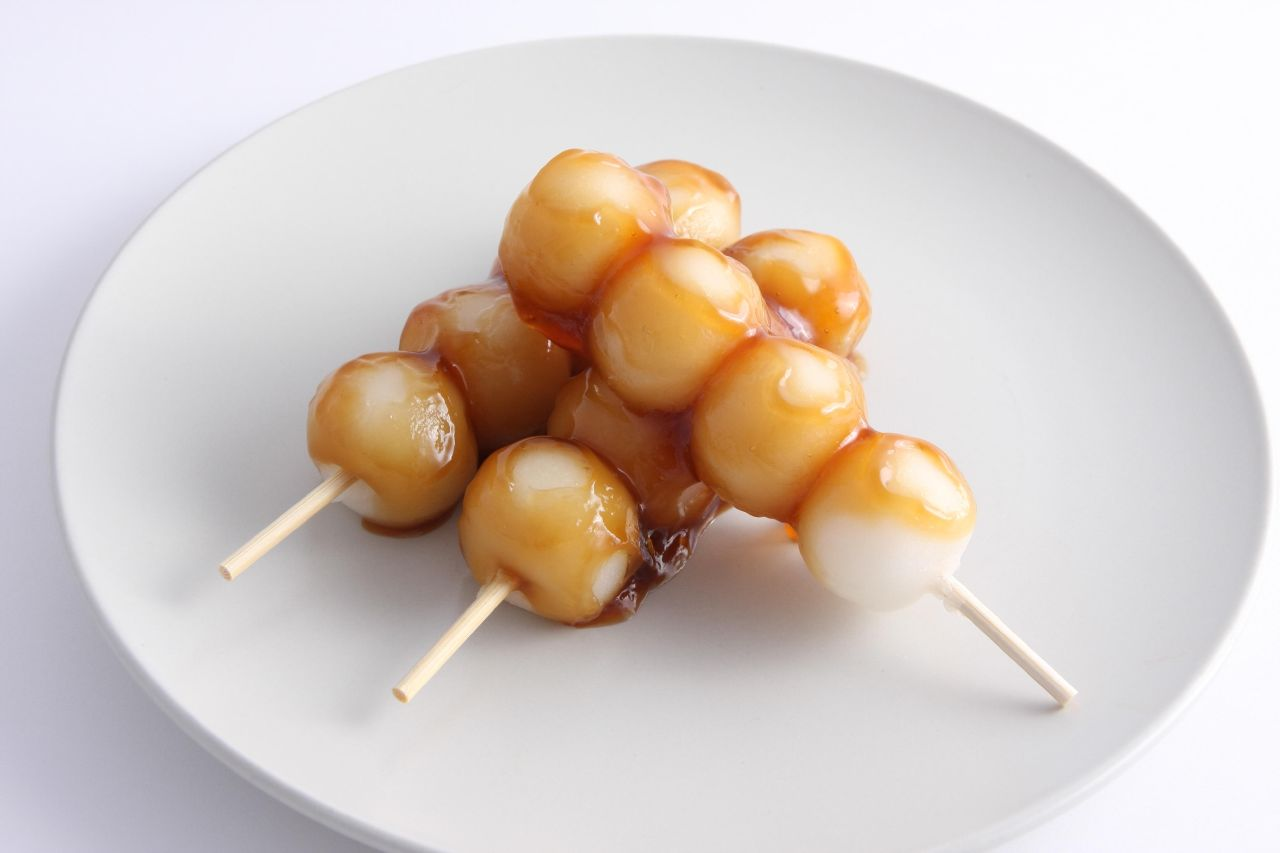
- Mitarashi dango
- Type: Sweets, Dumpling
- Place of origin: Japan
- Main ingredients: Rice flour

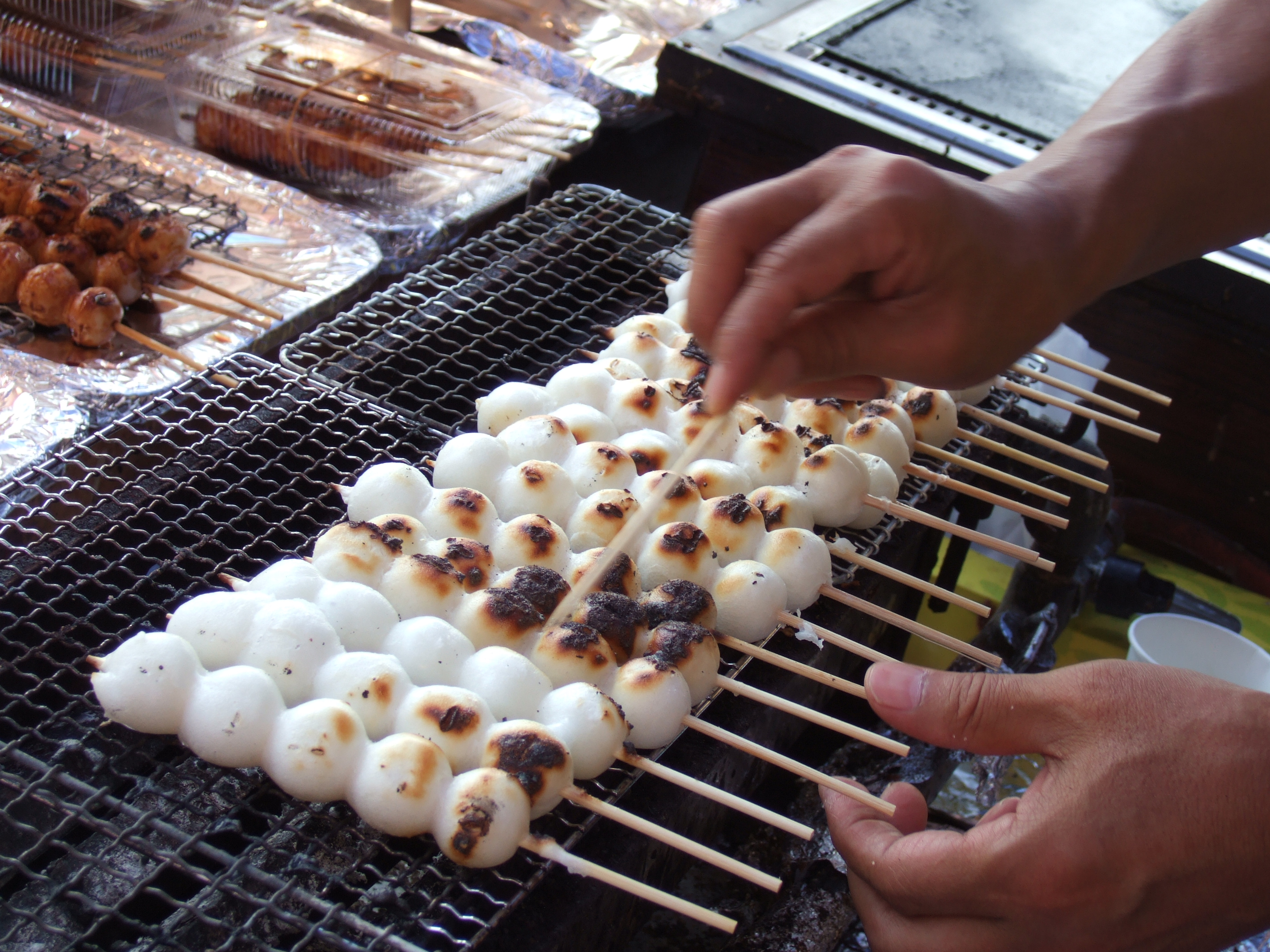
Yaki dango being prepared

Dango (団子) is a Japanese dumpling made with regular rice flour and glutinous rice flour. They are usually made in round shapes, and three to five pieces are served on a skewer, which is called kushi-dango (串団子). The pieces are eaten with sugar, syrup, red bean paste, and other sweeteners. Generally, dango falls under the category of wagashi (Japanese confectionery), and is often served with green tea. It is eaten year-round, but the different varieties are traditionally eaten in given seasons. Dango is sometimes compared with mochi, but is different in that mochi is generally made only with glutinous rice.

== Types ==
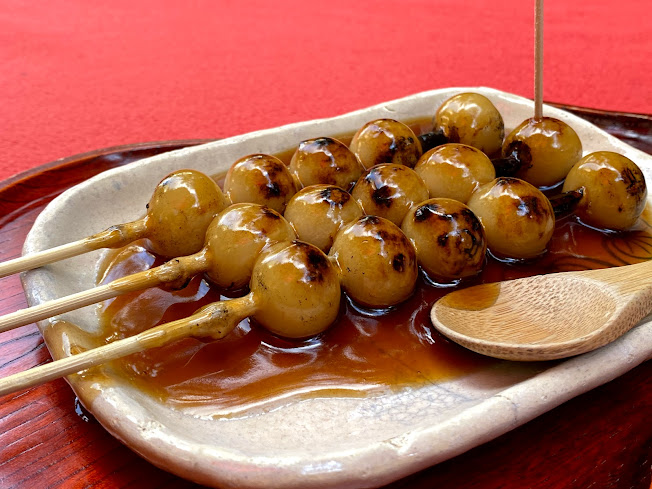
Mitarashi dango, covered with sugar and soy sauce

The many different varieties of dango are usually named after the various seasonings served on or with it.

=== Popular dango ===
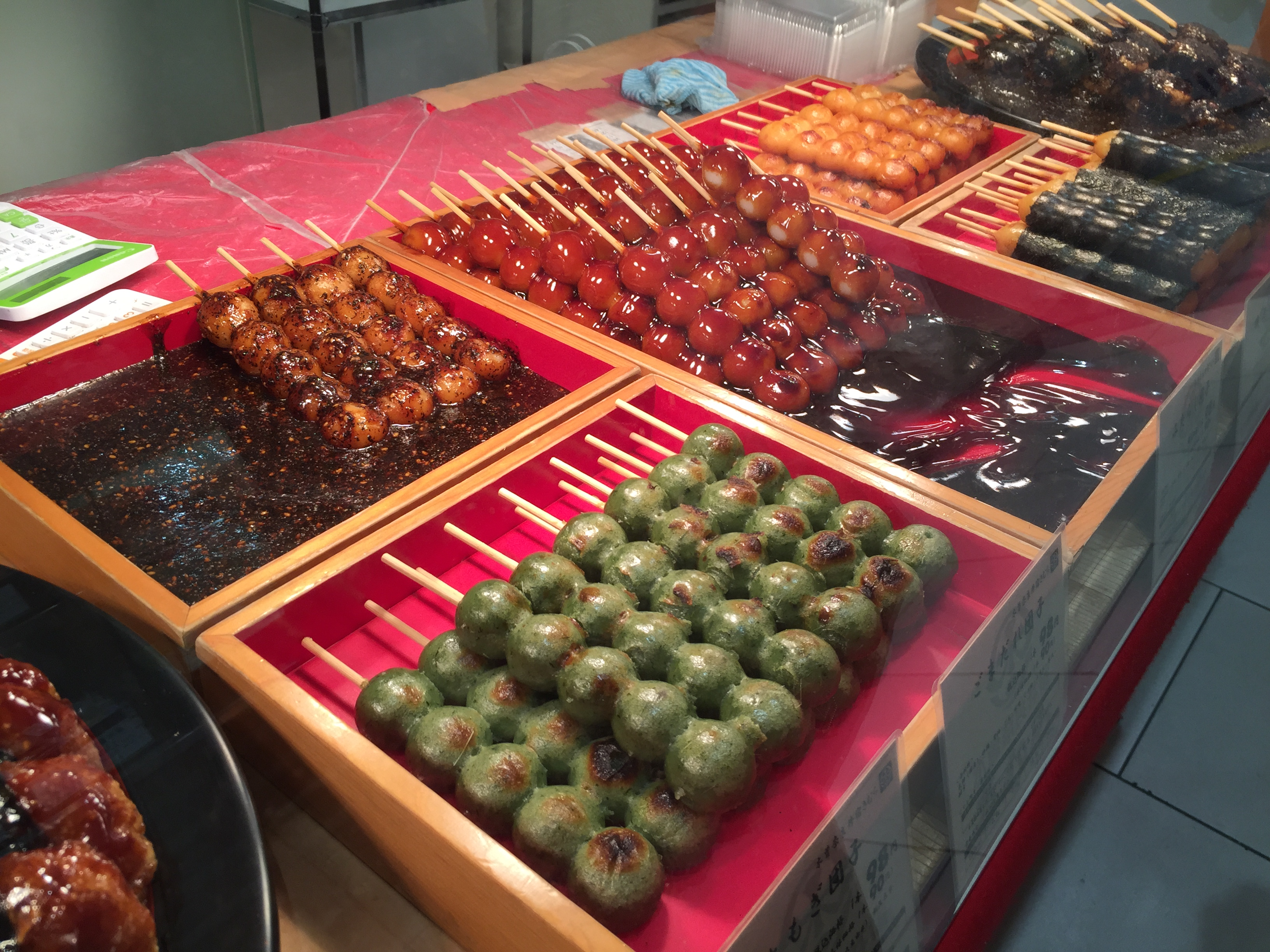
Various dango being sold at a store

Walnut-miso dango being prepared over a charcoal fire on Mount Takao, 2024

- Anko dango (あんこ団子) is commonly covered with sweetened red bean paste; ingredients other than azuki are used on rare occasions. Other toppings for anko include zunda (ずんだ) made from edamame paste and kurumi (walnut) paste.
- Cha dango (茶団子) is green tea (matcha) flavored dango.
- Shoyu dango (醤油だんご) is a kind of baked dango (yaki dango (焼き団子)) and is seasoned with soy sauce. Furthermore, the one wrapped with nori is called isobe dango (磯辺団子).
- Hanami dango (花見だんご) also known as sanshoku dango (三色団子) is eaten during hanami. It has three colors (pink, white and green), and is traditionally made during sakura-viewing season, hence the name (hanami means "flower viewing"; hana meaning "flower", and mi meaning "to see"). The order of the three colored dumplings is said to represent the order in which cherry blossoms bloom. Pink represents cherry buds, white represents cherry blossoms in full bloom, and green represents leafy cherry blossoms after they have fallen. This one was chosen for the Dango Unicode emoji (🍡).
- Kibi dango (きび団子) is made with millet flour. This variety is prominently featured in the tale of Momotarō, a folkloric Japanese hero, who offers the rounded ball (not skewered) to three talking animals in exchange for their aid in fighting demons.
- Kinako dango (きなこ団子) is made with toasted soy flour.
- Kusa dango or yomogi dango (草団子 or よもぎ団子) is mixed leaves of yomogi, like kusa mochi. It is often covered with anko.
- Mitarashi dango (みたらし団子) is covered with a syrup made from shouyu (soy sauce), sugar, and starch.
- Sasa dango (笹団子) is produced and eaten primarily in Niigata Prefecture. Sasa dango has two varieties: onna dango and otoko dango. Onna dango (literally "female dango") is filled with anko, while the otoko dango (literally "male dango") is filled with kinpira. The dango is wrapped in leaves of sasa for the purpose of preservation.
- Shiratama dango (白玉だんご) is eaten in anmitsu or mitsumame.
- Tsukimi dango (月見だんご) is a white dango eaten during Tsukimi, related to the Mid-Autumn festival.

=== Various other dango ===
- Botchan dango (坊っちゃん団子) has three colors. One is colored by red beans, the second by eggs, and the third by green tea. Botchan dango is a product name of Ehime’s miyagegashi, which was named after Natsume Sōseki’s novel Botchan.
- Chichi dango (乳団子) is a slightly sweet, light treat usually eaten as a dessert.
- Denpun dango (でんぷん団子) from Hokkaido is made from potato flour and baked with sweet boiled beans.
- Kuri dango (栗だんご) is coated in chestnut paste.
- Niku dango (肉団子) is a type of Japanese meatball. Chicken niku dango is called tsukune, served on a skewer.
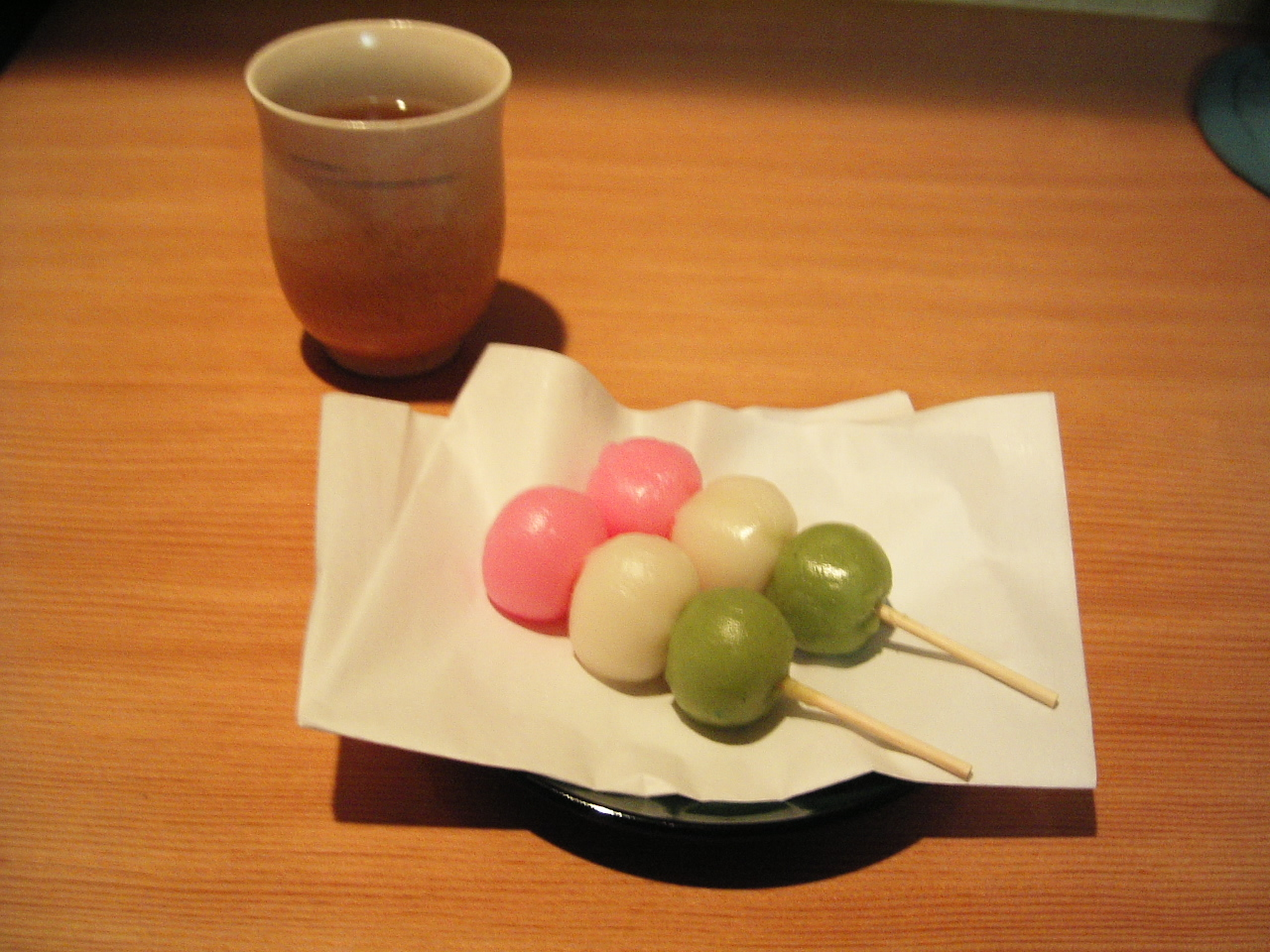
Hanami dango

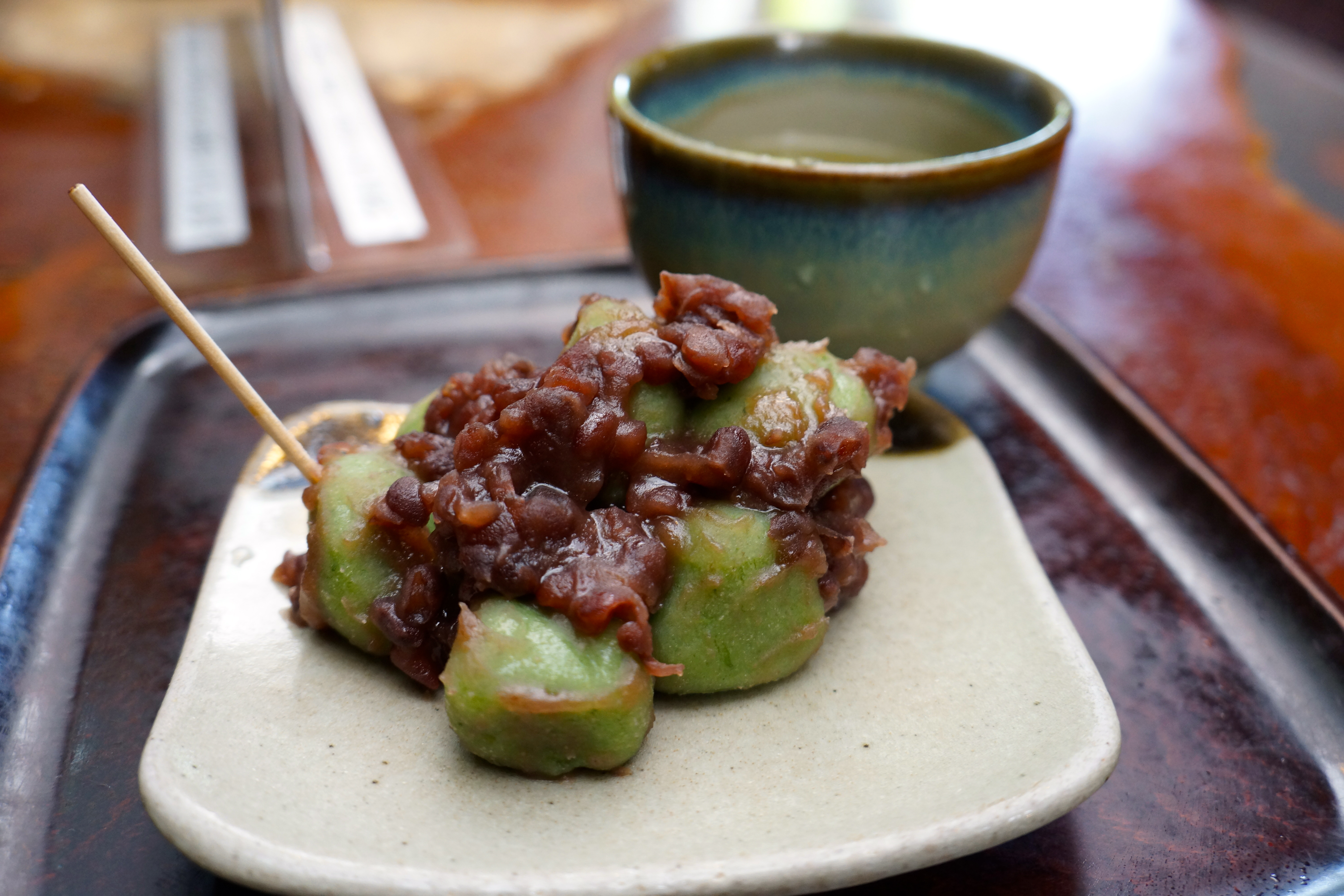
Kusa dango

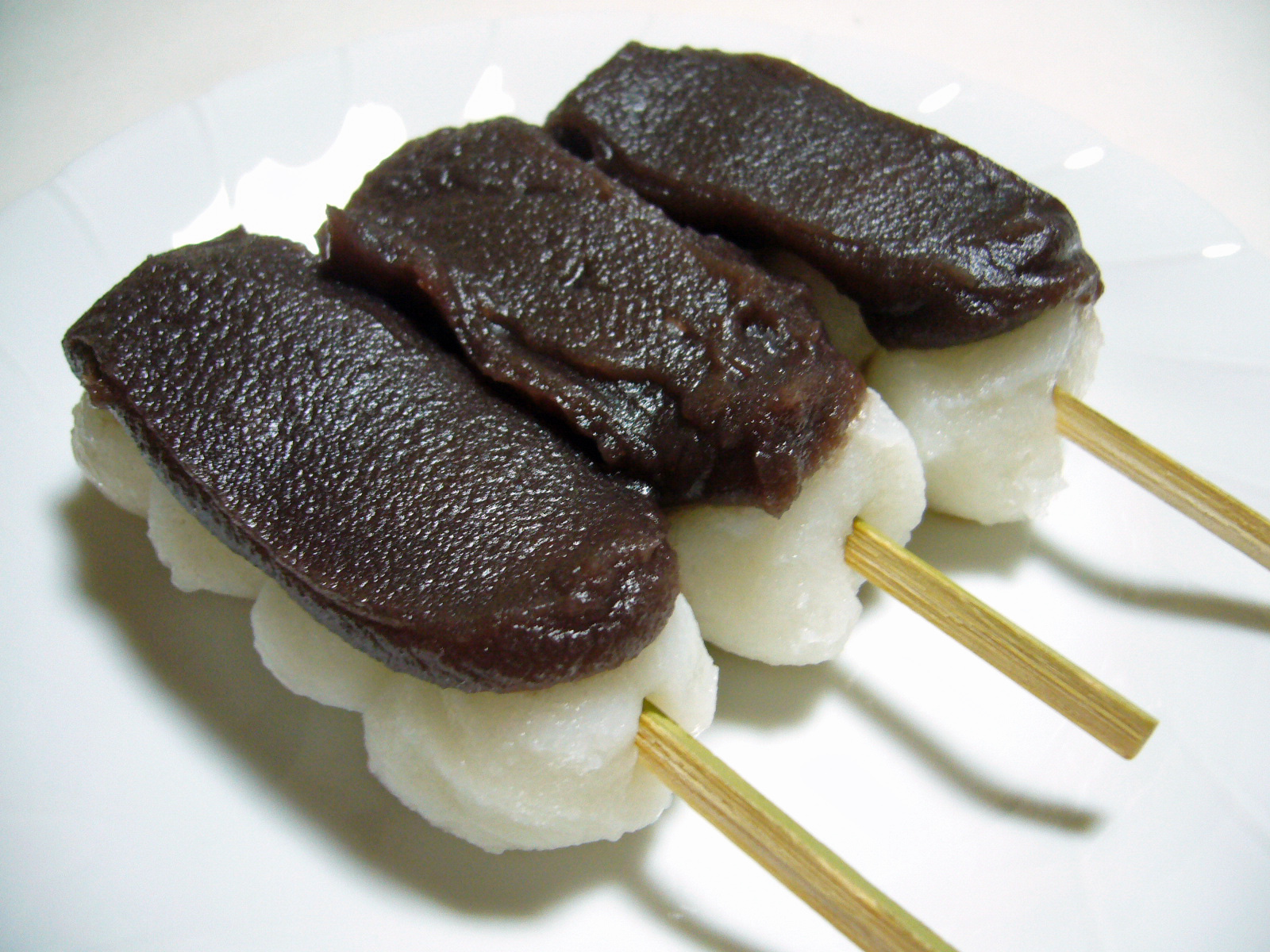
Anko dango

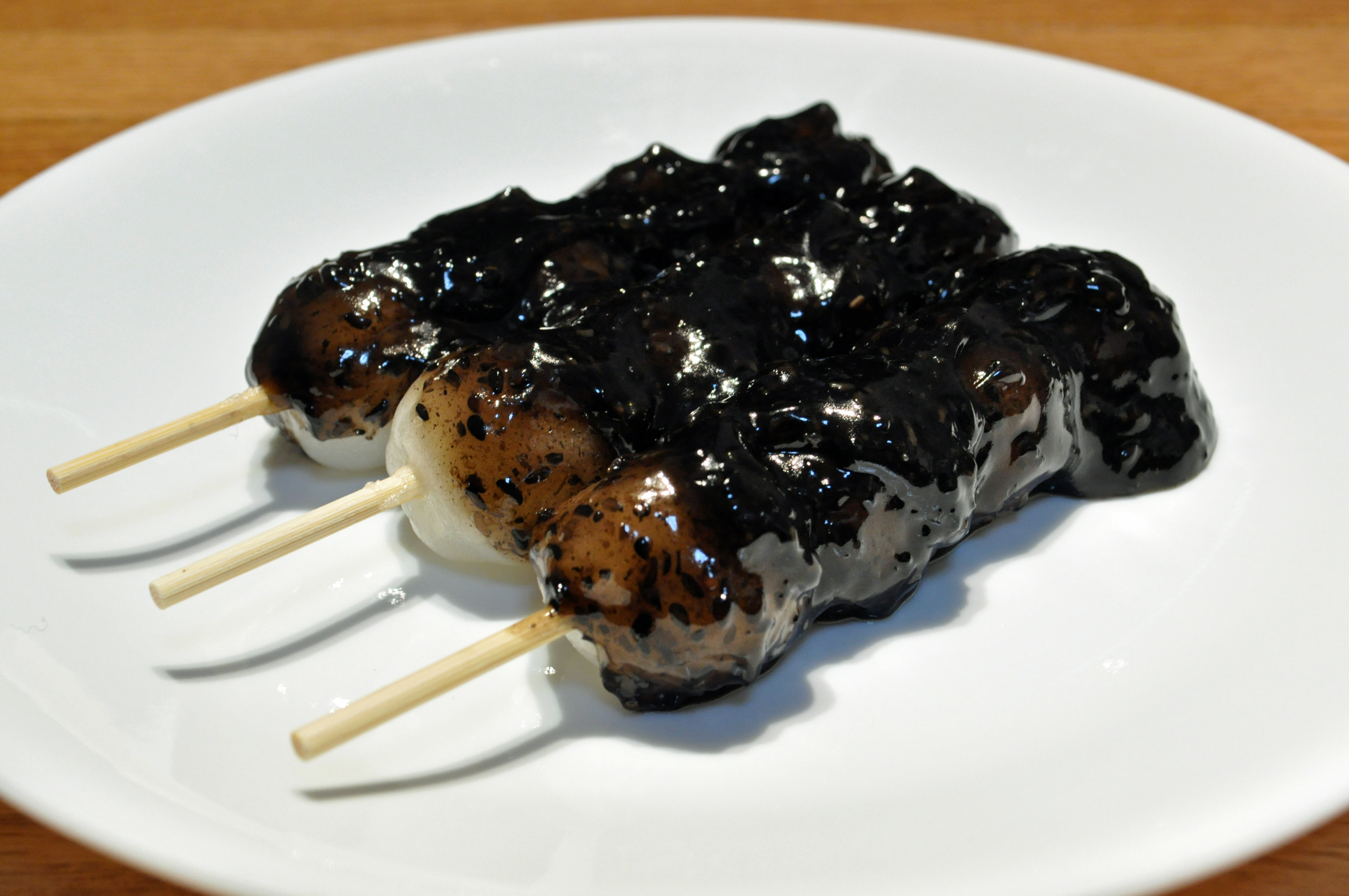
Goma dango

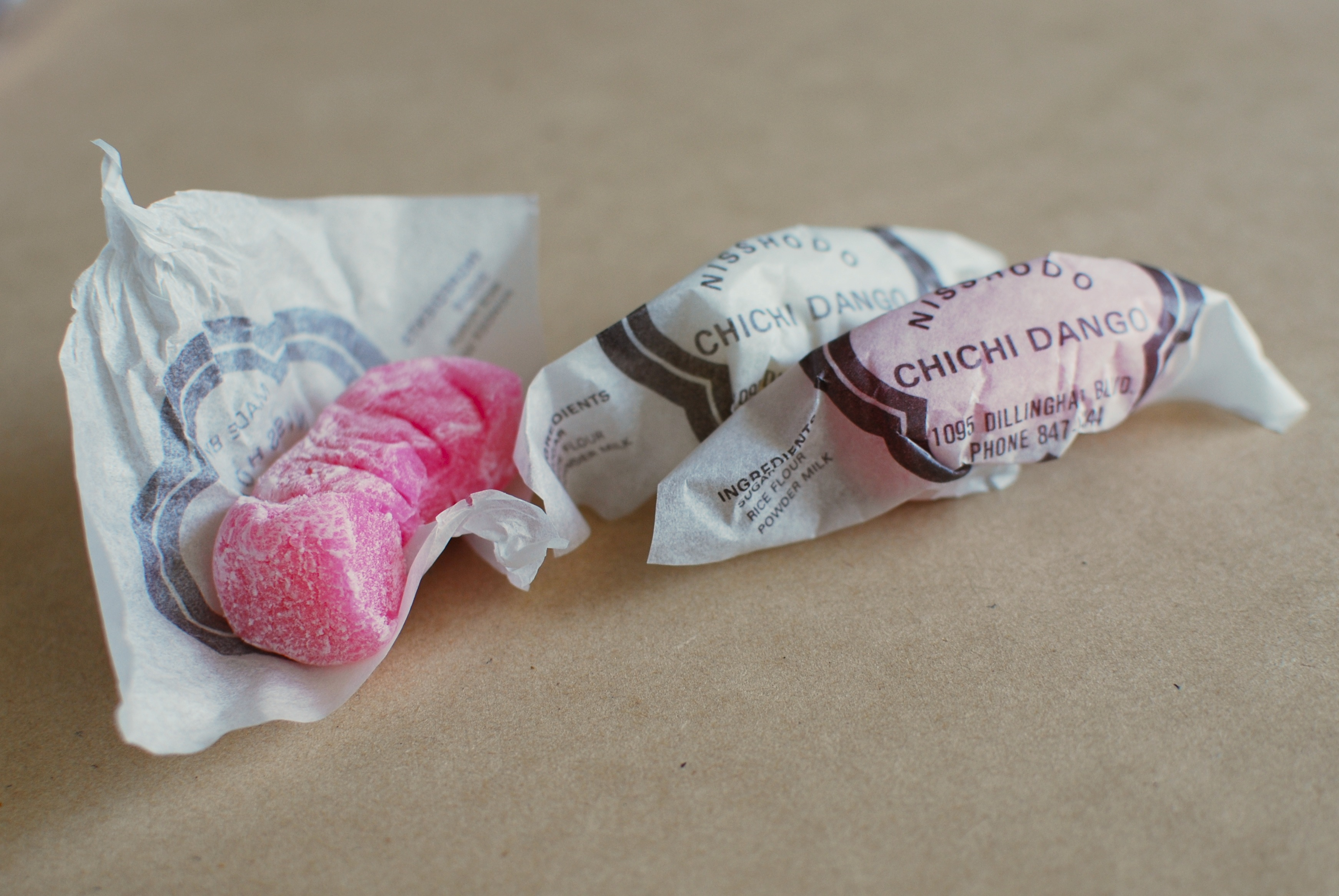
Chichi dango

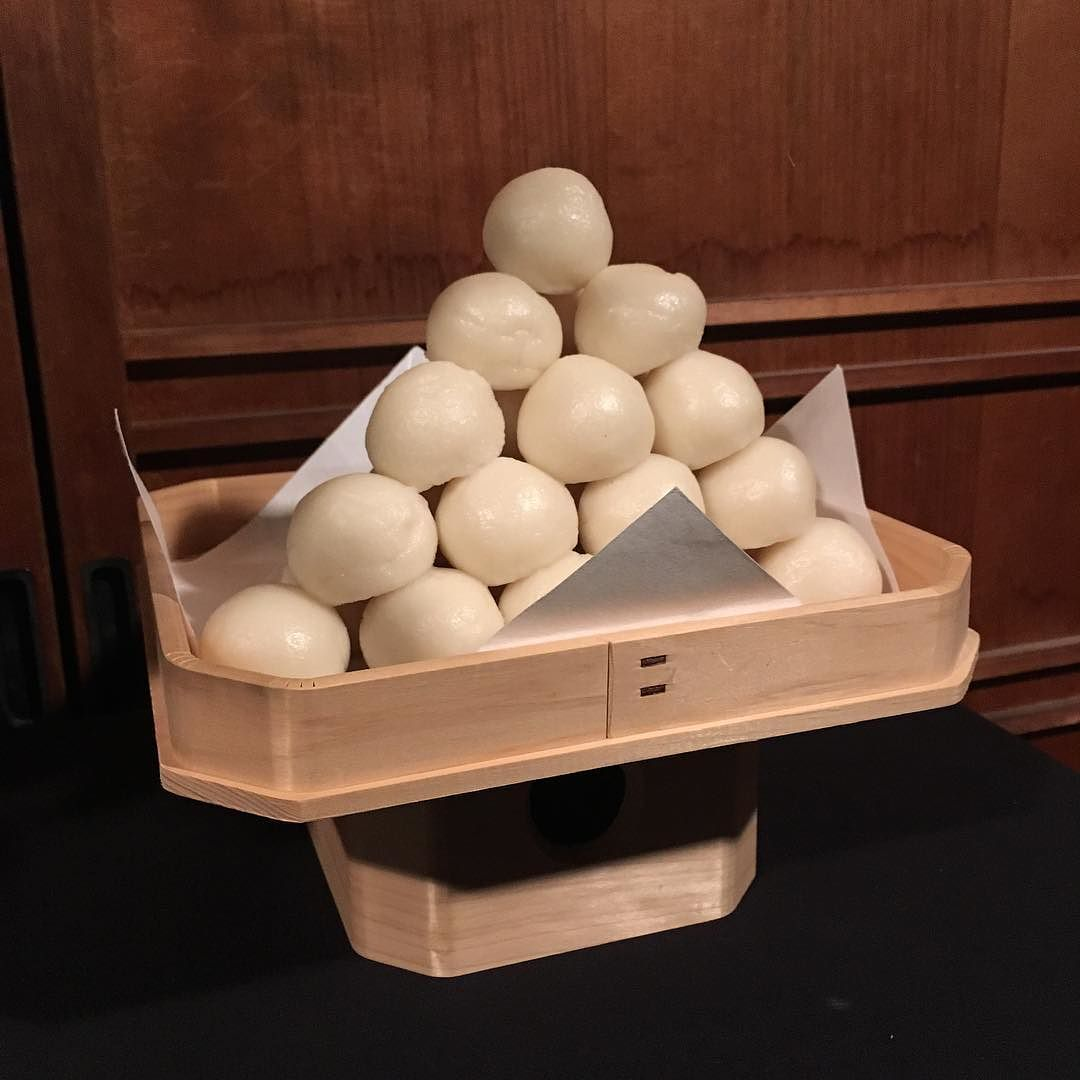
Tsukimi dango

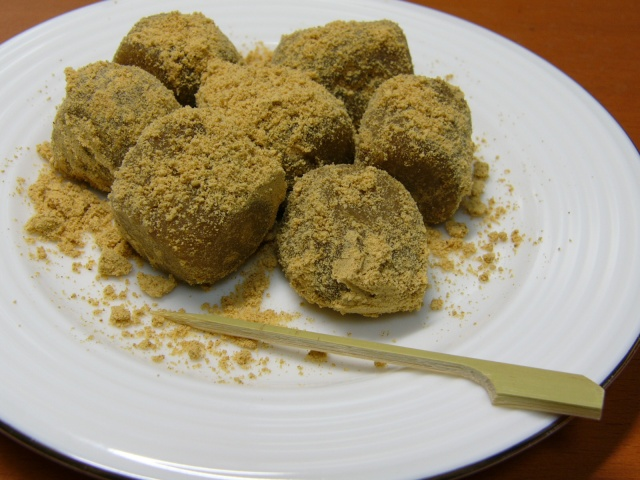
Kinako dango

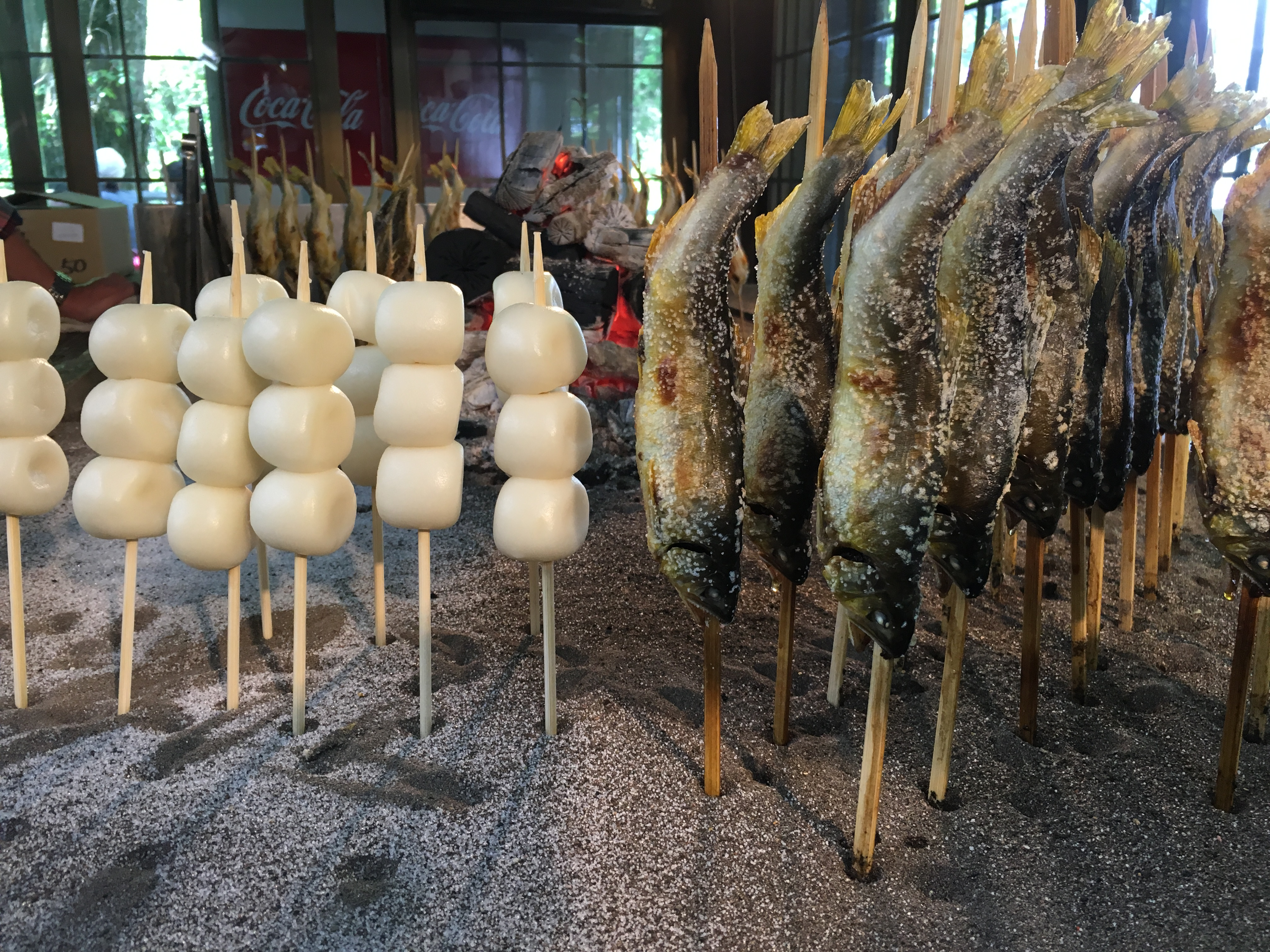
Roasted with fish

== Derived terms ==
A common Japanese proverb "hana yori dango" (花より団子; literally, "dango rather than flowers") refers to a preference for practical things rather than aesthetics.

A hairstyle consisting of dango-like buns on either side of the head is sometimes known as odango.

Dorodango is a Japanese art form in which earth and water are molded to create a delicate, shiny sphere, resembling a billiard ball.

== In Vietnam ==
Bánh hòn is a specialty dessert of Phan Thiet. The cake is made from tapioca flour, coconut, roasted peanuts, salt and sugar. When finished, it is rolled over shredded coconut and skewered like Japanese dango.

== Unicode character ==
The Unicode emoji character 🍡 is used to resemble hanami dango. The character was introduced in October 2010.

== See also ==
- Jian dui
- Wagashi, traditional Japanese confectionery
- Tanghulu, a similar Chinese desert, with fruit instead of dough
