= Mitsumame =

Japanese dessert

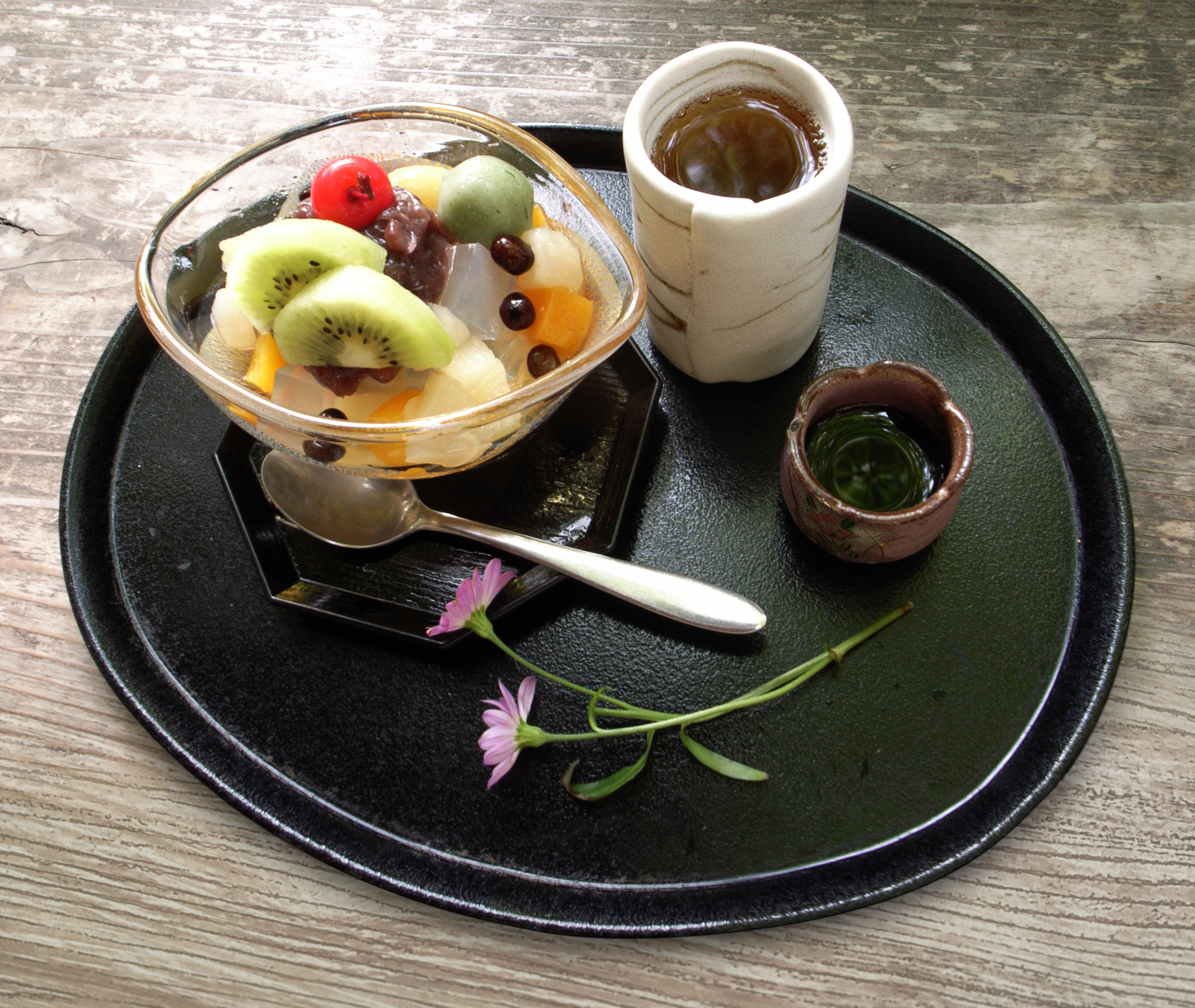
- Course: Dessert
- Place of origin: Japan
- Main ingredients: Agar jelly, kuromitsu (or honey), water (or fruit juice), red field peas (or azuki beans), fruit
- Variations: Anmitsu, mamekan, coffee mitsumame

Mitsumame (みつまめ) is a Japanese dessert. It is made of small cubes of agar jelly, a white translucent jelly made from red algae or seaweed. The agar is dissolved with water (or fruit juice such as apple juice) to make the jelly. It is served in a bowl with boiled red field peas (or sometimes azuki beans), often gyūhi, Shiratama dango and a variety of fruits such as peach slices, mikan, pieces of pineapples, and cherries. The mitsumame usually comes with a small pot of sweet black syrup, kuromitsu, which one pours onto the jelly before eating. Mitsumame is usually eaten with a spoon and fork.

== Variations ==
A few variations on this dessert exist. Anmitsu is mitsumame with bean paste, the an meaning the sweet azuki bean paste or anko. Mamekan is mitsumame without fruits. Cream mitsumame is mitsumame with ice cream on top. Fruits mitsumame is mitsumame with fruits. Coffee mitsumame is mitsumame with coffee jelly.

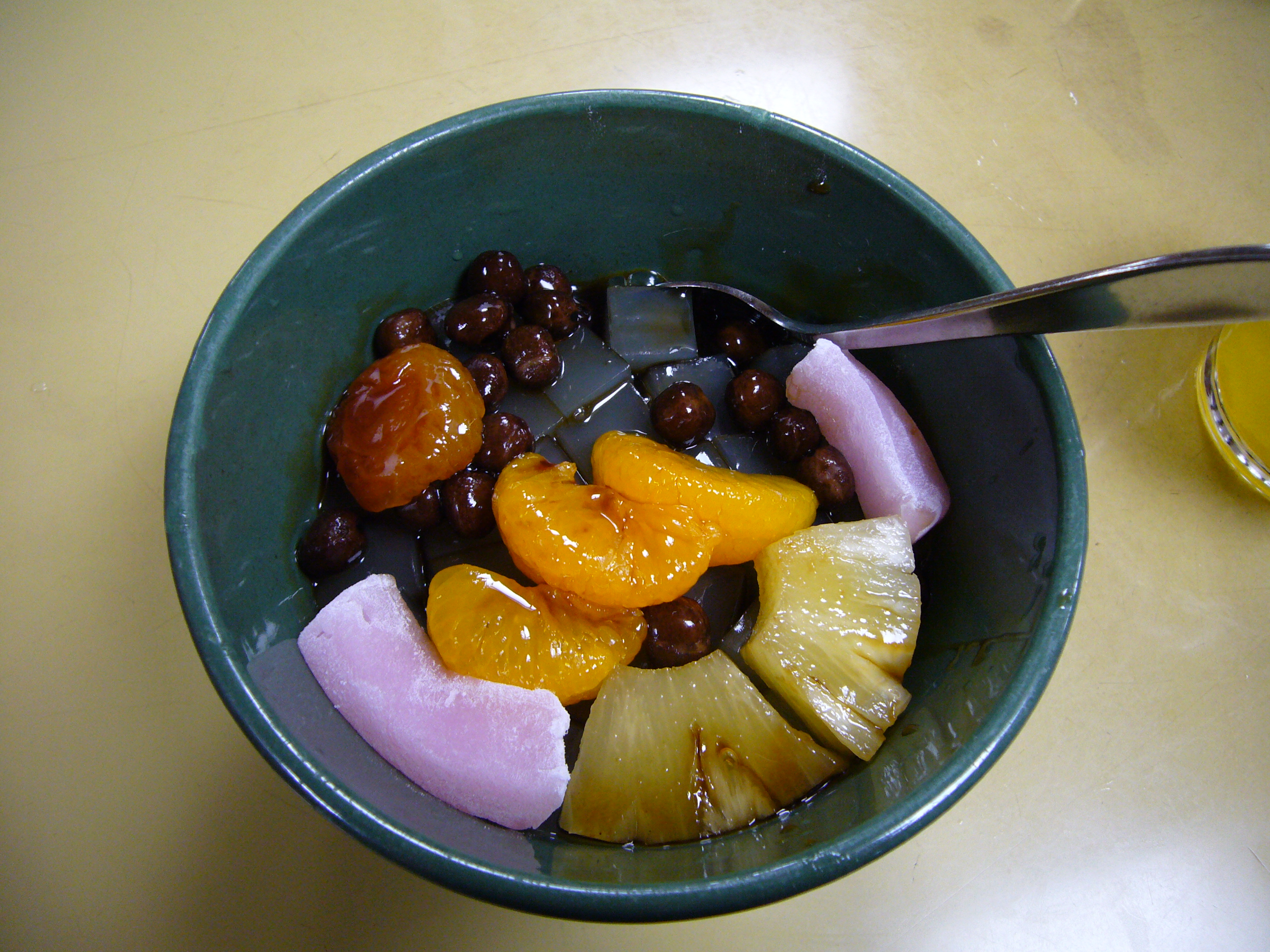

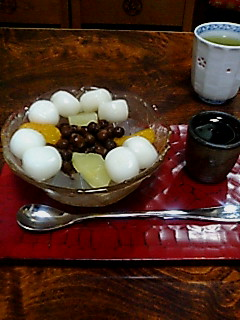

== History ==
The prototype of mitsumame is a dessert for children sold to the end of the Edo era. The present type originated in 1903. Anmitsu originated in 1930.
