= Anmitsu =

Japanese dessert

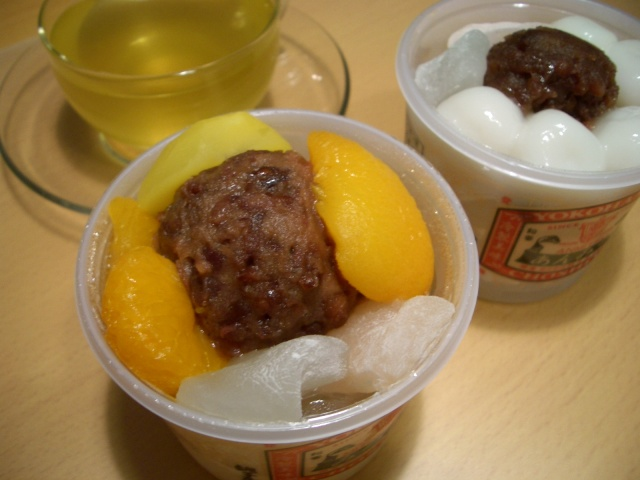
- Course: Dessert
- Place of origin: Japan
- Main ingredients: Red algae or seaweed, water or fruit juice
- Variations: Mitsumame, cream anmitsu

Anmitsu (あんみつ, rarely 餡蜜) is a wagashi (Japanese dessert) that dates to the Meiji era.

It is made of small cubes of agar jelly, a white translucent jelly made from red algae. The agar is dissolved with water (or fruit juice such as apple juice) to make the jelly. It is served in a bowl with sweet azuki bean paste or anko (the an part of anmitsu), boiled peas, often gyūhi and a variety of fruits such as peach slices, mikan, pieces of pineapples, and/or cherries. The anmitsu usually comes with a small pot of sweet black syrup, or mitsu (the mitsu part of anmitsu), which one pours onto the jelly before eating. Anmitsu is usually eaten with a spoon and fork.

A few variations on this dessert do exist. Mitsumame is anmitsu without bean paste, the mame meaning the peas that are served with the syrup and agar jelly instead. Cream anmitsu is anmitsu with ice cream on top. Shiratama dango are also commonly used as toppings.

== See also ==
- Kakigōri
