= Noboru Yamaguchi (author) =

Japanese writer

- Born: February 11, 1972; Hitachi, Ibaraki, Japan
- Died: April 4, 2013 (aged 41); Niigata, Japan
- Occupation: Author
- Known for: The Familiar of Zero, Green Green, Strike Witches

Noboru Yamaguchi (ヤマグチ ノボル, Yamaguchi Noboru; February 11, 1972 – April 4, 2013) was a Japanese light novel and game scenario author from Ibaraki Prefecture, Japan. He was well known for being the author of The Familiar of Zero light novels and visual novels by Frontwing.

== Biography ==
On February 11, 1972, he was born in Hitachi, Ibaraki. He graduated in Department of Political Science Division II, School of Political Science and Economics, Meiji University. In July 2011, he revealed on Media Factory's website that he had advanced stage cancer that was discovered in February of that year and which was untreatable at the time, which affected his work on the final two volumes of Zero no Tsukaima. After an unrelated gallstone surgery, the cancerous growth was found to have shrunk allowing surgery to take place in early August 2011. On November 1, 2011, he was invited to the event of "Amazon.co.jp 10th Anniversary", and he was inducted to a hall of fame in Japanese Books section, Amazon.co.jp 10th Anniversary. He was later readmitted to the hospital in December 2011, and had another surgery in November 2012. Yamaguchi died on April 4, 2013, at the age of 41. His funeral was held on April 9. His death was publicly announced on April 11 by his family and publishers.

== Works ==
=== Light novels (original) ===
Japanese Title	English Title	Year	Publishing label	No. of Volumes
Nibun no Ichi	Half	November 2000	Nijigen Dream Novels	1
Zero no Tsukaima	The Familiar of Zero	June 2004 - February 2017	MF Bunko J	22
Imōto Lesson Koko wa Otome no Sono	Sister Lesson Here is Maiden's Garden	March 2005	Bishojo Bunko	1
Zero no Tsukaima Gaiden; Tabitha no Bōken	The Familiar of Zero Side Story; Tabitha's Adventure	October 2006 - March 2009	MF Bunko J	3
Kaze no Kishihime	The Knight-Princess of The Gale	October 2009 - March 2010	MF Bunko J	2
Zero no Tsukaima Memorial Book	The Familiar of Zero Memorial Book	June 2017	MF Bunko J	1
Tsuppare Arisugawa	Be defiant, Arisugawa	July 2003	Kadokawa Sneaker Bunko	1
Sister Spring Itsukano Imouto	Sister Spring Sister in Someday	July 2004	Bishojo Bunko	1
Kakikake no Love Letter	Unfinished Love Letter	August 2004	Fujimi Mystery Bunko	1
Santa Kurarisu Kuraishisu	Santa Claris Crisis	December 2005	Fujimi Fantasia Bunko	1
Tōku 6 Mile no Kanojo	6 Miles Away from Her	February 2006	Fujimi Mystery Bunko	1
Potion Uri no Marea	Marea The Potion Saler	May 2006	Kadokawa Sneaker Bunko	1
Ani Yori Sugureta Imōto Nado; Konoyoni Sonzaisiteha Ikenai	The Sisters More Superior than the Brothers Mustn't Exist	December 2011	Atomic Bunko	1

=== Light novels (novelizations) ===
Japanese Title	English Title	Year	Publishing label	No. of Volumes
Canaria; ~Kono omoi wo Utani nosete~	Canaria; ~Song with my mind~	October 2010	Kadokawa Sneaker Bunko	1
Green Green; Kanenone Fantastic	Green Green; Kanenone Fantastic	April 2003	Kadokawa Sneaker Bunko	1
Green Green; Kanenone Stand By Me	Green Green; Kanenone Stand By Me	January 2004	MF Bunko J	1
Strike Witches 1 no maki Suomus Iranko Chūtai Ganbaru	Strike Witches Vol.1; Suomus Misfits Squadron Works Hard	October 2006	Kadokawa Sneaker Bunko	1
Strike Witches 2 no maki Suomus Iranko Chūtai Koisuru	Strike Witches Vol.2; Suomus Misfits Squadron Falls in Love	March 2007	Kadokawa Sneaker Bunko	1
Strike Witches 3 no maki Suomus Iranko Chūtai Hajikeru	Strike Witches Vol.3; Suomus Misfits Squadron Goes Wild	July 2008	Kadokawa Sneaker Bunko	1

=== Video game scenarios ===
Japanese Title	English Title	Year	Publisher
Canaria; ~Kono omoi wo Utani nosete~	Canaria; ~Song with my mind~	August 2000	Frontwing
Green Green	Green Green	October 2001	Groover
Gonna Be ??	Gonna Be ??	August 2002	Groover
Shiritsu Akihabara Gakuen	Private Akihabara School	August 2003	Frontwing
Yukiuta	Snow Song	December 2003	Survive
Makai Tenshi Djibril	Djibril – The Devil Angel	April 2004	Frontwing
Sora Uta	Sky Song	August 2005	Frontwing
Green Green 3 ~Hello, Goodbye~	Green Green 3 ~Hello, Goodbye~	August 2005	Frontwing
Boy Meets Girl	Boy Meets Girl	February 2006	Frontwing
Kimi Hagu	Forbidden Love Club	March 2007	Frontwing
Kami Pani!	Kimi Pani!	March 2008	Clochette
Hoshi Uta	Star Song	December 2008	Frontwing
Hoshi Uta ~Starlight Serenade~	Star Song ~Starlight Serenade~	December 2009	Frontwing
Yumemiru Tsuki no Lunalutia	Lunalutia of The Dreaming Moon	November 2011	Arianrhod

== Recognition ==
- Inducted into a hall of fame in Japanese Books section, Amazon.co.jp 10th Anniversary (November 1, 2011)
