= List of In Another World with My Smartphone volumes =

In Another World with My Smartphone is a Japanese light novel series written by Patora Fuyuhara and illustrated by Eiji Usatsuka. It began as a web novel on Shōsetsuka ni Narō website on April 8, 2013. The series was later published by Hobby Japan beginning on May 22, 2015; thirty-two volumes have been published as of August 19, 2026. J-Novel Club licensed the novel for a digital release. At Anime Expo on July 5, 2018, J-Novel Club announced that the series would be published in print with Ingram Publisher Services. The novel series was adapted into a manga series by Soto began serialization in the January 2017 issue of Comp Ace (published November 2016), with the first two compiled tankōbon volumes released consecutively in June and July 2017 and the third volume in February 2018.

== Light novel ==
No.	Title	Original release date	English release date
1	Sumaho o Katate ni Honobono i Sekai Bōken-ki! (スマホを片手にほのぼの異世界冒険記！)	May 22, 2015; 978-4-7986-1018-4	March 23, 2017 (digital); February 5, 2019 (print); 978-1-7183-5000-7
Prologue; Chapter I: "In Another World" (異世界に立つ, Isekai ni Tatsu); Chapter II: "The More The Merrier! Double the Joy, Half the Sorrow" (旅は道連れ、世は情け, Tabi wa Michizure, Yo wa Nasake); Chapter III: "The Crystal Creature" (水晶の怪物, Suishō no Kaibutsu); Chapter IV: "The Royal Family" (王家の人々, Ōke no Hitobito); Interlude I: "The Adventures" (冒険者たち, Bōkensha-tachi); Interlude II: "A Day in the Capital" (王都の一日, Ōto no Ichinichi)
2	Tsuginaru Bōken no Butai wa Kemonohito-tachi no Ōkoku! (次なる冒険の舞台は獣人たちの王国！)	August 22, 2015; 978-4-7986-1065-8	May 4, 2017 (digital); February 5, 2019 (print); 978-1-7183-5001-4
Chapter I: "Day-to-day Life I" (日々の暮らし その1, Hibi no Kurashi Sono 1); Chapter II: "To the Demi-Human Kingdom" (亜人の国へ, Ajin no Kuni e); Chapter III: "Day-to-day Life II" (日々の暮らし その2, Hibi no Kurashi Sono 2); Interlude I: "A Day Off in Mismide" (ミスミドの休日, Misumido no Kūjitsu); Interlude II: "Slime Castle" (スライムキャッスル, Suraimu Kyassuru)
3	Shinkoku Īshen de, Yae no Kazoku o Kyūshutsu Seyo! (神国イーシェンで、八重の家族を救出せよ！)	November 21, 2015; 978-4-7986-1117-4	June 14, 2017 (digital); April 2, 2019 (print); 978-1-7183-5002-1
Chapter I: "The Divine Nation, Eashen" (神国イーシェン, Shinkoku Īshen); Chapter II: "The Legacy of Babylon" (バビロンの遺産, Babiron no Isan); Chapter III: "Every Daylife in Another World" (異世界の日常, Isekai no Nichijō); Interlude I: "You Can't Hurry Love" (恋はあせらず, Koi wa Aserazu); Interlude II: "The Cursed Sea" (呪われた海, Norowareta Umi)
4	Regurusu Teikoku no Gunji Kūdetā o Soshi Seyo! (レグルス帝国の軍事クーデターを阻止せよ！)	February 20, 2016; 978-4-7986-1172-3	August 11, 2017 (digital); June 4, 2019 (print); 978-1-7183-5003-8
Chapter I: "The Encounter in the Desert" (砂漠の出会い, Sabaku no Deai); Chapter II: "Moon Reader, The Reading Cafe" (読書喫茶「月読」, Dokusho Kissa 'Tsukuyomi'); Interlude I: "The Assailants" (襲撃者ありて, Shūgekisha Arite); Chapter III: "Trouble in the Empire's Heart" (帝都動乱, Teito Dōran); Interlude II: "Grandmother and Granddaughter" (祖母と孫娘, Sobo to Magomusume)
5	Buryunhirudo-kōkoku Kenkoku Kinen-sai Kaimaku! (ブリュンヒルド公国建国記念祭開幕！)	May 21, 2016; 978-4-7986-1229-4	October 27, 2017 (digital); August 6, 2019 (print); 978-1-7183-5004-5
Chapter I: "The Founding Party" (建国親善パーティ, Kenkoku Shinzen Pātī); Chapter II: "The Sea of Trees and the Snowcapped Mountains" (大樹海、大雪山, Daijukai, Daisetsuzan); Chapter III: "God's Eyes Are Vigilant" (神様が見てる, Kamisama ga Miteru); Chapter IV: "Inproving the Duchy" (公国の歩み, Kōkoku no Ayumi); Interlude: "A Date Interrupted" (休日デートは突然に, Kyūjitsu Dēto wa Totsuzen ni)
6	Tsugi no Monodzukuri wa Kyodai Robotto!? (次のモノ作りは巨大ロボット!?)	August 23, 2016; 978-4-7986-1279-9	January 5, 2018 (digital); October 1, 2019 (print); 978-1-7183-5005-2
Chapter I: "Frame Gear" (フレームギア, Furēmu Gia); Chapter II: "The Two Princes" (二人の王子, Futari no Ōji); Chapter III: "If You're Prepared, There's Nothing To Fear!" (備えあれば憂いなし, Sonae areba Urei nashi); Interlude: "Mystic Eyes of the Catoblepas" (カトブレパスの魔眼, Katoburepasu no Magan); Interlude: "A Tour Through Brunhild" (ブリュンヒルド漫遊記, Buryunhirudo Man'yūki)
7	Fureizu no Dai Shinkō Kitaru! (フレイズの大侵攻来たる！)	November 24, 2016; 978-4-7986-1329-1	March 8, 2018 (digital); December 3, 2019 (print); 978-1-7183-5006-9
Chapter I: "Calamity" (災い来たりて, Wazawai Kitari te); Chapter II: "The Knight Princess' First Love" (初恋の姫騎士, Hatsukoi no Hime-Kishi); Chapter III: "The Pruning" (剪定の儀, Sentei no Gi); Interlude: "A Myriad of Love" (恋心色々, Koigokoro Iroiro)
8	Kenkoku-go-hatsu no Fuyu Tōrai (建国後初の冬到来)	March 23, 2017; 978-4-7986-1415-1	May 10, 2018 (digital); February 4, 2020 (print); 978-1-7183-5007-6
Chapter I: "The Archives of Wisdom" (叡智の書庫, Eichi no Shoko); Chapter II: "Dungeons & Dragons" (ダンジョンズ&ドラゴンズ, Danjonzu & Doragonzu); Chapter III: "The Dungeon's Conspiracy" (陰謀の迷宮, Inbō no Meikū); Interlude I: "The Trial of the Fairies" (妖精の試練, Yōsei no Shiren); Interlude II: "The Die Is Cast" (賽は投げられた, Sai wa Nagerareta)
9	Tsuini Hito-gata no Fureizu Tōjō! (ついに人型のフレイズ登場！)	June 22, 2017; 978-4-7986-1471-7	July 12, 2018 (digital); April 7, 2020 (print); 978-1-7183-1016-2
Chapter I: "The Roadmarian Rhapsody" (ロードメア狂想曲, Rōdomea Kōsōkyoku); Chapter II: "Errands of a Grand Duke" (王様は何かと忙しい, Ōsama wa Nanikato Isogasii); Interlude I: "Of Gods and Men" (神々と人々, Kamigami to Hitobito); Chapter III: "The Golden Gourd" (黄金の瓢箪, Ōgon no Hyōtan); Chapter IV: "The Magic Kingdom, Felsen" (魔法王国フェルゼン, Mahō Ōkoku Feruzen); Interlude II: "The Daughters of Babylon" (バビロンの子ら, Babiron no Kora)
10	Ano Hakase Okoshite Hontoni iino...? (あの博士起こしてほんとにいいの...？)	September 22, 2017; 978-4-7986-1532-5	September 20, 2018 (digital); June 2, 2020 (print); 978-1-7183-1018-6
Chapter I: "The Demon Kingdom Xenoahs" (魔王国ゼノアス, Maōkoku Zenoasu); Chapter II: "Babylon Rising" (バビロンの復活, Babiron no Fukkatsu); Chapter III: "Daydream Believer" (デイドリーム・ビリーバー, Deidorīmu Birībā); Chapter IV: "L'Etranger from Another World" (異世界の旅人, Isekai no Tabibito); Interlude I: "Father and Daughter" (父と娘。, Chichi to Musume.); Interlude II: "Doctor Babylon's Strange Love" (バビロン博士の異常な愛情, Babiron-hakase no Ijō na Aijō)
11	Kishi Dan'in Saiyō Shiken Kaishi! (騎士団員採用試験開始！)	December 22, 2017; 978-4-7986-1597-4	November 22, 2018 (digital); August 4, 2020 (print); 978-1-7183-1020-9
Chapter I: "Knights Wanted. Inquire Within." (騎士団員募集中, Kishi Dan'in Boshū Chū); Interlude I: "The Nowbies" (新人たち, "Shinjin-tachi"); Chapter II: "Working Toward Tomorrow" (明日のためにできること, Asita no tameni Dekirukoto); Chapter III: "The Gathering Gods" (神々の降臨, Kamigami no Kōrin); Chapter IV: "A Foreboding Encounter" (闇の邂逅, Yami no Kaikō); Chapter V: "Sandora, Burning Kingdom of Slaves" (奴隷王国サンドラ, Doreiōkoku Sandora); Interlude II: "A Restless Night" (眠れぬ夜に, Nemurenu Yoru ni)
12	Shin Sekai-hen Totsunyū! (新世界編突入！)	March 22, 2018; 978-4-7986-1651-3	January 26, 2019 (digital); October 6, 2020 (print); 978-1-7183-1022-3
Chapter I: "The Reverse World" (裏世界, Ura-Sekai); Chapter II: "The Wicked Godbeast" (邪神獣, Jashinjū); Interlude I: "The Bewitching Forest" (妖(あやかし)の森, Ayakashi no Mori); Chapter III: "The Phantom Thieves: `Red Cat'" (義賊・赤猫, Gizoku: Aka Neko); Chapter IV: "The Little King and the Prodigious Girl" (少年王と天才少女, Shōnen-ō to Tensai-Shōjo); Interlude II: "Stuffed Toy Fantasy" (ぬいぐるみ幻想曲(ファンタジー), Nuigurumi Fantajī)
13	Kyōgi-sai Kaimaku! (競技祭開幕！)	June 22, 2018; 978-4-7986-1713-8	March 17, 2019 (digital); December 1, 2020 (print); 978-1-7183-1024-7
Interlude: "Festival Preparation!" (祭りの準備, Matsuri no Junbi); Chapter I: "The Beginning of The Festival" (祭りの始まり, Matsuri no Hajimari); Chapter II: "The End of the Festival" (祭りの終わり, Matsuri no Owari); Chapter III: "The Bloodstained Market" (闇市場の惨劇, Yamiichiba no Sangeki); Chapter IV: "Everyday Life" (日々に新なり, Hibi ni Arata nari)
14	Fureizu no ō, Shutsugen. (フレイズの王、出現。)	September 22, 2018; 978-4-7986-1773-2	May 13, 2019 (digital); February 2, 2021 (print); 978-1-7183-1026-1
Chapter I: "The Encroaching Mutants" (忍び寄る異変, Shinobiyoru Ihen); Chapter II: "The Successor of the Gods" (神々を継ぐもの, Kamigami o Tsugumono); Interlude: "A Tale From Oedo" (オエド騒動記, Oedo Sōdōki); Chapter III: "The Sovereign Rises" (『王』の復活, 'Ō' no Fukkatsu); Chapter IV: "The Two Worlds" (二つの世界, Futatsu no Sekai)
15	Goremu tai Fureizu no Ōkibo-sen Boppatsu! (ゴレム対フレイズの大規模戦勃発！)	December 22, 2018; 978-4-7986-1825-8	June 23, 2019; April 6, 2021 (print); 978-1-7183-1028-5
Interlude I: "The Guardians of Brunhild" (ブリュンヒルドの守護者たち, Buryunhirudo no Shugosha-tachi); Chapter I: "The Egret Emissaries" (イグレットからの使者, Izuretto kara no Shisha); Chapter II: "The Reunion" (再会, Saikai); Interlude II: "I'm Happy Just To Dance With You"; Chapter III: "A Happy Twist of Fate" (合縁奇縁, Aien Kien); Interlude III: "Right by Your Side" (あなたのそばに, Anata no Soba ni)
16	Ura Sekai ni Honkaku San'nyū! (裏世界に本格参入！)	March 22, 2019; 978-4-7986-1888-3; 978-4-7986-1872-2 (SP)	August 11, 2019; June 1, 2021 (print); 978-1-7183-1030-8
Chapter I: "The Ruined Nation's Prince" (亡国の王子, Bōkoku no Ōji); Chapter II: "The Witch-King of Isengard" (アイゼンガルドの魔工王, Aizengarudo no Makō-ō); Interlude: "The Mysterious Sushi Adventure" (寿司は異なもの味なもの, Sushi wa Inamono Ajinamono); Chapter III: "The Rookies" (若き冒険者たち, Wakaki Bōkensha-tachi)
17	Goremu o Tsukatta Sen'yō-ki Tōjō!? (ゴレムを使った専用機登場!?)	June 22, 2019; 978-4-7986-1948-4	October 28, 2019; August 17, 2021 (print); 978-1-7183-1032-2
Chapter I: Interdimensional Networking (異世界交流, Isekai Kōryū); Interlude: The Otherworld Restaurant (異世界レストラン, Isekai Resutoran); Chapter II: The Great Marriage Caper (お見合い大作戦, Omiai Daisakusen); Chapter III: The Amazing Race (恋の駆け引き大レース, Koi no Kakehiki Dai-Rēsu); Chapter IV: The Puzzling Horn Concerto (ホルン狂想曲, Horun Kyōsōkyoku)
18	Tsuini Futatsu no Sekai ga Yūgō Suru!! (ついに二つの世界が融合する!!)	September 21, 2019; 978-4-7986-2004-6	January 7, 2020; October 19, 2021 (print); 978-1-7183-1034-6
Chapter I: The Divine Venom (神魔毒, Shinma-Doku); Interlude: Dragonslayer (ドラゴンスレイヤー, Doragon Sureiyā); Chapter II: A Muddled World (混迷する世界, Konmei suru Sekai); Chapter III: It's War! The Battle on Coastal Waters (激闘海岸, Gekitō Kaigan); Chapter IV: The White Crown (白の王冠, Shiro no Kuraun)
19	VS. Jashin, Kessen! (VS.邪神、決戦！)	December 21, 2019; 978-4-7986-2089-3; 978-4-7986-2077-0 (SP)	April 17, 2020; January 11, 2022 (print); 978-1-7183-5018-2
Chapter I: The Puretree Sapling (聖樹の苗木, Seiju no Naegi); Chapter II: Preparing for the Showdown (決戦準備, Kessen Junbi); Chapter III: Warped Aspirations (歪んだ野望, Yuganda Yabō); Chapter IV: We're all Connected (繋がる人々, Tsunagaru Hitobito)
20	Kekkon Junbi ni Zenryoku! (結婚準備に全力！)	March 21, 2020; 978-4-7986-2152-4	August 3, 2020; March 15, 2022 (print); 978-1-7183-5019-9
Chapter I: A Tale of Ice and Fire (炎の王国と氷の王国, Honō no Ōkoku to Kōri no Ōkoku); Chapter II: The Pantheon (万神殿, Man Shinden); Chapter III: Shadow of Nokia (ノキア王国の闇, Nokia Ōkoku no Yami); Interlude: Ceremonial Preparations (式の準備は着々と, Shiki no Junbi wa Chakuchakuto)
21	Kekkonshiki ni Chikyū Kankō! (結婚式に地球観光！)	June 22, 2020; 978-4-7986-2237-8	November 14, 2020; April 19, 2022 (print); 978-1-7183-5020-5
Chapter I: Before the Wedding (ウェディング・プレリュード, Wedingu Pureryūdo); Interlude: His Friend (とある友人の話, Toaru yūjin no Hanashi); Chapter II: The Royal Wedding (ロイヤル・ウェディング, Roiyaru Wedingu); Chapter III: In Another World On My Honeymoon (アナザーワールド・ハネムーン, Anazā Wārudo Hanemūn); Chapter IV: In Their Dreams (夢で逢えたら, Yume de Aetara); Chapter V: Back to Brunhild (異世界へ帰還, Isekai e Kikan)
22	Mirai Kara Musume ga Shūrai!? (未来から娘が襲来!?)	October 22, 2020; 978-4-7986-2325-2	May 14, 2021; June 7, 2022 (print); 978-1-7183-5021-2
Chapter I: A Spot of Matchmaking (お見合いパーティー, O Miai Pātī); Interlude: The Crystal Dragon (水晶の竜, Suishō no Ryū); Chapter II: Masquerade (仮面舞踏会, Kamen Budōkai); Chapter III: Great Expectations (それぞれの思惑, Sorezore no Omowaku); Chapter IV: The World of Tomorrow (未来からの来訪者, Mirai Kara no Raihōsha); Chapter V: Another Visitor (来訪者再び, Raihōsha Futatabi)
23	Zokuzoku Yattekuru Musume ni, Papa wa Akusenkutō!? (続々やってくる娘に、パパは悪戦苦闘!?)	February 19, 2021; 978-4-7986-2420-4	October 4, 2021 (digital); August 15, 2022 (print); 978-1-7183-1044-5; 978-1-7183-5022-9
Chapter I: Father & Daughter (父と娘, Chichi to Ko); Chapter II: That's My Chivalrous Girl (騎士の娘, Kishi no Musume); Chapter III: The Twins and Their Daughters (双子の母とその娘たち, Futago no Haha to Sono Musume-tachi); Chapter IV: Kids in the Park (遊園地の娘たち, Yuenchi no Musume-tachi); Chapter V: The Cook's Daughter (料理人の娘, Ryōri Hito no Musume)
24	"Hakobune" o Motomete Aratana Bōken e! (『方舟』を求めて新たな冒険へ！)	June 19, 2021; 978-4-7986-2513-3	January 12, 2022 (digital); October 3, 2022 (print); 978-1-7183-1046-9; 978-1-7183-5023-6
Chapter I: The Wicked Devout (邪神の使徒, Jashin no Shito); Chapter II: My Darling Diva Daughter (歌姫の娘, Utahime no Musume); Interlude: The Magnificent Mochizuki Mochi Malleting (望月家の餅つき, Mochidzuki-ka no Mochitsuki); Chapter III: Life Is A Circus (サーカスがやってきた, Sākasu ga Yattekita); Chapter IV: Grandparents and Grandchildren (祖父母と孫娘たち, Sofubo to Magomusume-tachi)
25	Tsuini 6 Hitome no Kodomo ga Gōryū......!? (遂に6人目の子供が合流......!?)	November 19, 2021; 978-4-7986-2668-0	July 4, 2022 (digital); January 16, 2023 (print); 978-1-7183-1048-3; 978-1-7183-5024-3
Chapter I: View from the Otherworld Train (異世界の車窓から, Isekai no Shasōkara); Chapter II: The Hidden Elven Refuge (エルフの隠れ里, Erufu no Kakurezato); Interlude: Magical Sugar (魔法の砂糖, Mahō no Satō); Chapter III: Agartha, the Mechanical City (機人都市アガルタ, Kijin Toshi Agaruta); Chapter IV: The Prince Returns (王子の帰還, Ōji no Kikan)
26	Kodomo no Tamenara Doko Made mo! (子供のためならどこまでも！)	April 19, 2022; 978-4-7986-2812-7; 978-4-7986-2704-5 (SP)	October 10, 2022 (digital); June 12, 2023 (print); 978-1-7183-5025-0
Retrospective: An Adventure In The Capital (王都の冒険者, Ōto no Bōken-sha); Chapter I: Fatherly Bonds (子供たちとの距離, Kodomo-tachi to no Kyori); Chapter II: The Ryutei's Rebirth (よみがえる龍帝, Yomigaeru Ryū Tei); Interlude: When You Wish Upon a Star (星に願いを, Hoshi ni Negai wo)
27	Saigo no Musume, Tsuini Gōryū!? (最後の娘、ついに合流!?)	October 19, 2022; 978-4-7986-2928-5	June 9, 2023 (digital); January 8, 2024 (print); 978-1-7183-5026-7
Chapter I: The Golden Gollem and the Littlest Lady (末娘と黄金のゴレム, Suemusume to Kogane no Goremu); Chapter II: The White Whale (白鯨, Hakugei); Interlude: A Very Normal Day for Brunhilde's Grand Duke (公王陛下のごく普通の一日, Kō-ō Heika no Goku Futsū no Tsuitachi); Chapter III: The Prismatis Rite (プリズマティスの儀, Purizumatisu no Gi)
28	Yome-tachi no Pinchi ni Kodomo-tachi Dai Katsuyaku!? (嫁たちのピンチに子供たち大活躍!?)	April 19, 2023; 978-4-7986-3164-6	October 23, 2023 (digital); September 9, 2024 (print); 978-1-7183-1054-4
Chapter I: A Double Confrontation with the Wicked Devout (邪神の使徒との二連戦, Jashin no Shito to no Nirensen); Chapter II: A Moment of Calm (束の間の休息, Tsuka no ma no Kyūsoku); Chapter III: The Sacred Treasure, Complete (神器完成, Jingi Kansei); Chapter IV: The Sovereign Phrase (フレイズの『王』, Fureizu no "Ō"); Intermission: Waterpark Rhapsody (ウォーターパーク・ラプソディ, Uōtāpāku Rapusodi)
29	Fureizu no Ō Shutsugen!? (フレイズの王出現!?)	October 19, 2023; 978-4-7986-3273-5	July 1, 2024 (digital); May 13, 2025 (print); 978-1-7183-1056-8
Chapter I: The Visitor from Phrasia (結晶界からの来訪者, Kesshō-kai Kara no Raihō-sha); Chapter II: Desert Stampede (砂漠のスタンピード, Sabaku no Sutanpīdo); Chapter III: Those Who Lurk in the Dark (暗黒街に巣食うモノ, Ankoku Machi ni Sukuu Mono); Chapter IV: The Secret of the Golden Crown (『金』の王冠の秘密, "Kin" no Ōkan no Himitsu); Intermission: Monsters and Magical Girls (怪人と魔法少女, Kaijin to Mahō Shōjo)
30	Mōhitotsu no "Kin no Ōkan"!? (もう一つの『金の王冠』!?)	May 17, 2024; 978-4-7986-3540-8; 978-4-7986-3527-9 (SP)	November 25, 2024 (digital); November 5, 2025 (print); 978-1-7183-5029-8
Chapter I: Megane Kyōsō Kyoku (眼鏡狂騒曲); Chapter II: Hakobune Kyōshū Sakusen (方舟強襲作戦); Chapter III: Ugokidasu Yashin (動き出す野心); Intermission: Buryunhirudo Rāmen Yokochō (ブリュンヒルドラーメン横丁)
31	Gorudo no Toki o Koeta Negai to wa ――. (ゴルドの時を超えた願いとは――。)	May 19, 2025; 978-4-7986-3697-9; 978-4-7986-3853-9 (SP)	November 20, 2025 (digital); August 11, 2026 (print); 978-1-7183-1060-5
Chapter I: Shikisha no Gosan (指揮者の誤算); Chapter II. Kyoju no Tō (巨樹の塔); Chapter III. Negai no Shūen (願いの終焉); Chapter IV. Kazoku Ryokō no Junbi (家族旅行の準備); Intermission: Kishi-ō no Isan (騎士王の遺産)
32	Futatabi Nihon e! Kodomo-tachi to Tomoni! (再び日本へ！ 子どもたちとともに！)	August 19, 2026; 978-4-7986-4242-0; 978-4-7986-4246-8 (SP)	—
Chapter I; Chikyū Ryokō Shuppatsu Shonichi ~ Futsukame (地球旅行出発 初日～二日目); Chapter II; Ryokan "Gingetsu" Mitsukame ~ Yotsukame (旅館『銀月』 三日目～四日目); Intermission I: Ryokan no Urayama Nite (旅館の裏山にて); Chapter III: Ao no Suizokukan Itsukame (青の水族館 五日目); Chapter IV: Kyūjitsu to Kusayakyū (休日と草野球); Intermission II: Sofu no Nokoshita Mono (祖父の遺したもの)

== Manga ==
No.	Original release date	Original ISBN	English release date	English ISBN
1	June 24, 2017	978-4-04-105769-8	April 13, 2021	978-1-9753-2103-1
2	July 24, 2017	978-4-04-106100-8	July 13, 2021	978-1-9753-2105-5
3	February 26, 2018	978-4-04-106547-1	September 28, 2021	978-1-9753-2107-9
4	May 25, 2018	978-4-04-107165-6	January 25, 2022	978-1-9753-2109-3
5	November 24, 2018	978-4-04-107165-6	April 26, 2022	978-1-9753-2111-6
6	May 24, 2019	978-4-04-108228-7	August 9, 2022	978-1-9753-2113-0
7	January 23, 2020	978-4-04-109034-3	January 17, 2023	978-1-9753-2115-4
8	May 25, 2020	978-4-04-109440-2	April 18, 2023	978-1-9753-2117-8
9	November 25, 2020	978-4-04-109441-9	July 18, 2023	978-1-9753-6237-9
10	May 26, 2021	978-4-04-111351-6	October 17, 2023	978-1-9753-6289-8
11	December 25, 2021	978-4-04-112012-5	February 20, 2024	978-1-9753-6291-1
12	July 26, 2022	978-4-04-112698-1	July 30, 2024	978-1-9753-7089-3
13	March 25, 2023	978-4-04-112699-8	November 26, 2024	978-1-9753-8867-6
14	October 26, 2023	978-4-04-114354-4	June 24, 2025	978-1-9753-8869-0
15	July 25, 2024	978-4-04-115212-6	January 20, 2026	979-8-8554-0081-6
16	December 25, 2024	978-4-04-115839-5	July 28, 2026	979-8-8554-2417-1
17	July 25, 2025	978-4-04-116475-4	April 27, 2027	979-8-8554-3857-4
18	February 25, 2026	978-4-04-117069-4	—	—
19	October 23, 2026	978-4-04-117878-2	—	—
