= AnimePlay =

Publishing label of Hirameki International

Anime Play is a trademark used to refer to the visual novel games distributed by Hirameki International and a discontinued magazine profiling these games.

== Anime Play DVD ==
Anime Play DVDs are the only English-language visual novels that are playable on standard DVD players; they can also be played on PCs with DVD-ROM drives or video game consoles that can play DVDs like the PlayStation 2 or Xbox. The restrictions of the DVD format mean that these games are missing many features present in most visual novels such as separate volume controls for music and voices; controlling the speed at which text is played; and ability to save the game at any point.

The following games have been released in Anime Play format:

- Phantom of Inferno, a crime/romance drama
- Amusement Park, a romantic drama
- Day of Love, a high school romance
- Tea Society of a Witch, a magical fantasy
- Hourglass of Summer, a time travel romance
- Ishika and Honori, a spiritual detective drama
- Dragonia, a fantasy adventure game
- Exodus Guilty, a three-part adventure taking place over three time periods

Hirameki International announced in 2003 that having released Phantom of Inferno earlier that year, they would be releasing fifteen more titles in AnimePlay format in the fourth quarter of 2003, and described all sixteen on their website; however, in summer of 2003 most of these titles were removed from the website. Phantom of Inferno, Amusement Park and Day of Love were the only games released in 2003. The full list of visual novels to which they apparently acquired the rights is:

- Phantom of Inferno: released in 2003
- Day of Love: released in 2003
- The Sixteenth Night Love Song, a love adventure game: status unknown
- The Bride of Ergeners, a marriage adventure game: status unknown
- Lying on Yoshia Heights, a fantasy adventure game: status unknown
- Koimusubi (Lovers' Knot), a romance story: status unknown
- Amusement Park: released in 2003
- Snow Talk, a fantasy simulation game: status unknown
- Separate Blue, a school love story: status unknown
- Azrael, a ghost story: status unknown
- Sweet Legacy, a cooking love story: status unknown
- Five O One, an action story: status unknown
- Canary, a school love story: status unknown
- Hooligan, an action love comedy: status unknown
- Tea Society of a Witch: released in summer 2004
- Hourglass of Summer: released in summer 2004

In late 2005, Hirameki announced on their blog that after releasing the remaining two volumes of Exodus Guilty, the Anime Play DVD series will be discontinued, and all of their visual novel titles will be released on PC.

== AnimePlay PC ==
AnimePlay PC games are the visual novels released in the United States by Hirameki International. Currently, they include:

- Ai Yori Aoshi, a port of the PlayStation 2 game.
- Animamundi, a gothic horror game.
- Ever17, a mystery/suspense/romance game.
- Piece of Wonder, a strategy game/romance.
- Yo-Jin-Bo, an action/romance game.

Hirameki has announced that all of their future releases (after finishing releasing the Exodus Guilty trilogy on Interactive DVD) will be on this product line. It is unknown whether any of the 15 titles announced for DVD release in 2003 are currently slated for a PC release.

As of January 2, 2008, Hirameki "has decided to bow out of publishing Interactive Visual Novels". The only retail store selling Anime Play products has also gone out of business.

Because of this, no more Anime Play DVDs or PC games will be sold.

== Anime Play magazine ==
Anime Play was also a quarterly magazine published by Hirameki International. It featured a thin print edition, with the majority of its material on an interactive DVD. The magazine mostly reviewed the Anime Play DVD releases, but anime and manga as well. The magazine published its first issue in July 2003. It was announced shortly after the opening of the Hirameki Community Site that Hirameki will no longer publish Anime Play magazine, choosing instead to focus on releasing PC titles.
