= 皇帝 (disambiguation) =

皇帝, meaning Emperor of China, may refer to:

- Kōtei, Japanese thoroughbred racehorse, Symboli Rudolf's nickname
- Kōtei, Kenichi Tahara the lead guitar of Japanese band Mr. Children.'s nickname
- Mikado Sumeragi (皇 帝), Japanese voice actor who cast in Japanese adult visual novels Da Capo II and Hoshiuta
