= Tea Society of a Witch =

2002 video game

- Tea Society of a Witch DVD cover
- Developer: Front Wing
- Publishers: Front Wing; Hirameki International
- Platforms: Windows, DVD
- Genres: Bishōjo, visual novel, eroge
- Mode: Single player

Tea Society of a Witch is an interactive AnimePlay DVD version of the Japanese bishōjo game Majo no Ochakai (魔女のお茶会) by Front Wing. The English-language version is an all-ages DVD role-playing game based on the Japanese Dreamcast version.

There is also a Japanese version with adult content for Windows. The main character is a young high school boy who meets a couple of witches. Depending on the choices made throughout the game, different endings can be achieved. An example of such a choice is the character who the player chooses to talk to each morning. The three girls who can be talked to each day in the English version are Nee, Drill, and Manamu.

== Characters ==
Rokusuke
He is the protagonist. He is a normal high-school boy. He boards Nee.
Megumi
Rokusuke's childhood friend. She is very energetic, but very lazy at home, and depends on Rokusuke to wake her up each morning. She boards Ponica at her house.

Ponica
The most advanced of the three witches. She has a cool and serious attitude which is may be the cause of her good grades. She may look like a child, but she is an adult.
Nee
The student who tries twice as hard as everyone else, but almost always fails.

Akiwo
The witches' instructor. She is quite an oddball, as her personality changes, and is randomly popping up everywhere.
Drill
A rich young brat, who always has her 'dog' Poochie with her. She is adept at using magic, but when she messes up she takes it out on Poochie.

Manamu
A shy high-school student. She is Megumi and Rokusuke's classmate, but is shy and likes to keep to herself. She works in the library, and has a crush on Rokusuke.

Kisho
Rokusuke's rival in rough terms. He boards Drill at his house during her stay in the human world. He comes from a rich family and is very materialistic.

== English DVD edition ==
The DVD is interactive and plays similarly to a video game. Continuing the story requires a password that the player is given at the end of each chapter.

Additionally, the English version is heavily edited. All the explicit adult scenes were removed and the character paths/endings for Ponica and Megumi are not available in that release. The Akiwo ending that was added for the Dreamcast version is also not available in the English DVD release.
