= The Familiar of Zero =

Japanese light novel series

- Cover of the first light novel volume featuring Louise

ゼロの使い魔 (Zero no Tsukaima)
- Genre: Fantasy comedy; Isekai; Harem
- Light novel
- Written by: Noboru Yamaguchi; Yū Shimizu (final two volumes)
- Illustrated by: Eiji Usatsuka
- Published by: Media Factory
- Imprint: MF Bunko J
- Original run: June 25, 2004 – February 24, 2017
- Volumes: 22 + side story collection
Further information
Manga
Zero's Familiar
Illustrated by	Nana Mochizuki
Published by	Media Factory
English publisher	NA: Seven Seas Entertainment
Magazine	Monthly Comic Alive
Original run	June 27, 2006 – October 27, 2009
Volumes	7
Anime television series
Directed by	Yoshiaki Iwasaki
Written by	Takao Yoshioka
Music by	Shinkichi Mitsumune
Studio	J.C.Staff
Licensed by	AUS: Hanabee; NA: Sentai Filmworks (Note: From 2007 to 2011, the distribution rights were held in North America by Geneon USA for dubbing while Funimation held the distribution sales.); SEA: Muse Communication; UK: MVM Films
Original network	CTC
Original run	July 3, 2006 – September 25, 2006
Episodes	13
Light novel
Zero no Tsukaima Gaiden: Tabatha no Bōken
Written by	Noboru Yamaguchi
Illustrated by	Eiji Usatsuka
Published by	Media Factory
Imprint	MF Bunko J
Original run	October 25, 2006 – March 25, 2009
Volumes	3
Anime television series
The Familiar of Zero: Knight of the Twin Moons
Directed by	Yū Kō
Written by	Yuji Kawahara
Music by	Shinkichi Mitsumune
Studio	J.C.Staff
Licensed by	AUS: Hanabee; NA: Sentai Filmworks; SEA: Muse Communication; UK: MVM Films
Original network	CTC, tvk
Original run	July 9, 2007 – September 24, 2007
Episodes	12
Manga
The Familiar of Zero Official Anthology Comic
Written by	Various artists
Published by	Media Factory
Original run	August 23, 2007 – September 23, 2008
Volumes	9
Manga
Zero no Tsukaima Gaiden: Tabatha no Bōken
Written by	Takuto Kon
Published by	Media Factory
Magazine	Monthly Comic Alive
Original run	October 27, 2007 – May 27, 2010
Volumes	5
Anime television series
The Familiar of Zero: Rondo of Princesses
Directed by	Yū Kō
Written by	Nahoko Hasegawa
Music by	Shinkichi Mitsumune
Studio	J.C.Staff
Licensed by	AUS: Hanabee; NA: Sentai Filmworks; SEA: Muse Communication; UK: MVM Films
Original network	CTC, tvk
English network	SG: Arts Central
Original run	July 6, 2008 – September 21, 2008
Episodes	12
Original video animation
The Familiar of Zero: Rondo of Princesses
Directed by	Yū Kō
Studio	J.C.Staff
Licensed by	NA: Sentai Filmworks; UK: MVM Films
Released	December 24, 2008
Runtime	24 minutes
Manga
Zero no Chukaima: Yōchien nano!
Written by	Takamura Masaya
Published by	Media Factory
Magazine	Monthly Comic Alive
Original run	September 26, 2009 – March 27, 2012
Volumes	3
Light novel
Kaze no Kishihime
Written by	Noboru Yamaguchi
Illustrated by	Eiji Usatsuka
Published by	Media Factory
Imprint	MF Bunko J
Original run	October 23, 2009 – March 25, 2010
Volumes	2
Manga
Zero's Familiar: Chevalier
Written by	Higa Yukari
Published by	Media Factory
English publisher	NA: Seven Seas Entertainment
Magazine	Monthly Comic Alive
Original run	January 27, 2010 – March 27, 2013
Volumes	4
Anime television series
The Familiar of Zero F
Directed by	Yoshiaki Iwasaki
Written by	Noboru Yamaguchi
Music by	Shinkichi Mitsumune
Studio	J.C.Staff
Licensed by	AUS: Hanabee; NA: Sentai Filmworks; SEA: Muse Communication; UK: MVM Films
Original network	AT-X
Original run	January 7, 2012 – March 24, 2012
Episodes	12
Visual novels
Zero no Tsukaima: Koakuma to Harukaze Concerto; Zero no Tsukaima: Muma ga Tsumugu Yokaze no Fantasy; Zero no Tsukaima: Maigo no Period to Ikusen no Symphony
- icon

The Familiar of Zero (Japanese: ゼロの使い魔, Hepburn: Zero no Tsukaima) is a Japanese fantasy light novel series written by Noboru Yamaguchi, with illustrations by Eiji Usatsuka. Media Factory published 20 volumes between June 2004 and February 2011. The series was left unfinished due to the author's death in 2013, but was later concluded in two volumes released in February 2016 and February 2017 with a different author, making use of notes left behind by Yamaguchi. The story features several characters from the second year class of a magic academy in a fictional magical world with the main characters being the inept mage Louise and her familiar from Earth, Saito Hiraga.

Between 2006 and 2012, the series was adapted by J.C.Staff into four anime television series and an additional original video animation episode. The first anime series was licensed by Geneon Entertainment in English, but the license expired in 2011. Sentai Filmworks has since re-licensed and re-released the first series and released the other three series in North America. A manga adaptation illustrated by Nana Mochizuki was serialized in Media Factory's manga magazine Monthly Comic Alive between June 2006 and October 2009. A sequel manga was serialized from January 2010 to March 2013. Both manga were released by Seven Seas Entertainment in North America. Two additional spin-off manga were also created, as were three visual novels.

== Synopsis ==
=== Setting ===
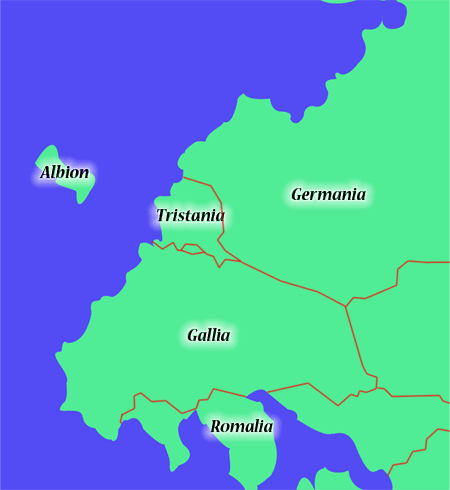
The fictional continent of Halkeginia bears similarities to Europe.

Halkeginia
Halkeginia (ハルケギニア, Harukeginia) is the continent that the story of The Familiar of Zero takes place on. Halkeginia's social structure is similar to the feudal class systems of Europe in the Middle Ages, with magic-users being considered nobles. The continent itself is vaguely reminiscent in shape to western Europe, with many of the countries carrying ancient and Roman names.
Tristain
Tristain (トリステイン, Torisutein; also "Tristein") is the nation in which the majority of the story takes place. It is a small monarchical country located in the northwest of Halkeginia and has come under threat from Albion. Tristain is home to a highly acclaimed magical academy known as the Tristain Academy of Magic, which attracts students from nearby countries. Militarily, the country is weak, with only a small permanent force, which forces it to make marriage alliances with other countries. The capital city is Tristania (トリスタニア, Torisutania). The country resembles Belgium.
Germania
Germania (ゲルマニア, Gerumania) is the largest kingdom in Halkeginia, and is also regarded as the strongest in terms of military might. It is regarded as a more barbaric and down-to-earth type of country, with its men considered to be brutish. Germania is located to the northeast of Tristain. Germania is the ancient Roman name for the region that is now Germany; the natives were at the time considered by the Romans to be barbarians. The country resembles Germany.
Gallia
Gallia (ガリア, Garia; also "Galia") is another kingdom in Halkeginia, located to the southeast of Tristania. Germania is on its eastern border, in the Alden Forest. It is the second largest country in Halkeginia. Within the Gallia Royal Family, murders and assassination attempts have led to an unstable royalty. There is a city named La Rochelle in the mountains, which is a major port. The capital city is Beautis. Gallia is reminiscent of modern-day France, which in the Roman era was called Gaul (Gallia in Latin). One of its palace/fortresses is called Alhambra Castle, named after the palace/fortress complex in Granada, Spain.
Albion
Albion (アルビオン, Arubion), nicknamed the white country, is an island nation which is in a period of political strife. According to the storyline, a group of nobles known as Reconquista initiated a coup d'etat against the royalty, and over the course of the story, succeed in killing the entire Albion Royal Family. Cromwell, the leader of the Albion rebellion, seeks to spread his power elsewhere, and begins by attacking Tristain. Albion is the ancient Greek name for the main island of Great Britain upon which are the modern nations England, Wales, and Scotland. The capital city of Albion is Londinium.
Cromwell is named after the leader of the Roundheads during the English Civil War, Oliver Cromwell, who successfully ousted the Monarchy, establishing a brief reign as Lord Protector until his death in 1658 prior to the return of Charles II.
Romalia
Romalia (ロマリア, Romaria) is a holy empire, located to the south of Gallia. There lies a city called Aquileia. Reminiscent of Italy, and specifically the Papal States (and the Vatican City; it is mentioned that they have a pope and officials who are bound to celibacy), which once controlled much of central and northern Italy.

==== Magic ====
The nobles of Halkeginia are magicians known as "mages" or "magi", and must use a wand or a staff to cast spells. Not all magi are nobles, as some have been forcibly demoted or given up their nobility and use their magic for thievery or to work as mercenaries.

There are four primary magic elements, corresponding to the four Classical elements: Fire, Water, Air, and Earth. Magi have an affinity to one of those elements. There is a fifth element, the legendary lost branch of element, known as Void. Magi can combine different magical elements or even stack the same element on top of itself to make spells more powerful. The power of a mage is determined by how many elements he or she can combine. There are four ranks of magician based upon this factor. Those who cannot combine any element together have the first rank, which is symbolized as a dot. Most magic students are in this class. The ability to combine two, three or four elements together leads to a magic user being referred to as a line, triangle, or square mage.

One of the major themes is that humans and technology from Earth displaced into the world of Halkeginia are considered to be highly magical, since Halkeginia itself has relatively primitive science and technology. For example, a magical item called the "Staff of Destruction" is, in reality, a human-made Vietnam-era M72 LAW rocket launcher. Other examples of Earth technology, often weaponry, appear throughout the story, such as a World War II era Mitsubishi A6M Zero fighter plane.

=== Plot ===
Louise Françoise Le Blanc de La Vallière is a member of the nobility who is terrible at magic, as her attempts usually result in an explosion. She is nicknamed "Louise the Zero" by her classmates, due to her inability to use any of the four magic elements. Early in the school year at the Tristain Academy of Magic, the second year students perform a special ritual where they summon their familiar, which serves as their eternal companion, protector and partner, and is usually some sort of magical creature. But Louise summons Saito Hiraga, an ordinary teenage boy from Japan, leaving her totally humiliated.

Due to the sacredness of the ritual (which makes it blasphemous to do it more than once), Louise reluctantly accepts Saito as her familiar, but proceeds to treat Saito as any other familiar, only worse: making him wash her clothes and sleep on a bed of hay, and whipping him with a riding crop whenever he upsets her. The Familiar of Zero follows the adventures of Louise and Saito as they help their classmates and friends, while occasionally blundering into situations where they risk their lives to save one another and Tristain. Saito tries to find a way to get back to Japan, but he also gains a mysterious power that allows him to wield swords and other weapons to perform heroic feats. They also eventually learn the truth behind Louise's magic (in)abilities. As Saito's and Louise's friendship grows and they start to work together, they ultimately fall in love with each other.

== Media ==
=== Light novels ===
The Familiar of Zero began as a series of light novels written by Noboru Yamaguchi and illustrated by Eiji Usatsuka under the original title Zero no Tsukaima. Media Factory published 20 volumes in Japan between June 25, 2004, and February 25, 2011. Further publication was threatened by Yamaguchi's advanced cancer, which he died from on April 4, 2013, leaving the series unfinished. Yamaguchi had planned the series to end with 22 volumes. However, it was later decided by the publisher to continue the series in the author's absence, due in part to calls from fans to continue the series, as well as Yamaguchi's family wanting to see it completed. Yamaguchi had dictated the remaining plot of the series, including its ending, and entrusted it to the editors. Media Factory released volume 21 on February 25, 2016, and the final volume 22 on February 24, 2017. Seven Seas Entertainment licensed the series in 2007 under the title Zero's Familiar, but later cancelled the release of the novels before releasing any.

A side-story, Zero no Tsukaima Gaiden: Tabatha no Bōken, initially available as a mobile phone online serial, was released in three volumes between October 25, 2006, and March 25, 2009. It centers on the adventures of the character Tabitha, Louise's classmate. Another side story, Kaze no Kishihime, was released in two volumes on October 23, 2009, and March 25, 2010. It is a prequel about Louise's mother's youth. A companion volume, Zero no Tsukaima Memorial Book, was released on June 24, 2017. It collected various short stories and illustrations previously unpublished in book format, as well as character designs and other information, such as outlines for volumes 21 and 22 left behind by Yamaguchi. It also revealed that the last two volumes of the series were written by Yū Shimizu, author of Bladedance of Elementalers, using Yamaguchi's notes.

=== Manga ===
A manga series illustrated by Nana Mochizuki was serialized in the Japanese seinen manga magazine Monthly Comic Alive between the August 2006 (Monthly Comic Alive debut issue, released on June 27) and October 2009 issues, published by Media Factory. Seven tankōbon volumes were released by Media Factory under their MF Comics imprint. The manga was licensed in North America by Seven Seas Entertainment under the title Zero's Familiar, and released in three omnibus volumes. The manga was also licensed by Elex Media Komputindo in Indonesia and released up to volume three in English under the title The Familiar of Zero, and in the Czech Republic by Zoner Press.

A sequel series, illustrated by Higa Yukari and titled Zero no Tsukaima Chevalier, was serialized between the March 2010 and May 2013 issues of Comic Alive and later compiled in four volumes. It was also released in North America by Seven Seas Entertainment under the name Zero's Familiar: Chevalier. Two spin-offs were serialized in Comic Alive: Zero no Tsukaima Gaiden: Tabatha no Bōken (a series primarily about Tabitha and her adventures) by Takuto Kon, which was serialized between December 2007 and August 2010 issues and compiled in five volumes, and Zero no Chukaima: Yōchien nano! (in which all of The Familiar of Zero characters are depicted as kindergarten children) by Takamura Masaya, serialized between September 2009 and March 2012 and compiled in three volumes. Nine volumes of the official anthology manga were published between August 23, 2007, and September 23, 2008.

=== Anime ===
The Familiar of Zero has been adapted into an anime series running for four seasons by the animation studio J.C.Staff. The first season aired in Japan between July 3 and September 25, 2006, and contained thirteen episodes. In April 2007 at Anime Boston, Geneon announced that they had picked up the English dubbing rights of the first season of the anime series under the title The Familiar of Zero. In July 2008, Geneon Entertainment and Funimation Entertainment announced an agreement to distribute select titles in North America. While Geneon Entertainment still retained the license, Funimation Entertainment assumed exclusive rights to the manufacturing, marketing, sales and distribution of select titles. The Familiar of Zero was one of several titles involved in the deal. Funimation released a complete box set of the series on November 4, 2008. Funimation reported their rights to the series expired in August 2011. Sentai Filmworks re-licensed the first series in North America in 2013 and released it digitally. Sentai released the Geneon English-language version on Blu-ray and DVD on April 8, 2014. Hanabee Entertainment later licensed the series in Australia in February 2014.

The second season under the extended title Zero no Tsukaima: Futatsuki no Kishi (ゼロの使い魔 ～双月の騎士～) aired in Japan between July 9 and September 24, 2007, containing twelve episodes. Sentai Filmworks licensed the second season (under the name The Familiar of Zero: Knight of the Twin Moons) in North America and released it on March 10, 2015, on Blu-ray and DVD.

The third season, also containing twelve episodes, entitled Zero no Tsukaima: Princesse no Rondo (ゼロの使い魔～三美姫の輪舞(プリンセッセのロンド)～), aired on Japan's Chiba TV between July 6 and September 21, 2008, and Arts Central in Singapore between July 10 and September 24, 2008. An original video animation episode for the third season was released on December 24, 2008. Sentai Filmworks licensed the third season with the OVA (under the name The Familiar of Zero: Rondo of Princesses) in North America and released them on May 12, 2015, on Blu-ray and DVD.

The fourth and final season titled Zero no Tsukaima F aired twelve episodes between January 7 and March 24, 2012. In 2012, Sentai Filmworks licensed the fourth season (under the name The Familiar of Zero F) in North America and released it on July 14, 2015, on Blu-ray and DVD. On March 10, 2026, The Familiar of Zero F debuted on the Hidive platform.

==== Music and audio CDs ====
The four anime seasons used two pieces of theme music each one opening theme and one ending theme. The first season's opening theme is "First kiss" by Ichiko, released on July 26, 2006, and the ending theme is "My True Feelings" (ホントノキモチ, Honto no Kimochi) by Rie Kugimiya, released on August 9, 2006. The second season's opening theme is "I Say Yes" by Ichiko, released on July 25, 2007, and the ending theme is "Suki!? Kirai!? Suki!!!" (スキ!? キライ!? スキ!!!, lit. Love?! Hate?! Love!!!) by Kugimiya, released on August 8, 2007. The first seasons original soundtrack was released on August 23, 2006, and the second seasons' soundtrack was released on August 22, 2007. The third season's opening theme is "You're The One" by Ichiko and the ending theme is "Gomen ne" by Kugimiya. The fourth season's opening theme is "I'll Be There For You" by Ichiko and the ending theme is "Kiss Shite Agenai" by Kugimiya, both released on February 1, 2012.

Both the first and second seasons released four character song albums each. The first CD is for Louise and Saito which is sung by Kugimiya and Satoshi Hino. The second CD is for Montmorency and Guiche which is sung by Mikako Takahashi and Takahiro Sakurai; the first two CDs were both released on September 6, 2006. The third CD is for Kirche and Tabitha which is sung by Nanako Inoue and Yuka Inokuchi. The fourth, and final CD from the first season, is for Henrietta and Siesta which is sung by Ayako Kawasumi and Yui Horie; the third and fourth CDs were both released on September 21, 2006. The first CD for the second season is for Louise which is sung by Kugimiya. The second CD is for Henrietta which is sung by Ayako Kawasumi; the first two CDs were both released on October 10, 2007. The third CD is for Siesta which is sung by Yui Horie. The fourth, and final CD from the second season, is for Eleanor and Cattleya which is sung by Kikuko Inoue and Kotomi Yamakawa; the third and fourth CDs were both released on October 24, 2007.

Two audio dramas were released for the second season. The first is a compilation of radio drama episodes from The Familiar of Zero Internet radio show Zero no Tsukaima on the radio: Tristain Mahō Gakuin e Yōkoso and was released on July 25, 2007. The second album is a drama CD featuring the characters Louise, Kirche, and Tabitha—voiced by Kugimiya, Nanako Inoue, and Yuka Inokuchi respectively—which was released on September 5, 2007.

=== Visual novels ===
Three visual novels for the PlayStation 2 were developed by Marvelous Interactive in which the player assumes the role of Saito Hiraga. The first, Zero no Tsukaima: Koakuma to Harukaze Concerto (ゼロの使い魔 小悪魔と春風の協奏曲; lit. 'The Familiar of Zero: Goblins and the Spring Breeze Concerto'), was released in limited and regular editions on February 15, 2007, in Japan. This was followed by Zero no Tsukaima: Muma ga Tsumugu Yokaze no Fantasy (ゼロの使い魔 夢魔が紡ぐ夜風の幻想曲) on November 29, 2007, and Zero no Tsukaima: Maigo no Period to Ikusen no Symphony (ゼロの使い魔 迷子の終止符と幾千の交響曲) on November 6, 2008.

== Reception and legacy ==
The light novels are one of the top selling series in Japan, with 6.8 million copies in print by February 2017. The Familiar of Zero and its fan fiction are often cited as influential in the development of modern isekai conventions. It popularized the isekai genre in web novel and light novel media, along with the website Shōsetsuka ni Narō, known as Narō for short. The Familiar of Zero fan fiction became popular on Narō during the late 2000s, eventually spawning a genre of isekai novels on the site, which became known as Narō novels. The Familiar of Zero fan fiction writers eventually began writing original isekai novels, such as Tappei Nagatsuki who went on to create Re:Zero in 2012.
