= Yo-Jin-Bo =

2005 video game

- Developer: Two-Five
- Publishers: JP: Two-Five; NA: Hirameki International
- Platforms: PlayStation 2, Windows
- Release: Windows: JP: July 29, 2005; NA: October 2006; Playstation 2: JP: October 26, 2006
- Genres: Visual novel, Otome game
- Mode: Single player

Yo-Jin-Bo (The Bodyguards) (用心棒, Yōjinbō) is a Japanese visual novel produced by Two-Five. In October 2006, Hirameki International released an English edition of the Windows version in the United States. It is part of their AnimePlay PC line, and as such is a Windows game (as opposed to the DVD games in that line, which have limited features). There is also a version for the PlayStation 2 titled Yo-Jin-Bo: Unmei no Freude and a manga adaptation of the game.

The explanation for this name is a bit of a pun, as "yojinbo" itself means "bodyguards" in English, and three of the main characters have nicknames that make up this phrase (Yo, Jin, and Bo). Incidentally, these three characters are the ones that seem to be naturally grouped by themselves, and the reader sees them all at a festival together at the introduction of the story.

== Plot ==
The story focuses on the main character Sayori, who is a modern high school girl. She finds a mysterious pendant while out helping with an archaeological dig, and later has a strange dream; she witnesses a scene from about 150 years ago, during the last days of the samurai, in which Hatsuhime, princess of the Mochizuke clan, is assassinated.

The scene changes, and Sayori realizes that she's in Hatsuhime's body. She realizes she has somehow seen how things were, and the situation has "reset", giving her the chance to avert the princess's terrible fate.

== Gameplay ==
This is considered a visual novel, and not a dating sim; however, effectively there are six "bodyguard" characters throughout the course of the game. The choices made by the player usually determine which one of these characters Sayori falls in love with. The game is also mainly targeted at teenage girls, and falls in the category of otome games.

The atmosphere is similar to the anime series Cowboy Bebop and Samurai Champloo, due to all the anachronisms and references to aspects of popular culture.

== Characters ==
Names are given surname-first, given name-last, if applicable.

- Hatsuhime (初姫) - princess of the Mochizuki clan. A bit tomboyish and prone to sneaking out of the castle at night, she frustrates her guardians. She gets caught up in a clan-succession conspiracy, one that seemingly proves fatal to her, and seems to reach out to Sayori through the mysterious green pendant that Sayori finds at the very beginning of the story. Voiced by Nami Kurokawa
- Sayori (紗依) - the main character. After inexplicably trading places with Hatsuhime, she finds herself playing the princess in order to save the princess' life (and her own).
- Tsukuba Muneshige (筑波宗重) - Hatsuhime's servant, and loyal samurai and clan vassal. He has a penchant for making terrible jokes and bad impressions, which he sometimes uses to try to cheer Hatsuhime/Sayori up. Unfortunately, his impressions can get himself into trouble, as well. Voiced by Jūrōta Kosugi
- Shiranui Yozaburō (不知火 用三郎) - usually just called Yo. He is one of the bodyguards hired to save Hatsuhime, and is the youngest of the group. He resents being treated like a child, and is from a ninja family. Voiced by Masakazu Morita
- Murasame Jinnosuke (村雨 心ノ介) - a fiery character with red hair and something of a rough - but good natured - temperament, he's one of the bodyguards hired to save Hatsuhime. He is also the first of such bodyguards you meet, as Hatsuhime bumps right into him at the festival, before the conspiracy and assassination attempt. He is exceptionally awkward around women, though Ittousai is even more awkward. Voiced by Hiroki Takahashi
- Tsubaki Tainojō (椿木 泰之丞) - his nickname "Bo" comes from an alternate way to read "Tsubaki". He is rather androgynous (bishōnen, actually), and is from a samurai family. He seems rather elegant, and is interested in the paranormal. Voiced by Hideo Ishikawa
- Mon-Mon (Kadokura Monzan) (モンモン(門倉紋山)) - a Buddhist priest, who seems to like the company of women. He is very strong, however, and knows many things and has even medical knowledge to the extent that he can stitch a wound back together perfectly. He gives himself the nickname "Mon-Mon", and tries to sound cute. This usually means he isn't taken seriously. Voiced by Tetsu Inada
- Tatsunami Ittousai (辰波一刀斎) - a suspicious person who wears glasses all the time; he is hired as a bodyguard but is seen by the others as nothing but an assassin or a sociopath. He also has a body covered with scars from old sword wounds. Apparently, Jin has also tried to kill him before, but Ittousai survived the attempt. He also wears his glasses even when bathing. Voiced by Hideki Ogihara
- Ohno Harumoto (大野治基)
- Fuuma Kasumimaru (風魔霞丸)
