= Djibril – The Devil Angel =

Japanese visual novel series

- Djibril (Jiburiru)- The Devil Angel
- From left to right: Djibril Aries, Djibril, Luvriel, Djibril Zero, and Misty Mei

魔界天使ジブリール (Makai Tenshi Djibril)
- Genre: Erotic comedy, magical girl
- Video game

Makai Tenshi Djibril
- Developer: Front Wing
- Genre: Eroge
- Platform: Windows98/2000/Me/XP/Vista
- Released: April 23, 2004 (Original Release), May 23, 2008 (Vista compatible)
- Original video animation

Makai Tenshi Djibril 01
- Directed by: Corrida
- Produced by: MS Pictures
- Studio: Front Wing; Animac
- Licensed by: NA: Kitty Media
- Released: 2004 – 2006
- Episodes: 4
- Video game

Makai Tenshi Djibril 2
- Developer: Front Wing
- Genre: Eroge
- Platform: Windows98/2000/Me/XP/Vista
- Released: April 22, 2005 (Original release), May 23, 2008 (Vista compatible)
- Original video animation

Makai Tenshi Djibril 02
- Directed by: Corrida (ep 1–2); Jiro Nakano (ep 3–4)
- Produced by: MS Pictures
- Studio: Front Wing; Milky Studio
- Licensed by: NA: Kitty Media
- Released: 2007 – 2009
- Episodes: 4
- Video game

Makai Tenshi Djibril 3
- Developer: Front Wing
- Genre: Eroge
- Platform: Windows2000/XP/Vista
- Released: June 27, 2008
- Original video animation

Makai Tenshi Djibril 03
- Directed by: Jiro Nakano
- Produced by: MS Pictures
- Studio: Front Wing; Milky Studio
- Licensed by: NA: Kitty Media
- Released: 2009 – 2010
- Episodes: 2
- Video game

Makai Tenshi Djibril 4
- Developer: Front Wing
- Genre: Eroge
- Platform: Windows2000/XP/Vista/7
- Released: April 23, 2010
- Video game

Sengoku Tenshi Djibril
- Developer: Front Wing
- Genre: Eroge
- Platform: Windows2000/XP/Vista/7
- Released: July 29, 2011
- Video game

Dennou Tenshi Djibril
- Developer: Front Wing
- Publisher: DMM/Fanza Games
- Genre: Eroge
- Platform: Browser, Android
- Released: April 2020

Djibril The Devil Angel (魔界天使ジブリール, Makai Tenshi Jiburīru (Makai Tenshi Djibril)) is an eroge visual novel series created by Frontwing composed of the classic entries and one spinoff, titled MegaChu. Each of the entries have also spawned trimmed down erotic OVA releases, which enjoyed mild popularity in the west. This series is created by Kūchū Yōsai and produced by Noboru Yamaguchi.

The first two games were re-released in 2008 due to a problem with DirectX 10 and the video playback software, causing Front Wing to standardize all three games released that year with the same engine, which removed compatibility with Windows 98 and Me. Makai Tenshi Djibril 4, the beginning of a new saga based at a school seemingly founded by Luvriel for Devil Angels, was released on April 23, 2010, and used, for the first time, graphics displayed in native 576i HD.

For the 2011 game, instead of Djibril The Devil Angel 5, the game is called Djibril The Angels Of The Warring States (戦国天使ジブリール, Sengoku Tenshi Jiburīru (Sengoku Tenshi Djibril)), and features all six of the main characters from Djibril Episode 1 to 4 as if they are from the Sengoku period of Japan, the last game produced by Noboru Yamaguchi before his death.

In early 2020, Frontwing announced a sixth game, in conjunction with DMM Games, starring a new cast of angels, titled Djibril The Angels Of Cyberspace (電脳天使ジブリール, Dennou Tenshi Jiburīru (Dennou Tenshi Djibril)), with a cyberspace theme, with the characters from the first three games returning with brand new designs. This is also the only game in the series with a partially censored version, as well as being released online. Both the censored and adults only versions were shut down in 2021.

== Plot ==
At the beginning of summer break, a young man named Naoto Jinno asked Rika Manabe, his girlfriend, to go out with him, planning to propose to her, only for his attempt to do so be interrupted by Asmodeus and Luvriel, commanders of a holy conflict, with Naoto and Rika helping Luvriel recover after she is defeated. As a result, Rika becomes a Devil Angel, an angelic warrior who fights using Amore, gathered through the act of making love, something Naoto is fairly happy to do.

In the second game, and its related anime, Hikari Jinno, his sister who was studying overseas, comes to visit, at the same time as Rococo, Asmodeus's sister, decides to attack Rika in revenge for Asmodeus's defeat, turning her into a demonic version of a Devil Angel, causing Hikari to end up a Devil Angel, with Naoto slightly more reluctantly, at first, generating Amore within her, and they manage to purify Rika and defeat Rococo.

In the third game, Naoto finds himself helping test out the New Angelic Gaia Interface, in the form of a blue haired girl, when a new antagonist, pretending to be a photography student, lures Rika and Hikari into a trap that sees Hikari corrupted and Rika unable to help. Due to NAGI's digital nature, she is able to regenerate from damage and take greater risks, which is needed when the demons deploy the first completely robotic devil...

The fourth game has a different concept, with Luvriel having established a school for potential Devil Angels, recruits Momo Sakura, Aoi Ayonokouji and Yuzuha Hoshikawa, also known as Spica, Althaea and Junos, to defend it from a pair of non-identical twin devils, Meimei and Maimai.

The fifth game was an anniversary title, featuring the casts of Makai Tenshi DJibril 3 and DJibril 4 meeting when Luvriel goes to see the Jinnos, only for them to be thrown into a parallel version of Sengoku Japan, with the various Devil Angels taking on personalities that were based on famous Japanese heroes as they try to figure out how to get back to the present.

The sixth, and currently final, game has Luvriel having re-established her school, this time placing the campus within cyberspace, with the assistance of the original devil angels. However, where there are angels, there will always be demons... and the angels will always need Amore...

== Characters ==
Naoto Jinno (神野直人, Jinno Naoto)
The main protagonist of the series. Ever since he met Rika when they were children, he became great friends with her. Until that incident that Rika had, Naoto wants to spend some more time with Rika and wanted to have a nice relationship with her, until Asmo came along and started trying to kidnap her. When Luvriel was knocked out in a stalemate in the battle with him, Naoto and Rika take her to his home to help her. As they realize that Luvriel was really an Angel, she told them the facts behind the incident and that she was too injured to continue fighting the demon boy. Rika wanted to be an Angel just like Luvriel, but it turns out that she has to have sex (and thus lose her virginity) to store up Amore power to shapeshift into an Angel, so she decided to lose her virginity to Naoto. Later in the second series, he becomes more caring than perverted than before. Ever since Rika was kidnapped, he felt emotional feelings in himself and has been saddened when Rika was kidnapped and missed her. This series later introduces his little stepsister, Hikari. She usually gets jealous but is sweet to her brother since they had a genetic sexual attraction to each other, which causes Hikari to worry. However, Naoto lets her sister help save Rika for him by shapeshifting into a Devil Angel by having sex with him and fights for his love.

Rika Manabe (真辺リカ, Manabe Rika)
Voiced by: Yukari Aoyama
A quiet and sweet student who has been a friend of Naoto since childhood. During her childhood, Naoto doesn't seem to be getting along with Rika pretty well back then, but when he got close to her, they were really close friends. As she accepts to be his girlfriend, she cried of joy. After hearing from Luvriel about the battles between the angels and the demons but that Luvriel was too injured to fight, Naoto wants to join in the fight. Unfortunately, for Naoto, angels are supposed to be girls, so Rika accepts to be a part of the army. But when Luvriel told Rika that she has to have sex to acquire Amore power, she felt shocked and worried. She was later kidnapped at the beginning of the second anime (Djibril The Second Coming Book 1) and has shapeshifted into a darker form of herself by the new demon character Miss Rococo.

Hikari Jinno (神野 ひかり, Jinno Hikari)
Voiced by: Minami Hokuto
Introduced in the second game, Hikari was visiting her brother, and witnesses the defeat of the original Djibril. Partially due to being exposed to the secret of Djibril, and partially because she was the only person available to replace Rika, she ends up recruited as the second Djibril, with the suffix of Aries, in order to rescue Rika from the clutches of Misty Mei and Rococo. Later in the third game, Similar to the kidnapping of Rika, she was captured by demons, shapeshifts into her darker self, and plays a major role of the game.

Nagi Jinno (神野 ナギ, Jinno Nagi)
Voiced by: Nagare Aokawa
The newest of the Devil Angels known as Djibril, Nagi is in fact a computer program called N.A.G.I., or the New Angelic Gaia Interface. Part of a new effort in Heaven to use less humans and angels in their battles, due to, effectively, demand outstripping supply, she is recruited to help with the main mission after some kind of strange spell has been cast on Rika, and Hikari was captured...

Luvriel/Loveriel (ラヴリエル, Ravurieru)
The only character not retired after Makai Tenshi Djibril 3, Luvriel is a low-ranking angel who appears as Asmo is attacking Rika, attempting to stop him, but failing, and deciding instead to move in with Naoto, help him support Rika, and later Hikari and Nagi, although she seems to spend more time spying on them while they're having sex. Also, despite Luvriel's childish appearance, and occasional behavior, she is in fact 10,009 years old
Whereas the opening of Makai Tenshi Djibril 2 uses the romanization Luvriel, in the openings of Makai Tenshi Djibril 4 and Sengoku Tenshi Djibril the spelling Loveriel is used.

== Devil Angels ==
A major plot point of each of the three games is the metamorphosis of the female lead into one of the Devil Angels, under the title of Djibril, with later games, and the associated anime including the sub-plot of cleansing a former lead character. This is done using a halo, normally supplied by Luvriel, but alternative metamorphosis methods do appear in the various games.

The form of a Devil Angel differs with the person, with each having both an angelic aspect and a demonic aspect, depending on how they gain the power to shapeshift. These usually are signified by a change in hair color, with angelic Djibrils, all having hair that is some shade of light blue, and the addition of a leotard-style outfit. The only exclusion to this is the New Angelic Gaia Interface, which only has the metamorphosis being that N.A.G.I. just gained a leotard. In Makai Tenshi Djibril 4, however, this is changed completely to a form of a jumpsuit, with hair colors not changing, and, by Dennou Tenshi Djibril, all Devil Angels are created in the same way as N.A.G.I. In the games, the dark aspect is indicated by the colors of their uniforms changing to red and black, as well as changing their eye color, as well as other additions dependent on the level of corruption. Later games used the specific title Djibril for them so they wouldn't be confused with the historical angel Gabriel.

Known Devil Angels include –

Rika Manabe (Djibril)
The first of the three Devil Angels, as well as the only one not related, by blood or choice, to Naoto. She is Luvriel's replacement in the first game, due to a mutually assured destruction strategy gone wrong. She was captured in the second game by a giant wormlike creature, over the course of the game, put through a perverse version of her training in the first game, and in the third game, she was weakened by the use of a spell cast through the corrupted hand of Dark Aries.

Hikari Jinno (Djibril Aries/Dark Aries)
The second of the three Devil Angels, Aries was recruited to replace Rika when she is defeated in battle and taken as spoils. She also spends most of the third game in a second, corrupted, persona of Dark Aries, which has a unique power to control minds. She is stronger-willed than Rika, managing to break the controlling influence of Misty Mei in the third game multiple times, and, at least in the anime, summoning her own 'Super Nova' style attack despite being almost completely controlled.

New Angelic Gaia Interface (Djibril Zero)
Djibril Zero is a last-resort Djibril, in that a N.A.G.I. has the capability to regenerate damage, and even incapacitation, within reason, can be recovered from as long as the interface can be restarted properly. She has only been used once in this capacity, during the third game, when Jibril Aries is abducted, and used to further incapacitate the original Djibril.

Momo Sakura, Aoi Ayonokouji and Yuzuha Hoshikawa (Spica, Althaea and Junos)
A trio of students at Luvriel's first attempt at a school for angels, who manage to become Devil Angels. Notably, from this point on, the appearance of Devil Angels varies wildly.

DJibril Regulus, Muse and Alnair
Three of the students at Luvriel's second attempt at a school. Notably, there are over a dozen other confirmed Devil Angels, but these are the only ones explicitly named.

Meimi Otonashi (Misty Mei)
While not a Devil Angel in the sense that she was recruited by Asmo originally, Misty Mei does gain power in the same ways as all three Djibrils. Numerous attempts have been made to befriend Misty Mei, but she is never able to achieve her actual Djibril appearance or identity, appearing, in all three original games, as a gothic lolita with black bat wings. Notably, She was pivotal in some cases to the capture and controlling of the first two Devil Angels.

Super X-32
A false angel created in the third game and anime, intended to be a counter for the Djibril series. Rather than having a human component, Super X-32 is a gynoid with several weapons and features intended to render the need for agents like Dark Aries and Misty Mei largely redundant. In the anime, she is considered to be N.A.G.I.'s mirror duplicate, an artificial devil program to fight the artificial angel program, while in the games, she is only encountered once during N.A.G.I.'s ending path, and is not actually fought.

=== Powers ===
"Amore" (Magical Energy): Metamorphoses Rika, Hikari or Nagi into Djbril from having sex with a person of the opposite sex for whom they care for. Negative Amore, created by tentacle and/or demonic sex causes a Devil Angel to turn dark. Notably, Super X-32 can absorb and use positively charged Amore according to the anime, making it clear the Amore is virtually identical, but processed differently by a Devil Angel, however it is made.

"Tenshi no Shiki" (Angelic Ceremony): By performing particular sexual acts under the same conditions as when they accumulate Amore certain powers are stored up. Each power has two different forms: A Heaven Form and a Hell Form, which are achieved by a different act, but give the same effect. Despite the names of the forms, they do not visibly cause a Devil Angel to have a greater or lesser chance of turning Dark over time. These were phased out with later revisions of the Djibril metamorphosis process.

"Cellular Regeneration": A unique power of Djibril Zero, She is able to regenerate battle damage like the loss of limbs without too much effort, but she is not able to avoid some forms of damage, due to limits in her programming. This also allows her to shapeshift parts of her body to create extra weapons to offset the loss of some human-type Djibrils.

"Angel Super Nova": A Super Form, used once when their main powers fail them, this powers them up, allowing them to break free from whatever danger they are in. It is empowered by the wishes of someone who they especially care about.

In Series 1, Djibril used this to break up the perverted Angelic Ceremony and allowed herself to destroy Rirouge.
In Series 2, Djibril Aries used a variant of the technique to both defeat Dark Djibril and to break free of the dark trance.

As far as can be told, Djibril Zero, Super X-32 and Misty Mei cannot use any version of this ability, the former due to being artificially created, the latter due to never appearing in any of the three games as an angel.

"Zero Cannon": An ability shown for Djibril Zero in the anime, it allows her to attack demons at more extreme ranges, by firing a beam of positively charged Amore, with the side effect that it cannot be used to defeat Devil Angels, including artificial ones like Super X-32.

== Theme songs ==
In the series, the opening theme songs differ from one another. Game theme songs were later inserted in the anime series at the end of credits, when the episode ends, in lieu of title credits. These were supplemented in the latest two games by ending themes, with both games having their opening sequences released online well in advance of the game's release. In the original three games, The themes, where appropriate, are used in instrumental form as a leitmotif for each of the main female leads, and a remixed instrumental form is used as the menu theme for all four games. The lyrics, composer, and vocals of the theme songs for all six games were written by the Japanese pop rock band, Funta (Under the name of U), with the help of the anime J-pop company, GWAVE.

Themes in Episode 1

- Opening: Let's Go Lovely Henshin Time! (レッゴー ラヴリィ 変身タイム!, Retsugō Ravurii Henshin Taimu!)

Themes in Episode 2

- Opening: Little my star

Themes in Episode 3

- Opening: Kuru Kuru Lovely Day (クルクルlovely day)
- Ending: To the End of Space in the Galaxy (銀河系の宇宙の果てまで, Gingakei no Uchū no Hate made)

Themes in Episode 4

- Opening: The first, the Last
- Ending: 新生時〜この恋ときみとあたし〜

Themes in Episode 5 (Sengoku)

- Opening: Sakura☆Saku

Themes in Episode 6 (Dennou)

- Opening: Angel Beat

Kuru Kuru Lovely Day was released as an audio CD as part of the promotional materials for Episode 3. Other themes include "Control Is Impossible", a fast tune used in the three games and two anime to indicate a comical or crazy moment, which seems, in a lot of cases, to involve directly Luvriel, becoming almost a leitmotif in itself.
