= Frontwing =

Japanese visual novel studio

- Native name: 株式会社フロントウイング
- Type: Kabushiki gaisha
- Industry: Computer games
- Founded: 2000; 26 years ago
- Headquarters: Taitō, Tokyo, Japan
- Key people: Ryūichirō Yamakawa (Producer, President and CEO); Akio Watanabe (Director and Character Designer); Fumio (Game illustrator); Yōsai Kūchū (Game illustrator and Character Designer)
- Products: Eroge, Visual novels
- Owner: Good Smile Company (50.625%)
- Website: frontwing.jp

Frontwing Co., Ltd. (株式会社フロントウイング, Kabushiki-gaisha Furonto Uingu) is a Japanese visual novel studio known for the production of adult bishōjo games. Its main office is located in Taitō, Tokyo. The representative producer and president is Ryūichirō Yamakawa. “Frontwing” is the company's main brand, but it has also released games under affiliated brands “Survive” (サヴァイブ), “Hotchkiss” (ホチキス), and “b-wing.” These brands have all since merged to become “Frontwing.”

Frontwing's games cover a diverse range of genres, from school love life stories to hardcore adult games, and also games that utilize 3D computer graphics. The 3D content production team, Polygon Mura (ポリゴン村), is closely involved in the games’ production by seeking ways to incorporate 3D graphics into essentially 2D projects. Several of their games, originally produced for PC, have been ported to consoles. The development of the ported versions is generally done in-house. The company is also active in many other fields, including the development of the dance 3D software Dance X Mixer, taking part in the bi-annual Comic Market, and Niconico live broadcasts.

Since the company's founding in 1999 as a bishōjo games developer and the release of Frontwing's first title, Canary (Canaria: Kono Omoi o Uta ni Nosete) in August 2000, it has published over 20 titles in the visual novel genre. The studio's flagship games include the Netherworld Angel Djibril series, and the Grisaia trilogy which spawned an animated series in 2015. In regards to the Djibril series, writer Naoki Miyamoto, author of the book "Adult Games: Introduction to Cultural Studies”, has pointed out why there is a big demand for such works: “If the one to fight is a beautiful heroine, the risks she takes stimulate people's erotic imagination.”

In 2011, the first installment of the Grisaia series, The Fruit of Grisaia, won first place in the Moe Game Award. The second installment, The Labyrinth of Grisaia, won second place in 2012.

Frontwing marked its first venture into the overseas market May 29, 2015, with the English release of The Fruit of Grisaia on Steam. The company has since established its own in-house translation team, which made its debut with the English release of The Leisure of Grisaia on May 18, 2016.

On March 16, 2021, Frontwing announced that Bushiroad had acquired a 50.625% controlling stake of the company, with Frontwing becoming a subsidiary of Bushiroad.

On September 20, 2024, Bushiroad announced that it had sold all of its acquired stake in Frontwing to Good Smile Company, effectively making the company a subsidiary of the latter.

== List of visual novels ==
Listed by brand, in chronological order.

Frontwing

Japan Release date	Japanese title	English title	English Release date
August 4, 2000	カナリア 〜この想いを歌に乗せて〜 (Kanaria ~Kono Omoi o Uta ni Nosete~)	Canary	N/A
November 11, 2001	フーリガン (Hooligan)	Hooligan	N/A
September 27, 2002	魔女のお茶会 (Majo no Ochakai)	Tea Society of a Witch	N/A
March 28, 2003	スイートレガシー (Sweet Legacy)	Sweet Legacy	N/A
August 29, 2003	私立アキハバラ学園 (Shiritsu Akihabara Gakuen)	Private Akihabara Academy	N/A
December 19, 2003	あきばこ～「私立アキハバラ学園」ファンディスク～ (Akibako ~"Shiritsu Akihabara Gakuen" Fandisk~)	Akibox ~"Private Akihabara Academy" Fandisk~	N/A
April 23, 2004	魔界天使ジブリール (Makai Tenshi Djibril)	Netherworld Angel Djibril	N/A
August 27, 2004	そらうた (Sorauta)	Sky Song	N/A
April 22, 2005	魔界天使ジブリール－episode2－ (Makai Tenshi Djibril -episode2-)	Netherworld Angel Djibril -episode 2-	N/A
February 24, 2006	ボーイミーツガール (Boy Meets Girl)	Boy Meets Girl	N/A
September 9, 2006	めがちゅ！ (Megachu!)	Megachu!	N/A
March 23, 2007	きみはぐ (Kimihagu)	Kimi Hug	N/A
December 27, 2007	タイムリープ (Taimu Riipu)	Time Leap	N/A
June 27, 2008	魔界天使ジブリール－episode3－ (Makai Tenshi Djibril －episode3－)	Netherworld Angel Djibril -episode 3-	N/A
December 26, 2008	ほしうた (Hoshiuta)	Star Song	N/A
August 28, 2009	タイムリープぱらだいす (Taimu Rīpu Paradaisu)	Time Leap Paradise	N/A
December 25, 2009	ほしうたStarlight Serenade (Hoshiuta Starlight Serenade)	Star Song ~Starlight Serenade~	N/A
April 23, 2010	魔界天使ジブリール－episode4－ (Makai Tenshi Djibril －episode4－)	Netherworld Angel Djibril -episode 4-	N/A
February 25, 2011	グリザイアの果実 (Gurizaia no Kajitsu)	Le Fruit de la Grisaia (French for The Fruit of the Grisaia)	May 29, 2015
July 29, 2011	戦国天使ジブリール－ (Sengoku Tenshi Djibril)	Warring States Angel Djibril	N/A
February 24, 2012	グリザイアの迷宮 (Gurizaia no Meikyū)	Le Labyrinthe de la Grisaia (French for The Labyrinth of the Grisaia)	June 22, 2016
September 28, 2012	ピュアガール (Pure Girl)	Pure Girl	N/A
March 29, 2013	グリザイアの楽園 (Gurizaia no Rakuen)	Le Eden de la Grisaia (French for The Eden of the Grisaia)	N/A
February 28, 2014	イノセントガール (Innocent Girl)	Innocent Girl	N/A
August 15, 2014	アイドル魔法少女ちるちる☆みちる (Idol Mahō Shōjo Chiru Chiru☆Michiru)	Idol Magical Girl Chiru Chiru☆Michiru	July 29, 2015
March 27, 2015	ゆきこいめると (Yukikoi Meruto)	Yukikoi Melt	N/A
October 23, 2015	グリザイアの有閑 (Gurizaia no Yūkan)	The Leisure of Grisaia	May 18, 2016
November 27, 2015	果つることなき未来ヨリ (Hatsuru Koto Naki Mirai Yori)	From the Future Undying	N/A
December 12, 2015	グリザイアの残光 (Gurizaia no Zankō)	The Afterglow of Grisaia	July 20, 2016
April 28, 2016	アイランド (Airando)	ISLAND	August 23, 2018
N/A	N/A	Purino Party	June 23, 2016
August 28, 2016	コロナ・ブロッサム Vol.1 (Korona Burossamu Vol.1)	Corona Blossom Volume 1: Gift From The Galaxy	July 29, 2016
October 28, 2016	コロナ・ブロッサム Vol.2 (Korona Burossamu Vol.2)	Corona Blossom Volume 2: The Truth From Beyond	October 26, 2016
January 26, 2017	コロナ・ブロッサム Vol.3 (Korona Burossamu Vol.3)	Corona Blossom Volume 3: Journey To The Stars	January 26, 2017
April 28, 2017	グリザイア ファントムトリガー（第1・2巻） (Gurizaia:Phantom Trigger)	Grisaia: Phantom Trigger	April 28, 2017
July 28, 2017	グリザイア ファントムトリガー（第3巻） (Gurizaia:Phantom Trigger)		
January 26, 2018	グリザイア ファントムトリガー（第4巻） (Gurizaia:Phantom Trigger)		
April 27, 2018	ももいろクローゼット (Momoiro Kurōzetto)	Momoiro Closet	May 8, 2018
July 27, 2018	グリザイア ファントムトリガー（第5巻） (Gurizaia:Phantom Trigger)		
October 26, 2018	ろけらぶ 同棲×後輩 (Rokerabu - Dousei x Kouhai)	Loca-Love: My Cute Roommate	October 26, 2018
April 26, 2019	グリザイア ファントムトリガー（第5.5・6巻） (Gurizaia:Phantom Trigger)		
August 30, 2019	ろけらぶ 電車×同級生		
April 23, 2020	電脳天使ジブリール		
June 19, 2020	Atri: My Dear Moments		
July 22, 2020	グリザイア ファントムトリガー（第7巻）		
September 25, 2020	ろけらぶ 神社×先輩		
November 26, 2020	グリザイア クロノスリベリオン		
February 25, 2022	グリザイア ファントムトリガー（第8巻）		
April 5, 2022	グリザイア 戦場のバルカローレ		
April 28, 2023	グリザイア クロノスリベリオン		
October 26, 2023	GINKA		
August 8, 2024	少女☆歌劇 レヴュースタァライト 舞台奏像劇 遥かなるエルドラド (Shōjo☆Kageki Revue Starlight Butai Sōzōgeki Harukanaru El Dorado)	Revue Starlight El Dorado	August 8, 2024

=== Survive ===
Japan Release date	Japanese title	English title	English Release date
December 20, 2002	アズラエル (Azrael)	Azrael	N/A
December 19, 2003	ゆきうた (Yukiuta)	Snow Song	N/A
January 31, 2003	セパレイトブルー (Separate Blue)	Separation Blues	N/A

=== Hotchkiss ===
Japan Release date	Japanese title	English title	English Release date
August 8, 2002	クランクイン－早春賦－ (Hotchkiss Crankin)	Hotchkiss Crank In!	N/A
October 10, 2003	ふたごえっち (Futago Ecchi)	Twin Sex	N/A

=== b-wing ===
Japan Release date	Japanese title	English title	English Release date
August 8, 2003	Take off!!	Take Off!!	N/A

== Incidents ==
- Green Green High-Cost, Miscommunication and Copyright Dispute Case
