= Eiji Usatsuka =

Japanese light novel illustrator

Eiji Usatsuka (兎塚 エイジ, Usatsuka Eiji; born August 16 in Osaka Prefecture, Japan) is a Japanese light novel illustrator. He is notable for the illustration for the series Zero no Tsukaima. He illustrates insert images for many novels.

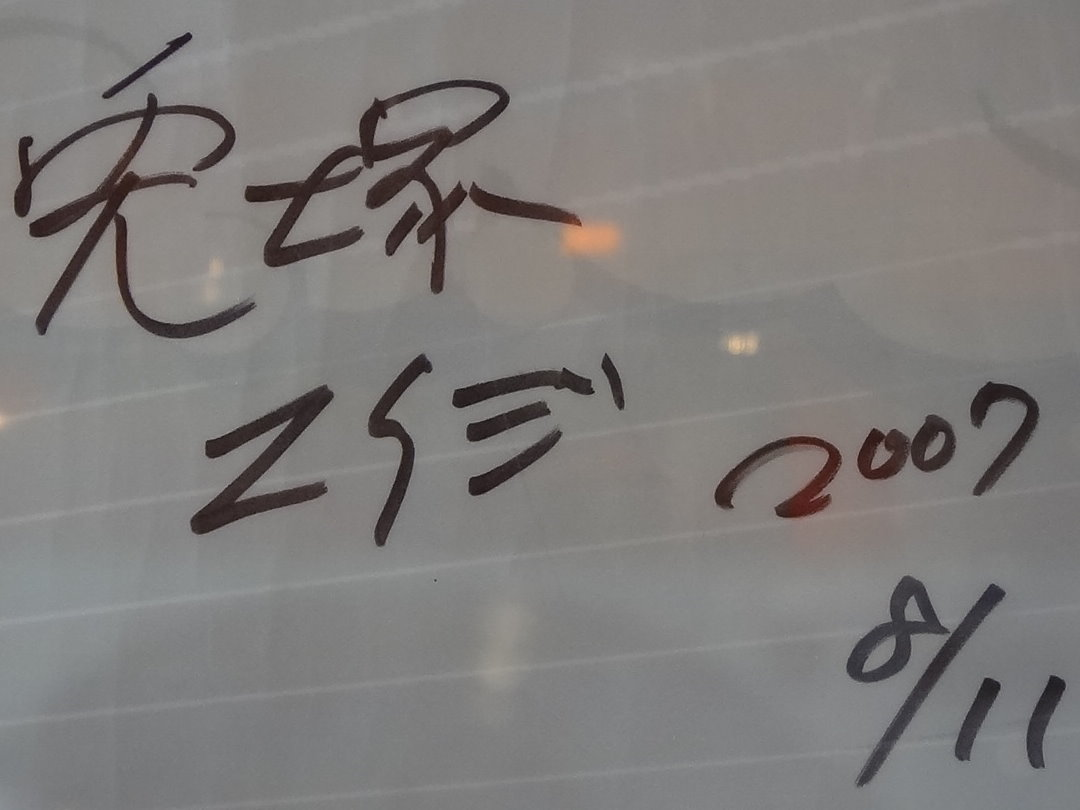
Eiji Usatsuka's signature

After university graduation he was employed as illustrator by the visual novel publisher Visual Art's using the pseudonym Sawagani (サワガニ, Japanese Freshwater Crab). As side job he made illustrations for light novels which is against the company policy. The similarity of "both peoples" designs, were however noticed and later revealed by Tōya Okano (scenario assistant for Visual Art's' Clannad) in a Dengeki G's Magazine interview article presenting Visual Art's brand Mana's game Angel Magister.

== Works ==
Novels and other works he contributed his illustrations to include:

- Hayate the Combat Butler light novel #2
- Zero no Tsukaima
  - Zero no Tsukaima Gaiden: Tabatha no Bōken
  - Kaze no Kishihime
- Shinkyoku Sōkai Polyphonica Marble
- Shinkyoku Sōkai Polyphonica Blue Series
- Scramble Heart as Sawagani
- In Another World With My Smartphone
- Angel Magister
