= In Another World with My Smartphone =

Japanese fantasy light novel series and its franchise

- Cover of the first volume featuring Yumina (left), Touya (middle), and Sushie (right)

異世界はスマートフォンとともに。 (Isekai wa Sumātofon to Tomo ni)
- Genre: Fantasy, harem, isekai
- Novel series
- Written by: Patora Fuyuhara
- Published by: Shōsetsuka ni Narō
- Original run: April 8, 2013 – November 18, 2024
- Light novel
- Written by: Patora Fuyuhara
- Illustrated by: Eiji Usatsuka
- Published by: Hobby Japan
- English publisher: NA: J-Novel Club
- Imprint: HJ Novels
- Original run: May 22, 2015 – present
- Volumes: 32
- Manga
- Illustrated by: Soto
- Published by: Kadokawa Shoten
- English publisher: NA: Yen Press
- Magazine: Comp Ace
- Original run: November 26, 2016 – present
- Volumes: 19
- Anime television series
- Directed by: Takeyuki Yanase (S1); Yoshiaki Iwasaki (S2)
- Produced by: Hiromi Sueta; Ryuji Kasamatsu; Keiji Hamada; Shigeto Nihei; Yasuyuki Iwanami; Hideo Momoda
- Written by: Natsuko Takahashi (S1); Deko Akao (S2)
- Music by: Exit Tunes (S1); Kei Yoshikawa (S2); Kōhei Yamada (S2)
- Studio: Production Reed (S1); J.C.Staff (S2) (Note: Production assistance (制作協力) for season 2 provided by ENGI.)
- Licensed by: Crunchyroll; SA/SEA: Medialink
- Original network: AT-X, BS11, Tokyo MX (S1), TV Tokyo (S2)
- English network: SEA: Animax Asia
- Original run: July 11, 2017 – June 19, 2023
- Episodes: 24
- icon

In Another World with My Smartphone (異世界はスマートフォンとともに。, Isekai wa Sumātofon to Tomo ni), also known as IseSuma (異世スマ) for short, is a Japanese light novel series written by Patora Fuyuhara and illustrated by Eiji Usatsuka. It was serialized online on the user-generated novel publishing website Shōsetsuka ni Narō from April 2013 to November 2024. It was later acquired by Hobby Japan for publishing the print edition as a light novel. J-Novel Club has licensed the series for an English release, releasing each novel in six weekly parts since February 2017. A manga adaptation by Soto began its serialization in Kadokawa Shoten's Comp Ace in November 2016. The manga is licensed in English by Yen Press. An anime television series adaptation by Production Reed aired from July to September 2017. A second season by J.C.Staff aired from April to June 2023.

== Plot ==
Fifteen-year-old Touya Mochizuki is accidentally killed by God via lightning. As an apology, God allows him to be resurrected, but since he cannot send him back to his old world, he instead reincarnates him into a fantasy world along with any special requests. Touya requested to bring his smartphone into the new world with him, which God accommodates with some modifications. Although Touya is unable to contact his old world with it, the phone can be easily recharged by magic and can otherwise function, such as accessing data from Earth and can use relevant features for his new world such as the GPS function to locations which are comprehensively identified, Internet access to the World Wide Web of Earth, and camera features.

As a further apology for the inconvenience of killing him, God also greatly amplifies Touya's physical, magical, and cognitive abilities to a certain degree, making him an adventurer of overwhelming power. Taking full advantage of his second chance at life, Touya befriends many different people, mainly women and high-ranking people in his new world, eventually having nine fiancées. He begins to travel from country to country, solving political disputes, engaging in minor quests, and nonchalantly enjoying himself with his newfound allies. During his travels, he faces many monsters, villainous people, and powerful crystal creatures called the Phrase.

== Media ==
=== Light novels ===
The series began publication as a web novel, being serialized on the Shōsetsuka ni Narō website from April 8, 2013, to November 18, 2024. The series was later published as a light novel series under Hobby Japan's "HJ Novels" label beginning on May 22, 2015; thirty-two volumes have been published as of August 19, 2026. The light novel features illustrations by Eiji Usatsuka. It was licensed for digital distribution in the English language by J-Novel Club. J-Novel Club announced at Anime Expo on July 5, 2018, that the series would be the first it would publish in print outside its deal with Seven Seas Entertainment. The novels is published in a partnership with Ingram Publisher Services.

=== Manga ===
A manga adaptation by Soto began serialization in the January 2017 issue of Comp Ace (published November 2016), with the first two compiled tankōbon volumes released consecutively in June and July 2017 and the third volume in February 2018. Yen Press announced during its panel at the New York Comic Con Metaverse digital event in October 2020 that it had licensed the manga.

=== Anime ===
An anime television series adaptation directed by Takeyuki Yanase, written by Natsuko Takahashi, and animated by Production Reed was announced and aired from July 11 to September 26, 2017. AŌP performed the opening theme song "Another World" while Maaya Uchida, Yui Fukuo, Chinatsu Akasaki, Marika Kōno, Nanami Yamashita, and Sumire Uesaka. performed different versions of the ending theme song "Junjō Emotional" (純情エモーショナル, Pure Emotional). Crunchyroll streamed the series, while Funimation produced an English dub and released it on home video as part of the two companies' partnership. Funimation released the series for home video in the British Isles, and in Australia and New Zealand, through their distributors at Sony Pictures UK and Universal Sony respectively.

A second season was announced on April 15, 2022. The second season is animated by J.C.Staff and directed by Yoshiaki Iwasaki, with Deko Akao handling series composition, Chinatsu Kameyama designing the characters and serving as chief animation director, and Kei Yoshikawa and Kōhei Yamada composing the music. The cast reprised their roles from the first season and the drama CD. It premiered on April 3, 2023, to June 19, 2023. Gemstone7 performed the opening theme song "Real Diamond" (リアルダイヤモンド).

=== Game ===
A browser game titled In Another World with My Smartphone: Happiness Cradle based on the anime released on September 28, 2023. The game is available on the G123 platform.

== Reception ==
The series has seen considerable popularity on the Shōsetsuka ni Narō website, having been viewed over 100,000,000 times in total.

== See also ==
- The Master of Ragnarok & Blesser of Einherjar—Another isekai series involving a cell phone
