= Hoshiuta =

2008 video game

- Hoshiuta original game cover featuring (from left to right) Kurara, Renge, Yui, Nanano, and Midori

ほしうた
- Video game
- Developer: Front Wing
- Genre: Bishōjo game, Eroge, Visual novel
- Platform: Windows
- Released: December 26, 2008
- Manga
- Written by: Fumio
- Published by: Kadokawa Shoten
- Magazine: Comp Ace
- Original run: March 26, 2009 – June 26, 2010

Hoshiuta (Japanese: ほしうた; lit. "Star Song") is a Japanese adult visual novel developed by Front Wing which was released on December 26, 2008, playable for Windows as a DVD.

Hoshiuta is Front Wing's twenty-first title and the third title of Uta series along with their previous titles Yukiuta and Sorauta.

A manga adaptation illustrated by Fumio began serialization in the May 2009 issue of Kadokawa Shoten's Comp Ace magazine.

A spin-off sequel to the visual novel entitled Hoshiuta: Starlight Serenade was released on December 25, 2009.

== Setting ==
Hoshiuta is set in the fictional town Mihoshi (美星; lit."beautiful star") in Shizuoka Prefecture, Japan. The town is in a quiet, rural area on the west of the Izu Peninsula and borders the Suruga Bay. There is a high school named Mihoshi Academy (美星学園, Mihoshi Gakuen) in the town. The protagonist Kazuhiko Suoh and his friends are students of the school.

== Characters ==
=== Main characters ===
Kazuhiko Suoh (周防 和彦, Suō Kazuhiko)
Kazuhiko is a second-year male student of Mihoshi Academy and is the protagonist of the story. He was left an orphan in his childhood, and was adopted by an old woman named Hina Suoh.
Yui Kuroda (黒田 結衣, Kuroda Yui)
Voiced by:Ayaka Kimura
Yui is a second-year female student. She is Kazuhiko's childhood friend and his classmate. She and her parents moved from Tokyo to Mihoshi nine years ago. She has a positive personality, but she is not good at studying and cooking. Her parents run a Japanese-style hotel named Kuroda Ryokan. Kazuhiko and Yui work together at Kuroda Ryokan.
Nanano Suoh (周防 ななの, Suō Nanano)
Voiced by:Tomoe Tamiyasu
Nanano is Kazuhiko's younger sister-in-law and a first-year student. She is Hina Suoh's granddaughter. Her parents died in her childhood the same as Kazuhiko's parents. She has an innocent personality and loves Kazuhiko very much.
Kurara Amamiya (雨宮 くらら, Amamiya Kurara)
Voiced by: Kaname Yuzuki
Kurara is a second-year female student. Her father Masaki Amamiya (雨宮 雅樹, Amamiya Masaki) is the president of Amamiya Zaibatsu which is one of the largest companies in Japan, but she does not boast of that. She moved from Tokyo to Mihoshi before the summer vacation begins, and became a classmate of Kazuhiko and Yui. She is good at cooking and painting pictures.
Midori Kinoshita (木ノ下 翠, Kinoshita Midori)
Voiced by: Yukari Aoyama
Midori is a third-year female student and good friend of Kazuhiko, Yui, and Nanano. She has used a wheelchair since four years ago when she lost the use of her left leg in a traffic accident. She and her friends call her wheelchair "Hayate" (ハヤテ号, Hayate-gō; lit"gale"). She is very spirited and good at swimming.
Renge Yamabuki (山吹 れんげ, Yamabuki Renge)
Voiced by: Karen Aozora
Renge is a mysterious girl living in a Western-style house built nearby the sea. Kazuhiko met her in his way to the school on a morning. She likes playing tricks and often fibs. Unlike other main characters, she is not Mihoshi Academy's student.

=== Supporting characters ===
Yousuke Kasai (笠井 洋介, Kasai Yōsuke)
Voiced by: Mikado Sumeragi
Yousuke is a second-year male student and a classmate of Kazuhiko. Kazuhiko and Yousuke became friends after they had entered Mihoshi Academy. He is not good at studying.
Arisa Houjou (北条 亜里砂, Hōjō Arisa)
Voiced by:Rina Misaki
Arisa is a second-year female student and a classmate of Kazuhiko. She moved from Tokyo to Mihoshi last year. Her father Tetsuo Houjou (北条 哲夫, Hōjō Tetsuo) manages a large company named Houjou Group, and she is proud of that. She is smart and good at studying.
Koume Hirose (広瀬 小梅, Hirose Koume)
Voiced by:Hazuki Sakura
Koume is a maid working under Amamiya family. She has looked after Kurara since about ten years ago.
Kayo Kuroda (黒田 香代, Kuroda Kayo)
Voiced by:Kū Iida
Kayo is Yui's mother and the landlady of Kuroda Ryokan.
Hina Suoh (周防 ヒナ, Suō Hina)
Voiced by:Eiko Matsu
Hina is Nanano's grandmother and Kazuhiko's grandmother-in-law. She took charge of Kazuhiko and Nanano and brought them up, but she died at age seventy-two last year. She worked at Kuroda Ryokan as a waitress during her lifetime.
Seiko Morishita (森下 聖子, Morishita Seiko)
Voiced by:Ayumu Kawase
Seiko is a young female teacher working at Mihoshi Academy. She is in charge of Japanese history lessons and is the homeroom teacher of Kazuhiko's class.
Kamejirou (カメ次郎, Kamejirō)
Voiced by:Kanade Amano
Kamejirou is a turtle which Kazuhiko and Nanano have as their pet. Kame means "turtle" in Japanese, and Jirou is one of Japanese male names. Nanano likes Kamejirou very much.
Yurika Amamiya (雨宮 百合香, Amamiya Yurika)
Voiced by:Izumi Maki
Yurika is Kurara's mother and Masaki Amamiya's former wife. She died of an illness about ten years ago. She was very kind to Kurara.
Tamaki Amamiya (雨宮 環, Amamiya Tamaki)
Voiced by:Kanai Nirai
Tamaki is Kurara's stepmother and Masaki Amamiya's present wife. She used to be an able secretary to Masaki. She married Masaki after Yurika had died. She is not kind to Kurara.
Teppei Kinoshita (木ノ下 鉄平, Kinoshita Teppei)
Voiced by:Ajisai
Teppei is Midori's father and a fisherman. He dotes upon his daughter. His wife died of an illness when Midori was a child.
Kaori Mutou (武藤 カオリ, Mutō Kaori)
Voiced by:Mirin Yamada
Mutou is a housekeeper living with Renge. She is very kind and thinks as if Renge were her daughter.
Kyousuke Kashimura (柏村 恭介, Kashimura Kyōsuke)
Voiced by:Jimudaisya
Kashimura is Renge's father. He divorced Renge's mother when Renge was a child.

== Development ==
Direction and planning for Hoshiuta and Hoshiuta: Starlight Serenade was done by Ryūichirō Yamakawa. Characters were designed by Fumio. Scenario was written by Noboru Yamaguchi, Takeyuki Kuzumi, and Katsuya. Music in the game was composed by Elements Garden.

== Music and audio CDs ==
Hoshiuta's opening theme is "Missing Person" (尋ねビト, Tazunebito) sung by Lia, the insert song is "Cradle Song" (揺籃歌-ヨウランカ-, Yōranka) by Kaori Ōmura, and the ending theme is "At the End of Summer" (夏の終わりに, Natsu no Owari ni) by Hiromi Satō. Before the game's release, a maxi-single "Tazunebito" was released by Front Wing on November 28, 2008, and contained "Missing Person" and "Cradle Song".

Hoshiuta: Starlight Serenade's opening theme is "Stardust Bonds" (星屑のキズナ, Hoshikuzu no Kizuna) by Lia, and the ending theme is "Twilight Sky" (たそがれ空, Tasogare-zora) by Chata. Before the game's release, a maxi-single "Hoshikuzu no Kizuna" was released by Front Wing on October 2, 2009, and contained "Stardust Bonds" and "Twilight Sky".

Music of the five songs was composed by Hitoshi Fujima, who is a member of Elements Garden.

Hoshiuta's original soundtrack was released by Front Wing on January 30, 2009, and contained twenty-seven tracks.

== Manga ==
Hoshiuta was adapted into a manga series drawn by Japanese illustrator Fumio. The manga began its serialization in the manga magazine Comp Ace's May 2009 issue, first published on March 26, 2009, by Kadokawa Shoten.

== Book ==
An art book entitled Fumio ArtWorks Hoshiuta was released on Comiket 76 held in August 2009.
