= Canary (video game) =

Japanese visual novel

カナリア 〜この想いを歌に乗せて〜 (Canaria Kono Omoi o Uta ni Nosete)
- Genre: Hentai, Romance, Comedy
- Video game
- Developer: Front Wing
- Produced by: Kei, Bamboo
- Music by: Clapscrap
- Genre: Eroge
- Platform: Windows95/98, Dreamcast, Playstation 2
- Released: August 4, 2000 (Windows); August 23, 2001 (Dreamcast); November 22, 2002 (Windows) - re-released April 10, 2003 (PS2); November 27, 2005 (Mobile Phones)
- Original video animation
- Released: March 22, 2002

Canary ~My Feelings into a Song~ (カナリア 〜この想いを歌に乗せて〜, Kanaria ~kono omoi o uta ni nosete~) is the first eroge game made by Front Wing, and has also been adapted into an anime OVA. The game was re-released for the Dreamcast and PlayStation 2 along with the book Canary Official Visual Guide in non-adult content.

== Story ==
Game

Youhei Hozumi is a Tokyo man who moves to Shizoku to help his uncle with his music studio in the countryside of Shizuoka. He then stumbles upon a few people who were in his uncle's studio and felt interested in the band who rented their rooms. He later finds out that the people in the Shinjyou studio also attended Kotohira Gakuen. Later, he meets Ayana Saeki and Mika Katagiri at the school and introduces himself to the band. Depending on who you choose, the two girls tell Youhei that there wasn't a person in their band that could sing and were struggling to find those people. How will Youhei solve the problem within their band? The story is tailored to the choices you choose.

OVA

Mika Katagiri wants her band to perform at the upcoming local festival. However, complications arise. Their keyboardist, Jun, refuses to play, and their stage has been canceled. Refusing to give up, Mika and her band strive to find a way to play at the festival, using any means necessary.

== Characters ==
Ayana Saeki

Ayana Saeki plays the guitar and is considered to be cheerful, calm, and an easygoing character according to her peers. She is one of the main two characters Youhei meets at the beginning of the story. During the map location scene, you can often find her at Kotohira Gakuen either cleaning, tuning her guitar, or talking to Youhei.

Mika Katagiri

Mika Katagiri is a girl whose parents run an udon shop in the area. Mika is also the percussion in the band. She is one of the main two characters Youhei meets. She has a very bullish type personality and she often insults Youhei for a lot of his mistakes. But deep inside her, she doesn't feel happy with the way she is handling a lot of people and wants to change herself for the better.

Eri Hozumi

Eri Hozumi is Youhei's little sister. She is a girl who tends to spend most of her days at home watching dramas that the main character sees as very questionable business. She also likes to practice the piano and ask very strange questions to Youhei about his love interests.

Chiaki Shinjyou

Chiaki Shinjyou is Youhei's cousin. She has a very calm and sweet personality and is considered to be a few years older than Youhei. She was also one of the original members of the previous light music club, in charge of the vocals and side guitar. However, she retired from that type of business and now helps around the Shinjyou Studio. During the map location, you can often find her at the Shinjyou studio.

Megumi Chigasaki

Megumi Chigasaki is a woman who hangs around in the shopping district street. Upon meeting her, she is very active and energetic and gets in a fight with Youhei at the beginning of her path starting on May 28. Youhei later finds out that she is homeless and lives in a shipwreck all by herself. During the map location, she is often found in the shopping district street.

Mai Hoshino

Hoshino Mai is a character whom you meet during your map location adventure on May 28. She is not present in the adult PC game but is present in the consumer version of the game. (Dreamcast / PlayStation 2) She commonly hangs around the school doing chores around the club. She can also be found at the beginning of May 28 cleaning the Light Music Club room at Kotohira Gakuen.

Sena Yahagi

Yahagi Sena is a little girl who you meet in Mika's Udon shop. She is the daughter of Youhei's teacher, Yahagi Yuuji. She is said to be extremely smart at her age and mostly spends most of her time hanging around in Mika's Udon Shop on certain days.

== Reception ==
On release, Famitsu magazine scored the Dreamcast version of the game a 30 out of 40.

THEM Anime Reviews gave the OVA a negative review, stating that it relied too much on sight gags while have poor plotting and no character development.
