= Yūko Gotō =

Japanese actress, voice actress and singer

- 後藤 邑子
- Born: August 28, 1975 (age 51); Aichi Prefecture, Japan
- Other names: Gotouther-sama; Murako; Gotouza
- Occupations: Actress; voice actress; singer
- Years active: 1999–present
- Agent: Axlone
- Notable credits: The Melancholy of Haruhi Suzumiya as Mikuru Asahina; Hidamari Sketch as Hiro; Puella Magi Madoka Magica as Junko Kaname
- Height: 163 cm (5 ft 4 in)

Yūko Gotō (後藤 邑子, Gotō Yūko; born August 28, 1975) is a Japanese actress, voice actress and singer who was contracted to Production Baobab and is now signed to Axlone. In direct contrast to her cute-and-vulnerable moé typecasting, Yūko in real life is a devotee of biker culture who dresses and acts as such when not working, right down to her motorcycle. This is parodied in the 23rd episode of Lucky Star, in which she appears as a masculine Bōsōzoku-styled character of herself called Gotouza, a nickname given to her by fellow voice actor Tomokazu Sugita. She is also a fluent English speaker.

In 2012, she announced that she is suffering from idiopathic thrombocytopenic purpura and systemic lupus erythematosus. She is currently performing voice actor activity, while frequently going to the hospital, but recovered on October 4.

== Filmography ==
=== Anime ===
List of voice performances in anime
Year	Title	Role	Notes	Source
1999	Iketeru Futari	Kaneto Sakurai		
1999	∀ Gundam	Girlfriend	Episode 2	
1999	Nekojiru Gekijou	Nyansuke		
2000	UFO Baby	Sayuri		
2001	Hooligan	Yuka Amō	Adult OVA	
2002	Mirmo!	Kameri		
2002	Naruto	Futaba	Episode 56	
2002	GetBackers	Nurse	Episode 35	
2003	The World of Narue	Yuki Kashiwazaki		
2003	Mizuiro	Hiyori Hayasaka	OVA	
2003	Milkyway	Sakuya Mikage	Adult OVA	
2003	Please Twins!	Girl Student		
2004	Genshiken	Susanna Hopkins		
2004	Kujibiki Unbalance	Kaoruko Yamada	OVA	
2005	Twin Princess of Wonder Planet	Rein		
2005	Shuffle!	Kaede Fuyou		
2005	Lamune	Nanami Konoe		
2005	I"s Pure	Yuka Morisaki	OVA	
2006	Twin Princess of Wonder Planet Gyu!	Rein		
2006	Gintama	Kirara	Episodes 127-128	
2006	The Melancholy of Haruhi Suzumiya	Mikuru Asahina		
2006	Lovely Idol	Miu Nekoya		
2006	Kujibiki Unbalance (TV)	Kaoruko Yamada		
2006	Otome wa Boku ni Koishiteru	Ichiko Takashima		
2007	Shuffle! Memories	Kaede Fuyou		
2007	Hidamari Sketch	Hiro	Also Specials	
2007	Dancouga Nova – Super God Beast Armor	Ada Rossa		
2007	Hayate the Combat Butler	Maou		
2007	Lucky Star	Ayano Minegishi, Gotouza-sama/Herself		
2007	Sayonara, Zetsubou-Sensei	Abiru Kobushi		
2007	Sketchbook ~full color'S~	Kate		
2007	Blue Drop: Tenshi-tachi no Gikyoku	Tsubael		
2007	Night Wizard THE ANIMATION	Bell Zephyr		
2007	Dragonaut - The Resonance	Makina		
2007	Genshiken Pt.2	Susanna Hopkins		
2008	(Zoku) Sayonara, Zetsubou-Sensei	Abiru Kobushi		
2008	Kimi ga Aruji de Shitsuji ga Ore de	Miyu Kuonji		
2008	Yotsunoha	Iori Yuzuki	OVA	
2008	Code Geass: Lelouch of the Rebellion R2	Anya Alstreim, Mutsuki Minase, Monika Kruszewski		
2008	Itazura na Kiss	Christine "Chris" Robbins		
2008	S.A: Special A	Hikari Hanazono		
2008	Hidamari Sketch × 365	Hiro	Also Specials	
2008	Black Butler	Mina		
2008	Hell Girl: Three Vessels	Mioi Hatsumi		
2008	Kyōran Kazoku Nikki	Raichō Hiratsuka		
2008	(Goku) Sayonara, Zetsubou-Sensei	Abiru Kobushi	Also OVA	
2009	The Melancholy of Haruhi-chan Suzumiya	Mikuru Asahina		
2009	Nyoro~n Churuya-san	Mikuru Asahina		
2009	The Melancholy of Haruhi Suzumiya (Season 2)	Mikuru Asahina		
2009	Queen's Blade: The Exiled Virgin	Menace		
2009	Tears to Tiara	Rhiannon		
2009	Crayon Shin-chan: Roar! Kasukabe Wild Kingdom	Victoria	Movie	
2009	(Zan) Sayonara, Zetsubou-Sensei	Abiru Kobushi		
2009	Code Geass: Lelouch of the Rebellion R2 Special Edition "Zero Requiem"	Anya Alstreim	OVA	
2009	AIKa ZERO	Shiratori Miyu	OVA	
2009	Queen's Blade 2: The Evil Eye	Menace		
2009	Kämpfer	Assistant Committee Chairperson		
2009	Shin Koihime Musō	Hinari		
2009	(Zan) Sayonara, Zetsubou-Sensei Bangaichi	Abiru Kobushi	OVA	
2010	Ladies versus Butlers!	Saori Shikikagami		
2010	Ōkami Kakushi	Kaori Mana		
2010	Hidamari Sketch × ☆☆☆	Hiro	Also Specials	
2010	The Disappearance of Haruhi Suzumiya	Mikuru Asahina		
2010	Arakawa Under the Bridge	Jacqueline		
2010	Shukufuku no Campanella	Avril	Also Specials and OVA	
2010	Queen's Blade: Beautiful Warriors	Menace	OVA	
2010	Arakawa Under the Bridge x Bridge	Jacqueline		
2011	Puella Magi Madoka Magica	Junko Kaname		
2011	Oretachi ni Tsubasa wa Nai	Naru Ōtori		
2011	Kämpfer für die Liebe	Assistant Committee Chairperson		
2011	Astarotte no Omocha!	Elíka Drakul Draupnils		
2011	Nyanpire	Chachamaru		
2011	Baby Princess 3D Paradise 0 [Love]	Haruka Amatsuka	OVA	
2011	Maji de Watashi ni Koishinasai!	Yukie Mayuzumi		
2011	Hidamari Sketch × SP	Hiro		
2012	Sket Dance	Luigiana		
2012	Code Geass: Nunnally in Wonderland	Anya Alstreim, White Rabbit	OVA	
2012	Hidamari Sketch × Honeycomb	Hiro		
2012	Puella Magi Madoka Magica the Movie Part 1: Beginnings	Junko Kaname	Recap Movie	
2012	Puella Magi Madoka Magica the Movie Part 2: Eternal	Junko Kaname	Recap Movie	
2013	Da Capo III	Rurika Ordet		
2013	Puella Magi Madoka Magica the Movie Part 3: Rebellion	Junko Kaname	Movie	
2013	Hidamari Sketch: Sae & Hiro's Graduation Arc	Hiro	OVA	
2014	In Search of the Lost Future	Shiori Sasaki		
2015	The Disappearance of Nagato Yuki-chan	Mikuru Asahina		
2015	Ninja Slayer From Animation	Maria Agata	ONA	
2015	The Asterisk War	Nana Anderson		
2015	Overlord	Bukubukuchagama		
2016	The Beheading Cycle: The Blue Savant and the Nonsense Bearer	Teruko	OVA	
2017	Miss Kobayashi's Dragon Maid	Georgie Saikawa, Schoolteacher, various background characters		
2017	Overlord: The Dark Warrior	Bukubukuchagama		
2018	Overlord II	Bukubukuchagama		
2018	Death March to the Parallel World Rhapsody	Mosa		
2018	Code Geass: Lelouch of the Rebellion II: Transgression	Anya Alstreim	Recap Movie	
2018	Muhyo & Roji's Bureau of Supernatural Investigation	Sophie		
2018	Code Geass: Lelouch of the Rebellion III: Glorification	Anya Alstreim	Recap Movie	
2018	Happy Sugar Life	Yūna Kōbe		
2019	Kedama no Gonjiro	Maoko		
2019	Why the Hell are You Here, Teacher!?	Mayu Matsukaze		
2019	Azur Lane	HMS Edinburgh		
2020	Interspecies Reviewers	Drone	Episode 9	
2021	Miss Kobayashi's Dragon Maid S	Georgie Saikawa		
2023	My Life as Inukai-san's Dog	Karen's Mother		
2025	City the Animation	Sumire Sakurakomi Tanabe		

=== Japanese dubs ===
- Courage the Cowardly Dog (Bunny)
- Hey Arnold! (Eugene Horowitz, Lulu and Lila Sawyer)
- Little Lulu (Annie)
- Carrie (Carrie White (young))
- Cry-Baby (Suzy Q.)

=== Video games ===
Year	Title	Role	Platform(s)	Source
1999	Puyo Puyo~n	Ar-chan	Dreamcast, Nintendo 64, PlayStation, Game Boy Color	
2001–2016	Simple Series	Riho Futaba	PlayStation, PlayStation 2, PlayStation 3, PlayStation 4, PlayStation Portable, PlayStation Vita, Dreamcast, GBA, DS, 3DS, Wii, Wii U	
2002	Suigetsu	Alice Kousaka	Windows	
2002	Riviera: The Promised Land	Cierra	WonderSwan Color, Game Boy Advance, PlayStation Portable	
2004	Shuffle!	Kaede Fuyou	Windows, PlayStation 2	
2004	Berserk Millennium Falcon Arc: Chapter of the Holy Demon War	Farnese	PlayStation 2	
2005	Mega Man Zero 4	Neige	Game Boy Advance	
2005	Lamune ~Garasubin ni Utsuru Umi~	Nanami Konoe	Windows, PlayStation 2	
2006	Summon Night 4	Pomnit	PlayStation 2, PlayStation Portable	
2007–2016	Quiz Magic Academy Series	Riel	Arcade, Nintendo DS	
2007	Narcissu: Side 2nd	Chihiro	Windows, Mac OS X, Linux	
2007	Shin Lucky Star Moe Drill Tabidachi	Ayano Minegishi	Nintendo DS	
2008	Mana Khemia 2: Fall of Alchemy	Chloe Hartog	PlayStation 2, PlayStation Portable, PlayStation Network	
2008	Tears to Tiara: Kakan no Daichi	Riannon	PlayStation 3, PlayStation Portable	
2008	Memories Off 6: T-wave	Chloe Kagamigawa	PlayStation 2, PlayStation 3, PlayStation Portable, PlayStation Vita, Xbox 360, iOS	
2010	Super Robot Wars L	Eida Rossa (from Dancouga Nova)	Nintendo DS	
2011	Code 18	Nanari Torikura	PlayStation Portable, Xbox 360, Windows	
2012	Puella Magi Madoka Magica Portable	Junko Kaname	PlayStation Portable	
2012	Duke Nukem Forever	Kate Holsom	Windows, OS X, PlayStation 3, Xbox 360	Japanese localisation
2017	Azur Lane	HMS Edinburgh (エディンバラ), HMS Fortune	iOS, Android	
2019	Shadowverse	Mikuru Asahina	(Note: Credited as Shino Kujō (九条信乃))	
2022	Blue Archive	Miyu Kasumizawa	iOS, Android	

==== Eroge ====
Year	Title	Role	Sources
2000	Rebirth	Miyuri Kagura	
2000	Calendar Girl	Rie Nakazato	
2000	Gin'iro	Sagiri	(Note: Credited as Ran Tōno (籐野らん))
2000	Prism Heart	Maple	
2001	Mizuiro	Hiyori Hayasaka	
2001–2005	NekoNeko Fan Discs 1-6	Hiyori Hayasaka	
2001	Nyante Chaton	Momo Hikone	
2001	Cosmic Man	Remi Kanzaki	
2001	Hooligan	Yuka Amou	
2002	426	Kaori Suma	
2002	Mikogami Aventure	Ai Minazuki	
2002	Haitoku	Haruka Matsuro	(Note: Credited as Umi Yanairyū (柳井流海))
2002	Lost Passage	Rino Natsukoshi	
2002	Trouble Captor!	Hane Kozuru	
2002	Sore wa Maichiru Sakura no Youni	Komachi Yukimura, Kazuto Saeki	
2002	Tenjou Ura kara Ai wo Komete	Maria Kisaragi	
2002	Pachi File	Reimi Kanzaki	
2002	Shuuchuu Chiryou Shitsu	Wakaba Kinoshita	
2002	Baldr Force	Liang	(Note: Credited as Aoi Sakuragi (桜木あおい))
2002	Sayorana Etranger	Haruka Kisaragi	
2003	Baldr Force EXE	Liang	
2003	Separate Blue	Tsubame Itabashi	
2003	Daisuki na Sensei ni H na Onedari Shichau Omase na Boku no / Watashi no Puni Puni	Keito Sakurazawa	
2003	Hajimete ga Ippai: Maidkko αβ	T-134a	
2003	Tsukushite Jan	Chiaki Kasai	
2003	Aka	Chuchu	
2003	3LDK	Yomogi Senowo	
2003	Castle Fantasia: Erencia Senki	Lewian Folm	
2003	Kono Sora ga Tsuieru Toki ni	Go Hinata	(Note: Credited as Sawa Ichii (市井紗和))
2003	Moonlight Renewal: Omoide no Hajimari	Yuri Hinama	
2003	Sukumizu: Fetish☆ ni Narumon!	Reika Kona Iwasaki	(Note: Credited as Sae Ichii (市井佐絵))
2003	Matsuyoigusa	Yuki Kambayashi	
2003	Manatsu no Tobira	Nanami Suibara	
2003	Hoshizora Planet: Dream Box	Satomi Takakura	
2003	Anonono.: Kimi to Sugoshita Ano Hi Ano Toki Ano Mirai	Fuuka Sumidagawa	
2003	Daibanchou -Big Bang Age-	Marishia, Burodokyasuko	
2003	Kodomo Milk Parfait	Aya Sakurai	(Note: Credited as Mai Tachibana (立花舞))
2004	Shizuku	Mizuho Aihara	
2004	Shuffle!	Kaede Kuyou	
2004	Deepblue Fandisk 11: Nin no Mune Kyun Love!	Rino Natsukoshi, Yomogi Senoo	
2004	DINGIR	Nisa	
2004	Shamana Shamana: Tsuki to Kokoro to Taiyou no Mahou	Aoife	
2004	Like Life	Tsubaki Sawaki	
2004	Onegai O-Hoshi-sama	Shirubyi	
2004	Doko e Iku no, Ano Hi	Kiriri Asou	
2004	Dear My Friend	Touko Kitazawa	
2004	Lamune	Nanami Konoe	
2004	Cage Boy's Heroine Selection	Keito Sakurazawa	
2004	Tokidoki Pakucchao!	Miyuki Hayakawa	
2005	MERI+DIA: Maria Diana	Rea Ayafuji	
2005	Milkyway3	Sakuya Mikage	
2005	Tears to Tiara	Rihannon, Primula	
2005	Ayakashibito	'Tonya' Antonina Antonovna Nikitina	
2005	Natsunone -Ring-	Saori Kazamatsuri	
2005	Shishunki	Nanami Konoe	
2005	Sharin no Kuni, Himawari no Shoujo	Ririko Higuchi	
2005	Himesho!	Pochi, Nakamotojima Sara	
2006	Harukoi Otome	Yuika Serizawa	
2006	AR: Wasurerareta Natsu	Kiyoshi Nakana	
2006	Muv-Luv Alternative	Mobukyara	
2006	Aozora no Mieru Oka	Nonoka Suwa	
2006	Princess Waltz	Suzushiro Shikikagura	
2006	Scarlett~Nichijō no Kyōkaisen~	Bettō Izumi Shizuka Scarlett	
2006	Iinchou wa Shounin Sezu!: It Is a Next Choice	Kuzushin Nagi	
2006	I”s Pure	Yuka Morisaki	
2006	Always: Futo, Ki ga Tsukeba Kimi to no Nichijou...	Chihiro Takanashi	
2006	Really? Really!	Kaede Fuyou	
2007	Sharin no Kuni, Yuukyuu no Shounenshoujo	Ririko Higuchi	
2007	Haruharo!	Ririki Akizuki	
2007	Kimi ga Aruji de Shitsuji ga Ore de	Miyu Kuonji	
2007	HoneyComing	Mika Ogata	
2007	Bullet Butlers	Valeria Forster	
2007	Nepon? x Raipon!	Citrus	
2007	Happy Margaret!	Mao Sakura	
2008	Chrono Belt: Ayakashibito & Bullet Butlers Crossover Disc	Valeria Forster	
2008	Oretachi ni Tsubasa wa Nai: Prelude	Otorina, Masato, Citrus	
2008	Shin Koihime Musou: Otome Ryouran Sangokushi Engi	Hoto	
2009	Oretachi ni Tsubasa wa Nai	Otorina, Masato	
2009	Shukufuku no Campanella	Avril	
2009	Maji de Watashi ni Koishinasai!	Yukie Mayuzuki, Matsukaze	
2009	Sorairo	Tsubame Tomosaka	
2009	Soukou Akki Muramasa	Hikaru Minato	
2009	Shuffle! Essence+	Kaede Fuyou	
2010	Mercuria: Mizu no Miyako ni Koi no Hanataba o	Fiorelea Imbruglia	
2010	Shin Koihime Musou: Moeshouden	Hoto	
2010	Oretachi ni Tsubasa wa Nai AfterStory	Otorina	
2010	Shukusai no Campanella!	Avril	
2010	Hello, Good-bye	Suguri Satome	
2010	Ore no Tsure wa Hito de nashi	Eimeiyo	
2010	Sekai Seifuku Kanojo	Yumeko Yamino	
2011	White: blanche comme la lune	Magical Girl	
2011	Shuffle! Love Rainbow	Kaede Fuyou	
2011	Love-Bride Eve	Chiyo Hisuda	
2011	Appare! Tenka Gomen	Aya Igarashi	
2011	Manatsu no Yoru no Yuki Monogatari	Koromo Kazamatsuri	
2012	Maji de Watashi ni Koishinasai! S	Yukie Mayuzuki, Matsukaze	
2012	JOKER -Shisen no Hate no Doukeshi-	Hajime Aizawa	
2013–2016	Maji de Watashi ni Koishinasai! A-1—5	Yukie Mayuzumi	
2015	Anekouji Naoko to Gin'iro no Shinigami	Shibuki Konuta	
2015	Shin Koihime † Eiyuutan	Shigen Houtou	
2015	Oni Seiyoku	Sakura Wakimiya	
2016	Maji de Watashi ni Koishinasai!! SPARK	Yukie Mayuzumi	
2016	D.C. III ~Da Capo III~ With You	Rurika Ordet, Marika Shirakawa	
2016	Maji de Watashi ni Koishinasai! A Plus Disk	Yukie Mayuzumi	
2017	Lamune 2	Nanami Nakazato, Cafe Mother	
2017	Shin Koihime † Musou -Kakumei- Souten no Haou	Shigen Houtou	
2017	Minato Carnival FD	Shibuki Konuta, Yukie Mayuzumi	
2018	Shin Koihime † Musou -Kakumei- Son Go no Ketsumyaku	Shigen Houtou	
2019	Shin Koihime † Musou -Kakumei- Ryuuki no Taimou	Shigen Houtou	

=== Theme song performance ===
- Fushigiboshi no Futagohime (ED1)
- The Melancholy of Haruhi Suzumiya (OP1/ED)
- Special A (OP1/ED2)
- Kimi ga Aruji de Shitsuji ga Ore de (ED1)
- Zoku Sayonara Zetsubou Sensei (ED1)
- Lovedol~Lovely Idol~ (OP/ED/single)
