= Marriage Royale =

Japanese manga series

- Marriage Royale manga volume 1.

マリッジロワイヤル (Marijji Rowaiyaru)
- Genre: Harem
- Light novel
- Written by: Shingo Hifumi
- Illustrated by: Aoi Nishimata; Hiro Suzuhira
- Published by: ASCII Media Works
- Magazine: Dengeki G's Magazine
- Original run: January 2006 – May 2011
- Manga
- Written by: Navel
- Illustrated by: Koko Natsuki
- Published by: ASCII Media Works
- Magazine: Dengeki G's Magazine
- Original run: April 2007 – January 2011
- Volumes: 7
- Manga

Marriage Royale: Prism Story
- Written by: Navel
- Illustrated by: Junka Morozumi
- Published by: ASCII Media Works
- Magazine: Dengeki G's Festival! Comic
- Original run: October 26, 2009 – present
- Video game

Marriage Royale: Prism Story
- Publisher: ASCII Media Works
- Genre: Visual novel
- Platform: PlayStation Portable
- Released: April 28, 2010

Marriage Royale (マリッジロワイヤル, Marijji Rowaiyaru) is a series of illustrated Japanese fictional short stories written by Shingo Hifumi and illustrated by Aoi Nishimata and Hiro Suzuhira; both illustrators are from Navel. The short stories ran as part of a reader-participation game in the Japanese bishōjo magazine Dengeki G's Magazine, published by ASCII Media Works, between the January 2006 and May 2011 issues. A manga titled Marriage Royale based on the short stories, illustrated by Koko Natsuki from Lime, was serialized between the April 2007 and January 2011 issues of Dengeki G's Magazine. A second manga titled Marriage Royale: Prism Story illustrated by Junka Morozumi started serialization in Dengeki G's Festival! Comic on October 26, 2009.

== Plot ==
Marriage Royale's story revolves around the male protagonist, a high school student named Tsukasa Hinomoto, who is told one day by his parents that he was adopted. Furthermore, they tell him that his real father is a manager of a large company, meaning he is very rich and holds a lot of power. Tsukasa's real father wants his son to marry a good woman, so he sets up an event known as Marriage Royale where beautiful girls from all over Japan will come together at a school built especially for the event and vie to become Tsukasa's fiancée. The school is located on an isolated island near Japan, and Tsukasa himself is taken there to live in a mansion in the care of two twin maids: Miku, the elder sister, and Miu, the younger sister.

== Characters ==
=== Main characters ===
Tsukasa Hinomoto (日乃本 司, Hinomoto Tsukasa)
Tsukasa is the protagonist of the story. He is the one all the bride candidates are trying to marry once the "Marriage Royale" is finished.

Miku (美久)
Voiced by: Haruka Tomatsu
Miku is one half of the maid twins, the other being her younger sister Miu. She works for Tsukasa's father, and takes care of the mansion where he lives.

Miu (美宇)
Voiced by: Natsuko Kuwatani
Miu is the younger sister of Miku, her twin sister, and fellow maid of the mansion where Tsukasa lives. She is in charge of educating Tsukasa in a more proper upbringing.

=== Bride candidates ===
Minato Daiba (大場 湊, Daiba Minato)
Voiced by: Ami Koshimizu
Minato is from Tokyo; her name comes from Minato, Tokyo, and Odaiba. She is Tsukasa's childhood friend, and since she is prone to making silly mistakes, she sometimes appears younger than she is. She has known Tsukasa since they were in kindergarten, and went to the same junior-high, and high schools, and plans to go to the same university as him too.

Minami Umeda (宇目田 深波, Umeda Minami)
Voiced by: Mayumi Yoshida
Minami is from Osaka Prefecture; her name comes from Namba, which is also known as Minami, and Umeda. She and Tsukasa went to the same elementary school together, and Tsukasa developed his first crush on her. Despite being from Osaka, she can speak both standard Japanese dialect, and Kansai dialect, which is the main dialect of the region in and around Osaka. She has a high interest in fashion and styles of clothing.

Komachi Akita (秋田 小町, Akita Komachi)
Voiced by: Mai Nakahara
Komachi is from Akita Prefecture; her name comes from a brand in rice in Japan known as Akitakomachi. Her family holds friendly relations with Tsukasa's birth-family and is a typical daughter of a distinguished family. She was originally brought up to become Tsukasa's fiancé.

Otoha Shinjo (新城 音羽, Shinjō Otoha)
Voiced by: Eri Kitamura
Otoha is from Aichi Prefecture; her name comes from Otowa, Aichi, and Shinshiro, Aichi. She is the niece of Tsukasa's adoptive parents, making her his cousin, though she also seems like a younger sister to him. She is generally innocent, though is also selfish and has an evil-streak.

Miyako Asakura (朝倉 美弥子, Asakura Miyako)
Voiced by: Minako Kotobuki
Miyako is from Fukuoka Prefecture; her name comes from Miyako, Fukuoka, and Asakura, Fukuoka. She has a doting father, which humbles her view of male society. She hates to lose in anything, and when engaged in a challenge, she will stop at nothing to win. She typically has a cold attitude towards Tsukasa, giving her a tsundere personality.

Yakumo Hidaka (日高 八雲, Hidaka Yakumo)
Voiced by: Ayahi Takagaki
Yakumo is from Hokkaidō; her name comes from Yakumo, Hokkaidō, and Hidaka, Hokkaidō. She is a hard person to figure out, and others do not readily know her intentions; part of the reason for this is that she dresses in a Gothic Lolita style of clothing. She is generally indifferent about the world around her, and can be blunt.

Sera Saeki (佐伯 世羅, Saeki Sera)
Voiced by: Miyu Matsuki
Sera is from Hiroshima Prefecture; her name comes from Sera, Hiroshima, and Saeki-ku, Hiroshima. Due to a traumatic event when she was a child, she has developed a fear of men. This fear is expressed especially in closed spaces near men, such as in elevators, or packed trains. She likes to collect stuffed toys and dolls, and generally likes things that are considered cute.

Asahi Sanjo (三条 朝日, Sanjō Asahi)
Voiced by: Rika Morinaga
Asahi is from Niigata Prefecture; her name comes from Asahi, Niigata, and Sanjō, Niigata. She was raised by her father, and due to his influence, dresses and acts like a male, rarely wearing feminine attire.

Ena Tenryū (天竜 江奈, Tenryū Ena)
Voiced by: Ryoko Shintani
Ena is from Shizuoka Prefecture; her name comes from the Tenryū-ku ward of Hamamatsu. During her junior-high school years, she was a junior of Minami Umeda, but afterwards transferred to Shizuoka Prefecture. She is usually a cheerful girl who is frank and manages the soccer club.

Iyo Uwajima (宇和島 伊予, Uwajima Iyo)
Voiced by: Aki Toyosaki
Iyo is from Ehime Prefecture; her name comes from Iyo, Ehime, and Uwajima, Ehime. Despite being eighteen-years-old, she comes off as an older gyaru-like girl. She is the eldest of four sisters and likes to look after her younger siblings. She has the tendency to get wild ideas and can be seen as unreliable.

Ebino Hamayū (浜木綿 えびの, Hamayū Ebino)
Voiced by: Yuko Goto
Ebino is from Miyazaki Prefecture; her name comes from Ebino, Miyazaki, and the Japanese name for the Poisonbulb flower. She has a bit of an evil-streak and is maniacal about many hobbies. She likes to call Tsukasa "Darling", and is the shortest of the bride candidates.

Uruma Nago (名護 うるま, Nago Uruma)
Voiced by: Minori Chihara
Uruma is from Okinawa Prefecture; her name comes from Nago, Okinawa, and Uruma, Okinawa. She is the youngest child from a large, poor family. Due to a simplistic life with little to no luxuries, she was able to focus mainly on her school work and gets good grades because of it. She likes to refer to Tsukasa as "Onii-san", meaning "older brother".

== Media ==
=== Books and publications ===
Marriage Royale began as a reader-participation game in the January 2006 issue of ASCII Media Works' Dengeki G's Magazine, where the profiles of two girls, Minato Daiba and Minami Umeda, were supplied for the reader. After reading the profiles, the reader could illustrate what they wanted the girls to look like, and send it in; out of all the entries, two were chosen for each girl, and the attributes of both were combined to create a single character design illustrated by either Aoi Nishimata, or Hiro Suzuhira. Both illustrators are from Navel, which is also known for producing the visual novels Shuffle!, and Soul Link. Every three months, two new profiles were published, and this pattern continued until the fourth round with eight girls at the time. The second round introduced Komachi Akita, and Otoha Shinjo; the third round brought in Miyako Asakura, and Yamuko Hidaka; and the fourth round had Sera Saeki, and Asahi Sanjo. In the September 2007 issue, four more profiles were published, with the same rules applying as with the previous rounds; the fifth round covered Ena Tenryū, Iyo Uwajima, Ebino Hamayū, and Uruma Nago. Aoi Nishimata has provided illustrations for Miku, Minami, Komachi, Yakumo, Sera, Iyo, and Ebino; Hiro Suzuhira drew Miu, Minato, Otoha, Miyako, Asahi, Ena, and Uruma.

The short stories themselves, written by Shingo Hifumi, are more or less vignettes where each one gives a very brief glimpse of a scene between the protagonist, and the given heroine he is with in the story. The stories are accompanied by illustrations of the given heroine, and are drawn by either Aoi Nishimata, or Hiro Suzuhira depending on which artist originally drew which girl. The first batch of stories, serialized between the May 2006 and March 2007 issues, was under the collective title Girl's Heart, and contained eight chapters, one for each of the first eight heroines. A second batch under the general title Dearest Stories was serialized between the October 2007 and October 2008 issues and contained 13 chapters. The project ended in the May 2011 issue.

Two light novels titled Marriage Royale written by Shingo Hifumi were published by ASCII Media Works under their Dengeki Bunko imprint between March 10 and September 10, 2010.

=== Manga ===
The Marriage Royale manga, illustrated by Koko Natsuki of Lime, was serialized between the April 2007 and January 2011 issues of Dengeki G's Magazine, published by ASCII Media Works. Seven tankōbon volumes were released between October 27, 2007, and January 27, 2011, under ASCII Media Works' Dengeki Comics imprint. A second manga titled Marriage Royale: Prism Story illustrated by Junka Morozumi started serialization in ASCII Media Works' Dengeki G's Festival! Comic on October 26, 2009. The first volume of Prism Story was released on January 27, 2011.
