= Nee Pon? × Rai Pon! =

2007 Japanese visual novel video game

- Developers: Navel, Lime
- Platform: Windows
- Release: August 31, 2007
- Genres: Eroge, Mahjong, Visual novel
- Mode: Single player

Nee Pon? × Rai Pon! (ね〜PON?×らいPON!, Nēpon Raipon) is a Japanese visual novel developed by Navel and its sister company, Lime. The game, made for Windows, was adult-only and was released on August 31, 2007. The "Pon"'s in the title refer to the term pong in the strategy game mahjong. This is due to an element in the gameplay of Nee Pon? × Rai Pon! where the player gets to play mahjong against the computer. The mahjong tiles in the game contain images of the characters from Shuffle! and Soul Link, two previous titles by Navel.

== Plot ==
When a teenage boy named Masato suddenly wakes up, he finds himself in a strange world. He does not remember anything from his past except for his name. When he is at a loss what to do, a young girl suddenly appears in front of him. According to her, this world has been created to celebrate Navel's four year anniversary and Lime's one year anniversary, and he has been invited to the world as a guest. Though he does not know what is going on, he gradually gets involved in the festival.

== Characters ==
Each of the characters work at a restaurant, and are divided according to where they are employed. These restaurants are: Candy House (キャンディハウス, Kyandi Hausu), Fruits Party (フルーツパーティ, Furūtsu Pāti), Mix Juice (ミックスジュース, Mikkusu Jūsu), Cocktail Party (カクテルパーティ, Kakuteru Pāti), and Daughter Daughter Tea House (娘々茶館, Nyannyan Chakan). In addition to the original characters to Nee Pon? × Rai Pon!, the three Navel Girls and Lime Girls who were created as mascots of Navel and Lime, also appear in the game. Most of the girls are named after food.

=== Candy House ===
Character design by: Aoi Nishimata

Marron (マロン, Maron)
Voiced by: Minami Hokuto
Éclair (エクレア, Ekurea)
Voiced by: Rumiko Sasa
Madeleine (マドレーヌ, Madorēnu)
Voiced by: Tae Kumegawa
Tiramisu (ティラミス)
Voiced by: Oto Agumi
Citrus (シトラス, Shitorasu)
Voiced by: Ran Tōno
Ponkan (ポンカン)
Voiced by: Natsuki Yoshino

=== Fruits Party ===
Character design by: Hiro Suzuhira

Karin (花梨)
Voiced by: Ayaka Kimura
Natsume (夏姫)
Voiced by: Yuki Iwata
Reishi (玲紫)
Voiced by: Hikaru Kaga
Ringo (林檎)
Voiced by: Chisato Suzumori
Minneola (ミネオラ, Mineora)
Voiced by: Takako Kudō

=== Mix Juice ===
Character design by: Koko Natsuki

Cocoa (ココア, Kokoa)
Voiced by: Himeka
Carrot (キャロット, Kyarotto)
Voiced by: Miyako Suzuta
Ramune (ラムネ)
Voiced by: Rino Ayakawa
Resuka (レスカ)
Voiced by: Mai Akizuki
Kanna (柑奈)
Voiced by: Chana Nukumoto

=== Cocktail Party ===
Character design by: Rio Hazumi

Kahlúa (カルア, Karua)
Voiced by: Rita
Rusty (ラスティ, Rasuti)
Voiced by: Sumire Murasakibana
Gimlet (ギムレット, Gimuretto)
Voiced by: Honoka Imuraya
Xinglu (杏露, Shinrū)
Voiced by: Ayumu Yamamoto
Kikka (橘香)
Voiced by: Haruka Kawai

=== Daughter Daughter Tea House ===
Zero (ゼロ)
Character design by: Genshō Sugiyama
Voiced by: Erena Kaibara
Shiden (シデン)
Character design by: Akito Amakawa
Voiced by: Mayumi Shindō
Hien (ヒエン)
Character design by: Akane Ikegami
Voiced by: Haruka Fushimi
Meteor (ミーティア, Mītia)
Character design by: Mamoru Naruse
Voiced by: Aya
Comet (コメット, Kometto)
Character design by: Chiaki Hasekura
Voiced by: Miruku Shiratori
Saetta (サエッタ)
Character design by: Aoi Kimizuka
Voiced by: Yuraka Muzaki

== Music ==
A single album published by King Records will be released on September 26, 2007, containing the game's two theme songs sung by Nomico: "Girl Fantasy" (女の子ファンタジー, Onnanoko Fantajī), and "Dream-colored Fireworks" (夢色花火, Yumeiro Hanabi).
