= Yuria =

Japanese musician and voice actress

YURIA (born October 10, 1967) is a musician and voice actress from Osaka Prefecture, Japan.

She was the lead vocalist and guitarist for Honey Bee, currently she is the lead vocalist and bassist for the Japanese punk rock band Pinky Doodle Poodle. She is also the voice actress for Ama Shigure in the anime Shuffle! and its associated eroge video game.

== Discography ==
=== YURIA ===
==== Singles ====
- WISH (released November 22, 2002)
1. WISH — anime television series Choujuushin Gravion ending theme
2. KISS ME — anime television series Choujuushin Gravion insert song
- YOU (released August 3, 2005)
1. YOU — anime television series Shuffle! opening theme
2. colorful
- ORIGINAL! (released November 23, 2005)
1. ORIGINAL! — PS2 game Shuffle! On The Stage opening theme
2. mermaid blue
- Remember Memories (released November 22, 2006)
1. Remember Memories — PC game Really? Really! opening theme
2. Happy Go Lucky Days

==== Album ====
- YURIA (released February 22, 2006)
1. Dream & Love
2. Dakishimete (Honey Bee) — PC game ENSEMBLE ~maichiru hane no ensemble~ opening theme
3. Kimi ni Futatabi Aeta Kiseki — PC game Boy Meets Girl opening theme
4. Aozora — anime television series Green Green ending theme
5. LA♪LA♪BYE (Honey Bee) — anime television series Choujuushin Gravion Zwei ending theme
6. Daiji Da.i.ji — anime television series Mahoraba Heartful Days opening theme
7. Nukegake Shinai de — anime television series Onegai Twins image song
8. Mirage Lullaby — PC game Shuffle! opening theme (2004)
9. You make my day! — PC game Otome wa Boku ni Koishiteru opening theme
10. WISH
11. YOU - anime television series Shuffle! Opening thème
12. Monochrome (Studio Live Ver.) — PC game Green Green Midori ending theme
13. baby kiss
- YURIA2 (released November 21, 2007)
1. never say goodbye — PC game Tick! Tack! ending theme
2. LAST SUMMER — PC game Natsumegu insert song
3. Look at me — anime television series School Days ending theme
4. Fateful Encounters — anime television series Shuffle! Memories opening theme
5. Koe ga Kikoeru — PC game Reconquista insert song
6. AROUND THE WORLD — PC game Edelweiss ending theme
7. Remember Memories — PC game Really? Really! opening theme
8. Natsumegu — PC game Natsumegu opening theme
9. Natsu no Melody — PC game Natsumelo opening theme
10. ORIGINAL! — PS2 game SHUFFLE! On The Stage opening theme
11. Shouten no Niji — PS2 game Katakamuna ~ushinawareta ingatsu~ theme song
12. NO ROCK NO LIFE (Honey Bee) — anime television series Sumomo mo Momo mo ~Chijou Saikyou no Yome~ first ending theme
13. 120-en no Haru — PS2 game 120-en no Haru theme song
14. Shampoo shiteageru

=== Honey Bee ===
==== Singles ====
- LA♪LA♪BYE (released February 25, 2004)
1. LA♪LA♪BYE — anime television series Choujuushin Gravion Zwei ending theme
2. soul★mate
- Plastic Smile (Nijiiro Guitar VERSION) (released October 28, 2005)
1. Plastic Smile (Nijiiro Guitar VERSION) — anime television series Canvas 2 ~Niji Iro no Sketch~ opening theme
2. BLUE SKY — PS2 game Canvas 2 ~Niji Iro no Sketch~ opening theme
- NO ROCK NO LIFE (released November 22, 2006)
1. NO ROCK NO LIFE — anime television series Sumomo mo Momo mo ~Chijou Saikyou no Yome~ first ending theme
2. Guitar Satsujin Jiken

==== Album ====
- Honey Bee 1 (released July 26, 2006)
1. Sepia Color no Meiro o Nukete — PC/PS2 game Tamakyuu opening theme
2. Plastic Smile (Nijiiro Guitar VERSION) — Canvas2 PC/Anime opening theme
3. Dakishimete — PC game ENSEMBLE ~maichiru hane no ensemble~ opening theme
4. Cherry Jam — PC/PS2 game Cherrish Pizza wa Ikaga desu ka♥ opening theme
5. soul★mate
6. BANG-SO-CO — PC/PS2 game Tamakyuu ending theme
7. BLUE SKY — Canvas2 PS2 version opening theme
8. Colorful Candy — PC game Natsukoi ending theme
9. RIDE ON
10. Eien no Kizuna — PC game Tenkuu no Sinfonia ending theme
11. LA♪LA♪BYE
12. Mune Kyun Sapuri — PC game Tenkuu no Sinfonia 2 opening theme
13. forever
14. SUMMER RAINBOW — PC game Natsukoi opening theme

=== Doutonbori Divers ===
- 2004-08-15: Ajiwatte Mitai
- 2005-03-25: DO-born
- 2006-09-30: Ouch!

=== Sweets Tankentai ===
- 2005-11-25: NA NA IRO — anime television series Canvas 2 ~Nijiiro no Sketch~ ending theme

=== Pinky Doodle Poodle ===
- 2014-04-22: Pinky Doodle Poodle — full-length album
- 2015-10-16: Inside is Out — full-length album
