= Shuffle! Love Rainbow =

2011 video game

- Developer(s): Navel
- Publisher(s): Navel (PC)
- Series: Shuffle!
- Platform(s): Windows
- Release: April 28, 2011
- Genre(s): Eroge, visual novel

Shuffle! Love Rainbow is the fourth eroge visual novel in the Shuffle! series created by Navel for Microsoft Windows. It is a continuation of Kaede's path from Really? Really! or Sia's path from Shuffle! Essence+, or Primula's path from Shuffle! Last storyline is the Ruri Matsuri's path, which takes place at the same time as the storylines from Shuffle!

== Gameplay ==
When a player starts the game there are only three paths to choose from: Sia's, Primula's and Kaede's. Each storyline is an after story: Kaede's path takes place at the time of school festival, in Primula's path the main heroine would like to be seen more like a girl not a kid, and in the third storyline Sia and Kikyou have a few problems. When the player finishes the first three paths, a fourth storyline becomes available. This follows the story of Ruri, which is a romantic story like the paths from Shuffle!, and it's quite different from Ruri's side story from Shuffle! Essence+. In this game there are no further choices once the initial path is chosen.

== Characters ==
=== Main characters ===
Rin
The protagonist of the previous games. The player assumes the role of Rin.

Kaede
The main female character of the second story. She wants to go to the school festival with Rin.

Primula
The main female character of the third story. She wants Rin to think of her as a girl.

Sia
The main female character of the first story. She just wants to be with Rin.

Ruri
The main female character of the fourth story. She falls in love with Rin, but is really shy, which is why their romance needs time to develop. This is the first game with Ruri's H (hentai) scenes.

=== Secondary characters ===
Nerine
The King of Devils' daughter and Sia's cousin.

Asa
Rin and Kaede's friend from school.

Kareha
Asa and Ruri's classmate and friend.

Mayumi
Rin and Kaede's classmate and bad friend.

Itsuki
Rin and Kaede's classmate and bad friend.

Nadeshiko
Rin and Kaede's homeroom teacher.

Daisy
Sia's cousin on her father's side.

== Music ==
Opening Theme: Summer Again, by YURIA.

Ending Theme: Primary, by Miyuki Hashimoto.
