= Aoi Nishimata =

Japanese visual novel character designer

- 西又葵
- Born: June 4, 1977 (age 49)
- Occupations: Visual novel character designer and illustrator
- Employer: Navel
- Notable work: Shuffle!, We Without Wings

Aoi Nishimata (西又葵, Nishimata Aoi) (born June 4, 1977) is a Japanese visual novel character designer and illustrator who works for Navel.

Hiro Suzuhira and Aoi Nishimata have known each other from high school; their first work, Ritual, was introduced in 1996. In 2003, she joined Navel along with Hiro Suzuhira, illustrating Shuffle!. She then went on to make Really? Really! and We Without Wings (Oretachi ni Tsubasa wa Nai).

On April 23, 2016, Nishimata announced her marriage to voice actor Junichi Miyake via her blog. The ceremony was held on May 5, 2015, at Tokyo Disneyland. Nishimata also announced that she published a book containing wedding photo and an essay, titled "Nishimata Aoi ga Dansei Seiyū to no Kekkon o Kimeta Riyū" (西又葵が男性声優との結婚を決めた理由, lit. 'Why Aoi Nishimata Decided to Marry a Voice Actor') on June 24, 2016.

== Works ==
=== Video games ===
List of works in video games
Year	Series	Crew role	Publisher, Notes	Source
2000	Natsuiro kenjutsu komachi	Character design and drafts	NEC IC	
2001	21-Two One-	Character design and original illustration	Basil and PrincessSoft	
2002	Cherry Petals Fall Like Teardrops	Character design and original illustration	Basil	
2004–09	Shuffle!	Character design and original illustration	Navel, also On the Stage, Essence+ and other ports	
2004	Final Approach	Character design and drafts	PrincessSoft	
2005	Lovely Idol	Character design and drafts	PrincessSoft	
2006–09	Really? Really!	Character design and original illustration	Navel, also DS version and other ports	
2007	Nee Pon? × Rai Pon!	Character design and original illustration	Navel	
2008	Oretachi ni Tsubasa wa Nai ~Prelude~	Character design and original illustration	Navel	
2009	We Without Wings	Character design and original illustration	Navel, also updates and PS3 and Vita ports	
2010	Marriage Royale: Prism Story	Character design	ASCII Media Works	
2010	Hello Kitty to Issho: Block Crash 123!	Character design and illustration for Urarayu Ichihana	Nishimata's Kittyler, Sanrio	
2010	Oretachi ni Tsubasa wa Nai ~After Story~	Character design and original illustration	Navel	
2010	Sekai Seifuku Kanojo	Character design and original illustration	Navel	
	Bless: Close Your Eyes, Open Your Mind	Character design, coloring, and original illustration	Basil	

=== Anime ===
List of works in anime
Year	Series	Crew role	Notes	Source
2004	Final Approach	Original character design		
2005	Shuffle!	Original Illustration		
2006	Lovely Idol	Original character design		
2007	Shuffle! Memories	Original character design		
2011	We Without Wings	Character Editor, Producer	Also ending song lyrics "Paranoia"	

=== Books ===
List of works in books
Year	Title	Role	Publisher	Notes	Source
1998	West again	Author	Akane Comics	Nishimata's first book	
2001–04	Men's Young	Cover art	Futabasha	December 2001 to September 2004 issues	
2001–04	Lovely Idol: Lovery Idol	Original Character design and illustration	Magi-Cu	light novels	
2005	Judgement Chime ja:ジャッジメントちゃいむ	Character design and illustration	ja:E☆2		
2006–11	Marriage Royale	Character design and illustration	Dengeki G's Magazine	light novels	
2006–07	Lovely Idol: New Lyrics	Character design and illustration	Magical Cute	light novels	
2009	Nyandafuru!! にゃんだふる!!	Author	Asuka shinsha	Animal photo book	
2009	I'm Aoi Nishimata	Author	Asuka shinsha	Illustration book	
2009	Koharu bara hiyori no ikusei nikki ja:小春原日和の育成日記	Authored by Yusaku Igarashi, Illustrated by Nishimata	Dengeki		
2010	Vivid	Author	Kadokawa Shoten	Nishimata's first art book	

==== Contributor ====
- Star Wars Art: Visions (2010)
- Higashi Nihon Daishinsai Charity Dōjinshi (The Great Eastern Japan Earthquake Charity Dojinshi) (2011)
