= We Without Wings =

Japanese visual novel and its adaptations

- The original visual novel cover.

俺たちに翼はない
- Genre: Romance, Comedy drama, Slice of Life, Fantasy
- Video game
- Developer: Navel
- Publisher: Navel
- Genre: Visual novel, eroge
- Platform: Microsoft Windows, PlayStation 3, PlayStation Vita
- Released: Microsoft Windows: JP: January 30, 2009; PlayStation 3, PlayStation Vita: JP: March 13, 2014
- Anime television series
- Directed by: Shinji Ushiro
- Produced by: Makoto Itō; Asuka Yamazaki; Yūka Sakurai; Tetsuko Kotani; Aoi Nishimata; Akihiko Okada; Tsuyoshi Kuwabara
- Written by: Takamitsu Kōno
- Music by: Acchorike
- Studio: Nomad
- Licensed by: AU: Madman Anime (Note: Under Madman Entertainment ownership until 2019.); NA: Funimation Entertainment; UK: MVM Films
- Original network: AT-X, CTC, GBS, Mie TV, SUN-TV, Tokyo MX, TV Saitama
- Original run: April 4, 2011 – June 20, 2011
- Episodes: 12 + OVA

We Without Wings (俺たちに翼はない, Oretachi ni Tsubasa wa Nai), taglined Under the innocent sky., is the fifth visual novel developed by Navel. Before the game's release, a prequel game named Oretachi ni Tsubasa wa Nai ~Prelude~ containing bonus scenarios and events before the timeline of the game was released on June 28, 2008. This release did not contain hentai scenes. The limited edition of the game was released on 30 January 2009. A standard version of the game was released on 24 April 2009. A fandisc named Oretachi ni Tsubasa wa Nai AfterStory was released on July 30, 2010. A non-adult version remake, titled Oretachi ni Tsubasa wa Nai R, of the Windows game was released on May 27, 2011.

The game has also received several manga adaptations. An anime adaptation by the studio Nomad started airing on April 4, 2011. In the English-speaking regions, We Without Wings is licensed by Crunchyroll for home video and streaming.

Set in Yanagihara, the series tells the story about the masses of people and buildings make it a bustling place to exist, and yet, people will meet and fall in love here in this city.

== Plot ==
It is winter in the big city of Yanagihara, and young people will meet and fall in love. Takashi Haneda is a teenage boy who plans to escape to another world, but is held back by thoughts of his younger sister Kobato Haneda and his girlfriend Asuka Watarai. Shūsuke Chitose is a poor part-timer who has to work with student-author Hiyoko Tamaizumi in spite of their initial dislike for each other. The antisocial Hayato Narita makes his living as a handyman until he is visited by a girl named Naru Ohtori.

The anime series is split into three separate vignettes covering the activities of three main groups of people. The first has Takashi Haneda as the main male lead and is focused around his school activities and direct acquaintances. The second has Shūsuke Chitose as the main male lead and is focused around a bar called Alexander and his direct acquaintances. The third has Hayato Narita as the main male lead and focuses on his street acquaintances. As the series progresses, the vignettes become more complex and intertwined, while still being presented in chronological order. Some offshoot stories are told, but they have direct connection to the above three main male characters.

== Characters ==
=== Main characters ===
The main characters include the main male leads and the main heroines of the series who appear in each or all of the vignettes.

Takashi Haneda (羽田 鷹志, Haneda Takashi)
Voiced by: Hiro Shimono (Japanese); Joel McDonald (English)
The main male lead for the school vignette, who goes to a high school in Yanagihara city. He considers himself a hero of a fantasy realm of Gredaguard for which he "escapes" to frequently, going by the name Lord Hawk Cyan-Blue. He befriends Asuka and pretends to be her boyfriend as a favor to her. As the series progresses, it is revealed that his illness is somehow connected to his "escapes", and thinks he is a knight from Gredaguard. He has no knowledge of the other male protagonists. He is named after Tokyo's main domestic airport Tokyo International Airport, commonly known as Haneda Airport.
Asuka Watarai (渡来 明日香, Watarai Asuka)
Voiced by: Misono Moriya (Windows) / Mayumi Yoshida (Drama CD and anime), Felecia Angelle (English, anime)
Takashi's classmate, part of the school vignette. She asked him to be her fake boyfriend because she was tired of rejecting all the guys who asked her out. She suffered a split personality illness when she was a child, however has recovered from it. She also wants to help Takashi with his illness, for which she is seen later confronting the latter about it without knowing a secret only known by Kobato and the other main male leads.
Shūsuke Chitose (千歳 鷲介, Chitose Shūsuke)
Voiced by: Hiroaki Miura (Japanese); Ricco Fajardo (English)
The main male lead for the bar vignette, who is a poor part-timer at Alexander. He also does freelance reporting and book reviewing. Kakeru Ohtori is a good friend of his and knows of his special nickname, Eagle. He befriends Hiyoko at Alexander. He knows of both Hayato Narita and Takashi, even conspiring with Hayato at times to help Takashi, unbeknownst to the latter. He is named after New Chitose Airport in Sapporo, Hokkaido.
Hiyoko Tamaizumi (玉泉 日和子, Tamaizumi Hiyoko)
Voiced by: Nazuna Gogyō (Windows) / Ryōko Ono (Drama CD and anime), Michelle Rojas (Note: Credited as Milly Prower) (English, anime)
Shūsuke's coworker, part of the bar vignette. She is an aspiring novelist who thinks her books will be a success in the future, occasionally writing under the pseudonyms Tama Izumi and Tamaki Hosokawa. She eventually takes a job at Alexander to help with her income.
Hayato Narita (成田 隼人, Narita Hayato)
Voiced by: Junichi Suwabe (Japanese); Scott Freeman (English)
The main male lead of the street vignette, who is a handyman with an antisocial personality. He is also known as Dracula or Drac for short due to only "appearing" at night. His nickname with a few of his "old" friends is Falcon. He befriends Naru while being hired to help her find her bicycle. He knows of both Shūsuke and Takashi, even conspiring with Shūsuke at times to help Takashi, unbeknownst to the latter. He is named after Tokyo's main international airport Narita International Airport.
Naru Ohtori (鳳 鳴, Ōtori Naru)
Voiced by: Ran Tōno (Windows) / Yūko Gotō (Drama CD and anime), Jad Saxton (English, anime)
A young high school girl and Kakeru's younger sister, part of the street vignette. She is a cheerful airhead and, despite her appearance, quite acute. She asks Hayato, her romantic interest, to help her look for her lost bicycle. She has a fetish for worker uniforms.
Kobato Haneda (羽田 小鳩, Haneda Kobato)
Voiced by: Yui Minasegawa (Windows) / Ai Matayoshi (Drama CD and anime), Mary Morgan (English, anime)
A first year middle school student and is the younger sister of Takashi and Yōji, part of all the vignettes. She knows everything about her brother, including the fact that he has multiple personalities.
Yōji Haneda (羽田 鷹志, Haneda Yōji)
Voiced by: Tsubasa Yonaga (Japanese); Kim Foster (English)
The older brother of Kobato seen in between vignettes watching the main male leads on an orange TV in a secluded place, and it is implied that his hand is the one changing the channel each time.

=== Supporting characters ===
The supporting characters include the supporting male characters and the sub-heroines of the series who appear in one or two of the vignettes.

Kakeru Ohtori (鳳 翔, Ōtori Kakeru)
Voiced by: Satoshi Hino (Japanese); Jason Liebrecht (English)
He is originally presented as two different people using the same name, but it is later revealed that he has a split personality. In the bar vignette, he is supposedly the ladies man who hangs out with Shūsuke at Alexander. In the street vignette, he is referred to as Phoenix, the crazy leader of the Yanagihara Flame Birds, and he is an old friend of Hayato, whom he refers to as Falcon. As the series progresses, the delineation between his personalities is not ruled by the separation of the vignettes.
Karuo Karube (軽部 狩男, Karube Karuo)
Voiced by: Hideo Ishikawa (Japanese); David Wald (English)
In the bar vignette, he is a perverted bartender who works at Alexander. He hires Shūsuke as a waiter to be trained under Hiyoko.
Eriko Hino (日野 英里子, Hino Eriko)
Voiced by: Don Ōhana (Windows) / Eriko Kigawa (Drama CD and anime), Chloe Daniels (English, anime)
In the bar vignette, she is a colleague and friend of Kinako. A self-described party wrecker, who eventually stopped getting invited to parties because of it.
Kinako Mochizuki (望月 紀奈子, Mochizuki Kinako)
Voiced by: Haruko Ueda (Windows) / Chiaki Takahashi (Drama CD and anime), Alexis Tipton (English, anime)
In the bar vignette, she is a college student working part-time at Alexander. While she generally has a cheerful disposition, it is hinted she lacks self-confidence when it comes to her entrance exams.
Harue Kasuga (春日 春恵, Kasuga Harue)
Voiced by: Mitsuba (Windows) / Hiromi Ōtsuda (Drama CD and anime), Caitlin Glass (English, anime)
In the street vignette, she is a crepe vendor, who runs a vending cart named "Pal Crepe". She is caring, despite having a personality of a man, and she is endeared as "pal sister" from the old and young.
Kuroudo Hariu (針生 蔵人, Hariu Kurōdo)
Voiced by: Yoshihisa Kawahara (Japanese); Eric Vale (English)
In the street vignette, he is the leader of R-Wing, a goth gang that is rivaled against the Yanagihara Flame Birds. He usually is seen playing a hand drum. In the school vignette, he is a classmate of Takashi and is jealous that Asuka has chosen to be in a relationship with Takashi.
Kazuma Morisato (森里 和馬, Morisato Kazuma)
Voiced by: Hideki Ogihara (Japanese); Austin Tindle (English)
In the street vignette, he is a member of the Yanagihara Flame Birds, a hip gang that is rivaled against R-Wing. In the school vignette, he is a friend of Takashi.
Yū Yoneda (米田 優, Yoneda Yū)
Voiced by: Honoka Imuraya (Windows) / Emiko Hagiwara (Drama CD and anime), Kristi Kang (English, anime)
In the bar vignette, she is Shūsuke's editor. She assigns Shūsuke to do an article review on Hiyoko's two bestselling novels.
Ai Kohda (香田 亜衣, Kōda Ai)
Voiced by: Kasumi Sawamura (Windows) / Saki Nakajima (Drama CD and anime), Brittney Karbowski (English, anime)
In the street vignette, she is a classmate and friend of Naru. However, she tries to claim Hayato as her husband whenever she sees him with Naru.
Karura Itami (伊丹 伽楼羅, Itami Karura)
Voiced by: Tetsu Inada (Japanese); Charles Clegg (English)
In the street vignette, he is introduced as King Garuta Dark-Black of Gredaguard. He temporarily possesses Hayato after the latter failed to protect Naru from Archbishop. He joins the Yanagihara Flame Birds to work alongside Kakeru, but he is unable to adapt to the human world. He later gives up control of the body after seeing Kobato in sadness of losing her brother.
Miyako Yamashina (山科 京, Yamashina Miyako)
Voiced by: Rio Tanaka (Windows) / Yukiko Takaguchi (Drama CD and anime), Michelle Lee (English, anime)
In the school vignette, she is a classmate of Takashi who works at a drug store. She is shown to have two personalities, one of which is quiet and shy and the other of which is extroverted and talkative.

=== Other recurring characters ===
The other recurring characters include minor friends and acquaintances of the series who appear in one of the vignettes.

DJ Condor (DJ コンドル, Dījē Kondoru)
Voiced by: Tomokazu Sugita (Japanese); Brandon Potter (English)
He is an unseen radio host announcer heard from an orange radio, usually making an appearance before the opening credits during an event involving the heroines and after the closing credits during the previews for the subsequent episodes.
Alice (アリス, Arisu)
Voiced by: Sayaka Aoki (Japanese); Lara Woodhull (English)
She is an acquaintance of Hayato and a little girl, who generally has trouble learning street lingo.
Martinez (マルチネス, Maruchinesu)
Voiced by: Takahiro Fujimoto (Japanese); Christopher Sabat (English)
He is an acquaintance of Hayato and an American foreigner, who makes a living selling jewelry.
Sen'ichi "LR2001" Sōda (左右田 "LR2001" 仙一, Sōda "Eruāru Nisen'ichi" Sen'ichi)
Voiced by: Masayuki Sasamoto (Japanese); Chris Rager (English)
He is a member of the Yanagihara Flame Birds. He usually raps whenever he speaks.
Hiroshi "Chikedon" Shimabukuro (島袋 "チケドン" 浩, Shimabukuro "Chikedon" Hiroshi)
Voiced by: Kazunari Tanaka (Japanese); Cris George (English)
He is a member of the Yanagihara Flame Birds. He likes schoolgirl uniforms.
Daisuke "Bunny D" Domon (土門 "バニィ D" 大輔, Domon "Banī Dī" Daisuke)
Voiced by: Chado Horii (Japanese); Justin Cook (English)
He is a member of the Yanagihara Flame Birds. He likes playboy bunny costumes.
Archbishop (大司教, Daishikyō)
Voiced by: Koji Haramaki (Japanese); Chris Guerrero (English)
He is a member of R-Wing. He was kicked out of the gang as a result of shooting Kakeru at the Twilight Rave Party, hosted by R-Wing at the train station. He attempted to kill Hayato, who was responsible for interfering with his chance of killing Kakeru in the first place.
Kyouya (狂夜, Kyōya)
Voiced by: Tomoko Fujino (Japanese); Haley Esposito (English)
She is a member of R-Wing.
Michiya (満夜, Michiya)
Voiced by: Hisayoshi Suganuma (Japanese); Eric Cherry (English)
He is a member of R-Wing.
Sakuya (咲夜, Sakuya)
Voiced by: Junichi Miyake (Japanese); Kyle Phillips (English)
He is a member of R-Wing.
Masako Takauchi (高内 昌子, Takauchi Masako)
Voiced by: Yuka Komatsu (Japanese); Teri Rogers (English)
She is a classmate of Takashi, who is blonde with an aggressive personality. She is assigned with Takashi to work on an essay together, and she tries to interfere with his relationship with Asuka.
Platinum (プラチナ, Purachina)
Voiced by: Makoto Naruse (Japanese); Jerry Jewell (English)
He is a man who has dated 71 girls thus far.
Priest (牧師, Bokushi)
Voiced by: Ryūzaburō Ōtomo (Japanese); R. Bruce Elliott (English)
He is the priest of the church of Gredaguard, who advises Shūsuke and Hayato to chant "that the world may know peace" over and over again whenever they find themselves or others in danger.
Misaki Hayashida (林田 美咲, Hayashida Misaki)
Voiced by: Tae Okajima (Japanese); Morgan Garrett (English)
She is a friend of Kinako.
Akira Yoshikawa (吉川 あきら, Yoshikawa Akira)
Voiced by: Akane Tomonaga (Japanese); Brittany Kramer (English)
She is Kobato's middle school classmate and best friend.

== Music ==
Sky Sanctuary by Miyuki Hashimoto is used for the opening of Oretachi ni Tsubasa wa Nai ~Prelude~ while Jewelry Tears by Aki Misato is used for the opening of the full version. The opening for the fandisc AfterStory is Cross Illusion by Aki Misato. Spread Wings is used for the opening of the English subtitled version.

== Anime ==
In November 2010, an anime television series based on the visual novel was announced. The 12-episode anime series is produced by Nomad under the direction of Shinji Ushiro and Takamitsu Kouno as script supervisor. The anime series uses the same voice cast as the drama CD. Oretachi ni Tsubasa wa Nai began its broadcast run in Japan on April 4, 2011. Funimation Entertainment acquired the series and added it on their video portal on June 24, 2011, followed by a DVD and Blu-ray release in 2013. An unaired OVA came bundled with the remake of the Windows game as a limited edition extra on May 27, 2011. The anime opening theme is "Spread Wings" by Aki Misato, and the ending theme is "NEVERLAND" by Miyuki Hashimoto. "PARANoiA" by Aki Misato was the ending theme for episode 1 and "Hohoemi Genocide" by Alex3 was the ending theme for episode 10.

DJ Condor, the unseen radio host announcer heard from an orange radio, appears in filler scenes before the opening credits, usually involving the heroines.

=== Episode list ===
No.	Title	Original airdate (Note: This program aired on an after-midnight programming schedule, so that the first episode aired on April 3, 2011 at 24:30, which is the same as April 4 at 12:30 a.m. JST.)
1	"For Example, That Kind of Fairytale" "Tatoeba sonna meruhen" (たとえばそんなメルヘン)	April 4, 2011
Takashi Haneda runs late for school, but he is distracted by Asuka Watarai, Naru Ohtori, Hiyoko Tamaizumi and Kobato Haneda along the way. Meanwhile, Shūsuke Chitose agrees with Karuo Karube about having a singles party at the bar, both of them failing to convince Kakeru Ohtori to use his connections to invite any attractive girls. Instead, Shūsuke and Karuo cover up the idea by planning a farewell party for Kinako Mochizuki before she takes her college entrance exams. Once Shūsuke and Karuo also invite Eriko Hino, who is a self-proclaimed party monster, Kakeru decides to attend as well. Elsewhere, Hayato Narita encounters Alice, who has trouble learning street lingo, when he passes by Martinez, who is selling jewelry. Hayato later talks to Harue Kasuga, who offers him to help her clean her crepe vending cart in exchange for a free crepe. After school, Takashi discreetly confesses his love for Asuka before she leaves with her friends. After Takashi is distracted by the heroines, DJ Condor introduces himself as he explains how this story will be a "whale of a tale" and it is going to be a "bumpy ride".
2	"The Animal I Like is the Pegasus" "Suki na dōbutsu wa pegasasu desu" (好きな動物はペガサスです)	April 11, 2011
Harue forces Hayato to help Naru find her bicycle. Naru is the sister of Kakeru, revealed as the crazy leader of the Yanagihara Flame Birds and referred to as "Phoenix". Meanwhile, Yū Yoneda gives Shūsuke an assignment to write an article review on a novel due within a month. With persuasion from Kakeru, Shūsuke talks to Hiyoko, the pseudonymous author of the novel. Shūsuke takes the risk of asking Hiyoko the color of her underwear, yet she calmly comments that her underwear is beige and encourages him to write whatever he can to promote her novel. However, he later finds her undressing in the dressing room of the bar, which creates a rift between them. During the singles/farewell party, Shūsuke tries to make Hiyoko laugh and win her love, but Eriko and Kinako are unimpressed with Shūsuke's attempt at being funny and romantic. Shūsuke runs out the back door, content that he had fun. The heroines draw arrow straws to select who becomes the "king", and Asuka orders Kobato to caress Hiyoko's bosom. DJ Condor claims that he has never been to a singles party, being a "party virgin", but he hopes to be able to get that invite and "pop that party cherry".
3	"Kobato is Cute, Huh?" "Kobato-san wa kawaii nā" (小鳩さんは可愛いなあ)	April 18, 2011
Shūsuke takes up a part-time job at the bar in place of Kinako, who has left to attend college. Hiyoko gives Shūsuke a huge training manual for him to read overnight. Shūsuke encounters Kobato on her way to shop for some soy sauce, and he is later excited when Yū sets an earlier deadline due to being impressed with his article review so far. Meanwhile, Hayato discovers that Naru has an infatuation for worker uniforms. The members of the Yanagihara Flame Birds (Sen'ichi "LR2001" Sōda, Hiroshi "Chikedon" Shimabukuro, Kazuma Morisato and Daisuke "Bunny D" Domon) tell Hayato that the Twilight Rave Party is hosted by their rivals, a goth gang named R-Wing. Before boarding a train, Naru purposely drops her wallet, and she is happy when Hayato finally addresses her by her first name. At the Twilight Rave Party, the members of the Yanagihara Flame Birds attack the members of R-Wing (Archbishop, Kyouya, Michiya and Sakuya) with firecrackers. Kakeru arrives and defeats Archbishop even after being shot in the arm by him. Hayato then breaks up a fight between Kakeru and Kuroudo Hariu, the leader of R-Wing who plays a hand drum. Harue emcees an all-girls' swim meet, where two teams participate in an underwater chicken fight, but it becomes chaotic when all the girls remove each other's bikini tops. DJ Condor says that this swim meet made his "spirits rise", and he encourages people to share their thoughts, since the "phone lines are open".
4	"Drac... I May Have Gotten Pregnant..." "Dora-san... Watashi, ima ninshin shichatta kamo..." (ドラさん…私、今妊娠しちゃったかも…)	April 25, 2011
As Hayato meets up with Naru to find her bicycle, Ai Kohda tries to claim Hayato as her husband. After the members of the Yanagihara Flame Birds tell Hayato that Archbishop has escaped from the hospital, Hayato does research on the official website of R-Wing, learning from the online posts that Archbishop has been kicked out of the gang. Hayato becomes disturbed when Naru and Ai draw too much attention over him. Meanwhile, Hiyoko falls from an office chair and lands on Shūsuke after declining assistance from him to reach a box on top of the dressing room lockers. Kakeru later gets angry when Eriko touches his injured arm, but he leaves after Karuo calms him down. A man wearing a hat and trench coat, who forgets to pay his bill, sees Shūsuke and runs out of the bar in fear. As Shūsuke protects Hiyoko, he is knocked out with a chair thrown by the man. This triggers Shūsuke to awaken Hayato as his alter ego, scaring the man away with his fists. It is shown that Takashi, Shūsuke and Hayato each share the same vessel, respectively nicknamed the "Daytime Hawk", the "Evening Eagle" and the "Late Night Falcon". The heroines fight as teachers using giant school supplies, and Asuka is the victor. DJ Condor comments about making friends with "hot ladies" on the internet, but this cannot beat coming face-to-face with their "godly gifts".
5	"O, How Virtuous is Our Honored Hawk!" "Nantaru Hōku-kyō no toku takaki koto yo!" (なんたるホーク卿の徳高きことよ!)	May 2, 2011
Takashi and Asuka pretend to be a couple on mutual terms to prevent Takashi from being picked on by his classmates. Takashi's classmate Masako Takauchi, who is assigned with him to write a graduation essay together, leaves him with all the work since he is dating Asuka. Takashi briefly escapes to his imaginary world of Gredaguard, where he serves as a knight named Lord Hawk Cyan-Blue under the rule of Princess Asuka. Afterwards, Takashi runs into Kuroudo, who feels apathetic that Asuka has chosen to be with Takashi. When being summoned back to Gredaguard, Takashi leads his comrades into battle against the enemies in order to protect the kingdom. At night, Asuka calls Takashi, pondering if he has found another girl. The next day, Takashi returns to Gredaguard, where a handmaiden, who resembles Masako, tries to seduce him but ends up rejecting him. After school, Asuka invites Takashi to go shopping with her, but she mentions that she has waited two years for him to ask her out. Meanwhile, Hayato witnesses Martinez being carried into an ambulance, while Alice runs to Hayato and embraces him in tears.
6	"Eek! No, I'll Make Noise!" "Hī! Ramē, koe deshau~!" (ひいッ!らめえ、声出しゃう～!)	May 9, 2011
Hayato learns that Alice saw Martinez being shot by a man wearing a hat and trench coat, but Harue is relieved that the bullet did not hit any of Martinez's vital organs. It is revealed that the man wearing a hat and trench coat is actually Archbishop. Meanwhile, Shūsuke throws away Karuo's perverted collectibles, otherwise known as "smut". Shūsuke later becomes aroused when Hiyoko rubs disinfectant cream across his head wound. Hayato instructs Naru to go back home, worrying about her safety. He then warns Kakeru about Archbishop, but Kakeru mentions that his sister Naru means nothing to him anymore, much to Hayato's surprise. Yū discusses with Shūsuke about the contrast in moods and emotions in Hiyoko's two bestselling novels, "Smiling Inside" and "88th Birthday". Hayato is approached by Naru wearing a cat costume, but Archbishop suddenly appears and shoots off Naru's cat ear, causing Hayato to punch Archbishop in rage. Hayato faints after the members of the Yanagihara Flame Birds capture Archbishop and retrieve Naru. Kakeru is shocked when Hayato reawakens as King Garuta Dark-Black of Gredaguard.
7	"Your King's Glorious Return!" "Hae Aru Ō no Gaisen da!" (栄えある王の凱旋(がいせん)だ!)	May 16, 2011
It is shown that Garuta, whose real name is Karura Itami, possessed Hayato from within Gredaguard. Kakeru introduces Karura to the members of the Yanagihara Flame Birds to have a picnic at a mall. However, Karura is not used to the human world, shown when he believes that a snowman prop was a real creature and when he studies from a sex education textbook. Karura throws a cake out of anger at Platinum, a man who introduces his 71st girlfriend, which starts a cake throwing war in the mall. During this time, Karura recognizes Kobato as Princess Dove of Gredaguard as she passes by. He arrives home to Kobato, and he tries to express his feelings of love to her in an inappropriate way. He tells her that he will not allow Takashi, Shūsuke or Hayato to take possession of the vessel, which upsets her. When Kobato goes to check on her bathtub, Karura decides to return to Gredaguard in order to atone for Kobato's sadness. As Karura explains his backstory in Gredaguard, he is interrupted when the heroines have a Christmas photo shoot. However, Miyako Yamashina believes that the heroines should expose more of themselves for fanservice purposes.
8	"No Big-Busted Cream Girl Yet?!" "Kyonyū no Kurīmu Onēchan Mada desu kā!" (巨乳のクリームお姉ちゃんまだですかー!)	May 23, 2011
In the church of Gredaguard, Shūsuke and Hayato recall when the Priest told them to recite "that the world may know peace" whenever they find themselves and others in danger. Later, a mishap involving cream-filled pie puts Shūsuke in an embarrassing position, but Hiyoko is impressed that Shūsuke has memorized the training manual. Meanwhile, Hayato hangs out with Naru and Harue at the crepe vending cart, where he gives Alice a ring purchased from a street vendor after Martinez does not accept the offer. Elsewhere, Takashi passes by a shy Miyako Yamashina at a drug store, as well as a jealous Kuroudo at the train station. Takashi finds himself in Gredaguard, where he fights off monsters deep in a forest. When he becomes injured, Miyako forcefully uses her nude body to heal him. Back in the real world, Asuka encourages Takashi to make plans to play video games with her after school. However, Masako tries to ruin his plans by using the graduation essay assignment as an excuse. Asuka witnesses Takashi as he escapes to Gredaguard. When Shūsuke takes over the vessel, Asuka realizes that Takashi has multiple personalities. In Naraku, as Yōji Haneda scrolls through the television channels featuring the heroines, DJ Condor says that the story is finally "going underway". After Karura crashes onto DJ Condor from above, Karura advises Yōji to return to Gredaguard at once, since Kobato requests his presence. However, Yōji says that he never wants to leave Naraku.
9	"My Heart is Heaving!!" "Mune ga Takanarū!!" (胸が高鳴るーっ!!)	May 30, 2011
Asuka promises to not tell Takashi that Shūsuke is a part of him. In the church of Gredaguard, Hayato is concerned why Shūsuke revealed the truth. In the real world, Shūsuke tries to maintain his cool as Takashi while in class, but he is approached by a talkative Miyako, who reveals that she is fully compatible with him. After school, Shūsuke tells Asuka that he is unable to bring back Takashi for now. Meanwhile, Karuo wants to promote the bar by having Eriko and Kinako dress up as pop stars. Later, Hiyoko tries to hide her feelings when she overhears Eriko and Kinako critiquing Shūsuke's article review on "88th Birthday", much different from "Smiling Inside". Elsewhere, Hayato, Naru, Ai and Kazuma run into the members of R-Wing, who thank Hayato for beating up Archbishop. Naru wants to find her bicycle because it contains a pager in the front basket. Alice and Harue tell Hayato and Naru that the bicycle was taken to a repository outside the city ward's office. Once there, Naru hides a message received on the pager and starts to ride her bicycle, while Hayato becomes curious and begins to chase her on foot.
10	"Please, Always Be a Fan, Okay?" "Zutto, Fan de Ite Kudasai ne" (ずっと、ファンでいてくださいね)	June 6, 2011
Hayato takes over the vessel and goes to school as Takashi. When Masako puts Hayato in charge of assigning the graduation essays to the class, his mean personality is reflected. Kuroudo is aware of the truth behind Takashi's vessel being shared with Shūsuke and Hayato, while Miyako thanks Takashi for talking to her upon their first encounter, unaware that she is currently speaking to Hayato. Meanwhile, Hayato hangs out with Naru, Alice, Ai and Harue at the swimming pool. Later, when Naru and Ai take Hayato to the bar, Hayato has Shūsuke take over the vessel. Shūsuke tries to avoid making a scene, but Karuo and Eriko purposely call for Hiyoko, since Shūsuke has been seen with two girls. After Shūsuke and Hiyoko overhear Naru and Ai talk about "Smiling Inside" and "88th Birthday", Shūsuke introduces Naru and Ai to Hiyoko. After Naru and Ai leave, Shūsuke encourages Hiyoko to write another novel for her fans, despite her fear of criticism. After submitting a successful manuscript for her third novel, Hiyoko confronts and reconciles with Eriko and Kinako.
11	"Are You Familiar with the Concept of Little Sister Moe?" "Imōto Moe to Iu Gainen o Shitte Iruka?" (妹萌えという概念を知っているか?)	June 13, 2011
After walking with Asuka to school, Takashi discusses with Kuroudo and Miyako about the concept of little sister moe, which is an infatuation for any girls that resembles one's sister. While walking with Asuka, Takashi briefly runs into Yū, who believes that he is Shūsuke. Takashi then encounters Alice and Harue, who both think that he is Hayato. Asuka brings Takashi to her house, where he explains that he prefers to reside in Gredaguard rather than in the real world. Asuka reveals that she had an imaginary brother named Asumu during her lonely childhood. She then shows Takashi a video game called Wingquest, set in the world of Gredaguard. However, Takashi is overwhelmed as he denies that Gredaguard is an imaginary world. Shūsuke and Hayato alternate as they take over the vessel, in which Asuka punches them both and demands for Takashi to return. After a while, Asuka spreads her wings and finally reaches out to Takashi, convincing him to face reality. Takashi goes back home to Kobato, who is worried because of his injuries. The next day, Takashi and Kobato argue outside the house as Kakeru urges them to get in the car.
12	"We With(out) Wings..." "Oretachi ni tsubasa wa......" (俺たちに翼は……)	June 20, 2011
It is explained that Kobato's older brother Yōji Haneda was condemned to Naraku, a secluded place in Gredaguard. When his father abused his mother during his childhood, Yōji created three personalities named Takashi, Shūsuke and Hayato in order to protect Kobato. Kakeru takes Takashi and Kobato to a church, where Kobato reminds Takashi of the phrase "that the world may know peace", showing a note that says that their mother poisoned herself to death. Kobato spreads her wings, giving Yōji the resolve to let go of the past. The next day, Kobato introduces Yōji to Akira Yoshikawa, Kobato's best friend. Yōji notifies all of his friends and acquaintances about his multiple personalities, visiting the bar first and then the street. On the way to school by train, he bumps into a timid Misaki Hayashida, who encourages him to tell that special someone the secret that he has been holding back. After encountering the rest of his friends and acquaintances at school, he finally reveals the truth to Asuka, who proceeds to knock him out, resulting in television static. On the way to school the next day, Yōji is distracted by the heroines once again.
13	"More Than 90% Flesh-Toned" "Hadairo-ritsu Kyū Wari Zō" (肌色率九割増)	(DVD and Blu-ray Special)
When Yū enters the bar, she sees Misaki taking up a job as a clumsy waitress. After Karuo tells Yū that he is holding a contest for the best woman who can pose like the letter M, he receives a text message from Kinako, who sends him a picture of a monkey. While on vacation at a hot springs resort, Hiyoko, Eriko and Kinako spend time in the bathhouse; Asuka, Masako and Miyako play ping-pong in the game room; Kobato, Alice and Akira sit on the massage chairs in the lobby; and Naru, Harue and Ai hang out in their bedroom. Each group discusses a rumor about a ghost who haunts the hot springs resort at night. After it is said that the ghost is afraid of soap and shampoo, this leads to a quarrel, to the point of squirting soap and shampoo on each other. It is revealed that Kakeru started the rumor, stipulating that the ghost must be seen in order to improve one's love life. The four heroines leave their bedrooms and head to the bathhouse in order to confirm the rumor. It is hinted that Yōji is waiting for them at the bathhouse. At the beginning of the episode, DJ Condor says that everything in this episode is "half off" and "ninety percent flesh-toned", which may not make sense until you watch it. A teaser scene shows Takashi, Shūsuke and Hayato together in a hot spring, before DJ Condor abruptly cuts it short. At the end of the episode, DJ Condor hopes "your heart grew three sizes" in this "warm, fuzzy fairy tale".

== Reception ==
The PlayStation 3 and PlayStation Vita ports both received review scores of 29/40 by Famitsu.
