= Hiro Suzuhira =

Japanese manga artist

- 鈴平 ひろ
- Born: January 17, 1978 (age 48)
- Occupations: manga artist, character designer, and illustrator

Hiro Suzuhira (鈴平ひろ, Suzuhira Hiro; born January 17, 1978) is a female Japanese manga artist, character designer, and illustrator. She currently resides in Tokyo, Japan.

Hiro Suzuhira and Aoi Nishimata have known each other from high school; their first work, Ritual, was introduced in 1996. In 2000, she joined BasiL and became the illustrator for Bless: Close Your Eyes, Open Your Mind. After Bless was released, she quit from BasiL and became a freelance illustrator. During this period in 2001, she illustrated one of the characters for Welcome to Pia Carrot 3. In 2003, she joined Navel along with Aoi Nishimata, illustrating Shuffle! before moving on to Soul Link and Tick! Tack!.

On February 23, 2007, she quit Navel due to health issues and again became a free illustrator.

== Works ==
=== Character Design ===
==== Visual Novels ====
Romaji Title	Original Title	Producer	Release Year
Bless ~Close your eyes, open your mind.~	-	BasiL	2000
Pia ♥ Carrot e Yōkoso!! 3	Pia♥キャロットへようこそ!! 3	F&C FC02	2001
Aikagi ~Hidamari to Kanojo no Heyagi~	あいかぎ～ひだまりと彼女の部屋着～	F&C FC02	2002
Shuffle!	-	Navel	2004
Monochrome	-	KID	2004
Soul Link	-	Navel	2004
Tick! Tack!	-	Navel	2005
Really? Really!	-	Navel	2006
Ne~ pon? Raipon!	ね～PON？×らいPON！	Navel	2007
Yosuga no Sora	ヨスガノソラ	Sphere	2008
Stellar ☆ Theater	-	Rosebleu	2009
Haruka na Sora	ハルカナソラ	Sphere	2009
Marriage Royale ~Prism Story~	マリッジロワイヤル ～プリズムストーリー～	Vridge Inc.	2010
Sakura Bitmap	さくらビットマップ	Hooksoft	2010
Stellar ☆ Theater Encore	-	Rosebleu	2011
Tsuki ni Yorisō Otome no Sahō	月に寄りそう乙女の作法	Navel	2012
Berry's	-	Sphere	2013
Otome Riron to Sono Shūhen	乙女理論とその周辺 －Ecole de Paris－	Navel	2013
Tsuki ni Yorisō Otome no Sahō 2	月に寄りそう乙女の作法2	Navel	2014
Traveling Stars	トラベリングスターズ	Hooksoft	2015
Otome Riron to Sono go no Shūhen -Belle Époque	乙女理論とその後の周辺 -Belle Époque-	Navel	2016

==== Other Games ====
- Melody of Emotion
- Phantom Breaker

=== Published books ===
- Gishiki ~Ritual~ (儀式〜RITUAL〜) (1996)
- Chronicle (2008)
- Suzuhira Hiro R.G.B! Illustrations (鈴平ひろR・G・B!イラストレーションズ) (2013)

=== Light Novel Illustration ===
- Ginban Kaleidoscope
- Akikan!

=== Others ===
- 11eyes: Tsumi to Batsu to Aganai no Shōjo (Waitress costume design)
