= Miyuki Hashimoto =

Japanese singer (born 1980)

Miyuki Hashimoto (橋本 みゆき, Hashimoto Miyuki; born May 14, 1980) is a female Japanese singer from Saitama Prefecture. She is signed to Lantis, a label which contribute songs to anime and video games.

== Discography ==
=== Singles ===
- Koko ni Iru kara... (Released August 25, 2004)
1. Koko ni Iru kara... — anime television series Girls Bravo first season ending theme
2. FOREVER
- and then, (Released March 2, 2005)
1. and then, — anime television series Girls Bravo second season ending theme
2. Nakigao Nochi Hare
- innocence (Released August 24, 2005)
1. innocence — anime television series Shuffle! ending theme
2. Time has come
- Be Ambitious, Guys! (Released September 7, 2005)
1. Be Ambitious, Guys! — PC game Tick! Tack! opening theme
2. Pieces — PC game Tick! Tack! insert song
- Faze to love (Released November 2, 2005)
1. Faze to love — anime television series Gunparade Orchestra opening theme
2. Arigato!
- screaming (Released April 26, 2006)
1. screaming — anime television series Soul Link opening theme
2. dust trail — anime television series Soul Link ending theme
- Cosmic Rhapsody (Released July 5, 2006)
1. Cosmic Rhapsody — PS2 game Soul Link Extension opening theme
2. Anata o Mamoritai — PS2 game Soul Link Extension opening theme
- Nijiiro Sentimental (Released October 25, 2006)
1. Nijiiro Sentimental — anime television series Gift ~eternal rainbow~ opening theme
2. Amayaka na Atashi
- Bimetsu S.O.S!! (Released April 25, 2007)
1. Binetsu S.O.S!! — anime television series Idolmaster: Xenoglossia opening theme
2. Moonlight Labyrinth — anime television series Idolmaster: Xenoglossia insert song
- Star☆drops (Released September 5, 2007)
1. Star☆drops — PC game Hoshiful ~Seitou Gakuen Tenmon Doukoukai~ opening theme
2. Hoshi ni Negai o ~When you wish upon Star☆drops~ — PC game Hoshiful ~Seitou Gakuen Tenmon Doukoukai~ image song
- Hizamazuku made 5-byou Dake! (Released January 23, 2008)
1. Hizamazuku made 5-byou Dake! — anime television series Kimi ga Aruji de Shitsuji ga Ore de opening theme
2. Sha-la-la
- Sky Sanctuary (Released July 23, 2008)
1. Sky Sanctuary — Visual novel Oretachi ni Tsubasa wa Nai ~Prelude~ opening theme
2. change of heart
- Hatsukoi Parachute (Released October 22, 2008)
1. Hatsukoi Parachute — anime television series Akaneiro ni Somaru Saka opening theme
2. sweet sweet time
- Glossy:MMM (Released April 22, 2009)
1. Glossy:MMM — anime television series Saki opening theme
2. The room vacation
- Princess Primp! (Released July 22, 2009)
1. Princess Primp! — anime television series Princess Lover! opening theme
2. Inochi Mijikashi, Koiseyo Hime!
- Nudity (Released March 24, 2010)
- Prism Celebration (Released April 7, 2010)
- Tropical Future (Released August 11, 2010)
- Future ∞ (Released October 27, 2010)
- Neverland (Released May 11, 2011)
1. Neverland - anime television series Oretachi ni Tsubasa wa Nai ending theme

=== Albums ===
- Lovey-dovey (Released June 28, 2006)
1. Faze to love
2. Koko ni Iru kara...
3. LINK — PC game Shiritsu Akihabara Gakuen ending theme
4. Love, Fate, Love — anime television series Final Approach ending theme
5. Cheer Up! — PC game Home maid opening theme
6. and then,
7. innocence - anime television series Shuffle! ending theme
8. Akiiro — PC game Akiiro Renka opening theme
9. AM1:00 — PC game White Princess ending theme
10. Be Ambitious, Guys!
11. Anata e
- Prismatic colors (Released June 27, 2007)
1. Nijiiro Sentimental
2. Screaming - anime television series Soul Link opening theme
3. Especially — PC game D.C. II ~Da Capo II~ insert song
4. Peppermint — OVA Ichigo 100% ending theme
5. Astraea — PC game Muv-Luv (all-age version) Kei Ayamine ending theme
6. little wish — anime television series Shuffle! Memories image song
7. Taiyou ni Te o Nobase — PS2 game Gunparade Orchestra Midori no Shou ~Ookami to Ka no Shōnen~ opening theme
8. Prismatic colors
9. Growth — PC game Akiiro Ouka opening theme
10. Ageless Love — PC game Really? Really! insert song
11. Binetsu S.O.S!! ~solitude Ver.
12. Aozora no Mieru Oka de — PC game Aozora no Mieru Oka opening theme
13. Eien ni Saku Hana — PC game Miharu ~Alto Another Story~ ending theme
- Secret masterpieces (Released December 19, 2007, distributed through iTunes Store Japan)
1. Confession — PC game Majipuri -Wonder Cradle- opening theme
2. Hikarikaze — PS2 game Final Approach ending theme
3. L — PC game Alto opening theme
4. Anata o Mamoritai
5. dust trail - anime television series Soul Link ending theme
6. Love Song — PC game Primitive Link ending theme
7. Sakamichi — PC game Aozora no Mieru Oka ending theme
8. FOREVER
9. Tsuioku, Soshite Yokan — PC game Homemaid insert song
10. My Story — PS2&DC game Suigetsu ~Mayoigokoro~ ending theme
11. Nijiiro Sentimental (bossanova version)
- Brilliant Moment (Released August 6, 2008)
1. TIME — PC game Ashita no Kimi to Au tame ni opening theme
2. Hizamazuku made 5-byou dake!
3. Princess Lover! — PC game Princess Lover! opening theme
4. to the sky — PC game MagusTale ~Sekaijuu to Koisuru Mahou Tsukai~ opening theme
5. Himitsu Recipe — PC game Sakura Strasse opening theme
6. Ai no Kakera — anime television series School Days ending theme
7. Setsunasa no Gradation — PC game Akaneiro ni Somaru Saka opening theme
8. True fairy tale from happy princess — PC game Happy Princess opening theme
9. FairlyLife — PC game FairlyLife theme song
10. Akane no Saka — PS2 game Akaneiro ni Somaru Saka: Parallel opening theme
11. natural tone — anime television series Shuffle! Memories episode12 ending theme
12. Star☆drops
13. Binetsu S.O.S!!
14. Brilliant Moment
15. two of us — PC game Happy Princess ending theme
- Double Flower (Released September 25, 2009)
1. Hatsukoi Parachute
2. to be continued — PC game Happy Princess ~Another Fairytale~ theme song
3. ever — PC game Ashita no Shitsumi to Au tame ni opening theme
4. Glossy:MMM — anime television series Saki opening theme
5. Here To Stay — PS2 game Akaneiro ni Somaru Saka: Parallel ending theme
6. Pieces
7. Sky Sanctuary
8. Fortune's wheel — PC game Homemaid ~Sweets~ ending theme
9. glorious days — PC game Sakuranbo Strasse opening theme
10. Koizakura — PC game Haruiro Ouse opening theme
11. Todoke, Kono Omoi — PC game Princess Lover! ending theme
12. Voice
13. Princess Primp!
- espressivo (Released November 24, 2010)
1. Symphonic Love - PC game Mashiro-iro Symphony theme song
2. Ishin Denshin ~Itsuka Kitto, Dakara Kitto~ - PC game Natsuiro Penguin opening theme
3. se.Kirara - PC game Se-kirara opening theme
4. Prism Celebration - PSP game Marriage Royale: Prism Story opening theme
5. Eternal Recurrence - PC game Hoshizora no Memoria opening theme
6. White Crystal - PC game Memoria theme song
7. Waltz! Waltz! Waltz! (Clear Sound Ver.) - PS2 game Princess Lover! Eternal Love For My Lady first print limited edition special insert song
8. Mirai Kaikisen - anime television series Shukufuku no Campanella ending theme
9. Shiawase Houteishiki - PC game Neko☆Koi! ~Nekogami-sama to Nekomimi no Tatari~ ending theme
10. Natsu Kashiki Kioku - PC game Natsu ni Kanaderu Bokura no Uta theme song
11. Espressivo
12. Silhouette - PC game Oretachi ni Tsubasa ha nai drama CD 2nd season vol.4 image song
13. Koi no Roller Coaster - PC game Da Capo II Fall in Love opening theme
