= Akikan! =

Japanese light novel series

- Akikan! light novel volume 1 cover featuring Melon.

アキカン!
- Genre: Romantic comedy
- Light novel
- Written by: Riku Ranjō
- Illustrated by: Hiro Suzuhira
- Published by: Shueisha
- Imprint: Super Dash Bunko
- Original run: May 24, 2007 – March 22, 2013
- Volumes: 10
- Manga
- Illustrated by: Momotaro Miyano
- Published by: Shueisha
- Magazine: Ultra Jump
- Original run: October 18, 2008 – April 18, 2009
- Volumes: 1
- Anime television series
- Directed by: Yūji Himaki
- Produced by: Makoto Ōyoshi; Masashi Takatori; Shinya Shinozaki
- Written by: Hideaki Koyasu
- Music by: Akito Matsuda (Note: Credited under the pseudonym Nijine.)
- Studio: Brain's Base
- Licensed by: NA: Sentai Filmworks
- Original network: Kids Station, BS11
- Original run: January 4, 2009 – March 29, 2009
- Episodes: 12 + OVA

Akikan! (Japanese: アキカン!; lit. "Empty Can!") is a Japanese light novel series about a group of anthropomorphic soda cans who do battle. It was created by Riku Ranjō, with illustrations by Hiro Suzuhira, known for her artistry in Shuffle!. The first novel was released on May 24, 2007, and as of March 22, 2013, ten volumes have been published by Shueisha under their Super Dash Bunko label. A manga adaptation began serialization in Ultra Jump on October 18, 2008, an anime adaptation began airing on January 4, 2009. On December 22, 2008, an early release of the first episode was streamed on the internet through Bandai Channel. On the day the final episode aired on March 28, 2009, an Akikan! OVA followed on October 23, 2009. At Anime Weekend Atlanta 2011, Sentai Filmworks announced that they had licensed both the TV series and OVA which released in 2012.

== Story ==
Akikan ("Empty Can") is the unlikely story of high school boy Kakeru Daichi, whose can of melon soda magically transforms into a human girl. More "akikan" girls begin appearing, each of them needing to be infused with carbon dioxide from their respective drink types to survive. The akikans were created as part of the 'Akikan Elect' to determine whether steel cans or aluminium cans are superior. The akikans must battle each other until only the strongest type is left standing.

== Characters ==
=== Owners ===
Kakeru Daichi (大地 カケル, Daichi Kakeru)
Voiced by: Jun Fukuyama
Kakeru is a sixteen-year-old studying at Kyuugetsu Academy and loves to crack lewd jokes. He loves juice and has made a hobby of collecting juice cans. One day, he bought a melon soda that transformed into a girl, which was an Akikan. He was later invited by Hidehiko Otoya to join the "Akikan Elect" and "Intelligence Port Project" but being a person who hated fights, he rejected the invitation (although he was later forced to participate). Later, he made up his mind to crush the projects together with his comrades. A certain incident during his sophomore/junior high school days made him afraid of hurting somebody. Later on, he also became the owner of another Akikan, Shiruko.
Najimi Tenkuji (天空寺 なじみ, Tenkūji Najimi)
Voiced by: Aki Toyosaki
Najimi is Kakeru's childhood-friend and classmate, whose charm point is her "antenna" hair which changes form according to her mood. She's an heiress to the Tenkuuji group of companies and she holds a romantic feeling toward Kakeru. She's gentle and easy-going, but her weird sense of imagination tends to warp her into her own world. She became Yell's owner as she bought a sports drink on the night of Yurika Kochikaze's birthday party. She has a history of being saved by Kakeru from being kidnapped. She also gets drunk from carbonated drinks and will attempt to strip when under the influence.
Misaki Miyashita (宮下 美咲, Miyashita Misaki)
Voiced by: Ryou Hirohashi
Misaki is a junior high sophomore student who owns Budoko. She was a timid girl who hid inside her shell and didn't have friends. She was afraid of making friends, thinking that someday she and her friends might hate each other, just like her parents. Her hobby is drawing, and she often refers people to Otaku terminologies.

=== Akikans ===
Melon (メロン, Meron)
Voiced by: Sayaka Narita
A steel Akikan who came from a melon soda, owned by Kakeru. She's competitive and strong-willed, which was the reason why she was always having a fight with Kakeru. Although she likes her owner, she cannot express her feelings well and ends up telling the opposite of what she wants to say. She likes watching baseball matches, even on midnight telecasts, though she has stated she has no clue about how the game is played. She basically hates Aluminum Akikans and is always having small quarrels with Yell. She mostly uses carbon dioxide-based cool drink sorcery in battle.
Yell (エール, Ēru)
Voiced by: Mamiko Noto
An Aluminum Akikan who came from a sports drink, owned by Najimi. She's usually cool and composed but she becomes furious when someone tries to insult her owner, going as far as to attempt to kill Kakeru when he (unknowingly) upsets Najimi. She's got sharp vision which was the cause for her being sensitive to moving objects, causing her the urge to play with them. In this aspect and several others, she is very cat-like. Her tail-like hair that twitches when she sees moving objects accentuates this fact. She also loves animals and she has a pet turtle called "Kame". She uses the "isotonic sword" as her cool drink sorcery, which can cut through anything made of organic matter.
Budoko (ぶど子)
Voiced by: Aoi Yūki
An Aluminum Akikan who came from grape juice. She's small but strong-willed and talks in a funny way. She was killed once by Melon as a result of the "Akikan Elect" battle but was revived later as RG:A (this does not happen in the anime as Kakeru made Melon miss). She loves to watch the stars together with her owner, Misaki Miyashita.
Shiruko (しるこ)
A steel Akikan who came from a sweet red bean soup. She has the appearance of a 5th-grade school student. She is very shy and easily scared by loud noises, but she is a kind-hearted girl who worries for everyone. Unlike Melon and Yell, she dislikes being cold and prefers warm temperatures. She loves taking hot baths and she likes to eat red bean rice cakes. She wears mouse-style pajamas when she sleeps. She does not make an appearance in the anime.
Mai (舞)
An Aluminum Akikan who came from a can of vegetable juice owned by Toudou. At first, she seemed to be a selfish Akikan who did not care for her owner but later it was discovered that she was a caring Akikan who always thinks about what is best for her owner. She talks tomboyishly. Her cool drink spells are the vegetable-summoning "Gevetarians" and the knuckle bombing "Mixed Vegetable".
Miku (未来, Miku)
Voiced by: Megumi Nakajima
A mixed juice Steel Akikan who appears in the anime. Her can was girlished by a cat (the same cat that is usually found on the roof of Daichi and Melon's house) who ran off right away. This caused her to have a hatred of Akikans, both Aluminum and Steel, with owners, and she began absorbing their powers and calling herself 'The Strongest Akikan'. Her main cool drink sorcery is Rainbow Splash Mixer, and she also has the ability to make clones of the Akikans she had captured called Zeros. Since she was never given a name, Kakeru gives her the name 'Miku', a name she likes but doesn't admit to it. Daichi offered the idea to be her Owner, something she considered until Otoya showed her a picture of her true Owner and ran off to find it. At the end of the series, she is friends with the main cast and still chasing her Owner.

=== Others ===
Yurika Kochikaze (東風 揺花, Kochikaze Yurika)
Voiced by: Aiko Ōkubo
Kakeru and Najimi's classmate who claims to be Najimi's lover. She's always having fights with Kakeru and Yell as her rival for Najimi. She's also a self-proclaimed witch and she often uses cards to throw at Kakeru (which, from the back, look like tarot cards but are normal poker cards). In some instances, she shows mysterious powers. Her birthday is on Halloween, which could be the reason she believes she is a witch. Her nickname is Yuriri.
Goro Amaji (甘字 五郎, Amaji Gorō)
Voiced by: Nobuhiko Okamoto
Kakeru's classmate and friend. He was nicknamed Gigolo by Kakeru, but he is far from being a ladies' man. He is often forgotten by his friends due to his lack of Existence. He also has a crush on Yurika Kochikaze but always ends up not being able to tell her or being ignored. But, he is a reliable person at times of need, always ready to help his friend. He lives together with his three sisters, all sharing the same bunk bed.
Hidehiko Otoya (男屋 秀彦, Otoya Hidehiko)
Voiced by: Ryōtarō Okiayu
A government official designated to Department of Economy. He is the founder of the "Akikan Elect" and "Intelligence Port project", though it's unclear why. Otoya is gay and quite lascivious; he is particularly attracted to so-called "pretty boys", and he'll even resort to pretending to be the school doctor in order to be close to them. He especially makes continual sexual advances toward Kakeru, which are always rejected in the anime. In the OVA, however, he raped Kakeru twice.
Airin Kizaki (木崎 愛鈴, Kizaki Airin)
Voiced by: Megumi Toyoguchi
Otoya's secretary. Her strictness belies her timid nature, and she hates it when Otoya calls her by her given name. She later becomes the homeroom teacher to keep an eye on the Owners and Akikans. She's also one of the few characters with no outlandish mannerisms or traits.

== Media ==
=== Light novels ===
The original light novels written by Riku Ranjō and illustrated by Hiro Suzuhira began release on Shueisha's Super Dash Bunko label from May 24, 2007, with ten volumes released as of March 22, 2013

=== Manga ===
A manga adaptation illustrated by Momotaro Miyano began serialization in Shueisha's Ultra Jump magazine from October 18, 2008, to April 18, 2009.

=== Anime ===
An anime television series adaptation by Brain's Base aired in Japan between January 4, 2009, and March 29, 2009. A special episode (episode 6.5) aired on February 15, 2009, instead of the usual one: this was a half-hour three-part live-action show with Akikan voice actors and musicians. An original video animation episode was released on October 23, 2009. The series and OVA have been licensed in North America by Sentai Filmworks for release in 2012.

The series uses three pieces of theme music: two openings, and one ending theme. The opening themes are "The Miracle Plan is Complete!" (ミラクル・プランができちゃった!, Mirakuru Puran ga Dekichatta!) by Charmy Queen for episodes 1–6 and "Juicy Extacy" by Little Non for episodes 7–12. The ending theme is "Love Air Recycling" (恋空リサイクリング, Koisora Risaikuringu) by Nomiko (singer) and TECHNOBOYS PULCRAFT GREEN-FUND (music), which has different variations (14 overall) in each episode (including special and OVA) with guest artists sometimes.

1. Featuring Melon Soda (メロンソーダ)
2. Featuring Tsubuiri Grape Juice (粒入りグレープジュース)
3. Featuring Ginger Ale [Dry] (ジンジャーエール[ドライ])
4. Featuring Oolong Tea [High Grade] (Oolong Cha [Tokkyū], 烏龍茶[特級])
5. Featuring Japanese Tea [Green Tea] (Nippon Cha [Ryokucha], 日本茶[煎茶])
6. Featuring Cola (コーラ), with k. moriya

Special - Featuring Energy Drink (エナジードリンク), with Little Non

7. Featuring Canned Oden (Oden Kan, おでん缶)
8. Featuring Peach Nectar (ピーチネクター), with Charmy Queen
9. Featuring Afternoon Black Tea (Afternoon Kōcha, Afternoon 紅茶)
10. Featuring Black, Sugarless Coffee (Coffee [Black, Mutō], コーヒー[ブラック、無糖])
11. Featuring Sweet Red Bean Soup (Oshiruko, お汁粉)
12. Featuring Mikkuchu Jūchu (みっくちゅじゅーちゅ), with Miku Hatsune

OVA - Featuring Recycling! (リサイクリング!), partially remix of "Get Wild" by TM Network, the ending theme from City Hunter anime series

The first and second openings were released on single discs. The ending theme (versions from the anime series and special episode) was released on single disc too. The OVA version of the ending theme was released as part of the OST disc.
