= Navel (company) =

Japanese video game company

- Type: Visual novel studio
- Industry: Computer games
- Founded: 2003
- Headquarters: Japan
- Products: Adult visual novels
- Website: project-navel.com

Navel (ネーブル, Nēburu) is a Japanese label of Omega Vision Inc. a publisher of bishōjo and eroge visual novel games. Its name is a reference to the navel orange.

== History ==
Navel was formed by former staff of BasiL such as Aoi Nishimata, Ō Jackson, and Acchorike and made a hit with 2002 visual novel "Sore wa Maichiru Sakura no Youni" before they left in 2003 and formed Navel under company Omegavision, inc. which later Hiro Suzuhira joined. An official website was established as they promoted their first game "Shuffle!".

On January 30, 2006, their first game was released apparently made a big hit and ranked 3 at Getchu.com's sales ranking, which was the born of the spin-offs.

As of February 23, 2007, Hiro Suzuhira left Navel due to her poor health, with "Ne~ pon? Raipon!" as her last game with the company, and becomes a freelancer.

On March 25, 2009, Navel established their sister brand Lime which was announced in magazine PUSH!! issue May 2006, with their first game "Nostradamus ni Kiite Miro".

On April 21, 2012, Navel's sister brand Lime established their child brand Lime Vert with concept "pure love that weighted on adult scenes". Their first game was ××× na Kanojo ga Inaka Seikatsu wo Mankitsu Suru Himitsu no Hōhō.

On October 26, 2012 Navel announced their 10th anniversary game "Tsuki ni Yorisō Otome no Sahō" with Hiro Suzuhira back as one of character designer. The game is planned to be a trilogy.

On November 30, 2013, they celebrated the 10th anniversary of their first game, "Shuffle!" along with establishments of their new child brand Navel HoneyBell and its first game "Sora Tobu Hitsuji to Manatsu no Hana".

== Works ==
=== Visual novels ===
==== By Navel ====
- Shuffle! (2004)
- Soul Link (2004)
- Tick! Tack! (2005)
- Really? Really! (2006)
- Oretachi ni Tsubasa wa Nai ~Prelude~ (2008)
- Oretachi ni Tsubasa wa Nai (2009)
- Shuffle! Essence+ (2009)
- Soul Link Ultimate (2010)
- Oretachi ni Tsubasa wa Nai ~After Story~ (2010)
- Sekai Seifuku Kanojo (2010)
- Shuffle! Love Rainbow (2011)
- World Wide Love! Sekai Seifuku Kanojo Fan Disc (2011)
- Tsuki ni Yorisō Otome no Sahō (2012)
- Otome Riron to Sono Shuuhen -Ecole de Paris- (2013)
- Tsuki ni Yorisō Otome no Sahō 2 (2014)
- Otome Riron to Sono go no Shuuhen -Belle Époque- (2016)
- Kimi to Mezameru Ikutsuka no Houhou (2018)
- Spiral!! (2019)
- Princess x Princess (2021)

==== Collaboration between Navel and Lime ====
- Nee Pon? × Rai Pon! (2007)

==== By Navel Honeybell ====
- Sora Tobu Hitsuji to Manatsu no Hana: When Girls Wish Upon A Star. (2014)
- Magical ☆ Dears (2015)

==== By Lime & Lime Vert ====
- Nostradamus ni Kiite Miro (2008)
- Maximum Magic (2010)
- Peta Peta (2010)
- Love☆Kiss (2011)
- ××× na Kanojo ga Inaka Seikatsu wo Mankitsu Suru Himitsu no Hōhō (2012)
- Royal Duty/Flush (2013)

=== Others ===
- Marriage Royale
- Judgement Chime
