= Tick! Tack! =

2005 video game

- Developer(s): Navel
- Publisher(s): (Japan) Navel (Europe) MangaGamer (United States) MangaGamer
- Series: Shuffle!
- Platform(s): Windows
- Release: ^{JPN}October 16, 2005^{EUR}April 26, 2013^{USA}March 17, 2014
- Genre(s): Visual novel, Eroge
- Mode(s): Single player

Tick! Tack! is the second eroge visual novel in the Shuffle! series created by Navel for Microsoft Windows. The game is the first sequel to Navel's first game, Shuffle!, continuing Nerine's path.

The basic set-up is that Rin, Nerine, Itsuki, and Mayumi find a strange watch that transports them back in time, where they met Forbesii before he is married and has Nerine. While he is engaged to Ai, his maid, Sage, is also in love with him, causing a love triangle. The players actions determine who Forbesii ultimately ends up with, and thus who is the mother of Nerine.

== Nerine Watch system ==
Just like in Shuffle!, the player will encounter events that will ask them to choose some option. Choosing one of them may cause an event to happen, while choosing the other may not have any effect on the game. This feature returns in Tick! Tack!. However, the company has included a new feature by displaying an antique watch on the top left-hand side of the screen. This watch is a gauge that shows the player Nerine's changes as a result of the player's meddling with the past.

When the player chooses an option, the watch will either tick counter-clockwise (the green side, by making random contacts with all the characters), clockwise (the red side, usually by making contact with Sage and diverting her interest away from Forbesii), or may not tick at all. When the green or red gauge reaches a certain level (around either 3 or 9 o'clock), Nerine will change her form to either the red-haired form or the "lolita" form. There are also reports that if the player plays Nerine's route correctly, both green and red will be full and synchronized, this phenomenon will temporarily change Nerine to her clone, Lycoris.

== Characters ==
=== Returning characters ===
Rin Tsuchimi (土見稟, Tsuchimi Rin)
The protagonist of this game as he was in Shuffle!. The player assumes the role of Rin as Nerine's lover. A change in history has changed Nerine's appearance (and parentage). In order to restore Nerine to her previous self, Rin must try to correct history.

Nerine (ネリネ, Nerine)
The princess of the makai world, Forbesii's daughter, and the person whose destiny is the main focus of this game. Rin and Nerine are lovers. A change in her past has resulted in her having a different personality and a slightly different appearance. The player meets three different versions of her in the game depending on the decisions that are made.

Lycoris (リコリス, Rikorisu)
Artificial life form No. 2, Nerine's clone. The ‘hidden character’ of the game. The only physical difference between her and Nerine is eye color: her eyes purple/violet while Nerine's are red.

Forbesii (フォーベシイ, Fōbeshii)
Makai's young prince and future king. He is torn between loving Ai and Sage, and it's the player's involvement that determines who he chooses to marry.

Mayumi Thyme (麻弓＝タイム, Mayumi Taimu)
Rin's classmate and friend.

Itsuki Midoriba (緑葉 樹, Midoriba Itsuki)
Rin's classmate and friend.

=== New characters ===
Sage (セージ, Sēji)
Forbesii's maid who is involved in a love triangle. She is the 'original' Nerine's mother.

Ai (アイ, Ai)
Forbesii's fiancée who is the third member of the love triangle. Her hair and eyes match Nerine's.

Cineraria (サイネリア, Saineria)
Forbesii's sister. Eustoma's future wife and Lisianthus’ mother.

Bark (バーク, Bāku)
Forbesii's butler.

== Music ==
Opening Theme: Be Ambitious, Guys!, by Miyuki Hashimoto.

Closing Theme: Never Say Goodbye, by YURIA.

Insert Song: Pieces, by Miyuki Hashimoto.

== Adaptations ==
Tick! Tack! received a manga adaptation titled Tick! Tack!: Never Say Goodbye which ran in Comp Ace.

Tick! Tack! also has a novel titled Tick! Tack!:サンダーキックな恋物語 (Thunder Kick-like Love Story)
