= Cherry Petals Fall Like Teardrops =

2002 Japanese video game

それは舞い散る桜のように (Sore wa Maichiru Sakura no Yōni)
- Genre: Romance, Harem
- Video game
- Developer: BasiL
- Publisher: BasiL
- Genre: Eroge, Visual novel
- Platform: Windows
- Released: JP: August 9, 2002 (Windows)
- Manga

Sore wa Maichiru Sakura no Yōni Anthology Comic
- Written by: Shindai Chakayama; Yūgi Kusanagi; Shinki Kitsutsuki; Sato Masaki; Ou Jackson; Ofū Yamadori; Namori; Masou Kirishi
- Published by: Enterbrain
- Imprint: Magi-Cu Comics
- Published: December 28, 2002
- Volumes: 1
- Light novel
- Written by: Nikaido Kageyama
- Illustrated by: Aoi Nishimata
- Published by: Harvest
- Original run: June 1, 2003 – August 1, 2003
- Volumes: 3

Cherry Petals Fall Like Teardrops (それは舞い散る桜のように, Sore wa Maichiru Sakura no Yōni) is the third and last game developed by eroge maker BasiL, after their second installment 21-Two One-, before dissolving into what is now Navel. The game was released as a DVD ROM on August 9, 2002. The characters were designed and drawn by Aoi Nishimata. A comic anthology entitled Sore wa Maichiru Sakura no Yōni Anthology Comic, has been published by Enterbrain under their Majikyu Comics imprint, and drawn by multiple artists. The single tankōbon volume was published on December 28, 2002. Three light novels based on the game have been published by Harvest, written by Nikaido Kageyama, and illustrated by Aoi Nishimata, the main artist of the game. The first light novel volume was published on June 1, 2003, and the last was published on August 1, 2003. Other media such as visual fan books, drama CDs, and music CDs have also been produced.

== Gameplay ==
Cherry Petals Fall Like Teardrops is a romance visual novel where the player assumes the role of Maito Sakurai, the main protagonist of the game. Much of its gameplay is spent reading the game's narrative and dialogue. The game follows standard visual novel gameplay, which means the player can attain various different endings, and depending on the decisions that the player makes during the game, the plot will progress in a specific direction.

Throughout gameplay, the player is given multiple options to choose from, and text progression pauses at these points until a choice is made. To view all plot lines in their entirety, the player will have to replay the game multiple times and choose different choices to further the plot to an alternate direction.

== Character ==
Nozumi Hoshizaki (星崎 希望, Hoshizaki Nozumi)
Voiced by: Rumiko Sasa
A second year high school student. She is in the same class as Maito. She is cheerful and kind, and good-looking to boot. She is popular, and is worshiped and called a princess by all the school's boys. She is also friendly, and often cracks jokes with Maito.
Komachi Yukimura (雪村 小町, Yukimura Komachi)
Voiced by: Shino Kujō
A first year high school student. Before Maito moved, she was his neighbor and childhood friend. She has a carefree and chatty personality.
Tsubasa Yaegashi (八重樫 つばさ, Yaegashi Tsubasa)
Voiced by: Eri Kushibiki
A second year high school student. She is Maito's friend and has been in the same class as him for two years. She excels at both schoolwork and sports. Her personality is lively, noisy, and rough.
Satomi Kodama (里見 こだま, Satomi Kodama)
Voiced by: Saki Takayama
A third year high school student. She is a senpai who is full of chances to tease. Since she is baby-faced, short, and has little authority, she doesn't seem older. Her future dream is to be a young adult author. She is too serious and has a habit of preaching.
Aoba Mori (森 青葉, Mori Aoba)
Voiced by: Mari Kusunoki
A third year high school student. She is a senpai who is full of chances to tease. Since she is baby-faced, short, and has little authority, she doesn't seem older. Her future dream is to be a young adult author. She is too serious and has a habit of preaching.
