= Shuffle! =

Japanese visual novel developed by Nave, 2003

- Shuffle! original visual novel cover
- Genre: Drama, fantasy, romantic comedy
- Manga

Shuffle! Days in the Bloom
- Written by: Navel
- Illustrated by: Shiroi Kusaka
- Published by: Kadokawa Shoten
- Magazine: Comptiq
- Original run: December 2003 – December 2006
- Volumes: 6
- Video game
- Developer: Navel
- Publisher: Navel (Windows); Kadokawa Shoten (PS2); MangaGamer (Windows); YumeHaven (Windows)
- Genre: Eroge, Visual novel
- Platform: Windows, PS2
- Released: JP: January 30, 2004; WW: August 15, 2009
- Light novel
- Written by: Seishi Ogata
- Illustrated by: Shiroi Kusaka; Aoi Nishimata; Hiro Suzuhira (cover illustrations)
- Published by: Kadokawa Shoten
- Original run: June 8, 2004 – January 10, 2006
- Volumes: 7
- Anime television series
- Directed by: Naoto Hosoda
- Produced by: Tokuji Sasegawa; Tomoko Suzuki; Tsuneo Taketomo; Chiaki Terada
- Written by: Masashi Suzuki
- Music by: Acchorike (Navel); Kazuhiko Sawaguchi; Minoru Maruo
- Studio: Asread
- Licensed by: NA: Funimation
- Original network: Wowow
- Original run: July 7, 2005 – January 5, 2006
- Episodes: 24
- Anime television series

Shuffle! Memories
- Directed by: Naoto Hosoda
- Produced by: Tomoko Suzuki; Tsuneo Taketomo; Chiaki Terada
- Written by: Masashi Suzuki
- Music by: Acchorike (Navel); Kazuhiko Sawaguchi; Minoru Maruo
- Studio: Asread
- Original network: CTC, TVS, tvk, KBS, SUN, Tokyo MX, TVA, AT-X
- Original run: January 7, 2007 – March 25, 2007
- Episodes: 12

Shuffle! (stylized in all caps) is a Japanese visual novel developed by Navel. It was originally released as an adult game for Windows on January 30, 2004. It was subsequently followed by an all-ages release for the PlayStation 2 (PS2) and an expanded adult release for Windows. The Windows version was localized in English by MangaGamer in 2009, and the PS2 version was localized in English by YumeHaven in 2016 on Steam. The gameplay in Shuffle! follows a branching plot line that offers pre-determined scenarios and courses of interaction and focuses on the appeal of the female main characters. Shuffle! has been re-made into an expanded version called Shuffle! Essence+. It has expanded routes for the original five main heroines and new routes for six other characters. Shuffle! also has three spin-off sequels: Tick! Tack!, Really? Really! and Shuffle! Love Rainbow.

Shuffle! has made several transitions to other media. There have been two manga series based on the visual novel. The first was serialized in Kadokawa Shoten's magazine Comptiq between December 2003 and 2006. The second was a comic anthology published by Kadokawa Shoten between July 2004 and December 2005. Two anime adaptations were produced by the animation studio Asread. The first anime was twenty-four episodes in length and was broadcast in Japan between July 2005 and January 2006. The second series was a twelve-episode readaptation broadcast between January and March 2007. Seven light novels, two fan books, nine drama CDs, and seven radio drama CD adaptations have also been produced.

The visual novel was well received, whereas the first anime adaptation received mixed reviews. Across the national semi-monthly ranking of bishōjo games in amount sold in Japan, the limited edition of Shuffle! premiered in second place at the time of its release and remained in the top 50 for an additional three and a half months. The standard edition premiered in ninth place at the time of its release and remained in the top 50 for a further three half-months. Critics of the anime series were divided between whether or not the anime series set itself apart from other series in the harem genre and the quality of its audio and visual aspects.

== Gameplay ==
Example of what average conversation looks like in Shuffle! Here, Rin is talking with Asa.

The gameplay mostly consists of reading and listening to the conversations provided. Now and then, a "Please Select Your Destiny" event will occur, giving the player multiple choices on how to respond. The choices will determine who will be Rin's destined love; depending on which route the player takes, there will be between 8 and 12 multiple-choice questions. At a certain point in the visual novel, a translucent image of the destined character appears when the day changes indicating whom Rin has fallen in love with after which the multiple-choice events become almost nonexistent. Near the end of the game, two sex scenes will occur. After the story has been completed at least once, players can view CG (computer graphics) artwork they have observed, skip scenes or endings for characters they have viewed, and listen to the soundtracks they have heard in the game.

The PlayStation 2 version varies from the PC version as all the sex scenes are removed. The player may follow two new storylines: Mayumi Thyme's and Kareha's. Additionally, Kareha's younger sister Tsubomi makes her first appearance in the PS2 version during Kareha's path.

Shuffle! Essence+ allows the player to follow the storylines of seven heroines, including four new storylines: Tsubomi's, Sakura Yae's, Nadeshiko Benibara's and Daisy's. In Daisy's path, Erica Suzuran makes her first appearance as a secondary character and Ruri Matsuri appears as the second main heroine, but she does not have any sex scenes.

== Plot ==
=== Setting and themes ===
The story is set in a fictional universe where humans coexist with god and devil races. Both races are capable of mystical powers, which astounded humans since they had never seen anything like it. Despite their positive and negative stereotypes, both parties are essentially good-natured. Ten years before the story, the gateway between the worlds of the gods and devils was opened. Since then, people from all races have been immigrating between the worlds. The characters attend the multi-racial high school, National Verbena Academy (バーベナ学園, Bābena Gakuen) in Kōyō-chō (光陽町; lit. Sunshine Town). All of this is done so that humans, gods, and devils can meet one another and learn to coexist peacefully. Nonetheless, some members of each race had been transported to one of the other worlds, where they married and had children due to mysterious dimensional tears. This is how some students with mixed lineage can be older than the gateway to the human world, such as Mayumi Thyme, whose human parent fell into the world of the Devils through one of those tears years before the gateway to the Human world was opened, and Ama Shigure, Asa's mother. She was somehow transported from the world of the Devil to the Human world.

Shuffle! contains a leitmotif of allusions to flowers. All of the characters' names are references to flowers in some way, mostly genera of flowering plants.

=== Main characters ===
Rin Tsuchimi, the protagonist of the story, is an average seventeen-year-old second-year high school student. Since a young age, he has placed the well-being of others before his own and dislikes seeing people in sorrow. Since he lost his parents in childhood, he has been living with Kaede Fuyou, a life many of his classmates envied. One of the heroines of Shuffle!, Kaede believes her duty in life is to take care of Rin, which she takes upon herself to atone for her treatment of him in the past and bears a one-sided love towards Rin. Kaede appears again as the heroine in Really? Really!, a sequel to Shuffle!, that continues from Kaede's ending in Shuffle!. In middle school, the two meet and later befriend Asa Shigure, another heroine of Shuffle! who is in her third year of high school. While she has a weak constitution, she makes up for it with her energetic tomboy personality and is an excellent cook. She has a habit of slapping Rin on his back.

CG art scene of Kareha and Tsubomi that appears in Shuffle! On the Stage. For this screenshot, the text has been hidden to allow for an unobstructed view of the art, a common feature of visual novels.

At the story's onset, two girls Rin had met once during his childhood came to his school as transfer students and began living as his next-door neighbors. Lisianthus, a heroine of Shuffle!, is an energetic and enthusiastic person who can start a conversation with anyone. She comes to the human world as a possible marriage candidate for Rin and as the daughter of the Lord of Gods, thankful for his kindness to her in the past. Similarly, Nerine, who is also a heroine, is a reserved girl with a beautiful voice and a capable magic user. She also comes to the human world to be a marriage candidate for Rin as the daughter of the Devil King. Nerine appears again as a heroine in Navel's game, Tick! Tack!, a sequel to Shuffle!, which continues from Nerine's ending. Soon after the two daughters come to his school, Rin meets Primula, a strange, soft-spoken girl who often carries a stuffed cat around.

Two new storylines are available in the PlayStation 2 version of the game. Mayumi Thyme is a heterochromia-eyed girl who is half-devil and half-human. She is Rin's classmate and is always searching for news. She takes pride in her smallest bust size, a fact often made fun of by Rin and Itsuki, claiming them to be a rarity sought after by a select group of men. Kareha is of the god race and is Asa's friend and classmate who enjoys making sweets and taking on related part-time jobs. Whenever she sees something romantic or cute, she has a habit of saying "Ma Ma Maa!" and starts to daydream, losing awareness of her surroundings.

In Shuffle! Essence+, there are four new storylines available in the game. Tsubomi is Kareha's younger sister, and like Kareha, she tends to space out when she sees something romantic or cute. Her catchphrase is "Kya! Kya! Kya!". She's the same age as Primula, so they quickly become friends. Sakura is Rin's and Kaede's childhood friend; they have known each other since elementary school. That's why she knows about Rin's and Kaede's tragic past. Nadeshiko is Rin's homeroom teacher. She's confident, firmly stepping on the ground, single, attractive, and frequently the victim of pickup lines, including from the Devils King and Itsuki. It appears she has some martial arts training (being able to slice a bottle with her bare hand). She has a habit of punishing students harshly, such as writing 100-page reports and dragging a tire around the track for minor offenses. However, when speaking about romantic relationships or cuteness, she can become shy, especially when someone talks about her. Daisy is Sia's cousin. When they were kids, they used to play a lot together. However, because of some circumstances between their fathers, they stopped playing together. Daisy remembers the precious for her time she spends with Lisianthus. However, Sia seems to have forgotten the old days they were together.

=== Story ===
The storyline of Shuffle! follows the life of Rin Tsuchimi, a normal seventeen-year-old second-year (Note: Japanese schools consist of three years of study.) high school student who finds himself sought after by a variety of girls. Eight years prior to the onset of the story, he lost his parents in a car accident that also took the life of Kaede Fuyou's mother. From that point onwards, he began living with Kaede. At around the same time he lost his parents, he met Lisianthus and Nerine at different times who each were accompanying their fathers on a diplomatic business in the human world. Each girl became lost after wandering through the human world. During that time, Rin befriended each girl after playing with them for a day. As a result of his kindness, Rin finds himself as the potential marriage candidate for both Lisianthus and Nerine, the daughters of the king of the gods and king of the demon worlds, who recently transfer to Rin's school at the onset of the story.

== Development ==
Shuffle! is the first project developed by the visual novel developer Navel, and is the first title in the series. Shuffle!'s development team was largely composed of members involved with Basil's Cherry Petals Fall Like Teardrops. The scenarios were written by Baria Ago, who had previously been in charge of writing the scenario for Cherry Petals Fall Like Teardrops and Long Cube. Art direction and character design was split between Aoi Nishimata, who had previously illustrated Cherry Petals Fall Like Teardrops, and Hiro Suzuhira. The music for the game was composed by Nachtmusik. The opening video was produced by Iris Motion Graphics.

The limited edition was released on January 30, 2004 and came with a special artbook featuring original drawings of the cast by twelve guest artists and a special edition box. The normal edition was released on February 27, 2004 on one DVD instead of three CDs and came with an original Shirotama & Kurotama keychain. The Standard Edition was released on December 17, 2004 on one DVD. An Anniversary Edition was released on November 22, 2007 and comes with a phone card of Sia and Kikyō. The PlayStation 2 version Shuffle! On the Stage was released in two versions on October 20, 2005: the regular version including the game and the DX version that included a 12 cm figure of Lisianthus, a Shuffle! On the Stage Mix soundtrack CD, and a cell phone cleaner. The development of a Windows port of Shuffle! On the Stage titled Shuffle! Essence+ was announced on May 9, 2008 and released on October 30, 2009.

MangaGamer released an uncensored, English translation of the visual novel on August 15, 2009. On November 22, 2016, YumeHaven released an English-translated port of the PlayStation 2 version worldwide on Steam. Both versions have been discontinued and are no longer available to purchase, citing a change in management and publishing agreements respectively for the MangaGamer and Steam versions.

== Adaptations ==
=== Manga ===
Written by and illustrated by Shiroi Kusaka, a manga adaptation of Shuffle! titled Shuffle! Days in the Bloom [sic] was first serialized monthly in Comptiq in December 2003, a month before the release of the visual novel, until its conclusion in December 2006. The twenty-six chapters were then compiled by Kadokawa Shoten into six tankōbon volumes, which were later released from August 8, 2004 to January 10, 2007. A second manga series, a comic anthology titled Shuffle! Comic à la Carte (SHUFFLE! コミックアラカルト) written by Comptiq's Editorial Department, was published across five tankōbon volumes by Kadokawa Shoten between July 8, 2004 and December 10, 2005. The cover illustrations were provided by Aoi Nishimata and Hiro Suzuhira.

=== Audio dramas ===
A total of nine drama CD adaptations were released by Lantis for Shuffle! between 2004 and 2007. Five CDs were released monthly between May 26, 2004 and September 23, 2004, with each focused upon one of the five heroines of PC version of Shuffle!. Each drama CD contains between four and five tracks. For the PlayStation 2 version, an additional two CDs were released on February 22, 2006 and May 24, 2006, respectively, each focusing on Mayumi Thyme and Kareha, the two new heroines. For the second anime adaptation, Shuffle! Memories, two additional drama CDs were released on July 25, 2007 and October 24, 2007, focusing on Kaede Fuyou and Lisianthus, respectively. Three drama CDs appeared on the weekly Oricon albums chart of which the drama CD released for Shuffle! On the Stage focused on Kareha ranked the highest, peaking at #216 and remaining on the chart for one week.

A radio drama series titled Shuffle! Charadio: Verbena Academy Broadcasting Department began broadcasting weekly in September 2005, was hosted by Lisianthus and Nerine, and voiced by their respective voice actors. It was later released monthly by Lantis on five CDs between October 5, 2005 and February 8, 2006. A shortened anthology of their tracks was then collected across a two-CD compilation titled Shuffle! Charadio: Verbena Academy Broadcasting Department Petit released by Lantis on April 5, 2006 and June 7, 2006. Two of these releases charted on the weekly Oricon albums chart of which the compilation ranked the highest, peaking #130 and remaining on the chart for one week.

=== Books and publications ===
A series of seven character novels was published monthly by Kadokawa Shoten between June 8, 2004 and January 10, 2006 each focusing on each of seven heroines of Shuffle!, including the two introduced in the PlayStation 2 version. Each of the novels were written by Seishi Ogata and illisturated by Shiroi Kusaka with cover illustrations provided by Aoi Nishimata and Hiro Suzuhira.

A book titled "Shuffle! First Fanbook" (SHUFFLE!ファーストファンブック) (ISBN 978-4-7973-2649-9) was published by Softbank on January 22, 2004 containing a series of illustrations, character introductions, and a CD containing wallpapers and various messages voiced by each of the five main heroines of Shuffle!. Enterbrain published a fifty-eight-page book with a CD attachment titled "Shuffle! Visual Fanbook" (SHUFFLE!ビジュアルファンブック) in Tech Gian on June 9, 2004. It included detailed story explanations, seventy-eight illustrations for Shuffle!, a specially drawn A3 poster, and interviews with the creators. Softbank also published another book titled "Shuffle! Official Illustrations and Production Materials Collection" (SHUFFLE!公式原画・設定資料集) (ISBN 978-4-7973-2716-8) on July 10, 2004 collecting the computer graphics used in the game, production sketches, and information on character and world secrets. A book titled "Shuffle! On the Stage Official Visual Guide" (SHUFFLE! ON THE STAGE 公式ビジュアルガイド) (ISBN 978-4-04-707202-2) was released by Kadokawa Shoten on December 22, 2005. The book contained all the production sketches, concept art, and interviews with staff relating to the PS2 version of the visual novel compiled by Comptiq. Kadokawa Shoten released an additional book on April 10, 2006 titled "Shuffle! Anime Complete Album" (SHUFFLE!アニメコンプリートアルバム) (ISBN 978-4-04-853956-2) providing an introduction to the production of the anime adaptation of the visual novel, a detailed plot overview, and interviews with staff involved in the anime.

=== Anime ===
Naoto Hosoda directed a 24-episode anime adaptation of Shuffle! that was produced by Asread. A special prologue DVD was released on May 27, 2005. It was broadcast in Japan on WOWOW between July 7, 2005 and January 5, 2006. The anime combines elements from all of the characters' paths from the game into one plot, although it differs from the game by adding some elements, such as the idol clubs formed around Sia, Nerine, and Kaede, and removing others, such as the H-scenes. The anime's opening theme is "You" by Yuria, and the ending theme is "Innocence" by Miyuki Hashimoto. The series was released across twelve Region 2 DVD compilation volumes in Japan.

On January 1, 2007, Funimation Entertainment announced licensing the anime adaptation of Shuffle! for English-language dubbed release. Funimation released the series across six Region 1 DVD compilation volumes between February 26, 2008 and September 9, 2008. The sixth DVD volume featured an artbox and Lisianthus' "god" panties. Funimation later released a DVD boxset on March 31, 2009 compiling all the six DVD volumes.

The game was again adapted by Asread into a 12-episode anime series titled Shuffle! Memories directed by Naoto Hosoda and written by Masashi Suzuki. It was broadcast on Chiba TV and TV Saitama between January 6 and March 25, 2007. It is a recap of the original Shuffle! anime, rearranging scenes from the original series into individual character specific episodes, and contains very little original content aside from the last episode. It features 13 pieces of theme music performed by Yuria, Miyuki Hashimoto, and the respective voice actors for the five heroines of Shuffle!. It was released across seven region 2 DVD compilation volumes in Japan.

=== Merchandise ===
Kadokawa Shoten also released five boxsets, one for each of the five heroines of the PC version of Shuffle!, between September 10, 2005 and December 10, 2005. Each boxset was compiled by Comptiq and contained a book, clothed Figma figurines, drama CDs, and mousepad released for the visual novel, first anime adaptation, and manga adaptation for their respective characters.

== Music ==
The visual novel features two pieces of theme music. The PC version features "Mirage Lullaby" as its opening theme. The PS2 version features "Original!" as the opening theme. Both versions of the visual novel feature "Scramble!" as the ending theme. Each song was performed by Yuria. Both versions also feature "In the Sky" as the ending theme to the Nerine's path.

Several music albums for the novel and its adaptations have been released between 2004 and 2007 by Lantis. The game's original soundtrack was released in February 2004 containing two-discs with track thirty-one total tracks consisting of background music, the theme songs, and bonus remixes of the opening theme. Following a month after the release of the series of five drama CDs for the PC version of the game, Lantis released an album in October 2004 containing eleven tracks of character image songs, some of which were featured in the drama CD series, each performed by their respective voice actor. A remix album titled Rainbowremix followed in June 2005 released by Lantis containing eleven tracks of remixes of the opening theme for the PC version of the game by several artists. Two maxi singles containing the theme music used in the first anime adaptation titled "You" and "Innocence" were released in August 2005. In November 2005, a month after the initial release of the PS2 version of the game, was released its opening maxi single "Original!". A remix album titled Re-mix Album Composition Eleven containing eleven remixes by various artists followed in December 2005. An album titled Character Vocal Album was released in March 2006 containing thirteen new character image songs for many of the characters of the PS2 version of the game. In April 2007, a month after the conclusion of the second anime adaptation of the game Shuffle! Memories, an album titled Shuffle! Memories Character Song Collection was released containing twelve tracks of character songs performed by their respective voice actors. The original soundtrack for the second adaptation of the game was released in May 2007.

Most of the singles and albums ranked on Oricon charts with the highest ranking album being Shuffle! Memories Character Song Collection at 104th, and the highest ranking single being "Original!", the opening theme for Shuffle! On the Stage PS2 game, at 32nd.

== Reception ==
Shuffle! had much pre-sale hype as the development team was largely composed of former members of BasiL, including Hiro Suzuhira and Aoi Nishimata, the illustrators for Shuffle!. Shuffle! was released at around the same time as Fate/stay night, a highly anticipated visual novel by Type-Moon. The limited edition of Shuffle! was the second highest-selling computer game for the last two weeks of January 2004 the top 50 best-selling Bishōjo games semi-monthly sales chart in Japan, behind Fate/stay night. It then ranked 18th and 50th in February before dropping off the chart in the first two weeks of March at 40th. The regular edition of the PC version of Shuffle! premiered at 9th in the chart in the last two weeks of February. It then ranked 5th and 40th in March, before its last appearance at 49th in the first half of April. Shuffle! On the Stage was released on October 20, 2005 and sold well (for a visual novel) during its first week, selling 29,732 copies by October 23.

Getchu.com hosts a yearly voting poll called the "Getchu.com Bishōjo Game Ranking" where game users vote online for the best games of the previous year in several different categories. For the 2004 ranking, the categories were: overall, scenario, theme songs, background music, visuals, gameplay system, and heroines. Out of the seven, Shuffle! ranked in four. The game was voted 8th best overall, 11th best for its scenario, and 14th best for its gameplay system. Asa Shigure ranked as the 14th most popular heroine with Kaede Fuyou ranking 15th.

Reviewing the (English-language) MangaGamer version of the visual novel, John Rafael of NookGaming felt the story didn't meet his expectations due to underutilized story elements and a short runtime and that there were better romances available.

=== Anime ===
Shuffle! the anime television series received mixed reviews from critics. Theron Martin of Anime News Network described the anime as although "genuinely enjoyable", often "alternating between brazen stupidity, lame jokes, and disgusting sweetness" criticizing it as being a typical harem anime that offered little new content. Helen Ellingwood of Active Anime disagreed stating that Shuffle! contained what she described as the most important ingredient, which sets it apart from other harem anime: "heart". Anime News Network's Carlo Santos agreed with Martin's assessment, agreeing with the show's lack of novelty and stating that the highlight of the anime is its comedy, but that its romance is "slowly running the series into the ground." However, D. F. Smith of IGN stated that it actually does well against other harem anime as it "may be ridiculous, exploitative, a simultaneous affront to good sense and good taste, but at least it's good for a chuckle or two". Smith criticized the ending for lacking "intensity"; however, Ellingwood praised it for showing the consequences of avoiding which heroine the protagonist would choose to love, unlike harem anime she had prior.

Ellingwood praised the animation quality as "high quality" with "wonderfully lush and vibrant color schemes" used for the character designs. Smith agreed, describing the anime as "colorful" and "sharply-drawn", however in the last few episodes as having darkened the scenes a little excessively. However, Martin criticized the "mediocre" animation noting the "bland" appearance of characters as uncharacteristic of harem anime. Santos stated that the animation was "sloppy" for the secondary characters, however praised the high quality and detail of the artwork. Although Ellingwood described the score as "energetic and pleasing", Smith stated that the music "tends to stick to the background". Martin expressed a similar view stating that the soundtrack "does little to spruce up the production", although he described the opening theme "You" as "a strong, energetic J-rock number worth listening to independently" and as "unquestioningly" the highlight of the soundtrack. On the other hand, Santos described the theme music and at times the music selection as "show[ing] absolutely no originality" but the background music as "surprisingly listenable" and at times "so evocative that it conveys the scene better than the story and characters do."

=== Legacy ===
A 3D virtual world called Ai Sp@ce was developed by the video game developer Headlock where users can interact with bishōjo game heroines from Shuffle!, Clannad, and Da Capo II. Released in October 2008, the world recreates each game franchise on its own virtual island which are linked with a central Akihabara Island where users can interact, bridging the gap between the separate franchises. Users are able to create a customizable avatar to represent themselves in the game, along with choosing one game heroine to live with, which is referred to as a character doll, or chara-doll for short. The user and chara-doll reside together on one of the three in-game "islands" depending on which franchise the heroine is from, which includes a house with furniture and clothes that can be purchased. The chara-dolls can also be customizable in that they can develop a unique personality for each user.

It has been followed by spin-offs and sequels including Tick! Tack!, Really? Really!, Shuffle! Love Rainbow, Shuffle! Episode 2, and Princess x Princess.
