= Really? Really! =

Video game

- Logo
- Genre: Mystery, Fantasy, Romance
- Video game
- Developer: Navel
- Publisher: Navel (Windows); Kadokawa Shoten (DS); MangaGamer (Windows)
- Genre: Visual novel, Eroge (Windows)
- Platform: Windows, Nintendo DS
- Released: November 24, 2006 (limited edition); April 17, 2007 (standard edition); June 25, 2009 (DS Edition); June 6th, 2014 (MangaGamer)
- Manga
- Written by: Navel
- Illustrated by: Shiroi Kusaka
- Published by: Kadokawa Shoten
- Original run: January 10, 2007 – December 10, 2007
- Volumes: 2

Really? Really! is the third eroge visual novel in the Shuffle! series created by Navel for Microsoft Windows. It is a continuation of Kaede's path from the first Shuffle! visual novel, and has a linear plot. The limited edition was released on November 24, 2006, at a retail price of ¥9,240 (about US$79.73). Navel released a "soft" version (without explicit sexual content, like Shuffle! On The Stage for Shuffle!) of Really? Really! on Nintendo DS in 2009. The DS version was released on June 25, 2009, by Kadokawa Shoten. It was localized by MangaGamer and released on June 6, 2014 (PC version only).

== Gameplay ==
Rin Tsuchimi parodies the Ace Attorney series (also known as the Phoenix Wright series) during a 'Really!' sequence. More than just a passing homage, the 'Really!' system is actually a major aspect of Really? Really!.

In Really? Really!, Kaede has lost her memories, and throughout the game, the player must fix them. Using keywords acquired from viewing various events in Kaede's memories, the player must fix mistakes in Kaede's past memories.

The player starts at a "crossroad" where different doors are available. By going through the events beyond the doors and correcting memories with the keywords earned on the way, the player receives a "memory" which he can "liberate" by watching.

As stated in the picture, the game has a lot of similarities to the Ace Attorney series.

For example, the first mistake that occurs is that Kaede says that Midoriba Itsuki is a girl (he is actually a boy). By using the 'Really Attack', the player can select the 'Midoriba Itsuki' keyword, which causes Rin to say "OBJECTION!" which then causes the scene to shatter and replay correctly.

The player is allowed five errors per day to get the memories corrected. In order to get the CG for the scene, the player must have a 100% completion. If the player makes five errors in a day, the game ends.

The player should also note that once he makes 3 mistakes out of the 5 allowed, the game allows a hint where the "life bar" flashes, notifying that a certain keyword must be used at this dialog. However, it does not reveal what keyword should be used, so it is possible that the player may not possess the keyword. In this case, he must "escape" and choose another path to find the keyword.

Should the player feel that he does not have the appropriate keyword for the situation, the player has the option of escaping the scene (and even that particular event/time entirely), and then coming back later upon acquiring more keywords. This is possible as the player usually has access to multiple events to play back and correct in the "event selection" area.

Upon completion of all the events of a day, the player is able to play back these memories from Kaede's point of view, providing interesting insights into her inner thoughts. This is the only time when Rin's lines are voiced. Other characters may also comment from time to time during these sequences (for example, after a H-scene that did not actually take place or during the time when Kaede falsely accused Rin of killing her mother, up to the point when she finally finds out the truth) or even alter them (Mayumi enlarging her breast size multiple times and getting caught, providing comic relief).

== Characters ==
=== Main characters ===
The entire cast of Really? Really!

Rin Tsuchimi (土見稟, Tsuchimi Rin)
The protagonist of the previous games and this one, which the player assumes the role of.

Kaede Fuyou (芙蓉楓, Fuyō Kaede)
The main female character of the story. She enters a coma and has her memories scrambled after an accident involving Primula's use of magic.

Sakura Yae (八重桜, Yae Sakura)
A new character to the series. A childhood friend of Rin and Kaede who attended the same schools as both of them up till their middle school graduation, where she left both to attend an all-girls high school.

Momiji Fuyou (芙蓉紅葉, Fuyō Momiji)
Kaede Fuyou's mother. She guides Rin's group through the process of fixing Kaede's memories and facilitates entry into them.

Primula (プリムラ, Purimura)

Asa Shigure (時雨亜沙, Shigure Asa)

Mayumi Thyme (麻弓＝タイム, Mayumi Taimu)
Mayumi's first game with H (hentai) scenes.

Nadeshiko Benibara (紅薔薇撫子, Benibara Nadeshiko)
Nadeshiko's first game, where she is one of the selectable girls.

=== Secondary characters ===
Lisianthus (リシアンサス, Rishiansasu)

Nerine (ネリネ, Nerine)

Ama Shigure (時雨亜麻, Shigure Ama)
Asa Shigure's mother. She appears nude in a few CG scenes this time.

Kareha (カレハ, Kareha)

Tsubomi (ツボミ, Tsubomi)
Kareha's younger sister.

Sage (セージ, Sēji)
The only returning character introduced in Tick! Tack!. In the original timeline of Tick! Tack!, she is Nerine's mother and the love interest of Forbessi.

Eustoma (ユーストマ, Yūsutoma)
Lisianthus's father.

Forebesii (フォーベシイ, Fōbeshii)
Nerine's father and Demon Lord from the Demon World.

Itsuki Midoriba (緑葉樹, Midoriba Itsuki)

Mikio Fuyou (芙蓉幹夫, Fuyō Mikio)
Kaede Fuyou's father. A new character.

== Music ==
Opening Theme: Remember memories, by YURIA.

Insert Song: Ageless Love, by Miyuki Hashimoto

Ending Theme: Happy Dream, by YURIA.

== Ports ==
The game was ported to the Nintendo DS by both Navel and its distributor, Kadokawa Shoten. The game differs from the Windows version as all the sex scenes are removed (but the game still features sexual content), and the controls were changed to use the touchscreen.
