= Verbena (disambiguation) =

Verbena is a genus of plants in the family Verbenaceae

Verbena may also refer to:

== Plants ==
- Of the family Verbenaceae:
  - Lemon verbena, Aloysia citrodora
  - Mock verbenas, genus Glandularia
  - Pineapple verbena, Nashia inaguensis
  - Shrub verbenas, genus Lantana
- Other families:
  - Sand-verbenas, genus Abronia
  - Sweet verbena-tree or -myrtle, Backhousia citriodora

== Places ==
- Verbena, Alabama, a historic district listed on the National Register of Historic Places in Chilton County, Alabama
- Verbena, Dublin a suburban area on the northside of Dublin
- Verbena Heights, a public housing estate in Tseung Kwan O, Hong Kong
- St. Verbena, a chapel in Dawn of the Dead (2004 film)

== People ==
Verbena is a somewhat uncommon given name or a family name:

- Verbena, the character of Una Merkel in The Parent Trap (1961 film)
- Verbena, a character in Ray Billingsley's Curtis (comic strip)
- Dr. Verbena Beeks, a character from Quantum Leap played by Candy Brown Houston
- Verbena Singlefoot, a character in the 1925 movie Should Sailors Marry? played by Fay Holderness
- Alvaro Verbena, mayor of Deruta, Italy

== Other ==
- Verbena (band), a rock band from Alabama
- Verbena (fair), a country fair or dance party, especially one held at night, in Spanish-speaking cultures
- Verbena (Mage: the Ascension), a tradition from the role-playing game Mage: The Ascension
- La verbena de la Paloma, 1894 zarzuela by Tomás Bretón
- La Verbena, a 1927 painting by Maruja Mallo
- Verbena (English title: Madrid Carnival), 1941 film by Edgar Neville
- Verbena, a 2002 novel by Nanci Kincaid
- HMS Verbena (1915), a Royal Navy Arabis-class sloop
- HMS Verbena (K85), a Royal Navy Group 1 Flower-class corvette
- USS Verbena (1864), a US Navy vessel
- "Verbena Academy" (バーベナ学園, Bābena Gakuen) in the computer game Shuffle!
- "Canto della Verbena", commonly "la Verbena", a traditional song from Siena, Italy
  - The Charadio: Verbena Academy Broadcasting Department Shuffle! musical albums
- Verbena Consulting, a member of the Open Knowledge Initiative
