= Kikyō =

Kikyō may refer to:

- Platycodon, species of herbaceous flowering perennial plant native to East Asia
- Kikyō Station, JR railway station in Hakodate, Hokkaido, Japan

== Works ==
- Kikyō (novel), 1948 Japanese novel by Jirō Osaragi
- Kikyō (film) (帰郷), 1950 Japanese film for which Shin Saburi won the Mainichi Film Award for Best Actor
- "Kikyō", 1992 chapter of manga series Master Keaton
- "Kikyō" or "The Return", 2003 chapter of manga series Naruto
- "Kikyō", 2005 episode of anime series Shuffle!
- "Kikyō" or "Back to the City", 2008 chapter of manga series Boys on the Run
- "Kikyō" or "Homecoming", 2008 episode of anime series D.Gray-man
- "Kikyō", 2008 episode of Marvel Anime
- "Kikyō" or "Homecoming", 2014 chapter of manga series Vinland Saga
- Kikyo – The Return (Japanese: 帰郷, Kikyō), 2019 film adapted from Shuhei Fujisawa's story

== Fictional characters ==
- Kikyo, recurring character in manga and anime series Inuyasha
- Kikyō Yoshikawa, character in light novel series A Certain Magical Index
- Kikyo Zoldyck, character in manga series Hunter × Hunter
- Kikyō, real name of Gengan in anime series Koihime Musō

== See also ==
- Kikyō-mon, gate in Edo Castle, Tokyo
- Article about the 1950 film on Japanese Wikipedia
