= List of Shuffle! episodes =

Cover of the first DVD volume of Shuffle as released by Happinet Pictures on October 28, 2005

Shuffle! is an anime series adapted from the visual novel of the same title by Navel. Produced by Asread and directed by Naoto Hosoda, the series was broadcast on WOWOW from July 7, 2005, to January 5, 2006, and continued its run on Chiba Television Broadcasting and Television Saitama with Shuffle! Memories from January 6 to March 25, 2007. It follows the adventures of Rin Tsuchimi and his friends Kaede Fuyou, Asa Shigure, Lisianthus, Nerine and Primula. The anime combines elements from the characters' paths from the game into one plot, although it differs from the game by adding some elements, such as the idol clubs formed around Sia, Nerine, and Kaede, and removing others, such as the H-scenes. A DVD containing an animated short, titled Shuffle! Prologue was released on May 27, 2005. Happinet Pictures released Shuffle! on twelve DVD compilations, each containing two episodes, between October 28, 2005, to September 29, 2006.

In 2007, Funimation licensed the anime adaptation of Shuffle! for an English-language dubbed release in North America. Funimation released the series across six Region 1 DVD compilation volumes from February 26 to September 9, 2008. The sixth DVD volume featured an artbox and Lisianthus' "god" panties. Funimation later released a DVD boxset on March 31, 2009, compiling all the six DVD volumes.

The background music for the series was composed by Acchorike, Kazuhiko Sawaguchi and Minoru Maruo. The prologue episode uses a single piece of theme music: the ending theme, titled "Mirage Lullaby", is performed by Yuria. The first season uses two pieces of theme music: an opening theme and ending theme. The opening theme, titled "You", is also performed by Yuria. The ending theme is "Innocence" performed by Miyuki Hashimoto.

== Shuffle! (2005-06) ==
No.	Title	Original release date
0	"Shuffle! Prologue"	May 2005
The story is introduced as the player meets Rin, the protagonist, and the five female leads.
1	"The Man Who Could Become a God or a Demon!"; Transliteration: "Kami ni mo Mazoku ni mo Nareru Otoko!" (Japanese: 神にも悪魔にもなれる男!)	July 7, 2005
The series begins with Rin Tsuchimi and Kaede Fuyou having their breakfast. On their way to Verbena Academy, they encounter a man belonging to Kaede's fan club, who is easily defeated. At Verbena Academy, Rin meets up with his friend Asa Shigure. During a discussion with classmates Itsuki Midoriba and Mayumi Thyme, Rin and Kaede learn about a rumor that a new transfer student is arriving to Verbena. After Rin finishes a lecture with Nadeshiko Benibara, she warns Rin about his evasiveness but tells him to not lose his willpower. Meanwhile, Mayumi informs the whole class that there are two female transfer students. While shopping a grocery store after school, Rin encounters a red-haired god named Lisianthus, and helps her get two packages of meat for a friend. Later, Rin encounters a blue-haired demon named Nerine singing on a swing and is impressed by her voice. The next day, Lisianthus and Nerine enter Benibara's classroom. Their parents Eustoma and Forbesii, who are respectively the kings of the gods and the demons, also arrive and introduce themselves. The kings informs Rin that he has been selected to marry either one at his own accord and that they have become Rin and Kaede's next-door neighbors.
2	"I Wanted to See You!"; Transliteration: "Aitakute!" (Japanese: 会いたくて!)	July 14, 2005
After a few days of adjusting to his new neighbors, Rin is starting to find it hard to cope with the recent changes in his life, as well as the fan clubs who are jealous of Rin's relationships with Sia, Nerine and Kaede. Eventually, he starts to walk to and from school alone and one day while walking from school he meets a young silver-haired girl named Primula from the Realm of the Demons who is very attached to him, literally. When she comes home with him later, it is decided that she will live in Kaede's house.
3	"Do You Remember?"; Transliteration: "Oboetemasu ka?" (Japanese: 憶えてますか?)	July 21, 2005
Summer is almost here, but first the students must go through their final exams. While everyone is studying, Sia gets some help from Rin, even though it's not much.
4	"Egg Omelet of Happiness!"; Transliteration: "Shiawase no Tamagoyaki!" (Japanese: 幸せのタマゴ焼き!)	July 28, 2005
During the time when Rin and his classmates are cleaning their classroom, Nerine gets angry at a couple of guys insulting Rin and blows up the gym. Later, when a picnic is planned where everyone makes their own food to eat, Nerine must get help from Asa in order to learn how to cook.
5	"Where I Belong"; Transliteration: "Watashi no Ibasho" (Japanese: 私の居場所)	August 4, 2005
With the ever-increasing presence of Nerine and Sia in Rin's life, Kaede is beginning to feel left out. When Kaede comes down with a cold, she tries to push herself so as not to be so much of a bother to Rin. Multiple earthquakes occur in this episode.
6	"Smile!"; Transliteration: "Hohoemi!" (Japanese: 微笑み!)	August 11, 2005
With Rin and Kaede going to school so often, Primula is starting to miss Rin so one day she comes to school unannounced, though eventually leaves with some coaxing by Rin. Later, it is decided that Primula needs some undergarments she is lacking and thus Rin and the rest of the girls go out to help Primula with this problem. During their outing, Rin buys Primula a new cat doll.
7	"Romantic Scramble"; Transliteration: "Ren'ai Sukuranburu" (Japanese: 恋愛スクランブル)	August 18, 2005
After a popular boy confesses to Asa, she's finding it hard to accept his feelings. After Asa gets injured during PE, Rin walks her home and they're able to grow closer together.
8	"Panty Date"; Transliteration: "Pantsu de Dēto" (Japanese: パンツでデート)	August 25, 2005
Inspired by a horoscope she read, Sia decides to take the initiative and asks Rin out on a date. However, following the date as she planned it out earlier proves difficult as people they know keep on showing up.
9	"Survival Swimming at the Beach"; Transliteration: "Kaisuiyoku de Sabaibaru" (Japanese: 海水浴でサバイバル)	September 15, 2005
Now that summer's here, Rin and the girls have decided to go to the beach to have some fun. Everything goes smooth for a while, but when Rin and Sia are stranded offshore, what will they do?
10	"Moonlit Confession"; Transliteration: "Tsukiyo no Kokuhaku" (Japanese: 月夜の告白)	September 22, 2005
After what happened at the beach, rumors start flying around that Rin and Sia are to be wed. As emotions start flaring up, will the rumors turn out to be true?
11	"Girls of Summer"; Transliteration: "Natsu no O-jō-san-tachi" (Japanese: 夏のお嬢さんたち)	September 29, 2005
During the summer break, Mayumi goes to eat at the restaurant Kareha works at; unfortunately, she forgets her wallet, so she must work off her debt for the day. During this time, Rin's teacher is finding it difficult to find a good man to be with.
12	"Frozen Summer"; Transliteration: "Itetsuita Natsu" (Japanese: 凍てついた夏)	October 6, 2005
With the summer almost at an end, everyone is still trying to finish their summer homework before the deadline. Later on, Primula falls ill and Rin learns of her terrible past.
13	"House of Twilight"; Transliteration: "Shayō no Ie" (Japanese: 斜陽の家)	October 13, 2005
With Primula taken back to the Realm of the Demons, Rin and Kaede try to cope with their missing family member. Ultimately, Primula's condition comes out in the open and the one and only cure is revealed.
14	"Lycoris"; Transliteration: "Rikorisu" (Japanese: リコリス)	October 20, 2005
After Nerine ran to the nearby park, she tells Rin about the past she had with her clone Lycoris and how it all ties in with Primula. Later, after Asa collapsed at Kaede's house, Rin goes to see her at her own home where Asa tells him some of her own past.
15	"What Was Regained"; Transliteration: "Torimodoshita Mono" (Japanese: 取り戻したもの)	October 27, 2005
Rin, Kaede, Nerine and Sia have gone to the Demon Realm in order to see Primula again and try to help her in any way. Ultimately, things take a turn for the worse when she starts to lose control of the magic stored in her body. What can Rin do to save her?
16	"Kikyō"; Transliteration: "Kikyō" (Japanese: キキョウ)	November 3, 2005
While Rin is starting to spend more time with Asa, Sia is starting to feel that she's being left out. With nowhere else to turn, her other more assertive self surfaces and asks Rin out on a date.
17	"Honest Feelings"; Transliteration: "Sunao na Kimochi" (Japanese: 素直な気持ち)	November 10, 2005
After Sia's other self surfaces, Rin and she go out on a date completely led by Sia herself, with Rin more or less as her captive. How will Rin get out of this awkward situation? Meanwhile, the girls at school start to worry about where he's gone missing.
18	"The One Rin Loves"; Transliteration: "Rin no Suki na Hito" (Japanese: 稟の好きなヒト)	November 17, 2005
Rin goes out on a date at an amusement park targeted towards couples which is planned by Itsuki, Mayumi, Nerine and Sia so that Rin would voice how he feels towards Asa.
19	"Unforgettable Sentiments"; Transliteration: "Wasure Enu Omoi" (Japanese: 忘れ得ぬ思い)	November 24, 2005
Rin starts spending most of his time with Asa and completely ignores Kaede. Kaede's past is shown and her yandere personality is revealed.
20	"Indelible Sin"; Transliteration: "Wasurerarenu Tsumi" (Japanese: 忘れられぬ罪)	December 1, 2005
After Asa suffers another attack, Kaede starts to realize all that she's done in the past few days, but still cannot come to terms with where Rin's feelings truly lie. With almost nothing left, what will she do when told Rin may be leaving her house for good?
21	"Where Feelings Go"; Transliteration: "Kimochi no Yukue" (Japanese: 気持ちの行方)	December 8, 2005
Kaede has completely shut herself off from everyone, trying to think on what to do next. Before long, Primula finds that Kaede is gone and Primula runs to Rin to inform him. During her outing, she meets Asa and they have a talk about their feelings for Rin.
22	"Towards a New Tomorrow"; Transliteration: "Atarashii Ashita e" (Japanese: 新しい明日へ)	December 15, 2005
Rin has packed up all his things and has already found a cheap apartment to move into. On the day of the move, several of his friends come over and help him out.
23	"The Truth Revealed"; Transliteration: "Akasareta Shinjitsu" (Japanese: 明かされた真実)	December 22, 2005
After Asa collapses once more, she's rushed to the hospital, though the doctors cannot do much to improve her condition. Asa's mother Ama reveals to Rin a deep dark secret about her past.
24	"And...What Is Important"; Transliteration: "Soshite... Taisetsu na Koto" (Japanese: そして...大切なこと)	January 5, 2006
Asa escapes from the hospital and goes to the spot where Rin first confessed to her. Before long, Rin goes there to meet her, though there's still not much he can do. When all else has failed, Rin is prepared to do anything to save Asa.

== Shuffle! Memories (2007) ==
Shuffle! Memories is the next anime adaptation of Shuffle! which began airing on January 6, 2007. It primarily is a series of recap episodes that describes the events of Shuffle! for the main female characters. Only the last episode contains 100% original scenes.

No.	Title	Original release date
1	"Introduction Episode"; Transliteration: "Dōnyū Hen" (Japanese: 導入編)	January 6, 2007
This episode introduces the audience to the entire cast of characters and a little of the back story for the main characters. It's a basic overview of the Shuffle! story and universe.
2	"Fuyou Kaede Chapter Part 1"; Transliteration: "Fuyō Kaede Hen Zenpen" (Japanese: 芙蓉楓編 前編)	January 13, 2007
Kaede's story is explained from when she and Rin were kids to when they are in high school.
3	"Shigure Asa Chapter Part 1"; Transliteration: "Shigure Asa Hen Zenpen" (Japanese: 時雨亜沙編 前編)	January 20, 2007
Asa's story involving Rin is explained from how they first met to when Asa health starts deteriorating in high school. A bit of Asa's backstory with her mother Ama is touched upon as well.
4	"Nerine Chapter Part 1"; Transliteration: "Nerine Hen Zenpen" (Japanese: ネリネ編 前編)	January 27, 2007
Nerine's story is explained during the time that she got to know Rin up to the point where it seems that Sia and Rin are about to be wed.
5	"Lisianthus Chapter Part 1"; Transliteration: "Rishiansasu Hen Zenpen" (Japanese: リシアンサス編 前編)	February 3, 2007
Sia's story is explained from how she first met Rin as a child to the point where rumors start about them getting married soon.
6	"Primula Chapter Part 1"; Transliteration: "Purimura Hen Zenpen" (Japanese: プリムラ編 前編)	February 10, 2007
Primula's story is explained from how she first met Rin in the arcade to the point where Rin gave her a new cat doll. The time when the Rin and his friends went to the beach is briefly explained as well.
7	"Fuyou Kaede Chapter Part 2"; Transliteration: "Fuyō Kaede Hen Kōhen" (Japanese: 芙蓉楓編 後編)	February 17, 2007
The rest of Kaede's story is explained from the point where Rin started seeing more of Asa to after Rin decided to move out of Kaede's house.
8	"Shigure Asa Chapter Part 2"; Transliteration: "Shigure Asa Hen Kōhen" (Japanese: 時雨亜沙編 後編)	February 24, 2007
The rest of Asa's story is explained from the point when Rin and she have their first date to when Asa finally used her magic to save Rin's life.
9	"Nerine Chapter Part 2"; Transliteration: "Nerine Hen Kōhen" (Japanese: ネリネ編 後編)	March 3, 2007
The rest of Nerine's story is explained from the point when Primula was taken back to the demon world to when Nerine told him about Lycoris.
10	"Lisianthus Chapter Part 2"; Transliteration: "Rishiansasu Hen Kōhen" (Japanese: リシアンサス編 後編)	March 10, 2007
The rest of Sia's story is explained from the point when Kikyō and Rin go on a date to when Sia finally confesses her love to Rin, but Rin already likes Asa at this point.
11	"Primula Chapter Part 2"; Transliteration: "Purimura Hen Kōhen" (Japanese: プリムラ編 後編)	March 17, 2007
The rest of Primula's story is explained from the point when she returns to the human world healed to when Rin has already moved out of Kaede's house.
12	"Extra Chapter"; Transliteration: "Bangai Hen" (Japanese: 番外編)	March 24, 2007
Rin and everyone take a trip on a ship in the God's Realm, but before long Rin and Nerine go missing. Fearing something has happened to them, Kaede, Asa, Sia, and Mayumi try to search for them.

== Opening and ending themes ==
=== Shuffle! Memories ===
All themes are performed by the voice actresses for the specific character that the episodes focus on. For information on the music see List of Shuffle! albums.

Opening themes

1. "Fateful Encounters" by YURIA
2. "Memories" by Yuko Goto
3. "High Tension Dreamer" by Itou Miki
4. "Pray" by Nagami Haruka
5. "Girigiri Heart Connection" by Aoki Sayaka
6. "Pureness" by Hitomi

Ending themes

1. "Innocence" by Miyuki Hashimoto
2. "Only one, only love" by Yuko Goto
3. "Wish" by Itou Miki
4. "Himitsu no Mori" by Haruka Nagami
5. "Freedom" by Aoki Sayaka
6. "Magical ☆ Powerstation" by Hitomi
7. "Natural Tone" by Miyuki Hashimoto
