= Siena FC =

Association football club in Italy

Siena
- Full name: Siena Football Club; S.S.D. SpA
- Nicknames: I Bianconeri (The White-Blacks); The Robur (The Strength)
- Founded: 1904; 122 years ago as Robur; 2014; 12 years ago as AC Siena; 2020; 6 years ago as Siena 1904; 2023; 3 years ago as Siena FC; 2026; 0 years ago as AC Siena
- Stadium: Stadio Artemio Franchi
- Capacity: 15,373
- President: Jonas Bodin
- Head coach: Gill Voria
- League: Serie D Group E
- 2025–26: Serie D, Group E 4th of 18
- Website: www.sienafootball.com
Home colours	Away colours	Third colours

Siena Football Club, commonly referred to as Siena, is an Italian football club based in Siena, Tuscany. The club was re-incorporated in 2023 after the bankruptcy of the previous legal entity Robur Siena, which itself was the reincarnation of the original club Associazione Calcio Siena. Siena's predecessor was founded in 1904.

Siena plays its home games at the Stadio Artemio Franchi. The stadium's capacity is 15,373 and is located in the centre of Siena.

== History ==
Formed in 1904 as Società Studio e Divertimento (Society for Study and Entertainment), as a sports club characterised by a black and white striped jersey which was derived from the city of Siena coat of arms. It founded its football club, named Società Sportiva Robur in 1908. Today, the name "Robur" is widely used by the local supporters to distinguish itself from the two basketball teams, "Mens Sana" and "Virtus".

The team finally became known as Associazione Calcio Siena (A.C. Siena) in 1933–34. In 1934–35, Siena were promoted for the first time to Serie B. In the post-war 1945–46 season, Siena played in the top division of Italian football for the first time. During that season, a mixed wartime league was composed of both Serie A and Serie B teams. Some of the southern sides that took part in the top division, including Siena, were Serie B teams, while northern Serie B teams played at the second level with the Serie C teams. Therefore, although Siena played in the top division, it was not considered as having officially played in Serie A during that season and not having qualified for the National Round. Siena won the fourth tier league championship in 1955–56 as the Scudetto IV Serie.

After having spent 55 years playing in several lower divisions, Siena were promoted back to Serie B for the start of the 2000–01 season. Following a good first up season in Serie B, the following season saw Siena in serious trouble and coach Giuseppe Papadopulo was sacked, although he would later be recalled and was able to save the club from relegation on the season's final matchday.

The following season, again with Papadopulo as head coach, Siena were promoted to Serie A for the first time officially, led by players such as Rodrigo Taddei and Pinga. Their return marked 58 years since their last appearance in the top division of Italian football.

In the 2003–04 campaign, the first Serie A season in the club's history, Siena finished in a respectable 13th place.

In the 2004–05 Serie A campaign, with Luigi De Canio as head coach, Siena struggled for long periods of the season, languishing in the relegation zone for a great part of the campaign, and with the team drawing far too many games and barely recording any wins, they looked almost certain to be relegated. However, a resurgence of form towards of the end of the season gave them hope, and a 2–1 win against already relegated Atalanta on the last day saw them secure safety and an acceptable 14th place in the table.

The 2005–06 season also saw Siena fighting hard and it successfully kept its place in Serie A. They ended the season in 17th place. For the 2006–07 season, Mario Beretta, who led Parma during the previous season, was appointed as new head coach. He kept Siena in Serie A after a 2–1 home win against Lazio in the final matchday.

During the 2006–07 season, club chairman Paolo De Luca, who took over in 2001 and helped the club to their first historical Serie A promotion, started talks to sell the club to a conglomerate of Tuscan businessmen led by Giovanni Lombardi Stronati, chairman of Valle del Giovenco. The bid was finalised on 30 March 2007, one day before De Luca died after a long illness.

The head coach for the 2007–08 campaign was expected to be Andrea Mandorlini, but he left the club by mutual consent on 12 November. Former coach Mario Beretta once again took charge.

The club also explored the possibility of changing its denomination to include the name of their main sponsor, Banca Monte dei Paschi di Siena. On 9 July 2007, the club announced it had changed their denomination to "A.C. Siena Montepaschi". However, the name change needed to be accepted by the Italian Football Federation (FIGC) to become official: After the refusal by FIGC, this idea was abandoned.

The club was then acquired by Massimo Mezzaroma, with Valentina Mezzaroma as vice-chairman. On 7 May 2011, Siena were once again promoted to Serie A after finishing second in the 2010–11 Serie B. The club's stint into the top flight lasted two seasons, as they were relegated after ending the 2012–13 Serie A in 19th place.

Siena failed to register for 2014–15 Serie B on 15 July 2014, later announcing their bankruptcy. Former A.C. Siena chairman Massimo Mezzaroma was also sued by the prosecutor for false accounting in player swap (Rossi–Galuppo) Eventually the club and Mezzaroma were inadmissible from the charge due to expiry of the legal proceeding. Nevertheless, Guardia di Finanza seized €8.5 million from Mezzaroma for charges related to the bankruptcy.

Robur Siena logo (2014–2020)

In July 2014, thanks to the article 52 of N.O.I.F., the club was refounded under new legal person società sportiva dilettantistica Robur Siena, restarting from 2014–15 Serie D. It was promoted to 2015–16 Lega Pro as champions of Group E in June 2015.

In the 2015–16 season, Robur won the regional derby against Pisa at the Garibaldi Arena after 57 years and qualified for semifinal of Coppa Italia Lega Pro against Foggia, winning the first leg at home, 5–2.

Due to the non-admission of Avellino, Bari and Cesena, Siena became one of the repechage candidates to 2018–19 Serie B on 1 August 2018. Siena finished as the runner-up in the 2017–18 Serie C promotion playoffs, as well as runner-up in the group stage, losing to Cosenza and Livorno respectively. However, after lengthy legal battles, Serie B decided to leave the 3 spots vacated.

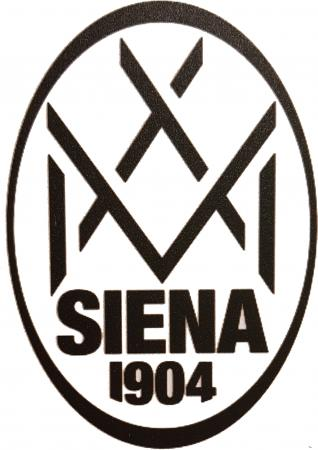
ACN logo

Siena failed to register to Serie C after the end of the 2019–20 season, and the club was successively refounded as ACN Siena 1904 under the ownership of an Armenian group owning Armenian Premier League football club FC Noah. The club was then readmitted to Serie C in 2021 to fill a vacancy, and then sold to Italian group Global Service in June 2022. The club was subsequently renamed to Associazione Calcio Robur Siena 1904. By the end of the 2022–23 season, Siena was excluded from professional football for the third time in less than a decade due to outstanding debts. The Mayor of Siena subsequently handed the sports title to Atlas Consulting srl, former owners of Triestina, who will lead the new club in the Eccellenza league.

== Kit ==
The team's home colours are black and white, derived from the coat of arms of Siena. The achromatic colors are visible in vertical stripes. The 2025/2026 away shirt consists of alternating yellow and white vertical stripes, similarly to the home kit. Before the 2025/2026 however, the away kit has primarily had a mint green color, often with a white stripe down the middle. Since 2025, the brand of the kit is Adidas.

== Anthem ==
The official anthem is Franco Baldi's Su Forza Siena. Other historic city anthems such as the Canto della Verbena and the Marcia del Palio are often sung by local fans during the matches.

== Players ==
=== First team squad ===
As of 17 November 2026

Note: Flags indicate national team as defined under FIFA eligibility rules; some limited exceptions apply. Players may hold more than one non-FIFA nationality.

No.	Pos.	Nation	Player
1	GK	ARG	Santino Perrone
2	MF	ITA	Giorgio Neri
3	DF	ITA	Federico Guglielmino (on loan from Empoli)
4	MF	ITA	Gianni Barbera
5	MF	ITA	Simone Rossi
6	DF	ITA	Daniele Cavallari
7	MF	ITA	Valerio Loconte
8	FW	ITA	Mirco Lipari
9	FW	ITA	Simone Rossetti
10	MF	ITA	Niccolò Nardi
11	MF	ITA	Jacopo Ciofi
12	GK	ITA	Giovanni Palazzi
13	DF	SWE	Marcus Danielson
14	DF	ITA	Enrico Zanoni

No.	Pos.	Nation	Player
16	DF	ITA	Michele Somma (captain)
17	MF	ITA	David Robert Periccioli
20	MF	ITA	Gabriele Giardinelli
21	DF	ITA	Jacopo Cecconi
22	GK	ITA	Mattia Michielan
23	MF	ITA	Alessandro Mastalli
27	DF	ITA	Andrea Conti
32	DF	ITA	Filippo Monteverde
33	MF	ITA	Piergiorgio Sabelli
37	MF	GHA	Moses Odjer
45	MF	ITA	Edoardo Tittocchia
49	DF	ITA	Mattia Parente
90	FW	ITA	Tommaso Andolfi
92	GK	ITA	Mattia Valentini

=== Out on loan ===
Note: Flags indicate national team as defined under FIFA eligibility rules; some limited exceptions apply. Players may hold more than one non-FIFA nationality.

No.	Pos.	Nation	Player

== Management ==
=== Management and coaching staff ===
Position	Name	Nationality
Head coach	Alberto Gilardino	Italy
Fitness coach	Sandro Bencardino	Italy
Technical assistant	Lorenzo Spina	Italy
Goalkeeping coach	Giorgio Rocca	Italy
Technical assistant	Alessandro Signorini	Italy
Technical assistant	Riccardo Tappa Brocci	Italy
Team manager	Ivan Sarra	Italy

== Honours ==
- Serie B
  - Winners: 2002–03
- Serie C1
  - Winners: 1937–38, 1999–00
- Serie C2
  - Winners: 1981–82, 1984–85, 1989–90
- Scudetto IV Serie/Serie D:
  - Winners: 1955–56, 2014–15
- Supercoppa di Serie C
  - Winners: 2000

== Managers ==
- Vittorio Faroppa– 1936–39
- Oronzo Pugliese– 1959–61
- Lauro Toneatto– 1964–66
- Ettore Mannucci– 1977–78
- Ottavio Bianchi– 1978–79
- Ferruccio Mazzola– 1983–86
- Marcello Lippi– 1986–87
- Adriano Lombardi– 1987–88
- Ferruccio Mazzola– 1988–89
- Vincenzo Guerini– Nov 2001 – Feb 2002
- Giuseppe Papadopulo– 2001 – Dec 2004
- Luigi Simoni– Jun 2004 – Jan 2004
- Luigi De Canio– Nov 2004 – Jun 2006
- Mario Beretta– Jul 2006 – Jun 2007
- Andrea Mandorlini– Jul 2007 – Nov 2007
- Mario Beretta– Nov 2007 – Jun 2008
- Marco Giampaolo– Jul 2008 – Oct 2009
- Marco Baroni– Oct 2009 – Nov 2009
- Alberto Malesani– Nov 2009 – May 2010
- Antonio Conte– May 2010 – May 2011
- Giuseppe Sannino– Jun 2011 – Jun 2012
- Serse Cosmi– Jun 2012 – Dec 2012
- Giuseppe Iachini– Dec 2012–13
- Mario Beretta– 2013– Jun 2014
- Massimo Morgia– Jul 2014 – Jul 2015
- Gianluca Atzori– Jul 2015 – Dec 2015
- Guido Carboni– Dec 2015 – Jun 2016
- Giovanni Colella– Jul 2016 – Dec 2016
- Cristiano Scazzola– Dec 2016 – Jun 2017
- Michele Mignani– Jun 2017 – May 2019
- Alessandro Dal Canto– Jul 2019 – Aug 2020
- Alberto Gilardino– Sep 2020 – Jan 2021
- Marians Pahars– Jan 2021 – Feb 2021
- Alberto Gilardino– Feb 2021 – Oct 2021
- Massimiliano Maddaloni– Oct 2021 – Dec 2021
- Pasquale Padalino– Dec 2021 – Jun 2022
- Guido Pagliuca– Jun 2022 – Jun 2023
- Lamberto Magrini– Aug 2023 – Apr 2025
- Gill Voria– Apr 2025 – present
