= List of Shuffle! albums =

This is a list of the albums released in relation to the visual novel Shuffle! and its adaptations.

== Shuffle! visual novel ==
=== Original soundtrack ===
Shuffle! Original Soundtrack

Soundtrack album by Yuria
- Released: 2004-02-25
- Genre: Video game soundtrack
- Label: Lantis

Catalog number LACA-9035.

Disc 1

#	English Title	Japanese Title	Time
1.	"Mirage Lullaby (Half size)"	「Mirage Lullaby (Half size)」	2:22
2.	"Happy Run"	「HAPPY RUN」	2:39
3.	"Afternoon Tea Party"	「Afternoon Tea Party」	2:17
4.	"Ame Agari no Asa"	「雨上がりの朝に」	2:34
5.	"Step Dance"	「STEP DANCE」	2:22
6.	"Twin Fairy"	「Twin Fairy」	2:49
7.	"Aa, Itoshiki Musume-tachi yo"	「ああ、愛しき娘達よ」	2:52
8.	"Morning Bell"	「Morning Bell」	2:52
9.	"Komorebi no Machi"	「木漏れ日の街」	3:09
10.	"Sunlight Summer"	「Sunlight Summer」	2:52
11.	"Hey You!"	「HEY YOU!」	2:47
12.	"Akane Iro ni Itakarete"	「茜色に抱かれて」	2:52
13.	"Kocchi Kara Acchi. Acchi Kara Kocchi."	「こっちからあっち あっちからこっち」	3:32
14.	"Notice!"	「Notice!」	3:04
15.	"Don't be afraid."	「Don't be afraid.」	3:31
16.	"Purple Moon"	「Purple Moon」	2:40
17.	"Kage Fumi"	「影ふみ」	3:50
18.	"Nijimu Kyōzō"	「滲む鏡像」	3:07
19.	"With You..."	「With You...」	3:05
20.	"In the Dream"	「In the Dream」	4:10
21.	"Himawari"	「HIMAWARI」	2:52
22.	"In the Sky (Half size)"	「In the Sky (Half size)」	3:49
23.	"Scramble! (Half size)"	「SCRAMBLE! (Half size)」	3:12

Disc 2

#	English Title	Japanese Title	Time
1.	"Mirage Lullaby (Full size)"	「Mirage Lullaby (Full size)」	5:56
2.	"In the Sky (Full size)"	「In the Sky (Full size)」	5:34
3.	"SCRAMBLE! (Full size)"	「SCRAMBLE! (Full size)」	4:26
4.	"Mirage Lullaby — Blasterhead's WRTRHC mix"	「Mirage Lullaby – Blasterhead's WRTRHC mix」	5:07
5.	"Mirage Lullaby – am0:00 mix"	「Mirage Lullaby – am0:00 mix」	5:13
6.	"Mirage Lullaby – Denki Newtype mix"	「Mirage Lullaby – Denki Newtype mix」	4:36
7.	"Mirage Lullaby – Ho's Techno mix"	「Mirage Lullaby – Ho's Techno mix」	6:07
8.	"Mirage Lullaby – sleepy mix"	「Mirage Lullaby – sleepy mix」	4:37

=== Perfect Arrange Album ===
Shuffle! Perfect Arrange Album

Soundtrack album
- Released: 2005-01-26
- Genre: Video game soundtrack

Catalog number BJCA-0002.

#	English Title	Japanese Title	Time
1.	"Mirage Lullaby (off vocal)"	「Mirage Lullaby (インストバージョン)」	2:57
2.	"Happy Run"	「HAPPY RUN」	6:19
3.	"Twin Fairy"	「Twin Fairy」	3:12
4.	"Morning Bell"	「Morning Bell」	4:20
5.	"Komorebi no Machi"	「木漏れ日の街」	2:31
6.	"Akane Iro ni Itakarete"	「茜色に抱かれて」	3:24
7.	"Purple Moon"	「Purple Moon」	3:58
8.	"Kage Fumi"	「影ふみ」	4:20
9.	"Nijimu Kyōzō"	「滲む鏡像」	4:09
10.	"With You"	「With You」	3:18
11.	"In the Dream"	「In the Dream」	5:45
12.	"In the Sky"	「In the Sky」	5:17
13.	"Mirage Lullaby (vocal ver.)"	「Mirage Lullaby (ボーカルバージョン)」	6:40

8 cm bonus CD

#	English Title	Japanese Title	Time
1.	"In the Sky (vocal arrange ver.)"	「In the Sky (ボーカルアレンジ曲)」	5:17
2.	"HIMAWARI (off vocal)"	「HIMAWARI (インスト曲)」	2:32

=== Drama Series ===
==== FILE.01: Lisianthus ====
Drama Series FILE.01: Lisianthus

Studio album by Aoki Sayaka; Acchorike et al.
- Released: 2004-05-26
- Genre: Audio drama
- Length: 29:32
- Label: Lantis

Catalog number LACA-5282.

#	English Title	Japanese Title	Time
1.	"Girigiri Heart Connection (Drama size)"	「ぎりぎりHeartコネクション (Drama size)」	1:54
2.	"Yuugure no Petit Date"	「夕暮れのプチデート」	5:37
3.	"Natsumatsuri, maigo no maigo wa daare?"	「夏祭り、迷子の迷子はだぁれ?」	12:42
4.	"Mouhitori no watashi, mienai watashi"	「もうひとりのわたし、見えないわたし」	9:19

==== FILE.02: Nerine ====
Drama Series FILE.02: Nerine

Studio album by Haruka Nagami; Acchorike et al.
- Released: 2004-06-23
- Genre: Audio drama
- Length: 25:49
- Label: Lantis

Catalog number LACA-5291.

#	English Title	Japanese Title	Time
1.	"Himitsu no mori (Drama size)"	「秘密の森 (Drama size)」	2:04
2.	"Sabishii natsuyasumi..."	「寂しい夏休み...」	7:47
3.	"Minna de obenkyou shimashou"	「みんなでお勉強しましょう」	7:25
4.	"Modorenai ichinichi"	「戻れない一日」	8:33

==== FILE.03: Fuyou Kaede ====
Drama Series FILE.03: Fuyou Kaede

Studio album by Yūko Gotō; Acchorike et al.
- Released: 2004-07-22
- Genre: Audio drama
- Length: 28:01
- Label: Lantis

Catalog number LACA-5296.

#	English Title	Japanese Title	Time
1.	"Only One, Only Love (Drama size)"	「only one, only love (Drama size)」	2:44
2.	"Totsuzen no Breakdown"	「突然のBreakDown」	6:35
3.	"Tomodachi wa ofuroya-san"	「友達はお風呂屋さん」	6:28
4.	"Omoi dasenai kako"	「思い出せない過去」	12:14

==== FILE.04: Shigure Asa ====
Drama Series FILE.04: Shigure Asa

Studio album by Miki Itou; Acchorike et al.
- Released: 2004-08-25
- Genre: Audio drama
- Length: 24:08
- Label: Lantis

Catalog number LACA-5308.

#	English Title	Japanese Title	Time
1.	"High Tension Dreamer (Drama size)"	「High Tension Dreamer (Drama size)」	2:14
2.	"Tomodachi ijou koibito miman... Demo..."	「友達以上恋人未満...でも...」	6:47
3.	"Rival wa Princess"	「ライバルはプリンセス」	7:46
4.	"Koi no kanransha"	「恋の観覧車」	7:21

==== FILE.05: Primula ====
Drama Series FILE.05: Primula

Studio album by hitomi; Acchorike et al.
- Released: 2004-09-23
- Genre: Audio drama
- Length: 31:33
- Label: Lantis

Catalog number LACA-5314.

#	English Title	Japanese Title	Time
1.	"Magical Power Station (Drama size)"	「まじかる☆パワーステーション (Drama size)」	2:06
2.	"Gakkou gaeri no machiawase"	「学校帰りの待ち合わせ」	3:21
3.	"Bunkasai wa Scramble"	「文化祭はスクランブル」	8:27
4.	"Kyousitsu no korinai hitobito"	「教室の懲りない人々」	7:46
5.	"Taisetsuna nakushimono"	「大切な失くしもの」	9:53

=== Shuffle! Time Character Vocal Image Album ===
Shuffle! Time Character Vocal Image Album

Soundtrack album
- Released: 2004-10-27
- Genre: Video game soundtrack
- Length: 48:14
- Label: Lantis

Catalog number LACA-5325.

#	English Title	Japanese Title	Time
1.	"Girigiri Heart Connection"	「ぎりぎりHeartコネクション」	4:37
2.	"High Tension Dreamer"	「High Tension Dreamer」	4:19
3.	"Happy Sunny Weekend"	「Happy Sunny Weekend」	4:51
4.	"Ambivalence"	「Ambivalence」	4:20
5.	"Dynamite Days"	「Dynamite Days」	3:30
6.	"Unlimited World"	「Unlimited World」	4:15
7.	"Only One, Only Love"	「only one, only love」	4:31
8.	"Himitsu no mori"	「秘密の森」	4:46
9.	"Wing"	「wing」	3:31
10.	"Magical Power Station"	「まじかる☆パワーステーション」	3:51
11.	"Everlasting"	「everlasting」	5:21

=== Rainbow Remix ===
Shuffle! Rainbow Remix

Remix album
- Released: 2005-06-22
- Genre: Video game soundtrack
- Length: 66:31
- Label: Lantis

Catalog number LACA-5399.

#	English Title	Japanese Title	Time
1.	"Mirage Lullaby -Dominator Mix-"	「Mirage Lullaby -Dominator MIX-」	6:48
2.	"Mirage Lullaby -Surface Mix-"	「Mirage Lullaby -Surface mix-」	4:34
3.	"Mirage Lullaby -Pumpin' Trance Mix-"	「Mirage Lullaby -Pumpin' Trance Mix-」	6:53
4.	"Mirage Lullaby -Infinity Mirage Hard Dress Style-"	「Mirage Lullaby -Infinity Mirage HARD dRESS STYLE」	6:43
5.	"Mirage Lullaby -Remix R&B-"	「Mirage Lullaby -re-mixR&B」	4:38
6.	"Mirage Lullaby -Denki's Psycho Frame Mix-"	「Mirage Lullaby -Denki's Psycho frame mix-」	5:03
7.	"Mirage Lullaby -Nightmare Short Mix-"	「Mirage Lullaby -nightmare...ShortMIX-」	5:38
8.	"Mirage Lullaby -France-Jin Katachi Kuru Kuru-"	「Mirage Lullaby -フランス人形くるくる-」	6:04
9.	"Mirage Lullaby -SRmix-"	「Mirage Lullaby -SRmix-」	6:17
10.	"Mirage Lullaby -2Pack Mix-"	「Mirage Lullaby -2PACK MIX-」	7:55
11.	"Mirage Lullaby -Vocal Trance Mix-"	「Mirage Lullaby -vocal trance mix-」	5:40

== Shuffle! On the Stage visual novel ==
=== ORIGINAL! ===
A Maxi single for the opening theme to the Shuffle! On the Stage visual novel. Catalog number LACM-4232.

#	English Title	Japanese Title	Time
1.	"Original!"	「ORIGINAL!」	3:52
2.	"Mermaid Blue"	「mermaid blue 」	4:05
3.	"Original! (off vocal)"	「ORIGINAL! (off vocal)」	3:52
4.	"Mermaid Blue (off vocal)"	「mermaid blue (off vocal)」	4:03

"ORIGINAL!"

Single by Yuria
- Released: 2005-11-23
- Genre: Anime soundtrack
- Length: 15:52
- Label: Lantis

=== Re-Mix Album COMPOSITION ELEVEN ===
Re-Mix Album COMPOSITION ELEVEN

Remix album
- Released: 2005-12-21
- Length: 54:09
- Label: Lantis

Catalog number LACA-5456.

#	English Title	Japanese Title	Time
1.		「ORIGINAL! Hardcore/Acid mix」	4:36
2.		「ORIGINAL! Lookin' for dream mix」	5:34
3.		「ORIGINAL! Shuffle! A lounge Electronica Mix」	4:06
4.		「ORIGINAL! Girl Pop Mix – Remixed」	3:36
5.		「ORIGINAL! kェサツ REMIX」	6:56
6.		「ORIGINAL! Discode Lovers -Hard dRESS Style-」	4:55
7.		「ORIGINAL! pumpin' mix」	5:35
8.		「ORIGINAL! PANIC BASS MIX」	3:53
9.		「ORIGINAL! Denki's Heaven's GATE mix」	5:33
10.		「ORIGINAL! Surface mix」	4:14
11.		「ORIGINAL! progressive nightmare」	5:07

=== Character Vocal Album ===
Shuffle! On the Stage Character Vocal Album

Soundtrack album
- Released: 2006-03-24
- Length: 54:01
- Label: Lantis

Catalog number LACA-5497.

#	English Title	Japanese Title	Time
1.		「Smiley Shiney Day」	5:07
2.		「君とユメイロ☆ happiness!」	4:10
3.		「世界に!HOP☆STEP☆タイム!?」	3:47
4.		「Love bless You!」	4:10
5.		「Get the world!」	4:18
6.		「ホントの奇跡」	3:00
7.		「メッセージ」	5:12
8.		「この胸に」	4:08
9.		「男道」	4:09
10.		「メリーゴーランド」	4:11
11.		「イマジネーション」	4:17
12.		「すべては棘ある薔薇色」	3:25
13.		「守ってあ・げ・る!」	4:16

=== Drama vol.1: Mayumi Thyme ===
Shuffle! On the Stage CD Drama vol.1: Mayumi Thyme

Studio album by Miki Inoue
- Released: 2006-02-22
- Genre: Audio drama
- Length: 49:31
- Label: Lantis

Catalog number LACA-5485.

#	English Title	Japanese Title	Time
1.		「タイトルコール」	0:21
2.		「相変わらずの俺達」	3:42
3.		「王女達の苦悩」	3:13
4.		「恐怖学園新聞」	0:56
5.		「死刑宣告」	3:37
6.		「物憂げな屋上」	1:06
7.		「俺達をスキーに連れてって」	3:45
8.		「魅惑の施設」	1:39
9.		「ゲレンデは大騒ぎ」	3:55
10.		「不揃いのシュプール」	3:04
11.		「女3人寄れば...」	1:33
12.		「裸の付き合い!?」	2:45
13.		「思いあふれて」	8:29
14.		「微笑みの記事訂正」	1:51
15.		「キャストメッセージ」	9:35

=== Drama vol.2: Kareha ===
Shuffle! On the Stage CD Drama vol.2: Kareha

Studio album by Yura Hinata
- Released: 2006-05-24
- Genre: Audio drama
- Length: 56:58
- Label: Lantis

Catalog number LACA-5519.

#	English Title	Japanese Title	Time
1.		「オープニング～夢見る乙女～」	2:59
2.		「タイトルコール」	0:17
3.		「バレンタインはどう過ごす？」	3:15
4.		「親友はお人好し」	1:59
5.		「パーティーは大勢で」	5:34
6.		「似たもの姉妹」	1:31
7.		「学園は戦場だ!」	1:25
8.		「渡してきます!」	2:34
9.		「次こそは!」	1:16
10.		「結局...」	2:43
11.		「そしてパーティーが始まる」	1:10
12.		「主賓のいないパーティー」	5:21
13.		「アクシデントは突然に 」	4:40
14.		「逢いたくて」	8:03
15.		「エンディング～2人の未来～」	5:44
16.		「キャストメッセージ」	8:27

== Shuffle! Essence+ visual novel ==
=== Link-age ===
"Link-age"

Single by Yuria
- Released: 2009-11-25
- Genre: Anime soundtrack
- Label: Lantis

A Maxi single for the opening theme to the Shuffle! Essence+ visual novel. Catalog number LACM-4682.

#	English Title	Japanese Title	Time
1.	"Link-age"	「Link-age」	4:49
2.	"Garnet"	「Garnet」	4:32
3.	"Link-age (off vocal)"	「Link-age (off vocal)」	4:49
4.	"Garnet (off vocal)"	「Garnet (off vocal)」	4:32

== Shuffle! anime ==
=== YOU ===
"YOU"

Single by Yuria
- Released: 2005-08-03
- Genre: Anime soundtrack
- Length: 17:09
- Label: Lantis

A Maxi single for the opening theme to the Shuffle! anime. Catalog number LACM-4207.

#	English Title	Japanese Title	Time
1.	"You"	「YOU」	3:54
2.	"Colorful"	「カラフル」	4:41
3.	"You (off vocal)"	「YOU (off vocal)」	3:54
4.	"Colorful (off vocal)"	「カラフル (off vocal)」	4:39

=== innocence ===
"innocence"

Single by Miyuki Hashimoto
- Released: 2005-08-24
- Genre: Anime soundtrack
- Length: 18:20
- Label: Lantis

A Maxi single for the ending theme to the Shuffle! anime. Catalog number LACM-4213.

#	English Title	Japanese Title	Time
1.	"Innocence"	「innocence」	4:48
2.	"Time Has Come"	「Time has come」	4:23
3.	"Innocence (off vocal)"	「innocence (off vocal)」	4:48
4.	"Time Has Come (off vocal)"	「Time has come (off vocal)」	4:22

=== Character Vocal and Soundtrack CDs ===
==== #1: Lisianthus ====
Character Vocal and Soundtrack CD #1: Lisianthus

Soundtrack album by Sayaka Aoki; Minoru Maruo; Acchorike
- Released: 2005-10-28
- Genre: Anime soundtrack

Comes packaged with the limited edition versions of the first Shuffle! anime DVD.

#	English Title	Japanese Title	Time
1.	"Freedom"	「Freedom」	4:23
2.	"Deai no Omoide"	「出会いの思い出」	1:39
3.	"Troubling Picture"	「troubling picture」	1:35
4.	"Schlemiel"	「schlemiel」	1:33
5.	"In a Positive Frame of Mind"	「in a positive frame of mind」	2:06
6.	"Tremulous with Heartthrobs"	「tremulous with heartthrobs」	1:47
7.	"Message from Lisianthus"	「メッセージ フロム リシアンサス」	2:12

==== #2: Nerine ====
Character Vocal and Soundtrack CD #2: Nerine

Soundtrack album by Haruka Nagami; Minoru Maruo; Acchorike
- Released: 2005-11-25
- Genre: Anime soundtrack

Comes packaged with the limited edition versions of the second Shuffle! anime DVD.

#	English Title	Japanese Title	Time
1.	"Pray"	「pray」	4:40
2.	"Yume to Sora ga Kanaderu Merodi"	「夢と空が奏でるメロディ」	1:17
3.	"Osanai Hi no Kimochi"	「幼い日の気持ち」	1:50
4.	"Aoi Sora no Shita de"	「青い空の下で」	1:48
5.	"Intention"	「intention」	1:39
6.	"Witchcraft"	「witchcraft」	1:38
7.	"Mirai e no Tabadachi"	「未来への旅立ち」	2:02
8.	"Tsutaetai Omoi"	「伝えたい思い」	1:38
9.	"Message from Nerine"	「メッセージ フロム ネリネ」	3:44

==== #3: Kaede ====
Character Vocal and Soundtrack CD #3: Kaede

Soundtrack album by Yūko Gotō; Minoru Maruo; Acchorike
- Released: 2005-12-23
- Genre: Anime soundtrack

Comes packaged with the limited edition versions of the third Shuffle! anime DVD.

#	English Title	Japanese Title	Time
1.	"Memories"	「memories」	3:46
2.	"Atarashii Asa"	「新しい朝」	1:37
3.	"A Fresh New Day"	「a fresh new day」	1:38
4.	"Itsumo Hitori"	「いつも一人」	1:30
5.	"Vague Sense of Fear"	「vague sense of fear」	1:44
6.	"Futari Kiri....."	「2人きり‥‥。」	1:45
7.	"Michi"	「道」	2:20
8.	"Feel Down"	「feel down」	1:27
9.	"Cherished Memory"	「cherished memory」	1:56
10.	"Message from Kaede"	「メッセージ フロム 楓」	3:08

==== #4: Asa ====
Character Vocal and Soundtrack CD #4: Asa

Soundtrack album by Miki Itou; Minoru Maruo; Acchorike
- Released: 2006-01-27
- Genre: Anime soundtrack

Comes packaged with the limited edition versions of the fourth Shuffle! anime DVD.

#	English Title	Japanese Title	Time
1.	"Wish"	「wish」	3:58
2.	"Sweet Memories"	「sweet memories」	1:58
3.	"Power Full Kibun"	「パワフル気分」	1:24
4.	"Clear Heart"	「clear heart」	2:04
5.	"Yami Kara no Shisha"	「闇からの使者」	1:44
6.	"Kanashimino Machi"	「kanashimino machi」	1:26
7.	"Doki Doki Heart"	「ドキドキハート」	1:44
8.	"Kimi to Futari de"	「キミと二人で」	1:45
9.	"Message from Asa"	「メッセージ フロム 亜沙」	4:19

==== #5: Primula ====
Character Vocal and Soundtrack CD #5: Primula

Soundtrack album by hitomi; Minoru Maruo; Acchorike
- Released: 2006-02-24
- Genre: Anime soundtrack

Comes packaged with the limited edition versions of the fifth Shuffle! anime DVD.

#	English Title	Japanese Title	Time
1.	"Pureness"	「pureness」	5:27
2.	"Mystery"	「mystery」	1:49
3.	"Kimi wo Omou Merodii"	「キミを想うメロディー」	1:42
4.	"Shizukanaru Doki"	「静かなる時」	1:29
5.	"Final Countdown"	「FINAL COUNTDOWN」	1:30
6.	"Diary"	「diary」	1:43
7.	"Message from Primula"	「メッセージ フロム プリムラ」	2:51

==== #6: Mayumi Thyme ====
Character Vocal and Soundtrack CD #6: Mayumi Thyme

Soundtrack album by Miki Inoue; Acchorike; Kazuhiko Sawaguchi; Minoru Maruo
- Released: 2006-03-24
- Genre: Anime soundtrack

Comes packaged with the limited edition versions of the sixth Shuffle! anime DVD.

#	English Title	Japanese Title	Time
1.	"Wonderful Community"	「wonderful community」	3:52
2.	"Happy Days"	「Happy Days」	1:42
3.	"Hero"	「Hero」	1:44
4.	"Electric Square"	「electric square」	1:37
5.	"Message from Mayumi Thyme"	「メッセージ フロム 麻弓=タイム」	2:48

==== #7: Kareha ====
Character Vocal and Soundtrack CD #7: Kareha

Soundtrack album by Yura Hinata; Acchorike; Kazuhiko Sawaguchi; Minoru Maruo
- Released: 2006-04-28
- Genre: Anime soundtrack

Comes packaged with the limited edition versions of the seventh Shuffle! anime DVD.

#	English Title	Japanese Title	Time
1.	"Stars"	「stars」	4:18
2.	"Kibun wa Saikou"	「気分は最高」	1:36
3.	"Erabashi Mono"	「選ばし者」	1:31
4.	"Shousou Kuukan"	「焦燥空間」	1:25
5.	"Sunset"	「sunset」	1:56
6.	"Message from Kareha"	「メッセージ フロム カレハ」	3:17

==== #8: Ama ====
Character Vocal and Soundtrack CD #8: Ama

Soundtrack album by YURIA; Acchorike; Minoru Maruo; Kazuhiko Sawaguchi
- Released: 2006-05-26
- Genre: Anime soundtrack

Comes packaged with the limited edition versions of the eighth Shuffle! anime DVD.

#	English Title	Japanese Title	Time
1.	"Treasure"	「treasure」	4:26
2.	"Friends"	「friends」	1:42
3.	"Time Attack"	「time attack」	1:45
4.	"Labyrinth"	「labyrinth」	1:33
5.	"Message from Ama"	「メッセージ フロム 亜麻」	2:22

==== #9: Lycoris ====
Character Vocal and Soundtrack CD #9: Lycoris

Soundtrack album by Nagami Haruka; Acchorike
- Released: 2006-06-23
- Genre: Anime soundtrack
- Length: 12:46

Comes packaged with the limited edition versions of the ninth Shuffle! anime DVD.

#	English Title	Japanese Title	Time
1.	"Missing You"	「missing you」	3:34
2.	"Korekare no story"	「これからのstory」	1:34
3.	"Danger"	「DANGER」	1:24
4.	"Kimi ga Satta"	「キミが去った...」	1:38
5.	"Ketsui"	「決意」	1:31
6.	"Message from Lycoris"	「メッセージ フロム リコリス」	3:05

==== #10: Kikyou ====
Character Vocal and Soundtrack CD #10: Kikyou

Soundtrack album by Aoki Sayaka; Acchorike; Minoru Maruo
- Released: 2006-07-28
- Genre: Anime soundtrack

Comes packaged with the limited edition versions of the tenth Shuffle! anime DVD.

#	English Title	Japanese Title	Time
1.	"Jump"	「JUMP」	3:55
2.	"Ashita he Jump!"	「明日へJUMP！」	1:23
3.	"Shinsou"	「深層」	1:37
4.	"Oresama Toujou!"	「俺様登場！」	1:28
5.	"Precious Memories"	「Precious Memories」	1:29
6.	"Message from Kikyou"	「メッセージ フロム キキョウ」	2:45

==== #11: Lisianthus & Nerine ====
Character Vocal and Soundtrack CD #11: Lisianthus & Nerine

Soundtrack album by Aoki Sayaka; Haruka Nagami; Acchorike; Kazuhiko Sawaguchi; NACHTMUSIK
- Released: 2006-08-25
- Genre: Anime soundtrack

Comes packaged with the limited edition versions of the eleventh Shuffle! anime DVD.

#	English Title	Japanese Title	Time
1.	"Hitorijanaiyo!"	「一人じゃないよ！」	3:39
2.	"HAN (Otoko) no Uta"	「漢(オトコ)の詩」	1:41
3.	"Kabe no Mukou"	「壁の向こう」	1:28
4.	"Honmono ha Dareda!?"	「本物はだれだ！？」	2:07
5.	"Comical Step"	「COMICAL STEP」	1:36
6.	"Message from Lisianthus & Nerine"	「メッセージ フロム リシアンサス&ネリネ」	2:12

==== #12: Kaede & Asa ====
Character Vocal and Soundtrack CD #12: Kaede & Asa

Soundtrack album by Yūko Gotō; Itou Miki; Minoru Maruo; Kazuhiko Sawaguchi; Acchorike
- Released: 2006-09-29
- Genre: Anime soundtrack

Comes packaged with the limited edition versions of the twelfth Shuffle! anime DVD.

#	English Title	Japanese Title	Time
1.	"Kimi to Mirai wo"	「キミと未来を」	4:23
2.	"Wall"	「WALL」	1:38
3.	"Destiny"	「DESTINY」	1:44
4.	"Crystal Heart"	「crystal heart」	1:34
5.	"Sanpomichi"	「散步道」	1:56
6.	"Arere?"	「あれれ？」	1:29
7.	"Hitorijanai"	「一人じゃない」	1:48
8.	"Cover"	「cover」	2:30
9.	"Kono Tobira no Mukou ni"	「この扉の向こうに」	1:58
10.	"Message from Kaede & Asa"	「メッセーヅ フロム 楓&亞沙」	2:15

== Shuffle! Memories anime ==
=== Original soundtrack ===
Shuffle! Memories Original Soundtrack

Soundtrack album
- Released: 2007-05-23
- Genre: Anime soundtrack
- Length: 76:01
- Label: Lantis

Catalog number LACA-5642.

#	English Title	Japanese Title	Time
1.	"Fateful Encounters (Introduction Chapter Opening)"	「Fateful encounters (導入編オープニング)」	3:48
2.	"A Fresh New Day"	「a fresh new day」	1:37
3.	"Atarashii Asa"	「新しい朝」	1:36
4.	"Hero"	「Hero」	1:29
5.	"Powerful Kibun"	「パワフル気分」	1:23
6.	"Ore-sama Toujou!"	「俺様登場!」	1:27
7.	"Happy Days"	「Happy Days」	1:41
8.	"Gogo no Hizashi wo Abite"	「午後の日差しを浴びて」	1:32
9.	"Vague Sense of Fear"	「vague sense of fear」	1:44
10.	"Kibun wa Saikou!"	「気分は最高!」	1:35
11.	"In a Positive Frame of Mind"	「in a positive frame of mind」	2:08
12.	"Yume to Sora ga Kanaderu Melody"	「夢と空が奏でるメロディ」	1:16
13.	"Otoko no Shi"	「漢(オトコ)の詩」	1:40
14.	"Cherished Memory"	「cherished memory」	1:55
15.	"Happy? Happy!"	「Happy?Happy!」	1:32
16.	"Troubling Picture"	「troubling picture」	1:36
17.	"Eraba Reshi Mono"	「選ばれし者」	1:43
18.	"Deai no Omoide"	「出会いの思い出」	1:41
19.	"Itsumo Hitori"	「いつも一人」	1:25
20.	"Mystery"	「mystery」	1:49
21.	"Sweet Memories"	「sweet memories」	1:58
22.	"Kimi wo Omou Melody"	「キミを思うメロディー」	1:42
23.	"Schlemiel"	「schlemiel」	1:29
24.	"Clear Heart"	「clear heart」	2:04
25.	"Aoi Sora no Shita de"	「青い空の下で」	1:48
26.	"Osanai Hi no Kimochi"	「幼い日の気持ち」	1:50
27.	"Shizuka Naru Toki"	「静かなる時」	1:28
28.	"Tremulous with Heartthrobs"	「tremulous with heartthrobs」	1:49
29.	"Sunset"	「sunset」	1:55
30.	"Kabe no Mukou"	「壁の向こう」	1:27
31.	"Ketsui"	「決意」	1:30
32.	"Shousou Kuukan"	「焦燥空間」	1:24
33.	"Korekara no story"	「これからのstory」	1:33
34.	"Mirai he no Tabidachi"	「未来への旅立ち」	2:02
35.	"Shinsou"	「深層」	1:37
36.	"Doki Doki Heart"	「ドキドキハート」	1:44
37.	"Kimi to Futari de"	「キミと二人で」	1:22
38.	"Hitori ja nai"	「一人じゃない」	1:47
39.	"Sanpomichi"	「散歩道」	1:53
40.	"Kono Tobira no Mukou ni"	「この扉の向こうに」	1:57
41.	"Natural Tone (Ending)"	「natural tone (番外編エンディング)」	4:13
42.	"You ~TV Size~ (Bonus Track)"	「YOU ～TVsize～ (BONUS TRACK)」	1:31
43.	"Innocence ~TV Size~ (Bonus Track)"	「innocence ～TVsize～ (BONUS TRACK)」	1:21

=== Character Song Album ===
Shuffle! Memories Character Song Album

Soundtrack album
- Released: 2007-04-11
- Label: Lantis

Catalog number LACA-5624.

#	English Title	Japanese Title	Time
1.	"Memories"	「memories」	3:46
2.	"Wish"	「wish」	3:59
3.	"Pray"	「pray」	4:39
4.	"Freedom"	「Freedom」	4:23
5.	"Pureness"	「pureness」	5:27
6.	"Wonderful Community"	「wonderful community」	3:51
7.	"Stars"	「stars」	4:17
8.	"Treasure"	「treasure」	4:26
9.	"Missing You"	「missing you」	3:32
10.	"Jump"	「JUMP」	3:55
11.	"Hitori Janai yo"	「一人じゃないよ！」	3:38
12.	"Kimi to Mirai wo"	「キミと未来を」	4:21

=== Original Drama CD 1: Kaede Fuyou ===
Shuffle! Memories Original Drama CD vol.1: Kaede Fuyou

Studio album
- Released: 2007-07-25
- Genre: Audio drama
- Length: 58:44
- Label: Lantis

Catalog number LACA-5632.

#	English Title	Japanese Title	Time
1.	"Memories (TV size)"	「memories (TV size)」	1:29
2.	Prologue	「プロローグ~福引券~」	2:18
3.		「ペアチケット」	8:03
4.		「ペアチケットを当てたのは誰？」	8:29
5.		「稟の思いやり」	5:40
6.		「プリムラが行けない...。」	5:04
7.		「二人旅」	3:48
8.		「紅葉谷温泉」	4:18
9.		「二人だけの時間」	5:04
10.		「庭の露天風呂」	5:37
11.		「二人湯」	4:47
12.	Epilogue	「エピローグ~それはナイショです♪~」	1:23
13.		「only one, only love (TV size)」	2:37

=== Original Drama CD 2: Lisianthus ===
Shuffle! Memories Original Drama CD vol.2: Lisianthus

Studio album
- Released: 2007-10-24
- Genre: Audio drama
- Length: 57:34
- Label: Lantis

Catalog number LACA-5701.

#	English Title	Japanese Title	Time
1.		「ぎりぎりHeartコネクション (TV size)」	1:48
2.	Prologue	「プロローグ~神隠しの山~」	3:34
3.		「神隠しの山」	4:39
4.		「雨宿りのお屋敷...」	5:17
5.		「暖炉に火を入れる」	3:54
6.		「女の子裸祭り♪」	2:35
7.		「奇妙な音...」	7:37
8.		「長すぎる渡り廊下」	6:23
9.		「シア、ここで暮らそう...。」	16:57
10.	Epilogue	「エピローグ~ごめんね~」	3:02
11.		「Freedom (TV size)」	1:49

=== Original Drama CD 3: Nerine ===
Shuffle! Memories Original Drama CD vol.3: Nerine

Studio album
- Released: 2008-01-23
- Genre: Audio drama
- Label: Lantis

Catalog number LACA-5735.

#	English Title	Japanese Title	Time
1.	"Pray (TV size)"	「pray (TV size)」
2.	Prologue
1?.	Epilogue
1?.		「秘密の森 (TV size)」

== Shuffle! Charadio drama series ==
Shuffle! Charadio: Verbena Academy Broadcasting Department (SHUFFLE!キャラジオ バーベナ学園放送部) is a 2005–2006 radio drama series hosted by Sayaka Aoki, as Lisianthus, and Haruka Nagami, as Nerine. The word 'charadio' (ラジオ, kyarajio) is a blend of the words 'character' (キャラクタ, kyarakuta) and 'radio' (ラジオ, rajio), referring to a radio drama while being in-character. While the word blends smoothly in Japanese because of the single pronunciation of the 'a' sound, it gets mangled in English.

=== Charadio vol. 1 ===
Shuffle!: Verbena Academy Broadcasting Department vol. 1

Studio album by Sayaka Aoki and Haruka Nagami
- Released: 2005-10-05
- Genre: Radio drama
- Length: 48:12
- Label: Lantis

Catalog number LACA-5437.

#	English Title	Japanese Title	Time
1.	"Opening Theme: Smile Smile"	「オープニングテーマ Smile Smile」	4:50
2.	"Opening"	「オープニング」	2:36
3.	"Oshiete Sia & Rin! 10-Mon Question!"	「教えてシア&リン!10問クエスチョン!」	7:30
4.	"Sia no One Point Cooking"	「シアのワンポイントクッキング」	2:38
5.	"Guest Corner"	「ゲストコーナー」	10:44
6.	"Kore tte Docchi? God or Devil!"	「これってどっち? GOD or DEVIL!」	4:58
7.	"Nerine no One Point Eikaiwa"	「ネリネのワンポイント英会話」	2:00
8.	"Ending"	「エンディング」	2:09
9.	"Omake: Cast Free Talk"	「おまけ・キャストフリートーク」	10:39

=== Charadio vol. 2 ===
Shuffle!: Verbena Academy Broadcasting Department vol. 2

Studio album by Sayaka Aoki and Haruka Nagami
- Released: 2005-11-02
- Genre: Radio drama
- Length: 49:52
- Label: Lantis

Catalog number LACA-5443.

#	English Title	Japanese Title	Time
1.	"Opening Theme: Smile Smile"	「オープニングテーマ Smile Smile」	4:50
2.	"Opening"	「オープニング」	3:11
3.	"Free Talk"	「フリートーク」	7:39
4.	"Nerine no Shuffle! Hammer Price!"	「ネリネのSHUFFLE!ハンマープライス！」	2:59
5.	"Guest Corner"	「ゲストコーナー」	12:11
6.	"Kore tte Docchi? God or Devil!"	「これってどっち? GOD or DEVIL!」	6:39
7.	"Sia no Shuffle! Hammer Price!"	「シアのSHUFFLE!ハンマープライス!」	1:39
8.	"Ending"	「エンディング」	2:28
9.	"Omake: Cast Free Talk"	「おまけ・キャストフリートーク」	8:10

=== Charadio vol. 3 ===
Shuffle!: Verbena Academy Broadcasting Department vol. 3

Studio album by Sayaka Aoki and Haruka Nagami
- Released: 2005-12-07
- Genre: Radio drama
- Label: Lantis

Catalog number LACA-5447.

#	English Title	Japanese Title	Time
1.	"Opening Theme: Smile Smile"	「オープニングテーマ Smile Smile」	4:52
2.	"Opening"	「オープニング」	6:30
3.	"Primula no Hoshiimono tte?"	「プリムラの欲しいものって？」	10:35
4.	"Ano Chou Yumei Bangumi ni..."	「あの超有名番組に・・・」	5:21
5.	"Toshi no Se no Fuubutsu Toki o Taiken!"	「年の瀬の風物詩を体験！」	7:40
6.	"Ending"	「エンディング」	5:31
7.	"Omake: Cast Free Talk"	「おまけ・キャストフリートーク」	8:19

=== Charadio vol. 4 ===
Shuffle!: Verbena Academy Broadcasting Department vol. 4

Studio album by Sayaka Aoki and Haruka Nagami
- Released: 2006-01-12
- Genre: Radio drama
- Length: 53:51
- Label: Lantis

Catalog number LACA-5459.

#	English Title	Japanese Title	Time
1.	"Opening Theme: Smile Smile"	「オープニングテーマ Smile Smile」	4:51
2.	"Opening ~Shinnen no Goaisatsu~"	「オープニング～新年のご挨拶～」	4:53
3.	"Free Talk ~Otayori Shoukai~"	「フリートーク～お便り紹介～」	7:07
4.	"Sia no Kuishinbou Banzai!"	「シアの食いしん坊バンザイ！」	3:04
5.	"Guest Corner ~Toukou Jashin Taiketsu!!~"	「ゲストコーナー～投稿写真対決！！～」	16:10
6.	"Nerine no Kuishinbou Banzai!"	「ネリネの食いしん坊バンザイ！」	3:51
7.	"Ending"	「エンディング」	3:55
8.	"Omake: Cast Free Talk"	「おまけ・キャストフリートーク」	10:00

=== Charadio vol. 5 ===
Shuffle!: Verbena Academy Broadcasting Department vol. 5

Studio album by Sayaka Aoki and Haruka Nagami
- Released: 2006-02-08
- Genre: Radio drama
- Length: 52:17
- Label: Lantis

Catalog number LACA-5479.

#	English Title	Japanese Title	Time
1.	"Opening Theme: Smile Smile"	「オープニングテーマ Smile Smile」	4:52
2.	"Opening"	「オープニング」	3:15
3.	"Free Talk"	「フリートーク」	6:29
4.		「ネリネ・願掛けにチャレンジ！」	3:14
5.	"Guest Corner"	「ゲストコーナー」	14:37
6.		「シア・熱湯コマーシャルにチャレンジ！」	4:58
7.	"Ending"	「エンディング」	6:03
8.	"Omake: Cast Free Talk"	「おまけ・キャストフリートーク」	8:48

=== Charadio Petit! vol. 1 ===
Shuffle!: Verbena Academy Broadcasting Department Petit! vol. 1

Studio album by Sayaka Aoki and Haruka Nagami
- Released: 2006-04-05
- Genre: Radio drama
- Length: 59:36
- Label: Lantis

Catalog number LACA-5502.

#	English Title	Japanese Title	Time
1.	"Opening"	「オープニング」	2:48
2.	#1 "Jiko-shoukai o Yattemiyou!"	#1 「自己紹介をやってみよう！」	4:30
3.	#2 "Tachiiri Kinshi no Bashou no Ohana wa Tsun ja Dame?"	#2 「立ち入り禁止の場所のお花は摘んじゃダメ？」	5:08
4.	#3 "Sayounara Yoki Hi no Shia-san"	#3 「さようなら よき日のシアさん」	4:04
5.	#4 "Rin-chan Gyoukai Hairi no Maku"	#4 「リンちゃん業界入りの巻？」	5:03
6.	#5 "Hajimette no Kokai Rokuon!"	#5 「はじめての公開録音っ！」	5:05
7.	Break Time	「ブレイクタイム」	4:24
8.	#6 "Dousei o Suki ni Natcha Ikenai no?"	#6 「同性を好きになっちゃいけないの？」	5:16
9.	#7 "Neri Banwa? Shia Nichiwa?"	#7 「ネリばんわ？シアにちわ？」	5:19
10.	#8 "Inago no Tensha o Tsukuru no wa Dame na koto?"	#8 「いなごの佃煮を作るのはダメなこと？」	5:52
11.	#9 "Boku wa Tsuchimi Tin no 2-bai desu"	#9 「僕は土見稟の2倍です」	5:02
12.	#10 "Shia-chan Rin-chan o Stalker Shicha Dame?"	#10 「シアちゃんリンちゃんをストーカーしちゃダメ？」	4:58
13.	"Ending"	「エンディング」	2:08

=== Charadio Petit! vol. 2 ===
Shuffle!: Verbena Academy Broadcasting Department Petit! vol. 2

Studio album by Sayaka Aoki and Haruka Nagami
- Released: 2006-06-07
- Genre: Radio drama
- Length: 63:11
- Label: Lantis

Catalog number LACA-5525.

#	English Title	Japanese Title	Time
1.	"Opening"	「オープニング」	1:42
2.	#11 "Christmas Special!"	#11 「クリスマススペシャルッ！」	4:51
3.	#12 "Shia-chan no Bonnou o Fukitobase!"	#12 「シアちゃんの煩悩を吹き飛ばせ！」	5:50
4.	#13 "Toshi Hajime! Houfu Iiaikko Taiketsu!"	#13 「年始め！抱負言い合いっこ対決！	6:13
5.	#14 "Neoki sa Dokkiri de Tokkiri!"	#14 「寝起きドッキリでドッキリ！」	7:03
6.	#15 "Futsuota Special"	#15 「ふつおたスペシャル」	5:27
7.	"Break Time"	「ブレイクタイム」	3:16
8.	#16 "Ataru mo Hakke? Atarane mo Hakke?"	#16 「当たるも八卦？当たらぬも八卦？」	6:54
9.	#17 "Futsuota Special Sono 2"	#17 「ふつおたスペシャルその2	3:22
10.	#18 "Onna no Hito wa Nani o Hazukashii to Omou no ka?"	#18 「女の人は何を恥ずかしいと思うのか？」	6:38
11.	#19 "Kyou de Saishuukai?"	#19 「今日で最終回？」	4:55
12.	#20 "Honto ni Honto no Saishuukai!"	#20 「ホントにホントの最終回！」	4:33
13.	"Ending"	「エンディング」	1:45
