= Miki Inoue =

Japanese voice actress

Miki Inoue (井上 美紀, Inoue Miki; born 8 December 1967) is a Japanese voice actress affiliated with Aoni Production. Her hometown is Wakayama, Wakayama Prefecture.

== Filmography ==
=== Anime television series ===
- Binbō Shimai Monogatari (xxxx) - Telephone Guidance
- Shoot! (xxxx) - Michiko Izumi
- Neighborhood Story (xxxx) - Kindergarten Pupil
- Ghost Sweeper Mikami (xxxx) - Female Student, Villager, Staff
- GeGeGe no Kitarō (xxxx) - Chisato Watanabe
- Aquarian Age: Sign for Evolution (xxxx) - Chairmanship
- Magical Taruruto-kun (xxxx) - Girl, Hiker
- Ultimate Muscle (xxxx) - Mari Nikaidō
- Kiteretsu Daihyakka (1988) - Mami, Sachiko
- Kinnikuman: Scramble for the Throne (1991–92) - Mari Nikaidō, Robin Mask (young)
- Marmalade Boy (1994) - Yayoi Takase
- The King of Braves GaoGaiGar (1997) - Akiko Hirata
- Air Master (2003) - Masami Ishige
- Shuffle! (2005) - Mayumi Thyme, Masato's Mother
- Shuffle! Memories (2007) - Mayumi Thyme
- Lucky Star (2007) - Hikaru Sakuraba

=== OVA ===
- Slow Step (1991) - Staff (D)
- Ogre Slayer (1995) - Oyone
- Akane Maniax (2004) - Marimo Jingūji

=== Video games ===
- CAL III (1993) - Juno
- Eternal Melody (1996) - Iris
- Kyōfu Shimbun (1997) - Midoriko Nakagami
- Tea Society of a Witch (2002) - Megumi Yuhi
- Airforce Delta Strike (2004) - Amelia Johnson
- Shuffle! On the Stage (2005) - Mayumi Thyme
- Edelweiss (2006) - Haruka Aozora
- Muv-Luv (all ages version) (2006) - Marimo Jingūji
- Muv-Luv Alternative (all ages version) (2006) - Marimo Jingūji
- Lucky Star: Ryōō Gakuen Ōtōsai (2008) - Hikaru Sakuraba

=== Drama CD ===
- Edelweiss: Eidenjima Kafun Dai Sensō (xxx) - Haruka Aozora
- Shuffle! (xxxx) - Mayumi Thyme

=== Tokusatsu ===
- Engine Sentai Go-onger (2008–09) - Engine BearRV
- Engine Sentai Go-onger: Boom Boom! Bang Bang! GekijōBang!! (2008) - Engine BearRV
- Engine Sentai Go-onger vs. Gekiranger (2009) - Engine BearRV
- Samurai Sentai Shinkenger vs. Go-onger: GinmakuBang!! (2010) - Engine BearRV
- Kaizoku Sentai Gokaiger (2011) - Engine BearRV
- Bakuage Sentai Boonboomger (2024) - Engine BearRV

=== Dubbing Roles ===
- Chaotic - Codemaster Amzen
- Reigen Doushi
