= List of Vinland Saga chapters =

Two editions of the first tankōbon volume cover, the first one (left) released under the Shōnen Magazine Comics imprint, the second one (right) released under the Afternoon KC imprint.

Vinland Saga is a Japanese manga series written and illustrated by Makoto Yukimura, published by Kodansha. The series focuses on Thorfinn, a young Viking who wishes to avenge his father, Thors, who was killed by his current superior, Askeladd. The manga began serialization in April 2005 in the shōnen manga magazine Weekly Shōnen Magazine. In December 2005, it moved to the monthly seinen manga magazine Monthly Afternoon. The first two volumes were initially released under the Shōnen Magazine Comics imprint, and then reissued under the Afternoon KC imprint after the manga's serialization switch. As of September 2025, the chapters have been collected in twenty-nine tankōbon volumes.

The series is licensed for an English release in North America by Kodansha USA, which released it in a two-in-one hardcover edition. The first volume was published on October 14, 2013, and the fifteenth and final volume was published on October 13, 2026. During their panel at Anime NYC 2022, Kodansha USA announced that they would release a three-in-one hardcover deluxe edition of the series. The first volume was released on February 6, 2024.

== Volumes ==
No.	Original release date	Original ISBN	English release date	English ISBN
1	July 15, 2005 (Shōnen Magazine Comics); August 23, 2006 (Afternoon KC)	978-4-06-363559-1 (Shōnen Magazine Comics); 978-4-06-314423-9 (Afternoon KC)	October 15, 2013 (digital); October 14, 2013 (print)	978-1-61262-660-4 (digital); 978-1-61262-420-4 (print)
001. "Normanni" (北人, Norumanni); 002. "Somewhere Not Here" (ここではないどこか, Koko de wa Nai Dokoka); 003. "Beyond the Edge of the Sea" (海の果ての果て, Umi no Hate no Hate); 004. "Unbreakable Chains" (解かれ得ぬ鎖, Tokare Enu Kusari); 005. "Troll" (戦鬼, Tororu); Bonus Material. "Heroic Exploits of Viking Girl Ylva"
In 1013 AD, the young warrior Thorfinn is in the raiding party of the Viking Askeladd, doing jobs for the man in exchange for a duel with him. However, Thorfinn is easily defeated by his superior when he loses his temper after being reminded of his late father Thors, a very strong but peaceful man who died at Askeladd's hands. As Thorfinn rests alone, he remembers his childhood in Iceland when he wished to become an adventurer like his acquaintance Leif Eriksson, who often talked about a peaceful land known as Vinland. One day, the Jomsvikings appear in Iceland led by Floki to recruit Thors for a war.
2	November 17, 2005 (Shōnen Magazine Comics); August 23, 2006 (Afternoon KC)	978-4-06-363580-5 (Shōnen Magazine Comics); 978-4-06-314428-4 (Afternoon KC)	October 15, 2013 (digital); October 14, 2013 (print)	978-1-61262-660-4 (digital); 978-1-61262-420-4 (print)
006. "Messenger from the Battlefield" (戦場よりの使者, Senjō Yori no Shisha); 007. "Sword" (剣, Ken); 008. "The Journey Begins" (旅の始まり, Tabi no Hajimari); 009. "A Trap in Distant Seas" (絶海の罠, Zekkai no Wana); 010. "Night Wake" (夜の航跡, Yoru no Kōseki); 011. "Cage" (檻, Ori); 012. "More Than a Monster" (化け物以上上, Bakemono Ijō); 013. "Smell" (匂い, Nioi); 014. "The Sword of Thors" (トールズの剣, Tōruzu no Ken); 015. "A True Warrior" (本当の戦士, Hontō no Senshi); 016. "The Death of Thors" (トールズの死, Tōruzu no Shi); Special Report. "I Went to the Land of Aurora Borealis"
Floki conspires with Askeladd to slaughter Thors and his crew once they arrive at the Faroe Islands, as punishment for deserting fifteen years earlier. When Thors and rookie soldiers leave Iceland, Thorfinn hides in their ship, aspiring to become a warrior like his father. Askeladd's forces eventually cross paths with Thors. The two leaders engage in a one-on-one fight, and although Thors wins the duel, he gives up his life in exchange for the protection of his people. Thorfinn becomes enraged upon seeing his father's death and swears revenge against Askeladd, sneaking aboard the man's ship among the chaos.
3	October 23, 2006	978-4-06-314433-8	February 4, 2014 (digital); January 21, 2014 (print)	978-1-61262-661-1 (digital); 978-1-61262-421-1 (print)
017. "England, 1008 A.D." (イングランド―1008年―, Ingurando: 1008-nen); 018. "England, 1013 A.D." (イングランド―1013年―, Ingurando: 1013-nen); 019. "The Battle of London Bridge" (ロンドン橋の死闘, Rondon-bashi no Shitō); 020. "Ragnarok" (ラグナロク, Ragunaroku); 021. "Valhalla" (ヴァルハラ, Varuhara); Bonus Material. "Ylva at Work"
For the twelve years of his life following Thors's death, Thorfinn spends his life raiding alongside Askeladd's group who are siding with King Sweyn. While he succeeds in his goals, he cannot defeat Askeladd in a duel and is forced to retreat from a fight against Thorkell, who has sided with the English. Though unable to defeat Thorkell during the siege of London, the Danes decide to attack him again when they learn that he has kindapped Sweyn's son, Prince Canute. Askeladd decides to enter the fight as a third party. Meanwhile, in Iceland, Thors's wife and daughter mourn his death and Thorfinn's disappearance.
4	February 23, 2007	978-4-06-314440-6	February 4, 2014 (digital); January 21, 2014 (print)	978-1-61262-661-1 (digital); 978-1-61262-421-1 (print)
022. "The Troll's Son" (戦鬼の子, Tororu no Ko); 023. "Reinforcements" (援軍, Engun); 024. "The Land on the Far Bank" (対岸の国, Taigan no Kuni); 025. "Bluff" (ハッタリ, Hattari); 026. "Artorius" (アルトリウス, Arutoriusu); 027. "The Warriors and the Monk" (戦士と修道士, Senshi to Shūdōshi); 028. "Night Attack" (夜間襲撃, Yakan Shūgeki); Bonus Material. "Viking Girl Ylva, Hideo Nishimoto Edition"
Thorfinn and Askeladd manage to trick Thorkell's forces and save Canute alongside his servant Ragnar. Thorkell is curious about Thorfinn's ancestry, having fought alongside Thors in the past. In escaping from Thorkell, Askeladd's forces move to Wales. Privately with the Welsh commanders, Askeladd reveals himself as half-Welsh; the son of a high-ranking Viking, Olaf, and a Welsh woman with claimed ancestral ties to the legendary hero Artorius. As they move, Askeladd's Vikings commit mass murder to obtain food in a town.
5	October 23, 2007	978-4-06-314473-4	April 29, 2014	978-1-61262-699-4 (digital); 978-1-61262-422-8 (print)
029. "Father and Son" (父と子, Chichi to Ko); 030. "Master and Servant at the Table" (主従の食卓, Shujū no Shokutaku); 031. "History of Beasts" (ケダモノの歴史, Kedamono no Rekishi); 032. "Defectors" (逃亡兵団, Tōbō Heidan); 033. "Betrayal" (裏切り, Uragiri); 034. "Avalon" (アヴァロン, Avaron); 035. "Contact" (両軍接触, Ryōgun Sesshoku)
Askeladd kills Ragnar to awaken a more independent Canute. Meanwhile, Thorkell's forces drive Askeladd into a corner, leading to Askeladd's men rising up in a mutiny and Askeladd being forced to fight effectively alone. Fearing Askeladd will be killed by his foes, Thorfinn goes back to the battlefield, aiming to defeat Thorkell in order to prevent the outcome of Askeladd being killed by someone else. Thorkell happily agrees to fight Thorfinn.
6	June 23, 2008	978-4-06-314510-6	April 29, 2014	978-1-61262-699-4 (digital); 978-1-61262-422-8 (print)
036. "Two on the Battlefield" (戦場のふたり, Senjō no Futari); 037. "The Definition of Love" (愛の定義, Ai no Teigi); 038. "Out of the Cradle" (ゆりかごの外, Yurikago no Soto); 039. "The King Awakens" (王の目覚め, Ō no Mezame); 040. "The Legend of Thors" (トールズ伝, Tōruzu-den); 041. "United Front" (共闘, Kyōtō); 042. "Verdict" (裁定, Saitei); Bonus Material. "Dimly-Remembered Vinland Saga"
As Canute mourns Ragnar's death, he has a sharp reversal of personality, becomes strong and kingly, and develops an ambition to create utopia on Earth before God's return. He decides to stop the fights, with Bjorn being wounded in the process. Meanwhile, Thorfinn is stopped from fighting by Askeladd who instructs him to follow his orders to defeat Thorkell who is revealed to be related to Thor's, making them family. In the eventual fight, Thorfinn takes one of Thorkell's eyes but is attacked by his underlings before he can finish him. An enraged Thorkell accepts his defeat and decides to join Canute's quest to kill King Sweyn upon testing his new resolve.
7	February 23, 2009	978-4-06-314544-1	July 29, 2014	978-1-61262-700-7 (digital); 978-1-61262-423-5 (print)
043. "The Prince Returns" (王子生還, Ōji Seikan); 044. "The Curse of the Crown" (王冠の呪い, Ōkan no Noroi); 045. "His Last Friend" (最後の友達, Saigo no Tomodachi); 046. "Two Lone Wolves" (二匹の孤狼, Nihiki no Korō); 047. "There Hero Is Gone" (英雄不在, Eiyū Fuzai); 048. "Reunion" (再会, Saikai); 049. "Karlsefni" (カルルセヴニ, Karurusevuni)
Following Canute's return to his homeland, Askeladd plots the assassination of the King so that Canute will command the country. In the meantime, most of Askeladd's soldiers abandon him with the exception of Bjorn who is killed by him. Frustrated by Bjorn's confession of hoping to be his friend, Askeladd beats Thorfinn in a duel as he remembers how he committed patricide against Olaf for abandoning his mother. Shortly afterwards, a man tries to kill Canute, but, as he fails, Thorfinn meets Leif again who wants him to return to Iceland.
8	September 23, 2009	978-4-06-314581-6	July 29, 2014	978-1-61262-700-7 (digital); 978-1-61262-423-5 (print)
050. "Plot" (謀略, Bōryaku); 051. "Miscalculation" (誤算, Gosan); 052. "The Hero Returns" (英雄復活, Eiyū Fukkatsu); 053. "The Fury of Britannia's King" (ブリタニア王猛る, Buritania-ō Takeru); 054. "End of the Prologue" (END OF THE PROLOGUE); 055. "Slave" (奴隷, Dorei); 056. "Ketil's Farm" (ケティル農場, Ketiru Nōjō)
King Sweyn angers Askeladd in a meeting, having deduced his conspiracy, and plays with him by threatening to attack his homeland. Askeladd fakes madness and kills Sweyn so that Canute will kill him. As Thorfinn is alerted by this chaos, he reaches the scene as Canute kills Askeladd. Thorfinn is shocked to see Askeladd dying and tries to kill Canute, only to be interrupted by Thorkell. A year passes and a slave named Einar is sold to a farm owned by Ketil where a silent Thorfinn works and becomes attached to it upon seeing a beautiful slave named Arnheid.
9	June 23, 2010	978-4-06-310672-5	October 7, 2014	978-1-61262-817-2 (digital); 978-1-61262-424-2 (print)
057. "Young Master" (若様, Wakasama); 058. "The Men You're Allowed to Kill" (殺してもいい人間, Koroshite mo Ii Ningen); 059. "Snake" (蛇, Hebi); 060. "His First Friend" (最初の友達, Saisho no Tomodachi); 061. "The Way of Blood" (血の道, Chi no Michi); 062. "Canute's Way" (クヌートのやり方, Kunūto no Yarikata); 063. "I Need a Horse" (馬がほしい, Uma ga Hoshii); 064. "I Need a Horse, Part II" (続・馬がほしい, Zoku: Uma ga Hoshii)
Kethil's son Olmar wishes to become a warriors and the mercenaries decide to help by testing his weapon against the Thorfinn and Einar. Einar tries to stop them but Thorfinn allows them to be the target as he has no desire to live. The other mercenary Snake stops them before Thorfinn's death and tests him in combat to make him realize he wants to live. Einar becomes disturbed when learning that Thorfinn is a former Viking and tries to cheer him up even if he is still a slave. Meanwhile, a corrupted Canute uses violence to become the King of England. As Thorfinn and Einar keep working, they meet Kethil's father Sverker who gives lends them a horse in exchange of helping him with his farm.
10	April 22, 2011	978-4-06-310736-4	October 7, 2014	978-1-61262-817-2 (digital); 978-1-61262-424-2 (print)
065. "At the Old Master's House" (大旦那の家で, Ōdanna no Ie de); 066. "Budding" (発芽, Hatsuga); 067. "Iron Fist Ketil" (鉄拳ケティル, Tekken Ketiru); 068. "An Empty Man" (カラッポな男, Karappo na Otoko); 069. "Provocation" (いじめ, Ijime); 070. "The Dream" (夢の中身, Yume no Nakami); 071. "Oath" (誓い, Chikai)
Thorfinn and Einar become friends as they work together with the latter still feeling attracted to Arnheid. Arnheid is revealed to be Ketil's personal slave with the man having the reputation of feared veteran only to reveal to her his cowardice and his fears of being killed by Thorgil. As time passes, Einar learns that Thorfinn constantly suffers nightmares about his father and Askeladd, which leads to his sense of emptiness now that Askeladd is death and has no idea what to do after the violence he caused alongside him. When guards ruin their work, an enraged Einar tries to kill them only to be interrupted by Thorfinn's punch against them. In the aftermath, Einar forces them to escape while a wounded Thorfinn has another nightmare where he sees all his former partners in Valhalla. Upon seeing his own victims, Thorfinn is told by Askeladd to become a true warrior, which leads to his awakening and oath that he will never harm anybody again.
11	January 23, 2012	978-4-06-387801-1	September 29, 2015	978-1-61262-818-9 (digital); 978-1-61262-803-5 (print)
072. "The Curse of the Head" (呪いの首, Noroi no Kubi); 073. "When You're Free" (自由になったら, Jiyū ni Nattara); 074. "Escaped Slave" (逃亡奴隷, Tōbō Dorei); 075. "King and Sword" (王と剣, Ō to Ken); 076. "Olmar's Finest Hour" (オルマル晴れ舞台, Orumaru Hare Butai); 077. "Disgrace" (侮辱, Bujoku); 078. "Treason" (反逆罪, Hangyaku-zai)
Canute poisons his brother King Harald to take over Denmark following his death which causes him to suffer hallucinations in the form of his father's severed head that taunts him. With Denmark under Canute's control, the King talks with Ketil in regard to the values of his farm which Harald valued. Accompanying his father, Olmar requests to join Canute's army but fails in a test and is humiliated. The embarrassment causes him to face Canute's servants. Thorgil takes advantage of the situation to kill the soldiers following Olmar's first victory. A shocked Ketil escapes to his farm with his children in Leif's ship as the latter discovers Thorfinn on their farm. Canute decides to take this situation to take over Denmark's farm by force.
12	November 22, 2012	978-4-06-387850-9	September 29, 2015	978-1-61262-818-9 (digital); 978-1-61262-803-5 (print)
079. "Portents of Storm Clouds" (暗雲の先触れ, An'un no Sakibure); 080. "Gardar's Assault" (ガルザル来襲, Garuzaru Raishū); 081. "Storm" (嵐, Arashi); 082. "Bondage" (縛め, Imashime); 083. "Atonement" (償い, Tsugunai); 084. "A Convenient Dream" (都合のいい夢, Tsugō no Ii Yume); 085. "Confrontation" (対決, Taiketsu); 086. "No Going Home" (帰れないふたり, Kaerenai Futari)
In the farm, Thorfinn and Einar discuss what to do once they are free as they have nearly finished taking the forest down that Ketil requested. Meanwhile, Sverker's health deteriorates which causes Arnheid to make him a meal with Snake and the two slaves. The farm is then invaded by Arnheid's missing husband Gardar who escaped from his own slavery and killed mercenaries to escape with her wife. Snake manages to defeat Snake and lock him. With Arnheid wanting to free her husband, Thorfinn, Einar and Sverker aid him into tricking Snake that he escaped but he confuses him for Einar. Thorfinn uses the distraction to help Arnheid and Gardar to escape but is eventually forced to use violence to face the mercenary. Equally matched, Snake deals a fatal wound in Gardar instead. Despite his condition, Gardar tries to kill Snake and escapes with his wife only to die on the way as he remembers their son.
13	July 23, 2013	978-4-06-387909-4	December 29, 2015	978-1-63236-008-3 (digital); 978-1-63236-009-0 (print)
087. "The First Move" (最初の手段, Saisho no Shudan); 088. "Punishment" (罰, Batsu); 089. "The Eve of Battle" (開戦前夜, Kaisen Zen'ya); 090. "Price of the Food" (飯の代金, Meshi no Daikin); 091. "The Battle of Ketil Farm" (ケティル農場の戦い, Ketiru Nōjō no Tatakai); 092. "Hundred-Count" (百数える間, Hyaku Kazoeru Aida); 093. "Birth of a Warrior" (戦士の誕生, Senshi no Tanjō)
Leif's group reaches the farm where a broke down Ketil starts torturing Arnheid for trying to abandon him. As Snake calms Ketil, Canute's forces reach the area too in order to claim it by force. Leif takes Thorfinn, Einar and the wounded Arnheid with him to go back to Iceland but Arnheid deteriorates after Thorfinn tries to comfort her. In the aftermath, a emotionally destroyed Einar is motivated by Thorfinn's desire to form a peaceful area in Vinland in memory of the woman he loved.
14	February 21, 2014	978-4-06-387956-8	December 29, 2015	978-1-63236-008-3 (digital); 978-1-63236-009-0 (print)
094. "Recommendation of Surrender" (降伏勧告, Kōfuku Kankoku); 095. "Forgotten Things" (忘れ物, Wasuremono); 096. "Invincible" (無敵, Muteki); 097. "Emperor of Rebellion" (叛逆の帝王, Hangyaku no Teiō); 098. "Two Paradises" (ふたつの楽土, Futatsu no Rakudo); 099. "Departure" (船出, Funade); 100. "Homecoming" (帰郷, Kikyō)
Thorfinn is unable to escape as he feels in debt to the farm for taking care of him after he stopped being a fighter. He then interrupts the war between Canute's and Thorgil's forces. He begs Canute's soldiers to have a meeting with the King to end the war and accepts receiving a hundred punches in exchange for such request. As Thorfinn takes several punches, the soldiers begin and Einar find this sacrifice ridiculous but Thorfinn is able to make peace with the army. Canute then appears and tells his former bodyguard. Thorfinn realizes that he cannot convince Canute to alter his path, and states that he will travel far away from the reach of the king. Canute is bemused, but he accepts Thorfinn's choice, he alters his plan to forcefully seize farms. In the aftermath, Olmar takes inherits the farm, while Leif takes Thorfinn and Einar to Iceland where the former Viking meets his sister and mother after several years.
15	October 23, 2014	978-4-06-387999-5	December 27, 2016	978-1-68233-540-6 (digital); 978-1-63236-372-5 (print)
101. "The Fettered Tern (1)" (繋がれたアジサシ(クリーア)1, Tsunagareta Ajisashi (Kurīa) 1) (Note: In the Japanese release, the titles of the "Fettered Tern" chapters feature the word kurīa (クリーア) in parentheses after the main part of the title. This is a rendering of kría, the Icelandic word for the Arctic tern.); 102. "The Fettered Tern (2)" (繋がれたアジサシ(クリーア)2, Tsunagareta Ajisashi (Kurīa) 2); 103. "The Fettered Tern (3)" (繋がれたアジサシ(クリーア)3, Tsunagareta Ajisashi (Kurīa) 3); 104. "The Fettered Tern (4)" (繋がれたアジサシ(クリーア)4, Tsunagareta Ajisashi (Kurīa) 4); 105. "The Fettered Tern (5)" (繋がれたアジサシ(クリーア)5, Tsunagareta Ajisashi (Kurīa) 5); 106. "The Fettered Tern (6)" (繋がれたアジサシ(クリーア)6, Tsunagareta Ajisashi (Kurīa) 6); 107. "The Fettered Tern (7)" (繋がれたアジサシ(クリーア)7, Tsunagareta Ajisashi (Kurīa) 7)
Thorfinn explains his family what he did after Thors' death and how he aims to redeem himself by starting a peaceful land in Vinland. Though he gains their support, he still needs the money to prepare a ship. When a young woman named Gudrid demands Leif to take her away, her fiance Sigurd believes their group attacked upon seeing Gudrid's hair cut in order to count as a man instead. Sigurd's father Halfdan interrupts this and learns of his desire of raising lands in Vinland. He tests Thorfinn's resolve to afford ships to move the land he and Einar learned how to farm. In the end, Thorfinn and Leif decide to sell horns in Greece to get the money needed to prepare for the later journey to Vinland. As the group prepares, Gudrid attacks Sigurd after their wedding and escapes to Leif's side.
16	June 23, 2015	978-4-06-388062-5	December 27, 2016	978-1-68233-540-6 (digital); 978-1-63236-372-5 (print)
108. "The Fettered Tern (8)" (繋がれたアジサシ(クリーア)8, Tsunagareta Ajisashi (Kurīa) 8); 109. "The Liberated Tern" (放たれたアジサシ(クリーア), Hanatareta Ajisashi (Kurīa)); 110. "Crossing the North Sea" (北海横断, Hokkai Ōdan); 111. "From Warrior to Warrior" (戦士から、戦士へ, Senshi kara, Senshi e); 112. "Obligatory Vengeance" (復讐の義務, Fukushū no Gimu); 113. "Troublemakers" (厄介な奴ら, Yakkai na Yatsura); 114. "The Hunter and the Hunted (1)" (狩る者 狩られる者1, Karu Mono Karareru Mono 1); 115. "The Hunter and the Hunted (2)" (狩る者 狩られる者2, Karu Mono Karareru Mono 2)
Fearing they will be also attacked, Thorfinn convinces Leif and the others to escape with Gudrid now that she reached them. The group sets sail earlier Greece but take a different route in order to avoid Thorfinn's family from Iceland being also blamed. As they explore to get resources, Thorfinn explores a village with no living civilians as a result of a feud between families resulted in a viking massacre. Thorfinn then finds a dying woman who is carrying a baby named Karli. As the woman dies, Thorfinn decides to take care of Karli with his group but find no help from other villagers. This eventually results in Thorfinn adopting the baby and having the group help him. Sigurd also appears to kill Gudrid when learning where she left resulting into another escape. The group once again tries to rest but they are attacked by a wild bear that Thorfinn and Einar confront. They are saved by the Norway hunter Hild whose father was killed by Thorfinn during his time as a mercenary for Askeladd and now wants revenge.
17	January 22, 2016	978-4-06-388109-7	June 27, 2017	978-1-68233-759-2 (digital); 978-1-63236-445-6 (print)
116. "The Hunter and the Hunted (3)" (狩る者 狩られる者3, Karu Mono Karareru Mono 3); 117. "The Hunter and the Hunted (4)" (狩る者 狩られる者4, Karu Mono Karareru Mono 4); 118. "The Hunter and the Hunted (5)" (狩る者 狩られる者5, Karu Mono Karareru Mono 5); 119. "The Hunter and the Hunted (6)" (狩る者 狩られる者6, Karu Mono Karareru Mono 6); 120. "The Hunter and the Hunted (7)" (狩る者 狩られる者7, Karu Mono Karareru Mono 7); 121. "The Hunter and the Hunted (8)" (狩る者 狩られる者8, Karu Mono Karareru Mono 8); 122. "The Hunter and the Hunted (9)" (狩る者 狩られる者9, Karu Mono Karareru Mono 9)
In order to force Thorfinn to fight her, Hild lies that she gave all of his friends a poison through their recent meal and she has the cure. Thorfinn decides to face the hunter in the forests while his friends leave to the ship. Thorfinn is still unwilling to fight her which causes him to receive wounds to his legs. Eventually, Thorfinn gives up and asks Hild to spare him until he finishes the utopia of Vinland. As Einar and the rest return to beg for Thorfinn's life, Hild agrees with them but under the condition she stays with Thorfinn in their journey.
18	August 23, 2016	978-4-06-388170-7	June 27, 2017	978-1-68233-759-2 (digital); 978-1-63236-445-6 (print)
123. "A Borrowed Life" (借り物の命, Karimono no Inochi); 124. "Departing Norway" (ノルウェー出立, Noruwē Shuppatsu); 125. "War In The Baltic (1)" (バルト海戦役1, Baruto-kai Sen'eki 1); 126. "War In The Baltic (2)" (バルト海戦役2, Baruto-kai Sen'eki 2); 127. "War In The Baltic (3)" (バルト海戦役3, Baruto-kai Sen'eki 3); 128. "War In The Baltic (4)" (バルト海戦役4, Baruto-kai Sen'eki 4); 129. "War In The Baltic (5)" (バルト海戦役5, Baruto-kai Sen'eki 5)
After resting in Norway, Thorfinn's crew moves on making their way through the Baltic Sea until resting in lands from Denmark. The former Viking's fame causes all the soldiers to remember him with the Jomsviking Thorkell recognizing his skills as a warrior once again. Thorkell has Thorfinn talk with Commander Floki in order to request him to become their new leader as he possesses both skills and youth in contrast to their Floki's successor who is still too young. Although Thorfinn does not accept such proposal, Floki has memories of his father Thors who worked alongside him and decides to send two ships to kill him. When Thorfinn's group is leaving, they notice the Jomsviking following them and Thorfinn decides to stay with Hild to protect his allies. Although Thorfinn easily defeats most of the soldiers with Hild's aid, one of them claims they are actually working for Vagn rather than Floki and requests to follow him.
19	April 21, 2017	978-4-06-388251-3	June 5, 2018	978-1-64212-263-3 (digital); 978-1-63236-630-6 (print)
130. "War In The Baltic (6)" (バルト海戦役6, Baruto-kai Sen'eki 6); 131. "War In The Baltic (7)" (バルト海戦役7, Baruto-kai Sen'eki 7); 132. "War In The Baltic (8)" (バルト海戦役8, Baruto-kai Sen'eki 8); 133. "War In The Baltic (9)" (バルト海戦役9, Baruto-kai Sen'eki 9); 134. "War In The Baltic (10)" (バルト海戦役10, Baruto-kai Sen'eki 10); 135. "War In The Baltic (11)" (バルト海戦役11, Baruto-kai Sen'eki 11); 136. "War In The Baltic (12)" (バルト海戦役12, Baruto-kai Sen'eki 12); Side Story: Dogland Saga
Vagn tries to manipulate Thorfinn into helping him kill Floki, revealing he was the man who hired Askeladd to take Thors' life. Though Thorfinn denies, he feels his past rage returning with such idea. Meanwhile, an imprisoned Sigurd and his group become warrior fighting alongside Thorkell. As Thorfinn and Hild attempt to leave, they turn against Vagn upon learning his forces were violating innocent women. However, they are then attacked by Floki's young mercenary Garm and his forces. Garm decapitates Vagn, enraging Thorkell for taking his prey and goes after him. Overwhelmed in combat, Thorfinn decides to escape from Garm alongside Hild. Wishing to face Thorfinn in combat again, Garm kidnaps Einar, Leif and Gudrid to take his enemy's attention, leaving behind Bug Eyes to use him communicate with Thorfinn.
20	November 22, 2017	978-4-06-510362-3	June 5, 2018	978-1-64212-263-3 (digital); 978-1-63236-630-6 (print)
137. "War In The Baltic (13)" (バルト海戦役13, Baruto-kai Sen'eki 13); 138. "War In The Baltic (14)" (バルト海戦役14, Baruto-kai Sen'eki 14); 139. "War In The Baltic (15)" (バルト海戦役15, Baruto-kai Sen'eki 15); 140. "War In The Baltic (16)" (バルト海戦役16, Baruto-kai Sen'eki 16); 141. "War In The Baltic (17)" (バルト海戦役17, Baruto-kai Sen'eki 17); 142. "War In The Baltic (18)" (バルト海戦役18, Baruto-kai Sen'eki 18); 143. "War In The Baltic (19)" (バルト海戦役19, Baruto-kai Sen'eki 19); 144. "War In The Baltic (20)" (バルト海戦役20, Baruto-kai Sen'eki 20)
Garm is imprisoned by Floki in the Jomsborg stronghold alongside his hostages for causing Thorkell's rebellion. However, he is later sent to their enemy to negotiate with the Viking. Intriguided by the mercenary's skill for his achievement, Thorkell frees Garm and challenges him to a one-on-one fight. As both are equally matched and suffer several wounds, Thorkell's forces agree with freeing Garm. Meanwhie, Floki's grandson Baldr frees Einar, Leif and Gudrid after learning they are related to Thorfinn and wants to request his aid with leadership of the Jomsvikings until he becomes an adult. Though Baldr manages to make Einar and Leif leave, soldiers see this act, forcing Gudrid to act like she is actually a maid. As Einar and Leif are forced to leave, the latter receives an arrow to his back which severely wounds him. Thorkell is also wounded while attacking Jombsborg which causes him to retreat. Einar, Leif and Thorkell's group then find Thorfinn's grup who inform him of the current situation which causes him to decide to rescue Gudrid.
21	August 23, 2018	978-4-06-512433-8	December 17, 2019	978-1-64659-129-9 (digital); 978-1-63236-803-4 (print)
145. "War In The Baltic (21)" (バルト海戦役21, Baruto-kai Sen'eki 21); 146. "War In The Baltic (22)" (バルト海戦役22, Baruto-kai Sen'eki 22); 147. "War In The Baltic (23)" (バルト海戦役23, Baruto-kai Sen'eki 23); 148. "War In The Baltic (24)" (バルト海戦役24, Baruto-kai Sen'eki 24); 149. "War In The Baltic (25)" (バルト海戦役25, Baruto-kai Sen'eki 25); 150. "War In The Baltic (26)" (バルト海戦役26, Baruto-kai Sen'eki 26); 151. "War In The Baltic (27)" (バルト海戦役27, Baruto-kai Sen'eki 27); 152. "War In The Baltic (28)" (バルト海戦役28, Baruto-kai Sen'eki 28)
Thorfinn and his allies infiltrate Jombsborg to find Gudrid. One of her friends recognizes Thorfinn by sharing the name of Karli's dog and leads him to Gudrid and Baldr. Despite Baldr's request to have him lead the Jomsvikings, Thorfinn denies such proposal. Just then, Floki appears in the area enraging Thorfinn as he finally has the chance to avenge his father. However, when Baldr takes the blame and attempts to shield his grandfather, Thorfinn regains his composture. The Jomsborg then becomes a war area with Baldr proposing Thorfinn to use him as hostage so that Floki's forces will be unable to attack him and eventually leave. However, Garn returns, demanding back his weapons and eventually challeneges Thorfinn to another one-on-one fight. Thorfinn is forced to fight back while Gudrid and Sigurd escape.
22	June 21, 2019	978-4-06-515180-8	December 17, 2019	978-1-64659-129-9 (digital); 978-1-63236-803-4 (print)
153. "War In The Baltic (29)" (バルト海戦役29, Baruto-kai Sen'eki 29); 154. "War In The Baltic (30)" (バルト海戦役30, Baruto-kai Sen'eki 30); 155. "War In The Baltic (31)" (バルト海戦役31, Baruto-kai Sen'eki 31); 156. "War In The Baltic (32)" (バルト海戦役32, Baruto-kai Sen'eki 32); 157. "War In The Baltic (33)" (バルト海戦役33, Baruto-kai Sen'eki 33); 158. "War In The Baltic (34)" (バルト海戦役33, Baruto-kai Sen'eki 34); 159. "War In The Baltic (35)" (バルト海戦役35, Baruto-kai Sen'eki 35); 160. "War In The Baltic (36)" (バルト海戦役36, Baruto-kai Sen'eki 36)
The war continues in Jombsborg with Thorkell's arrival to the battlefield, demanding Floki's death. Thorfinn still keeps his original wounds from his previous fight with Garn. As a result, inspired by Askeladd's tricks, Thorfinn gives up his weapon and mocks Garn's own dependence on a weapon to fight. This enrages Garn causing him to give up his weapon but is easily defeated in hand-to-hand combat. Thorfinn eventually leaves the battlefield but decides to stop the war after an encounter with Thorkell. Under orders from Canute, Thorfinn becomes the new leader from the Jomsvikings and gives two orders to his soldiers: Floki should be exiled rather than be killed by Thorkell while the entire organization will disbanded. In exchange of freeing Floki, Thorfinn accepts a duel with Thorkell. However, an enraged Gudrid instead tries to take his place in the fight against Thorkell who wonders why is she so interested in his rival. When Gudrid admits she is in love with Thorfinn, Thorkell quits the duel and tells Thorfinn to take care of the young woman.
23	November 22, 2019	978-4-06-517507-1	November 23, 2021 (digital); December 14, 2021 (print)	978-1-63699-119-1 (digital); 978-1-64651-077-1 (print)
161. "Sigurd's Decision" (シグルドの決断, Shigurudo no Ketsudan); 162. "Sigurd's Return" (シグルドの帰還, Shigurudo no Kikan); 163. "Siggy and Hall" (シグやんとハトちゃん, Shigu-yan to Hato-chan); 164. "Sigurd's Resistance" (シグルドの反抗, Shigurudo no Hankō); 165. "Sigurd's Departure" (シグルドの出立, Shigurudo no Shuttatsu); 166. "Marriage" (結婚, Kekkon); Extra. "For Our Farewell is Near" (さようならが近いので, Sayōnara ga Chikai no de) (Oneshot originally published in 2004)
After hearing of Gudrid's feelings, Sigurd returns to Iceland without her and confronts his father, Halfdan. After presenting himself, Sigurd claims he does not want to inherit Halfdan's power and instead wants to live free and carry his own dream like Thorfinn. Disappointed by his rebellious change, Halfdan has Sigurd and his friends imprisoned. One night, Sigurd's childhood friend Hallgerd frees Sigurd under the promise he will take him. The two and their allies escape on a ship from Iceland which pleases Halfdan for the first time. A few years later, Thorfinn returns to Iceland with several new ships obtained thanks to the multiple sales they made in Miklagard with Halfdan's horns. A confused Ylva tries to confront her brother but ends up shocked when learning that he got married to Gudrid and both have adopted Karli as their son. The volume ends with a one-shot about the last days of the life of Shinsengumi Okita Sōji who got a major disease that results into his removal from the Government's group.
24	October 23, 2020	978-4-06-521004-8	November 23, 2021 (digital); December 14, 2021 (print)	978-1-63699-119-1 (digital); 978-1-64651-077-1 (print)
167. "Voyage to the West (1)" (西方航路①, Seihō Kōro (1)); 168. "Voyage to the West (2)" (西方航路②, Seihō Kōro (2)); 169. "Voyage to the West (3)" (西方航路③, Seihō Kōro (3)); 170. "Voyage to the West (4)" (西方航路④, Seihō Kōro (4)); 171. "Voyage to the West (5)" (西方航路⑤, Seihō Kōro (5)); 172. "Voyage to the West (6)" (西方航路⑥, Seihō Kōro (6)); 173. "Voyage to the West (7)" (西方航路⑦, Seihō Kōro (7)); 174. "Voyage to the West (8)" (西方航路⑧, Seihō Kōro (8)); 175. "Voyage to the West (9)" (西方航路⑨, Seihō Kōro (9))
After resting in Iceland, Thorfinn's group prepare their journey to Vinland by planning stops in Greenland to obtain new people and then sail to the West by also going through Markland. However, there are mixed feelings with the people with Bug Eyes declining the journey now that his adoptive father, Leif, has aged. Thorfinn requests several people to join him to make Vinland an ideal utopia where there will be no slaves or fights but several soldiers led by Ivar are against his ideals of avoiding weapons like swords. Thorfinn's requests reach the attention of Halfdan's slave Galvar, also known as Cordelia; The slave is Thorkell's child who was meant to be taken to the battlefield but the wife lied about the gender to avoid that. After the mother passes away, Galvar is a slave but Thorfinn convinces Halfdan to free her under the exchange of lands from Vinland. Cordelia joins Thorfinn who is also accepted by Ivar's group. As time passes, Sigurd returns to Iceland with his wife and baby which causes Halfdan to choose his grandchild as his successor. Thorfinn's group then reunties their ships and set sail for Vinland.
25	July 21, 2021	978-4-06-523605-5	December 20, 2022 (digital); January 10, 2023 (print)	978-1-63699-191-7 (digital); 978-1-64651-301-7 (print)
176. "Voyage to the West (10)" (西方航路⑩, Seihō Kōro (10)); 177. "Voyage to the West (11)" (西方航路⑪, Seihō Kōro (11)); 178. "Voyage to the West (12)" (西方航路⑫, Seihō Kōro (12)); 179. "Voyage to the West (13)" (西方航路⑬, Seihō Kōro (13)); 180. "Voyage to the West (14)" (西方航路⑭, Seihō Kōro (14)); 181. "The Name of the Village is..." (村の名前は, Mura no Namae wa); 182. "The Most Frightening Man" (いちばん恐ろしい男, Ichiban Osoroshii Otoko); 183. "Natives" (先住民, Senjūmin)
In their journey, Thorfinn says farewell to a senile Leif who is glad with his growth. The group of ships containing forty people travel between countries until reaching Vinland which Thorfinn finds dangerous after seeing signs of a conflict. As a result, they form a base in a town they name after statue Einar obtained in Greece named after Arnheid. As they work in farming during their time in Vinland, Thorfinn has conflicts with his mates who claim that they should be prepare for a war with the natives, the Mi'kmaq. The natives become concerned about the appearances of the new people living in Vinland. After a conversation with the shaman, the natives decide to confront Thorfinn's group.
26	May 23, 2022	978-4-06-527928-1	December 20, 2022 (digital); January 10, 2023 (print)	978-1-63699-191-7 (digital); 978-1-64651-301-7 (print)
184. "Lnu" (ウーヌゥ, Wunu); 185. "Niskawaji'j's Dream" (ニスカワジージュの夢, Nisukawajīju no Yume); 186. "Cordelia's Anguish" (コ—デリアの懊悩, Kōderia no Ōnō); 187. "Niskawaji'j's Expedition" (ニスカワジージュの探検, Nisukawajīju no Tanken); 188. "Hild and the God of the Forest" (ヒルドと森の神, Hirudo to Mori no Kami); 189. "Miskwekepu'j's Ritual" (ミスグェゲブージュの秘術, Misugwegebūju no Hijutsu); 190. "The Ragnarok Dialogue" (ラグナロク問答, Ragunaroku Mondō); 191. "The Day Arrives" (その日, Sono Hi)
Despite not knowing each other's languages, Thorfinn manages to communicate with the Mi'kmaq on a friendly manner. However, Galvar and his men reveal they sneaked in weapons and try to convince Cordelia to join them to prepare for the day they will turn against Thorfinn's ideals. A young native named Niskawaji'j moves to the farm and starts teaching Bug Eyes how to communicate with their group. Meanwhile, the elderly shaman Miskwekepu'j foresees the coming of major war the more time passes and more people invade their lands. As this happens, the story moves back years before to the day Thorfinn disbanded the Jomsvikings and it is revealed that he convinced several of their men to join his group before Canute executed them. Back to the present, Gudrid reveals she is pregnant much to Thorfinn's and Karli's joy which causes Hild to be moved by how Thorfinn done since they and forgives him for his actions.
27	June 22, 2023	978-4-06-531910-9	May 27, 2025	979-8-89478-577-6 (digital); 978-1-64651-955-2 (print)
192. "Thousand-Year Voyage (1)" (千年航路①, Sennen Kōro (1)); 193. "Thousand-Year Voyage (2)" (千年航路②, Sennen Kōro (2)); 194. "Thousand-Year Voyage (3)" (千年航路③, Sennen Kōro (3)); 195. "Thousand-Year Voyage (4)" (千年航路④, Sennen Kōro (4)); 196. "Thousand-Year Voyage (5)" (千年航路⑤, Sennen Kōro (5)); 197. "Thousand-Year Voyage (6)" (千年航路⑥, Sennen Kōro (6)); 198. "Thousand-Year Voyage (7)" (千年航路⑦, Sennen Kōro (7)); 199. "Thousand-Year Voyage (8)" (千年航路⑧, Sennen Kōro (8)); 200. "Thousand-Year Voyage (9)" (千年航路⑨, Sennen Kōro (9)); 201. "Thousand-Year Voyage (10)" (千年航路⑩, Sennen Kōro (10))
Several former Jomsvikings die in Markland after fighting the Mi'kmaq. This alerts Thorfinn's people, and Styrk and Ivar lead a group of men who want to prepare for war with the nearby people. However, Thorfinn insists that they should maintain the peace, so he has Bugeyes learn the native language of the Niskawaji'j. However, Miskwekepu'j sees no possibility of peace and attacks Thorfinn with an axe instead. Before Thorfinn can stop him, Ivar slices Miskwekepu'j's arm with his sword. The elder survives thanks to quick treatment, but a fort is built to separate the two groups living in Vinland. Thorfinn and Einar discuss the situation while farming, concluding that the colonization will end in failure. Hild sees the potential danger that Ivar and Styrk could bring, so she tries to kill them both, but Thorfinn begs her to return.
28	June 21, 2024	978-4-06-535519-0	May 27, 2025	979-8-89478-577-6 (digital); 978-1-64651-955-2 (print)
202. "Thousand-Year Voyage (11)" (千年航路⑪, Sennen Kōro (11)); 203. "Thousand-Year Voyage (12)" (千年航路⑫, Sennen Kōro (12)); 204. "Thousand-Year Voyage (13)" (千年航路⑬, Sennen Kōro (13)); 205. "Thousand-Year Voyage (14)" (千年航路⑭, Sennen Kōro (14)); 206. "Thousand-Year Voyage (15)" (千年航路⑮, Sennen Kōro (15)); 207. "Thousand-Year Voyage (16)" (千年航路⑯, Sennen Kōro (16)); 208. "Thousand-Year Voyage (17)" (千年航路⑰, Sennen Kōro (17)); 209. "Thousand-Year Voyage (18)" (千年航路⑱, Sennen Kōro (18))
A former Jomsvikings revealed that several native corpses appeared in Markland. This led to the misconception that the Norse had brought a disease to Vinland. Upon hearing this, Thorfinn, Einar, and Bugeyes try to convince Hild not to attack Miskwekepu'j. Eventually, the four are confronted by L'nu, who claims that they want to leave their lands because of the disease, or else they will start a war. Thorfinn agrees to let his people escape, but the natives become violent and start chasing them. Meanwhile, Gudrid begins giving birth to her child ten days early. The natives continued to attack the Norse, but they retreat from the village when Cordelia used her strength to protect the house where Gudrid gave birth to Thorfinn's son. The natives then confront Ivar's men, slaughtering them to steal their weapons and kill the Norse.
29	September 22, 2025	978-4-06-539413-7	October 6, 2026 (digital); October 13, 2026 (print)	979-8-89830-243-6 (digital); 979-8-88877-934-7 (print)
210. "Thousand-Year Voyage (19)" (千年航路⑲, Sennen Kōro (19)); 211. "Thousand-Year Voyage (20)" (千年航路⑳, Sennen Kōro (20)); 212. "Thousand-Year Voyage (21)" (千年航路㉑, Sennen Kōro (21)); 213. "Thousand-Year Voyage (22)" (千年航路㉒, Sennen Kōro (22)); 214. "Thousand-Year Voyage (23)" (千年航路㉓, Sennen Koro (23)); 215. "Thousand-Year Voyage (24)" (千年航路㉔, Sennen Koro (24)); 216. "Thousand-Year Voyage (25)" (千年航路㉕, Sennen Kōro (25)); 217. "Thousand-Year Voyage (26)" (千年航路㉖, Sennen Kōro (26)); 218. "Thousand-Year Voyage (27)" (千年航路㉗, Sennen Kōro (27)); 219. "As Many Times" (何度でも, Nandodemo); 220. "Somewhere Not Here" (ココジャナイドコカ, Koko Ja Nai Dokoka)
Thorfinn is a victim of multiple arrow wounds. His health deteriorates, and he starts to suffer from hallucinations of people judging his values and whether he is worthy of dying yet. Hild and Plmk save him and take him to a native house to treat his wounds. Meanwhile, Bug-Eyes and Einar return with the Norse to start a war against the natives, who are now attacking them. The women retreat to a safe land while the men fight. During the battle, Einar is forced to kill for the first time, a sin he cannot forget. A weakened Thorfinn requests an alliance with Miskwekepu'j, despite warnings from the natives that his life is still in danger. Thorfinn returns to his people to escape Vinland and end the war, but Styrk demands the death of a warrior. Before he can be stopped, Styrk kills Einar. After burying his best friend, Thorfinn teaches a Native American how to farm, but he fails to stop another from abandoning his new weapon. Bug Eyes goes into exile with Niskawaji'j to hide their forbidden relationship, and Thorfinn reunites with his family and their new child. In the final pages, the Vinland natives learn to farm.
