= Canto della Verbena =

Traditional song from Siena, Italy

"Canto della Verbena" (Italian, "Song of the Verbena"), officially "E mentre Siena dorme" ("And while Siena sleeps") and also known simply as "la Verbena", is a traditional song from the city of Siena, Italy. Its common title and lyrics refer to the verbena plant, which, according to local folklore, grew within the Piazza del Campo thanks to the presence of the Bottini di Siena, a series of underground tunnels used to provision the city with water in the mediaeval period. Today, "la Verbena" has become a hymn to the city of Siena, and is popularly sung at sporting events like those of the Palio di Siena and of the local Robur Siena football club.

On 12–13 March 2020, a viral tweet circulated that showed a video of residents, who were under generalised quarantine due to the COVID-19 pandemic, singing "la Verbena" together from their windows. This was one of many reports of community music-making that surfaced in Italy during the quarantine.

== Lyrics ==
The first verse of the traditional lyrics is little-known, sung neither during the palio di Siena nor on other occasions. The second verse is most well-known and frequently sung outside of the context of the palio.

Italian lyrics

E mentre Siena dorme, tutto tace
E la luna illumina la Torre
Senti nel buio, sola nella pace,
Sommessa Fonte Gaia
Che canta una canzon'
D'amore e di passion'

Nella Piazza del Campo
Ci nasce la verbena
Viva la nostra Siena
Viva la nostra Siena
Nella Piazza del Campo
Ci nasce la verbena
Viva la nostra Siena
La più bella delle città!

English translation

And while Siena sleeps, all is quiet
And the moon illuminates the Tower
Hear in the dark, only in the peace,
Soft Fonte Gaia
Who sings a song
Of love and passion

In the Piazza del Campo
where the verbena was born
Viva our Siena
Viva our Siena
In the Piazza del Campo
where the verbena was born
Viva our Siena
The greatest of the cities!

During the palio, the above version is never sung by the residents of the participating contrades; rather, these lyrics remain as a contrade-neutral version of the song. Lyrical variations set to the same melody very commonly come into existence. Often goliardic, these may be battle hymns for one's own contrade or a taunt for an opposing one. Ad hoc versions are also frequently heard, such as those referring to a particular event like a victory or a rival contrade's defeat, or even hymns dedicated to a particular jockey or horse.

A common palio-specific hymn is sung as follows:

Italian lyrics

Si sa che 'un lo volete
Il nostro bel [name of contrade]
Per forza e per amore
Per forza e per amore
Si sa che 'un lo volete
Il nostro bel [name of contrade]
Per forza e per amore
Lo dovete rispettà

English translation

Yes, you know you don't want it
Our beautiful [name of contrade]
(But) For strength and for love
(But) For strength and for love
Yes, you know you don't want it
Our beautiful [name of contrade]
(But) For strength and for love
You must respect it

When a contrade is victorious, the last line may instead be sung: "per forza e per amore / vi s'è fatto ripurgà" ("for strength and for love / you have been purged"), a derisive taunt towards a rival contrade that has just been defeated ("purged").
