= Sayaka Aoki (voice actress) =

Japanese voice actress

- あおき さやか
- Born: October 19, 1972 (age 54)
- Other name: Shizuka Aoki (青木 静香)
- Occupation: Voice actress

Sayaka Aoki (あおき さやか, Aoki Sayaka; October 19, 1972) is a Japanese voice actress. She is affiliated with Bell Production management. She is originally from Akita Prefecture. She sometimes uses Shizuka Aoki (青木 静香, Aoki Shizuka) for stage performances.

== Filmography ==
=== Anime series ===
- Coji-Coji (1997) – Coji-Coji
- Cosmic Baton Girl Comet-san (2001) – Raba-pyon, Kyoko Sensei
- Sonic X (2003) – Cream the Rabbit, Vanilla
- The World of Narue (2003) – Tomi Morino
- Lime-iro Senkitan (2003) – Kinu Fukushima, Theme Song Performance
- Wind: A Breath of Heart (2004) – Wakaba Fujimiya
- Shuffle! (2005) – Lisianthus
- The Melancholy of Haruhi Suzumiya (2006) – Kyon's sister
- Baccano (2007) – Miria Harvent
- Shuffle! Memories (2007) – Lisianthus
- Da Capo II (2007) – Harimao, Minatsu Amakase,
- Ef: A Fairy Tale of the Two (2007) – Sumire Aso
- Nanatsuiro Drops (2007) – Yayoi Amenomori
- Da Capo II Second Season (2008) – Harimao
- Hell Girl (2009) – Suzumi Matsuda
- We Without Wings (2011) – Alice
- Humanity Has Declined (2012) – Fairy
- Da Capo III (2013) – Shiki Edogawa, Minatsu Amakase
- The Disappearance of Nagato Yuki-chan (2015) – Kyon's sister

=== Original video animation (OVA) ===
- Raimuiro Senkitan: The South Island Dream Romantic Adventure (2004) – Kinu Fukushima, Theme Song Performance
- Saishū Shiken Kujira (2008) – Sae Nagumo

=== Theatrical animation ===
- The Disappearance of Haruhi Suzumiya (2010) – Kyon's sister

=== Original net animation (ONA) ===
- Saishū Shiken Kujira (2007) – Sae Nagumo

=== Video games ===
- Crescendo (2001) – Miyu Shizuhara
- Raimuiro Senkitan (2002) – Kinu Fukushima
- Wind: A Breath of Heart (2002) – Wakaba Fujimiya
- Sonic the Hedgehog series (2003–present) – Cream the Rabbit
  - Sonic Battle (2003)
  - Sonic Heroes (2003)
  - Sonic Advance 3 (2004)
  - Shadow the Hedgehog (2005)
  - Sonic Riders (2006)
  - Sonic and the Secret Rings (2007)
  - Mario & Sonic at the Olympic Games (2007)
  - Sonic Riders: Zero Gravity (2008)
  - Mario & Sonic at the Olympic Winter Games (2009, Nintendo DS version)
  - Sonic Free Riders (2010)
  - Sonic Colors (2010, Nintendo DS version)
  - Sonic Generations (2011)
  - Mario & Sonic at the London 2012 Olympic Games (2011)
  - Sonic Racing: CrossWorlds (2025)
- Summer Radish Vacation (2003) - Rina Inou
- Shuffle! (2004) Lisianthus
- Summer Radish Vacation 2 (2004) - Rika Inou
- Super Robot Wars series (2004-current) - Yoko Kuriki (Cookie)
  - Super Robot Wars GC (2004)
  - Super Robot Wars Operation Extend (2013)
- Nanatsuiro Drops Pure!! (2007) – Yayoi Amenomori
- Nettai Teikiatsu Shoujo (2007) – Tomoe Arashiyama
- Quilt (2007) – Kanami
- Summon Night: Twin Age (2007) – Ain
- Suzunone Seven! (2010) – Sumire Daikanyama
- Sakura Momoko Gekijyo:Coji Coji – (xxxx) Coji Coji
- Family Project (xxxx) – Wang Chunhua/Takayashiki Haruka
- Suigetsu (xxxx) – Maria Kosaka

== Discography ==
- "Cold Flowers" (凛花, "Rinka") released on December 25, 2002, and ranked 131st in Oricon singles charts.
- "Kinu Fukushima" (福島絹) image song album of the eponymous character released on May 28, 2003.
