= Daisuke Hirakawa =

Japanese voice actor (born 1973)

- 平川 大輔
- Born: June 4, 1973 (age 53); Niigata Prefecture, Japan
- Occupation: Voice actor
- Years active: 1997–present
- Known for: Orlando Bloom's official Japanese voice actor
- Notable credits: Itazura na Kiss as Naoki Irie; School Days as Makoto Itō; Dinosaur King as Seth; Demon Slayer: Kimetsu no Yaiba the Movie: Mugen Train as Enmu; Omamori Himari as Yuto Amakawa; Free! as Rei Ryugazaki; JoJo's Bizarre Adventure: Stardust Crusaders as Noriaki Kakyoin; Noblesse as Frankenstein; Diabolik Lovers as Laito Sakamaki

Daisuke Hirakawa (平川 大輔, Hirakawa Daisuke; born 4 June 1973) is a Japanese voice actor and currently active as a freelancer. He is the official Japanese voice actor for Orlando Bloom.

== Career ==
He has done Japanese voice-overs for two of Orlando Bloom's characters, Will Turner from Pirates of the Caribbean and Kingdom Hearts II, and Legolas from The Lord of the Rings film trilogy.

== Filmography ==
=== TV anime ===
2001

- Grappler Baki: Maximum Tournament, Kohei Hatanaka

2003

- Papuwa, Tōhoku Miyagi, Hayashi

2004

- Gankutsuou, Baron Franz d'Épinay
- BECK: Mongolian Chop Squad, Yūsuke Shīki

2005

- Eyeshield 21, Hayato Akaba
- Jinki: Extend, Hiroshi Kawamoto
- Transformers: Cybertron, Excilion, Exgeiser
- Shuffle!, Masanori Takizawa
- Idaten Jump, Seiya Kanzaki

2006

- School Rumble: Second Semester, Kazuya Tanaka
- Otogi-Jūshi Akazukin, Hansel
- Chocotto Sister, Haruma Kawagoe
- Kekkaishi, Kimiya Hachiōji

2007

- School Days, Makoto Ito present
- The Familiar of Zero: Knight of the Twin Moons, Julio Cesare

2008

- Dinosaur King, Seth present
- Itazura na Kiss, Naoki Irie
- Rin ~Daughters of Mnemosyne~, Teruki Maeno
- Naruto Shippuden, Sora
- The Familiar of Zero: Rondo of Princesses, Julio Cesare

2009

- Shangri-La, Sōichirō Hata
- Bleach, Senbonzakura (Zanpakutou Arc), Harunobu Ogido
- Pocket Monsters Diamond & Pearl, O

2010

- Omamori Himari, Yūto Amakawa present
- SD Gundam Sangokuden Brave Battle Warriors, Shuuyu Hyakushiki, Reitei Gundam
- Hyakka Ryōran, Yagyuu Muneakira
- Detective Conan, Unpei Terado
- Highschool of the dead, Tajima

2011

- Horizon in the Middle of Nowhere, Noriki, Nenji
- Starry Sky, Aozora Hayato
- Yu-Gi-Oh! Zexal, Charlie McCoy
- Alice in the Country of Hearts, Ace
- Beelzebub, Ichiro 'Alex Rodriguez' Shinjo
- No. 6, Yamase
- Naruto Shippuden, Sora

2012

- Beelzebub, O'Donnell
- Hidamari Sketch × Honeycomb, Julie
- Hiiro no Kakera, Suguru Ohmi
- Shirokuma Cafe, Gentoo Penguin
- Space Battleship Yamato 2199, Hiroki Shinohara
- Zero no Tsukaima F, Julio Cesare

2013

- Brothers Conflict, Ukyo Asahina
- Diabolik Lovers, Laito Sakamaki
- Free! - Iwatobi Swim Club, Rei Ryugazaki
- Karneval, Akari
- Yu-Gi-Oh! ZEXAL II, Durbe
- Alice in the Country of Hearts, Ace

2014

- Ace of Diamond, Tsubasa Hirai
- Aikatsu!, Shun Yotsuba
- Ao Haru Ride, Yōichi Tanaka
- Free! Eternal Summer, Rei Ryugazaki
- Hōzuki no Reitetsu, Momotaro
- JoJo's Bizarre Adventure: Stardust Crusaders (Tarot Arc), Noriaki Kakyoin
- Love Stage!!, Rei Sagara
- Hybrid Child, Hazuki

2015

- Aldnoah.Zero 2, Harklight
- Beautiful Bones: Sakurako's Investigation, Takeshi Fujioka
- Dance with Devils, Shiki Natsumezaka
- Diabolik Lovers: More, Blood, Laito Sakamaki
- My Monster Secret, Kanade Okada
- JoJo's Bizarre Adventure: Stardust Crusaders (Egypt Arc), Noriaki Kakyoin
- Kamisama Kiss 2, Suiro
- Log Horizon 2, Elias Hackblade
- Seraph of the End: Battle in Nagoya, Shusaku Iwasaki
- Star-Myu, Tsubasa Hiragi
- The Testament of Sister New Devil, Kyōichi Shiba

2016

- Prince of Stride: Alternative, Shizuma Mayuzumi
- Aikatsu Stars!, Hikaru Moroboshi
- Ajin: Demi-Human, Kōji Tanaka
- Mobile Suit Gundam: Iron-Blooded Orphans, Savarin Canule
- Handa-kun, Sōichi Nagamasa
- Berserk, Jerome
- Nobunaga no Shinobi, Takenaka Hanbei
- Magic-kyun! Renaissance, Shinra Ichijōji
- Izetta: The Last Witch, Elliot
- Cute High Earth Defense Club LOVE! LOVE!, Entarō Meguriya

2017

- Fuuka, Hisashi
- Star-Myu: High School Star Musical 2, Tsubasa Hiragi
- Code:Realize ~Sousei no Himegimi~, Count Saint-Germain
- The Silver Guardian, Eeyuu
- Kirakira PreCure a la Mode, Elisio
- Clean Freak! Aoyama-kun, Ryō Kadomatsu
- Altair: A Record of Battles, Carvajal
- Is It Wrong to Try to Pick Up Girls in a Dungeon?: Sword Oratoria, Albert Waldstein

2018

- Hakata Tonkotsu Ramens, Saeki
- Hakyuu Houshin Engi, Taiitsu Shinjin
- Aikatsu Friends!, Ken Mayuzumi
- Devils' Line, Ryūnosuke Katagiri
- Free! Dive to the Future, Rei Ryugazaki

2019

- Domestic Girlfriend, Shū Hagiwara
- Bungo Stray Dogs 3, T.J. Eckleberg
- To the Abandoned Sacred Beasts, John William Bancroft (Dragon)
- The Case Files of Lord El-Melloi II: Rail Zeppelin Grace Note, Melvin Waynes
- Val × Love, Tooru Inukai
- Namu Amida Butsu!: Rendai Utena, Amida Nyorai
- Demon Slayer: Kimetsu no Yaiba, Enmu
- The Ones Within, Nanami Omejima

2020

- ID: Invaded, Pyrotechnician/Koji Huyukawa
- Great Pretender, Thomas Meyer
- Mr Love: Queen's Choice, Simon (Lucien)
- Noblesse, Frankenstein
- The Gymnastics Samurai, Naohiko Nakanomori

2021

- I-Chu: Halfway Through the Idol, Raku Wakaoji
- Cells at Work! Code Black, Brain Cell (Command)
- Oshiete Hokusai!: The Animation, Kanō Eitoku
- Dragon Goes House-Hunting, White Mage
- Kingdom Season 3, Keisha
- Peach Boy Riverside, Sumeragi
- Platinum End, Metroblue

2022

- Eternal Boys, Kentarō Sanada

2023

- By the Grace of the Gods Season 2, Prenance
- Revenger, Liu
- Helck, Mikaros
- The Demon Sword Master of Excalibur Academy, Demon Lord Leonis
- Frieren, Sein's older brother

2024

- Solo Leveling, Choi Jong-in
- Haigakura, Sōkōmei
- TsumaSho, Keisuke Niijima

2025

- Blue Miburo, Anegakōji Kintomo
- Miru: Paths to My Future, Professor, Toshi/Drunk Man
- Pass the Monster Meat, Milady!, Zeff Senjin
- A Wild Last Boss Appeared!, Merak

2026

- Scum of the Brave, Ongakuya Ishinō
- Snowball Earth, Yukio
- Sparks of Tomorrow, Izo Masubuchi

2027

- Inherit the Winds, Niimi Nishiki

TBA

- Junket Bank, Reiji Murasame

=== Original video animation (OVA) ===
- Hunter × Hunter: Greed Island (2003), Abengane
- Hunter × Hunter: G.I. Final (2004), Abengane
- School Days: Valentine Days (2008), Makoto Ito
- Magical Heart Kokoro-chan (2008), Makoto Ito
- Megane na Kanojo (2010), Takashi Miyaguchi
- Saint Seiya: The Lost Canvas (2011), Aquarius Dégel
- Kono Danshi Uchuu-jin to Tatakaemasu (2012), Shiro
- Nozoki Ana (2013), Tatsuhiko Kido
- Hybrid Child (2014), Hazuki
- Kono Danshi, Sekika ni Nayandemasu (2014), Kouya Onihara
- Diabolik Lovers (2015), Laito Sakamaki
- Noblesse (manhwa) (2016), Frankenstein
- Code Geass: Rozé of the Recapture (2024), Stanley

=== Theatrical animation ===
- The Sky Crawlers (2008), Aizu Yudagawa
- The Mystical Laws (2012)
- Tiger & Bunny: The Rising (2014), Andrew Scott/Virgil Dingfelder
- Ajin Part 1: Shōdō (2015), Kōji Tanaka
- Dance with Devils: Fortuna (2017), Shiki Natsumezaka
- Free! -Take Your Marks- (2017), Rei Ryugazaki
- Infini-T Force (2018)
- The Legend of the Galactic Heroes: Die Neue These Seiran (2019), Bernhard von Schneider
- Demon Slayer: Kimetsu no Yaiba the Movie: Infinity Train (2020), Enmu
- Free! The Final Stroke Part 1 (2021), Rei Ryugazaki
- Bright: Samurai Soul (2021), Raiden
- Free! The Final Stroke Part 2 (2022), Rei Ryugazaki

=== Web animation ===
- Mobile Suit Gundam Thunderbolt (2015), Cornelius Kaka
- Bastard!! Season 2 (2023), Ran Di Rhodes Stein Neubauten

=== Video games ===
- Akane-sasu Sekai de Kimi to Utau (2017) - Edogawa Ranpo
- Arknights (2019) - Courier
- Assassin's Creed Syndicate - Jacob Frye
- AICHUU! - Raku Wakaouji
- Ayakashi koi gikyoku - K-suke
- BlackStar - Theatre Starless - (2019), Kasumi
- Borderlands 2, Roland (Japanese dub)
- Brothers Conflict: Brilliant Blue (2013), Ukyo Asahina
- Brothers Conflict: Passion Pink (2012), Ukyo Asahina
- Code:Realize ~Sousei no Himegimi~ (2014), Saint Germain
- Cross Days, Makoto Ito (credited as Tatsuya Hirai)
- Danball Senki W, Kirito Kazama
- Detective Pikachu, Hiro Morgan
- Diabolik Lovers: Haunted Dark Bridal (2012), Laito Sakamaki
- Diabolik Lovers: More Blood (2013), Laito Sakamaki
- Diabolik Lovers: Vandead Carnival (2014), Laito Sakamaki
- Diabolik Lovers: Dark Fate (2015), Laito Sakamaki
- Disgaea D2: A Brighter Darkness, Xenolith
- Garnet Cradle (2009), Sakurazawa Kiichirou
- Heart no Kuni no Alice ~Wonderful Wonder World, Ace-Knight of Heart
- Hiiro no Kakera, Suguru Oomi
- Honkai: Star Rail, Sampo Koski
- Ikemen Vampire (2017), William Shakespeare
- Ijiwaru my Master (2008), Shirosaki Homura
- JoJo's Bizarre Adventure: All Star Battle R (2022), Noriaki Kakyoin
- JoJo's Bizarre Adventure: Eyes of Heaven (2015), Noriaki Kakyoin
- JoJo's Bizarre Adventure: Last Survivor (2019), Noriaki Kakyoin
- Kichiku Megane (2007), Saeki Katsuya
- Kichiku Megane R, Saeki Katsuya
- Kingdom Hearts II (2005), Will Turner
- Kingdom Hearts 3D: Dream Drop Distance (2012), Sam Flynn
- The Legend of Heroes: Trails from Zero (2010), Cao Lee
- The Legend of Heroes: Trails into Reverie (2020), Rufus Albarea
- The Legend of Heroes: Trails of Cold Steel (2013), Rufus Albarea
- The Legend of Heroes: Trails of Cold Steel II (2014), Rufus Albarea / Cao Lee
- The Legend of Heroes: Trails of Cold Steel III (2017), Rufus Albarea
- The Legend of Heroes: Trails of Cold Steel IV (2018), Rufus Albarea / Cao Lee
- The Legend of Heroes: Trails to Azure (2011), Cao Lee
- The Legend of Heroes: Trails Through Daybreak II (2022), Cao Lee
- Lucky Dog 1, Ivan Fiore
- Maid Hajimemashita ~Goshujin-sama no Osewa Itashimasu~, Tsuda Keiichi
- Marvel Tōkon: Fighting Souls (2026) - Loki
- Mr Love: Queen's Choice (2019) - Lucien / Xumo / Simon
- Neo Angelique (2008), Bernard
- Omerta ~Chinmoku no okite~, Ruka Belini
- Onmyōji (2017), Susabi
- On Air! (2018), Rei Shirayuki
- Otometeki Koi Kakumei Love Revo!! (2010), Takashi Sakuragawa
- Period Cube ~Torikago no Amadeus~ (2016), Zain
- Punishing: Gray Raven (2019), Chrome
- Sdorica (2020), Juan Yun
- School Days (2005), Makoto Ito (credited as Tatsuya Hirai)
- Shokumonogatari, Meng Po Tang
- Shuuen no Virche -ErroR:Salvation- (2021), Lucas Proust
- Summer Days (2006), Makoto Ito (credited as Tatsuya Hirai)
- Super Robot Wars Z (2008), The Edel Bernal
- Super Robot Wars Z3: Tengoku-Hen (2015), AG
- TAISHO x ALICE, Cinderella
- Tales of Breaker (2005), Yuteki and Sauber
- The King of Fighters for Girls (2019), Nagi
- Togainu no Chi, Kazui
- Yakuza: Like a Dragon, Sota Kume
- Zettai Meikyuu Grimm (2010), Wilhelm Grimm

=== Drama CDs ===
- Ai no Kotoba mo Shiranaide (2008), Shougo Kaji
- Aishiteru (Youko Fujitani) (2008), Aiha Harutomo
- Akanai Tobira (2008), Tachibana
- Alterna (Orutana) (2009), Keisuke Takeo
- Ambassador wa Yoru ni Sasayaku (2009), Boyer
- Boukun no Kajou na Aijou (2004), Makoto Tooyama
- Code:Realize ~Sousei no Himegimi~ as Saint-Germain
- Daisukes, Kurokawa Daisuke
- Danna Catalogue, Kanbe Hitoshi
- Dash!, Akimoto
- Diabolik Lovers, Sakamaki Laito
- Gisou Renai no Susume (2007), Maki Ashihara
- Goshujinsama to Inu (2008/2009), Chiharu Asada
- Haiyore! Nyarko-san (2009), Nyarto
- Hanakage ~Ochita Mitsuka~, Hugh Glenn
- Hitorijime Theory (2009), Nishioka
- I LOVE PET! vol. 7, Shepherd Dog, Sousuke
- Secret Eye (2009), Shirosaki Homura
- Iro Otoko ~Kyoudai Hen~ (2008)
- Jain no Chi (2007), Takaaki Kadono
- Jooubachi no Kanbinaru Kougou, Hakuou
- Junk!Boys (2006), Tsukasa Sakuma
- Kageki series 5: Kageki ni Tengoku, Ragunoru
- Katekyo! (2009), Kaede Sumizome
- Kichiku Megane Souchaku Ban (2007), Saeki Katsuya
- Kichiku Megane Hisouchaku Ban, Saeki Katsuya
- Koi no Shizuku (2008), Reiji Takase
- Konna Otoko wa Aisareru (2008), Shougo Kaji
- Kotonoha no Hana Series 2: Kotonoha no Sekai (2011), Yukitaka Fujino
- Koisuru Boukun, Hiroto
- Kuroi Aijou (2007), Tomonori Fushimi
- Mede Shireru Yoru no Junjou, Kichou
- Oz to Himitsu no Ai (2014), Haruto
- Period Cube (2015), Zain
- Reload (2008)
- Repeat After Me? (2009), Atsushi Imai
- Risou no Koibito (2013), Yoshimi Kosaka
- Sanbyaku nen no Koi no Hate (2009), Hiyou
- Saudade (2007), Robert Blanca Serrano
- Shukan Soine, Kakeru
- Slaver Series, Tsukui
- Spirits Tea (2007), Kayama Kyohei
- Stray Sheep (Satoshi Kagami), Seiji Tachibana
- Tsumitsukuri na Kimi (2006), Yuzuki
- Yandere Heaven Black Series 1: Seishin Gakuen Boys Dormitory (2012), Masato Nabari
- Yuiga Dokuson na Otoko, Toshikazu Oki
- Yuuutsu na Asa (2010/2011), Tomoyuki Katsuragi
- Yume Miru Seiza (2008), Kuze in Yume Miru Seiza (The Constellation Shine in the Sky)/ Kensuke Yamaguchi in Saredo Utsukushiki Hibi (Beautiful Days)
- Ze, Himi

=== Dubbing ===
==== Voice-doubles ====
- Orlando Bloom
  - Black Hawk Down (2004 TV Tokyo edition), PFC Todd Blackburn
  - The Lord of the Rings: The Fellowship of the Ring, Legolas
  - The Lord of the Rings: The Two Towers, Legolas
  - The Lord of the Rings: The Return of the King, Legolas
  - Pirates of the Caribbean: The Curse of the Black Pearl, Will Turner
  - Haven, Shy
  - Troy, Paris
  - Elizabethtown, Drew Baylor
  - Pirates of the Caribbean: Dead Man's Chest, Will Turner
  - Pirates of the Caribbean: At World's End, Will Turner
  - The Good Doctor, Dr. Martin E. Blake
  - The Three Musketeers (2012 TV Asashi edition), Duke of Buckingham
  - The Hobbit: The Desolation of Smaug, Legolas
  - Zulu, Brian Epkeen
  - The Hobbit: The Battle of the Five Armies, Legolas
  - Digging for Fire, Ben
  - Pirates of the Caribbean: Dead Men Tell No Tales, Will Turner
  - S.M.A.R.T. Chase, Danny Stratton
  - Unlocked, Jack Alcott
- Tom Hiddleston
  - Thor, Loki
  - The Avengers, Loki
  - Thor: The Dark World, Loki
  - Crimson Peak, Sir Thomas Sharpe
  - High-Rise, Dr. Robert Laing
  - Thor: Ragnarok, Loki
  - Avengers: Infinity War, Loki
  - Avengers: Endgame, Loki
  - What If...?, Loki
  - Loki, Loki
  - The Simpsons: Welcome to the Club, Loki
  - Avengers: Doomsday, Loki
- Jang Keun-suk
  - You're Beautiful, Hwang Tae Kyung
  - Mary Stayed Out All Night, Kang Mu-gyul
  - You're My Pet, Kang In-ho
  - Love Rain, Seo In-ha
  - Pretty Man, Dokgo Ma-te

==== Live-action ====
- 13, Vincent "Vince" Ferro (Sam Riley)
- Aladdin, Prince Anders (Billy Magnussen)
- Austin Powers in Goldmember, Austin Powers (young) (Aaron Himelstein)
- Before Sunset, Journalist #2 (Rodolphe Pauly)
- Boardwalk Empire episode "Blue Bell Boy", Rowland Smith (Nick Robinson)
- Borderlands, Roland Greaves (Kevin Hart)
- Bram Stoker's Dracula (15th Anniversary Edition), Jonathan Harker (Keanu Reeves)
- City by the Sea, Dave Simon (Anson Mount)
- Clash of the Titans, Eusebios (Nicholas Hoult)
- The Closet, Kyung-hoon (Kim Nam-gil)
- Cowboys & Aliens, Percy Dolarhyde (Paul Dano)
- The Darkest Hour, Ben (Max Minghella)
- The Day the Earth Stopped, Man (Bug Hall)
- Dawn of the Dead, Bart (Michael Barry)
- DOA: Dead or Alive, Ryu Hayabusa (Kane Kosugi)
- El tiempo entre costuras, Ignacio (Raúl Arévalo)
- Emily Owens, M.D., Will Collins (Justin Hartley)
- Euphoria, Tyler (Lukas Gage)
- Final Destination 2, Evan Lewis (David Paetkau)
- Firestorm, Goofy (Terence Yin)
- Flight 29 Down, Eric McGorrill (Jeremy Kissner)
- The Greatest Game Ever Played, Francis Ouimet (Shia LaBeouf)
- Ground Control (2008 DVD edition), Cruise (Robert Sean Leonard)
- The Grudge 2, Eason (Edison Chen)
- Hamlet, Guildenstern (Dechen Thurman)
- Hawking, Stephen Hawking (Benedict Cumberbatch)
- He Got Game, Lonnie (John Wallace)
- Herbie: Fully Loaded, Kevin (Justin Long)
- Hercules, Iolaus (Reece Ritchie)
- His Dark Materials, Lord Asriel Belacqua (James McAvoy)
- The Hot Zone, Dr. Peter Jahrling (Topher Grace)
- How to Get Away with Murder, Connor Walsh (Jack Falahee)
- The Human Centipede (First Sequence), Detective Voller (Peter Blankenstein)
- In Time (2025 BS10 Star Channel edition), Philippe Weis (Vincent Kartheiser)
- Invincible, Paul Beck (Myles Pollard)
- It Chapter Two, Stanley Uris (Andy Bean)
- JAG, Petty Officer Jason Tiner (Chuck Carrington)
- John Q., Mitch Quigley (Shawn Hatosy)
- Jupiter Ascending, Balem Abrasax (Eddie Redmayne)
- Killerman, Moe Diamond (Liam Hemsworth)
- Knight and Day, Simon Feck (Paul Dano)
- Labor Day, Henry Wheeler (older)/Narrator (Tobey Maguire)
- Lara Croft Tomb Raider: The Cradle of Life, Xien (Terence Yin)
- The Last Station, Valentin Fedorovich Bulgakov (James McAvoy)
- Leonardo, Jacopo Saltarelli (Kit Clarke)
- Legends of the Fall, Samuel Ludlow (Henry Thomas)
- Lost Boys: The Tribe, Chris Emerson (Tad Hilgenbrink)
- Marie Antoinette, Axel von Fersen (Jamie Dornan)
- My Blind Date with Life, Saliya Kahawatte (Kostja Ullmann)
- New Police Story, Fire (Terence Yin)
- The O.C., Zach Stevens (Michael Cassidy)
- Office Killer, Brian (Eddie Malavarca)
- One Fine Day, Park Tae-won (Yoo Ha-joon)
- One Tree Hill, Nathan Scott (James Lafferty)
- Oslo, Terje Rød-Larsen (Andrew Scott)
- Outlander, Ian Murray (Steven Cree)
- Penny Dreadful, Dorian Gray (Reeve Carney)
- Phil of the Future, Phil Diffy (Ricky Ullman)
- The Quiet American, Joe Tunney (Robert Stanton)
- The Rite, Michael Kovak (Colin O'Donoghue)
- The Rules of Attraction, Paul Denton (Ian Somerhalder)
- Saw II, Daniel Matthews (Erik Knudsen)
- Scream 4, Charlie Walker (Rory Culkin)
- Snow White, Bashful (Tituss Burgess)
- State of Play, Dan Foster (James McAvoy)
- Super Pumped, Travis Kalanick (Joseph Gordon-Levitt)
- Swiss Army Man, Hank Thompson (Paul Dano)
- T-34, Nikolay Ivushkin (Alexander Petrov)
- Tron: Legacy, Sam Flynn (Garrett Hedlund)
- Tru Calling, Harrison Davies (Shawn Reaves)
- Veronica Mars, Stosh "Piz" Piznarski (Chris Lowell)
- The Village, Finton Coin (Michael Pitt)
- The Villainess, Lee Joong-sang (Shin Ha-kyun)
- The Walk, Jean-Louis (Clément Sibony)
- Wall Street: Money Never Sleeps, Jacob "Jake" Moore (Shia LaBeouf)
- We Were Soldiers, 2nd Lieutenant Jack Geoghegan (Chris Klein)
- Wedding Crashers, Todd Cleary (Keir O'Donnell)
- Withnail and I (2014 Blu-ray and DVD editions), "...& I" (Paul McGann)
- X Company, Alfred Graves (Jack Laskey)

==== Animation ====
- Frankenweenie, Edward Frankenstein
- The Last Summoner, Huanxin
- Peppa Pig as Narrator
- The Snow Queen 3: Fire and Ice, Rollan
