= Island Days =

2014 video game

- Cover art
- Developers: Klon, Overflow
- Publisher: Klon
- Series: School Days
- Platform: Nintendo 3DS
- Release: JP: July 3, 2014
- Genres: Visual novel, Tower defense
- Mode: Single-player

Island Days is a tower defense visual novel video game developed by Klon in collaboration with Overflow for the Nintendo 3DS. It is a spin-off of Overflow's School Days visual novel series, and was released in Japan on July 3, 2014.

== Gameplay ==
The game is split into two main parts, story and battle.

The story part follows a typical visual novel structure, in which the protagonist, Makoto, interacts with the various female characters and builds relationships with them.

The battle part is a tower defense game, in which Makoto and the girls must protect their food supply from wild animals. The player chooses the characters to accompany Makoto into battles; they lose some health from being selected. As per many visual novels, the plot can take various courses based on the player's actions, such as who Makoto romantically pursues, or potential deaths among the characters.

== Plot ==
The story follows Makoto Itou, a high school student who becomes stranded on a remote island alongside various female students during spring break. Over the course of the narrative, Makoto and the others attempt to leave the island, gather food and strengthen their bonds. The heroines featured are Sekai Saionji, Kotonoha Katsura, Kokoro Katsura, Setsuna Kiyoura, Otome Kato, Karen Kato, Hikari Kuroda, and Ai Yamagata. Each has their own ending.

== Development and release ==
Island Days was developed by Klon alongside Overflow. It was released for the Nintendo 3DS on July 3, 2014.

The opening theme is "Paradise (Past Plus Parallel)" by Kyōko Aihara.

== Reception ==
Famitsu gave the game a score of 22 out of 40.
