= OFL =

OFL may stand for :

- Off-line
- Office of Federal Lending, office of the US Department of the Treasury
- Office of the First Lady of the United States
- Ontario Federation of Labour, a Canadian trade union centre
- SIL Open Font License by SIL International
- Overfishing level
- Overflow (disambiguation)
