= Overspill (disambiguation) =

Overspill is a widely used proof technique in nonstandard analysis.

Overspill may also refer to:

- Overspill estate, housing for relocated inner-city residents
- Overspill parking, parking of vehicles outside designated areas
- Signal overspill, reception of broadcast signals outside a target area

== See also ==
- Overflow
