= Cross Days =

2010 video game

- Cover of Cross Days (DVD Version)
- Genre: Drama; Erotica; Harem; Slice of life; Romance
- Video game
- Developer: 0verflow
- Publisher: Stack (Windows); AiCherry (DVD); PalaceGame (PSP)
- Genre: Visual novel
- Platform: Windows; DVD; PSP
- Released: March 19, 2010 (Windows)
- Audio drama

Radio Cross Days
- Station: Lantis Net Radio
- Original run: January 8, 2009 – March 25, 2010
- Episodes: 64
- Manga
- Written by: Yoko Kagura
- Illustrated by: Homare Sakazuki
- Published by: Kadokawa Shoten
- Magazine: Monthly Comp Ace
- Original run: April 26, 2010 – May 26, 2011
- Volumes: 2
- Related series
- School Days

Cross Days is a Japanese erotic visual novel developed by 0verflow, released on March 19, 2010, for Windows and later ported as a DVD game and for the PlayStation Portable (PSP). The story, a dramatic slice-of-life, follows the life of Yuuki Ashikaga, a high school student who becomes the ambivalent love-interest of two girls during his second term, and the effects this has on himself and his relationships with other characters. Though the game requires little interaction from users, Cross Days engages the player through a nonlinear plot that they are given opportunities to change the course of during play. The game is the third installation of the School Days line of series, succeeding Summer Days.

0verflow announced work on Cross Days in December 2008. From February 2009 to March 2010, the game was postponed a total of six times, going on to perform marginally-well upon release. In the weeks following this, after it was illegally found on peer-to-peer (P2P) networks, a trojan horse disguised as the game was released, publishing the personal information of unknowing users online for public access.

Following the game's release, Cross Days made transitions into other media: a manga was serialized in the Kadokawa Shoten magazine Monthly Comp Ace from April 26 to August 10, 2010; three light novels were published from September 15 to October 29, as was a strategy guide; a radio drama was broadcast during development; and the game's original soundtrack was also published by Lantis from April 24 to July 21.

== Gameplay ==
Cross Days is a visual novel. These are essentially played by watching and listening to episodic sequences of story and then selecting, or ignoring, clickable actions or responses when they are presented to the player. These choices are intricately linked to alternating routes of plot, moderately changing the direction of the story as each is made, ultimately leading to erotic scenes between characters and one of various endings. In the game's yaoi routes, the protagonist crossdresses as a maid and engages in homosexual intercourse.

Like the games before it, Cross Days is presented with limited animation. The game is audibly stereophonic with lip-synched voice acting, sound effects and background music.

== Plot ==
Yuuki Ashikaga is a high school freshman in his second semester at the fictional Sakakino Academy, who from his regular visits to the library, grows enamored by Kotonoha Katsura, a classmate who also comes to read. Despite being in a relationship, she genuinely reciprocates his interest. However, things become complicated when his sister, Chie, introduces him to Roka Kitsuregawa, a friend of hers. In an attempt to make herself seem harder to get, Roka claims that she is equally interested in Makoto Itou, another schoolmate. Her lie is unsuccessful, as Yuuki, aware that Makoto is Kotonoha's boyfriend, decides to ask her about the affair.

=== Setting ===
Unlike in Summer Days, the story in Cross Days is not rewritten as a spin-off of the original story, but occurs during the events of it, making the game a parallel series to School Days. As such, the undisclosed location of the story remains the same with focus being around the school. All signature characters and their established relationships appear in the game, with six new cast members.

=== Characters ===
Example of a conversation in Cross Days. Here, Roka is talking to Yuuki.

Cross Days follows Yuuki Ashikaga, a bespectacled young lad whose withdrawn school life goes awry when his affection for two girls begins to affect his relationships with his friends and peers. Though unaware of each other, the girls in question constitute the premise of the game: Kotonoha Katsura, a character well known throughout the franchise as the pivotal love-interest of Makoto Itou, and Roka Kitsuregawa, a newcomer whose efforts to make Yuuki jealous only serve to further complicate her relationship with him. Chie Ashikaga, the mildly abusive older sister of Yuuki, and Kyouichi Kasannoin, Nanami Kanroji's boyfriend, having only previously made cameo appearances in the School Days anime, return to make more prominent roles, as does Ai Yamagata, a character last seen from Summer Days. Rounding up the set of the cast are Ion Ishibashi and Kira Youka, a couple of friends who also make first appearances in the game.

== Development ==
News of Cross Days first surfaced in the December 2008 issue of Tech Gian, a magazine published by Enterbrain, on October 21, showing first ever screenshots, reporting on the story and characters, and mentioning that Cross Days would contain 3D animation with a meticulously reworked plot and male protagonist. Also in October, ASCII Media Works and Gakken published articles about the game in their respective issues of Dengeki G's Magazine, Dengeki Hime and Megami Magazine.

Promotion began shortly after. Besides periodically keeping the public informed on development and characters, 0verflow consecutively released downloadable, non-playable benchmarks of the game from November 1, 2008, to May 4, 2009. Company staff attended Dream Party, an anime convention, in Osaka on November 16, 2008, selling Cross Days telephone cards while stores took pre-orders for the game, reportedly filling reservations in days. On December 5, 0verflow announced that a set of USB teledildonics, collectively known as SOM, would be compatible with Cross Days, manufactured by Goods Land. Trial versions of the game, released to about 95 select retailers, were disclosed by 0verflow on December 26 and at Comiket 75.

On January 8, 2009, 0verflow announced that starting that day, Lantis would be airing a weekly, episodic internet radio drama of the game's characters, titled Radio Cross Days. Broadcasts were made regularly on Thursdays, finishing up on March 25, 2010, with 64 sessions aired.

Cross Days was originally scheduled to come out on February 27, 2009, but its release was postponed six times: to April 24, June 26, November 20, December 18, January 29, 2010, and to March 19, 2010, when it finally came out. The much-anticipated game was released to several promotional campaigns, many of which were intercity screening venues that spanned operation from March 5 to 14.

=== Release history ===
On March 29, 2010, 0verflow announced that an outdated DLL had been released with retail versions of the game. A 372 KB replacement was provided via download. The following day another patch was released to bring copies of the game up to version 1.00a.

Cross Days was ported to two other platforms. AiCherry, an interactive movie developer, re-released Cross Days as a DVD game on April 28, 2011, as did PalaceGame, a UMD publisher, for the PlayStation Portable (PSP) on July 29, 2011.

=== Trojan scare ===
On April 15, 2010, roughly a month after Cross Days was released, BBC News reported on the spread of a virus named Kenzero masquerading on peer-to-peer (P2P) networks as unlicensed copies of erotic games; one of which, according to software developer SPAMFighter, included Cross Days. Users tricked into installing the virus, termed a form of "ransomware" in the report, were asked for personal information and then had all of their web history posted to a blog, operated by shell corporation Romancing Inc., for public access. NetAgent, a property rights company, reported that at least 5,510 people were collectively infected. Those wishing to have their information removed could do so after acknowledging to viewers that they had attempted to download the game illegally. SPAMfighter has noted that the intrusive nature of the trojan was "in fact explained in [the software's] terms of service".

== Sales ==
Cross Days for Windows premiered as the third most sold game on Getchu.com, a major redistributor of visual novel and domestic anime products, during the month of its release, ranking twelfth for the first half of 2010, and thirty-first for the whole year. The DVD game ranked as the most sold DVDi for the first half of 2011, and forty-seventh most from November 26 to December 27. Cross Days for the PSP additionally ranked as the fifteenth most sold UMD game during that time as well.

== Media ==
=== Manga ===
Based on the story of the game, Cross Days was published into a manga, written by Yoko Kagura and illustrated by Homare Sakazuki. 0verflow announced on April 4, 2010, that it would make its serialization debut in Monthly Comp Ace on April 26. The series was circulated until August 2010, published by Kadokawa Shoten into a first and second volume, released November 20, 2010 and June 22, 2011, respectively.

=== Books and publications ===
In addition to the manga, Cross Days was made into other print. The first of these was a strategy guide and artwork book by Junji Goto, character artist for 0verflow, titled Cross Days Visual Fanbook (ビジュアル・ファンブック, Vijuaru Fanbukku) and published by Kinema Junpousha in August 2010. The subsequent three releases were light novels by different authors but whose cover art was drawn by Goto and illustrated by Jet Yowatari; each book retold the story of the game. Cross Days, a novel, was published by Harvest Books on September 15, written by Mutsuki Mizusaki. Another novel, titled Cross Days ~Kasanaru uso, Kasanaru omoi~ (クロスデイズ ~重なる嘘, 重なる想い~), was released on October 22, 2010, by Shueisha, authored by Hiro Akizuki. The final novel, Cross Days Kitsuregawa Roka no koi no Ruru (Cross Days 喜連川路夏の恋のルール) was written by Yoko Kagura, author of the manga adaption, and was published on October 29 by Kill Time Communication.

=== Audio CDs ===
Cross Days Original Soundtrack

As was the case for School Days and Summer Days, the original soundtrack of Cross Days was reproduced for distribution alongside the game, initially scheduled for February 27, 2009. As this was the first of the later six postponements, however, the album was republished and deferred to June 26. Following the second delay, the soundtrack was held indefinitely until 0verflow announced on April 16, 2010 that it would be released April 21. The album contains all of the game's background music, all of which was composed by HIKO of KIRIKO/HIKO Sound, and theme songs performed by Yozuca*, iyuna, Ceui, Kotaro Odaka and Riryka, totaling 25 tracks.

Original sound track listing
No.	Title	Writer(s)	Length
1.	"First Note" (ファースト・ノート, Fasuto Noto)	KIRIKO	3:48
2.	"One Star" (ひとつ星, Hitotsu Hoshi)	Yozuca*	4:37
3.	"Be There"	iyuna	4:39
4.	"Timeless Melody"	iyuna	4:09
5.	"Eternal Flow"	Ceui, Kotaro Odaka	4:45
6.	"Hourglass" (砂時計, Sunadokei)	Riryka	4:24
7.	"First Note ~Wake Up Ver.~" (ファースト・ノート ～Wake Up Ver.～, Fasuto Noto ～Wake Up Ver.～)		0:59
8.	"An Incident One Day" (ある日の出来事, Aru Hinode Rai Koto)		4:24
9.	"My Favorite Place" (大好きな場所, Daisuki na Basho)		2:49
10.	"Distant Light" (遥かな窓の灯, Haruka na Mado no Tomoshibi)		3:18
11.	"Blue Irritation" (青き焦燥, Aoki Shousou)		2:45
12.	"Beyond the Veil" (ヴェールの向こう, Veru no Mukou)		2:49
13.	"The Lesson is Finished" (授業が終った！, Jugyou ga Otta !)		2:18
14.	"Torn Heart" (破れかけの心, Yabure Kakeno Kokoro)		3:18
15.	"Long Shadows, Reaching Towards You" (長い影、君に届け, Nagai Kage, Kun ni Todoke)		2:48
16.	"The Previous Page" (そのページの先, Sono Peji no Saki)		1:33
17.	"Awkward Touch" (ぎこちないふれあい, Gikochinaifureai)		3:03
18.	"Lying to Myself" (自分への嘘, Jibun Heno Uso)		3:08
19.	"Your Warmth Will Stop Time" (ぬくもりは時を止める, Nukumoriha Toki wo Yameru)		2:01
20.	"Those Who Want to Change the Future" (永遠にもかえがたいもの, Eien Nimokaegataimono)		2:42
21.	"Indeed I Sense Anger" (誠に憤りを感じます, Makotoni Ikidoori wo Kanji Masu)		1:12
22.	"The Claw is Sweet!" (ツメが甘い！, Tsume ga Amai !)		1:20
23.	"The Fact That I Want to Meet You" (君に伝えたい事, Kun ni Tsutae Tai Koto)		3:15
24.	"Let's Summon the Courage to Step Forward" (勇気を出して踏み出そう, Yuuki wo Dashi Te Fumi Daso u)		3:14
25.	"First Note ~Mellow Reprise Ver.~" (ファースト・ノート ～Mellow Reprise Ver.～, Fasuto Noto ~ Mellow Reprise Ver. ~)		1:34
Total length:			73:09

Radio Cross Days, a radio drama broadcast from January 8, 2009, to March 25, 2010, was the second and final set of audio compilations made for the game by Lantis. Released as a first and second disc on June 23 and July 21, 2010, respectively, each album contained thirty-two segments of the broadcast, comprising the sixty-four total that were aired.

=== Merchandise ===
Considerable effort was made to market and promote Cross Days before and after its release, including the sale of brand merchandise. The limited edition of the visual novel came with a figurine of the Kotonoha character, and 0verflow and its partners also sold wall scrolls and Zippo lighters, as well as shower curtains, cushion mousepads, dakimakura cases.
