= School Days (video game) =

2005 Japanese visual novel game by 0verflow

- Second cover of School Days (DVD-ROM)
- Genre: Harem; Romance; Slice of life
- Video game
- Developer: 0verflow (Windows); AiCherry (DVD); Guyzware, Regista (PS2); Ixia (PSP)
- Publisher: 0verflow (Windows); AiCherry (DVD); Interchannel (PS2); PalaceGame (PSP)
- Genre: Eroge (Windows); Visual novel
- Platform: Windows; DVD; PS2; PSP
- Released: JP: April 28, 2005; JP: October 8, 2010 (HQ); NA: June 27, 2012 (HQ); JP: December 19, 2025 (Remastered)
- Manga
- Written by: 0verflow
- Illustrated by: Homare Sakazuki
- Published by: Kadokawa Shoten
- Magazine: Comp Ace
- Original run: May 26, 2006 – September 26, 2007
- Volumes: 2
- Audio drama

Radio School Days
- Studio: TNK
- Station: Lantis Net Radio
- Original run: June 26, 2007 – March 28, 2008
- Episodes: 39
- Anime television series
- Directed by: Keitaro Motonaga
- Produced by: Katsumi Koike; Makoto Ito; Masanori Goto
- Written by: Makoto Uezu
- Music by: Kaoru Okubo
- Studio: TNK
- Licensed by: NA: Discotek Media
- Original network: TV Kanagawa, Chiba TV, TV Aichi, TV Osaka, TV Saitama, AT-X
- Original run: July 3, 2007 – September 27, 2007
- Episodes: 12
- Original video animation

Valentine Days
- Directed by: Keitaro Motonaga
- Written by: Makoto Uezu
- Music by: Kaoru Okubo
- Studio: TNK
- Released: January 17, 2008
- Runtime: 19 minutes
- Original video animation

Magical Heart Kokoro-chan
- Directed by: Keitaro Motonaga
- Written by: Makoto Uezu
- Music by: Kaoru Okubo
- Studio: TNK
- Licensed by: NA: Discotek Media
- Released: March 26, 2008
- Runtime: 25 minutes

School Days is a Japanese slice-of-life eroge visual novel game developed by 0verflow, released in April 2005, for Windows. It was later remade as a DVD game and ported to PlayStation 2 (PS2) and PlayStation Portable (PSP). The story follows Makoto Itou, a high school student who becomes the love interest of several girls during his second term. School Days has multiple endings depending on the player's choices. Some of these endings later became notorious for their graphic violence.

0verflow announced work on School Days in October 2004 and marketed it by showing off the game's innovative use of animated cutscenes and voice-acting. Following its success, 0verflow produced multiple sequels, including a spin-off of the original story called Summer Days, a parallel story called Cross Days. Klon developed the spin-off Island Days for the Nintendo 3DS. A School Days remaster, School Days HQ, was released in October 2010, and localized in North America in June 2012. The original game became unavailable for purchase after April 2011.

Following the game's release, School Days was adapted into different media. A manga adaptation was serialized in the Kadokawa Shoten magazine Comp Ace and it was later published into two volumes. Comic anthologies, light novels and art books were also published, as were audio dramas and several albums of music. An animated television series, two direct-to-video (OVA) single releases and a concert film were also produced, the first of which became a precursor for an internet meme when its finale was pulled from broadcast.

== Gameplay ==
Example of a selection screen from the North American release of School Days HQ. Here, Kotonoha has asked Makoto a question. Players may choose one of the available options or none at all.

School Days follows the typical visual novel gameplay format of scenes interspersed with player choice. These choices determine plot and romantic outcomes, as the game keeps track of the protagonist's relationships with his love interests. The game has pornographic elements. Although the characters' H-scenes are pixelated in the original Japanese releases, the Western release of School Days HQ is not censored. The Playstation 2 and PSP ports do not contain these scenes.

Player choices can result in either 'good' or 'bad' endings. The bad endings of School Days, in which characters die, have become the most notable part of the game. Many of these endings feature the character Kotonoha Katsura either dying or killing other characters. The good endings, by contrast, show the characters having normal relationships, and frequently have erotic elements. Different endings portray the protagonist in relationships with different combinations of his love interests.

Unlike traditional visual novels that consist of static characters with subtitled dialogue, School Days was unusual for its time in that it incorporated animation and voice acting. Cinematics naturally play on their own, and players are afforded the ability to pause, fast-forward, and even skip those they've seen before. Male and female voices can be muted, subtitles can be turned on or off and the game can be played from a window or full-screen ratio. Progress can be saved at any time in up to 100 slots and loaded from either the main menu or during play.

== Plot ==
School Days focuses on the life of Makoto Itō, a first-year high school student living with his divorced mother in the fictional city of Haramihama. During his second term, he becomes infatuated with Kotonoha Katsura, a shy schoolgirl who commutes to and from school by train. When the classroom seating plan of his class is rearranged, Makoto meets with Sekai Saionji, an upbeat girl who becomes invested in his relationship with Kotonoha. However, Sekai becomes jealous of the new couple, having developed feelings for Makoto herself.

== Characters ==
=== Main characters ===
Makoto Itou (伊藤 誠, Itō Makoto)
Voiced by: Daisuke Hirakawa (credited as Tatsuya Hirai in the PC game) (Japanese); P. M. Seymour (English) (Remastered)
Makoto is the protagonist of the School Days visual novel and its adaptations, a generally mild-mannered, composed student in year one (10th grade), class three, whose life becomes complicated when Sekai Saionji sets him up with Kotonoha Katsura and he gets into a love triangle.
Kotonoha Katsura (桂 言葉, Katsura Kotonoha)
Voiced by: Tae Okajima (credited as Soyogi Tonō in the PC game) (Japanese); Katelyn Barr (English) (Remastered)
Shy and reserved, Kotonoha is a student in year one, class four who is on the student council and serves as one of the most pivotal characters in the story. A sweet girly-girl and noticeably well-endowed bookworm, she becomes the initial love interest of Makoto early into their second term.
Sekai Saionji (西園寺 世界, Saionji Sekai)
Voiced by: Shiho Kawaragi (credited as Kaname Yuzuki in the PC game) (Japanese); Brittany Lauda (English) (Remastered)
Sekai Saionji is a student in year one, class three who is the antithesis and foil of Kotonoha. She is interested in Makoto during their first encounter. Despite being an energetic girl, Sekai occasionally shows a more serious side, and when sufficiently frustrated can be loud and selfish.

=== Secondary characters ===
Setsuna Kiyoura (清浦 刹那, Kiyoura Setsuna)
Voiced by: Keiko Imoto (credited as Hana Yamamoto in game) (Japanese); Jalitza Delgado (English) (Remastered)
One of the more inscrutable characters, Setsuna Kiyoura is a keen, focused and habitually tacit girl who tends to have and keep the most level head of her peers when situations go awry, a childhood friend of Sekai and has a crush on Makoto. In Summer Days, where she is the protagonist, Setsuna is shy and timid, in contrast to her more serious portrayal in School Days.
Hikari Kuroda (黒田 光, Kuroda Hikari)
Voiced by: Ryōko Tanaka (credited as Hikaru Isshiki in game) (Japanese); Kayli Mills (English) (Remastered)
High maintenance and fastidious, Hikari Kuroda is a student in year one, class three, recognizable by her signature squid rings hairstyle, her friendship with Sekai, Setsuna and Nanami and crush on Taisuke. She initially believes that Makoto and Sekai are dating from the very start, and tends to negatively generalize him; later growing closer to him herself.
Nanami Kanroji (甘露寺 七海, Kanroji Nanami)
Voiced by: Chiaki Takahashi (credited as Miko Fujimura in game) (Japanese); Bakusatsuho (English) (Remastered)
Nanami Kanroji is a student in year one, class three who is a member of the girls' basketball team, attending the school on an athletic scholarship. A mostly interpersonal character, Nanami is a mature and silent tomboy who generally does not involve herself in the affairs of others and as such remains for the most part unanalyzed as someone who already has a boyfriend and is a good friend of Sekai, Setsuna and Hikari.
Otome Katou (加藤 乙女, Katō Otome)
Voiced by: Haruka Nagami (credited as Yuki Matsunaga in game) (Japanese); Sara Ragsdale (English) (Remastered)
Direct and headstrong, Otome Katou is a student in year one, class four, who like Nanami, is a member of the girls' basketball team. She is usually very intimidating, authoritative to her peers, tolerates nothing but her way and opinion, and does not generally associate with anyone but her trio of friends Minami Obuchi, Natsumi Koizumi and Kumi Mori; who together frequently harass and coerce Kotonoha.
Taisuke Sawanaga (澤永 泰介, Sawanaga Taisuke)
Voiced by: Yoshirō Matsumoto (credited as Hikage Hinata in game) (Japanese); Jesse Inocalla (English) (Remastered)
Taisuke Sawanaga is a student in year one, class three. A spirited, peculiar, perverted and rather hopeless romantic, Taisuke is Makoto's best friend from junior high school who frequently endeavors to forward his otherwise lonely ambitious love life, oblivious to Hikari's feelings for him.
Minami Obuchi (小渕 みなみ, Obuchi Minami)
Voiced by: Minami Kuribayashi (Japanese); Laura Faverty (English) (Remastered)
Minami Obuchi is a student in class four who is the most obedient friend of Otome and bullies Kotonoha.
Natsumi Koizumi (小泉 夏美, Koizumi Natsumi)
Voiced by: Sawa Konohana (games), Nana Furuhara (anime) (Japanese); Tempty (English) (Remastered)
Natsumi Koizumi is a student in class four who is the most informative and interpersonal friend of Otome and bullies Kotonoha.
Kumi Mori (森 来実, Mori Kumi)
Voiced by: Nene (games), Eri Saita (anime) (Japanese); Mint Fantôme (English) (Remastered)
Kumi Mori is a student in class four who is the most puerile, yet politest friend of Otome
Kokoro Katsura (桂 心, Katsura Kokoro)
Voiced by: Megu Ashiro (credited as Aoi Kamitsuki in game) (Japanese); Phoebe Chan (English) (Remastered)
Kokoro Katsura is the sweet-natured younger sister of Kotonoha. Unlike her older sibling, Kokoro is peppy, talkative and full of curiosity, and although she frequently teases Kotonoha, she worries about her greatly.
Itaru Itou (伊藤 止, Itō Itaru)
Voiced by: Kagetsu Nanba (games), Emi Uwagawa (Drama CD vol. 1) (Japanese); Diana Garnet (English) (Remastered)
Wholesome, carefree and overall cheerful, Itaru is the younger sister of Makoto. Separated by the divorce of their parents, she lives under the sole custody of their father, who she does not like, and occasionally sneaks out to come and visit her much-adored older brother.
Youko Saionji (西園寺 踊子, Saionji Yōko)
Voiced by: Aoi Kamizuki (games), Megu Ashiro (anime) (Japanese); Michaela Laws (English) (Remastered)
Youko Saionji, maiden name Inō, is Sekai's mother. Benevolent, knowledgeable, wise and effervescent, Yōko serves to provide advice and guidance to her daughter when necessary, as the restaurateur of Radish with friend, and slight rival, Mai Kiyoura, and helping out her daughter with relationships. She is one of the heroines in Summer Days and Shiny Days.
Manami Katsura (桂 真奈美, Katsura Manami)
Voiced by: Tomoe Suzumi (games), Shiho Hisajima (anime) (Japanese); Gina Galore (English) (Remastered)
Manami Katsura is the biological mother of Kotonoha and Kokoro who makes vocal appearances in the game and anime and a brief appearance in one panel of the manga. She is one of the heroines in Summer Days and Shiny Days and also appears in Cross Days.

== Development ==
School Days was 0verflow's tenth game. School Days was first announced on October 5, 2004, when 0verflow posted links on their official website to both the game's website and the game's dev log. 0verflow revealed in their blog that School Days had been in pre-production for roughly two years and would be a fully animated game. Updates on the development of the game were scheduled for Tuesdays and Fridays, and the company encouraged fans to attend Dream Party 2004, an upcoming anime convention at Tokyo Big Sight in Ariake, on October 11, where they made the first public showcase of the game A follow-up of the venue was made on October 15. On October 26, 0verflow posted that new information about School Days would be in the November issue of Tech Gian, an adult magazine published by Enterbrain.

In a November 6 development post, 0verflow announced that it was planning a public screening of new game material, but was experiencing difficulty acquiring space for it. The company had initially chosen to have the venue in Akihabara but was unable to find a retailer willing to host it, prompting a visit to Osaka the following week. News that the game would contain music by artists such as Minami Kuribayashi, Haruko Momoi, Yozuca, and Yuria was posted on November 30, along with a release date change to February 25, 2005.

On December 28, 2004, 0verflow released a public trial of School Days. They attended Comiket 67 at Tokyo Big Sight from December 29 to 30, and handed out phonecards to the first 50 visitors to their booth. Two months later, on February 2, 2005, the company announced that the game had been postponed again to April 28. From April 5 to April 8, 0verflow concluded their development log with comments from Soyogi Tōno, Kaname Yuzuki, Tatsuya Hirai, Yuki Matsunaga, Hikaru Isshiki, and Hana Yamamoto, the respective voices of Kotonoha, Sekai, Makoto, Otome, Hikari and Setsuna. To address bugs that were later found in the game, 0verflow released a patch to bring School Days to a stable build of 1.11. From June 26, 2007, to March 28, 2008, 0verflow and Lantis-net radio aired the internet radio drama Radio School Days. On April 21, 2011, 0verflow announced via their blog that support for School Days was being discontinued.

== Release ==
School Days was ported to three other platforms. It was first released by interactive movie developer AICherry on September 28, 2007, as a four disc DVD game. That same year, on August 31, Interchannel posted a link on their blog to the official website of School Days L×H, a PlayStation 2 (PS2) port in development by Guyzware, that would be edited of explicit sexual content and fanservice. The game was released on January 17, 2008, and assessed by the Computer Entertainment Rating Organization (CERO), Japan's primary video game content rating system, receiving a 15-years-or-older "C" rating for sexual themes and profanity. The third and final port was developed by PalaceGame for the PlayStation Portable (PSP). After postponing the game on May 11, it was released as four UMDs on June 30, 2010.

0verflow opened what would become the homepage for the remaster School Days HQ on May 21, 2010. The site was finished June 3, and on July 16, the game was postponed to September 24. A trial was publicly released for download on August 7, and from August 20 to September 28, 0verflow promoted the game. Customers who had purchased the original School Days would be given the opportunity to upgrade to HQ for a fee until October 11, by either mailing in their game disc or visiting stores in Akihabara, Osaka or Nagoya. Distributors offered collectable phonecards for reservations, and after a second date change on September 10, the game was released October 8.

On March 3, 2011, 0verflow acknowledged Sekai Project, an unofficial fan translation group, who had reportedly begun localizing School Days in April 2006. Partnering with American distributor JAST USA, School Days HQ, uncensored in English, was announced for a North American release on March 11, 2011. Development instead continued into 2012, and on May 18, JAST announced that the company had begun taking pre-orders for the Collector's Edition, a bundled release of the game packaged with a keychain and mousepad. The company announced weeks later on June 1 that School Days HQ had gone gold. Following news on June 26 that the company would exhibit the game at Anime Expo 2012, JAST made an update to the June 1 announcement that School Days HQ had begun shipping. The downloadable version of the game was later released on August 6.

On May 31, 2025, 0verflow announced School Days Remastered is in development to commemorate the original game's 20th anniversary. On July 4, 2025, JAST USA announced that it will release the English and Mandarin Chinese versions of School Days Remastered. On July 5, 2026, at Anime Expo, JAST USA announced a full English dub for the remastered version.

=== Sales ===
In a national sales ranking of bishōjo games in PC News – a now-defunct Japanese online magazine – School Days premiered as the number one game sold for the second half of April 2005, the second and 17th for the first and second halves of May, the fifth and 26th for the first and second halves of June, and 27th for the first half of July. The School Days renewal edition, released a week after the previous ranking, continued to chart on behalf of the game; it ranked as the thirty-third most sold game for the second half of July, before ending as the thirty-fifth and forty-ninth for the first and second halves of August.

Getchu.com, a major distributor of visual novels and domestic anime products, recorded similar sales. School Days for Windows premiered as the number one game sold for the month of its release, and seventh most for May, ranking as the number one game sold for the first half of 2005 and ninth for the year. The following year, the School Days renewal edition charted as the 20th most sold game for July 2007, dropping to thirtieth from August to October. School Days HQ ranked as the sixth most sold game for October 2010 but failed to chart thereafter.

According to Gamasutra, a video gaming news site, School Days L×H ranked first for a PlayStation 2 game sold in January 2008.

== Media ==
=== Related games ===
0verflow developed several visual novels related to School Days, sharing the same universe. Prior to the development of School Days, 0verflow developed the Radish Vacation visual novel series. The first was Snow Radish Vacation released on December 28, 2001, followed by Summer Radish Vacation on April 1, 2003, and finally Summer Radish Vacation 2 on August 13, 2004.

A prequel titled Summer Days, was released on June 23, 2006, retelling the original game during summer vacation and from the perspective of Setsuna Kiyoura. However, unlike its predecessor, Summer Days was almost universally panned for its heavily bugged state, loads of patches, and recall. Another spin-off titled Cross Days was released on March 19, 2010. Set in the same continuity as School Days, Cross Days follows the life of another protagonist, Yuuki Ashikaga, a high school freshman who also finds himself caught between the affection of two girls, Roka Kitsuregawa and Kotonoha Katsura, during his second term at Sakakino Academy. The game also features yaoi scenarios, during which Yuuki cross-dresses as a maid. 0verflow released Shiny Days on February 2, 2012, which is a remastered version of Summer Days with a new heroine and higher quality animations. A spin-off, Island Days, was developed for the Nintendo 3DS and was released in Japan on July 3, 2014. The game, developed by Klon, focuses on Makoto and the girls becoming trapped on a remote island and includes tower defense elements.

=== Manga ===
Based on the story of the original game, School Days was reimagined as a manga, illustrated by Homare Sakazuki and serialized in the Kadokawa Shoten magazine Comp Ace from May 26, 2006 to September 26, 2007. On July 12, 2007, 0verflow announced that the manga had been collected into its first volume, comprising five chapters set to be released on July 24. Later that year, the second and final volume, comprising the remaining seven chapters, was released on November 21.

No.	Release date	ISBN
1	July 26, 2007	978-4-04-713946-6
1. "Confession" (告白, "Kokuhaku") Boys & Girls; 2. "The Couple's Distance" (二人の距離, "Futari no Kyori") Distance; 3. "First Kiss" (ファーストキッス, "Fāsuto Kissu") Step for Skip; 4. "Another Good Luck Charm" (もうひとつのおまじない, "Mō Hitotsu no Omajinai") Wish & Pain; 5. "And the Story Begins" (そして始まる物語, "Soshite Hajimaru Monogatari") Decide
2	November 26, 2007	978-4-04-713965-7
6. "Right and Left Hand" (右手と左手, "Migite to Hidarite") Unbalance; 7. "Warmth" (ぬくもり, "Nukumori") Sign; 8. "The Couple's Feelings" (二人の想い, "Futari no Omoi") Ripple Mind; 9. "Mask: Innocent" (仮面, "Kamen"); 10. "Two People and One Person" (フタリとヒトリ, "Futari to Hitori") Fall Down; 11. "Slanted Words" (歪むコトバ, "Hizumu Kotoba") ～period～; 12. "The Couple's World" (二人のセカイ, "Futari no Sekai") World's End

Various artists also produced short manga of School Days that were compiled into two comic anthologies. The "School Days Comic Anthology" was released by Ohzora Publishing on October 25, 2005, under their P-mate Comics imprint, containing nine short manga by individual artists. On February 25, 2008, Ichijinsha printed the "School Days Kotonoha Anthology" under their DNA Media Comics imprint, a collection of manga primarily featuring the character Kotonoha Katsura.

=== Books and publications ===
In addition to the manga, School Days was adapted into other print media. The first of these was the "School Days Visual Guide Book" published by Jive on September 16, 2005, an artbook of character illustrations, model sheets, screenplay, storyboards, and a visual hierarchy of the choices and corresponding scenes in the game. Separate editions for the anime television series and Playstation 2 game were also published, on December 1, 2007 and March 21, 2008, respectively. Collections of production work from the Windows game such as character and environment art, screenplay, artist commentaries and all manufactured promotional items were collected in the "School Days Official Visual Artworks" (School Days 公式ビジュアル・アートワークス, School Days Kōshiki Bijuaru Ātowākusu) on December 16, 2005 and also featured in the "SummerDays [sic] & School Days Visual Collection" on August 31, 2006.

The first of four light novels, all illustrated by Junji Goto, was written by Ryuna Okada and printed by Harvest Publishing under their Harvest Novels imprint. Released on December 1, 2005, "School Days: Sekai Hen" (School Days 世界編) retells the original story from the perspective of Sekai. Okada would follow up the book with "School Days: Kotonoha Hen" (School Days 言葉編) on January 1, 2006, switching to the perspective of Kotonoha. Two light novels were also published by Jive, the first of which was written by Takuya Baba, "School Days: Kimi to Iru, Sora" (School Days 君といる、空) and printed on December 16, 2005, and a second by Hiro Akiduki, "School Days: Innocent Blue", released on April 28.

=== Anime ===
School Days was adapted into a twelve-episode anime television series by TNK. Concrete news of this first appeared on June 1, 2007, when 0verflow announced via its blog that the show's official website had gone live. Stations participating in the broadcast included TV Kanagawa, Chiba TV, TV Aichi, TV Osaka, TV Saitama and AT-X, the premiere of which would air on TV Kanagawa on July 3. The anime was aired until September 27 and finished its broadcast on AT-X. From September 26, 2007, to February 27, 2008, the series was compiled into six limited and regular edition DVDs.

TNK also produced two direct-to-video (OVA) episodes of School Days. The first, titled "Valentine Days", was bundled with limited edition copies of School Days L×H, and features an unrelated comedic romp through Valentine's Day as Kotonoha, Sekai, and Otome try to give Makoto giri chocos. The second, "Magical Heart Kokoro-chan", jaunts the series into magical girl territory, portraying Kokoro Katsura as the superheroine Magical Heart; it was released on March 26, 2008.

Discotek Media acquired both the television series and the "Magical Heart Kokoro-chan" OVA, and released them on DVD on June 24, 2014, with English subtitles.

==== Delay of the finale ====
Screenshot of the MS Skagastøl as it appeared in the original compilation footage. The "Nice boat." comment and subsequent meme would derive from this.

On September 17, 2007, the day before the twelfth and final episode of the televised anime was to air on TV Kanagawa, a sixteen-year-old girl murdered her forty-five-year-old father in their Kyoto home with an axe. TV Kanagawa promptly cancelled the Tuesday airing of the finale for its similarly violent content, replacing it instead with a thirty-minute video compilation of scenery footage from Europe including Norway, played to August Wilhelmj's "Air on the G String". Newspapers such as The Japan Times and Mainichi Shimbun reported on the killing and episode preempt on September 19. According to Mainichi Shimbun, Chiba TV and TV Aichi had also cancelled their airings, with AT-X the only station remaining indecisive. 0verflow issued an apology through their blog the same day, asking viewers to stay tuned for updates. In the following week, 0verflow announced that it had arranged for two screenings of the edited finale at the Akihabara 3D Theater on September 27. Those wishing to attend would be required to register a seat by email, be at least 18 years old with photo ID, and bring a Windows copy of School Days or Summer Days. That same day AT-X announced that it had decided to air the unedited finale on September 27 and October 1.

In the wake of the broadcast change, a screen capture of the Norwegian ferry MS Skagastøl, at the time belonging to Fjord1 Fylkesbaatane, from the slideshow surfaced on 4chan alongside the caption "Nice boat.", a phrase which gained popularity in Japan. Google Trends recorded a spike in "Nice Boat" searches around the third quarter of 2007 while Yomiuri Shimbun, a Japanese newspaper, reported that "Nice boat" was the tenth most popular Yahoo! Japan search from September 17 to September 23.

Nice Boat had become so well known that it was used in other Japanese media. The meme appeared as an Easter egg in the first episode of Ef: A Tale of Memories., and was parodied on February 13, 2009, when the Kadokawa Pictures YouTube channel uploaded a short montage of sailboats instead of the previously scheduled premiere of The Melancholy of Haruhi-chan Suzumiya. 0verflow capitalized on the popularity of the phrase, naming their booth at Comiket 73 "Nice boat." and selling meme-inspired merchandise. TNK also paid homage to the meme in "Magical Heart Kokoro-chan", a special direct-to-video episode of the animated series.

=== Concert film ===
Besides the video releases of the School Days anime, a concert film, the School Days Secret Live DVD, was also produced by HOBiRECORDS. Released on June 26, 2006, in conjunction with Summer Days, the film contains footage of a concert held on June 15, 2005 featuring the performances of Miyuki Hashimoto, YURIA, rino, yozuca* and Minami Kuribayashi.

=== Audio CDs ===
From 2005 to 2010, Lantis published six albums of School Days music. The "School Days Vocal Album", a compilation featuring all nine of the game's closing themes, as performed by artists Kiriko, Yozuca*, Miyuki Hashimoto, Yuria, Halko Momoi, Minami Kuribayashi, Rino, and Kanako Ito was the first to be distributed, sharing its April 28, 2005, date with the release of the game itself. The remaining twenty-eight background scores, composed by KIRIKO/HIKO Sound, were released on July 21, officially completing the game's soundtrack. Another compilation, the "School Days Vocal Complete Album [sic]" featuring songs from Summer Days and Cross Days, was released on October 8, 2010.

Three weeks after the premiere of the televised anime on July 25, 2007, Lantis published the single "Innocent Blue" by DeviceHigh, a four-track disc featuring the anime opening of the same name, a disco-inspired song called Dancin' Joker, and their instrumentals. Lantis followed with "School Days: Ending Theme+" on August 22, a sixteen-track disc containing all of the show's closing themes and background scores on September 26.

In addition to music albums, six audio dramas were also produced. "School Days Little Promise", a chronicle of Sekai and Setsuna's childhoods, was the first. Featuring music by Kiriko/Hiko Sound and Kanako Ito, Hobirecords published "Little Promise" as a two-disc set, which 0verflow scheduled for release January 27, 2006. Pre-releases were sold at Comiket 69 from December 29 to 30, 2005. Sometime afterward however, 0verflow announced that pre-released copies of Little Promise were defective, and asked customers to mail in their discs for replacements. The release was also postponed to February 24. Lantis released the remaining five dramas. "School Days Drama CD Vol. 1 Himitsu Hanazono" (ヒ・ミ・ツの花園), a merrymaking of the series six main girls, was released on August 8, 2007. A second, "School Days Drama CD Vol 2. Koi no Nou-hau" (恋のノ・ウ・ハ・ウ), was released October 24, 2007. Radio School Days was compiled into three separate albums: "Futakumidake no Taiikusai" (二組だけの体育祭) was released on November 21, 2007, "Futakumidake no Shakaika Kengaku" (二組だけの社会科見学) on February 6, 2008, and "Futakumi Ijou no Rakkasan Butai" (二組以上の落下傘部隊) on June 21.

=== Merchandise ===
Considerable effort was made to market and promote School Days before and after its release, including the sale of brand merchandise and use of incentives. Through public venues and through the company's online store, 0verflow sold brand keystraps, mousepads, phonecards, book covers, mugs, t-shirts, dakimakura cases, PVC figures, lanyards, business card holders and cosplay material such as the girls' school uniforms and plastic dōzuki.

== Reception ==
The anime series won the Hisashi Maeda Award in the 2007 Japanese Otaku Awards.

Anime News Network's Theron Martin enjoyed the anime series and gave it a B+, saying "Despite its efforts to analyze and reinterpret harem series, School Days probably would have sunk into anime obscurity if not for the nature of its final episode and the circumstances surrounding it not airing. However, those analytical efforts give it a value beyond its sensationalism. If viewers find Makoto unlikable, it is because he was meant to be an object lesson, not someone that they should want to relate to. That the actions of him and the others progressively push the series away from what's expected of harem series holds a fascination akin to watching a train wreck play out in very slow motion". UK Anime Network, a British online anime and manga magazine, gave the television series a 7 out of 10, summarizing it as "An utter subversion of the high school romance genre, which is disturbing and unsettling... yet oddly compelling in its own way." Takato of the French website Manga News gave the anime series 17 out of 20, and describes the series as "School Days is not a joyful romance but rather oppressive, destabilizing and unhealthy because of the behavior of the characters. We are certainly shocked, but this is precisely what makes the strength of this unique series. School Days is certainly a series to watch to be amazed, or to be amused by all these humiliations if you are sadistic." THEM Anime Reviews, a website devoted to the review of anime, gave the series a less favorable 1 out of 5 stars, citing "overblown, shallow, and flat" characters and that although "School Days looks fascinating when you see screenshots of it and read episode guides", the reviewer found it to be "annoying, stupid, mean-spirited, and full of some of the biggest idiots [he had] seen in an anime in a long time."

On June 12, 2015, the Chinese Ministry of Culture listed School Days among 38 anime and manga titles banned in China.
