= Ryusuke Hamamoto =

Japanese manga artist and illustrator

Ryusuke Hamamoto 濱元 隆輔
- Born: February 16, 1981 (age 45) Fukuoka Prefecture, Japan
- Area: Manga artist
- Notable works: Petit Eva: Evangelion@School

Ryusuke Hamamoto (Japanese: 濱元 隆輔, Hepburn: Hamamoto Ryūsuke; born February 16, 1981), also known by pen name Ryu Moto, is a Japanese manga artist from Fukuoka Prefecture. He is best known for his work on Petit Eva: Evangelion@School.

== Works ==
- Ultimate Girls (Dengeki Bunko, ASCII Media Works)
- Ultimate Girls (Dengeki Comic Gao!, ASCII Media Works)
- LR Shōjo Tantei Dan (LR少女探偵団) (Manga Time Kirara Max, Houbunsha)
- Urekko Dōbutsu (うれっこどうぶつ) (Magi-Cu, Enterbrain)
- White Chaos (Comic Seed!, Penguin Shobō)
- Neko no Sakaue (ねこのさかうえ) (Magi-Cu, Enterbrain)
- Petit Eva: Evangelion@School (Shōnen Ace, Kadokawa Shoten)
- Gūzō Majyo Idol Witch Project (ぐうぞうまじょ! Idol Witch Project) (Quarterly Gelatin, Wanimagazine)
- Usagi Rurikarakusa (ウサギ ルリカラクサ) (Web Comic Gekkin, Bandai Visual)
- Sayuriri (サユリリ) (Comic Rex, Ichijinsha)
- Hiyoko Bocchi (ひよこぼっち) (Famitsu, Enterbrain)
- Oni Work (オニワーク, Oni Wāku) (Manga Club Original, Takeshobo)
- Enka to Hanamichi (エンカとハナミチ) (Comic Earth Star, Earth Star Entertainment)
