= The Mystical Laws =

2012 film by Isamu Imakake

- Directed by: Isamu Imakake
- Screenplay by: Ryuho Okawa
- Produced by: Zuisho Motochikawa; Koji Matsumoto
- Starring: Takehito Koyasu; Daisuke Hirakawa; Ayumi Fujimura; Ryoka Yuzuki; Shinichiro Miki; Satsuki Yukino; Banjo Ginga
- Music by: Yuichi Mizusawa
- Production company: Happy Science
- Release date: 2012
- Country: Japan
- Language: Japanese

The Mystical Laws is a 2012 Japanese animated film directed by Isamu Imakake.

Despite being critically panned, the film was submitted for the Academy Award for Best Animated Feature category alongside From Up on Poppy Hill (2011) but was not selected.

== Voice cast ==
- Takehito Koyasu
- Daisuke Hirakawa
- Ayumi Fujimura
- Ryoka Yuzuki
- Shinichiro Miki
- Satsuki Yukino
- Banjo Ginga

== Reception ==
John Anderson of Variety wrote, "The evoking of divinities, none of which seems capable of putting much motion in this motion picture, is pretty delirious, as is the thinking." A critic from The Hollywood Reporter wrote, "The endlessly convoluted mumbo-jumbo might be bearable if director Isamu Imakake had infused the proceedings with any semblance of wit or humor". Mark Olsen of the Los Angeles Times wrote, "The Mystical Laws works neither as a straightforward sci-fi anime nor as a recruitment and advancement tool for the beliefs of Happy Science".

== Other versions ==
The film was also dubbed in Hindi and featured the promotional song "Aa Chale" sung by Sonu Nigam and composed by Bathiya and Santhush.
