= Isamu Imakake =

Japanese animator (born 1968)

- Born: April 22, 1968; Kagoshima Prefecture, Japan
- Occupation: Animator

Isamu Imakake (今掛 勇, Imakake Isamu; born in April 22, 1968) is a Japanese animator, screenwriter, television director and producer. He also worked as illustrator for some manga like Geobreeders.

His directorial work, The Mystical Laws, was submitted for the Academy Award for Best Animated Feature category but was not selected by the jury as one of the final nominees.

== Works ==
- Gunbuster (1988; animation)
- Nadia: The Secret of Blue Water (1990; photography)
- The Hakkenden (1990–1991; photography)
- Z-Knights OVA (1991; mechanical design and mechanic animation director)
- Gekkō no Piasu Yumemi to Gin no Bara Kishidan (1991; animation)
- Hong Lang (1993; set design, storyboard, animation director and photography)
- The Irresponsible Captain Tylor (1993; animation)
- Nekketsu Saikyō Go-Saurer (1993; opening and ending theme animator)
- Oira Uchu no Tankofu (1994; mechanical design)
- Street Fighter II: The Animated Movie (1994; visual effect)
- Street Fighter II V (1995; visual effect)
- Neon Genesis Evangelion (1995; animation)
- Ehrgeiz (1997; original design)
- Neon Genesis Evangelion: Death & Rebirth (1997; animation)
- Awol: Absent Without Leave (1998; character design)
- Getter Robo Armageddon (1998; animation)
- Twilight of the Dark Master (1998; animation)
- Cowboy Bepop (1998; set design)
- Bomberman B-Daman Bakugaiden (1998; animation)
- The Laws of the Sun (2000; setting)
- Project ARMS (2001; storyboard)
- Cowboy Bebop: The Movie (2001; setting and photography)
- Captain Tsubasa (2001; chief director, design, storyboard and production)
- Cyborg 009 (2001; storyboard)
- InuYasha the Movie: Affections Touching Across Time (2001; storyboard)
- Twin Spica (2003; animation)
- The Golden Laws (2003; visual director)
- Area 88 (2004; director)
- Gankutsuou: The Count of Monte Cristo (2004; ending theme animation)
- Otogi-Jūshi Akazukin (2006; storyboard)
- The Laws of Eternity (2006; director)
- Kishin Taisen Gigantic Formula (2007; storyboard)
- Zoku Natsume Yūjin-chō (2009; storyboard and production)
- Basquash! (2009; storyboard)
- Kiddy Girl-and (2010; storyboard)
- Durarara!! (2010; storyboard and opening theme animation)
- My Little Monster (2012; opening theme animation)
- The Mystical Laws (2012; director)
- Amnesia (2013; storyboard, animation and ending theme production and animation)
- My Teen Romantic Comedy SNAFU (2013; storyboard)
