= Ultimate Girls =

Japanese anime television series

- Cover of the first DVD

UG☆アルティメットガール (UG☆Arutimetto Gaaru)
- Genre: Comedy, parody, superheroine
- Anime television series
- Directed by: Yuji Mutoh
- Produced by: Takashi Kitagaki
- Written by: Satoru Nishizono
- Music by: Moka
- Studio: Studio Matrix
- Licensed by: Media Blasters
- Original network: Chiba TV, TV Saitama, Sun TV, TV Kanagawa, Tokyo MX
- Original run: January 10, 2005 – March 28, 2005
- Episodes: 12
- Light novel
- Written by: Seiichi Take
- Illustrated by: Ryusuke Hamamoto
- Published by: MediaWorks
- Imprint: Dengeki Bunko
- Published: April 10, 2005
- Manga
- Written by: Ryusuke Hamamoto
- Published by: MediaWorks
- Magazine: Dengeki Comic Gao!
- Published: October 2005
- icon

Ultimate Girls (UG☆アルティメットガール, UG☆Arutimetto Gāru) is a Japanese anime television series produced by m.o.e. which parodies the genres of tokusatsu, kaiju, and superheroes; mainly themes from the Ultra Series and Kyodai Hero subgenre. It was broadcast in Japan from January 10, 2005, to March 28, 2005, and had a total of 12 episodes which ran for 13 minutes each. The series has been licensed in North America by Media Blasters and was released on September 2, 2014.

== Plot ==
During one of the many monster attacks on the city where the story takes place, Silk Koharuno and her two friends attempt to get closer to the monster to get a better view. Unfortunately, the city's protector, UFO-man, comes to the rescue but inadvertently steps on them and crushes the girls to death. Feeling sorry for what he had done, UFO-man blames their deaths on the monster and promises to bring them back to life by lending them his power. However, now they must become the city's protectors as well.

== Characters ==
Silk Koharuno (小春野 白絹, Koharuno Shiruku)
Voiced by: Misato Fukuen
The main heroine of the trio. Although very shy and reserved about her new duty, she is the first of the three to demonstrate their new powers as UFO-man's successor, growing into a giant heroine. Only minutes after the transformation, she discovers her unusual battle suit is deteriorating little by little, until she is totally nude. After she goes back to normal size in the first episode, Silk wears a costume of Yui's Element Suit from Corrector Yui which she borrows from Tsubomi. She has a crush on Tsubomi's older brother Makoto, her senior classmate and school photographer. She is referred to by the crowd as Hinnyu (Little Boobs).
Vivienne Ōtori (鳳 ヴィヴィアン, Ōtori Vivian)
Voiced by: Hitomi Nabatame
One of Silk's best friends. She, along with Silk and Tsubomi, was accidentally crushed and resurrected by UFO-man. Nervous about indecent exposure, she does not try her powers as an Ultimate Girl until Tsubomi fails in her first transformation and Silk refuses to do so again. Left with no choice, she offers to go, being dubbed Ultimate Girl Kyonyū (Big Boobs) by spectators. When attempting to avoid exposing herself when her suit deteriorates, Vivienne is the first to learn how their powers are supposed to work. By being embarrassed, they generate an energy that can be projected as a weapon against the giant monsters. She has a secret crush on Silk. In a flashback showing her mother, it is revealed that she is a hafu, as her mother is White, possibly Russian.
Tsubomi Moroboshi (諸星 つぼみ, Moroboshi Tsubomi)
Voiced by: Ai Tokunaga
Silk and Vivienne's friend and classmate. Tsubomi is a cosplayer by hobby, so when she realized that she too was a giant heroine, she took the idea without feeling any shame or embarrassment. However, because of this attitude, she was basically useless, since the source of their strength comes from being thoroughly embarrassed and projecting that emotion into an energy that can defeat their giant adversaries. Even after learning this, Tsubomi is not fazed and enjoys her new profession as a heroine and still manages to hold back the many giant monsters they encounter by tricking them instead of using brute power. It was Tsubomi's idea to go by the name "Ultimate Girl." She is called "Loli" by the press, due to her underdeveloped chest.
UFO-man (UFOマン, Yūfōman)
Voiced by: Tōru Furuya
The giant hero who has always been fighting innumerable giant extraterrestrial monsters that rampage throughout Japan, until he accidentally steps on Silk, Vivienne, and Tsubomi. Out of sympathy for the girls (while also blaming the monster for their deaths), he sacrifices much of his power and energy to resurrect the three of them. In doing so, his body shrinks considerably, forcing him to rely on a UFO-like craft to levitate. By giving the girls his power, they are forcibly pressed into serving as giant heroines in his stead, by changing his hover craft into a wand which they must grab in order to invoke the transformation process.
Yosaku Okamura (岡村 与作, Okamura Yosaku)
Voiced by: Takashi Matsuyama
A journalist who follows the UFO-man and Ultimate Girls story. He offered a reward for photos showing who the Ultimate Girls really were. He originally nicknamed the first Ultimate Girl, Silk, "UFO-man P" (in the DVD release and in the manga, the nickname was "UFO-man Girl" (UFOマン子, Yūfōmanko), which is a play on words with the Japanese word manko (真婿), meaning vagina). Okamura is obsessed with the bodies of the Ultimate Girls.
Makoto Moroboshi (諸星 真, Moroboshi Makoto)
Voiced by: Yūki Tai
Tsubomi's older brother and a member of the high school press club as a photographer. He is always looking for photos of UFO-man, and is pursuing the reward offered for taking photos of the Ultimate Girls.
Mayu Koharuno (小春野 繭, Koharuno Mayu)
Voiced by: Akiko Kimura
Silk's older sister and a reporter working with Okamura

== The Monsters ==
The monsters of the series are born by green alien slime fusing to human beings with the monsters representing their personalities. If the opal-like cores are destroyed or separated the monster will disintegrate into gold particles of light.

- Gullmark: Appears in episode 1. Its only known power is having a highly articulate body. It is a homage to Gomess from Ultra Q.
- Shupo: Appears in episodes 2 and 3. Its only known power is morphing into a steam engine train. It is a homage to King Joe from Ultra Seven.
- Ochuusha: Appears in episode 4. Powers include a syringe on arms, super speed, and stethoscope on the pelvis. It is a homage to Baltan Seijin from the original Ultraman with characteristics of Zetton (also from Ultraman) and Metrojn Seijin (from Ultra Seven).
- Megami Mask: Appears in episode 5. Powers include a pair of glue bazookas on the back, wrestling skills, and summonable steel armor. He is a reference to the editor of Megami Magazine, the magazine that publishes the Ultimate Girls manga and his mask is arguably a reference to Ultimate Muscle.
- Hachiro: Appears in episode 6. His only known power is a boxing glove on him main pair of tentacles.
- Mahler: Appears in episode 7. Powers include burrowing, emitting hypnotic waves from the giant metronome on its face, and a maestro wand. It is a homage to Mochiron from Ultraman Taro.
- Dainioh: Appears in episodes 8 and 9. Powers include a club, a constricting bead necklace, a spare body, burrowing by spinning, swimming, and six extra arms in its body. It is a homage Majin from Daimajin.
- Mushuusaa: Appears in episode 10. Powers include a pair of scythe arms and a whip tail. It is a homage to Gyaos and Gigan.
- Giant Makato: Appears in episodes 11 and 12. He is a homage to super robots such as Mazinger Z and the guyver units from Bio Booster Armor Guyver.

== Music ==
Opening Theme
"White Heat" by Yozuca*
Ending Theme
"3 Sentimental" by Misato Fukuen

== Episodes ==
No.	Title	Original release date
1	"Ultimate Battle #1" "Arutimetto Sakusen Dai-Ichi-Go" (アルティメット作戦第一号)	10 January 2005
While looking for a better vantage point for viewing the monster attacking Tokyo, Silk, Vivienne, and Tsubomi get crushed by the giant hero UFO-Man as he comes to save the day. He resurrects them, but at the cost of being unable to fight the monsters himself. He gives Silk the power to transform into a giant heroine, but her costume only lasts a few minutes before beginning to disappear. Silk saves the day by defeating her first monster.
2	"Sparkle! The Three Ultimate Sisters" "Kagayake! Arutimetto Sanshimai" (輝け! アルティメット三姉妹)	17 January 2005
Vivienne and Tsubomi learn that they, too, can transform into giant heroes, but with the same caveat as before. Tsubomi transforms and tries to fight the monster, but is quickly defeated. Vivienne transforms ad fights the alien, and Tsubomi's brother is captured by the attacking alien.
3	"Time for Ultimate Girl to Die! Tokyo Is Annihilated!" "Arutimetto Gāru ga Shinutoki! Tōkyō wa Kaimetsusuru!" (UGが死ぬとき! 東京は壊滅する!)	24 January 2005
The girls learn that their power comes from being embarrassed (because their costumes keep gradually disappearing until they are naked), and the more embarrassed they become, the stronger they become. Vivienne immobilizes the alien, but it breaks free. The girls learn that the core of the alien must be destroyed. Silk transforms and defeats the alien. Silk thinks Vivienne is mad at her and also has a crush on Makoto, Tsubomi's older brother.
4	"Ah! Tsubomi Is Being Eaten!" "A! Tsubomi ga Taberareru!" (あっ! つぼみが食べられる!)	31 January 2005
The local TV station has put out a reward for pictures identifying the Ultimate Girls. When the next monster attacks, Tsubomi goes to fight it, but appears to be defeated after posing for all the photographers. As her costume begins disappearing, she begins to act sick, thus tricking the monster into coming to help her. She then rips out its core and defeats it.
5	"From Akihabara with Love" "Akiba yori Ai o Komete" (アキバより愛をこめて)	7 February 2005
Silk and Vivienne are tricked into working with Tsubomi at her part time job: waitressing at a cosplay cafe while dressed (respectively) as Hazuki from Moon Phase and Sailor Moon from Pretty Soldier Sailor Moon. While Tsubomi is entertaining the customers, Silk and Vivienne go on break just as a new monster appears. Vivienne has trouble beating the monster until she sees Silk cheering her on. After the fight, Makoto tells Silk that he likes the Ultimate Girl who just won the battle, which causes Silk to become upset and run away.
6	"Silk's Desperation" "Shiruku Yabure Kabure" (白絹やぶれかぶれ)	14 February 2005
The girls go to the beach, unaware that Silk's sister has set up an event there she is hoping to use to discover the true identities of the Ultimate Girls. Silk continues to misunderstand Vivienne's feelings for Makoto, and Makoto is hoping to snap a picture of an Ultimate Girl as she changes back to normal. After Silk defeats the monster, Vivienne explains that she's not in love with Makoto, but that she has someone else.
7	"Ultimate Girls into the West" "Arutimetto Gāru Nishi e" (アルティメットガール西へ)	21 February 2005
Silk's class goes on a school trip, and she leave UFO-man behind in her room. On the way past Mount Fuji, a monster appears and puts everyone to sleep. UFO-man arrives and wakes up the girls. Silk fights the monster, but begins to lose when the monster begins tickling her. However, this also increases her power, and she defeats the monster, but not before everyone wakes up and the bus with her classmates drives away before she finishes the fight. As she's walking down the highway after the fight, Makoto stops and picks her up, giving her a ride to where the bus was going.
8	"Going to Kyoto" "Kyōto Ikumasu" (京都行きます)	28 February 2005
The girls and their class arrive in Kyoto and enjoy an evening relaxing in an onsen after spending several hours learning Zen meditation. Vivienne takes the other girls out for a night on the town in order to cheer up Silk, who has learned that Makoto is going back to Tokyo early. A new monster appears and Tsubomi appears to defeat it after using her meditation techniques to lure it into an unguarded state. However, the monster was not defeated, and it escaped.
9	"Vivienne Dies in the Setting Sun" "Vivian Sekiyō ni Shisu" (ヴィヴィアン夕陽に死す)	7 March 2005
The girls are still in Kyoto the morning after the monster escaped. Vivienne arranges for Silk and Makoto to be alone at an amusement park while she and Tsubomi go off somewhere else. While they are going around, Makoto confesses he likes "Little Boobs" the best of the three Ultimate Girls, which causes Silk to become very embarrassed. At that moment, the monster reappears within the amusement park. Even though she's feeling sick from riding a rollercoaster three times in a row, Vivienne fights and defeats the monster in order to allow Silk to continue her "date".
10	"It's the Ultimate Girls! Burning Up!" "Arutimetto Gārusu Da! Moero!" (UGだ! 萌えろ!)	14 March 2005
It's Christmas time. After giving a present to Makoto at a party, Silk finds out he's going to the United States to study journalism. In order to try to cheer her up, Vivienne and Tsubomi take her to Comike, where Silk promptly gets separated from the other two girls just as a new monster appears. After defeating the monster, Silk admits to Makoto that she's one of the Ultimate Girls.
11	"Transformation" "Hentai" (変態)	21 March 2005
Makoto misunderstands Silk's confession, thinking she is only cosplaying, and he asks if he can take her picture when she's in costume. Tsubomi takes the opportunity to get the other girls to cosplay with her as the Ultimate Girls. Makoto finds out that Okamura is a dōjinshi collector who has collected a very large number of Ultimate Girl books and has a table reserved for the final day of Comike to sell a book of his own. Makoto is inspired by him and decided to become the ultimate Ultimate Girls collector. Suddenly, a new monster appears and defeats Tsubomi in one punch, but not before she notices that her brother, Makoto, is the core of the monster. Vivienne goes to fight the monster, but starts losing to it, too. Tsubomi tells Silk that the monster is her brother.
12	"Farewell, Ultimate Girl" "Saraba Arutimetto Gāru" (さらばアルティメットガール)	28 March 2005
Vivienne is defeated, with the monster demanding to know who they really are. UFO-man explains how the monsters come into existence and states that there isn't a way to save Makoto as he is directly connected to the core of the monster. Silk offers to give up her body so that Makoto can live once the monster is defeated, and asks UFO-man to erase any memory of her from Makoto. She then goes to fight the monster, which she defeats after destroying its core. However, she hesitated before destroying it, and didn't hurt Makoto very much, so UFO-man used his power to repair Makoto instead. Makoto decides to not go to America after all, and gives her a picture he took of her while she was transformed.

== Reception ==
Tim Jones of THEM Anime Reviews said that the series is a "desperate attempt to be funny" if someone likes laughing at "innuendo and phallic imagery." He criticized the show's character designs, the behavior of the characters, and said the series "sucked from beginning to end" even as he praised the series opening song, but called most of the music in the series "lame and forgettable" and said the voice acting is "weak." He further said that the anime has a lot of "underage fan service," most of which are naked girls, and called it a "dirty, dirty show."
