= Ayumi Fujimura =

Japanese voice actress (born 1982)

- 藤村 歩
- Born: September 3, 1982 (age 44); Tokyo, Japan
- Occupation: Voice actress
- Years active: 2002–2019
- Agent: Ken Production
- Notable work: A Certain Magical Index as Seiri Fukiyose; Maid Sama! as Misaki Ayuzawa; Hunter × Hunter as Neferpitou; The Legend of Zelda as Fi and Princess Zelda; Street Fighter as Ibuki; Arms as Mechanica; Norn9 as Koharu

Ayumi Fujimura (藤村 歩, Fujimura Ayumi; born September 3, 1982) is a Japanese voice actress from Tokyo, Japan.

Since April 1, 2019, Fujimura has taken an indefinite hiatus from acting.

== Filmography ==
=== Anime ===
2005

- Kotenkotenko (Fairy)

2006

- NANA (Woman)
- Nishi no Yoki Majo - Astraea Testament (Marie Oset)
- Ramen Fighter Miki (Child 1 (ep. 1), Female student (ep. 4), Pink Star (ep. 3), Sales assistant (ep. 5)
- Koi suru Tenshi Angelique (Girl (ep. 1))
- Kemonozume (Girl (ep. 2), Shokujinki B (ep. 9))
- Garine's is Music (Garine Sakura)
- Living for the Day After Tomorrow (Karada Iokawa)
- Ghost Slayers Ayashi (Daughter)
- Hell Girl: Two Mirrors (Takuma Kurebayashi)
- Bartender (Miwa Kurushima)

2007

- Gakuen Utopia Manabi Straight! (Futsal member (ep. 8))
- Nodame Cantabile (Flight attendant (ep. 1), Minako Momodaira (young), Yuki Inoue)
- Hayate the Combat Butler (Chiharu Harukaze)
- Touka Gettan (Nene Midou)
- Over Drive (Mikoto's Sister, Masaro)
- Polyphonica (Suzuna)
- Bakugan Battle Brawlers (Tsuyoshi, Shirutisu)
- Bokurano (Reporter)
- Kaze no Stigma (Ayano Kannagi)
- Potemayo (Mimi Hachiya)
- Suteki Tantei Labyrinth (Chiharu)
- Clannad (Female student (ep. 6))
- Shakugan no Shana Second (Kimiko Nakamura)
- Shugo Chara! (Yuki Hatoba)
- Ghost Hound (Female elementary school student A (ep. 14), Female student (ep. 5), Underclassman B (ep. 17))

2008

- Shigofumi: Letters from the Departed (Woman (ep. 2))
- Porphy no Nagai Tabi (Mina)
- Aria the Origination (Daughter (ep. 1))
- Yatterman (Hirari)
- Allison & Lillia (Female soldier (ep. 5))
- Blassreiter (Lulu)
- Nabari no Ou (Raimei Shimizu)
- Psychic Squad 'Naomi Umegae)
- Kaiba (Ed)
- Golgo 13 (Natalie)
- Kyōran Kazoku Nikki (Kyōka Midarezaki)
- Ikki Tousen: Great Guardians (Chō Shōshifu)
- Birdy the Mighty: Decode (Ryoko Nagatani)
- Sands of Destruction (Lowen)
- Natsume's Book of Friends (Female High School Student (ep. 9), Fiancée (ep 8), Student (ep. 4), young Takashi Natsume)
- Noramimi (Muimui)
- Legends of the Dark King: A Fist of the North Star Story (Shimoto)
- Shugo Chara!! Doki— (Mimori Morino)

2009

- Asu no Yoichi! (Saleslady)
- Chrome Shelled Regios (Countia Varmon Faness (eps 1, 23-24), Secretary A (10 episodes), Shop employee (ep. 4), Waitress (ep. 5))
- Kupu!! Mamegoma! (Akane Mamegawa)
- Examurai Sengoku (Tsuzumi)
- Major (Announcer)
- Pandora Hearts (White cat)
- Basquash! (Aurora Skybloom)
- Queen's Blade: The Exiled Virgin (Emperor Hinomoto)
- Slap Up Party
- Hayate the Combat Butler!! (Chiharu Harukaze)
- Shin Mazinger Shōgeki! Z-Hen (Shirō Kabuto)
- Hatsukoi Limited (Nao Chikura)
- Sweet Blue Flowers (Yoshie Manjome)
- Taisho Baseball Girls (Noriko Owari)
- Modern Magic Made Simple (Katamari, Mayuri Anehara)
- Shugo Chara! Party! (Yuka)
- Tegami Bachi (Niche)
- The Sacred Blacksmith (Cecily Cambell)
- Yumeiro Pâtissière (Azuki Tachibana)

2010

- Ladies versus Butlers! (Mitsuru Sanke)
- The Qwaser of Stigmata (Mafuyu Oribe)
- Hanamaru Kindergarten (Ryōta)
- Ikki Tousen: Xtreme Xecutor (Shifu Choushou)
- Kaichō wa Maid-sama! (Misaki Ayuzawa)
- Mayoi Neko Overrun! (Actual Sister)
- Uragiri wa Boku no Namae o Shitteiru (Young Hotsuma)
- Sekirei: Pure Engagement (Namiji)
- Academy Apocalypse: Highschool of the Dead (Reporter (ep. 6))
- Panty & Stocking with Garterbelt (Kneesocks)
- Bakuman. (Aiko Iwase)
- Tegami Bachi: Reverse (Niche)
- Psychic Detective Yakumo (Haruka Ozawa)
- Squid Girl (Eiko Aizawa)
- And Yet the Town Moves (Homeroom teacher)
- A Certain Magical Index II (Seiri Fukiyose)
- Magic Kaito (Aoko Nakamori)

2011

- Pretty Rhythm Aurora Dream (Yuri)
- Astarotte's Toy (Griselda "Zelda" Reginhard)
- The Qwaser of Stigmata II (Mafuyu Oribe)
- Blue Exorcist (Young Yukio Okumura)
- Inazuma Eleven GO (Kageyama Hikaru)
- Squid Girl Season 2 (Eiko Aizawa)
- Bakuman. 2 (Aiko Iwase)
- Shakugan no Shana III (Kimiko Nakamura)
- Chibi Devi! (Ms. Ito, Pepe, Ryu, Aunt Rikako)
- Hunter × Hunter (2011) (Neferpitou)

2012

- Aquarion Evol (MIX)
- Lagrange: The Flower of Rin-ne (Ayane Iwa, Haruka Uehara)
- Ozuma (Mimei)
- Zetman (Mayu Hashimoto)
- Mysterious Girlfriend X (Ryōko Suwano)
- EUREKA SEVEN AO (Maggie Kwan)
- Inazuma Eleven GO 2: Chrono Stone (Kageyama Hikaru, Okatsu)
- Muv-Luv Alternative: Total Eclipse (Aki Iwami)
- Upotte!! (Emten)
- Love, Elections & Chocolate (Kii Monzen'naka)
- Hayate the Combat Butler: Can't Take My Eyes Off You (Chiharu Harukaze)
- The Pet Girl of Sakurasou (Saori Himemiya)
- Bakuman. 3 (Aiko Iwase)
- Psycho-Pass (MC (ep. 9), Reporter (ep. 17))

2013

- Danchi Tomoo (Keiko Kamakura)
- Dokidoki! Precure (Kyouda)
- Gargantia on the Verdurous Planet (Striker)
- Hayate the Combat Butler! Cuties (Chiharu Harukaze)
- Kill la Kill (Mataro Mankanshoku, Rei Hououmaru)
- Gingitsune (Haru)
- Inazuma Eleven GO 3: Galaxy (Rodan Gasgus)

2014

- Saki: The Nationals (Murakichi Misaki)
- Aikatsu! (Kanon)
- Doraemon (Pita)
- Buddy Complex (Lene Kleinbeck)
- Hero Bank (Sen Tatsuzato)
- Buddy Complex: Kanketsu-hen Ano Sora ni Kaeru Mirai de (Lene Kleinbeck)
- HappinessCharge PreCure! (Kazumi)
- Rokujyoma no Shinryakusha!? (Study Group Director)
- Free! - Eternal Summer (Hayato Shigino)
- Rail Wars! (Alice Kuji)
- Rage of Bahamut: Genesis (Gabriel)
- Inō-Battle wa Nichijō-kei no Naka de (Hitomi Saito)
- Pocket Monsters XY (Eclair)

2015

- Isuca (Isuca)
- JoJo's Bizarre Adventure: Stardust Crusaders (Young Polnareff)
- Log Horizon 2 (Roe2)
- Seraph of the End: Battle in Nagoya (Aiko Aihara)
- Haikyū!! (Hana Misaki)
- The Idolmaster Cinderella Girls (Rookie trainer, veteran trainer, trainer)
- The Idolmaster Cinderella Girls 2nd Season (Rookie trainer, veteran trainer, trainer)
- The Rolling Girls (Masami Utoku / Maccha Green)
- Tantei Kageki Milky Holmes TD (Tianma Hiroko)

2016

- Magi: Adventure of Sinbad (Pipirika)
- Mob Psycho 100 (Ichi Mezato)
- Norn9 (Koharu)

2018

- A Certain Magical Index III (Seiri Fukiyose)

=== Original video animation (OVA) ===
- Shakugan no Shana Tokubetsuhen: Koi to Onsen no Kougai Gakushuu! (2006) (Kimiko Nakamura)
- 夢想夏郷, 東方 (Touhou Musou Kakyou / A Summer Day's Dream) (2008–2016) (Aya Shameimaru)
- Mobile Suit Gundam Unicorn (2010) (Audrey Burne)
- Astarotte no Omocha! (2011) (Griselda "Zelda" Reginhard)
- Rinne no Lagrange: Kamogawa Days (2012) (Haruka Uehara)
- Love, Chunibyo & Other Delusions Lite (2012) (Tomo-chan)
- Love, Chunibyo & Other Delusions! -Heart Throb- Lite (2014) (Tomo-chan)

=== Films ===
- Naruto Shippuden the Movie (2007) (Shion)
- The Garden of Sinners movies (2007-2013) (Azaka Kokutou)
- Space Battleship Yamato: Resurrection (2009) (Miyuki Kodai)
- Hayate the Combat Butler! Heaven Is a Place on Earth (2011) (Chiharu Harukaze)
- The Mystical Laws (2012) (Leika Chan)
- Santa Company (2014) (Noel)
- Aikatsu! (The Movie) (2014) (Kanon)
- Girls und Panzer der Film (2015) (Megumi, Boco)
- Mobile Suit Gundam Narrative (2018) (Mineva Lao Zabi)
- Natsume's Book of Friends the Movie: Tied to the Temporal World (2018) (Young Takashi Natsume)

=== Video games ===
2007

- Shoukan Shoujo: Elemental Girl Calling (Chakoru, Robin, Mel)
- Corpse Seed (Koharu Shinozaki, Kotori Shinozaki, Kokoa Shinozaki, Kokoro Shinozaki)

2008

- Aoi Shiro (Kyan Migiwa)
- Luminous Arc 2 Will (Elicia)
- Corpse Seed: Plant Revolution (Koharu Shinozaki, Kotori Shinozaki, Kokoa Shinozaki, Kokoro Shinozaki)
- Asaki, Yumemishi (Koku, Miku)
- Zettai Karen Children DS: Dai-4 no Children (Naomi Umegae)
- Tetsudō Musume DS ～Terminal Memory～ (Arisu Kuji)

2009

- Boku no Natsuyasumi 4 (Princess Tomoko)
- Corpse Seed 2 (Koharu Shinozaki, Kotori Shinozaki, Kokoa Shinozaki, Kokoro Shinozaki)
- Kidō Senshi Gundam: Senki Record U.C. 0081 (Figline Isuteru)
- Rune Factory 3: A Fantasy Harvest Moon (Marion)
- Queen's Blade: Spiral Chaos (Harpy)
- Final Fantasy XIII (Cocoon Citizens)

2010

- Corpse Seed 2: Burning Gluttony (Koharu Shinozaki, Kotori Shinozaki, Kokoa Shinozaki, Kokoro Shinozaki)
- Super Street Fighter IV (Ibuki)
- Tsuyokiss (PSP) (As Serebu Tachibana)

2011

- The Legend of Zelda: Skyward Sword (Fi)

2012

- Street Fighter X Tekken (Ibuki)
- Generation of Chaos: Pandora's Reflection (Olivia)
- Touhou: Azure Reflections (Marisa Kirisame)
- Corpse Seed 3 (Koharu Shinozaki, Kotori Shinozaki, Kokoa Shinozaki, Kokoro Shinozaki)
- Koi to Senkyo to Chocolate Portable (Kii Monzennaka)
- Under Night In-Birth (Yuzuriha)
- Halo 4 (Cortana)
- Tekken Tag Tournament 2 (Miharu Hirano)

2013

- Z/X Zekkai no Seisen (Natalia Cambiasso)
- Norn 9 (Koharu)
- The Last of Us (Sarah)
- BlazBlue: Chronophantasma (Konoe A. Mercury/Phantom)
- The Witch and The Hundred Knights (Visco)
- Arcadia no Senhime (Luise)
- The Legend of Zelda: A Link Between Worlds (Princess Zelda)

2014

- Corpse Seed 3: Heartclub Extreme (Koharu Shinozaki, Kotori Shinozaki, Kokoa Shinozaki, Kokoro Shinozaki)
- Croixleur Sigma (Francesca Storaro)
- Hyrule Warriors (Fi)
- Granblue Fantasy (Korwa)

2015

- Resident Evil: Revelations 2 (Moira Burton)
- Batman: Arkham Knight (Catwoman)
- BlazBlue: Central Fiction (Nine the Phantom)

2016

- Star Ocean: Integrity and Faithlessness (Anne Petriceani)
- Street Fighter V (Ibuki) (Note: Shared role with Kana Ueda.)
- The King of Fighters XIV (Zarina)

2017

- Arms (Mechanica)
- Corpse Seed 4 (Koharu Shinozaki, Kotori Shinozaki, Kokoa Shinozaki, Kokoro Shinozaki)
- Ever Oasis (Tethu/Tethi)

2018

- Corpse Seed 4: Endless Brawl (Koharu Shinozaki, Kotori Shinozaki, Kokoa Shinozaki, Kokoro Shinozaki)
- SNK Heroines: Tag Team Frenzy (Zarina)
- Super Smash Bros. Ultimate (Princess Zelda/Sheik, Mii Fighter Type 4)
- Dragalia Lost (Aeleen)
- BlazBlue: Cross Tag Battle (Nine the Phantom, Yuzuriha)

2019

- Arknights (Rope/Savage)
- A Certain Magical Index: Imaginary Fest (Seiri Fukiyose)

2021

- The Legend of Zelda: Skyward Sword HD (Fi - archival audio)

=== Drama CDs ===
- Café Latte Rhapsody (????) (Ichikawa)

=== Tokusatsu ===
- Kamen Rider Drive (2015) (Sigma Circular (Female Voice) (ep. 46 - 47))

=== Dubbing roles ===
==== Live-action ====
- The Art of Getting By – Sally Howe (Emma Roberts)
- Cleveland Abduction – Amanda Berry (Samantha Droke)
- CSI: Cyber – Raven Ramirez (Hayley Kiyoko)
- Did You Hear About the Morgans? – Jackie Drake (Elisabeth Moss)
- Dredd – Cassandra Anderson (Olivia Thirlby)
- Expelled – Vanessa (Andrea Russett)
- Harry Potter and the Half-Blood Prince – Katie Bell (Georgina Leonidas)
- Harry's Law – Jenna Backstrom (Brittany Snow)
- Journey 2: The Mysterious Island – Kailani (Vanessa Hudgens)
- Love, Rosie – Rosie Dunne (Lily Collins)
- Monte Carlo – Grace Bennett / Cordelia Winthrop-Scott (Selena Gomez)
- Ouija – Laine Morris (Olivia Cooke)
- Ratter – Emma (Ashley Benson)
- The Sound of Music (2011 TV Tokyo edition) – Liesl von Trapp (Charmian Carr)
- Spin Out – Lucy (Morgan Griffin)
- The Suspect – Choi Kyung-hee (Yoo Da-in)
- Terminator Genisys – Sarah Connor (Emilia Clarke)
- The Way, Way Back – Susanna Thompson (AnnaSophia Robb)
- We're the Millers – Casey Mathis (Emma Roberts)

==== Animation ====
- The Batman – Amber / Vulture
- Kingsglaive: Final Fantasy XV – Crowe Altius
- Mars Needs Moms – Ki
- The Penguins of Madagascar – Marlene
