= Yozuca =

Japanese singer-songwriter

Yozuca* (b. March 21 in Kumamoto), stylised in all lowercase, is a Japanese female singer. She performs songs mainly for games and anime and is known especially for her vocal contributions to the Da Capo series. Her debut was in 2002 with the song "Da Capo: dai-2 botan no chikai", used as the theme song for the adult PC game D.C.: Da Capo. She works under Peak A Soul+, and most of her works are released by Lantis.

Yozuca* has often worked alongside Rino of CooRie, who also sings for the Da Capo series. They have performed together under the name yozurino*, and have been hosting the internet radio show Web Kissa yozurino* since 2004.

== Discography ==
=== Singles ===
- ダ・カーポ ～第2ボタンの誓い～ / Da Capo: dai-2 botan no chikai (Released August 22, 2002)
1. ダ・カーポ ～第2ボタンの誓い～ / Da Capo: dai-2 botan no chikai — PC game D.C.: Da Capo opening theme
4. ダ・カーポ ～第2ボタンの誓い～ / Da Capo: dai-2 botan no chikai off vocal

Sales: +20,000 copies

- サクラサクミライコイユメ / Sakura Saku Mirai Koi Yume (Released July 24, 2003)
1. サクラサクミライコイユメ / Sakura Saku Mirai Koi Yume — anime television series D.C.: Da Capo opening theme
3. サクラサクミライコイユメ / Sakura Saku Mirai Koi Yume (off vocal)

Sales: +100,000 (Gold)

- going my way (Released July 22, 2004)
1. going my way — anime television series Girls Bravo first season opening theme
2. 月のヒカリ / Tsuki no Hikari
3. going my way (off vocal)
4. 月のヒカリ / Tsuki no Hikari (off vocal)

Sales: +63,000 copies

- φなる・あぷろーち / Final Approach (Released October 6, 2004)
1. φなる・あぷろーち / Final Approach — PS2 game Final Approach opening theme
3. φなる・あぷろーち / Final Approach (off vocal)

Sales: +25,000+ copies

- Ever After (Released February 2, 2005)
1. Ever After — anime television series Girls Bravo second season opening theme
2. 本当の笑顔 / Hontou no Egao
3. Ever After (off vocal)
4. 本当の笑顔 / Hontou no Egao (off vocal)

Sales: +55,000 copies

- WHITE HEAT (Released February 16, 2005)
1. WHITE HEAT — anime television series Ultimate Girls opening theme
3. WHITE HEAT (カラオケ) / WHITE HEAT (karaoke)

Sales: +40,000 copies

- サクライロノキセツ / Sakurairo no Kisetsu (Released July 21, 2005)
1. サクライロノキセツ / Sakurairo no Kisetsu — anime television series D.C.S.S.: Da Capo Second Season opening theme
2. チェーリング / Che-ring
3. サクライロノキセツ / Sakurairo no Kisetsu (OFF VOCAL)
4. チェーリング / Che-ring (OFF VOCAL)

Sales: +120,000 copies (Gold)

- サクライロノキセツ / Sakurairo no Kisetsu Re-Product and Remix and PV (Released September 29, 2005)
1. サクライロノキセツ / Sakurairo no Kisetsu crunch world mix
2. サクラサクミライコイユメ / Sakura Saku Mirai Koi Yume Virtual beautiful STAYKOOL club mix
3. サクライロノキセツ / Sakurairo no Kisetsu night rainbow takes

Sales: +22,000 copies

- たったひとつだけ / Tatta Hitotsu Dake (Released February 8, 2006)
1. たったひとつだけ / Tatta Hitotsu Dake — anime television series Tactical Roar opening theme
2. ヒトリゴト / Hitorigoto
3. たったひとつだけ / Tatta Hitotsu Dake (OFF VOCAL)
4. ヒトリゴト / Hitorigoto (OFF VOCAL)

Sales: +35,000 copies

- キラメク / Kirameku (Released April 26, 2006)
1. キラメク / Kirameku — anime television series Joshikousei GIRL'S-HIGH opening theme
2. 春の日 / Haru no Hi
3. キラメク / Kirameku (Off vocal)
4. 春の日 / Haru no Hi (Off vocal)

Sales: 52,000+ copies

- 君とあしたへ / Kimi to Ashita e (released April 26, 2006)
1. 君とあしたへ / Kimi to Ashita e — PC game True Tears ending theme
2. 君とあしたへ / Kimi to Ashita e: Traditional Euro Mix
3. 君とあしたへ / Kimi to Ashita e: LUVNOTE MIX
4. 君とあしたへ / Kimi to Ashita e *karaoke

Sales: +16,000 copies

- ダ・カーポII ～あさきゆめみし君と～ / Da Capo II: Asaki Yumemishi Kimi to (Released June 7, 2006)
1. ダ・カーポII ～あさきゆめみし君と～ / Da Capo II: Asaki Yumemishi Kimi to — PC game D.C. II: Da Capo II opening theme
3. ダ・カーポII ～あさきゆめみし君と～ / Da Capo II: Asaki Yumemishi Kimi to (Off Vocal)

Sales: +180,000 copies (Gold)

- Happy my life: Thank you for everything!! (Released May 9, 2007)
1. Happy my life: Thank you for everything!! — PC game D.C.II Spring Celebration opening theme
2. believe yourself — PC game D.C.II Spring Celebration insert song
3. Happy my life: Thank you for everything!! (Off Vocal)
4. believe yourself (Off Vocal)

Sales: +110,000 copies (Gold)

- サクラキミニエム / Sakura Kimi ni Emu (Released October 24, 2007)
1. サクラキミニエム / Sakura Kimi ni Emu — anime television series D.C.II: Da Capo II opening theme
2. Rainbow 07
3. サクラキミニエム / Sakura Kimi ni Emu (off vocal)
4. Rainbow 07 (off vocal)

Sales: +285,000 copies (Platinum)

- サクラ アマネク セカイ / Sakura amaneku sekai (Released April 23, 2008)
1. サクラ アマネク セカイ / Sakura amaneku sekai — anime television series D.C.II: Da Capo II S.S. opening theme
2. In the deep
3. サクラ アマネク セカイ /Sakura amaneku sekai (off vocal)
4. In the deep (off vocal)

Sales: +115,000+ copies (Gold)

- モーニング・シュガー・レイズ / Morning-sugar rays (Released August 27, 2008)
1. モーニング・シュガー・レイズ /Morning-sugar rays
2. One
3. モーニング・シュガー・レイズ /Morning-sugar rays (off vocal)
4. One (off vocal)

Sales: +39,000 copies

- エス・エス・ディー / S.S.D! (Released August 26, 2009)
1. エス・エス・ディー /S.S.D! Princess lover: ED theme
2. No rule
3. エス・エス・ディー /S.S.D!(off vocal)
4. No rule (off vocal)

Sales: +53,600 copies

- 愛永久 〜Fortune favors the brave〜/めぐり愛逢い (Released January 27, 2010)
1. 愛永久 〜Fortune favors the brave〜/めぐり愛逢い
2. 愛永久 〜Fortune favors the brave〜/めぐり愛逢い(off vocal)

Sales: +34,000 copies

- ボクはきみのそばにいる! (Released February 23, 2011)
1. ボクは君のそばにいる -PCゲーム、OVA『T.P.さくら 〜タイムパラディンさくら〜』エンディングテーマ-
2. モラトリアム
3. ボクは君のそばにいる(off vocal)
4. モラトリアム (off vocal)

Sales: +19,000 copies

=== Albums ===
- soleil*garden (Released September 1, 2004)
1. ダ・カーポ ～第2ボタンの誓い～ / Da Capo: dai-2 botan no chikai
2. Special Day ～太陽の神様～ / Special Day: taiyou no kamisama — PC game D.C. Summer Vacation opening theme
3. ひまわり / Himawari
4. Fragment: The heat haze of summer / PC game Suika opening theme
5. サクラサクミライコイユメ / Sakura Saku Mirai Koi Yume
6. Fly together
7. 風が鳴いている / Kaze ga Naiteiru
8. 大事なもの / Daiji na Mono
9. going my way ～primary version～
10. 花 / Hana
11. きっと微笑むから / Kitto Hohoemu kara — PC game Doko e Iku no, Ano Hi insert song
12. きずな / Kizuna

Sales: +150,000 copies (Gold)

- nico. (Released August 2, 2006)
1. Only 1?
2. 神様強い勇気ください / Kamisama Tsuyoi Yuuki Kudasai
3. Ever After
4. 冒険者 / Boukensha
5. 本当の笑顔 / Hontou no Egao
6. チェーリング / Che-ring
7. 月のヒカリ / Tsuki no Hikari
8. WHITE HEAT
9. サクライロノキセツ / Sakurairo no Kisetsu
10. たったひとつだけ / Tatta Hitotsu Dake
11. ヒトリゴト / Hitorigoto
12. コーヒー / Coffee

Sales: +125,000 copies (Gold)

- Ageha (Released January 23, 2008)
1. Ageha
2. Daybreak for me
3. I.D.
4. キラメク / Kirameku
5. believe yourself
6. shining☆star
7. 春の日 / Haru no Hi
8. Blue flame
9. sayonara jewel
10. 記憶の海 / Kioku no Umi — anime television series School Days ending theme
11. Happy my life: Thank you for everything!!
12. ダ・カーポII ～あさきゆめみし君と～ / Da Capo II: Asaki Yumemishi Kimi to

Sales: +250,000 (Platinum)

- stitch museum (Released May 12, 2010)
1. No ruLe
2. Do you love me?
  1. 愛永久 〜Fortune favors the brave〜
3. in the Deep
4. I will go
5. Graduation from yesterday
6. S.S.D!
7. Enjoy Life
8. Morning-sugar rays
9. レンブラントの光
10. 雨上がりに咲いた虹
11. 陽はまた昇る 〜stitch museum Ver〜
12. Rainbow 07
13. スタートライン [4:59]

Sales: +274,000 (Platinum)

- yozuca* 10th Anniversary Best (Released May 27, 2009)

Sales: +750,000 copies (3× Platinum)

- yozuca* 5th álbum - Asterisk music* (Released July 18, 2012)

Sales: +133,000 copies (Gold)

=== Other ===
- Songs from D.C.: Da Capo (Released November 22, 2002)
  - "Dakara Kiss no Sei ne" (だからキスのせいね) — PC game D.C.: Da Capo image song
  - "All my love of the World" — PC game D.C. White Season ending theme
  - "Dream: the other side" — PC game D.C.: Da Capo ending theme 2
  - "Natsu no Owari ni..." (夏の終わりに...) DC game Suika image song (new arrange)
  - "Sow" PC game InfantariaXP ending theme (new arrange)
- Anime television series Green Green Kikaku CD: Kanenone Jam02 (Released December 17, 2003)
  - "Cherry" (チェリー) — Reika Morimura image song
- Onegai Twins Image Vocal Album: Esquisse (Released December 26, 2003)
  - "RETRY" — Episode 10 image vocal
- TV animation D.C.: Da Capo Vocal Album: dolce (Released December 26, 2003)
  - "Chime to you" — insert song
  - "Takaramono" (宝物) — insert song
  - "Honto no Kimochi" (ほんとのきもち) — insert song
  - "Da Capo: dai-2 botan no chikai Twin Vocal Version" (ダ・カーポ ～第2ボタンの誓い～ ツインヴォーカルバージョン) — performed by yozuca* & rino
  - "Sakura Saku Mirai Koi Yume Acoustic Version" (サクラサクミライコイユメ アコースティックバージョン)
- D.C.P.S. Character Song Vol.1 (Released April 7, 2004)
  - "Mirai Chizu" (未来地図) — PS2 game D.C.P.S.: Da Capo Plus Situation ending theme
- Tentama 2wins Vocal Plus (Released April 21, 2004):
  - "Precious Time" — PS2 game Tentama 2wins opening theme
  - "Ai no Hane" (愛の羽) PS2 game Tentama 2wins ending theme
- Saishuu Shiken Kujira: progressive memories (Released December 1, 2004)
  - "Ushiro Sugata" (ウシロスガタ) — PC game Saishuu Shiken Kujira insert song
- crystal2: Circus Vocal Collection Vol.2 (Released January 13, 2005)
  - "Akai Ito" (赤い糸) — PC game D.C. Summer Vacation ending theme
- Girls Bravo second season image vocal album: GO! GO! GIRLS! (Released March 24, 2005)
  - "Trust me!" — Kirie's theme
- School Days Vocal Album (Released April 28, 2005)
  - "BYE-BYE-TEARS" — PC game School Days ending theme of some Sekai endings
- Green Green 3: Hello Goodbye Original Soundtrack + Complete Album 2001–2005: 18 songs Memories (Released August 24, 2005)
  - "Orgel" (オルゴール) — PC game Green Green 3: Hello Goodbye Chitose Kashiya ending theme
- TV animation D.C.S.S.: Da Capo Second Season Vocal Album: dolce2 (Released December 21, 2005)
  - "Renai Sketch" (恋愛スケッチ) — insert song
  - "Dear your mind" — insert song
  - "Happy Basket" (ハッピーバスケット) — insert song
- Summer Days Original Sound Track (Released June 23, 2006)
  - "Tanpopo no Wataboushi" (タンポポの綿帽子) — PC game Summer Days ending theme
- D.C.II: Da Capo II Vocal Album: Songs From D.C.II (Released July 26, 2006)
  - "Mabushikute Mienai" (まぶしくてみえない) — PC game D.C.II: Da Capo II insert song
- Edelweiss Original Sound Track: FLOWERS (Released December 21, 2006)
  - "Shukufuku no Uta" (祝福の歌) — PC game Edelweiss Natsume Amamiya ending theme
- Edelweiss Vocal album CD: Sunset・Sunrise (Released March 28, 2007)
  - "Ai no Tane" (あいのたね) — Natsume Amamiya image theme
- Suika A.S+ Eternal Name Vocal album since Fragment (Released July 25, 2007)
  - "Natsu ga Kureta Okurimono" (夏がくれた贈り物) — PS2 game Suika A.S+ Eternal Name shuumaku ending theme
- Anime television series School Days Ending Theme+ (Released August 22, 2007)
  - "Kioku no Umi" (記憶の海) — anime television series School Days ending theme
- Anime television series Princess Lover Ending Theme+ (Released August 26, 2009)
  - "S.S.D" — anime television series Princess Lover ending theme
- Anime television series So, I Can't Play H! Ending Theme (Released August 8, 2012)
  - "Platinum 17" So, I Can't Play H! Ending Theme

== Notes and references ==
- yozuca* listed at Lantis web site
