= Overflow (brand) =

Video game division of Stack Ltd.

- Product type: Visual novels, Erotica, Eroge
- Current owner: Stack
- Country: Japan
- Introduced: November 26, 1999
- Website: 0verflow.com

Stack
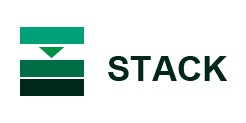
- Type: Yūgen gaisha
- Industry: Interactive entertainment Brand novelties
- Founded: September 1992
- Founder: Akio Ōnuma
- Defunct: 2012
- Headquarters: Bentenchō, Shinjuku, Tokyo, Japan
- Area served: Japan
- Key people: Akio Ōnuma (CEO); Kimihiko Iwasaki (Director)
- Products: Welcome to Pia Carrot!! 2 School Days; Summer Days; Cross Days
- Number of employees: 12
- Website: stacksoft.co.jp

Overflow (オーバーフロー) (stylized 0verflow) is the adult game brand of Japanese video game company Stack Ltd. (有限会社スタック) known for its School Days franchise. Stack's headquarters are located in the Sugishō Building (杉商ビル) in Kanda, Chiyoda, Tokyo.

0verflow's PureMail video game was adapted into a two-episode OAV in 2001.

0verflow's Imouto de Ikou! video game was adapted into a two-episode OVA in 2003.

0verflow's School Days video game was adapted into a 12-episode anime series in 2007. Both School Days and Cross Days have also received manga adaptations.

Stack's Welcome to Pia Carrot!! video game series was adapted into a three-episode hentai OVA from 1997 to 1998. Its sequel, Welcome to Pia Carrot!! 2 was adapted into a three-episode hentai OVA from 1998 to 1999, and a six-episode OVA titled Welcome to the Pia Carrot!! 2 DX from 1999 to 2000. The video game also received an anime film titled Welcome to Pia Carrot!! -Sayaka no Koi-monogatari- in 2002. The Pia Carrot series later served as the primary inspiration for 0verflow's own Radish series (including Summer Radish Vacation!! and Snow Radish Vacation!!). These titles are considered parodies of Welcome to Pia Carrot!! 2, featuring similar restaurant settings and character designs. Most notably, the character Mai Kiyoura is a direct homage to Pia Carrot 2 heroine Hinano Uzuki, even sharing the same voice actress, Kozue Yoshizumi.

On February 10, 2012, 0verflow confirmed that Shiny Days, a remake of Summer Days, would be the last title produced by the brand. Customers were told that the company would continue to support their line of video games.

== Games ==
0verflow

Main releases:

- November 26, 1999: Large PonPon (らーじ・PONPON, Rāji PonPon)
- August 25, 2000: Pure Mail (ピュアメール, Pyua Mēru)
- April 27, 2001: 0verflow Pleasure Box (オーバーフローぷれじゃ～ボックス, Ōbāfurō Purejā Bokkusu)
- December 28, 2001: Snow Radish Vacation!! (Snowラディッシュバケーション!!, Sunō Radisshu Bakēshon!!)
- December 27, 2002: Let's Go for the Little Sister! (妹でいこう！, Imouto de Ikou!)
- December 28, 2002: Chiyoren Treasure Disc Vol. 1 ~For Us Chiyoren~ (ちよれんお宝ディスク Vol. 1 ～我等ちよれんの為に～, Chiyoren Otakara Disk Vol. 1 ~Warera Chiyoren no Tameni~)
- August 13, 2003: Summer Radish Vacation!! (Summerラディッシュバケーション!!, Samā Radisshu Bakēshon!!)
- December 27, 2003: Magical☆Unity (マジカル☆ユニティー, Majikaru☆Yunitī)
- April 30, 2004: Miss Each Other (ミスイーチアザー, Misu Īchi Azā)
- August 13, 2004: Summer Radish Vacation!! 2 (Summer ラディッシュ・バケーション！！ 2, Samā Radisshu Bakēshon!! 2)
- October 15, 2004: Lost M (ロスト・エム, Rosuto Emu)
- April 28, 2005: School Days (スクールデイズ, Sukūru Deizu)
- June 23, 2006: Summer Days (サマーデイズ, Samā Deizu)
- March 19, 2010: Cross Days (クロスデイズ, Kurosu Deizu)
- April 27, 2012: Shiny Days (シャイニーデイズ, Shainī Deizu)
- July 3, 2014: Island Days (アイランドデイズ, Airando Deizu)
- April 28, 2016: Strip Battle Days 2 (ストリップバトルデイズ2, Sutorippu Batoru Deizu 2)

Stack

Stack was involved in games such as:

- July 26, 1996: Welcome to Pia Carrot!! (MS-DOS)
- October 18, 1996: Welcome to Pia Carrot!! (Windows)
- May 23, 1997: Welcome to Pia Carrot!! (PC-FX)
- October 31, 1997: Welcome to Pia Carrot!! 2 (Windows 95)
- March 12, 1998: Welcome to Pia Carrot!! (Sega Saturn)
- October 8, 1998: Welcome to Pia Carrot!! (Sega Saturn)
- November 16, 2000: Mercurius Pretty: End of the Century (Dreamcast)
- December 2, 2000: Welcome to Pia Carrot!! 2.2 (Game Boy Color)
- June 21, 2001: Welcome to Pia Carrot!! 2.5 (Dreamcast)
- October 26, 2001: Welcome to Pia Carrot!! 2 (Windows Me/2000)
- November 30, 2001: Welcome to Pia Carrot!! 3 (Windows 95/98/Me/2000)
- February 6, 2003: Welcome to Pia Carrot!! 2 (Dreamcast)
- March 27, 2003: Welcome to Pia Carrot!! 3 (Dreamcast, PlayStation 2)
- April 23, 2004: Welcome to Pia Carrot!! 3 (Game Boy Advance)
- 2006: Welcome to Pia Carrot!! G.O. ~Grand Open~
- 2006: Pia Carrot G.O. TOYBOX ~Summer Fair~
- 2007: MahJong in Pia Carrot~
- 2008: Welcome to Pia Carrot!! G.P.
- 2009: Welcome to Pia Carrot!! 4
- 2010: Pia Carrot 4 FD
- 2014: PriPia ~Prince Pia Carrot~
