= Kenzero =

Computer trojan on peer-to-peer networks

Kenzero is a computer trojan that is spread across peer-to-peer (P2P) networks and is programmed to blackmail its victims by collecting personal information and publishing their browsing history online in a public database.

== History ==
The Kenzero trojan was first discovered by Symantec on November 27, 2009, but researchers believe it had spread undetected for a few months prior.

According to cybersecurity experts, Kenzero originated in Japan and is believed to be created by the same cybercriminal group behind the earlier trojan viruses Zeus and Koobface.

== Operations ==
Kenzero attacks computers that download files through peer-to-peer (P2P) networks. A fake installation screen appears upon downloading an infected file, prompting victims to enter personal information. The virus then logs the victim's browsing history and publishes it online in a database. Finally, a dialog box or email is sent to the victim demanding a fee of approximately $16 USD for the removal of their browsing history from the database.

The virus hides inside video files of hentai anime and spreads via P2P file sharing networks.
