= Summer Days =

Japanese erotic visual novel

- Limited edition cover of Summer Days (DVD-ROM)
- Genre: romance, eroge, harem, slice of life
- Video game
- Developer: 0verflow (Microsoft Windows); AiCherry (DVD) ixia (PSP)
- Publisher: 0verflow (Windows); AiCherry (DVD); PalaceGame (PSP)
- Genre: Visual novel
- Platform: Windows; DVD; PSP
- Released: JP: June 23, 2006; JP: April 27, 2012 (Shiny Days); NA: September 25, 2015 (Shiny Days)
- Light novel
- Written by: Okada Ryuna
- Illustrated by: Junji Goto
- Published by: Harvest Publishing
- Imprint: Harvest Novels
- Published: December 1, 2006
- Volumes: 1

Summer Days is an erotic visual novel developed by 0verflow, released on June 23, 2006, for Microsoft Windows and later ported as a DVD game and for the PlayStation Portable (PSP). It is the second installment of the School Days series, succeeding the visual novel of the same name and preceding Cross Days. Unlike the previous titles that exist in the same continuity however, Summer Days is a spin-off of the original story retold from the perspective of Setsuna Kiyoura, a high school student out for summer vacation who finds herself attracted to Makoto Itou, a classmate and a patron of a restaurant she eventually comes to work at. The game retains the anime-like presentation familiar to the franchise, requiring little interaction from users, engaging players through a nonlinear plot they are given opportunities to change, and concluding with an ending specific to the choices made during play.

0verflow announced work on Summer Days in October 2005 and marketed it through a promotional campaign consisting of public screenings, sale of merchandise, and a celebratory event on the day of release. In spite of the game's positive performance during this time however, Summer Days was almost universally panned for its heavily bugged state that prompted a disorganized release of large, frustrating patches and an eventual recall. On August 26, 2011, 0verflow announced that the sale of Summer Days was being discontinued and that work on Shiny Days, a modern remake, was underway. The remake was released on April 27, 2012.

Though not as generous as its predecessor, Summer Days made transitions into other media following the game's release. A comics anthology of the series was published, as was two art books of character illustrations and a light novel. The game's soundtrack was also released by Lantis.

== Gameplay ==
As a visual novel, Summer Days contains extremely minimal gameplay. The game's core onscreen presentation is composed of scenes that are viewed from a mostly third-person perspective. At predetermined intervals, the game brakes, and players are presented with one to two responses or actions relevant to the scene in progress to make, or not make, on behalf of characters. Each selection branches the game's progress up that point in an alternate direction, while also causing the player's love toward a character to blossom, plateau, or diminish, thus providing for a nonlinear storytelling experience. As with it predecessor, being an erotic title, relationships between characters may become sexual; the sex scenes have pixelized censors over genitals (the North America release did not censor the genitals). Each route the game takes does invariably conclude at some point with an ending specific to it, thus, players who wish to watch additional endings, and notably aforementioned sex scenes, will have to play through the game more than once.

Example of a conversation in Summer Days. Here, Otome is talking to Makoto.

Much like the other games in the franchise, Summer Days is unusual in that instead of traditionally static characters with subtitled dialogue, it incorporates motion and voice, making it reminiscent of an animated series. Cinamatics naturally play on their own, and players are afforded the ability to pause, fast-forward, and even skip those they've seen before; sex scenes, additionally, become unlockable from the main menu as they are reached in the game. Progress can be saved at any time and loaded from either the main menu or during play.

Limited edition copies of Summer Days were also bundled with the standalone Flash mini-game Ahoge Battle (アホ毛 バトル, Ahoge Batoru), a whimsical take on School Days ending "Bloody End". Choosing from three difficulties, the player controls Sekai, who attempts to fight off Kotonoha by pressing any two configurable keys in quick session. In the case of the highest difficulty, a third is also used. If the player is able to fend off their opponent long enough to fill their end of a progress bar, the game is won and a tally of how many times each key was pressed is recorded. If the player loses, they are given a chance to continue. In an identical fashion, limited edition copies of Shiny Days are expected to come bundled with Strip Battle Days (ストリップバトルデイズ, Sutorippu Batoru Deizu), a rock-paper-scissors mini-game based around the disrobing of female characters.

== Plot ==
Setsuna Kiyoura is a high school student out of school for summer vacation, enjoying the break with family and peers. When her childhood friend Sekai is bedridden with mumps and unable to attend to her part-time waitressing job, Setsuna much to her chagrin, agrees to fill in for her. Though she finds the work almost thoroughly unpleasant, from the revealing uniforms to difficult customers, Setsuna manages to overcome the challenges of the job through the encouragement of friends, particularly that of Makoto Itōu, a classmate she likes.

=== Setting ===
Set in the same universe as School Days, Summer Days retells the story of the first game had it occurred during the midst of summer vacation instead of at school and from the perspective of another protagonist. The game takes place in a fictional, undisclosed prefecture of Japan that spans a range of cities, particularly a coastline called Haramihama, where the game's restaurant and center of activity, Radish, is established. As such Summer Days shares the same setting with a previous 0verflow game called Summer Radish Vaction!! as well as the same characters of Setsuna and Sekai's mothers.

== Characters ==
Summer Days incorporates all but a few of the recognized cast from School Days while introducing a handful of characters that would become new to the franchise. The game focuses on the life of Setsuna Kiyoura, a character remembered for her impassive personality in School Days, repurposed as the thoroughly more open and emotional protagonist of its sequel. A first-year high school student out for summer vacation, Setsuna lives in the fictional city of Motehara with her mother Mai, a restaurateur who is frequently at work, and routinely visits Sekai Saionji, her childhood friend.

In spite of the resentment she develops for the job she later takes, Setsuna finds the restaurant a social outlet. Besides reacquainting with Sekai's mother Youko, the manager, and a couple of meddlesome co-workers, Noan and Oruha, Setsuna meets a handful of new and familiar people on the job. Her first acquaintance is with Kokoro Katsura, a cheerful pre-teen who regularly stops in before piano lessons, Itaru Itou, a sweet little girl visiting for the summer, and Itaru's older brother Makoto, a classmate whom Setsuna has a crush on.

Through Makoto, Setsuna is further introduced to Otome Katou, Makoto's best friend and a member of the school's women's basketball team, her rambunctious younger sister Karen, and Karen's friends Futaba and Kazuha Nijou, a pair of identical twins. Of the people Setsuna knows, Hikari Kuroda, a girl whose family owns a bakery known for its custard pie, and Ai Yamagata, a bespectacled and soft-spoken classmate, make occasional stopovers.

== Development ==
News about Summer Days arguably first appeared on October 1, 2005, when 0verflow posted a link to the game's then-live website on their official blog. On April 1, 2006, 0verflow began a blog for the game, the first of which announced that Summer Days had been postponed from an original release in April to June 23. Character profiles were added between April 9 to June 17.

Promotion for the game began shortly after. 0verflow announced on April 26 that it would be attending Dream Party 2006, an anime convention, in Tokyo on May 4 and in Osaka on May 28, selling retail copies of previous titles and Summer Days wall scrolls. In addition to announcing its attendance, the company also began to sell costumes of the game's waitress uniform on April 26. On May 2, 0verflow posted that the company would be visiting Akihabara, Osaka, Tokushima, Koriyama, Nagoya and Sapporo showcasing the game and selling Summer Days phone cards. Following a downloadable sample of the Summer Days limited edition DVD on May 12, 0verflow released a teaser of the game on May 18. The game's opening cinema was later posted for download on June 10.

As Summer Days approached release, 0verflow announced on June 17 that it would host an autograph signing by the game's character artist, Junji Goto, from June 24 to 25 in Nagoya and Osaka respectively, and that a celebratory event would be hosted at the Kyoto Kaikan Hall from 11:00am to 7:30pm on June 23. Unfortunately for the company, Summer Days would not live up to its hype.

On December 1, 2006, 0verflow posted that it would be attending Comic Exhibit 71, an anime convention, from December 29 to 30, selling Summer Days merchandise, such as phone cards and lanyards. Following a short merchandise campaign from January 1 to January 9, 2007, and the attendance of Dream Party 2007 in Osaka and Tokyo from April to May respectively, active promotion for Summer Days effectively ended.

=== Patches and recall ===
On June 22, 2006, the day before the game's release, 0verflow posted on their blog that a patch called 1.01B, at 1.25 GB, was being distributed through file hosting sites and BitTorrent as a successor to a 1.01A at 2.29GB. Customers were encouraged to use BitComet and to seed the patch to others after download. On June 28, having discovered that the game had been released in a heavily bugged condition, 0verflow issued an apology to its customers, stating that work on patches had begun and would be distributed to players through BitTorrent and retail outlets at no charge. Players who had contacted the company would equally be sent copies of the patches in the mail. Holyseal.net, a file hosting service that 0verflow had used for its patches, accounts that from June 24 to July 24, eleven additional patches, comprising 1.02B, 1.02, 1.03, 1.03B, 1.04, 1.04B, 1.05, 1.05B, 1.06, 1.07 and 1.09, totaling roughly 8.56GB, were released. On October 30 0verflow posted 2.01, the final patch necessary to bring the game to stable build.

Two days after patch 1.06 had been posted on July 7, 2006, 0verflow announced that limited edition copies of Summer Days were found to contain uncensored sex scenes, a violation of their game rating partner's policy and Article 175 of the Penal Code of Japan. As a result, 0verflow issued a recall of the affected games. Customers who had purchased limited edition copies were asked to contact the company via mail for replacements; on October 11, 0verflow announced that renewals would be shipped out on October 27. As a result of the game's unprofitable recall, a rumor surfaced that 0verflow was forced to lay off half of its company employees, reported on at least once by New-akiba.com, a Chiyoda-based online magazine for Akihabara.

=== Ports ===
Summer Days was ported to two other platforms. AiCherry, an interactive movie developer, announced on January 17, 2008, that it had picked up the game for development, releasing it as a DVD game on April 11. PalaceGame, a UMD publisher, also published the game for the PlayStation Portable (PSP) on September 24, 2010.

=== Remake ===
The cover of Shiny Days

News alluding to a remake or sequel of Summer Days called Shiny Summer Days surfaced on August 26, 2011, when 0verflow announced via their blog that support for Summer Days was being discontinued. Days later on August 31, the company began its first promotion for the new game, selling brand T-shirts which reportedly sold out on September 16. Promotions continued with the attendance of Dream Party 2011 in Tokyo on October 3, where 0verflow sold brand phone cards and ornaments, T-shirts and dakimakura cases. The game's official website went live on December 1, revealing the new story and characters, two making first appearances. A day later on December 2, 0verflow announced that retailers would begin accepting pre-orders on December 15, followed by a public release of the game's opening on December 6 and a subsequent promo on December 16.

On February 2, 2012, a public trial of Shiny Days was released for download. Eight days later on February 10, 0verflow announced that the game had been postponed from its original launch date to sometime in late April. The company followed up this announcement on March 12, stating that a more specific date would be posted in the next couple of days. The date change was announced on Nico Nico Douga as April 27.

Shiny Days received a North American release on September 29, 2015, through JAST USA, with translation by former fan translation group Sekai Project. However, JAST USA announced that sex scenes involving the underage character Kokoro and Makoto will be removed from the North American version of the game, due to the possibility of these scenes being considered child pornography, which is a federal crime in the United States. These scenes can be added back via a patch that was made available for download three months after the game's initial release, though.

== Sales ==
In a national sales ranking of bishōjo games in PCNEWS, a now-defunct online magazine, Summer Days ranked as the number one game sold for the second half of June 2006, seventh most for the first half of July, twenty-fifth for the second half of October, before ending as the twenty-eighth and forty-eighth game for the first and second half of November.

Getchu.com recorded similar sales. Summer Days for Windows was the number one game sold during the month of its release but failed to chart any further thereafter, ranking eighth in the company for the overall year.

== Media ==
Summer Days Original Soundtrack

=== Books and publications ===
Summer Days never transitioned into a serialized manga, though it did make it into other print. The first of these instances was a comics anthology by Junji Goto, fittingly titled Summer Days Comic Anthology, published by Comic XO on October 25, 2006. Five days later, on October 30, Jive published two art books; The Summer Days & School Days Visual Collection and Summer Days Visual Guidebook. The final publication to be made was a light novel written by Okada Ryuna, illustrated by Junji Goto, and published by Harvest Publishing under their Harvest Novels imprint on December 1.

=== Audio CD ===
Like School Days, the original soundtrack of Summer Days was reproduced for distribution on June 23, 2006, by Lantis. The album contains all the game's background music, all of which was composed by KIRIKO/HIKO Sound, and theme songs performed by YURIA, yozuca*, Minami Kuribayashi and Kanako Itō, totaling 31 tracks.

Original sound track listing
No.	Title	Writer(s)	Length
1.	"SummerDays"	Masaki Suzuki	4:20
2.	"Dandelion Veil" (タンポポの綿帽子, Tanpopo no Men Boushi)	Masaki Suzuki	4:16
3.	"The Story Begins at the Sea" (海から始まる物語, Umi Kara Hajima Ru Monogatari)	Masaki Suzuki	5:36
4.	"It Clears Up After Cloudy Weather" (曇りのち晴れ, Kumori Nochi Hare)		1:45
5.	"One Summer Day"		1:56
6.	"One Summer Day ~Waiting for Your Call~"		1:24
7.	"Sands of Twilight" (夕暮れの砂浜, Yuugure no Sunahama)		1:49
8.	"Good Night" (おやすみ, Oyasumi)		1:50
9.	"The Accent on Life"		1:29
10.	"It's Show Time!"		1:30
11.	"Festival Music" (お祭り囃子, Omatsuri Hayashi)		1:19
12.	"Grove of the Village Shrine" (鎮守の森, Chinju no Mori)		2:03
13.	"OBK Coming to Town" (OBK が街にやってきた, Obk ga Machi Niyattekita)		1:23
14.	"Until the Day We Meet" (また会う日まで, Mata au Nichi Made)		2:24
15.	"IAI Spirit"		1:33
16.	"Road to Hope" (希望への道, Kibou Heno Michi)		2:13
17.	"Saboritai!" (さぼりたい!)		2:06
18.	"Self-righteousness" (唯我独尊, Yuigadokuson)		1:40
19.	"Refuse"		1:56
20.	"As Close As Possible"		2:43
21.	"While Drifting..." (漂いながら..., Tadayoi Nagara...)		2:12
22.	"In the Midst of Fumbling" (手探りの中で, Tesaguri no Naka de)		2:30
23.	"Sweet Kiss"		1:33
24.	"Surely Someday..." (きっといつか..., Kittoitsuka)		1:40
25.	"Time of Trial" (試練の刻, Shiren no Koku)		1:59
26.	"And Before" (そして前へ, Soshite Maehe)		1:55
27.	"SummerDays ~piano arrange~"		1:52
28.	"SummerDays ~music box arrange~"		1:52
29.	"Knife or Saw? Part II"		2:09
30.	"Knife or Saw? Part II ~Introduce~"		1:49
31.	"Promise ~Girlhood's End~" (約束～Girlhood's End～, Yakusoku ~ Girlhood's End ~)	HIKO	4:16
Total length:			69:02
