= Overflow =

Overflow may refer to:

== Computing and telecommunications ==
- Integer overflow, a condition that occurs when an integer calculation produces a result that is greater than what a given register can store or represent
- Buffer overflow, a situation whereby the incoming data size exceeds that which can be accommodated by a buffer.
  - Heap overflow, a type of buffer overflow that occurs in the heap data area
- Overflow (software), a NASA-developed computational fluid dynamics program using overset (Chimera) grids
- Overflow condition, a situation that occurs when more information is being transmitted than the hardware can handle
- Overspill, a proof technique in non-standard analysis, is less commonly called overflow
- Stack overflow in which a computer program makes too many subroutine calls and its call stack runs out of space

== Other ==
- Overflow (company), a Japanese video game developer
- River overflow, a relatively long and significant increase in the water content of a river, causing a rise in its level
- Sanitary sewer overflow, a condition whereby untreated sewage is discharged into the environment, escaping wastewater treatment
- "Overflow", a 2023 song by Polaris from the album Fatalism
- "Overflow", a 2024 song by Linkin Park from the album From Zero
- The Overflow, New South Wales, Australia
