= Tenshi ni I'm Fine =

- Poster

Japanese name
- Kanji: 天使にアイム・ファイン
- Directed by: Hideto Sonoda
- Screenplay by: Hideto Sonoda
- Distributed by: Nikkatsu
- Release date: March 19, 2016
- Running time: 114 minutes
- Country: Japan
- Language: Japanese
- Box office: ¥58 million

Tenshi ni I'm Fine (Japanese: 天使にアイム・ファイン, lit. 'I'm Fine, My Angel' is a 2016 Japanese fantasy drama film written and directed by Hideto Sonoda. It was released in Japan by Nikkatsu on March 19, 2016.

It is an adaptation of the novel "I'm Fine" Spirit How To Get Through Tough Times (Note: This is the official English translated title. Original Japanese title:アイム・ファイン 自分らしくさわやかに生きる7つのステップ) by Ryuho Okawa, the founder of Happy Science.

== Plot ==
Five troubled people are given a helping hand by an angel. Fuka is a bullied 5th year elementary school student, Yuya lost his chance to go to university due to financial difficulties his late father's fruit and vegetable stand caused by his father's death from a nuclear accident, Yoshino a famous actress was revealed to be in the terminal stage of cancer, Mamoru who lost his willpower after losing an election, and Misato an aspiring actress whose sister died and lost sight of her future acting career.

Each of the five people have an angel from heaven who helps change these troubled people little by little.

== Cast ==
- Kirara
- Yoshimi Yashikawa
- Noboru Kaneko
- Kazuki Shimizu
- Miki Aika
- Nanako Ōkōchi
- Mizuho Takasugi

== Reception ==
The film reached the ninth place by admissions at the Japanese box office on its opening weekend, with 42,295 admissions and a gross of ¥58 million.
