= Dragon Heart: Adventures Beyond This World =

2025 animated fantasy film by Isamu Imakake

- Directed by: Isamu Imakake
- Based on: Dragon Heart: Adventures Beyond This World by Ryuho Okawa
- Starring: Chinatsu Hirose; Yūsuke Kobayashi
- Music by: Yūichi Mizusawa
- Production companies: HS Pictures Studio; IRH Productions
- Distributed by: Nikkatsu
- Release date: 23 May 2025 (Japan)
- Running time: 119 minutes
- Country: Japan
- Language: Japanese
- Box office: $1.7 million

Dragon Heart: Adventures Beyond This World (Japanese: ドラゴン・ハート―霊界探訪記, Hepburn: Dragon Heart: Reikai Tanbōki) is a 2025 Japanese animated fantasy film directed by Isamu Imakake.

== Plot ==
Ryūsuke Tagawa visits Tokushima and meets his cousin Tomomi Satō. They go to the Anabuki River and are swept away. A dragon rescues them and takes them to an old man who tells them that they are dead. He can resurrect them if they explore the spirit world and discover their mission in life.

== Cast ==
Character	Japanese cast	English dub cast
Tomomi Satō	Chinatsu Hirose	Ren Holly Liu
Ryūsuke Tagawa	Yūsuke Kobayashi	Zach Aguilar
Dōteiko Niangniang	Masumi Asano	Valerie Arem
Hebigami (Snake God)	Rika Fukami	Wendee Lee
Amanohi Washi no Mikoto	Shigeru Chiba	Rick Zieff
Vishnu	Shinichirō Miki	Jason Griffith
Adept	Shunsuke Takeuchi	Jason Griffith
Enma Daiō (King Yama)	Tetsuo Komura	Brook Chalmers

== Production ==
Happy Science, a new religious movement in Japan, has produced multiple animated films. Ryuho Okawa was the executive producer and created the original story in 2019. Preproduction lasted three years before production on Dragon Heart: Adventures Beyond This World started in 2022.

IRH Productions animated the film and some work was outsourced to other Japanese animation companies. 3D animation was initially used for the dragon, but hand-drawn animation was added over it.

== Release ==
Dragon Heart was released in Japan by Nikkatsu on 23 May 2025, and in Taiwan on 12 September. Freestyle Releasing acquired the digital and theatrical rights for the film in the United States. Bang Zoom! created the English dub for the film.

In its opening week the film debuted sixth in the Japanese box office with $825,368. The film has earned $1,736,441 at the box office, with $1,694,623 internationally and $41,818 in North America.

== Reception ==
Christie Cronan, writing for Common Sense Media, gave the film four out of five stars.

Dragon Heart is among the 35 films eligible for consideration for the Academy Award for Best Animated Feature at the 98th Academy Awards.

== Works cited ==
=== News ===
- "How spirituality infused the making of Japanese animation 'Dragon Heart: Adventures Beyond This World'". Screen Daily. 26 November 2025. Archived from the original on 28 November 2025.
- Jackson, Destiny (15 November 2025). "Director Isamu Imakake Talks Creating "Euphoria" & "Spiritual Awakening" In 'Dragon Heart: Adventures Beyond This World' – Contenders Los Angeles". Deadline Hollywood. Archived from the original on 28 November 2025.
- Lin, Kunwei (29 July 2025). "《龍之心-靈界探訪記-》9月接棒《鬼滅》 開啟異界旅程震撼心靈". TVBS News. Archived from the original on 28 November 2025.
- Mateo, Alex (28 January 2025). "Le film Dragon Heart de l'organisme religieux Happy Science sera dévoilé lors de l'AnimeJapan 2025". Anime News Network. Archived from the original on 9 February 2025.
- Milligan, Mercedes (21 November 2025). "Oscars: 35 Animated Features Make Academy Awards Consideration Cut". Animation Magazine. Archived from the original on 28 November 2025.
- Ntim, Zac; Wiseman, Andreas (9 May 2025). "Animated Japanese Flick 'Dragon Heart – Adventures Beyond This World' Lands U.S. Release Via Freestyle". Deadline Hollywood. Archived from the original on 10 May 2025.
- Pineda, Rafael (4 June 2025). "Jujutsu Kaisen Season 2 Compilation Film Opens at #4 in Japan". Anime News Network. Archived from the original on 28 November 2025.

=== Web ===
- "Dragon Heart – Adventures Beyond This World (movie)". Anime News Network. Archived from the original on 28 November 2025.
- "Dragon Heart – Adventures Beyond This World (2025)". The Numbers.
- "Dragon Heart: Adventures Beyond This World (2025)". Box Office Mojo.
- Cronan, Christie. "Dragon Heart: Adventures Beyond This World". Common Sense Media. Archived from the original on 28 November 2025.
