= The Real Exorcist =

2020 Japanese film

- Film poster
- 心霊喫茶『エクストラ』の秘密
- Directed by: Shokyo Oda
- Based on: The Real Exorcist by Ryuho Okawa
- Starring: Fumika Shimizu
- Edited by: Hirohide Abe
- Music by: Yuichi Mizusawa
- Production company: HS Productions
- Distributed by: Nikkatsu
- Release date: August 28, 2020
- Running time: 108 minutes
- Country: Japan
- Language: Japanese
- Box office: $2,317,373

The Real Exorcist (Japanese: 心霊喫茶『エクストラ』の秘密, lit. 'The Secret of Extra, Café of the Soul') is a film produced by HS Productions. The film follows the story of a young woman named Sayuri (Japanese: 小百合, lit. 'Lily') as she becomes an exorcist following being helped by the owner of a café named Extra after a panic attack. It stayed on the top of the Japanese box office for four weeks straight.

== Plot ==
Sayuri walks into an alley following a panic attack caused by her ability to see evil spirits and ghosts. One of the owners of a nearby café named Extra, Yumeko, finds Sayuri crouching in distress and asks if she is okay.

After a child suffering a mysterious wound on her cheek while riding her bicycle, her mother brings her to Extra, where she meets Sayuri, who is working there out of gratitude to Yumeko. Sayuri hears about what happened to the child, then uses her powers to envision the incident. Sayuri states that the bicycle was red, which the girl did not mention, proving that she possesses supernatural powers. She explains what happened, and the mother thanks her.

A man named Isamu is mugged, losing the money he just made, and contemplates suicide as he walks into Extra. Sayuri offers Isamu coffee and he tells her about the mugging and that the police said the money may be irrecoverable. Sayuri uses her supernatural powers and tells Isamu where the thief lives and that he should go recover his money. Isamu is doubtful, but Sayuri says the thief feels extremely guilty for his crime and that he will return the money.

In a high school restroom, a group of girls is frightened by a ghostly voice saying that it wants to die. They quickly leave and go to Extra, where they meet Sayuri. One of the girls notices that she forgot her phone, and the girls panic about how to get it back from the restroom. Sayuri listens to the girls' story and gives her business card, telling them to contact her if anything goes wrong.

Later that night, the girls go back to school to grab the phone and see the door close itself. Scared, they call Sayuri, who runs to the school, with Isamu following. Sayuri makes the ghost show itself; it is a student who died by suicide three years prior due to poor grades, and she said that she wanted to die after she saw a living student in the restroom take out a similar report card. Sayuri uses her supernatural powers to send the ghost to her next life.

The next day, Isamu goes shopping with his girlfriend Kyoka. Isamu tells her about the event, but Kyoka ridicules him. Isamu notices Sayuri shopping nearby and tries to get Kyoka to leave. Just as they are about to, Kyoka receives a call telling her that a little girl in their family has disappeared. Isamu gets Sayuri's help and the little girl is found. Kyoka is happy that the girl has been found, but feels uneasy about Sayuri's powers.

Later, Isamu asks about Sayuri's origins. Sayuri reveals that she was helped after collapsing next to Extra, and was given books regarding exorcism—actually books by Happy Science—that improved her confidence. She offers Isamu the opportunity to help her. Kyoka jealously stares at the pair, as another woman lurks behind her.

Kyoka goes for an audition, which she fails at, along with another actress, who was also the woman lurking behind her. Later, the other model tells Kyoka to tell Isamu to stay away from Sayuri out of fear that she may be using witchcraft to steal him from Kyoka, as the audience sees her glitch.

Later, Kyoka and Isamu argue about his spending time with Sayuri; Kyoka demands that he show her their chat history, only to find generic conversations. She tells him to stay away from Sayuri, which he laughs off. Meanwhile, Sayuri performs more exorcisms, even summoning the dead and expelling evil spirits. That night, the actress, who is actually a demon, enters Sayuri's dreams and tries to convince her to give up her exorcism, only to fail.

After Kyoka sends an angry text, the demon starts possessing her. She tries to read a sutra to repel the demon, but is possessed before she manages to pick it up. She rushes out and attempts to kill her mother. Afterward, she runs to the rooftop as instructed by the demon and attempts to commit suicide, as her mother tries to hold her back. Isamu arrives and helps Kyoka's mother restrain Kyoka, as Isamu calls Sayuri. Sayuri goes to Kyoka's apartment and expels the demon, and in the morning, she and Kyoka reconcile.

The next day, the three chat at Extra. Two people then come in to ask for Sayuri's help, and the camera pans to a shot of the original book on a bookshelf.

== Cast ==
- Fumika Shimizu as Sayuri, an exorcist and Extra employee.
- Mirai Irako as Isamu, a regular and friend of Sayuri whom she helped to reclaim his money. He is also Kyoka's boyfriend.
- Rin Kijima as Kyoka, Isamu's boyfriend and an actress. She used to be jealous of Sayuri but is now friends with her.
- Joe Hyuga as a master coffee brewer and one of the owners of Extra.
- Nao Hasegawa as Yumeko, one of the owners of Extra.
- Ryuchi Ohura as Onodera, a deceased doctor whom Sayuri helps reach heaven.
- Yoshimi Ashikawa as Ruriko, Kyoka's mother and an attempted victim while possessed.
- Ayumi Orii as Melephis, the demon who possesses Kyoka in an attempt to stop Sayuri's exorcism. She is later defeated by Sayuri.

== Awards ==
Awards and nominations for The Real Exorcist
Year	Organisation	Award	Person	Result	Ref.
2020	LAFA Awards	Best Actress	Fumika Shimizu	Won	
2020	EKO International Film Festival in Nigeria	Best Supporting Actress	Rin Kijima	Won	
2020	17th Monaco International Film Festival	Best Supporting Actor	Rin Kijima	Won	
