= The Rebirth of Buddha =

- Directed by: Takaaki Ishiyama
- Written by: Hiroshi Ohkawa
- Screenplay by: Hiroshi Ohkawa
- Based on: The Rebirth of Buddha by Ryuho Okawa
- Produced by: Ryuho Okawa
- Starring: Ami Koshimizu; Takehito Koyasu; Hiroyuki Yoshino; Ryōtarō Okiayu; Ryoko Shiraishi
- Music by: Yūichi Mizusawa
- Production companies: Group TAC; Happy Science
- Distributed by: Toei Company
- Release date: 17 October 2009 (Japan)
- Running time: 115 minutes
- Country: Japan
- Language: Japanese

The Rebirth of Buddha (仏陀再誕, Buddasaitan; lit. 'Buddha's Return') is a Japanese animated movie produced by the new religious movement, Happy Science. It is an adaptation of a book by Ryuho Okawa, the CEO of Happy Science, and was released on October 17, 2009.

This movie was planned to be released internationally, dubbed into six languages and subtitled in twelve languages.

== Plot ==
In Tokyo, 17-year-old school journalist Sayako Amanokawa is finishing an article about her idol, news anchor Mari Kimura. One day, Sayako learns that Tokuzo Kanemoto, a reporter she idolized, has committed suicide. Shortly after, she begins seeing malevolent spirits everywhere, including Kanemoto's, who pulls her into the metro railway but is saved by Yuki, her boyfriend. Sayako recounts that in that brief moment she saw Kanemoto being judged in the afterlife and recalls something about the return of Buddha. Yuki not only believes her, but explains further the nature of human existence and the afterlife, including how suicide victims become malevolent spirits. Sayako asks him about the origin of his knowledge, but he refuses to elaborate. This and Yuki's recurrent periods of absence prompt her to end their relationship.

Sayako is invited to interview Tosaku Arai, the leader of the religious group Sonen, who has gained fame for claiming to be Buddha's reincarnation and demonstrating psychic powers. Attending Arai's sermon at the Sonen temple, Sayako is taken out by Yuki, confronting security on the way. Yuki explains that Arai is a false prophet and that the real Buddha is Master Taiyou Sorano, the leader of the TSI group of which he is a member. As they argue, Sayako's younger brother Shunta falls deeply ill as a result of demon possession, with Dr. Amanokawa, their father, being unable to cure him. Sayako meets the rest of the TSI group, which to her delight includes Mari Kimura, herself a former follower of Arai until she was saved by Sorano, who is finally introduced to her family. Sorano performs an exorcism on Shunta, revealing that the demon works for Arai and that Sayako has been endowed with spirit vision to fulfill an important mission. Sorano in his sermons proclaims love and selflessness, the opposite of Arai.

While Sayako, Yuki and Shunta attend a festival to celebrate the boy's recovery, Arai uses his psychic powers to induce a collective hallucination of an alien invasion. Amid the chaos, Sayako uses the power of Sorano's enlightenment to dissipate the illusion, transforming the alien mothership into a gigantic lotus flower. Witness accounts and video footage turn her into a national hero, making the public skeptical of allegations from Sonen that it was Arai who thwarted the invasion. Arai tries again conjuring a 200-meter-tall tsunami, offering salvation in exchange of complete subservience to him. The conspiracy is exposed by the TSI, countering Arai's mind control by making Sayako speak on live TV while channeling Sorano.

Trying to evade reporters and her unwanted fame, Sayako is kidnapped by Arai and brought to a baseball stadium. On a hovering platform, Arai threatens Sayako to kill all 50,000 attendants with explosives if she does not publicly declare him to be Buddha. Though hesitant at first, Sayako gathers the courage to proclaim that Sorano is the real Buddha, making Arai throw her off the platform. However, she is rescued by Yuki and the TSI before she falls to her death, rendering her unconscious. Just as Sorano arrives and faces Arai, he is revealed to be demon-possessed. An intense spiritual battle ensues and the demon is ultimately vanished. Arai, now free, is deeply sorry and forgiven by Sorano, now known to be Buddha to everyone. Sayako reawakens, just as Yuki proclaims his love for her. Sorano also reveals that Sayako, Yuki and the rest of the TSI are reincarnations of his disciples from 2,500 years ago.

TSI members continue spreading Buddha's teachings throughout the world, while Arai is imprisoned but grateful for his enlightenment. Sayako becomes a journalist and leaves her family's home to live with Yuki.

== Characters ==
- Sayako Amanokawa (天の川 清子, Amanokawa Sayako; voiced by: Ami Koshimizu). A good-natured 17-year-old student interested in journalism. She is endowed by Buddha with the power to see spirits.
- Taiyou Sorano (ソラノ 太陽, Sorano Taiyou; voiced by: Takehito Koyasu). The true reincarnation of Buddha, currently head of the TSI. He preaches altruism, selflessness, and love.
- Tousaku Arai, voiced by: Banjou Ginga. The leader of the Sonen group, falsely proclaiming to be Buddha and preaching selfishness in his sermons. He has enormous psychic powers as a result of being possessed by a demon.
- Yuki Unabara (海原 由紀, Unabara Yuki; voiced by: Hiroyuki Yoshino). Sayako's short-tempered boyfriend, a member of the TSI. He initially conceals belonging to the group out of fear that Sayako will reject him.
- Shunta Amanokawa (天の川 太郎, Amanokawa Shunta; voiced by: Ryoko Shiraishi). Sayako's mischievous younger brother.
- Mari Kimura (キメラ マリ, Kimura Mari; voiced by: Kotono Mitsuishi). A news anchor and actress idolized by Sayako. She is a former follower of Sonen, until she began following Sorano because his teachings actually helped her obtain happiness.
- Harry Badson (ハリー・バドソン, Harī Badoson; voiced by: Ryotaro Okiayu). An Australian member of the TSI with an excitable personality.
- Ippei Amanokawa (天の川 一平, Amanokawa Ippei; voiced by: Hirohiko Kakegawa). Sayako's father and doctor who is adamantly skeptical of religion before Sorano saves Shunta.
- Mrs. Amanokawa (天の川 サン, Amanokawa-san; voiced by: Miki Itou). Sayako's mother.
- Tokuzo Kanemoto (金元 徳蔵, Kanemoto Tokuzo; voiced by: Hiroki Yasumoto). A reporter that Sayako looked up to who commits suicide for the shame of publishing a wildly inaccurate article. He is judged in the afterlife for disbelieving in religion and condemned to wander his expected natural lifetime as a miserable spirit on Earth.
- Mysterious Shaman (神秘的なシャーマン, Nazo no Shaman; voiced by: Ako Mayama). A Native American elder who occasionally aids and defends the TSI. She also appears in The Laws of Eternity, another film by Happy Science.
- Takeshi Komayama (コマヤマ 武, Komayama Takeshi; voiced by: Shigeru Chiba). The spokesman for the Sonen group.
- Kaori (カオリ, Kaori; voiced by: Hisayo Yanai). Sayako's friend.
- Mami (マミ, Mami; voiced by: Touko Aoyama). Sayako's friend.
- Tomoko (トモコ, Tomoko; voiced by: Satsuki Yukino). Sayako's friend.
- Rina (リナ, Rina; voiced by: Makiko Ohmoto). Sayako's friend.
