= List of 2020 box office number-one films in Japan =

The following is a list of 2020 box office number-one films in Japan by week. When the number-one film in gross is not the same as the number-one film in admissions, both are listed.

== Number-one films ==
†	This implies the highest-grossing movie of the year.

Week #	Date	Film	Gross	Notes
1	January 5, 2020	Frozen II	US$4,590,139	
2	January 12, 2020	Frozen II	US$3,149,947	
3	January 19, 2020	Kaiji: Final Game	US$2,042,951	
4	January 26, 2020	Cats	US$2,398,741	
5	February 2, 2020	AI Amok	US$2,460,545	
6	February 9, 2020	Wotakoi: Love is Hard for Otaku	US$2,090,206	
7	February 16, 2020	Parasite	US$3,384,292	
8	February 23, 2020	Parasite	US$2,635,990	
9	March 1, 2020	Parasite	US$1,539,797	
10	March 8, 2020	Fukushima 50	US$1,353,701	
11	March 15, 2020	Fukushima 50	US$1,002,781	
12	March 22, 2020	Not Quite Dead Yet	US$773,912	
Japanese cinemas closed and box office reporting suspended due to the COVID-19 pandemic
20	May 17, 2020	Parasite	US$9,829	
21	May 24, 2020	The Real Exorcist	US$585,297	
22	May 31, 2020	The Real Exorcist	US$608,414	
23	June 7, 2020	The Real Exorcist	US$726,547	
24	June 14, 2020	The Real Exorcist	US$397,115	
25	June 21, 2020	Dolittle	US$1,058,837	
26	June 28, 2020	Dolittle	US$727,340	
27	July 5, 2020	Spirited Away	US$866,088	
28	July 12, 2020	Spirited Away	US$811,615	
29	July 19, 2020	From Today, It's My Turn the Movie!	US$5,892,004	
30	July 26, 2020	From Today, It's My Turn the Movie!	US$4,657,800	
31	August 2, 2020	From Today, It's My Turn the Movie!	US$2,592,200	
32	August 9, 2020	Doraemon: Nobita's New Dinosaur	US$3,879,000	
33	August 16, 2020	Fate/stay night: Heaven's Feel III. spring song	US$4,461,300	
34	August 23, 2020	Threads: Our Tapestry of Love	US$2,197,800	
35	August 30, 2020	Stigmatized Properties	US$3,362,500	
36	September 6, 2020	Stigmatized Properties	US$2,407,000	
37	September 13, 2020	Crayon Shin-chan: Crash! Rakuga Kingdom and Almost Four Heroes	US$2,478,000	
38	September 20, 2020	Tenet	US$3,112,000	
39	September 27, 2020	Tenet	US$2,332,800	
40	October 4, 2020	Tenet	US$1,988,000	In gross
40	October 4, 2020	The Asadas	US$1,628,400	In attendance
41	October 11, 2020	Tenet	US$1,610,900	
42	October 18, 2020	Demon Slayer: Kimetsu no Yaiba the Movie: Mugen Train †	US$31,832,300	
43	October 25, 2020	Demon Slayer: Kimetsu no Yaiba the Movie: Mugen Train †	US$28,994,300	
44	November 1, 2020	Demon Slayer: Kimetsu no Yaiba the Movie: Mugen Train †	US$23,851,600	
45	November 8, 2020	Demon Slayer: Kimetsu no Yaiba the Movie: Mugen Train †	US$17,055,100	
46	November 15, 2020	Demon Slayer: Kimetsu no Yaiba the Movie: Mugen Train †	US$14,564,700	
47	November 22, 2020	Demon Slayer: Kimetsu no Yaiba the Movie: Mugen Train †	US$9,879,600	
47	November 29, 2020	Demon Slayer: Kimetsu no Yaiba the Movie: Mugen Train †	US$9,667,900	
48	December 6, 2020	Demon Slayer: Kimetsu no Yaiba the Movie: Mugen Train †	US$6,302,600	
49	December 13, 2020	Demon Slayer: Kimetsu no Yaiba the Movie: Mugen Train †	US$9,038,300	
50	December 20, 2020	Demon Slayer: Kimetsu no Yaiba the Movie: Mugen Train †	US$3,766,200	
51	December 27, 2020	Demon Slayer: Kimetsu no Yaiba the Movie: Mugen Train †	US$8,777,200	

== Highest-grossing films ==
International film Japanese film

Highest-grossing films of 2020 in Japan
Rank	Title	Gross
1	Demon Slayer: Kimetsu no Yaiba the Movie: Mugen Train	¥36.55 billion ($342.31 million)
2	Star Wars: The Rise of Skywalker	¥7.32 billion ($68.56 million)
3	From Today, It's My Turn the Movie!	¥5.37 billion ($50.29 million)
4	Parasite	¥4.74 billion ($44.39 million)
5	The Confidence Man JP: Episode of the Princess	¥3.84 billion ($35.96 million)
6	Doraemon: Nobita's New Dinosaur	¥3.35 billion ($31.37 million)
7	Tenet	¥2.73 billion ($25.57 million)
8	Stigmatized Properties	¥2.34 billion ($21.92 million)
9	Threads: Our Tapestry of Love	¥2.27 billion ($21.26 million)
10	Violet Evergarden: The Movie	¥2.13 billion ($19.95 million)

== See also ==
- List of Japanese films of 2020
