= Happiness Realization Party =

Happiness Realization Party 幸福実現党
- Leader: Hiroko Matsune (a.k.a. Ryoko Shaku)
- President: Vacant
- Chairman: Hironori Matsushima
- Secretary: Hironori Matsushima
- Spokesperson: Hiroko Nanami
- Secretary general: Tadahiko Saito
- Founder: Ryuho Okawa
- Founded: 23 May 2009
- Headquarters: 6th floor of Utopia Activity Promotion Hall, Akasaka 2-10-8, Minato Ward, Tokyo, Japan
- Ideology: Radical conservatism
- Political position: Right-wing to far-right
- Religion: Happy Science
- Colours: Blue; Yellow
- Councillors: 0 / 242
- Representatives: 0 / 465

Website
- en.hr-party.jp

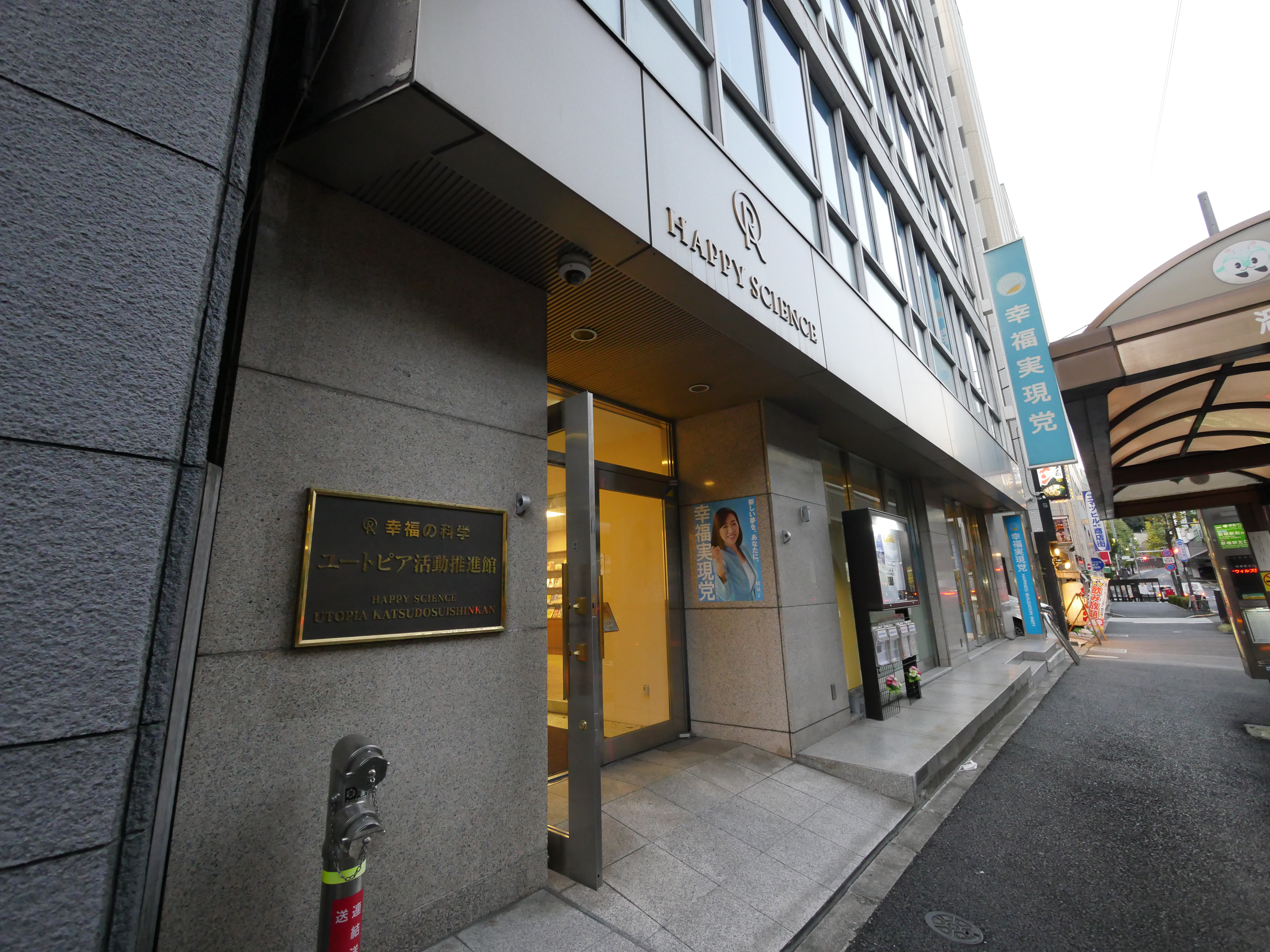
Party headquarters in Akasaka, Minato Ward, Tokyo

The Happiness Realization Party (Japanese: 幸福実現党, Hepburn: Kōfuku Jitsugen-tō), abbreviated as Kōfuku (幸福), is a Japanese political party founded by Ryuho Okawa on 23 May 2009. The HRP is the political wing of the conservative Happy Science religious movement, which is widely regarded as a cult.

Okawa was the president of the party until his death on 2 March 2023.

== Electoral history ==
In 2009, the party had 345 candidates, placing it on the ballots of 99% of Japan's 300 constituencies. Many perennial candidates such as Yoshiro Nakamatsu joined the HRP. Despite fielding a total of more than 1 million votes, the party did not win any seats in the election.

In 2012, the party again failed to gain any seats.

As of April 2018, the party had 21 elected local councilors.

== Policies ==
According to its manifesto, the group's goal is to more than double Japan's population to 300 million through making child-rearing easier for mothers and accepting foreigners as workforce. It also aims to change the pacifist Article 9 of the Japanese Constitution in order to increase Japan's economic and military power.

The group identifies itself as "conservative" and is generally considered a right-wing, or a radical right party. The party advocates a nuclear deterrent for Japan, denies that the Nanjing Massacre occurred and has called for China to be expelled from the United Nations Security Council. The party has formed links to the American right, having attended the Conservative Political Action Conference in 2012, and bringing with them members of the Tokyo Tea Party, supporting low tax.

In 2022, the party has expressed sympathy for Russia's position following the Invasion of Ukraine, criticizing the Ukrainian President Volodymyr Zelenskyy.

== Administration ==
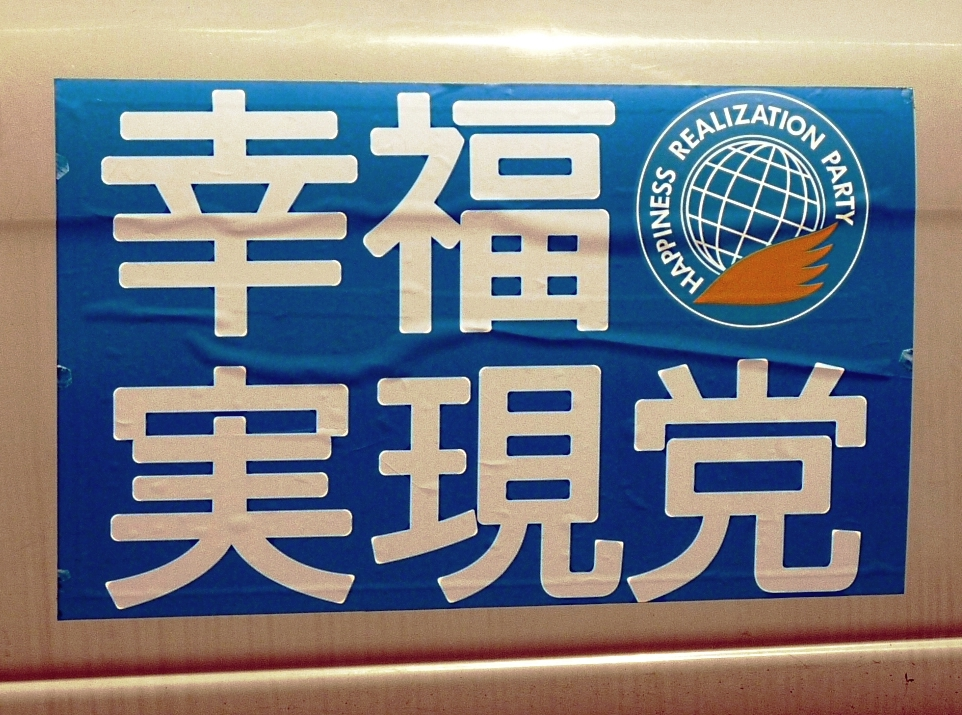
Happiness Realization Party car sticker. Kyoto. 2010

Jay Aeba, also known as Jikido Aeba (饗庭直道, あえば直道, Aeba Jikido), was, of May 2012, advisor of the Republican National Committee of the United States in charge of Asia, with Yuki Oikawa as one of the officials of HRP.

== President ==
No.	Image	Name	Took office	Left office
1		Ryuho Okawa	22 July 2009	12 September 2009
-	-	(Vacant)	12 September 2009	27 December 2012
2		Ryuho Okawa	27 December 2012	2 March 2023

== Leaders ==
No.	Image	Name	Took office	Left office
1		Jikidō Aeba	23 May 2009	4 June 2009
2		Kyōko Ōkawa	4 June 2009	29 July 2009
-	-	(Vacant)	29 July 2009	2 September 2009
3		Zuishō Motochikawa	2 September 2009	12 September 2009
4		Tomoshige Kimura	12 September 2009	15 April 2010
5		Sōken Kobayashi	15 April 2010	21 April 2010
6		Etsuo Ishikawa	21 April 2010	20 July 2010
7		Shugaku Tsuiki	20 July 2010	27 December 2012
8		Hissho Yanai	27 December 2012	24 July 2013
9		Ryōko Shaku	24 July 2013	Incumbent

== Criticism ==
According to The Japan Times, "for many, the Happies smell suspiciously like a cult". The party has released promotional videos that claim North Korea and China are plotting to invade and colonize Japan after first subduing it through nuclear warfare.

The party has been accused of expressing anti-Korean sentiment, although they deny this. However, they deny that Koreans were forced to labor in World War II, and deny that comfort women (many of whom were Korean) were forced to perform their work. To this end, Okawa once said that:

Those Koreans who presented sob stories decades later were plucked from weepy funerals and "bribed" to blacken Japan’s name, such lies now being firmly "embedded in Korean culture".
