= The Laws of the Universe =

Japanese animated film series

- Laws of the Universe
- Theatrical release poster
- Genre: Science fiction
- Created by: Happy Science
- Anime film series
- Directed by: Isamu Imakake
- Produced by: Ryuho Okawa, Stan Lee
- Music by: Yūichi Mizusawa
- Studio: HS Pictures Studio
- Licensed by: NA: Eleven Arts
- Released: October 10, 2015 – October 8, 2021
- Runtime: 2 hours
- Films: 3

The Laws of the Universe (Japanese: UFO学園の秘密 Hepburn: UFO Gakuen no Himitsu) is a Japanese animated film series consisting of three films, produced by HS Pictures Studio. The first film in the series, titled The Laws of the Universe: Part 0, was released on October 10, 2015. The anime has been licensed by Eleven Arts.

== Plot ==
A group of five junior high school students are wrapped up in a strange occurrence, involving an alien species called Grey.

== Cast ==
Character
Character	Japanese voice actor	English dubbing actor
Ray	Ryota Osaka	Josh Keaton
Anna	Asami Seto	Kari Wahlgren
Tyler	Tetsuya Kakihara	Yuri Lowenthal
Halle	Hisako Kanemoto	Hynden Walch
Eisuke	Wataru Hatano	Roger Craig Smith
Suguru Yoake	Daisuke Namikawa	Dylan McDermott
Inkar	Miki Itō	Jennifer Beals
Marui	Banjō Ginga	Fred Tatasciore
Yanase	Yutaka Nakano	Dave Fennoy
Ummite	Issei Futamata	Tom Kenny
Goat-type Alien	Hiroshi Shirokuma	Beau Billingslea
Natsumi	Haruka Chisuga	Stephanie Sheh
Takamine	Takahiro Fujiwara	Patrick Seitz
Shizuka	Marie Miyake	Dorothy Fahn

== Production ==
A promotional video of the prologue, The Laws of the Universe: Part 0, first streamed on July 23, 2015. The movie series was produced by HS Pictures Studio, which is operated by Happy Science, a controversial new religious and spiritual movement. Ryuho Okawa, the founder of Happy Science, was reported to be directly overseeing production of the movie series. A sequel to Part 0, The Laws of the Universe Part 1, premiered at the Awareness Film Festival in Los Angeles on October 6, 2018.

== Reception ==
The Laws of the Universe: Part 0 was critically panned by anime critics. Charles Solomon of Los Angeles Times described the movie as "messy", and that "it follows no rules". Solomon also commented that the movie is something only Okawa followers could enjoy.
