= Happy Science =

New religious movement founded in Japan by Ryuho Okawa

Happy Science 幸福の科学
- Happy Science logo
- Formation: 6 October 1986; 40 years ago
- Founders: Ryuho Okawa
- Type: Japanese new religious movement
- Headquarters: 1-2-38 Higashi Gotanda, Shinagawa-ku, Tokyo 141-0022, Japan
- Members: 11 million (self-claimed); 38,000 (JGSS survey estimate); 30,000 (Kyoko Okawa's estimate); 13,000 (Hirohiro Okawa's estimate)
- Master: Ryuho Okawa
- Website: happy-science.org
- Formerly called: The Institute for Research in Human Happiness (until 2008) (Note: The Institute for Research in Human Happiness was the official English name until 2008, while the Japanese name was, and continues to be, "Happy Science" (幸福の科学). The English name was abbreviated IRH or IRHH.)

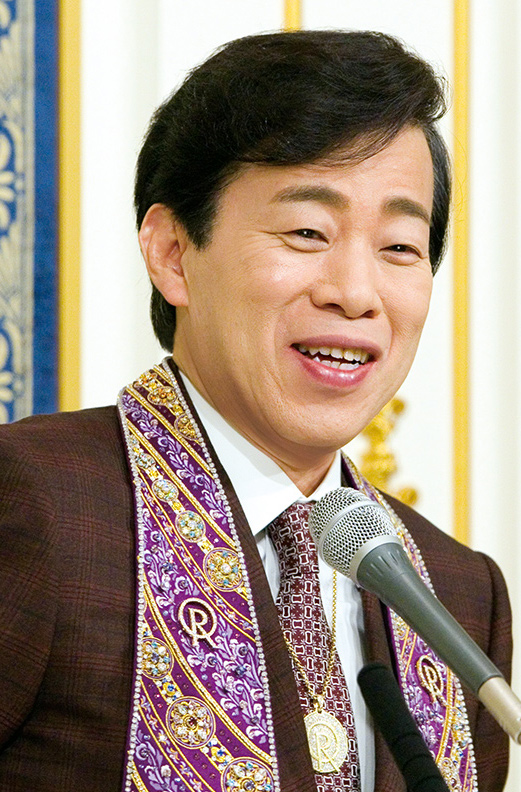
Ryuho Okawa, 15 February 2015

Happy Science (幸福の科学, Kōfuku-no-Kagaku), formerly known as the Institute for Research in Human Happiness, is a new religious movement founded in Japan on 6 October 1986 by former Wall Street trader Ryuho Okawa, whose followers regarded him as the incarnation of a supreme being from Venus. Happy Science has been described as a cult.

The Happy Science group includes a publication division called IRH Press, schools such as Happy Science Academy and Happy Science University, a political party called the Happiness Realization Party, and three media entertainment divisions, which are called New Star Production, ARI Production and HS Pictures Studio.

== History ==
On 15 July 1986, Ryuho Okawa resigned from his position at TOMEN Corporation (now Toyota Tsusho) to found his own organization on October 6, which he dubbed Happy Science; the Japanese government did not certify it as a religious organization until 7 March 1991. According to Ryuho Okawa, its aim is "to bring happiness to humanity by spreading truth". Before its foundation, Ryuho Okawa had published various books of "spiritual messages" that claim to channel the words spoken by religious and historical figures such as Jesus Christ, Confucius and Nichiren. In 1987, he printed The Laws of the Sun, The Golden Laws, and The Laws of Eternity, forming the core textbooks of Happy Science, along with its fundamental sutra The Dharma of the Right Mind.

== Teachings ==
The basic teachings of Happy Science are "Exploration of the Right Mind", "The Fourfold Path", and El Cantare belief. According to Okawa, in order to obtain happiness one must practice the Principles of Happiness known as "The Fourfold Path": love that gives, wisdom, self-reflection, and progress. The only requirement to join Happy Science is that applicants must have "the aspiration and discipline to seek the truth and actively contribute to the realization of love, peace and happiness on Earth". Among other teachings, they believe in the existence of reincarnation, angels, demons, heaven and hell, and aliens. Members of Happy Science attend training courses (kenshūkai (研修会)) and "qualification seminars" (資格セミナー, shikaku seminā) in order to increase their level within the group's hierarchy.

At the same time, the organization's political wing, the Happiness Realization Party, promotes political views that include support for Japanese military expansion, support for the use of nuclear deterrence, and denial of historical events such as the Nanjing Massacre in China and the comfort women issue in South Korea. Some other stances include support of infrastructure spending, natural disaster prevention, urban development, and dam construction. They also advocate fiscal conservatism, strengthening the US-Japan alliance, and a virtue-based leadership. As of 2018, the Happiness Realization Party had 21 local councilors.

=== Object of worship ===
Happy Science worships a deity named El Cantare who they believe is the "Highest God of Earth, the Lord of all gods". They believe that the being was first born on Earth 330 million years ago and that it is the same entity that has been worshipped at different times as Elohim, Odin, Thoth, Ophealis (Osiris), Hermes and Shakyamuni Buddha, with Okawa himself as the current incarnation.

== Facilities ==
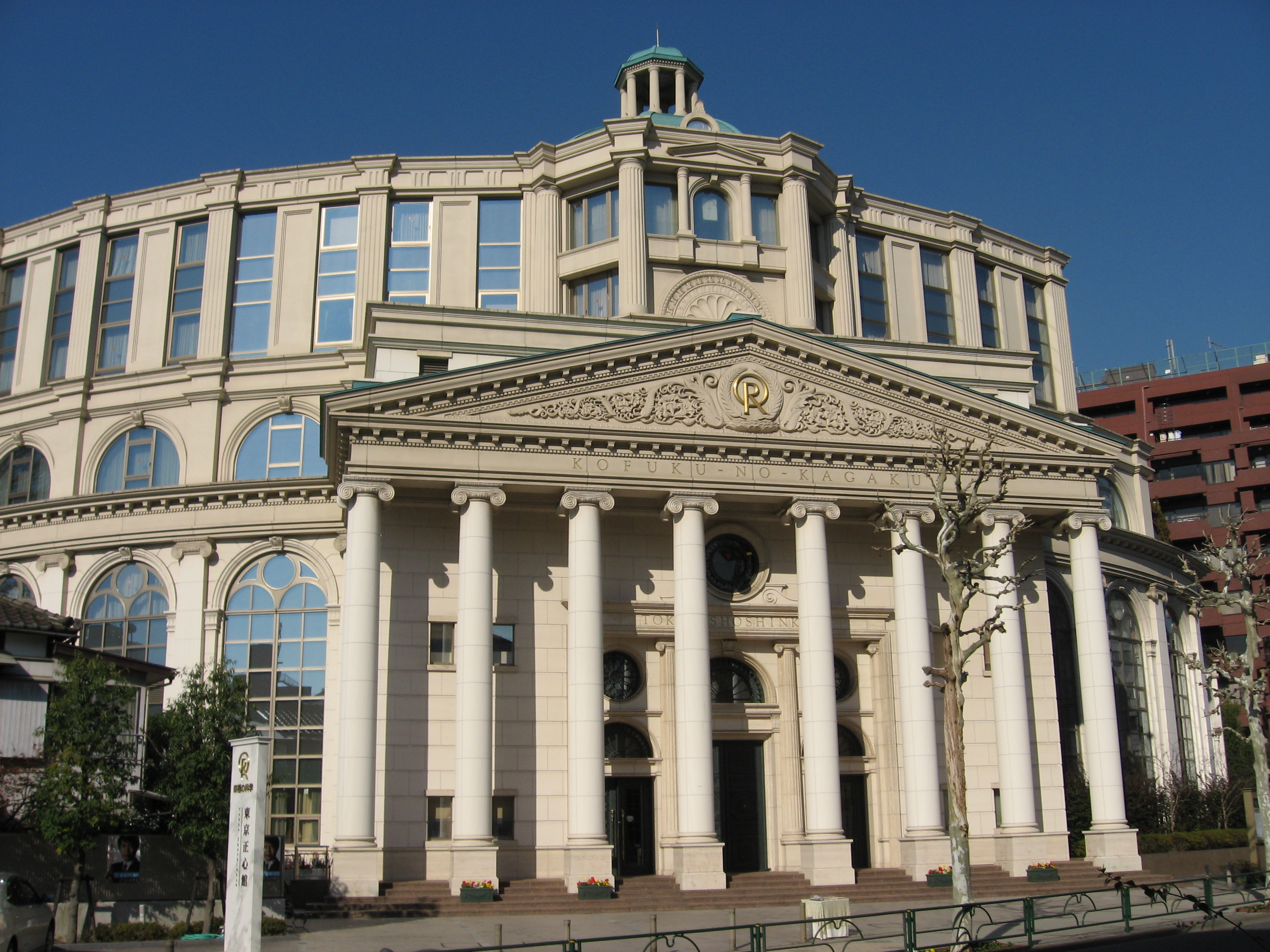
Tokyo Shoshinkan in Sengakuji

General headquarters, worship facilities, and missionary sites are located in Japan and other countries. Worship facilities are called Shoja (精舎 or vihara in Sanskrit) or Shoshinkan (正心館). In 1994, the first overseas branch, "Happiness Science USA" was established in New York. The organisation has branches in several countries including South Korea, Brazil, Uganda, the UK, Australia, Germany, India and Singapore. In addition to places of worship, Happy Science also operates two boarding schools in Nasu and Ōtsu, Japan.

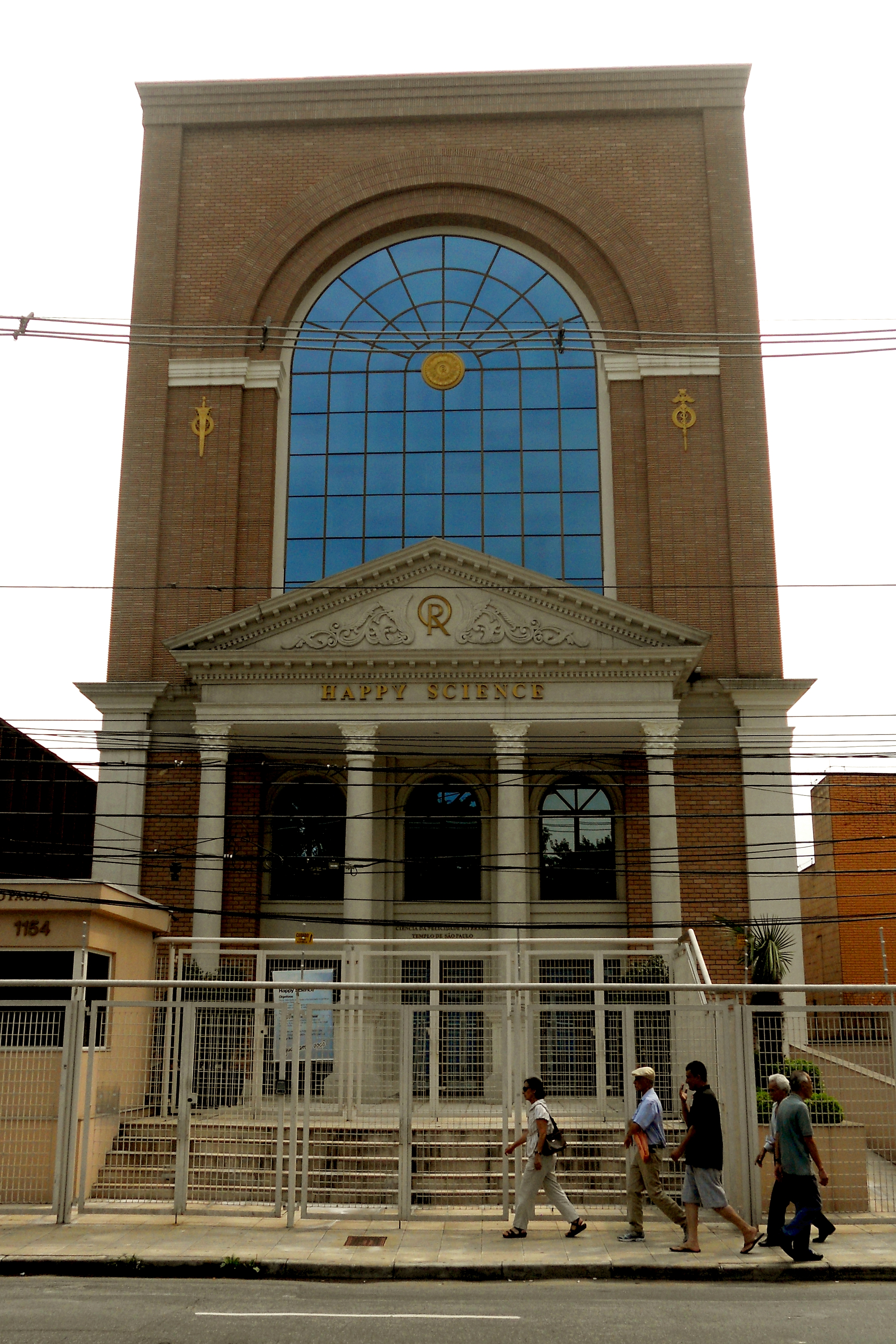
Brazil Shoshinkan

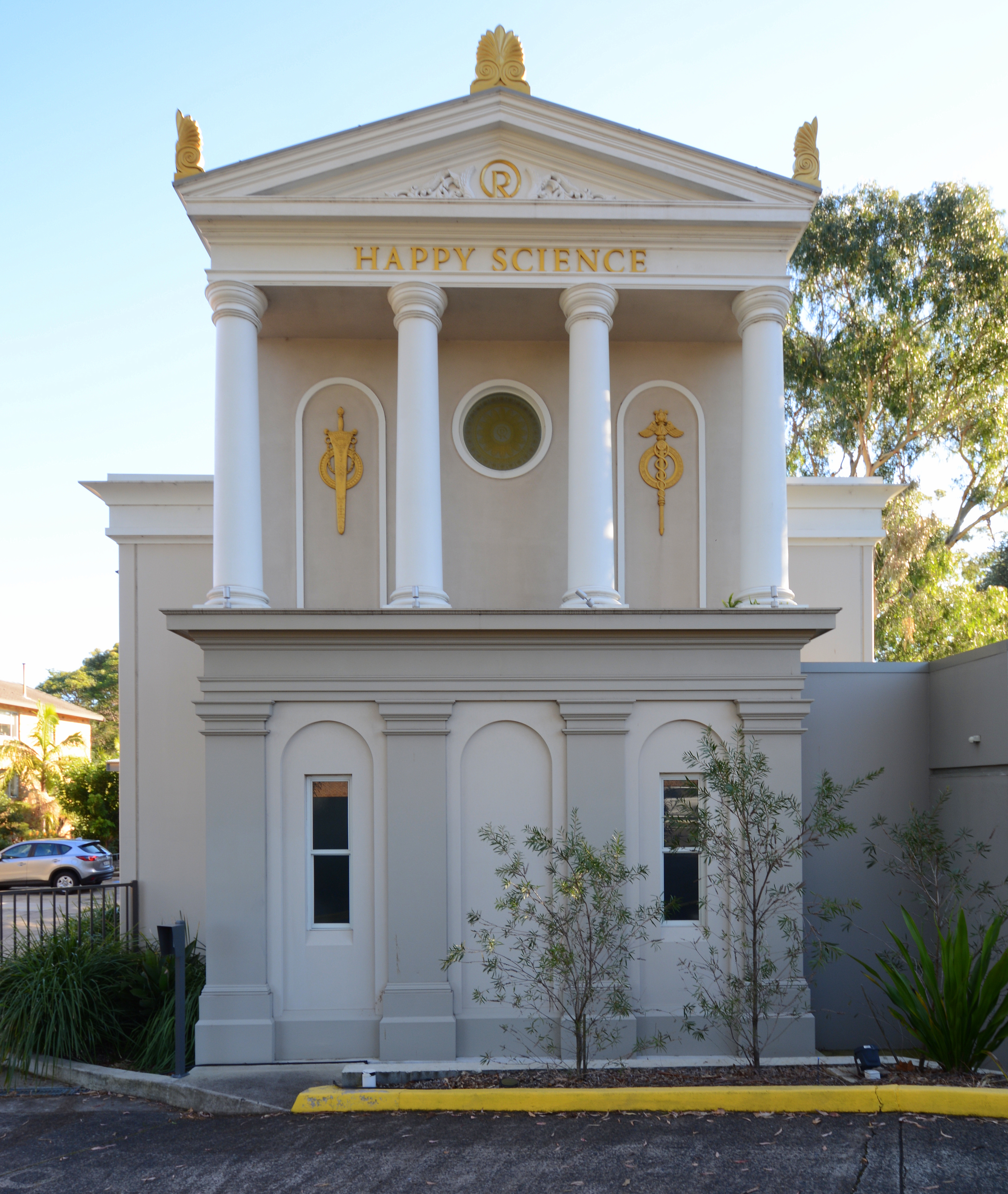
Sydney Local Branch

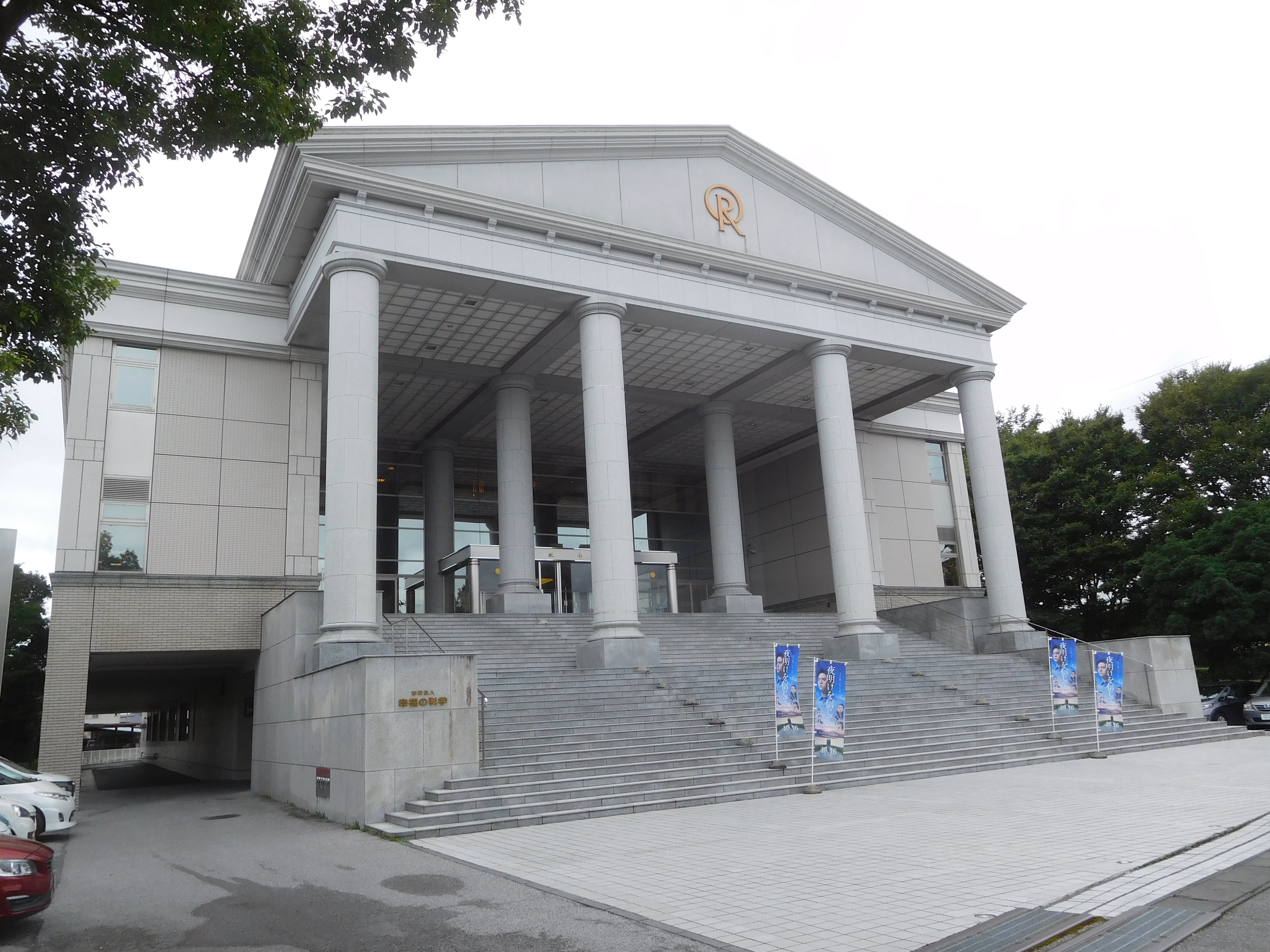
Sohonzan Shoshinkan

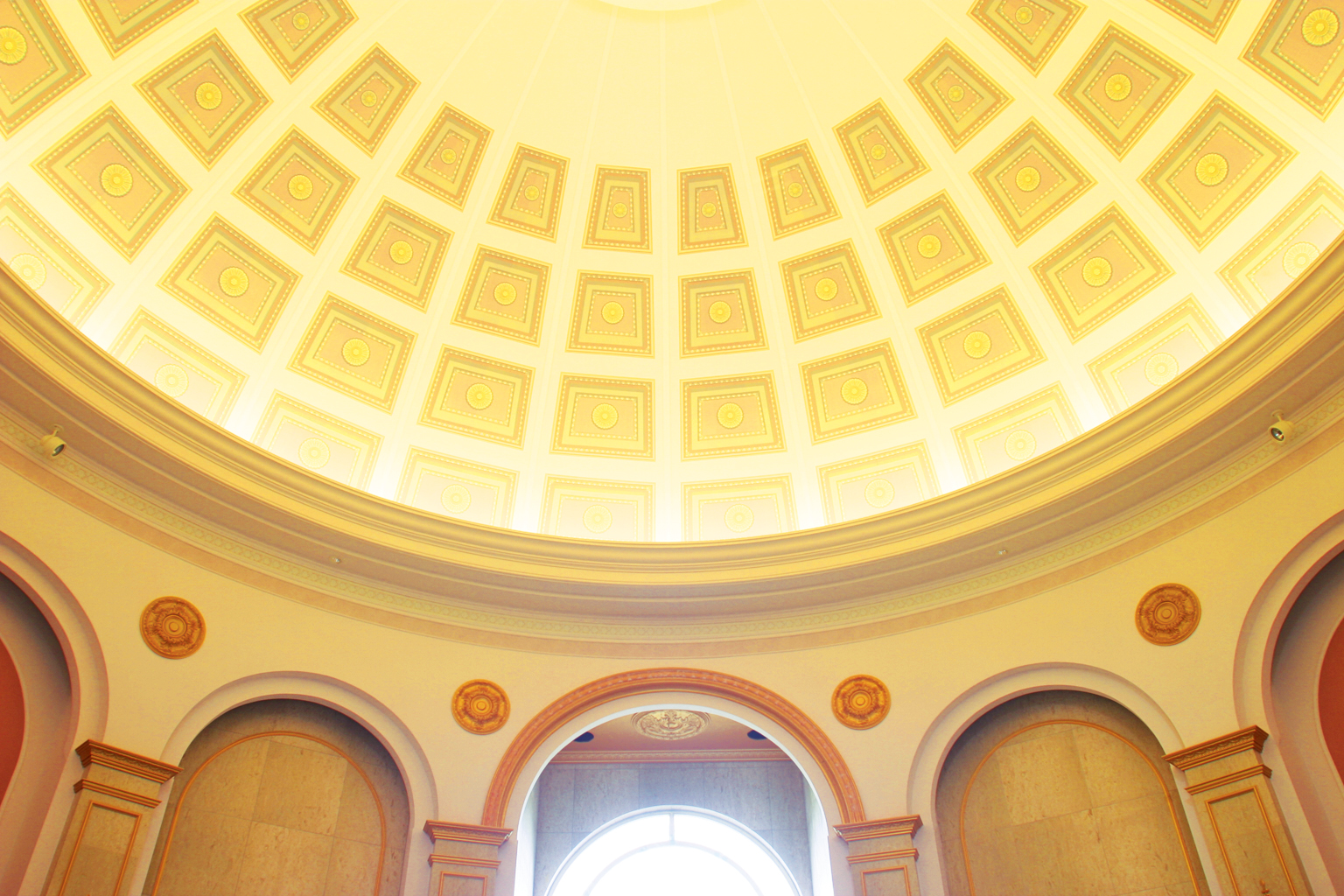
Chiba Shoshinkan ceiling

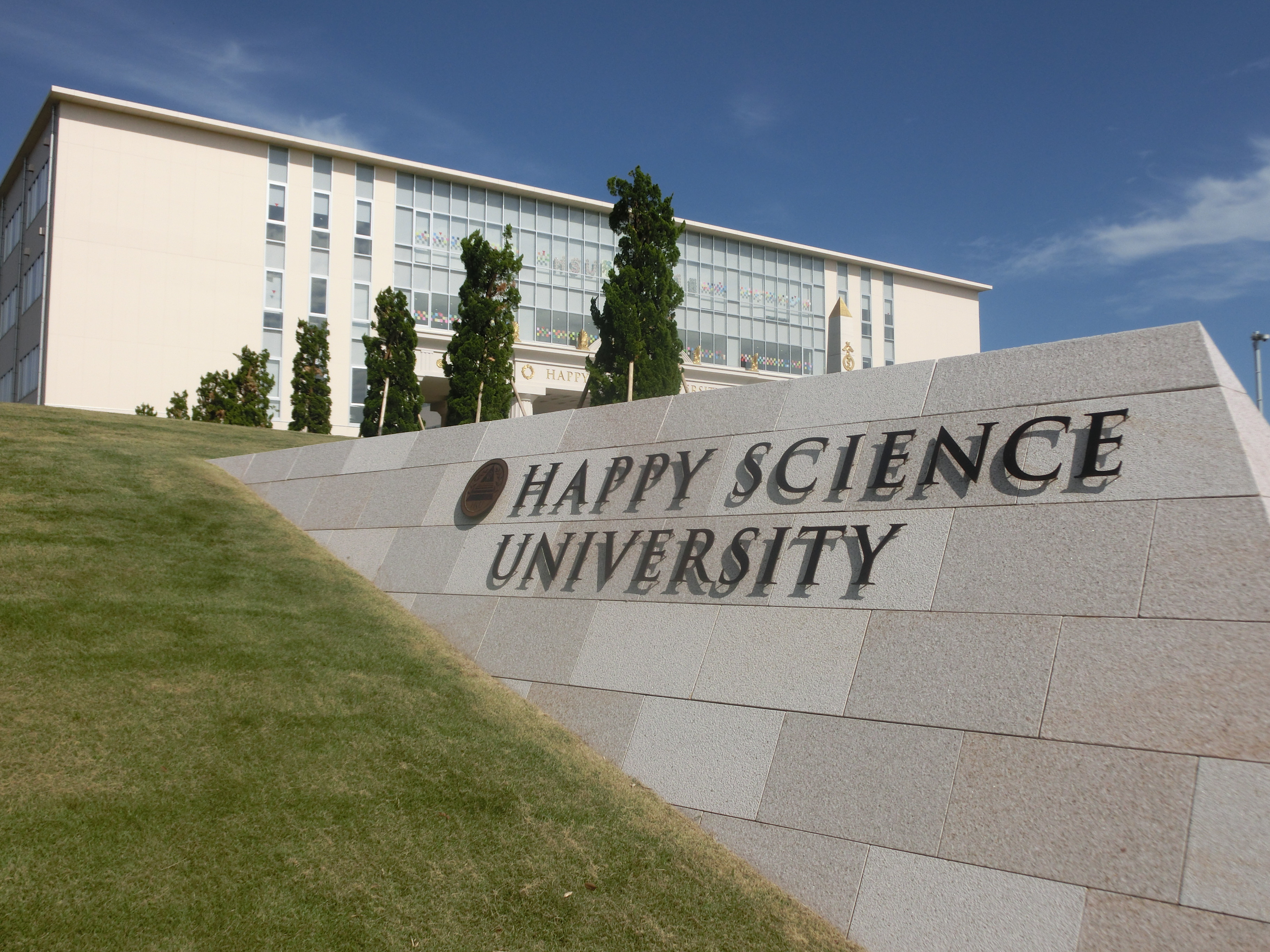
Happy Science University

== Controversy ==
Happy Science is widely regarded as a cult (Note: Multiple sources:) and one of many controversial Japanese new religions (shinshūkyō). Through the 1990s the group had a bitter rivalry with Aum Shinrikyo, culminating in a failed assassination attempt on leader Ryuho Okawa using the nerve agent VX injected into the air conditioning system of Okawa's car. It was one of many VX attacks by Aum members leading up to the 1995 Tokyo subway sarin attack, which killed 14 and injured more than 5,000 people.

Happy Science has also released promotional videos claiming, without evidence, that North Korea and the People's Republic of China are plotting the nuclear destruction of Japan. The group has sold "spiritual vaccines", falsely claiming that they prevent and cure COVID-19, advertised virus-related blessings at rates from US$100 to over US$400, and sold coronavirus-themed DVDs and CDs of Okawa lecturing, which make false claims of supposedly boosting immunity, as of April 2020. After initially defying physical distancing measures, it later closed its New York temple, announcing that it had administered their fraudulent vaccines remotely.

In February 2017, actress Fumika Shimizu abruptly retired from her former entertainment production agency amidst multiple filming projects for a full-time role in Happy Science, declaring she had been a member of the group since childhood, under the influence of her parents, both of whom were longtime believers in Happy Science.

Okawa's son and potential successor, Hiroshi Okawa, left the movement and is now one of its outspoken critics. In an article in The New York Times, he commented, "I believe what my father does is complete nonsense". His father has denounced Hiroshi as "demonic" and possessed by devils and the group has sued him for defamation. In a 2022 interview with The World, Hiroshi described Happy Science as a "cult". Regarding Ryuho Okawa's spiritual channeling sessions, Hiroshi said "It's just a performance". Hiroshi also estimated the number of Happy Science members to be around 13,000. It should be noted, however, that Hiroshi has lost several defamation lawsuits filed by Happy Science and related organizations.

== In popular culture ==
On February 10, 2022, the fifth chapter of anthology manga "Kami-sama" no Iru Ie de Sodachimashita ~Shūkyō 2-Sei na Watashi-tachi~ ('A Home Life With God ~We Children Born Into Religion~'), written by Mariko Kikuchi as a criticism of Happy Science and other fringe religious organizations, was removed by the publisher, Shueisha, following backlash from Happy Science. The other chapters were removed on March 17, 2022. It was later reported by the Weekly Flash magazine in April.

Happy Science has produced several theatrical animated movies, often made by mainstream anime studios, live action films and documentaries promoting their beliefs. These include:

- Anime:
  - 1991: Shiawasette Naani (short film)
  - 1997: Hermes: Winds of Love
  - 2000: The Laws of the Sun
  - 2003: The Golden Laws
  - 2006: The Laws of Eternity
  - 2009: The Rebirth of Buddha
  - 2012: The Mystical Laws
  - 2015–2021: The Laws of the Universe (Three part film series)
  - 2025: Dragon Heart: Adventures Beyond This World
- Live action:
  - 1994: Revelations of Nostradamus
  - 2012: The Final Judgement
  - 2016: Tenshi ni I'm Fine
  - 2017: Kimi no manazashi
  - 2018: Saraba seishun, saredo seishun
  - 2019: Immortal Hero
  - 2019–2021: Kokoro ni yorisou (three part documentary)
  - 2019: The Last White Witch
  - 2020: The Real Exorcist
  - 2020: Twinceborn
  - 2021: Beautiful Lure
  - 2021: Into The Dream and Horror Experiences
  - 2022: The Cherry Bushido
  - 2022: The Divine Protector: Master Salt Begins
  - 2023: Let It Be - Fear Never Ends (sequel to Into The Dream and Horror Experiences)
  - 2023: Before the Sunset
