= Shinji Takahashi (religious leader) =

Japanese religious leader

Personal life
- Born: September 21, 1927 Nagano, Japan
- Died: June 25, 1976 (aged 48) Tokyo, Japan
- Resting place: GLA Life Memorial Hall

Religious life
- Religion: GLA

Shinji Takahashi (高橋 信次; 1927–1976) was a Japanese religious leader, writer and founder of GLA, a religious organization established in Japan in 1969.

Takahashi taught that the essential nature of human beings is the soul.He further asserted that life is sustained by a transcendent divine existence that surpasses human intellect, and that individuals are born with the purpose of establishing themselves and contributing to the harmony of the world.

== Biography ==
=== Early life ===
Born in 1927 in Nagano Prefecture, Takahashi repeatedly experienced what he described as an “other self” that separated from his “physical self” at the age of ten. He spent his life pursuing the question of who this “other self” might be, and this inquiry would later become a major turning point that led him toward a religious path.

Takahashi entered the Army Cadet School and later, reportedly experiencing firsthand the harsh realities and tragedies of war. After the war, Takahashi went on to study electronics, physics, astronomy, and medicine, experiencing both the world of reality and that of the other world as he continued his efforts to elucidate the relationship of the human soul to the physical body.

=== Philosophy and Teachings ===
Takahashi later stated that he had reached the divine truth that humans have eternal life as souls that undergo transmigration in the form of an endless circle of birth, death, and rebirth. While managing a computer company, he continued to write and give lectures. His publications include Kokoro no Genten (The Origin of the Mind; 3 volumes) and Ningen Shaka (Human Buddha; 4 volumes) and he taught that humans are not only a physical existence but at essence are souls that are made to live by the grace of a Great Existence transcending human knowledge. He also taught that all humans are born to establish their self and world harmony.

While operating a computer-related business, Takahashi authored numerous books and conducted lectures across Japan. Takahashi led GLA and was involved with a network of business leaders who participated in the organization’s teachings and activities.

=== Later years ===
According to followers, Takahashi predicted his own death seven years before it occurred. He died on June 25, 1976, at the age of 48. After his death, leadership of GLA continued under his daughter, Keiko Takahashi.

== GLA ==
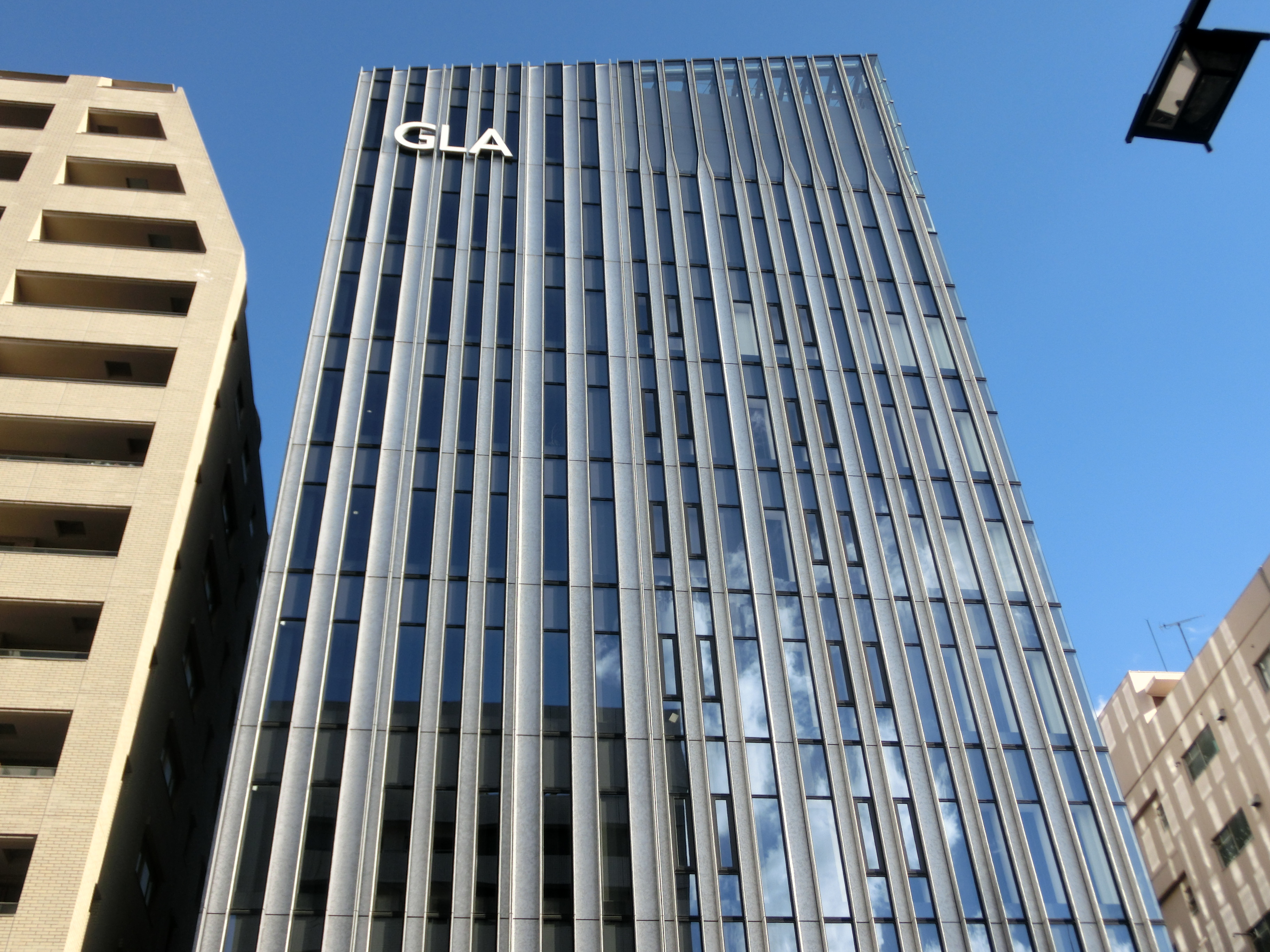
GLA General Headquarters

GLA is a religious corporation in Japan. It was founded on April 8, 1969 (Showa 44) by Shinji Takahashi and certified as a religious corporation in 1973. Keiko Takahashi has served as its leader since 1976. Its headquarters are located in Taito Ward, Tokyo. GLA is an initialism formed from the words "God Light Association."

=== Philosophy ===
The philosophy of GLA is that each member aims for “self-realization” and “world harmony,” embodying the light of God in this world. Based on a view of humanity and the world that sees humans as beings composed of “soul, mind, and body,” GLA holds the position that humans are eternal soul beings and that life has a mission and purpose. Therefore, members engage in activities aiming for spiritual growth and practical harmony through practical learning referred to as “the study of the soul.”

GLA offers generation-specific educational programs for children, youth, and middle-aged/elderly adults, as well as specialized learning opportunities in fields like business management, healthcare, and education, placing strong emphasis on practical application in daily life.

=== Doctrines ===
The doctrines shared by Shinji Takahashi and Keiko Takahashi are as follows:

1. Return to the eternal and universal divine truth (GLA's origin)
2. The great universe is the body of God, permeated by the law of circulation (Cosmology)
3. Human beings are eternal souls possessing purpose and mission (Humanism)
4. Nothing in life is meaningless (Phenomenology)
5. Fulfill life's purpose through self-exploration (Practical Doctrine)

Shinji Takahashi is said to have outlined GLA's doctrines in his work ‘Shin'gyo’. He taught that “human beings are not merely physical entities; their essence is the soul, sustained by a great existence beyond human understanding—God and Buddha,” and further that “all humans are born for the establishment of the self and the harmony of the world.” In an era dominated by materialistic economic supremacy, he approached the dignity of the heart from various angles, showing the correct way for humans to live—to live the true path.

Keiko Takahashi asserts that the root of modern society's various challenges lies in the hollowing out of human existence, stemming from the loss of the “origin of the soul” as eternal life. She states that through continuous study and practice, each individual can awaken to their true self, fulfill their soul's purpose and mission (mission work), and reclaim a more radiant life. She states that GLA's aspiration is to support members in practicing the “the study of the soul” thereby harmonizing their families, workplaces, and society, and contributing to the world.

== Practical activities as a religious leader ==
Takahashi referred to the law that he preached, and practiced, as shoubou (proper Buddhist law). It has been said that when he held lectures in the provincial regions, he would spend several hours afterwards "self-reflecting", based on the hasshoudo, as to whether there was any wrongness in his role and whether there were any inaccuracies in the "law" that he preached. It has also been said that Takahashi possessed all of the capabilities of the six spiritual powers (tengantsu, tenjitsu, tashintsu, shukumeitsu, jinsokutsu, and rojintsu.) (Note: see Takahashi's web page for elaboration on these six powers.)

Takahashi took in people such as elderly people who were homeless, a woman who had intellectual disabilities and no relatives, and people who had difficulty living independently in society, such as gangsters. He supported these people with the profits that he made as a company owner.

Takahashi criticized blind faith and fanatical belief in religion and consciousness, and paraphrasing Karl Marx, he also believed that religion based on blind faith is like opium. In his teachings he insisted that one should always doubt, and should believe only what cannot be doubted any further.

Takahashi believed that religion should not be turned into the sustenance of life, so he lived off of the profits that he earned as the corporate manager of Koden Industry Co., Ltd., without taking any profits from his religious activities. Takahashi allotted the profits he made as a corporate manager to fund missionary activities and regular administrative expenses for his religious organization.

== Principles that Takahashi preached ==
Takahashi advocated shinri (laws of nature prescribed by God, also called hou), which does not change even if the times change. Specifically, he stressed going back to the teachings of Buddha and Jesus Christ, and based on his own experiences, Takahashi preached the existence of souls and the great beyond. He stated that after death, the soul of each person goes off to a world that corresponds to that person's character (reflected through the amount of the soul's light; a greater amount of light represents a higher degree of harmony with God). Takahashi also advocated the practice of the hasshoudo (Noble Eightfold Path) that Buddha preached, as a method for harmonization on earth and for growth of each person's soul. He preached self-reflection as a means to do away with the cloudiness in one's soul (said to be created by humans' disharmonic ideas and actions) and to receive God's light, which the soul is said to originally receive. Takahashi then emphasized the practice of ideas and actions after self-reflection.

=== The essence of the universe ===
According to Takahashi, the universe that we live in is the source of banshou (all beings) and banbutsu (all things), and follows various principles, starting with the principle of samsara (cycle). The macrocosm is controlled by one large "cosmic consciousness" that harmonizes the universe. This consciousness itself is a God (the "Great God of the Macrocosm") and this universe is the body of God. The Solar System in this world is merely one of the small organs of the body of the macrocosm, and Earth is a small cell. As the Earth is a cell in the body of the universe, it possesses a consciousness. In such a way, banbutsu represents all things, and is a mass of energy. Since the macrocosm is a divine body, the Earth, as a cell in this macrocosm, is also a divine body, or a temple. All things, starting with human beings, continue repeating the process of samsara in order to make this Earth into a harmonious "Buddha land", or utopia, that follows divine will. Takahashi referred to the attainment of enlightenment based on becoming one with the macrocosm at the apogee of the rise in the degree of harmony of the soul with God as uchu sokuware (the mindset where one can understand all truths in an instant upon expanding their other self to the scale of the universe, through self-reflective meditation).

=== Past life, present life, and afterlife ===
Takahashi referred to the material world that we live in as the "phenomenal world" and the non-material world where the soul returns after death as the "actual world". He believed in evolution through the course of samsara. Growth was indicative of a rise in harmony with the gods, becoming closer to the existence of compassion and love. Based on this degree of harmony with the gods, stages of consciousness would arise in the soul of each human being. Those that are particularly harmonious are considered as the world above (fourth dimension to the ninth dimension; a larger number indicates a higher degree of harmony), whereas the most disharmonious are considered to be in hell. Thus, the living circumstances in the real world after death change depending on the degree of harmony one had achieved. Through this cycle, human beings become closer to the existence of compassion and love.

With regard to samsara, Takahashi compared the physical body to being just a boat for traveling through life, and life to a route for the soul, which is the essence of human beings. The physical body is only given by the gods and by one's parents as a virtual boat for traveling through life.

With the 3rd dimension as the origin, each dimension is referred to by name, such as the “astral world” of the fourth dimension and the “spiritual world” of the fifth dimension, but according to Takahashi, the numbers are merely appellations; in reality, these stages are considered as existing inexorably, confirmed when the third eye is open.

=== Plan of the world above ===
According to Takahashi, gods are light, they are the energy that fills the macrocosm, they are the dharma, they are unlimited will, and they are all compassion and love. In the world above, gods are also considered to be symbolized as a spiritual second sun. In relation to this, buddhas in Buddhism, and the Messiah in Judaism, Christianity, and Islam is a person that has realized "uchu soku ware”, the concept of Brahman and the self as one. Human beings are all equally the children of God, and can reach the stage of buddha by making their soul grow through numerous transmigrations. As of 1971, there were 423 people on earth (425 following death) who had become a Buddha. In addition, there are also bodhisattvas who are of the previous stage. The stage preceding that consists of shoten-zenjin. According to Takahashi, the specific method for attaining Buddhahood is to actually incorporate the “hasshoudou” that was preached by Gotama Buddha, the founder of Buddhism, as well as self-reflection based on this hasshoudou into daily life (a method that Takahashi called “gyou soku hikari”). By practicing this, human beings can increase their degree of harmony with gods and Buddha, and as a result, attain “uchu sokuware”.

What Takahashi said regarding this point was that based on this, as humans are all originally children of God, "everybody is a brother", and warring is a result of complete ignorance and misunderstanding. In addition, at one point, all people are promoting the growth of their soul while repeating samsara, so their object is actually harmony on earth. The orientation of such a framework is determined in the world above, and based on this, people are only born after designing, in Takahashi's "actual world", what will be their life and mission on earth.

However, the mission of each person is not specific, it is only to train the soul while living like a human being. “Training the soul” refers only to harmonizing one's own consciousness, harmonizing with others nearby, doing work that is suitable to harmonization, and based on this, stabilizing one's own economy, to create a peaceful environment. In such a way, it is not that Takahashi glorified particular religious austerities, but rather, he harshly criticized disharmonious austerities that would oppress everyday life, such as compulsive praying. In particular, he believed that no one should sell their soul to religious leaders who claim to be the only doorway to salvation. That would make the people dependent on the leader. If one wants to be saved, they should instead distance themselves from such organizations, self-reflect on aspects that are unharmonious to them in everyday life, and translate this into action. In doing so, by brushing away the cloudiness of one's soul one can receive the light of gods, and as an actual phenomenon, one is guided towards harmonization. “Tariki” (strength through others) constantly exists as compassion of God, but as it is not permitted for tariki to change one's consciousness, unless ones tries to receive the light of gods through their own will, this light will be closed off due to the “cloudiness” of their own soul. As a result, a person's own awareness and deeds based on this awareness are the top priorities.

=== The journey towards harmonization ===
==== Hasshoudou (The Noble Eightfold Path) ====
Using the “hasshoudou” (seeing, hearing, and speaking of things properly) that Gotama Buddha taught, as a pivot, Takahashi preached that each person self-reflects, and returns the ideal being of their soul to a state that meets the laws of nature. Also, to seek the inner cause of one's own disharmonious notions and actions, becoming aware of the causal relationship between how one's notions and actions created discord in their surroundings and whether one was inflicting harm to themselves, repenting so that this kind of result does not occur again. Ideally, to reach a state where they can reasonably put the results of their repentance into practice. It is said that at this time, the person that is self-reflecting becomes aware of “self-reflecting” solely for the purpose of harmonization with the community. Takahashi warned of becoming attached to “self-reflection” itself and becoming careless in everyday life as a result. He perceived that it is important for the action of self-reflection itself to follow "the middle road".

Our existence that is naturally driven by the laws of nature, is the body of God (the macrocosm), and human beings, who are all individual consciousnesses that were generated within the consciousness of God as the mother body, are considered as microcosms in relation, both are beings that possess consciousness, and are considered as being connected through the soul (defined by Takahashi as the central part of consciousness). It is considered that in this universe, according to Takahashi, they are not only laws that are physical, but they are also applied to the internal aspects of human beings as well (for example, laws of action and counteraction for notions and actions, laws of circulation that can be applied to physical and spiritual aspects as well as karma, which is said to be the inertia of the soul), and it is in this universe that the opportunity for the generation of all joys and sorrows lies.

Takashi referred to the laws of nature as “hou” (law), “shoubou” (proper Buddhist law), and “shinri” (divine principle), and stated that by following these laws, it becomes possible for the soul to receive the light of gods (considered as being the natural state of souls) and achieve harmony and peace, but if these laws are opposed (this freedom is considered as being permitted to human beings), one's soul creates “cloudiness,” obstructing the light of gods, and resulting in the generation of anguish (development of a phenomenon where virtue is generated by thinking of virtue, and wrongness is generated by thinking of wrongness; the so-called “divine justice.” One must lie on the bed one has made. This “divine justice,” according to Takahashi, is the principle of the universe). Therefore, the macrocosm that was considered as being created by God and is driven by the laws themselves teach the proper way of how to live, and learning Dharma for the laws of nature and living according to the Dharma is considered a method that yields harmony within each person as well as the outside world, which is a reflection of the inside of each person. The state that suits this law is the middle road, and the method to reach this middle road is the hasshoudou that Gotama Buddha had preached (however, it is not only Buddhism that is “shinri,” but rather all Buddhism, Christianity, Judaism, and Islam for which “shinri” has been conveyed from the world above to the earth, and for which there is considered to be one core element to the teachings, the “hou”); by executing this Hasshoudou every day and every minute in “what they think” and “what they do,” human beings can break away from the vicious cycle of bitterness and sadness that was created as a cause of one's disharmonious notions and actions, and they can also take the first step to enlightenment, based on this kind of steady everyday practice.

Takahashi referred to the sections of the Eightfold Path as Shouken (Right View), Shoushi (Right Intention), Shougo (Right Speech), Shougyou (Right Work), Shoumyou (Right Livelihood), Shoujin (Right Effort), Shounen (Right Mindfulness), and Shoujyou (Right Concentration).

For Takahashi, meditation for self-reflection consisted of lightly closing the eyelids, with the eyes facing straight forward behind the eyelids; when one becomes sleepy, he/she is to open their eyelids lightly, and direct their focus on a spot slightly in front of where they are sitting. As for the way of sitting, Takahashi deemed that sitting cross-legged is acceptable, so that the mind does not become distracted by the body. However, if one meditates to clear their mind of unnecessary thoughts without self-reflecting and while their mind is distorted, or if one acquires such a habit, evil spirits that relate to the distorted mind are drawn in, resulting in grave danger, such as one's mentality becoming seized as well as experiencing physical disorders. Takahashi believed that in continuing this kind of self-reflective meditation one starts interacting with the guardian spirit/guiding spirit, and dialogue becomes possible. Then, one reaches a level of nyoshin (a state where one is able to understand their heart to some extent, and where one has the ability to read other people's hearts).

In addition, regarding current suffering, Takahashi believed that the cause of suffering is always a result of seeds being scattered somewhere, and that as a method for eliminating this cause and relieving oneself from their sufferings, one should recall all of their doings from the day they were born until the present day temporally, according to when they were 0 to 5 years old, 5 to 10 years old, 10 to 20 years old, 20 to 30 years old, etc. They should self-reflect on their thoughts and actions in their relations with other people by comparing them with the standards of each of the 8 views and concepts described above. If one finds that there were thoughts and actions that go against “righteousness,” they must determine the cause of such thoughts and actions, apologize to God, and make amends. Takahashi deemed that the “righteousness” of the hasshoudou is the righteousness according to the perspective of a well-intentioned third person.

Jealousy, animosity, or blame that develops in one's mind represents self-preservation, and is rooted in a phenomenon that occurs when one's desires are not fulfilled this can also occur if the disharmonious words and actions of another person create a distortion in one's heart. When the cloudiness is eliminated from one's heart through self-reflection, something gushes up from inside, which turns into tears and washes off dirt and dust. As one's heart transforms from one that is cloudy to one that is clear, God's light penetrates into the heart and the penetration of God's light also means that one acquires the strengths of other powers as well. Takahashi believed that when people try hard to realize a lifestyle that is based on right judgments made by the heart where there are no biases, their self-righteous heart disappears, and in turn they learn that everyone in the human race are brothers and sisters, and acquire the power of great charity and love. According to Takahashi, charity refers to actions like that of the sun where one provides the energy of heat and light fairly to both good and bad people. Harmony among the human race is said to be established when a sense of appreciation of being able to live grows, and this mindset is expressed as a shape through the action of gratitude, bodhisattva karma, where one offers services to other people.

=== Transition of Religion and the Path to Shinri ===
==== Towards the Present Age ====
Takahashi preached that Buddhism and Christianity in the present age have become academic, or formalized, and changed into a faith based on other powers. In response to this, he advocated returning to the times of Gotama Siddhartha and Jesus Christ in many of his literary works, starting with “Ningen/Shaka” (“Human Beings/Gotama Buddha”). In addition, Takahashi emphasized that neither Jesus Christ nor Gotama Siddhartha preached the thoughts of other powers at all, and that Christianity and Buddhism in their respective times were not complicated like the Christianity and Buddhism of today. With regard to the thoughts of other powers influencing these religions, these laws of nature (the pure religious base of Buddhism, Islam, and Christianity) transformed as a result of the intentions of those who were in power over time, as well as the interpretations of the many scholars; the cores of these laws of nature were lost, various theories became mixed, and they became academized in a complex manner and lost their substance. In addition, these laws of nature were intentionally distorted and conveyed to people for the purpose of individual's own benefit, and people were made to believe that those who obstructed this would be met with strict counteractions. This new set of distorted laws were slowly deemed as being the laws of nature as taught in today's versions of those religions.

==== Soul (consciousness) ====
===== Origin of consciousness =====
In the universe, the generation of materials is characterized by a greater consciousness (God) of the universe as the starting point, followed by a segmentation as gravity, magnetism, electricity, light, and heat. Based on their mutual interactions, the concentration of energy, energy that has been corporealized, is reconverted into energy together with time after undergoing the process of dispersion, and based on the concentration and dispersion of this energy, the 2 phases of energy circulate eternally. Similarly, for consciousness, there is a greater consciousness (God) of the universe as a starting point, after which, individual beings are born in the actual world (the great beyond), and then they show their form in the phenomenal world (earth). The consciousness that has been born once develops while circulating between the great beyond (energy) and this world (material), with parents serving as the border (it is thought that characteristics as an individual persist; tathagatas are considered as persisting even after death, even while feeling a sense of unity with God).

===== Dimensional structure of consciousness =====
- Mentality, according to the definition by Takahashi, refers to an encompassment of the energy of God (or the energies of gods and Buddha), manas, and the soul. The consciousness of human beings is structured so that the energy of God is the central point, and manas and soul, in this order, form concentric spheres around it.
- "Energy of God" — The innermost and deepest part of consciousness. This energy is God Himself, energy itself, and compassion and love themselves. The energy of God lies within all human beings, creates the manas, and forms the soul of each person. The fact that the energy of God is inherent in human beings is the key attribute for being a human being; in the souls of human beings, the ability to differentiate and to recognize all phenomena, and to sense the unity between the macrocosm and oneself (“uchu soku ware”) is thought to be derived from the undulation of this energy of God that flows from the manas.
- “Manas” – Center of consciousness — The place and vessel through which the energy of God is received. The place of the body of light itself where compassion and love are intertwined. Manas is the base point for connecting to God, and is also considered as being a bond with God. In the self-reflection talked about by Takahashi, the part of humans that makes inquiries to the heart and listens to the heart is this manas (even if it is possible to lie to other people, the reason why it is not possible to lie to oneself at all is due to this manas that is connected to the gods and Buddha. In the great beyond, people judge themselves, not based on transcendental existence, but rather based on their own manas that cannot lie. According to Takahashi, gods are not found in shrines, temples, and churches, nor in maala or icons that have been created, but rather inside the manas of each individual person. Faith is considered as belief in this manas where one cannot lie to oneself). Takahashi believed that people can communicate with the gods through this manas.
- “Soul” – Overall consciousness — With manas at the center, the 9th-dimensional world of the universe, the 8th-dimensional world of tathagatas, the 7th-dimensional world of bodhisattvas, the 6th-dimensional world of gods, the 5th-dimensional world of spirits (the worlds up to here represent 90% of the subconscious), the 4th-dimensional astral world (zone of ideas), and the 3rd-dimensional phenomenal world (10% surface consciousness) form concentric spheres in this order (the 90% that is not part of the 10% surface consciousness is referred to as the subconscious). According to Takahashi, these eightfold concentric spheres, as a whole, are referred to as the soul. Takahashi used “consciousness” and “spirit” synonymously, or in part when referring to the 10% surface consciousness.

“90% subconscious” – Latent layer of the soul — the part that is equivalent to the manas, the 9th through 5th dimensions of the soul. According to Takahashi, this layer represents the worlds that are connected to manas, and is the limitless reservoir, and space full of creation, freedom, prajna, compassion, and love. It is also the Maha Prajna Paramita or "reservoir of intrinsic prajna". The dimensions of the world within correspond to the dimensions of the external world. It is said that human beings possess exquisite undulations, more so the closer they are to the manas.

“Zone of ideas” – the layer between the subconscious and surface consciousness, it serves as the window between the two. It is the part that is equivalent to the 4th dimension. The zone of ideas itself is a part of consciousness, and consists of energy. It is considered as being the portion where the undulations of both the subconscious and surface consciousness, as mediated through the five organs of sense, mix together. According to Shinji, “sounen” (ideas) refer to the activities of the energy in which this subconscious and surface consciousness are mixed together. The activity ratio of the inside (subconscious) and outside (surface consciousness) that partitions the body of ideas is usually about 2:8 or 1:9. Consequently, the zone of ideas, which is the part where both of these consciousnesses are mixed together, is considered as the part where the impact of surface consciousness is extremely large (easily biased by the five organs of sense, or easily influenced by the environment). The amending surface consciousness (which means there are no instances of bias by the senses nor instances where one forges ahead filled with desires, without self-reflecting) and purification of the zone of ideas (eliminating the cloudiness of the soul by amending thoughts and actions) were thought of as representing an opportunity for making the actions of the subconscious (zenga) work on the zone of ideas and surface consciousness (referring to the light of the guardian/guiding spirits and light of the inside reaching the surface). However, the layer of the subconscious that acts strongly, or in other words, the dimension to which one’s consciousness is connected to, appears as the character of that person, and it is thought that there are authoritative stages to this. There are individual differences in whether this action is expressed as “reidou” which is a psychic power that is suited to the laws of nature.

As the method for doing so, the Noble Eightfold Path and self-reflection are suggested. In addition, it is considered that the lifestyles of each person in their past life, as well as in the great beyond and in the phenomenal world, are recorded in this zone of ideas. In this, all thoughts and actions in one’s life are recorded in detail with extreme exquisiteness, in the form of colors that correspond to the person’s thoughts and actions (particularly compassionate acts or thoughts are recorded in gold letters). However, when starting afresh and making compensations through self-reflecting from the heart, records that reflect disharmonious thoughts and actions that deviated form the middle road, (which are recorded in red letters), are left over as records of ideas and behaviors, but the fact that self-reflection was carried out is described next to the disharmonious portion. Incidentally, it is thought that when one leads a life of the middle road, entries are made in black characters. The function of the soul depends on the compassion of gods and Buddha. The tones of this zone of ideas determine the world that one goes to after death. For this reason alone, Takahashi placed importance on self-reflection and actions that achieve harmony after self-reflection.

“10% surface consciousness” – Open layer of the soul: the so-called open consciousness. World of the five organs of sense — the eyes, ears, nose, tongue, and the skin — and the will that serves as the base point for judgments through these five organs, the place for daily life and actions. The cause of the suffering of human beings lies entirely six roots of perception (the five organs of sense, plus consciousness), and suffering is thought of as occurring due to these six roots being constrained by the actions of surface consciousness (symbols such as status, honor, appearance).

There is also a “body of light” that shrouds the soul and functions as a body in the actual world. In human beings who possess a physical body, the body of light and the atomic corporality (body of the physical world/phenomenal world; a concept originated by Takahashi) are linked together and integrated by a “pipe (reishi-sen)” that can be expanded and contracted without limit, where the exchange of information is being conducted magnetically and reciprocally (during sleep, the soul, which separates from the physical body, receives the energy of mentality in the actual world. However, the reishi-sen (life line between God and all living things) remains connected); the brain is solely an arithmetical unit, and the center of memory is thought to lie in the body of light. When this reishi-sen breaks and the body of light and the atomic corporality have completely separated, death (in other words, the return of the soul to the actual world/the great beyond) is signified.

=== The principle body of the soul and 5 alter egos ===
According to Takahashi, the soul of a human being is formed from the principle body of 1 person and the alter egos of 5 people. As the composition for this, there are 4 series, as shown below.

1. 1 male principle body, 5 male alter egos
2. 1 female principle body, 5 female alter egos
3. 1 male principle body, 2 male alter egos, 3 female alter egos
4. 1 female principle body, 2 female alter egos, 3 male alter egos

The principle body and alter egos are thought of as possessing the same kinds of characteristics with regard to assets and drawbacks in terms of personality. The principle body has the role of resolving even the karma that each alter ego creates, in addition to the karma that is created by oneself (it is acceptable for alter egos to resolve their own karma). Takahashi referred to this as the “brothers of the soul”. When 1 person out of 6 appears on earth, 1 person from among the remaining 5 serves as the guardian spirit (there may also be cases where this role is played by a physical ancestor). Aside from the “brothers of the soul,” for the specialized occupation that an earthly human being holds, the spirit that provides guidance from the actual world is referred to as the guiding spirit. Spirits that are suited for each of the specialized fields of the earthly beings serve as guiding spirits; for example, a spirit specialized in physics would guide a person specializing in physics, and a spirit specialized in law would guide a person specializing in law.
