= Ryuho Okawa =

Happy Science religion founder (1956–2023)

- 大川 隆法
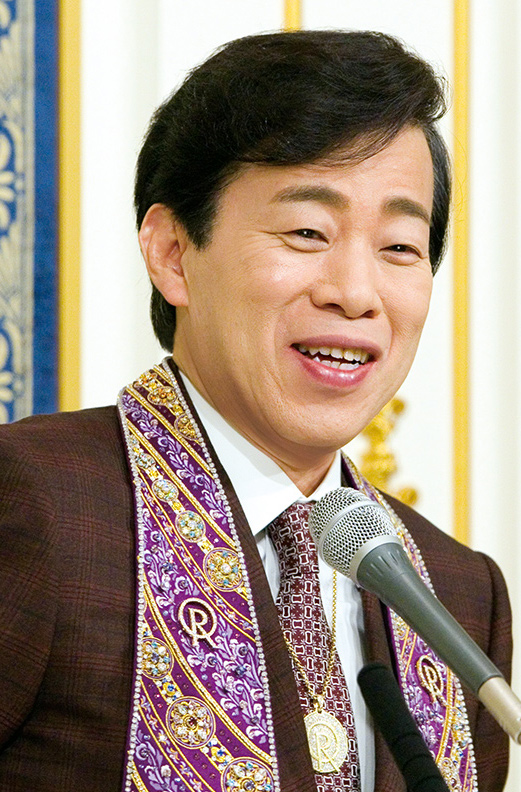
- Okawa in 2015

President of the Happiness Realization Party
- In office 27 December 2012 – 2 March 2023
- Preceded by: Position established
- Succeeded by: Vacant
- In office 22 July 2009 – 12 September 2009
- Preceded by: Position established
- Succeeded by: Vacant

President of Happy Science
- In office 19 November 1996 – 2 March 2023
- Preceded by: Position established

Chairman of Happy Science
- In office 6 October 1986 – 19 November 1996
- Preceded by: Position established

Personal details
- Born: Takashi Nakagawa (中川 隆); 7 July 1956 Kawashima, Tokushima, Japan
- Died: 2 March 2023 (aged 66) Tokyo, Japan
- Citizenship: Japanese
- Spouses: Kyoko Kimura (木村 恭子, Kimura Kyōko) (m. 1988; div. 2012) Shio Kondo (近藤 紫央, Kondō Shio) (m. 2012)
- Children: 5, including Hiroshi Okawa (大川 宏洋, Ōkawa Hiroshi)
- Relatives: Shizuko Nakagawa (中川 静子, Nakagawa Shizuko)
- Education: Tokyo University; City University of New York
- Occupation: Religious leader Political activist
- Website: https://ryuho-okawa.org/

Ryuho Okawa (Note: This is an adopted name, and is now known as Okawa's holy name. The name is derived from replacing the character 中 (middle, naka) in Okawa's birth family name 中川 with 大 (great, ō), and from adding 法 (dharma, hō) to the on'yomi of his birth given name 隆. The name was adopted with the founding of Happy Science in 1986.) (大川 隆法; Ōkawa Ryūhō; born Takashi Nakagawa (中川 隆; Nakagawa Takashi), 7 July 1956 – 2 March 2023) was a Japanese religious and political leader who was the CEO and founder of the Happy Science and the Happiness Realization Party. He was also an author and chairman of two companies affiliated with the organization, New Star Production and ARI Production.

His organization has been widely criticised as a cult. Adherents of the religion worship Okawa, who claimed to be the current incarnation of a god called "El Cantare" and a number of other beings, including Hermes and Gautama Buddha.

== Early life ==
Ryuho Okawa was born Takashi Nakagawa on 7 July 1956 in Kawashima (now Yoshinogawa), Tokushima Prefecture as the second son of Tadayoshi Nakagawa (中川 忠義, Nakagawa Tadayoshi) (1921–2003) (later known by his pen name Saburō Yoshikawa (善川 三朗, Yoshikawa Saburō)) and Kimiko Nakagawa (中川 君子, Nakagawa Kimiko). His older brother is named Tsutomu Nakagawa (中川 力, Nakagawa Tsutomu) (born 1952) (later known as Makoto Tomiyama (富山 誠, Tomiyama Makoto)).

Okawa said his family was religious; both of his parents believed in God and the Buddha, and Okawa believed in the existence of spirits and souls, and a world after death in childhood. Despite his beliefs, Okawa was not active in religious practice. Okawa and Tomiyama were raised in a strict home environment that was ordinary and not particularly rich nor poor.

Yoshikawa is said to be one of the most important influences on Okawa's life. Okawa said, despite not having a spiritual or religious master, Yoshikawa had an important influence. Yoshikawa edited journals for the Japanese Communist Party and later worked as an agricultural advisor in local government. He was deeply interested in spirituality and religion. He studied in the Christian Church as a teenager, as well as in a new religion called Seicho-no-Ie after World War II. He later became a follower of Shinji Takahashi, leader of the religious organization God Light Association (GLA). He would also later serve as Happy Science's official adviser in its first few years. (Note: Yoshikawa was known as "Honorable Adviser" (名誉顧問, Meiyo Komon). In January 2003, a memorial shrine for him opened.) Yoshikawa was demanding on Okawa's success. Yoshikawa gave him and Tomiyama hour-long lectures after dinner at home. The lectures included religious topics like the Bible and The Gateless Barrier, as well as secular topics like Kantian philosophy and Marxism during elementary school, although Okawa was not successful in school.

Okawa wanted to be a scholar or a diplomat. He wanted to spread his ideas in academia, or broaden his view on life by experiencing different cultures as a diplomat. Because of this prospect, he started studying until late at night and became amongst the top of his class. He became particularly good at English. He was obese, weighing 60 kg when he was 143 cm tall.

During secondary school, Okawa was an active student. He fished, played tennis, and practiced kendo. He was involved in school activities; he was president of the student union and editor of the school newspaper.

== Career ==
=== Education ===
In 1975, Okawa failed the entrance exam for Tokyo University. After studying for a year, he was accepted into the university's Liberal Arts Division. During his first year, he was not socially adjusted. He said he once wrote love letters to a girl, but was rejected. He felt uncomfortable amongst the students who were uninterested in spirituality. During his second year, a time he calls "the first stage in the 'awakening of wisdom'", he modeled his daily schedule after that of Immanuel Kant, whom he respected deeply. At 3 pm, he would take a walk while writing poetry. At 5 pm, he would go to the local bathhouse and stay there for an hour thinking about his day. Going home, he would have a cheap meal, and buy two books at a local bookstore. From 8:30 to 9 pm, he would read, then drink tea, and then read philosophy. The philosophy he read included those of Plato and Kitaro Nishida.

In April 1978, after his second year at university, he majored in politics and studied at the Faculty of Law. After his third year, he paused his studies for a year. At the end of the break, he failed a judicial exam and the exam for higher-level civil servants. In his fourth and last year, his interests started to change from philosophy to metaphysics. He read the works of Shinji Takahashi of GLA and Masaharu Taniguchi of Seicho-no-Ie. He accepted a job offer from TOMEN Corporation (now Toyota Tsusho), a major Japanese trading company, because his grades were not sufficient for graduate school. After graduating in spring 1981, he took up his job. He was assigned to the foreign exchange department at the headquarters in Tokyo.

=== Spiritual contacts ===
Okawa claims to have been contacted with a divine spirit. His official story as described in later books is as follows. On 23 March 1981, before graduating from university and working at TOMEN Corporation, Okawa experienced a "Buddha Enlightenment", a contact with a divine spirit. He claims this spirit was that of Nikkō Shōnin, who was one of Nichiren's disciples. On that day, he had a sudden feeling that a person was trying to communicate with him. He grabbed a pencil and a card. His hand started to move on its own, and wrote "良い知らせ、良い知らせ" (good news, good news). Asking who the person is, his hand signed "日興", the name of Nikkō. A week later, the spirit of Nichiren himself started contacting Okawa. They then communicated every day from March to July 1981, when he was still working at TOMEN. Okawa asked the spirit what mission he should pursue in life. The spirit replied "Love others, nurture others, and forgive others". This message later became the basis of Okawa's teachings about love.

In June 1981, the religious leader Shinji Takahashi's spirit told Okawa his destiny to found a new religion. His father Yoshikawa, upon hearing of this, went to Tokyo, later becoming one of his followers. The next month, the spirits spoke through Okawa, including those of Kūkai, Shinran, Confucius, Jesus Christ, Moses, and Nostradamus. Yoshikawa and Tomiyama taped the communications. (Note: The identity of Okawa's father and older brother were hidden; they were initially described as Okawa's friends under the names Yoshikawa Saburō (善川 三朗, Yoshikawa Saburō) and Tomiyama Makoto (富山 誠, Tomiyama Makoto) respectively. Their true identities were revealed through investigation by Japanese sources in 1991.) The tapes were interviews between the interviewing Yoshikawa and the spirits. Okawa acted as a spiritual medium and answered Yoshikawa's questions. The tapes were transcribed and adapted into publishable formats by Yoshikawa. Yoshikawa's help allowed Okawa to continue working as a businessman at TOMEN Corporation. Without his help, Happy Science could possibly have started differently and at a later date, or even not have been founded at all. The spiritual messages were given to the publisher Chōbunsha (ja:潮文社) because they specialized in spiritual works.

Okawa published a vast number of spiritual messages from various spirits in order to prove the existence of the Spirit World to the public. His first thirteen books, published from 1985 to 1987, consisted of these spiritual messages; the first eight were published from 1985 to 1986 under Yoshikawa's pen name to avoid Okawa's authorship being found out by his employers. The first book, The Spiritual Messages of Nichiren (日蓮の霊言, Nichiren no reigen), (Note: Originally Nichiren Shōnin no reigen (日蓮聖人の霊言, Nichiren Shōnin-no-reigen)) was published on 15 August 1985. The last two spiritual messages were published in early 1991: The Great Warning of Allah (アラーの大警, Arā no dai-keikoku) (January 1991) and The Terrifying Revelations of Nostradamus (ノストラダムス戦慄の啓示, Nosutoradamusu senritsu no keiji) (February 1991). Both became best-sellers in Japan in 1991. After 1991, almost all spiritual message books were discontinued aside from the messages of Buddha.

The books of spiritual messages were replaced with newer versions when Okawa started publishing under his own name after the foundation of Happy Science. The new books were akin to collected and revised versions of the originals. They are presented as religious tractates which are divided into chapters, rather than interviews between Yoshikawa and the spirits.

Okawa told his readers to not let foreigners read the spiritual messages and not translate the messages into English, Chinese, or Korean. He says that foreigners should not know about the messages "until the time is ripe" and that propagating them overseas would "only heighten the fear." Astley (1995) says the real reason Okawa discouraged readers from spreading the messages abroad may be because the messages seem to contain a large amount of plagiarism.

Okawa not only claimed to be a reincarnation of Gautama Buddha but also the incarnation of a "Highest Spiritual Being" named “El Cantare”. Okawa claimed El Cantare was one of ten Highest Spiritual Beings. According to Okawa, this was revealed to him by the consciousness of Gautama Buddha himself. This revelation convinced him that his mission was to spread truth on earth. (Note: According to Happy Science's doctrine, a person has six souls. Each one is alternately reincarnated throughout time. Each soul's experience can be shared with the other five. For example, Gautama Buddha, Hermes, and Okawa are believed to be three different incarnations of the same person. Because of this, both Hermes and Gautama, who are past incarnations of Okawa, have different personalities and can individually talk to Okawa. Thus the Buddha can communicate with his reincarnation Okawa.)

=== Business career ===
Okawa's life as a businessman went normally despite his alleged communication with the spirits, which he later claimed continued throughout his business career. In August 1982, Okawa was sent to the company's US headquarters at the World Trade Center in New York City for training. He took an English course at Berlitz Language School, and studied international finance at the City University of New York. (Note: Astley (1995) says Okawa studied at New York University.) He dropped out of university after experiencing an intensified inferiority complex from seeing a Taiwanese classmate speaking fluent English. Around this time, he said he experienced the "second stage in the 'awakening of wisdom'". In 1983, he returned to Tokyo, and was assigned to work on negotiations with banks. In March 1984, he was sent to Nagoya. He claimed that by the summer of 1985, he had read over four thousand books, which he claimed made him superior to everyone else.

Okawa claimed he got a reputation in his company for talking about spirits and calling people possessed. In June 1986, he left his business career. He attributed this to be on the advice of high spirits telling him to start a his own religion. On 15 July, he resigned from TOMEN Corporation and on October 6, founded Happy Science and adopted the name "Ryuho Okawa".

=== Happy Science ===
==== Study group ====
On 6 October 1986, Okawa opened the first office for Happy Science in Suginami, Tokyo, with four staff members. Happy Science's initial name was Jinsei no Daigaku-in: Kofuku-no-Kagaku (人生の大学院 幸福の科学) ("Happy Science, The Postgraduate School of Human Life"). The name "幸福の科学" originates from inspiration that Okawa said he received from Nichiren's spirit; the details were published in Okawa's first book Nichiren no reigen in 1985. At first, the organization disguised itself as a "study group on human happiness" and consisted of readers and sympathizers of Okawa's spiritual works, who were friends and acquaintances of Okawa. However, the organization may have intended to be known as a religious body later.

On 23 November 1986, Okawa gave his first sermon to about 80 followers in Tokyo. This date is now known as one of the most important dates in Happy Science's history. It is known as the day of Shoten-bōrin (初転法輪, Shoten-bōrin) ("The First Turn of the Wheel of the Dharma"). (Note: The name refers to the day that the "Wheel of Law" (hōrin (法輪, hōrin)) started to "turn for the first time" (shoten (初転, shoten)). It is a Buddhist expression, where the "Law" refers to teachings, in this case those of Okawa. The "turn" refers to the introduction of the teachings to the world.)

In March 1987, Okawa gave what is known as his first official large public lecture, entitled "The Principles of Happiness", to an audience of about 400 people. In the lecture, he implied that he was a prophet, saying that while spiritual mediums and psychics cannot hear the voice of God, prophets can. (Note: Okawa may have thought of God as "High Divine Spirits" as well as the Creator God. Fukui (2004) says this is so because Okawa mentions Archangel Gabriel, who sent messages to Prophet Mohammed, and the spirit of Nichiren who spoke to him, both of which are known as high divine spirits.) He said that a prophet's task is to listen to the voice and spread the word of God. He stated that the early years of Happy Science would consist of study.

In June 1987, a new series of books, called the "law" (法, hō) series, launched. The first three books, The Laws of the Sun (太陽の法, Taiyō no hō), The Golden Laws (黄金の法, Ōgon no hō), and The Laws of Eternity (永遠の法, Eien no hō), published from June to October, may be seen as the fundamental doctrinal text of Happy Science. The three books are collectively called "The Trilogy of Salvation" (救世の三部作, Kyūsei no Sambu-saku). They were originally presented as the final revelations of the Buddha. The Laws of the Sun is the first book in which Okawa explained his own point of view and his teachings. While Okawa had published books before, they were all spiritual messages that came from spirits, not Okawa. The book contains "the core of [Happy Science]'s doctrine" and is "the starting point of its salvation movement". The book also contains an account of Okawa's early life. The Golden Laws is dedicated to "time and history in relation to the Truth". The Laws of Eternity focuses on the structure of the spirit world, which The Laws of Sun also covers, but the book explains it in greater detail. Each book in the trilogy has a subtitle which mentions the shaka. The subtitles would be changed in future editions following changes in Happy Science's doctrine.

At the end of 1989, with the publication of The Rebirth of the Buddha, (Note: Originally Buddha Saitan (仏陀再誕, Budda saitan)) Okawa officially claimed that he was an incarnation of Buddha and his is teachings were re-interpreted in light of this revelation. The doctrine of Happy Science was interpreted to be fundamentally Buddhist, according to his own followers.

Okawa's audience at his lectures grew larger as Happy Science gained new members. The initial audience of 400 at his lecture in 1987 grew to 10,000 by 1990. The organization grew rapidly. In December 1989, the headquarters was moved to one of the most expensive business buildings in Tokyo in Kioichō, Chiyoda, next to Tokyo's main business and political area. The rent was known to be ¥25 million per month.

==== Religious organization ====
On 7 March 1991, Happy Science obtained legal status as a "religious juridical person" (宗教法人, shūkyō-hōjin) through the Religious Corporations Law by the Tokyo Metropolitan Government. As a result, its name was simplified to Kofuku-no-Kagaku (幸福の科学, Kōfuku-no-Kagaku). (Note: An alternative name Shūkyō Hōjin Kofuku no Kagaku (宗教法人 幸福の科学, Shūkyō Hōjin Kōfuku no Kagaku) ("Religious Corporation – Kofuku-no-Kagaku") was also used.) The group's government recognition allowed it to gradually grow by taking on new members from the general Japanese public. In that year, Happy Science started large-scale festivities. One of these was Okawa's "Birthday Festival" (御生誕祭, Goseitan-sai), held on 15 July 1991, just after Okawa's 35th birthday. In the festival, Okawa was in front of an audience of 50,000 people, which included the mass media, in Tokyo Dome. He declared that he now had at least 1.5 million followers and that his real identity is "El Cantare", the Grand Spirit of the Terrestrial Spirit Group, also known as the "Buddha of Mahayana". El Cantare was revealed to have several reincarnations prior to the Buddha and Okawa.

In May 1994, a doctrinal shift occurred. Old publications were revised to reflect the new concept of El Cantare. This included an updated version of the Trilogy of Salvation, which was called the "new" (新, shin) series. Each book in the trilogy had its subtitle revised, which now refers explicitly to El Cantare's name rather than the shaka as with the original versions. The revised version of The Laws of the Sun contains a different account of Okawa's early life compared to the original version. It is unclear which, if either of these contradictory accounts is the most truthful. The new edition also contains a list of El Cantare's claimed previous reincarnations.

Since the founding of Happy Science, Okawa has reportedly published over 500 books, most of which are transcripts of his video recorded lectures. There are 15 films based on his teachings: The Laws of the Sun, The Laws of Eternity, The Golden Laws, The Terrifying Revelations of Nostradamus, Hermes - Winds of Love, The Rebirth of Buddha, The Mystical Laws, The Final Judgement, The Laws of the Universe, I'm Fine My Angel, The World We Live In, and Daybreak.

==== Organization ====
Fukui (2004) notes that Okawa's leadership is consistent with sociologist Max Weber's theory about charismatic authority. Okawa's leadership comes from belief in his supernatural traits, as he identifies as the Buddha and El Cantare. Under his authority, Happy Science has undergone rapid changes, including changes in its projects, doctrine, and staff, who do not remain in the same post for a long time. Fukui (2004) says, citing Wallis (1983), that rapid change allows a charismatic leader to stay in power. Rapid change protects the leader from vulnerability stemming from disbelief in their supernatural claims, routinization, or dissenting leaders.

Since its founding, Happy Science has been organized like a secular company. This is reflected in titles of positions, which are secular. Okawa's original title was "Coordinator" or "Chairman" (主宰, Shusai), with followers referring to Okawa as "Master Coordinator" (主宰先生, Shusai Sensei). In January 1997, with the inception of the "New Hope Project", Okawa's title was changed to "President" (総裁, Sōsai) and Okawa is called "Master President" (総裁先生, Sōsai Sensei) by members. Under Okawa, a Board of Directors, which manages Happy Science, and the Heads of Divisions exist. Branch offices (支部, shibu) exist in and outside of Japan, with each office run by a branch manager (支部長, shibu-chō). Fukui (2004) says, when visiting the headquarters' offices in Tokyo, it was difficult to "tell the difference between [Happy Science]'s offices and those of a business corporation." Most staff members were wearing business suits and doing paperwork at their desks. The usual office equipment are seen as well, such as telephones, fax machines, filing cabinets, photocopiers, and computers. Fukui (2004) says "apart from the presence of the gohonzon (the religious icon of worship) within the office of each division, it felt as though I was visiting a major trading house." Although the employees are shukke-sha (出家者, shukke-sha) (i.e. "renouncers who have left their secular lives"), they spent a considerable amount of time working in the office.

Happy Science has been widely criticised as a cult.

==== Role as Buddha and El Cantare ====
In Happy Science, Okawa is known as the Buddha, both the Enlightened One and the reincarnation of Gautama Buddha, and the embodiment of El Cantare, the Grand Spirit of the Terrestrial Spirit Group, called "Lord El Cantare" within Happy Science. The name "El Cantare" means "beautiful land of light, Earth". El Cantare is also known as the "Eternal Buddha". This Buddha is related to the Creator God, known as the "Primordial Buddha". Many members believe Okawa is an incarnation of the Creator. Okawa is believed to have many past incarnations. These include a king named La Mu on the continent Mu, a king named Thoth on the continent Atlantis, a king named Rient Arl Croud in the Inca Empire located in ancient South America, Ophealis and Hermes in ancient Greece, and the Buddha in India.

As El Cantare, Okawa is the main figure of worship in Happy Science. Members have faith in El Cantare. Their worship gives them "comfort, energy, courage, hope, steadiness, and a sense of being guided and looked after." The organization's object of worship (御本尊, gohonzon) has a photo of Okawa as El Cantare. El Cantare is said to have chosen to be incarnated in Japan because both Eastern and Western civilizations are merged there. When the two civilizations coexist harmoniously, an element of the Utopia would be realized. Thus Japan is the ideal place for Okawa to run a utopian movement which will bring about a new age in the 21st century. Okawa said El Cantare has two roles: a Savior, like Amitabha Buddha, and Mahavairocana, the Buddha's essence which represents enlightenment.

El Cantare is believed to be needed in this world because the world is in a crisis. Dark thoughts exist in the world, which cause disasters, including wars and other conflicts. In Happy Science's doctrine, like attracts like; the cultivation of the Light of Buddha attracts more light, and the cultivation of dark thoughts attracts more dark thoughts. Dark thoughts currently outweigh the Light in the world, creating the need for a Utopia which reverses the situation. This Utopia is to be realized by El Cantare and his followers.

Because Okawa identifies as both the Buddha and El Cantare, Fukui (2004) believes that he fits both types of prophet which sociologist Max Weber believes exist: the exemplary type who leads people to salvation through exemplary living and the emissary type who declares their demands to the world. Okawa plays the exemplary role as the Buddha by embodying the correct way of living and by guiding people to enlightenment. Okawa fulfills the emissary role as El Cantare by providing "hopes of salvation."

==== Publications ====
A vast amount of literature has been dedicated to Happy Science's doctrine. Okawa said they all have the purpose of learning Happy Science's fundamental scripture, "The Dharma of the Right Mind" (正心法語, Shōshin Hōgo). Okawa's publications come in three different types. One are the books containing spiritual messages from Okawa's communication with various spirits. The second type are transcriptions of Okawa's lectures and seminar-talks. The third are Okawa's writings. Other authors have contributed as well. Okawa's wife, Kyoko, published books, mainly for the female audience. Some high-ranked disciples have produced titles. Others are published under the name of Happy Science or its Public Relations Department, which include books, magazines, comics, and textbooks.

Okawa was a prolific writer. By the early 1990s, he published about 20 to 30 books per year. He is said to have published over 300 books by 2004.

Many of Okawa's publications became best-sellers. This may have been influenced by a practice of adherents purchasing copies and giving them out for free to attempt to convert new members. A practice of placing new copies of Okawa's publications in street libraries has also been reported. (Note: His 1991 books The Great Warning of Allah and The Terrifying Revelations of Nostradamus became best-sellers in that same year. His 1999 books The Laws of Prosperity (繁栄の法, Han-ei no hō) and The Syndrome of the Unhappy (幸福になれない症候群, Kōfuku-ni-Narenai Shōkō-gun) reached fourth and twelfth respectively in that year's best-seller list. The release of the film The Laws of the Sun in 2000, based on the book with the same name, caused the book version to become a best-seller that same year. In 2001, The Laws of Miracles (奇蹟の法, Kiseki no Hō) and The Origin of Love (愛の原点, Ai no Genten) became the top ten best-sellers. In 2002, The Laws of Triumph (常勝の法, Jōshō no Hō) was also a top ten best-seller.) Some of Okawa's books sold over a million copies. Okawa's main book The Laws of the Sun has "sold" the most copies, with ten million reported sold by January 2000. Happy Science said that by 1997, over 50 million copies of its titles were reported sold worldwide.

Unlike traditional religious text, Okawa's writings are simple and written in casual language, like a generic self-help book. This simplicity may have helped make the books easier to sell.

==== Rivalry with Aum Shinrikyo ====
Happy Science came into a bitter rivalry with the cult Aum Shinrikyo dating back to 1990, when Happy Science criticized the cult and its leader Shoko Asahara. Okawa called Asahara a frog, referring to Asahara's aquatic yogic acts. In response, Asahara criticized Okawa for not having undergone ascetic training and having a lack of doctrinal knowledge. In 1991, when Happy Science was going through heavy criticism from the public, academic Hiromi Shimada, a critic of Happy Science, appeared to favor Aum Shinrikyo over Happy Science. Shimada favored Asahara because he went through ascetic training and had familiar knowledge of the doctrine of Buddhism. Okawa was criticized for having little knowledge of his own teachings and having faked his spiritual messages. He was challenged to prove his supernatural powers. Asahara published a book mocking Okawa's superficial knowledge of Buddhism. After the book's publication, Happy Science and Aum Shinrikyo were invited to a live television debate, but Okawa declined to participate. The hostility between the two groups culminated in an assassination attempt on Okawa by Aum Shinrikyo in February 1995. Aum members attempted to kill Okawa by putting the nerve agent VX in the air conditioning system of his car. The perpetrators did this by injecting the agent into the car's ventilation system with a needle-less syringe. The attempt failed for unknown reasons.

=== Happiness Realization Party ===
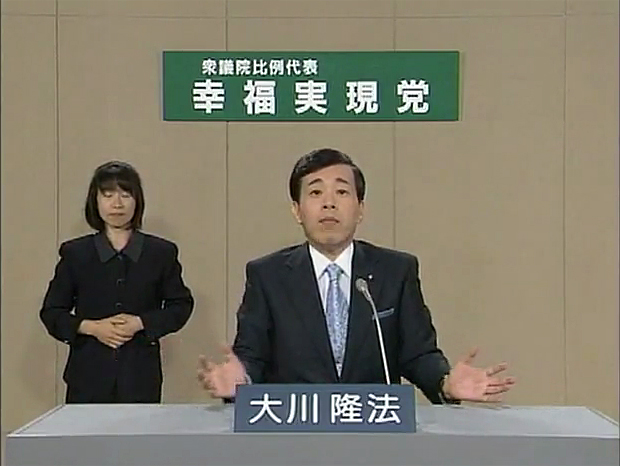
Okawa delivering a policy speech during the 2009 Japanese general election, August 2009

In September 2008, Okawa lectured at the New York branch of Happy Science, in which he talked about the political soft power of Happy Science:

Happy Science is the most powerful and famous religion in Japan. I needed only 20 years to accomplish this. I was first asked for advice by Prime Minister Nakasone in 1988. Then we had Prime Minister Miyazawa who was a member of Happy Science, and after that, we produced a lot of Prime Ministers and Ministers. So I became one of the most influential kingmakers of Japan. The Japanese Prime Minister, Mr. Aso, visited Happy Science recently ... I gave him a strategy to become Japan's Prime Minister. He learned a lot and became the Prime Minister and came to New York to give a speech at the Assembly of the United Nations. It was based on just what I told him. So I am one of the kingmakers of Japan. I can choose a Japanese Prime Minister and I can have a Prime Minister quit in a month. It's a hidden secret of Japan ... Happy Science is the most influential power in Japan. So, if the American President cannot realize some diplomatic policy, he can just ask me and I can realize it in a week or so. It's a hidden secret. In Japan, religion has more power than politics.

A few months later, Okawa announced the founding of the Happiness Realization Party (HRP), the political wing of Happy Science. In April 2009, Okawa presented the party's Declaration (幸福実現党宣言, Kōfuku Jitsugentō sengen). On 23 May 2009, the party was formally founded with Jikidō Aeba as party leader. The party was founded in anticipation of the 2009 Japanese general election on 30 August 2009. The party is religious, conservative, and populist. The party does not make direct reference to the religious ideas of Happy Science.

Okawa's wife Kyoko became party leader on 4 June 2009. On 22 July, Okawa was appointed as president of the party. In that year's general election, the party fielded 337 candidates, including 75 women, in 288 out of the 300 constituencies in Japan. This number of candidates was rivalled only by the two major parties at the time, the Democratic Party of Japan and the Liberal Democratic Party. However, the party did not win any seats. It claimed to have just over one million votes, which is 1.4% of all votes cast, despite Happy Science having about ten million members. (Note: This discrepancy may be because many, if not most Happy Science members, are only loosely connected to the party.) The party also unsuccessfully ran for the 2009 Sendai mayoral election. Kyoko stepped down as party leader and became head of the party's publicity department on 29 July before resigning from the party on 15 August. Okawa resigned as president on 12 September and a turnover of top party officials occurred.

In May 2010, the party gained its first seat in the House of Councillors when Yasuhiro Oe left the Democratic Party of Japan and joined HRP. On 21 April, Okawa was appointed honorary president of the party. A House of Councillors election was held in July, where no HRP candidates won. In December, Oe left HRP.

On 27 December 2012, Okawa was reappointed as president of the party.

== Personal life ==
On 10 April 1988, Okawa married Kyoko Okawa (大川 きょう子, Ōkawa Kyōko), née Kyoko Kimura (木村 恭子, Kimura Kyōko), born on 22 August 1965. Kyoko had played a role as a spiritual leader alongside Okawa since 1988. Kyoko is a graduate of the University of Tokyo, where she studied English literature. Of his marriage with Kyoko, Okawa said it provided his life "with a stable basis that enabled me to concentrate even more on my task", and that it was "instrumental in the development of [Happy Science]". Kyoko became the Presidential Assistant of Happy Science in 1988, and the Head of Happy Science's women's group, called the "Society of Aphrodite" (Aphrodite-kai (アフロディーテ会, Afurodiite-kai)). Like her husband, Kyoko has also published books for Happy Science, which mainly targeted the female audience. She also wrote an essay for each issue of Happy Science's monthly journal Happy Science Monthly (月刊 幸福の科学, Gekkan Kōfuku-no-Kagaku), which started in April 1987; she would address topics ranging from education to the family. Her essays were compiled into books. She was the joint president of the Happiness Realization party along with Okawa and later became the leader of the party. Okawa said that he and Kyoko were together in some of their past lives. (Note: Okawa said that Kyoko lived in Atlantis, the Inca Empires and Ancient Greece in her past lives. Kyoko was the mythological figure Aphrodite in Greece, who was saved from captivity by Hermes, an incarnation of Okawa. Okawa said, in contrast to the original story, they married and had a son named Eros. Kyoko's other incarnations included Manjushri in India and Florence Nightingale in England, who is believed to be the most recent of Kyoko's previous incarnations.) The Society of Aphrodite and one of its subdivisions, "The Society of Florence" (フローレンスの会, Furōrensu-no-Kai), are named after the Greek goddess and Florence Nightingale respectively because they are believed to be previous incarnations of Kyoko.

In February 2011, it was reported that Okawa and Kyoko were preparing for divorce. Happy Science announced that she had been permanently expelled for allegedly causing great personal and administrative damage to the organization, libeling the organization in various newspapers, and besmirching the name of Lord El Cantare.

Okawa and Kyoko had five children: eldest son Hiroshi (宏洋, Hiroshi) (born 24 February 1989), eldest daughter Sayaka (咲也加, Sayaka) (born 16 February 1991), second son Masaki (真輝, Masaki) (born 12 May 1993), third son Yuta (裕太, Yūta) (born 21 September 1995), and second daughter Arisa (愛理沙, Arisa) (born 26 September 1997).

Hiroshi worked for Happy Science after graduating from university. However, he stopped working there because he felt he was not competent enough for the job. He then worked at a construction company for three years before returning to Happy Science in December 2015. Since January 2016, he was president of Happy Science's entertainment agency. He was involved in film production and music, working as an actor and a singer. He was intended to be Okawa's successor as leader of Happy Science. On 1 October 2018, he declared that he broke up with Happy Science on his personal YouTube channel. In an interview with Shūkan Bunshun on 28 February 2019, he said the reason is because at the end of January 2017, he felt pressured by his father to marry the actress Fumika Shimizu, who became a member of Happy Science in February. On 18 November, when he refused the marriage, his father became furious, and after that day, Hiroshi left Happy Science. Happy Science has denied the accusation of Okawa pressuring Hiroshi to marry Fumika, saying that it was Hiroshi himself who was interested in marrying her. He has since renounced his father, stating "I believe what my father does is complete nonsense." He said that from an early age, he was taught that his father is a god. However, Hiroshi said he never thought of Okawa as a god and that he never wanted to follow in his father's footsteps nor has he ever wanted to do religious work.

Sayaka is said to be the managing director and general manager of Happy Science. On 1 September 2015, she married Naoki Okawa (大川 直樹, Ōkawa Naoki), né Naoki Ishihara (石原直樹, Ishihara Naoki), a member of the board of Happy Science. Happy Science has said that Sayaka would be heir to the organization's leadership instead of Hiroshi. Masaki has been said to work for Happy Science since he was a student at university. He is serving as managing director and secretary general of science at Happy Science. On 7 July 2016, he married Mizuho Okawa (大川 瑞保, Ōkawa Mizuho), née Mizuho Sato (佐藤 瑞保, Satō Mizuho), who serves as the chief of the president's office at Happy Science. Yuta works as director of Happy Science, general manager of the governor's office and staff officer for the promotion of the headquarters' government affairs. He has also published books for Happy Science.

On 19 December 2012, Okawa married Shio Okawa (大川 紫央, Ōkawa Shio), née Shio Kondo (近藤 紫央, Kondō Shio), born on 22 September 1985. She is believed by members of Happy Science to be the incarnation of the goddess Gaia.

Okawa had an aunt named Shizuko Nakagawa (中川 静子, Nakagawa Shizuko) (1919–1994). She was a novelist. In 2012, Okawa delivered a Happy Science sermon about her in which Shizuko's spirit was speaking through Okawa.

=== Death ===
On 28 February 2023, Okawa was hospitalized after fainting at his home in Minato, Tokyo. He died on 2 March, at the age of 66.

== Controversy ==
Okawa has expressed anti-Korean sentiment, although he denied this. He has also expressed beliefs that are widely associated with historical revisionism in Japan, including that Koreans had never been forced to labor by Japan, and that comfort women (euphemism for forced prostitutes) were also never forced to work. To this end, Okawa stated that:

Those Koreans who presented sob stories decades later were plucked from weepy funerals and "bribed" to blacken Japan's name, such lies now being firmly "embedded in Korean culture".

== See also ==
- List of messiah claimants
- Messiah complex

== Sources ==
- Akiko, Yamashito (1998). The "Eschatology" of Japanese New and New New Religions From Tenri-kyō to Kōfuku no Kagaku. Archived from the original on 10 July 2022.
- Astley, Trevor (1995). "The Transformation of a Recent Japanese New Religion: Ōkawa Ryūhō and Kōfuku no Kagaku". Japanese Journal of Religious Studies. 22 (3–4). doi:10.18874/jjrs.22.3-4.1995.343-380.
- Baffelli, Erica (2007). "Mass Media and Religion in Japan: Mediating the Leader's Image". Westminster Papers in Communication and Culture. 4 (1): 83. doi:10.16997/wpcc.75.
- Dessì, Ugo (2013). Japanese Religions and Globalization. Routledge. ISBN 9780415811705.
- Encyclopedia of New Religious Movements. Taylor & Francis. March 2004. ISBN 9781134499700.
- Fukui, Masaki (2004). A Study of a Japanese New Religion with Special Reference to its Ideas of the Millennium: The case of Kofuku-no-Kagaku, The Institute for Research in Human Happiness (PDF). Archived from the original (PDF) on 13 August 2022.
- Hotaka, Tsukada (2012). "Cultural Nationalism in Japanese Neo-New Religions: A Comparative Study of Mahikari and Kōfuku no Kagaku". Monumenta Nipponica. 67 (1): 133–157. doi:10.1353/mni.2012.0015. S2CID 144601480.
- Leto, Mario (20 March 2014). "Happy Science and Religious Attraction: Written Discourse Analysis of Evangelistic Material" (PDF). 論叢: 現代語・現代文化. 12. Archived from the original (PDF) on 23 August 2022.
- Shields, James Mark (2009). "The Pursuit of Tangible Happiness Religion and Politics in a Japanese 'New, New Religion'" (PDF). Kultura I Polityka. Archived from the original (PDF) on 23 August 2022.
- Tsukada, Hotaka (25 February 2010). "「幸福実現党」 とは何だったのか" (PDF). 「ラーク便り」 研究ノート (in Japanese) (45). Religious Information Research Center. Archived from the original (PDF) on 23 August 2022.
- Winter, Franz (2013). "A "Greek God" in a Japanese New Religion: On Hermes in Kōfuku-no-Kagaku". Numen. 60 (4): 420–446. doi:10.1163/15685276-12341275.
- Yoshikawa, Saburō (1985). 日蓮聖人の霊言―今、一切の宗派を超えて (in Japanese). 潮文社. ISBN 978-4806311454.
